= Brad Keselowski =

American racing driver (born 1984)

- Keselowski at Las Vegas Motor Speedway in 2026
- Born: Bradley Aaron Keselowski; February 12, 1984 (age 42); Rochester Hills, Michigan, U.S.
- Height: 6 ft 0 in (1.83 m)
- Weight: 177 lb (80 kg)
- Achievements: 2012 NASCAR Sprint Cup Series champion 2010 NASCAR Nationwide Series champion 2018 Advance Auto Parts Clash winner 2018 Bojangles' Southern 500 winner 2018 Brickyard 400 winner 2020 Coca-Cola 600 winner 2022 Bluegreen Vacations Duel winner
- Awards: 2008, 2009, 2010 NASCAR Nationwide Series Most Popular Driver; Named one of NASCAR's 75 Greatest Drivers (2023)

NASCAR Cup Series career
- 629 races run over 19 years
- 2026 position: 19th
- Best finish: 1st (2012)
- First race: 2008 Dickies 500 (Texas)
- Last race: 2026 Season Finale 400 (Homestead)
- First win: 2009 Aaron's 499 (Talladega)
- Last win: 2024 Goodyear 400 (Darlington)
Wins	Top tens	Poles
36	282	18

NASCAR O'Reilly Auto Parts Series career
- 257 races run over 15 years
- 2020 position: 76th
- Best finish: 1st (2010)
- First race: 2006 Ameriquest 300 (California)
- Last race: 2020 LS Tractor 200 (Phoenix)
- First win: 2008 Federated Auto Parts 300 (Nashville)
- Last win: 2018 Sports Clips Haircuts VFW 200 (Darlington)
Wins	Top tens	Poles
39	174	22

NASCAR FedEx Freight Truck Series career
- 66 races run over 11 years
- 2015 position: 90th
- Best finish: 21st (2005)
- First race: 2004 Kroger 250 (Martinsville)
- Last race: 2015 Pocono Mountains 150 (Pocono)
- First win: 2014 UNOH 200 (Bristol)
Wins	Top tens	Poles
1	15	1

ARCA Menards Series career
- 3 races run over 2 years
- Best finish: 121st (2004, 2006)
- First race: 2004 The Channel 5 205 (Kentucky)
- Last race: 2006 Hantz Group 300 (Michigan)
Wins	Top tens	Poles
0	0	0
- Statistics up to date as of November 8, 2026.

Bradley Aaron Keselowski (/kɛzˈlaʊski/; born February 12, 1984) is an American professional stock car racing driver, team owner, and entrepreneur. He last competed full-time in the NASCAR Cup Series, driving the No. 6 Ford Mustang Dark Horse for RFK Racing, a team he also co-owned. He was the owner of Brad Keselowski Racing, which fielded two full-time trucks in the NASCAR Camping World Truck Series for 10 years.

Keselowski, who began his NASCAR career in 2004, is the second of only six drivers to win a championship in both the Cup Series (2012) and the O'Reilly Series (2010) and the twenty-fifth driver to win a race in each of NASCAR's three national series. When he won the Cup Series championship in 2012, he joined Dale Earnhardt and Jeff Gordon as the only drivers to win the title within their first three full seasons of competition.

Keselowski is the owner and founder of Keselowski Advanced Manufacturing, a hybrid manufacturing company based in Statesville, North Carolina, specializing in additive metal technologies as well as CNC machining. He left RFK Racing as both driver and owner at the end of 2026.

== Early life and career ==
Keselowski was born in Rochester Hills, Michigan, and grew up in a racing family. He is the fifth and youngest child of Kay and Bob Keselowski and the nephew of Ron Keselowski. His older brother, Brian, is also an active racing driver. The Keselowski family is of Polish descent. Keselowski spent much of his adolescence working at his father's race shop; he swept and mopped the floors, and mowed the grass. In 2000, Keselowski began racing stock cars in the Factory Stock division.

== NASCAR ==
=== 2004–2006: Early years ===
In 2004, at only twenty years old, Keselowski began his NASCAR career as the driver of the No. 29 Ford F-150 for the generally owned company in the Craftsman Truck Series. He made his debut in the Kroger 250 at Martinsville, where he started twenty-sixth and finished thirty-third. He made seven more starts that season, with his best finish coming in the UAW/GM Ohio 250 at Mansfield, where he finished sixteenth.

Keselowski started competing in the Truck Series full-time in 2005 with backing from SUBcrews.com and Samson Stone. He opened the season with a seventh-place finish in the Florida Dodge Dealers 250 at Daytona, his only top-ten finish of the year. He would end up finishing twenty-first in points. He ran the first two races of 2006 for K-Automotive before a lack of sponsorship caused the team to temporarily suspend operations. Keselowski then drove the No. 02 Chevrolet at Kentucky and Memphis, filling in for an injured Kelly Sutton and drove the No. 63 Ford for MB Motorsports at Bristol and in the season finale, the Ford 200 at Homestead.

=== 2007–2009: Breakout years ===
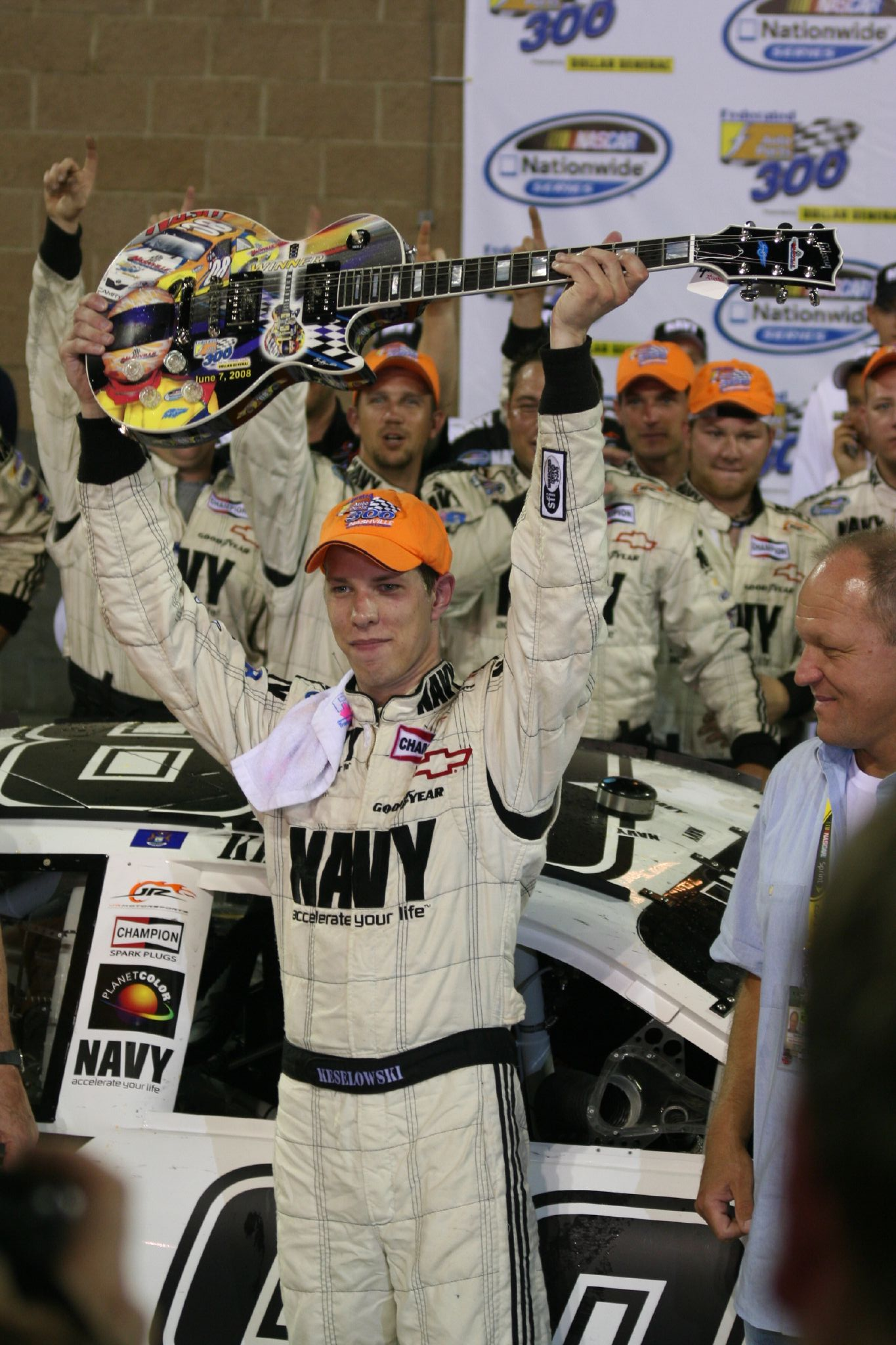
Keselowski in victory lane following his first career Nationwide Series victory at Nashville Superspeedway

Keselowski began competing in the Busch Series full-time in 2007. He drove the No. 23 Chevrolet Monte Carlo SS for Keith Coleman Racing until the team suspended operations that July. Earlier in June, during the 2007 Truck Series season, Keselowski was tabbed by Germain Racing to replace Ted Musgrave in the No. 9 Team ASE Toyota Tundra for the O'Reilly 200 at Memphis after Musgrave was suspended for an in-race scuffle with Kelly Bires at the Milwaukee Mile. Keselowski won his first career pole for the race, and led sixty-two laps, but got turned around by Travis Kvapil as they fought for the lead with ten laps to go. Keselowski wound up finishing sixteenth. Shortly afterward, Keselowski was called by car owner Dale Earnhardt Jr. to drive the No. 88 United States Navy-sponsored Chevrolet for JR Motorsports for three races, and eventually the rest of the Busch Series season. During the Camping World 300 at California Speedway, Keselowski was involved in a violent accident involving A. J. Allmendinger and J. J. Yeley. His car crashed hard into the Turn 1 wall and went airborne. It later caught flame, but Keselowski was able to climb out of his damaged car, though he complained of foot pain. He would later be treated and released from Loma Linda University Medical Center and was cleared to race at Richmond the following weekend. Keselowski would close the 2007 season with five top-ten finishes and a twenty-fifth-place finish in points.

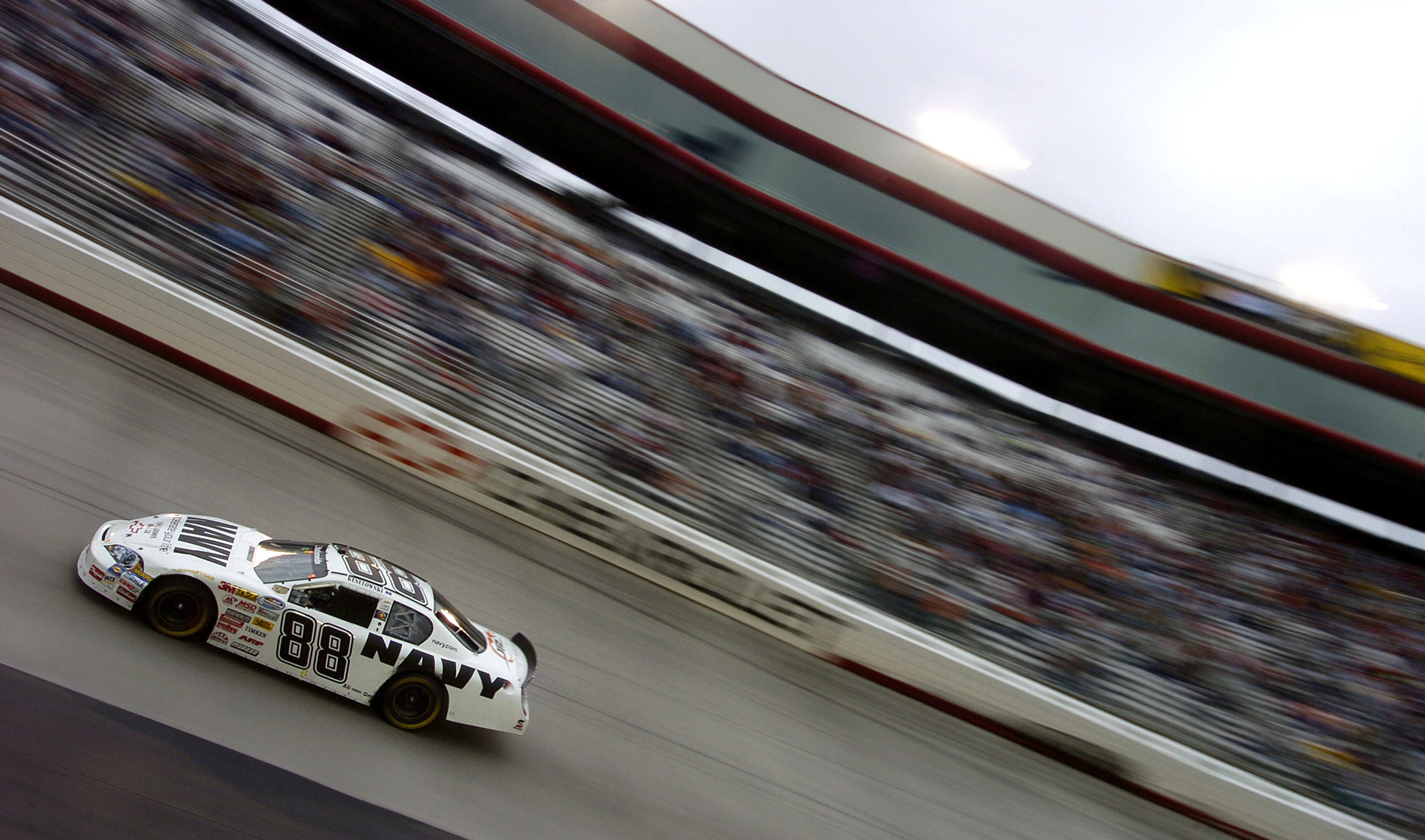
Keselowski at Bristol Motor Speedway in 2008.

In 2008, Keselowski re-signed with JR Motorsports for the 2008 Nationwide Series season, and earned his first career victory in the Federated Auto Parts 300 at Nashville Superspeedway, holding off Clint Bowyer. Keselowski would hold off Bowyer again for his second career win in the Food City 250 at Bristol Motor Speedway. He ended the season third in points, the highest finish by a full-time Nationwide Series-only driver. Keselowski also got his first taste of Sprint Cup action during the 2008 season. He was on standby for an ill Jeff Gordon at Kansas and for expectant father Casey Mears at Talladega, before competing in two races for Hendrick Motorsports in the No. 25 GoDaddy.com Chevrolet Impala. Keselowski finished 19th in his Cup debut, the Dickies 500 at Texas, and 23rd in the Ford 400 at Homestead.

Keselowski returned to JR Motorsports to drive the No. 88 Chevrolet for the 2009 Nationwide Series, with sponsorship from GoDaddy.com, and competed in a limited Cup schedule. He drove the No. 25 GoDaddy.com Chevrolet for Hendrick Motorsports in seven races and drove the No. 09 Miccosukee-sponsored Chevrolet for Phoenix Racing in five races.

==== First career Sprint Cup victory at Talladega ====
Keselowski pulled off a massive upset and earned his first career Sprint Cup victory in the Aaron's 499 at Talladega. He pushed Carl Edwards towards the front from fifth with two laps to go. Coming out of turn four on the final lap, he attempted to trick Edwards into blocking on the high side so that he could pull underneath. Edwards moved high to block, opening the door for Keselowski to attempt a pass on the low side. When he saw Keselowski moving low, Edwards again tried to block him. Their cars made contact, with Edwards spinning as Keselowski charged to the checkered flag. Due to the rear-wing design on 2009 Car of Tomorrow, Edwards' car lifted off the ground as it spun backward. After Ryan Newman's No. 39 hit Edwards' car, it sailed into the catch fence separating the track from the front grandstands, then skidded to a halt in the middle of the track. Eight fans were injured by flying debris; the most serious one being a woman who broke her jaw and was taken by helicopter to a nearby hospital. Keselowski earned his first career victory on his fifth career start and earned James Finch his first career victory as an owner in his twentieth year of racing. The race's final lap was the first Sprint Cup lap that Keselowski ever led, and therefore the only lap he led for the entire race; coincidentally this was the first time in history that the very first lap a Sprint Cup driver led was the final lap of a race.

==== Remainder of the 2009 season ====
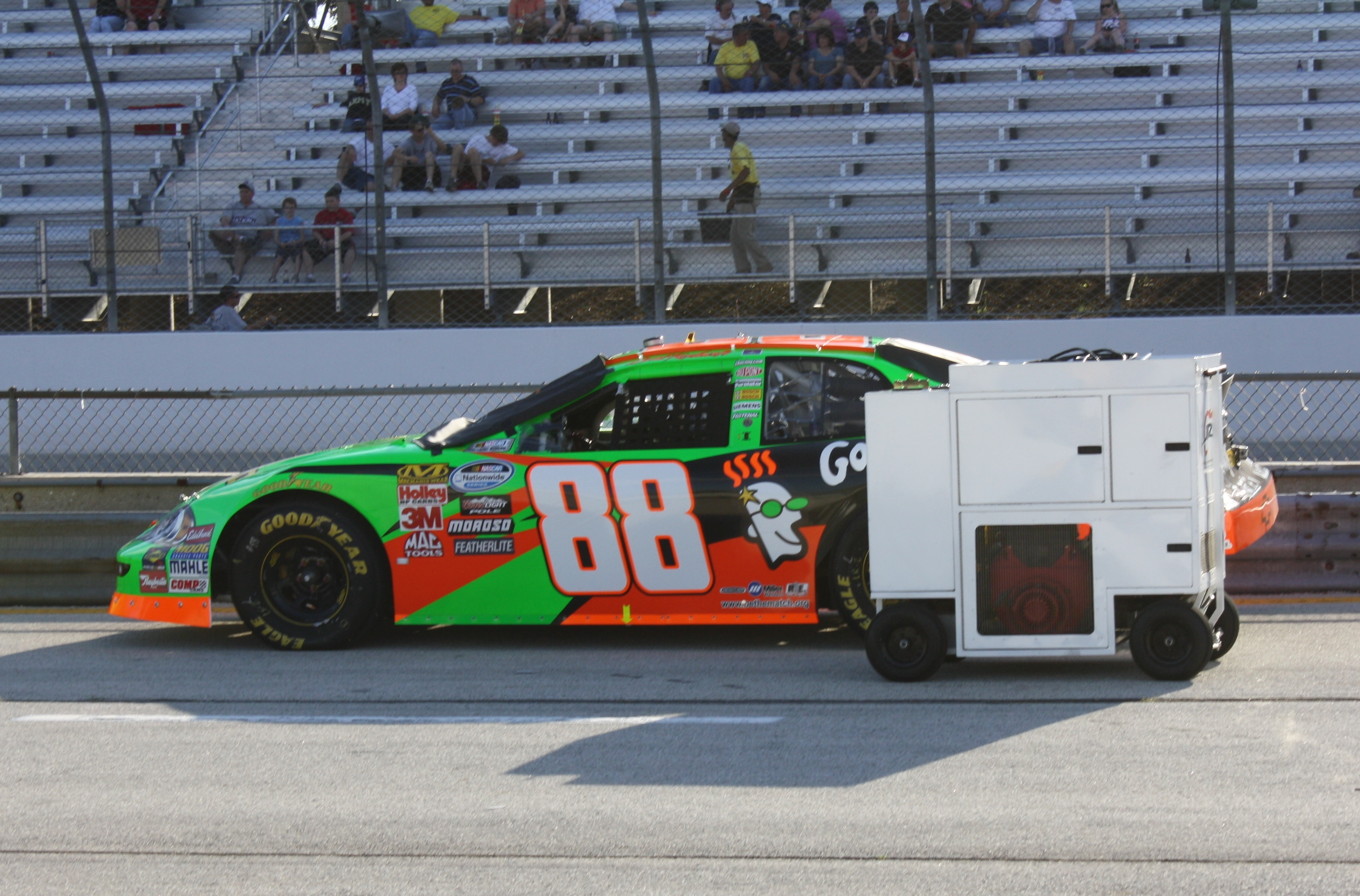
Keselowski's No. 88 GoDaddy.com-sponsored Chevrolet on pit road before the NorthernTool.com 250 at the Milwaukee Mile.

Keselowski's victory at Talladega earned him more seat time in the James Finch-owned Chevy. Originally scheduled to appear next in the 18th race of the season, at Daytona International Speedway, he was then rescheduled to appear in the upcoming race at Richmond International Raceway. Keselowski also was entered into the Sprint All-Star Race as well. He was forced to pull out of the Richmond race due to commitments to his Nationwide Series team.

Keselowski got his third Nationwide Series victory at Dover when Kyle Busch cut a tire on the restart and second-place Joey Logano made contact, allowing Keselowski to pass both.

After taking a gamble and staying out past his pit window, Keselowski garnered his fourth win at the first-ever Nationwide race, the 2009 U.S. Cellular 250, at Iowa Speedway after battling Kyle Busch to take over and maintain the first position. Keselowski finished first over Kyle Busch, though Busch still tied a record with his ninth consecutive top-two finish.

At Montreal in the 2009 NAPA 200, Keselowski had a promising run. After a brief red flag for sprinkles, Keselowski could only hold his spot up in the top fifteen, causing him to lose some spots in the standings. With three laps left, Keselowski barely avoided a pile-up in turn 1 to end up in the fifth spot, earning back his lost points. When the race ended with rival Carl Edwards as the winner, Keselowski among other drivers said that the pile-up and the shocking finish between Marcos Ambrose and Carl Edwards; resembled the finish of the Montreal race in 2007, when Marcos Ambrose almost won but was crashed by Robby Gordon during the confusion of a similar crash in turn 1.

Keselowski's next Nationwide Series victory came in August at the CARFAX 250 at Michigan International Speedway. Pole-sitter Brian Vickers and points-leader Kyle Busch dominated the race, but Keselowski passed them both on the final lap after a blocking move by Vickers on Busch forced both drivers to slow down slightly.

The rest of Keselowski's 2009 season in the Sprint Cup was less than stellar. After the win, he only captured two top-fifteen finishes until November 2009. He met controversy at the fall race in Talladega when he bumped future teammate Kurt Busch going into the tri-oval causing a fifteen-car melee, that included Busch, Jeff Gordon, and Mark Martin - who went upside down after being clipped by Martin Truex Jr. Because Keselowski was already being ridiculed by most of the drivers and fans for how he drove aggressively throughout the races, this wreck earned him some jeers, including a disapproving look from Mark Martin.

In the Nationwide Series, Keselowski also had a series of run-ins with Denny Hamlin. Throughout 2007, 2008, and 2009, Keselowski and Hamlin tangled in many races. After Keselowski punted Hamlin during the autumn Phoenix event in the Nationwide race, Hamlin said he would retaliate. The next week, Hamlin kept his promise, intentionally colliding with Keselowski early in the race. The wreck ended Keselowski's huge chances of beating Kyle Busch for the championship. NASCAR black-flagged Hamlin three laps for aggressive, rough driving, but Hamlin recovered for a top-ten spot. Hamlin was unapologetic in an interview, and while Keselowski also remained unrepentant, saying "I've already moved on," Keselowski got little or no sympathy from most of his fellow competitors.

Keselowski ended up in third spot behind rivals Carl Edwards and Kyle Busch in the final NNS standings.

=== 2010–2021: Penske years ===
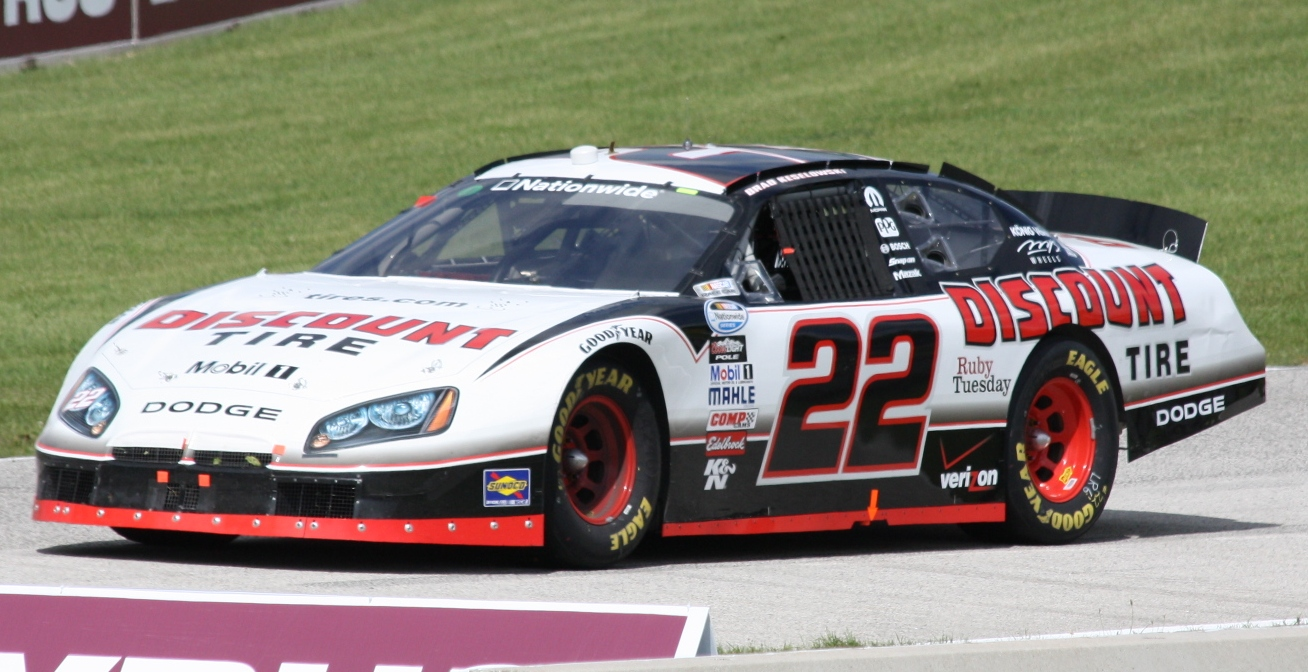
Keselowski's No. 22 Discount Tire Dodge at Road America.

Although Keselowski had rubbed some of his fellow drivers the wrong way with his driving style, the results he produced on the track seemed to indicate that a permanent move to the Sprint Cup Series was an inevitability. Despite his relationship with Dale Earnhardt Jr. and Hendrick Motorsports, the team did not have a car for him to drive full-time as each of their four regular teams already had established drivers under contract. Keselowski began looking elsewhere and left the Chevrolet camp to drive a Dodge for Team Penske.

==== 2010 ====
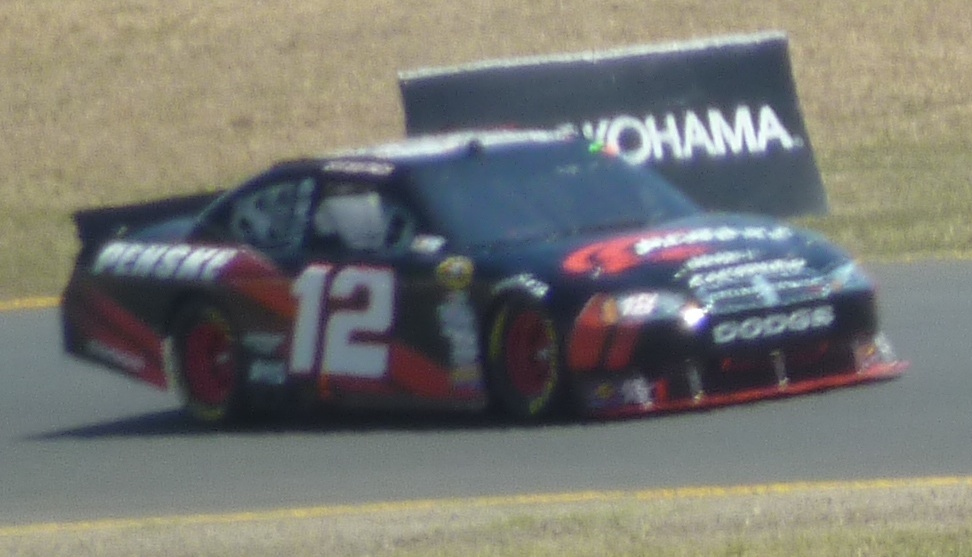
Keselowski's No. 12 during the 2010 Toyota/Save Mart 350

In 2010, Keselowski replaced David Stremme in the No. 12 Dodge Charger in the Cup Series and ran the full Nationwide Series schedule as well in the No. 22 Discount Tire. In Atlanta, on lap 41, Keselowski unintentionally tapped Carl Edwards on a restart, and Edwards went up to the wall to collect Joey Logano. Later, Keselowski appeared to be headed toward a top-five finish at Atlanta with three laps to go when Edwards, apparently in retaliation for this accident, intentionally spun Keselowski. Keselowski's car caught air and, despite the roof flaps working, his car overturned, hitting the front-stretch wall roof-first in an accident that resembled the Talladega finish of the previous year. His new teammate, Kurt Busch, ended up winning the race. Edwards was parked by NASCAR, and Keselowski was physically okay but shaken up from the heavy impact.

Keselowski scored his first 2010 Nationwide win at Talladega on April 25, after crashing out of the Sprint Cup race earlier in the day, and then went on to win five more races at Richmond, Nashville, Michigan, and Charlotte. At Gateway International Raceway in 2010, Brad Keselowski fought rival Carl Edwards again in the closing stages of the Nationwide Race. On the final lap, Keselowski got loose and unintentionally bumped Edwards. Keselowski briefly took the lead, but gave the position back and fell in behind Edwards. The two ran side by side through turns two and three before Edwards ran high in turn 4 and then made a hard left into the right quarter panel of the No. 22, turning him intentionally into the wall hard at the finish line and causing an eleven-car wreck. Keselowski's car came down in front of the field and was hit hard by the car of Shelby Howard. Keselowski climbed out of his car with a grimace on his face and mostly unscathed, though one driver was sent to the hospital with rib injuries. With his team and in victory lane, Edwards was loudly booed as he bragged publicly that the crash was not an accident. Keselowski was infuriated and told a reporter that Edwards just wrecked him for no reason, saying, "I am sure Edwards will say sorry or think about how cool he is in his mind but that is not reality." That week, NASCAR put Edwards on probation for his actions, fined him $25,000, and deducted sixty points from him in the Nationwide Series point standings. NASCAR also placed Keselowski on probation, just in case Keselowski felt the need to pay Edwards back. Both drivers were then told by NASCAR to either calm down the rivalry or face an indefinite suspension from the sport.

At Bristol in the Nationwide Series race, Keselowski was the center of controversy because he was involved in an accident caused by Kyle Busch. In turn 3 with 33 laps left, Busch slid in front of Keselowski, causing Keselowski to bump him. Busch was angry that Keselowski bumped him, so in the next turn, Busch retaliated, by intentionally wrecking Keselowski into the wall. NASCAR did not penalize Busch because they had previously made a rule allowing drivers to police themselves called "Boys have at it." Keselowski finished in 14th instead of possibly contending for the race win. Kyle Busch ended up winning the race and admitted that wrecking Brad was on purpose in a post-race conference. In reply to the crash, Keselowski called Busch "an ass" during driver introductions before the Cup race. Both drivers were given a warning by NASCAR the next week and temporarily placed on probation. In 2012, Keselowski and Kyle Busch announced that they ended their rivalry, though they've had a few run-ins since (Such as when Keselowski and Busch made contact at Watkins Glen in 2012 and Busch crashed Keselowski at Kansas in 2013) that didn't boil over.

The next week at Montreal, Keselowski redeemed himself from Bristol. Keselowski had his greatest finish at the track in fourth. He was in the sixth spot on the restart, but Robby Gordon ran out of gas on the restart, letting Keselowski battle Paul Menard for fourth place. Eventually, as Boris Said and Max Papis had a close, amazing finish for the win, Keselowski had a similar finish with Paul Menard, with Keselowski holding off Menard for the fourth spot.

With crew chief Paul Wolfe all year, Keselowski won his first-ever NASCAR Nationwide Series title, collecting six wins, five poles, 26 top-fives, and 29 top-tens along the way. His 26 top-fives beat Kyle Busch's record of 25 top-fives set in 2009.

In the Sprint Cup, it was a different story. Keselowski finished 25th in the final Sprint Cup standings and recorded one pole, no wins, zero top-fives, and two top-tens.

==== 2011: First Chase appearance ====
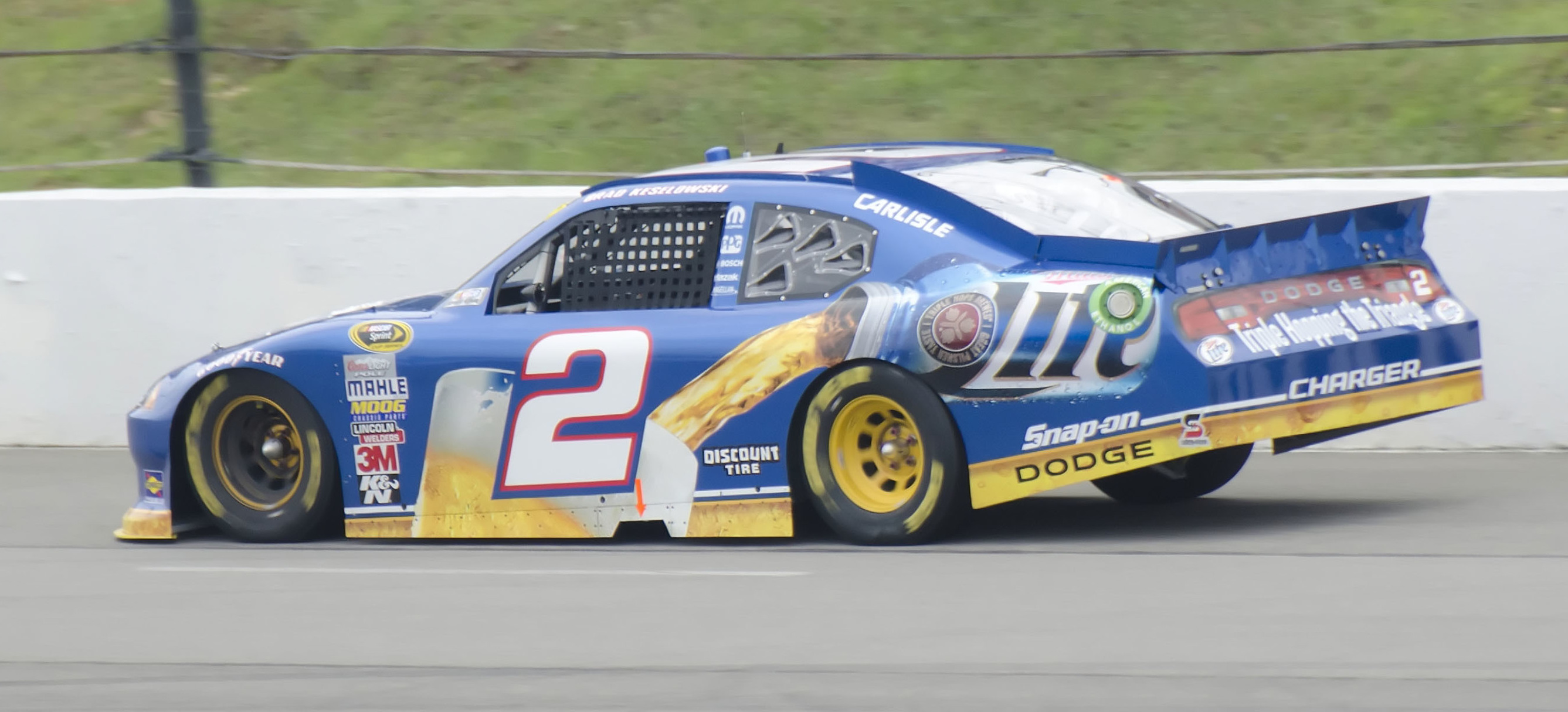
Keselowski's 2011 Good Sam RV Insurance 500 race-winning car

For 2011, Keselowski moved over to Penske's long-time flagship car, the No. 2 Miller Lite-sponsored Dodge. The switch with Kurt Busch, who had driven the car since 2006, occurred due to a sponsorship change and consolidation of operations at the team. Royal Dutch Shell, who had most recently sponsored Kevin Harvick's No. 29 Chevrolet for Richard Childress Racing, signed on to sponsor Penske's second car, which Keselowski had been driving. At the insistence of Shell, the more experienced Busch was moved to the renumbered No. 22 Dodge, and his crew went with him. Keselowski, meanwhile, had his crew follow him to the No. 2, and the team's third unit, the No. 77, which had been driven by Sam Hornish Jr., was dissolved (its sponsor, Mobil 1, had left the team) and its operations merged with Keselowski's team.

Keselowski's Nationwide Series crew chief Paul Wolfe replaced Jay Guy in the Sprint Cup Series; Todd Gordon became Keselowski's crew chief in the NASCAR Nationwide Series.

Keselowski's 2011 Cup season began slowly, but starting in May, his fortunes began to change. He won the pole for the 2011 Coca-Cola 600, and the following week, he was able to get the lead with nine laps to go and hold off a charging Dale Earnhardt Jr. to win the 2011 STP 400 at Kansas Speedway on fuel mileage. During his victory celebration, he ran out of fuel.

While testing at Road Atlanta in August, Keselowski was driving over 200 miles per hour on a straightaway, but his brakes unexpectedly failed. Keselowski could not stop and slammed into a solid concrete wall violently at approximately 190 miles per hour (310 km/h) and broke his left ankle. Keselowski was airlifted to a hospital, claiming he had terrible back pain. Despite racing with injuries, Keselowski won his second race of the season at the Good Sam RV Insurance 500 at Pocono Raceway less than a week after the accident. The win put him into contention to grab one of the two "Wild Card" spots available in the Chase for the Sprint Cup championship.

The next week, Keselowski finished second at the 2011 Heluva Good! Sour Cream Dips at The Glen. He took the lead on a restart with two laps to go but was passed by Marcos Ambrose in turn five of the same lap. A violent crash involving David Reutimann and David Ragan on the last lap forced NASCAR to throw the caution, and Ambrose was declared the winner. Keselowski followed his second-place finish with a third-place finish at the Pure Michigan 400. The next week, Keselowski won his third race of the year at the Irwin Tools Night Race at Bristol.

That win virtually assured Keselowski a spot in the 2011 Chase for the Cup, given NASCAR's rule change designating the final two Chase spots as wild card slots for drivers ranked eleventh through twentieth in the points with the most wins. Keselowski finished the regular season eleventh in points, using his three wins to qualify for his first career Chase.

Keselowski was a factor for much of the Chase before a late spin during the Tums Fast Relief 500 at Martinsville Speedway derailed his championship hopes. Still, Keselowski finished his second full Cup season fifth in the point standings, 84 points behind champion Tony Stewart. Keselowski finished the season with more wins than teammate Busch (three to two) and with a better points finish.

==== 2012: Championship year ====
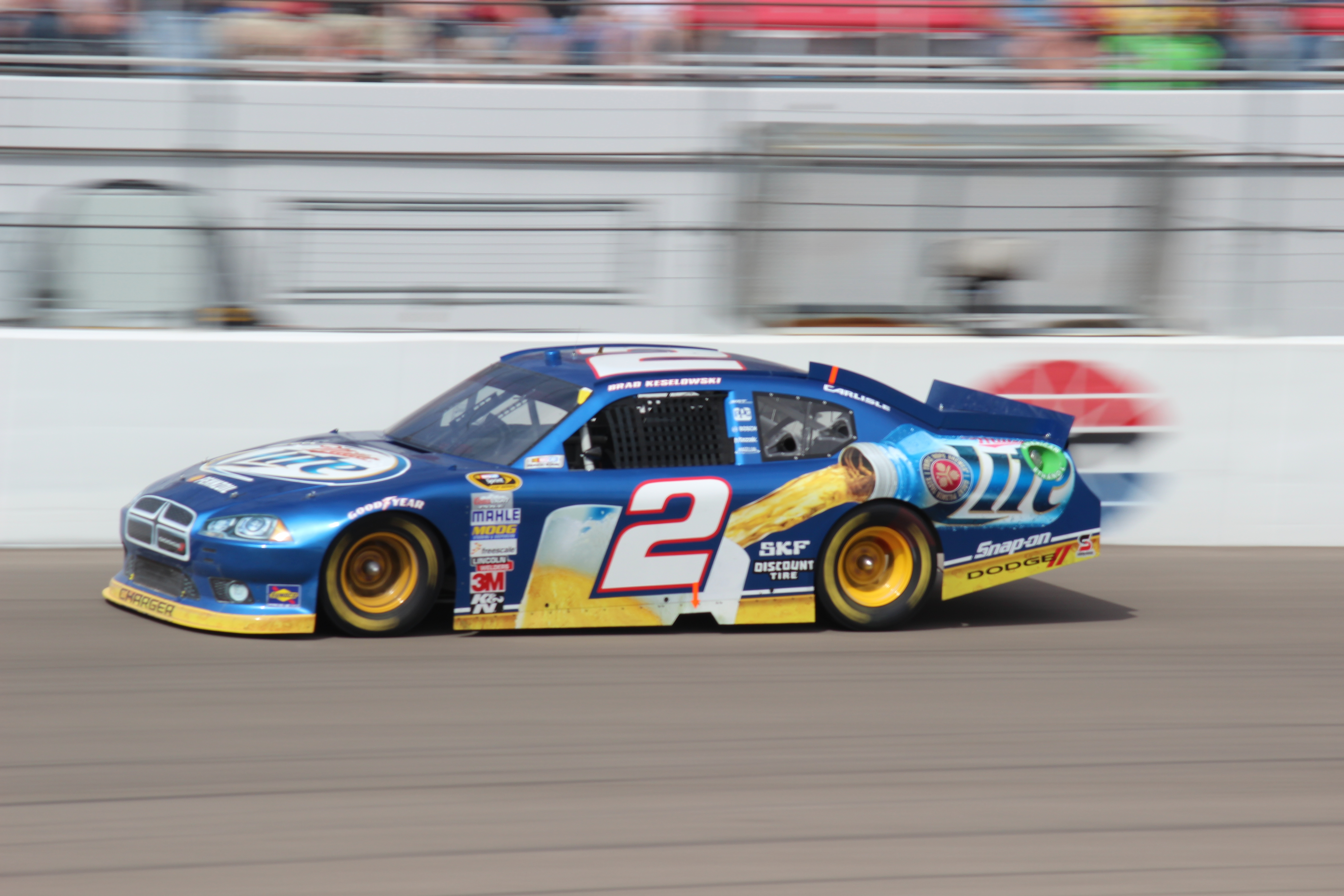
Keselowski's No. 2 Miller Lite Dodge at the Las Vegas Motor Speedway

In addition to continuing running in the Sprint Cup Series and a limited Nationwide Series schedule for Penske Racing, Keselowski has competed in a limited number of Camping World Truck Series races for his own team as a teammate to Parker Kligerman.

Statistically, 2012 was Keselowski's best Sprint Cup season to date: he won five races on the way to winning his first Sprint Cup championship. Keselowski started the year by memorably posting pictures and status updates via Twitter from his car during a red flag period. Cars were stopped on the track when a mechanical failure on Juan Pablo Montoya's car caused it to run into a jet dryer under caution at the Daytona 500, leading to a large fire that damaged the track surface, which had to be repaired before the race could be concluded. Keselowski was caught up in a crash on lap 188 and finished 32nd.

On March 18, 2012, he won his first race of the season, the Food City 500 at Bristol. He also won the Aaron's 499 at Talladega from a late-race restart and a push from Kyle Busch that allowed him to overtake Matt Kenseth. It was the first time since Dave Marcis in 1976 that Dodge won a Sprint Cup Series race at Talladega and only the fourth win at the track for the automaker. (This also proved to be Dodge's last win at the track as the manufacturer left NASCAR following the end of the 2012 season.)

On June 30, 2012, Keselowski picked up his third win at Kentucky Speedway, the first driver to win three races in the 2012 Cup season and joining Kyle Busch as the first two-time Sprint Cup winners of the race at Kentucky. Beginning with Kentucky, Keselowski went on a hot streak that lasted to the season finale at Homestead, ultimately earning him his Sprint Cup title. In these nineteen races, he only finished worse than eleventh twice (30th at Bristol and fifteenth at Homestead).

Keselowski won the first Nationwide Series race to be contested at the Indianapolis Motor Speedway, the Indiana 250. Although Penske Racing had fifteen prior victories in the Indianapolis 500, this was the team's first NASCAR triumph at the track.

In August 2012, Keselowski put himself in second place at the Nationwide race at Watkins Glen. He led the closing stages, but several cautions ended up putting his old rival Carl Edwards in the lead; with two laps to go, Keselowski fell back to second place, and Edwards charged for the win, and in victory lane, he confirmed he and Keselowski no longer dislike each other; Keselowski, in his review, said the same confirmation.

The next day, Keselowski led 37 laps in the Finger Lakes 355 at Watkins Glen. With two laps to go, he was second behind Kyle Busch and had Marcos Ambrose behind him. Busch slipped on oil after taking the white flag, and Keselowski slid into him, spinning him out in the esses. Keselowski then led most of the final lap before Ambrose was able to get by Keselowski in the final turns; Keselowski finished second to Ambrose in an almost carbon-copy repeat of the previous year's finish.

Keselowski notched another second-place finish the following week at Michigan, leading with ten laps to go but being passed by Jimmie Johnson and Greg Biffle. Johnson's engine blew up, leading with six laps to go, giving the race to Biffle. Keselowski's strong showing during the 2012 Sprint Cup season qualified him automatically for the Chase for the Sprint Cup, which he entered in fourth place on account of his three regular-season wins.

In September, he won the first race in the Chase, the GEICO 400 at Chicagoland Speedway. Two weeks after that, he won at Dover after several of the dominant leaders had to pit late for fuel, allowing him to assume the point lead. Keselowski continued on a hot streak of top-eleven finishes: seventh at Talladega, eleventh at Charlotte, and seventh at Kansas, although his point lead over Jimmie Johnson narrowed during this stretch. He lost the point lead to Johnson the following week at Martinsville, finishing sixth while Johnson won. The next week, Keselowski finished second at Texas, racing Johnson hard before relinquishing the lead. His aggressive driving at the end of the race prompted defending champion Tony Stewart to say that Keselowski drove with a 'death wish.'

While Johnson wrecked the following week in Phoenix, Keselowski's sixth-place finish allowed him to reassume the points lead by twenty points. During a red flag period due to Jeff Gordon intentionally crashing Clint Bowyer, Keselowski again tweeted a photo from his car. NASCAR fined Keselowski $25,000 for this, stating that it was prohibited under NASCAR rules (despite NASCAR not having penalized Keselowski for tweeting a photo from his car during the lengthy red flag at the Daytona 500). He qualified third for the finale at Homestead-Miami, but was then moved up to second after pole-sitter Joey Logano was involved in a Saturday practice wreck involving Greg Biffle and Denny Hamlin. Keselowski finished in fifteenth place, but still clinched his first Sprint Cup championship when Johnson dropped out of the race with gear failure, joining Jeff Gordon and Dale Earnhardt as the only drivers to win the Cup championship in their first three full-time seasons. In an interview on ESPN's SportsCenter during the post-race celebration, Keselowski admitted to being "a little buzzed" after consuming plenty of his sponsor, Miller Lite. The video of his interview went viral; interviewer Kevin Connors called it the best interview in SportsCenter's history.

==== 2013: Championship hangover ====
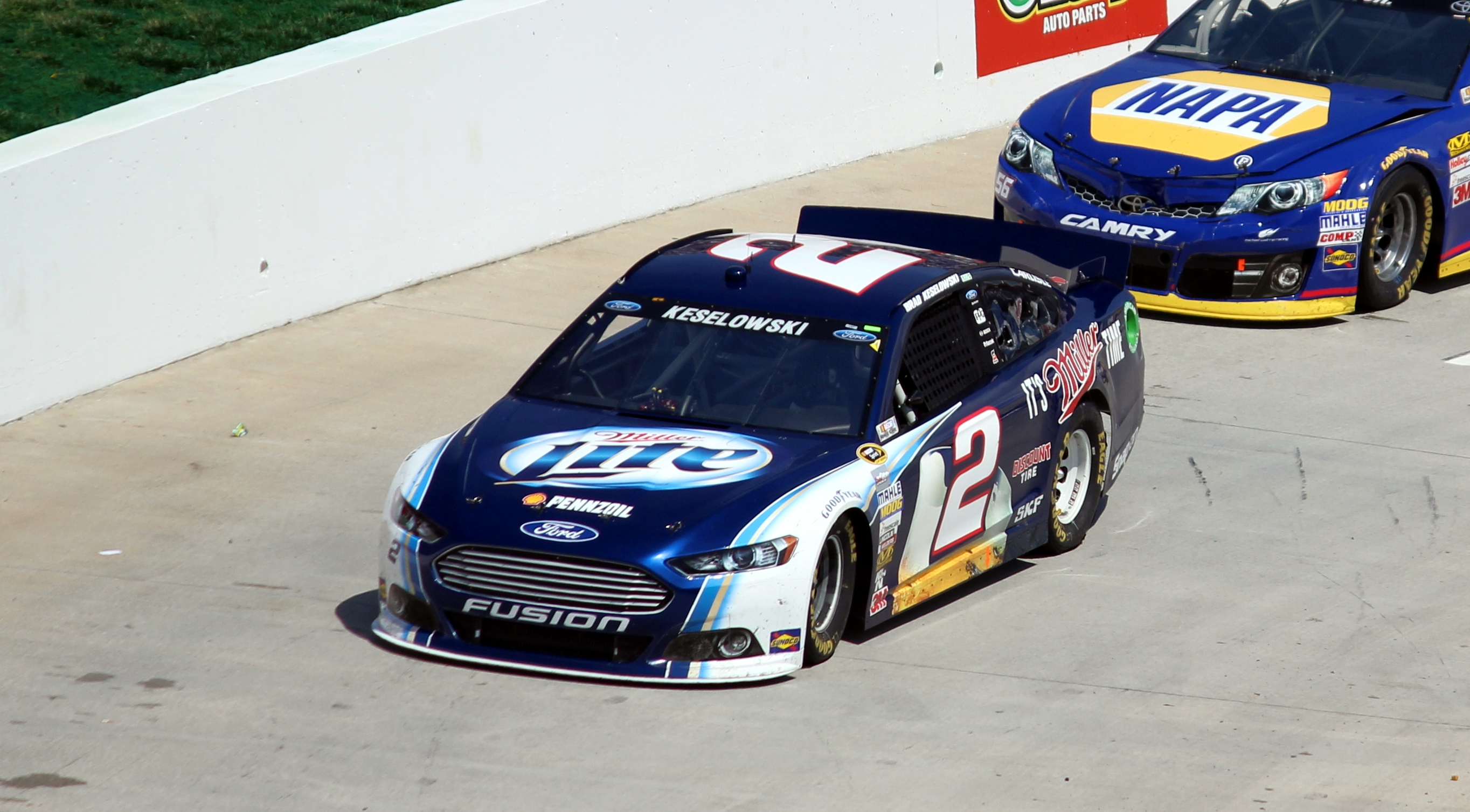
Keselowski during the 2013 STP Gas Booster 500 at Martinsville

Keselowski opened the 2013 season with four straight top-five finishes, including a fourth-place finish in the Daytona 500 despite being caught up in two crashes. He was almost on point to repeat what Dale Earnhardt had accomplished in 1995 – start off the season following his championship with five top-five finishes, but this attempt came to an end at the Auto Club 500, where he finished 24th after dealing with handling issues. He posted three more top-tens in the next three races before suffering a dropped cylinder in his engine towards the end of the Toyota Owners 400 at Richmond International Raceway that relegated him to a 33rd-place finish. From April–May 2013, Keselowski had one of his worst spring starts of a NASCAR season.

At Talladega, Keselowski had a promising run. After a long red flag due to rain, Keselowski was entering the top ten. He drove his way up to contention to win after two crashes. On the last restart, Keselowski started on the low line. Because of a misunderstanding, Keselowski was not happy with the race winner David Ragan after he ended up in the fifteenth spot due to him being told to restart on the not-preferred low line. Ragan lined up on the high side after making a pass on Keselowski under caution. Ragan used the lane and went on to win a race that is considered the biggest upset of 2013.

After climbing out of his car, Keselowski gave a rant on Twitter, accusing David Ragan of lining up improperly and NASCAR allowing a rule violation. Nobody agreed with him, and Keselowski got jeered by fans and media, which further made him frustrated. However, after looking at a video of the finish, Keselowski realized that NASCAR was directing fairly, and that Ragan was fairly in his line; he apologized two days later.

At Darlington, Keselowski finished in 32nd place after being involved in a crash on lap 313. At Charlotte in the All-Star race, Keselowski had one of his most heartbreaking races ever. On lap 2, he lost a transmission. He had to slide 15,000 feet back around the track to get to the garage. His car had broken down from steering problems that would take the rest of the race to fix. Keselowski also attended the Indianapolis 500 to cheer on and direct his Team Penske friend/teammate, Hélio Castroneves. At the Coca-Cola 600 at Charlotte, though, on lap 317, Keselowski was wrecked by Danica Patrick after her off-track boyfriend Ricky Stenhouse made it three-wide. Keselowski subsequently retired from the race, finishing 35th, his first DNF since the 2012 Daytona 500. At Kentucky, Keselowski won the rain-shortened Nationwide race, but in the Sprint Cup race, he was tagged on lap 47 by Kurt Busch, causing a seven-car wreck, and he finished 34th. He then had a 21st-place finish at Daytona in the Coke Zero 400.

At New Hampshire, Keselowski won his first pole of the season. On August 10, 2013, Keselowski won at Watkins Glen in the Nationwide series, giving him four consecutive wins in his last four starts.

At Watkins Glen International in the Cup race, Keselowski recovered from a spin in turn 1 to challenge former Cup rival Kyle Busch for the victory. Keselowski was unable to get by Kyle and finished in second place for the third consecutive time in the event (2011, 2012, and 2013). Brad raced Kyle completely clean, later saying he did it in an attempt to repair their old rivalry. After the event at Watkins Glen International, Keselowski said, "I had nothing for Kyle. He had a great run. Congrats to him and those guys. I could not get by him unless I wrecked him in that final turn, and I didn't want to create drama, so I decided to settle for my second-place spot."

At Michigan, Keselowski nearly scored his first dream Cup victory while in a fuel crisis. Keselowski led with 30 laps left, but caution issues forced him to pit, putting him in the 12th spot for the final results. The only positive side of Keselowski's heartbreak was that through his new teammate, Joey Logano, who won the race, Penske Racing won at the track where they originated. After the race, Keselowski emotionally said that although he was sad about losing, he was happy to have seen his entire team win the race through Logano. On September 5, 2013, Keselowski won his third Nationwide Series race at Richmond, making it five race wins in his last six starts, and his 24th career win in the series. However, he was in danger of being the second defending Sprint Cup champion since Tony Stewart to ever miss the Chase in the next season.

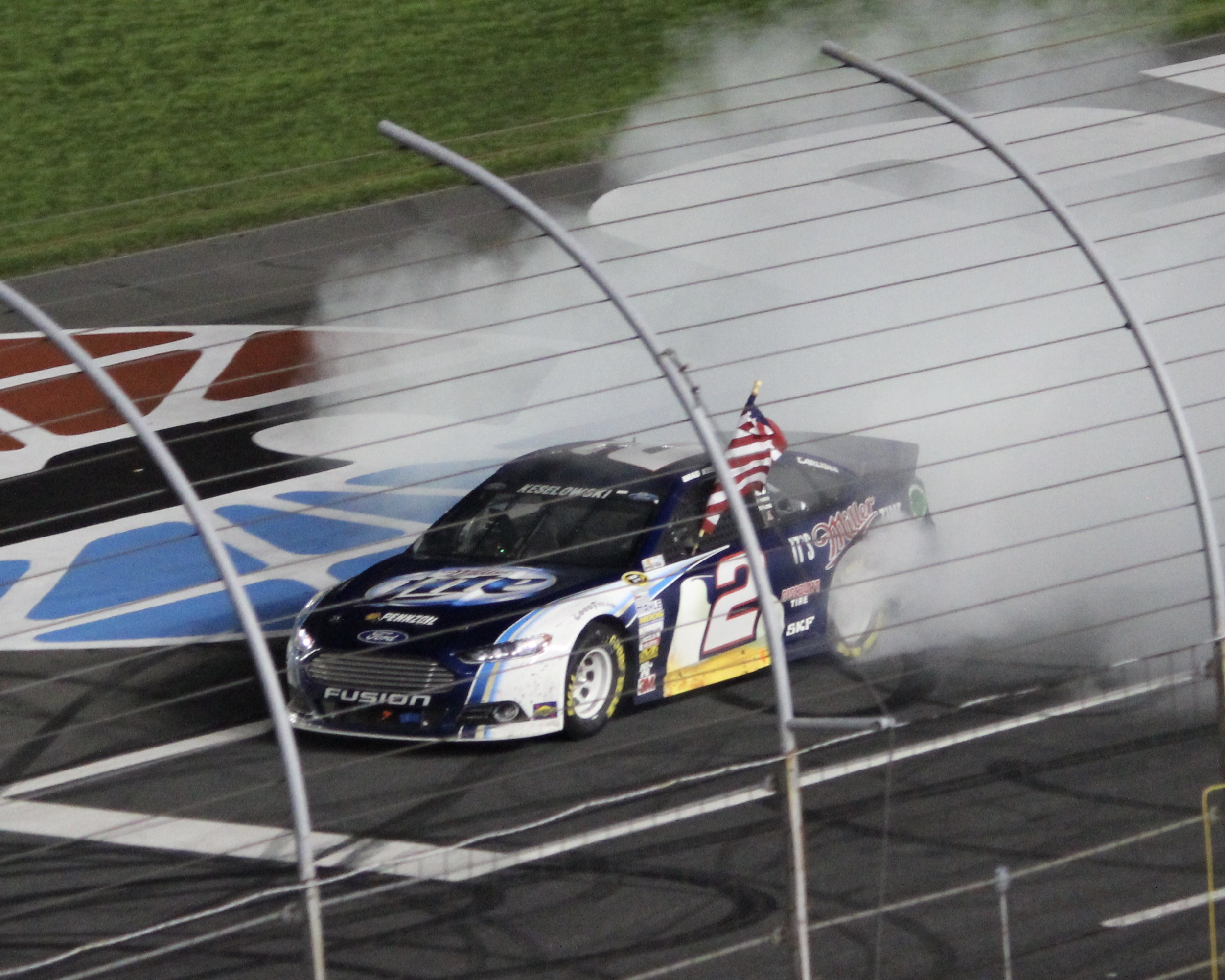
Keselowski celebrates after winning the 2013 Bank of America 500 at Charlotte Motor Speedway.

At Richmond, Keselowski led the most laps with 142, but a late caution during the race caused him to finish seventeenth and miss the Chase due to being sixteenth in the points standings. On October 2, Keselowski signed a contract extension with Penske Racing to remain with the team until 2017.

At Charlotte, Keselowski started well, though he was penalized early when he left his pit during a pit stop under caution, carrying the jack with him. He rallied to the last caution and took the last restart in fourth. After battling Kasey Kahne for the lead with fifteen laps remaining, Keselowski took the point and captured the win. This was Keselowski's first win driving a Ford, snapping a 38-race winless streak, and also the first Chase race won by a "spoiler" (non-Chaser) since Kahne won at Phoenix in November 2011.

==== NRA 500 controversy ====
His car and teammate Joey Logano's car each failed pre-race inspections at the NRA 500 at Texas Motor Speedway due to an issue with the cars' rear-end housings. Keselowski was able to start the race from his original qualifying position as his car cleared inspection as driver introductions were ending, while Logano was forced to start from the back of the field because he didn't pass inspection in time to line up in the starting grid. After the race, Keselowski told members of the news media that he felt the Penske teams had been targeted by NASCAR. Both drivers finished the race in the top ten, with Keselowski finishing ninth.

On Wednesday, April 17, 2013, NASCAR announced penalties related to the rear-housing infraction discovered in Keselowski and Logano's cars before the NRA 500: Keselowski's crew chief Paul Wolfe, car chief Jerry Kelley, team engineer Brian Wilson, and Penske competition director Travis Geisler were all suspended for the next six races, including the non-points Sprint All-star Race. Wolfe was also fined $100,000, and Keselowski was docked 25 driver points. Identical penalties were also handed down to all of the people in the same positions on Logano's team. Penske Racing released a statement saying the organization planned to appeal the penalties, but on May 1, the NASCAR Appeals Panel unanimously upheld the penalties. Team owner Roger Penske said he would further appeal the ruling to NASCAR Chief Appellate Officer John Middlebrook.

==== 2014: Redemption ====
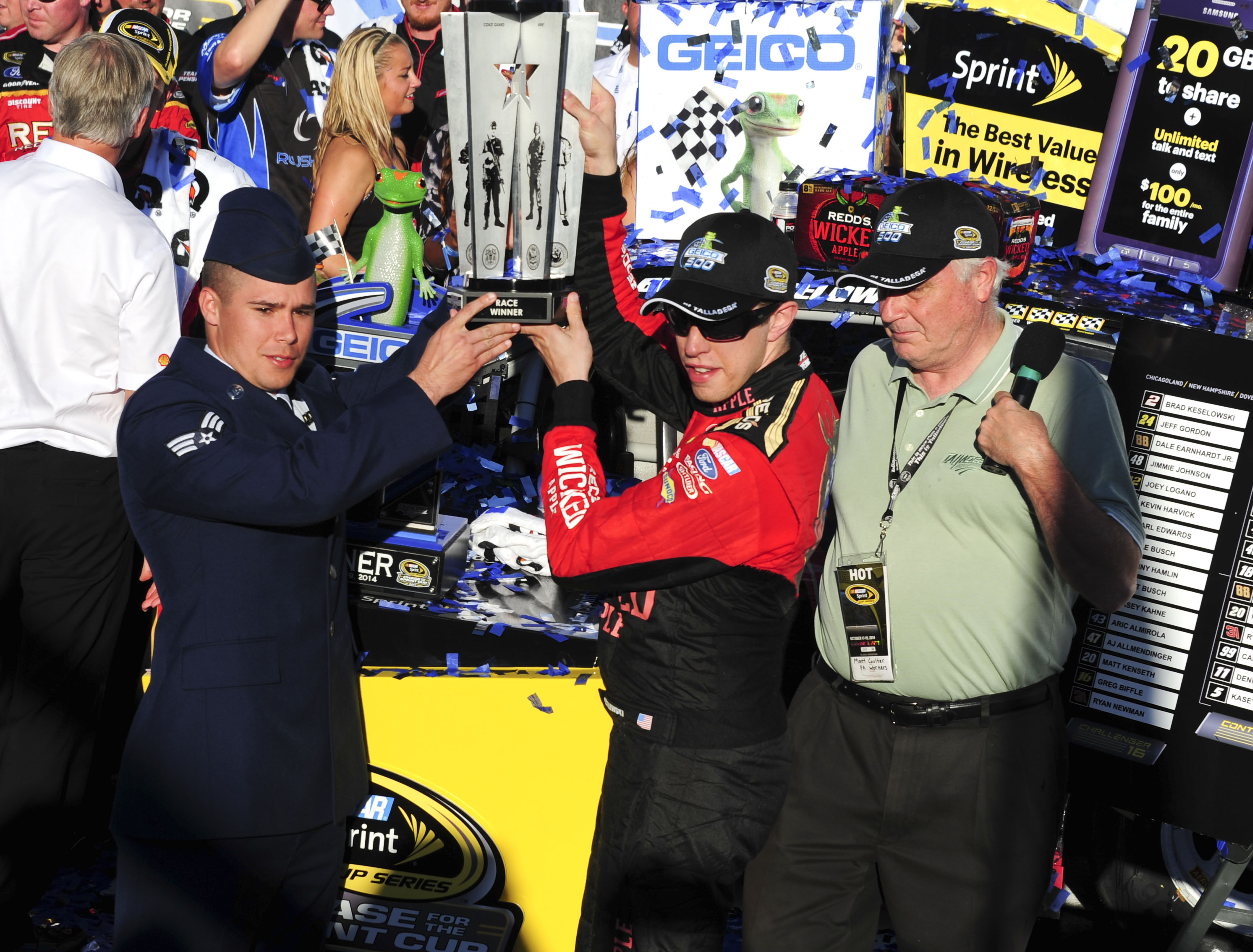
Keselowski after winning the 2014 GEICO 500 at Talladega

Keselowski started his 2014 season by finishing second to Denny Hamlin in the Sprint Unlimited.

In the Budweiser Duel, Keselowski led 34 laps early, until the cycle of green-flag pit stops. However, he was caught speeding and ended up finishing last, three laps down. He still made the Daytona 500 under an owner's points provisional. In the Daytona 500, Keselowski started 33rd, led thirteen laps, and finished third.

At Phoenix, Keselowski clinched his first pole of the season with a record lap speed of 139.384 mph (224.317 km/h). He was the first driver to win a pole position under the two-round version of the new "knockout" qualifying procedure. Keselowski led three laps and finished third.

At Las Vegas, Keselowski and Joey Logano swept the front row again, with Logano winning the pole. He led 53 laps and overtook Dale Earnhardt Jr. for the lead on the last lap after Earnhardt Jr. ran out of fuel to score his first win of the season. Keselowski was very emotional about his win because it automatically qualified him in the Chase; redemption from 2013 when he did not make the Chase.

At Martinsville, a few weeks later, Keselowski got into a feud with former Penske teammate Kurt Busch. On pit road, Keselowski stopped for a stalled Kasey Kahne. Kurt didn't react in time and rammed Brad from behind. Keselowski replied by giving Busch a hand gesture on the track at lap 87. Kurt Busch threatened to "(expletive) Brad's face up." Kurt calmed down and went on to win the race. This incident remains a topic of debate.

Keselowski nearly won the Toyota Owners 400 a few weeks later but engaged in a battle with Matt Kenseth and Jeff Gordon, which allowed teammate Joey Logano to take the lead and ultimately the win with four laps left. Kenseth had repeatedly blocked Keselowski, trying to keep him from winning the race. Keselowski showed displeasure with Kenseth after the race, pointing his finger at him and throwing his gloves into his car. Keselowski called Kenseth's blocking "mind-boggling". However, though Keselowski was upset with Kenseth, he jumped onto the hood of Logano's car and gave him a thumbs-up. Keselowski and Logano are great friends off and on track.

A week later at Talladega, Keselowski tried to go for the lead on lap thirteen, but when the leader, Danica Patrick, tried to slide behind Keselowski, she got into his left-rear quarter panel and wrecked him. Later in the race, Keselowski was trying to regain his final lap back but got loose and spun. Fourteen cars wrecked as they attempted to avoid Keselowski's spin. During the controversy over his spin, Keselowski said in an interview that it was not on purpose and apologized on television and in a tweet on Twitter. The victims of the wreck, fellow racers, and many fans were upset with Keselowski for his actions, as it appeared that Keselowski was setting a double standard following his altercation with Matt Kenseth the previous week. Jeff Gordon is most notably one of the victims who called out Keselowski for his spin, as well as Matt Kenseth (collected in the crash), who expressed his displeasure against Keselowski by using Brad's "mind-boggling" comment from Richmond against Brad.

The outcry of the Talladega spin sort of resembled the controversial pace-lap accident before the start of the 1982 Indianapolis 500 given that in both situations a controversial driver (Kevin Cogan, or Keselowski) spun out for no apparent reason and wrecked several cars, causing an outcry of controversy & given the fact that both Cogan and Keselowski drove for Penske at the time.

Keselowski finished 2nd to Johnson at Dover. At Pocono, Keselowski took the lead from Justin Allgaier with less than nineteen laps to go. On the final restart, a trash bag lodged in Keselowski's grille, causing overheating. With four laps to go, Keselowski tried to use the lap-down car of Danica Patrick to blow the trash off his grille, which cost him the win as Dale Earnhardt Jr. took advantage of Keselowski slowing to pass him for the win.

A week later at Michigan, Keselowski finished third, which marked his third consecutive top-three finish. Keselowski himself is a Michigan native and said that winning the Michigan race would mean more to him than just winning the Daytona 500. At Sonoma, Keselowski wrecked himself on lap eleven after he threw a failed block attempt on Kyle Busch. After the wreck, he struggled to a 23rd-place finish.

At Kentucky, Keselowski raced in all three series (CWTS, NNS, and NSCS) and nearly won both the truck race and the Nationwide race, but came up just short. Keselowski, however, dominated the Sprint Cup race and got his second win of the season. Keselowski said his team was in "championship form". Keselowski made the headlines when his hand got severely injured by a champagne bottle during the victory lane celebration. Keselowski was rushed to the hospital and released after getting stitches.

At Daytona, Keselowski got caught up in both Big Ones but finished eighteenth, one lap down, by the time the race was called for rain.

Keselowski had a perfect weekend in New Hampshire when he won both Cup series practices, the pole for the Nationwide race, and led one hundred and fifty-five laps to win the Nationwide race. In the Cup race, Keselowski started seventh and moved to the lead early in the race to win his second Cup race in three weeks, his third of the year, and sweep the weekend.

At Iowa in the Nationwide Series, Keselowski qualified on the front row beside Ford Racing teammate, Trevor Bayne. Keselowski passed Michael McDowell with two laps to go to win the race. This was Keselowski's third Nationwide Series victory of the season.

At Bristol in August, Keselowski won his first Camping World Truck Series race and became the twenty-fifth driver to record wins in all three of NASCAR's major series. He joined Aric Almirola as one of two drivers to record the feat in 2014. Keselowski had never won a Truck race in his previous 63 starts. The win also marked Ford's first truck win in the 2014 season. In the Sprint Cup race, Keselowski finished second to teammate Joey Logano after leading many laps. Keselowski would later win the Federated Auto Parts 400 at Richmond, the 400th win for Penske.

At the Charlotte race in October, while under caution with six laps remaining, controversy struck Keselowski when, during caution laps, Matt Kenseth slammed into Keselowski's right front in response to a previous restart where Keselowski and Kenseth made unintentional contact. After the race, Denny Hamlin brake-checked Keselowski, due to being upset that Keselowski raced him hard. While driving onto pit road, Keselowski hit Kenseth in the door as retaliation for the incident that happened with six to go. When Keselowski began walking to his hauler, Kenseth physically attacked him from behind, and he had to be restrained by Keselowski's crew chief Paul Wolfe. During a later interview, Keselowski stated on lap 333 that Kenseth had "swung at [his] car and tore the whole right-front off of it." Keselowski voluntarily went to the Oval Office but was fined $50,000 and placed on probation along with Tony Stewart, who was fined $25,000. NASCAR stated in the penalty announcement that the main reason Keselowski was fined was that he made contact with Kenseth after the race had already ended. Despite this incident, Keselowski won at Talladega the following week, which allowed him to advance to the Eliminator Round of the Chase.

During the AAA Texas 500, Keselowski once again was the center of controversy. On a green-white-checkered restart, Jeff Gordon entered the turn going to the high lane, leaving the middle lane open. Keselowski decided to go for it and try the same three-wide move on Gordon and Jimmie Johnson that he had done to win at Chicagoland, and Keselowski made contact with Gordon's rear quarter panel that cut down Gordon's left-rear tire, sending Gordon into a spin that relegated him to falling one lap down and finishing in 29th place, while Keselowski finished third. Following the race, Gordon approached Keselowski on the pit road over the incident while both drivers were being surrounded by their pit crews. However, it escalated into a brawl due to Keselowski being shoved from behind by Kevin Harvick, who had wanted Keselowski to fight Gordon. The brawl ended up involving the crew chiefs of both teams as well as other members from Kasey Kahne, Danica Patrick, and Paul Menard's teams. Both Gordon and Keselowski sustained facial injuries. He finished fourth in the 2014 Quicken Loans Race for Heroes 500, but it wasn't enough for him to advance to the final round. He was the highest-ranking driver outside of the final four at the end of the season. He also had set a personal best record of six victories throughout the season, which was the highest number of wins for anyone in the 2014 season.

==== 2015 ====
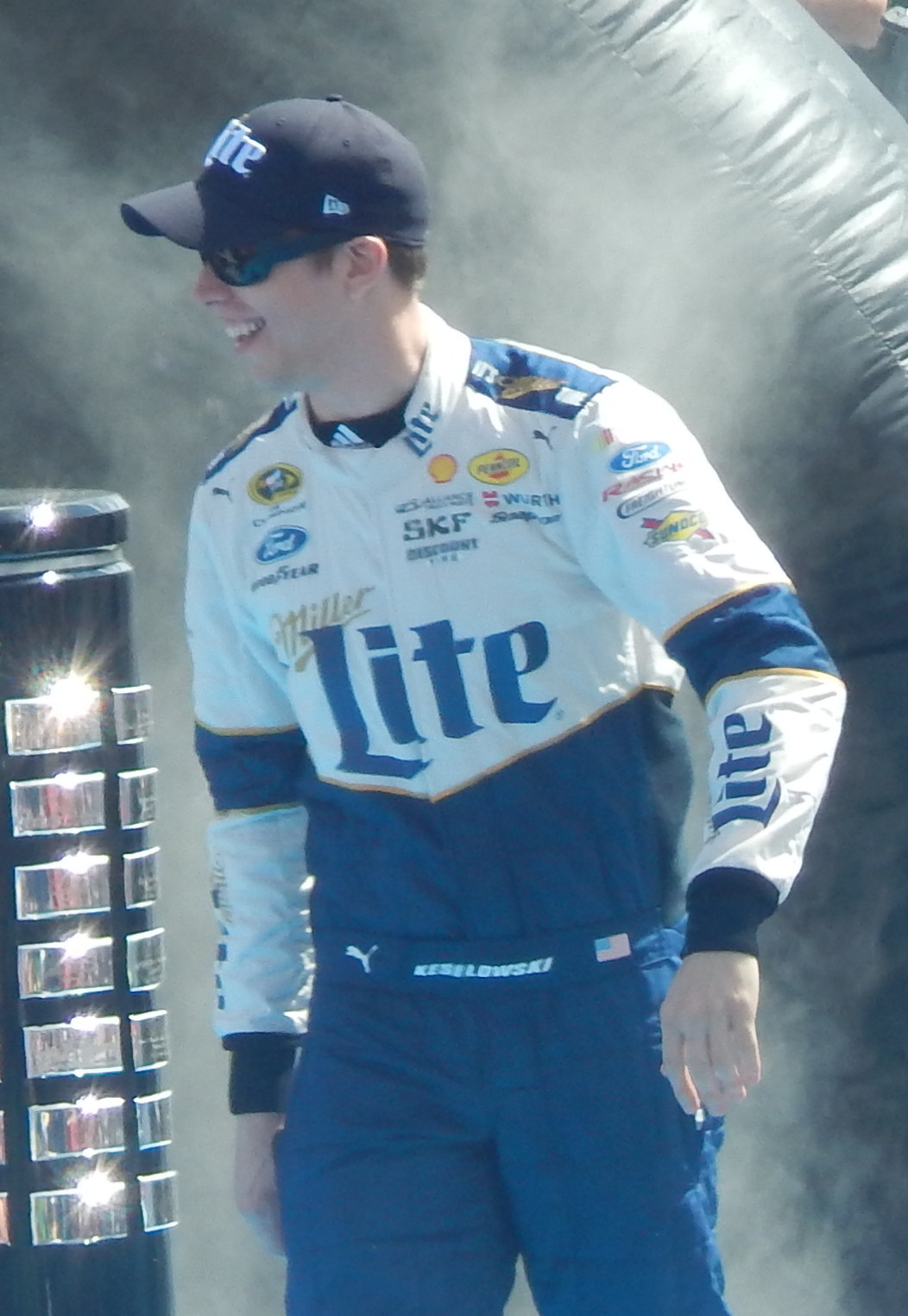
Keselowski at the 2015 Daytona 500

On January 25, 2015, Jeff Gluck of USA Today stated Keselowski was hired, along with Jeff Gordon and Kevin Harvick, as an Xfinity Series analyst for NASCAR on Fox. Keselowski would be in the booth for the Atlanta, Phoenix, and Richmond races.

Keselowski's season got off to a rocky start. During the Sprint Unlimited, after starting fourth, running in the top-ten for the first few laps, and leading a few laps, Keselowski wrecked after slight contact from fellow driver Kyle Larson. He finished 25th, in last place. Days later, Keselowski led the waning stages of the Daytona 300 in the Xfinity Series event. While leading on the final lap, Keselowski's momentum slowed down, which allowed Ryan Reed to pass him for the lead and win the event. Keselowski finished fifth. The race was overshadowed by Kyle Busch's horrific crash with eight laps to go.

Keselowski led early at Phoenix, leading 52 laps, but lost a critical amount of track position after his team made the mistake of not pitting before a caution with less than 142 laps to go. Restarting 29th after the caution, Keselowski raced his way back to the top ten, finishing 6th.

The next week at California was a victorious weekend for Keselowski. After a late-race restart, Keselowski impressively passed Kurt Busch on the final lap to win the race.

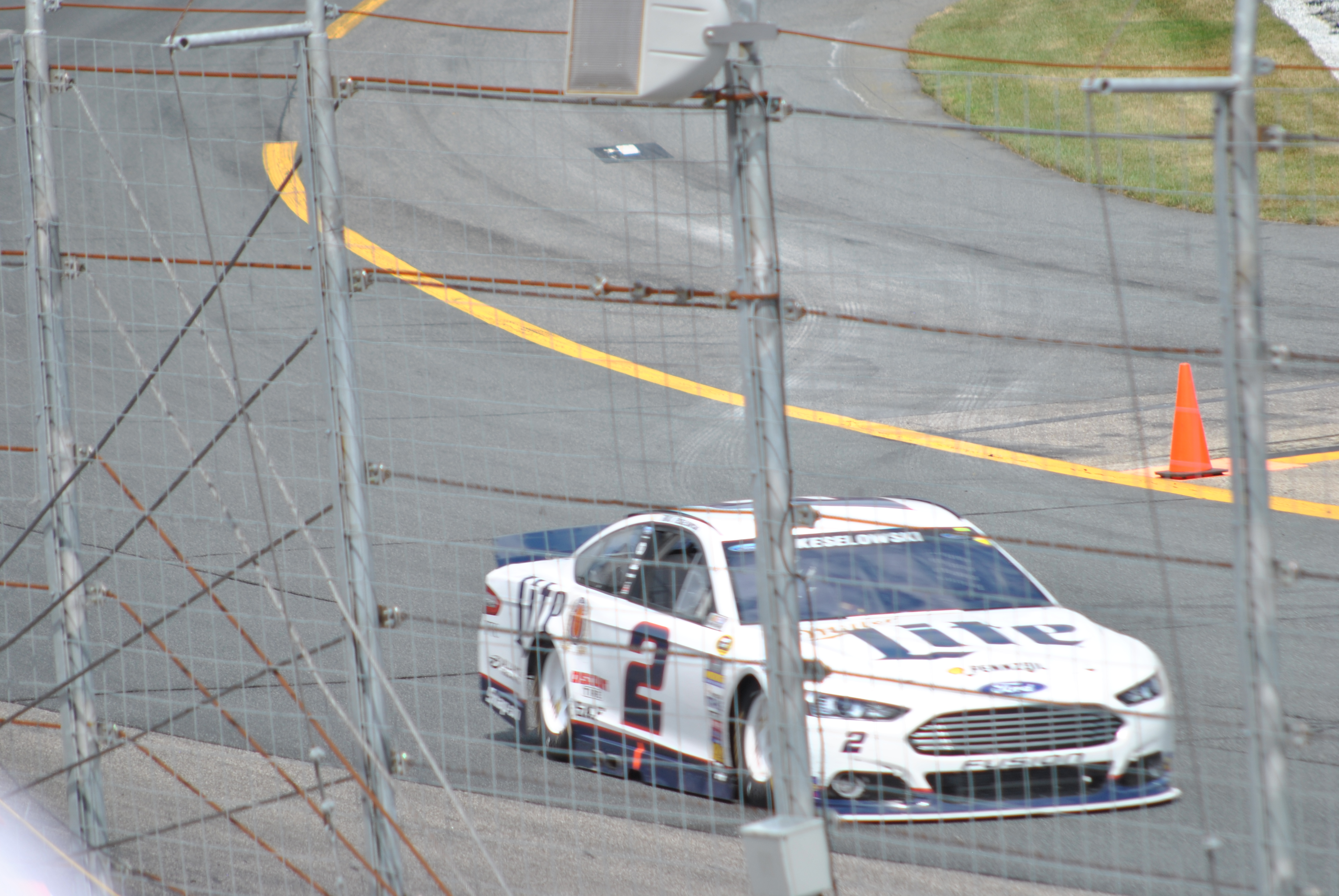
Keselowski racing at New Hampshire Motor Speedway in 2015

Keselowski finished second the next week at Martinsville, being beaten by rival Denny Hamlin by 0.3 seconds. He had the fastest car in the final laps, but he was unable to win the race because after restarting 4th, he was unable to get by Matt Kenseth or Joey Logano, quickly enough as Hamlin, to challenge Hamlin for the win.

Keselowski had a dismal summer but still made the Chase for the Cup. Keselowski led 52 laps at Martinsville but got taken out of the race from contact with Matt Kenseth on a restart with 49 laps left. His crash set up the controversial wreck with Kenseth and teammate Joey Logano.

At Texas, Keselowski started on the pole and led the most laps (312 of 334). However, he got overtaken by Jimmie Johnson after a caution period with less than ten laps to go. Keselowski finished second. Keselowski was eliminated from the final four spots of the Chase after finishing badly at Phoenix. Keselowski led the most laps of the Ford 400, but a late-race caution cost him the race, finishing 3rd behind Kyle Busch, who won the race and the 2015 Cup series championship.

Keselowski's season was more disappointing than his 2014 campaign. He finished out the season with one win, nine top-fives (five of which were runners-up), 25 top-tens, three poles, and one DNF.

==== 2016 ====
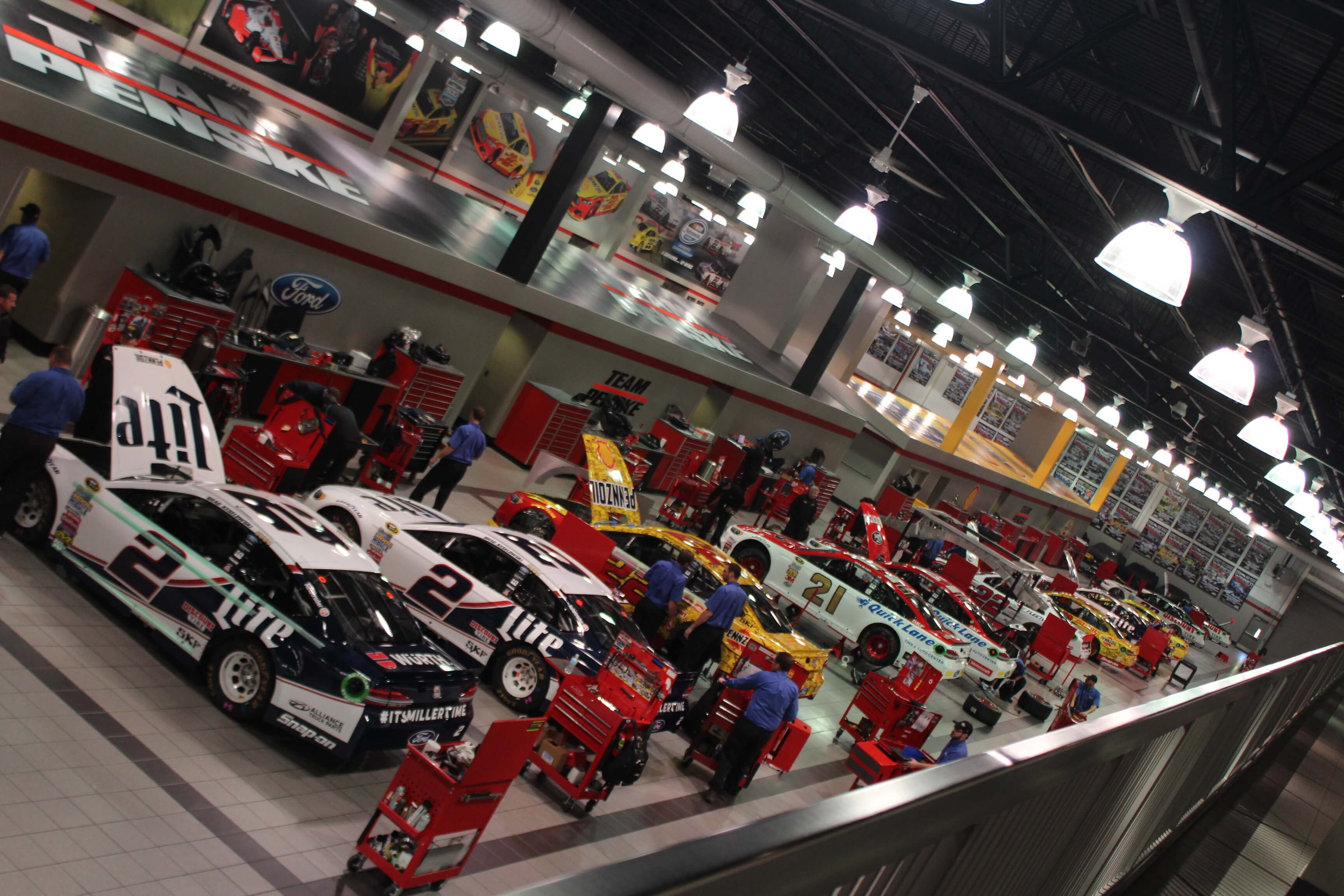
Keselowski and Team Penske's 2016 cars inside their Mooresville shop

Keselowski started his season on a high note, leading the most laps of the Sprint Unlimited at Daytona. A late-race caution kept him from winning the race. Keselowski recovered from a bad pit stop to finish ninth. Keselowski didn't have any promising races at Daytona and Atlanta. However, he got his first Cup win of the season at Las Vegas, passing Kyle Busch with six laps to go. Keselowski also won the tenth race of the season, the GEICO 500 at Talladega. He started seventh and led the most laps, 46 laps. He used the outside line to take the lead on lap 73 and swapped the lead with NASCAR driver Denny Hamlin multiple times before blocking the three-wide lines. When NASCAR came back to Daytona, Brad would have the best car all night and led the most laps to win the Coke Zero 400 and get his third win of the season. Following that, at Kentucky, he would get his fourth win of the season, and second consecutive win, after a lengthy last seventy laps trying to conserve fuel. Keselowski made it through the first round of the Chase, but in the second round, he was eliminated. At Charlotte he would finish seventh, the next week at Kansas he was running in the top-ten but with 77 laps to go, Keselowski got loose and spun through the infield, tearing up his splitter and going to the garage and finishing 38th. Coming to Talladega, Keselowski was in a must-win situation. He started second and had the dominant car leading ninety laps, but with less than fifty laps remaining, he got a piece of debris on the grille and blew his engine, going to the garage and finishing 38th for the second week in a row. His teammate Joey Logano would go on to win the race. He would be eliminated from the Round of 12.

==== 2017: First Championship 4 appearance ====
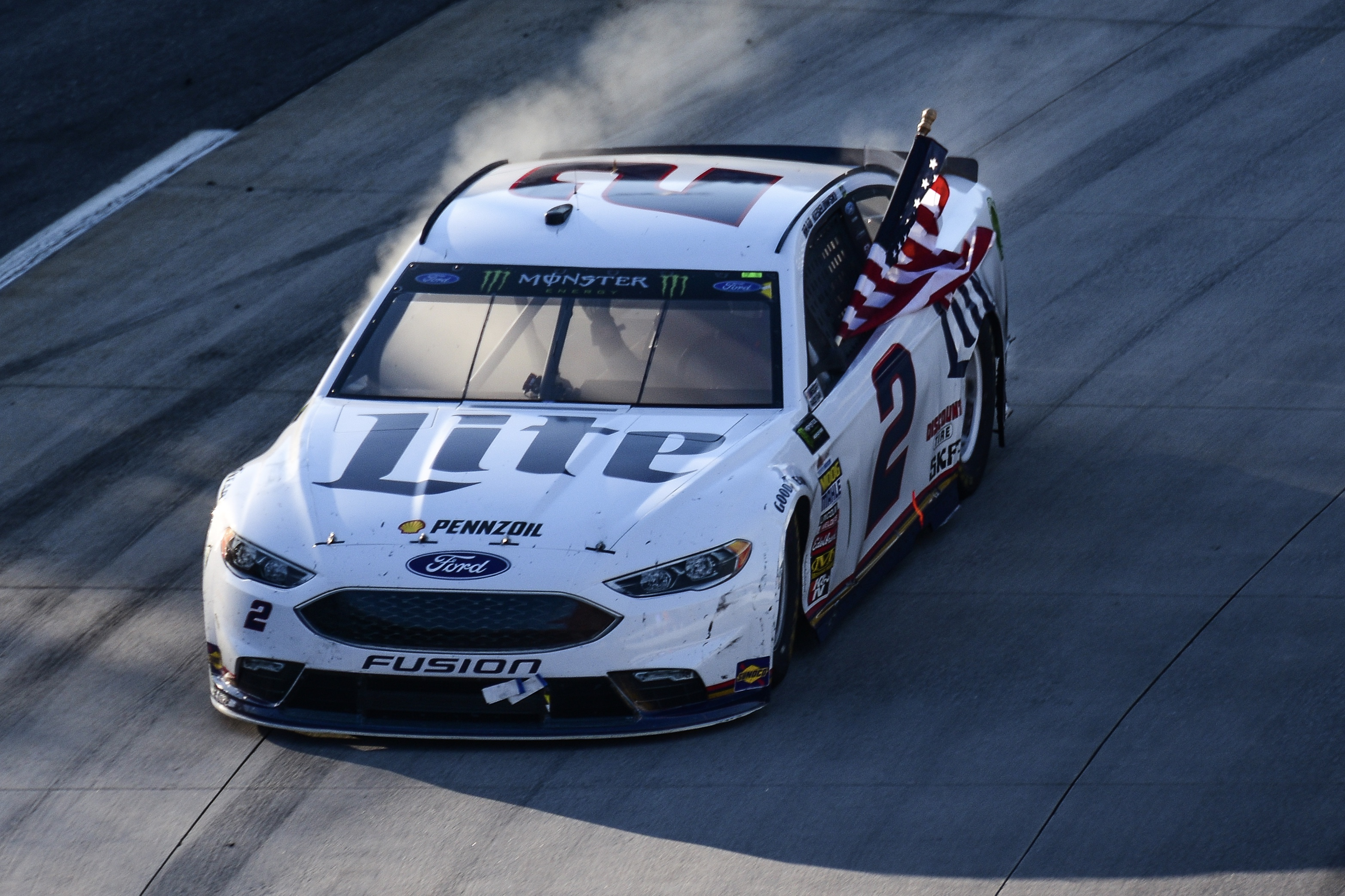
Keselowski's victory lap after winning the 2017 STP 500 at Martinsville Speedway

Keselowski crashed out of the 2017 Daytona 500 after leading thirteen laps during the race. At Atlanta, Keselowski suffered from various pit issues, including being forced to pit for a flat tire and loose lug nuts, as the race was dominated by the Ford of Kevin Harvick. On the final restart with eleven laps to go, Harvick was issued a speeding penalty and sent to the rear, enabling Keselowski to start on the front row alongside Kyle Larson. After battling with Larson, Keselowski successfully passed him to record the win.

After the Camping World 500 at Phoenix International Raceway, NASCAR announced that Keselowski's car had failed post-race laser inspection. Two days later, NASCAR penalized Keselowski with a $65,000 fine, a 35-point deduction, and a three-race suspension for crew chief Paul Wolfe. In the 2017 Auto Club 400, Keselowski spun early but rebounded to finish second. After having Paul Wolfe serve one of the three-race suspensions, Team Penske announced plans to appeal the penalty and was granted a deferral of the remainder of the penalty, including the points and fine.

Keselowski's second victory of the season came at Martinsville after passing Kyle Busch on lap 458. This was Keselowski's first win at the track, as well as the first there for Ford in fifteen years.

After Martinsville, Team Penske's appeal was heard. After a three-hour hearing, the appeal was denied by the National Motorsports Appeals Panel. Team Penske requested a final hearing with the National Motorsports Final Appeals Officer, Bryan Moss. Moss wasn't able to preside over the hearing due to illness, so NASCAR had a former USAC president, Roger Werner, preside over the hearing. The appeal was denied on May 9, leaving Wolfe suspended from the sport.

It was confirmed that Keselowski would return to Team Penske for the 2018 season.

==== 2018: Crown Jewel victories ====
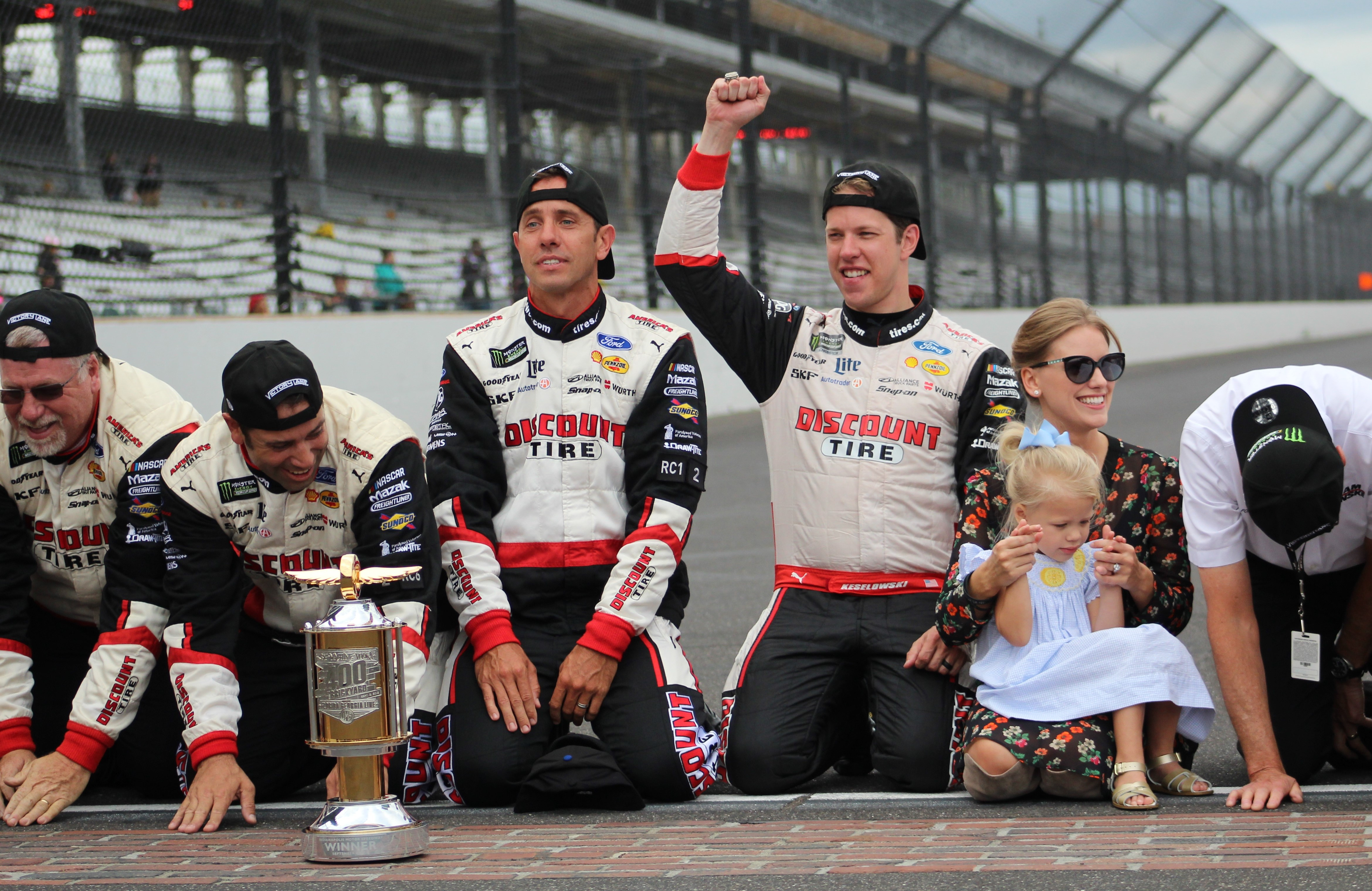
Keselowski celebrating after winning the 2018 Brickyard 400

The 2018 season started slow for Keselowski, as he failed to win at the first 24 races. He then won back-to-back races at Darlington and Indianapolis, giving Team Penske its first victory in the Brickyard 400, which was a highly coveted win for Team Penske given their history at the Indianapolis Motor Speedway and the Indy 500. Keselowski backed up his playoff run with a win at Las Vegas, giving Roger Penske his five-hundredth overall motorsports victory as a car owner and advancing him to the Round of 12, despite surviving a hard crash at the Charlotte Roval. Keselowski was eliminated from the Round of 12 after the fall Kansas race and finished the season eighth in the points standings.

==== 2019 ====
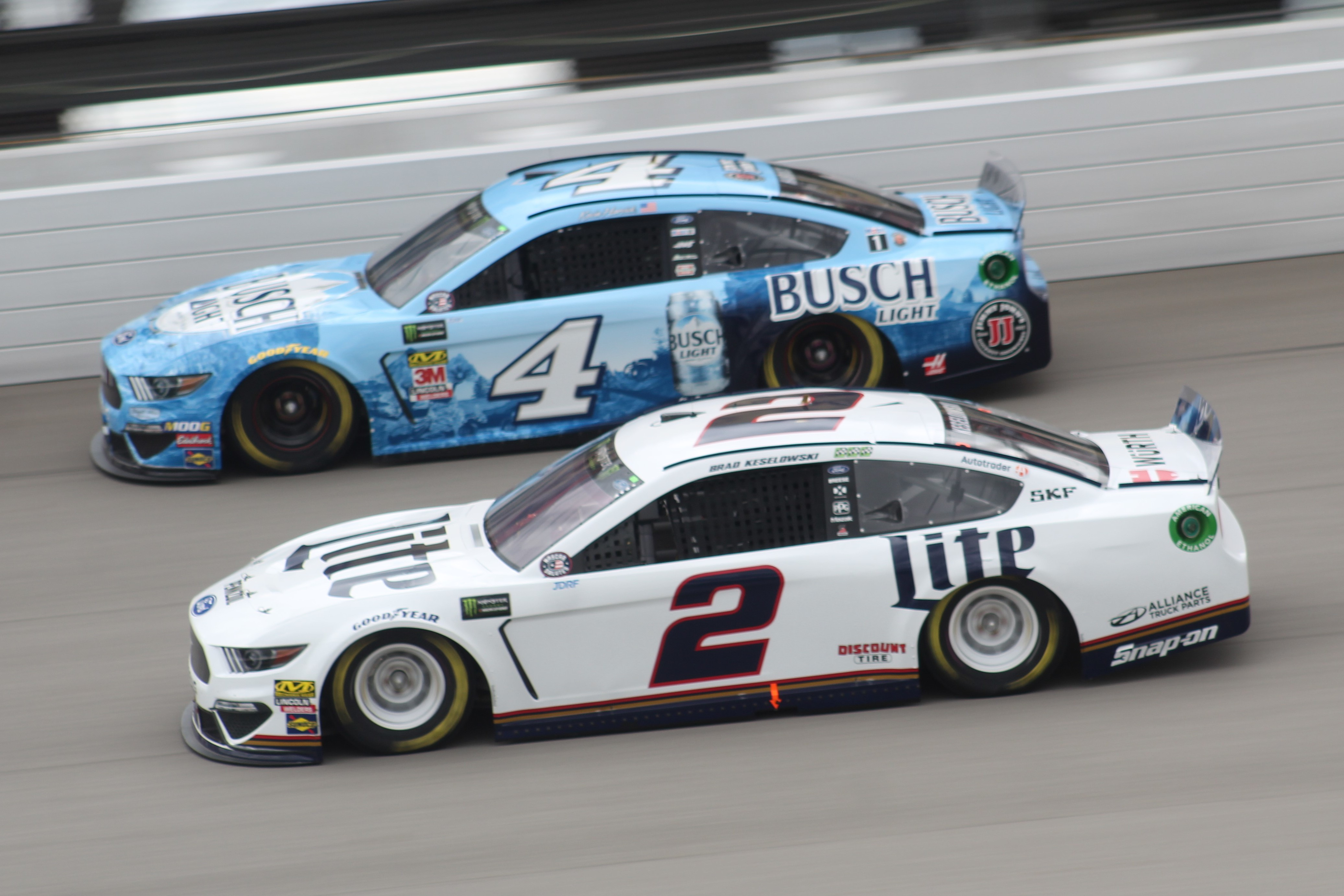
Keselowski racing alongside Kevin Harvick at the Michigan International Speedway

Keselowski started the 2019 season with a twelfth-place finish at the Daytona 500. A week later, he won at Atlanta after battling flu-like symptoms; this gave him his sixtieth overall win with Team Penske and the first MENCS win for the new Ford Mustang GT. Keselowski followed this up with wins at Martinsville and Kansas. Keselowski dominated the early stages of the Coke 600 but spun out with five to go, finishing nineteenth. He finished fifth at the Charlotte Roval to advance to the Round of 12. For the second season in a row, Keselowski was eliminated in the Round of 12 after the Kansas race.

==== 2020: 2nd Championship 4 appearance ====
Prior to the 2020 season, Blaney's crew chief Jeremy Bullins took over as Keselowski's, ending a nine-year partnership with Wolfe that saw them win the 2012 championship and 29 races.

Keselowski started the year by finishing 36th after getting wrecked while leading the Daytona 500. He rebounded next week at Las Vegas, finishing seventh. At Auto Club, he got his first top-five finish of the season by finishing fifth. Keselowski got his first win of the season in the Coca-Cola 600 when he held off Jimmie Johnson in overtime for his maiden 600 victory. The next week at Bristol, while he was running third, leaders Chase Elliott and Logano wrecked, allowing for Keselowski to get his second win of the season. During the summer, although he had fewer wins than other drivers like Kevin Harvick and Denny Hamlin, he ran second in the standings in what he called "silently one of the best seasons of my career."

A third victory came in August at New Hampshire. He signed a contract extension with Team Penske the following day.

In the opening round of the playoffs, Keselowski won at Richmond after leading 192 of 400 laps, including the final 48 after passing Austin Dillon on fresher tires; the victory also came in his New Hampshire car. He relied on points to reach the final round at Phoenix, where he finished second in the championship to Elliott.

==== 2021: Final season at Penske ====
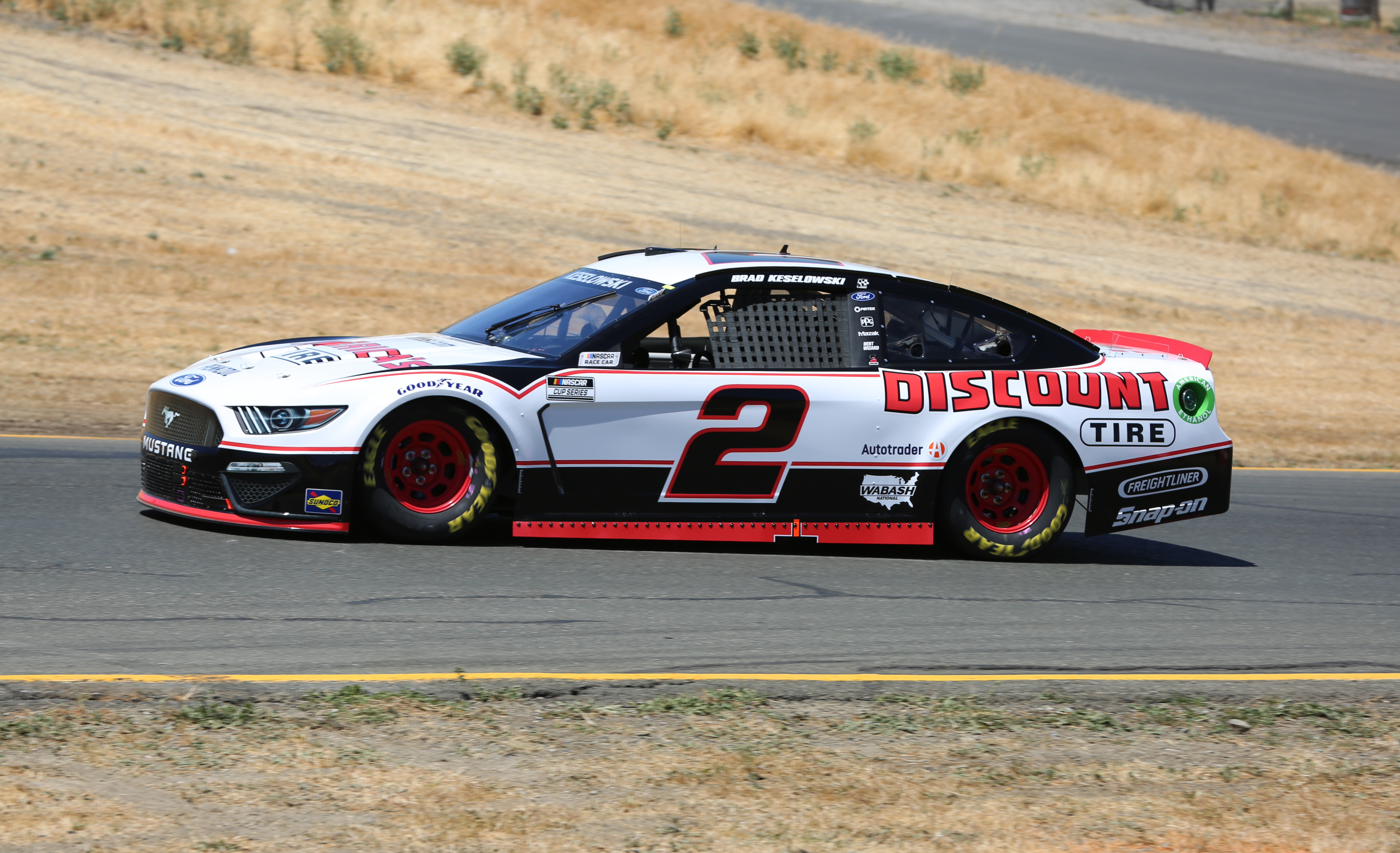
Keselowski racing at Sonoma Raceway in 2021

Keselowski began the 2021 season by being a late contender for the win in the Daytona 500. On the final lap, while receiving drafting help from eventual winner Michael McDowell, Keselowski tried to pass Logano in turn three, but Logano's block and McDowell's push turned him into Logano. Keselowski went into the wall and was hit by Kyle Busch, causing his car to hit the catchfence and burst into flames; he walked away uninjured and ended up thirteenth. Keselowski would win the GEICO 500 after successfully passing Matt DiBenedetto on the final lap. During the playoffs, he made it to the Round of 8 before being eliminated after Martinsville. He finished the season sixth in the points standings.

On July 15, 2021, Penske announced Austin Cindric would take over the No. 2 beginning in 2022. The news aligned with Keselowski's own announcement five days later that he would join Roush Fenway Racing as a minority team owner and driver of the No. 6, replacing Ryan Newman. On November 16, Roush Fenway Racing officially rebranded itself into RFK Racing.

=== 2022–2026: RFK Racing ===
==== 2022 ====
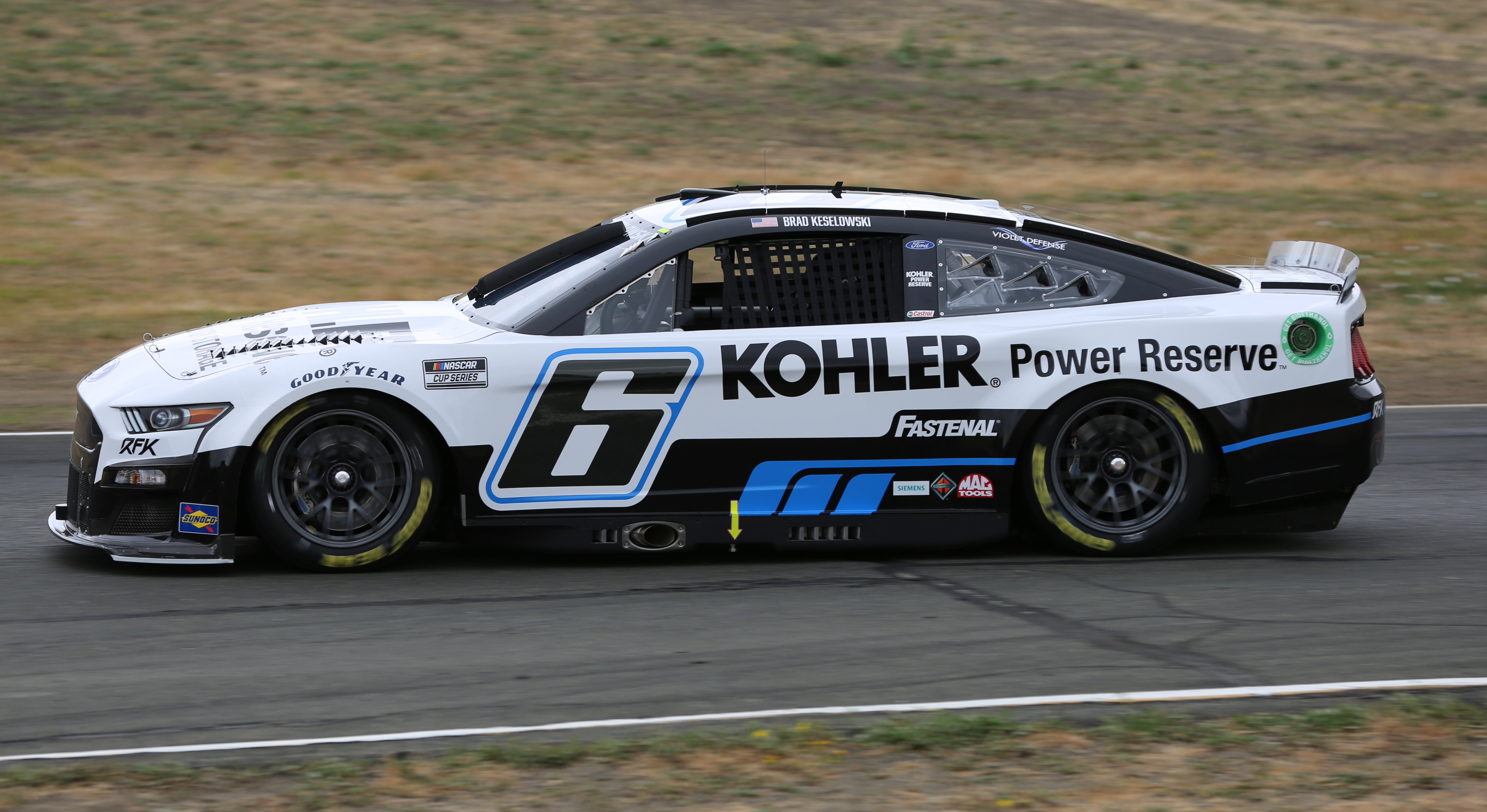
Keselowski during the 2022 Toyota/Save Mart 350

Keselowski began the 2022 season as driver/co-owner of RFK Racing with a ninth-place finish at the 2022 Daytona 500. He then failed to score a top-ten finish at the next fourteen races. On March 24, 2022, crew chief Matt McCall was suspended for four races and fined US$100,000 for an L2 Penalty during post-race inspection after the 2022 Folds of Honor QuikTrip 500 at Atlanta. The penalty came under Sections 14.1 and 14.5 in the NASCAR Rule Book, both of which pertain to the modification of a single source supplied part. In addition, the No. 6 team was docked one-hundred driver and owner points and ten playoff points. Team engineer Josh Sell was announced as Keselowski's crew chief for the 2022 Texas Grand Prix. On April 13, Scott Miller, NASCAR's senior vice president of competition, explained that the repairs to No. 6's rear fascia did not meet original specifications, as a critical dimension of the part was altered. At Sonoma, Keselowski scored his first top-ten finish of the season since Daytona. At New Hampshire, Keselowski and Austin Dillon engaged in an on-road altercation during a caution lap. Due to his mediocre finishes and the lack of a win during the regular season, as well as the penalty imposed on the team, Keselowski missed the playoffs for the first time since 2013. Keselowski led 109 laps at the Bristol night race, but a flat tire while leading ended his chances of victory. Chris Buescher won to give Keselowski his first victory as a car owner in the Cup Series. Keselowski finished fourth at Martinsville, but was disqualified when his car did not meet the minimum weight requirements during post-race inspection. He went winless in points-paying races for the first time since 2010 and finished 24th in the final standings.

==== 2023: Back in the Playoffs ====
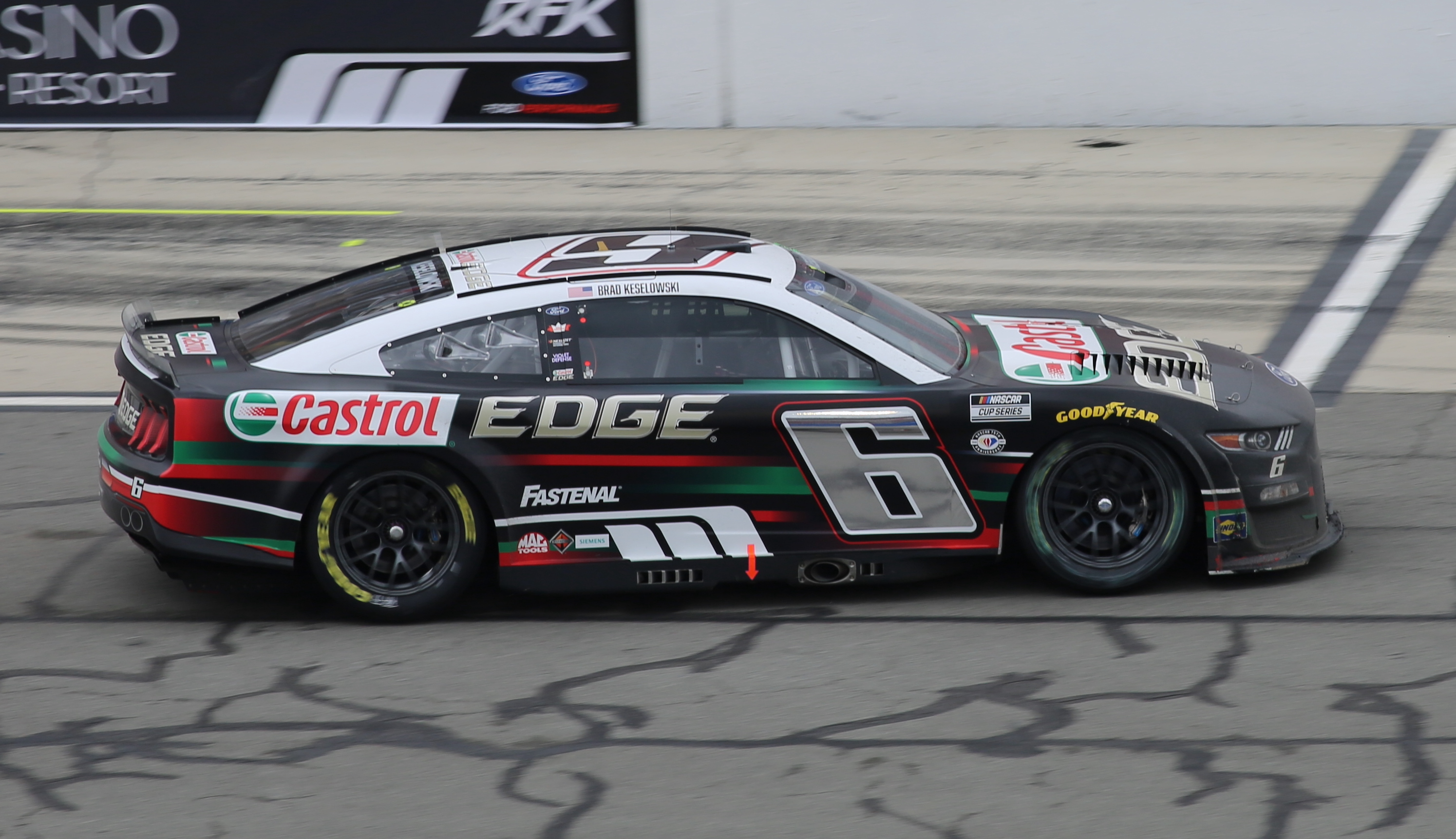
Keselwoski's No. 6 car at Auto Club Speedway in 2023

Keselowski started the 2023 season with a 22nd-place finish at the 2023 Daytona 500. He made his 500th career start at Gateway. Despite not winning a race, Keselowski greatly improved his finishes enough to make it to the playoffs. Keselowski's second-place finish during the final race of the regular season was somewhat overshadowed by an incident during the first red flag period where he drove around in circles repeatedly due to a potential fire under the car. Keselowski was not penalized for the incident. Keselowski was eliminated from the Round of 12 at the conclusion of the Charlotte Roval race. Keselowski finished the season eighth in the points standings, making it the first time the No. 6 finished in the top-ten in the final standings since Mark Martin finished ninth in 2006.

==== 2024: Winless streak snapped ====
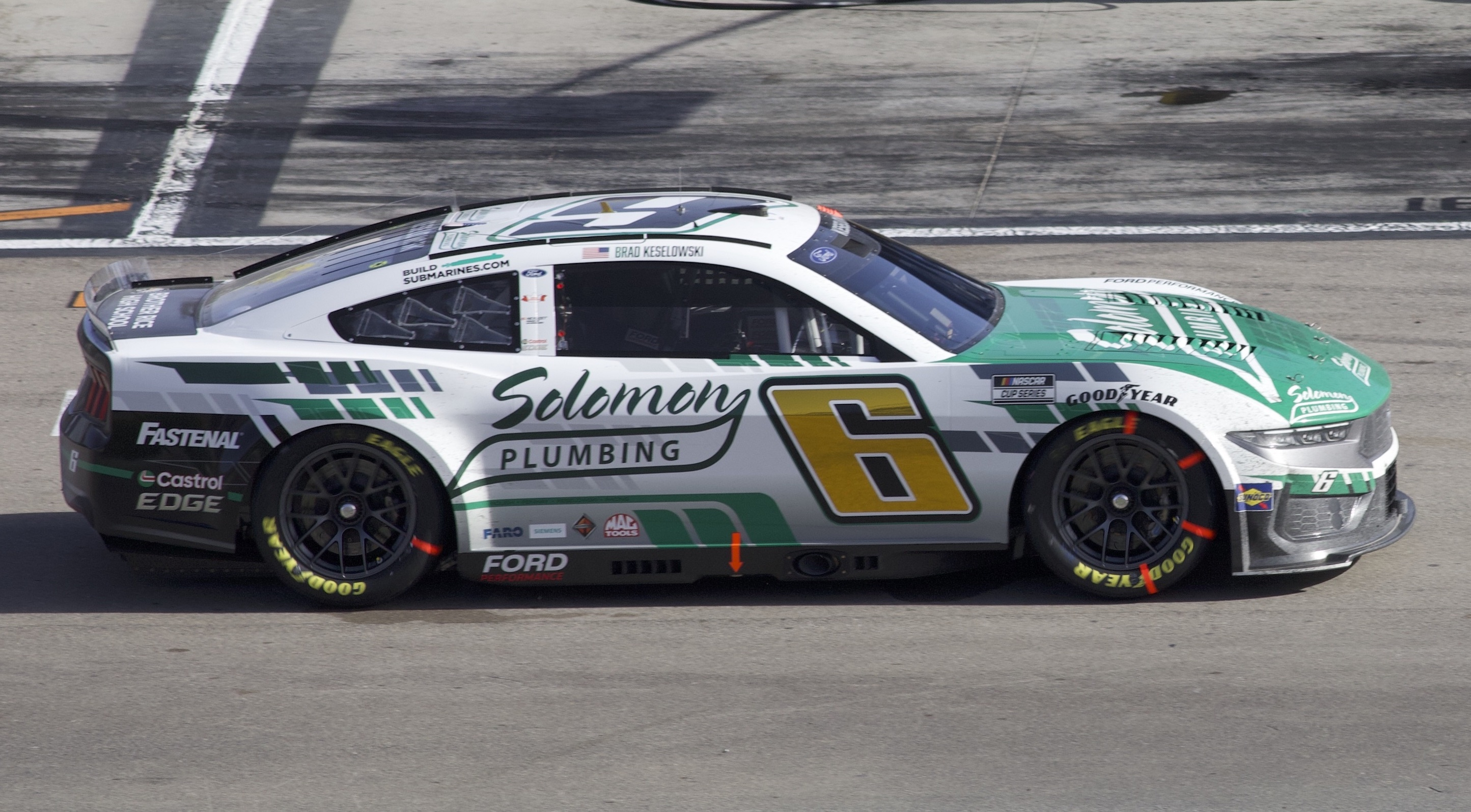
Keselowski's No. 6 car at Las Vegas Motor Speedway in 2024

Keselowski started the 2024 season with a 33rd-place DNF at the 2024 Daytona 500. At Darlington, he took advantage of teammate Chris Buescher and Tyler Reddick colliding in turn 4 with ten laps to go, and held off Ty Gibbs for his first win of 2024, snapping a 110 race winless streak for himself and a 33 race winless streak across all three series for Ford dating back to the 2023 Cup Series Season Finale Keselowski was eliminated from the playoffs at the conclusion of the Round of 16. On November 7, RFK announced that McCall would not return to the No. 6 car in 2025.

==== 2025: Winless ====
Keselowski started the 2025 season with a 26th-place finish at the 2025 Daytona 500. With no wins during the regular season, he failed to make the playoffs and finished the season 20th in the points standings.

==== 2026: Final year with RFK ====
For the 2026 season, Corey LaJoie drove the No. 6 car at the Cook Out Clash, as Keselowski injured his leg in a skiing accident in December 2025. Keselowski returned to the No. 6 at Daytona, where he drove the car to a top-five finish. On September 29, 2026, Keselowski announced he would leave RFK Racing as a owner and driver.

== Business career ==
=== Brad Keselowski Racing ===
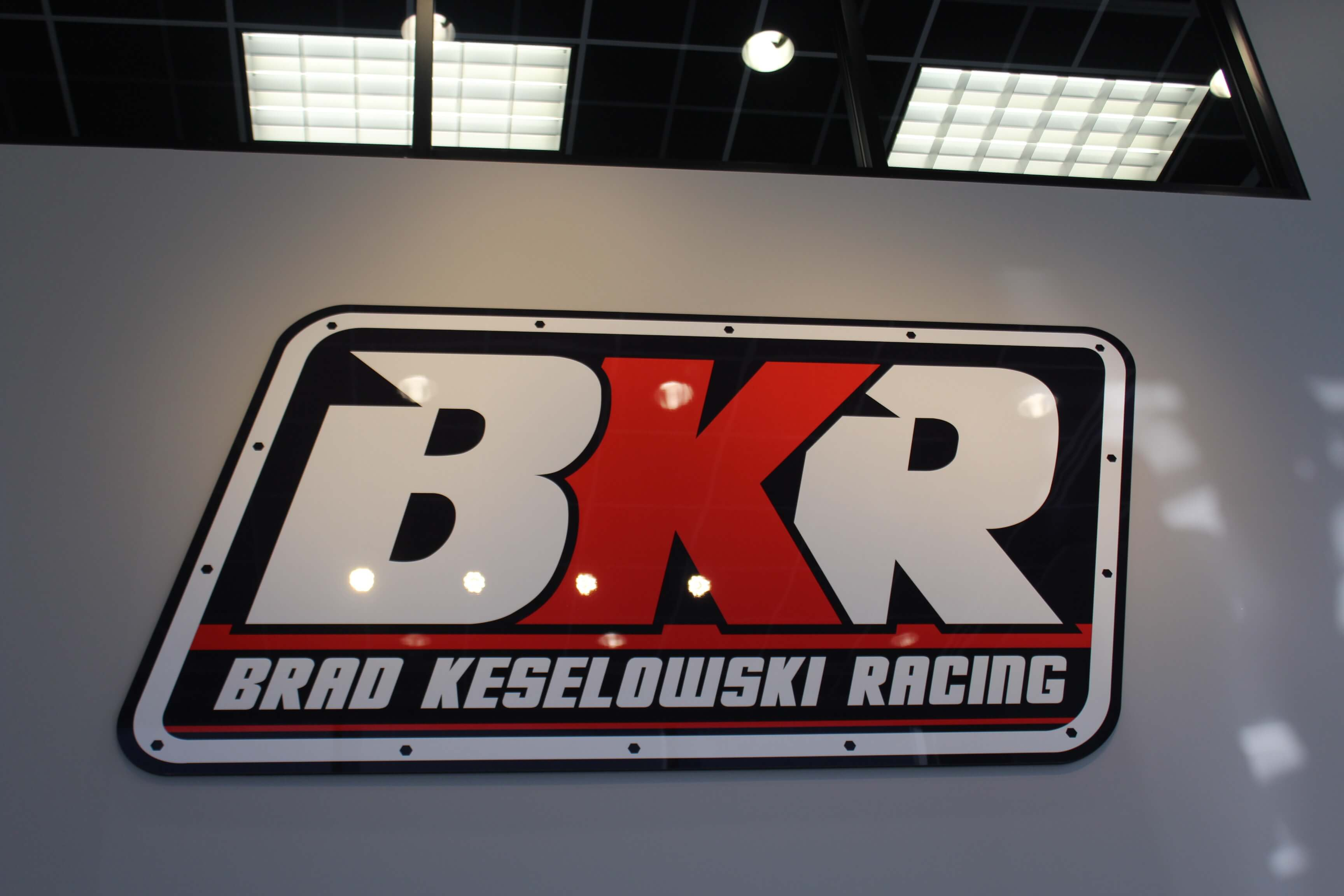
Brad Keselowski Racing's logo. This sign greets visitors as they enter the team's Statesville, NC race shop.

Keselowski formed his race team in 2007. The team began competing in the Truck Series in 2008. Keselowski drove the No. 29 Chevrolet himself and earned the team's first top-ten finish.

In 2011 and part of 2012, Parker Kligerman drove the No. 29 Ram in the Camping World Truck Series for BKR. Kligerman finished eleventh in points in 2011 but was released from BKR midway through the 2012 season, being replaced by Ryan Blaney. Blaney drove the team to its first victory on September 15, 2012, at Iowa Speedway.

In 2013, Keselowski was honored with the National Polish-American Sports Hall of Fame Excellence in Sports Award in Troy, Michigan.

On August 17, 2017, Keselowski announced that BKR would close at the end of the 2017 season, though he remained hopeful to reopen the team in the future and turn it into a Cup Series team. This vision was partly realized when Keselowski purchased an ownership stake in the Cup Series team Roush Fenway Racing, turning it into Roush Fenway Keselowski Racing.

=== Keselowski Advanced Manufacturing ===
Established in early 2018 by Keselowski, Keselowski Advanced Manufacturing (KAM) was founded on the premise of celebrating American manufacturing, with an emphasis on additive manufacturing (also known as metal 3D printing). Specialties also include CNC machining, quality control through scanning capabilities, and engineering design. KAM's vertically integrated company model is aimed at providing end-to-end capabilities for customers from engineering to prototype, to post-processing, to delivery. The company held its official launch on January 24, 2019.

In 2024, KAM announced a merger with the Florida-based manufacturing company ADDMAN. Keselowski remained involved by becoming a commercial advisor on ADDMAN's board of directors.

== Personal life ==
Keselowski is married to Paige White, and the couple has two daughters and two sons.

=== In popular media ===
Keselowski is featured as himself alongside Penske teammate Joey Logano in the movie Sharknado 3: Oh Hell No!.

Keselowski guest-starred in multiple episodes of the TBS sitcom Sullivan & Son.

Keselowski had a cameo as a security guard in the 2017 film Logan Lucky.

== Motorsports career results ==
=== Racing career summary ===
Season	Series	Team	Races	Wins	Top 5	Top 10	Points	Position
2004	ARCA Re/Max Series	Mark Gibson Racing	1	0	0	0	180	121st
2004	ARCA Re/Max Series	Peterson Motorsports	1	0	0	0	180	121st
2004	NASCAR Craftsman Truck Series	K-Automotive Motorsports	8	0	0	0	692	34th
2004	NASCAR Craftsman Truck Series	MB Motorsports	0	0	0	0	692	34th
2005	NASCAR Craftsman Truck Series	K-Automotive Motorsports	25	0	0	1	2367	21st
2006	ARCA Re/Max Series	Conely Racing	1	0	0	0	145	121st
2006	NASCAR Craftsman Truck Series	K-Automotive Motorsports	2	0	0	0	521	40th
2006	NASCAR Craftsman Truck Series	Sutton Motorsports	2	0	0	0	521	40th
2006	NASCAR Craftsman Truck Series	MB Motorsports	2	0	0	0	521	40th
2006	NASCAR Busch Series	Keith Coleman Racing	7	0	0	0	414	72nd
2007	NASCAR Craftsman Truck Series	Pennington Motorsports	2	0	0	0	329	57th
2007	NASCAR Craftsman Truck Series	Germain Racing	1	0	0	0	329	57th
2007	NASCAR Busch Series	Keith Coleman Racing	13	0	0	0	2297	25th
2007	NASCAR Busch Series	JR Motorsports	14	0	0	5	2297	25th
2008	NASCAR Craftsman Truck Series	Brad Keselowski Racing	1	0	0	1	150	73rd
2008	NASCAR Nationwide Series	JR Motorsports	35	2	11	20	4794	**3rd**
2008	NASCAR Sprint Cup Series	Hendrick Motorsports	2	0	0	0	200	57th
2009	NASCAR Camping World Truck Series	Brad Keselowski Racing	1	0	0	0	73	103rd
2009	NASCAR Nationwide Series	JR Motorsports	35	4	22	28	5364	**3rd**
2009	NASCAR Sprint Cup Series	Phoenix Racing	5	1	1	3	1528	38th
2009	NASCAR Sprint Cup Series	Hendrick Motorsports	7	0	0	1	1528	38th
2009	NASCAR Sprint Cup Series	Penske Championship Racing	3	0	0	0	1528	38th
2010	NASCAR Camping World Truck Series	Brad Keselowski Racing	4	0	1	2	504	50th
2010	NASCAR Nationwide Series	Penske Racing	35	6	26	29	5639	**1st**
2010	NASCAR Sprint Cup Series	Penske Racing	36	0	0	2	3485	25th
2011	NASCAR Nationwide Series	Penske Racing	29	5	14	21	0	NC†
2011	NASCAR Sprint Cup Series	Penske Racing	36	3	9	14	2319	5th
2012	NASCAR Camping World Truck Series	Brad Keselowski Racing	6	0	3	4	0	NC†
2012	NASCAR Nationwide Series	Penske Racing	21	3	11	14	0	NC†
2012	NASCAR Sprint Cup Series	Penske Racing	36	5	13	23	2400	**1st**
2013	NASCAR Camping World Truck Series	Brad Keselowski Racing	5	0	2	3	0	NC†
2013	NASCAR Nationwide Series	Penske Racing	16	7	10	10	0	NC†
2013	NASCAR Sprint Cup Series	Penske Racing	36	1	9	16	1041	14th
2014	NASCAR Camping World Truck Series	Brad Keselowski Racing	3	1	3	3	0	NC†
2014	NASCAR Nationwide Series	Team Penske	11	5	10	11	0	NC†
2014	NASCAR Sprint Cup Series	Team Penske	36	6	17	20	2361	5th
2015	NASCAR Camping World Truck Series	Brad Keselowski Racing	4	0	1	1	0	NC†
2015	NASCAR Xfinity Series	Team Penske	9	2	8	9	0	NC†
2015	NASCAR Sprint Cup Series	Team Penske	36	1	9	25	2347	7th
2016	NASCAR Xfinity Series	Team Penske	15	0	5	12	0	NC†
2016	NASCAR Sprint Cup Series	Team Penske	36	4	16	22	2267	12th
2017	NASCAR Xfinity Series	Team Penske	9	2	7	9	0	NC†
2017	Monster Energy NASCAR Cup Series	Team Penske	36	3	15	21	5030	4th
2018	NASCAR Xfinity Series	Team Penske	5	3	4	5	0	NC†
2018	Monster Energy NASCAR Cup Series	Team Penske	36	3	12	20	2343	8th
2019	NASCAR Xfinity Series	Team Penske	2	0	0	0	0	NC†
2019	Monster Energy NASCAR Cup Series	Team Penske	36	3	13	19	2318	8th
2020	NASCAR Xfinity Series	Team Penske	1	0	1	1	0	NC†
2020	NASCAR Cup Series	Team Penske	36	4	13	24	5035	**2nd**
2021	NASCAR Cup Series	Team Penske	36	1	10	17	2354	6th
2022	NASCAR Cup Series	RFK Racing	36	0	1	6	629	24th
2023	SRX Series	N/A	6	0	3	6	167	**3rd**
2023	NASCAR Cup Series	RFK Racing	36	0	7	16	2302	8th
2024	NASCAR Cup Series	RFK Racing	36	1	9	14	2208	13th
2025	NASCAR Cup Series	RFK Racing	36	0	6	13	762	20th
2026	NASCAR Cup Series	RFK Racing					TBD	TBD

=== NASCAR ===
(key) (Bold – Pole position awarded by time. Italics – Pole position earned by points standings. * – Most laps led.)

==== Cup Series ====
NASCAR Cup Series results
Year	Team	No.	Make	1	2	3	4	5	6	7	8	9	10	11	12	13	14	15	16	17	18	19	20	21	22	23	24	25	26	27	28	29	30	31	32	33	34	35	36	NCSC	Pts	Ref
2008	Hendrick Motorsports	25	Chevy	DAY	CAL	LVS	ATL	BRI	MAR	TEX	PHO	TAL	RCH	DAR	CLT	DOV	POC	MCH	SON	NHA	DAY	CHI	IND	POC	GLN	MCH	BRI	CAL	RCH	NHA	DOV	KAN	TAL	CLT; DNQ	MAR	ATL	TEX; 19	PHO	HOM; 23	57th	200	
2009	Phoenix Racing	09	Chevy	DAY; DNQ	CAL							TAL; 1	RCH							NHA; 6	DAY; 24								RCH; 38	NHA	DOV					TAL; 8				38th	1528	
2009	Hendrick Motorsports	25	Chevy			LVS; 38	ATL	BRI	MAR	TEX; 23	PHO			DAR; 7	CLT	DOV; DNQ	POC	MCH	SON			CHI; 32	IND	POC	GLN	MCH; 24	BRI	ATL				KAN; 13	CAL	CLT; 12	MAR					38th	1528	
2009	Penske Championship Racing	12	Dodge																																		TEX; 35	PHO; 37	HOM; 25	38th	1528	
2010	Penske Championship Racing	12	Dodge	DAY; 36	CAL; 21	LVS; 26	ATL; 36	BRI; 13	MAR; 12	PHO; 16	TEX; 14	TAL; 34	RCH; 14	DAR; 12	DOV; 18	CLT; 20	POC; 21	MCH; 27	SON; 35	NHA; 26	DAY; 30	CHI; 18	IND; 19	POC; 20	GLN; 20	MCH; 34	BRI; 19	ATL; 25	RCH; 15	**NHA**; 18	DOV; 22	KAN; 23	CAL; 26	CLT; 27	MAR; 10	TAL; 10	TEX; 33	PHO; 42	HOM; 13	25th	3485	
2011	Penske Racing	2	Dodge	DAY; 29	PHO; 15	LVS; 26	BRI; 18	CAL; 26	MAR; 19	TEX; 18	TAL; 33	RCH; 26	DAR; 3	DOV; 13	**CLT**; 19	KAN; 1	POC; 23	MCH; 25	SON; 10	DAY; 15	KEN; 7	NHA; 35	IND; 9	POC; 1	GLN; 2	MCH; 3	BRI; 1	ATL; 6	RCH; 12	CHI; 6	NHA; 2	DOV; 20	KAN; 3	CLT; 16	TAL; 4	MAR; 17	TEX; 24	PHO; 18	HOM; 20	5th	2319	
2012	Penske Racing	2	Dodge	DAY; 32	PHO; 5	LVS; 32	BRI; 1*	CAL; 18	MAR; 9	TEX; 36	KAN; 11	RCH; 9	TAL; 1	DAR; 15	CLT; 5	DOV; 12	POC; 18	MCH; 13	SON; 12	KEN; 1	DAY; 8	NHA; 5	IND; 9	POC; 4	GLN; 2	MCH; 2	BRI; 30	ATL; 3	RCH; 7	CHI; 1	NHA; 6	DOV; 1	TAL; 7	CLT; 11*	KAN; 8	MAR; 6	TEX; 2	PHO; 6	HOM; 15	1st	2400	
2013	Penske Racing	2	Ford	DAY; 4	PHO; 4	LVS; 3	BRI; 3	CAL; 23	MAR; 6	TEX; 9	KAN; 6	RCH; 33	TAL; 15	DAR; 32	CLT; 35	DOV; 5	POC; 16	MCH; 12	SON; 21	KEN; 33	DAY; 21	**NHA**; 4	IND; 21	POC; 6	GLN; 2	MCH; 12	BRI; 30	ATL; 35	RCH; 17*	CHI; 7	NHA; 11	DOV; 37	KAN; 17	CLT; 1	TAL; 29	MAR; 4	TEX; 6	PHO; 11	HOM; 6	14th	1041	
2014	Team Penske	2	Ford	DAY; 3	**PHO**; 3	LVS; 1*	BRI; 14	CAL; 26	MAR; 38	TEX; 15	DAR; 17	RCH; 4	TAL; 38	KAN; 13	CLT; 10	**DOV**; 2	POC; 2*	MCH; 3	SON; 22	**KEN**; 1*	DAY; 18	NHA; 1*	IND; 12	POC; 23	GLN; 35	MCH; 8	BRI; 2	ATL; 39	**RCH**; 1*	CHI; 1	**NHA**; 7	DOV; 2	KAN; 36	CLT; 16	TAL; 1	MAR; 31	TEX; 3	PHO; 4	HOM; 3	5th	2361	
2015	Team Penske	2	Ford	DAY; 41	ATL; 9	LVS; 7	PHO; 6	CAL; 1	MAR; 2	TEX; 5	BRI; 35	RCH; 17	TAL; 22	KAN; 7	CLT; 7	DOV; 12	POC; 17	MCH; 6	SON; 19	DAY; 29	KEN; 6	NHA; 2*	IND; 10	POC; 2	GLN; 7	MCH; 9	BRI; 6	**DAR**; 2*	RCH; 8	CHI; 8	NHA; 12	DOV; 16	CLT; 9	**KAN**; 9	TAL; 4	MAR; 32	**TEX**; 2*	PHO; 9	HOM; 3*	7th	2347	
2016	Team Penske	2	Ford	DAY; 20	ATL; 9	LVS; 1	PHO; 29	CAL; 9	MAR; 5	TEX; 18	BRI; 18	RCH; 11	TAL; 1*	KAN; 10	DOV; 6	CLT; 5	**POC**; 3	MCH; 4	SON; 15	DAY; 1*	KEN; 1	NHA; 15	IND; 17	POC; 2	GLN; 3*	BRI; 33	MCH; 3	DAR; 9	RCH; 4	CHI; 5	NHA; 4	DOV; 4	CLT; 7	KAN; 38	TAL; 38*	MAR; 2	TEX; 14	PHO; 14	HOM; 35	12th	2267	
2017	Team Penske	2	Ford	DAY; 27	ATL; 1	**LVS**; 5	PHO; 5	CAL; 2	MAR; 1	TEX; 6	BRI; 34	RCH; 2	TAL; 7	KAN; 2	CLT; 39	DOV; 38	POC; 5	MCH; 16	SON; 3	DAY; 31*	KEN; 39	NHA; 9	IND; 2	POC; 5	GLN; 15	**MCH**; 17*	BRI; 29	DAR; 15	RCH; 11	CHI; 6	NHA; 4	DOV; 10	CLT; 15	TAL; 1	KAN; 13	MAR; 4	TEX; 5	PHO; 16	HOM; 7	4th	5030	
2018	Team Penske	2	Ford	DAY; 32	ATL; 2	LVS; 6	PHO; 15	CAL; 4	MAR; 10	TEX; 33	BRI; 23	RCH; 8	TAL; 33	DOV; 6	KAN; 14	CLT; 4	POC; 5	MCH; 6	SON; 13	CHI; 9	DAY; 36	KEN; 3	NHA; 32	POC; 38	GLN; 17	MCH; 2	BRI; 16	DAR; 1	IND; 1	LVS; 1	RCH; 9	ROV; 31	DOV; 14	TAL; 27	KAN; 6	MAR; 5	TEX; 12	PHO; 2	HOM; 5	8th	2343	
2019	Team Penske	2	Ford	DAY; 12	ATL; 1	LVS; 2	PHO; 19	CAL; 3	MAR; 1*	TEX; 36	BRI; 18	RCH; 7	TAL; 13	DOV; 12	KAN; 1	CLT; 19	POC; 2	MCH; 6	SON; 18	CHI; 5	DAY; 39	KEN; 20	**NHA**; 10	POC; 8	GLN; 9	**MCH**; 19*	BRI; 3	DAR; 5	IND; 38	LVS; 3	**RCH**; 4	ROV; 5	DOV; 11	TAL; 25	KAN; 19	MAR; 3	TEX; 39	PHO; 10	HOM; 18	8th	2318	
2020	Team Penske	2	Ford	DAY; 36	LVS; 7	CAL; 5	PHO; 11	DAR; 13	DAR; 4	CLT; 1	CLT; 7	BRI; 1	ATL; 9	MAR; 3	HOM; 10	TAL; 19	POC; 9	POC; 11	IND; 4	KEN; 9	TEX; 9	KAN; 2	NHA; 1*	MCH; 2	MCH; 39	DRC; 13	DOV; 9	DOV; 8	DAY; 10	DAR; 11	RCH; 1*	BRI; 34	LVS; 13	TAL; 18	ROV; 18	KAN; 4	TEX; 6	MAR; 4	PHO; 2	2nd	5035	
2021	Team Penske	2	Ford	DAY; 13	DRC; 5	HOM; 16	LVS; 2	PHO; 4	ATL; 28	BRD; 11	MAR; 33	RCH; 14	TAL; 1	KAN; 3	DAR; 24	DOV; 16	COA; 19	CLT; 11	SON; 15	NSH; 23	POC; 10	POC; 3*	ROA; 13	ATL; 10	NHA; 3	GLN; 35	IRC; 24	MCH; 9	DAY; 33	DAR; 7	RCH; 13	BRI; 6	LVS; 7	TAL; 2	ROV; 20	TEX; 4	KAN; 17	MAR; 3	PHO; 10	6th	2354	
2022	RFK Racing	6	Ford	DAY; 9*	CAL; 27	LVS; 24	PHO; 23	ATL; 12	COA; 14	RCH; 13	MAR; 17	BRD; 11	TAL; 23	DOV; 20	DAR; 34	KAN; 14	CLT; 30	GTW; 20	SON; 10	NSH; 29	ROA; 33	ATL; 18	NHA; 7	POC; 14	IRC; 20	MCH; 15	RCH; 15	GLN; 19	DAY; 35	DAR; 7	KAN; 25	BRI; 13	**TEX**; 8	TAL; 24	ROV; 14	LVS; 17	HOM; 5	MAR; 36	PHO; 35	24th	629	
2023	RFK Racing	6	Ford	DAY; 22*	CAL; 7	LVS; 17	PHO; 18	ATL; 2	COA; 35	RCH; 10	BRD; 17	MAR; 24	TAL; 5	DOV; 8	KAN; 19	DAR; 4	CLT; 19	GTW; 28	SON; 16	NSH; 11	CSC; 24	ATL; 6	NHA; 5	POC; 16	RCH; 6*	MCH; 4	IRC; 20	GLN; 15	DAY; 2	DAR; 6	KAN; 9	BRI; 8	TEX; 7	TAL; 32	ROV; 18	LVS; 4	HOM; 28	MAR; 33	PHO; 15	8th	2302	
2024	RFK Racing	6	Ford	DAY; 33	ATL; 33	LVS; 13	PHO; 4	BRI; 3	COA; 33	RCH; 8	MAR; 24	TEX; 2	TAL; 2	DOV; 30	KAN; 11	DAR; 1	CLT; 2	GTW; 3	SON; 13	IOW; 10	NHA; 28	NSH; 25	CSC; 18	POC; 7	IND; 21	RCH; 16	MCH; 5	DAY; 8	DAR; 14	ATL; 19	GLN; 26	BRI; 26	KAN; 22	TAL; 2	ROV; 23	LVS; 35	HOM; 17	MAR; 9*	PHO; 15	13th	2208	
2025	RFK Racing	6	Ford	DAY; 26	ATL; 39	COA; 15	PHO; 33	LVS; 11	HOM; 26	MAR; 26	DAR; 33	BRI; 16	TAL; 36	TEX; 28	KAN; 37	CLT; 5	NSH; 23	MCH; 10	MXC; 25	POC; 9	ATL; 2	CSC; 37	SON; 11	DOV; 10	IND; 5	IOW; 3	GLN; 31	RCH; 9	DAY; 18	DAR; 15	GTW; 17	BRI; 2	NHA; 23	KAN; 8	ROV; 35	LVS; 10	TAL; 10	MAR; 20	PHO; 2	20th	762	
2026	RFK Racing	6	Ford	DAY; 5	ATL; 17	COA; 20	PHO; 15	LVS; 10	DAR; 2*	MAR; 13	BRI; 14	KAN; 6	TAL; 31	TEX; 13	GLN; 30	CLT; 15	NSH; 34	MCH; 34	POC; 38	COR; 34	SON; 15	CHI; 21	ATL; 26	NWS; 7	IND; 6	IOW; 27	RCH; 26	NHA; 11	DAY; 14	DAR; 23	GTW; 12	BRI; 15	KAN; 12	LVS; 24	CLT; 29	PHO; 16	TAL; 24	MAR; 27	HOM; 28	19th	723	

===== Daytona 500 =====
Year	Team	Manufacturer	Start	Finish
2009	Phoenix Racing	Chevrolet	DNQ	
2010	Penske Championship Racing	Dodge	26	36
2011	Penske Racing	Dodge	16	29
2012	Penske Racing	Dodge	23	32
2013	Penske Racing	Ford	15	4
2014	Team Penske	Ford	33	3
2015	Team Penske	Ford	39	41
2016	Team Penske	Ford	25	20
2017	Team Penske	Ford	7	27
2018	Team Penske	Ford	31	32
2019	Team Penske	Ford	35	12
2020	Team Penske	Ford	9	36
2021	Team Penske	Ford	24	13
2022	RFK Racing	Ford	3	9*
2023	RFK Racing	Ford	10	22*
2024	RFK Racing	Ford	16	33
2025	RFK Racing	Ford	34	26
2026	RFK Racing	Ford	9	5

==== Xfinity Series ====
NASCAR Xfinity Series results
Year	Team	No.	Make	1	2	3	4	5	6	7	8	9	10	11	12	13	14	15	16	17	18	19	20	21	22	23	24	25	26	27	28	29	30	31	32	33	34	35	NXSC	Pts	Ref
2006	Keith Coleman Racing	23	Chevy	DAY	CAL	MXC	LVS	ATL	BRI	TEX	NSH	PHO	TAL	RCH	DAR	CLT	DOV	NSH	KEN	MLW	DAY	CHI	NHA	MAR	GTY	IRP	GLN	MCH	BRI; DNQ	CAL; 37	RCH; 38	DOV	KAN; 26	CLT; 34	MEM; 41	TEX; 29	PHO	HOM; 39	72nd	414	
2007	Keith Coleman Racing	23	Chevy	DAY; DNQ	CAL; 32	MXC; 43	LVS; 34	ATL; 25	BRI; 41	NSH; 38	TEX; 43	PHO; 32	TAL	RCH; 35	DAR; 36	CLT; 37	DOV; 24	NSH; 40	KEN	MLW	NHA	DAY																	25th	2297	
2007	JR Motorsports	88	Chevy																				CHI; 14	GTY; 26	IRP; 10	CGV	GLN	MCH; 13	BRI; 7	CAL; 35	RCH; 38	DOV; 7	KAN; 36	CLT; 11	MEM; 9	TEX; 6	PHO; 21	HOM; 17	25th	2297	
2008	JR Motorsports	88	Chevy	DAY; 16	CAL; 32	LVS; 23	ATL; 6	BRI; 4	NSH; 4	TEX; 15	PHO; 12	MXC; 8	TAL; 23	RCH; 11	DAR; 15	CLT; 3	DOV; 7	NSH; 1	KEN; 4	**MLW**; 8*	NHA; 10	DAY; 5	CHI; 3	GTY; 5	IRP; 19	CGV; 12	GLN; 6	MCH; 11	BRI; 1	CAL; 33	RCH; 21	DOV; 3	KAN; 6	CLT; 8	MEM; 17	TEX; 7	PHO; 21	HOM; 3	3rd	4794	
2009	JR Motorsports	88	Chevy	DAY; 22	CAL; 27	LVS; 27	BRI; 12	TEX; 3	NSH; 3	PHO; 3	TAL; 9	RCH; 4	DAR; 11	CLT; 8	DOV; 1	NSH; 2	KEN; 3	MLW; 3	NHA; 3	DAY; 6	CHI; 18	**GTY**; 8	IRP; 4	IOW; 1*	GLN; 9	MCH; 1	**BRI**; 3	CGV; 5	ATL; 4	RCH; 4	DOV; 3	KAN; 3	CAL; 5	CLT; 6	MEM; 1	TEX; 5	PHO; 5	HOM; 12	3rd	5364	
2010	Penske Racing	22	Dodge	DAY; 13	CAL; 3	**LVS**; 4	**BRI**; 2*	NSH; 5	PHO; 3	TEX; 4	TAL; 1	RCH; 1*	DAR; 7	DOV; 7	CLT; 2*	NSH; 1*	KEN; 3	ROA; 4	**NHA**; 2	**DAY**; 4	CHI; 21	GTY; 14*	IRP; 8	IOW; 4	GLN; 4	**MCH**; 1*	BRI; 14	CGV; 4	ATL; 12	RCH; 2	DOV; 17	KAN; 2	CAL; 2	CLT; 1	GTY; 1	TEX; 3	PHO; 4	HOM; 3	1st	5639	
2011	Penske Racing	22	Dodge	DAY; 30	PHO; 34	LVS; 3	BRI; 9	CAL; 10	TEX; 2	TAL; 4	NSH; 3	RCH; 5	DAR; 27	DOV; 12	IOW; 3	CLT; 6	CHI; 30	MCH; 9	ROA	DAY; 17	KEN; 1*	**NHA**; 8	**NSH**; 12	IRP; 1	IOW	GLN	CGV	BRI	ATL; 7	**RCH**; 19	CHI; 1*	DOV; 2	KAN; 1*	CLT; 6*	TEX; 5	PHO; 5	**HOM**; 1		91st	0^{1}	
2012	Penske Racing	22	Dodge	DAY; 2	PHO; 2	LVS; 23	BRI; 3	CAL; 3	TEX; 35	RCH; 16	TAL; 20	DAR; 3	IOW	CLT; 1	DOV	MCH; 10	ROA	KEN; 7	DAY; 35	**NHA**; 1*	CHI	IND; 1	IOW	GLN; 2*	CGV	BRI; 32	ATL; 2	RCH	CHI; 4	KEN	DOV	CLT; 18	KAN	CLT	TEX	PHO; 9	HOM		118th	0^{1}	
2013	Penske Racing	22	Ford	DAY; 12	PHO; 2	LVS; 37	BRI; 15	CAL; 19	TEX; 2	**RCH**; 1	TAL	DAR	CLT	DOV	IOW	MCH	ROA	KEN; 1	DAY	NHA	CHI	IND	IOW; 1	GLN; 1	MOH	BRI; 2	ATL	RCH; 1	CHI	KEN	DOV	KAN; 28	CLT	TEX; 1*	PHO; 19				90th	0^{1}	
2013	Penske Racing	48	Ford																																	HOM; 1			90th	0^{1}	
2014	Team Penske	22	Ford	DAY; 2	**PHO**; 3	LVS; 1*	BRI	CAL	TEX	DAR	RCH	TAL	IOW	CLT; 2	DOV	MCH	ROA	**KEN**; 2*	DAY	**NHA**; 1*	CHI	IND	IOW; 1*	**GLN**; 4	MOH	BRI	ATL	RCH	CHI	KEN	DOV	KAN	CLT; 1	TEX	PHO; 1	**HOM**; 8			78th	0^{1}	
2015	Team Penske	22	Ford	DAY; 5	ATL	LVS	PHO	CAL; 8	TEX; 2	BRI	RCH	TAL	IOW	CLT	DOV	MCH	CHI	DAY	KEN; 1	NHA; 3	IND	IOW	GLN; 2*	MOH	BRI	ROA	DAR	RCH	CHI	KEN	DOV	CLT; 3	KAN	TEX; 1*	PHO; 2	HOM			84th	0^{1}	
2016	Team Penske	22	Ford	DAY	ATL; 6	LVS; 15	PHO; 9	CAL	TEX; 3	BRI	RCH; 9	TAL	DOV	CLT	POC	MCH	IOW; 3	DAY	KEN; 10	NHA; 3	IND	IOW; 8	GLN; 24	MOH	BRI; 12	ROA	DAR	RCH; 3	CHI	KEN	DOV	CLT; 9	KAN	**TEX**; 2*	PHO; 9	HOM			94th	0^{1}	
2017	Team Penske	22	Ford	DAY; 4	ATL; 2	LVS; 10	PHO	CAL	TEX	BRI	RCH	TAL	CLT; 6	DOV	POC; 1*	MCH; 4*	IOW	DAY	KEN	NHA; 5*	IND	IOW	GLN; 3	MOH	BRI	ROA	DAR	RCH; 1	CHI	KEN	DOV	CLT	KAN	TEX	PHO	HOM			90th	0^{1}	
2018	Team Penske	22	Ford	DAY	ATL	LVS	PHO; 1	CAL	TEX	BRI	RCH	TAL	DOV	**CLT**; 1	POC	MCH	IOW	CHI	DAY	KEN	**NHA**; 2	IOW					DAR; 1	IND	LVS	RCH	ROV	DOV	KAN	TEX	PHO	HOM			84th	0^{1}	
2018	Team Penske	12	Ford																				GLN; 10	MOH	BRI	ROA													84th	0^{1}	
2019	Team Penske	12	Ford	DAY; 37	ATL	LVS	PHO	CAL	TEX; 36	BRI	RCH	TAL	DOV	CLT	POC	MCH	IOW	CHI	DAY	KEN	NHA	IOW	GLN	MOH	BRI	ROA	DAR	IND	LVS	RCH	ROV	DOV	KAN	TEX	PHO	HOM			105th	0^{1}	
2020	Team Penske	12	Ford	DAY	LVS	CAL	PHO; 4	DAR	CLT	BRI	ATL	HOM	HOM	TAL	POC	IRC	KEN	KEN	TEX	KAN	ROA	DRC	DOV	DOV	DAY	DAR	RCH	RCH	BRI	LVS	TAL	ROV	KAN	TEX	MAR	PHO			76th	0^{1}	

==== Camping World Truck Series ====
NASCAR Camping World Truck Series results
Year	Team	No.	Make	1	2	3	4	5	6	7	8	9	10	11	12	13	14	15	16	17	18	19	20	21	22	23	24	25	NCWTC	Pts	Ref
2004	K-Automotive Motorsports	29	Ford	DAY	ATL	MAR; 33	MFD; 16	CLT	DOV; 30	TEX; 25	MEM; 35	MLW; 18	KAN; 27	KEN	GTW; 20	MCH	IRP	NSH	BRI	RCH	NHA	LVS	CAL	TEX	MAR	PHO	DAR		34th	692	
2004	MB Motorsports	63	Ford																									HOM; DNQ	34th	692	
2005	K-Automotive Motorsports	29	Ford	DAY; 7	CAL; 31	ATL; 22	MAR; 35	GTY; 15	MFD; 13	CLT; 24	DOV; 15	TEX; 20	MCH; 35	MLW; 27	KAN; 21	KEN; 18	MEM; 14	IRP; 34	NSH; 30	BRI; 18	RCH; 16	NHA; 21	LVS; 34	MAR; 18	ATL; 30	TEX; 31	PHO; 27	HOM; 22	21st	2367	
2006	K-Automotive Motorsports	29	Ford	DAY; 34	CAL; 16	ATL	MAR	GTY	CLT	MFD	DOV	TEX	MCH	MLW	KAN														40th	521	
2006	Sutton Motorsports	02	Chevy													KEN; 30	MEM; 16	IRP	NSH										40th	521	
2006	MB Motorsports	63	Ford																	BRI; 34	NHA	LVS	TAL	MAR	ATL	TEX	PHO	HOM; 24	40th	521	
2007	Pennington Motorsports	7	Chevy	DAY	CAL	ATL; 19	MAR; 20	KAN	CLT	MFD	DOV	TEX	MCH	MLW															57th	329	
2007	Germain Racing	9	Toyota												**MEM**; 16	KEN	IRP	NSH	BRI	GTW	NHA	LVS	TAL	MAR	ATL	TEX	PHO	HOM	57th	329	
2008	Brad Keselowski Racing	19	Chevy	DAY	CAL	ATL	MAR	KAN	CLT	MFD	DOV	TEX	MCH	MLW	MEM	KEN	IRP	NSH	BRI	GTW	NHA	LVS	TAL	MAR	ATL	TEX	PHO; 6	HOM	73rd	150	
2009	Brad Keselowski Racing	29	Chevy	DAY	CAL	ATL	MAR	KAN	CLT	DOV	TEX	MCH	MLW	MEM	KEN	IRP	NSH	BRI; 30	CHI	IOW	GTW	NHA	LVS	MAR	TAL	TEX	PHO	HOM	103rd	73	
2010	Brad Keselowski Racing	29	Ram	DAY	ATL	MAR	NSH; 18	KAN	DOV	CLT; 28	TEX	MCH	IOW	GTY; 2	IRP	POC	NSH	DAR	BRI; 7	CHI	KEN	NHA	LVS	MAR	TAL	TEX	PHO	HOM	50th	504	
2012	Brad Keselowski Racing	19	Ram	DAY; 27	MAR	CAR	KAN; 3	CLT; 2	DOV	TEX	KEN; 2	IOW	CHI	POC															81st	0^{1}	
2012	Brad Keselowski Racing	29	Ram												MCH; 8	BRI; 25	ATL	IOW	KEN	LVS	TAL	MAR	TEX	PHO	HOM				81st	0^{1}	
2013	Brad Keselowski Racing	2	Ford	DAY	MAR	CAR	KAN	CLT; 14	DOV	TEX																			87th	0^{1}	
2013	Brad Keselowski Racing	19	Ford								KEN; 2	IOW	ELD	POC	MCH	BRI; 9	MSP	IOW	CHI; 2	LVS	TAL	MAR	TEX; 21	PHO	HOM				87th	0^{1}	
2014	Brad Keselowski Racing	19	Ford	DAY	MAR	KAN	CLT; 3	DOV	TEX	GTW	KEN; 5	IOW	ELD	POC	MCH	BRI; 1*	MSP	CHI	NHA	LVS	TAL	MAR	TEX	PHO	HOM				90th	0^{1}	
2015	Brad Keselowski Racing	29	Ford	DAY	ATL; 15	MAR	KAN	CLT; 5	DOV	TEX	GTW	IOW	KEN	ELD; 28	POC; 30	MCH	BRI	MSP	CHI	NHA	LVS	TAL	MAR	TEX	PHO	HOM			90th	0^{1}	

^{*} Season still in progress
^{1} Ineligible for series points

=== ARCA Re/Max Series ===
(key) (Bold – Pole position awarded by qualifying time. Italics – Pole position earned by points standings or practice time. * – Most laps led.)

ARCA Re/Max Series results
Year	Team	No.	Make	1	2	3	4	5	6	7	8	9	10	11	12	13	14	15	16	17	18	19	20	21	22	23	ARSC	Pts	Ref
2004	Mark Gibson Racing	56	Chevy	DAY	NSH	SLM	KEN; 32	TOL																			121st	180	
2004	Peterson Motorsports	6	Chevy						CLT; 24	KAN	POC	MCH	SBO	BLN	KEN	GTW	POC	LER	NSH	ISF	TOL	DSF	CHI	SLM	TAL		121st	180	
2006	Conely Racing	97	Chevy	DAY	NSH	SLM	WIN	KEN	TOL	POC	MCH; 17	KAN	KEN	BLN	POC	GTW	NSH	MCH	ISF	MIL	TOL	DSF	CHI	SLM	TAL	IOW	121st	145	

=== Superstar Racing Experience ===
(key) * – Most laps led. ^{1} – Heat 1 winner. ^{2} – Heat 2 winner.

Superstar Racing Experience results
Year	No.	1	2	3	4	5	6	SRXC	Pts
2023	6	STA; 9	STA II; 10^{2}	MMS; 4	BER; 2^{1}	ELD; 9	LOS; 2	3rd	167

=== CARS Late Model Stock Car Tour ===
(key) (Bold – Pole position awarded by qualifying time. Italics – Pole position earned by points standings or practice time. * – Most laps led. ** – All laps led.)

CARS Late Model Stock Car Tour results
Year	Team	No.	Make	1	2	3	4	5	6	7	8	9	10	11	12	13	14	15	16	CLMSCTC	Pts	Ref
2023	N/A	6K	Ford	SNM	FLC	HCY	ACE	NWS; 12	LGY	DOM	CRW	HCY	ACE	TCM	WKS	AAS	SBO	TCM	CRW	56th	21	

== See also ==
- List of all-time NASCAR Cup Series winners
- List of Michigan sports figures
- List of NASCAR O'Reilly Auto Parts Series champions
- List of NASCAR All-Star Race drivers
- List of NASCAR Cup Series champions

Sporting positions
Preceded by Tony Stewart	NASCAR Cup Series Champion; 2012	Succeeded by Jimmie Johnson
Preceded by Kyle Busch	NASCAR Xfinity Series Champion; 2010	Succeeded by Ricky Stenhouse Jr.
Awards
Preceded by Carl Edwards	NASCAR Nationwide Series Most Popular Driver; 2008–2010	Succeeded by Elliott Sadler
Awards and achievements
Preceded by Kasey Kahne	Brickyard 400 winner 2018	Succeeded by Kevin Harvick
Preceded by Denny Hamlin	Southern 500 winner 2018	Succeeded by Erik Jones
Preceded by Martin Truex Jr.	Coca-Cola 600 winner 2020	Succeeded by Kyle Larson
