= David Starr (racing driver) =

American racing driver (born 1967)

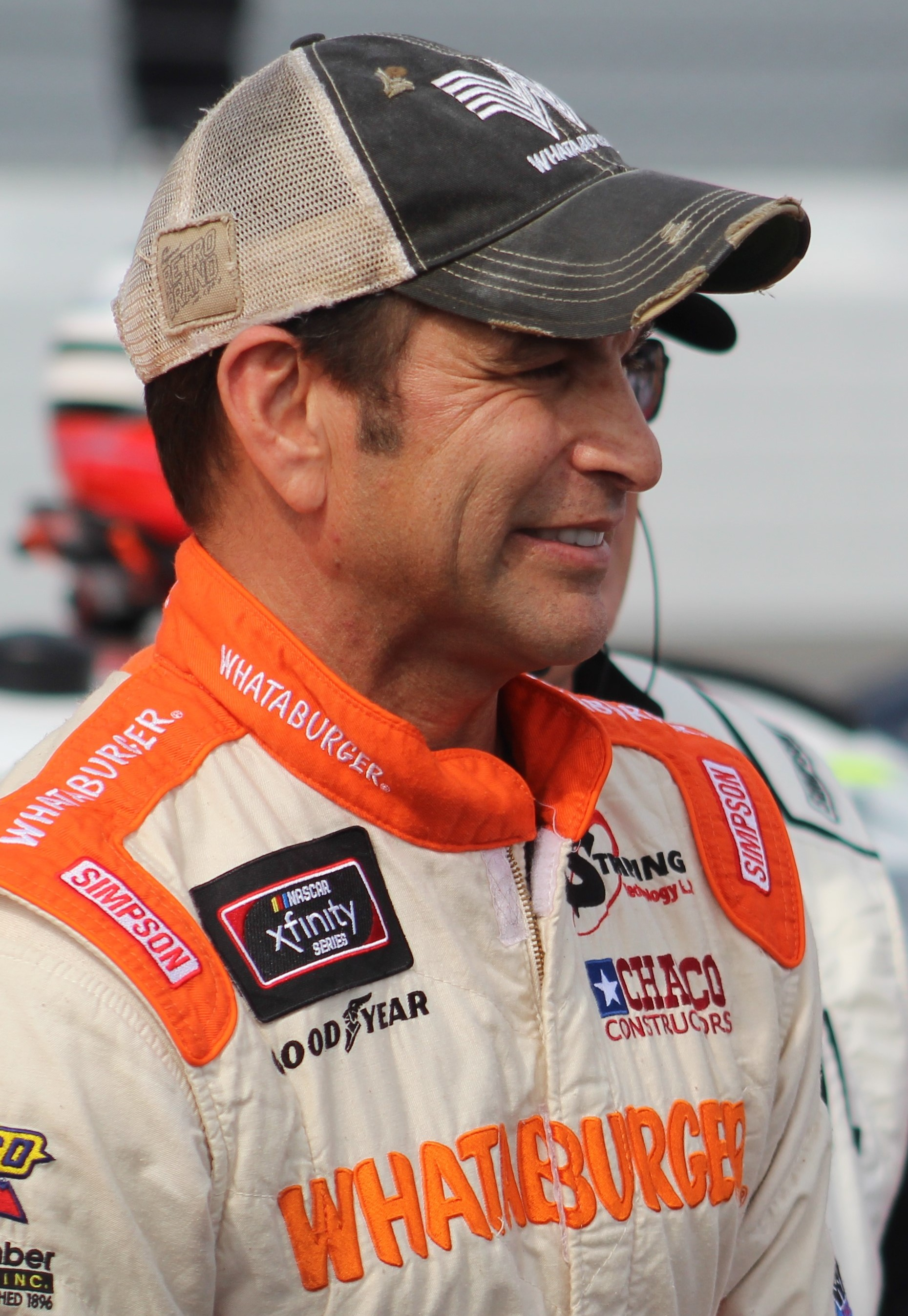
- Starr at Daytona International Speedway in 2019
- Born: David Leon Starr; October 11, 1967 (age 59); Houston, Texas, U.S.
- Awards: 2002 NASCAR Craftsman Truck Series Most Popular Driver

NASCAR Cup Series career
- 19 races run over 7 years
- 2025 position: 56th
- Best finish: 51st (2020)
- First race: 2011 Samsung Mobile 500 (Texas)
- Last race: 2025 Quaker State 400 (Atlanta)
Wins	Top tens	Poles
0	0	0

NASCAR O'Reilly Auto Parts Series career
- 277 races run over 21 years
- 2026 position: 48th
- Best finish: 16th (2015)
- First race: 2000 Touchstone Energy 300 (Talladega)
- Last race: 2026 Food City 300 (Bristol)
Wins	Top tens	Poles
0	4	0

NASCAR FedEx Freight Truck Series career
- 317 races run over 16 years
- 2013 position: 24th
- Best finish: 4th (2006)
- First race: 1998 Chevy Trucks 150 (Phoenix)
- Last race: 2013 Lucas Oil 150 (Phoenix)
- First win: 2002 Las Vegas 350 (Las Vegas)
- Last win: 2006 Kroger 250 (Martinsville)
Wins	Top tens	Poles
4	117	5
- Statistics up to date as of November 7, 2026.

David Leon Starr (born October 11, 1967) is an American professional stock car racing driver. He last competed part-time in the NASCAR O'Reilly Auto Parts Series, driving the No. 53/55 Chevrolet Camaro SS for Joey Gase Motorsports with Scott Osteen, the No. 42 Chevrolet Camaro SS for Young's Motorsports, and the No. 47 Chevrolet Camaro SS for Mike Harmon Racing with Team Stange Racing. He has also previously competed in the NASCAR Craftsman Truck Series, where he is a four-time race winner, as well as NASCAR Cup Series, and what are now the ARCA Menards Series and ARCA Menards Series West.

== Racing career ==
=== Early career ===
Starr began by being on a neighbor's pit crew at the age of fourteen. At the age of sixteen, he started driving in street stock racing, winning the championship at Big H Motor Speedway in his first year racing. Over the next seven years, Starr won a total of twenty late model races. In 1993, he began driving at the Team Texas driving school and eventually becoming a race instructor. During this time, he worked for Donnie Allison as a crew member on his Busch Series team. He joined the Texas International Driving Association in 1996 and became the first rookie to win a race.

=== NASCAR ===
In 1998, Starr made his Truck Series debut driving the No. 9 Chevrolet Silverado for Reher-Morrison Racing in five races. His best finish was eighteenth at his home track at Texas Motor Speedway. The following season, he competed in the Truck Series full-time. Driving primarily for Tagsby Racing, he also competed for Team 23 Racing, Conely Racing, Morgan-Dollar Motorsports, and McGlynn Racing, and was able to finish 22nd in the standings. Sagby closed its doors at the end of the season, leaving Starr without a full-time ride. He drove most of his races for Conely part-time, as well as for Ware Racing Enterprises and TKO Motorsports, his best finish twelfth at Texas, where he also qualified on the outside pole. That season, he made his Busch Series debut at Talladega for Day Enterprise Racing, finishing 42nd. After running one race for TKO at Daytona International Speedway, he ran four races for Team Menard, finishing no lower than seventh.

Starr earned his second full-time ride in 2002, when he joined the No. 75 Spears Motorsports team. He won his first race at Las Vegas and was named the Series' Most Popular Driver after a fifth-place finish. He was tenth in the standings in 2003 when he suffered injuries and was forced to miss four races. He was still able to post thirteen top-tens that season. Starr also attempted to make his Winston Cup Series debut at Texas Motor Speedway, but failed to qualify.

Starr won two races in 2004 and moved up to sixth in points. After a winless 2005, Starr left Spears and was rumored to drive the new Hall of Fame Racing NEXTEL Cup ride, but instead signed with the No. 11 team fielded by Red Horse Racing. He won his most recent race at Martinsville Speedway and had a career-best fourth-place points finish. It was reported that he was replaced at Red Horse by Aaron Fike, but team owner Jeff Hammond has stated that Starr was still under contract with the team and would continue to drive for them if they find sponsorship. He joined Circle Bar Racing for 2007, and drove the No. 10 MaxxForce Diesel Ford with equipment purchased from ppc Racing to a tenth-place points finish with five top-tens.

Starr rejoined Red Horse in 2008 and had eight top-tens. In 2009, Starr joined HT Motorsports in the No. 24 Zachry Toyota Camry Starr attempted to make his Sprint Cup debut for BlackJack Racing at Fontana in 2009, but did not qualify, and had fourteen top-ten finishes, his highest total since 2004.

For 2010, Starr moved to Randy Moss Motorsports as HT Motorsports closed its doors. Starr had seven top-ten's and was in the top-ten in points entering the EnjoyIllinois.com 225 at Chicagoland when the team suspended operations due to financial difficulties. Starr picked up a last-minute ride with SS-Green Light Racing in their No. 21 Chevrolet, which was intended to start and park at Chicagoland. However, Starr ran the full race and scored a top-ten finish. Starr eventually took the No. 81 as well as the Zachry sponsorship with him to SS-Green Light and drove for the team the remainder of the season, scoring a ninth-place points finish. Starr returned to the team for the 2011 season, finishing thirteenth in points. He also competed in a limited number of races in the Sprint Cup Series for Leavine Family Racing in the No. 95. In his four starts out of eight attempts, his best finish of 27th was at Bristol Motor Speedway.

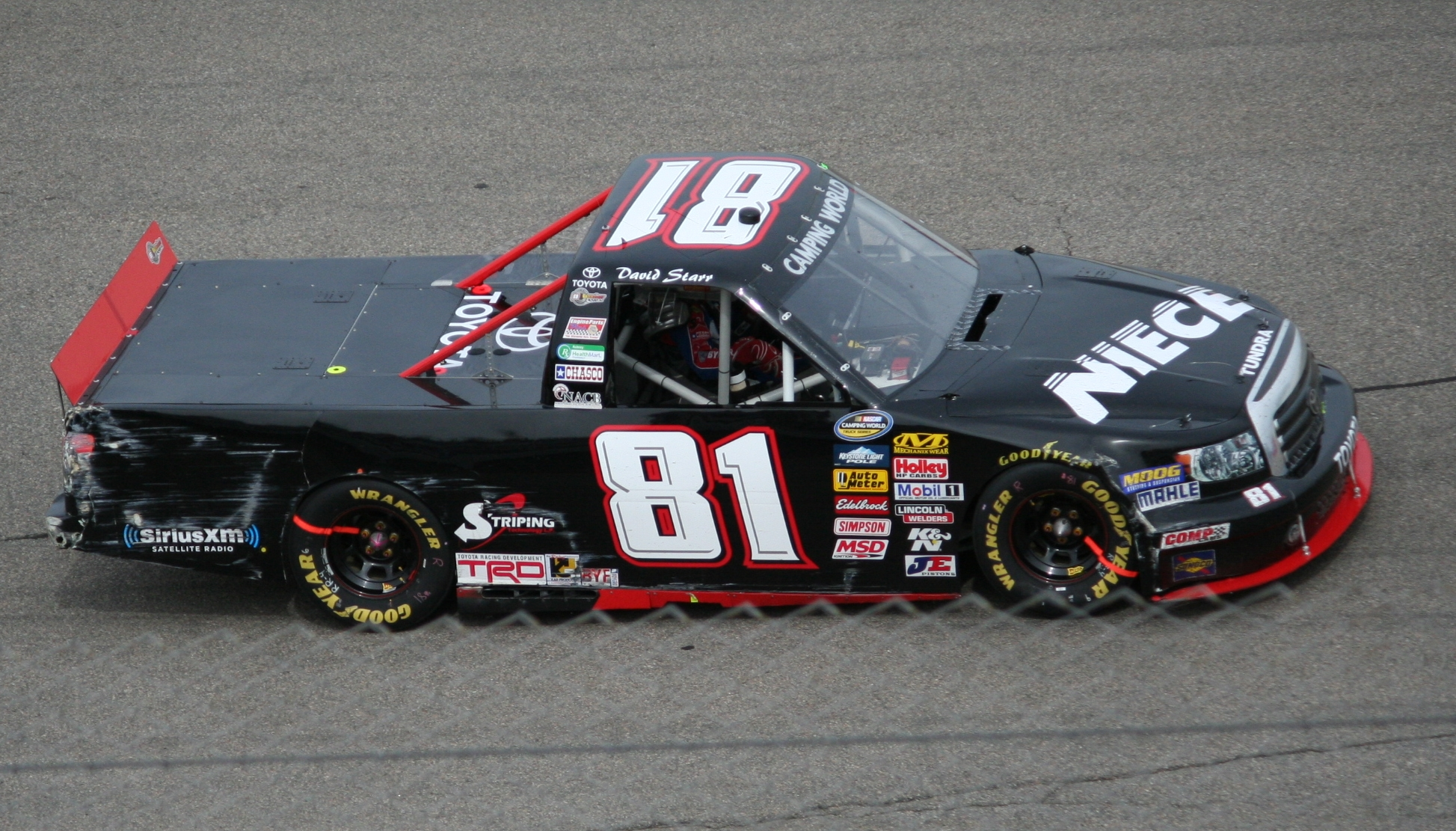
Starr in the No. 81 for SS-Green Light Racing at Rockingham in 2013

For 2012, Starr moved to newly formed Arrington Racing, bringing his sponsor and truck number, the No. 81, with him for the full season. However he was forced to miss races after the midpoint of the season due to a lack of sponsorship.

In 2013 Starr returned to SS-Green Light Racing to attempt the full season, but again had his season truncated due to a lack of sponsorship.

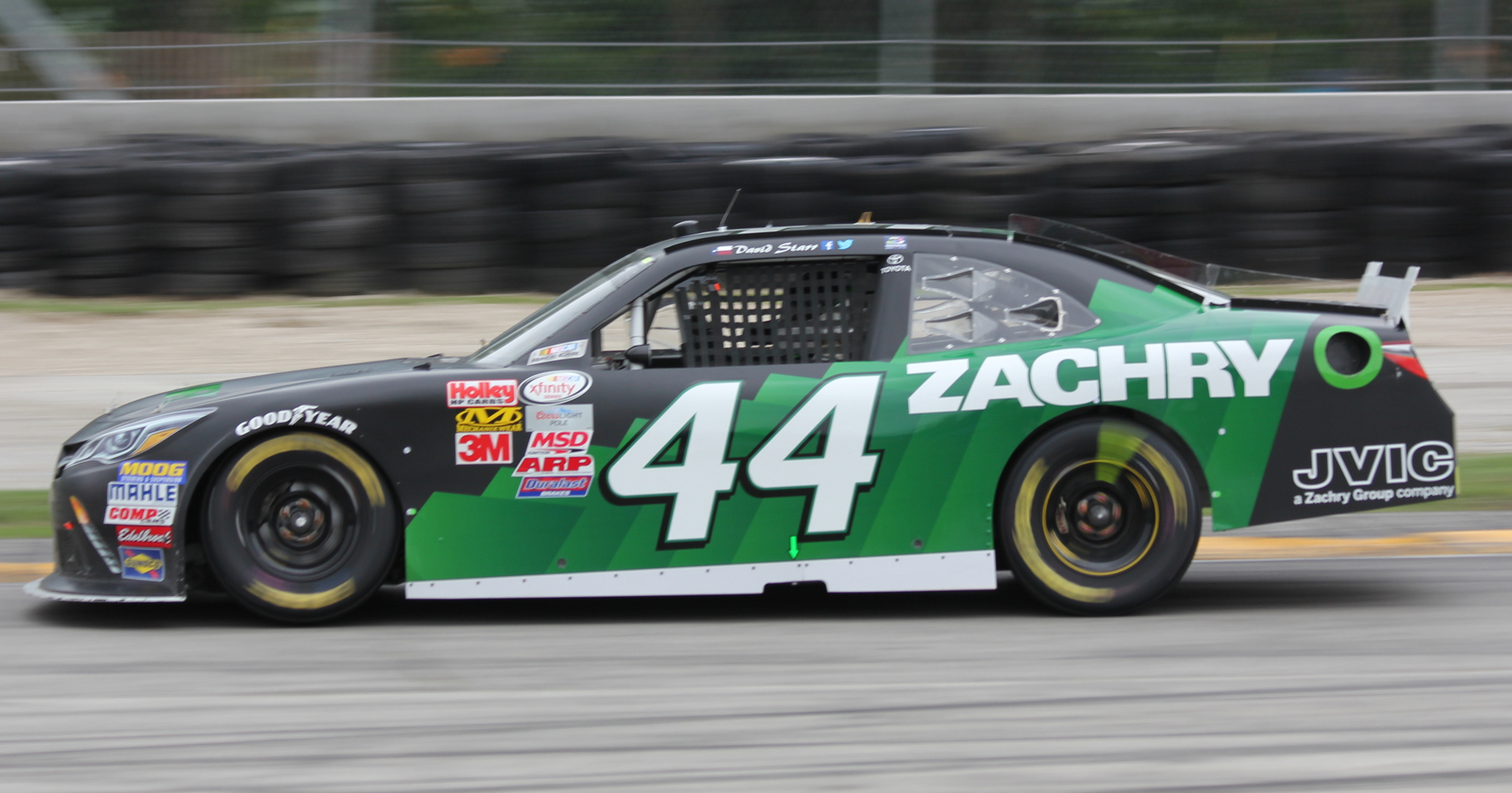
Starr in the No. 44 for TriStar Motorsports at Road America in 2015

For the 2014 season, Starr joined TriStar Motorsports, driving in the NASCAR Nationwide Series in a partial schedule, before switching to a full-time schedule with the team in 2015.

In 2015, Starr took over the No. 44 Zachry Toyota full-time. Starr finished a career best finish sixth in the season opener at Daytona. Before the Richmond race, Starr was sick and could not race, being replaced by J. J. Yeley. With Yeley finishing thirteenth at Richmond, he eventually replaced Starr full-time in the No. 44.

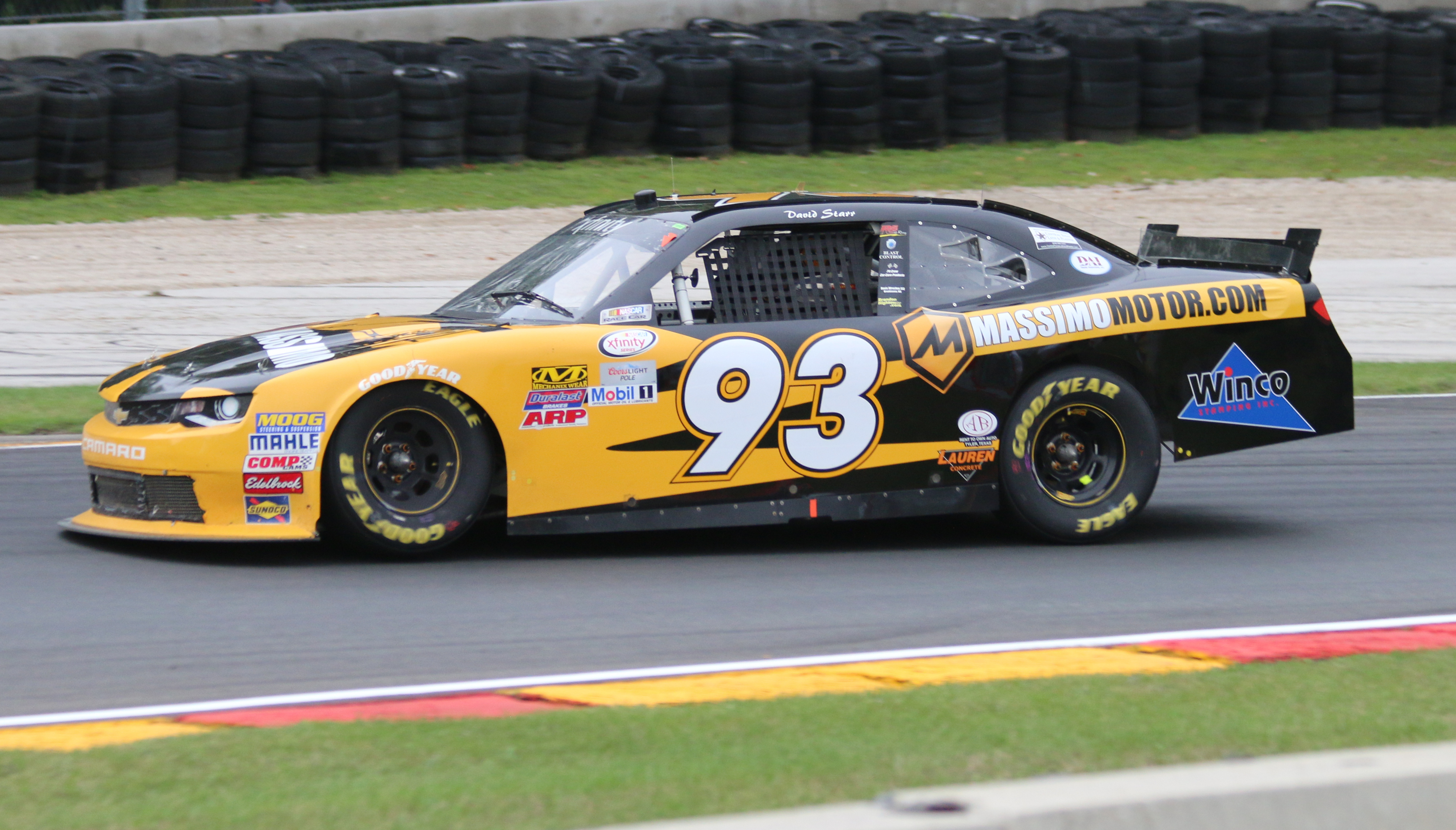
Starr in the No. 93 for RSS Racing at Road America in 2016

On June 24, 2016, after his release from the No. 44 it was announced that Starr joined RSS Racing to drive the No. 93 Massimo Motors Chevrolet Camaro for the remainder of the 2016 season. Starr finished 27th in his debut with RSS Racing at Daytona, after being involved in a late crash.

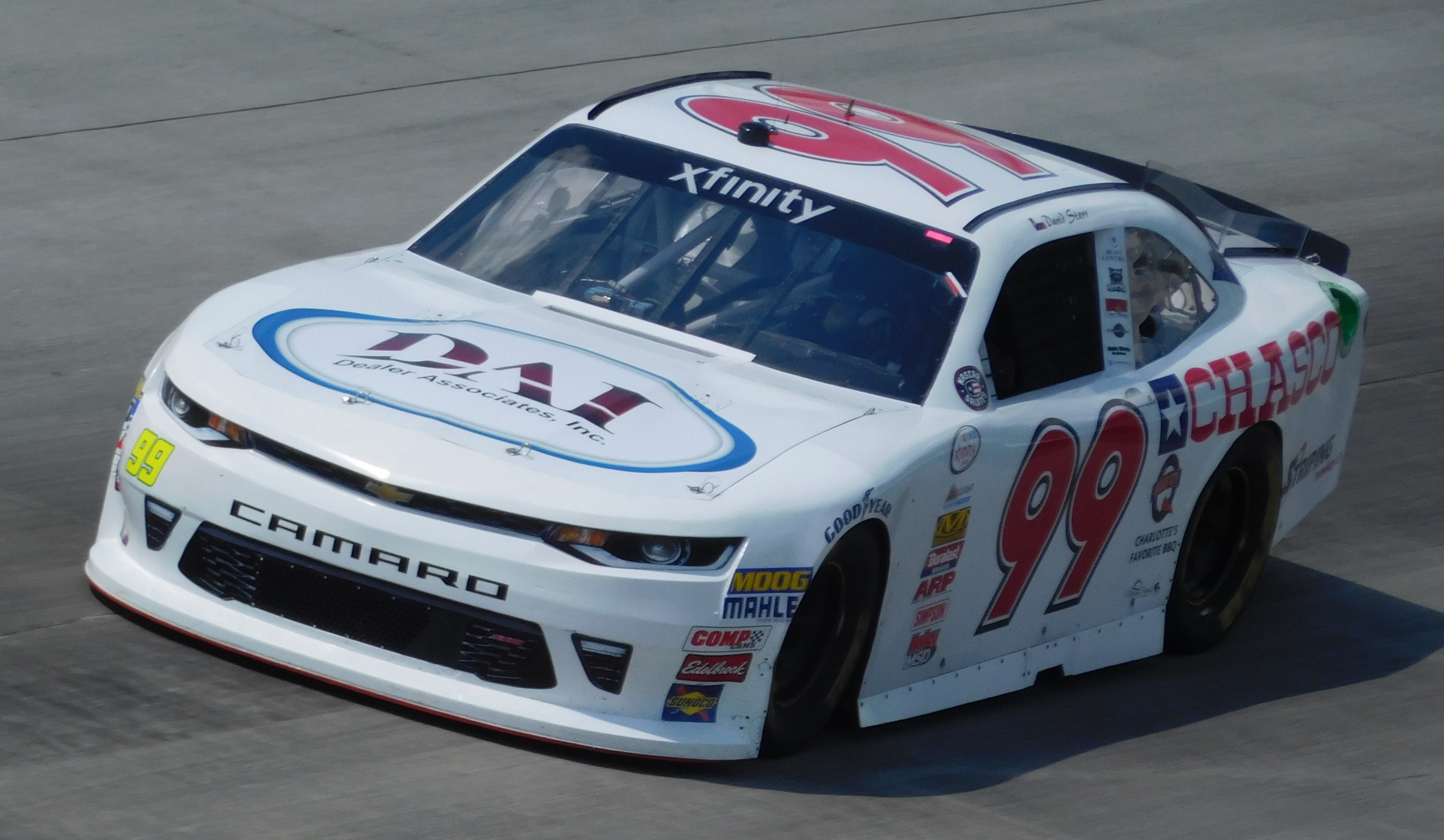
Starr in the No. 99 for B. J. McLeod Motorsports/SS-Green Light Racing at Dover in June 2017

In 2017, Starr left RSS to drive the No. 99 full-time for B. J. McLeod Motorsports, fielded jointly with SS-Green Light. Starr ended up getting his first career Xfinity Series top-five in the July race at Daytona, a race he was not even supposed to run. SS-Green Light had planned on replacing Starr with Korbin Forrister for this one race, but when he became ill, Starr got back in the ride, and went on to finish the season in the No. 99. In November, Starr made his return to the Cup Series at the 2017 AAA Texas 500, in which he drove the No. 66 Chevrolet for MBM Motorsports.

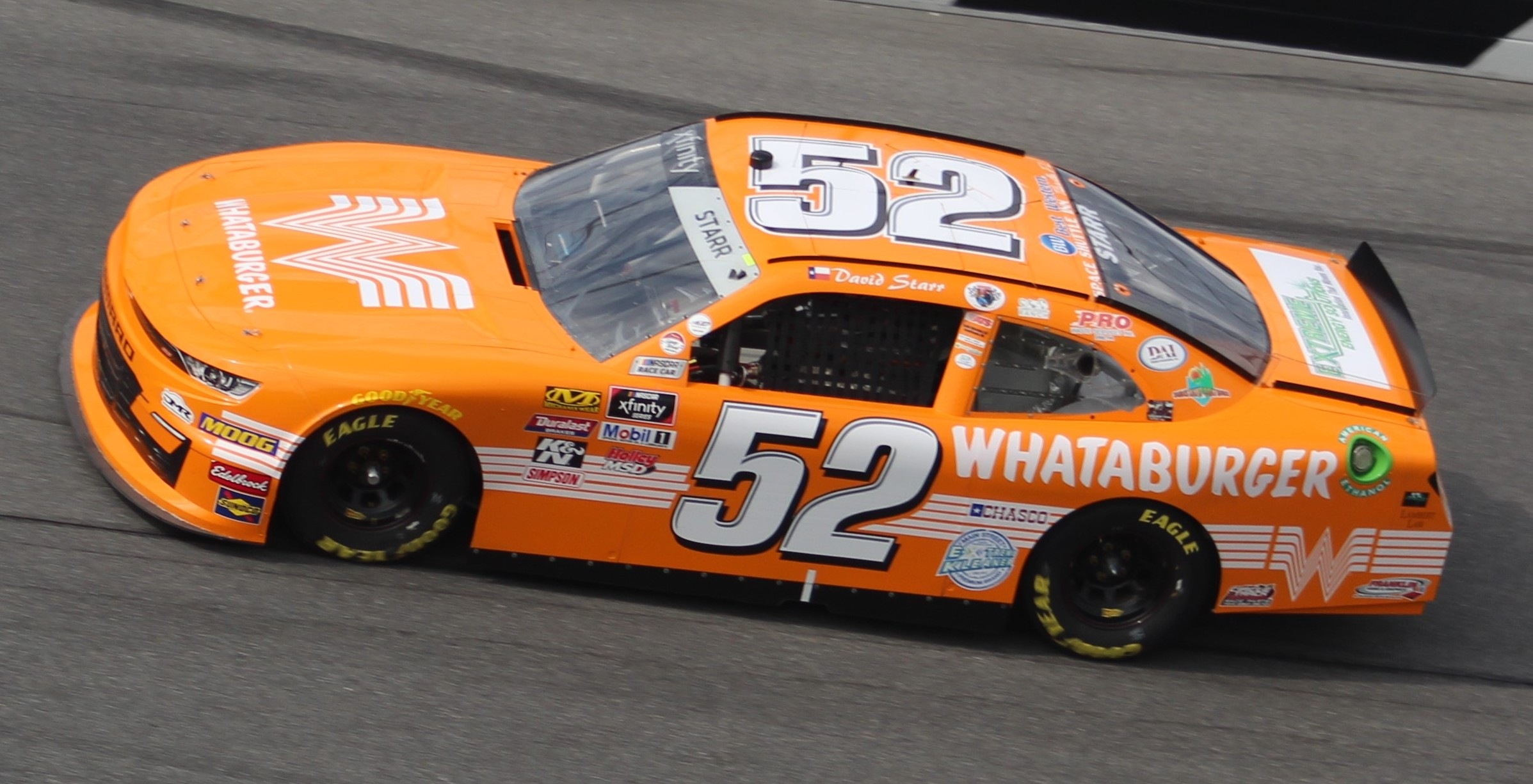
Starr in the No. 52 for Jimmy Means Racing at Daytona in February 2019

In 2018, Starr joined Jimmy Means Racing for a full season, replacing Joey Gase. He returned to the Cup Series to drive the Rick Ware Racing No. 51 car at the 2018 Brickyard 400, where he finished 39th. Starr drove the No. 97 Toyota Camry in Obaika Racing's Cup debut at the 2018 1000Bulbs.com 500 at Talladega. When Starr and Obaika failed to qualify, they attempted the race at Starr's home track of Texas a few weeks later, where they did make the race. He returned to Means in 2019 for another full season in the No. 52.

In 2020, Starr moved to JD Motorsports to drive their No. 6 car, renumbered from the No. 01. He lost his ride with the team on May 18 due to sponsorship problems caused by the COVID-19 pandemic. On June 9, he made his return to the Cup Series in the spring Martinsville race in the No. 53 for Rick Ware Racing. Starr returned to the Xfinity Series with SS-Green Light Racing at Texas in July, driving the No. 07, which was fielded in an alliance with RWR.

Starr joined MBM Motorsports to run the entire Xfinity Series schedule in 2021 except for the season-opener at Daytona in the team's No. 13 car. However, Starr ended up driving MBM's No. 61 for two races (at Phoenix in March and Charlotte in May) when Loris Hezemans drove the No. 13. He also participated at the 2021 Coca-Cola 600 for MBM in their No. 66 car, finishing 38 laps down at 36th place. Following the season finale weekend at Phoenix, Starr, along with team owner Carl Long and seven team members, tested positive for COVID-19.

In 2022, Starr would return to SS-Green Light Racing in the Xfinity Series for multiple races in the No. 08 Ford, and would have a best finish of eleventh at New Hampshire Motor Speedway, where he had originally finished thirteenth before Landon Cassill and Noah Gragson were both disqualified.

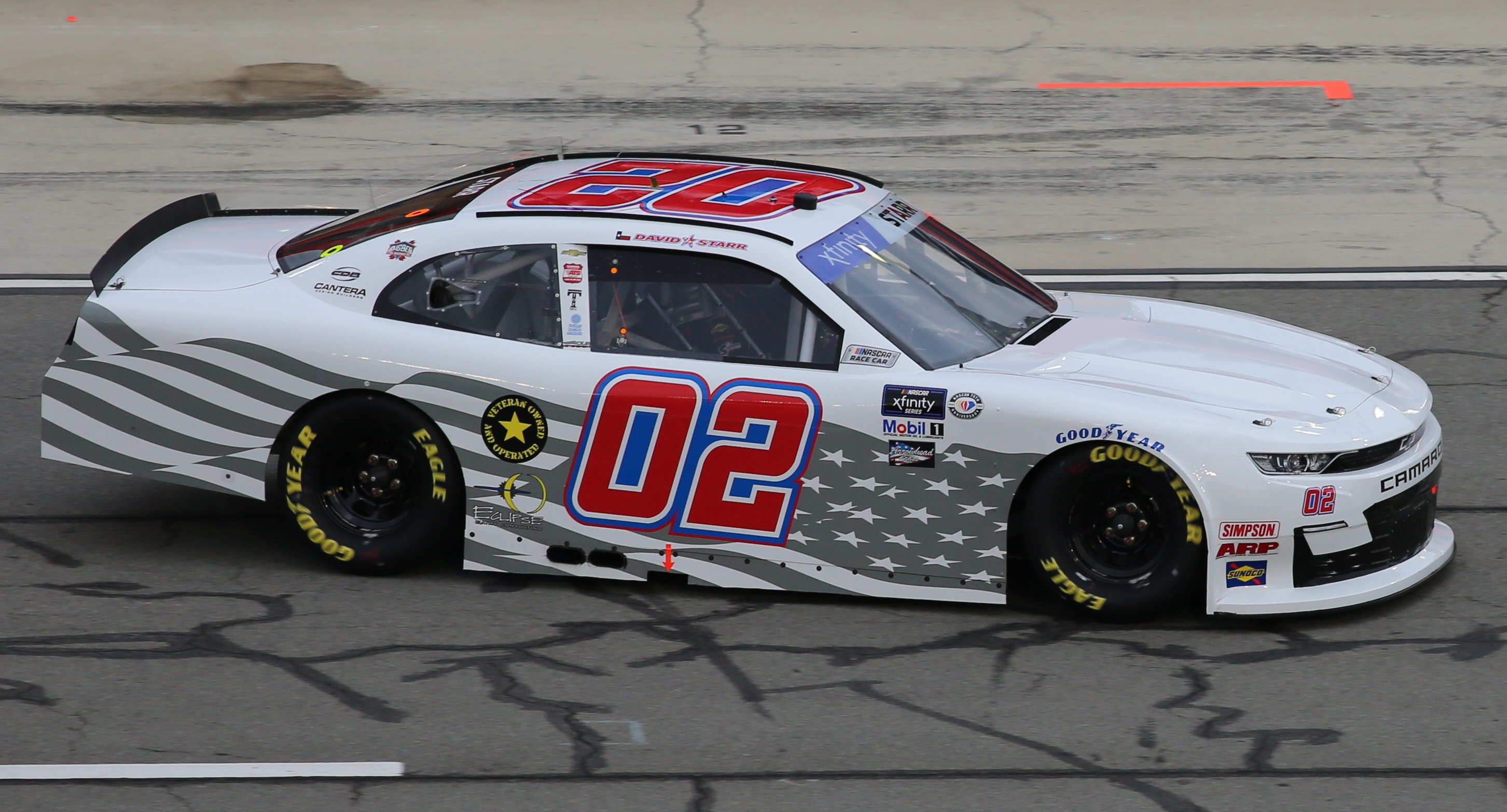
Starr at Auto Club Speedway in 2023

In 2023, it was announced that Starr would run the No. 02 Chevrolet for Our Motorsports on a part-time basis, starting at Daytona, although he was released after the race at California Speedway. He then attempted only four races for the remainder of the year, running two racing apiece for SS-Green Light Racing and Emerling-Gase Motorsports.

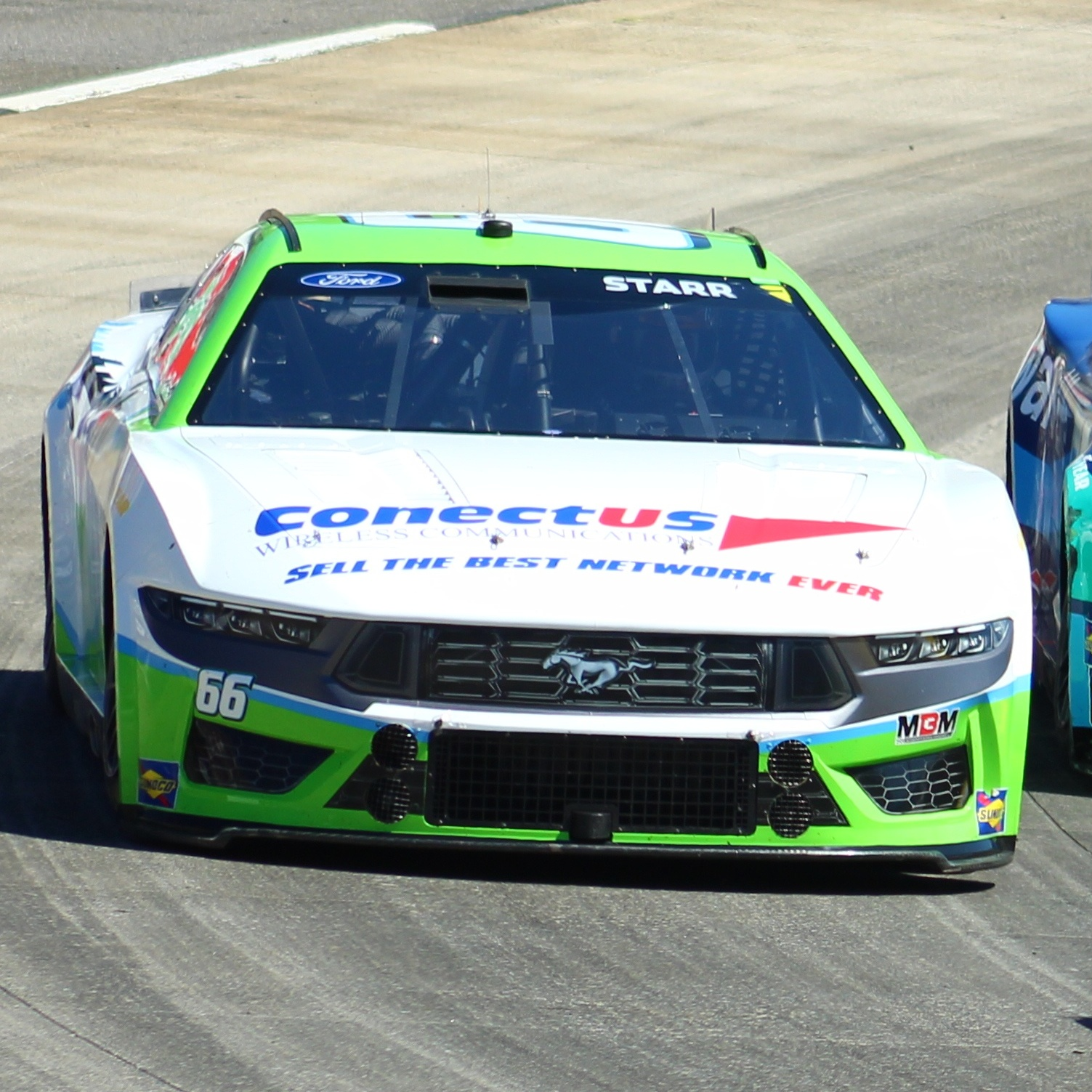
Starr's No. 66 car at Martinsville Speedway in 2024

In 2024, Starr rejoined MBM Motorsports for the season opening race at Daytona, driving the No. 66 Chevrolet, where he had originally qualified for the race, but had his time disallowed due to an issue in tech after qualifying. It was later announced that Starr will return to the NASCAR Cup Series at Martinsville Speedway & Charlotte Motor Speedway, driving the No. 66 Ford.

== Personal life ==
In December 2020, Starr launched the podcast Let's Go Racing with David Starr; Starr is joined by news anchor Tyler Jones and TheRacingExperts.com founder Dominic Aragon.

Starr has mentioned on his podcast he is Catholic. He and his wife Kim have two sons; David Jr. "DJ" and Vance.

== Motorsports career results ==
=== NASCAR ===
(key) (Bold – Pole position awarded by qualifying time. Italics – Pole position earned by points standings or practice time. * – Most laps led.)

==== Cup Series ====
NASCAR Cup Series results
Year	Team	No.	Make	1	2	3	4	5	6	7	8	9	10	11	12	13	14	15	16	17	18	19	20	21	22	23	24	25	26	27	28	29	30	31	32	33	34	35	36	NCSC	Pts	Ref
2003	Mike Starr Racing	75	Chevy	DAY	CAR	LVS	ATL	DAR	BRI	TEX; DNQ	TAL	MAR	CAL	RCH	CLT	DOV	POC	MCH	SON	DAY	CHI	NHA	POC	IND	GLN	MCH	BRI	DAR	RCH	NHA	DOV	TAL	KAN	CLT	MAR	ATL	PHO	CAR	HOM	N/A	0	
2009	BlackJack Racing	51	Dodge	DAY	CAL; DNQ	LVS	ATL	BRI	MAR	TEX	PHO	TAL	RCH	DAR																										N/A	0	
2009	Boys Will Be Boys Racing	06	Dodge												CLT; DNQ	DOV; DNQ	POC	MCH	SON	NHA	DAY	CHI	IND	POC	GLN	MCH	BRI	ATL	RCH	NHA	DOV	KAN	CAL	CLT	MAR	TAL	TEX	PHO	HOM	N/A	0	
2011	Leavine Family Racing	95	Ford	DAY	PHO	LVS	BRI	CAL	MAR	TEX; 38	TAL	RCH	DAR	DOV	CLT; 36	KAN	POC	MCH	SON	DAY	KEN; DNQ	NHA	IND	POC	GLN	MCH	BRI; 27	ATL; 29	RCH	CHI; DNQ	NHA	DOV	KAN; DNQ	CLT	TAL	MAR	TEX; DNQ	PHO	HOM	63rd	0	
2017	MBM Motorsports	66	Chevy	DAY	ATL	LVS	PHO	CAL	MAR	TEX	BRI	RCH	TAL	KAN	CLT	DOV	POC	MCH	SON	DAY	KEN	NHA	IND	POC	GLN	MCH	BRI	DAR	RCH	CHI	NHA	DOV	CLT	TAL	KAN	MAR	TEX; 38		HOM; 36	59th	0^{1}	
2017	MBM Motorsports	66	Toyota																																			PHO; 28		59th	0^{1}	
2018	Rick Ware Racing	51	Chevy	DAY	ATL	LVS	PHO	CAL	MAR	TEX	BRI	RCH	TAL	DOV	KAN	CLT	POC	MCH	SON	CHI	DAY	KEN	NHA	POC	GLN	MCH	BRI	DAR	IND; 39	LVS	RCH	CLT	DOV							73rd	0^{1}	
2018	Obaika Racing	97	Toyota																															TAL; DNQ	KAN	MAR	TEX; 39	PHO	HOM	73rd	0^{1}	
2020	Rick Ware Racing	53	Chevy	DAY	LVS	CAL	PHO	DAR	DAR	CLT	CLT	BRI	ATL	MAR; 32	HOM	TAL	POC	POC	IND	KEN	TEX	KAN	NHA	MCH	MCH	DAY	DOV	DOV	DAY	DAR	RCH	BRI	LVS	TAL	CLT	KAN	TEX	MAR	PHO	51st	0^{1}	
2021	MBM Motorsports	66	Toyota	DAY	DAY	HOM	LVS	PHO	ATL	BRI	MAR	RCH	TAL	KAN	DAR	DOV	COA	CLT; 36	SON													BRI; 32	LVS	TAL	CLT					54th	0^{1}	
2021	MBM Motorsports	13	Toyota																	NSH; 34	POC	POC	ROA	ATL	NHA	GLN	IND	MCH											PHO; 33	54th	0^{1}	
2021	MBM Motorsports	66	Ford																										DAY; 27	DAR	RCH					TEX; 23				54th	0^{1}	
2021	MBM Motorsports	13	Ford																																		KAN; 34	MAR		54th	0^{1}	
2024	MBM Motorsports	66	Ford	DAY	ATL	LVS	PHO	BRI	COA	RCH	MAR; 37	TEX	TAL	DOV	KAN	DAR	CLT	GTW	SON	IOW	NHA	NSH	CSC	POC	IND	RCH	MCH	DAY	DAR	ATL	GLN	BRI	KAN	TAL	ROV	LVS	HOM	MAR	PHO	61st	0^{1}	
2025	Garage 66	66	Ford	DAY	ATL	COA	PHO	LVS	HOM	MAR	DAR	BRI	TAL	TEX	KAN	CLT	NSH	MCH	MXC	POC	ATL; 29	CSC	SON	DOV	IND	IOW	GLN	RCH	DAY	DAR	GTW	BRI	NHA	KAN	ROV	LVS	TAL	MAR	PHO	56th	0^{1}	

==== O'Reilly Auto Parts Series ====
NASCAR O'Reilly Auto Parts Series results
Year	Team	No.	Make	1	2	3	4	5	6	7	8	9	10	11	12	13	14	15	16	17	18	19	20	21	22	23	24	25	26	27	28	29	30	31	32	33	34	35	NOAPSC	Pts	Ref
2000	Day Enterprise Racing	16	Pontiac	DAY; DNQ	CAR	LVS	ATL	DAR	BRI	TEX	NSV	TAL; 42	CAL	RCH	NHA	CLT	DOV	SBO	MYB	GLN	MLW; DNQ	NZH	PPR	GTY	IRP	MCH	BRI	DAR	RCH	DOV	CLT	CAR	MEM	PHO	HOM				111th	37	
2001	Day Enterprise Racing	16	Pontiac	DAY; 34	CAR	LVS	ATL; 27	DAR	BRI			TAL; 38	CAL	RCH	NHA	NZH	CLT	DOV	KEN	MLW	GLN	CHI	GTY	PPR	IRP	MCH	BRI	DAR	RCH	DOV	KAN	CLT	MEM	PHO	CAR	HOM			68th	304	
2001	A. J. Foyt Enterprises	41	Chevy							TEX; 17	NSH																												68th	304	
2002	Jay Robinson Racing	49	Ford	DAY	CAR	LVS	DAR	BRI	TEX; 33	NSH	TAL	CAL	RCH	NHA	NZH	CLT	DOV	NSH	KEN	MLW	DAY	CHI	GTY	PPR	IRP	MCH	BRI	DAR	RCH	DOV	KAN	CLT	MEM	ATL	CAR	PHO	HOM		112th	64	
2004	Holigan Racing	50	Chevy	DAY	CAR	LVS; DNQ	DAR	BRI	TEX; 30	NSH; 29	TAL	CAL; DNQ	GTY; 24	RCH	NZH	CLT	DOV	NSH	KEN	MLW	DAY	CHI	NHA	PPR	IRP	MCH	BRI	CAL	RCH	DOV	KAN	CLT	MEM	ATL	PHO	DAR	HOM		86th	240	
2010	Day Enterprise Racing	05	Chevy	DAY	CAL	LVS	BRI	NSH	PHO	TEX; 34	TAL	RCH	DAR	DOV	CLT	NSH	KEN	ROA	NHA	DAY; 23	CHI	GTY	IRP; 21	IOW	GLN	MCH	BRI	CGV	ATL	RCH	DOV	KAN	CAL	CLT; 24	GTY	TEX; 38	PHO; 25	HOM; 22	65th	580	
2011	Day Enterprise Racing	05	Chevy	DAY; 21	PHO	LVS	BRI	CAL	TEX; 23	TAL	NSH	RCH	DAR	DOV	IOW	CLT	CHI	MCH	ROA	DAY	KEN	NHA	NSH	IRP	IOW	GLN	CGV	BRI; 33	ATL	RCH	CHI	DOV	KAN	CLT	TEX	PHO	HOM		133rd	0^{1}	
2012	MAKE Motorsports	50	Chevy	DAY	PHO	LVS	BRI	CAL	TEX	RCH	TAL	DAR	IOW	CLT	DOV	MCH	ROA	KEN	DAY	NHA	CHI	IND	IOW	GLN	CGV	BRI; 39	ATL; 27	RCH; DNQ	CHI	KEN; 33	DOV; DNQ								120th	0^{1}	
2012	SR² Motorsports	24	Toyota																													CLT; 25	KAN	TEX; 23	PHO	HOM; 24			120th	0^{1}	
2013	Viva Motorsports	55	Chevy	DAY	PHO	LVS	BRI	CAL	TEX	RCH	TAL	DAR	CLT	DOV	IOW	MCH	ROA	KEN	DAY	NHA	CHI	IND; 21	IOW	GLN	MOH									TEX; 21	PHO	HOM			120th	0^{1}	
2013	Vision Racing	17	Toyota																							BRI; DNQ	ATL	RCH	CHI	KEN	DOV	KAN	CLT						120th	0^{1}	
2014	TriStar Motorsports	10	Toyota	DAY; 25	PHO	LVS	BRI																										CLT; 20						26th	293	
2014	TriStar Motorsports	44	Toyota					CAL; 24	TEX; 15	DAR; 35	RCH	TAL; 9	IOW	CLT; 24	DOV	MCH	ROA	KEN	DAY; 25	NHA	CHI; 22	IND; 25	IOW	GLN	MOH	BRI; 31	ATL	RCH	CHI	KEN	DOV	KAN; 15		TEX; 25	PHO				26th	293	
2014	SS-Green Light Racing	55	Chevy																																	HOM; 30			26th	293	
2015	TriStar Motorsports	44	Toyota	DAY; 6	ATL; 26	LVS; 17	PHO; 21	CAL; 15	TEX; 23	BRI; 18	RCH; 29	TAL; 14	IOW; 16	CLT; 22	DOV; 13	MCH; 33	CHI; 24	DAY; 29	KEN; 21	NHA; 22	IND; 36	IOW; 22	GLN; 26	MOH; 31	BRI; 20	ROA; 20	DAR; 22	RCH; 37	CHI; 23	KEN; 20	DOV; 18	CLT; 25	KAN; 22	TEX; 25	PHO; 21	HOM; 25			16th	713	
2016	TriStar Motorsports	44	Toyota	DAY; 18	ATL; 39	LVS; 23	PHO; 22	CAL; 38	TEX; 18	BRI; 17	RCH	TAL	DOV	CLT	POC	MCH	IOW																						22nd	374	
2016	RSS Racing	93	Chevy															DAY; 27	KEN; 21	NHA; 36	IND; 24	IOW; 21	GLN; DNQ	MOH; 25	BRI; 16	ROA; 24	DAR; 23	RCH; 21	CHI; 18	KEN; 33	DOV; 28	CLT; 29	KAN; 24	TEX; 24	PHO; DNQ	HOM; DNQ			22nd	374	
2017	BJMM with SS-Green Light Racing	99	Chevy	DAY; 40	ATL; 32	LVS; 28	PHO; 32	CAL; 24	TEX; 24	BRI; 36	RCH; 17	TAL; 18	CLT; 31	DOV; 33	POC; 25	MCH; 21	IOW; 14	DAY; 5	KEN; 31	NHA; 30	IND; 29	IOW; 26	GLN; 30	MOH; 17	BRI; 40	ROA; 28	DAR; 36	RCH; 35	CHI; 22	KEN; 29	DOV; 38	CLT; 26	KAN; 27	TEX; 31	PHO; 29	HOM; 32			25th	315	
2018	Jimmy Means Racing	52	Chevy	DAY; 17	ATL; 28	LVS; 35	PHO; 39	CAL; 26	TEX; 21	BRI; 24	RCH; 35	TAL; 32	DOV; 26	CLT; 20	POC; 20	MCH; 33	IOW; 24	CHI; 23	DAY; 35	KEN; 23	NHA; 28	IOW; 19	GLN; 33	MOH; 21	BRI; 21	ROA; 36	DAR; 36	IND; 18	LVS; 32	RCH; 20	CLT; 27	DOV; 24	KAN; 17	TEX; 24	PHO; 27	HOM; 28			23rd	352	
2019	Jimmy Means Racing	52	Chevy	DAY; 20	ATL; 27	LVS; 19	PHO; 27	CAL; 21	TEX; 20	BRI; 25	RCH; 29	TAL; 14	DOV; 28	CLT; 22	POC; 24	MCH; 25	IOW; 34	CHI; 36	DAY; 32	KEN; 21	NHA; 26	IOW; 31	GLN; 29	MOH; 33	BRI; 24	ROA; 17	DAR; 27	IND; 37	LVS; 26	RCH; 25	CLT; 34	DOV; 21	KAN; 23	TEX; 33	PHO; 25	HOM; 23			22nd	364	
2020	JD Motorsports	6	Chevy	DAY; 18	LVS; 24	CAL; 21	PHO; 26	DAR	CLT	BRI	ATL	HOM	HOM	TAL	POC	IND	KEN	KEN																					32nd	162	
2020	SS-Green Light Racing	07	Chevy																TEX; 13	KAN; 24	ROA	DAY	DOV; 27	DOV; 20	DAY	DAR; 34	RCH	RCH	BRI	LVS	TAL	CLT	KAN; 24	TEX; 35	MAR	PHO; 16			32nd	162	
2021	MBM Motorsports	13	Toyota	DAY	DAY; 38	HOM; 21																	GLN; DNQ	IND															31st	265	
2021	MBM Motorsports	13	Ford				LVS; 29																																31st	265	
2021	MBM Motorsports	61	Toyota					PHO; 28	ATL; 27	MAR; 22	TAL; 16	DAR; 17	DOV; 40	COA	CLT; DNQ	MOH; 36					ATL; 40					DAY; 14	DAR; 30			LVS; 21	TAL; 40	CLT							31st	265	
2021	MBM Motorsports	66	Toyota														TEX; 20	NSH; 24	POC; 33	ROA		NHA; 20			MCH; 22			RCH; 28	BRI; 30				TEX; 34		MAR; 24	PHO; 21			31st	265	
2021	MBM Motorsports	66	Ford																		ATL; RL^{†}													KAN; 36					31st	265	
2022	SS-Green Light Racing	08	Ford	DAY; DNQ	CAL	LVS; DNQ	PHO; 31	ATL; DNQ	COA	RCH; 23	MAR; 23	TAL; 33	DOV; 35	DAR; 27	TEX; 21	CLT; DNQ	PIR	NSH	ROA	ATL; 22	NHA; 11	POC; 27	IND	MCH; 35	GLN	DAY; 31	DAR; 25	KAN; 23	BRI; 30	TEX; 37	TAL; 25	CLT	LVS; 31	HOM; 21	MAR	PHO			32nd	199	
2023	Our Motorsports	02	Chevy	DAY; 22	CAL; 35	LVS	PHO	ATL	COA	RCH	MAR																												47th	54	
2023	SS-Green Light Racing	07	Chevy									TAL; DNQ	DOV	DAR	CLT	PIR	SON														TEX; 22	ROV	LVS	HOM	MAR	PHO			47th	54	
2023	Emerling-Gase Motorsports	35	Chevy															NSH; 30	CSC																				47th	54	
2023	Emerling-Gase Motorsports	35	Ford																	ATL; 22	NHA	POC	ROA	MCH	IRC	GLN	DAY	DAR	KAN	BRI									47th	54	
2024	MBM Motorsports	66	Chevy	DAY; DNQ	ATL	LVS	PHO	COA	RCH	MAR		TAL; 24																											37th	134	
2024	SS-Green Light Racing	14	Ford								TEX; 28			DAR; 24	CLT	PIR	SON						IND; 26	MCH	DAY														37th	134	
2024	SS-Green Light Racing	14	Chevy										DOV; 26					IOW; 17	NHA	NSH	CSC	POC					ATL; 22	GLN	BRI	KAN	TAL; 8	ROV	LVS	HOM	MAR	PHO			37th	134	
2024	Joey Gase Motorsports	35	Chevy																							DAR; 24													37th	134	
2025	Joey Gase Motorsports with Scott Osteen	53	Chevy	DAY	ATL	COA	PHO	LVS	HOM	MAR	DAR; 26	BRI	CAR	TAL	TEX	CLT	NSH	MXC	POC	ATL	CSC	SON	DOV; DNQ																47th	38	
2025	Joey Gase Motorsports with Scott Osteen	35	Chevy																					IND; 29	IOW	GLN	DAY	PIR	GTW	BRI	KAN	ROV	LVS	TAL; 18	MAR	PHO			47th	38	
2026	Joey Gase Motorsports with Scott Osteen	53	Chevy	DAY; DNQ	ATL	COA	PHO	LVS	DAR	MAR	CAR	BRI	KAN		TEX; 29	GLN	DOV; 33	CLT; 20	NSH; 37	POC	COR	SON	CHI	ATL															48th	35	
2026	Young's Motorsports	42	Chevy											TAL; 38																									48th	35	
2026	Mike Harmon Racing with Team Stange Racing	47	Chevy																						IND; 35	IOW	DAY	DAR	GTW										48th	35	
2026	Joey Gase Motorsports with Scott Osteen	55	Chevy																											BRI; 35	LVS	CLT	PHO	TAL	MAR	HOM			48th	35	
^{†} – Relieved C. J. McLaughlin.

==== Camping World Truck Series ====
NASCAR Camping World Truck Series results
Year	Team	No.	Make	1	2	3	4	5	6	7	8	9	10	11	12	13	14	15	16	17	18	19	20	21	22	23	24	25	26	27	NCWTC	Pts	Ref
1998	Reher-Morrison Racing	9	Chevy	WDW; DNQ	HOM	PHO; 25	POR	EVG	I70; 23	GLN	TEX; 18	BRI	MLW	NZH	CAL; 36	PPR								MEM; 24	GTY	MAR	SON	MMR	PHO	LVS; DNQ	42nd	566	
1998	Reher-Morrison Racing	49	Chevy														IRP; DNQ	NHA	FLM	NSV	HPT	LVL	RCH								42nd	566	
1999	Sonntag Racing	73	Chevy	HOM	PHO; 18	EVG; 20	MMR; 26	MAR; 19	MEM; 32	PPR; 20	I70; 21	BRI; 19	TEX; 14			MLW; 24	NSV; 26		MCH; 24	NHA; 20	IRP; 21	GTY; 28	HPT; 32	RCH; 32	LVS; 33		TEX; 32				22nd	2132	
1999	Team 23 Racing	23	Chevy											PIR; 31	GLN; 29																22nd	2132	
1999	McGlynn Racing	0	Chevy															NZH; 21													22nd	2132	
1999	CJ Racing	17	Chevy																							LVL; 21					22nd	2132	
1999	Morgan-Dollar Motorsports	45	Ford																									CAL; 32			22nd	2132	
2000	Team Texas Racing	35	Chevy	DAY; 36	HOM	PHO																									29th	1163	
2000	Nessa Motorsports	28	Ford				MMR; 29																								29th	1163	
2000	Conely Racing	7	Chevy					MAR; 20	PIR	GTY; 15	MEM; 11	PPR	EVG	TEX; 11	KEN; 15	GLN	MLW	NHA		MCH; 29	IRP; 21	NSV; 33	CIC	RCH	DOV						29th	1163	
2000	Ware Racing Enterprises	81	Chevy																NZH; 29												29th	1163	
2000	TKO Motorsports	41	Dodge																							TEX; 12	CAL; 34				29th	1163	
2001	TKO Motorsports	41	Dodge	DAY; 34	HOM	MMR	MAR	GTY	DAR	PPR	DOV																				47th	541	
2001	Team Menard	3	Chevy									TEX; 3	MEM	MLW	KAN	KEN	NHA	IRP	NSH	CIC	NZH	RCH	SBO	TEX; 4	LVS; 7	PHO	CAL; 5				47th	541	
2002	Spears Motorsports	75	Chevy	DAY; 7	DAR; 6	MAR; 8	GTY; 5	PPR; 5	DOV; 4	TEX; 3	MEM; 7	MLW; 6	KAN; 24	KEN; 8	NHA; 3	MCH; 5	IRP; 34	NSH; 11	RCH; 13	TEX; 3	SBO; 7	**LVS**; 1	**CAL**; 11	PHO; 18	HOM; 8						5th	3144	
2003	Spears Motorsports	75	Chevy	DAY; 36	DAR; 9	MMR; 9	MAR; 12	CLT; 17	DOV; 3	TEX; 6	MEM	MLW	KAN	KEN	GTW; 6	MCH; 13	IRP; 11	NSH; 4	BRI; 18	RCH; 32	NHA; 8	CAL; 5	LVS; 2	SBO; 9	TEX; 31	MAR; 9	PHO; 6	HOM; 3			13th	2768	
2004	Spears Motorsports	75	Chevy	DAY; 12	ATL; 36	MAR; 9	MFD; 9	**CLT**; 3	DOV; 8	TEX; 29	MEM; 10	MLW; 33	KAN; 19	KEN; 3	GTW; 1	MCH; 21	IRP; 16	NSH; 2	BRI; 7	RCH; 23	NHA; 8	LVS; 10	CAL; 4	TEX; 4	MAR; 29	PHO; 1	DAR; 7	HOM; 3			6th	3298	
2005	Spears Motorsports	75	Chevy	DAY; 8	CAL; 27*	ATL; 5	MAR; 22	GTY; 21	MFD; 9	CLT; 19	**DOV**; 8	TEX; 9	MCH; 12	MLW; 11	KAN; 24	KEN; 10	MEM; 5	IRP; 17	NSH; 17	BRI; 8	**RCH**; 21	NHA; 13	LVS; 3	MAR; 21	ATL; 11	TEX; 4	PHO; 14	HOM; 11			7th	3148	
2006	Red Horse Racing	11	Toyota	DAY; 14	CAL; 12	ATL; 15	MAR; 1*	GTY; 8	CLT; 26	MFD; 3	DOV; 11	TEX; 18	MCH; 13	MLW; 8	KAN; 8	KEN; 8	MEM; 11	IRP; 4	NSH; 20	BRI; 5	NHA; 5	LVS; 20	TAL; 24	MAR; 2	ATL; 11	TEX; 16	PHO; 6	HOM; 7			4th	3355	
2007	Circle Bar Racing	10	Ford	DAY; 20	CAL; 28	ATL; 22	MAR; 11	KAN; 15	CLT; 23	MFD; 19	DOV; 25	TEX; 5	MCH; 13	MLW; 10	MEM; 13	KEN; 12	IRP; 17	NSH; 4	BRI; 17	GTW; 22	NHA; 14	LVS; 14	TAL; 11	MAR; 4	ATL; 15	TEX; 19	PHO; 36	HOM; 6			10th	2921	
2008	Red Horse Racing	11	Toyota	DAY; 4	CAL; 13	ATL; 21	MAR; 6	KAN; 27	CLT; 17	MFD; 2*	DOV; 6	TEX; 27	MCH; 26	MLW; 23	MEM; 5	KEN; 5	IRP; 16	NSH; 9	BRI; 29	GTW; 28	NHA; 7	LVS; 22	TAL; 19	MAR; 33	ATL; 14	TEX; 12	PHO; 13	HOM; 22			12th	2929	
2009	HT Motorsports	24	Toyota	DAY; 17	CAL; 4	ATL; 17	MAR; 24	KAN; 17	CLT; 7	DOV; 3	TEX; 7	MCH; 11	MLW; 9	MEM; 3	KEN; 9	IRP; 9	NSH; 18	BRI; 7	CHI; 22	IOW; 26	GTW; 16	NHA; 13	LVS; 15	MAR; 8	TAL; 5	TEX; 9	PHO; 9	HOM; 7			9th	3271	
2010	Randy Moss Motorsports	81	Toyota	DAY; 19	ATL; 15	MAR; 18	NSH; 16	KAN; 10	DOV; 6	CLT; 9	TEX; 16	MCH; 8	IOW; 10	GTY; 13	IRP; 9	POC; 13	NSH; 14	DAR; 12	BRI; 23												9th	3170	
2010	SS-Green Light Racing	21	Chevy																	CHI; 10											9th	3170	
2010	SS-Green Light Racing	81	Toyota																		KEN; 14	NHA; 15	LVS; 12	MAR; 7	TAL; 11	TEX; 15	PHO; 8	HOM; 11			9th	3170	
2011	SS-Green Light Racing	81	Toyota	DAY; 13	PHO; 34	DAR; 10	MAR; 26	NSH; 8	DOV; 12	CLT; 28	KAN; 16	TEX; 30	KEN; 8	IOW; 9	NSH; 8	IRP; 3	POC; 18	MCH; 5	BRI; 11	ATL; 17	CHI; 19	NHA; 14	KEN; 10	LVS; 16	TAL; 30	MAR; 22	TEX; 23	HOM; 11			13th	703	
2012	Arrington Racing	81	Toyota	DAY; 21	MAR; 14	CAR; 13	KAN; 31	CLT; 17	DOV; 14	TEX; 13	KEN; 15	IOW; 28	CHI; 10	POC	MCH	BRI; 13	ATL; 18	IOW	KEN	LVS	TAL; 22	MAR; 16	TEX; 21	PHO	HOM; 16						19th	423	
2013	SS-Green Light Racing	81	Toyota	DAY; 31	MAR; 13	CAR; 20	KAN; 13	CLT; 23	DOV; 14	TEX; 17	KEN	IOW	ELD	POC	MCH	BRI; 23	MSP	IOW	CHI	LVS	TAL; 2	MAR	TEX; 23	PHO; 23	HOM						24th	284	

==== Winston West Series ====
NASCAR Winston West Series results
Year	Team	No.	Make	1	2	3	4	5	6	7	8	9	10	11	12	13	14	NWWSC	Pts	Ref
1998	Mike Starr Racing	35	Chevy	TUS	LVS	PHO	CAL	HPT	MMR	AMP	POR	CAL	PPR	EVG	SON	MMR	LVS; 7	65th	146	
1999	Mike Starr Racing	35	Chevy	TUS	LVS; 32	PHO	CAL; 35	PPR	MMR	IRW	EVG	POR	IRW	RMR	LVS; 16	MMR	MOT	47th	240	
2000	Mike Starr Racing	35	Chevy	PHO	MMR	LVS; 1	CAL; 7	LAG	IRW	POR	EVG	IRW	RMR	MMR	IRW			31st	326	

^{*} Season still in progress
^{1} Ineligible for series points

=== ARCA SuperCar Series ===
(key) (Bold – Pole position awarded by qualifying time. Italics – Pole position earned by points standings or practice time. * – Most laps led.)

ARCA SuperCar Series results
Year	Team	No.	Make	1	2	3	4	5	6	7	8	9	10	11	12	13	14	15	16	17	18	19	20	21	ASSC	Pts	Ref
1992	Info not available			DAY	FIF	TWS	TAL	TOL	KIL	POC	MCH	FRS	KIL	NSH	DEL	POC	HPT	FRS	ISF	TOL	DSF	TWS; DNQ	SLM	ATL	N/A	0	

Achievements
Preceded by Joe Ruttman	NASCAR Craftsman Truck Series Most Popular Driver; 2002	Succeeded by Brendan Gaughan
