= 2018 AAA Texas 500 =

Race details
- Race 34 of 36 in the 2018 Monster Energy NASCAR Cup Series
- Date: November 4, 2018
- Location: Texas Motor Speedway in Fort Worth, Texas
- Course: Permanent racing facility
- Course length: 1.5 miles (2.414 km)
- Distance: 337 laps, 505.5 mi (813.523 km)
- Scheduled distance: 334 laps, 501 mi (806.281 km)
- Average speed: 150.558 miles per hour (242.300 km/h)

Pole position
Driver	Ryan Blaney	Team Penske
- Time: 26.932

Most laps led
Driver	Kevin Harvick	Stewart–Haas Racing
- Laps: 177

Winner
No. 4	Kevin Harvick	Stewart–Haas Racing

Television in the United States
- Network: NBCSN
- Announcers: Rick Allen, Jeff Burton, Steve Letarte and Dale Earnhardt Jr.
- Nielsen ratings: 1.4/1.5 (Overnight)

Radio in the United States
- Radio: PRN
- Booth announcers: Doug Rice and Mark Garrow
- Turn announcers: Rob Albright (1 & 2) and Pat Patterson (3 & 4)

The 2018 AAA Texas 500 was a Monster Energy NASCAR Cup Series race that was held on November 4, 2018, at Texas Motor Speedway in Fort Worth, Texas. Contested over 337 laps – extended from 334 laps due to an overtime finish – on the 1.5-mile (2.4-kilometre) intermediate quad-oval, it was the 34th race of the 2018 Monster Energy NASCAR Cup Series season, the eighth race of the Playoffs, and the second race of the Round of 8.

Leading 177 laps during the race, Stewart–Haas Racing driver Kevin Harvick took his 8th victory of the season, which was initially thought to advance him to the Championship 4. However, Harvick's car was found to have a non-conforming spoiler during post-race technical checks, and as a result, lost his automatic qualification to the Championship 4.

== Report ==
=== Background ===
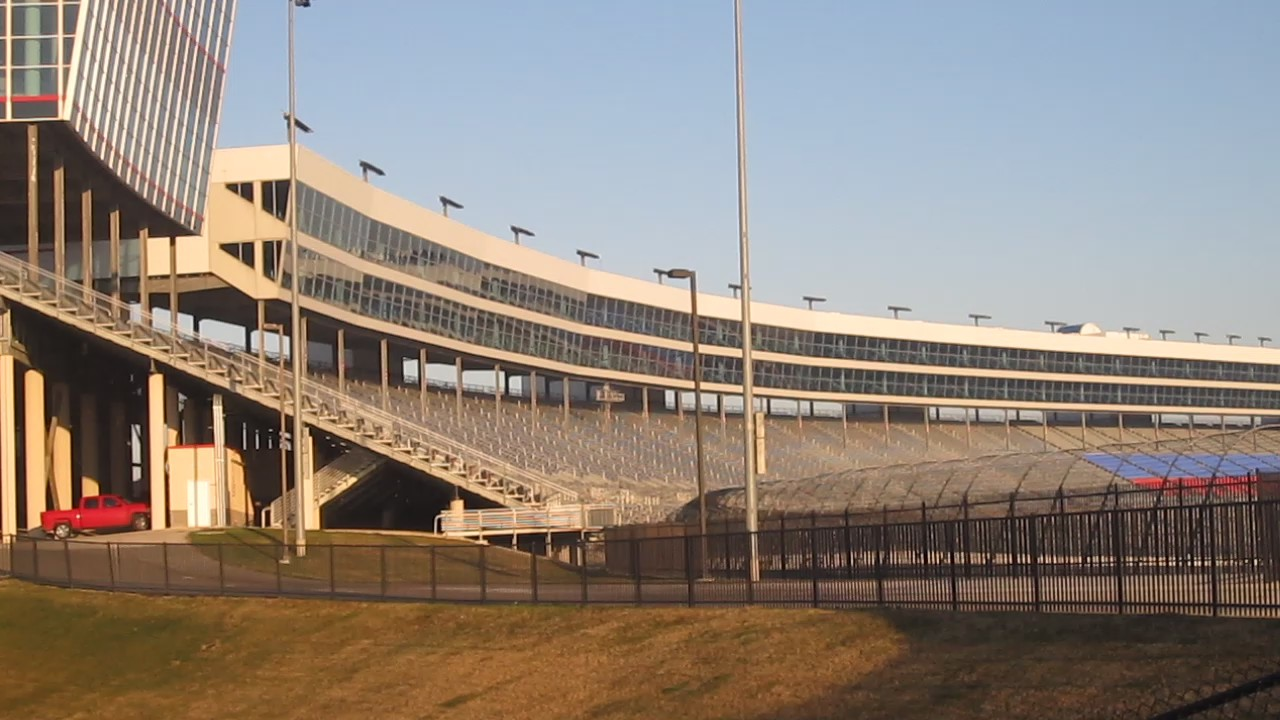
Texas Motor Speedway, the track where the race was held.

Texas Motor Speedway is a speedway located in Fort Worth, Texas. The track measures 1.5 miles (2.4 kilometres) around and is banked 24 degrees in the turns, and is of the oval design, where the front straightaway juts outward slightly. The track layout is similar to Charlotte Motor Speedway. The track is owned by Speedway Motorsports.

==== Entry list ====
No.	Driver	Team	Manufacturer
00	Landon Cassill (i)	StarCom Racing	Chevrolet
1	Jamie McMurray	Chip Ganassi Racing	Chevrolet
2	Brad Keselowski	Team Penske	Ford
3	Austin Dillon	Richard Childress Racing	Chevrolet
4	Kevin Harvick	Stewart–Haas Racing	Ford
6	Trevor Bayne	Roush Fenway Racing	Ford
7	Reed Sorenson (i)	Premium Motorsports	Chevrolet
9	Chase Elliott	Hendrick Motorsports	Chevrolet
10	Aric Almirola	Stewart–Haas Racing	Ford
11	Denny Hamlin	Joe Gibbs Racing	Toyota
12	Ryan Blaney	Team Penske	Ford
13	Ty Dillon	Germain Racing	Chevrolet
14	Clint Bowyer	Stewart–Haas Racing	Ford
15	Ross Chastain (i)	Premium Motorsports	Chevrolet
17	Ricky Stenhouse Jr.	Roush Fenway Racing	Ford
18	Kyle Busch	Joe Gibbs Racing	Toyota
19	Daniel Suárez	Joe Gibbs Racing	Toyota
20	Erik Jones	Joe Gibbs Racing	Toyota
21	Paul Menard	Wood Brothers Racing	Ford
22	Joey Logano	Team Penske	Ford
23	J. J. Yeley (i)	BK Racing	Toyota
24	William Byron (R)	Hendrick Motorsports	Chevrolet
31	Ryan Newman	Richard Childress Racing	Chevrolet
32	Matt DiBenedetto	Go Fas Racing	Ford
34	Michael McDowell	Front Row Motorsports	Ford
37	Chris Buescher	JTG Daugherty Racing	Chevrolet
38	David Ragan	Front Row Motorsports	Ford
41	Kurt Busch	Stewart–Haas Racing	Ford
42	Kyle Larson	Chip Ganassi Racing	Chevrolet
43	Bubba Wallace (R)	Richard Petty Motorsports	Chevrolet
47	A. J. Allmendinger	JTG Daugherty Racing	Chevrolet
48	Jimmie Johnson	Hendrick Motorsports	Chevrolet
51	Joey Gase (i)	Rick Ware Racing	Ford
66	Timmy Hill (i)	MBM Motorsports	Toyota
72	Corey LaJoie	TriStar Motorsports	Chevrolet
78	Martin Truex Jr.	Furniture Row Racing	Toyota
88	Alex Bowman	Hendrick Motorsports	Chevrolet
95	Regan Smith	Leavine Family Racing	Chevrolet
96	Parker Kligerman (i)	Gaunt Brothers Racing	Toyota
97	David Starr (i)	Obaika Racing	Toyota
99	Kyle Weatherman	StarCom Racing	Chevrolet
Official entry list

== First practice ==
Ryan Blaney was the fastest in the first practice session with a time of 27.139 seconds and a speed of 198.976 mph (320.221 km/h).

Pos	No.	Driver	Team	Manufacturer	Time	Speed
1	12	Ryan Blaney	Team Penske	Ford	27.139	198.976
2	4	Kevin Harvick	Stewart–Haas Racing	Ford	27.210	198.456
3	41	Kurt Busch	Stewart–Haas Racing	Ford	27.254	198.136
Official first practice results

== Qualifying ==
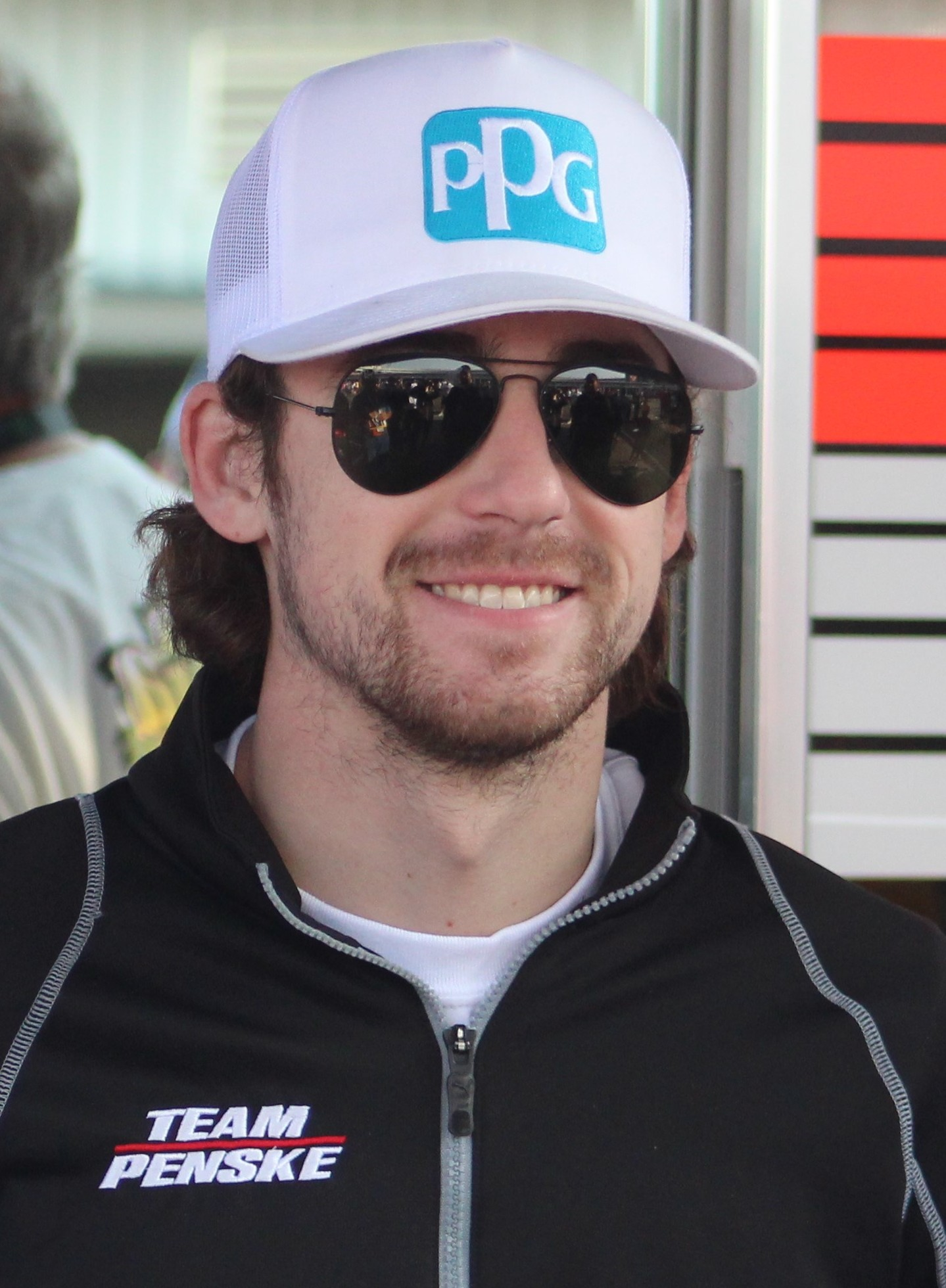
Ryan Blaney scored the pole position.

Ryan Blaney scored the pole for the race with a time of 26.932 and a speed of 200.505 mph (322.682 km/h).

=== Qualifying results ===
Pos	No.	Driver	Team	Manufacturer	R1	R2	R3
1	12	Ryan Blaney	Team Penske	Ford	27.043	27.182	26.932
2	14	Clint Bowyer	Stewart–Haas Racing	Ford	27.220	27.188	26.969
3	4	Kevin Harvick	Stewart–Haas Racing	Ford	27.115	27.068	27.008
4	10	Aric Almirola	Stewart–Haas Racing	Ford	27.251	27.277	27.030
5	2	Brad Keselowski	Team Penske	Ford	27.361	27.273	27.064
6	11	Denny Hamlin	Joe Gibbs Racing	Toyota	27.488	27.162	27.101
7	41	Kurt Busch	Stewart–Haas Racing	Ford	27.201	27.070	27.105
8	22	Joey Logano	Team Penske	Ford	27.302	26.964	27.124
9	24	William Byron (R)	Hendrick Motorsports	Chevrolet	27.273	27.181	27.126
10	18	Kyle Busch	Joe Gibbs Racing	Toyota	27.187	27.142	27.176
11	21	Paul Menard	Wood Brothers Racing	Ford	27.428	27.262	27.279
12	20	Erik Jones	Joe Gibbs Racing	Toyota	27.276	27.130	27.293
13	78	Martin Truex Jr.	Furniture Row Racing	Toyota	27.396	27.278	—
14	31	Ryan Newman	Richard Childress Racing	Chevrolet	27.451	27.283	—
15	6	Trevor Bayne	Roush Fenway Racing	Ford	27.544	27.312	—
16	9	Chase Elliott	Hendrick Motorsports	Chevrolet	27.506	27.316	—
17	17	Ricky Stenhouse Jr.	Roush Fenway Racing	Ford	27.425	27.329	—
18	88	Alex Bowman	Hendrick Motorsports	Chevrolet	27.505	27.336	—
19	19	Daniel Suárez	Joe Gibbs Racing	Toyota	27.441	27.356	—
20	1	Jamie McMurray	Chip Ganassi Racing	Chevrolet	27.313	27.358	—
21	37	Chris Buescher	JTG Daugherty Racing	Chevrolet	27.364	27.399	—
22	42	Kyle Larson	Chip Ganassi Racing	Chevrolet	27.538	27.437	—
23	48	Jimmie Johnson	Hendrick Motorsports	Chevrolet	27.418	27.449	—
24	13	Ty Dillon	Germain Racing	Chevrolet	27.519	27.479	—
25	47	A. J. Allmendinger	JTG Daugherty Racing	Chevrolet	27.550	—	—
26	3	Austin Dillon	Richard Childress Racing	Chevrolet	27.646	—	—
27	38	David Ragan	Front Row Motorsports	Ford	27.661	—	—
28	95	Regan Smith	Leavine Family Racing	Chevrolet	27.728	—	—
29	34	Michael McDowell	Front Row Motorsports	Ford	27.767	—	—
30	43	Bubba Wallace (R)	Richard Petty Motorsports	Chevrolet	27.778	—	—
31	32	Matt DiBenedetto	Go Fas Racing	Ford	28.066	—	—
32	00	Landon Cassill (i)	StarCom Racing	Chevrolet	28.148	—	—
33	15	Ross Chastain (i)	Premium Motorsports	Chevrolet	28.228	—	—
34	96	Parker Kligerman (i)	Gaunt Brothers Racing	Toyota	28.256	—	—
35	23	J. J. Yeley (i)	BK Racing	Toyota	28.381	—	—
36	99	Kyle Weatherman	StarCom Racing	Chevrolet	28.598	—	—
37	72	Corey LaJoie	TriStar Motorsports	Chevrolet	28.598	—	—
38	7	Reed Sorenson (i)	Premium Motorsports	Chevrolet	28.785	—	—
39	51	Joey Gase (i)	Rick Ware Racing	Ford	29.496	—	—
40	97	David Starr (i)	Obaika Racing	Toyota	29.784	—	—
Did not qualify
41	66	Timmy Hill (i)	MBM Motorsports	Toyota	0.000	—	—
Official qualifying results

== Practice (post-qualifying) ==
=== Second practice ===
Aric Almirola was the fastest in the second practice session with a time of 27.856 seconds and a speed of 193.854 mph (311.978 km/h).

Pos	No.	Driver	Team	Manufacturer	Time	Speed
1	10	Aric Almirola	Stewart–Haas Racing	Ford	27.856	193.854
2	18	Kyle Busch	Joe Gibbs Racing	Toyota	27.863	193.805
3	14	Clint Bowyer	Stewart–Haas Racing	Ford	27.868	193.771
Official second practice results

=== Final practice ===
Ricky Stenhouse Jr. was the fastest in the final practice session with a time of 28.074 seconds and a speed of 192.349 mph (309.556 km/h).

Pos	No.	Driver	Team	Manufacturer	Time	Speed
1	17	Ricky Stenhouse Jr.	Roush–Fenway Racing	Ford	28.074	192.349
2	41	Kurt Busch	Stewart–Haas Racing	Ford	28.114	192.075
3	78	Martin Truex Jr.	Furniture Row Racing	Toyota	28.142	191.884
Official final practice results

== Race ==
=== Stage results ===
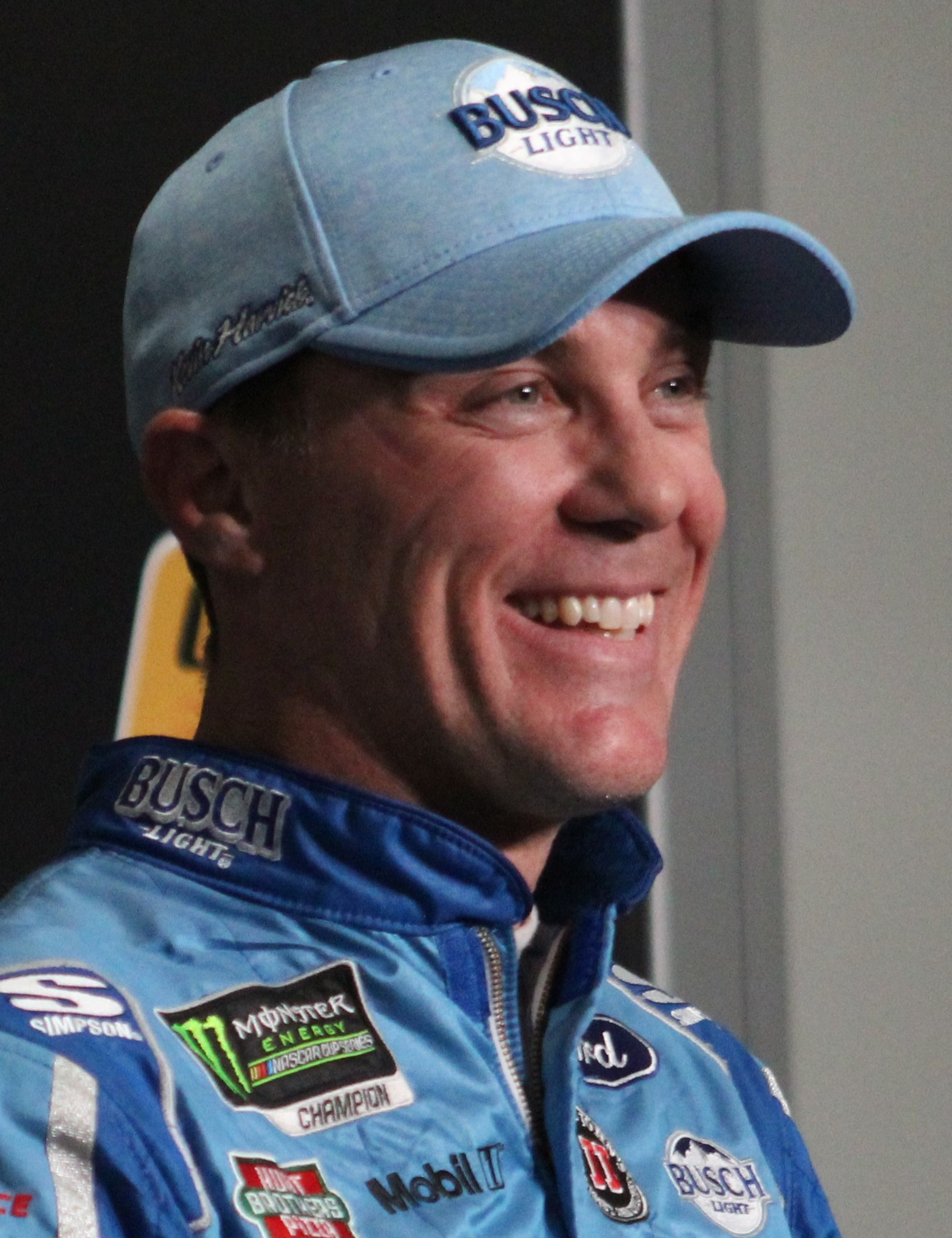
Kevin Harvick swept all three stages and won the race, but failed post-race inspection.

Stage 1 Laps: 85

Pos	No	Driver	Team	Manufacturer	Points
1	4	Kevin Harvick	Stewart–Haas Racing	Ford	10
2	41	Kurt Busch	Stewart–Haas Racing	Ford	9
3	20	Erik Jones	Joe Gibbs Racing	Toyota	8
4	12	Ryan Blaney	Team Penske	Ford	7
5	78	Martin Truex Jr.	Furniture Row Racing	Toyota	6
6	22	Joey Logano	Team Penske	Ford	5
7	18	Kyle Busch	Joe Gibbs Racing	Toyota	4
8	21	Paul Menard	Wood Brothers Racing	Ford	3
9	9	Chase Elliott	Hendrick Motorsports	Chevrolet	2
10	10	Aric Almirola	Stewart–Haas Racing	Ford	1
Official stage one results

Stage 2 Laps: 85

Pos	No	Driver	Team	Manufacturer	Points
1	4	Kevin Harvick	Stewart–Haas Racing	Ford	10
2	12	Ryan Blaney	Team Penske	Ford	9
3	78	Martin Truex Jr.	Furniture Row Racing	Toyota	8
4	2	Brad Keselowski	Team Penske	Ford	7
5	22	Joey Logano	Team Penske	Ford	6
6	10	Aric Almirola	Stewart–Haas Racing	Ford	5
7	20	Erik Jones	Joe Gibbs Racing	Toyota	4
8	41	Kurt Busch	Stewart–Haas Racing	Ford	3
9	19	Daniel Suárez	Joe Gibbs Racing	Toyota	2
10	9	Chase Elliott	Hendrick Motorsports	Chevrolet	1
Official stage two results

=== Final stage results ===
Stage 3 Laps: 164

Pos	Grid	No	Driver	Team	Manufacturer	Laps	Points
1	3	4	Kevin Harvick	Stewart–Haas Racing	Ford	337	20 (Note: Harvick was penalized 40 points and the win is encumbered due to a spoiler infraction post-race.)
2	1	12	Ryan Blaney	Team Penske	Ford	337	31
3	8	22	Joey Logano	Team Penske	Ford	337	45
4	12	20	Erik Jones	Joe Gibbs Racing	Toyota	337	25
5	22	42	Kyle Larson	Chip Ganassi Racing	Chevrolet	337	32
6	16	9	Chase Elliott	Hendrick Motorsports	Chevrolet	337	34
7	7	41	Kurt Busch	Stewart–Haas Racing	Ford	337	42
8	4	10	Aric Almirola	Stewart–Haas Racing	Ford	337	35
9	13	78	Martin Truex Jr.	Furniture Row Racing	Toyota	337	42
10	26	3	Austin Dillon	Richard Childress Racing	Chevrolet	337	27
11	17	17	Ricky Stenhouse Jr.	Roush Fenway Racing	Ford	337	26
12	5	2	Brad Keselowski	Team Penske	Ford	337	32
13	11	21	Paul Menard	Wood Brothers Racing	Ford	337	27
14	18	88	Alex Bowman	Hendrick Motorsports	Chevrolet	337	23
15	23	48	Jimmie Johnson	Hendrick Motorsports	Chevrolet	337	22
16	9	24	William Byron (R)	Hendrick Motorsports	Chevrolet	337	21
17	10	18	Kyle Busch	Joe Gibbs Racing	Toyota	337	24
18	14	31	Ryan Newman	Richard Childress Racing	Chevrolet	335	19
19	20	1	Jamie McMurray	Chip Ganassi Racing	Chevrolet	335	18
20	25	47	A. J. Allmendinger	JTG Daugherty Racing	Chevrolet	335	17
21	15	6	Trevor Bayne	Roush Fenway Racing	Ford	335	16
22	24	13	Ty Dillon	Germain Racing	Chevrolet	335	15
23	21	37	Chris Buescher	JTG Daugherty Racing	Chevrolet	335	14
24	27	38	David Ragan	Front Row Motorsports	Ford	335	13
25	30	43	Bubba Wallace (R)	Richard Petty Motorsports	Chevrolet	335	12
26	2	14	Clint Bowyer	Stewart–Haas Racing	Ford	334	11
27	28	95	Regan Smith	Leavine Family Racing	Chevrolet	332	10
28	19	19	Daniel Suárez	Joe Gibbs Racing	Toyota	332	11
29	29	34	Michael McDowell	Front Row Motorsports	Ford	331	8
30	6	11	Denny Hamlin	Joe Gibbs Racing	Toyota	331	7
31	34	96	Parker Kligerman (i)	Gaunt Brothers Racing	Toyota	329	0
32	33	15	Ross Chastain (i)	Premium Motorsports	Chevrolet	326	0
33	38	7	Reed Sorenson (i)	Premium Motorsports	Chevrolet	326	0
34	36	99	Kyle Weatherman	StarCom Racing	Chevrolet	323	3
35	32	00	Landon Cassill (i)	StarCom Racing	Chevrolet	321	0
36	35	23	J. J. Yeley (i)	BK Racing	Toyota	321	0
37	39	51	Joey Gase (i)	Rick Ware Racing	Ford	317	0
38	31	32	Matt DiBenedetto	Go Fas Racing	Ford	300	1
39	40	97	David Starr (i)	Obaika Racing	Toyota	287	0
40	37	72	Corey LaJoie	TriStar Motorsports	Chevrolet	269	1
Official race results

=== Race statistics ===
- Lead changes: 16 among 7 different drivers
- Cautions/Laps: 8 for 37 laps
- Red flags: 0
- Time of race: 3 hours, 21 minutes and 27 seconds
- Average speed: 150.558 miles per hour (242.300 km/h)

== Media ==
=== Television ===
NBC Sports covered the race on the television side. Rick Allen, two-time Texas winner Jeff Burton, Steve Letarte and 2000 Texas winner Dale Earnhardt Jr. called the race from the broadcast booth, while Dave Burns, Marty Snider and Kelli Stavast reported from pit lane.

NBCSN
Booth announcers	Pit reporters
Lap-by-lap: Rick Allen; Color commentator: Jeff Burton; Color commentator: Steve Letarte; Color commentator: Dale Earnhardt Jr.	Dave Burns; Marty Snider; Kelli Stavast

=== Radio ===
PRN had the radio call for the race, which was simulcast on SiriusXM's NASCAR Radio channel.

PRN
Booth announcers	Turn announcers	Pit reporters
Lead announcer: Doug Rice; Announcer: Mark Garrow	Turns 1 & 2: Rob Albright; Turns 3 & 4: Pat Patterson	Brad Gillie; Brett McMillan; Wendy Venturini; Steve Richards

== Standings after the race ==
	Pos	Driver	Points
	1	Kyle Busch	4,128
	2	Martin Truex Jr.	4,125 (−3)
1	3	Joey Logano	4,119 (−6)
1	4	Kevin Harvick	4,103 (−25)
	5	Kurt Busch	4,100 (−28)
	6	Chase Elliott	4,086 (−42)
1	7	Aric Almirola	4,068 (−60)
1	8	Clint Bowyer	4,052 (−76)
	9	Ryan Blaney	2,283 (−1,845)
	10	Brad Keselowski	2,259 (−1,869)
	11	Denny Hamlin	2,220 (−1,908)
	12	Kyle Larson	2,211 (−1,917)
2	13	Erik Jones	2,204 (−1,924)
1	14	Jimmie Johnson	2,195 (−1,933)
1	15	Alex Bowman	2,187 (−1,941)
	16	Austin Dillon	2,184 (−1,944)
Official driver's standings

Manufacturers' Championship standings

Pos	Manufacturer	Points
1	Ford	1,235
2	Toyota	1,211 (−24)
3	Chevrolet	1,123 (−112)
Official manufacturers' standings

- Note: Only the first 16 positions are included for the driver standings.

== Notes ==
Previous race: 2018 First Data 500	Monster Energy NASCAR Cup Series; 2018 season	Next race: 2018 Can-Am 500
