= 2018 Can-Am 500 =

Race details
- Race 35 of 36 in the 2018 Monster Energy NASCAR Cup Series
- Date: November 11, 2018
- Location: ISM Raceway in Avondale, Arizona
- Course: Permanent racing facility
- Course length: 1 miles (1.6 km)
- Distance: 312 laps, 312 mi (499.2 km)
- Average speed: 98.354 miles per hour (158.285 km/h)

Pole position
Driver	Kevin Harvick	Stewart–Haas Racing
- Time: 25.836

Most laps led
Driver	Kyle Busch	Joe Gibbs Racing
- Laps: 117

Winner
No. 18	Kyle Busch	Joe Gibbs Racing

Television in the United States
- Network: NBC
- Announcers: Rick Allen, Jeff Burton, Steve Letarte and Dale Earnhardt Jr.
- Nielsen ratings: 2.0/2.1 (Overnight)

Radio in the United States
- Radio: MRN
- Booth announcers: Joe Moore, Jeff Striegle and Rusty Wallace
- Turn announcers: Kyle Rickey (1 & 2) and Buddy Long (3 & 4)

The 2018 Can-Am 500 was a Monster Energy NASCAR Cup Series race that was held on November 11, 2018, at ISM Raceway in Avondale, Arizona. Contested over 312 laps on the one mile (1.6 km) oval, it was the 35th race of the 2018 Monster Energy NASCAR Cup Series season, ninth race of the Playoffs, and final race of the Round of 8.

== Report ==
=== Background ===
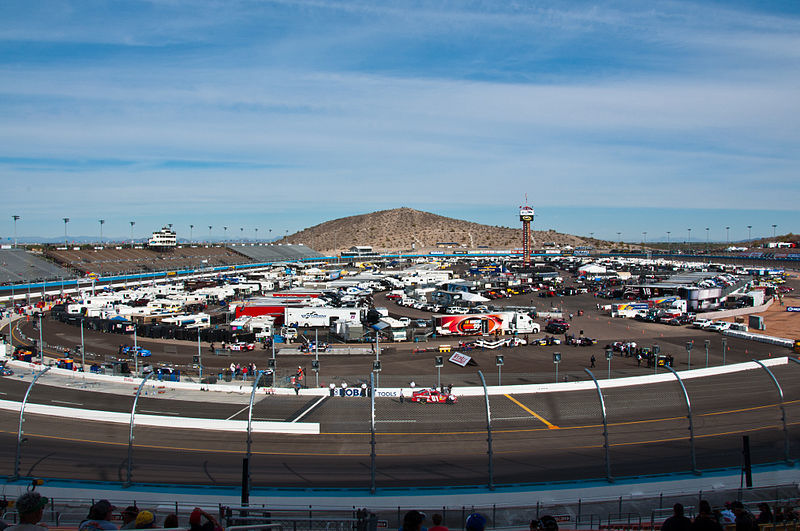
ISM Raceway, the track where the race was held.

ISM Raceway – also known as PIR – is a one-mile, low-banked tri-oval race track located in Avondale, Arizona. It is named after the nearby metropolitan area of Phoenix. The motorsport track opened in 1964 and currently hosts two NASCAR race weekends annually. The raceway is currently owned and operated by NASCAR.

The raceway was originally constructed with a 2.5 mi (4.0 km) road course that ran both inside and outside of the main tri-oval. In 1991 the track was reconfigured with the current 1.51 mi (2.43 km) interior layout. PIR has an estimated grandstand seating capacity of around 67,000. Lights were installed around the track in 2004 following the addition of a second annual NASCAR race weekend.

ISM Raceway is home to two annual NASCAR race weekends, one of 13 facilities on the NASCAR schedule to host more than one race weekend a year. The track is both the first and last stop in the western United States, as well as the fourth and penultimate track on the schedule.

==== Entry list ====
No.	Driver	Team	Manufacturer
00	Landon Cassill (i)	StarCom Racing	Chevrolet
1	Jamie McMurray	Chip Ganassi Racing	Chevrolet
2	Brad Keselowski	Team Penske	Ford
3	Austin Dillon	Richard Childress Racing	Chevrolet
4	Kevin Harvick	Stewart–Haas Racing	Ford
6	Matt Kenseth	Roush–Fenway Racing	Ford
7	D. J. Kennington (i)	Premium Motorsports	Chevrolet
9	Chase Elliott	Hendrick Motorsports	Chevrolet
10	Aric Almirola	Stewart–Haas Racing	Ford
11	Denny Hamlin	Joe Gibbs Racing	Toyota
12	Ryan Blaney	Team Penske	Ford
13	Ty Dillon	Germain Racing	Chevrolet
14	Clint Bowyer	Stewart–Haas Racing	Ford
15	Ross Chastain (i)	Premium Motorsports	Chevrolet
17	Ricky Stenhouse Jr.	Roush–Fenway Racing	Ford
18	Kyle Busch	Joe Gibbs Racing	Toyota
19	Daniel Suárez	Joe Gibbs Racing	Toyota
20	Erik Jones	Joe Gibbs Racing	Toyota
21	Paul Menard	Wood Brothers Racing	Ford
22	Joey Logano	Team Penske	Ford
23	J. J. Yeley (i)	BK Racing	Toyota
24	William Byron (R)	Hendrick Motorsports	Chevrolet
31	Ryan Newman	Richard Childress Racing	Chevrolet
32	Matt DiBenedetto	Go Fas Racing	Ford
34	Michael McDowell	Front Row Motorsports	Ford
37	Chris Buescher	JTG Daugherty Racing	Chevrolet
38	David Ragan	Front Row Motorsports	Ford
41	Kurt Busch	Stewart–Haas Racing	Ford
42	Kyle Larson	Chip Ganassi Racing	Chevrolet
43	Bubba Wallace (R)	Richard Petty Motorsports	Chevrolet
47	A. J. Allmendinger	JTG Daugherty Racing	Chevrolet
48	Jimmie Johnson	Hendrick Motorsports	Chevrolet
51	Cody Ware	Rick Ware Racing	Chevrolet
66	Timmy Hill (i)	MBM Motorsports	Toyota
72	Cole Whitt	TriStar Motorsports	Chevrolet
78	Martin Truex Jr.	Furniture Row Racing	Toyota
88	Alex Bowman	Hendrick Motorsports	Chevrolet
95	Regan Smith	Leavine Family Racing	Chevrolet
97	Tanner Berryhill	Obaika Racing	Toyota
Official entry list

== First practice ==
Erik Jones was the fastest in the first practice session with a time of 26.113 seconds and a speed of 137.862 mph (221.867 km/h).

Pos	No.	Driver	Team	Manufacturer	Time	Speed
1	20	Erik Jones	Joe Gibbs Racing	Toyota	26.113	137.862
2	18	Kyle Busch	Joe Gibbs Racing	Toyota	26.120	137.825
3	9	Chase Elliott	Hendrick Motorsports	Chevrolet	26.122	137.815
Official first practice results

== Qualifying ==
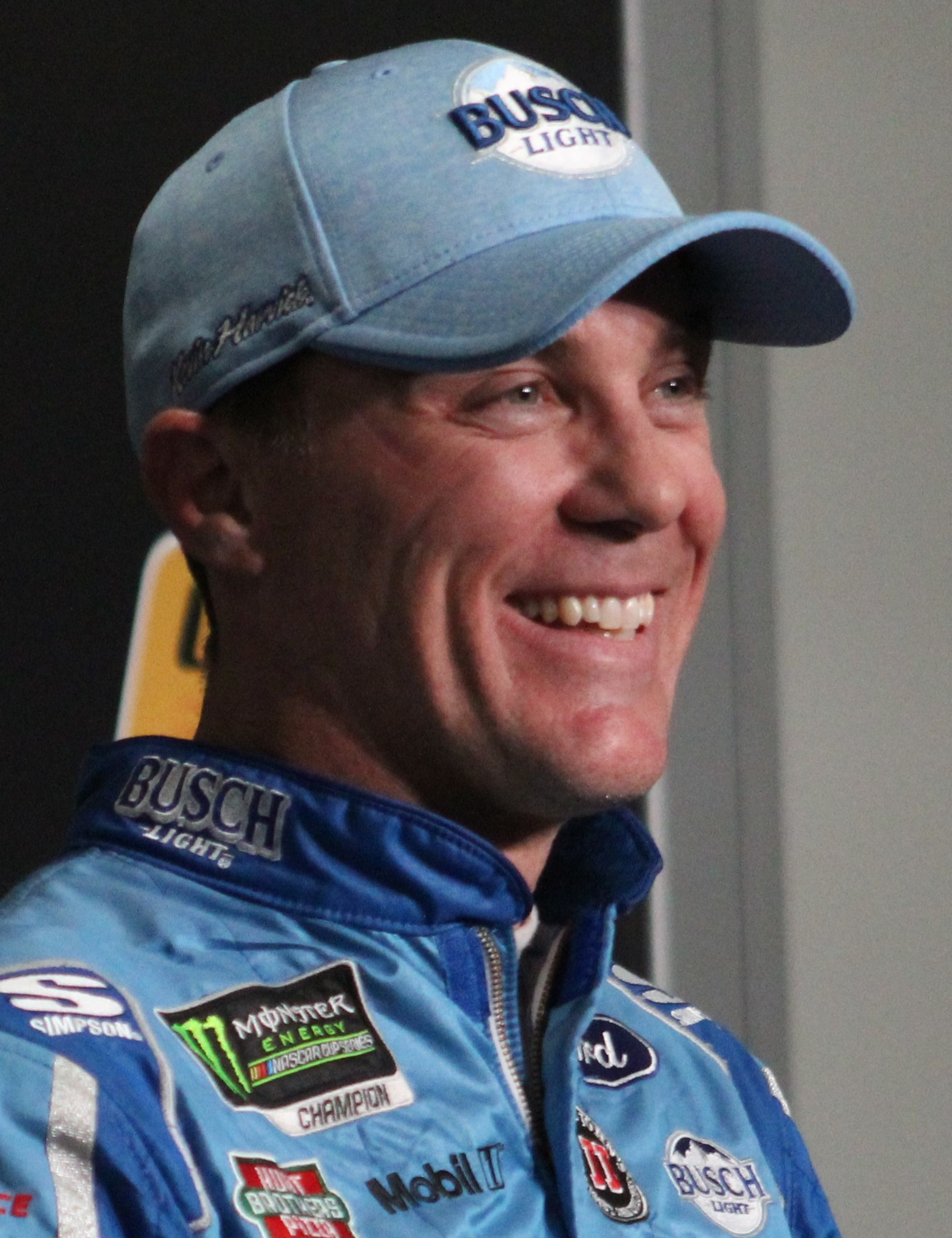
Kevin Harvick scored the pole position.

Kevin Harvick scored the pole for the race with a time of 25.836 and a speed of 139.340 mph (224.246 km/h).

=== Qualifying results ===
Pos	No.	Driver	Team	Manufacturer	R1	R2	R3
1	4	Kevin Harvick	Stewart–Haas Racing	Ford	26.158	25.998	25.836
2	9	Chase Elliott	Hendrick Motorsports	Chevrolet	26.257	25.823	25.871
3	17	Ricky Stenhouse Jr.	Roush–Fenway Racing	Ford	26.176	26.017	25.898
4	12	Ryan Blaney	Team Penske	Ford	26.317	26.011	25.924
5	88	Alex Bowman	Hendrick Motorsports	Chevrolet	26.335	25.979	25.948
6	18	Kyle Busch	Joe Gibbs Racing	Toyota	26.176	25.889	25.954
7	20	Erik Jones	Joe Gibbs Racing	Toyota	26.201	25.981	26.022
8	42	Kyle Larson	Chip Ganassi Racing	Chevrolet	26.226	25.887	26.038
9	22	Joey Logano	Team Penske	Ford	26.183	26.020	26.039
10	11	Denny Hamlin	Joe Gibbs Racing	Toyota	26.253	25.926	26.040
11	21	Paul Menard	Wood Brothers Racing	Ford	26.228	25.958	26.108
12	2	Brad Keselowski	Team Penske	Ford	26.199	26.019	26.150
13	78	Martin Truex Jr.	Furniture Row Racing	Toyota	26.290	26.023	—
14	41	Kurt Busch	Stewart–Haas Racing	Ford	26.174	26.053	—
15	3	Austin Dillon	Richard Childress Racing	Chevrolet	26.099	26.074	—
16	14	Clint Bowyer	Stewart–Haas Racing	Ford	26.244	26.110	—
17	6	Matt Kenseth	Roush–Fenway Racing	Ford	26.028	26.131	—
18	10	Aric Almirola	Stewart–Haas Racing	Ford	26.282	26.140	—
19	24	William Byron (R)	Hendrick Motorsports	Chevrolet	26.195	26.162	—
20	48	Jimmie Johnson	Hendrick Motorsports	Chevrolet	26.234	26.174	—
21	1	Jamie McMurray	Chip Ganassi Racing	Chevrolet	26.232	26.176	—
22	31	Ryan Newman	Richard Childress Racing	Chevrolet	26.255	26.212	—
23	34	Michael McDowell	Front Row Motorsports	Ford	26.231	26.313	—
24	47	A. J. Allmendinger	JTG Daugherty Racing	Chevrolet	26.321	26.368	—
25	37	Chris Buescher	JTG Daugherty Racing	Chevrolet	26.342	—	—
26	19	Daniel Suárez	Joe Gibbs Racing	Toyota	26.368	—	—
27	32	Matt DiBenedetto	Go Fas Racing	Ford	26.487	—	—
28	13	Ty Dillon	Germain Racing	Chevrolet	26.516	—	—
29	95	Regan Smith	Leavine Family Racing	Chevrolet	26.539	—	—
30	43	Bubba Wallace (R)	Richard Petty Motorsports	Chevrolet	26.560	—	—
31	38	David Ragan	Front Row Motorsports	Ford	26.614	—	—
32	00	Landon Cassill (i)	StarCom Racing	Chevrolet	26.834	—	—
33	15	Ross Chastain (i)	Premium Motorsports	Chevrolet	26.970	—	—
34	72	Cole Whitt	TriStar Motorsports	Chevrolet	27.001	—	—
35	23	J. J. Yeley (i)	BK Racing	Toyota	27.010	—	—
36	97	Tanner Berryhill	Obaika Racing	Toyota	27.231	—	—
37	66	Timmy Hill (i)	MBM Motorsports	Toyota	27.457	—	—
38	7	D. J. Kennington (i)	Premium Motorsports	Chevrolet	27.666	—	—
39	51	Cody Ware	Rick Ware Racing	Chevrolet	0.000	—	—
Official qualifying results

== Practice (post-qualifying) ==
=== Second practice ===
Kevin Harvick was the fastest in the second practice session with a time of 26.724 seconds and a speed of 134.710 mph (216.795 km/h).

Pos	No.	Driver	Team	Manufacturer	Time	Speed
1	4	Kevin Harvick	Stewart–Haas Racing	Ford	26.724	134.710
2	42	Kyle Larson	Chip Ganassi Racing	Chevrolet	26.730	134.680
3	2	Brad Keselowski	Team Penske	Ford	26.770	134.479
Official second practice results

=== Final practice ===
Kevin Harvick was the fastest in the final practice session with a time of 26.642 seconds and a speed of 135.125 mph (217.463 km/h).

Pos	No.	Driver	Team	Manufacturer	Time	Speed
1	4	Kevin Harvick	Stewart–Haas Racing	Ford	26.642	135.125
2	2	Brad Keselowski	Team Penske	Ford	26.769	134.484
3	18	Kyle Busch	Joe Gibbs Racing	Toyota	26.804	134.308
Official final practice results

== Race ==
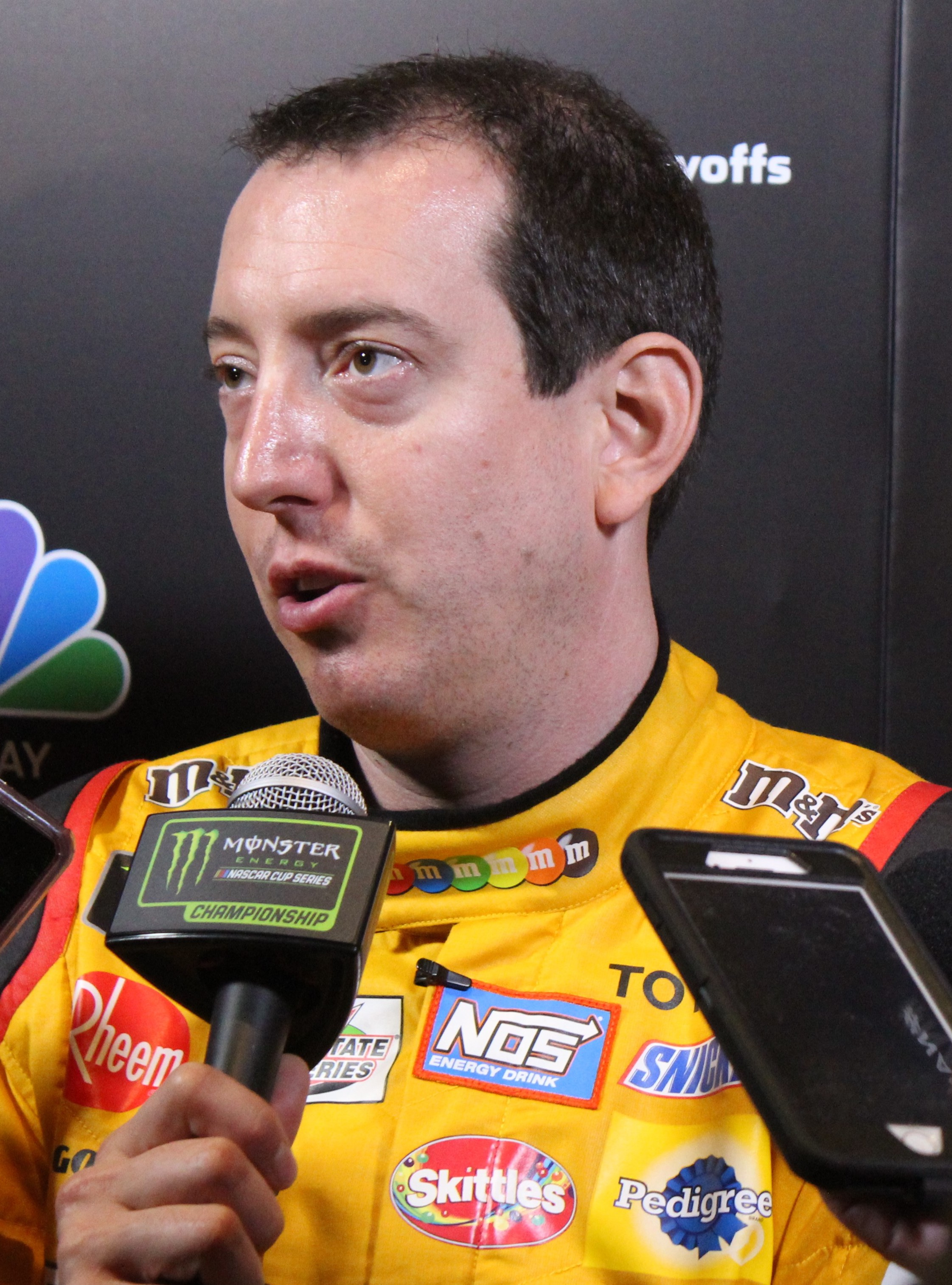
Kyle Busch won the race.

=== Stage Results ===
Stage 1 Laps: 75

Pos	No	Driver	Team	Manufacturer	Points
1	9	Chase Elliott	Hendrick Motorsports	Chevrolet	10
2	12	Ryan Blaney	Team Penske	Ford	9
3	11	Denny Hamlin	Joe Gibbs Racing	Toyota	8
4	41	Kurt Busch	Stewart–Haas Racing	Ford	7
5	2	Brad Keselowski	Team Penske	Ford	6
6	42	Kyle Larson	Chip Ganassi Racing	Chevrolet	5
7	18	Kyle Busch	Joe Gibbs Racing	Toyota	4
8	20	Erik Jones	Joe Gibbs Racing	Toyota	3
9	88	Alex Bowman	Hendrick Motorsports	Chevrolet	2
10	3	Austin Dillon	Richard Childress Racing	Chevrolet	1
Official stage one results

Stage 2 Laps: 75

Pos	No	Driver	Team	Manufacturer	Points
1	18	Kyle Busch	Joe Gibbs Racing	Toyota	10
2	2	Brad Keselowski	Team Penske	Ford	9
3	78	Martin Truex Jr.	Furniture Row Racing	Toyota	8
4	4	Kevin Harvick	Stewart–Haas Racing	Ford	7
5	42	Kyle Larson	Chip Ganassi Racing	Chevrolet	6
6	3	Austin Dillon	Richard Childress Racing	Chevrolet	5
7	9	Chase Elliott	Hendrick Motorsports	Chevrolet	4
8	12	Ryan Blaney	Team Penske	Ford	3
9	24	William Byron (R)	Hendrick Motorsports	Chevrolet	2
10	10	Aric Almirola	Stewart–Haas Racing	Ford	1
Official stage two results

=== Final Stage Results ===
Stage 3 Laps: 162

Pos	Grid	No	Driver	Team	Manufacturer	Laps	Points
1	6	18	Kyle Busch	Joe Gibbs Racing	Toyota	312	54
2	12	2	Brad Keselowski	Team Penske	Ford	312	50
3	8	42	Kyle Larson	Chip Ganassi Racing	Chevrolet	312	45
4	18	10	Aric Almirola	Stewart–Haas Racing	Ford	312	34
5	1	4	Kevin Harvick	Stewart–Haas Racing	Ford	312	39
6	21	1	Jamie McMurray	Chip Ganassi Racing	Chevrolet	312	31
7	17	6	Matt Kenseth	Roush–Fenway Racing	Ford	312	30
8	15	3	Austin Dillon	Richard Childress Racing	Chevrolet	312	35
9	19	24	William Byron (R)	Hendrick Motorsports	Chevrolet	312	30
10	30	43	Bubba Wallace (R)	Richard Petty Motorsports	Chevrolet	312	27
11	22	31	Ryan Newman	Richard Childress Racing	Chevrolet	312	26
12	24	47	A. J. Allmendinger	JTG Daugherty Racing	Chevrolet	312	25
13	10	11	Denny Hamlin	Joe Gibbs Racing	Toyota	312	32
14	13	78	Martin Truex Jr.	Furniture Row Racing	Toyota	312	31
15	20	48	Jimmie Johnson	Hendrick Motorsports	Chevrolet	312	22
16	23	34	Michael McDowell	Front Row Motorsports	Ford	311	21
17	7	20	Erik Jones	Joe Gibbs Racing	Toyota	310	23
18	25	37	Chris Buescher	JTG Daugherty Racing	Chevrolet	310	19
19	28	13	Ty Dillon	Germain Racing	Chevrolet	310	18
20	31	38	David Ragan	Front Row Motorsports	Ford	310	17
21	27	32	Matt DiBenedetto	Go Fas Racing	Ford	310	16
22	29	95	Regan Smith	Leavine Family Racing	Chevrolet	310	15
23	2	9	Chase Elliott	Hendrick Motorsports	Chevrolet	309	28
24	33	15	Ross Chastain (i)	Premium Motorsports	Chevrolet	309	0
25	34	72	Cole Whitt	TriStar Motorsports	Chevrolet	309	12
26	32	00	Landon Cassill (i)	StarCom Racing	Chevrolet	308	0
27	38	7	D. J. Kennington (i)	Premium Motorsports	Chevrolet	306	0
28	39	51	Cody Ware	Rick Ware Racing	Chevrolet	306	9
29	11	21	Paul Menard	Wood Brothers Racing	Ford	303	8
30	5	88	Alex Bowman	Hendrick Motorsports	Chevrolet	285	9
31	36	97	Tanner Berryhill	Obaika Racing	Toyota	283	6
32	14	41	Kurt Busch	Stewart–Haas Racing	Ford	272	12
33	3	17	Ricky Stenhouse Jr.	Roush–Fenway Racing	Ford	262	4
34	4	12	Ryan Blaney	Team Penske	Ford	237	15
35	16	14	Clint Bowyer	Stewart–Haas Racing	Ford	133	2
36	26	19	Daniel Suárez	Joe Gibbs Racing	Toyota	96	1
37	9	22	Joey Logano	Team Penske	Ford	95	1
38	35	23	J. J. Yeley (i)	BK Racing	Toyota	88	0
39	37	66	Timmy Hill (i)	MBM Motorsports	Toyota	40	0
Official race results

=== Race statistics ===
- Lead changes: 8 among different drivers
- Cautions/Laps: 10 for 61
- Red flags: 1 for 16 minutes and 24 seconds
- Time of race: 3 hours, 10 minutes and 20 seconds
- Average speed: 98.354 miles per hour (158.285 km/h)

== Media ==
=== Television ===
NBC Sports covered the race on the television side. Rick Allen, two–time Phoenix winner Jeff Burton, Steve Letarte and three-time Phoenix winner Dale Earnhardt Jr. had the call in the booth for the race. Dave Burns, Parker Kligerman, Marty Snider and Kelli Stavast reported from pit lane during the race.

NBC
Booth announcers	Pit reporters
Lap-by-lap: Rick Allen; Color-commentator: Jeff Burton; Color-commentator: Steve Letarte; Color-commentator: Dale Earnhardt Jr.	Dave Burns; Parker Kligerman; Marty Snider; Kelli Stavast

=== Radio ===
MRN had the radio call for the race, which was simulcast on SiriusXM's NASCAR Radio.

MRN
Booth announcers	Turn announcers	Pit reporters
Lead announcer: Joe Moore; Announcer: Jeff Striegle; Announcer: Rusty Wallace	Turns 1 & 2: Dan Hubbard; Turns 3 & 4: Kyle Rickey	Alex Hayden; Winston Kelley; Steve Post; Kim Coon

== Standings after the race ==
	Pos	Driver	Points
2	1	Joey Logano	5,000
1	2	Kyle Busch	5,000 (–0)
1	3	Martin Truex Jr.	5,000 (–0)
	4	Kevin Harvick	5,000 (–0)
1	5	Chase Elliott	2,320 (–2,680)
1	6	Kurt Busch	2,318 (–2,682)
	7	Aric Almirola	2,316 (–2,684)
2	8	Brad Keselowski	2,309 (–2,691)
	9	Ryan Blaney	2,278 (–2,722)
2	10	Kyle Larson	2,256 (–2,744)
	11	Denny Hamlin	2,252 (–2,748)
4	12	Clint Bowyer	2,242 (–2,758)
3	13	Austin Dillon	2,219 (–2,781)
	14	Jimmie Johnson	2,217 (–2,783)
2	15	Erik Jones	2,207 (–2,793)
1	16	Alex Bowman	2,196 (–2,804)
Official driver's standings

Manufacturers' Championship standings

Pos	Manufacturer	Points
1	Ford	1,270
2	Toyota	1,251 (–19)
3	Chevrolet	1,157 (–113)
Official manufacturers' standings

- Note: Only the first 16 positions are included for the driver standings.

Previous race: 2018 AAA Texas 500	Monster Energy NASCAR Cup Series; 2018 season	Next race: 2018 Ford EcoBoost 400
