= 2018 First Data 500 =

Race details
- Race 33 of 36 in the 2018 Monster Energy NASCAR Cup Series
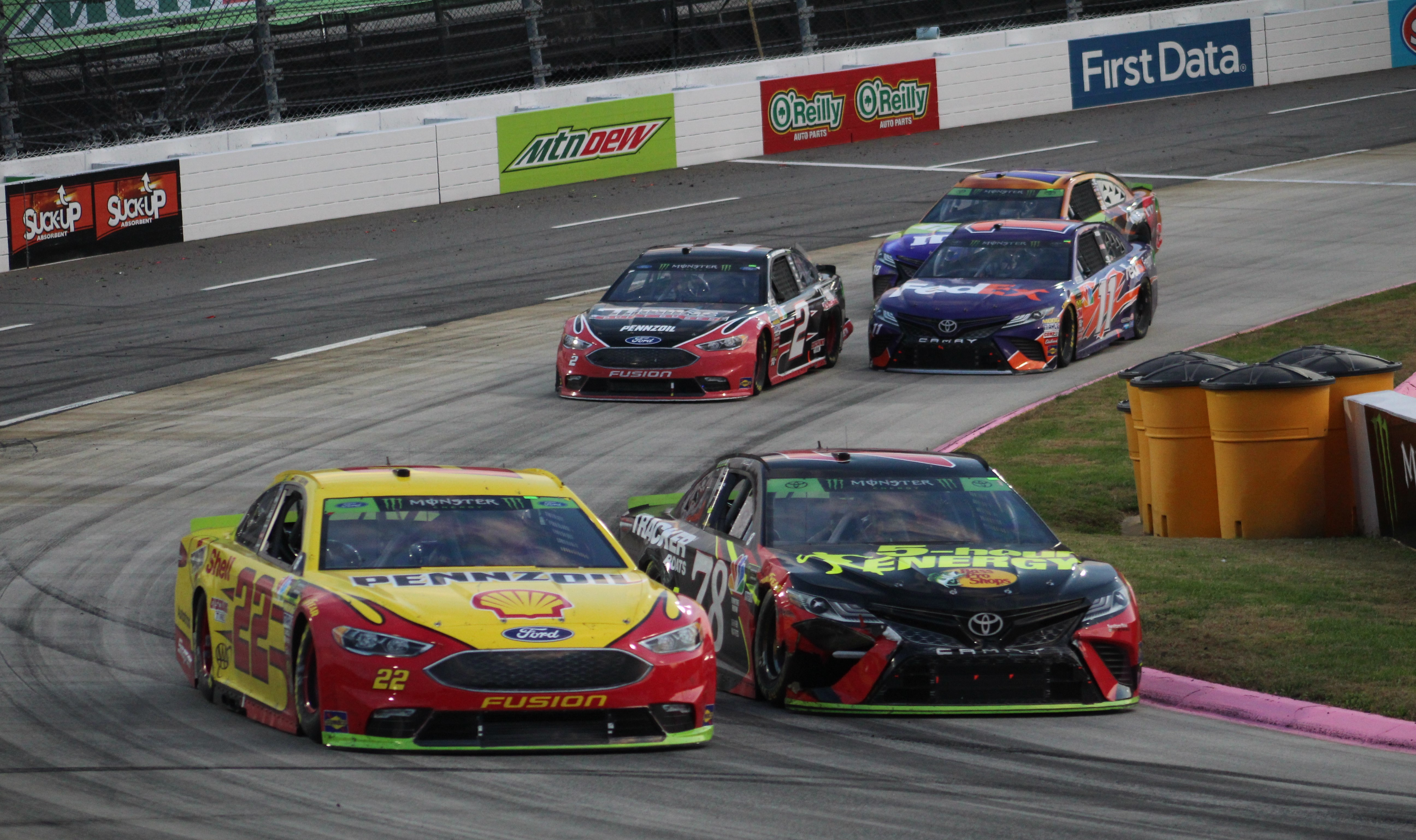
- Date: October 28, 2018
- Location: Martinsville Speedway in Ridgeway, Virginia
- Course: Permanent racing facility
- Course length: .526 miles (.847 km)
- Distance: 500 laps, 263 mi (423.5 km)
- Average speed: 75.310 miles per hour (121.200 km/h)

Pole position
Driver	Kyle Busch	Joe Gibbs Racing
- Time: 19.673

Most laps led
Driver	Joey Logano	Team Penske
- Laps: 309

Winner
No. 22	Joey Logano	Team Penske

Television in the United States
- Network: NBCSN
- Announcers: Rick Allen, Jeff Burton, Steve Letarte and Dale Earnhardt Jr.
- Nielsen ratings: 1.3 (Overnight)

Radio in the United States
- Radio: MRN
- Booth announcers: Joe Moore, Jeff Striegle and Rusty Wallace
- Turn announcers: Dave Moody (Backstretch)

The 2018 First Data 500 was a Monster Energy NASCAR Cup Series race held on October 28, 2018, at Martinsville Speedway in Ridgeway, Virginia. Contested over 500 laps on the .526 mile (.847 km) short track (extended from 500 laps), it was the 33rd race of the 2018 Monster Energy NASCAR Cup Series season, seventh race of the Playoffs, and first race of the Round of 8.

== Report ==
=== Background ===
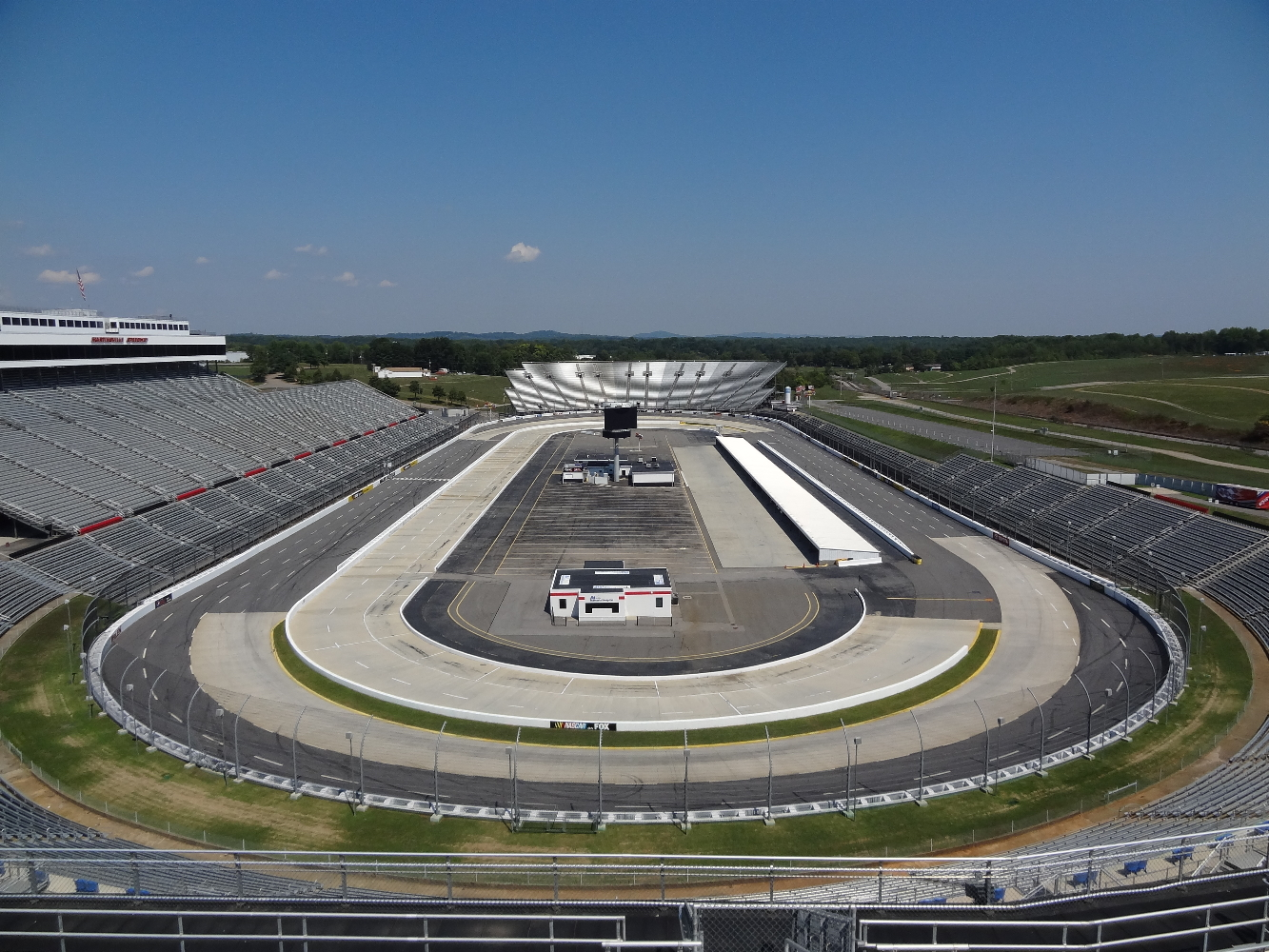
Martinsville Speedway, the track where the race was held.

Martinsville Speedway is an International Speedway Corporation-owned NASCAR stock car racing track located in Ridgeway, Virginia. At 0.526 miles (0.847 km) in length, it is the shortest track in the NASCAR Monster Energy Cup Series. The track is also one of the first paved oval tracks in NASCAR, being built in 1947 by H. Clay Earles. It is also the only race track that has been on the NASCAR circuit from its beginning in 1948. Along with this, Martinsville is the only NASCAR oval track on the entire NASCAR track circuit to have asphalt surfaces on the straightaways, then concrete to cover the turns.

==== Entry list ====
No.	Driver	Team	Manufacturer
00	Joey Gase (i)	StarCom Racing	Chevrolet
1	Jamie McMurray	Chip Ganassi Racing	Chevrolet
2	Brad Keselowski	Team Penske	Ford
3	Austin Dillon	Richard Childress Racing	Chevrolet
4	Kevin Harvick	Stewart–Haas Racing	Ford
6	Matt Kenseth	Roush–Fenway Racing	Ford
7	Hermie Sadler	Premium Motorsports	Chevrolet
9	Chase Elliott	Hendrick Motorsports	Chevrolet
10	Aric Almirola	Stewart–Haas Racing	Ford
11	Denny Hamlin	Joe Gibbs Racing	Toyota
12	Ryan Blaney	Team Penske	Ford
13	Ty Dillon	Germain Racing	Chevrolet
14	Clint Bowyer	Stewart–Haas Racing	Ford
15	Ross Chastain (i)	Premium Motorsports	Chevrolet
17	Ricky Stenhouse Jr.	Roush–Fenway Racing	Ford
18	Kyle Busch	Joe Gibbs Racing	Toyota
19	Daniel Suárez	Joe Gibbs Racing	Toyota
20	Erik Jones	Joe Gibbs Racing	Toyota
21	Paul Menard	Wood Brothers Racing	Ford
22	Joey Logano	Team Penske	Ford
23	J. J. Yeley (i)	BK Racing	Toyota
24	William Byron (R)	Hendrick Motorsports	Chevrolet
31	Ryan Newman	Richard Childress Racing	Chevrolet
32	Matt DiBenedetto	Go Fas Racing	Ford
34	Michael McDowell	Front Row Motorsports	Ford
37	Chris Buescher	JTG Daugherty Racing	Chevrolet
38	David Ragan	Front Row Motorsports	Ford
41	Kurt Busch	Stewart–Haas Racing	Ford
42	Kyle Larson	Chip Ganassi Racing	Chevrolet
43	Bubba Wallace (R)	Richard Petty Motorsports	Chevrolet
47	A. J. Allmendinger	JTG Daugherty Racing	Chevrolet
48	Jimmie Johnson	Hendrick Motorsports	Chevrolet
51	Jeb Burton (i)	Rick Ware Racing	Chevrolet
66	Timmy Hill (i)	MBM Motorsports	Toyota
72	Cole Whitt	TriStar Motorsports	Chevrolet
78	Martin Truex Jr.	Furniture Row Racing	Toyota
88	Alex Bowman	Hendrick Motorsports	Chevrolet
95	Regan Smith	Leavine Family Racing	Chevrolet
96	D. J. Kennington (i)	Gaunt Brothers Racing	Toyota
99	Landon Cassill (i)	StarCom Racing	Chevrolet
Official entry list

== Practice ==
=== First practice ===
Brad Keselowski was the fastest in the first practice session with a time of 19.784 seconds and a speed of 95.714 mph (154.037 km/h).

Pos	No.	Driver	Team	Manufacturer	Time	Speed
1	2	Brad Keselowski	Team Penske	Ford	19.784	95.714
2	41	Kurt Busch	Stewart–Haas Racing	Ford	19.798	95.646
3	18	Kyle Busch	Joe Gibbs Racing	Toyota	19.809	95.593
Official first practice results

=== Final practice ===
Ryan Newman was the fastest in the final practice session with a time of 19.785 seconds and a speed of 95.709 mph (154.029 km/h).

Pos	No.	Driver	Team	Manufacturer	Time	Speed
1	31	Ryan Newman	Richard Childress Racing	Chevrolet	19.785	95.709
2	9	Chase Elliott	Hendrick Motorsports	Chevrolet	19.951	94.913
3	18	Kyle Busch	Joe Gibbs Racing	Toyota	19.978	94.784
Official final practice results

== Qualifying ==
Kyle Busch scored the pole for the race with a time of 19.673 and a speed of 96.254 mph (154.906 km/h).

=== Qualifying results ===
Pos	No.	Driver	Team	Manufacturer	R1	R2	R3
1	18	Kyle Busch	Joe Gibbs Racing	Toyota	19.795	19.711	19.673
2	14	Clint Bowyer	Stewart–Haas Racing	Ford	19.694	19.716	19.700
3	11	Denny Hamlin	Joe Gibbs Racing	Toyota	19.738	19.715	19.702
4	12	Ryan Blaney	Team Penske	Ford	19.660	19.761	19.706
5	10	Aric Almirola	Stewart–Haas Racing	Ford	19.717	19.722	19.713
6	78	Martin Truex Jr.	Furniture Row Racing	Toyota	19.858	19.751	19.739
7	41	Kurt Busch	Stewart–Haas Racing	Ford	19.719	19.692	19.692
8	2	Brad Keselowski	Team Penske	Ford	19.831	19.780	19.770
9	19	Daniel Suárez	Joe Gibbs Racing	Toyota	19.792	19.731	19.786
10	42	Kyle Larson	Chip Ganassi Racing	Chevrolet	19.763	19.741	19.806
11	22	Joey Logano	Team Penske	Ford	19.730	19.802	19.825
12	24	William Byron (R)	Hendrick Motorsports	Chevrolet	19.836	19.762	19.877
13	4	Kevin Harvick	Stewart–Haas Racing	Ford	19.836	19.822	—
14	38	David Ragan	Front Row Motorsports	Ford	19.796	19.796	—
15	37	Chris Buescher	JTG Daugherty Racing	Chevrolet	19.795	19.795	—
16	88	Alex Bowman	Hendrick Motorsports	Chevrolet	19.863	19.842	—
17	47	A. J. Allmendinger	JTG Daugherty Racing	Chevrolet	19.756	19.756	—
18	31	Ryan Newman	Richard Childress Racing	Chevrolet	19.763	19.763	—
19	1	Jamie McMurray	Chip Ganassi Racing	Chevrolet	19.740	19.740	—
20	17	Ricky Stenhouse Jr.	Roush–Fenway Racing	Ford	19.832	19.832	—
21	9	Chase Elliott	Hendrick Motorsports	Chevrolet	19.891	19.891	—
22	34	Michael McDowell	Front Row Motorsports	Ford	19.879	19.879	—
23	48	Jimmie Johnson	Hendrick Motorsports	Chevrolet	19.881	19.881	—
24	20	Erik Jones	Joe Gibbs Racing	Toyota	19.802	19.802	—
25	15	Ross Chastain (i)	Premium Motorsports	Chevrolet	19.898	—	—
26	13	Ty Dillon	Germain Racing	Chevrolet	19.905	—	—
27	6	Matt Kenseth	Roush–Fenway Racing	Ford	19.913	—	—
28	3	Austin Dillon	Richard Childress Racing	Chevrolet	19.916	—	—
29	32	Matt DiBenedetto	Go Fas Racing	Ford	19.918	—	—
30	95	Regan Smith	Leavine Family Racing	Chevrolet	19.941	—	—
31	72	Cole Whitt	TriStar Motorsports	Chevrolet	20.057	—	—
32	43	Bubba Wallace (R)	Richard Petty Motorsports	Chevrolet	20.062	—	—
33	96	D. J. Kennington (i)	Gaunt Brothers Racing	Toyota	20.162	—	—
34	23	J. J. Yeley (i)	BK Racing	Toyota	20.205	—	—
35	00	Joey Gase (i)	StarCom Racing	Chevrolet	20.342	—	—
36	51	Jeb Burton (i)	Rick Ware Racing	Chevrolet	20.388	—	—
37	66	Timmy Hill (i)	MBM Motorsports	Toyota	20.432	—	—
38	7	Hermie Sadler	Premium Motorsports	Chevrolet	20.472	—	—
39	21	Paul Menard	Wood Brothers Racing	Ford	21.040	—	—
40	99	Landon Cassill (i)	StarCom Racing	Chevrolet	0.000	—	—
Official qualifying results

== Race ==
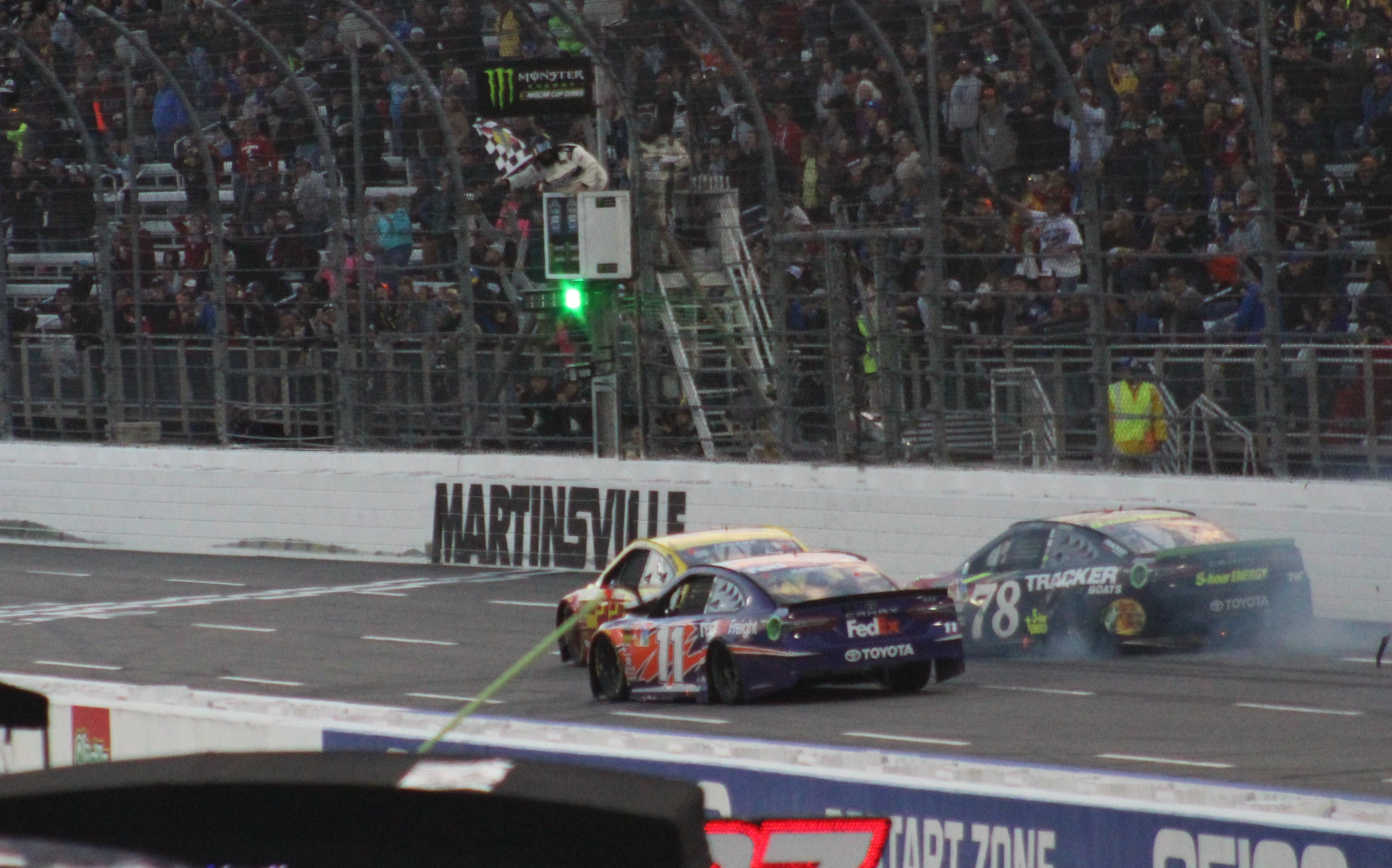
Joey Logano won the race.

=== Stage Results ===
Stage 1 Laps: 130

Pos	No	Driver	Team	Manufacturer	Points
1	11	Denny Hamlin	Joe Gibbs Racing	Toyota	10
2	22	Joey Logano	Team Penske	Ford	9
3	18	Kyle Busch	Joe Gibbs Racing	Toyota	8
4	14	Clint Bowyer	Stewart–Haas Racing	Ford	7
5	41	Kurt Busch	Stewart–Haas Racing	Ford	6
6	31	Ryan Newman	Richard Childress Racing	Chevrolet	5
7	78	Martin Truex Jr.	Furniture Row Racing	Toyota	4
8	12	Ryan Blaney	Team Penske	Ford	3
9	4	Kevin Harvick	Stewart–Haas Racing	Ford	2
10	10	Aric Almirola	Stewart–Haas Racing	Ford	1
Official stage one results

Stage 2 Laps: 130

Pos	No	Driver	Team	Manufacturer	Points
1	22	Joey Logano	Team Penske	Ford	10
2	11	Denny Hamlin	Joe Gibbs Racing	Toyota	9
3	18	Kyle Busch	Joe Gibbs Racing	Toyota	8
4	78	Martin Truex Jr.	Furniture Row Racing	Toyota	7
5	41	Kurt Busch	Stewart–Haas Racing	Ford	6
6	31	Ryan Newman	Richard Childress Racing	Chevrolet	5
7	9	Chase Elliott	Hendrick Motorsports	Chevrolet	4
8	14	Clint Bowyer	Stewart–Haas Racing	Ford	3
9	47	A. J. Allmendinger	JTG Daugherty Racing	Chevrolet	2
10	2	Brad Keselowski	Team Penske	Ford	1
Official stage two results

=== Final Stage Results ===
Stage 3 Laps: 240

Pos	Grid	No	Driver	Team	Manufacturer	Laps	Points
1	11	22	Joey Logano	Team Penske	Ford	500	59
2	3	11	Denny Hamlin	Joe Gibbs Racing	Toyota	500	54
3	6	78	Martin Truex Jr.	Furniture Row Racing	Toyota	500	45
4	1	18	Kyle Busch	Joe Gibbs Racing	Toyota	500	49
5	8	2	Brad Keselowski	Team Penske	Ford	500	33
6	7	41	Kurt Busch	Stewart–Haas Racing	Ford	500	43
7	21	9	Chase Elliott	Hendrick Motorsports	Chevrolet	500	34
8	18	31	Ryan Newman	Richard Childress Racing	Chevrolet	500	39
9	9	19	Daniel Suárez	Joe Gibbs Racing	Toyota	500	28
10	13	4	Kevin Harvick	Stewart–Haas Racing	Ford	500	29
11	5	10	Aric Almirola	Stewart–Haas Racing	Ford	500	27
12	23	48	Jimmie Johnson	Hendrick Motorsports	Chevrolet	500	25
13	15	37	Chris Buescher	JTG Daugherty Racing	Chevrolet	500	24
14	17	47	A. J. Allmendinger	JTG Daugherty Racing	Chevrolet	500	25
15	26	13	Ty Dillon	Germain Racing	Chevrolet	500	22
16	19	1	Jamie McMurray	Chip Ganassi Racing	Chevrolet	500	21
17	16	88	Alex Bowman	Hendrick Motorsports	Chevrolet	500	20
18	14	38	David Ragan	Front Row Motorsports	Ford	500	19
19	20	17	Ricky Stenhouse Jr.	Roush–Fenway Racing	Ford	500	18
20	4	12	Ryan Blaney	Team Penske	Ford	500	20
21	2	14	Clint Bowyer	Stewart–Haas Racing	Ford	499	26
22	39	21	Paul Menard	Wood Brothers Racing	Ford	499	15
23	27	6	Matt Kenseth	Roush–Fenway Racing	Ford	499	14
24	31	72	Cole Whitt	TriStar Motorsports	Chevrolet	498	13
25	22	34	Michael McDowell	Front Row Motorsports	Ford	497	12
26	24	20	Erik Jones	Joe Gibbs Racing	Toyota	494	11
27	33	96	D. J. Kennington (i)	Gaunt Brothers Racing	Toyota	493	0
28	30	95	Regan Smith	Leavine Family Racing	Chevrolet	492	9
29	25	15	Ross Chastain (i)	Premium Motorsports	Chevrolet	492	0
30	28	3	Austin Dillon	Richard Childress Racing	Chevrolet	491	7
31	34	23	J. J. Yeley (i)	BK Racing	Toyota	491	0
32	40	99	Landon Cassill (i)	StarCom Racing	Chevrolet	490	0
33	36	51	Jeb Burton (i)	Rick Ware Racing	Chevrolet	489	0
34	32	43	Bubba Wallace (R)	Richard Petty Motorsports	Chevrolet	488	3
35	35	00	Joey Gase (i)	StarCom Racing	Chevrolet	467	0
36	29	32	Matt DiBenedetto	Go Fas Racing	Ford	451	1
37	10	42	Kyle Larson	Chip Ganassi Racing	Chevrolet	393	1
38	37	66	Timmy Hill (i)	MBM Motorsports	Toyota	368	0
39	12	24	William Byron (R)	Hendrick Motorsports	Chevrolet	364	1
40	38	7	Hermie Sadler	Premium Motorsports	Chevrolet	230	1
Official race results

=== Race statistics ===
- Lead changes: 6 among different drivers
- Cautions/Laps: 8 for 68
- Red flags: 0
- Time of race: 3 hours, 29 minutes and 32 seconds
- Average speed: 75.310 miles per hour (121.200 km/h)

== Media ==
=== Television ===
NBC Sports covered the race on the television side. Rick Allen, 1997 race winner Jeff Burton, Steve Letarte and 2014 race winner Dale Earnhardt Jr. had the call in the booth for the race. Dave Burns, Parker Kligerman, Marty Snider and Kelli Stavast reported from pit lane during the race.

NBCSN
Booth announcers	Pit reporters
Lap-by-lap: Rick Allen; Color-commentator: Jeff Burton; Color-commentator: Steve Letarte; Color-commentator: Dale Earnhardt Jr.	Dave Burns; Parker Kligerman; Marty Snider; Kelli Stavast

=== Radio ===
MRN covered the radio call for the race, which was simulcast on SiriusXM NASCAR Radio.

MRN
Booth announcers	Turn announcers	Pit reporters
Lead announcer: Joe Moore; Announcer: Jeff Striegle; Announcer: Rusty Wallace	Backstretch: Dave Moody	Alex Hayden; Winston Kelley; Steve Post; Kim Coon

== Standings after the race ==
	Pos	Driver	Points
	1	Kyle Busch	4,104
1	2	Martin Truex Jr.	4,083 (–21)
1	3	Kevin Harvick	4,083 (–21)
2	4	Joey Logano	4,074 (–30)
2	5	Kurt Busch	4,058 (–46)
2	6	Chase Elliott	4,052 (–52)
2	7	Clint Bowyer	4,041 (–63)
	8	Aric Almirola	4,033 (–71)
	9	Ryan Blaney	2,232 (–1,872)
	10	Brad Keselowski	2,227 (–1,877)
1	11	Denny Hamlin	2,213 (–1,891)
1	12	Kyle Larson	2,179 (–1,925)
2	13	Jimmie Johnson	2,173 (–1,931)
2	14	Alex Bowman	2,164 (–1,940)
1	15	Erik Jones	2,159 (–1,949)
3	16	Austin Dillon	2,157 (–1,947)
Official driver's standings

Manufacturers' Championship standings

Pos	Manufacturer	Points
1	Ford	1,195
2	Toyota	1,178 (–17)
3	Chevrolet	1,091 (–104)
Official manufacturers' standings

- Note: Only the first 16 positions are included for the driver standings.

Previous race: 2018 Hollywood Casino 400	Monster Energy NASCAR Cup Series; 2018 season	Next race: 2018 AAA Texas 500
