= 2018 My Bariatric Solutions 300 =

Sixth race of the 2018 NASCAR Xfinity Series

Race details
- Race 6 of 33 of the 2018 NASCAR Xfinity Series
- Date: April 7, 2018
- Official name: My Bariatric Solutions 300
- Location: Fort Worth, Texas, Texas Motor Speedway
- Course: Permanent racing facility
- Course length: 1.5 miles (2.41 km)
- Distance: 200 laps, 300 mi (482.803 km)
- Scheduled distance: 200 laps, 300 mi (482.803 km)
- Average speed: 124.986 miles per hour (201.145 km/h)

Pole position
Driver	Ryan Blaney	Team Penske
- Time: 28.439

Most laps led
Driver	Ryan Blaney	Team Penske
- Laps: 132

Winner
No. 22	Ryan Blaney	Team Penske

Television in the United States
- Network: Fox
- Announcers: Adam Alexander, Michael Waltrip, Clint Bowyer

Radio in the United States
- Radio: Performance Racing Network

The 2018 My Bariatric Solutions 300 was the 6th stock car race of the 2018 NASCAR Xfinity Series season, and the 22nd iteration of the event. The race was held on Saturday, April 7, 2018, in Fort Worth, Texas, at Texas Motor Speedway, a 1.5 miles (2.4 km) permanent tri-oval shaped racetrack. The race took the scheduled 200 laps to complete. At race's end, Ryan Blaney of Team Penske would dominate and win his 7th and so far final career NASCAR Xfinity Series win, and his first and only of his part-time season. To fill out the podium, Christopher Bell of Joe Gibbs Racing and Daniel Hemric of Richard Childress Racing would finish second and third, respectively.

== Background ==
The layout of Texas Motor Speedway, the venue where the race was held.

Texas Motor Speedway is a speedway located in the northernmost portion of the U.S. city of Fort Worth, Texas – the portion located in Denton County, Texas. The track measures 1.5 miles (2.4 km) around and is banked 24 degrees in the turns, and is of the oval design, where the front straightaway juts outward slightly. The track layout is similar to Atlanta Motor Speedway and Charlotte Motor Speedway (formerly Lowe's Motor Speedway). The track is owned by Speedway Motorsports, Inc., the same company that owns Atlanta and Charlotte Motor Speedway, as well as the short-track Bristol Motor Speedway.

=== Entry list ===
#	Driver	Team	Make	Sponsor
0	Garrett Smithley	JD Motorsports	Chevrolet	Trophy Tractor, KY FAME
00	Cole Custer	Stewart-Haas Racing with Biagi-DenBeste	Ford	Thompson Pipe Group
1	Elliott Sadler	JR Motorsports	Chevrolet	OneMain Financial "Lending Done Human"
01	Vinnie Miller	JD Motorsports	Chevrolet	JAS Expedited Trucking
2	Matt Tifft	Richard Childress Racing	Chevrolet	Surface Sunscreen, Fanatics
3	Ty Dillon	Richard Childress Racing	Chevrolet	Wrangler, FTS International
4	Ross Chastain	JD Motorsports	Chevrolet	Flex Seal
5	Michael Annett	JR Motorsports	Chevrolet	Pilot Flying J
7	Justin Allgaier	JR Motorsports	Chevrolet	Brandt Professional Agriculture
8	Bayley Currey	B. J. McLeod Motorsports	Chevrolet	Chasco
9	Tyler Reddick	JR Motorsports	Chevrolet	BurgerFi
11	Ryan Truex	Kaulig Racing	Chevrolet	Bar Harbor
12	Austin Cindric	Team Penske	Ford	Mazak
15	Matt Mills	JD Motorsports	Chevrolet	JD Motorsports
16	Ryan Reed	Roush Fenway Racing	Ford	DriveDownA1C.com
18	Ryan Preece	Joe Gibbs Racing	Toyota	Ruud, RTP Imagineering Plastics
19	Brandon Jones	Joe Gibbs Racing	Toyota	Toyota Service Centers
20	Christopher Bell	Joe Gibbs Racing	Toyota	GameStop, Hello Neighbor
21	Daniel Hemric	Richard Childress Racing	Chevrolet	South Point Hotel, Casino & Spa
22	Ryan Blaney	Team Penske	Ford	Fitzgerald Glider Kits
23	Spencer Gallagher	GMS Racing	Chevrolet	Allegiant Air
24	Kaz Grala	JGL Racing	Ford	Nettts
28	Dylan Lupton	JGL Racing	Ford	ThinQ Technology Partners
35	Joey Gase	Go Green Racing with SS-Green Light Racing	Chevrolet	Sparks Energy
36	Alex Labbé	DGM Racing	Chevrolet	Wholey's, Can-Am
38	J. J. Yeley	RSS Racing	Chevrolet	RSS Racing
39	Ryan Sieg	RSS Racing	Chevrolet	RV General Store
40	Chad Finchum	MBM Motorsports	Toyota	"TLC" Resorts Vacation Club, Smithbilt Homes
42	Jamie McMurray	Chip Ganassi Racing	Chevrolet	DC Solar
45	Josh Bilicki	JP Motorsports	Toyota	Prevagen
51	Jeremy Clements	Jeremy Clements Racing	Chevrolet	RepairableVehicles.com
52	David Starr	Jimmy Means Racing	Chevrolet	Whataburger
55	Stephen Leicht	JP Motorsports	Toyota	Jani-King "The King of Clean"
60	Chase Briscoe	Roush Fenway Racing	Ford	NutriChomps
66	Timmy Hill	MBM Motorsports	Dodge	CrashClaimsR.Us, Chris Kyle Memorial Benefit
74	Mike Harmon	Mike Harmon Racing	Chevrolet	Shadow Warriors Project
76	Spencer Boyd	SS-Green Light Racing	Chevrolet	Grunt Style "This We'll Defend"
78	B. J. McLeod	B. J. McLeod Motorsports	Chevrolet	
89	Morgan Shepherd	Shepherd Racing Ventures	Chevrolet	Visone RV Motorhome Parts, Racing with Jesus
90	Josh Williams	DGM Racing	Chevrolet	Star Tron, Sleep Well Sleep Disorder Specialists
93	Jeff Green	RSS Racing	Chevrolet	RSS Racing
98	Kevin Harvick	Stewart-Haas Racing with Biagi-DenBeste	Ford	Hunt Brothers Pizza
Official entry list

== Practice ==
=== First practice ===
The first practice was held on Friday, April 6 at 1:05 PM CST. Ryan Truex would set the fastest lap in the session with a time of 28.836 and an average speed of 187.266 miles per hour (301.375 km/h).

Pos.	#	Driver	Team	Make	Time	Speed
1	11	Ryan Truex	Kaulig Racing	Chevrolet	28.836	187.266
2	21	Daniel Hemric	Richard Childress Racing	Chevrolet	28.884	186.955
3	22	Ryan Blaney	Team Penske	Ford	28.894	186.890
Full first practice results

=== Second and final practice ===
The second and final practice was held on Friday, April 6 at 3:05 PM CST. Daniel Hemric of Richard Childress Racing would set the fastest lap in the session with a time of 28.963 and an average speed of 186.445 miles per hour (300.054 km/h).

Pos.	#	Driver	Team	Make	Time	Speed
1	21	Daniel Hemric	Richard Childress Racing	Chevrolet	28.963	186.445
2	22	Ryan Blaney	Team Penske	Ford	28.995	186.239
3	19	Brandon Jones	Joe Gibbs Racing	Toyota	29.075	185.727
Full final practice results

== Qualifying ==
Qualifying would take place on Saturday, April 7, at 11:10 AM CST. Since Texas Motor Speedway is under 2 miles (3.2 km), the qualifying system was a multi-car system that included three rounds. The first round was 15 minutes, where every driver would be able to set a lap within the 15 minutes. Then, the second round would consist of the fastest 24 cars in Round 1, and drivers would have 10 minutes to set a lap. Round 3 consisted of the fastest 12 drivers from Round 2, and the drivers would have 5 minutes to set a time. Whoever was fastest in Round 3 would win the pole.

However, qualifying would be rained out midway through the first round. NASCAR would decide to cancel qualifying and decide that every driver who ran a time before the red flag would have their times retained. Then, the drivers who didn't run a time would qualify based on owner's points. As a result, Ryan Blaney of Team Penske would win the pole after setting a time of 28.439 and an average speed of 189.880 miles per hour (305.582 km/h).

Two drivers would fail to qualify: Mike Harmon and Matt Mills.

=== Full qualifying results ===
Pos.	#	Driver	Team	Make	Time	Speed
1	22	Ryan Blaney	Team Penske	Ford	28.439	189.880
2	11	Ryan Truex	Kaulig Racing	Chevrolet	28.524	189.314
3	19	Brandon Jones	Joe Gibbs Racing	Toyota	28.608	188.758
4	16	Ryan Reed	Roush Fenway Racing	Ford	28.641	188.541
5	42	Jamie McMurray	Chip Ganassi Racing	Chevrolet	28.679	188.291
6	9	Tyler Reddick	JR Motorsports	Chevrolet	28.716	188.048
7	3	Ty Dillon	Richard Childress Racing	Chevrolet	28.723	188.003
8	7	Justin Allgaier	JR Motorsports	Chevrolet	28.742	187.878
9	38	J. J. Yeley	RSS Racing	Chevrolet	28.762	187.748
10	00	Cole Custer	Stewart-Haas Racing with Biagi-DenBeste	Ford	28.842	187.227
11	39	Ryan Sieg	RSS Racing	Chevrolet	28.868	187.058
12	51	Jeremy Clements	Jeremy Clements Racing	Chevrolet	28.901	186.845
13	18	Ryan Preece	Joe Gibbs Racing	Toyota	28.958	186.477
14	23	Spencer Gallagher	GMS Racing	Chevrolet	28.994	186.245
15	4	Ross Chastain	JD Motorsports	Chevrolet	28.998	186.220
16	12	Austin Cindric	Team Penske	Ford	29.004	186.181
17	78	B. J. McLeod	B. J. McLeod Motorsports	Chevrolet	29.195	184.963
18	20	Christopher Bell	Joe Gibbs Racing	Toyota	29.297	184.319
19	0	Garrett Smithley	JD Motorsports	Chevrolet	29.299	184.307
20	5	Michael Annett	JR Motorsports	Chevrolet	29.328	184.124
21	60	Chase Briscoe	Roush Fenway Racing	Ford	29.338	184.062
22	36	Alex Labbé	DGM Racing	Chevrolet	29.367	183.880
23	66	Timmy Hill	MBM Motorsports	Dodge	29.507	183.007
24	28	Dylan Lupton	JGL Racing	Ford	29.559	182.685
25	55	Stephen Leicht	JP Motorsports	Toyota	29.607	182.389
26	40	Chad Finchum	MBM Motorsports	Toyota	29.631	182.242
27	35	Joey Gase	Go Green Racing with SS-Green Light Racing	Chevrolet	29.662	182.051
28	76	Spencer Boyd	SS-Green Light Racing	Chevrolet	29.723	181.677
29	93	Jeff Green	RSS Racing	Chevrolet	29.753	181.494
30	45	Josh Bilicki	JP Motorsports	Toyota	29.924	180.457
31	89	Morgan Shepherd	Shepherd Racing Ventures	Chevrolet	30.174	178.962
32	52	David Starr	Jimmy Means Racing	Chevrolet	30.199	178.814
33	01	Vinnie Miller	JD Motorsports	Chevrolet	30.416	177.538
Qualified by owner's points
34	1	Elliott Sadler	JR Motorsports	Chevrolet	—	—
35	21	Daniel Hemric	Richard Childress Racing	Chevrolet	—	—
36	2	Matt Tifft	Richard Childress Racing	Chevrolet	—	—
37	24	Kaz Grala	JGL Racing	Ford	—	—
38	90	Josh Williams	DGM Racing	Chevrolet	—	—
39	8	Bayley Currey	B. J. McLeod Motorsports	Chevrolet	—	—
Champion's Provisional
40	98	Kevin Harvick	Stewart-Haas Racing with Biagi-DenBeste	Ford	—	—
Failed to qualify
41	74	Mike Harmon	Mike Harmon Racing	Chevrolet	31.003	174.177
42	15	Matt Mills	JD Motorsports	Chevrolet	—	—
Official qualifying results

== Race results ==
Stage 1 Laps: 45

Fin	#	Driver	Team	Make	Pts
1	22	Ryan Blaney	Team Penske	Ford	0
2	19	Brandon Jones	Joe Gibbs Racing	Toyota	9
3	9	Tyler Reddick	JR Motorsports	Chevrolet	8
4	18	Ryan Preece	Joe Gibbs Racing	Toyota	7
5	11	Ryan Truex	Kaulig Racing	Chevrolet	6
6	16	Ryan Reed	Roush Fenway Racing	Ford	5
7	00	Cole Custer	Stewart-Haas Racing with Biagi-DenBeste	Ford	4
8	98	Kevin Harvick	Stewart-Haas Racing with Biagi-DenBeste	Ford	0
9	2	Matt Tifft	Richard Childress Racing	Chevrolet	2
10	20	Christopher Bell	Joe Gibbs Racing	Toyota	1

Stage 2 Laps: 45

Fin	#	Driver	Team	Make	Pts
1	19	Brandon Jones	Joe Gibbs Racing	Toyota	10
2	11	Ryan Truex	Kaulig Racing	Chevrolet	9
3	39	Ryan Sieg	RSS Racing	Chevrolet	8
4	4	Ross Chastain	JD Motorsports	Chevrolet	7
5	16	Ryan Reed	Roush Fenway Racing	Ford	6
6	38	J. J. Yeley	RSS Racing	Chevrolet	5
7	23	Spencer Gallagher	GMS Racing	Chevrolet	4
8	0	Garrett Smithley	JD Motorsports	Chevrolet	3
9	5	Michael Annett	JR Motorsports	Chevrolet	2
10	51	Jeremy Clements	Jeremy Clements Racing	Chevrolet	1

Stage 3 Laps: 110

Fin	St	#	Driver	Team	Make	Laps	Led	Status	Pts
1	1	22	Ryan Blaney	Team Penske	Ford	200	132	running	0
2	18	20	Christopher Bell	Joe Gibbs Racing	Toyota	200	10	running	36
3	35	21	Daniel Hemric	Richard Childress Racing	Chevrolet	200	39	running	34
4	10	00	Cole Custer	Stewart-Haas Racing with Biagi-DenBeste	Ford	200	0	running	37
5	13	18	Ryan Preece	Joe Gibbs Racing	Toyota	200	0	running	39
6	36	2	Matt Tifft	Richard Childress Racing	Chevrolet	200	0	running	33
7	5	42	Jamie McMurray	Chip Ganassi Racing	Chevrolet	200	0	running	0
8	34	1	Elliott Sadler	JR Motorsports	Chevrolet	200	0	running	29
9	16	12	Austin Cindric	Team Penske	Ford	200	0	running	28
10	14	23	Spencer Gallagher	GMS Racing	Chevrolet	200	0	running	31
11	21	60	Chase Briscoe	Roush Fenway Racing	Ford	199	0	running	26
12	7	3	Ty Dillon	Richard Childress Racing	Chevrolet	199	0	running	0
13	2	11	Ryan Truex	Kaulig Racing	Chevrolet	199	1	running	39
14	4	16	Ryan Reed	Roush Fenway Racing	Ford	199	0	running	34
15	20	5	Michael Annett	JR Motorsports	Chevrolet	199	5	running	24
16	12	51	Jeremy Clements	Jeremy Clements Racing	Chevrolet	198	1	running	22
17	24	28	Dylan Lupton	JGL Racing	Ford	198	0	running	20
18	11	39	Ryan Sieg	RSS Racing	Chevrolet	198	0	running	27
19	40	98	Kevin Harvick	Stewart-Haas Racing with Biagi-DenBeste	Ford	198	0	running	0
20	27	35	Joey Gase	Go Green Racing with SS-Green Light Racing	Chevrolet	196	0	running	17
21	32	52	David Starr	Jimmy Means Racing	Chevrolet	196	0	running	16
22	39	8	Bayley Currey	B. J. McLeod Motorsports	Chevrolet	196	0	running	0
23	6	9	Tyler Reddick	JR Motorsports	Chevrolet	195	0	running	22
24	30	45	Josh Bilicki	JP Motorsports	Toyota	193	0	running	13
25	28	76	Spencer Boyd	SS-Green Light Racing	Chevrolet	193	0	running	12
26	37	24	Kaz Grala	JGL Racing	Ford	189	0	running	11
27	19	0	Garrett Smithley	JD Motorsports	Chevrolet	189	0	fuel pump	13
28	15	4	Ross Chastain	JD Motorsports	Chevrolet	147	2	rear end	16
29	17	78	B. J. McLeod	B. J. McLeod Motorsports	Chevrolet	137	0	clutch	8
30	38	90	Josh Williams	DGM Racing	Chevrolet	112	0	suspension	7
31	9	38	J. J. Yeley	RSS Racing	Chevrolet	109	1	engine	11
32	22	36	Alex Labbé	DGM Racing	Chevrolet	104	0	accident	5
33	3	19	Brandon Jones	Joe Gibbs Racing	Toyota	99	9	accident	23
34	26	40	Chad Finchum	MBM Motorsports	Toyota	77	0	accident	3
35	8	7	Justin Allgaier	JR Motorsports	Chevrolet	70	0	engine	2
36	23	66	Timmy Hill	MBM Motorsports	Dodge	54	0	fuel pump	1
37	25	55	Stephen Leicht	JP Motorsports	Toyota	53	0	electrical	1
38	31	89	Morgan Shepherd	Shepherd Racing Ventures	Chevrolet	33	0	suspension	1
39	33	01	Vinnie Miller	JD Motorsports	Chevrolet	15	0	accident	1
40	29	93	Jeff Green	RSS Racing	Chevrolet	13	0	electrical	1
Failed to qualify
41		74	Mike Harmon	Mike Harmon Racing	Chevrolet				
42		15	Matt Mills	JD Motorsports	Chevrolet				
Official race results

Previous race: 2018 Roseanne 300	NASCAR Xfinity Series; 2018 season	Next race: 2018 Fitzgerald Glider Kits 300
