= 2018 Fitzgerald Glider Kits 300 =

Seventh race of the 2018 NASCAR Xfinity Series

Race details
- Race 7 of 33 of the 2018 NASCAR Xfinity Series
- Date: April 14, 2018
- Official name: 36th Annual Fitzgerald Glider Kits 300
- Location: Bristol, Tennessee, Bristol Motor Speedway
- Course: Permanent racing facility
- Course length: 0.533 miles (0.858 km)
- Distance: 300 laps, 159.9 mi (257.334 km)
- Scheduled distance: 300 laps, 159.9 mi (257.334 km)
- Average speed: 67.857 miles per hour (109.205 km/h)

Pole position
Driver	Cole Custer	Stewart-Haas Racing with Biagi-DenBeste
- Time: 15.090

Most laps led
Driver	Brandon Jones	Joe Gibbs Racing
- Laps: 106

Winner
No. 18	Ryan Preece	Joe Gibbs Racing

Television in the United States
- Network: Fox Sports 1
- Announcers: Adam Alexander, Michael Waltrip, Joey Logano

Radio in the United States
- Radio: Performance Racing Network

The 2018 Fitzgerald Glider Kits 300 was the seventh stock car race of the 2018 NASCAR Xfinity Series season, and the 36th iteration of the event. The race was held Saturday, April 14, 2018, in Bristol, Tennessee at Bristol Motor Speedway, a 0.533 miles (0.858 km) permanent oval-shaped racetrack. The race took the scheduled 300 laps to complete. At race's end, Ryan Preece of Joe Gibbs Racing would take the lead on the final restart with 10 laps to go and win his second and to date, final career NASCAR Xfinity Series win and his first and only win of the season. To fill out the podium, Justin Allgaier of JR Motorsports and Daniel Hemric of Richard Childress Racing would finish second and third, respectively.

== Background ==
The layout of Bristol Motor Speedway, the venue where the race was held.

The Bristol Motor Speedway, formerly known as Bristol International Raceway and Bristol Raceway, is a NASCAR short track venue located in Bristol, Tennessee. Constructed in 1960, it held its first NASCAR race on July 30, 1961. Despite its short length, Bristol is among the most popular tracks on the NASCAR schedule because of its distinct features, which include extraordinarily steep banking, an all concrete surface, two pit roads, and stadium-like seating. It has also been named one of the loudest NASCAR tracks.

=== Entry list ===
#	Driver	Team	Make	Sponsor
0	Garrett Smithley	JD Motorsports	Chevrolet	VehicleKeys.com
00	Cole Custer	Stewart-Haas Racing with Biagi-DenBeste	Ford	Haas Automation
1	Elliott Sadler	JR Motorsports	Chevrolet	Armour Chili
01	Vinnie Miller	JD Motorsports	Chevrolet	Flex Glue
2	Matt Tifft	Richard Childress Racing	Chevrolet	Tunity "Hear Any Muted TV"
3	Shane Lee	Richard Childress Racing	Chevrolet	Childress Vineyards
4	Ross Chastain	JD Motorsports	Chevrolet	Florida Watermelon Association
5	Michael Annett	JR Motorsports	Chevrolet	Pilot Flying J
7	Justin Allgaier	JR Motorsports	Chevrolet	Suave Men
8	Tommy Joe Martins	B. J. McLeod Motorsports	Chevrolet	Gilreath Farms Red Angus "The New Black", AAN Adjusters
9	Tyler Reddick	JR Motorsports	Chevrolet	BurgerFi
11	Ryan Truex	Kaulig Racing	Chevrolet	Bar Harbor
15	Joe Nemechek	JD Motorsports	Chevrolet	Flex Seal
16	Ryan Reed	Roush Fenway Racing	Ford	DriveDownA1C.com
18	Ryan Preece	Joe Gibbs Racing	Toyota	Rheem
19	Brandon Jones	Joe Gibbs Racing	Toyota	Menards, Turtle Wax
20	Christopher Bell	Joe Gibbs Racing	Toyota	GameStop, Seagate Game Drive for Xbox
21	Daniel Hemric	Richard Childress Racing	Chevrolet	South Point Hotel, Casino & Spa
22	Austin Cindric	Team Penske	Ford	Fitzgerald Glider Kits
23	Spencer Gallagher	GMS Racing	Chevrolet	Allegiant Air
24	Kaz Grala	JGL Racing	Ford	Nettts
28	Tony Mrakovich*	JGL Racing	Ford	Smart Emissions Reducer
35	Joey Gase	Go Green Racing with SS-Green Light Racing	Chevrolet	Sparks Energy
36	Alex Labbé	DGM Racing	Chevrolet	Wholey's, Can-Am
38	J. J. Yeley**	RSS Racing	Chevrolet	RSS Racing
39	Ryan Sieg**	RSS Racing	Chevrolet	Lombard Bros Gaming
40	Chad Finchum	MBM Motorsports	Toyota	Smithbilt Homes, Concrete North, Inc.
42	John Hunter Nemechek	Chip Ganassi Racing	Chevrolet	Fire Alarm Services
45	Josh Bilicki	JP Motorsports	Toyota	Prevagen
51	Jeremy Clements	Jeremy Clements Racing	Chevrolet	RepairableVehicles.com, All South Electric
52	David Starr	Jimmy Means Racing	Chevrolet	Franklin Signs & Graphics
55	Stephen Leicht	JP Motorsports	Toyota	Jani-King "The King of Clean"
60	Ty Majeski	Roush Fenway Racing	Ford	SunnyD
66	Timmy Hill	MBM Motorsports	Dodge	CrashClaimsR.Us, Chris Kyle Memorial Benefit
74	Cody Ware	Mike Harmon Racing	Dodge	Horizon Transport
76	Spencer Boyd	SS-Green Light Racing	Chevrolet	Grunt Style "This We'll Defend"
78	B. J. McLeod	B. J. McLeod Motorsports	Chevrolet	EPIC Racewear
89	Morgan Shepherd	Shepherd Racing Ventures	Chevrolet	Visone RV Motorhome Parts, Racing with Jesus
90	Josh Williams	DGM Racing	Chevrolet	StarTron, Sleep Well Sleep Disorder Specialists
93	Jeff Green	RSS Racing	Chevrolet	RSS Racing
98	Chase Briscoe	Stewart-Haas Racing with Biagi-DenBeste	Ford	Ford
Official entry list

*Driver would change to Dylan Lupton.

**The two would swap seats for the race, after Sieg destroyed his primary car in qualifying. Yeley would instead start and park the #39.

== Practice ==
=== First practice ===
The first practice session would occur on Friday, April 13, at 1:05 PM EST, and would last for 50 minutes. Brandon Jones of Joe Gibbs Racing would set the fastest time in the session, with a time of 15.495 and an average speed of 123.833 miles per hour (199.290 km/h).

Pos.	#	Driver	Team	Make	Time	Speed
1	19	Brandon Jones	Joe Gibbs Racing	Toyota	15.495	123.833
2	7	Justin Allgaier	JR Motorsports	Chevrolet	15.535	123.515
3	18	Ryan Preece	Joe Gibbs Racing	Toyota	15.537	123.499
Full first practice results

=== Second and final practice ===
The second and final practice session, sometimes referred to as Happy Hour, would occur on Friday, April 13, at 3:05 PM EST, and would last for 50 minutes. Cole Custer of Stewart-Haas Racing with Biagi-DenBeste would set the fastest time in the session, with a time of 15.528 and an average speed of 123.570 miles per hour (198.867 km/h).

Pos.	#	Driver	Team	Make	Time	Speed
1	00	Cole Custer	Stewart-Haas Racing with Biagi-DenBeste	Ford	15.528	123.570
2	21	Daniel Hemric	Richard Childress Racing	Chevrolet	15.577	123.182
3	19	Brandon Jones	Joe Gibbs Racing	Toyota	15.585	123.118
Full Happy Hour practice results

== Qualifying ==
Qualifying was held on Saturday, April 14, at 9:35 AM EST. Since Bristol Motor Speedway is under 2 miles (3.2 km), the qualifying system was a multi-car system that included three rounds. The first round was 15 minutes, where every driver would be able to set a lap within the 15 minutes. Then, the second round would consist of the fastest 24 cars in Round 1, and drivers would have 10 minutes to set a lap. Round 3 consisted of the fastest 12 drivers from Round 2, and the drivers would have 5 minutes to set a time. Whoever was fastest in Round 3 would win the pole.

Cole Custer of Stewart-Haas Racing with Biagi-DenBeste would win the pole, setting a time of 15.090 and an average speed of 127.157 miles per hour (204.639 km/h).

One driver would fail to qualify: Morgan Shepherd.

=== Full qualifying results ===
Pos.	#	Driver	Team	Make	Time (R1)	Speed (R1)	Time (R2)	Speed (R2)	Time (R3)	Speed (R3)
1	00	Cole Custer	Stewart-Haas Racing with Biagi-DenBeste	Ford	15.464	124.082	15.216	126.104	15.090	127.157
2	7	Justin Allgaier	JR Motorsports	Chevrolet	15.278	125.592	15.260	125.740	15.119	126.913
3	20	Christopher Bell	Joe Gibbs Racing	Toyota	15.436	124.307	15.204	126.204	15.144	126.704
4	21	Daniel Hemric	Richard Childress Racing	Chevrolet	15.230	125.988	15.208	126.170	15.160	126.570
5	42	John Hunter Nemechek	Chip Ganassi Racing	Chevrolet	15.176	126.436	15.179	126.411	15.179	126.411
6	19	Brandon Jones	Joe Gibbs Racing	Toyota	15.610	122.921	15.260	125.740	15.199	126.245
7	18	Ryan Preece	Joe Gibbs Racing	Toyota	15.538	123.491	15.259	125.749	15.250	125.823
8	3	Shane Lee	Richard Childress Racing	Chevrolet	15.500	123.794	15.378	124.776	15.282	125.559
9	23	Spencer Gallagher	GMS Racing	Chevrolet	15.258	125.757	15.323	125.224	15.301	125.404
10	22	Austin Cindric	Team Penske	Ford	15.355	124.963	15.352	124.987	15.304	125.379
11	2	Matt Tifft	Richard Childress Racing	Chevrolet	15.422	124.420	15.296	125.445	15.304	125.379
12	16	Ryan Reed	Roush Fenway Racing	Ford	15.550	123.395	15.346	125.036	15.422	124.420
Eliminated in Round 2
13	1	Elliott Sadler	JR Motorsports	Chevrolet	15.380	124.759	15.386	124.711	—	—
14	60	Ty Majeski	Roush Fenway Racing	Ford	15.314	125.297	15.393	124.654	—	—
15	4	Ross Chastain	JD Motorsports	Chevrolet	15.434	124.323	15.401	124.589	—	—
16	36	Alex Labbé	DGM Racing	Chevrolet	15.513	123.690	15.417	124.460	—	—
17	24	Kaz Grala	JGL Racing	Ford	15.517	123.658	15.432	124.339	—	—
18	5	Michael Annett	JR Motorsports	Chevrolet	15.555	123.356	15.488	123.889	—	—
19	51	Jeremy Clements	Jeremy Clements Racing	Chevrolet	15.581	123.150	15.491	123.865	—	—
20	39	Ryan Sieg	RSS Racing	Chevrolet	15.587	123.103	15.527	123.578	—	—
21	11	Ryan Truex	Kaulig Racing	Chevrolet	15.438	124.291	15.537	123.499	—	—
22	98	Chase Briscoe	Stewart-Haas Racing with Biagi-DenBeste	Ford	15.552	123.380	15.695	122.255	—	—
23	38	J. J. Yeley	RSS Racing	Chevrolet	15.453	124.170	—	—	—	—
24	93	Jeff Green	RSS Racing	Chevrolet	15.580	123.158	—	—	—	—
Eliminated in Round 1
25	9	Tyler Reddick	JR Motorsports	Chevrolet	15.621	122.835	—	—	—	—
26	78	B. J. McLeod	B. J. McLeod Motorsports	Chevrolet	15.738	121.921	—	—	—	—
27	8	Tommy Joe Martins	B. J. McLeod Motorsports	Chevrolet	15.748	121.844	—	—	—	—
28	35	Joey Gase	Go Green Racing with SS-Green Light Racing	Chevrolet	15.792	121.505	—	—	—	—
29	40	Chad Finchum	MBM Motorsports	Toyota	15.917	120.550	—	—	—	—
30	15	Joe Nemechek	JD Motorsports	Chevrolet	15.920	120.528	—	—	—	—
31	66	Timmy Hill	MBM Motorsports	Dodge	15.977	120.098	—	—	—	—
32	90	Josh Williams	DGM Racing	Chevrolet	16.031	119.693	—	—	—	—
33	28	Dylan Lupton	JGL Racing	Ford	16.031	119.693	—	—	—	—
Qualified by owner's points
34	01	Vinnie Miller	JD Motorsports	Chevrolet	16.059	119.484	—	—	—	—
35	0	Garrett Smithley	JD Motorsports	Chevrolet	16.068	119.417	—	—	—	—
36	45	Josh Bilicki	JP Motorsports	Toyota	16.168	118.679	—	—	—	—
37	76	Spencer Boyd	SS-Green Light Racing	Chevrolet	16.296	117.747	—	—	—	—
38	55	Stephen Leicht	JP Motorsports	Toyota	16.331	117.494	—	—	—	—
39	74	Cody Ware	Mike Harmon Racing	Dodge	16.381	117.136	—	—	—	—
40	52	David Starr	Jimmy Means Racing	Chevrolet	16.521	116.143	—	—	—	—
Failed to qualify
41	89	Morgan Shepherd	Shepherd Racing Ventures	Chevrolet	16.547	115.961	—	—	—	—
Official qualifying results
Official starting lineup

== Race results ==
Stage 1 Laps: 85

Pos.	#	Driver	Team	Make	Pts
1	20	Christopher Bell	Joe Gibbs Racing	Toyota	10
2	21	Daniel Hemric	Richard Childress Racing	Chevrolet	9
3	00	Cole Custer	Stewart-Haas Racing with Biagi-DenBeste	Ford	8
4	18	Ryan Preece	Joe Gibbs Racing	Toyota	7
5	22	Austin Cindric	Team Penske	Ford	6
6	42	John Hunter Nemechek	Chip Ganassi Racing	Chevrolet	5
7	3	Shane Lee	Richard Childress Racing	Chevrolet	4
8	16	Ryan Reed	Roush Fenway Racing	Ford	3
9	11	Ryan Truex	Kaulig Racing	Chevrolet	2
10	7	Justin Allgaier	JR Motorsports	Chevrolet	1

Stage 2 Laps: 85

Pos.	#	Driver	Team	Make	Pts
1	18	Ryan Preece	Joe Gibbs Racing	Toyota	10
2	21	Daniel Hemric	Richard Childress Racing	Chevrolet	9
3	7	Justin Allgaier	JR Motorsports	Chevrolet	8
4	3	Shane Lee	Richard Childress Racing	Chevrolet	7
5	22	Austin Cindric	Team Penske	Ford	6
6	42	John Hunter Nemechek	Chip Ganassi Racing	Chevrolet	5
7	4	Ross Chastain	JD Motorsports	Chevrolet	4
8	11	Ryan Truex	Kaulig Racing	Chevrolet	3
9	23	Spencer Gallagher	GMS Racing	Chevrolet	2
10	98	Chase Briscoe	Stewart-Haas Racing with Biagi-DenBeste	Ford	1

Stage 3 Laps: 130

Fin	St	#	Driver	Team	Make	Laps	Led	Status	Pts
1	7	18	Ryan Preece	Joe Gibbs Racing	Toyota	300	39	running	57
2	2	7	Justin Allgaier	JR Motorsports	Chevrolet	300	47	running	44
3	4	21	Daniel Hemric	Richard Childress Racing	Chevrolet	300	61	running	52
4	13	1	Elliott Sadler	JR Motorsports	Chevrolet	300	0	running	33
5	9	23	Spencer Gallagher	GMS Racing	Chevrolet	300	0	running	34
6	6	19	Brandon Jones	Joe Gibbs Racing	Toyota	300	106	running	31
7	25	9	Tyler Reddick	JR Motorsports	Chevrolet	300	0	running	30
8	1	00	Cole Custer	Stewart-Haas Racing with Biagi-DenBeste	Ford	300	1	running	37
9	15	4	Ross Chastain	JD Motorsports	Chevrolet	300	0	running	32
10	21	11	Ryan Truex	Kaulig Racing	Chevrolet	300	0	running	32
11	16	36	Alex Labbé	DGM Racing	Chevrolet	300	0	running	26
12	10	22	Austin Cindric	Team Penske	Ford	300	1	running	37
13	5	42	John Hunter Nemechek	Chip Ganassi Racing	Chevrolet	299	0	running	34
14	8	3	Shane Lee	Richard Childress Racing	Chevrolet	299	0	running	34
15	23	38	Ryan Sieg	RSS Racing	Chevrolet	299	0	running	22
16	28	35	Joey Gase	Go Green Racing with SS-Green Light Racing	Chevrolet	299	0	running	21
17	35	0	Garrett Smithley	JD Motorsports	Chevrolet	298	0	running	20
18	12	16	Ryan Reed	Roush Fenway Racing	Ford	298	0	running	22
19	30	15	Joe Nemechek	JD Motorsports	Chevrolet	298	0	running	0
20	26	78	B. J. McLeod	B. J. McLeod Motorsports	Chevrolet	298	0	running	17
21	18	5	Michael Annett	JR Motorsports	Chevrolet	297	0	running	16
22	32	90	Josh Williams	DGM Racing	Chevrolet	297	0	running	15
23	22	98	Chase Briscoe	Stewart-Haas Racing with Biagi-DenBeste	Ford	295	10	running	15
24	40	52	David Starr	Jimmy Means Racing	Chevrolet	295	0	running	13
25	37	76	Spencer Boyd	SS-Green Light Racing	Chevrolet	295	0	running	12
26	27	8	Tommy Joe Martins	B. J. McLeod Motorsports	Chevrolet	293	0	running	11
27	31	66	Timmy Hill	MBM Motorsports	Dodge	257	0	brakes	10
28	38	55	Stephen Leicht	JP Motorsports	Toyota	212	0	brakes	9
29	3	20	Christopher Bell	Joe Gibbs Racing	Toyota	140	35	crash	18
30	39	74	Cody Ware	Mike Harmon Racing	Dodge	140	0	crash	0
31	33	28	Dylan Lupton	JGL Racing	Ford	133	0	crash	6
32	36	45	Josh Bilicki	JP Motorsports	Toyota	121	0	overheating	5
33	34	01	Vinnie Miller	JD Motorsports	Chevrolet	105	0	crash	4
34	14	60	Ty Majeski	Roush Fenway Racing	Ford	98	0	crash	3
35	11	2	Matt Tifft	Richard Childress Racing	Chevrolet	66	0	crash	2
36	29	40	Chad Finchum	MBM Motorsports	Toyota	48	0	engine	1
37	20	39	J. J. Yeley	RSS Racing	Chevrolet	47	0	brakes	1
38	17	24	Kaz Grala	JGL Racing	Ford	26	0	crash	1
39	24	93	Jeff Green	RSS Racing	Chevrolet	25	0	brakes	1
40	19	51	Jeremy Clements	Jeremy Clements Racing	Chevrolet	4	0	crash	1
Failed to qualify
41		89	Morgan Shepherd	Shepherd Racing Ventures	Chevrolet				
Official race results

Previous race: 2018 My Bariatric Solutions 300	NASCAR Xfinity Series; 2018 season	Next race: 2018 ToyotaCare 250
