= 2013 Irwin Tools Night Race =

Race details
- Race 24 of 36 in the 2013 NASCAR Sprint Cup Series
- 2013 Irwin Tools Night Race program cover created by Sam Bass, showing Tony Stewart throwing his helmet at Matt Kenseth's car from last year's race. The painting is called "Bristol Battles!"
- Date: August 24, 2013
- Location: Bristol Motor Speedway in Bristol, Tennessee
- Course: Permanent racing facility
- Course length: 0.533 miles (0.858 km)
- Distance: 500 laps, 266.5 mi (428.89 km)
- Weather: Temperatures reaching as low as 63 °F (17 °C); wind speeds up to 8 miles per hour (13 km/h)
- Average speed: 90.279 mph (145.290 km/h)

Pole position
Driver	Denny Hamlin	Joe Gibbs Racing
- Time: 14.878 seconds

Most laps led
Driver	Matt Kenseth	Joe Gibbs Racing
- Laps: 149

Winner
No. 20	Matt Kenseth	Joe Gibbs Racing

Television in the United States
- Network: ESPN on ABC
- Announcers: Allen Bestwick, Dale Jarrett, and Andy Petree
- Nielsen ratings: 3.9 (6.322 million viewers)

The 2013 Irwin Tools Night Race was a NASCAR Sprint Cup Series stock car race that was held on August 24, 2013, at Bristol Motor Speedway in Bristol, Tennessee. Contested over 500 laps, it was the twenty-fourth race of the 2013 NASCAR Sprint Cup Series season. Matt Kenseth of Joe Gibbs Racing won the race, his fifth victory of the season, while Kasey Kahne finished second. Juan Pablo Montoya, Brian Vickers, and Joey Logano rounded out the top five.

== Report ==
=== Entry list ===
(R) - Denotes rookie driver.

(i) - Denotes driver who is ineligible for series driver points.

No.	Driver	Team	Manufacturer
1	Jamie McMurray	Earnhardt Ganassi Racing	Chevrolet
2	Brad Keselowski	Penske Racing	Ford
5	Kasey Kahne	Hendrick Motorsports	Chevrolet
7	Dave Blaney	Tommy Baldwin Racing	Chevrolet
9	Marcos Ambrose	Richard Petty Motorsports	Ford
10	Danica Patrick (R)	Stewart–Haas Racing	Chevrolet
11	Denny Hamlin	Joe Gibbs Racing	Toyota
13	Casey Mears	Germain Racing	Ford
14	Mark Martin	Stewart–Haas Racing	Chevrolet
15	Clint Bowyer	Michael Waltrip Racing	Toyota
16	Greg Biffle	Roush Fenway Racing	Ford
17	Ricky Stenhouse Jr. (R)	Roush Fenway Racing	Ford
18	Kyle Busch	Joe Gibbs Racing	Toyota
19	Mike Bliss (i)	Humphrey Smith Racing	Toyota
20	Matt Kenseth	Joe Gibbs Racing	Toyota
22	Joey Logano	Penske Racing	Ford
24	Jeff Gordon	Hendrick Motorsports	Chevrolet
27	Paul Menard	Richard Childress Racing	Chevrolet
29	Kevin Harvick	Richard Childress Racing	Chevrolet
30	David Stremme	Swan Racing	Toyota
31	Jeff Burton	Richard Childress Racing	Chevrolet
32	Ken Schrader	FAS Lane Racing	Ford
33	Tony Raines (i)	Circle Sport	Chevrolet
34	David Ragan	Front Row Motorsports	Ford
35	Josh Wise (i)	Front Row Motorsports	Ford
36	J. J. Yeley	Tommy Baldwin Racing	Chevrolet
38	David Gilliland	Front Row Motorsports	Ford
39	Ryan Newman	Stewart–Haas Racing	Chevrolet
40	Landon Cassill (i)	Circle Sport	Chevrolet
42	Juan Pablo Montoya	Earnhardt Ganassi Racing	Chevrolet
43	Aric Almirola	Richard Petty Motorsports	Ford
47	Bobby Labonte	JTG Daugherty Racing	Toyota
48	Jimmie Johnson	Hendrick Motorsports	Chevrolet
51	Ryan Truex (i)	Phoenix Racing	Chevrolet
55	Brian Vickers (i)	Michael Waltrip Racing	Toyota
56	Martin Truex Jr.	Michael Waltrip Racing	Toyota
78	Kurt Busch	Furniture Row Racing	Chevrolet
83	David Reutimann	BK Racing	Toyota
87	Joe Nemechek (i)	NEMCO-Jay Robinson Racing	Toyota
88	Dale Earnhardt Jr.	Hendrick Motorsports	Chevrolet
93	Travis Kvapil	BK Racing	Toyota
95	Scott Speed	Leavine Family Racing	Ford
98	Michael McDowell	Phil Parsons Racing	Ford
99	Carl Edwards	Roush Fenway Racing	Ford
Official entry list

Denny Hamlin took the pole and led the first 22 laps. After being passed by Kurt Busch, Hamlin would fall back to mid-field. Busch would lead most of the laps until lap 81, when he came down pit road for a loose wheel and was given a pass-through for speeding. Carl Edwards and Dale Earnhardt Jr. shared the lead during the next two stints, before Clint Bowyer passed Earnhardt for the lead on lap 126. Bowyer led until getting spun on lap 176, causing the fourth caution. Edwards retook the lead, showing the way until being passed by Matt Kenseth on lap 236. After a lap 259 debris caution, Kenseth was caught speeding on pit road and relegated to the back, while Paul Menard stayed out to take the lead. Edwards once again claimed the lead on lap 322.

Kevin Harvick took the lead after the seventh caution on lap 335, but he was quickly passed by Edwards on lap 344. Edwards held the lead through two more cautions, but dropped a cylinder on lap 380 and blew his engine on lap 389. Kenseth held the lead through most of the final 120 laps and held off a final 10-lap charge by Kasey Kahne to score his fifth victory of the season. Juan Pablo Montoya finished third, and Brian Vickers and Joey Logano rounded out the top five. Eleven caution flags waved during the race, three of which were for debris. Drivers involved in seven, mostly minor, crashes included Ryan Truex, Josh Wise, Clint Bowyer, Tony Raines, Jimmie Johnson, David Reutimann, Aric Almirola, and Jeff Burton. The eleventh caution on lap 448, as Hamlin blew a tire and ran into Ryan Newman, causing a large crash also involving Brad Keselowski, Martin Truex Jr., Terry Labonte, David Stremme, Casey Mears, David Ragan and Kevin Harvick. After the crash, Harvick stopped for a few moments in Hamlin's pitbox preventing the #11 to access his box. Truex Jr. suffered a broken wrist after the accident.

=== Qualifying ===
Grid	No.	Driver	Team	Manufacturer	Speed	Time
1	11	Denny Hamlin	Joe Gibbs Racing	Toyota	128.969	14.878
2	78	Kurt Busch	Furniture Row Racing	Chevrolet	128.770	14.901
3	99	Carl Edwards	Roush Fenway Racing	Ford	128.692	14.910
4	55	Brian Vickers	Michael Waltrip Racing	Toyota	128.684	14.911
5	20	Matt Kenseth	Joe Gibbs Racing	Toyota	128.580	14.923
6	22	Joey Logano	Penske Racing	Ford	128.520	14.930
7	5	Kasey Kahne	Hendrick Motorsports	Chevrolet	128.348	14.950
8	39	Ryan Newman	Stewart–Haas Racing	Chevrolet	128.236	14.963
9	56	Martin Truex Jr.	Michael Waltrip Racing	Toyota	128.159	14.972
10	43	Aric Almirola	Richard Petty Motorsports	Ford	128.134	14.975
11	14	Mark Martin	Stewart–Haas Racing	Chevrolet	127.852	15.008
12	2	Brad Keselowski	Penske Racing	Ford	127.741	15.021
13	48	Jimmie Johnson	Hendrick Motorsports	Chevrolet	127.665	15.030
14	9	Marcos Ambrose	Richard Petty Motorsports	Ford	127.622	15.035
15	29	Kevin Harvick	Richard Childress Racing	Chevrolet	127.588	15.039
16	42	Juan Pablo Montoya	Earnhardt Ganassi Racing	Chevrolet	127.546	15.044
17	34	David Ragan	Front Row Motorsports	Ford	127.529	15.046
18	51	Ryan Truex	Phoenix Racing	Chevrolet	127.393	15.062
19	88	Dale Earnhardt Jr.	Hendrick Motorsports	Chevrolet	127.048	15.103
20	1	Jamie McMurray	Earnhardt Ganassi Racing	Chevrolet	126.813	15.131
21	27	Paul Menard	Richard Childress Racing	Chevrolet	126.787	15.134
22	10	Danica Patrick	Stewart–Haas Racing	Chevrolet	126.587	15.158
23	47	Bobby Labonte	JTG Daugherty Racing	Toyota	126.578	15.159
24	15	Clint Bowyer	Michael Waltrip Racing	Toyota	126.495	15.169
25	38	David Gilliland	Front Row Motorsports	Ford	126.470	15.172
26	98	Michael McDowell	Phil Parsons Racing	Ford	126.362	15.185
27	17	Ricky Stenhouse Jr.	Roush Fenway Racing	Ford	126.278	15.195
28	35	Josh Wise	Front Row Motorsports	Ford	126.245	15.199
29	16	Greg Biffle	Roush-Fenway Racing	Ford	126.195	15.205
30	13	Casey Mears	Germain Racing	Ford	125.798	15.253
31	83	David Reutimann	BK Racing	Toyota	125.757	15.258
32	24	Jeff Gordon	Hendrick Motorsports	Chevrolet	125.749	15.259
33	40	Landon Cassill	Circle Sport	Chevrolet	125.338	15.309
34	36	J. J. Yeley	Tommy Baldwin Racing	Chevrolet	125.036	15.346
35	32	Ken Schrader	FAS Lane Racing	Ford	125.011	15.349
36	7	Dave Blaney	Tommy Baldwin Racing	Chevrolet	124.995	15.351
37	87	Joe Nemechek	NEMCO-Jay Robinson Racing	Toyota	124.922	15.360
38	30	David Stremme	Swan Racing	Toyota	124.678	15.390
39	93	Travis Kvapil	BK Racing	Toyota	124.517	15.410
40	33	Tony Raines	Circle Sport	Chevrolet	124.162	15.454
41	31	Jeff Burton	Richard Childress Racing	Chevrolet	124.090	15.463
42	95	Scott Speed	Leavine Family Racing	Ford	123.570	15.528
43	18	Kyle Busch	Joe Gibbs Racing	Toyota	58.688	32.695
Failed to Qualify
DNQ	19	Mike Bliss	Humphrey-Smith Racing	Toyota	124.865	15.367
Qualifying results

=== Race results ===
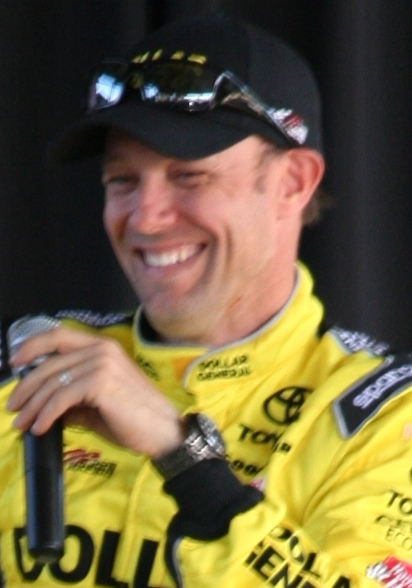
Matt Kenseth won the race.

Pos	No.	Driver	Team	Manufacturer	Laps	Race Status	Led	Points
1	20	Matt Kenseth	Joe Gibbs Racing	Toyota	500	Running	149	48
2	5	Kasey Kahne	Hendrick Motorsports	Chevrolet	500	Running	0	42
3	42	Juan Pablo Montoya	Earnhardt Ganassi Racing	Chevrolet	500	Running	0	41
4	55	Brian Vickers	Michael Waltrip Racing	Toyota	500	Running	0	0^{[2]}
5	22	Joey Logano	Penske Racing	Ford	500	Running	0	39
6	27	Paul Menard	Richard Childress Racing	Chevrolet	500	Running	64	39
7	24	Jeff Gordon	Hendrick Motorsports	Chevrolet	500	Running	0	37
8	9	Marcos Ambrose	Richard Petty Motorsports	Ford	500	Running	0	36
9	16	Greg Biffle	Roush Fenway Racing	Ford	500	Running	0	35
10	88	Dale Earnhardt Jr.	Hendrick Motorsports	Chevrolet	500	Running	32	35
11	18	Kyle Busch	Joe Gibbs Racing	Toyota	500	Running	0	33
12	34	David Ragan	Front Row Motorsports	Ford	500	Running	0	32
13	31	Jeff Burton	Richard Childress Racing	Chevrolet	500	Running	0	31
14	15	Clint Bowyer	Michael Waltrip Racing	Toyota	500	Running	50	31
15	43	Aric Almirola	Richard Petty Motorsports	Ford	499	Running	0	29
16	93	Travis Kvapil	BK Racing	Toyota	499	Running	0	28
17	30	David Stremme	Swan Racing	Toyota	498	Running	0	27
18	17	Ricky Stenhouse Jr.	Roush Fenway Racing	Ford	497	Running	0	26
19	1	Jamie McMurray	Earnhardt Ganassi Racing	Chevrolet	497	Running	0	25
20	14	Mark Martin	Stewart–Haas Racing	Chevrolet	497	Running	0	24
21	39	Ryan Newman	Stewart–Haas Racing	Chevrolet	497	Running	0	23
22	7	Dave Blaney	Tommy Baldwin Racing	Chevrolet	497	Running	0	22
23	40	Landon Cassill	Circle Sport	Chevrolet	497	Running	0	0^{[2]}
24	36	J. J. Yeley	Tommy Baldwin Racing	Chevrolet	496	Running	0	20
25	38	David Gilliland	Front Row Motorsports	Ford	495	Running	0	19
26	10	Danica Patrick	Stewart–Haas Racing	Chevrolet	493	Running	0	18
27	32	Ken Schrader	FAS Lane Racing	Ford	491	Running	0	17
28	11	Denny Hamlin	Joe Gibbs Racing	Toyota	487	Running	23	17
29	83	David Reutimann	BK Racing	Toyota	483	Running	0	15
30	2	Brad Keselowski	Penske Racing	Ford	478	Running	0	14
31	78	Kurt Busch	Furniture Row Racing	Chevrolet	476	Running	54	14
32	33	Tony Raines	Circle Sport	Chevrolet	475	Running	0	0^{[2]}
33	13	Casey Mears	Germain Racing	Ford	467	Running	0	11
34	29	Kevin Harvick	Richard Childress Racing	Chevrolet	449	Running	7	11
35	56	Martin Truex Jr.	Michael Waltrip Racing	Toyota	446	Crash	2	10
36	48	Jimmie Johnson	Hendrick Motorsports	Chevrolet	440	Running	0	8
37	35	Josh Wise	Front Row Motorsports	Ford	418	Running	0	0^{[2]}
38	47	Bobby Labonte	JTG Daugherty Racing	Toyota	394	Running	0	6
39	99	Carl Edwards	Roush Fenway Racing	Ford	387	Engine	119	6
40	95	Scott Speed	Leavine Family Racing	Ford	223	Brakes	0	4
41	98	Michael McDowell	Phil Parsons Racing	Ford	175	Engine	0	3
42	51	Ryan Truex	Phoenix Racing	Chevrolet	39	Crash	0	0^{[2]}
43	87	Joe Nemechek	NEMCO-Jay Robinson Racing	Toyota	1	Engine	0	0^{[2]}
Race Results

=== Notes ===
1. ^1 Points include 3 Chase for the Sprint Cup points for winning, 1 point for leading a lap, and 1 point for most laps led.
2. ^{a} ^{b} ^{c} ^{d} ^{e} ^{f} Ineligible for driver's championship points.

== Standings after the race ==
Drivers' Championship standings

Pos	Driver	Points
1	Jimmie Johnson	821
2	Clint Bowyer	803 (-18)
3	Carl Edwards	768 (-53)
4	Kevin Harvick	760 (-61)
5	Kyle Busch	739 (-82)

Manufacturers' Championship standings

Pos	Manufacturer	Points
1	Chevrolet	168
2	Toyota	157 (-11)
3	Ford	124 (-44)

- Note: Only the first twelve positions are included for the driver standings.

Previous race: 2013 Pure Michigan 400	Sprint Cup Series; 2013 season	Next race: 2013 AdvoCare 500
