= Ryan Truex =

American racing driver (born 1992)

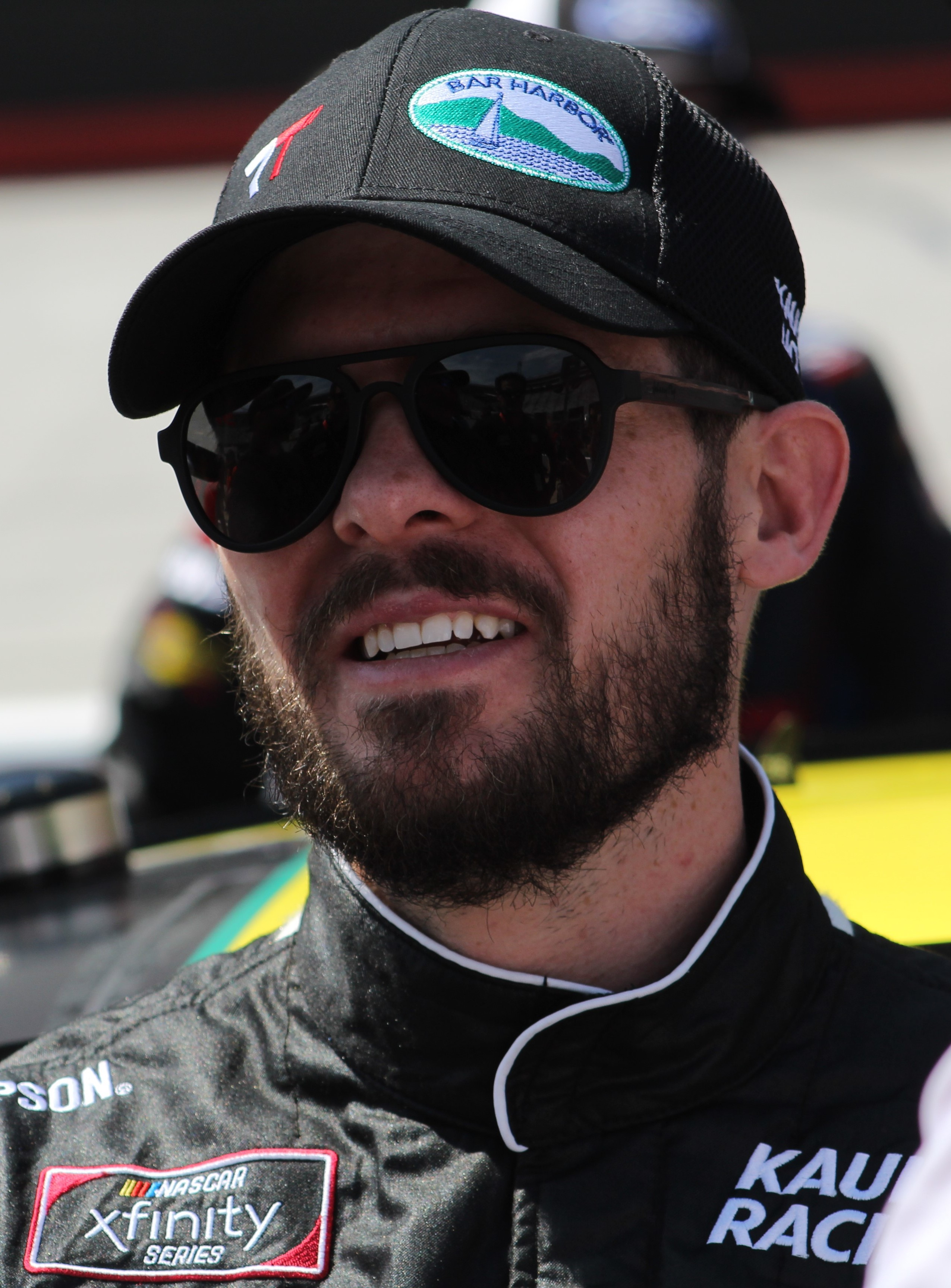
- Truex at Bristol Motor Speedway in 2018
- Born: Ryan Matthew Truex; March 18, 1992 (age 34); Mayetta, New Jersey, U.S.
- Achievements: 2009 Camping World East Series champion 2010 K&N Pro Series East champion

NASCAR Cup Series career
- 27 races run over 3 years
- 2025 position: 53rd
- Best finish: 39th (2014)
- First race: 2013 Irwin Tools Night Race (Bristol)
- Last race: 2025 Viva México 250 (Mexico City)
Wins	Top tens	Poles
0	0	0

NASCAR O'Reilly Auto Parts Series career
- 103 races run over 10 years
- 2025 position: 46th
- Best finish: 12th (2018)
- First race: 2010 Missouri-Illinois Dodge Dealers 250 (Gateway)
- Last race: 2025 BetRivers 200 (Dover)
- First win: 2023 A-GAME 200 (Dover)
- Last win: 2024 Wawa 250 (Daytona)
Wins	Top tens	Poles
3	36	1

NASCAR FedEx Freight Truck Series career
- 73 races run over 7 years
- 2021 position: 16th
- Best finish: 9th (2017)
- First race: 2012 Kroger 200 (Martinsville)
- Last race: 2021 Lucas Oil 150 (Phoenix)
Wins	Top tens	Poles
0	22	2

ARCA Menards Series East career
- 24 races run over 4 years
- Best finish: 1st (2009, 2010)
- First race: 2008 Carquest Fall Final 150 (Stafford)
- Last race: 2017 Finger Lakes Wine Country 100 (Watkins Glen)
- First win: 2009 Tioga Downs Casino 125 at The Glen (Watkins Glen)
- Last win: 2010 New Hampshire 125 (New Hampshire)
Wins	Top tens	Poles
5	17	3
- Statistics up to date as of November 6, 2025.

Ryan Matthew Truex (born March 18, 1992) is an American professional stock car racing driver. He last competed part-time in the NASCAR Xfinity Series, driving the No. 24 Toyota GR Supra for Sam Hunt Racing. As a reserve driver for Joe Gibbs Racing in the Cup and Xfinity Series, he also last competed part-time in the NASCAR Cup Series, driving No. 11 Toyota Camry XSE for JGR.

Truex's older brother Martin was the 2017 NASCAR Cup Series champion.

== Racing career ==
=== Early career ===
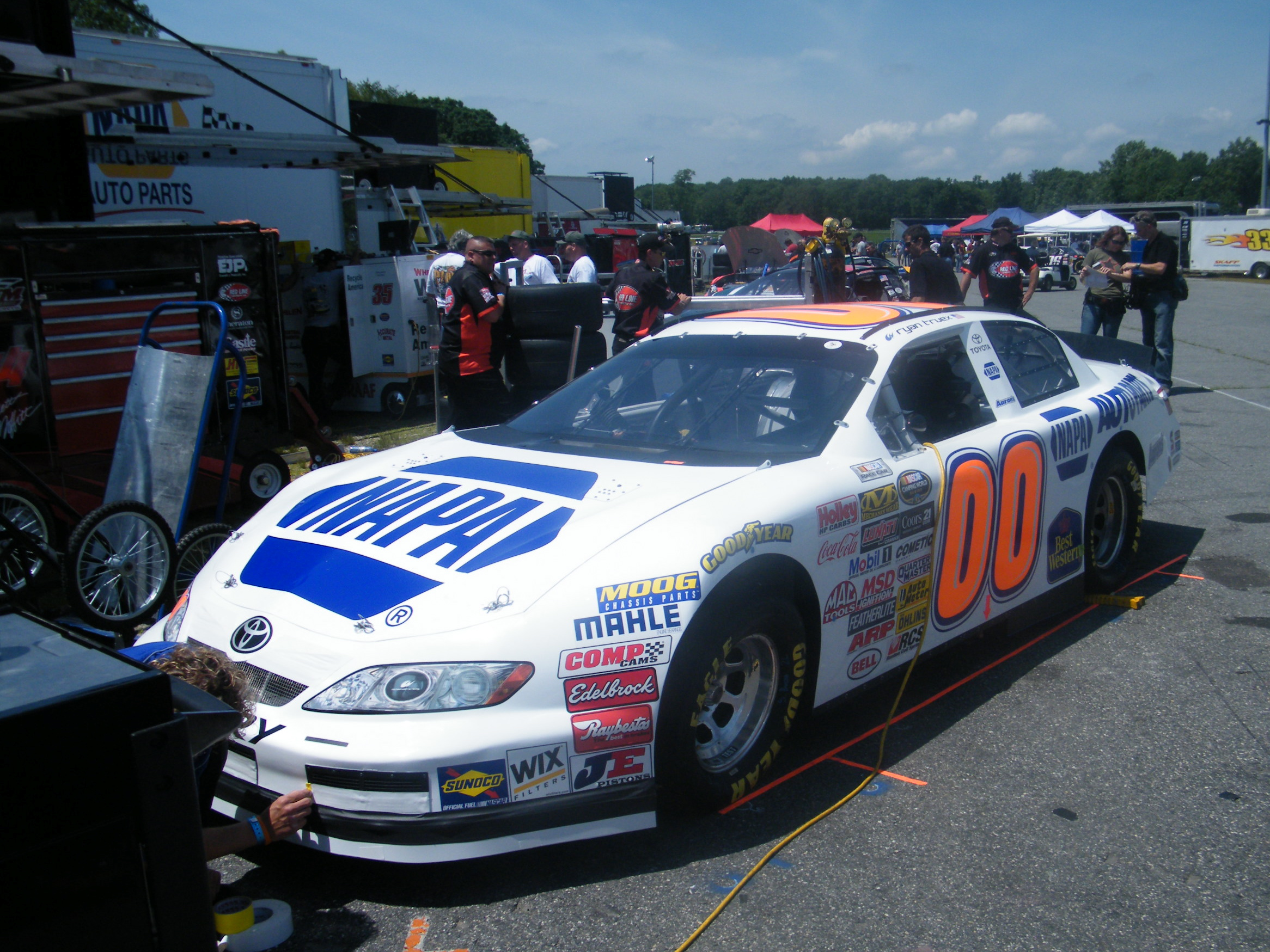
Truex's CW East championship car

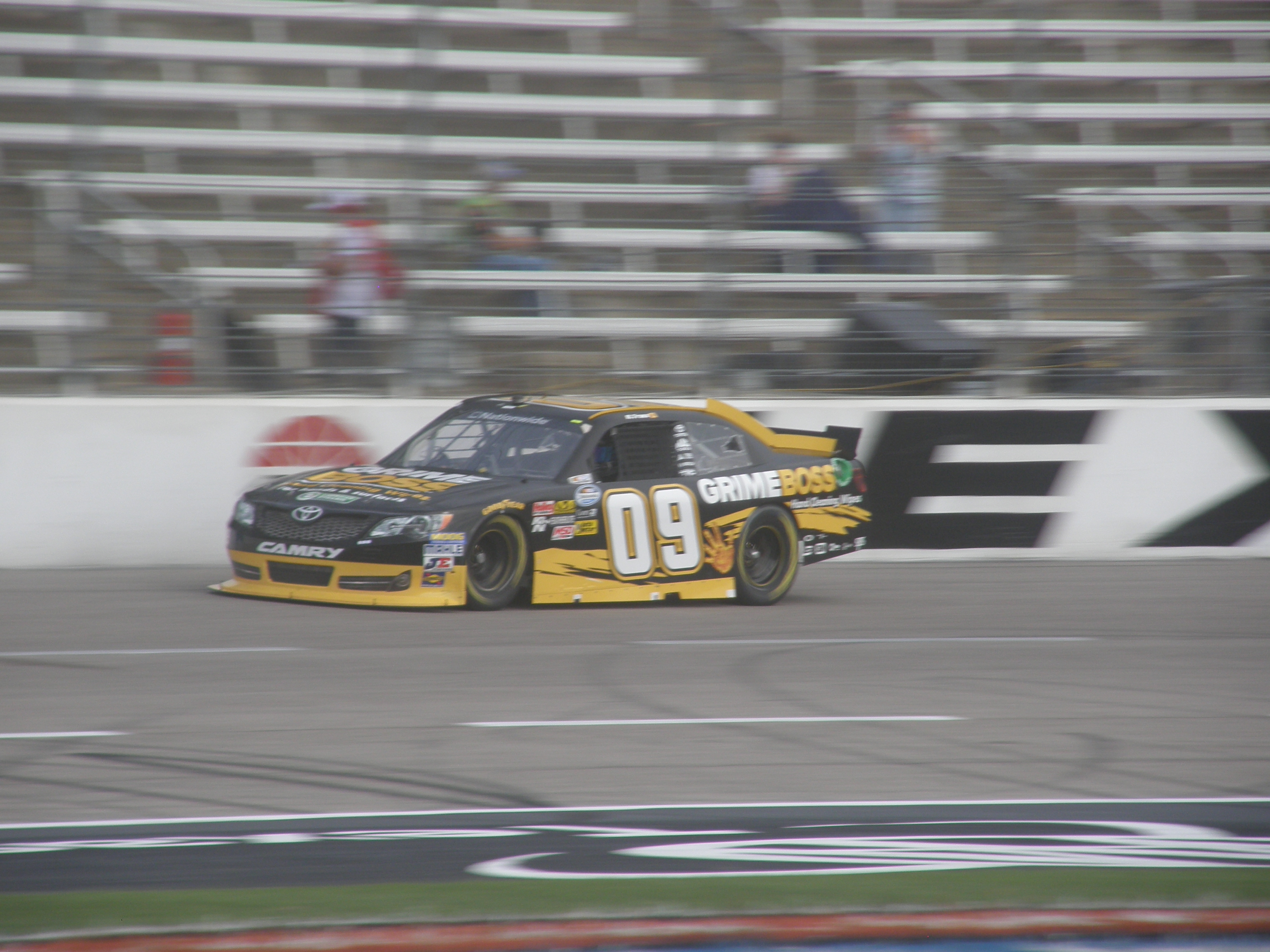
Truex in 2012 at Texas Motor Speedway

A native of Mayetta, New Jersey, Truex would make his East Series debut in 2008 at Stafford Motor Speedway in the No. 8 car for Dale Earnhardt, Inc. Truex won the 2009 NASCAR Camping World East Series Championship as a seventeen-year-old high school student at Southern Regional High School.

In the eleven-race season, Truex finished the season with eight top-fives. He had three wins at Watkins Glen, Thompson, and Lime Rock Park.

In 2010, Truex won his second consecutive Camping World East Series title in a Michael Waltrip-owned Toyota.

=== Touring series ===
Truex competed in six NASCAR Nationwide Series events, beginning at Gateway International Raceway on July 17, 2010. Truex was intended to run for Rookie of the Year in 2011 with MWR. However, motocross stunt performer Travis Pastrana ran the No. 99 for seven races. Truex planned to skip ROTY and run ten consecutive races in the Nationwide Series, then twenty races in 2012, though surgery forced him out of the No. 99 at Texas and was replaced by David Reutimann and team owner Waltrip, who drove at the restrictor plate tracks. Waltrip and Ryan's brother Martin also split time in the ride.

Due to a lack of sponsorship in the 99 team, Truex was released from Pastrana Waltrip Racing after the STP 300. Truex returned to the Nationwide Series with Joe Gibbs Racing, running several races late in the 2011 season. In 2012, he drove for Tommy Baldwin Racing in the season-opening DRIVE4COPD 300 at Daytona International Speedway, finishing 31st. He ran a limited schedule for JGR, while he also drove for RAB Racing at Texas Motor Speedway in April.

On June 2, 2012, Truex got a career best finish of second at Dover International Speedway driving for JGR. Racing shortly after an emergency appendectomy, he started the race first after winning his first career Nationwide Series pole, and led late before being caught in lapped traffic by Joey Logano.

=== National series ===
In February 2013, Truex announced that he would compete in the Camping World Truck Series for Turner Scott Motorsports at Daytona International Speedway; he hoped to compete in further races during the year and registered to compete for the series' Rookie of the Year title. In addition, he signed with Phoenix Racing to compete in the Sprint Cup Series, competing in at least one race at Richmond International Raceway, as well as at Indianapolis Motor Speedway for the team in the Nationwide Series; his debut in the Sprint Cup Series and his Nationwide Series race was later delayed due to Truex suffering a broken collarbone.

On June 2, 2013, it was announced that Truex had signed with Richard Petty Motorsports as a development driver; in mid-July it was announced that he would make his Sprint Cup debut with Phoenix Racing in the Irwin Tools Night Race at Bristol Motor Speedway driving James Finch's No. 51. After Harry Scott Jr.'s takeover of the No. 51 team two weeks later, Truex drove for Scott in his first race as team owner at Richmond International Raceway. He drove for Scott again at his home track of Dover International Speedway, finishing 32nd.

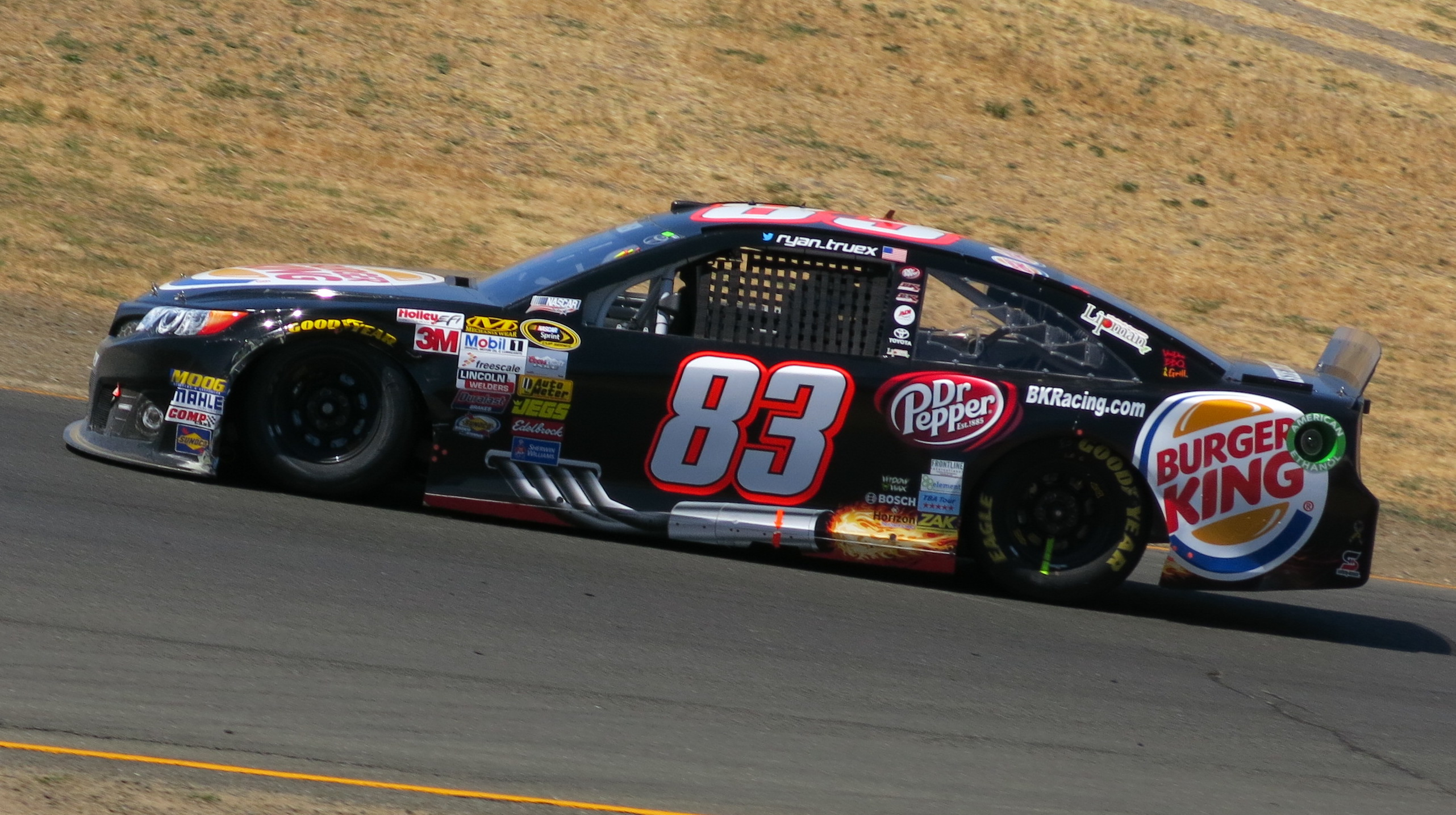
Truex's 2014 Cup Series car at Sonoma Raceway

In January 2014, Truex drove for BK Racing during testing prior to the 2014 Daytona 500 in the No. 93. He was later assigned to the team's No. 83 for the full season. Truex also drove the No. 32 Bass Pro Shops Chevrolet for Turner Scott Motorsports in the season-opening Camping World Truck Series race at Daytona International Speedway. In August he suffered a sprained wrist and concussion in a practice crash at Michigan International Speedway; he was forced to sit out that weekend's race, being replaced by J. J. Yeley.

In September, Truex was replaced in the No. 83 car by Travis Kvapil in races at New Hampshire Motor Speedway and Dover International Speedway; discussions about his position with the team for the remainder of the season were said to be "ongoing". During the race weekend at Dover, Truex confirmed that he was no longer with BK Racing. After receiving no rides in 2015, Truex was picked up by Biagi-DenBeste Racing to drive three races starting at Richmond in the Xfinity Series.

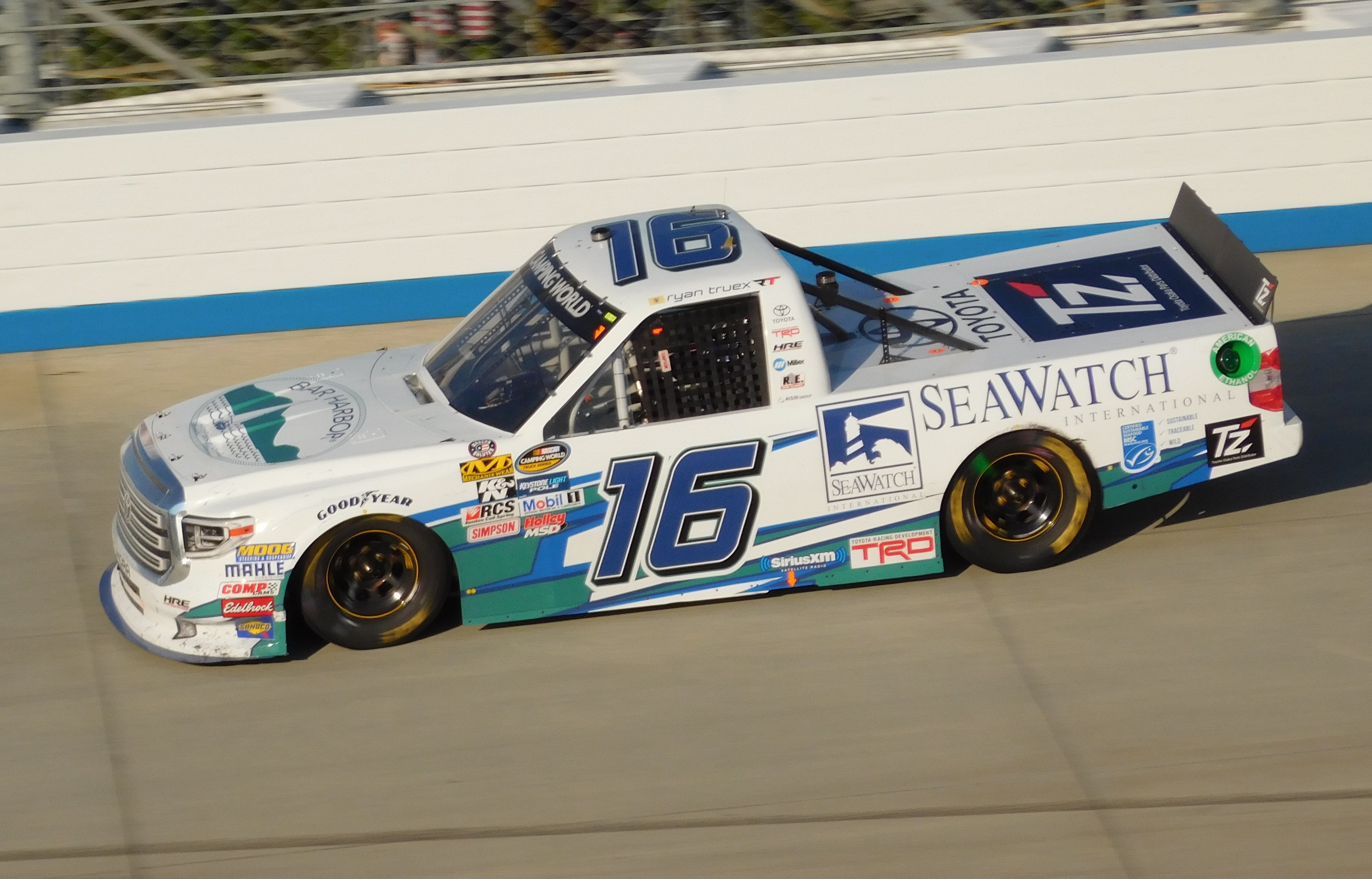
Truex's 2017 truck at Dover

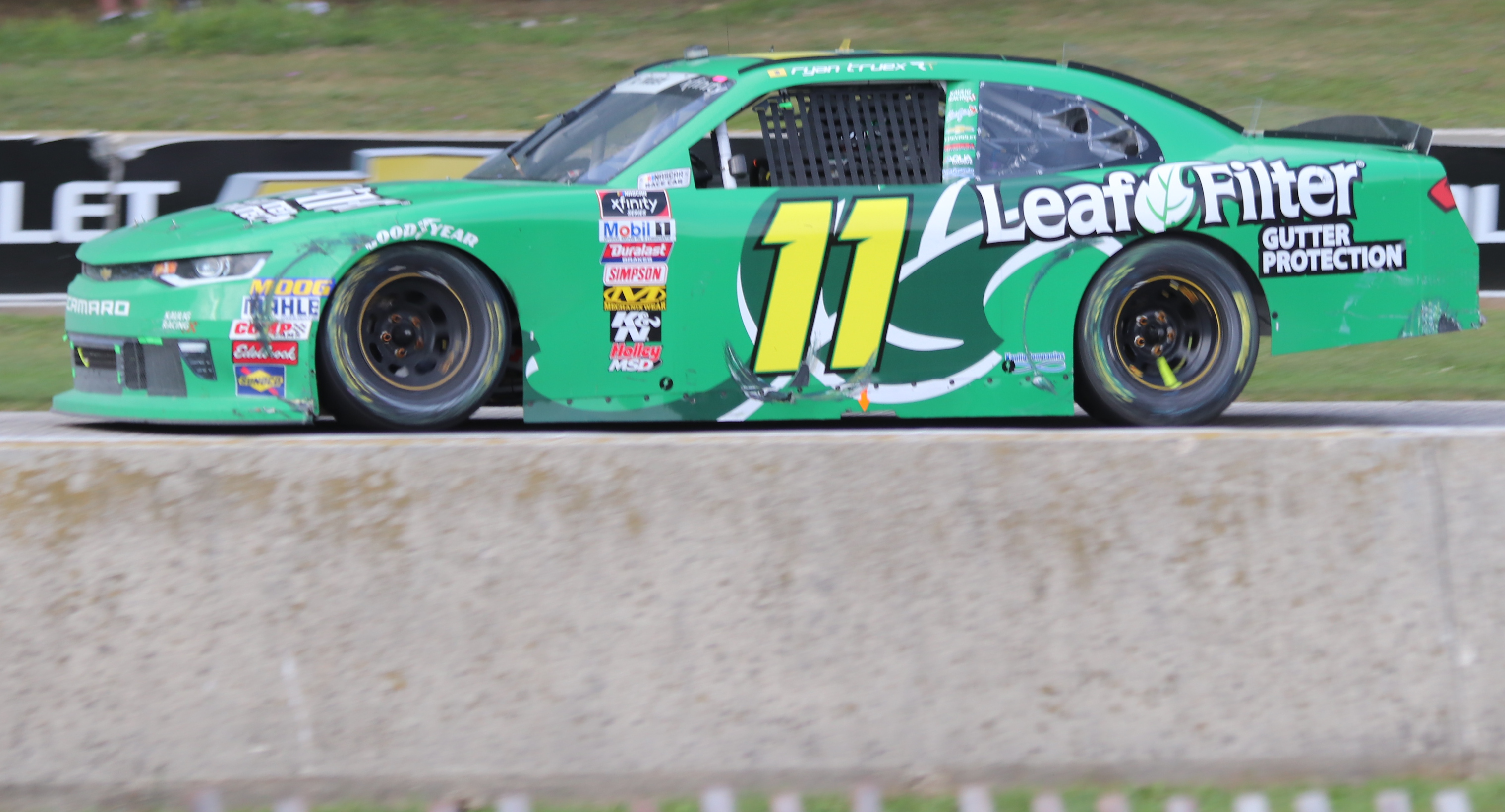
Truex's 2018 car at Road America

After not finding a ride in 2015, in 2016, Truex returned to the Truck Series for the season opener at Daytona, driving the No. 81 for Hattori Racing Enterprises. Truex ran in the top-ten for a portion of the race, and was in the lead on the last lap when he lost support from Parker Kligerman. After finishing second, he announced he was running Atlanta, Martinsville, Kansas, and hoped to run the whole season. However, sponsorship had been an issue for the team, he was replaced by Jesse Little for Texas, and was reduced to a limited schedule for the rest of the year. But Truex returned to HRE in 2017, now running the full Truck schedule in the renumbered No. 16. After finishing ninth in points with thirteen top-ten finishes (including eight in the top five) and two poles, he was released by HRE on January 4, 2018. His jobless status would not last long, as he signed with Kaulig Racing to drive their flagship No. 11 car in the NASCAR Xfinity Series for 2018 with sponsorship from partner Bar Harbor Foods. With one top-five and eleven top-ten finishes, Truex finished twelfth in points after being eliminated after the Round Of 12.

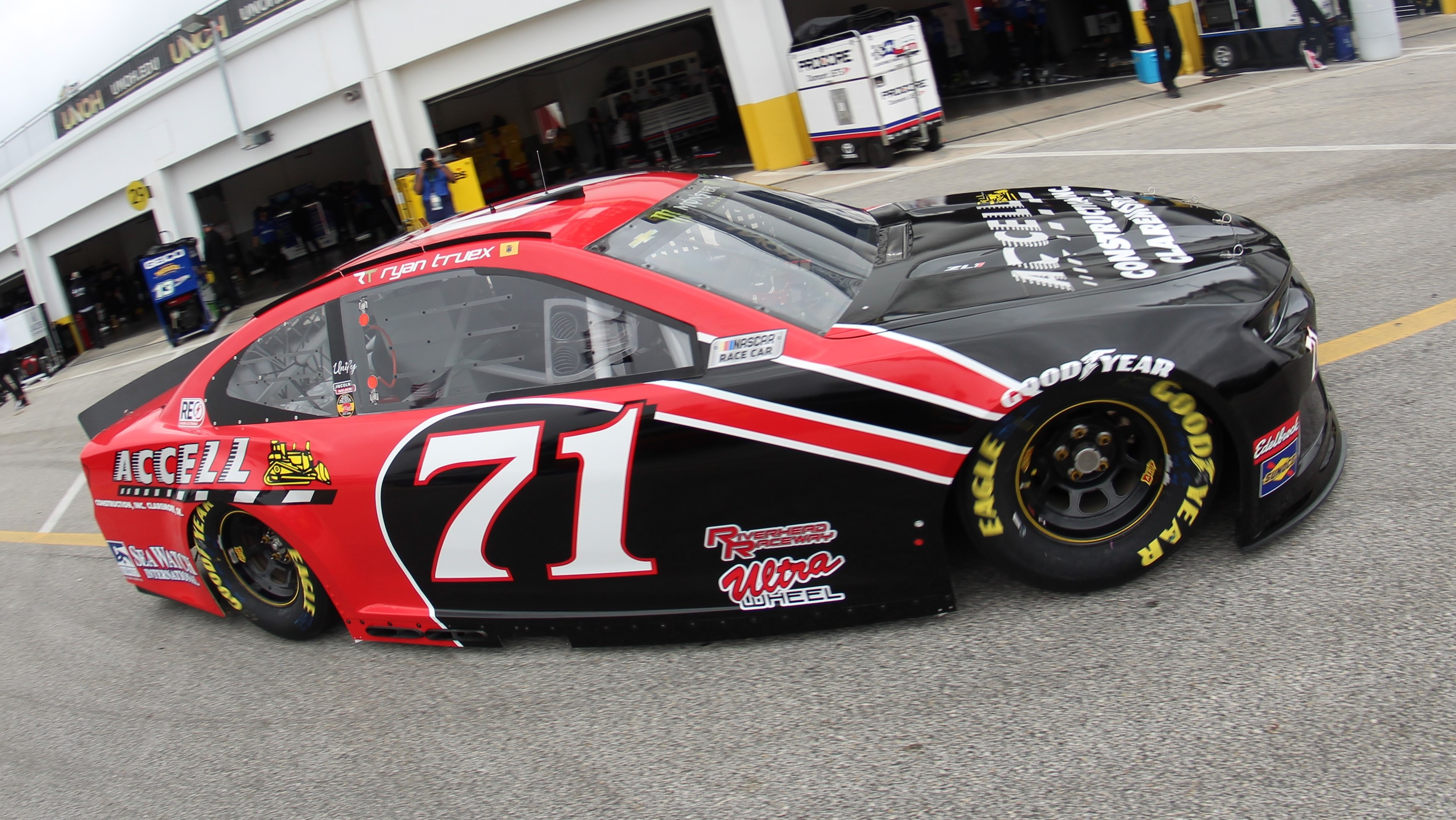
Truex's 2019 Daytona 500 car

Truex lost his ride with Kaulig when Justin Haley was announced as his successor in the No. 11 for 2019. On January 16, Truex announced he would enter the Daytona 500 with Tommy Baldwin Racing, driving the No. 71. On January 25, 2019, it was announced that Truex would drive the No. 8 car for JR Motorsports part-time. Truex cold-texted team owner Dale Earnhardt Jr. to inquire about open rides in the offseason and was able to find a large enough budget to run part-time in the No. 8. In his first race with the team at Phoenix he scored his first top-five since Mid-Ohio by tying his best-career finish of second.

In 2020, Truex returned to the Truck Series as he signed a six-race deal with Niece Motorsports starting with the Texas race in March. Truex initially sought a full-time ride with the team but was unable to bring enough sponsorship to secure a full season. After running nine races in 2020, with a best finish of twelfth at Las Vegas and Kansas, Truex upgraded to a full-time schedule with Niece for the 2021 season.

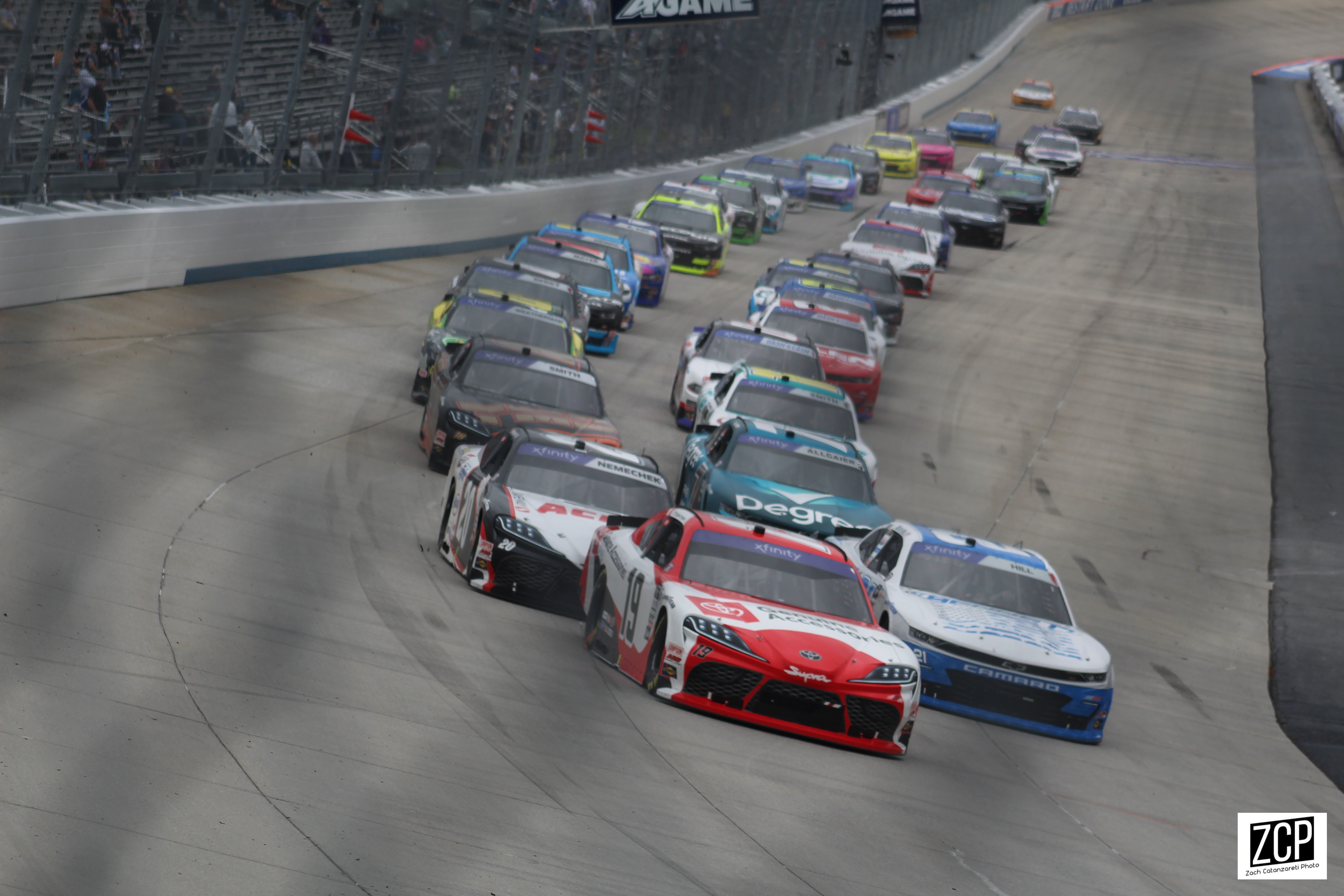
Truex (No. 19) leads the pack in a restart in the 2023 Xfinity Series race at Dover which he would go on to win.

Truex returned to the Xfinity Series, driving the Joe Gibbs Racing No. 18 on a part-time basis in 2022. He was scheduled to run only five races in 2022 but Auto-Owners Insurance (which sponsors his brother Martin’s No. 19 Cup car) joined him last minute for a race at Atlanta Motor Speedway. His best finish that season was third at Atlanta. He would return to the renumbered No. 19 car in 2023 after Sammy Smith would move to the No. 18 full-time. Truex would finish second at Phoenix Raceway to his teammate, Smith. He scored his first career win at Dover, the site of his brother, Martin’s first Cup Series win in 2007. Martin won the Cup race two days later, becoming the fifth set of brothers to win on the same race weekend.

For 2024, Truex returned to JGR part-time, alternating between the No. 19 and No. 20 teams. He brought the No. 20 to victory lane at Dover. Truex scored his second win of the season at the Daytona summer race. He returned to Sam Hunt Racing to drive their No. 26 car in the race at Homestead-Miami for the first time since the season-opener at Daytona in 2022.

In 2025, Truex was a reserve driver for Joe Gibbs Racing's Cup and Xfinity teams. In the Cup Series, he would fill in for Denny Hamlin in the No. 11 Toyota at Mexico City after Hamlin's fiancée had given birth to their third child. This was Truex's first Cup Series start since 2014. He started 36th and finished 23rd.

In the Xfinity Series, Truex would make two starts at Daytona in February and Dover, driving the No. 24 Toyota for Sam Hunt Racing.

== Personal life ==
Truex is the younger brother of 2017 Cup Series champion and two-time Busch Series champion Martin Truex Jr., and the son of former Busch Series driver Martin Truex Sr.

== Motorsports career results ==
=== NASCAR ===
(key) (Bold – Pole position awarded by qualifying time. Italics – Pole position earned by points standings or practice time. * – Most laps led.)

==== Cup Series ====
NASCAR Cup Series results
Year	Team	No.	Make	1	2	3	4	5	6	7	8	9	10	11	12	13	14	15	16	17	18	19	20	21	22	23	24	25	26	27	28	29	30	31	32	33	34	35	36	NCSC	Pts	Ref
2013	Phoenix Racing	51	Chevy	DAY	PHO	LVS	BRI	CAL	MAR	TEX	KAN	RCH	TAL	DAR	CLT	DOV	POC	MCH	SON	KEN	DAY	NHA	IND	POC	GLN	MCH	BRI; 42	ATL	RCH; 35	CHI	NHA	DOV; 32	KAN	CLT	TAL	MAR	TEX	PHO	HOM	68th	0^{1}	
2014	BK Racing	83	Toyota	DAY; DNQ	PHO; 35	LVS; 35	BRI; 42	CAL; 31	MAR; 30	TEX; DNQ	DAR; 40	RCH; 31	TAL; 31	KAN; 43	CLT; 38	DOV; 32	POC; 32	MCH; DNQ	SON; 41	KEN; 33	DAY; 32	NHA; 36	IND; 41	POC; 20	GLN; 39	MCH; INQ^{†}	BRI; 37	ATL; 36	RCH; 42	CHI; 42	NHA	DOV	KAN	CLT	TAL	MAR	TEX	PHO	HOM	39th	193	
2019	Tommy Baldwin Racing	71	Chevy	DAY; DNQ	ATL	LVS	PHO	CAL	MAR	TEX	BRI	RCH	TAL	DOV	KAN	CLT	POC	MCH	SON	CHI	DAY	KEN	NHA	POC	GLN	MCH	BRI	DAR	IND	LVS	RCH	ROV	DOV	TAL	KAN	MAR	TEX	PHO	HOM	65th	0^{1}	
2025	Joe Gibbs Racing	11	Toyota	DAY	ATL	COA	PHO	LVS	HOM	MAR	DAR	BRI	TAL	TEX	KAN	CLT	NSH	MCH	MXC; 23	POC	ATL	CSC	SON	DOV	IND	IOW	GLN	RCH	DAY	DAR	GTW	BRI	NHA	KAN	ROV	LVS	TAL	MAR	PHO	53rd	0^{1}	
^{†} – Qualified but replaced by J. J. Yeley

===== Daytona 500 =====
Year	Team	Manufacturer	Start	Finish
2014	BK Racing	Toyota	DNQ	
2019	Tommy Baldwin Racing	Chevrolet	DNQ	

==== Xfinity Series ====
NASCAR Xfinity Series results
Year	Team	No.	Make	1	2	3	4	5	6	7	8	9	10	11	12	13	14	15	16	17	18	19	20	21	22	23	24	25	26	27	28	29	30	31	32	33	34	35	NXSC	Pts	Ref
2010	Diamond-Waltrip Racing	00	Toyota	DAY	CAL	LVS	BRI	NSH	PHO	TEX	TAL	RCH	DAR	DOV	CLT	NSH	KEN	ROA	NHA	DAY	CHI	GTW; 28	IRP	IOW	GLN	MCH; 12	BRI	CGV	ATL	RCH; 26	DOV								60th	673	
2010	Diamond-Waltrip Racing	99	Toyota																													KAN; 15	CAL	CLT; 37	GTW; 15	TEX	PHO; 23	HOM	60th	673	
2011	Pastrana-Waltrip Racing	99	Toyota	DAY	PHO; 14	LVS; 19	BRI; 20	CAL; 17	TEX	TAL	NSH; 16	RCH; 8	DAR; 25	DOV; 18	IOW; 34	CLT	CHI; 20	MCH	ROA	DAY	KEN	NHA	NSH	IRP	IOW	GLN	CGV	BRI						CLT; 34	TEX				22nd	459	
2011	Joe Gibbs Racing	20	Toyota																										ATL; 11	RCH; 4	CHI; 13	DOV; 8	KAN; 10			PHO; 8	HOM		22nd	459	
2012	Tommy Baldwin Racing	36	Chevy	DAY; 31	PHO	LVS																																	23rd	298	
2012	Joe Gibbs Racing	20	Toyota				BRI; 10	CAL			TAL; 11	DAR	IOW	CLT	**DOV**; 2	MCH	ROA	KEN	DAY					GLN; 15	CGV	BRI	ATL									HOM; 38			23rd	298	
2012	RAB Racing	09	Toyota						TEX; 32	RCH																													23rd	298	
2012	Joe Gibbs Racing	18	Toyota																	NHA; 10	CHI; 10	IND	IOW																23rd	298	
2012	RAB Racing	99	Toyota																									RCH; 14	CHI	KEN	DOV; 16	CLT	KAN	TEX	PHO				23rd	298	
2013	Richard Petty Motorsports	9	Ford	DAY	PHO	LVS	BRI	CAL	TEX	RCH	TAL	DAR	CLT	DOV	IOW	MCH	ROA	KEN	DAY	NHA	CHI	IND	IOW	GLN	MOH; QL^{†}	BRI	ATL	RCH	CHI	KEN	DOV	KAN	CLT	TEX	PHO	HOM			N/A	–	
2015	Biagi-DenBeste Racing	98	Ford	DAY	ATL	LVS	PHO	CAL	TEX	BRI	RCH	TAL	IOW	CLT	DOV	MCH	CHI	DAY	KEN	NHA	IND	IOW	GLN	MOH	BRI	ROA	DAR	RCH; 31	CHI	KEN; 28	DOV	CLT; 17	KAN	TEX; 20	PHO	HOM			43rd	80	
2018	Kaulig Racing	11	Chevy	DAY; 7	ATL; 9	LVS; 15	PHO; 15	CAL; 12	TEX; 13	BRI; 10	RCH; 7	TAL; 38	DOV; 11	CLT; 6	POC; 10	MCH; 10	IOW; 14	CHI; 15	DAY; 13	KEN; 13	NHA; 13	IOW; 8	GLN; 18	MOH; 5	BRI; 22	ROA; 25	DAR; 15	IND; 22	LVS; 8	RCH; 11	ROV; 16	DOV; 10	KAN; 11	TEX; 33	PHO; 13	HOM; 15			12th	2160	
2019	JR Motorsports	8	Chevy	DAY	ATL	LVS	PHO; 2	CAL	TEX	BRI	RCH	TAL	DOV	CLT	POC	MCH	IOW	CHI	DAY	KEN; 8	NHA; 7	IOW	GLN	MOH	BRI	ROA	DAR	IND	LVS; 14	RCH	ROV; 10	DOV	KAN; 38	TEX	PHO	HOM			33rd	169	
2022	Sam Hunt Racing	26	Toyota	DAY; 12	CAL																																		34th	162	
2022	Joe Gibbs Racing	18	Toyota			LVS; 30	PHO	ATL	COA	RCH	MAR; 7	TAL	DOV	DAR; 30	TEX; 6	CLT	PIR	NSH	ROA	ATL; 3	NHA	POC	IRC	MCH	GLN	DAY	DAR	KAN	BRI	TEX	TAL	ROV	LVS	HOM	MAR	PHO			34th	162	
2023	Joe Gibbs Racing	19	Toyota	DAY	CAL	LVS	PHO; 2	ATL; 3	COA	RCH	MAR; 12	TAL; 17	DOV; 1*	DAR; 35	CLT	PIR	SON	NSH	CSC	ATL	NHA	POC	ROA	MCH	IRC	GLN	DAY	DAR	KAN	BRI	TEX	ROV	LVS	HOM	MAR	PHO			31st	197	
2024	Joe Gibbs Racing	19	Toyota	DAY; 21	ATL; 9	LVS	PHO	COA	RCH	MAR																													28th	319	
2024	Joe Gibbs Racing	20	Toyota								TEX; 7	TAL; 34	DOV; 1	DAR	CLT	PIR; 27	SON	IOW	NHA	NSH	CSC	POC; 19	IND	MCH	DAY; 1	DAR	ATL; 10	GLN	BRI; 5	KAN	TAL	ROV	LVS						28th	319	
2024	Sam Hunt Racing	26	Toyota																															HOM; 21	MAR	PHO			28th	319	
2025	Sam Hunt Racing	24	Toyota	DAY; 17	ATL	COA	PHO	LVS	HOM	MAR	DAR	BRI	CAR	TAL	TEX	CLT	NSH	MXC	POC	ATL	CSC	SON	DOV; 18	IND	IOW	GLN	DAY	PIR	GTW	BRI	KAN	ROV	LVS	TAL	MAR	PHO			46th	39	
^{†} – Qualified for Marcos Ambrose

==== Camping World Truck Series ====
NASCAR Camping World Truck Series results
Year	Team	No.	Make	1	2	3	4	5	6	7	8	9	10	11	12	13	14	15	16	17	18	19	20	21	22	23	NCWTC	Pts	Ref
2012	Hillman Racing	27	Chevy	DAY	MAR	CAR	KAN	CLT	DOV	TEX	KEN	IOW	CHI	POC	MCH	BRI	ATL	IOW	KEN	LVS	TAL	MAR; 19	TEX	PHO; 9	HOM		90th	0^{1}	
2013	Turner Scott Motorsports	30	Chevy	DAY; 28	MAR	CAR	KAN	CLT	DOV	TEX	KEN	IOW	ELD	POC	MCH	BRI	MSP	IOW	CHI	LVS	TAL	MAR	TEX	PHO	HOM		73rd	16	
2014	Turner Scott Motorsports	32	Chevy	DAY; 4	MAR	KAN	CLT	DOV	TEX	GTW	KEN	IOW	ELD	POC	MCH	BRI	MSP	CHI	NHA	LVS	TAL	MAR	TEX	PHO	HOM		93rd	0^{1}	
2016	Hattori Racing Enterprises	81	Toyota	DAY; 2	ATL; 20	MAR; 12	KAN; 6	DOV; 8	CLT; 22	TEX	IOW	GTW; 26	KEN	ELD	POC	BRI	MCH; 23	MSP; 21	CHI; 15	NHA; 16	LVS	TAL; 8	MAR; 14	TEX; 21	PHO	HOM; 32	18th	250	
2017	Hattori Racing Enterprises	16	Toyota	DAY; 28	ATL; 13	MAR; 10	KAN; 6	CLT; 4	DOV; 10	TEX; 4	GTW; 7	IOW; 20	KEN; 23	ELD; 20	POC; 3	MCH; 4	BRI; 16	MSP; 5	**CHI**; 4	NHA; 2	**LVS**; 12	TAL; 28	MAR; 13	TEX; 8	PHO; 19	HOM; 4	9th	772	
2020	Niece Motorsports	40	Chevy	DAY	LVS	CLT	ATL; 13	HOM	POC	KEN; 27	TEX; 13	KAN	KAN	MCH; 19	DRC	DOV	GTW	DAR	RCH	BRI	LVS; 12	TAL	KAN; 12	TEX; 34	MAR; 30	PHO; 21	31st	157	
2021	Niece Motorsports	40	Chevy	DAY; 4	DRC; 31	LVS; 38	ATL; 15	BRD; 20	RCH; 40	KAN; 20	DAR; 11	COA; 20	CLT; 12	TEX; 16	NSH; 26	POC; 18	KNX; 13	GLN; 17	GTW; 13	DAR; 33	BRI; 16	LVS; 9	TAL; 5	MAR; 33	PHO; 19		16th	404	

^{*} Season still in progress
^{1} Ineligible for series points

==== K&N Pro Series East ====
NASCAR K&N Pro Series East results
Year	Team	No.	Make	1	2	3	4	5	6	7	8	9	10	11	12	13	14	NKNPSEC	Pts	Ref
2008	Dale Earnhardt, Inc.	8	Chevy	GRE	IOW	SBO	GLN	NHA	TMP	MCM	ADI	LRP	MFD	NHA	DOV	STA; 11		61st	130	
2009	Michael Waltrip Racing	00	Toyota	GRE; 14	TRI; 16	IOW; 19	**SBO**; 3	GLN; 1	**NHA**; 2	TMP; 1	ADI; 2	LRP; 1	NHA; 3	DOV; 8				1st	1719	
2010	Michael Waltrip Racing	00	Toyota	GRE; 14*	SBO; 3	IOW; 5	MAR; 2	NHA; 1*	LRP; 5	LEE; 2	JFC; 7	NHA; 1*	DOV; 3					1st	1662	
2017	Hattori Racing Enterprises	11	Toyota	NSM	GRE	BRI; 25	SBO	SBO	MEM	BLN	TMP	NHA	IOW					39th	46	
2017	Hattori Racing Enterprises	01	Toyota											**GLN**; 19	LGY	NJM	DOV	39th	46	

Sporting positions
Preceded by Matt Kobyluck	K&N Pro Series East champion 2009–2010	Succeeded by Max Gresham
