= 2014 Cheez-It 355 at The Glen =

22nd race of the 2014 NASCAR Sprint Cup series

Race details
- Race 22 of 36 in the 2014 NASCAR Sprint Cup Series
- The 2014 Cheez-It at The Glen program cover, featuring Carl Edwards.
- Date: August 10, 2014
- Location: Watkins Glen International, Watkins Glen, New York
- Course: Permanent racing facility
- Course length: 2.454 miles (3.943 km)
- Distance: 90 laps, 220.5 mi (354.9 km)
- Weather: Sunny with a temperature of 79 °F (26 °C) and wind out of the NNE at 4 miles per hour (6.4 km/h)
- Average speed: 90.123 mph (145.039 km/h)

Pole position
Driver	Jeff Gordon	Hendrick Motorsports
- Time: 68.126

Most laps led
Driver	A. J. Allmendinger; Jeff Gordon	JTG Daugherty Racing; Hendrick Motorsports
- Laps: 29

Winner
No. 47	A. J. Allmendinger	JTG Daugherty Racing

Television in the United States
- Network: ESPN & MRN
- Announcers: Allen Bestwick, Dale Jarrett and Andy Petree (Television); Joe Moore and Jeff Striegle (Booth); Dave Moody (2, 3, 4), Mike Bagley (Back straight, inner loop, outer loop) and Buddy Long (10 & 11) (Turns) (Radio)
- Nielsen ratings: 3.1/8 (Final); 2.9/7 (Overnight); 4.939 Million viewers

The 2014 Cheez-It 355 at The Glen was a NASCAR Sprint Cup Series stock car race that was held on August 10, 2014, at Watkins Glen International in Watkins Glen, New York. Contested over 90 laps on the 2.45 miles (3.94 kilometres) road course, it was the 22nd race of the 2014 NASCAR Sprint Cup Series. A. J. Allmendinger won the race, his first career Sprint Cup victory. Marcos Ambrose finished second while Kurt Busch, Kyle Larson (the highest finishing rookie) and Carl Edwards rounded out the top five. Behind Larson, the top rookies of the race were Austin Dillon in 16th, just ahead of Justin Allgaier.

== Report ==
=== Background ===
The layout of Watkins Glen International NASCAR uses.

The course, Watkins Glen International, is one of two road courses to hold NASCAR races on the Cup Series circuit, the other being Sonoma Raceway. The standard short road course at Watkins Glen International is a 7-turn course that is 2.45 miles (3.94 km) long; the track was modified in 1992, adding the Inner Loop, which lengthened the long course to 3.4 miles (5.5 km) and the short course to the current length of 2.45 miles (3.94 km). Kyle Busch was the defending race winner from the 2013 race.

=== Entry list ===
The entry list for the Cheez-It 355 at The Glen was released on Monday, August 4, 2014 at 12:25 p.m. Eastern time. Forty-three drivers were entered for the race.

No.	Driver	Team	Manufacturer
1	Jamie McMurray	Chip Ganassi Racing	Chevrolet
2	Brad Keselowski (PC2)	Team Penske	Ford
3	Austin Dillon (R)	Richard Childress Racing	Chevrolet
4	Kevin Harvick	Stewart–Haas Racing	Chevrolet
5	Kasey Kahne	Hendrick Motorsports	Chevrolet
7	Michael Annett (R)	Tommy Baldwin Racing	Chevrolet
9	Marcos Ambrose	Richard Petty Motorsports	Ford
10	Danica Patrick	Stewart–Haas Racing	Chevrolet
11	Denny Hamlin	Joe Gibbs Racing	Toyota
13	Casey Mears	Germain Racing	Chevrolet
14	Tony Stewart (PC3)	Stewart–Haas Racing	Chevrolet
15	Clint Bowyer	Michael Waltrip Racing	Toyota
16	Greg Biffle	Roush Fenway Racing	Ford
17	Ricky Stenhouse Jr.	Roush Fenway Racing	Ford
18	Kyle Busch	Joe Gibbs Racing	Toyota
20	Matt Kenseth (PC5)	Joe Gibbs Racing	Toyota
22	Joey Logano	Team Penske	Ford
23	Alex Bowman (R)	BK Racing	Toyota
24	Jeff Gordon (PC6)	Hendrick Motorsports	Chevrolet
26	Cole Whitt (R)	BK Racing	Toyota
27	Paul Menard	Richard Childress Racing	Chevrolet
31	Ryan Newman	Richard Childress Racing	Chevrolet
32	Boris Said	Go FAS Racing	Ford
33	Alex Kennedy	Hillman–Circle Sport	Chevrolet
34	David Ragan	Front Row Motorsports	Ford
36	Reed Sorenson	Tommy Baldwin Racing	Chevrolet
38	David Gilliland	Front Row Motorsports	Ford
40	Landon Cassill (i)	Hillman–Circle Sport	Chevrolet
41	Kurt Busch (PC4)	Stewart–Haas Racing	Chevrolet
42	Kyle Larson (R)	Chip Ganassi Racing	Chevrolet
43	Aric Almirola	Richard Petty Motorsports	Ford
47	A. J. Allmendinger	JTG Daugherty Racing	Chevrolet
48	Jimmie Johnson (PC1)	Hendrick Motorsports	Chevrolet
51	Justin Allgaier (R)	HScott Motorsports	Chevrolet
55	Brian Vickers	Michael Waltrip Racing	Toyota
66	Joe Nemechek (i)	Identity Ventures Racing	Toyota
77	Nelson Piquet Jr. (i)	Randy Humphrey Racing	Ford
78	Martin Truex Jr.	Furniture Row Racing	Chevrolet
83	Ryan Truex (R)	BK Racing	Toyota
88	Dale Earnhardt Jr.	Hendrick Motorsports	Chevrolet
95	Michael McDowell	Leavine Family Racing	Ford
98	Josh Wise	Phil Parsons Racing	Chevrolet
99	Carl Edwards	Roush Fenway Racing	Ford
Official entry list

Key	Meaning
(R)	Rookie
(i)	Ineligible for points
(PC#)	Past champions provisional

== Practice ==
=== First practice ===
Kevin Harvick was the fastest in the first practice session with a time of 68.652 and a speed of 128.474 mph (206.759 km/h). A number of drivers spun out during the first session. Danica Patrick changed engines during the session and was forced to start from the rear of the field.

Pos	No.	Driver	Team	Manufacturer	Time	Speed
1	4	Kevin Harvick	Stewart–Haas Racing	Chevrolet	68.652	128.474
2	48	Jimmie Johnson	Hendrick Motorsports	Chevrolet	68.992	127.841
3	2	Brad Keselowski	Team Penske	Ford	69.690	126.560
Official first practice results

=== Final practice ===
A. J. Allmendinger was the fastest in the final practice session with a time of 68.538 and a speed of 128.688 mph (207.103 km/h). Patrick crashed her car in turn 5 and was forced to go to a backup car. NASCAR began cracking down on drivers for blend line violations during the practice sessions. Aric Almirola, Michael Annett, Clint Bowyer, Austin Dillon and Ryan Newman were issued penalties for blend line violations. Following the session, series leader Jeff Gordon stated that "for years we have not had that", but with the introduction of a new qualifying procedure in the 2014 season, Gordon also noted that "sometimes you just forget, but to me it's about going along with those procedures during practice and your spotter reminding you when you go out and practice; where those blend lines are and what the procedure is and just getting into a rhythm of it".

Pos	No.	Driver	Team	Manufacturer	Time	Speed
1	47	A. J. Allmendinger	JTG Daugherty Racing	Chevrolet	68.538	128.688
2	9	Marcos Ambrose	Richard Petty Motorsports	Ford	68.541	128.682
3	18	Kyle Busch	Joe Gibbs Racing	Toyota	68.553	128.660
Official final practice results

== Qualifying ==
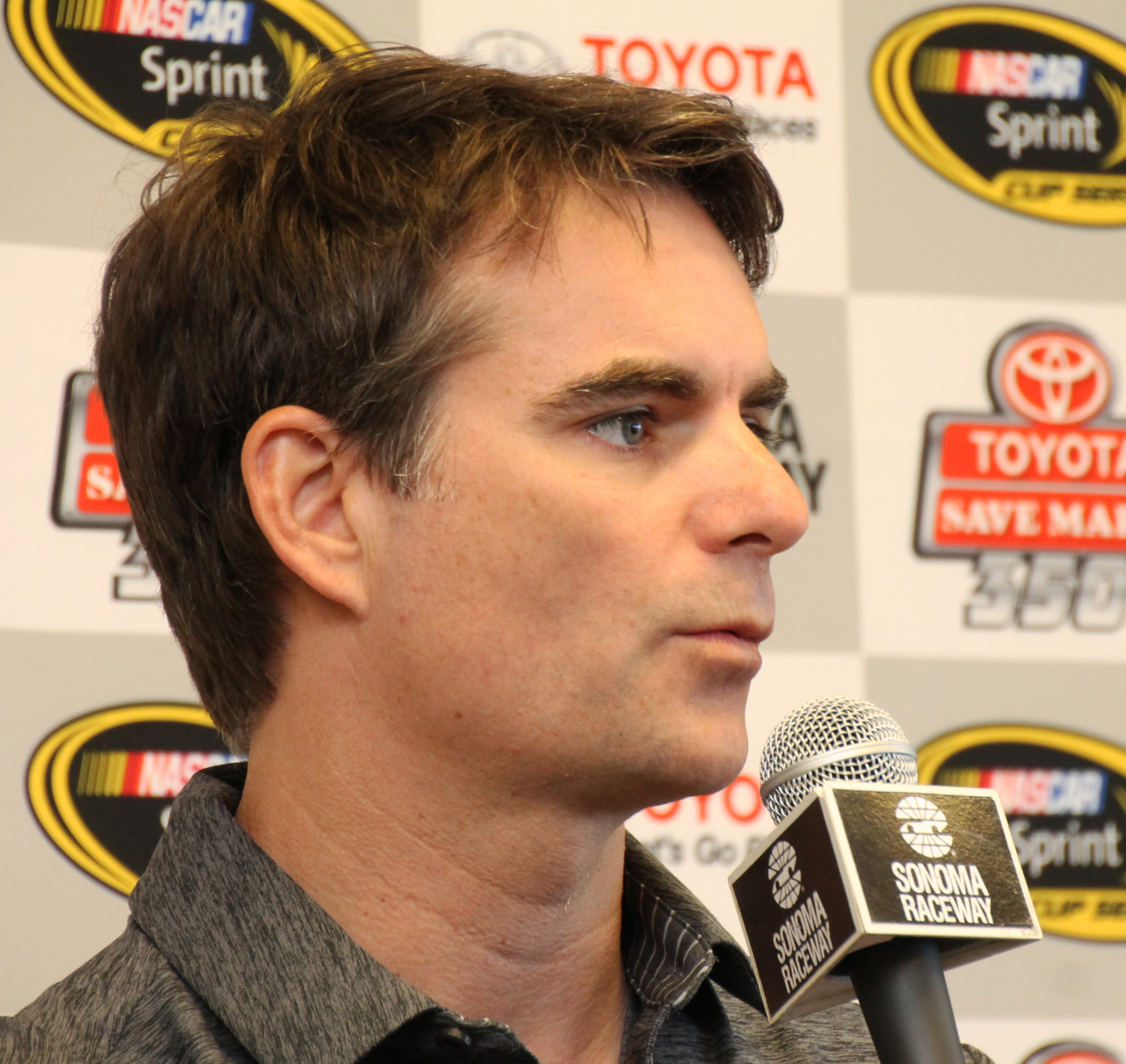
Jeff Gordon scored the 75th pole position of his career, setting a new track record.

Jeff Gordon won his 75th career pole with a new track record time of 68.126 and a speed of 129.466 mph (208.355 km/h); it was Gordon's first pole of 2014, and as a result, it was a record 22nd consecutive year that Gordon has won a pole in the Sprint Cup Series. Gordon had set Watkins Glen as a priority in his 2014 campaign, as he felt he had "run so poorly here recently" and that his team "loses confidence in their car and you get off track and lost a little bit. That's the way it's been for us the last few times we've been here, the last several times". Marcos Ambrose joined Gordon on the front row, 0.173 seconds in arrears. He joked about Gordon beating him to pole, stating that he wished "Jeff was a little kinder to me to let me get the pole", but did state that "it was a pretty good lap though and I will take it".

=== Qualifying results ===
Pos	No.	Driver	Team	Manufacturer	R1	R2
1	24	Jeff Gordon	Hendrick Motorsports	Chevrolet	68.455	68.126
2	9	Marcos Ambrose	Richard Petty Motorsports	Ford	68.113	68.299
3	48	Jimmie Johnson	Hendrick Motorsports	Chevrolet	68.669	68.389
4	4	Kevin Harvick	Stewart–Haas Racing	Chevrolet	68.356	68.447
5	41	Kurt Busch	Stewart–Haas Racing	Chevrolet	68.661	68.470
6	47	A. J. Allmendinger	JTG Daugherty Racing	Chevrolet	68.446	68.531
7	88	Dale Earnhardt Jr.	Hendrick Motorsports	Chevrolet	68.524	68.806
8	20	Matt Kenseth	Joe Gibbs Racing	Toyota	68.684	68.810
9	2	Brad Keselowski	Team Penske	Ford	68.573	68.878
10	31	Ryan Newman	Richard Childress Racing	Chevrolet	68.561	68.978
11	22	Joey Logano	Team Penske	Ford	68.741	69.035
12	55	Brian Vickers	Michael Waltrip Racing	Toyota	68.792	69.171
13	14	Tony Stewart (Note: Tony Stewart had qualified the car and was scheduled to compete as such. After an incident the night before at Canandaigua Motorsports Park, Stewart decided to not race, out of respect to Kevin Ward Jr. who died the night before. Regan Smith drove in his place, and started from the rear of the field.)	Stewart–Haas Racing	Chevrolet	68.796	—
14	1	Jamie McMurray	Chip Ganassi Racing	Chevrolet	68.836	—
15	51	Justin Allgaier (R)	HScott Motorsports	Chevrolet	68.892	—
16	99	Carl Edwards	Roush Fenway Racing	Ford	68.993	—
17	11	Denny Hamlin	Joe Gibbs Racing	Toyota	69.024	—
18	26	Cole Whitt (R)	BK Racing	Toyota	69.060	—
19	18	Kyle Busch	Joe Gibbs Racing	Toyota	69.136	—
20	27	Paul Menard	Richard Childress Racing	Chevrolet	69.137	—
21	17	Ricky Stenhouse Jr.	Roush Fenway Racing	Ford	69.143	—
22	13	Casey Mears	Germain Racing	Toyota	69.273	—
23	42	Kyle Larson (R)	Chip Ganassi Racing	Chevrolet	69.280	—
24	15	Clint Bowyer	Michael Waltrip Racing	Toyota	69.297	—
25	78	Martin Truex Jr.	Furniture Row Racing	Chevrolet	69.315	—
26	34	David Ragan	Front Row Motorsports	Ford	69.316	—
27	43	Aric Almirola	Richard Petty Motorsports	Ford	69.341	—
28	16	Greg Biffle	Roush Fenway Racing	Ford	69.344	—
29	95	Michael McDowell	Leavine Family Racing	Ford	69.352	—
30	5	Kasey Kahne	Hendrick Motorsports	Chevrolet	69.442	—
31	3	Austin Dillon (R)	Richard Childress Racing	Chevrolet	69.548	—
32	77	Nelson Piquet Jr.	Randy Humphrey Racing	Ford	69.605	—
33	38	David Gilliland	Front Row Motorsports	Ford	69.611	—
34	32	Boris Said	Go FAS Racing	Ford	69.684	—
35	83	Ryan Truex (R)	BK Racing	Toyota	69.719	—
36	23	Alex Bowman (R)	BK Racing	Toyota	70.098	—
37	98	Josh Wise	Phil Parsons Racing	Chevrolet	70.242	—
38	33	Alex Kennedy	Hillman–Circle Sport	Chevrolet	70.410	—
39	36	Reed Sorenson	Tommy Baldwin Racing	Chevrolet	70.491	—
40	66	Joe Nemechek	Identity Ventures Racing	Toyota	70.503	—
41	40	Landon Cassill	Hillman–Circle Sport	Chevrolet	70.568	—
42	7	Michael Annett (R)	Tommy Baldwin Racing	Chevrolet	70.571	—
43	10	Danica Patrick	Stewart–Haas Racing	Chevrolet	70.585	—
Official qualifying results

== Race ==
=== First half ===
==== Start ====
The night before the race, Tony Stewart was involved in an incident – which resulted in the death of fellow competitor, Kevin Ward Jr. – during a sprint car race at Canandaigua Motorsports Park, around 50 miles (80 kilometres) from Watkins Glen. Prior to the start of the race, Greg Zipadelli, vice president of competition for Stewart–Haas Racing, announced that Stewart would not race and Regan Smith would drive in his place. Zipadelli confirmed pre-race that Stewart "feels strongly this is the right thing to do" and that his Stewart–Haas Racing team supported and agreed with his decision. As a result of the driver change, Smith started from the rear of the field. The race was scheduled to start at 1:19 p.m. Eastern time, but the race started five minutes late with Jeff Gordon leading the field.

Kevin Harvick made an unscheduled stop on lap four to remove a bean bag from his car. Paul Menard also made an unscheduled stop for a fluid leak and took his car to the garage. Cole Whitt brought out the first caution of the race on lap 10 after his brakes locked up and he collided head on into the tire barrier in turn 1. The race restarted on lap 15, with Gordon still leading. The next lap, Brad Keselowski made contact with Matt Kenseth in turn 1 and the grill of his car caved in. Kyle Larson was running 23rd on lap 18 when he missed the turn into the inner loop, and was forced to come to a complete stop; as a result, Larson fell back to 38th. Two laps later, David Ragan and Boris Said blew the entrance to the inner loop and fell back in the running order. Alex Bowman spun in turn six and got back going again without bringing out the caution. Kyle Busch made his first stop on lap 24 and left his pit box with the fuel can stuck on the car; he served a stop-and-go penalty for removing equipment from the pit box.

=== Second half ===
Joey Logano served a pass-through penalty for his crew going over the wall too soon on lap 28. Kyle Busch made his third stop in four laps for a flat tire on lap 29, while Marcos Ambrose gave up second place to make his first stop of the race. Gordon made his first stop on lap 30, passing the lead to teammate Kasey Kahne. Kahne gave up the lead on lap 33 to pit and gave the lead to Ambrose. Gordon began losing power going down the back stretch and brought out the second caution of the race on lap 51. Ambrose came in to pit during the caution and Jimmie Johnson took the lead for the restart on lap 55.

==== Big wreck ====
The third caution of the race flew on lap 56 for a crash in the outer loop, a lap later, where the race was red flagged to ensue cleanup on the track. Greg Biffle drifted into the runoff area on the exit of turn 5 and came across the front of Ryan Newman. Newman's car got turned and hit the Armco barrier on the right-hand side, before turning back towards traffic. Newman's rear of the car then barely clipped McDowell in the right-rear. McDowell's rear wheel housing broke off, the car then bounced twice in the air and then punctured a hole in the Armco barrier on the left side of the track, beyond the exit of The Boot where it sent McDowell on his side for a brief second before he came back upright. Bowman and Danica Patrick also took damage in the wreck while David Ragan did an unbelievable job to avoid the wreck with no damage where he swerved a hard left to avoid Newman and then a hard right to avoid McDowell while somehow not spinning out. The red flag was shown temporarily to bring the field down the front stretch.

"Biffle jumped up on the curb and got up and across the grass. I probably could have given him a little more room but I tried to time it so I could shoot past him and he slowed down when he got back onto the racetrack. It's disappointing. We lost (safety expert) John Melvin a couple of weeks ago and he did a lot of innovations for this sport, and it's really sad that they haven't adapted any of them here at this racetrack. The barriers, the SAFER barrier doesn't exist here. There are no concrete walls. It's a very antiquated racetrack and it isn't up to NASCAR standards at all. It's a shame that we have to have an accident like that to prove it. Hopefully something will change the next time we come back."

— Ryan Newman, speaking with ESPN, upon his return to pit road.

In a post-race interview with ESPN reporter Vince Welch, Newman was highly critical of the circuit, in regards to the Armco barriers, the damage that was caused by his car and the car of McDowell, as well as its "antiquated" safety features. Upon his return to pit road, McDowell also spoke with Welch, stating that "it seems like when I do it they are usually fairly big", referring to a previous crash that he had suffered at the 2008 Samsung 500, at Texas Motor Speedway. He also stated that he "didn't really have time to adjust or move, I just tried not to hit Ryan in the door there. I was along for the ride".

The race was red flagged for 81 minutes while the Armco barriers were repaired, and as the cars started running again, Carl Edwards stayed out when the leaders came in to pit. The race restarted with 31 laps to go, and A. J. Allmendinger took the lead from Edwards with 30 laps to go. Casey Mears got turned in the inner loop with 18 laps to go, before the caution flew for the fourth time with 13 laps to go, after Josh Wise stalled in the inner loop. Allmendinger led the way on the restart with nine laps to go, but the fifth caution came out very quickly when Jimmie Johnson got turned in turn 1 and made contact with Regan Smith, while Justin Allgaier was also collected.

==== Finish ====
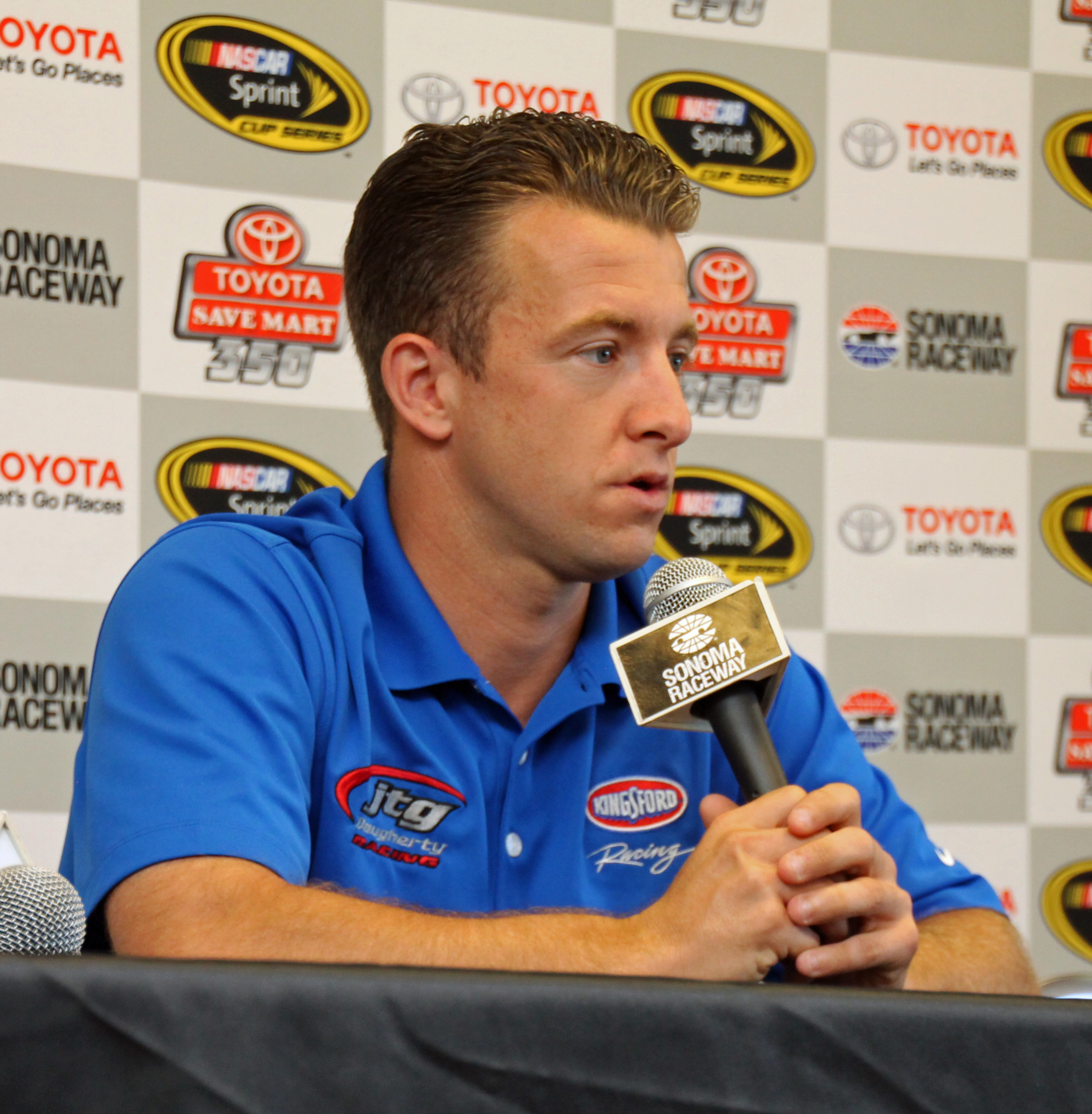
A. J. Allmendinger scored his first career Cup Series win.

The race restarted with five laps to go. Ambrose took the lead immediately thereafter, following a side-by-side battle with Allmendinger. The sixth caution period came out the following lap, when Denny Hamlin spun and crashed into the gravel-filled barrels at the entrance to pit road. In a non-connected incident, Alex Kennedy hit the wall on the exit of turn one, to bring out the sixth caution, the race was red flagged for a second time. Following a delay of around 20 minutes, the race restarted, and Allmendinger held off a hard charging Ambrose with two laps to go to score his first career Sprint Cup Series victory. Upon exiting his car, Allmendinger expressed his delight at the result, stating he could not "believe we've won a NASCAR Sprint Cup race", before congratulating his entire JTG Daugherty Racing team, expressing "with this whole 47 team, [team owners] Tad Geschickter, Jody Geschickter, Brad Daugherty, all the great sponsors we have, our first Cup victory together, my first victory...I love these guys. I just wanted it so bad for them and this team. They work so hard. I wasn't gonna let Marcos take that from me". Ambrose recorded his sixth top-three finish in Sprint Cup races at Watkins Glen, but praised the performance of his late-race rival, Allmendinger. "First of all, congratulations to A. J. and the 47 team. They deserved that win. I left nothing on the table. I tried to rattle his cage and couldn't shake him. We raced fair and square to the end there. It was a tough couple laps but it was fair. We were both giving it to each other pretty hard. No harm, no foul. We just came up a little short".

=== Post race penalties ===
On Wednesday, August 13, Kevin Harvick's team was penalized for a rules infraction due to the bean bag that forced Harvick to make an unscheduled stop on lap 4, in order for the object to be removed. The infraction was levied as a P3 level penalty, outlined in Section 12-4.3 of the 2014 rule book:

• A. Violation examples could include but are not limited to:

• 1(c): Unapproved added weight and/or weight affixed improperly (e.g. Unapproved added weight (size and material)); unapproved added weight location, but not of a nature rising to a higher numbered penalty.

The infraction violates the following sections in the rule book:

• 12-1: Actions detrimental to stock car racing; • 20-2.3: Added car weight

• A. Any weight added to the car must be bolted inside the body shell in an approved weight container and in a position acceptable to NASCAR officials

• Added weight must be in block form of not less than five pound blocks (no pellets) and painted white with the car number or team identification permanently legible on it.

As a result, crew chief Rodney Childers was fined $25,000.

=== Race summary ===
- Lead changes: 7
- Cautions: 6 for 17 laps
- Red flags: 2 for 1 hour, 42 minutes and 41 seconds
- Time of race: 2 hours, 26 minutes and 48 seconds
- Average speed: 90.123 miles per hour (145.039 km/h)

=== Race results ===
Pos	No.	Driver	Team	Manufacturer	Laps	Points
1	47	A. J. Allmendinger	JTG Daugherty Racing	Chevrolet	90	48
2	9	Marcos Ambrose	Richard Petty Motorsports	Ford	90	43
3	41	Kurt Busch	Stewart–Haas Racing	Chevrolet	90	41
4	42	Kyle Larson (R)	Chip Ganassi Racing	Chevrolet	90	40
5	99	Carl Edwards	Roush Fenway Racing	Ford	90	40
6	22	Joey Logano	Team Penske	Ford	90	38
7	4	Kevin Harvick	Stewart–Haas Racing	Chevrolet	90	37
8	16	Greg Biffle	Roush Fenway Racing	Ford	90	36
9	20	Matt Kenseth	Joe Gibbs Racing	Toyota	90	35
10	55	Brian Vickers	Michael Waltrip Racing	Toyota	90	34
11	88	Dale Earnhardt Jr.	Hendrick Motorsports	Chevrolet	90	33
12	5	Kasey Kahne	Hendrick Motorsports	Chevrolet	90	33
13	78	Martin Truex Jr.	Furniture Row Racing	Chevrolet	90	31
14	1	Jamie McMurray	Chip Ganassi Racing	Chevrolet	90	30
15	13	Casey Mears	Germain Racing	Chevrolet	90	29
16	3	Austin Dillon (R)	Richard Childress Racing	Chevrolet	90	28
17	51	Justin Allgaier (R)	HScott Motorsports	Chevrolet	90	27
18	43	Aric Almirola	Richard Petty Motorsports	Ford	90	26
19	34	David Ragan	Front Row Motorsports	Ford	90	25
20	17	Ricky Stenhouse Jr.	Roush Fenway Racing	Ford	90	24
21	10	Danica Patrick	Stewart–Haas Racing	Chevrolet	90	23
22	38	David Gilliland	Front Row Motorsports	Ford	90	22
23	36	Reed Sorenson	Tommy Baldwin Racing	Chevrolet	90	21
24	11	Denny Hamlin	Joe Gibbs Racing	Toyota	90	20
25	32	Boris Said	Go FAS Racing	Ford	90	19
26	77	Nelson Piquet Jr.	Randy Humphrey Racing	Ford	90	18
27	15	Clint Bowyer	Michael Waltrip Racing	Toyota	90	17
28	48	Jimmie Johnson	Hendrick Motorsports	Chevrolet	90	17
29	40	Landon Cassill	Hillman–Circle Sport	Chevrolet	89	0
30	66	Joe Nemechek	Identity Ventures Racing	Toyota	89	0
31	7	Michael Annett (R)	Tommy Baldwin Racing	Chevrolet	88	13
32	27	Paul Menard	Richard Childress Racing	Chevrolet	87	12
33	33	Alex Kennedy	Hillman–Circle Sport	Chevrolet	86	11
34	24	Jeff Gordon	Hendrick Motorsports	Chevrolet	86	12
35	2	Brad Keselowski	Team Penske	Ford	85	9
36	23	Alex Bowman (R)	BK Racing	Toyota	85	8
37	14	Regan Smith	Stewart–Haas Racing	Chevrolet	81	0
38	98	Josh Wise	Phil Parsons Racing	Chevrolet	78	6
39	83	Ryan Truex (R)	BK Racing	Toyota	69	5
40	18	Kyle Busch	Joe Gibbs Racing	Toyota	69	4
41	31	Ryan Newman	Richard Childress Racing	Chevrolet	55	3
42	95	Michael McDowell	Leavine Family Racing	Ford	55	2
43	26	Cole Whitt (R)	BK Racing	Toyota	9	1

== Media ==
=== Television ===
ESPN
Booth announcers	Pit reporters
Lap-by-lap: Allen Bestwick; Color-commentator: Dale Jarrett; Color commentator: Andy Petree	Jerry Punch; Dave Burns; Vince Welch; Jamie Little

=== Radio ===
MRN Radio
Booth announcers	Turn announcers	Pit reporters
Lead announcer: Joe Moore; Announcer: Jeff Striegle	Turns 2, 3 & 4: Dave Moody; Back Straight, Inner Loop & Outer Loop: Mike Bagley; Turns 10 & 11: Buddy Long	Winston Kelly; Steve Post; Alex Hayden; Woody Cain

== Standings after the race ==
Drivers' Championship standings

	Pos	Driver	Points
1	1	Dale Earnhardt Jr.	773
1	2	Jeff Gordon	769 (−4)
1	3	Matt Kenseth	703 (−70)
1	4	Brad Keselowski	696 (−77)
2	5	Joey Logano	671 (−102)
2	6	Carl Edwards	658 (−115)
1	7	Jimmie Johnson	650 (−123)
3	8	Kevin Harvick	645 (−128)
4	9	Ryan Newman	645 (−128)
2	10	Kyle Larson (R)	635 (−138)
2	11	Clint Bowyer	634 (−139)
1	12	Greg Biffle	626 (−147)
1	13	Kasey Kahne	622 (−151)
1	14	Austin Dillon (R)	616 (−157)
5	15	Kyle Busch	615 (−158)
1	16	Marcos Ambrose	584 (−189)

Manufacturers' Championship standings

Pos	Manufacturer	Points
1	Chevrolet	990
2	Ford	959 (−31)
3	Toyota	883 (−107)

- Note: Only the first sixteen positions are included for the driver standings.

== Notes ==
Previous race: 2014 Gobowling.com 400	Sprint Cup Series; 2014 season	Next race: 2014 Pure Michigan 400
