= BurgerFi =

American fast casual restaurant chain

BurgerFi International, Inc.

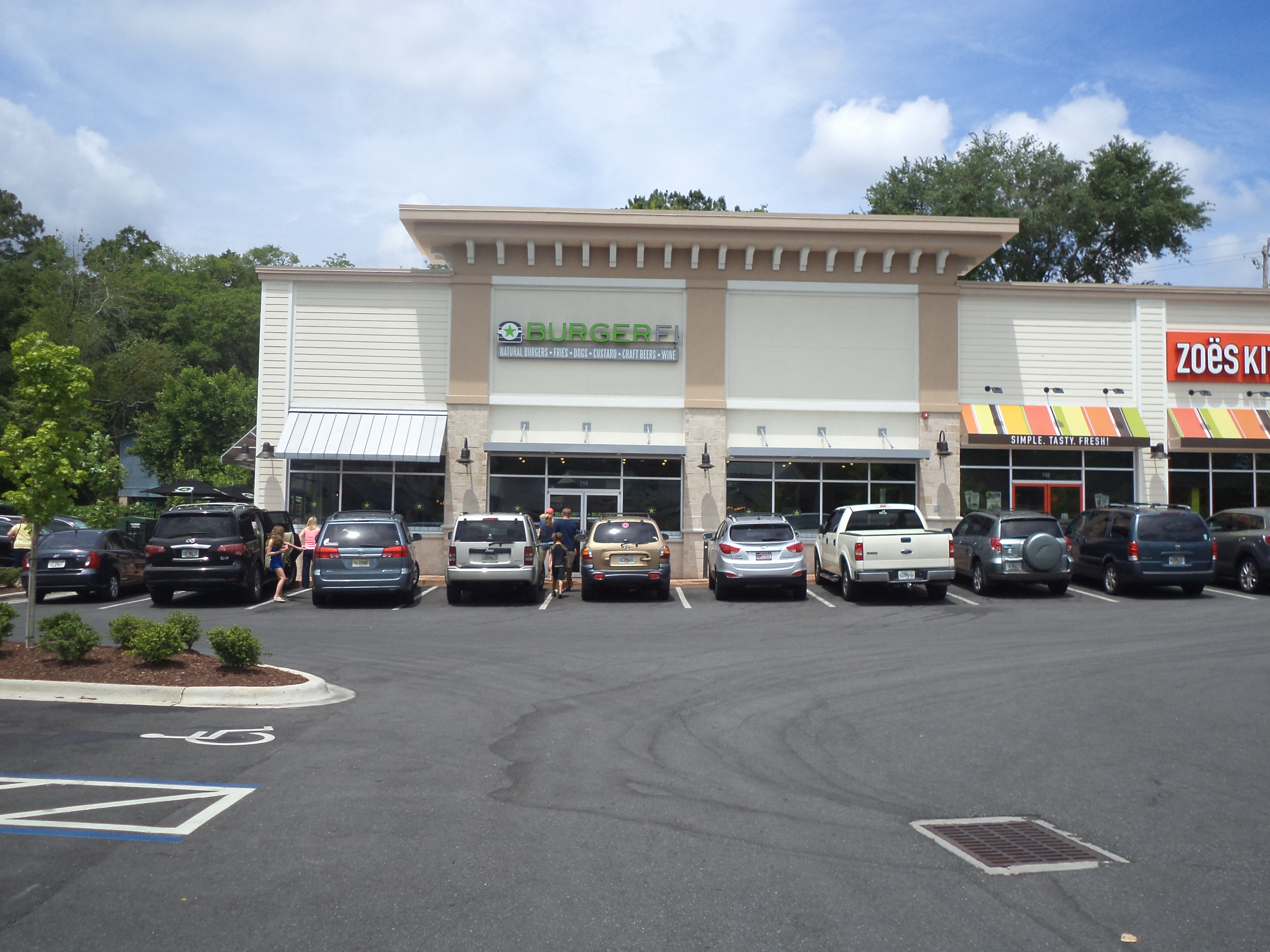
- BurgerFi in Tallahassee, Florida.
- Trade name: BurgerFi
- Company type: Public
- Traded as: Nasdaq: BFI
- Industry: Restaurants
- Genre: Fast casual restaurant
- Founded: February 2011; 15 years ago, in Lauderdale-by-the-Sea, Florida, United States
- Founder: John Rosatti
- Headquarters: Fort Lauderdale, Florida, United States
- Number of locations: 65 (2026)
- Areas served: United States
- Key people: Ian Baines (CEO)
- Products: Burgers; Veggie Burgers; Fries; Onion Rings; Hotdogs; Custard; Beer; Wine
- Revenue: ▲US$34.7 million (2020)
- Number of employees: 700 (2020)
- Subsidiaries: Anthony's Coal Fired Pizza
- Website: BurgerFi.com

BurgerFi International, Inc. (doing business as BurgerFi) is an American hamburger restaurant chain aimed at the "better burger" sector of the market. The first location was opened in February 2011 in Lauderdale-by-the-Sea, Florida.

== History ==
In 2015 a review in USA Today spoke of "... its upscaled statement with sleek modern restaurants giving just a hint of bar or coffeehouse atmosphere".

In 2017, the chain partnered with Beyond Meat and subsequently introduced a vegetarian/vegan burger patty called the "Beyond Burger".

In September 2024, BurgerFi filed for Chapter 11 bankruptcy protection.

The Chapter 11 proceedings of BurgerFi International, Inc. and 114 affiliated debtors (Case No. 24-12017) were filed in the United States Bankruptcy Court for the District of Delaware before Judge Craig T. Goldblatt. Raines Feldman Littrell LLP served as lead debtor's counsel, with Force Ten Partners appointed as chief restructuring officer. The Official Committee of Unsecured Creditors retained Morris Nichols Arsht & Tunnell LLP and McDonald Hopkins LLC as co-counsel. The proceedings involved claims from landlords, trade vendors, and franchise operators, with Ballard Spahr LLP, the Law Office of Susan E. Kaufman LLC, Mark S. Roher, P.A. of South Florida, and CM Law PLLC representing various creditor and purchaser interests throughout the case. The plan was confirmed on March 12, 2025, with substantially all assets acquired by TREW Capital Group.

=== Food sourcing ===
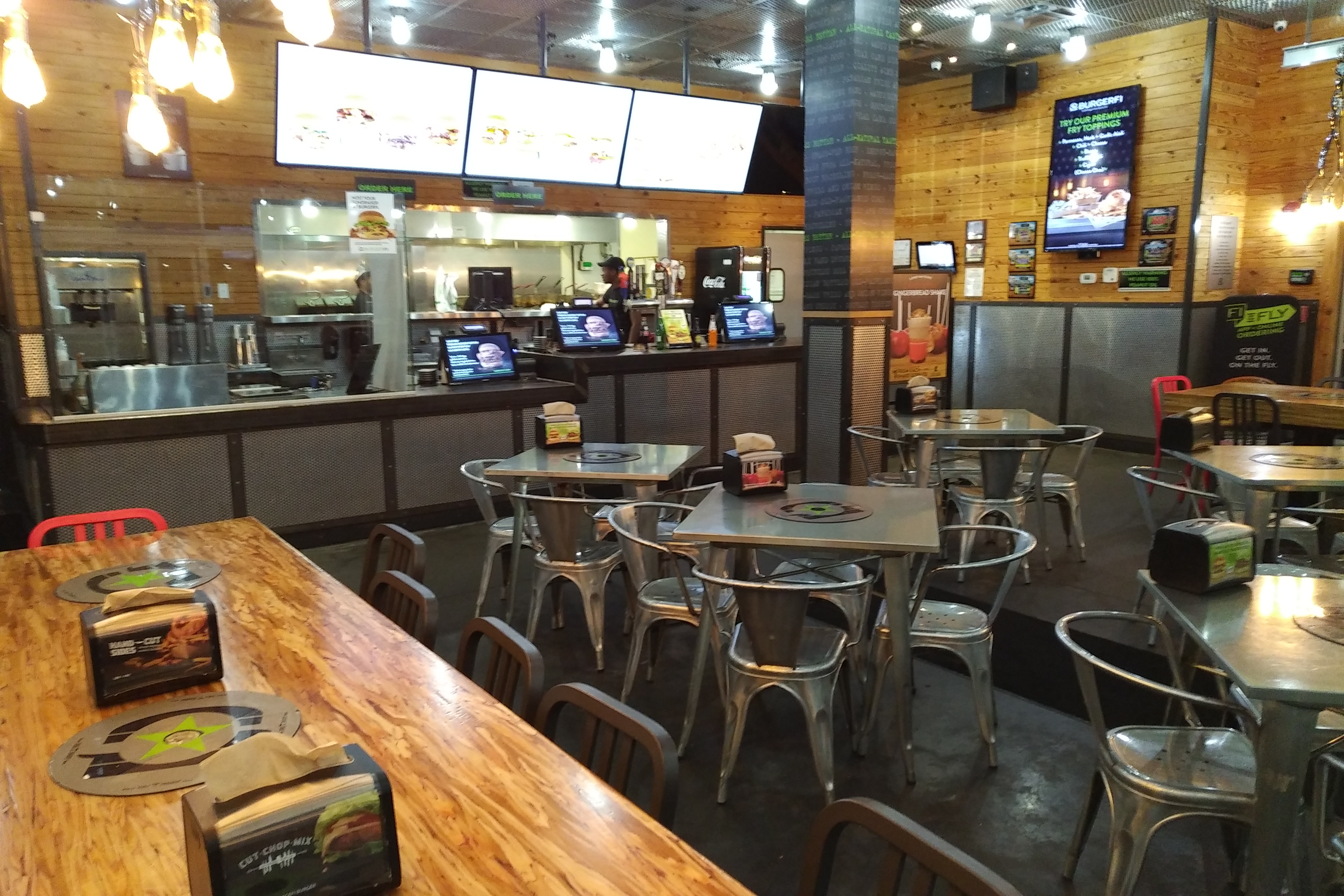
BurgerFi restaurant in Gainesville, Florida, in 2018

In 2018, the Consumers Union graded the top 25 burger chains in the U.S. on their antibiotic use policies for beef. BurgerFi was one of the two chains that were given an "A" rating for using beef that was raised without routine use of antibiotics. (Note: The other being Shake Shack.)

=== Acquisition of Anthony's Coal Fired Pizza ===
In November 2021, BurgerFi completed the acquisition of Florida-based pizza chain Anthony's Coal Fired Pizza, which has 61 locations in 8 US states as of June 2021.

== See also ==
- List of hamburger restaurants
