= Armani Williams =

American racing driver (born 2000)

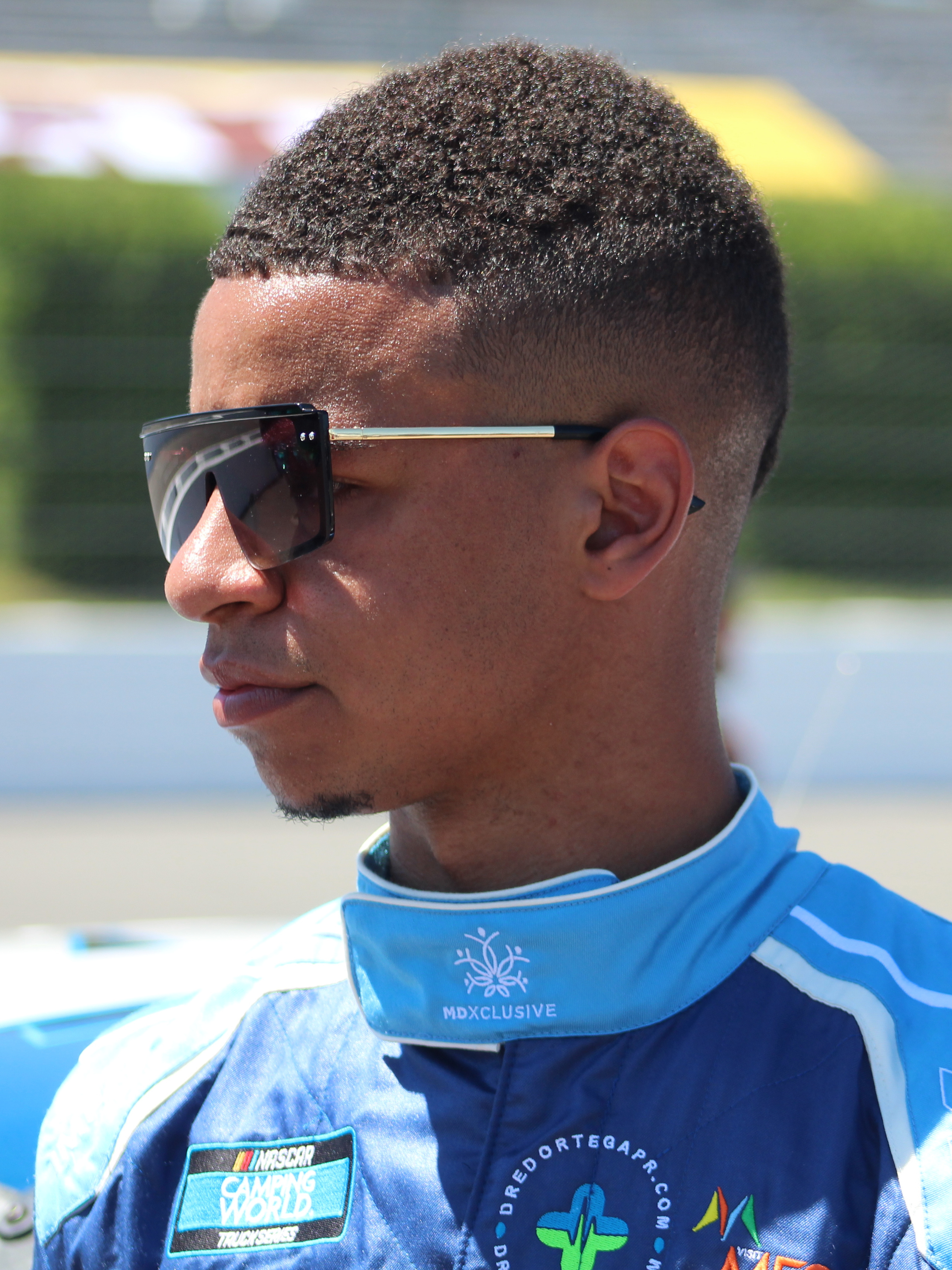
- Williams at Pocono Raceway in 2022
- Born: April 14, 2000 (age 26); Grosse Pointe, Michigan, U.S.

NASCAR O'Reilly Auto Parts Series career
- 2 races run over 1 year
- First race: 2024 SciAps 200 (New Hampshire)
- Last race: 2024 Credit One NASCAR Amex Credit Card 300 (Homestead)
Wins	Top tens	Poles
0	0	0

NASCAR FedEx Freight Truck Series career
- 7 races run over 3 years
- 2023 position: 66th
- Best finish: 65th (2022)
- First race: 2021 Toyota 200 (Gateway)
- Last race: 2023 Baptist Health Cancer Care 200 (Homestead)
Wins	Top tens	Poles
0	0	0

NASCAR Canada Series career
- 6 races run over 2 years
- First race: 2017 Fast Eddie/CHOKO 250 (Delaware)
- Last race: 2018 Visit New Hampshire 100 (Loudon)
Wins	Top tens	Poles
0	1	0

ARCA Menards Series career
- 3 races run over 2 years
- First race: 2020 General Tire 150 (Phoenix)
- Last race: 2024 Hard Rock Bet 200 (Daytona)
Wins	Top tens	Poles
0	1	0
- Statistics up to date as of August 16, 2025.

Armani Williams (born April 14, 2000) is an American professional stock car racing driver who last competed part-time in the NASCAR Xfinity Series, driving the No. 6 Ford Mustang for MBM Motorsports, and part-time in the ARCA Menards Series, driving the No. 13 Toyota Camry for MBM Motorsports. He has also competed in the NASCAR Craftsman Truck Series as well as what are now the ARCA Menards Series East and ARCA Menards Series West in the past.

Williams is the first NASCAR driver openly diagnosed on the autism spectrum. He is one of two currently active autistic NASCAR drivers, along with Cody Ware. Over the course of his NASCAR career, Williams' cars have often sported blue paint schemes with the blue autism puzzle pieces to symbolize his diagnosis on the spectrum and to raise awareness. He is also one of five African-American drivers currently competing in NASCAR, along with Cup Series driver Bubba Wallace, Rajah Caruth, Blake Lothian, and Lavar Scott.

== Racing career ==
Williams great-grandfather owned an auto-body repair shop creating the foundation for automobiles in the family. Williams in particular loved to play with Hot Wheels toy cars as a child, and later discovered NASCAR on TV and immediately began watching races. He soon decided it was what he wanted to do as a career, so he began racing go-karts at the age of eight, and eventually bandoleros after that. Specifically, he attended a competitive go-karting school and then participated in go-kart races.

Williams originally competed in the ARCA Truck Series, finishing seventh in the standings in the 2016 season. However, the series was shut down after 2016, so he moved to the NASCAR Pinty's Series in Canada in 2017. Driving for his mentor, D. J. Kennington, Williams drove his No. 28 Dodge in five races (plus withdrawing from a sixth), with a best finish of eleventh in his debut race at Delaware Speedway. He made one start in 2018 for Peter Simone's No. 97 Dodge at New Hampshire, where he earned his first top-ten finish in the series with a ninth-place.

Williams raced once in both the NASCAR K&N Pro Series East and West in 2018 for Calabrese Motorsports and Patriot Motorsports Group, respectively. He returned to the Patriot team, renamed Kart Idaho Racing, in 2019 (after a change in ownership), after not qualifying for the race at Irwindale driving the No. 35 for Vizion Motorsports. After Williams' DNQ, John Wood stepped out of his No. 38 for Williams to drive it, where he finished twelfth. In the East Series, Williams competed with Kart Idaho at New Hampshire, finishing eleventh in that race.

Williams in 2020 would make his debut in the ARCA Menards Series at Phoenix, where he drove Fast Track Racing's No. 01 car to a seventeenth place finish. He would then run team's No. 12 car at Michigan, where he scored a top-ten finish.

In 2021, Williams made his NASCAR Camping World Truck Series debut at Gateway in the No. 33 Reaume Brothers Racing Toyota, finishing 21st.

In 2022, Williams ran two more races in the Truck Series (originally three until Josh Reaume's Darlington throwback was released).

== Personal life ==
Diagnosed at age two, Williams is on the autism spectrum and spoke his first word at three years old. He did have some social interaction and sensory issues growing up, as other people on the spectrum do, but quickly learned to improve and overcome them with the help of his parents.

Williams and his father attended the 2010 Brickyard 400 when he was ten which sparked his interest in racing along with playing with toy cars at home and watching NASCAR races on TV. He attends Oakland University studying mechanical engineering. His favorite driver growing up was Jimmie Johnson.

Williams is from Grosse Pointe, Michigan and had a 3.0 GPA at his high school while balancing school and racing.

== Motorsports career results ==
=== NASCAR ===
(key) (Bold – Pole position awarded by qualifying time. Italics – Pole position earned by points standings or practice time. * – Most laps led.)

==== Xfinity Series ====
NASCAR Xfinity Series results
Year	Team	No.	Make	1	2	3	4	5	6	7	8	9	10	11	12	13	14	15	16	17	18	19	20	21	22	23	24	25	26	27	28	29	30	31	32	33	NXSC	Pts	Ref
2024	MBM Motorsports	6	Ford	DAY	ATL	LVS	PHO	COA	RCH	MAR	TEX	TAL	DOV	DAR	CLT	PIR	SON	IOW	NHA; 33	NSH	CSC	POC	IND	MCH	DAY	DAR	ATL	GLN	BRI	KAN	TAL	ROV	LVS				72nd	6	
2024	Joey Gase Motorsports	35	Ford																															HOM; 35	MAR	PHO	72nd	6	

==== Craftsman Truck Series ====
NASCAR Craftsman Truck Series results
Year	Team	No.	Make	1	2	3	4	5	6	7	8	9	10	11	12	13	14	15	16	17	18	19	20	21	22	23	NCTC	Pts	Ref
2021	Reaume Brothers Racing	33	Toyota	DAY	DAY	LVS	ATL	BRI	RCH	KAN	DAR	COA	CLT	TEX	NSH	POC	KNX	GLN	GTW; 21	DAR	BRI	LVS	TAL	MAR	PHO		72nd	16	
2022	Reaume Brothers Racing	43	Toyota	DAY	LVS	ATL	COA	MAR	BRI	DAR	KAN	TEX; DNQ	CLT	GTW	SON	KNO	NSH	MOH	POC; 31	IRP	RCH						65th	10	
2022	Reaume Brothers Racing	43	Chevy																			KAN; 35	BRI	TAL	HOM		65th	10	
2022	Young's Motorsports	20	Chevy																							PHO; 35	65th	10	
2023	G2G Racing	46	Toyota	DAY	LVS	ATL	COA	TEX; 29	BRI	MAR	KAN	DAR	NWS	CLT; 35	GTW	NSH	MOH	POC	RCH	IRP; DNQ	MLW	KAN	BRI	TAL	HOM; 31	PHO	66th	16	

^{*} Season still in progress
^{1} Ineligible for series points

==== K&N Pro Series East ====
NASCAR K&N Pro Series East results
Year	Team	No.	Make	1	2	3	4	5	6	7	8	9	10	11	12	13	14	NKNPSEC	Pts	Ref
2018	Calabrese Motorsports	43	Ford	NSM	BRI	LGY	SBO	SBO	MEM; 16	NJM	THO	NHA	IOW	GLN	GTW	NHA	DOV	53rd	28	
2019	Kart Idaho Racing	38	Ford	NSM	BRI	SBO	SBO	MEM	NHA	IOW	GLN	BRI	GTW	NHA; 11	DOV			38th	33	

==== K&N Pro Series West ====
NASCAR K&N Pro Series West results
Year	Team	No.	Make	1	2	3	4	5	6	7	8	9	10	11	12	13	14	NKNPSWC	Pts	Ref
2018	Patriot Motorsports Group	34	Ford	KCR	TUS	TUS	OSS	CNS	SON	DCS	IOW	EVG; 15	GTW	LVS	MER	AAS	KCR	49th	29	
2019	Vizion Motorsports	35	Chevy	LVS	IRW; DNQ													51st	32	
2019	Kart Idaho Racing	38	Chevy		IRW; 12	TUS	TUS	CNS	SON	DCS	IOW	EVG	GTW	MER	AAS	KCR	PHO	51st	32	

==== Pinty's Series ====
NASCAR Pinty's Series results
Year	Team owner	No.	Make	1	2	3	4	5	6	7	8	9	10	11	12	13	Rank	Points	Ref
2017	DJK Racing	28	Dodge	MOS	DEL; 11	CHA	ICA	TOR	WYA; 14	WYA; 13	EDM	TRO	RIV; 12	MOS	STE	JUK; 13	17th	157	
2018	Peter Simone	97	Dodge	MSP	JUK	ACD	TOR	SAS	SAS	EIR	CTR	RIS	MSP	ASE	NHA; 9	JUK	42nd	35	

=== ARCA Menards Series ===
(key) (Bold – Pole position awarded by qualifying time. Italics – Pole position earned by points standings or practice time. * – Most laps led.)

ARCA Menards Series results
Year	Team	No.	Make	1	2	3	4	5	6	7	8	9	10	11	12	13	14	15	16	17	18	19	20	AMSC	Pts	Ref
2020	Fast Track Racing	01	Ford	DAY	PHO; 17	TAL	POC	IRP	KEN	IOW	KAN	TOL	TOL											45th	61	
2020	Fast Track Racing	12	Chevy											MCH; 10	DAY	GTW	L44	TOL	BRI	WIN	MEM	ISF	KAN	45th	61	
2024	MBM Motorsports	13	Toyota	DAY; 13	PHO	TAL	DOV	KAN	CLT	IOW	MOH	BLN	IRP	SLM	ELK	MCH	ISF	MLW	DSF	GLN	BRI	KAN	TOL	88th	31	

^{*} Season still in progress
