= 2018 O'Reilly Auto Parts 300 =

31st race of the 2018 NASCAR Xfinity Series

Race details
- Race 31 of 33 in the 2018 NASCAR Xfinity Series
- Date: November 3, 2018
- Official name: 14th Annual O'Reilly Auto Parts Challenge
- Location: Fort Worth, Texas, Texas Motor Speedway
- Course: Permanent racing facility
- Course length: 1.5 miles (2.41 km)
- Distance: 200 laps, 300 mi (482.803 km)
- Scheduled distance: 200 laps, 300 mi (482.803 km)
- Average speed: 116.82 miles per hour (188.00 km/h)

Pole position
Driver	Christopher Bell	Joe Gibbs Racing
- Time: 28.523

Most laps led
Driver	Tyler Reddick	JR Motorsports
- Laps: 54

Winner
No. 00	Cole Custer	Stewart-Haas Racing with Biagi-DenBeste

Television in the United States
- Network: NBCSN
- Announcers: Rick Allen, Jeff Burton, Steve Letarte, Dale Earnhardt Jr.

Radio in the United States
- Radio: Performance Racing Network

The 2018 O'Reilly Auto Parts Challenge was the 31st stock car race of the 2018 NASCAR Xfinity Series season, the second race in the Round of 12, and the 18th iteration of the event. The race was held on Saturday, November 3, 2018, in Fort Worth, Texas at Texas Motor Speedway, a 1.5 miles (2.4 km) permanent tri-oval shaped racetrack. The race took the scheduled 200 laps to complete. A wild finish would see Cole Custer of Stewart-Haas Racing with Biagi-DenBeste best JR Motorsports driver Tyler Reddick with a last-lap pass on the backstretch to win his second career NASCAR Xfinity Series race, his first and only win of the season, and a guaranteed spot in the Championship 4. To fill out the podium, Austin Cindric of Team Penske would finish third.

== Background ==
The layout of Texas Motor Speedway, the venue where the race as held.

Texas Motor Speedway is a speedway located in the northernmost portion of the U.S. city of Fort Worth, Texas – the portion located in Denton County, Texas. The track measures 1.5 miles (2.4 km) around and is banked 24 degrees in the turns, and is of the oval design, where the front straightaway juts outward slightly. The track layout is similar to Atlanta Motor Speedway and Charlotte Motor Speedway (formerly Lowe's Motor Speedway). The track is owned by Speedway Motorsports, Inc., the same company that owns Atlanta and Charlotte Motor Speedway, as well as the short-track Bristol Motor Speedway.

=== Entry list ===
#	Driver	Team	Make	Sponsor
0	Garrett Smithley	JD Motorsports	Chevrolet	Trophy Tractor, Equipment World
00	Cole Custer	Stewart-Haas Racing with Biagi-DenBeste	Ford	Autodesk
1	Elliott Sadler	JR Motorsports	Chevrolet	OneMain Financial "Lending Done Human"
01	B. J. McLeod	JD Motorsports	Chevrolet	JD Motorsports
2	Matt Tifft	Richard Childress Racing	Chevrolet	Anderson's Maple Syrup, Albertsons
3	Shane Lee	Richard Childress Racing	Chevrolet	Childress Vineyards
4	Ross Chastain	JD Motorsports	Chevrolet	Flex Seal
5	Michael Annett	JR Motorsports	Chevrolet	Pilot Flying J
7	Justin Allgaier	JR Motorsports	Chevrolet	Suave Men
8	Ray Black Jr.	B. J. McLeod Motorsports	Chevrolet	Isokern Fireplaces & Chimmeys
9	Tyler Reddick	JR Motorsports	Chevrolet	BurgerFi
11	Ryan Truex	Kaulig Racing	Chevrolet	LeafFilter Gutter Protection
13	Timmy Hill	MBM Motorsports	Toyota	MBM Motorsports
15	Quin Houff	JD Motorsports	Chevrolet	JD Motorsports
16	Ryan Reed	Roush Fenway Racing	Ford	DriveDownA1C.com
18	Ryan Preece	Joe Gibbs Racing	Toyota	Johns Manville
19	Brandon Jones	Joe Gibbs Racing	Toyota	Interstate Batteries
20	Christopher Bell	Joe Gibbs Racing	Toyota	GameStop, NBA 2K19
21	Daniel Hemric	Richard Childress Racing	Chevrolet	South Point Hotel, Casino & Spa
22	Austin Cindric	Team Penske	Ford	Discount Tire
23	Spencer Gallagher	GMS Racing	Chevrolet	Allegiant Air
35	Joey Gase	Go Green Racing with SS-Green Light Racing	Chevrolet	Donate Life Texas, Louisiana Organ Procurement Agency
36	Alex Labbé	DGM Racing	Chevrolet	Alpha Prime Regimen
38	J. J. Yeley	RSS Racing	Chevrolet	RagingWire Data Centers
39	Ryan Sieg	RSS Racing	Chevrolet	East Texas Baptist University
40	Chad Finchum	MBM Motorsports	Toyota	Smithbilt Homes
42	John Hunter Nemechek	Chip Ganassi Racing	Chevrolet	Romco Equipment Co.
45	Josh Bilicki*	JP Motorsports	Toyota	Prevagen
51	Jeremy Clements	Jeremy Clements Racing	Chevrolet	RepairableVehicles.com
52	David Starr	Jimmy Means Racing	Chevrolet	Whataburger
55	Bayley Currey*	JP Motorsports	Toyota	Touched by Pros, Rollin Smoke Barbecue
60	Ty Majeski	Roush Fenway Racing	Ford	Ford
66	Bobby Dale Earnhardt	MBM Motorsports	Toyota	HABCO Material Handling Specialists, Copeland Insurance Agency
74	Mike Harmon	Mike Harmon Racing	Dodge	Shadow Warriors Project, The Journey Home Project
76	Spencer Boyd	SS-Green Light Racing	Chevrolet	Grunt Style "This We'll Defend"
78	Vinnie Miller	B. J. McLeod Motorsports	Chevrolet	CorvetteParts.net
89	Morgan Shepherd	Shepherd Racing Ventures	Chevrolet	Visone RV Motorhome Parts, Racing with Jesus
90	Brandon Brown	Brandonbilt Motorsports	Chevrolet	Coalition to Salute America's Heroes
93	Jeff Green	RSS Racing	Chevrolet	RSS Racing
99	Stephen Leicht	B. J. McLeod Motorsports	Chevrolet	B. J. McLeod Motorsports
Official entry list

*Bilicki would wreck during pre-race activities, and as JP Motorsports had no backup cars, they would withdraw the #55 entry, and move Currey to the #45 entry.

== Practice ==
=== First practice ===
The first practice session was held on Friday, November 2, at 2:05 PM CST, and would last for 45 minutes. Ryan Truex of Kaulig Racing would set the fastest time in the session, with a lap of 28.852 and an average speed of 187.162 miles per hour (301.208 km/h).

Pos.	#	Driver	Team	Make	Time	Speed
1	11	Ryan Truex	Kaulig Racing	Chevrolet	28.852	187.162
2	21	Daniel Hemric	Richard Childress Racing	Chevrolet	28.903	186.832
3	1	Elliott Sadler	JR Motorsports	Chevrolet	28.942	186.580
Full first practice results

=== Second and final practice ===
The second and final practice session, sometimes referred to as Happy Hour, was held on Friday, November 2, at 4:35 PM CST, and would last for 50 minutes. Ryan Truex of Kaulig Racing would set the fastest time in the session, with a lap of 28.757 and an average speed of 187.780 miles per hour (302.203 km/h).

Pos.	#	Driver	Team	Make	Time	Speed
1	11	Ryan Truex	Kaulig Racing	Chevrolet	28.757	187.780
2	19	Brandon Jones	Joe Gibbs Racing	Toyota	28.771	187.689
3	3	Shane Lee	Richard Childress Racing	Chevrolet	28.773	187.676
Full Happy Hour practice results

== Qualifying ==
Qualifying was held on Saturday, November 3, at 12:40 PM CST. Since Texas Motor Speedway is under 2 miles (3.2 km), the qualifying system was a multi-car system that included three rounds. The first round was 15 minutes, where every driver would be able to set a lap within the 15 minutes. Then, the second round would consist of the fastest 24 cars in Round 1, and drivers would have 10 minutes to set a lap. Round 3 consisted of the fastest 12 drivers from Round 2, and the drivers would have 5 minutes to set a time. Whoever was fastest in Round 3 would win the pole.

Christopher Bell of Joe Gibbs Racing would win the pole after advancing from both preliminary rounds and setting the fastest lap in Round 3, with a time of 28.523 and an average speed of 189.321 miles per hour (304.683 km/h).

No drivers would fail to qualify.

=== Full qualifying results ===
Pos.	#	Driver	Team	Make	Time (R1)	Speed (R1)	Time (R2)	Speed (R2)	Time (R3)	Speed (R3)
1	20	Christopher Bell	Joe Gibbs Racing	Toyota	28.824	187.344	28.527	189.294	28.523	189.321
2	3	Shane Lee	Richard Childress Racing	Chevrolet	28.786	187.591	28.660	188.416	28.563	189.056
3	00	Cole Custer	Stewart-Haas Racing with Biagi-DenBeste	Ford	29.061	185.816	28.653	188.462	28.608	188.758
4	9	Tyler Reddick	JR Motorsports	Chevrolet	29.011	186.136	28.707	188.107	28.649	188.488
5	7	Justin Allgaier	JR Motorsports	Chevrolet	29.219	184.811	28.657	188.436	28.670	188.350
6	18	Ryan Preece	Joe Gibbs Racing	Toyota	28.696	188.180	28.584	188.917	28.686	188.245
7	2	Matt Tifft	Richard Childress Racing	Chevrolet	28.953	186.509	28.821	187.363	28.722	188.009
8	22	Austin Cindric	Team Penske	Ford	28.941	186.587	28.657	188.436	28.741	187.885
9	21	Daniel Hemric	Richard Childress Racing	Chevrolet	28.688	188.232	28.552	189.129	28.752	187.813
10	42	John Hunter Nemechek	Chip Ganassi Racing	Chevrolet	28.950	186.528	28.689	188.225	28.882	186.968
11	11	Ryan Truex	Kaulig Racing	Chevrolet	28.990	186.271	28.765	187.728	28.883	186.961
12	23	Spencer Gallagher	GMS Racing	Chevrolet	29.251	184.609	28.821	187.363	28.936	186.619
Eliminated in Round 1
13	1	Elliott Sadler	JR Motorsports	Chevrolet	28.889	186.922	28.873	187.026	—	—
14	19	Brandon Jones	Joe Gibbs Racing	Toyota	29.141	185.306	28.921	186.716	—	—
15	16	Ryan Reed	Roush Fenway Racing	Ford	29.178	185.071	28.930	186.657	—	—
16	5	Michael Annett	JR Motorsports	Chevrolet	29.260	184.552	28.942	186.580	—	—
17	39	Ryan Sieg	RSS Racing	Chevrolet	29.416	183.574	29.422	183.536	—	—
18	51	Jeremy Clements	Jeremy Clements Racing	Chevrolet	29.400	183.673	29.497	183.069	—	—
19	40	Chad Finchum	MBM Motorsports	Toyota	29.676	181.965	29.543	182.784	—	—
20	36	Alex Labbé	DGM Racing	Chevrolet	29.695	181.849	29.603	182.414	—	—
21	90	Brandon Brown	Brandonbilt Motorsports	Chevrolet	29.719	181.702	29.852	180.892	—	—
22	38	J. J. Yeley	RSS Racing	Chevrolet	29.545	182.772	30.381	177.743	—	—
23	4	Ross Chastain	JD Motorsports	Chevrolet	29.242	184.666	—	—	—	—
24	0	Garrett Smithley	JD Motorsports	Chevrolet	29.894	180.638	—	—	—	—
Eliminated in Round 2
25	01	B. J. McLeod	JD Motorsports	Chevrolet	29.936	180.385	—	—	—	—
26	15	Quin Houff	JD Motorsports	Chevrolet	29.941	180.355	—	—	—	—
27	13	Timmy Hill	MBM Motorsports	Toyota	29.992	180.048	—	—	—	—
28	99	Stephen Leicht	B. J. McLeod Motorsports	Chevrolet	30.150	179.104	—	—	—	—
29	8	Ray Black Jr.	B. J. McLeod Motorsports	Chevrolet	30.297	178.235	—	—	—	—
30	35	Joey Gase	Go Green Racing with SS-Green Light Racing	Chevrolet	30.306	178.183	—	—	—	—
31	93	Jeff Green	RSS Racing	Chevrolet	30.342	177.971	—	—	—	—
32	52	David Starr	Jimmy Means Racing	Chevrolet	30.483	177.148	—	—	—	—
33	76	Spencer Boyd	SS-Green Light Racing	Chevrolet	30.560	176.702	—	—	—	—
Qualified by owner's points
34	45	Bayley Currey	JP Motorsports	Toyota	30.659	176.131	—	—	—	—
35	66	Bobby Dale Earnhardt	MBM Motorsports	Toyota	30.690	175.953	—	—	—	—
36	78	Vinnie Miller	B. J. McLeod Motorsports	Chevrolet	30.730	175.724	—	—	—	—
37	74	Mike Harmon	Mike Harmon Racing	Chevrolet	31.109	173.583	—	—	—	—
38	60	Ty Majeski	Roush Fenway Racing	Ford	—	—	—	—	—	—
39	89	Morgan Shepherd	Shepherd Racing Ventures	Chevrolet	—	—	—	—	—	—
Withdrew
WD	55	Bayley Currey	JP Motorsports	Toyota	—	—	—	—	—	—
Official qualifying results
Official starting lineup

== Race results ==
Stage 1 Laps: 45

Pos.	#	Driver	Team	Make	Pts
1	21	Daniel Hemric	Richard Childress Racing	Chevrolet	10
2	00	Cole Custer	Stewart-Haas Racing with Biagi-DenBeste	Ford	9
3	9	Tyler Reddick	JR Motorsports	Chevrolet	8
4	20	Christopher Bell	Joe Gibbs Racing	Toyota	7
5	1	Elliott Sadler	JR Motorsports	Chevrolet	6
6	2	Matt Tifft	Richard Childress Racing	Chevrolet	5
7	7	Justin Allgaier	JR Motorsports	Chevrolet	4
8	18	Ryan Preece	Joe Gibbs Racing	Toyota	3
9	42	John Hunter Nemechek	Chip Ganassi Racing	Chevrolet	2
10	19	Brandon Jones	Joe Gibbs Racing	Toyota	1

Stage 2 Laps: 45

Pos.	#	Driver	Team	Make	Pts
1	00	Cole Custer	Stewart-Haas Racing with Biagi-DenBeste	Ford	10
2	7	Justin Allgaier	JR Motorsports	Chevrolet	9
3	18	Ryan Preece	Joe Gibbs Racing	Toyota	8
4	9	Tyler Reddick	JR Motorsports	Chevrolet	7
5	20	Christopher Bell	Joe Gibbs Racing	Toyota	6
6	1	Elliott Sadler	JR Motorsports	Chevrolet	5
7	2	Matt Tifft	Richard Childress Racing	Chevrolet	4
8	21	Daniel Hemric	Richard Childress Racing	Chevrolet	3
9	51	Jeremy Clements	Jeremy Clements Racing	Chevrolet	2
10	19	Brandon Jones	Joe Gibbs Racing	Toyota	1

Stage 3 Laps: 110

Fin	St	#	Driver	Team	Make	Laps	Led	Status	Pts
1	3	00	Cole Custer	Stewart-Haas Racing with Biagi-DenBeste	Ford	200	16	running	59
2	4	9	Tyler Reddick	JR Motorsports	Chevrolet	200	54	running	50
3	8	22	Austin Cindric	Team Penske	Ford	200	0	running	34
4	10	42	John Hunter Nemechek	Chip Ganassi Racing	Chevrolet	200	6	running	35
5	5	7	Justin Allgaier	JR Motorsports	Chevrolet	200	37	running	45
6	14	19	Brandon Jones	Joe Gibbs Racing	Toyota	200	4	running	33
7	7	2	Matt Tifft	Richard Childress Racing	Chevrolet	200	0	running	39
8	13	1	Elliott Sadler	JR Motorsports	Chevrolet	200	0	running	40
9	12	23	Spencer Gallagher	GMS Racing	Chevrolet	200	0	running	28
10	9	21	Daniel Hemric	Richard Childress Racing	Chevrolet	200	42	running	40
11	23	4	Ross Chastain	JD Motorsports	Chevrolet	200	0	running	26
12	17	39	Ryan Sieg	RSS Racing	Chevrolet	200	0	running	25
13	38	60	Ty Majeski	Roush Fenway Racing	Ford	200	0	running	24
14	18	51	Jeremy Clements	Jeremy Clements Racing	Chevrolet	200	0	running	25
15	22	38	J. J. Yeley	RSS Racing	Chevrolet	200	0	running	22
16	16	5	Michael Annett	JR Motorsports	Chevrolet	200	0	running	21
17	19	40	Chad Finchum	MBM Motorsports	Toyota	199	0	running	20
18	21	90	Brandon Brown	Brandonbilt Motorsports	Chevrolet	199	0	running	19
19	29	8	Ray Black Jr.	B. J. McLeod Motorsports	Chevrolet	199	0	running	18
20	24	0	Garrett Smithley	JD Motorsports	Chevrolet	198	0	running	17
21	34	45	Bayley Currey	JP Motorsports	Toyota	197	0	running	0
22	30	35	Joey Gase	Go Green Racing with SS-Green Light Racing	Chevrolet	197	0	running	15
23	2	3	Shane Lee	Richard Childress Racing	Chevrolet	197	6	running	14
24	32	52	David Starr	Jimmy Means Racing	Chevrolet	196	0	running	13
25	33	76	Spencer Boyd	SS-Green Light Racing	Chevrolet	195	0	running	12
26	26	15	Quin Houff	JD Motorsports	Chevrolet	193	0	running	11
27	36	78	Vinnie Miller	B. J. McLeod Motorsports	Chevrolet	193	0	running	10
28	37	74	Mike Harmon	Mike Harmon Racing	Chevrolet	192	0	running	9
29	15	16	Ryan Reed	Roush Fenway Racing	Ford	186	0	crash	8
30	20	36	Alex Labbé	DGM Racing	Chevrolet	176	0	running	7
31	6	18	Ryan Preece	Joe Gibbs Racing	Toyota	139	0	crash	17
32	1	20	Christopher Bell	Joe Gibbs Racing	Toyota	133	35	crash	18
33	11	11	Ryan Truex	Kaulig Racing	Chevrolet	120	0	crash	4
34	35	66	Bobby Dale Earnhardt	MBM Motorsports	Toyota	104	0	crash	3
35	27	13	Timmy Hill	MBM Motorsports	Toyota	56	0	vibration	2
36	25	01	B. J. McLeod	JD Motorsports	Chevrolet	44	0	electrical	1
37	28	99	Stephen Leicht	B. J. McLeod Motorsports	Chevrolet	32	0	fuel pump	1
38	31	93	Jeff Green	RSS Racing	Chevrolet	10	0	brakes	1
39	39	89	Morgan Shepherd	Shepherd Racing Ventures	Chevrolet	4	0	electrical	1
Withdrew
WD		55	Bayley Currey	JP Motorsports	Toyota				
Official race results

Previous race: 2018 Kansas Lottery 300	NASCAR Xfinity Series; 2018 season	Next race: 2018 Whelen Trusted to Perform 200
