= Bobby Dale Earnhardt =

American racing driver (born 1987)

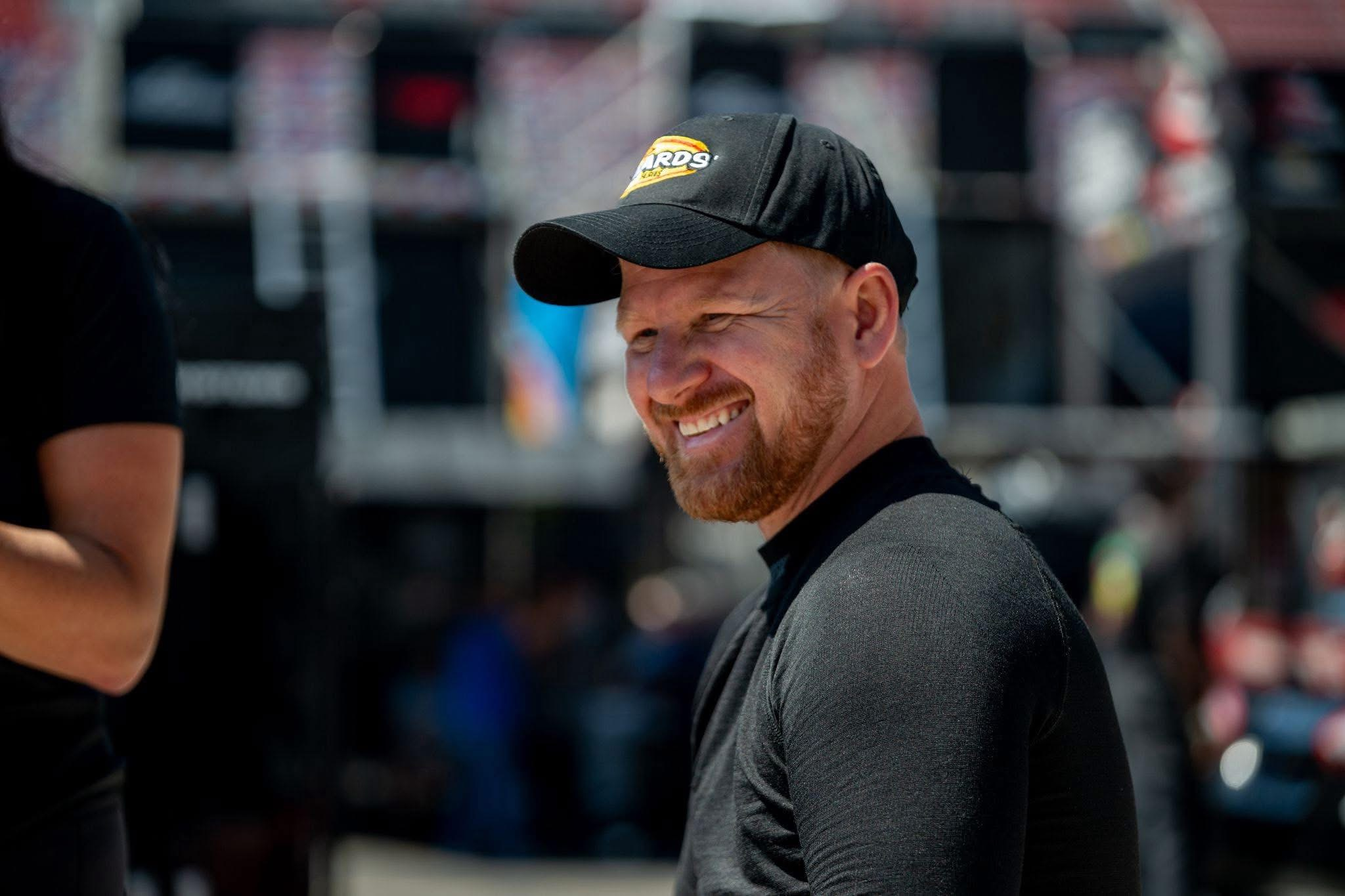
- Earnhardt at Bristol Motor Speedway in 2025
- Born: September 1, 1987 (age 39); Mooresville, North Carolina, U.S.

NASCAR O'Reilly Auto Parts Series career
- 7 races run over 3 years
- 2019 position: 68th
- Best finish: 68th (2019)
- First race: 2017 Virginia 529 College Savings 250 (Richmond)
- Last race: 2019 Desert Diamond Casino West Valley 200 (Phoenix)
Wins	Top tens	Poles
0	0	0

ARCA Menards Series career
- 20 races run over 3 years
- Best finish: 13th (2026)
- First race: 2017 Menards 200 (Toledo)
- Last race: 2026 Menards 150 (Kansas)
Wins	Top tens	Poles
0	1	0

ARCA Menards Series East career
- 4 races run over 2 years
- Best finish: 37th (2026)
- First race: 2025 Bush's Beans 200 (Bristol)
- Last race: 2026 Bush's Best 200 (Bristol)
Wins	Top tens	Poles
0	0	0

ARCA Menards Series West career
- 1 race run over 1 year
- Best finish: 88th (2026)
- First race: 2026 General Tire 150 (Phoenix)
Wins	Top tens	Poles
0	0	0
- Statistics up to date as of November 2, 2026.

Bobby Dale Earnhardt (born September 1, 1987) is an American professional stock car racing driver. He last competed part-time in the ARCA Menards Series, driving the No. 89 Chevrolet for Rise Racing with Earnhardt-Shearer Racing.

== Racing career ==
Earnhardt raced in the ARCA Truck Series from 2013 to 2016, where he won Rookie of the Year in 2013. On May 21, 2017, he made his major stock car debut in the ARCA Racing Series at Toledo Speedway, driving the No. 3 Chevrolet for Hixson Motorsports. He started 24th, and finished 21st after a crash on lap 165.

On September 8, 2017, Earnhardt made his NASCAR Xfinity Series debut in the No. 40 Chevrolet for MBM Motorsports at Richmond International Raceway. He qualified 40th for the race and finished 34th. Earnhardt had been scheduled to make his debut in the series on July 29 at Iowa Speedway, in the same team's No. 13 Chevrolet, but he failed to qualify for that race.

On September 1, 2025, it was announced that Earnhardt would return to the now named ARCA Menards Series at Bristol Motor Speedway.

On November 19, 2025, it was revealed that Earnhardt will run the full ARCA Menards Series schedule for Rise Motorsports (which would later be renamed as Rise Racing) for the 2026 season. He also participated with the team in the pre-season test at Daytona International Speedway, where he set the 35th quickest time between the two sessions held.

In 2026, Earnhardt began his first full-time season in the ARCA Menards Series, driving the No. 89 Chevrolet for Rise Racing. In the season-opening race at Daytona International Speedway, he qualified seventh and finished ninth, earning his first career ARCA Menards Series top-ten finish.

At the following race at Phoenix Raceway, Earnhardt qualified 29th but did not finish after being involved in a multi-car accident on the opening lap.

== Family life ==
Earnhardt comes from a four-generation stock car racing family. He is the eldest son of former driver Kerry Earnhardt and the eldest grandson of NASCAR Hall of Fame driver Dale Earnhardt. Through his paternal lineage, he is also the great-grandson of racer Ralph Earnhardt.

He is the older brother of racing driver Jeffrey Earnhardt and the nephew of NASCAR driver Dale Earnhardt Jr.. Earnhardt also has a paternal half-sister, Kayla Earnhardt, and two maternal half-brothers, James Ray and David.

Earnhardt is married to Kimberly Earnhardt, and the couple have four children together, two sons and two daughters.

== Motorsports career results ==
=== Stock car career summary ===
Season	Series	Team	Races	Wins	Top 5	Top 10	Points	Position
2017	ARCA Racing Series	Hixson Motorsports	2	0	0	0	390	49th
2017	ARCA Racing Series	Brian Kaltreider Racing	1	0	0	0	390	49th
2017	NASCAR Xfinity Series	MBM Motorsports	2	0	0	0	9	71st
2018	NASCAR Xfinity Series	MBM Motorsports	2	0	0	0	13	70th
2019	NASCAR Xfinity Series	MBM Motorsports	3	0	0	0	16	68th
2025	ARCA Menards Series East	Rise Motorsports	1	0	0	0	14	73rd
2025	ARCA Menards Series	Rise Motorsports	2	0	0	0	32	107th
2026	ARCA Menards Series West	Rise Racing with Earnhardt-Shearer Racing	1	0	0	0	7	88th
2026	ARCA Menards Series East	Rise Racing with Earnhardt-Shearer Racing	3	0	0	0	68	37th
2026	ARCA Menards Series	Rise Racing with Earnhardt-Shearer Racing	15	0	0	1	454	13th

=== NASCAR ===
(key) (Bold – Pole position awarded by qualifying time. Italics – Pole position earned by points standings or practice time. * – Most laps led.)

==== Xfinity Series ====
NASCAR Xfinity Series results
Year	Team	No.	Make	1	2	3	4	5	6	7	8	9	10	11	12	13	14	15	16	17	18	19	20	21	22	23	24	25	26	27	28	29	30	31	32	33	NXSC	Pts	Ref
2017	MBM Motorsports	13	Chevy	DAY	ATL	LVS	PHO	CAL	TEX	BRI	RCH	TAL	CLT	DOV	POC	MCH	IOW	DAY	KEN	NHA	IND	IOW; DNQ	GLN	MOH	BRI	ROA	DAR										71st	9	
2017	MBM Motorsports	40	Chevy																									RCH; 34	CHI	KEN	DOV	CLT	KAN; 31	TEX	PHO	HOM	71st	9	
2018	MBM Motorsports	66	Toyota	DAY	ATL	LVS	PHO	CAL	TEX	BRI	RCH	TAL	DOV	CLT	POC	MCH	IOW	CHI	DAY	KEN	NHA	IOW	GLN	MOH	BRI	ROA	DAR	IND	LVS	RCH	CLT	DOV	KAN; 27	TEX; 34	PHO	HOM	70th	13	
2019	MBM Motorsports	66	Toyota	DAY	ATL	LVS	PHO	CAL	TEX	BRI	RCH	TAL	DOV	CLT	POC	MCH	IOW	CHI	DAY	KEN	NHA	IOW	GLN	MOH	BRI	ROA	DAR	IND	LVS	RCH	CLT	DOV	KAN; 31	TEX; 37	PHO; 28	HOM; DNQ	68th	16	

^{*} Season still in progress
^{1} Ineligible for series points

=== ARCA Menards Series ===
(key) (Bold – Pole position awarded by qualifying time. Italics – Pole position earned by points standings or practice time. * – Most laps led.)

ARCA Menards Series results
Year	Team	No.	Make	1	2	3	4	5	6	7	8	9	10	11	12	13	14	15	16	17	18	19	20	AMSC	Pts	Ref
2017	Hixson Motorsports	3	Chevy	DAY	NSH	SLM	TAL	TOL; 21	ELK; 19														KAN; Wth	49th	390	
2017	Brian Kaltreider Racing	96	Ford							POC; 25	MCH	MAD	IOW	IRP	POC	WIN	ISF	ROA	DSF	SLM	CHI	KEN		49th	390	
2025	Rise Motorsports	31	Toyota	DAY	PHO	TAL	KAN	CLT	MCH	BLN	ELK	LRP	DOV	IRP	IOW	GLN	ISF	MAD	DSF	BRI; 30	SLM	KAN; 26	TOL	107th	32	
2026	Rise Racing with Earnhardt-Shearer Racing	89	Chevy	DAY; 9	PHO; 37	KAN; 13	TAL; 31	GLN; 28	TOL; 15	MCH; 25	POC; 23	BER; 15	ELK; 11	CHI; 19	LRP; 20	IRP	IOW; 16	ISF	MAD	DSF	SLM	BRI; 33	KAN; 11	13th	454	

==== ARCA Menards Series East ====
ARCA Menards Series East results
Year	Team	No.	Make	1	2	3	4	5	6	7	8	AMSEC	Pts	Ref
2025	Rise Motorsports	31	Toyota	FIF	CAR	NSV	FRS	DOV	IRP	IOW	BRI; 30	73rd	14	
2026	Rise Racing with Earnhardt-Shearer Racing	89	Chevy	HCY	CAR	NSV	TOL; 15	IRP	FRS	IOW; 16	BRI; 33	37th	68	

==== ARCA Menards Series West ====
ARCA Menards Series West results
Year	Team	No.	Make	1	2	3	4	5	6	7	8	9	10	11	12	13	AMSWC	Pts	Ref
2026	Rise Racing with Earnhardt-Shearer Racing	89	Chevy	KER	PHO; 37	TUC	SHA	CNS	TRI	SON	PIR	AAS	MAD	LVS	PHO	KER	88th	7	
