= 2016 ARCA Truck Series =

18th season of the ARCA Truck Series

Seasons
- ← 2015 none →

The 2016 ARCA Truck Series was the 18th and final season of the ARCA Truck Series. The season began on May 21 with the Safety Kleen 50 and ended on October 15 with the Lincoln Welders 125. Shawn Szep won the championship on the strength of 7 wins. He would be the final champion in series history.

Billy Strehle, who would go on to operate the successor to the ARCA Truck Series, the CRS Truck Series, finished second in the championship standings, 309 points behind Szep. Brad Yunker finished third in the series points.

Armani Williams donated a firesuit he wore during the season to The Henry Ford's collection.

== Schedule ==
| No. | Race title | Track | Date |
|---|---|---|---|
| 1 | Safety Kleen 50 | Toledo Speedway | May 21 |
| 2 | Lincoln Welders 100 | Painesville Speedway | June 11 |
| 3 | ARCATruckRacing.com 75 | Angola Motorsport Speedway | June 25 |
| 4 | Phoenix Management Group 100 | Shady Bowl Speedway | July 2 |
| 5 | ARCATruckRacing.com 100 | Lorain Raceway Park | July 9 |
| 6 | ARCATruckRacing.com 75 | Columbus Motor Speedway | July 23 |
| 7 | ARCATruckRacing.com 50 | Angola Motorsport Speedway | July 30 |
| 8 | Door 2 Delivery 100 | Midvale Speedway | August 6 |
| 9 | ARCATruckRacing.com 100 | Lorain Raceway Park | October 2 |
| 10 | Lincoln Welders 125 | Painesville Speedway | October 15 |

- Note: some races were rescheduled due to rain. The final race dates are shown in the table.

== Results and standings ==
=== Races ===
| No. | Race | Pole position | Most laps led | Winning driver | Manufacturer | No. |
|---|---|---|---|---|---|---|
| 1 | Safety Kleen 50 | Bob Mikolajczyk | Shawn Szep | Shawn Szep | Chevrolet | 81 |
| 2 | Lincoln Welders 100 | Billy Strehle | Billy Strehle | Shawn Szep | Chevrolet | 81 |
| 3 | ARCATruckRacing.com 75 | Brian Taylor | John Gearhart | Chad Poorman | Chevrolet | 88 |
| 4 | Phoenix Management Group 100 | Armani Williams | Shawn Szep | Shawn Szep | Chevrolet | 81 |
| 5 | ARCATruckRacing.com 100 | Stan Maitlen | Shawn Szep | Shawn Szep | Chevrolet | 81 |
| 6 | ARCATruckRacing.com 75 | Randy Moyes Jr. | Shawn Szep | Shawn Szep | Chevrolet | 81 |
| 7 | ARCATruckRacing.com 50 | Brian Taylor | John Gearhart | John Gearhart | Chevrolet | 8 |
| 8 | Door 2 Delivery 100 | Jeff Smith | Shawn Szep | Shawn Szep | Chevrolet | 81 |
| 9 | ARCATruckRacing.com 100 | Tyler Kish | Cody Quarrick | Cody Quarrick | Ford | 6 |
| 10 | Lincoln Welders 125 | Brandon Huff | Shawn Szep | Shawn Szep | Chevrolet | 81 |

=== Drivers' championship ===
(key) Bold – Pole position. * – Most laps led.

| Pos | Driver | TOL | PAI | ANG | SHA | LOR | COL | ANG | MID | LOR | PAI | Points |
|---|---|---|---|---|---|---|---|---|---|---|---|---|
| 1 | Shawn Szep | **1*** | 1 | 2 | 1* | 1* | 1* | 3 | 1* | 2 | 1* | 2784 |
| 2 | Billy Strehle | 15 | **2*** | 7 | 4 | 3 | 7 | 5 | 2 | 11 | 2 | 2475 |
| 3 | Brad Yunker | 2 | 6 | 13 | 9 | 2 | 5 | 4 | 4 | 4 | 4 | 2444 |
| 4 | Brandon Huff | 3 | 7 | 5 | 7 | 7 | 2 | 2 | 7 | 6 | **12** | 2442 |
| 5 | Brian Taylor | 10 | 3 | **6** | 10 | 4 | 4 | **7** | 8 | 3 | 10 | 2342 |
| 6 | Tyler Kish | 6 | 4 | 11 | 6 | 10 | 8 | 8 | 9 | **8** | 9 | 2205 |
| 7 | Armani Williams | 4 | 5 | 9 | **5** | 5 | 10 | 9 | 5 | 9 | | 1981 |
| 8 | Jeff Smith | | | 8 | 3 | 11 | 11 | 6 | **6** | 7 | 7 | 1697 |
| 9 | Kim Hughes | 12 | 8 | 12 | | | | | | 12 | 6 | 957 |
| 10 | Stan Maitlen | 5 | 9 | 10 | 11 | **6** | | | | | | 829 |
| 11 | Cody Quarrick | | | | | | | | 3 | 1* | 5 | 718 |
| 12 | Randy Moyes Jr. | 8 | | | | 8 | **6** | | | 14 | | 554 |
| 13 | John Gearhart | | | 4* | | | | 1* | | | | 475 |
| 14 | Nick Walentowski | 16 | 10 | | | | | | | 13 | 14 | 455 |
| 15 | Brian Brewer | | | | | | | | | 5 | 3 | 446 |
| 16 | Todd Gearhart | | | 3 | 8 | | | | | | | 436 |
| 17 | Kent McCloskey | | | | | 9 | 9 | | | | | 387 |
| 18 | Chad Poorman | | | 1 | 2 | | | | | | | 281 |
| 19 | Rich Gleason | 7 | | | | | | | | | | 232 |
| 20 | Jeff Myers Jr. | | | | | | 3 | | | QL^{†} | 15 | 225 |
| 21 | Bobby Dale Earnhardt | 9 | | | | | | | | | | 218 |
| 22 | Frank Wilson Jr. | 13 | | | | | | | | | | 199 |
| 23 | Jess Drook | | | | | | | | | | 8 | 194 |
| 24 | Katlynn Leer | 14 | | | | | | | | | | 191 |
| 25 | Bob Mikolajczyk | 11 | | | | | | | | | | 191 |
| 26 | Bill Harkins | | | | | | | | | | 13 | 186 |
| 27 | Rick Funnel | | | | | | | | | 10 | | 184 |
| 28 | Jeremy Hill | | | | | | | | | | 11 | 182 |

† Qualified for Kim Hughes

== See also ==
- 2016 NASCAR Sprint Cup Series
- 2016 NASCAR Xfinity Series
- 2016 NASCAR Camping World Truck Series
- 2016 NASCAR K&N Pro Series East
- 2016 NASCAR K&N Pro Series West
- 2016 NASCAR Whelen Modified Tour
- 2016 NASCAR Whelen Southern Modified Tour
- 2016 NASCAR Pinty's Series
- 2016 NASCAR Whelen Euro Series
- 2016 ARCA Racing Series
