= 2021 Toyota 200 =

2021 Toyota 200 presented by CK Power
Race details
- Race 16 of 22 of the 2021 NASCAR Camping World Truck Series
- Date: August 20, 2021
- Official name: Toyota 200 presented by CK Power
- Location: Madison, Illinois, Gateway Motorsports Park
- Course: Permanent racing facility
- Course length: 1.25 miles (2.01 km)
- Distance: 163 laps, 203.75 mi (327.956 km)
- Scheduled distance: 160 laps, 200 mi (321.868 km)
- Average speed: 80.684 miles per hour (129.848 km/h)

Pole position
Driver	Austin Hill	Hattori Racing Enterprises
- Grid positions set by competition-based formula

Most laps led
Driver	Sheldon Creed	GMS Racing
- Laps: 142

Winner
No. 2	Sheldon Creed	GMS Racing

Television in the United States
- Network: Fox Sports 1
- Announcers: Vince Welch, Michael Waltrip, and Kurt Busch

Radio in the United States
- Radio: Motor Racing Network

The 2021 Toyota 200 presented by CK Power was the 16th stock car race of the 2021 NASCAR Camping World Truck Series season, the 21st iteration of the event, the first race of the playoffs, and the first race of the Round of 10. The race was held on Friday, August 20, 2021 in Madison, Illinois at Gateway Motorsports Park. The race was extended from 160 laps to 163 due to an overtime finish. After dominating most of the race, Sheldon Creed of GMS Racing would win the race and lock himself into the Round of 8. To fill the rest of the podium, Matt Crafton and Ben Rhodes, both from ThorSport Racing would finish 2nd and 3rd, respectively.

The race was the debut for Chris Hacker and Armani Williams.

== Background ==
Known as Gateway Motorsports Park until its renaming in April 2019, World Wide Technology Raceway is a 1.25-mile (2.01 km) paved oval motor racing track in Madison, Illinois, United States. The track previously held Truck races from 1998 to 2010, and returned starting in 2014.

=== Entry list ===
#	Driver	Team	Make
1	Hailie Deegan	David Gilliland Racing	Ford
2	Sheldon Creed	GMS Racing	Chevrolet
02	Kris Wright	Young's Motorsports	Chevrolet
3	Jordan Anderson	Jordan Anderson Racing	Chevrolet
4	John Hunter Nemechek	Kyle Busch Motorsports	Toyota
04	Cory Roper	Roper Racing	Ford
6	Norm Benning*	Norm Benning Racing	Chevrolet
9	Grant Enfinger	CR7 Motorsports	Chevrolet
10	Jennifer Jo Cobb	Jennifer Jo Cobb Racing	Ford
11	Spencer Davis**	Spencer Davis Motorsports	Toyota
12	Tate Fogleman	Young's Motorsports	Chevrolet
13	Johnny Sauter	ThorSport Racing	Toyota
15	Tanner Gray	David Gilliland Racing	Ford
16	Austin Hill	Hattori Racing Enterprises	Toyota
17	Taylor Gray	David Gilliland Racing	Ford
18	Chandler Smith	Kyle Busch Motorsports	Toyota
19	Derek Kraus	McAnally–Hilgemann Racing	Toyota
20	Spencer Boyd	Young's Motorsports	Chevrolet
21	Zane Smith	GMS Racing	Chevrolet
22	Austin Wayne Self	AM Racing	Chevrolet
23	Chase Purdy	GMS Racing	Chevrolet
24	Jack Wood	GMS Racing	Chevrolet
25	Josh Berry	Rackley W.A.R.	Chevrolet
26	Tyler Ankrum	GMS Racing	Chevrolet
30	Danny Bohn	On Point Motorsports	Toyota
31	Chris Hacker	On Point Motorsports	Toyota
33	Armani Williams	Reaume Brothers Racing	Toyota
34	Lawless Alan***	Reaume Brothers Racing	Toyota
38	Todd Gilliland	Front Row Motorsports	Ford
40	Ryan Truex	Niece Motorsports	Chevrolet
41	Dawson Cram	Cram Racing Enterprises	Chevrolet
42	Carson Hocevar	Niece Motorsports	Chevrolet
45	Jake Griffin	Niece Motorsports	Chevrolet
49	Roger Reuse	CMI Motorsports	Ford
51	Derek Griffith	Kyle Busch Motorsports	Toyota
52	Stewart Friesen	Halmar Friesen Racing	Toyota
56	Tyler Hill	Hill Motorsports	Chevrolet
66	Ty Majeski	ThorSport Racing	Toyota
68	Clay Greenfield	Clay Greenfield Motorsports	Toyota
88	Matt Crafton	ThorSport Racing	Toyota
98	Christian Eckes	ThorSport Racing	Toyota
99	Ben Rhodes	ThorSport Racing	Toyota
Official entry list

*Withdrew due to the team breaking the rules, as they did not know they had run an illegal nose on the car. NASCAR rules state that 2018 bodies for the car after June 30, 2021 are only allowed for dirt races and road courses, and as Norm Benning had a 2018 body, they were forced to withdraw.

**Withdrew for unknown reasons.

***Driver changed to Chris Hacker in order for Hacker to make his NASCAR Camping World Truck Series debut.

== Starting lineup ==
Qualifying was determined by a qualifying metric system based on the previous race, the 2021 United Rentals 176 at The Glen and owner's points. As a result, Austin Hill of Hattori Racing Enterprises would win the pole.

The entry of Clay Greenfield of Clay Greenfield Motorsports and the initial entry of Chris Hacker for On Point Motorsports would fail to qualify, albeit Hacker would replace Lawless Alan in the #34 Reaume Brothers Racing truck to ensure that he would make his debut.

Pos.	#	Driver	Team	Make
1	16	Austin Hill	Hattori Racing Enterprises	Toyota
2	4	John Hunter Nemechek	Kyle Busch Motorsports	Toyota
3	38	Todd Gilliland	Front Row Motorsports	Ford
4	2	Sheldon Creed	GMS Racing	Chevrolet
5	21	Zane Smith	GMS Racing	Chevrolet
6	42	Carson Hocevar	Niece Motorsports	Chevrolet
7	99	Ben Rhodes	ThorSport Racing	Toyota
8	98	Christian Eckes	ThorSport Racing	Toyota
9	52	Stewart Friesen	Halmar Friesen Racing	Toyota
10	88	Matt Crafton	ThorSport Racing	Toyota
11	51	Derek Griffith	Kyle Busch Motorsports	Toyota
12	18	Chandler Smith	Kyle Busch Motorsports	Toyota
13	26	Tyler Ankrum	GMS Racing	Chevrolet
14	25	Josh Berry	Rackley W.A.R.	Chevrolet
15	22	Austin Wayne Self	AM Racing	Chevrolet
16	15	Tanner Gray	David Gilliland Racing	Ford
17	19	Derek Kraus	McAnally–Hilgemann Racing	Toyota
18	40	Ryan Truex	Niece Motorsports	Chevrolet
19	1	Hailie Deegan	David Gilliland Racing	Ford
20	13	Johnny Sauter	ThorSport Racing	Toyota
21	24	Jack Wood	GMS Racing	Chevrolet
22	02	Kris Wright	Young's Motorsports	Chevrolet
23	30	Danny Bohn	On Point Motorsports	Toyota
24	12	Tate Fogleman	Young's Motorsports	Chevrolet
25	66	Ty Majeski	ThorSport Racing	Toyota
26	17	Taylor Gray	David Gilliland Racing	Ford
27	56	Tyler Hill	Hill Motorsports	Chevrolet
28	23	Chase Purdy	GMS Racing	Chevrolet
29	45	Jake Griffin	Niece Motorsports	Chevrolet
30	9	Grant Enfinger	CR7 Motorsports	Chevrolet
31	34	Chris Hacker	Reaume Brothers Racing	Toyota
32	20	Spencer Boyd	Young's Motorsports	Chevrolet
33	3	Jordan Anderson	Jordan Anderson Racing	Chevrolet
34	49	Roger Reuse	CMI Motorsports	Ford
35	10	Jennifer Jo Cobb	Jennifer Jo Cobb Racing	Ford
36	33	Armani Williams	Reaume Brothers Racing	Toyota
37	04	Cory Roper	Roper Racing	Ford
38	41	Dawson Cram	Cram Racing Enterprises	Chevrolet
Failed to qualify or withdrew
41	31	Chris Hacker	On Point Motorsports	Toyota
42	68	Clay Greenfield	Clay Greenfield Motorsports	Toyota
WD	6	Norm Benning	Norm Benning Racing	Chevrolet
WD	11	Spencer Davis	Spencer Davis Motorsports	Toyota
Official starting lineup

== Race results ==
Stage 1 Laps: 55

Fin	#	Driver	Team	Make	Pts
1	2	Sheldon Creed	GMS Racing	Chevrolet	10
2	52	Stewart Friesen	Halmar Friesen Racing	Toyota	9
3	99	Ben Rhodes	ThorSport Racing	Toyota	8
4	21	Zane Smith	GMS Racing	Chevrolet	7
5	66	Ty Majeski	ThorSport Racing	Toyota	6
6	38	Todd Gilliland	Front Row Motorsports	Ford	5
7	88	Matt Crafton	ThorSport Racing	Toyota	4
8	16	Austin Hill	Hattori Racing Enterprises	Toyota	3
9	4	John Hunter Nemechek	Kyle Busch Motorsports	Toyota	2
10	19	Derek Kraus	McAnally–Hilgemann Racing	Toyota	1

Stage 2 Laps: 55

Fin	#	Driver	Team	Make	Pts
1	2	Sheldon Creed	GMS Racing	Chevrolet	10
2	99	Ben Rhodes	ThorSport Racing	Toyota	9
3	88	Matt Crafton	ThorSport Racing	Toyota	8
4	4	John Hunter Nemechek	Kyle Busch Motorsports	Toyota	7
5	52	Stewart Friesen	Halmar Friesen Racing	Toyota	6
6	66	Ty Majeski	ThorSport Racing	Toyota	5
7	19	Derek Kraus	McAnally–Hilgemann Racing	Toyota	4
8	26	Tyler Ankrum	GMS Racing	Chevrolet	3
9	98	Christian Eckes	ThorSport Racing	Toyota	2
10	16	Austin Hill	Hattori Racing Enterprises	Toyota	1

Stage 3 Laps: 50

Fin	St	#	Driver	Team	Make	Laps	Led	Status	Pts
1	4	2	Sheldon Creed	GMS Racing	Chevrolet	163	142	running	60
2	10	88	Matt Crafton	ThorSport Racing	Toyota	163	0	running	47
3	7	99	Ben Rhodes	ThorSport Racing	Toyota	163	0	running	51
4	9	52	Stewart Friesen	Halmar Friesen Racing	Toyota	163	0	running	48
5	20	13	Johnny Sauter	ThorSport Racing	Toyota	163	0	running	32
6	28	23	Chase Purdy	GMS Racing	Chevrolet	163	0	running	31
7	19	1	Hailie Deegan	David Gilliland Racing	Ford	163	0	running	30
8	6	42	Carson Hocevar	Niece Motorsports	Chevrolet	163	0	running	29
9	15	22	Austin Wayne Self	AM Racing	Chevrolet	163	0	running	28
10	21	24	Jack Wood	GMS Racing	Chevrolet	163	0	running	27
11	27	56	Tyler Hill	Hill Motorsports	Chevrolet	163	0	running	26
12	26	17	Taylor Gray	David Gilliland Racing	Ford	163	0	running	25
13	18	40	Ryan Truex	Niece Motorsports	Chevrolet	162	0	running	24
14	24	12	Tate Fogleman	Young's Motorsports	Chevrolet	162	0	running	23
15	14	25	Josh Berry	Rackley W.A.R.	Chevrolet	162	0	running	0
16	32	20	Spencer Boyd	Young's Motorsports	Chevrolet	161	0	running	21
17	37	04	Cory Roper	Roper Racing	Ford	161	0	running	20
18	22	02	Kris Wright	Young's Motorsports	Chevrolet	161	0	running	19
19	16	15	Tanner Gray	David Gilliland Racing	Ford	161	0	running	18
20	17	19	Derek Kraus	McAnally–Hilgemann Racing	Toyota	160	0	running	22
21	36	33	Armani Williams	Reaume Brothers Racing	Toyota	159	0	running	16
22	2	4	John Hunter Nemechek	Kyle Busch Motorsports	Toyota	158	0	running	24
23	1	16	Austin Hill	Hattori Racing Enterprises	Toyota	157	2	running	18
24	34	49	Roger Reuse	CMI Motorsports	Ford	157	0	running	13
25	30	9	Grant Enfinger	CR7 Motorsports	Chevrolet	154	0	running	12
26	11	51	Derek Griffith	Kyle Busch Motorsports	Toyota	150	0	running	11
27	31	34	Chris Hacker	Reaume Brothers Racing	Toyota	140	0	running	10
28	12	18	Chandler Smith	Kyle Busch Motorsports	Toyota	123	0	running	9
29	3	38	Todd Gilliland	Front Row Motorsports	Ford	120	0	dvp	13
30	38	41	Dawson Cram	Cram Racing Enterprises	Chevrolet	117	0	accident	7
31	8	98	Christian Eckes	ThorSport Racing	Toyota	113	0	accident	8
32	13	26	Tyler Ankrum	GMS Racing	Chevrolet	112	0	accident	8
33	25	66	Ty Majeski	ThorSport Racing	Toyota	112	0	accident	15
34	29	45	Jake Griffin	Niece Motorsports	Chevrolet	112	0	accident	3
35	5	21	Zane Smith	GMS Racing	Chevrolet	99	19	rear gear	9
36	23	30	Danny Bohn	On Point Motorsports	Toyota	94	0	engine	1
37	33	3	Jordan Anderson	Jordan Anderson Racing	Chevrolet	68	0	engine	1
38	35	10	Jennifer Jo Cobb	Jennifer Jo Cobb Racing	Ford	28	0	engine	1
Official race results

Previous race: 2021 United Rentals 176 at The Glen	NASCAR Camping World Truck Series; 2021 season	Next race: 2021 In It To Win It 200
