= 2019 O'Reilly Auto Parts 300 =

Race details
- Race 31 of 33 in the 2019 NASCAR Xfinity Series season
- Date: November 2, 2019
- Location: Texas Motor Speedway in Fort Worth, Texas
- Course: Permanent racing facility
- Course length: 1.5 miles (2.4 km)
- Distance: 200 laps, 300 mi (480 km)

Pole position
Driver	Tyler Reddick	Richard Childress Racing
- Time: 28.316

Most laps led
Driver	Christopher Bell	Joe Gibbs Racing
- Laps: 101

Winner
No. 20	Christopher Bell	Joe Gibbs Racing

Television in the United States
- Network: NBCSN

Radio in the United States
- Radio: MRN

The 2019 O'Reilly Auto Parts 300 is a NASCAR Xfinity Series race held on November 2, 2019, at Texas Motor Speedway in Fort Worth, Texas. Contested over 200 laps on the 1.5-mile (2.4 km) asphalt speedway, it was the 31st race of the 2019 NASCAR Xfinity Series season, fifth race of the Playoffs, and the second race of the Round of 8.

== Background ==
=== Track ===
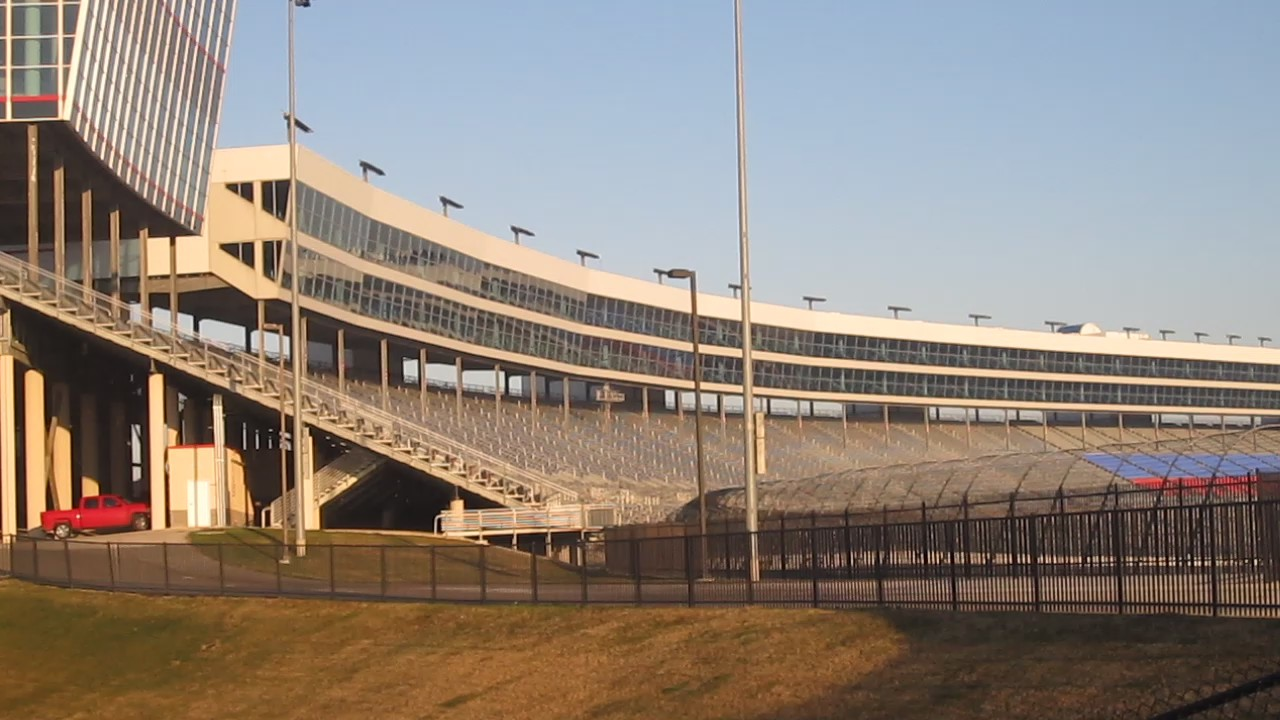
Texas Motor Speedway, the track where the race was held.

Texas Motor Speedway is a speedway located in the northernmost portion of the U.S. city of Fort Worth, Texas – the portion located in Denton County, Texas. The track measures 1.5 miles (2.4 km) around and is banked 24 degrees in the turns, and is of the oval design, where the front straightaway juts outward slightly. The track layout is similar to Atlanta Motor Speedway and Charlotte Motor Speedway (formerly Lowe's Motor Speedway). The track is owned by Speedway Motorsports, Inc., the same company that owns Atlanta and Charlotte Motor Speedways, as well as the short-track Bristol Motor Speedway.

== Entry list ==
No.	Driver	Team	Manufacturer
00	Cole Custer	Stewart-Haas Racing with Biagi-DenBeste Racing	Ford
0	Garrett Smithley	JD Motorsports	Chevrolet
01	Stephen Leicht	JD Motorsports	Chevrolet
1	Michael Annett	JR Motorsports	Chevrolet
2	Tyler Reddick	Richard Childress Racing	Chevrolet
4	B. J. McLeod	JD Motorsports	Chevrolet
5	Vinnie Miller	B. J. McLeod Motorsports	Chevrolet
07	Ray Black Jr.	SS-Green Light Racing	Chevrolet
7	Justin Allgaier	JR Motorsports	Chevrolet
08	Gray Gaulding (R)	SS-Green Light Racing	Chevrolet
8	Jeb Burton	JR Motorsports	Chevrolet
9	Noah Gragson (R)	JR Motorsports	Chevrolet
10	Ross Chastain (i)	Kaulig Racing	Chevrolet
11	Justin Haley (R)	Kaulig Racing	Chevrolet
13	Timmy Hill	MBM Motorsports	Toyota
15	Stefan Parsons	JD Motorsports	Chevrolet
17	Kyle Weatherman	Rick Ware Racing	Chevrolet
18	Harrison Burton (i)	Joe Gibbs Racing	Toyota
19	Brandon Jones	Joe Gibbs Racing	Toyota
20	Christopher Bell	Joe Gibbs Racing	Toyota
22	Austin Cindric	Team Penske	Ford
23	John Hunter Nemechek (R)	GMS Racing	Chevrolet
35	Joey Gase	MBM Motorsports	Toyota
36	Josh Williams	DGM Racing	Chevrolet
38	J. J. Yeley	RSS Racing	Chevrolet
39	Ryan Sieg	RSS Racing	Chevrolet
51	Jeremy Clements	Jeremy Clements Racing	Chevrolet
52	David Starr	Jimmy Means Racing	Chevrolet
61	Chad Finchum	MBM Motorsports	Toyota
66	Bobby Dale Earnhardt	MBM Motorsports	Toyota
74	Bayley Currey (i)	Mike Harmon Racing	Chevrolet
78	Matt Mills	B. J. McLeod Motorsports	Chevrolet
86	Brandon Brown (R)	Brandonbilt Motorsports	Chevrolet
89	Landon Cassill	Shepherd Racing Ventures	Chevrolet
90	Ronnie Bassett Jr.	DGM Racing	Chevrolet
93	C. J. McLaughlin	RSS Racing	Chevrolet
98	Chase Briscoe (R)	Stewart-Haas Racing with Biagi-DenBeste Racing	Ford
99	Josh Bilicki	B. J. McLeod Motorsports	Toyota

== Practice ==
=== First practice ===
Tyler Reddick was the fastest in the first practice session with a time of 28.801 seconds and a speed of 187.493 mph (301.741 km/h).

Pos	No.	Driver	Team	Manufacturer	Time	Speed
1	2	Tyler Reddick	Richard Childress Racing	Chevrolet	28.801	187.493
2	20	Christopher Bell	Joe Gibbs Racing	Toyota	28.969	186.406
3	00	Cole Custer	Stewart-Haas Racing with Biagi-DenBeste Racing	Ford	29.153	185.230

=== Final practice ===
Ross Chastain was the fastest in the final practice session with a time of 28.733 seconds and a speed of 187.937 mph (302.455 km/h).

Pos	No.	Driver	Team	Manufacturer	Time	Speed
1	10	Ross Chastain (i)	Kaulig Racing	Chevrolet	28.733	187.937
2	20	Christopher Bell	Joe Gibbs Racing	Toyota	28.846	187.201
3	2	Tyler Reddick	Richard Childress Racing	Chevrolet	28.875	187.013

== Qualifying ==
Tyler Reddick scored the pole for the race with a time of 28.316 seconds and a speed of 190.705 mph (306.910 km/h).

=== Qualifying results ===
Pos	No	Driver	Team	Manufacturer	Time
1	2	Tyler Reddick	Richard Childress Racing	Chevrolet	28.316
2	18	Harrison Burton (i)	Joe Gibbs Racing	Toyota	28.348
3	20	Christopher Bell	Joe Gibbs Racing	Toyota	28.352
4	00	Cole Custer	Stewart-Haas Racing with Biagi-DenBeste Racing	Ford	28.426
5	98	Chase Briscoe (R)	Stewart-Haas Racing with Biagi-DenBeste Racing	Ford	28.497
6	7	Justin Allgaier	JR Motorsports	Chevrolet	28.515
7	10	Ross Chastain (i)	Kaulig Racing	Chevrolet	28.557
8	8	Jeb Burton	JR Motorsports	Chevrolet	28.559
9	19	Brandon Jones	Joe Gibbs Racing	Toyota	28.563
10	9	Noah Gragson (R)	JR Motorsports	Chevrolet	28.630
11	23	John Hunter Nemechek (R)	GMS Racing	Chevrolet	28.812
12	51	Jeremy Clements	Jeremy Clements Racing	Chevrolet	28.852
13	86	Brandon Brown (R)	Brandonbilt Motorsports	Chevrolet	28.915
14	22	Austin Cindric	Team Penske	Ford	29.015
15	4	B. J. McLeod	JD Motorsports	Chevrolet	29.032
16	15	Stefan Parsons	JD Motorsports	Chevrolet	29.118
17	07	Ray Black Jr.	SS-Green Light Racing	Chevrolet	29.140
18	74	Bayley Currey (i)	Mike Harmon Racing	Chevrolet	29.208
19	1	Michael Annett	JR Motorsports	Chevrolet	29.241
20	90	Ronnie Bassett Jr.	DGM Racing	Chevrolet	29.319
21	39	Ryan Sieg	RSS Racing	Chevrolet	29.339
22	08	Gray Gaulding (R)	SS-Green Light Racing	Chevrolet	29.354
23	89	Landon Cassill	Shepherd Racing Ventures	Chevrolet	29.407
24	36	Josh Williams	DGM Racing	Chevrolet	29.478
25	38	J. J. Yeley	RSS Racing	Chevrolet	29.499
26	78	Matt Mills	B. J. McLeod Motorsports	Chevrolet	29.605
27	0	Garrett Smithley	JD Motorsports	Chevrolet	29.618
28	61	Chad Finchum	MBM Motorsports	Toyota	29.618
29	01	Stephen Leicht	JD Motorsports	Chevrolet	29.655
30	17	Kyle Weatherman	Rick Ware Racing	Chevrolet	29.694
31	52	David Starr	Jimmy Means Racing	Chevrolet	29.932
32	93	C. J. McLaughlin	RSS Racing	Chevrolet	29.953
33	66	Bobby Dale Earnhardt	MBM Motorsports	Toyota	30.266
34	5	Vinnie Miller	B. J. McLeod Motorsports	Chevrolet	30.476
35	13	Timmy Hill	MBM Motorsports	Toyota	30.545
36	99	Josh Bilicki	B. J. McLeod Motorsports	Toyota	30.549
37	35	Joey Gase	MBM Motorsports	Toyota	30.600
38	11	Justin Haley (R)	Kaulig Racing	Chevrolet	0.000

. – Playoffs driver

== Race ==
=== Summary ===
Tyler Reddick began on pole, but Christopher Bell took the lead on lap 6. Bell dominated in the first half, winning both stages.

When the final stage began, Austin Cindric grabbed the lead and led until Chase Briscoe had a flat right rear tire and made contact with the wall, bringing out a caution on lap 129. Reddick briefly got the lead but lost it to Chastain, who took and kept the lead on lap 144.

On lap 151, Noah Gragson tried to squeeze between Harrison Burton and Jeb Burton. He got tapped by Harrison and wrecked his car after spinning through the grass for his first DNF of 2019. The race was briefly red-flagged.

Chastain continued to lead on the restart, but Reddick hit the inside wall and brought out a late caution. Briscoe was also struggling as his right front tire disintegrated with 25 laps remaining, but NASCAR didn’t throw a caution. This forced Briscoe to ultimately finish 22nd.

Bell regained the lead on the lap 170 restart and he never looked back. He ultimately took the win, leading 101 laps and finishing ahead of Chastain by 5 seconds. Bell also secured a spot in the Championship race at Homestead-Miami Speedway. After the race, Briscoe, Michael Annett, Cindric, and Gragson were below the playoffs cutoff point.

=== Stage Results ===
Stage One Laps: 45

Pos	No	Driver	Team	Manufacturer	Points
1	20	Christopher Bell	Joe Gibbs Racing	Toyota	10
2	2	Tyler Reddick	Richard Childress Racing	Chevrolet	9
3	00	Cole Custer	Stewart-Haas Racing with Biagi-DenBeste	Ford	8
4	23	John Hunter Nemechek (R)	GMS Racing	Chevrolet	7
5	10	Ross Chastain (i)	Kaulig Racing	Chevrolet	0
6	98	Chase Briscoe (R)	Stewart-Haas Racing with Biagi-DenBeste	Ford	5
7	18	Harrison Burton (i)	Joe Gibbs Racing	Toyota	0
8	22	Austin Cindric	Team Penske	Ford	3
9	7	Justin Allgaier	JR Motorsports	Chevrolet	2
10	8	Jeb Burton	JR Motorsports	Chevrolet	1

Stage Two Laps: 45

Pos	No	Driver	Team	Manufacturer	Points
1	20	Christopher Bell	Joe Gibbs Racing	Toyota	10
2	7	Justin Allgaier	JR Motorsports	Chevrolet	9
3	2	Tyler Reddick	Richard Childress Racing	Chevrolet	8
4	23	John Hunter Nemechek (R)	GMS Racing	Chevrolet	7
5	98	Chase Briscoe (R)	Stewart-Haas Racing with Biagi-DenBeste	Ford	6
6	9	Noah Gragson (R)	JR Motorsports	Chevrolet	5
7	22	Austin Cindric	Team Penske	Ford	4
8	00	Cole Custer	Stewart-Haas Racing with Biagi-DenBeste	Ford	3
9	19	Brandon Jones	Joe Gibbs Racing	Toyota	2
10	8	Jeb Burton	JR Motorsports	Chevrolet	1

=== Final Stage Results ===
Stage Three Laps: 110

Pos	Grid	No	Driver	Team	Manufacturer	Laps	Points
1	3	20	Christopher Bell	Joe Gibbs Racing	Toyota	200	60
2	7	10	Ross Chastain (i)	Kaulig Racing	Chevrolet	200	0
3	14	22	Austin Cindric	Team Penske	Ford	200	41
4	9	19	Brandon Jones	Joe Gibbs Racing	Toyota	200	35
5	11	23	John Hunter Nemechek (R)	GMS Racing	Chevrolet	200	46
6	6	7	Justin Allgaier	JR Motorsports	Chevrolet	200	42
7	2	18	Harrison Burton (i)	Joe Gibbs Racing	Toyota	200	0
8	4	00	Cole Custer	Stewart-Haas Racing with Biagi-DenBeste	Ford	200	40
9	8	8	Jeb Burton	JR Motorsports	Chevrolet	200	30
10	21	39	Ryan Sieg	RSS Racing	Chevrolet	200	27
11	19	1	Michael Annett	JR Motorsports	Chevrolet	200	26
12	17	07	Ray Black Jr.	SS-Green Light Racing	Chevrolet	200	25
13	22	08	Gray Gaulding	SS-Green Light Racing	Chevrolet	200	24
14	24	36	Josh Williams (R)	DGM Racing	Chevrolet	200	23
15	28	61	Chad Finchum	MBM Motorsports	Toyota	199	22
16	15	4	B. J. McLeod	JD Motorsports	Chevrolet	199	21
17	27	0	Garrett Smithley	JD Motorsports	Chevrolet	199	20
18	26	78	Matt Mills (R)	B. J. McLeod Motorsports	Chevrolet	199	19
19	29	01	Stephen Leicht	JD Motorsports	Chevrolet	199	18
20	18	74	Bayley Currey (i)	Mike Harmon Racing	Chevrolet	199	0
21	36	99	Josh Bilicki	B. J. McLeod Motorsports	Chevrolet	197	16
22	5	98	Chase Briscoe (R)	Stewart-Haas Racing with Biagi-DenBeste	Ford	197	26
23	16	15	Stefan Parsons	JD Motorsports	Chevrolet	197	14
24	34	5	Vinnie Miller	B. J. McLeod Motorsports	Chevrolet	196	13
25	13	86	Brandon Brown	Brandonbilt Motorsports	Chevrolet	194	12
26	37	35	Joey Gase	MBM Motorsports	Toyota	193	11
27	32	93	C. J. McLaughlin	RSS Racing	Chevrolet	175	10
28	12	51	Jeremy Clements	Jeremy Clements Racing	Chevrolet	162	9
29	1	2	Tyler Reddick	Richard Childress Racing	Chevrolet	160	25
30	10	9	Noah Gragson (R)	JR Motorsports	Chevrolet	150	12
31	20	90	Ronnie Bassett Jr.	DGM Racing	Chevrolet	139	6
32	38	11	Justin Haley (R)	Kaulig Racing	Chevrolet	88	5
33	31	52	David Starr	Jimmy Means Racing	Chevrolet	77	4
34	30	17	Kyle Weatherman	Rick Ware Racing	Chevrolet	48	3
35	35	13	Timmy Hill	MBM Motorsports	Toyota	35	2
36	23	89	Landon Cassill	Shepherd Racing Ventures	Chevrolet	32	1
37	33	66	Bobby Dale Earnhardt	MBM Motorsports	Toyota	17	1
38	25	38	J. J. Yeley	RSS Racing	Chevrolet	3	1

. – Driver advanced to the next round of the playoffs.

. – Playoffs driver

Previous race: 2019 Kansas Lottery 300	NASCAR Xfinity Series; 2019 season	Next race: 2019 Desert Diamond Casino West Valley 200
