= 2019 Kansas Lottery 300 =

Race details
- Race 30 of 33 in the 2019 NASCAR Xfinity Series season
- Date: October 19, 2019
- Location: Kansas Speedway in Kansas City, Kansas
- Course: Permanent racing facility
- Course length: 1.5 miles (2.4 km)
- Distance: 200 laps, 300 mi (482.80 km)

Pole position
Driver	Christopher Bell	Joe Gibbs Racing
- Time: 29.807

Most laps led
Driver	Cole Custer	Stewart-Haas Racing with Biagi-DenBeste Racing
- Laps: 85

Winner
No. 19	Brandon Jones	Joe Gibbs Racing

Television in the United States
- Network: NBC

Radio in the United States
- Radio: MRN

The 2019 Kansas Lottery 300 is a NASCAR Xfinity Series race held on October 19, 2019, at Kansas Speedway in Kansas City, Kansas. Contested over 200 laps on the 1.5 mile (2.4 km) asphalt speedway, it was the 30th race of the 2019 NASCAR Xfinity Series season, fourth race of the Playoffs, and the first race of the Round of 8.

== Background ==
=== Track ===
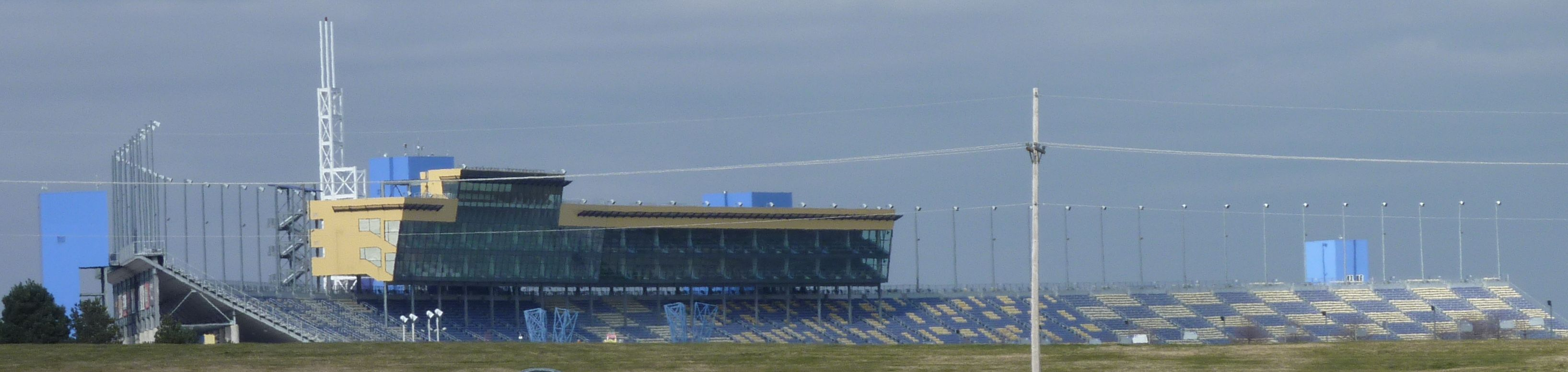
Kansas Speedway, the track where the race was held.

Kansas Speedway is a 1.5-mile (2.4 km) tri-oval race track in Kansas City, Kansas. It was built in 2001 and it currently hosts two annual NASCAR race weekends. The IndyCar Series also held races at the venue until 2011. The speedway is owned and operated by the International Speedway Corporation.

== Entry list ==
No.	Driver	Team	Manufacturer
00	Cole Custer	Stewart-Haas Racing with Biagi-DenBeste Racing	Ford
0	Garrett Smithley	JD Motorsports	Chevrolet
01	Stephen Leicht	JD Motorsports	Chevrolet
1	Michael Annett	JR Motorsports	Chevrolet
2	Tyler Reddick	Richard Childress Racing	Chevrolet
4	B. J. McLeod	JD Motorsports	Chevrolet
5	Matt Mills	B. J. McLeod Motorsports	Chevrolet
07	Ray Black Jr.	SS-Green Light Racing	Chevrolet
7	Justin Allgaier	JR Motorsports	Chevrolet
08	Gray Gaulding (R)	SS-Green Light Racing	Chevrolet
8	Ryan Truex	JR Motorsports	Chevrolet
9	Noah Gragson (R)	JR Motorsports	Chevrolet
10	Ross Chastain (i)	Kaulig Racing	Chevrolet
11	Justin Haley (R)	Kaulig Racing	Chevrolet
13	Timmy Hill	MBM Motorsports	Toyota
15	Tyler Matthews	JD Motorsports	Chevrolet
17	Bayley Currey (i)	Rick Ware Racing	Chevrolet
18	Harrison Burton (i)	Joe Gibbs Racing	Toyota
19	Brandon Jones	Joe Gibbs Racing	Toyota
20	Christopher Bell	Joe Gibbs Racing	Toyota
22	Austin Cindric	Team Penske	Ford
23	John Hunter Nemechek (R)	GMS Racing	Chevrolet
35	Joey Gase	MBM Motorsports	Toyota
36	Josh Williams	DGM Racing	Chevrolet
38	J. J. Yeley	RSS Racing	Chevrolet
39	Ryan Sieg	RSS Racing	Chevrolet
51	Jeremy Clements	Jeremy Clements Racing	Chevrolet
52	David Starr	Jimmy Means Racing	Chevrolet
61	Chad Finchum	MBM Motorsports	Toyota
66	Bobby Dale Earnhardt	MBM Motorsports	Toyota
74	Kyle Weatherman	Mike Harmon Racing	Chevrolet
78	Vinnie Miller	B. J. McLeod Motorsports	Chevrolet
86	Brandon Brown (R)	Brandonbilt Motorsports	Chevrolet
89	Landon Cassill	Shepherd Racing Ventures	Chevrolet
90	Alex Labbé	DGM Racing	Chevrolet
92	Dillon Bassett	DGM Racing	Chevrolet
93	C. J. McLaughlin	RSS Racing	Chevrolet
98	Chase Briscoe (R)	Stewart-Haas Racing with Biagi-DenBeste Racing	Ford
99	Josh Bilicki	B. J. McLeod Motorsports	Toyota

== Practice ==
=== First practice ===
Cole Custer was the fastest in the first practice session with a time of 31.116 seconds and a speed of 173.544 mph (279.292 km/h).

Pos	No.	Driver	Team	Manufacturer	Time	Speed
1	00	Cole Custer	Stewart-Haas Racing with Biagi-DenBeste Racing	Ford	31.116	173.544
2	2	Tyler Reddick	Richard Childress Racing	Chevrolet	31.169	173.249
3	10	Ross Chastain (i)	Kaulig Racing	Chevrolet	31.200	173.077

=== Final practice ===
Tyler Reddick was the fastest in the final practice session with a time of 31.104 seconds and a speed of 173.611 mph (279.400 km/h).

Pos	No.	Driver	Team	Manufacturer	Time	Speed
1	2	Tyler Reddick	Richard Childress Racing	Chevrolet	31.104	173.611
2	20	Christopher Bell	Joe Gibbs Racing	Toyota	31.334	172.337
3	00	Cole Custer	Stewart-Haas Racing with Biagi-DenBeste Racing	Ford	31.346	172.271

== Qualifying ==
Christopher Bell scored the pole for the race with a time of 29.807 seconds and a speed of 181.165 mph (291.557 km/h).

=== Qualifying results ===
Pos	No	Driver	Team	Manufacturer	Time
1	20	Christopher Bell	Joe Gibbs Racing	Toyota	29.807
2	19	Brandon Jones	Joe Gibbs Racing	Toyota	29.920
3	22	Austin Cindric	Team Penske	Ford	29.964
4	2	Tyler Reddick	Richard Childress Racing	Chevrolet	30.115
5	00	Cole Custer	Stewart-Haas Racing with Biagi-DenBeste Racing	Ford	30.116
6	51	Jeremy Clements	Jeremy Clements Racing	Chevrolet	30.194
7	7	Justin Allgaier	JR Motorsports	Chevrolet	30.201
8	8	Ryan Truex	JR Motorsports	Chevrolet	30.231
9	10	Ross Chastain (i)	Kaulig Racing	Chevrolet	30.235
10	9	Noah Gragson (R)	JR Motorsports	Chevrolet	30.265
11	98	Chase Briscoe (R)	Stewart-Haas Racing with Biagi-DenBeste Racing	Ford	30.396
12	11	Justin Haley (R)	Kaulig Racing	Chevrolet	30.462
13	39	Ryan Sieg	RSS Racing	Chevrolet	30.603
14	38	J. J. Yeley	RSS Racing	Chevrolet	30.637
15	23	John Hunter Nemechek (R)	GMS Racing	Chevrolet	30.749
16	18	Harrison Burton (i)	Joe Gibbs Racing	Toyota	30.756
17	90	Alex Labbé	DGM Racing	Chevrolet	30.785
18	86	Brandon Brown (R)	Brandonbilt Motorsports	Chevrolet	30.801
19	08	Gray Gaulding (R)	SS-Green Light Racing	Chevrolet	30.945
20	74	Kyle Weatherman	Mike Harmon Racing	Chevrolet	30.958
21	92	Dillon Bassett	DGM Racing	Chevrolet	31.085
22	17	Bayley Currey (i)	Rick Ware Racing	Chevrolet	31.116
23	07	Ray Black Jr.	SS-Green Light Racing	Chevrolet	31.276
24	35	Joey Gase	MBM Motorsports	Toyota	31.322
25	4	B. J. McLeod	JD Motorsports	Chevrolet	31.346
26	89	Landon Cassill	Shepherd Racing Ventures	Chevrolet	31.516
27	5	Matt Mills	B. J. McLeod Motorsports	Chevrolet	31.587
28	52	David Starr	Jimmy Means Racing	Chevrolet	31.588
29	01	Stephen Leicht	JD Motorsports	Chevrolet	31.617
30	36	Josh Williams	DGM Racing	Chevrolet	31.693
31	99	Josh Bilicki	B. J. McLeod Motorsports	Toyota	31.838
32	15	Tyler Matthews	JD Motorsports	Chevrolet	31.877
33	0	Garrett Smithley	JD Motorsports	Chevrolet	32.137
34	93	C. J. McLaughlin	RSS Racing	Chevrolet	32.321
35	61	Chad Finchum	MBM Motorsports	Toyota	32.387
36	78	Vinnie Miller	B. J. McLeod Motorsports	Chevrolet	32.757
37	66	Bobby Dale Earnhardt	MBM Motorsports	Toyota	35.158
38	1	Michael Annett	JR Motorsports	Chevrolet	0.000
Did not qualify
39	13	Timmy Hill	MBM Motorsports	Toyota	32.747

. – Playoffs driver

== Race ==
=== Summary ===
Christopher Bell started on pole and lead all of Stage 1, also gaining the stage points. Austin Cindric pitted shortly before the end of the stage and did not gain stage points.

On lap 71, Cindric hit Harrison Burton while they were racing each other. Burton then went down on Cindric, but ultimately shot himself into the wall and ended his day. Cindric then had to pit twice during the green flag for tire rub issues. Cole Custer won Stage 2 ahead of Bell and Tyler Reddick.

On lap 151, Justin Haley drove into Custer, who managed to save his car but lost several positions. On lap 164, John Hunter Nemechek spun, bringing out a caution. All the leaders got one set of fresh tires in the pit stops, and everyone except Michael Annett opted to pit.

With 15 to go, Chase Briscoe and Bell were in a tight battle for the lead and they approached Garrett Smithley, who drove slightly up the race track. Briscoe and Bell were unsure where Smithley would go, resulting in them both plowed into him. The restart caused another caution as Joey Gase and Noah Gragson were involved in an accident.

On the restart, Brandon Jones grabbed the lead from Briscoe. Reddick passed Briscoe and made up a lot of ground, but ran out of time. Jones took his first win by holding off Reddick.

Due to Jones taking the victory, none of the playoff drivers locked themselves into the final round of the playoffs after the race. Briscoe, Annett, Gragson, and Cindric exited the race below the cutoff line.

After the race, Custer and Reddick were involved in a physical altercation; Custer was upset at Reddick sliding them up the track during a restart. Reddick was annoyed when Custer placed his hand on his shoulder, and quickly responded by shoving him. Their crews quickly got involved, and Reddick ultimately received a cut over his eye from being thrown to the ground.

=== Stage Results ===
Stage One Laps: 45

Pos	No	Driver	Team	Manufacturer	Points
1	20	Christopher Bell	Joe Gibbs Racing	Toyota	10
2	00	Cole Custer	Stewart-Haas Racing with Biagi-DenBeste	Ford	9
3	9	Noah Gragson (R)	JR Motorsports	Chevrolet	8
4	2	Tyler Reddick	Richard Childress Racing	Chevrolet	7
5	7	Justin Allgaier	JR Motorsports	Chevrolet	6
6	10	Ross Chastain (i)	Kaulig Racing	Chevrolet	0
7	98	Chase Briscoe (R)	Stewart-Haas Racing with Biagi-DenBeste	Ford	4
8	19	Brandon Jones	Joe Gibbs Racing	Toyota	3
9	23	John Hunter Nemechek (R)	GMS Racing	Chevrolet	2
10	1	Michael Annett	JR Motorsports	Chevrolet	1

Stage Two Laps: 45

Pos	No	Driver	Team	Manufacturer	Points
1	00	Cole Custer	Stewart-Haas Racing with Biagi-DenBeste	Ford	10
2	20	Christopher Bell	Joe Gibbs Racing	Toyota	9
3	2	Tyler Reddick	Richard Childress Racing	Chevrolet	8
4	7	Justin Allgaier	JR Motorsports	Chevrolet	7
5	98	Chase Briscoe (R)	Stewart-Haas Racing with Biagi-DenBeste	Ford	6
6	9	Noah Gragson (R)	JR Motorsports	Chevrolet	5
7	1	Michael Annett	JR Motorsports	Chevrolet	4
8	10	Ross Chastain (i)	Kaulig Racing	Chevrolet	0
9	19	Brandon Jones	Joe Gibbs Racing	Toyota	2
10	11	Justin Haley (R)	Kaulig Racing	Chevrolet	1

=== Final Stage Results ===
Stage Three Laps: 110

Pos	Grid	No	Driver	Team	Manufacturer	Laps	Points
1	2	19	Brandon Jones	Joe Gibbs Racing	Toyota	200	45
2	4	2	Tyler Reddick	Richard Childress Racing	Chevrolet	200	50
3	11	98	Chase Briscoe (R)	Stewart-Haas Racing with Biagi-DenBeste	Ford	200	44
4	38	1	Michael Annett	JR Motorsports	Chevrolet	200	38
5	7	7	Justin Allgaier	JR Motorsports	Chevrolet	200	45
6	6	51	Jeremy Clements	Jeremy Clements Racing	Chevrolet	200	31
7	12	11	Justin Haley (R)	Kaulig Racing	Chevrolet	200	31
8	15	23	John Hunter Nemechek (R)	GMS Racing	Chevrolet	200	31
9	13	39	Ryan Sieg	RSS Racing	Chevrolet	200	28
10	9	10	Ross Chastain (i)	Kaulig Racing	Chevrolet	200	0
11	5	00	Cole Custer	Stewart-Haas Racing with Biagi-DenBeste	Ford	200	45
12	1	20	Christopher Bell	Joe Gibbs Racing	Toyota	200	44
13	10	9	Noah Gragson (R)	JR Motorsports	Chevrolet	200	37
14	23	07	Ray Black Jr.	SS-Green Light Racing	Chevrolet	200	23
15	17	90	Alex Labbé	DGM Racing	Chevrolet	199	22
16	21	92	Dillon Bassett	DGM Racing	Chevrolet	199	21
17	19	08	Gray Gaulding (R)	SS-Green Light Racing	Chevrolet	199	20
18	18	86	Brandon Brown (R)	Brandonbilt Motorsports	Chevrolet	197	19
19	25	4	B. J. McLeod	JD Motorsports	Chevrolet	197	18
20	27	5	Matt Mills	B. J. McLeod Motorsports	Chevrolet	197	17
21	30	36	Josh Williams	DGM Racing	Chevrolet	197	16
22	20	74	Kyle Weatherman	Mike Harmon Racing	Chevrolet	196	15
23	28	52	David Starr	Jimmy Means Racing	Chevrolet	196	14
24	34	93	C. J. McLaughlin	RSS Racing	Chevrolet	195	13
25	3	22	Austin Cindric	Team Penske	Ford	194	12
26	35	61	Chad Finchum	MBM Motorsports	Toyota	194	11
27	29	01	Stephen Leicht	JD Motorsports	Chevrolet	194	10
28	32	15	Tyler Matthews	JD Motorsports	Chevrolet	194	9
29	31	99	Josh Bilicki	B. J. McLeod Motorsports	Toyota	194	8
30	36	78	Vinnie Miller	B. J. McLeod Motorsports	Chevrolet	194	7
31	37	66	Bobby Dale Earnhardt	MBM Motorsports	Toyota	192	6
32	24	35	Joey Gase	MBM Motorsports	Toyota	184	5
33	33	0	Garrett Smithley	JD Motorsports	Chevrolet	180	4
34	16	18	Harrison Burton (i)	Joe Gibbs Racing	Toyota	70	0
35	22	17	Bayley Currey (i)	Rick Ware Racing	Chevrolet	49	0
36	26	89	Landon Cassill	Shepherd Racing Ventures	Chevrolet	28	1
37	14	38	J. J. Yeley	RSS Racing	Chevrolet	13	1
38	8	8	Ryan Truex	JR Motorsports	Chevrolet	4	1

. – Driver advanced to the next round of the playoffs.

. – Playoffs driver

Previous race: 2019 Use Your Melon Drive Sober 200	NASCAR Xfinity Series; 2019 season	Next race: 2019 O'Reilly Auto Parts 300
