= 2019 Desert Diamond Casino West Valley 200 =

Race details
- Race 32 of 33 in the 2019 NASCAR Xfinity Series season
- Date: November 9, 2019
- Location: ISM Raceway in Avondale, Arizona
- Course: Permanent racing facility
- Course length: 1 miles (1.6 km)
- Distance: 200 laps, 200 mi (320 km)

Pole position
Driver	Christopher Bell	Joe Gibbs Racing
- Time: 27.180

Most laps led
Driver	Christopher Bell	Joe Gibbs Racing
- Laps: 92

Winner
No. 7	Justin Allgaier	JR Motorsports

Television in the United States
- Network: NBCSN

Radio in the United States
- Radio: MRN

The 2019 Desert Diamond Casino West Valley 200 is a NASCAR Xfinity Series race held on November 9, 2019, at ISM Raceway in Avondale, Arizona. Contested over 200 laps on the one-mile (1.6 km) oval, it was the 32nd race of the 2019 NASCAR Xfinity Series season, sixth race of the Playoffs, and the final race of the Round of 8.

== Background ==
=== Track ===
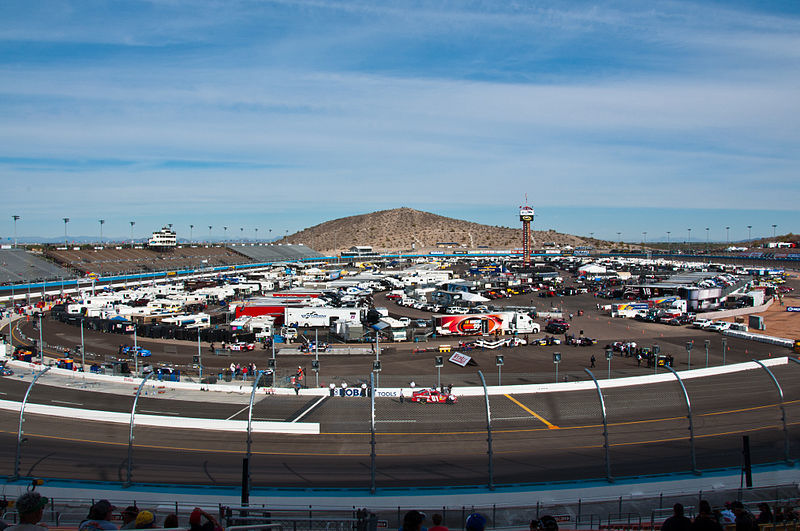
ISM Raceway, the track where the race was held.

ISM Raceway is a 1-mile, low-banked tri-oval race track located in Avondale, Arizona, near Phoenix. The motorsport track opened in 1964 and currently hosts two NASCAR race weekends annually. ISM Raceway has also hosted the CART, IndyCar Series, USAC and the WeatherTech SportsCar Championship. The raceway is currently owned and operated by International Speedway Corporation.

== Entry list ==
No.	Driver	Team	Manufacturer
00	Cole Custer	Stewart-Haas Racing with Biagi-DenBeste Racing	Ford
0	Garrett Smithley	JD Motorsports	Chevrolet
01	Stephen Leicht	JD Motorsports	Chevrolet
1	Michael Annett	JR Motorsports	Chevrolet
2	Tyler Reddick	Richard Childress Racing	Chevrolet
4	Ryan Vargas	JD Motorsports	Chevrolet
5	Vinnie Miller	B. J. McLeod Motorsports	Chevrolet
07	Ray Black Jr.	SS-Green Light Racing	Chevrolet
7	Justin Allgaier	JR Motorsports	Chevrolet
08	Gray Gaulding (R)	SS-Green Light Racing	Chevrolet
8	Zane Smith	JR Motorsports	Chevrolet
9	Noah Gragson (R)	JR Motorsports	Chevrolet
11	Justin Haley (R)	Kaulig Racing	Chevrolet
13	Chad Finchum	MBM Motorsports	Toyota
15	Tyler Matthews	JD Motorsports	Chevrolet
17	Joe Nemechek (i)	Rick Ware Racing	Chevrolet
18	Riley Herbst (i)	Joe Gibbs Racing	Toyota
19	Brandon Jones	Joe Gibbs Racing	Toyota
20	Christopher Bell	Joe Gibbs Racing	Toyota
22	Austin Cindric	Team Penske	Ford
23	John Hunter Nemechek (R)	GMS Racing	Chevrolet
35	Joey Gase	MBM Motorsports	Toyota
36	Josh Williams	DGM Racing	Chevrolet
38	J. J. Yeley	RSS Racing	Chevrolet
39	Ryan Sieg	RSS Racing	Chevrolet
51	Jeremy Clements	Jeremy Clements Racing	Chevrolet
52	David Starr	Jimmy Means Racing	Chevrolet
61	Tommy Joe Martins	MBM Motorsports	Toyota
66	Bobby Dale Earnhardt	MBM Motorsports	Toyota
74	Mike Harmon	Mike Harmon Racing	Chevrolet
78	Matt Mills	B. J. McLeod Motorsports	Chevrolet
86	Brandon Brown (R)	Brandonbilt Motorsports	Chevrolet
89	Landon Cassill	Shepherd Racing Ventures	Chevrolet
90	Ronnie Bassett Jr.	DGM Racing	Chevrolet
92	Dexter Bean	DGM Racing	Chevrolet
93	Bayley Currey (i)	RSS Racing	Chevrolet
98	Chase Briscoe (R)	Stewart-Haas Racing with Biagi-DenBeste Racing	Ford
99	Josh Bilicki	B. J. McLeod Motorsports	Toyota

== Practice ==
=== First practice ===
Christopher Bell was the fastest in the first practice session with a time of 27.736 seconds and a speed of 129.795 mph (208.885 km/h).

Pos	No.	Driver	Team	Manufacturer	Time	Speed
1	20	Christopher Bell	Joe Gibbs Racing	Toyota	27.736	129.795
2	00	Cole Custer	Stewart-Haas Racing with Biagi-DenBeste Racing	Ford	27.753	129.716
3	2	Tyler Reddick	Richard Childress Racing	Chevrolet	27.754	129.711

=== Final practice ===
Christopher Bell was the fastest in the final practice session with a time of 27.661 seconds and a speed of 130.147 mph (209.451 km/h).

Pos	No.	Driver	Team	Manufacturer	Time	Speed
1	20	Christopher Bell	Joe Gibbs Racing	Toyota	27.661	130.147
2	2	Tyler Reddick	Richard Childress Racing	Chevrolet	27.690	130.011
3	00	Cole Custer	Stewart-Haas Racing with Biagi-DenBeste Racing	Ford	27.774	129.618

== Qualifying ==
Christopher Bell scored the pole for the race with a time of 27.180 seconds and a speed of 132.450 mph (213.158 km/h).

=== Qualifying results ===
Pos	No	Driver	Team	Manufacturer	Time
1	20	Christopher Bell	Joe Gibbs Racing	Toyota	27.180
2	00	Cole Custer	Stewart-Haas Racing with Biagi-DenBeste Racing	Ford	27.252
3	98	Chase Briscoe (R)	Stewart-Haas Racing with Biagi-DenBeste Racing	Ford	27.317
4	2	Tyler Reddick	Richard Childress Racing	Chevrolet	27.328
5	7	Justin Allgaier	JR Motorsports	Chevrolet	27.347
6	8	Zane Smith	JR Motorsports	Chevrolet	27.447
7	22	Austin Cindric	Team Penske	Ford	27.478
8	19	Brandon Jones	Joe Gibbs Racing	Toyota	27.531
9	1	Michael Annett	JR Motorsports	Chevrolet	27.554
10	51	Jeremy Clements	Jeremy Clements Racing	Chevrolet	27.595
11	18	Riley Herbst (i)	Joe Gibbs Racing	Toyota	27.605
12	9	Noah Gragson (R)	JR Motorsports	Chevrolet	27.612
13	23	John Hunter Nemechek (R)	GMS Racing	Chevrolet	27.703
14	11	Justin Haley (R)	Kaulig Racing	Chevrolet	27.721
15	08	Gray Gaulding (R)	SS-Green Light Racing	Chevrolet	27.731
16	39	Ryan Sieg	RSS Racing	Chevrolet	27.738
17	86	Brandon Brown (R)	Brandonbilt Motorsports	Chevrolet	27.940
18	89	Landon Cassill	Shepherd Racing Ventures	Chevrolet	27.957
19	07	Ray Black Jr.	SS-Green Light Racing	Chevrolet	27.998
20	38	J. J. Yeley	RSS Racing	Chevrolet	28.123
21	78	Matt Mills	B. J. McLeod Motorsports	Chevrolet	28.131
22	35	Joey Gase	MBM Motorsports	Toyota	28.171
23	36	Josh Williams	DGM Racing	Chevrolet	28.186
24	90	Ronnie Bassett Jr.	DGM Racing	Chevrolet	28.215
25	01	Stephen Leicht	JD Motorsports	Chevrolet	28.284
26	93	Bayley Currey (i)	RSS Racing	Chevrolet	28.336
27	61	Tommy Joe Martins	MBM Motorsports	Toyota	28.337
28	92	Dexter Bean	DGM Racing	Chevrolet	28.346
29	4	Ryan Vargas	JD Motorsports	Chevrolet	28.421
30	17	Joe Nemechek (i)	Rick Ware Racing	Chevrolet	28.488
31	52	David Starr	Jimmy Means Racing	Chevrolet	28.508
32	99	Josh Bilicki	B. J. McLeod Motorsports	Toyota	28.520
33	15	Tyler Matthews	JD Motorsports	Chevrolet	28.646
34	13	Chad Finchum	MBM Motorsports	Toyota	28.731
35	0	Garrett Smithley	JD Motorsports	Chevrolet	28.758
36	5	Vinnie Miller	B. J. McLeod Motorsports	Chevrolet	28.877
37	74	Mike Harmon	Mike Harmon Racing	Chevrolet	29.046
38	66	Bobby Dale Earnhardt	MBM Motorsports	Toyota	29.203

. – Playoffs driver

== Race ==
=== Summary ===
Christopher Bell started on pole and led for the first 48 laps. The first caution occurred when Michael Annett and Riley Herbst tangled. Bell lost the lead to Tyler Reddick for one lap, but quickly took it back and won Stage 1. Bell and Austin Cindric were tagged for speeding on pit road. Cole Custer and Justin Allgaier exchanged the lead afterwards. Bell also won Stage 2 after briefly taking the lead.

Bell lost his chance of winning the race after a spin on lap 117 caused him to go one lap down. However, Bell was already locked into the finale from his win at the previous week's race. Chase Briscoe took the lead on the restart, but lost it to Allgaier as Briscoe only took fuel on the last caution (he had hoped for another caution to occur). Allgaier held onto the lead, holding off a charging Custer to take the victory and advance to the final 4.

Reddick and Custer also made the championship 4 on points, eliminating Cindric, Briscoe, Annett, and Noah Gragson.

=== Stage Results ===
Stage One Laps: 60

Pos	No	Driver	Team	Manufacturer	Points
1	20	Christopher Bell	Joe Gibbs Racing	Toyota	10
2	7	Justin Allgaier	JR Motorsports	Chevrolet	9
3	00	Cole Custer	Stewart-Haas Racing with Biagi-DenBeste	Ford	8
4	2	Tyler Reddick	Richard Childress Racing	Chevrolet	7
5	98	Chase Briscoe (R)	Stewart-Haas Racing with Biagi-DenBeste	Ford	6
6	1	Michael Annett	JR Motorsports	Chevrolet	5
7	19	Brandon Jones	Joe Gibbs Racing	Toyota	4
8	8	Zane Smith	JR Motorsports	Chevrolet	3
9	23	John Hunter Nemechek (R)	GMS Racing	Chevrolet	2
10	22	Austin Cindric	Team Penske	Ford	1

Stage Two Laps: 60

Pos	No	Driver	Team	Manufacturer	Points
1	20	Christopher Bell	Joe Gibbs Racing	Toyota	10
2	7	Justin Allgaier	JR Motorsports	Chevrolet	9
3	00	Cole Custer	Stewart-Haas Racing with Biagi-DenBeste	Ford	8
4	2	Tyler Reddick	Richard Childress Racing	Chevrolet	7
5	1	Michael Annett	JR Motorsports	Chevrolet	6
6	98	Chase Briscoe (R)	Stewart-Haas Racing with Biagi-DenBeste	Ford	5
7	22	Austin Cindric	Team Penske	Ford	4
8	23	John Hunter Nemechek (R)	GMS Racing	Chevrolet	3
9	9	Noah Gragson (R)	JR Motorsports	Chevrolet	2
10	8	Zane Smith	JR Motorsports	Chevrolet	1

=== Final Stage Results ===
Stage Three Laps: 80

Pos	Grid	No	Driver	Team	Manufacturer	Laps	Points
1	5	7	Justin Allgaier	JR Motorsports	Chevrolet	200	58
2	2	00	Cole Custer	Stewart-Haas Racing with Biagi-DenBeste	Ford	200	51
3	4	2	Tyler Reddick	Richard Childress Racing	Chevrolet	200	48
4	13	23	John Hunter Nemechek (R)	GMS Racing	Chevrolet	200	38
5	6	8	Zane Smith	JR Motorsports	Chevrolet	200	36
6	7	22	Austin Cindric	Team Penske	Ford	200	36
7	14	11	Justin Haley (R)	Kaulig Racing	Chevrolet	200	30
8	3	98	Chase Briscoe (R)	Stewart-Haas Racing with Biagi-DenBeste	Ford	200	40
9	9	1	Michael Annett	JR Motorsports	Chevrolet	200	39
10	12	9	Noah Gragson (R)	JR Motorsports	Chevrolet	200	29
11	8	19	Brandon Jones	Joe Gibbs Racing	Toyota	199	30
12	15	08	Gray Gaulding (R)	SS-Green Light Racing	Chevrolet	199	25
13	16	39	Ryan Sieg	RSS Racing	Chevrolet	199	24
14	19	07	Ray Black Jr.	SS-Green Light Racing	Chevrolet	199	23
15	23	36	Josh Williams	DGM Racing	Chevrolet	199	22
16	1	20	Christopher Bell	Joe Gibbs Racing	Toyota	199	41
17	27	61	Tommy Joe Martins	MBM Motorsports	Toyota	199	20
18	10	51	Jeremy Clements	Jeremy Clements Racing	Chevrolet	198	19
19	21	78	Matt Mills	B. J. McLeod Motorsports	Chevrolet	198	18
20	17	86	Brandon Brown (R)	Brandonbilt Motorsports	Chevrolet	198	17
21	25	01	Stephen Leicht	JD Motorsports	Chevrolet	198	16
22	33	15	Tyler Matthews	JD Motorsports	Chevrolet	197	15
23	32	99	Josh Bilicki	B. J. McLeod Motorsports	Toyota	197	14
24	22	35	Joey Gase	MBM Motorsports	Toyota	196	13
25	31	52	David Starr	Jimmy Means Racing	Chevrolet	196	12
26	29	4	Ryan Vargas	JD Motorsports	Chevrolet	195	11
27	35	0	Garrett Smithley	JD Motorsports	Chevrolet	195	10
28	38	66	Bobby Dale Earnhardt	MBM Motorsports	Toyota	193	9
29	37	74	Mike Harmon	Mike Harmon Racing	Chevrolet	193	8
30	11	18	Riley Herbst (i)	Joe Gibbs Racing	Toyota	163	0
31	36	5	Vinnie Miller	B. J. McLeod Motorsports	Chevrolet	58	6
32	34	13	Chad Finchum	MBM Motorsports	Toyota	58	5
33	24	90	Ronnie Bassett Jr.	DGM Racing	Chevrolet	55	4
34	30	17	Joe Nemechek (i)	Rick Ware Racing	Chevrolet	55	0
35	28	92	Dexter Bean	DGM Racing	Chevrolet	39	2
36	26	93	Bayley Currey (i)	RSS Racing	Chevrolet	34	0
37	20	38	J. J. Yeley	RSS Racing	Chevrolet	32	1
38	18	89	Landon Cassill	Shepherd Racing Ventures	Chevrolet	27	1

. – Driver advanced to the Championship 4.

. – Driver was eliminated from the playoffs.

Previous race: 2019 O'Reilly Auto Parts 300	NASCAR Xfinity Series; 2019 season	Next race: 2019 Ford EcoBoost 300
