= Shawn Szep =

American racing driver (born 1971)

- Born: June 1, 1971 (age 55); Marysville, Ohio, U.S.
- Achievements: 2016 ARCA Truck Series champion

ARCA Menards Series career
- 1 race run over 1 year
- Best finish: 128th (2015)
- First race: 2015 Menards 200 Presented by Federated Car Care (Toledo)
Wins	Top tens	Poles
0	0	0
- Statistics up to date as of April 22, 2025.

Shawn Szep (born June 1, 1971) is an American former professional stock car racing driver. He competed in the ARCA Racing Series and ARCA Truck Series. He won the 2016 ARCA Truck Series championship.

== Racing career ==
Szep began racing at the age of 11, racing go-karts and motocross from 1982 to 2001. Szep raced legends cars starting in 2001, scoring multiple class and heat race wins. He began racing in the NASCAR Whelen All-American Modified Series in 2008. Szep started racing in the ARCA Lincoln Welders Truck Series in 2009, debuting at Toledo Speedway. He scored a top five at Iowa Speedway in his third start. He returned in 2011, running full time and finishing sixth in the final points standings. He would improve to fifth in the standings in 2012, then finished fourth in points in 2013. He competed part-time in 2014, but returned full-time in 2015, scoring his first career win at Painesville Speedway and winning two more by season's end. He would also make his ARCA Racing Series debut at Toledo Speedway for Finney Racing Enterprises, finishing 27th after falling out with suspension problems after five laps. He competed in the final season of the ARCA Truck Series, winning seven of ten races and the championship. He ran in the Coyote Racing Series in 2017, winning three races. Szep competed in the CRA JEGS All-Stars Tour in 2018 and 2019, also competing in the CRA Vore's Welding Late Model Sportsman Series Powered by JEGS in 2019. He ran all four races in the 2021 Ohio 300 Series.

== Motorsport career results ==
=== ARCA Racing Series ===
(key) (Bold – Pole position awarded by qualifying time. Italics – Pole position earned by points standings or practice time. * – Most laps led. ** – All laps led.)

ARCA Racing Series results
Year	Team	No.	Make	1	2	3	4	5	6	7	8	9	10	11	12	13	14	15	16	17	18	19	20	ARSC	Pts	Ref
2015	Finney Racing Enterprises	80	Chevy	DAY	MOB	NSH	SLM	TAL	TOL; 27	NJE	POC	MCH	CHI	WIN	IOW	IRP	POC	BLN	ISF	DSF	SLM	KEN	KAN	128th	95	
