= 2024 SciAps 200 =

16th race of the 2024 NASCAR Xfinity Series

Race details
- Race 16 of 33 of the 2024 NASCAR Xfinity Series
- Date: June 22, 2024
- Official name: 30th Annual SciAps 200
- Location: New Hampshire Motor Speedway in Loudon, New Hampshire
- Course: Permanent racing facility
- Course length: 1.058 miles (1.703 km)
- Distance: 203 laps,
- Scheduled distance: 200 laps, 211 mi (340 km)
- Average speed: 82.951 miles per hour (133.497 km/h)

Pole position
Driver	Cole Custer	Stewart–Haas Racing
- Grid positions set by competition-based formula

Most laps led
Driver	Cole Custer	Stewart-Haas Racing
- Laps: 114

Winner
No. 20	Christopher Bell	Joe Gibbs Racing

Television in the United States
- Network: USA
- Announcers: Rick Allen, Jeff Burton, and Steve Letarte

Radio in the United States
- Radio: PRN

The 2024 SciAps 200 was the 16th stock car race of the 2024 NASCAR Xfinity Series, and the 30th iteration of the event. The race was held on Saturday, June 22, 2024, at New Hampshire Motor Speedway in Loudon, New Hampshire, a 1.058 miles (1.703 km) permanent asphalt oval shaped racetrack. The race was originally scheduled to be contested over 200 laps, but was increased to 203 laps due to a NASCAR overtime finish. In a wild finish, Christopher Bell, driving for Joe Gibbs Racing, would take the lead from the dominating Cole Custer on the final restart, and held off his teammate Sheldon Creed on the final lap to earn his 18th career NASCAR Xfinity Series win, and his first of the season. Custer had put on a dominating performance, leading a race-high 114 laps before falling back to third on the final lap.

This was the final Xfinity Series race at New Hampshire Motor Speedway, as the track lost its race in 2025.

== Report ==
=== Background ===
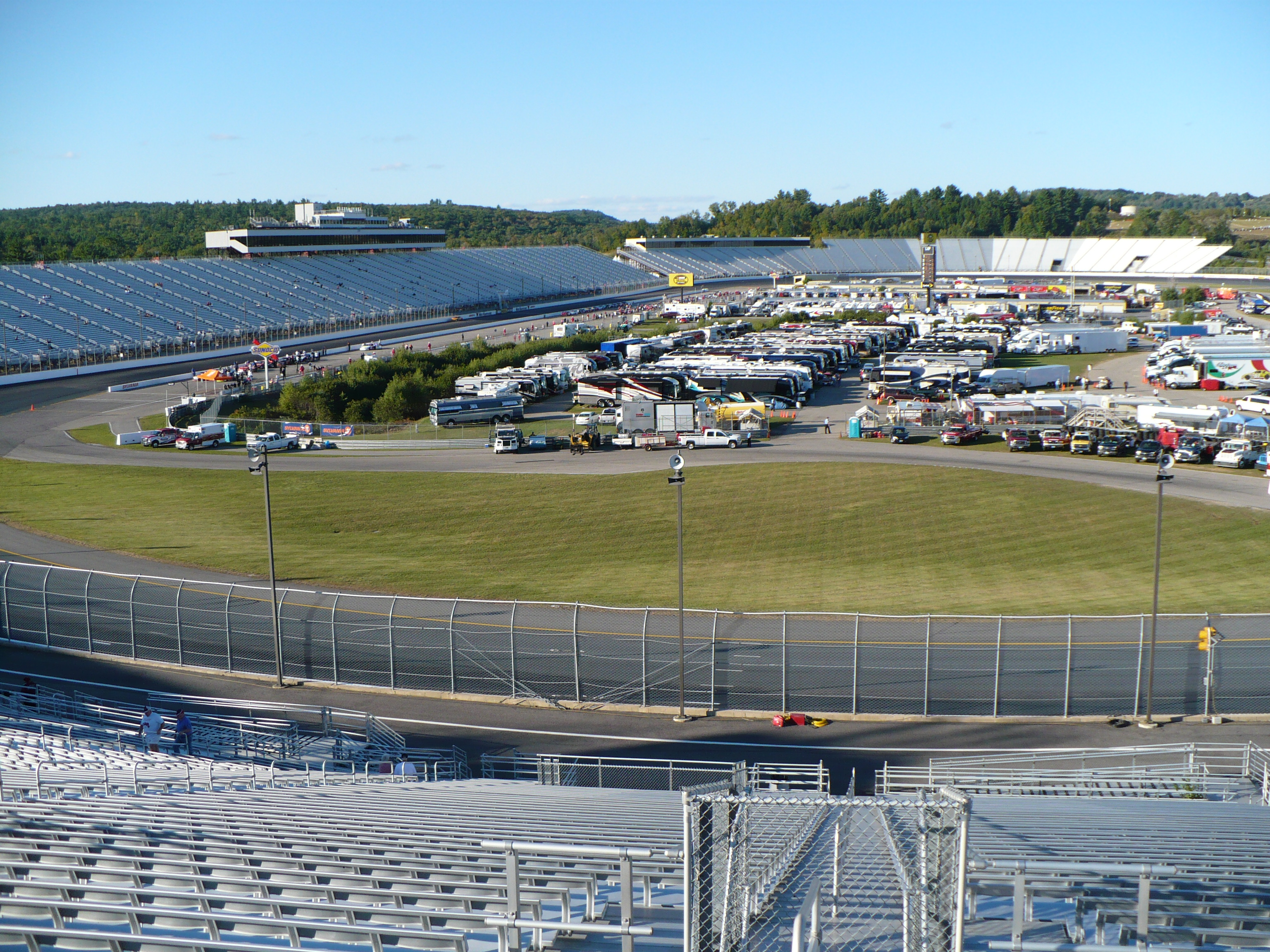
New Hampshire Motor Speedway, the circuit where the race will be held.

New Hampshire Motor Speedway is a 1.058-mile (1.703 km) oval speedway located in Loudon, New Hampshire, which America, the Loudon Classic. Nicknamed "The Magic Mile", the speedway is often converted into a 1.6-mile (2.6 km) road has hosted NASCAR racing annually since the early 1990s, as well as the longest-running motorcycle race in North course, which includes much of the oval.

The track was originally the site of Bryar Motorsports Park before being purchased and redeveloped by Bob Bahre. The track is currently one of eight major NASCAR tracks owned and operated by Speedway Motorsports.

==== Entry list ====
- (R) denotes rookie driver.
- (i) denotes driver who is ineligible for series driver points.

#	Driver	Team	Make
00	Cole Custer	Stewart–Haas Racing	Ford
1	Sam Mayer	JR Motorsports	Chevrolet
2	Jesse Love (R)	Richard Childress Racing	Chevrolet
4	Garrett Smithley	JD Motorsports	Chevrolet
5	Anthony Alfredo	Our Motorsports	Chevrolet
6	Armani Williams	MBM Motorsports	Ford
07	Patrick Emerling	SS-Green Light Racing	Chevrolet
7	Justin Allgaier	JR Motorsports	Chevrolet
8	Sammy Smith	JR Motorsports	Chevrolet
9	Brandon Jones	JR Motorsports	Chevrolet
11	Josh Williams	Kaulig Racing	Chevrolet
14	Mason Massey (i)	SS-Green Light Racing	Chevrolet
15	Hailie Deegan (R)	AM Racing	Ford
16	A. J. Allmendinger	Kaulig Racing	Chevrolet
17	Alex Bowman (i)	Hendrick Motorsports	Chevrolet
18	Sheldon Creed	Joe Gibbs Racing	Toyota
19	Justin Bonsignore	Joe Gibbs Racing	Toyota
20	Christopher Bell (i)	Joe Gibbs Racing	Toyota
21	Austin Hill	Richard Childress Racing	Chevrolet
26	Corey Heim (i)	Sam Hunt Racing	Toyota
27	Jeb Burton	Jordan Anderson Racing	Chevrolet
28	Kyle Sieg	RSS Racing	Ford
29	Blaine Perkins	RSS Racing	Ford
31	Parker Retzlaff	Jordan Anderson Racing	Chevrolet
35	Glen Reen	Joey Gase Motorsports	Chevrolet
38	Matt DiBenedetto	RSS Racing	Ford
39	Ryan Sieg	RSS Racing	Ford
42	Leland Honeyman (R)	Young's Motorsports	Chevrolet
43	Ryan Ellis	Alpha Prime Racing	Chevrolet
44	Brennan Poole	Alpha Prime Racing	Chevrolet
48	Parker Kligerman	Big Machine Racing	Chevrolet
51	Jeremy Clements	Jeremy Clements Racing	Chevrolet
74	Jade Buford	Mike Harmon Racing	Chevrolet
81	Chandler Smith	Joe Gibbs Racing	Toyota
88	Carson Kvapil	JR Motorsports	Chevrolet
91	Kyle Weatherman	DGM Racing	Chevrolet
92	Nathan Byrd	DGM Racing	Chevrolet
97	Shane van Gisbergen (R)	Kaulig Racing	Chevrolet
98	Riley Herbst	Stewart–Haas Racing	Ford
Official entry list

== Starting lineup ==
Practice and qualifying were both scheduled to be held on Friday, June 21, at 4:05 PM and 4:35 PM EST. Since New Hampshire Motor Speedway is a mile oval, the qualifying system used is a single-car, one-lap based system. Drivers will be on track by themselves and will have one lap to post a qualifying time, and whoever sets the fastest time in that session will win the pole.

Practice and qualifying were both cancelled due to inclement weather. The starting lineup would be determined per the NASCAR rulebook. As a result, Cole Custer, driving for Stewart–Haas Racing, would start on the pole.

Jade Buford was the only driver who failed to qualify.

=== Starting lineup ===
Pos.	#	Driver	Team	Make
1	00	Cole Custer	Stewart–Haas Racing	Ford
2	81	Chandler Smith	Joe Gibbs Racing	Toyota
3	1	Sam Mayer	JR Motorsports	Chevrolet
4	98	Riley Herbst	Stewart–Haas Racing	Ford
5	18	Sheldon Creed	Joe Gibbs Racing	Toyota
6	8	Sammy Smith	JR Motorsports	Chevrolet
7	26	Corey Heim (i)	Sam Hunt Racing	Toyota
8	48	Parker Kligerman	Big Machine Racing	Chevrolet
9	39	Ryan Sieg	RSS Racing	Ford
10	38	Matt DiBenedetto	RSS Racing	Ford
11	5	Anthony Alfredo	Our Motorsports	Chevrolet
12	7	Justin Allgaier	JR Motorsports	Chevrolet
13	21	Austin Hill	Richard Childress Racing	Chevrolet
14	42	Leland Honeyman (R)	Young's Motorsports	Chevrolet
15	2	Jesse Love (R)	Richard Childress Racing	Chevrolet
16	43	Ryan Ellis	Alpha Prime Racing	Chevrolet
17	11	Josh Williams	Kaulig Racing	Chevrolet
18	51	Jeremy Clements	Jeremy Clements Racing	Chevrolet
19	28	Kyle Sieg	RSS Racing	Ford
20	27	Jeb Burton	Jordan Anderson Racing	Chevrolet
21	44	Brennan Poole	Alpha Prime Racing	Chevrolet
22	16	A. J. Allmendinger	Kaulig Racing	Chevrolet
23	20	Christopher Bell (i)	Joe Gibbs Racing	Toyota
24	31	Parker Retzlaff	Jordan Anderson Racing	Chevrolet
25	19	Justin Bonsignore	Joe Gibbs Racing	Toyota
26	92	Nathan Byrd	DGM Racing	Chevrolet
27	07	Patrick Emerling	SS-Green Light Racing	Chevrolet
28	97	Shane van Gisbergen (R)	Kaulig Racing	Chevrolet
29	9	Brandon Jones	JR Motorsports	Chevrolet
30	15	Hailie Deegan (R)	AM Racing	Ford
31	14	Mason Massey (i)	SS-Green Light Racing	Chevrolet
32	91	Kyle Weatherman	DGM Racing	Chevrolet
33	29	Blaine Perkins	RSS Racing	Ford
Qualified by owner's points
34	4	Garrett Smithley	JD Motorsports	Chevrolet
35	35	Glen Reen	Joey Gase Motorsports	Chevrolet
36	6	Armani Williams	MBM Motorsports	Ford
37	17	Alex Bowman (i)	Hendrick Motorsports	Chevrolet
38	88	Carson Kvapil	JR Motorsports	Chevrolet
Failed to qualify
39	74	Jade Buford	Mike Harmon Racing	Chevrolet
Official starting lineup

== Race results ==
Stage 1 Laps: 45

Pos.	#	Driver	Team	Make	Pts
1	1	Sam Mayer	JR Motorsports	Chevrolet	10
2	8	Sammy Smith	JR Motorsports	Chevrolet	9
3	98	Riley Herbst	Stewart–Haas Racing	Ford	8
4	16	A. J. Allmendinger	Kaulig Racing	Chevrolet	7
5	7	Justin Allgaier	JR Motorsports	Chevrolet	6
6	17	Alex Bowman (i)	Hendrick Motorsports	Chevrolet	0
7	88	Carson Kvapil	JR Motorsports	Chevrolet	4
8	39	Ryan Sieg	RSS Racing	Ford	3
9	27	Jeb Burton	Jordan Anderson Racing	Chevrolet	2
10	19	Justin Bonsignore	Joe Gibbs Racing	Toyota	1

Stage 2 Laps: 45

Pos.	#	Driver	Team	Make	Pts
1	20	Christopher Bell (i)	Joe Gibbs Racing	Toyota	0
2	19	Justin Bonsignore	Joe Gibbs Racing	Chevrolet	9
3	00	Cole Custer	Stewart–Haas Racing	Ford	8
4	18	Sheldon Creed	Joe Gibbs Racing	Toyota	7
5	81	Chandler Smith	Joe Gibbs Racing	Toyota	6
6	7	Justin Allgaier	JR Motorsports	Chevrolet	5
7	26	Corey Heim (i)	Sam Hunt Racing	Toyota	0
8	9	Brandon Jones	JR Motorsports	Chevrolet	3
9	21	Austin Hill	Richard Childress Racing	Chevrolet	2
10	48	Parker Kligerman	Big Machine Racing	Chevrolet	1

Stage 3 Laps: 116

Pos.	St.	#	Driver	Team	Make	Laps	Led	Status	Pts
1	23	20	Christopher Bell (i)	Joe Gibbs Racing	Toyota	203	43	Running	0
2	5	18	Sheldon Creed	Joe Gibbs Racing	Toyota	203	1	Running	42
3	1	00	Cole Custer	Stewart–Haas Racing	Ford	203	114	Running	42
4	12	7	Justin Allgaier	JR Motorsports	Chevrolet	203	0	Running	44
5	38	88	Carson Kvapil	JR Motorsports	Chevrolet	203	24	Running	36
6	9	39	Ryan Sieg	RSS Racing	Ford	203	0	Running	34
7	8	48	Parker Kligerman	Big Machine Racing	Chevrolet	203	0	Running	31
8	4	98	Riley Herbst	Stewart–Haas Racing	Ford	203	0	Running	37
9	37	17	Alex Bowman (i)	Hendrick Motorsports	Chevrolet	203	0	Running	0
10	7	26	Corey Heim (i)	Sam Hunt Racing	Toyota	203	0	Running	0
11	22	16	A. J. Allmendinger	Kaulig Racing	Chevrolet	203	0	Running	33
12	6	8	Sammy Smith	JR Motorsports	Chevrolet	203	3	Running	34
13	15	2	Jesse Love (R)	Richard Childress Racing	Chevrolet	203	3	Running	24
14	29	9	Brandon Jones	JR Motorsports	Chevrolet	203	0	Running	26
15	2	81	Chandler Smith	Joe Gibbs Racing	Toyota	203	1	Running	28
16	21	44	Brennan Poole	Alpha Prime Racing	Chevrolet	203	0	Running	21
17	20	27	Jeb Burton	Jordan Anderson Racing	Chevrolet	203	0	Running	22
18	28	97	Shane van Gisbergen (R)	Kaulig Racing	Chevrolet	203	0	Running	19
19	3	1	Sam Mayer	JR Motorsports	Chevrolet	203	9	Running	28
20	11	5	Anthony Alfredo	Our Motorsports	Chevrolet	203	0	Running	17
21	18	51	Jeremy Clements	Jeremy Clements Racing	Chevrolet	203	0	Running	16
22	25	19	Justin Bonsignore	Joe Gibbs Racing	Toyota	203	3	Running	25
23	17	11	Josh Williams	Kaulig Racing	Chevrolet	203	0	Running	14
24	13	21	Austin Hill	Richard Childress Racing	Chevrolet	203	2	Running	15
25	32	91	Kyle Weatherman	DGM Racing	Chevrolet	203	0	Running	12
26	24	31	Parker Retzlaff	Jordan Anderson Racing	Chevrolet	203	0	Running	11
27	33	29	Blaine Perkins	RSS Racing	Ford	203	0	Running	10
28	35	35	Glen Reen	Joey Gase Motorsports	Chevrolet	203	0	Running	9
29	34	4	Garrett Smithley	JD Motorsports	Chevrolet	202	0	Running	8
30	31	14	Mason Massey	SS-Green Light Racing	Chevrolet	202	0	Running	0
31	19	28	Kyle Sieg	RSS Racing	Ford	201	0	Running	6
32	30	15	Hailie Deegan (R)	AM Racing	Ford	201	0	Running	5
33	36	6	Armani Williams	MBM Motorsports	Ford	198	0	Running	4
34	27	07	Patrick Emerling	SS-Green Light Racing	Chevrolet	197	0	Running	3
35	16	43	Ryan Ellis	Alpha Prime Racing	Chevrolet	196	0	DVP	2
36	26	92	Nathan Byrd	DGM Racing	Chevrolet	185	0	Crash	1
37	14	42	Leland Honeyman (R)	Young's Motorsports	Chevrolet	95	0	Crash	1
38	10	38	Matt DiBenedetto	RSS Racing	Ford	203	0	DSQ	0
Official race results

== Standings after the race ==
Drivers' Championship standings

	Pos	Driver	Points
	1	Cole Custer	589
	2	Chandler Smith	574 (-15)
1	3	Justin Allgaier	547 (–42)
1	4	Austin Hill	521 (–68)
1	5	Sheldon Creed	484 (–105)
1	6	Riley Herbst	478 (–111)
2	7	Jesse Love	466 (–123)
	8	A. J. Allmendinger	443 (–146)
	9	Parker Kligerman	436 (–153)
	10	Sam Mayer	424 (–165)
	11	Sammy Smith	415 (–174)
1	12	Ryan Sieg	384 (–205)
Official driver's standings

Manufacturers' Championship standings

Pos	Manufacturer	Points
1	Chevrolet	563
2	Toyota	534 (-29)
3	Ford	472 (–91)

- Note: Only the first 12 positions are included for the driver standings.

Previous race: 2024 Hy-Vee PERKS 250	NASCAR Xfinity Series; 2024 season	Next race: 2024 Tennessee Lottery 250
