= ARCA Lincoln Welders Truck Series =

Racing series

- Sport: Auto racing
- Founded: 1999
- Ceased: 2016
- Countries: United States; Canada
- Last champion(s): Shawn Szep

The ARCA Truck Series was a pickup truck racing series which ran on numerous short tracks throughout the American Midwest, running in Indiana, Ohio, Pennsylvania, Kentucky and Michigan. Sanctioned by the Automobile Racing Club of America, it raced mid-size trucks with V6 and V8 engines unlike the NASCAR Camping World Truck Series which ran full-size trucks. Most of the teams in the series were owner-driver combinations or family-owned. It was announced January 9, 2017 that the series would cease operations, effective immediately.

== History ==
The ARCA Truck Series ran exhibition races late in 1998 with the first full season in 1999. The series evolved from the series which ARCA sanctioned from 1990 through 1998 called The Pro 4 Series. The Pro 4 Series cars were full tube chassis stock cars with highly modified 4-cylinder engines. Both full body and open-wheel cars competed in the series together. With the popularity of the NASCAR Camping World Truck Series and trucks in general, a long time ARCA official came up with the idea to race compact trucks.

The inaugural season consisted of eleven asphalt and four dirt races in four states in the Midwest. The series produced ten different winners but sixteen-year-old Aaron Hulings dominated the series with six wins and eight pole awards but sat out the last race of the season for unknown reasons and the championship went to Pro 4 Series veteran Bill Withers. The decision to go to trucks was popular with fans and competitors alike. Over twenty three different trucks with twenty five drivers competed in the fifteen races the first season.

== Rules and truck bodies ==
The basic rules required the use of a tube frame racing chassis from ARCA approved builders, stock appearing fiberglass body from PMG approved suppliers, and specification Hoosier Racing Tire. Body styles are Mid-size trucks, the Ford Ranger, Chevrolet S-10 and the Chevrolet Colorado, Dodge Dakota, and Toyota Tacoma. The rules were very stable during the history of the series, the biggest change being the introduction of V8 engines in 2011. The V8 proved to be much more reliable and cost-effective than the V6 and the 4-cylinder engines partially because of the rules the ARCA Truck Series established: additionally, the fans seemed to be more interested in the V8-powered trucks.
