= 2018 Alsco 300 (Charlotte) =

11th race of the 2018 NASCAR Xfinity Series

Race details
- Race 11 of 33 of the 2018 NASCAR Xfinity Series
- Date: May 26, 2018
- Official name: 37th Annual Alsco 300
- Location: Concord, North Carolina, Charlotte Motor Speedway
- Course: Permanent racing facility
- Course length: 1.5 miles (2.41 km)
- Distance: 204 laps, 306 mi (492.459 km)
- Scheduled distance: 200 laps, 300 mi (482.803 km)
- Average speed: 108.596 miles per hour (174.768 km/h)

Pole position
Driver	Brad Keselowski	Team Penske
- Time: 29.287

Most laps led
Driver	Kyle Busch	Joe Gibbs Racing
- Laps: 93

Winner
No. 22	Brad Keselowski	Team Penske

Television in the United States
- Network: Fox Sports 1
- Announcers: Adam Alexander, Michael Waltrip, Erik Jones

Radio in the United States
- Radio: Performance Racing Network

The 2018 Alsco 300 was the 11th stock car race of the 2018 NASCAR Xfinity Series season and the 37th iteration of the event. The race was held on Saturday, May 26, 2018, in Concord, North Carolina at Charlotte Motor Speedway, a 1.5 miles (2.4 km) permanent quad-oval. The race was extended from 200 laps to 204 due to a NASCAR overtime finish. At race's end, Brad Keselowski of Team Penske would win the race under caution, as Tyler Reddick and Ty Majeski would both wreck on the backstretch on the final lap, putting out a caution. The win was Keselowski's 38th career NASCAR Xfinity Series win and his second of the season. To fill out the podium, Cole Custer of Stewart-Haas Racing with Biagi-DenBeste and Christopher Bell of Joe Gibbs Racing would finish second and third, respectively.

== Background ==
The layout of Charlotte Motor Speedway, the venue where the race was held.

The race was held at Charlotte Motor Speedway, located in Concord, North Carolina. The speedway complex includes a 1.5-mile (2.4 km) quad-oval track that was utilized for the race, as well as a dragstrip and a dirt track. The speedway was built in 1959 by Bruton Smith and is considered the home track for NASCAR with many race teams based in the Charlotte metropolitan area. The track is owned and operated by Speedway Motorsports Inc. (SMI) with Marcus G. Smith serving as track president.

=== Entry list ===
#	Driver	Team	Make	Sponsor
0	Garrett Smithley	JD Motorsports	Chevrolet	Trophy Tractor, FAME USA
00	Cole Custer	Stewart-Haas Racing with Biagi-DenBeste	Ford	Haas Automation
1	Elliott Sadler	JR Motorsports	Chevrolet	OneMain Financial "Lending Done Human"
01	Vinnie Miller	JD Motorsports	Chevrolet	JAS Expedited Trucking
2	Matt Tifft	Richard Childress Racing	Chevrolet	KC Motorgroup
3	Ty Dillon	Richard Childress Racing	Chevrolet	Nexium 24 HR
4	Ross Chastain	JD Motorsports	Chevrolet	Florida Watermelon Association
5	Michael Annett	JR Motorsports	Chevrolet	Pilot Flying J
7	Justin Allgaier	JR Motorsports	Chevrolet	Brandt Professional Agriculture
8	Tommy Joe Martins	B. J. McLeod Motorsports	Chevrolet	B. J. McLeod Motorsports
9	Tyler Reddick	JR Motorsports	Chevrolet	Pinnacle Financial Partners
11	Ryan Truex	Kaulig Racing	Chevrolet	Phantom Fireworks
12	Austin Cindric	Team Penske	Ford	Pirtek
15	Joe Nemechek	JD Motorsports	Chevrolet	JD Motorsports
16	Ryan Reed	Roush Fenway Racing	Ford	DriveDownA1C.com
18	Kyle Busch	Joe Gibbs Racing	Toyota	NOS Energy
19	Brandon Jones	Joe Gibbs Racing	Toyota	Menards, Jeld-Wen
20	Christopher Bell	Joe Gibbs Racing	Toyota	Rheem
21	Daniel Hemric	Richard Childress Racing	Chevrolet	South Point Hotel, Casino & Spa
22	Brad Keselowski	Team Penske	Ford	Fitzgerald Glider Kits
23	Chase Elliott	GMS Racing	Chevrolet	Hooters
28	Dylan Lupton	JGL Racing	Ford	Fatal Clothing
35	Joey Gase	Go Green Racing with SS-Green Light Racing	Chevrolet	LifeShare Carolinas
36	Alex Labbé	DGM Racing	Chevrolet	Wholey's, Can-Am
38	J. J. Yeley	RSS Racing	Chevrolet	RSS Racing
39	Ryan Sieg	RSS Racing	Chevrolet	Night Owl Contractors
40	Chad Finchum	MBM Motorsports	Toyota	Smithbilt Homes
42	Jamie McMurray	Chip Ganassi Racing	Chevrolet	DC Solar Patriotic
45	Josh Bilicki	JP Motorsports	Toyota	Prevagen
51	Jeremy Clements	Jeremy Clements Racing	Chevrolet	RepairableVehicles.com, All South Electric
52	David Starr	Jimmy Means Racing	Chevrolet	Extreme Kleaner, Chasco
55	Brandon Hightower	JP Motorsports	Toyota	Timmons Truck Center, Premier Recycling, LLC
60	Ty Majeski	Roush Fenway Racing	Ford	Ford Patriotic
61	Kaz Grala	Fury Race Cars	Ford	Nettts
66	Timmy Hill	MBM Motorsports	Dodge	CrashClaimsR.Us
74	Mike Harmon	Mike Harmon Racing	Chevrolet	Shadow Warriors Project, Horizon Transport
76	Spencer Boyd	SS-Green Light Racing	Chevrolet	Grunt Style "This We'll Defend"
78	B. J. McLeod	B. J. McLeod Motorsports	Chevrolet	B. J. McLeod Motorsports
89	Morgan Shepherd	Shepherd Racing Ventures	Chevrolet	Visone RV
90	Josh Williams	DGM Racing	Chevrolet	Star Tron, Sleep Well Sleep Disorder Specialists
93	Jeff Green	RSS Racing	Chevrolet	RSS Racing
98	Chase Briscoe	Stewart-Haas Racing with Biagi-DenBeste	Ford	Ford
99	B. J. McLeod	B. J. McLeod Motorsports	Chevrolet	B. J. McLeod Motorsports
Official entry list

== Practice ==
=== First practice ===
The first practice session would occur on Thursday, May 24, at 4:05 PM EST, and would last for 50 minutes. Kyle Busch of Joe Gibbs Racing would set the fastest time in the session, with a time of 29.773 and an average speed of 181.372 miles per hour (291.890 km/h).

Pos.	#	Driver	Team	Make	Time	Speed
1	18	Kyle Busch	Joe Gibbs Racing	Toyota	29.773	181.372
2	22	Brad Keselowski	Team Penske	Ford	29.979	180.126
3	23	Chase Elliott	GMS Racing	Chevrolet	29.982	180.108
Full first practice results

=== Second and final practice ===
The second and final practice session, sometimes referred to as Happy Hour, would occur on Thursday, May 24, at 6:05 PM EST, and would last for 45 minutes. Brad Keselowski of Team Penske would set the fastest time in the session, with a time of 29.615 and an average speed of 182.340 miles per hour (293.448 km/h).

Pos.	#	Driver	Team	Make	Time	Speed
1	22	Brad Keselowski	Team Penske	Ford	29.615	182.340
2	9	Tyler Reddick	JR Motorsports	Chevrolet	29.788	181.281
3	18	Kyle Busch	Joe Gibbs Racing	Toyota	29.807	181.165
Full Happy Hour practice results

== Qualifying ==
Qualifying would occur on Saturday, May 26, at 10:10 AM EST. Since Charlotte Motor Speedway is under 2 miles (3.2 km), the qualifying system was a multi-car system that included three rounds. The first round was 15 minutes, where every driver would be able to set a lap within the 15 minutes. Then, the second round would consist of the fastest 24 cars in Round 1, and drivers would have 10 minutes to set a lap. Round 3 consisted of the fastest 12 drivers from Round 2, and the drivers would have 5 minutes to set a time. Whoever was fastest in Round 3 would win the pole.

Brad Keselowski of Team Penske would win the pole, setting a time of 29.287 and an average speed of 184.382 miles per hour (296.734 km/h) in the third round.

=== Full qualifying results ===
Pos.	#	Driver	Team	Make	Time (R1)	Speed (R1)	Time (R2)	Speed (R2)	Time (R3)	Speed (R3)
1	22	Brad Keselowski	Team Penske	Ford	29.354	183.961	29.441	183.418	29.287	184.382
2	00	Cole Custer	Stewart-Haas Racing with Biagi-DenBeste	Ford	29.520	182.927	29.488	183.125	29.331	184.106
3	18	Kyle Busch	Joe Gibbs Racing	Toyota	29.889	180.668	29.431	183.480	29.431	183.480
4	9	Tyler Reddick	JR Motorsports	Chevrolet	29.600	182.432	29.516	182.952	29.438	183.436
5	19	Brandon Jones	Joe Gibbs Racing	Toyota	29.573	182.599	29.528	182.877	29.457	183.318
6	23	Chase Elliott	GMS Racing	Chevrolet	29.664	182.039	29.512	182.976	29.485	183.144
7	20	Christopher Bell	Joe Gibbs Racing	Toyota	29.758	181.464	29.670	182.002	29.514	182.964
8	12	Austin Cindric	Team Penske	Ford	29.251	184.609	29.459	183.306	29.530	182.865
9	98	Chase Briscoe	Stewart-Haas Racing with Biagi-DenBeste	Ford	29.785	181.299	29.622	182.297	29.597	182.451
10	7	Justin Allgaier	JR Motorsports	Chevrolet	29.491	183.107	29.743	181.555	29.708	181.769
11	60	Ty Majeski	Roush Fenway Racing	Ford	29.716	181.720	29.674	181.977	29.780	181.330
12	42	Jamie McMurray	Chip Ganassi Racing	Chevrolet	29.601	182.426	29.762	181.439	29.810	181.147
Eliminated in Round 2
13	1	Elliott Sadler	JR Motorsports	Chevrolet	29.841	180.959	29.779	181.336	—	—
14	3	Ty Dillon	Richard Childress Racing	Chevrolet	29.596	182.457	29.825	181.056	—	—
15	11	Ryan Truex	Kaulig Racing	Chevrolet	29.758	181.464	29.842	180.953	—	—
16	61	Kaz Grala	Fury Race Cars	Ford	29.757	181.470	29.883	180.705	—	—
17	21	Daniel Hemric	Richard Childress Racing	Chevrolet	29.973	180.162	29.903	180.584	—	—
18	4	Ross Chastain	JD Motorsports	Chevrolet	30.027	179.838	29.957	180.258	—	—
19	2	Matt Tifft	Richard Childress Racing	Chevrolet	29.892	180.650	29.990	180.060	—	—
20	51	Jeremy Clements	Jeremy Clements Racing	Chevrolet	29.882	180.711	30.048	179.712	—	—
21	39	Ryan Sieg	RSS Racing	Chevrolet	29.723	181.677	30.177	178.944	—	—
22	38	J. J. Yeley	RSS Racing	Chevrolet	30.016	179.904	30.191	178.861	—	—
23	28	Dylan Lupton	JGL Racing	Ford	29.887	180.681	30.545	176.788	—	—
24	66	Timmy Hill	MBM Motorsports	Dodge	30.109	179.348	—	—	—	—
Eliminated in Round 1
25	5	Michael Annett	JR Motorsports	Chevrolet	30.139	179.170	—	—	—	—
26	35	Joey Gase	Go Green Racing with SS-Green Light Racing	Chevrolet	30.170	178.986	—	—	—	—
27	36	Alex Labbé	DGM Racing	Chevrolet	30.289	178.283	—	—	—	—
28	15	Joe Nemechek	JD Motorsports	Chevrolet	30.349	177.930	—	—	—	—
29	93	Jeff Green	RSS Racing	Chevrolet	30.358	177.877	—	—	—	—
30	99	B. J. McLeod	B. J. McLeod Motorsports	Chevrolet	30.438	177.410	—	—	—	—
31	8	Tommy Joe Martins	B. J. McLeod Motorsports	Chevrolet	30.584	176.563	—	—	—	—
32	01	Vinnie Miller	JD Motorsports	Chevrolet	30.870	174.927	—	—	—	—
33	76	Spencer Boyd	SS-Green Light Racing	Chevrolet	30.892	174.803	—	—	—	—
Qualified by owner's points
34	90	Josh Williams	DGM Racing	Chevrolet	30.928	174.599	—	—	—	—
35	52	David Starr	Jimmy Means Racing	Chevrolet	30.951	174.469	—	—	—	—
36	0	Garrett Smithley	JD Motorsports	Chevrolet	31.089	173.695	—	—	—	—
37	78	Ray Black Jr.	B. J. McLeod Motorsports	Chevrolet	31.116	173.544	—	—	—	—
38	45	Josh Bilicki	JP Motorsports	Toyota	31.584	170.973	—	—	—	—
39	55	Brandon Hightower	JP Motorsports	Toyota	31.588	170.951	—	—	—	—
40	16	Ryan Reed	Roush Fenway Racing	Ford	—	—	—	—	—	—
Failed to qualify
41	40	Chad Finchum	MBM Motorsports	Toyota	30.981	174.300	—	—	—	—
42	89	Morgan Shepherd	Shepherd Racing Ventures	Chevrolet	31.229	172.916	—	—	—	—
43	74	Mike Harmon	Mike Harmon Racing	Chevrolet	31.785	169.891	—	—	—	—
Official qualifying results
Official starting lineup

== Race results ==
Stage 1 Laps: 45

Pos.	#	Driver	Team	Make	Pts
1	18	Kyle Busch	Joe Gibbs Racing	Toyota	0
2	19	Brandon Jones	Joe Gibbs Racing	Toyota	9
3	23	Chase Elliott	GMS Racing	Chevrolet	0
4	20	Christopher Bell	Joe Gibbs Racing	Toyota	7
5	22	Brad Keselowski	Team Penske	Ford	0
6	7	Justin Allgaier	JR Motorsports	Chevrolet	5
7	00	Cole Custer	Stewart-Haas Racing with Biagi-DenBeste	Ford	4
8	21	Daniel Hemric	Richard Childress Racing	Chevrolet	3
9	42	Jamie McMurray	Chip Ganassi Racing	Chevrolet	0
10	9	Tyler Reddick	JR Motorsports	Chevrolet	1

Stage 2 Laps: 45

Pos.	#	Driver	Team	Make	Pts
1	18	Kyle Busch	Joe Gibbs Racing	Toyota	0
2	00	Cole Custer	Stewart-Haas Racing with Biagi-DenBeste	Ford	9
3	19	Brandon Jones	Joe Gibbs Racing	Toyota	8
4	42	Jamie McMurray	Chip Ganassi Racing	Chevrolet	0
5	3	Ty Dillon	Richard Childress Racing	Chevrolet	0
6	20	Christopher Bell	Joe Gibbs Racing	Toyota	5
7	23	Chase Elliott	GMS Racing	Chevrolet	0
8	7	Justin Allgaier	JR Motorsports	Chevrolet	3
9	2	Matt Tifft	Richard Childress Racing	Chevrolet	2
10	98	Chase Briscoe	Stewart-Haas Racing with Biagi-DenBeste	Ford	1

Stage 3 Laps: 114

Fin	St	#	Driver	Team	Make	Laps	Led	Status	Pts
1	1	22	Brad Keselowski	Team Penske	Ford	204	77	running	0
2	2	00	Cole Custer	Stewart-Haas Racing with Biagi-DenBeste	Ford	204	29	running	48
3	7	20	Christopher Bell	Joe Gibbs Racing	Toyota	204	0	running	46
4	14	3	Ty Dillon	Richard Childress Racing	Chevrolet	204	0	running	0
5	13	1	Elliott Sadler	JR Motorsports	Chevrolet	204	0	running	32
6	15	11	Ryan Truex	Kaulig Racing	Chevrolet	204	0	running	31
7	17	21	Daniel Hemric	Richard Childress Racing	Chevrolet	204	3	running	33
8	3	18	Kyle Busch	Joe Gibbs Racing	Toyota	204	93	running	0
9	19	2	Matt Tifft	Richard Childress Racing	Chevrolet	204	0	running	30
10	16	61	Kaz Grala	Fury Race Cars	Ford	204	0	running	27
11	9	98	Chase Briscoe	Stewart-Haas Racing with Biagi-DenBeste	Ford	204	0	running	27
12	25	5	Michael Annett	JR Motorsports	Chevrolet	204	0	running	25
13	21	39	Ryan Sieg	RSS Racing	Chevrolet	204	0	running	24
14	36	0	Garrett Smithley	JD Motorsports	Chevrolet	204	1	running	23
15	5	19	Brandon Jones	Joe Gibbs Racing	Toyota	204	0	running	39
16	8	12	Austin Cindric	Team Penske	Ford	204	0	running	21
17	26	35	Joey Gase	Go Green Racing with SS-Green Light Racing	Chevrolet	204	0	running	20
18	28	15	Joe Nemechek	JD Motorsports	Chevrolet	204	0	running	0
19	37	78	Ray Black Jr.	B. J. McLeod Motorsports	Chevrolet	204	0	running	18
20	35	52	David Starr	Jimmy Means Racing	Chevrolet	204	0	running	17
21	33	76	Spencer Boyd	SS-Green Light Racing	Chevrolet	204	0	running	16
22	11	60	Ty Majeski	Roush Fenway Racing	Ford	203	0	running	15
23	4	9	Tyler Reddick	JR Motorsports	Chevrolet	202	0	running	15
24	31	8	Tommy Joe Martins	B. J. McLeod Motorsports	Chevrolet	198	0	running	13
25	38	45	Josh Bilicki	JP Motorsports	Toyota	198	0	running	12
26	18	4	Ross Chastain	JD Motorsports	Chevrolet	198	0	running	11
27	39	55	Brandon Hightower	JP Motorsports	Toyota	197	0	running	10
28	32	01	Vinnie Miller	JD Motorsports	Chevrolet	194	0	running	9
29	40	16	Ryan Reed	Roush Fenway Racing	Ford	192	0	running	8
30	24	66	Timmy Hill	MBM Motorsports	Dodge	189	0	running	7
31	12	42	Jamie McMurray	Chip Ganassi Racing	Chevrolet	181	0	crash	0
32	10	7	Justin Allgaier	JR Motorsports	Chevrolet	180	0	crash	13
33	23	28	Dylan Lupton	JGL Racing	Ford	168	0	crash	4
34	27	36	Alex Labbé	DGM Racing	Chevrolet	140	0	crash	3
35	20	51	Jeremy Clements	Jeremy Clements Racing	Chevrolet	135	0	running	2
36	22	38	J. J. Yeley	RSS Racing	Chevrolet	134	1	fuel pump	1
37	6	23	Chase Elliott	GMS Racing	Chevrolet	98	0	transmission	0
38	34	90	Josh Williams	DGM Racing	Chevrolet	26	0	oil leak	1
39	29	93	Jeff Green	RSS Racing	Chevrolet	5	0	vibration	1
40	30	99	B. J. McLeod	B. J. McLeod Motorsports	Chevrolet	3	0	vibration	1
Failed to qualify
41		40	Chad Finchum	MBM Motorsports	Toyota				
42		89	Morgan Shepherd	Shepherd Racing Ventures	Chevrolet				
43		74	Mike Harmon	Mike Harmon Racing	Chevrolet				
Official race results

Previous race: 2018 OneMain Financial 200	NASCAR Xfinity Series; 2018 season	Next race: 2018 Pocono Green 250
