= Biagi–DenBeste Racing =

American racing team

- Owner(s): Fred & Greg Biagi (Biagi Brothers); Bill & Lori DenBeste
- Base: Kannapolis, North Carolina
- Series: Xfinity Series
- Opened: 2001
- Closed: 2017 (merged with Stewart–Haas Racing); 2019 (end of partnership)

Career
- Debut: 2001 Auto Club 300 (Fontana)
- Latest race: 2019 Ford Ecoboost 300 (Homestead)
- Races competed: 278
- Drivers' Championships: 0
- Race victories: 14 (Note: 3 wins for Biagi–DenBeste Racing and 11 for Stewart–Haas Racing with Biagi–DenBeste.)
- Pole positions: 14

Biagi–DenBeste Racing, originally Biagi Brothers Racing, was an American professional stock car racing team that last competed in the NASCAR Xfinity Series in partnership with Stewart–Haas Racing. The team was based in Mooresville, North Carolina.

== Xfinity Series ==
=== 2001–2006 ===
The team debuted in 2001 at the Auto Club 300 as the No. 4 car, qualifying 41st and finishing 31st with Mike Wallace driving their Chevrolet. Wallace made eight starts total that season, his best finish a tenth at Richmond International Raceway. Wallace returned in 2002, running seventeen races. He finished in the top-twenty seven times, including two fourteenth-place finishes. The team also ran a second car, the No. 07, for Tim Fedewa at Talladega, finishing third, the last car on the lead lap (mostly due to a 27-car pileup on lap 15 that took out most of the field, including Wallace).

In 2003, Biagi moved up to the Busch Series full-time with Wallace. They opened the season with a fourth-place finish at the Koolerz 300. Despite missing a race where Rick Carelli filled in, Wallace finished thirteenth in points that year, one position shy of matching his career-best. The following season, Biagi switched from Chevrolets to Fords, and at the Winn-Dixie 250, Wallace took the lead on the last lap to score Biagi's first career Busch victory. He led eighteen laps the following week at Chicagoland Speedway, but ran out of fuel on the last lap, costing him the victory. After posting three more top-tens, Wallace finished seventeenth in points.

After Wallace departed in 2005, Biagi formed a partnership with Chip Ganassi Racing and hired Ganassi development driver Ryan Hemphill. After he failed to qualify for two consecutive races, Hemphill was briefly replaced by Jeff Green, who finished sixth at Richmond. Hemphill returned for three races and had a twelfth-place run at Nashville Superspeedway before he was permanently removed from the ride. Green took over for three races, before Kevin Hamlin took over for the balance of the season. In fourteen starts, his best finish was fourteenth at Memphis Motorsports Park.

For 2006, Mark Green was selected as the team's new driver, and had an eighteenth-place run at Richmond, before he was released in favor of Auggie Vidovich. In addition to Green and Vidovich, Hamlin, Boris Said, and Paul Tracy have driven the car during the 2006 season.

In 2007, BDBR had announced it would switch to Toyota and run with sponsorship from Kibbles 'n Bits, but the team shut down in January due to a lack of funding. Its assets and owners points were acquired by Braun Racing, and the team's number, 4, assigned to Ginn Racing.

==== Car No. 4 results ====
NASCAR Busch Series results
Year	Driver	No.	Make	1	2	3	4	5	6	7	8	9	10	11	12	13	14	15	16	17	18	19	20	21	22	23	24	25	26	27	28	29	30	31	32	33	34	35	NBSC	Pts
2001	Mike Wallace	4	Chevy	DAY	CAR	LVS	ATL	DAR	BRI	TEX	NSH	TAL	CAL; 31	RCH	NHA	NZH	CLT; 31	DOV	KEN	MLW	GLN	CHI; 32	GTY	PPR	IRP	MCH; 27	BRI	DAR	RCH; 10	DOV	KAN; 23	CLT	MEM	PHO; 37	CAR	HOM; 23			49th	663
2002	Mike Wallace	4	Pontiac	DAY; DNQ	CAR	LVS; 25	DAR	BRI			TAL; 38										DAY; 14																		39th	1584
2002	Mike Wallace	4	Chevy						TEX; 27	NSH		CAL; 36	RCH	NHA	NZH	CLT; 39	DOV	NSH	KEN; 31	MLW		CHI; 14	GTY; 20	PPR	IRP; 18	MCH; 19	BRI; 42	DAR	RCH; 24	DOV; 18	KAN; DNQ	CLT; 15	MEM	ATL; 24	CAR	PHO; 21	HOM; DNQ		39th	1584
2003	Mike Wallace	4	Pontiac	DAY; 4						TAL; 8											DAY; 13																		15th	3595
2003	Mike Wallace	4	Chevy		CAR; 36	LVS; 18	DAR; 16	BRI; 11	TEX; 30		NSH; 28	CAL; 16	RCH; 12	GTY; 16	NZH; 17	CLT; 20	DOV; 17	NSH; 24	KEN; 13	MLW; 22		CHI; 17	NHA		IRP; 19	MCH; 27	BRI; 16	DAR; 15	RCH; 17	DOV; 10	KAN; 15	CLT; 19	MEM; 17	ATL; 17	PHO; 18	CAR; 29	HOM; 23		15th	3595
2003	Rick Carelli	4	Chevy																					PPR; 19															15th	3595
2004	Mike Wallace	4	Ford	DAY; 35	CAR; 17	LVS; 20	DAR; 36	BRI; 10	TEX; 19	NSH; 38	TAL; 11	CAL; 20	GTY; 41	RCH; 32	NZH; 14	CLT; 29	DOV; 28	NSH; 12	KEN; 31	MLW; 11	DAY; 1	CHI; 15	NHA; 10	PPR; 23	IRP; 21	MCH; 9	BRI; 13	CAL; 18	RCH; 19	DOV; 25	KAN; 18	CLT; 19	MEM; 30	ATL; 21	PHO; 27	DAR; 17	HOM; 25		21st	3461
2005	Ryan Hemphill	4	Dodge	DAY; 36	CAL; 27	MXC; 17	LVS; 29	ATL; 30	NSH; 31	BRI; 33	TEX; 41	PHO; DNQ	TAL; DNQ					NSH; 12	KEN; 28	MLW; 33																			27th	2919
2005	Jeff Green	4	Dodge											DAR; 28	RCH; 6	CLT; 17	DOV; 38				DAY; 15	CHI; 38	NHA; 17																27th	2919
2005	Kevin Hamlin	4	Dodge																					PPR; 17	GTY; 23	IRP; 26		MCH; 31	BRI; 22	CAL; 42	RCH; 20	DOV; 34	KAN; 31	CLT; 15	MEM; 14	TEX; 28	PHO; 23	HOM; 35	27th	2919
2005	Scott Pruett	4	Dodge																								GLN; 14												27th	2919
2006	Mark Green	4	Dodge	DAY; 10	CAL; 43		LVS; 31	ATL; 28	BRI; 22	TEX; 33	NSH; 38	PHO; 15	TAL; 28	RCH; 15	DAR; 27																								32nd	2766
2006	Paul Tracy	4	Dodge			MXC; 37																																	32nd	2766
2006	Boris Said	4	Dodge													CLT; 31																							32nd	2766
2006	Auggie Vidovich	4	Dodge														DOV; 29	NSH; 33	KEN; 34	MLW; 15		CHI; 32	NHA; 28	MAR; 25	GTY; 21	IRP; 34	GLN; 21	MCH; 38	BRI; 32	CAL; 43	RCH; 27	DOV; 27	KAN; 20	CLT; 33	MEM; 15	TEX; 38	PHO; 33	HOM; 32	32nd	2766
2006	Kevin Hamlin	4	Dodge																		DAY; 27																		32nd	2766

==== Car No. 07 results ====
NASCAR Busch Series results
Year	Driver	No.	Make	1	2	3	4	5	6	7	8	9	10	11	12	13	14	15	16	17	18	19	20	21	22	23	24	25	26	27	28	29	30	31	32	33	34	NBSC	Pts
2002	Tim Fedewa	07	Pontiac	DAY	CAR	LVS	DAR	BRI	TEX	NSH	TAL; 3	CAL	RCH	NHA	NZH	CLT	DOV	NSH	KEN	MLW	DAY	CHI	GTY	PPR	IRP	MCH	BRI	DAR	RCH	DOV	KAN	CLT	MEM	ATL	CAR	PHO	HOM	N/A	0

=== 2012–2019 ===
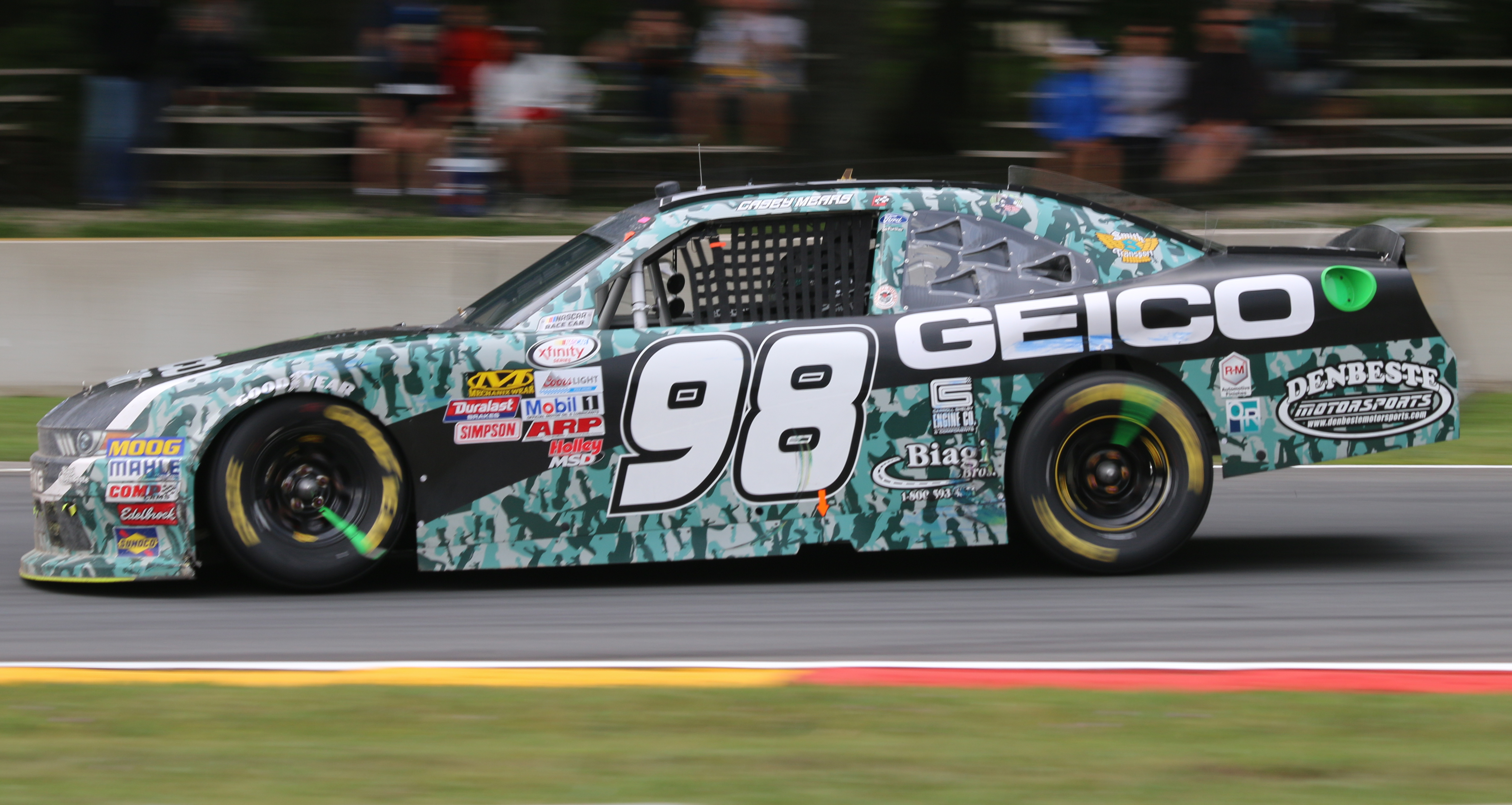
Casey Mears in 2017 at Road America

Five years later, the team returned at Charlotte Motor Speedway in May 2012, with a new sponsor in Caroll Shelby Engine Company (owned by new partners Bill and Lori DenBeste), a new manufacturer Ford, and a new number 98 car being driven by Reed Sorenson. The car was given a black and gold scheme to honor the late Carroll Shelby and Shelby American's 50th Anniversary. Sorenson finished 16th in the team's return, then finished 13th in their next race at Kentucky. The team dedicated their third race of the season, at the famed Indianapolis Motor Speedway, to Shelby, though Sorenson would finish 34th after a crash. He would run two more races, with a crash at Atlanta and a 12th place and the second Charlotte race. Sprint Car standout and ARCA Racing Series winner Kevin Swindell was signed for two races at the end of the season. He finished a strong 9th at Texas, then placed 21st at the season-finale at Homestead.

For 2013, Kevin Swindell was signed to run 15 races for the team, beginning at Las Vegas in March. The team partnered with Swindell's long time supporter Mike Curb, who became the listed owner of the No. 98 car (as well as the No. 98 car of Phil Parsons Racing in the Cup Series and the No. 98 truck of Johnny Sauter and ThorSport Racing in the Truck Series). Swindell had two top 10s, though he failed to qualify in their first attempt at Las Vegas.

In 2014, the team returned again with veteran David Ragan as well as up-and-comers Jeb Burton and Corey LaJoie; all three are the sons of former racers. Drive for Diversity and NASCAR Next member Ryan Gifford was signed to run two races for the team: Iowa in May and Kentucky in June. Gifford finished 20th in his only appearance at Iowa. After winning the Coke Zero 400 at Daytona and earning a spot in the Chase for the Sprint Cup, Aric Almirola signed on to pilot the 98 during two companion races at Chicagoland and Dover in September. Cup sponsor Smithfield Foods would come on to sponsor Almirola's efforts. Almirola started 10th and finished 14th in his debut for the team at Chicagoland, then 13th at Dover. After running one race earlier in the year, it was announced that Corey LaJoie would return to the No. 98 car for four additional races (Kansas, Charlotte, Texas, and Homestead), with backing from Richard Petty Motorsports primary investor Medallion Financial.

In 2015, Richard Petty Motorsports Sprint Cup drivers Almirola and Sam Hornish Jr. split time driving the No. 98, with sponsorship from both RPM's Cup sponsors and Biagi-DenBeste's regular sponsors. Almirola finished 7th in the season opener at Daytona, while Hornish finished 15th the next week at Atlanta. RPM development driver Ryan Truex drove four races, starting at Richmond.

In 2016, Almirola drove on a partial schedule starting at Daytona. Almirola won the 2016 Subway Firecracker 250 at Daytona to give the team their second ever win. Jeb Burton will drive two races in the No. 98 car starting with Indy, Richmond, and Charlotte with Estes sponsoring. 2014-15 Formula E Champion Nelson Piquet Jr. will drive the No. 98 car at Mid-Ohio Sports Car Course.

In 2017, it was announced that Aric Almirola would return to Biagi-DenBeste with the addition of Casey Mears. On May 6, 2017 Aric Almirola won the 2017 Sparks Energy 300 at Talladega Superspeedway.

On October 23, 2017, it was announced that in 2018 the team would partner with Stewart–Haas Racing under the name Stewart–Haas Racing with Biagi-DenBeste with Cole Custer driving the No. 00 full time and Kevin Harvick driving the No. 98 part time. It was later announced that Chase Briscoe would drive the No. 98 in at least one race.

==== Car No. 98 results ====
Year	Driver	No.	Make	1	2	3	4	5	6	7	8	9	10	11	12	13	14	15	16	17	18	19	20	21	22	23	24	25	26	27	28	29	30	31	32	33	NXSC	Pts
2012	Reed Sorenson	98	Ford	DAY	PHO	LVS	BRI	CAL	TEX	RCH	TAL	DAR	IOW	CLT; 16	DOV	MCH	ROA	KEN; 13	DAY	NHA	CHI	IND; 33	IOW	GLN	CGV	BRI	ATL; 32	RCH	CHI	KEN	DOV	CLT; 12	KAN				41st	173
2012	Kevin Swindell	98	Ford																															TEX; 9	PHO	HOM; 21	41st	173
2013	Kevin Swindell	98	Ford	DAY	PHO	LVS; DNQ	BRI	CAL; 10	TEX; 16	RCH; 18	TAL	DAR	CLT; 18	DOV	IOW; 28	MCH	ROA	KEN; 11	DAY; 26	NHA	CHI	IND; 8	IOW	GLN	MOH	BRI; 25	ATL	RCH	CHI; 16	KEN	DOV	KAN	CLT; 16	TEX; 16	PHO; 34	HOM; 35	34th	342
2014	David Ragan	98	Ford	DAY; DNQ	PHO	LVS; 17	BRI	CAL; 13	TEX	DAR	RCH	TAL; 4							DAY; 23	NHA	CHI	IND; 13	IOW	GLN	MOH	BRI	ATL; 8	RCH									33rd	385
2014	Ryan Gifford	98	Ford										IOW; 20																								33rd	385
2014	Jeb Burton	98	Ford											CLT; 15	DOV	MCH	ROA																				33rd	385
2014	Corey LaJoie	98	Ford															KEN; 16														KAN; 26	CLT; 24	TEX; 32	PHO	HOM; 37	33rd	385
2014	Aric Almirola	98	Ford																										CHI; 14	KEN	DOV; 13						33rd	385
2015	Aric Almirola	98	Ford	DAY; 7		LVS; 11	PHO				RCH; 15	TAL; 10	IOW	CLT; 19	DOV	MCH; 8	CHI	DAY; 35	KEN	NHA	IND; 14	IOW	GLN	MOH	BRI	ROA	DAR									HOM; 12	33rd	412
2015	Sam Hornish Jr.	98	Ford		ATL; 15			CAL; 37	TEX; 14	BRI																											33rd	412
2015	Ryan Truex	98	Ford																									RCH; 31	CHI	KEN; 28	DOV	CLT; 17	KAN	TEX; 20	PHO		33rd	412
2016	Aric Almirola	98	Ford	DAY; 11	ATL	LVS; 12	PHO	CAL; 11	TEX; 17	BRI; 10	RCH	TAL; 10	DOV	CLT	POC; 11	MCH	IOW	DAY; 1	KEN	NHA															PHO; 12	HOM; 10	29th	391
2016	Jeb Burton	98	Ford																		IND; 12	IOW	GLN					RCH; 19	CHI	KEN	DOV	CLT; 17	KAN	TEX			29th	391
2016	Nelson Piquet Jr.	98	Ford																					MOH; 38	BRI	ROA	DAR										29th	391
2017	Aric Almirola	98	Ford	DAY; 23	ATL; 19	LVS; 17	PHO					TAL; 1													BRI; 38												26th	379
2017	Casey Mears	98	Ford					CAL; 14	TEX; 38	BRI	RCH; 9		CLT; 21	DOV	POC; 21	MCH	IOW	DAY; 34	KEN; 15	NHA	IND	IOW	GLN; 25	MOH; 32		ROA; 9	DAR	RCH; 25			DOV; 18	CLT	KAN	TEX	PHO; 12	HOM; 11	26th	379
2017	Bubba Wallace	98	Ford																										CHI; 10	KEN							26th	379
2018	Aric Almirola	98	Ford	DAY; 35																			GLN; 5	MOH	BRI	ROA											29th	342
2018	Kevin Harvick	98	Ford		ATL; 1*	LVS	PHO	CAL	TEX; 19							MCH; 8	IOW	CHI; 2	DAY	KEN	NHA	IOW					DAR; 29	IND	LVS	RCH							29th	342
2018	Chase Briscoe	98	Ford							BRI; 23	RCH	TAL; 16	DOV	CLT; 11	POC																ROV; 1*	DOV	KAN; 30	TEX	PHO	HOM	29th	342
2019	Chase Briscoe	98	Ford	DAY; 12	ATL; 15	LVS; 8	PHO; 6	CAL; 5	TEX; 4	BRI; 4	RCH; 8	TAL; 4	DOV; 5	CLT; 19	POC; 3	MCH; 7	IOW; 7	CHI; 15	DAY; 35	KEN; 5	NHA; 6	IOW; 1	GLN; 6	MOH; 7	BRI; 2	ROA; 7	DAR; 6	IND; 8	LVS; 11	RCH; 5	ROV; 9*	DOV; 5*	KAN; 3	TEX; 22	PHO; 8	HOM; 3	5th	2302
