= 2019 Drive for the Cure 250 =

Race details
- Race 28 of 33 in the 2019 NASCAR Xfinity Series season
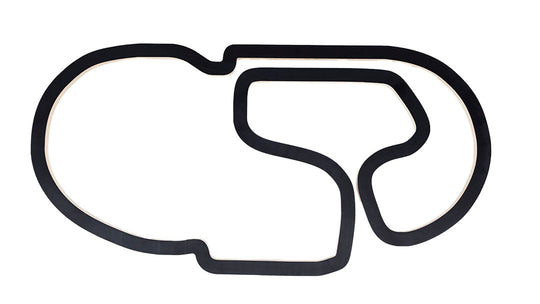
- Date: September 28, 2019
- Location: Charlotte Motor Speedway in Concord, North Carolina
- Course: Permanent racing facility
- Course length: 2.28 miles (3.67 km)
- Distance: 67 laps, 152.76 mi (245.843 km)

Pole position
Driver	Chase Briscoe	Stewart-Haas Racing with Biagi-DenBeste Racing
- Time: 83.232

Most laps led
Driver	Chase Briscoe	Stewart-Haas Racing with Biagi-DenBeste Racing
- Laps: 21

Winner
No. 10	A. J. Allmendinger	Kaulig Racing

Television in the United States
- Network: NBCSN

Radio in the United States
- Radio: MRN

The 2019 Drive for the Cure 250 presented by Blue Cross Blue Shield of North Carolina is a NASCAR Xfinity Series race held on September 28, 2019, at Charlotte Motor Speedway in Concord, North Carolina. Contested over 67 laps on the 2.28-mile (3.67 km) road course, it was the 28th race of the 2019 NASCAR Xfinity Series season, second race of the Playoffs, and the second race of the Round of 12.

== Background ==
=== Track ===
Charlotte Motor Speedway, the track where the race was held.

Since 2018, deviating from past NASCAR events at Charlotte, the race will utilize a road course configuration of Charlotte Motor Speedway, promoted and trademarked as the "Roval". The course is 2.28 miles (3.67 km) in length and features 17 turns, utilizing the infield road course and portions of the oval track. The race will be contested over a scheduled distance of 67 laps, 245.803 kilometres (152.735 mi).

== Entry list ==
No.	Driver	Team	Manufacturer
00	Cole Custer	Stewart-Haas Racing with Biagi-DenBeste Racing	Ford
0	Lawson Aschenbach	JD Motorsports	Chevrolet
01	Stephen Leicht	JD Motorsports	Chevrolet
1	Michael Annett	JR Motorsports	Chevrolet
2	Tyler Reddick	Richard Childress Racing	Chevrolet
4	Garrett Smithley	JD Motorsports	Chevrolet
5	Vinnie Miller	B. J. McLeod Motorsports	Chevrolet
07	Ray Black Jr.	SS-Green Light Racing	Chevrolet
7	Justin Allgaier	JR Motorsports	Chevrolet
08	Gray Gaulding (R)	SS-Green Light Racing	Chevrolet
8	Ryan Truex	JR Motorsports	Chevrolet
9	Noah Gragson (R)	JR Motorsports	Chevrolet
10	A. J. Allmendinger	Kaulig Racing	Chevrolet
11	Justin Haley (R)	Kaulig Racing	Chevrolet
13	Chad Finchum	MBM Motorsports	Toyota
15	B. J. McLeod	JD Motorsports	Chevrolet
18	Harrison Burton (i)	Joe Gibbs Racing	Toyota
19	Brandon Jones	Joe Gibbs Racing	Toyota
20	Christopher Bell	Joe Gibbs Racing	Toyota
22	Austin Cindric	Team Penske	Ford
23	John Hunter Nemechek (R)	GMS Racing	Chevrolet
35	Joey Gase	MBM Motorsports	Toyota
36	Josh Williams	DGM Racing	Chevrolet
38	Bayley Currey (i)	RSS Racing	Chevrolet
39	Ryan Sieg	RSS Racing	Chevrolet
43	Preston Pardus	Pardus Racing Inc.	Chevrolet
51	Jeremy Clements	Jeremy Clements Racing	Chevrolet
52	David Starr	Jimmy Means Racing	Chevrolet
61	Tommy Joe Martins	MBM Motorsports	Toyota
66	Timmy Hill	MBM Motorsports	Toyota
68	Brandon Brown (R)	Brandonbilt Motorsports	Chevrolet
74	Joe Nemechek (i)	Mike Harmon Racing	Chevrolet
78	J. J. Yeley	B. J. McLeod Motorsports	Toyota
86	Will Rodgers	Brandonbilt Motorsports	Chevrolet
90	Alex Labbé	DGM Racing	Chevrolet
93	Josh Bilicki	RSS Racing	Chevrolet
98	Chase Briscoe (R)	Stewart-Haas Racing with Biagi-DenBeste Racing	Ford
99	Cody Ware	B. J. McLeod Motorsports	Chevrolet
Official Entry List

== Practice ==
=== First practice ===
Christopher Bell was the fastest in the first practice session with a time of 84.489 seconds and a speed of 98.853 mph (159.088 km/h).

Pos	No.	Driver	Team	Manufacturer	Time	Speed
1	20	Christopher Bell	Joe Gibbs Racing	Toyota	1:24.489	98.853
2	22	Austin Cindric	Team Penske	Ford	1:24.536	98.798
3	10	A. J. Allmendinger	Kaulig Racing	Chevrolet	1:24.570	98.758

=== Final practice ===
A. J. Allmendinger was the fastest in the final practice session with a time of 83.938 seconds and a speed of 99.502 mph (160.133 km/h).

Pos	No.	Driver	Team	Manufacturer	Time	Speed
1	10	A. J. Allmendinger	Kaulig Racing	Chevrolet	1:23.938	99.502
2	98	Chase Briscoe (R)	Stewart-Haas Racing with Biagi-DenBeste Racing	Ford	1:24.367	98.996
3	00	Cole Custer	Stewart-Haas Racing with Biagi-DenBeste Racing	Ford	1:24.400	98.957

== Qualifying ==
Chase Briscoe scored the pole for the race with a time of 83.232 seconds and a speed of 100.346 mph (161.491 km/h).

=== Qualifying results ===
Pos	No	Driver	Team	Manufacturer	Time
1	98	Chase Briscoe (R)	Stewart-Haas Racing with Biagi-DenBeste Racing	Ford	1:23.232
2	2	Tyler Reddick	Richard Childress Racing	Chevrolet	83.247
3	22	Austin Cindric	Team Penske	Ford	83.369
4	00	Cole Custer	Stewart-Haas Racing with Biagi-DenBeste Racing	Ford	83.439
5	10	A. J. Allmendinger	Kaulig Racing	Chevrolet	83.567
6	90	Alex Labbé	DGM Racing	Chevrolet	83.638
7	7	Justin Allgaier	JR Motorsports	Chevrolet	83.772
8	51	Jeremy Clements	Jeremy Clements Racing	Chevrolet	84.407
9	11	Justin Haley (R)	Kaulig Racing	Chevrolet	84.709
10	86	Will Rodgers	Brandonbilt Motorsports	Chevrolet	85.056
11	20	Christopher Bell	Joe Gibbs Racing	Toyota	99.367
12	9	Noah Gragson (R)	JR Motorsports	Chevrolet	84.831
13	8	Ryan Truex	JR Motorsports	Chevrolet	84.858
14	23	John Hunter Nemechek (R)	GMS Racing	Chevrolet	84.875
15	19	Brandon Jones	Joe Gibbs Racing	Toyota	84.940
16	43	Preston Pardus	Pardus Racing Inc.	Chevrolet	84.991
17	08	Gray Gaulding (R)	SS-Green Light Racing	Chevrolet	85.142
18	61	Tommy Joe Martins	MBM Motorsports	Toyota	85.426
19	0	Lawson Aschenbach	JD Motorsports	Chevrolet	85.758
20	36	Josh Williams	DGM Racing	Chevrolet	85.768
21	66	Timmy Hill	MBM Motorsports	Toyota	85.841
22	18	Harrison Burton (i)	Joe Gibbs Racing	Toyota	85.904
23	1	Michael Annett	JR Motorsports	Chevrolet	85.914
24	07	Ray Black Jr.	SS-Green Light Racing	Chevrolet	85.944
25	39	Ryan Sieg	RSS Racing	Chevrolet	86.028
26	01	Stephen Leicht	JD Motorsports	Chevrolet	86.155
27	4	Garrett Smithley	JD Motorsports	Chevrolet	86.377
28	93	Josh Bilicki	RSS Racing	Chevrolet	87.064
29	78	J. J. Yeley	B. J. McLeod Motorsports	Toyota	87.501
30	74	Joe Nemechek	Mike Harmon Racing	Chevrolet	87.503
31	52	David Starr	Jimmy Means Racing	Chevrolet	88.016
32	99	Cody Ware	B. J. McLeod Motorsports	Chevrolet	88.248
33	35	Joey Gase	MBM Motorsports	Toyota	88.595
34	15	B. J. McLeod	JD Motorsports	Chevrolet	89.279
35	68	Brandon Brown (R)	Brandonbilt Motorsports	Chevrolet	90.307
36	5	Vinnie Miller	B. J. McLeod Motorsports	Chevrolet	91.827
37	13	Chad Finchum	MBM Motorsports	Toyota	92.212
38	38	Bayley Currey (i)	RSS Racing	Chevrolet	0.000

. – Playoffs driver

== Race ==
=== Summary ===
Chase Briscoe started on pole and maintained his lead, winning Stage 1. Cole Custer overtook teammate Briscoe at the conclusion of Stage 1, and won Stage 2, which did not see any cautions. Alex Labbé notably won points in both stages and also had a career-best finish of 6th.

On lap 45, a caution occurred and four playoff drivers, including Brandon Jones and John Hunter Nemechek, were involved. Afterwards, Briscoe attempted to overtake Christopher Bell for second place. Briscoe drove hard into Bell, running him off the track. Bell was obligated to serve a penalty due to going off-track, but instead chased Briscoe down and deliberately spun him. Bell was ruled by NASCAR to have to restart at the rear of the field. Briscoe suffered as his team spent a long time repairing his car. Neither driver was able to fully recover from the incident, though Bell was already locked into the next round of the playoffs from his win at the previous week's race.

For the other playoffs drivers, Ryan Sieg dealt with fuel pressure issues early in the race, finishing two laps down. Justin Haley experienced mechanical issues and went to the garage for repairs, finishing six laps down.

A. J. Allmendinger had a strong run on the final restart, winning the race with a 2-second lead over Tyler Reddick.

Nemechek, Jones, Sieg, and Haley all exited the race below the cut line for the playoffs.

=== Stage Results ===
Stage One Laps: 20

Pos	No	Driver	Team	Manufacturer	Points
1	98	Chase Briscoe (R)	Stewart-Haas Racing with Biagi-DenBeste	Ford	10
2	22	Austin Cindric	Team Penske	Ford	9
3	7	Justin Allgaier	JR Motorsports	Chevrolet	8
4	90	Alex Labbé	DGM Racing	Chevrolet	7
5	51	Jeremy Clements	Jeremy Clements Racing	Chevrolet	6
6	23	John Hunter Nemechek (R)	GMS Racing	Chevrolet	5
7	8	Ryan Truex	JR Motorsports	Chevrolet	4
8	19	Brandon Jones	Joe Gibbs Racing	Toyota	3
9	9	Noah Gragson (R)	JR Motorsports	Chevrolet	2
10	00	Cole Custer	Stewart-Haas Racing with Biagi-DenBeste	Ford	1

Stage Two Laps: 20

Pos	No	Driver	Team	Manufacturer	Points
1	00	Cole Custer	Stewart-Haas Racing with Biagi-DenBeste	Ford	10
2	98	Chase Briscoe (R)	Stewart-Haas Racing with Biagi-DenBeste	Ford	9
3	2	Tyler Reddick	Richard Childress Racing	Chevrolet	8
4	7	Justin Allgaier	JR Motorsports	Chevrolet	7
5	9	Noah Gragson (R)	JR Motorsports	Chevrolet	6
6	19	Brandon Jones	Joe Gibbs Racing	Toyota	5
7	90	Alex Labbé	DGM Racing	Chevrolet	4
8	20	Christopher Bell	Joe Gibbs Racing	Toyota	3
9	22	Austin Cindric	Team Penske	Ford	2
10	51	Jeremy Clements	Jeremy Clements Racing	Chevrolet	1

=== Final Stage Results ===
Stage Three Laps: 27

Pos	Grid	No	Driver	Team	Manufacturer	Laps	Points
1	5	10	A. J. Allmendinger	Kaulig Racing	Chevrolet	67	40
2	2	2	Tyler Reddick	Richard Childress Racing	Chevrolet	67	43
3	3	22	Austin Cindric	Team Penske	Ford	67	45
4	7	7	Justin Allgaier	JR Motorsports	Chevrolet	67	48
5	12	9	Noah Gragson (R)	JR Motorsports	Chevrolet	67	40
6	6	90	Alex Labbé	DGM Racing	Chevrolet	67	42
7	14	23	John Hunter Nemechek (R)	GMS Racing	Chevrolet	67	35
8	4	00	Cole Custer	Stewart-Haas Racing with Biagi-DenBeste	Ford	67	40
9	1	98	Chase Briscoe (R)	Stewart-Haas Racing with Biagi-DenBeste	Ford	67	47
10	13	8	Ryan Truex	JR Motorsports	Chevrolet	67	31
11	8	51	Jeremy Clements	Jeremy Clements Racing	Chevrolet	67	33
12	11	20	Christopher Bell	Joe Gibbs Racing	Toyota	67	28
13	22	18	Harrison Burton (i)	Joe Gibbs Racing	Toyota	67	0
14	19	0	Lawson Aschenbach	JD Motorsports	Chevrolet	67	23
15	23	1	Michael Annett	JR Motorsports	Chevrolet	67	22
16	15	19	Brandon Jones	Joe Gibbs Racing	Toyota	67	29
17	35	68	Brandon Brown (R)	Brandonbilt Motorsports	Chevrolet	67	20
18	21	66	Timmy Hill	MBM Motorsports	Toyota	67	19
19	26	01	Stephen Leicht	JD Motorsports	Chevrolet	67	18
20	20	36	Josh Williams	DGM Racing	Chevrolet	67	17
21	33	35	Joey Gase	MBM Motorsports	Toyota	67	16
22	30	74	Joe Nemechek (i)	Mike Harmon Racing	Chevrolet	67	0
23	34	15	B. J. McLeod	JD Motorsports	Chevrolet	67	14
24	32	99	Cody Ware	B. J. McLeod Motorsports	Chevrolet	67	13
25	36	5	Vinnie Miller	B. J. McLeod Motorsports	Chevrolet	67	12
26	28	93	Josh Bilicki	RSS Racing	Chevrolet	67	11
27	16	43	Preston Pardus	Pardus Racing Inc.	Chevrolet	67	10
28	10	86	Will Rodgers	Brandonbilt Motorsports	Chevrolet	67	9
29	17	08	Gray Gaulding (R)	SS-Green Light Racing	Chevrolet	67	8
30	25	39	Ryan Sieg	RSS Racing	Chevrolet	65	7
31	9	11	Justin Haley (R)	Kaulig Racing	Chevrolet	61	6
32	24	07	Ray Black Jr.	SS-Green Light Racing	Chevrolet	60	5
33	27	4	Garrett Smithley	JD Motorsports	Chevrolet	54	4
34	31	52	David Starr	Jimmy Means Racing	Chevrolet	28	3
35	18	61	Tommy Joe Martins	MBM Motorsports	Toyota	26	2
36	37	13	Chad Finchum	MBM Motorsports	Toyota	26	1
37	38	38	Bayley Currey (i)	RSS Racing	Chevrolet	10	0
38	29	78	J. J. Yeley	B. J. McLeod Motorsports	Toyota	5	1

. – Playoffs driver

- During the race, Stefan Parsons, replaced Cody Ware who was not feeling well after the coolbox of his car didn't work during the race so he felt the heat exhaustion. Since Ware started the race, he is officially credited with the 24th-place finish.

Previous race: 2019 Go Bowling 250	NASCAR Xfinity Series; 2019 season	Next race: 2019 Use Your Melon Drive Sober 200
