= 2019 Alsco 300 (Bristol) =

Race details
- Race 7 of 33 in the 2019 NASCAR Xfinity Series season
- Date: April 6, 2019
- Location: Bristol Motor Speedway in Bristol, Tennessee
- Course: Permanent racing facility
- Course length: 0.533 miles (0.858 km)
- Distance: 300 laps, 159.9 mi (257.3 km)

Pole position
Driver	Cole Custer	Stewart-Haas Racing
- Time: 15.168

Most laps led
Driver	Justin Allgaier	JR Motorsports
- Laps: 136

Winner
No. 20	Christopher Bell	Joe Gibbs Racing

Television in the United States
- Network: FS1

Radio in the United States
- Radio: MRN

The 2019 Alsco 300 is a NASCAR Xfinity Series race held on April 6, 2019, at Bristol Motor Speedway in Bristol, Tennessee. Contested over 300 laps on the 0.533 miles (0.858 km) concrete short track, it was the seventh race of the 2019 NASCAR Xfinity Series season. This was also the season's first Dash 4 Cash race, which would award extra money to the race winner.

== Background ==
=== Track ===
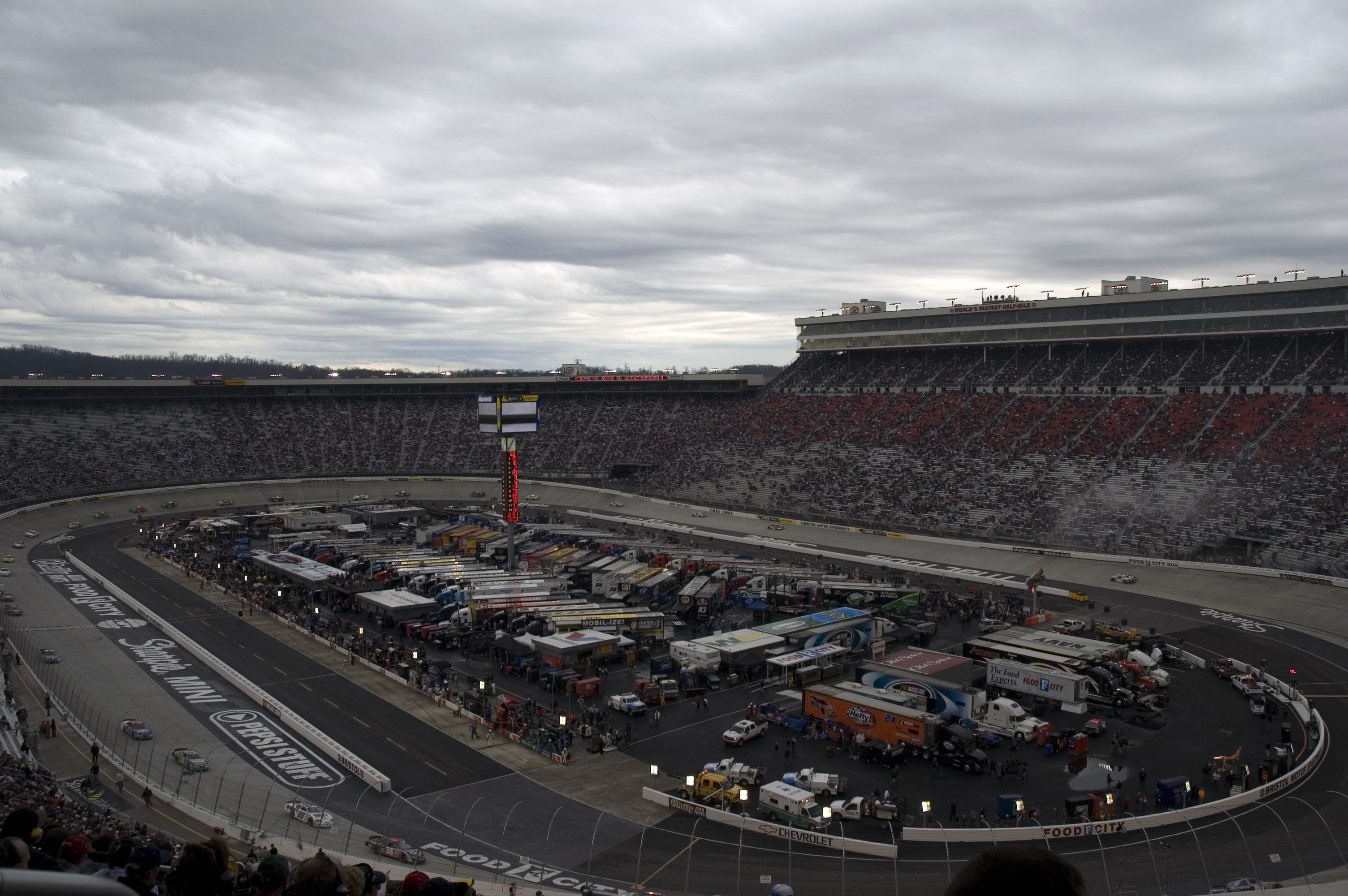
Bristol Motor Speedway, the track where the race was held.

Bristol Motor Speedway, formerly known as Bristol International Raceway and Bristol Raceway, is a NASCAR short track venue located in Bristol, Tennessee. Constructed in 1960, it held its first NASCAR race on July 30, 1961. Despite its short length, Bristol is among the most popular tracks on the NASCAR schedule because of its distinct features, which include steep banking, an all concrete surface, two pit roads, and stadium-like seating.

=== Dash 4 Cash ===
The Dash 4 Cash is a series of races in the NASCAR Xfinity Series. The 2019 format included four races where only the top four points eligible drivers in the previous race could be eligible to win a $100,000 bonus on top of their race winnings if they won the race. In addition, Cup Series regulars were not permitted to compete in the races.

For this race, Michael Annett, Christopher Bell, Chase Briscoe and Tyler Reddick were eligible for Dash 4 Cash as they placed in the top four in the 2019 My Bariatric Solutions 300 amongst regular season drivers. The highest-finishing Dash 4 Cash eligible driver at Bristol would receive the bonus and move on to have a shot at the prize at the next race, along with the top three finishing series regulars from this race. This format continued for the two races afterwards at Talladega and Dover.

== Entry list ==
No.	Driver	Team	Manufacturer	Sponsor
00	Cole Custer	Stewart-Haas Racing with Biagi-DenBeste Racing	Ford	Haas Automation
0	Garrett Smithley	JD Motorsports	Chevrolet	Food City / JD Motorsports
01	Stephen Leicht	JD Motorsports	Chevrolet	Food City / JD Motorsports
1	Michael Annett	JR Motorsports	Chevrolet	Pilot / Flying J
2	Tyler Reddick	Richard Childress Racing	Chevrolet	Dolly Parton
4	Ross Chastain	JD Motorsports	Chevrolet	Food City / JD Motorsports
5	Matt Mills (R)	B. J. McLeod Motorsports	Chevrolet	J.F. Electric
07	Ray Black Jr.	SS-Green Light Racing	Chevrolet	Isokern Fireplaces & Chimneys / Scuba Life
7	Justin Allgaier	JR Motorsports	Chevrolet	Armour Vienna Sausage
08	Gray Gaulding (R)	SS-Green Light Racing	Chevrolet	Panini Trading Cards
8	Zane Smith	JR Motorsports	Chevrolet	The Cosmopolitan of Las Vegas
9	Noah Gragson (R)	JR Motorsports	Chevrolet	Switch
11	Justin Haley (R)	Kaulig Racing	Chevrolet	Leaf Filter Gutter Protection
13	John Jackson	MBM Motorsports	Toyota	Street Toys / CrashClaimsR.us
15	B. J. McLeod	JD Motorsports	Chevrolet	Food City / JD Motorsports
17	Kyle Weatherman (i)	Rick Ware Racing	Chevrolet	East Carolina University
18	Harrison Burton (i)	Joe Gibbs Racing	Toyota	DEX Imaging
19	Brandon Jones	Joe Gibbs Racing	Toyota	Menards / Jeld-Wen
20	Christopher Bell	Joe Gibbs Racing	Toyota	Rheem
22	Austin Cindric	Team Penske	Ford	MoneyLion
23	John Hunter Nemechek (R)	GMS Racing	Chevrolet	Allegiant
35	Joey Gase	MBM Motorsports	Toyota	Richie Anderson 1962-2019
36	Josh Williams	DGM Racing	Chevrolet	Peg Leg Porker / Venture Wipes
38	Jeff Green	RSS Racing	Chevrolet	RSS Racing
39	Ryan Sieg	RSS Racing	Chevrolet	Shop
42	Chad Finchum	MBM Motorsports	Toyota	Amana
51	Jeremy Clements	Jeremy Clements Racing	Chevrolet	All South Electric
52	David Starr	Jimmy Means Racing	Chevrolet	Chasco / Shoun Trucking
66	Timmy Hill	MBM Motorsports	Toyota	CrashClaimsR.us / Richie Anderson 1962-2019
74	Mike Harmon	Mike Harmon Racing	Chevrolet	Woobies Shoes
78	Vinnie Miller	B. J. McLeod Motorsports	Chevrolet	Koolbox
86	Brandon Brown (R)	Brandonbilt Motorsports	Chevrolet	Brandonbilt Motorsports
89	Morgan Shepherd	Shepherd Racing Ventures	Chevrolet	Visone RV
90	Alex Labbé	DGM Racing	Chevrolet	Auto Credit National / Auto-National.com
93	Josh Bilicki	RSS Racing	Chevrolet	RSS Racing
98	Chase Briscoe (R)	Stewart-Haas Racing with Biagi-DenBeste Racing	Ford	Nutri Chomps
99	Tommy Joe Martins	B. J. McLeod Motorsports	Toyota	Diamond Gusset Jeans / AAN Adjusters

== Practice ==
=== First practice ===
John Hunter Nemechek was the fastest in the first practice session with a time of 15.632 seconds and a speed of 122.748 mph (197.544 km/h).

Pos	No.	Driver	Team	Manufacturer	Time	Speed
1	23	John Hunter Nemechek (R)	GMS Racing	Chevrolet	15.632	122.748
2	00	Cole Custer	Stewart-Haas Racing with Biagi-DenBeste Racing	Ford	15.760	121.751
3	7	Justin Allgaier	JR Motorsports	Chevrolet	15.808	121.382

=== Final practice ===
Cole Custer was the fastest in the final practice session with a time of 15.509 seconds and a speed of 123.722 mph (199.111 km/h).

Pos	No.	Driver	Team	Manufacturer	Time	Speed
1	00	Cole Custer	Stewart-Haas Racing with Biagi-DenBeste Racing	Ford	15.509	123.722
2	7	Justin Allgaier	JR Motorsports	Chevrolet	15.561	123.308
3	11	Justin Haley (R)	Kaulig Racing	Chevrolet	15.576	123.190

== Qualifying ==
Cole Custer scored the pole for the race with a time of 15.168 seconds and a speed of 126.503 mph (203.587 km/h).

=== Qualifying results ===
Pos	No	Driver	Team	Manufacturer	Time
1	00	Cole Custer	Stewart-Haas Racing with Biagi-DenBeste Racing	Ford	15.168
2	2	Tyler Reddick	Richard Childress Racing	Chevrolet	15.255
3	98	Chase Briscoe (R)	Stewart-Haas Racing with Biagi-DenBeste Racing	Ford	15.261
4	22	Austin Cindric	Team Penske	Ford	15.264
5	18	Harrison Burton (i)	Joe Gibbs Racing	Toyota	15.276
6	7	Justin Allgaier	JR Motorsports	Chevrolet	15.302
7	9	Noah Gragson (R)	JR Motorsports	Chevrolet	15.377
8	20	Christopher Bell	Joe Gibbs Racing	Toyota	15.382
9	1	Michael Annett	JR Motorsports	Chevrolet	15.397
10	23	John Hunter Nemechek (R)	GMS Racing	Chevrolet	15.404
11	11	Justin Haley (R)	Kaulig Racing	Chevrolet	15.438
12	4	Ross Chastain	JD Motorsports	Chevrolet	15.447
13	19	Brandon Jones	Joe Gibbs Racing	Toyota	15.490
14	39	Ryan Sieg	RSS Racing	Chevrolet	15.493
15	51	Jeremy Clements	Jeremy Clements Racing	Chevrolet	15.557
16	8	Zane Smith	JR Motorsports	Chevrolet	15.566
17	90	Alex Labbé	DGM Racing	Chevrolet	15.605
18	42	Chad Finchum	MBM Motorsports	Toyota	15.618
19	08	Gray Gaulding (R)	SS-Green Light Racing	Chevrolet	15.669
20	66	Timmy Hill	MBM Motorsports	Toyota	15.732
21	07	Ray Black Jr.	SS-Green Light Racing	Chevrolet	15.737
22	86	Brandon Brown (R)	Brandonbilt Motorsports	Chevrolet	15.738
23	15	B. J. McLeod	JD Motorsports	Chevrolet	15.885
24	17	Kyle Weatherman (i)	Rick Ware Racing	Chevrolet	15.916
25	36	Josh Williams	DGM Racing	Chevrolet	15.919
26	0	Garrett Smithley	JD Motorsports	Chevrolet	15.942
27	35	Joey Gase	MBM Motorsports	Toyota	16.010
28	99	Tommy Joe Martins	B. J. McLeod Motorsports	Toyota	16.017
29	93	Josh Bilicki	RSS Racing	Chevrolet	16.074
30	78	Vinnie Miller	B. J. McLeod Motorsports	Chevrolet	16.144
31	5	Matt Mills (R)	B. J. McLeod Motorsports	Chevrolet	16.188
32	52	David Starr	Jimmy Means Racing	Chevrolet	16.749
33	89	Morgan Shepherd	Shepherd Racing Ventures	Chevrolet	16.834
34	74	Mike Harmon	Mike Harmon Racing	Chevrolet	17.076
35	13	John Jackson	MBM Motorsports	Toyota	17.268
36	01	Stephen Leicht	JD Motorsports	Chevrolet	0.000
37	38	Jeff Green	RSS Racing	Chevrolet	0.000

. – Eligible for Dash 4 Cash prize money

== Race ==
=== Summary ===
Cole Custer began on pole, but Justin Allgaier overtook him and would dominate the first two stages and lead the most laps. In Stage 1, Jeff Green got loose under Ross Chastain, causing heavy damage and eliminating both cars. Allgaier would later suffer from mechanical problems and crash out of the race despite his early dominance.

A caution with 40 laps to go occurred after Harrison Burton cut a tire in his first Xfinity series race. Brandon Jones stayed out and assumed the lead. Christopher Bell, sporting newer tires, passed Jones with 17 laps to go and battled with Tyler Reddick. In the end, Bell would win the race and extra prize money after holding off Reddick, who would finish second for the second consecutive race.

At the next race, Bell, Reddick, Custer, and Briscoe would have the chance at the extra prize money for placing in the top 4 for this race.

=== Stage Results ===
Stage One Laps: 85

Pos	No	Driver	Team	Manufacturer	Points
1	7	Justin Allgaier	JR Motorsports	Chevrolet	10
2	2	Tyler Reddick	Richard Childress Racing	Chevrolet	9
3	00	Cole Custer	Stewart-Haas Racing with Biagi-DenBeste	Ford	8
4	18	Harrison Burton (i)	Joe Gibbs Racing	Toyota	0
5	22	Austin Cindric	Team Penske	Ford	6
6	98	Chase Briscoe (R)	Stewart-Haas Racing with Biagi-DenBeste	Ford	5
7	20	Christopher Bell	Joe Gibbs Racing	Toyota	4
8	11	Justin Haley (R)	Kaulig Racing	Chevrolet	3
9	23	John Hunter Nemechek (R)	GMS Racing	Chevrolet	2
10	19	Brandon Jones	Joe Gibbs Racing	Toyota	1

Stage Two Laps: 85

Pos	No	Driver	Team	Manufacturer	Points
1	7	Justin Allgaier	JR Motorsports	Chevrolet	10
2	2	Tyler Reddick	Richard Childress Racing	Chevrolet	9
3	20	Christopher Bell	Joe Gibbs Racing	Toyota	8
4	00	Cole Custer	Stewart-Haas Racing with Biagi-DenBeste	Ford	7
5	23	John Hunter Nemechek (R)	GMS Racing	Chevrolet	6
6	22	Austin Cindric	Team Penske	Ford	5
7	98	Chase Briscoe (R)	Stewart-Haas Racing with Biagi-DenBeste	Ford	4
8	18	Harrison Burton (i)	Joe Gibbs Racing	Toyota	0
9	19	Brandon Jones	Joe Gibbs Racing	Toyota	2
10	11	Justin Haley (R)	Kaulig Racing	Chevrolet	1

=== Final Stage Results ===
Stage Three Laps: 130

Pos	Grid	No	Driver	Team	Manufacturer	Laps	Points
1	8	20	Christopher Bell	Joe Gibbs Racing	Toyota	300	52
2	2	2	Tyler Reddick	Richard Childress Racing	Chevrolet	300	53
3	1	00	Cole Custer	Stewart-Haas Racing with Biagi-DenBeste	Ford	300	49
4	3	98	Chase Briscoe (R)	Stewart-Haas Racing with Biagi-DenBeste	Ford	300	42
5	10	23	John Hunter Nemechek (R)	GMS Racing	Chevrolet	300	40
6	4	22	Austin Cindric	Team Penske	Ford	300	42
7	11	11	Justin Haley (R)	Kaulig Racing	Chevrolet	300	34
8	9	1	Michael Annett	JR Motorsports	Chevrolet	300	29
9	7	9	Noah Gragson (R)	JR Motorsports	Chevrolet	300	28
10	5	18	Harrison Burton (i)	Joe Gibbs Racing	Toyota	300	0
11	16	8	Zane Smith	JR Motorsports	Chevrolet	300	26
12	14	39	Ryan Sieg	RSS Racing	Chevrolet	299	25
13	15	51	Jeremy Clements	Jeremy Clements Racing	Chevrolet	299	24
14	13	19	Brandon Jones	Joe Gibbs Racing	Toyota	298	26
15	19	08	Gray Gaulding	SS-Green Light Racing	Chevrolet	297	22
16	21	07	Ray Black Jr.	SS-Green Light Racing	Chevrolet	296	21
17	20	66	Timmy Hill	MBM Motorsports	Toyota	294	20
18	23	15	B. J. McLeod	JD Motorsports	Chevrolet	294	19
19	25	36	Josh Williams	DGM Racing	Chevrolet	293	18
20	18	42	Chad Finchum	MBM Motorsports	Toyota	292	17
21	31	5	Matt Mills (R)	B. J. McLeod Motorsports	Chevrolet	292	16
22	26	0	Garrett Smithley	JD Motorsports	Chevrolet	292	15
23	22	86	Brandon Brown (R)	Brandonbilt Motorsports	Chevrolet	291	14
24	30	78	Vinnie Miller	B. J. McLeod Motorsports	Chevrolet	291	13
25	32	52	David Starr	Jimmy Means Racing	Chevrolet	289	12
26	28	99	Tommy Joe Martins	B. J. McLeod Motorsports	Toyota	288	11
27	27	35	Joey Gase	MBM Motorsports	Toyota	286	10
28	24	17	Kyle Weatherman (i)	Rick Ware Racing	Chevrolet	284	0
29	34	74	Mike Harmon	Mike Harmon Racing	Chevrolet	272	8
30	6	7	Justin Allgaier	JR Motorsports	Chevrolet	227	27
31	17	90	Alex Labbé	DGM Racing	Chevrolet	193	6
32	36	01	Stephen Leicht	JD Motorsports	Chevrolet	190	5
33	12	4	Ross Chastain	JD Motorsports	Chevrolet	41	4
34	37	38	Jeff Green	RSS Racing	Chevrolet	40	3
35	33	89	Morgan Shepherd	Shepherd Racing Ventures	Chevrolet	13	2
36	29	93	Josh Bilicki	RSS Racing	Chevrolet	12	1
37	35	13	John Jackson	MBM Motorsports	Toyota	9	1

. – Won the Dash 4 Cash prize money and subsequently qualified for the Dash 4 Cash prize money in the next race.

. – Qualified for Dash 4 Cash prize money in the next race.

Previous race: 2019 My Bariatric Solutions 300	NASCAR Xfinity Series; 2019 season	Next race: 2019 ToyotaCare 250
