= 2019 My Bariatric Solutions 300 =

Race details
- Race 6 of 33 in the 2019 NASCAR Xfinity Series season
- Date: March 30, 2019
- Location: Texas Motor Speedway in Fort Worth, Texas
- Course: Permanent racing facility
- Course length: 1.5 miles (2.4 km)
- Distance: 200 laps, 300 mi (480 km)

Pole position
Driver	Christopher Bell	Joe Gibbs Racing
- Time: 28.225

Most laps led
Driver	Christopher Bell	Joe Gibbs Racing
- Laps: 128

Winner
No. 18	Kyle Busch	Joe Gibbs Racing

Television in the United States
- Network: FS1

Radio in the United States
- Radio: MRN

The 2019 My Bariatric Solutions 300 was a NASCAR Xfinity Series race held on March 30, 2019, at Texas Motor Speedway in Fort Worth, Texas. Contested over 200 laps on the 1.5-mile (2.4 km) intermediate quad-oval, it was the sixth race of the 2019 NASCAR Xfinity Series season.

== Background ==
=== Track ===
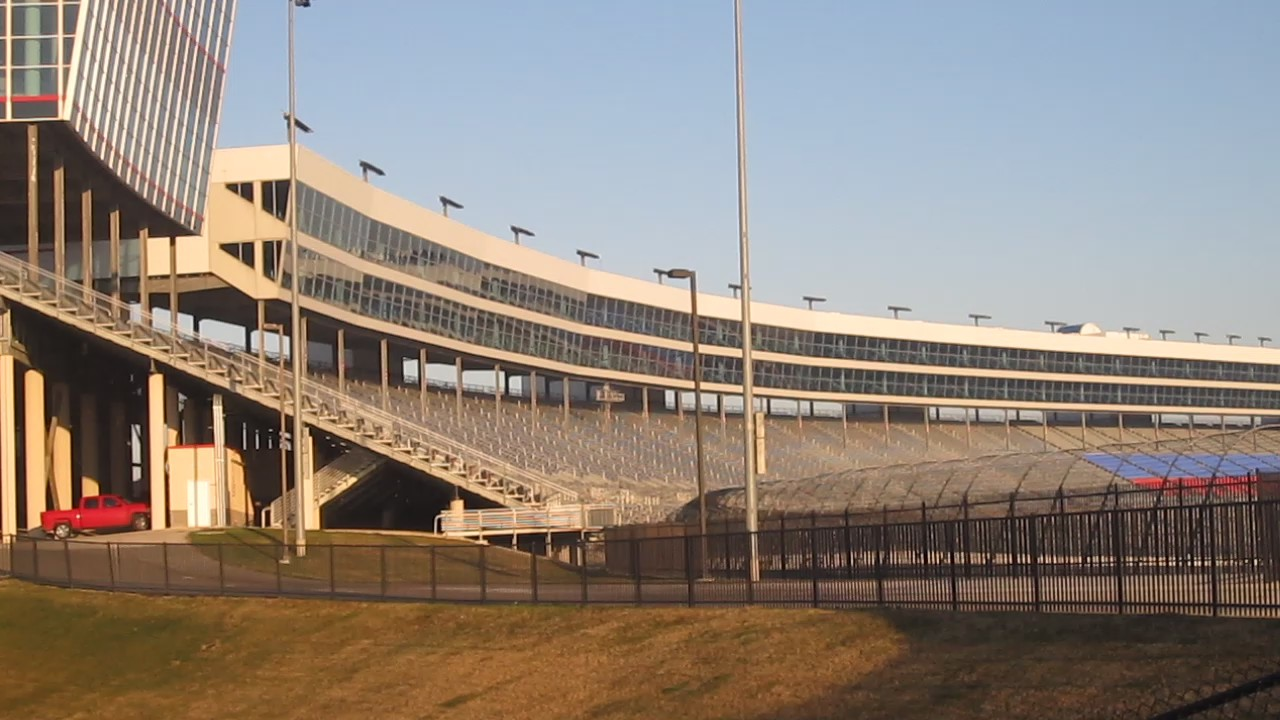
Texas Motor Speedway, the track where the race was held.

Texas Motor Speedway is a speedway located in the northernmost portion of the U.S. city of Fort Worth, Texas – the portion located in Denton County, Texas. The reconfigured track measures 1.44 miles (2.32 km) with banked 20° in turns 1 and 2 and banked 24° in turns 3 and 4. Texas Motor Speedway is a quad-oval design, where the front straightaway juts outward slightly. The track layout is similar to Atlanta Motor Speedway and Charlotte Motor Speedway.

== Entry list ==
No.	Driver	Team	Manufacturer
00	Cole Custer	Stewart-Haas Racing with Biagi-DenBeste Racing	Ford
0	Garrett Smithley	JD Motorsports	Chevrolet
01	Stephen Leicht	JD Motorsports	Chevrolet
1	Michael Annett	JR Motorsports	Chevrolet
2	Tyler Reddick	Richard Childress Racing	Chevrolet
4	Ross Chastain	JD Motorsports	Chevrolet
5	Matt Mills (R)	B. J. McLeod Motorsports	Chevrolet
07	Ray Black Jr.	SS-Green Light Racing	Chevrolet
7	Justin Allgaier	JR Motorsports	Chevrolet
08	Gray Gaulding (R)	SS-Green Light Racing	Chevrolet
8	Jeb Burton	JR Motorsports	Chevrolet
9	Noah Gragson (R)	JR Motorsports	Chevrolet
11	Justin Haley (R)	Kaulig Racing	Chevrolet
12	Brad Keselowski (i)	Team Penske	Ford
13	Timmy Hill	MBM Motorsports	Toyota
15	B. J. McLeod	JD Motorsports	Chevrolet
17	Bayley Currey (i)	Rick Ware Racing	Chevrolet
18	Kyle Busch (i)	Joe Gibbs Racing	Toyota
19	Brandon Jones	Joe Gibbs Racing	Toyota
20	Christopher Bell	Joe Gibbs Racing	Toyota
21	Kaz Grala	Richard Childress Racing	Chevrolet
22	Austin Cindric	Team Penske	Ford
23	John Hunter Nemechek (R)	GMS Racing	Chevrolet
35	Joey Gase	MBM Motorsports	Toyota
36	Josh Williams	DGM Racing	Chevrolet
38	Jeff Green	RSS Racing	Chevrolet
39	Ryan Sieg	RSS Racing	Chevrolet
42	Chad Finchum	MBM Motorsports	Toyota
51	Jeremy Clements	Jeremy Clements Racing	Chevrolet
52	David Starr	Jimmy Means Racing	Chevrolet
66	Tyler Hill (i)	MBM Motorsports	Toyota
74	Mike Harmon	Mike Harmon Racing	Chevrolet
78	Vinnie Miller	B. J. McLeod Motorsports	Chevrolet
81	Jeffrey Earnhardt	XCI Racing	Toyota
86	Brandon Brown (R)	Brandonbilt Motorsports	Chevrolet
89	Morgan Shepherd	Shepherd Racing Ventures	Chevrolet
90	Ronnie Bassett Jr.	DGM Racing	Chevrolet
93	Josh Bilicki	RSS Racing	Chevrolet
98	Chase Briscoe (R)	Stewart-Haas Racing with Biagi-DenBeste Racing	Ford
99	Tommy Joe Martins	B. J. McLeod Motorsports	Toyota

== Practice ==
=== First practice ===
Tyler Reddick was the fastest in the first practice session with a time of 28.822 seconds and a speed of 187.357 mph (301.522 km/h).

Pos	No.	Driver	Team	Manufacturer	Time	Speed
1	2	Tyler Reddick	Richard Childress Racing	Chevrolet	28.822	187.357
2	18	Kyle Busch (i)	Joe Gibbs Racing	Toyota	28.870	187.045
3	21	Kaz Grala	Richard Childress Racing	Chevrolet	28.903	186.832

=== Final practice ===
Kyle Busch was the fastest in the final practice session with a time of 28.752 seconds and a speed of 187.813 mph (302.256 km/h).

Pos	No.	Driver	Team	Manufacturer	Time	Speed
1	18	Kyle Busch (i)	Joe Gibbs Racing	Toyota	28.752	187.813
2	12	Brad Keselowski (i)	Team Penske	Ford	28.895	186.884
3	2	Tyler Reddick	Richard Childress Racing	Chevrolet	28.895	186.884

== Qualifying ==
Christopher Bell scored the pole for the race with a time of 28.225 seconds and a speed of 191.320 mph (307.900 km/h).

=== Qualifying results ===
Pos	No	Driver	Team	Manufacturer	R1	R2
1	20	Christopher Bell	Joe Gibbs Racing	Toyota	28.607	28.225
2	19	Brandon Jones	Joe Gibbs Racing	Toyota	28.448	28.277
3	2	Tyler Reddick	Richard Childress Racing	Chevrolet	28.571	28.322
4	7	Justin Allgaier	JR Motorsports	Chevrolet	28.469	28.338
5	18	Kyle Busch (i)	Joe Gibbs Racing	Toyota	28.473	28.389
6	8	Jeb Burton	JR Motorsports	Chevrolet	28.621	28.460
7	00	Cole Custer	Stewart-Haas Racing with Biagi-DenBeste Racing	Ford	28.667	28.483
8	23	John Hunter Nemechek (R)	GMS Racing	Chevrolet	28.551	28.487
9	22	Austin Cindric	Team Penske	Ford	28.510	28.618
10	12	Brad Keselowski (i)	Team Penske	Ford	28.552	28.649
11	11	Justin Haley (R)	Kaulig Racing	Chevrolet	28.667	28.655
12	21	Kaz Grala	Richard Childress Racing	Chevrolet	28.565	28.685
13	1	Michael Annett	JR Motorsports	Chevrolet	28.677	—
14	81	Jeffrey Earnhardt	XCI Racing	Toyota	28.694	—
15	98	Chase Briscoe (R)	Stewart-Haas Racing with Biagi-DenBeste Racing	Ford	28.745	—
16	9	Noah Gragson (R)	JR Motorsports	Chevrolet	28.748	—
17	51	Jeremy Clements	Jeremy Clements Racing	Chevrolet	28.766	—
18	4	Ross Chastain	JD Motorsports	Chevrolet	28.839	—
19	39	Ryan Sieg	RSS Racing	Chevrolet	29.089	—
20	08	Gray Gaulding (R)	SS-Green Light Racing	Chevrolet	29.182	—
21	86	Brandon Brown (R)	Brandonbilt Motorsports	Chevrolet	29.188	—
22	36	Josh Williams	DGM Racing	Chevrolet	29.189	—
23	90	Ronnie Bassett Jr.	DGM Racing	Chevrolet	29.275	—
24	99	Tommy Joe Martins	B. J. McLeod Motorsports	Toyota	29.444	—
25	07	Ray Black Jr.	SS-Green Light Racing	Chevrolet	29.459	—
26	93	Josh Bilicki	RSS Racing	Chevrolet	29.557	—
27	38	Jeff Green	RSS Racing	Chevrolet	29.630	—
28	15	B. J. McLeod	JD Motorsports	Chevrolet	29.790	—
29	5	Matt Mills (R)	B. J. McLeod Motorsports	Chevrolet	30.027	—
30	01	Stephen Leicht	JD Motorsports	Chevrolet	30.105	—
31	52	David Starr	Jimmy Means Racing	Chevrolet	30.160	—
32	13	Timmy Hill	MBM Motorsports	Toyota	30.173	—
33	66	Tyler Hill (i)	MBM Motorsports	Toyota	30.233	—
34	78	Vinnie Miller	B. J. McLeod Motorsports	Chevrolet	30.401	—
35	42	Chad Finchum	MBM Motorsports	Toyota	30.734	—
36	74	Mike Harmon	Mike Harmon Racing	Chevrolet	31.182	—
37	35	Joey Gase	MBM Motorsports	Toyota	31.249	—
38	0	Garrett Smithley	JD Motorsports	Chevrolet	0.000	—
Did not qualify
39	89	Morgan Shepherd	Shepherd Racing Ventures	Chevrolet	32.469	—
40	17	Bayley Currey (i)	Rick Ware Racing	Chevrolet	0.000	—

- Garrett Smithley and Tommy Joe Martins started at the rear for unapproved adjustments to their cars after qualifying.
- Gray Gaulding, Timmy Hill, Josh Williams, Jeff Green, and Ronnie Bassett, Jr. were sent to the back of the field for missing the drivers meeting.

== Race ==
=== Summary ===
Christopher Bell led the field to the green flag, and would remain as the race leader until after Stage 1. Kyle Busch then took the lead from Bell while Tyler Hill and David Starr were involved in a minor accident. Both would continue the race. Busch lost the lead when a caution occurred after Brad Keselowski was tapped by Justin Haley and crashed into the wall. Noah Gragson took the lead afterwards, but Ryan Sieg took it under a caution caused by Ray Black Jr. Sieg would win Stage 2 afterwards. Tyler Reddick and Bell would later trade the lead while Brandon Jones and Cole Custer got into a crash and took each other out of the race. Busch took the lead from Bell with 9 laps to go and held off Reddick to earn his third victory in the series for the year.

=== Stage Results ===
Stage One Laps: 45

Pos	No	Driver	Team	Manufacturer	Points
1	20	Christopher Bell	Joe Gibbs Racing	Toyota	10
2	18	Kyle Busch (i)	Joe Gibbs Racing	Toyota	0
3	7	Justin Allgaier	JR Motorsports	Chevrolet	8
4	00	Cole Custer	Stewart-Haas Racing with Biagi-DenBeste	Ford	7
5	19	Brandon Jones	Joe Gibbs Racing	Toyota	6
6	2	Tyler Reddick	Richard Childress Racing	Chevrolet	5
7	22	Austin Cindric	Team Penske	Ford	4
8	12	Brad Keselowski (i)	Team Penske	Ford	0
9	23	John Hunter Nemechek (R)	GMS Racing	Chevrolet	2
10	9	Noah Gragson (R)	JR Motorsports	Chevrolet	1

Stage Two Laps: 45

Pos	No	Driver	Team	Manufacturer	Points
1	39	Ryan Sieg	RSS Racing	Chevrolet	10
2	4	Ross Chastain	JD Motorsports	Chevrolet	9
3	2	Tyler Reddick	Richard Childress Racing	Chevrolet	8
4	18	Kyle Busch (i)	Joe Gibbs Racing	Toyota	0
5	20	Christopher Bell	Joe Gibbs Racing	Toyota	6
6	9	Noah Gragson (R)	JR Motorsports	Chevrolet	5
7	8	Jeb Burton	JR Motorsports	Chevrolet	4
8	00	Cole Custer	Stewart-Haas Racing with Biagi-DenBeste	Ford	3
9	11	Justin Haley (R)	Kaulig Racing	Chevrolet	2
10	19	Brandon Jones	Joe Gibbs Racing	Toyota	1

=== Final Stage Results ===
Stage Three Laps: 110

Pos	Grid	No	Driver	Team	Manufacturer	Laps	Points
1	5	18	Kyle Busch (i)	Joe Gibbs Racing	Toyota	200	0
2	3	2	Tyler Reddick	Richard Childress Racing	Chevrolet	200	48
3	1	20	Christopher Bell	Joe Gibbs Racing	Toyota	200	50
4	15	98	Chase Briscoe (R)	Stewart-Haas Racing with Biagi-DenBeste	Ford	200	33
5	6	8	Jeb Burton	JR Motorsports	Chevrolet	200	36
6	13	1	Michael Annett	JR Motorsports	Chevrolet	200	31
7	11	11	Justin Haley (R)	Kaulig Racing	Chevrolet	200	32
8	14	81	Jeffrey Earnhardt	XCI Racing	Toyota	200	29
9	8	23	John Hunter Nemechek (R)	GMS Racing	Chevrolet	200	30
10	19	39	Ryan Sieg	RSS Racing	Chevrolet	200	37
11	9	22	Austin Cindric	Team Penske	Ford	200	30
12	4	7	Justin Allgaier	JR Motorsports	Chevrolet	200	33
13	16	9	Noah Gragson (R)	JR Motorsports	Chevrolet	200	30
14	22	36	Josh Williams	DGM Racing	Chevrolet	200	23
15	23	90	Ronnie Bassett Jr.	DGM Racing	Chevrolet	199	22
16	18	4	Ross Chastain	JD Motorsports	Chevrolet	199	30
17	21	86	Brandon Brown (R)	Brandonbilt Motorsports	Chevrolet	199	20
18	12	21	Kaz Grala	Richard Childress Racing	Chevrolet	198	19
19	24	99	Tommy Joe Martins	B. J. McLeod Motorsports	Chevrolet	198	18
20	31	52	David Starr	Jimmy Means Racing	Chevrolet	198	17
21	20	08	Gray Gaulding	SS-Green Light Racing	Chevrolet	198	16
22	30	01	Stephen Leicht	JD Motorsports	Chevrolet	198	15
23	35	42	Chad Finchum	MBM Motorsports	Toyota	197	14
24	37	35	Joey Gase	MBM Motorsports	Toyota	196	13
25	34	78	Vinnie Miller	B. J. McLeod Motorsports	Chevrolet	196	12
26	17	51	Jeremy Clements	Jeremy Clements Racing	Chevrolet	196	11
27	29	5	Matt Mills (R)	B. J. McLeod Motorsports	Chevrolet	194	10
28	33	66	Tyler Hill (i)	MBM Motorsports	Toyota	191	0
29	36	74	Mike Harmon	Mike Harmon Racing	Chevrolet	189	8
30	26	93	Josh Bilicki	RSS Racing	Chevrolet	184	7
31	38	0	Garrett Smithley	JD Motorsports	Chevrolet	160	6
32	28	15	B. J. McLeod	JD Motorsports	Chevrolet	138	5
33	2	19	Brandon Jones	Joe Gibbs Racing	Toyota	133	11
34	7	00	Cole Custer	Stewart-Haas Racing with Biagi-DenBeste	Ford	132	13
35	25	07	Ray Black Jr.	SS-Green Light Racing	Chevrolet	79	2
36	10	12	Brad Keselowski (i)	Team Penske	Ford	68	0
37	32	13	Timmy Hill	MBM Motorsports	Toyota	20	1
38	27	38	Jeff Green	RSS Racing	Chevrolet	16	1

. – Qualified for Dash 4 Cash prize money in the next race.

Previous race: 2019 Production Alliance Group 300	NASCAR Xfinity Series; 2019 season	Next race: 2019 Alsco 300
