= 2019 Allied Steel Buildings 200 =

Race details
- Race 10 of 33 in the 2019 NASCAR Xfinity Series season
- Date: May 4, 2019
- Location: Dover International Speedway in Dover, Delaware
- Course: Permanent racing facility
- Course length: 1 miles (1.6 km)
- Distance: 200 laps, 200 mi (321 km)

Pole position
| Driver | Cole Custer | Stewart-Haas Racing with Biagi-DenBeste Racing |
- Time: 22.882

Most laps led
| Driver | Cole Custer | Stewart-Haas Racing with Biagi-DenBeste Racing |
- Laps: 156

Winner
| No. 20 | Christopher Bell | Joe Gibbs Racing |

Television in the United States
- Network: FS1

Radio in the United States
- Radio: MRN

The 2019 Allied Steel Buildings 200 was a NASCAR Xfinity Series race held on May 4, 2019, at Dover International Speedway in Dover, Delaware. Contested over 200 laps on the 1-mile (1.6 km) concrete speedway, it was the 10th race of the 2019 NASCAR Xfinity Series season. This was the season's fourth and final Dash 4 Cash race.

== Background ==
=== Track ===
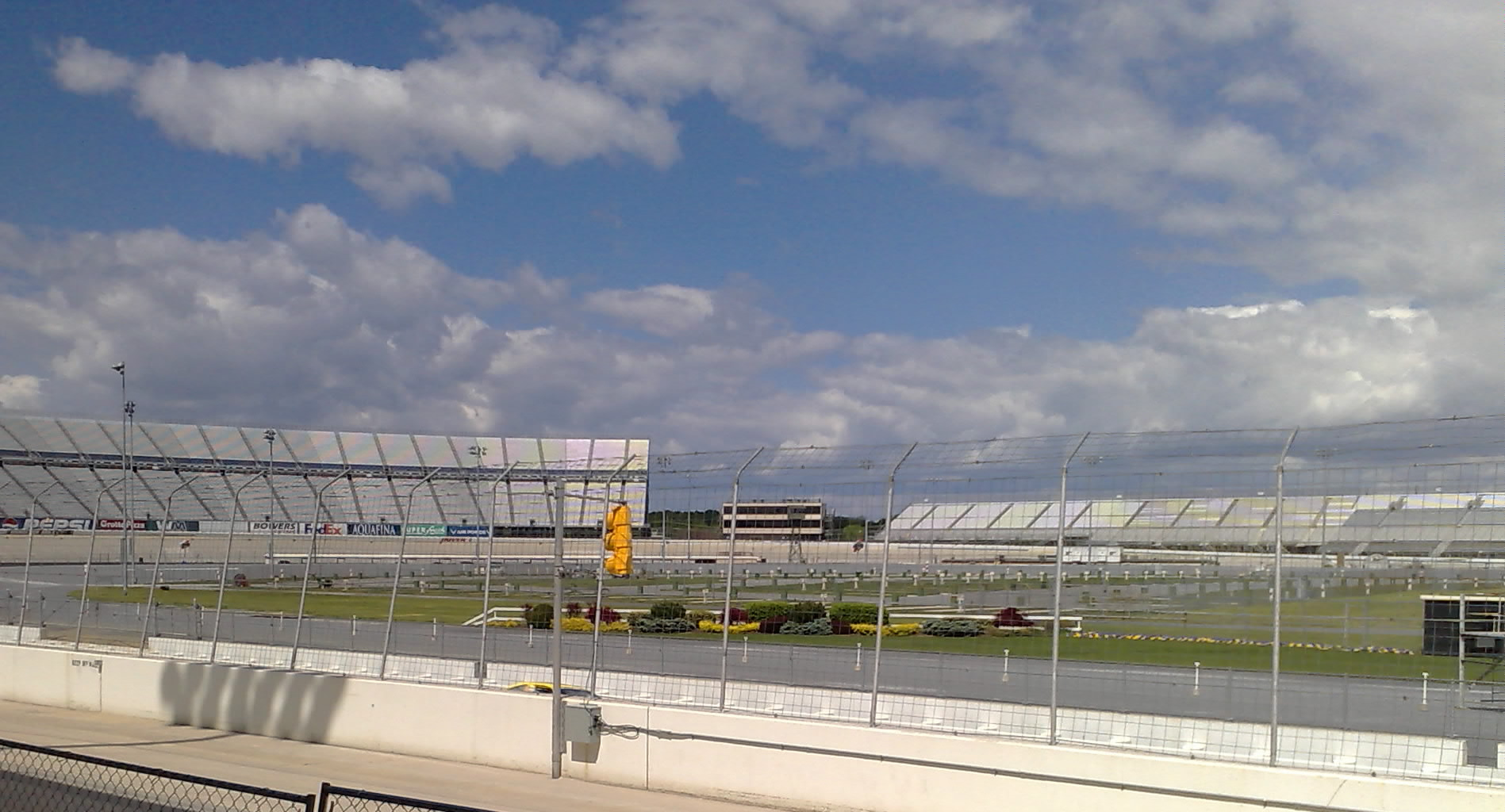
Dover International Speedway, the track where the race was held.

Dover International Speedway is an oval race track in Dover, Delaware, United States that has held at least two NASCAR races since it opened in 1969. In addition to NASCAR, the track also hosted USAC and the NTT IndyCar Series. The track features one layout, a 1 mile (1.6 km) concrete oval, with 24° banking in the turns and 9° banking on the straights. The speedway is owned and operated by Dover Motorsports.

=== Dash 4 Cash ===
For the final Dash 4 Cash race, Tyler Reddick, Gray Gaulding, Christopher Bell, and Chase Briscoe had qualified for prize eligibility at the previous race.

== Entry list ==
| No. | Driver | Team | Manufacturer |
|---|---|---|---|
| 00 | Cole Custer | Stewart-Haas Racing with Biagi-DenBeste Racing | Ford |
| 0 | Garrett Smithley | JD Motorsports | Chevrolet |
| 01 | Stephen Leicht | JD Motorsports | Chevrolet |
| 1 | Michael Annett | JR Motorsports | Chevrolet |
| 2 | Tyler Reddick | Richard Childress Racing | Chevrolet |
| 4 | Ross Chastain | JD Motorsports | Chevrolet |
| 5 | Matt Mills (R) | B. J. McLeod Motorsports | Chevrolet |
| 07 | Ray Black Jr. | SS-Green Light Racing | Chevrolet |
| 7 | Justin Allgaier | JR Motorsports | Chevrolet |
| 08 | Gray Gaulding (R) | SS-Green Light Racing | Chevrolet |
| 8 | Zane Smith | JR Motorsports | Chevrolet |
| 9 | Noah Gragson (R) | JR Motorsports | Chevrolet |
| 11 | Justin Haley (R) | Kaulig Racing | Chevrolet |
| 13 | John Jackson | MBM Motorsports | Toyota |
| 15 | B. J. McLeod | JD Motorsports | Chevrolet |
| 17 | Bayley Currey (i) | Rick Ware Racing | Chevrolet |
| 18 | Riley Herbst | Joe Gibbs Racing | Toyota |
| 19 | Brandon Jones | Joe Gibbs Racing | Toyota |
| 20 | Christopher Bell | Joe Gibbs Racing | Toyota |
| 21 | Kaz Grala | Richard Childress Racing | Chevrolet |
| 22 | Austin Cindric | Team Penske | Ford |
| 23 | John Hunter Nemechek (R) | GMS Racing | Chevrolet |
| 35 | Joey Gase | MBM Motorsports | Toyota |
| 36 | Josh Williams | DGM Racing | Chevrolet |
| 38 | Jeff Green | RSS Racing | Chevrolet |
| 39 | Ryan Sieg | RSS Racing | Chevrolet |
| 42 | Chad Finchum | MBM Motorsports | Toyota |
| 51 | Jeremy Clements | Jeremy Clements Racing | Chevrolet |
| 52 | David Starr | Jimmy Means Racing | Chevrolet |
| 66 | Timmy Hill | MBM Motorsports | Toyota |
| 74 | Mike Harmon | Mike Harmon Racing | Chevrolet |
| 78 | Vinnie Miller | B. J. McLeod Motorsports | Chevrolet |
| 86 | Brandon Brown (R) | Brandonbilt Motorsports | Chevrolet |
| 89 | Morgan Shepherd | Shepherd Racing Ventures | Chevrolet |
| 90 | Ronnie Bassett Jr. | DGM Racing | Chevrolet |
| 93 | Josh Bilicki | RSS Racing | Chevrolet |
| 98 | Chase Briscoe (R) | Stewart-Haas Racing with Biagi-DenBeste Racing | Ford |
| 99 | Tommy Joe Martins | B. J. McLeod Motorsports | Toyota |

== Practice ==
=== First practice ===
Tyler Reddick was the fastest in the first practice session with a time of 23.089 seconds and a speed of 155.918 mph (250.926 km/h).

| Pos | No. | Driver | Team | Manufacturer | Time | Speed |
|---|---|---|---|---|---|---|
| 1 | 2 | Tyler Reddick | Richard Childress Racing | Chevrolet | 23.089 | 155.918 |
| 2 | 00 | Cole Custer | Stewart-Haas Racing with Biagi-DenBeste Racing | Ford | 23.289 | 154.579 |
| 3 | 21 | Kaz Grala | Richard Childress Racing | Chevrolet | 23.295 | 154.540 |

=== Final practice ===
Austin Cindric was the fastest in the final practice session with a time of 23.568 seconds and a speed of 152.749 mph (245.826 km/h).

| Pos | No. | Driver | Team | Manufacturer | Time | Speed |
|---|---|---|---|---|---|---|
| 1 | 22 | Austin Cindric | Team Penske | Ford | 23.568 | 152.749 |
| 2 | 18 | Riley Herbst | Joe Gibbs Racing | Toyota | 23.576 | 152.698 |
| 3 | 11 | Justin Haley (R) | Kaulig Racing | Chevrolet | 23.582 | 152.659 |

== Qualifying ==
Cole Custer scored the pole for the race with a time of 22.882 seconds and a speed of 157.329 mph (253.196 km/h).

=== Qualifying results ===
| Pos | No | Driver | Team | Manufacturer | Time |
|---|---|---|---|---|---|
| 1 | 00 | Cole Custer | Stewart-Haas Racing with Biagi-DenBeste Racing | Ford | 22.882 |
| 2 | 7 | Justin Allgaier | JR Motorsports | Chevrolet | 22.898 |
| 3 | 22 | Austin Cindric | Team Penske | Ford | 22.922 |
| 4 | 20 | Christopher Bell | Joe Gibbs Racing | Toyota | 22.923 |
| 5 | 2 | Tyler Reddick | Richard Childress Racing | Chevrolet | 22.925 |
| 6 | 8 | Zane Smith | JR Motorsports | Chevrolet | 23.009 |
| 7 | 98 | Chase Briscoe (R) | Stewart-Haas Racing with Biagi-DenBeste Racing | Ford | 23.020 |
| 8 | 19 | Brandon Jones | Joe Gibbs Racing | Toyota | 23.053 |
| 9 | 9 | Noah Gragson (R) | JR Motorsports | Chevrolet | 23.060 |
| 10 | 4 | Ross Chastain | JD Motorsports | Chevrolet | 23.066 |
| 11 | 11 | Justin Haley (R) | Kaulig Racing | Chevrolet | 23.104 |
| 12 | 18 | Riley Herbst | Joe Gibbs Racing | Toyota | 23.128 |
| 13 | 51 | Jeremy Clements | Jeremy Clements Racing | Chevrolet | 23.167 |
| 14 | 39 | Ryan Sieg | RSS Racing | Chevrolet | 23.213 |
| 15 | 1 | Michael Annett | JR Motorsports | Chevrolet | 23.227 |
| 16 | 23 | John Hunter Nemechek (R) | GMS Racing | Chevrolet | 23.257 |
| 17 | 86 | Brandon Brown (R) | Brandonbilt Motorsports | Chevrolet | 23.357 |
| 18 | 21 | Kaz Grala | Richard Childress Racing | Chevrolet | 23.384 |
| 19 | 66 | Timmy Hill | MBM Motorsports | Toyota | 23.424 |
| 20 | 15 | B. J. McLeod | JD Motorsports | Chevrolet | 23.515 |
| 21 | 08 | Gray Gaulding (R) | SS-Green Light Racing | Chevrolet | 23.542 |
| 22 | 07 | Ray Black Jr. | SS-Green Light Racing | Chevrolet | 23.579 |
| 23 | 01 | Stephen Leicht | JD Motorsports | Chevrolet | 23.701 |
| 24 | 99 | Tommy Joe Martins | B. J. McLeod Motorsports | Toyota | 23.717 |
| 25 | 90 | Ronnie Bassett Jr. | DGM Racing | Chevrolet | 23.740 |
| 26 | 0 | Garrett Smithley | JD Motorsports | Chevrolet | 23.801 |
| 27 | 42 | Chad Finchum | MBM Motorsports | Toyota | 23.880 |
| 28 | 17 | Bayley Currey (i) | Rick Ware Racing | Chevrolet | 23.893 |
| 29 | 38 | Jeff Green | RSS Racing | Chevrolet | 23.979 |
| 30 | 93 | Josh Bilicki | RSS Racing | Chevrolet | 24.080 |
| 31 | 78 | Vinnie Miller | B. J. McLeod Motorsports | Chevrolet | 24.156 |
| 32 | 36 | Josh Williams | DGM Racing | Chevrolet | 24.189 |
| 33 | 52 | David Starr | Jimmy Means Racing | Chevrolet | 24.207 |
| 34 | 89 | Morgan Shepherd | Shepherd Racing Ventures | Chevrolet | 24.272 |
| 35 | 5 | Matt Mills (R) | B. J. McLeod Motorsports | Chevrolet | 24.396 |
| 36 | 35 | Joey Gase | MBM Motorsports | Toyota | 24.431 |
| 37 | 74 | Mike Harmon | Mike Harmon Racing | Chevrolet | 24.705 |
| 38 | 13 | John Jackson | MBM Motorsports | Toyota | 25.009 |

. – Eligible for Dash 4 Cash prize money

== Race ==
=== Summary ===
Cole Custer started on the pole and dominated the two stages, leading the first 156 laps. Kaz Grala spun after a bump by John Hunter Nemechek with 47 laps to go, causing a caution. Custer lost the race on pit road to Christopher Bell, and was unable to retake the lead due to dirty air. After restarting on the bottom lane, Custer was overtaken by Tyler Reddick and struggled to recover.

Riley Herbst spun and brought out the next caution. On the restart, Bell pulled away while Reddick and Justin Allgaier nearly wrecked battling for second place. The final caution occurred when Gray Gaulding spun out shortly afterwards, also collecting Vinnie Miller. Bell managed to pull away on the restart and held off Allgaier to win the race and Dash 4 Cash prize money.

=== Stage Results ===
Stage One Laps: 60

| Pos | No | Driver | Team | Manufacturer | Points |
|---|---|---|---|---|---|
| 1 | 00 | Cole Custer | Stewart-Haas Racing with Biagi-DenBeste | Ford | 10 |
| 2 | 20 | Christopher Bell | Joe Gibbs Racing | Toyota | 9 |
| 3 | 7 | Justin Allgaier | JR Motorsports | Chevrolet | 8 |
| 4 | 2 | Tyler Reddick | Richard Childress Racing | Chevrolet | 7 |
| 5 | 22 | Austin Cindric | Team Penske | Ford | 6 |
| 6 | 8 | Zane Smith | JR Motorsports | Chevrolet | 5 |
| 7 | 98 | Chase Briscoe (R) | Stewart-Haas Racing with Biagi-DenBeste | Ford | 4 |
| 8 | 19 | Brandon Jones | Joe Gibbs Racing | Toyota | 3 |
| 9 | 4 | Ross Chastain | JD Motorsports | Chevrolet | 2 |
| 10 | 11 | Justin Haley (R) | Kaulig Racing | Chevrolet | 1 |

Stage Two Laps: 60

| Pos | No | Driver | Team | Manufacturer | Points |
|---|---|---|---|---|---|
| 1 | 00 | Cole Custer | Stewart-Haas Racing with Biagi-DenBeste | Ford | 10 |
| 2 | 20 | Christopher Bell | Joe Gibbs Racing | Toyota | 9 |
| 3 | 2 | Tyler Reddick | Richard Childress Racing | Chevrolet | 8 |
| 4 | 7 | Justin Allgaier | JR Motorsports | Chevrolet | 7 |
| 5 | 8 | Zane Smith | JR Motorsports | Chevrolet | 6 |
| 6 | 22 | Austin Cindric | Team Penske | Ford | 5 |
| 7 | 98 | Chase Briscoe (R) | Stewart-Haas Racing with Biagi-DenBeste | Ford | 4 |
| 8 | 19 | Brandon Jones | Joe Gibbs Racing | Toyota | 3 |
| 9 | 9 | Noah Gragson (R) | JR Motorsports | Chevrolet | 2 |
| 10 | 23 | John Hunter Nemechek (R) | GMS Racing | Chevrolet | 1 |

=== Final Stage Results ===
Stage Three Laps: 80

| Pos | Grid | No | Driver | Team | Manufacturer | Laps | Points |
|---|---|---|---|---|---|---|---|
| 1 | 4 | 20 | Christopher Bell | Joe Gibbs Racing | Toyota | 200 | 58 |
| 2 | 2 | 7 | Justin Allgaier | JR Motorsports | Chevrolet | 200 | 50 |
| 3 | 5 | 2 | Tyler Reddick | Richard Childress Racing | Chevrolet | 200 | 49 |
| 4 | 1 | 00 | Cole Custer | Stewart-Haas Racing with Biagi-DenBeste | Ford | 200 | 53 |
| 5 | 7 | 98 | Chase Briscoe (R) | Stewart-Haas Racing with Biagi-DenBeste | Ford | 200 | 40 |
| 6 | 3 | 22 | Austin Cindric | Team Penske | Ford | 200 | 42 |
| 7 | 8 | 19 | Brandon Jones | Joe Gibbs Racing | Toyota | 200 | 36 |
| 8 | 16 | 23 | John Hunter Nemechek (R) | GMS Racing | Chevrolet | 200 | 30 |
| 9 | 6 | 8 | Zane Smith | JR Motorsports | Chevrolet | 200 | 39 |
| 10 | 15 | 1 | Michael Annett | JR Motorsports | Chevrolet | 200 | 27 |
| 11 | 14 | 39 | Ryan Sieg | RSS Racing | Chevrolet | 200 | 26 |
| 12 | 10 | 4 | Ross Chastain | JD Motorsports | Chevrolet | 200 | 27 |
| 13 | 17 | 86 | Brandon Brown | Brandonbilt Motorsports | Chevrolet | 200 | 24 |
| 14 | 18 | 21 | Kaz Grala | Richard Childress Racing | Chevrolet | 199 | 23 |
| 15 | 12 | 18 | Riley Herbst | Joe Gibbs Racing | Toyota | 199 | 22 |
| 16 | 19 | 66 | Timmy Hill | MBM Motorsports | Toyota | 199 | 21 |
| 17 | 11 | 11 | Justin Haley (R) | Kaulig Racing | Chevrolet | 198 | 21 |
| 18 | 13 | 51 | Jeremy Clements | Jeremy Clements Racing | Chevrolet | 198 | 19 |
| 19 | 9 | 9 | Noah Gragson (R) | JR Motorsports | Chevrolet | 197 | 20 |
| 20 | 21 | 08 | Gray Gaulding | SS-Green Light Racing | Chevrolet | 197 | 17 |
| 21 | 24 | 99 | Tommy Joe Martins | B. J. McLeod Motorsports | Chevrolet | 197 | 16 |
| 22 | 32 | 36 | Josh Williams (R) | DGM Racing | Chevrolet | 196 | 15 |
| 23 | 26 | 0 | Garrett Smithley | JD Motorsports | Chevrolet | 196 | 14 |
| 24 | 22 | 07 | Ray Black Jr. | SS-Green Light Racing | Chevrolet | 196 | 13 |
| 25 | 25 | 90 | Ronnie Bassett Jr. | DGM Racing | Chevrolet | 196 | 12 |
| 26 | 23 | 01 | Stephen Leicht (R) | JD Motorsports | Chevrolet | 196 | 11 |
| 27 | 20 | 15 | B. J. McLeod | JD Motorsports | Chevrolet | 196 | 10 |
| 28 | 33 | 52 | David Starr | Jimmy Means Racing | Chevrolet | 195 | 9 |
| 29 | 36 | 35 | Joey Gase | MBM Motorsports | Toyota | 195 | 8 |
| 30 | 27 | 42 | Chad Finchum | MBM Motorsports | Toyota | 195 | 7 |
| 31 | 35 | 5 | Matt Mills (R) | B. J. McLeod Motorsports | Chevrolet | 195 | 6 |
| 32 | 31 | 78 | Vinnie Miller | B. J. McLeod Motorsports | Chevrolet | 194 | 5 |
| 33 | 37 | 74 | Mike Harmon | Mike Harmon Racing | Chevrolet | 144 | 4 |
| 34 | 28 | 17 | Bayley Currey (i) | Rick Ware Racing | Chevrolet | 59 | 0 |
| 35 | 34 | 89 | Morgan Shepherd | Shepherd Racing Ventures | Chevrolet | 50 | 2 |
| 36 | 29 | 38 | Jeff Green | RSS Racing | Chevrolet | 15 | 1 |
| 37 | 38 | 13 | John Jackson | MBM Motorsports | Toyota | 13 | 1 |
| 38 | 30 | 93 | Josh Bilicki | RSS Racing | Chevrolet | 10 | 1 |

. – Won the Dash 4 Cash prize money

| Previous race: 2019 MoneyLion 300 | NASCAR Xfinity Series; 2019 season | Next race: 2019 Alsco 300 (Charlotte) |
