= 2018 Sparks Energy 300 =

Ninth race of the 2018 NASCAR Xfinity Series

Race details
- Race 9 of 33 of the 2018 NASCAR Xfinity Series
- Date: April 28, 2018
- Official name: 27th Annual Sparks Energy 300
- Location: Lincoln, Alabama, Talladega Superspeedway
- Course: Permanent racing facility
- Course length: 2.66 miles (4.28 km)
- Distance: 115 laps, 305.9 mi (492.298 km)
- Scheduled distance: 113 laps, 300.58 mi (483.736 km)
- Average speed: 133.258 miles per hour (214.458 km/h)

Pole position
Driver	Daniel Hemric	Richard Childress Racing
- Time: 50.559

Most laps led
Driver	Daniel Hemric	Richard Childress Racing
- Laps: 39

Winner
No. 23	Spencer Gallagher	GMS Racing

Television in the United States
- Network: FOX
- Announcers: Kevin Harvick, Clint Bowyer, Joey Logano

Radio in the United States
- Radio: Motor Racing Network

The 2018 Sparks Energy 300 was the ninth stock car race of the 2018 NASCAR Xfinity Series season, and the 27th iteration of the event. The race was held on Saturday, April 28, 2018, in Lincoln, Alabama at Talladega Superspeedway, a 2.66 miles (4.28 km) permanent triangle-shaped superspeedway. The race was extended from the scheduled 113 laps to 115 due to a NASCAR overtime finish. At race's end, Spencer Gallagher of GMS Racing would make a last lap pass on Tyler Reddick and fend off the field to win a shocker, winning his first and so far final NASCAR Xfinity Series win of his career and his first and only win of the season. To fill out the podium, Brandon Jones of Joe Gibbs Racing and Justin Allgaier of JR Motorsports would finish second and third, respectively.

== Background ==
Talladega Superspeedway, originally known as Alabama International Motor Superspeedway (AIMS), is a motorsports complex located north of Talladega, Alabama. It is located on the former Anniston Air Force Base in the small city of Lincoln. The track is a tri-oval and was constructed in the 1960s by the International Speedway Corporation, a business controlled by the France family. Talladega is most known for its steep banking and the unique location of the start/finish line that's located just past the exit to pit road. The track currently hosts the NASCAR series such as the NASCAR Cup Series, Xfinity Series and the Camping World Truck Series. Talladega is the longest NASCAR oval with a length of 2.66-mile-long (4.28 km) tri-oval like the Daytona International Speedway, which also is a 2.5-mile-long (4 km) tri-oval.

=== Entry list ===
#	Driver	Team	Make	Sponsor
0	Garrett Smithley	JD Motorsports	Chevrolet	FAME USA
00	Cole Custer	Stewart-Haas Racing with Biagi-DenBeste	Ford	Haas Automation
1	Elliott Sadler	JR Motorsports	Chevrolet	OneMain Financial "Lending Done Human"
01	Vinnie Miller	JD Motorsports	Chevrolet	JAS Expedited Trucking
2	Matt Tifft	Richard Childress Racing	Chevrolet	KC Motorgroup
3	Shane Lee	Richard Childress Racing	Chevrolet	Childress Vineyards
4	Ross Chastain	JD Motorsports	Chevrolet	Flex Seal
5	Michael Annett	JR Motorsports	Chevrolet	Pilot Flying J
7	Justin Allgaier	JR Motorsports	Chevrolet	TradeMark Nitrogen
8	Tommy Joe Martins	B. J. McLeod Motorsports	Chevrolet	B. J. McLeod Motorsports
9	Tyler Reddick	JR Motorsports	Chevrolet	Armour Chili
11	Ryan Truex	Kaulig Racing	Chevrolet	Bar Harbor
15	Joe Nemechek	JD Motorsports	Chevrolet	Fleetwing
16	Ryan Reed	Roush Fenway Racing	Ford	DriveDownA1C.com
18	Noah Gragson	Joe Gibbs Racing	Toyota	Switch "Motivated By Invention. Driven By Perfection."
19	Brandon Jones	Joe Gibbs Racing	Toyota	XYO Network
20	Christopher Bell	Joe Gibbs Racing	Toyota	Rheem
21	Daniel Hemric	Richard Childress Racing	Chevrolet	South Point Hotel, Casino & Spa
22	Austin Cindric	Team Penske	Ford	Fitzgerald Glider Kits
23	Spencer Gallagher	GMS Racing	Chevrolet	Allegiant Air
24	Kaz Grala	JGL Racing	Ford	Nettts
28	Dylan Lupton	JGL Racing	Ford	ThinQ Technology Partners
35	Joey Gase	Go Green Racing with SS-Green Light Racing	Chevrolet	Sparks Energy, Donate Life Alabama
36	Alex Labbé	DGM Racing	Chevrolet	Wholey's, Can-Am
38	J. J. Yeley	RSS Racing	Chevrolet	Josh Roberts Trucking
39	Ryan Sieg	RSS Racing	Chevrolet	Alabama Soda & Abrasive Blasting
40	Chad Finchum	MBM Motorsports	Toyota	Smithbilt Homes
42	John Hunter Nemechek	Chip Ganassi Racing	Chevrolet	Fire Alarm Services
45	Josh Bilicki	JP Motorsports	Toyota	Prevagen
51	Jeremy Clements	Jeremy Clements Racing	Chevrolet	RepairableVehicles.com
52	David Starr	Jimmy Means Racing	Chevrolet	Whataburger
54	?*	NXT Motorsports	Toyota	VS1 Racing
55	Jennifer Jo Cobb	JP Motorsports	Toyota	Jani-King "The King of Clean", Swampdaddy Crawfish
60	Ty Majeski	Roush Fenway Racing	Ford	Ford
66	Timmy Hill	MBM Motorsports	Toyota	CrashClaimsR.Us, VS1 Racing
74	Mike Harmon	Mike Harmon Racing	Dodge	Shadow Warriors Project, Horizon Transport
76	Spencer Boyd	SS-Green Light Racing	Chevrolet	Grunt Style "This We'll Defend"
78	B. J. McLeod	B. J. McLeod Motorsports	Chevrolet	B. J. McLeod Motorsports
89	Morgan Shepherd	Shepherd Racing Ventures	Chevrolet	Visone RV
90	Josh Williams	DGM Racing	Chevrolet	Sleep Well Sleep Disorder Specialists, StarTron
93	Jeff Green	RSS Racing	Chevrolet	C2 Freight Resources
98	Chase Briscoe	Stewart-Haas Racing with Biagi-DenBeste	Ford	Ford
Official entry list

== Practice ==
=== First practice ===
The first practice session would occur on Friday, April 27, at 10:35 AM EST, and would last for 50 minutes. Cole Custer of Stewart-Haas Racing with Biagi-DenBeste would set the fastest time in the session, with a time of 49.329 and an average speed of 194.125 miles per hour (312.414 km/h).

Pos.	#	Driver	Team	Make	Time	Speed
1	00	Cole Custer	Stewart-Haas Racing with Biagi-DenBeste	Ford	49.329	194.125
2	23	Spencer Gallagher	GMS Racing	Chevrolet	49.366	193.980
3	11	Ryan Truex	Kaulig Racing	Chevrolet	49.373	193.952
Full first practice results

=== Second and final practice ===
The second and final practice session, sometimes referred to as Happy Hour, would occur on Friday, April 27, at 12:35 PM EST, and would last for 50 minutes. Shane Lee of Richard Childress Racing would set the fastest time in the session, with a time of 50.953 and an average speed of 187.938 miles per hour (302.457 km/h).

Pos.	#	Driver	Team	Make	Time	Speed
1	3	Shane Lee	Richard Childress Racing	Chevrolet	50.953	187.938
2	11	Ryan Truex	Kaulig Racing	Chevrolet	51.389	186.343
3	16	Ryan Reed	Roush Fenway Racing	Ford	51.443	186.148
Full Happy Hour practice results

== Qualifying ==
Qualifying would occur on Saturday, April 28, at 10:00 AM EST. Since Talladega Superspeedway at least 2 miles (3.2 km), the qualifying system was a single car, single lap, two round system where in the first round, everyone would set a time to determine positions 13-40. Then, the fastest 12 qualifiers would move on to the second round to determine positions 1-12.

Daniel Hemric of Richard Childress Racing would win the pole, setting a time of 50.559 and an average speed of 189.402 miles per hour (304.813 km/h) in the second round.

One driver would fail to qualify: Morgan Shepherd.

Pos.	#	Driver	Team	Make	Time (R1)	Speed (R1)	Time (R2)	Speed (R2)
1	21	Daniel Hemric	Richard Childress Racing	Chevrolet	50.640	189.100	50.559	189.402
2	1	Elliott Sadler	JR Motorsports	Chevrolet	50.794	188.526	50.727	188.775
3	23	Spencer Gallagher	GMS Racing	Chevrolet	50.842	188.348	50.762	188.645
4	42	John Hunter Nemechek	Chip Ganassi Racing	Chevrolet	50.940	187.986	50.810	188.467
5	5	Michael Annett	JR Motorsports	Chevrolet	50.848	188.326	50.814	188.452
6	7	Justin Allgaier	JR Motorsports	Chevrolet	50.793	188.530	50.885	188.189
7	3	Shane Lee	Richard Childress Racing	Chevrolet	51.044	187.603	50.914	188.082
8	9	Tyler Reddick	JR Motorsports	Chevrolet	50.999	187.768	50.929	188.026
9	11	Ryan Truex	Kaulig Racing	Chevrolet	51.039	187.621	51.030	187.654
10	2	Matt Tifft	Richard Childress Racing	Chevrolet	51.033	187.643	51.106	187.375
11	22	Austin Cindric	Team Penske	Ford	50.959	187.916	51.123	187.313
12	00	Cole Custer	Stewart-Haas Racing with Biagi-DenBeste	Ford	51.260	186.812	51.322	186.587
Eliminated in Round 1
13	20	Christopher Bell	Joe Gibbs Racing	Toyota	51.283	186.729	—	—
14	60	Ty Majeski	Roush Fenway Racing	Ford	51.309	186.634	—	—
15	19	Brandon Jones	Joe Gibbs Racing	Toyota	51.322	186.587	—	—
16	98	Chase Briscoe	Stewart-Haas Racing with Biagi-DenBeste	Ford	51.341	186.518	—	—
17	28	Dylan Lupton	JGL Racing	Ford	51.411	186.264	—	—
18	35	Joey Gase	Go Green Racing with SS-Green Light Racing	Chevrolet	51.452	186.115	—	—
19	16	Ryan Reed	Roush Fenway Racing	Ford	51.549	185.765	—	—
20	18	Noah Gragson	Joe Gibbs Racing	Toyota	51.653	185.391	—	—
21	36	Alex Labbé	DGM Racing	Chevrolet	51.699	185.226	—	—
22	39	Ryan Sieg	RSS Racing	Chevrolet	51.733	185.104	—	—
23	15	Joe Nemechek	JD Motorsports	Chevrolet	51.752	185.036	—	—
24	51	Jeremy Clements	Jeremy Clements Racing	Chevrolet	51.844	184.708	—	—
25	01	Vinnie Miller	JD Motorsports	Chevrolet	51.946	184.345	—	—
26	4	Ross Chastain	JD Motorsports	Chevrolet	51.989	184.193	—	—
27	38	J. J. Yeley	RSS Racing	Chevrolet	52.002	184.147	—	—
28	8	Tommy Joe Martins	B. J. McLeod Motorsports	Toyota	52.036	184.026	—	—
29	78	B. J. McLeod	B. J. McLeod Motorsports	Toyota	52.090	183.836	—	—
30	76	Spencer Boyd	SS-Green Light Racing	Chevrolet	52.195	183.466	—	—
31	90	Josh Williams	DGM Racing	Chevrolet	52.216	183.392	—	—
32	45	Josh Bilicki	JP Motorsports	Toyota	52.276	183.182	—	—
33	24	Kaz Grala	JGL Racing	Ford	52.300	183.098	—	—
Qualified by owner's points
34	0	Garrett Smithley	JD Motorsports	Chevrolet	52.353	182.912	—	—
35	93	Jeff Green	RSS Racing	Chevrolet	52.359	182.891	—	—
36	40	Chad Finchum	MBM Motorsports	Toyota	52.619	181.987	—	—
37	52	David Starr	Jimmy Means Racing	Chevrolet	52.632	181.943	—	—
38	66	Timmy Hill	MBM Motorsports	Toyota	53.250	179.831	—	—
39	55	Jennifer Jo Cobb	JP Motorsports	Toyota	53.312	179.622	—	—
40	74	Mike Harmon	Mike Harmon Racing	Dodge	53.491	179.021	—	—
Failed to qualify or withdrew
41	89	Morgan Shepherd	Shepherd Racing Ventures	Chevrolet	52.504	182.386	—	—
WD	54	?	NXT Motorsports	Toyota	—	—	—	—
Official qualifying results
Official starting lineup

== Race results ==
Stage 1 Laps: 25

Pos.	#	Driver	Team	Make	Pts
1	21	Daniel Hemric	Richard Childress Racing	Chevrolet	10
2	7	Justin Allgaier	JR Motorsports	Chevrolet	9
3	11	Ryan Truex	Kaulig Racing	Chevrolet	8
4	19	Brandon Jones	Joe Gibbs Racing	Toyota	7
5	42	John Hunter Nemechek	Chip Ganassi Racing	Chevrolet	6
6	2	Matt Tifft	Richard Childress Racing	Chevrolet	5
7	00	Cole Custer	Stewart-Haas Racing with Biagi-DenBeste	Ford	4
8	1	Elliott Sadler	JR Motorsports	Chevrolet	3
9	3	Shane Lee	Richard Childress Racing	Chevrolet	2
10	9	Tyler Reddick	JR Motorsports	Chevrolet	1

Stage 2 Laps: 25

Pos.	#	Driver	Team	Make	Pts
1	1	Elliott Sadler	JR Motorsports	Chevrolet	10
2	23	Spencer Gallagher	GMS Racing	Chevrolet	9
3	16	Ryan Reed	Roush Fenway Racing	Ford	8
4	5	Michael Annett	JR Motorsports	Chevrolet	7
5	9	Tyler Reddick	JR Motorsports	Chevrolet	6
6	2	Matt Tifft	Richard Childress Racing	Chevrolet	5
7	00	Cole Custer	Stewart-Haas Racing with Biagi-DenBeste	Ford	4
8	7	Justin Allgaier	JR Motorsports	Chevrolet	3
9	35	Joey Gase	Go Green Racing with SS-Green Light Racing	Chevrolet	2
10	42	John Hunter Nemechek	Chip Ganassi Racing	Chevrolet	1

Stage 3 Laps: 65

Fin	St	#	Driver	Team	Make	Laps	Led	Status	Pts
1	3	23	Spencer Gallagher	GMS Racing	Chevrolet	115	1	running	49
2	15	19	Brandon Jones	Joe Gibbs Racing	Toyota	115	0	running	42
3	6	7	Justin Allgaier	JR Motorsports	Chevrolet	115	35	running	46
4	20	18	Noah Gragson	Joe Gibbs Racing	Toyota	115	0	running	0
5	2	1	Elliott Sadler	JR Motorsports	Chevrolet	115	30	running	45
6	22	39	Ryan Sieg	RSS Racing	Chevrolet	115	1	running	31
7	4	42	John Hunter Nemechek	Chip Ganassi Racing	Chevrolet	115	0	running	37
8	8	9	Tyler Reddick	JR Motorsports	Chevrolet	115	2	running	36
9	12	00	Cole Custer	Stewart-Haas Racing with Biagi-DenBeste	Ford	115	0	running	36
10	34	0	Garrett Smithley	JD Motorsports	Chevrolet	115	0	running	27
11	27	38	J. J. Yeley	RSS Racing	Chevrolet	115	0	running	26
12	13	20	Christopher Bell	Joe Gibbs Racing	Toyota	115	1	running	25
13	35	93	Jeff Green	RSS Racing	Chevrolet	115	1	running	24
14	5	5	Michael Annett	JR Motorsports	Chevrolet	115	0	running	30
15	7	3	Shane Lee	Richard Childress Racing	Chevrolet	115	0	running	24
16	16	98	Chase Briscoe	Stewart-Haas Racing with Biagi-DenBeste	Ford	115	0	running	21
17	25	01	Vinnie Miller	JD Motorsports	Chevrolet	115	0	running	20
18	28	8	Tommy Joe Martins	B. J. McLeod Motorsports	Toyota	115	0	running	19
19	29	78	B. J. McLeod	B. J. McLeod Motorsports	Toyota	115	0	running	18
20	33	24	Kaz Grala	JGL Racing	Ford	114	0	running	17
21	18	35	Joey Gase	Go Green Racing with SS-Green Light Racing	Chevrolet	114	0	running	18
22	19	16	Ryan Reed	Roush Fenway Racing	Ford	114	1	running	23
23	1	21	Daniel Hemric	Richard Childress Racing	Chevrolet	114	39	running	24
24	21	36	Alex Labbé	DGM Racing	Chevrolet	114	0	running	13
25	10	2	Matt Tifft	Richard Childress Racing	Chevrolet	114	0	running	22
26	31	90	Josh Williams	DGM Racing	Chevrolet	114	0	running	11
27	38	66	Timmy Hill	MBM Motorsports	Toyota	114	0	running	10
28	32	45	Josh Bilicki	JP Motorsports	Toyota	114	0	running	9
29	39	55	Jennifer Jo Cobb	JP Motorsports	Toyota	114	0	running	0
30	11	22	Austin Cindric	Team Penske	Ford	114	3	running	7
31	23	15	Joe Nemechek	JD Motorsports	Chevrolet	113	0	running	0
32	37	52	David Starr	Jimmy Means Racing	Chevrolet	112	0	running	5
33	40	74	Mike Harmon	Mike Harmon Racing	Dodge	112	1	running	4
34	26	4	Ross Chastain	JD Motorsports	Chevrolet	78	0	suspension	3
35	24	51	Jeremy Clements	Jeremy Clements Racing	Chevrolet	53	0	fuel pump	2
36	17	28	Dylan Lupton	JGL Racing	Ford	32	0	crash	1
37	14	60	Ty Majeski	Roush Fenway Racing	Ford	32	0	crash	1
38	9	11	Ryan Truex	Kaulig Racing	Chevrolet	32	0	crash	9
39	36	40	Chad Finchum	MBM Motorsports	Toyota	32	0	crash	1
40	30	76	Spencer Boyd	SS-Green Light Racing	Chevrolet	32	0	crash	1
Failed to qualify or withdrew
41		89	Morgan Shepherd	Shepherd Racing Ventures	Chevrolet				
WD		54	?	NXT Motorsports	Toyota				
Official race results

Previous race: 2018 ToyotaCare 250	NASCAR Xfinity Series; 2018 season	Next race: 2018 OneMain Financial 200
