= 2018 OneMain Financial 200 =

10th race of the 2018 NASCAR Xfinity Series

Race details
- Race 10 of 33 of the 2018 NASCAR Xfinity Series
- Date: May 5, 2018
- Official name: 37th Annual OneMain Financial 200
- Location: Dover, Delaware, Dover International Speedway
- Course: Permanent racing facility
- Course length: 1 miles (1.6 km)
- Distance: 200 laps, 200 mi (321.868 km)
- Scheduled distance: 200 laps, 200 mi (321.868 km)
- Average speed: 98.053 miles per hour (157.801 km/h)

Pole position
Driver	Brandon Jones	Joe Gibbs Racing
- Time: 23.102

Most laps led
Driver	Justin Allgaier	JR Motorsports
- Laps: 104

Winner
No. 7	Justin Allgaier	JR Motorsports

Television in the United States
- Network: Fox Sports 1
- Announcers: Adam Alexander, Michael Waltrip, Austin Dillon

Radio in the United States
- Radio: Motor Racing Network

The 2018 OneMain Financial 200 was the 10th stock car race of the 2018 NASCAR Xfinity Series season and the 37th iteration of the event. The race was held on Saturday, May 5, 2018, in Dover, Delaware at Dover International Speedway, a 1 mile (1.6 km) oval-shaped permanent racetrack. The race took the scheduled 200 laps to complete. At race's end, Justin Allgaier of JR Motorsports would hold off his teammate Elliott Sadler in the closing laps to win his sixth career NASCAR Xfinity Series win and his first of the season. Allgaier would also win an extra $100,000 for winning a Dash 4 Cash event. To fill out the podium, Daniel Hemric of Richard Childress Racing would finish third.

== Background ==
The layout of Dover International Speedway, the venue where the race was held.

Dover International Speedway is an oval race track in Dover, Delaware, United States that has held at least two NASCAR races since it opened in 1969. In addition to NASCAR, the track also hosted USAC and the NTT IndyCar Series. The track features one layout, a 1 mile (1.6 km) concrete oval, with 24° banking in the turns and 9° banking on the straights. The speedway is owned and operated by Dover Motorsports.

The track, nicknamed "The Monster Mile", was built in 1969 by Melvin Joseph of Melvin L. Joseph Construction Company, Inc., with an asphalt surface, but was replaced with concrete in 1995. Six years later in 2001, the track's capacity moved to 135,000 seats, making the track have the largest capacity of sports venue in the mid-Atlantic. In 2002, the name changed to Dover International Speedway from Dover Downs International Speedway after Dover Downs Gaming and Entertainment split, making Dover Motorsports. From 2007 to 2009, the speedway worked on an improvement project called "The Monster Makeover", which expanded facilities at the track and beautified the track. After the 2014 season, the track's capacity was reduced to 95,500 seats.

=== Entry list ===
#	Driver	Team	Make	Sponsor
0	Garrett Smithley	JD Motorsports	Chevrolet	Meding's Seafood, Stockley Tavern & Package Store
00	Cole Custer	Stewart-Haas Racing with Biagi-DenBeste	Ford	Haas Automation
1	Elliott Sadler	JR Motorsports	Chevrolet	OneMain Financial "Lending Done Human"
01	Vinnie Miller	JD Motorsports	Chevrolet	JD Motorsports
2	Matt Tifft	Richard Childress Racing	Chevrolet	Nexteer
3	Jeb Burton	Richard Childress Racing	Chevrolet	State Water Heaters
4	Ross Chastain	JD Motorsports	Chevrolet	Delaware Office of Highway Safety "Protect Your Melon"
5	Michael Annett	JR Motorsports	Chevrolet	Pilot Flying J
7	Justin Allgaier	JR Motorsports	Chevrolet	SiteOne Landscaping Supply
8	Ray Black Jr.	B. J. McLeod Motorsports	Chevrolet	B. J. McLeod Motorsports
9	Tyler Reddick	JR Motorsports	Chevrolet	Hennessey Performance
11	Ryan Truex	Kaulig Racing	Chevrolet	Bar Harbor
13	Timmy Hill	MBM Motorsports	Toyota	MBM Motorsports
15	Joe Nemechek	JD Motorsports	Chevrolet	Meding's Seafood, Stockley Tavern & Package Store
16	Ryan Reed	Roush Fenway Racing	Ford	DriveDownA1C.com
18	Noah Gragson	Joe Gibbs Racing	Toyota	Switch "Motivated By Invention. Driven By Perfection."
19	Brandon Jones	Joe Gibbs Racing	Toyota	XYO Network
20	Christopher Bell	Joe Gibbs Racing	Toyota	Comcast, NBCUniversal Salute to Service, Rheem
21	Daniel Hemric	Richard Childress Racing	Chevrolet	South Point Hotel, Casino & Spa
22	Austin Cindric	Team Penske	Ford	Menards, Richmond Water Heaters
23	Johnny Sauter	GMS Racing	Chevrolet	Allegiant Air
24	Kaz Grala	JGL Racing	Ford	Nettts
28	Dylan Lupton	JGL Racing	Ford	ThinQ Technology Partners
35	Joey Gase	Go Green Racing with SS-Green Light Racing	Chevrolet	Sparks Energy
36	Alex Labbé	DGM Racing	Chevrolet	Wholey's, Can-Am
38	J. J. Yeley	RSS Racing	Chevrolet	RSS Racing
39	Ryan Sieg	RSS Racing	Chevrolet	Lombard Bros Gaming
40	Chad Finchum	MBM Motorsports	Toyota	Smithbilt Homes
42	John Hunter Nemechek	Chip Ganassi Racing	Chevrolet	Fire Alarm Services
45	Josh Bilicki	JP Motorsports	Toyota	Prevagen
51	Jeremy Clements	Jeremy Clements Racing	Chevrolet	RepairableVehicles.com
52	David Starr	Jimmy Means Racing	Chevrolet	Alarm Tech Systems
55	Stephen Leicht	JP Motorsports	Toyota	Jani-King "The King of Clean"
60	Ty Majeski	Roush Fenway Racing	Ford	Ford
66	Carl Long	MBM Motorsports	Dodge	CrashClaimsR.Us, Chris Kyle Memorial Benefit
74	Mike Harmon*	Mike Harmon Racing	Chevrolet	Shadow Warriors Project, Horizon Transport
76	Spencer Boyd	SS-Green Light Racing	Chevrolet	Grunt Style "This We'll Defend"
78	B. J. McLeod	B. J. McLeod Motorsports	Chevrolet	B. J. McLeod Motorsports
89	Morgan Shepherd	Shepherd Racing Ventures	Chevrolet	Visone RV
90	Brandon Brown	Brandonbilt Motorsports	Chevrolet	Coastal Carolina University
93	Jeff Green	RSS Racing	Chevrolet	RSS Racing
Official entry list

*Harmon would participate in both the Happy Hour and qualifying sessions, but would be replaced by Cody Ware in the first practice session. However, Harmon would replace Ware after Ware crashed in the session.

== Practice ==
=== First practice ===
The first practice session would occur on Friday, May 4, at 9:35 AM EST and would last for 50 minutes. Noah Gragson of Joe Gibbs Racing would set the fastest time in the session, with a lap of 23.465 and an average speed of 153.420 miles per hour (246.906 km/h).

Pos.	#	Driver	Team	Make	Time	Speed
1	18	Noah Gragson	Joe Gibbs Racing	Toyota	23.465	153.420
2	00	Cole Custer	Stewart-Haas Racing with Biagi-DenBeste	Ford	23.492	153.244
3	19	Brandon Jones	Joe Gibbs Racing	Toyota	23.500	153.191
Full first practice results

=== Second and final practice ===
The second and final practice session, sometimes referred to as Happy Hour, would occur on Friday, May 4, at 2:05 PM EST and would last for 45 minutes. Christopher Bell of Joe Gibbs Racing would set the fastest time in the session, with a lap of 23.581 and an average speed of 152.665 miles per hour (245.691 km/h).

Pos.	#	Driver	Team	Make	Time	Speed
1	20	Christopher Bell	Joe Gibbs Racing	Toyota	23.581	152.665
2	1	Elliott Sadler	JR Motorsports	Chevrolet	23.802	151.248
3	9	Tyler Reddick	JR Motorsports	Chevrolet	23.844	150.981
Full Happy Hour practice results

== Qualifying ==
Qualifying would occur on Saturday, May 5, at 9:35 AM EST. Since Dover International Speedway is under 2 miles (3.2 km), the qualifying system was a multi-car system that included three rounds. The first round was 15 minutes, where every driver would be able to set a lap within the 15 minutes. Then, the second round would consist of the fastest 24 cars in Round 1, and drivers would have 10 minutes to set a lap. Round 3 consisted of the fastest 12 drivers from Round 2, and the drivers would have 5 minutes to set a time. Whoever was fastest in Round 3 would win the pole.

Brandon Jones of Joe Gibbs Racing would win the pole after advancing from both preliminary rounds and setting the fastest lap in Round 3, with a time of 23.102 and an average speed of 155.831 miles per hour (250.786 km/h).

Nine drivers did not set a lap due to not passing inspection in time before the qualifying session.

=== Full qualifying results ===
Pos.	#	Driver	Team	Make	Time (R1)	Speed (R1)	Time (R2)	Speed (R2)	Time (R3)	Speed (R3)
1	19	Brandon Jones	Joe Gibbs Racing	Toyota	23.471	153.381	23.198	155.186	23.102	155.831
2	18	Noah Gragson	Joe Gibbs Racing	Toyota	23.324	154.347	23.323	154.354	23.132	155.629
3	2	Matt Tifft	Richard Childress Racing	Chevrolet	23.300	154.506	23.241	154.899	23.179	155.313
4	1	Elliott Sadler	JR Motorsports	Chevrolet	23.376	154.004	23.320	154.374	23.189	155.246
5	21	Daniel Hemric	Richard Childress Racing	Chevrolet	23.294	154.546	23.312	154.427	23.218	155.052
6	7	Justin Allgaier	JR Motorsports	Chevrolet	23.048	156.196	23.183	155.286	23.224	155.012
7	22	Austin Cindric	Team Penske	Ford	22.999	156.529	23.183	155.286	23.243	154.885
8	11	Ryan Truex	Kaulig Racing	Chevrolet	23.501	153.185	23.417	153.734	23.297	154.526
9	60	Ty Majeski	Roush Fenway Racing	Ford	23.420	153.715	23.292	154.560	23.341	154.235
10	3	Jeb Burton	Richard Childress Racing	Chevrolet	23.541	152.925	23.407	153.800	23.400	153.846
11	23	Johnny Sauter	GMS Racing	Chevrolet	23.460	153.453	23.392	153.899	23.430	153.649
12	16	Ryan Reed	Roush Fenway Racing	Ford	23.883	150.735	23.448	153.531	23.458	153.466
Eliminated in Round 2
13	39	Ryan Sieg	RSS Racing	Chevrolet	23.468	153.400	23.463	153.433	—	—
14	28	Dylan Lupton	JGL Racing	Ford	23.732	151.694	23.576	152.698	—	—
15	36	Alex Labbé	DGM Racing	Chevrolet	23.598	152.555	23.586	152.633	—	—
16	24	Kaz Grala	JGL Racing	Ford	24.018	149.888	23.610	152.478	—	—
17	90	Brandon Brown	Brandonbilt Motorsports	Chevrolet	23.705	151.867	23.640	152.284	—	—
18	4	Ross Chastain	JD Motorsports	Chevrolet	23.653	152.201	23.736	151.668	—	—
19	51	Jeremy Clements	Jeremy Clements Racing	Chevrolet	23.489	153.263	23.754	151.553	—	—
20	38	J. J. Yeley	RSS Racing	Chevrolet	23.668	152.104	23.868	150.830	—	—
21	35	Joey Gase	Go Green Racing with SS-Green Light Racing	Chevrolet	23.974	150.163	24.038	149.763	—	—
22	13	Timmy Hill	MBM Motorsports	Toyota	24.120	149.254	24.129	149.198	—	—
23	0	Garrett Smithley	JD Motorsports	Chevrolet	24.051	149.682	—	—	—	—
24	93	Jeff Green	RSS Racing	Chevrolet	24.079	149.508	—	—	—	—
Eliminated in Round 1
25	01	Vinnie Miller	JD Motorsports	Chevrolet	24.245	148.484	—	—	—	—
26	78	B. J. McLeod	B. J. McLeod Motorsports	Chevrolet	24.247	148.472	—	—	—	—
27	76	Spencer Boyd	SS-Green Light Racing	Chevrolet	24.266	148.356	—	—	—	—
28	89	Morgan Shepherd	Shepherd Racing Ventures	Chevrolet	24.289	148.215	—	—	—	—
29	8	Ray Black Jr.	B. J. McLeod Motorsports	Chevrolet	24.432	147.348	—	—	—	—
30	40	Chad Finchum	MBM Motorsports	Toyota	24.588	146.413	—	—	—	—
31	45	Josh Bilicki	JP Motorsports	Toyota	24.858	144.823	—	—	—	—
32	66	Carl Long	MBM Motorsports	Dodge	25.428	141.576	—	—	—	—
33	9	Tyler Reddick	JR Motorsports	Chevrolet	—	—	—	—	—	—
Qualified by owner's points
34	20	Christopher Bell	Joe Gibbs Racing	Toyota	—	—	—	—	—	—
35	42	John Hunter Nemechek	Chip Ganassi Racing	Chevrolet	—	—	—	—	—	—
36	00	Cole Custer	Stewart-Haas Racing with Biagi-DenBeste	Ford	—	—	—	—	—	—
37	5	Michael Annett	JR Motorsports	Chevrolet	—	—	—	—	—	—
38	52	David Starr	Jimmy Means Racing	Chevrolet	—	—	—	—	—	—
39	15	Joe Nemechek	JD Motorsports	Chevrolet	—	—	—	—	—	—
40	55	Stephen Leicht	JP Motorsports	Toyota	—	—	—	—	—	—
Failed to qualify
41	74	Mike Harmon	Mike Harmon Racing	Chevrolet	—	—	—	—	—	—
Official qualifying results
Official starting lineup

== Race results ==
Stage 1 Laps: 45

Pos.	#	Driver	Team	Make	Pts
1	1	Elliott Sadler	JR Motorsports	Chevrolet	10
2	7	Justin Allgaier	JR Motorsports	Chevrolet	9
3	19	Brandon Jones	Joe Gibbs Racing	Toyota	8
4	21	Daniel Hemric	Richard Childress Racing	Chevrolet	7
5	9	Tyler Reddick	JR Motorsports	Chevrolet	6
6	22	Austin Cindric	Team Penske	Ford	5
7	11	Ryan Truex	Kaulig Racing	Chevrolet	4
8	18	Noah Gragson	Joe Gibbs Racing	Toyota	0
9	20	Christopher Bell	Joe Gibbs Racing	Toyota	2
10	42	John Hunter Nemechek	Chip Ganassi Racing	Chevrolet	1

Stage 2 Laps: 45

Pos.	#	Driver	Team	Make	Pts
1	7	Justin Allgaier	JR Motorsports	Chevrolet	10
2	9	Tyler Reddick	JR Motorsports	Chevrolet	9
3	22	Austin Cindric	Team Penske	Ford	8
4	20	Christopher Bell	Joe Gibbs Racing	Toyota	7
5	2	Matt Tifft	Richard Childress Racing	Chevrolet	6
6	21	Daniel Hemric	Richard Childress Racing	Chevrolet	5
7	11	Ryan Truex	Kaulig Racing	Chevrolet	4
8	42	John Hunter Nemechek	Chip Ganassi Racing	Chevrolet	3
9	4	Ross Chastain	JD Motorsports	Chevrolet	2
10	5	Michael Annett	JR Motorsports	Chevrolet	1

Stage 3 Laps: 110

Fin	St	#	Driver	Team	Make	Laps	Led	Status	Pts
1	6	7	Justin Allgaier	JR Motorsports	Chevrolet	200	104	running	59
2	4	1	Elliott Sadler	JR Motorsports	Chevrolet	200	33	running	45
3	5	21	Daniel Hemric	Richard Childress Racing	Chevrolet	200	0	running	46
4	34	20	Christopher Bell	Joe Gibbs Racing	Toyota	200	0	running	42
5	33	9	Tyler Reddick	JR Motorsports	Chevrolet	200	23	running	47
6	11	23	Johnny Sauter	GMS Racing	Chevrolet	200	0	running	0
7	2	18	Noah Gragson	Joe Gibbs Racing	Toyota	200	0	running	0
8	3	2	Matt Tifft	Richard Childress Racing	Chevrolet	200	1	running	35
9	7	22	Austin Cindric	Team Penske	Ford	200	0	running	41
10	1	19	Brandon Jones	Joe Gibbs Racing	Toyota	200	33	running	35
11	8	11	Ryan Truex	Kaulig Racing	Chevrolet	200	0	running	34
12	10	3	Jeb Burton	Richard Childress Racing	Chevrolet	200	0	running	25
13	36	00	Cole Custer	Stewart-Haas Racing with Biagi-DenBeste	Ford	200	0	running	24
14	35	42	John Hunter Nemechek	Chip Ganassi Racing	Chevrolet	200	0	running	27
15	37	5	Michael Annett	JR Motorsports	Chevrolet	200	0	running	23
16	18	4	Ross Chastain	JD Motorsports	Chevrolet	200	0	running	23
17	13	39	Ryan Sieg	RSS Racing	Chevrolet	200	0	running	20
18	19	51	Jeremy Clements	Jeremy Clements Racing	Chevrolet	200	0	running	19
19	12	16	Ryan Reed	Roush Fenway Racing	Ford	200	0	running	18
20	21	35	Joey Gase	Go Green Racing with SS-Green Light Racing	Chevrolet	200	0	running	17
21	15	36	Alex Labbé	DGM Racing	Chevrolet	200	0	running	16
22	25	01	Vinnie Miller	JD Motorsports	Chevrolet	200	0	running	15
23	26	78	B. J. McLeod	B. J. McLeod Motorsports	Chevrolet	199	0	running	14
24	14	28	Dylan Lupton	JGL Racing	Ford	199	0	running	13
25	30	40	Chad Finchum	MBM Motorsports	Toyota	198	0	running	12
26	38	52	David Starr	Jimmy Means Racing	Chevrolet	196	0	running	11
27	29	8	Ray Black Jr.	B. J. McLeod Motorsports	Chevrolet	196	0	running	10
28	17	90	Brandon Brown	Brandonbilt Motorsports	Chevrolet	195	0	running	9
29	31	45	Josh Bilicki	JP Motorsports	Toyota	194	0	running	8
30	27	76	Spencer Boyd	SS-Green Light Racing	Chevrolet	190	0	running	7
31	39	15	Joe Nemechek	JD Motorsports	Chevrolet	188	0	running	0
32	23	0	Garrett Smithley	JD Motorsports	Chevrolet	169	2	suspension	5
33	40	55	Stephen Leicht	JP Motorsports	Toyota	149	0	vibration	4
34	9	60	Ty Majeski	Roush Fenway Racing	Ford	129	4	crash	3
35	22	13	Timmy Hill	MBM Motorsports	Toyota	113	0	transmission	2
36	20	38	J. J. Yeley	RSS Racing	Chevrolet	111	0	vibration	1
37	16	24	Kaz Grala	JGL Racing	Ford	76	0	crash	1
38	28	89	Morgan Shepherd	Shepherd Racing Ventures	Chevrolet	57	0	transmission	1
39	32	66	Carl Long	MBM Motorsports	Dodge	29	0	brakes	1
40	24	93	Jeff Green	RSS Racing	Chevrolet	11	0	vibration	1
Failed to qualify
41		74	Mike Harmon	Mike Harmon Racing	Chevrolet				
Official race results

Previous race: 2018 Sparks Energy 300	NASCAR Xfinity Series; 2018 season	Next race: 2018 Alsco 300 (Charlotte)
