= Brian Henderson (racing driver) =

American auto racing driver

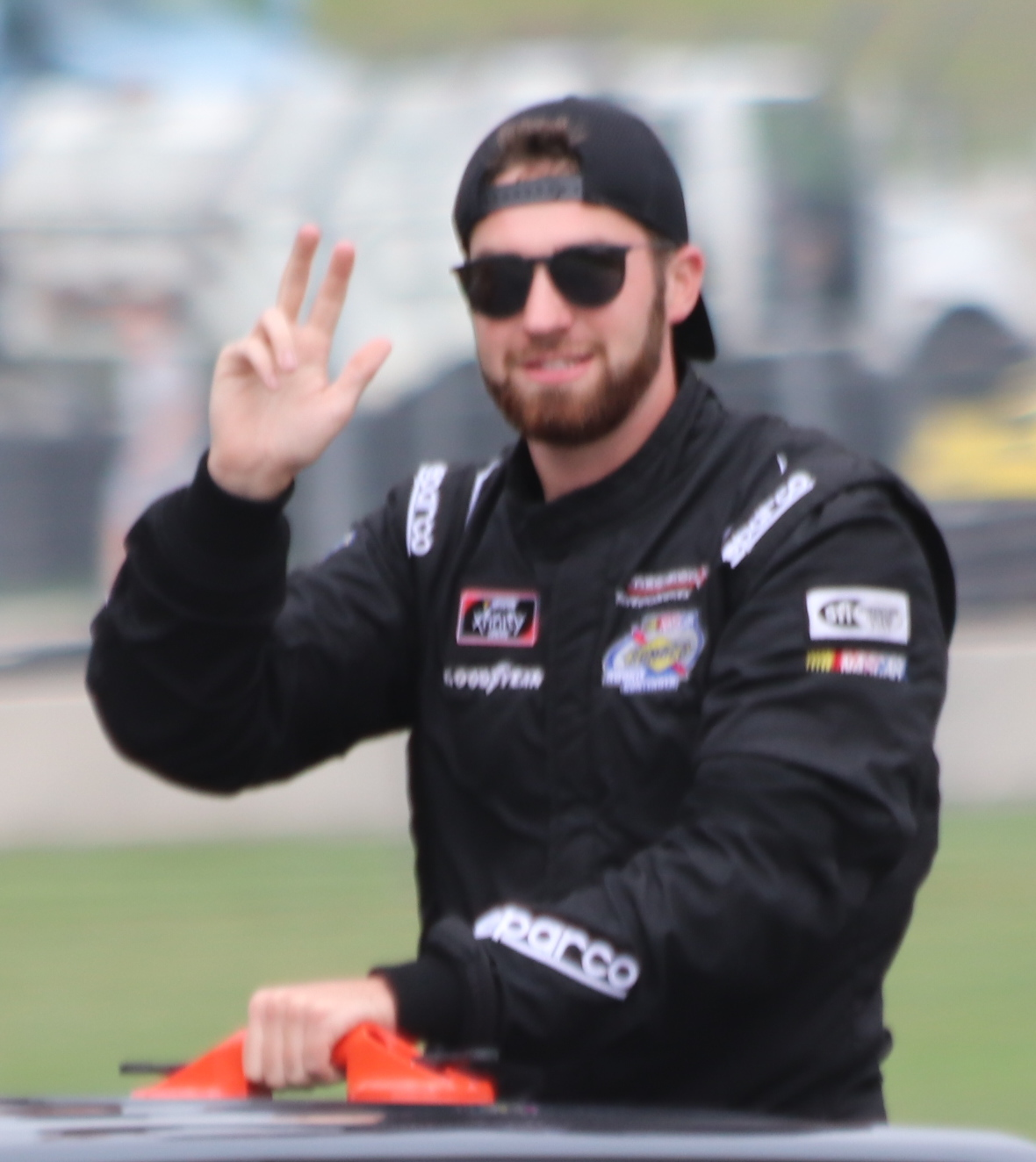
- Henderson at Road America in 2018
- Born: May 12, 1997 (age 29); Falmouth, Virginia, U.S.

NASCAR O'Reilly Auto Parts Series career
- 3 races run over 2 years
- 2018 position: 55th
- Best finish: 55th (2018)
- First race: 2017 Zippo 200 at The Glen (Watkins Glen)
- Last race: 2018 Johnsonville 180 (Road America)
Wins	Top tens	Poles
0	0	0
- Statistics up to date as of November 17, 2018.

Brian Henderson (born May 12, 1997) is an American professional stock car racing driver. He has driven in the NASCAR Xfinity Series, NASCAR K&N Pro Series East, National Auto Sport Association, Sports Car Club of America and Pirelli World Challenge.

== Racing career ==
Henderson began his racing career in go-karts at the age of five before moving up to late model racing.

=== Sports cars ===
In 2013, Henderson moved from oval racing to road racing, driving in the National Auto Sport Association and moving up to the Spec Miata class a year later.

Partnering with Rossini Racing Products in 2017, Henderson moved to the Sports Car Club of America while running NASA events, still racing Spec Miatas. Henderson claimed the 2017 NASA championship in the Performance Touring E Eastern States class. He also raced part-time in the Pirelli World Challenge, driving for Copeland Motorsports in partnership with Rossini. Henderson scored a top-five finish at Lime Rock Park. Also in 2017, he competed in the Mazda Teen Challenge, earning an invite to the MRT24 Shootout.

In 2020, Henderson ran as high as second in the Spec Miata class of the SCCA National Championship Runoffs before falling to fourth on the final lap.

=== Stock cars ===
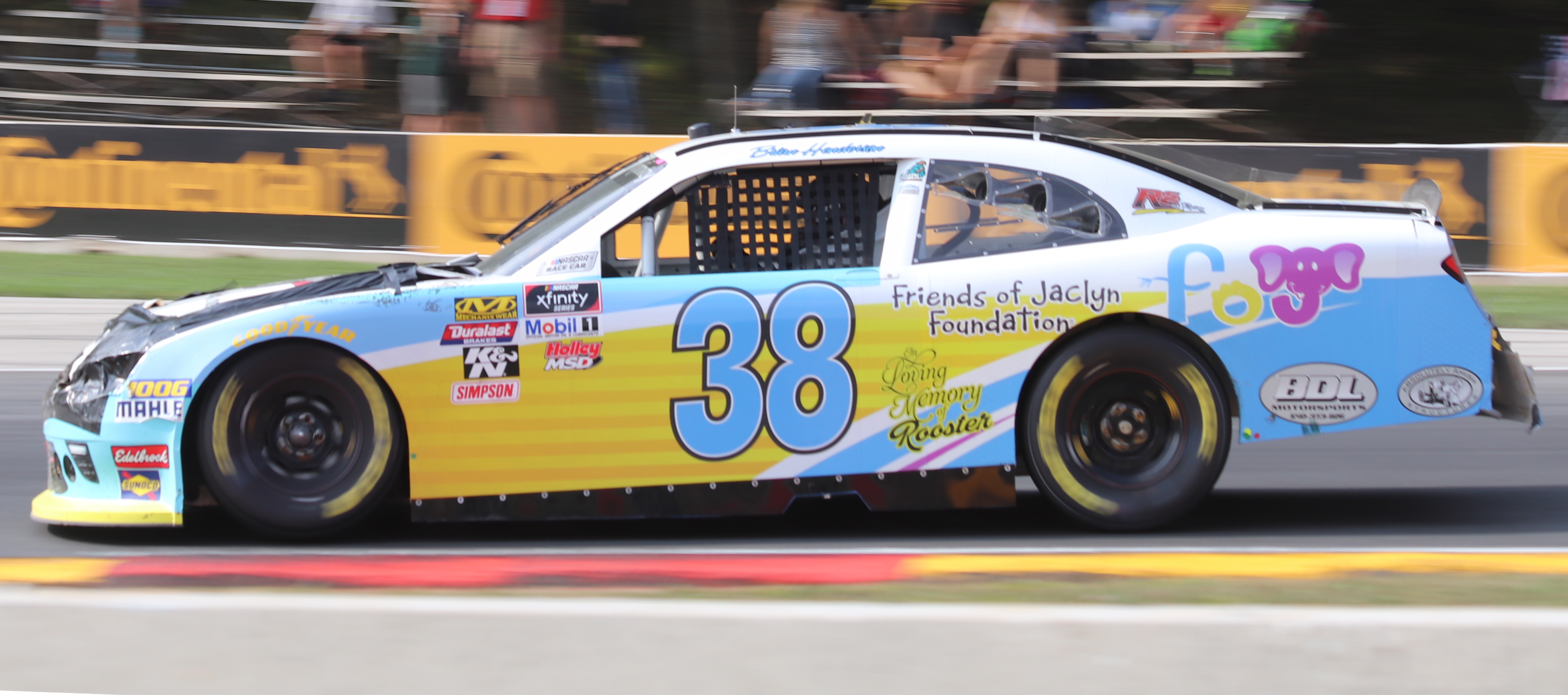
Henderson in his 2018 start at Road America

In the 2016 NASCAR K&N Pro Series East season, Henderson signed on to drive two events for Precision Performance Motorsports. Henderson, at the time, was also a development driver for the team. and scored a top-ten in his debut at Virginia International Raceway, finishing ninth after being spun in the middle of the race. He also competed at New Hampshire Motor Speedway, marking the largest oval track that he had raced on.

In 2017, Henderson made his Xfinity debut at Watkins Glen, driving the No. 90 car for Brandonbilt Motorsports. He started 34th and finished 33rd after struggling early in the race and making contact with Blake Koch.

A year later, Henderson once again returned to Watkins Glen. He partnered with Friends of Jaclyn Foundation for two races: Watkins Glen for Brandonbilt Motorsports No. 90 and Road America for Brandonbilt using No. 38 owner points from RSS Racing to make the field.

== Personal life ==
Henderson attended Stafford Senior High School and graduated in 2015. He currently attends University of North Carolina at Charlotte, majoring in mechanical engineering.

== Motorsports career results ==
=== SCCA National Championship Runoffs ===
Year	Track	Car	Engine	Class	Finish	Start	Status
2019	VIR	Mazda Miata	Mazda	Spec Miata	4	7	Running
2020	Road America	Mazda Miata	Mazda	Spec Miata	4	9	Running
2021	Indianapolis Motor Speedway	Mazda Miata	Mazda	Spec Miata	6	1	Running

=== Stock car career summary ===
Season	Series	Team	Races	Wins	Top 5	Top 10	Points	Position
2016	NASCAR K&N Pro Series East	Precision Performance Motorsports	5	0	0	1	147	22nd
2017	NASCAR Xfinity Series	Brandonbilt Motorsports	1	0	0	0	4	78th
2018	NASCAR Xfinity Series	Brandonbilt Motorsports	2	0	0	0	35	55th
2026	CARS Late Model Stock Car Tour	R&S Race Cars	1	0	0	0	25	67th

=== NASCAR ===
(key) (Bold – Pole position awarded by qualifying time. Italics – Pole position earned by points standings or practice time. * – Most laps led.)

==== Xfinity Series ====
NASCAR Xfinity Series results
Year	Team	No.	Make	1	2	3	4	5	6	7	8	9	10	11	12	13	14	15	16	17	18	19	20	21	22	23	24	25	26	27	28	29	30	31	32	33	NXSC	Pts	Ref
2017	Brandonbilt Motorsports	90	Chevy	DAY	ATL	LVS	PHO	CAL	TEX	BRI	RCH	TAL	CLT	DOV	POC	MCH	IOW	DAY	KEN	NHA	IND	IOW	GLN; 33	MOH	BRI	ROA	DAR	RCH	CHI	KEN	DOV	CLT	KAN	TEX	PHO	HOM	78th	4	
2018	Brandonbilt Motorsports	90	Chevy	DAY	ATL	LVS	PHO	CAL	TEX	BRI	RCH	TAL	DOV	CLT	POC	MCH	IOW	CHI	DAY	KEN	NHA	IOW	GLN; 21	MOH	BRI												55th	35	
2018	Brandonbilt Motorsports	38	Chevy																							ROA; 18	DAR	IND	LVS	RCH	CLT	DOV	KAN	TEX	PHO	HOM	55th	35	

==== K&N Pro Series East ====
NASCAR K&N Pro Series East results
Year	Team	No.	Make	1	2	3	4	5	6	7	8	9	10	11	12	13	14	NKNPSEC	Pts	Ref
2016	Precision Performance Motorsports	46	Chevy	NSM	MOB	GRE	BRI	VIR; 9	DOM; 14	STA	COL			GLN; 18				22nd	147	
2016	Precision Performance Motorsports	46	Toyota									NHA; 15	IOW		GRE; 17	NJM	DOV	22nd	147	

^{*} Season still in progress
^{1} Ineligible for series points

=== CARS Late Model Stock Car Tour ===
(key) (Bold – Pole position awarded by qualifying time. Italics – Pole position earned by points standings or practice time. * – Most laps led. ** – All laps led.)

CARS Late Model Stock Car Tour results
Year	Team	No.	Make	1	2	3	4	5	6	7	8	9	10	11	12	13	14	CLMSCTC	Pts	Ref
2026	R&S Race Cars	16H	Dodge	SNM	WCS	NSV	CRW	ACE	LGY	DOM; 17	NWS	HCY	AND	FLC	TCM	NPS	SBO	67th	25	
