= 2017 Continental Tire SportsCar Challenge =

Motor racing competition

The 2017 Continental Tire SportsCar Championship is the eighteenth season of the Continental Tire SportsCar Challenge and the fourth season organized by the International Motor Sports Association (IMSA).

== Classes ==
The class structure remains unchanged from 2016. However, cars homologated to the FIA-certified Group GT4 regulations are eligible to race in the GS category alongside original GS cars.

== Schedule ==
The schedule remains unchanged, aside from the dates at Circuit of the Americas and Mazda Raceway Laguna Seca switching. Additionally, there are a pair of four-hour endurance races at Daytona International Speedway and Laguna Seca. All other races are approximately two hours in length.

Rnd	Race	Circuit	Location	Date	Duration
1	BMW Endurance Challenge	Daytona International Speedway	Daytona Beach, Florida	January 27	4 Hours
2	Sebring 120	Sebring International Raceway	Sebring, Florida	March 17	2 Hours
3	Circuit of the Americas 120	Circuit of the Americas	Austin, Texas	May 6	2 Hours
4	Continental Tire 120 at The Glen	Watkins Glen International	Watkins Glen, New York	July 1	2 Hours
5	Canadian Tire Motorsports Park 120	Canadian Tire Motorsport Park	Bowmanville, Ontario	July 8	2 Hours
6	Lime Rock Park 120	Lime Rock Park	Lakeville, Connecticut	July 22	2 Hours
7	Road America 120	Road America	Elkhart Lake, Wisconsin	August 6	2 Hours
8	Biscuitville Grand Prix	VIRginia International Raceway	Alton, Virginia	August 26	2 Hours
9	Mazda Raceway Laguna Seca 240	Mazda Raceway Laguna Seca	Monterey, California	September 23	4 Hours
10	Fox Factory 120	Road Atlanta	Braselton, Georgia	October 6	2 Hours

== Entry list ==
=== Grand Sport ===
Team	Car	No.	Drivers	Rounds
(United States) Automatic Racing	Aston Martin V8 Vantage GT4	09	(United States) Ramin Abdolvahabi	1
(United States) Automatic Racing	Aston Martin V8 Vantage GT4	09	(United Kingdom) Max Bladon	1
(United States) Automatic Racing	Aston Martin V8 Vantage GT4	09	(United States) Chris Beaufait	1
(United States) Automatic Racing	Aston Martin V8 Vantage GT4	09	(United States) Charles Espenlaub	9
(United States) Automatic Racing	Aston Martin V8 Vantage GT4	09	(United States) Charles Putnam	9
(United States) Automatic Racing	Aston Martin V8 Vantage GT4	99	(United States) Al Carter	1–2, 4, 9-10
(United States) Automatic Racing	Aston Martin V8 Vantage GT4	99	(United States) Rob Ecklin Jr.	1–3, 6, 8
(United States) Automatic Racing	Aston Martin V8 Vantage GT4	99	(United States) Charles Espenlaub	1, 7
(United States) Automatic Racing	Aston Martin V8 Vantage GT4	99	(United States) Steven Phillips	3-4, 6, 8-10
(United States) Automatic Racing	Aston Martin V8 Vantage GT4	99	(United States) Charles Putman	7
(United States) VOLT Racing	McLaren 570S GT4	2	(Iceland) Alan Brynjolfsson	1
(United States) VOLT Racing	McLaren 570S GT4	2	(United Kingdom) Chris Hall	1
(United States) VOLT Racing	McLaren 570S GT4 4 Ford Mustang GT4 6	7	(Iceland) Alan Brynjolfsson	All
(United States) VOLT Racing	McLaren 570S GT4 4 Ford Mustang GT4 6	7	(United Kingdom) Chris Hall	All
(United States) TRG-AMR	Aston Martin Vantage GT4	3	(United States) Craig Lyons	1–3, 6-7, 9
(United States) TRG-AMR	Aston Martin Vantage GT4	3	(United States) Kris Wilson	1–3, 6-7, 9
(United States) TRG-AMR	Aston Martin Vantage GT4	71	(United States) Brandon Davis	9
(United States) TRG-AMR	Aston Martin Vantage GT4	71	(United States) Gregory Milzcik	9
(United States) Team TGM	Porsche Cayman GT4 Clubsport MR	4	(United States) Ted Giovanis	1–5
(United States) Team TGM	Porsche Cayman GT4 Clubsport MR	4	(United States) Guy Cosmo	1–3, 7–10
(United States) Team TGM	Porsche Cayman GT4 Clubsport MR	4	(United States) Hugh Plumb	1, 4–5, 7–10
(United States) Team TGM	Porsche Cayman GT4 Clubsport	46	(United States) Ted Giovanis	1, 3–5
(United States) Team TGM	Porsche Cayman GT4 Clubsport	46	(United States) Hugh Plumb	1, 3
(United States) Team TGM	Porsche Cayman GT4 Clubsport	46	(United States) Guy Cosmo	1, 4–5
(United States) GMG Racing	Porsche Cayman GT4 Clubsport MR	11	(New Zealand) Matthew Halliday	1
(United States) GMG Racing	Porsche Cayman GT4 Clubsport MR	11	(United States) Elias Sabo	1
(United States) GMG Racing	Porsche Cayman GT4 Clubsport MR	11	(United States) James Sofronas	1
(United States) GMG Racing	Porsche Cayman GT4 Clubsport MR	88	(United States) Andy Lee	1
(United States) GMG Racing	Porsche Cayman GT4 Clubsport MR	88	(United States) Alec Udell	1
(United States) GMG Racing	Porsche Cayman GT4 Clubsport MR	88	(United States) Carter Yeung	1
(United States) Bodymotion Racing	Porsche Cayman GT4 Clubsport	12	(Canada) Cameron Cassels	All
(United States) Bodymotion Racing	Porsche Cayman GT4 Clubsport	12	(United States) Trent Hindman	All
(United States) Motorsport USA	Maserati GranTurismo MC GT4	14	(United States) Memo Gidley	9
(United States) Motorsport USA	Maserati GranTurismo MC GT4	14	(Canada) Cavan O’Keefe	9
(United States) Motorsport USA	Maserati GranTurismo MC GT4	14	(United States) Mike McAleenan	9
(Canada) Multimatic Motorsports	Ford Mustang GT4	15	(United States) Jade Buford	1
(Canada) Multimatic Motorsports	Ford Mustang GT4	15	(Canada) Scott Maxwell	1
(Belgium) Mühlner Motorsports America	Porsche Cayman GT4 Clubsport	21	(United States) Cameron Lawrence	1–6
(Belgium) Mühlner Motorsports America	Porsche Cayman GT4 Clubsport	21	(Canada) Kyle Marcelli	1
(Belgium) Mühlner Motorsports America	Porsche Cayman GT4 Clubsport	21	(United States) Chuck Quinton	2-6
(Belgium) Mühlner Motorsports America	Porsche Cayman GT4 Clubsport	21	(Germany) Moritz Kranz	7
(Belgium) Mühlner Motorsports America	Porsche Cayman GT4 Clubsport	21	(Italy) Gabriele Piana	7
(United States) RS1	Porsche Cayman GT4 Clubsport MR	28	(United States) Dillon Machavern	All
(United States) RS1	Porsche Cayman GT4 Clubsport MR	28	(United States) Dylan Murcott	All
(United States) CJ Wilson Racing	Porsche Cayman GT4 Clubsport	33	(United Kingdom) Till Bechtolsheimer	All
(United States) CJ Wilson Racing	Porsche Cayman GT4 Clubsport	33	(United States) Marc Miller	All
(United States) CJ Wilson Racing	Porsche Cayman GT4 Clubsport	35	(Republic of Ireland) Damien Faulkner	All
(United States) CJ Wilson Racing	Porsche Cayman GT4 Clubsport	35	(United States) Russell Ward	All
(United States) BGB Motorsports	Porsche Cayman GT4 Clubsport MR	38	(United States) James Cox	1–2
(United States) BGB Motorsports	Porsche Cayman GT4 Clubsport MR	38	(United States) John Tecce	1–2
(United States) Stevenson Motorsports	Chevrolet Camaro GT4.R	57	(United States) Matt Bell	3–8
(United States) Stevenson Motorsports	Chevrolet Camaro GT4.R	57	(United Kingdom) Robin Liddell	3–8
(United States) KohR Motorsports	Ford Mustang GT4	59	(United States) Dean Martin	1–8
(United States) KohR Motorsports	Ford Mustang GT4	59	(United States) Jack Roush Jr.	1–4, 6–10
(United States) KohR Motorsports	Ford Mustang GT4	59	(United States) Cameron Maugeri	1
(United States) KohR Motorsports	Ford Mustang GT4	59	(Canada) Scott Maxwell	5, 9–10
(United States) KohR Motorsports	Ford Mustang GT4	59	(United States) Nate Stacy	9
(United States) KohR Motorsports	Ford Mustang GT4	60	(United States) Jade Buford	2
(United States) KohR Motorsports	Ford Mustang GT4	60	(Canada) Scott Maxwell	2
(United States) KohR Motorsports	Ford Mustang GT4	60	(United States) Nate Stacy	10
(United States) KohR Motorsports	Ford Mustang GT4	60	(United States) Parker Chase	10
(Canada) Motorsports In Action	McLaren 570S GT4	68	(United States) Rod Randall	1–4, 7–8
(Canada) Motorsports In Action	McLaren 570S GT4	68	(Canada) Kenny Wilden	1–4, 7–8
(Canada) Motorsports In Action	McLaren 570S GT4	69	(Canada) Chris Green	All
(Canada) Motorsports In Action	McLaren 570S GT4	69	(Canada) Jesse Lazare	All
(Canada) C360R	McLaren 570S GT4	681	(United States) Mathew Keegan	5-6
(Canada) C360R	McLaren 570S GT4	681	(France) Nico Rondet	5-6
(Canada) C360R	McLaren 570S GT4	76	(United States) Paul Holton	All
(Canada) C360R	McLaren 570S GT4	76	(United States) Matt Plumb	All
(Canada) C360R	McLaren 570S GT4	77	(United States) Mathew Keegan	1–4, 7–10
(Canada) C360R	McLaren 570S GT4	77	(France) Nico Rondet	1–4, 7–10

=== Street Tuner ===
Team	Car	No.	Drivers	Rounds
(United States) Rebel Rock Racing	Porsche Cayman	6	(United States) Trevor Knight	1
(United States) Rebel Rock Racing	Porsche Cayman	6	(United States) Shane Lewis	1
(United States) Rebel Rock Racing	Porsche Cayman	8	(South Africa) Dion von Moltke	1
(United States) Rebel Rock Racing	Porsche Cayman	8	(United States) David Roberts	1
(United States) Rebel Rock Racing	Porsche Cayman	22	(United States) Leh Keen	1
(United States) Rebel Rock Racing	Porsche Cayman	22	(United States) Kris Wright	1
(United States) RS1	Porsche Cayman	17	(United States) Nick Galante	All
(United States) RS1	Porsche Cayman	17	(United States) Spencer Pumpelly	All
(United States) RS1	Porsche Cayman	18	(United States) Connor Bloum	All
(United States) RS1	Porsche Cayman	18	(United States) Aurora Straus	All
(United States) RS1	Porsche Cayman	18	(United States) Nick Longhi	1
(United States) Freedom Autosport	Mazda MX-5	25	(United Kingdom) Stevan McAleer	All
(United States) Freedom Autosport	Mazda MX-5	25	(United States) Chad McCumbee	All
(United States) Freedom Autosport	Mazda MX-5	26	(United States) Andrew Carbonell	All
(United States) Freedom Autosport	Mazda MX-5	26	(United States) Liam Dwyer	All
(United States) Freedom Autosport	Mazda MX-5	27	(United States) Britt Casey Jr.	All
(United States) Freedom Autosport	Mazda MX-5	27	(United States) Robby Foley	1–3
(United States) Freedom Autosport	Mazda MX-5	27	(United States) Matthew Fassnacht	4, 6
(United States) Freedom Autosport	Mazda MX-5	27	(United States) Mark Drennan	5, 9
(United States) Freedom Autosport	Mazda MX-5	27	(United States) Tom Long	7–8, 10
(United States) Bodymotion Racing	Porsche Cayman	31	(United States) Devin Jones	1–6, 8–10
(United States) Bodymotion Racing	Porsche Cayman	31	(United States) Drake Kemper	All
(United States) Bodymotion Racing	Porsche Cayman	31	(United States) Colin Thompson	7
(United States) Murillo Racing	Mazda MX-5	34	(United States) Christopher Stone	2, 4–10
(United States) Murillo Racing	Mazda MX-5	34	(United States) Christian Szymczak	2, 4–10
(United States) Murillo Racing	Porsche Cayman	43	(United States) Christopher Stone	1
(United States) Murillo Racing	Porsche Cayman	43	(United States) Christian Szymczak	1
(United States) Murillo Racing	Porsche Cayman	56	(United States) Eric Foss	All
(United States) Murillo Racing	Porsche Cayman	56	(United States) Jeff Mosing	1–8
(United States) Murillo Racing	Porsche Cayman	56	(United States) Justin Piscitell	9–10
(United States) Murillo Racing	Porsche Cayman	65	(United States) Brent Mosing	1–6, 8–10
(United States) Murillo Racing	Porsche Cayman	65	(United States) Tim Probert	All
(United States) Murillo Racing	Porsche Cayman	65	(United States) Justin Piscitell	1, 7, 9
(United States) Strategic Wealth Racing	Porsche Cayman	36	(United States) Matthew Dicken	4
(United States) Strategic Wealth Racing	Porsche Cayman	36	(United States) Corey Lewis	4
(United Kingdom) MINI JCW Team	Mini JCW	37	(United States) Mike LaMarra	1–3, 5–10
(United Kingdom) MINI JCW Team	Mini JCW	37	(Canada) James Vance	1–3, 5–10
(United Kingdom) MINI JCW Team	Mini JCW	52	(United States) Mark Pombo	1–2, 4, 6, 9–10
(United Kingdom) MINI JCW Team	Mini JCW	52	(United States) Nate Norenberg	1, 3, 5–9
(United Kingdom) MINI JCW Team	Mini JCW	52	(United States) Jared Salinsky	2, 4–5, 10
(United Kingdom) MINI JCW Team	Mini JCW	52	(United States) Tyler Stone	3, 8
(United Kingdom) MINI JCW Team	Mini JCW	52	(United States) Chris Miller	7
(United Kingdom) MINI JCW Team	Mini JCW	73	(United States) Derek Jones	All
(United Kingdom) MINI JCW Team	Mini JCW	73	(United States) Mat Pombo	All
(United States) Goldcrest Motorsports	Porsche Cayman	39	(United States) Angus Rogers	10
(United States) Goldcrest Motorsports	Porsche Cayman	39	(United States) Curt Swearingen	10
(United States) CRG-I Do Borrow	Nissan Altima	44	(United States) Sarah Cattaneo	All
(United States) CRG-I Do Borrow	Nissan Altima	44	(United States) Owen Trinkler	All
(United States) Team Octane	Mini JCW	47	(United States) Adam Isman	4-5
(United States) Team Octane	Mini JCW	47	(Canada) Alain Lauziere	4
(United States) Team Octane	Mini JCW	47	(Canada) Cavan O'Keefe	5
(United States) JDC-Miller Motorsports	BMW 228i	54	(United States) Michael Johnson	All
(United States) JDC-Miller Motorsports	BMW 228i	54	(South Africa) Stephen Simpson	All
(United States) Kensai/DXDT Racing	Porsche Cayman	65	(United States) David Askew	4–5, 8
(United States) Kensai/DXDT Racing	Porsche Cayman	65	(United States) Aaron Povoledo	4–5, 8
(Canada) Riley Racing	Mazda MX-5	66	(United States) AJ Riley	4, 6
(Canada) Riley Racing	Mazda MX-5	66	(United States) Jameson Riley	4, 6
(Canada) C360R	Audi S3	75	(Argentina) Roy Block	All
(Canada) C360R	Audi S3	75	(Brazil) Pierre Kleinubing	All
(United States) BimmerWorld Racing	BMW 328i (F30)	81	(United States) Ari Balogh	All
(United States) BimmerWorld Racing	BMW 328i (F30)	81	(United States) Greg Liefooghe	All
(United States) BimmerWorld Racing	BMW 328i (F30)	84	(United States) James Clay	All
(United States) BimmerWorld Racing	BMW 328i (F30)	84	(United States) Tyler Cooke	All
(United States) BimmerWorld Racing	BMW 328i (F30)	84	(United States) Tyler Clary	1

== Race results ==
Bold indicates overall winner.

Rnd	Circuit	GS Winning Car	ST Winning Team
Rnd	Circuit	GS Winning Drivers	ST Winning Drivers
1	Daytona	**(Canada) #12 Porsche Cayman GT4 Clubsport**	(United Kingdom) #73 MINI Cooper
1	Daytona	**(Canada) Cameron Cassels** **(United States) Trent Hindman**	(United States) Derek Jones (United States) Mat Pombo
2	Sebring	**(United States) #60 Ford Mustang**	(United States) #17 Porsche Cayman
2	Sebring	**(United States) Jade Buford** **(Canada) Scott Maxwell**	(United States) Nick Galante (United States) Spencer Pumpelly
3	Austin	**(Canada) #76 McLaren 570S GT4**	(United States) #56 Porsche Cayman
3	Austin	**(United States) Paul Holton** **(United States) Matt Plumb**	(United States) Eric Foss (United States) Jeff Mosing
4	Watkins Glen	**(United States) #59 Ford Mustang**	(United Kingdom) #73 MINI Cooper
4	Watkins Glen	**(United States) Dean Martin** **(United States) Jack Roush Jr.**	(United States) Derek Jones (United States) Mat Pombo
5	Mosport	**(United States) #57 Chevrolet Camaro GT4.R**	(United States) #56 Porsche Cayman
5	Mosport	**(United States) Matt Bell** **(United Kingdom) Robin Liddell**	(United States) Eric Foss (United States) Jeff Mosing
6	Lime Rock	**(United States) #57 Chevrolet Camaro GT4.R**	(United States) #25 Mazda MX-5
6	Lime Rock	**(United States) Matt Bell** **(United Kingdom) Robin Liddell**	(United Kingdom) Stevan McAleer (United States) Chad McCumbee
7	Road America	**(United States) #59 Ford Mustang**	(United States) #25 Mazda MX-5
7	Road America	**(United States) Dean Martin** **(United States) Jack Roush Jr.**	(United Kingdom) Stevan McAleer (United States) Chad McCumbee
8	Virginia	**(Belgium) #28 Porsche Cayman GT4 Clubsport MR**	(United States) #44 Nissan Altima
8	Virginia	**(United States) Dillon Machavern** **(United States) Dylan Murcott**	(United States) Sarah Cattaneo (United States) Owen Trinkler
9	Laguna Seca	**(United States) #99 Aston Martin Vantage GT4**	#75 Audi S3
9	Laguna Seca	**(United States) Al Carter** **(United States) Steven Phillips**	(Argentina) Roy Block (Brazil) Pierre Kleinubing
10	Road Atlanta	**(Canada) #69 McLaren 570S GT4**	(United States) #44 Nissan Altima
10	Road Atlanta	**(Canada) Chris Green** **(Canada) Jesse Lazare**	(United States) Sarah Cattaneo (United States) Owen Trinkler
