= Peter Shepherd (racing driver) =

Canadian racing driver (born 1986)

- Born: August 13, 1986 (age 40); Brampton, Ontario, Canada

NASCAR O'Reilly Auto Parts Series career
- 1 race run over 1 year
- 2018 position: 75th
- Best finish: 75th (2018)
- First race: 2018 U.S. Cellular 250 (Iowa)
Wins	Top tens	Poles
0	0	0

NASCAR FedEx Freight Truck Series career
- 7 races run over 2 years
- 2007 position: 55th
- Best finish: 54th (2006)
- First race: 2006 O'Reilly 300 (Memphis)
- Last race: 2007 Power Stroke Diesel 200 (IRP)
Wins	Top tens	Poles
0	0	0

NASCAR Canada Series career
- 39 races run over 8 years
- 2021 position: 15th
- Best finish: 14th (2011)
- First race: 2008 Coke Zero 200 (Cayuga)
- Last race: 2021 Pinty's Fall Brawl (Delaware)
Wins	Top tens	Poles
5	29	3
- Statistics up to date as of December 11, 2024.

Peter Shepherd III (born August 13, 1986) is a Canadian professional stock car racing driver. He last competed part-time in the NASCAR Canada Series for Dave Jacombs Racing and in the APC Series in the No. 22 APC/Total car.

== Racing career ==
Shepherd started in go-karts and moved on to the Thunder Car division at Flamboro Speedway. He progressed from there to Late Model running in the ALSTAR Series and then into Super Late Models with OSCAAR. Shepherd eventually worked his way into Canada's top series, CASCAR, running a season and a half, winning races as well as Rookie of the year. His prowess drew the attention of NASCAR owner Jack Roush, who invited him to Roush Racing: Driver X, the audition that was held in 2005 and televised on the Discovery Channel.

Shepherd turned heads with a surprising performance, ending up as one of six finalists in the competition.

Roush then signed Shepherd to further development, first in the ARCA RE/MAX Series in the No. 39 car for the Daytona season opener, then in several races in the Craftsman Truck Series. Shepherd's series debut was at Memphis Motorsports Park on July 22, 2006, where he finished 23rd. Shepherd made two more starts that year, finishing 31st at Nashville Superspeedway and 18th at Las Vegas Motor Speedway.

In the 2007 season, Shepherd shared the No. 50 ride in the Craftsman Truck Series with T. J. Bell. Shepherd was later released from his development contract due to a lack of sponsorship. He then returned to a part time schedule in the NASCAR Canada Series. He picked up his first win at Kawartha Speedway in September 2010. Shepherd would pick up his second win in 2011, and won three more between 2012 and 2013. He wouldn't return to the series until 2018, where he made six starts. He would run again in 2019 and 2021.

In 2018, Shepherd finally made his NASCAR Xfinity Series debut at Iowa Speedway driving the No. 55 for JP Motorsports. He finished 31st, 15 laps down.

== Motorsports career results ==
=== NASCAR ===
(key) (Bold – Pole position awarded by qualifying time. Italics – Pole position earned by points standings or practice time. * – Most laps led.)

==== Xfinity Series ====
NASCAR Xfinity Series results
Year	Team	No.	Make	1	2	3	4	5	6	7	8	9	10	11	12	13	14	15	16	17	18	19	20	21	22	23	24	25	26	27	28	29	30	31	32	33	34	35	NXSC	Pts	Ref
2006	Roush Racing	60	Ford	DAY	CAL	MXC	LVS	ATL	BRI	TEX	NSH	PHO	TAL	RCH	DAR	CLT	DOV	NSH	KEN	MLW	DAY	CHI	NHA	MAR	GTY	IRP	GLN	MCH	BRI	CAL	RCH	DOV	KAN	CLT	MEM; QL^{†}	TEX	PHO	HOM	NA	-	
2018	JP Motorsports	55	Toyota	DAY	ATL	LVS	PHO	CAL	TEX	BRI	RCH	TAL	DOV	CLT	POC	MCH	IOW	CHI	DAY	KEN	NHA	IOW; 31	GLN	MOH	BRI	ROA	DAR	IND	LVS	RCH	CLT	DOV	KAN	TEX	PHO	HOM			75th	6	
^{†} - Qualified for Carl Edwards

==== Craftsman Truck Series ====
NASCAR Craftsman Truck Series results
Year	Team	No.	Make	1	2	3	4	5	6	7	8	9	10	11	12	13	14	15	16	17	18	19	20	21	22	23	24	25	NCTC	Pts	Ref
2006	Roush Racing	50	Ford	DAY	CAL	ATL	MAR	GTY	CLT	MFD	DOV	TEX	MCH	MLW	KAN	KEN	MEM; 23	IRP	NSH; 31	BRI	NHA								54th	273	
2006	Roush Racing	6	Ford																			LVS; 18	TAL	MAR	ATL	TEX	PHO	HOM	54th	273	
2007	Roush Fenway Racing	50	Ford	DAY	CAL	ATL	MAR	KAN	CLT	MFD	DOV	TEX	MCH	MLW; 32	MEM; 15	KEN; 32	IRP; 21	NSH	BRI	GTW	NHA	LVS	TAL	MAR	ATL	TEX	PHO	HOM	55th	352	

=== ARCA Re/Max Series ===
(key) (Bold – Pole position awarded by qualifying time. Italics – Pole position earned by points standings or practice time. * – Most laps led.)

ARCA Re/Max Series results
Year	Team	No.	Make	1	2	3	4	5	6	7	8	9	10	11	12	13	14	15	16	17	18	19	20	21	22	23	ARMC	Pts	Ref
2006	Roulo Brothers Racing	39	Ford	DAY	NSH	SLM	WIN	KEN	TOL	POC	MCH	KAN	KEN	BLN	POC	GTW; 4	NSH; DNQ	MCH; 10	ISF	MIL; 36	TOL	DSF	CHI; 10	SLM	TAL; 24	IOW	51st	755	
2007	Roulo Brothers Racing	39	Ford	DAY	USA	NSH	SLM	KAN	WIN	KEN	TOL	IOW	POC	MCH; 22	BLN						GTW; 21	DSF	CHI; 22	SLM	TAL	TOL	67th	390	
2007	Roush Fenway Racing	99	Ford													KEN; DNQ	POC	NSH	ISF	MIL							67th	390	
2008	Roulo Brothers Racing	39	Ford	DAY	SLM	IOW	KAN	CAR	KEN	TOL	POC	MCH	CAY; 5	KEN	BLN	POC	NSH	ISF	DSF	CHI	SLM	NJE	TAL	TOL			93rd	205	
2009	Venturini Motorsports	25	Chevy	DAY	SLM	CAR	TAL	KEN	TOL	POC	MCH	MFD	IOW	KEN	BLN; 4	POC	ISF	CHI	TOL	DSF	NJE	SLM	KAN	CAR			90th	250	
