= 2018 NASCAR Xfinity Series =

American motorsport season

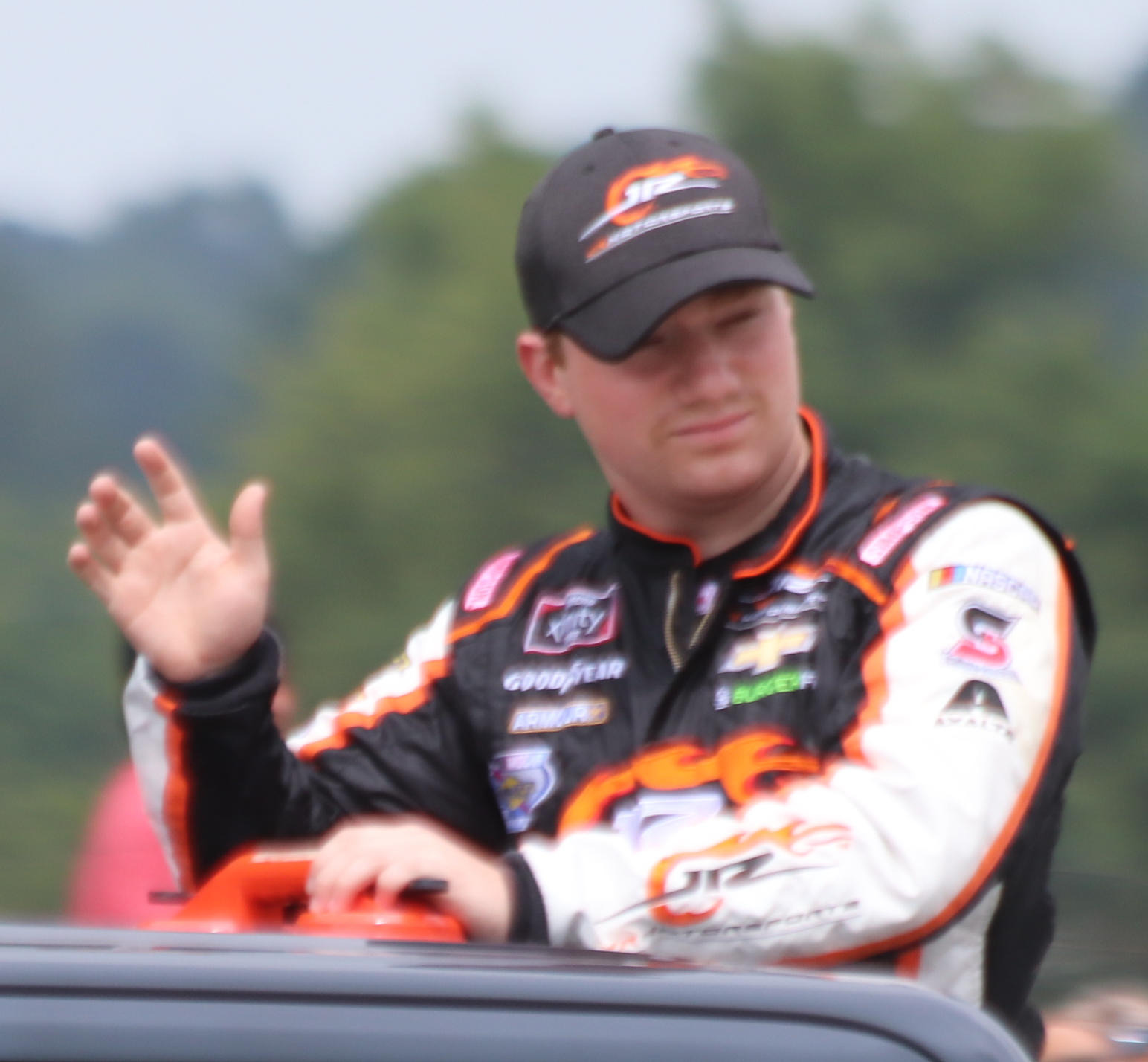
Tyler Reddick, the 2018 Xfinity Series champion as well as the Rookie of the Year.

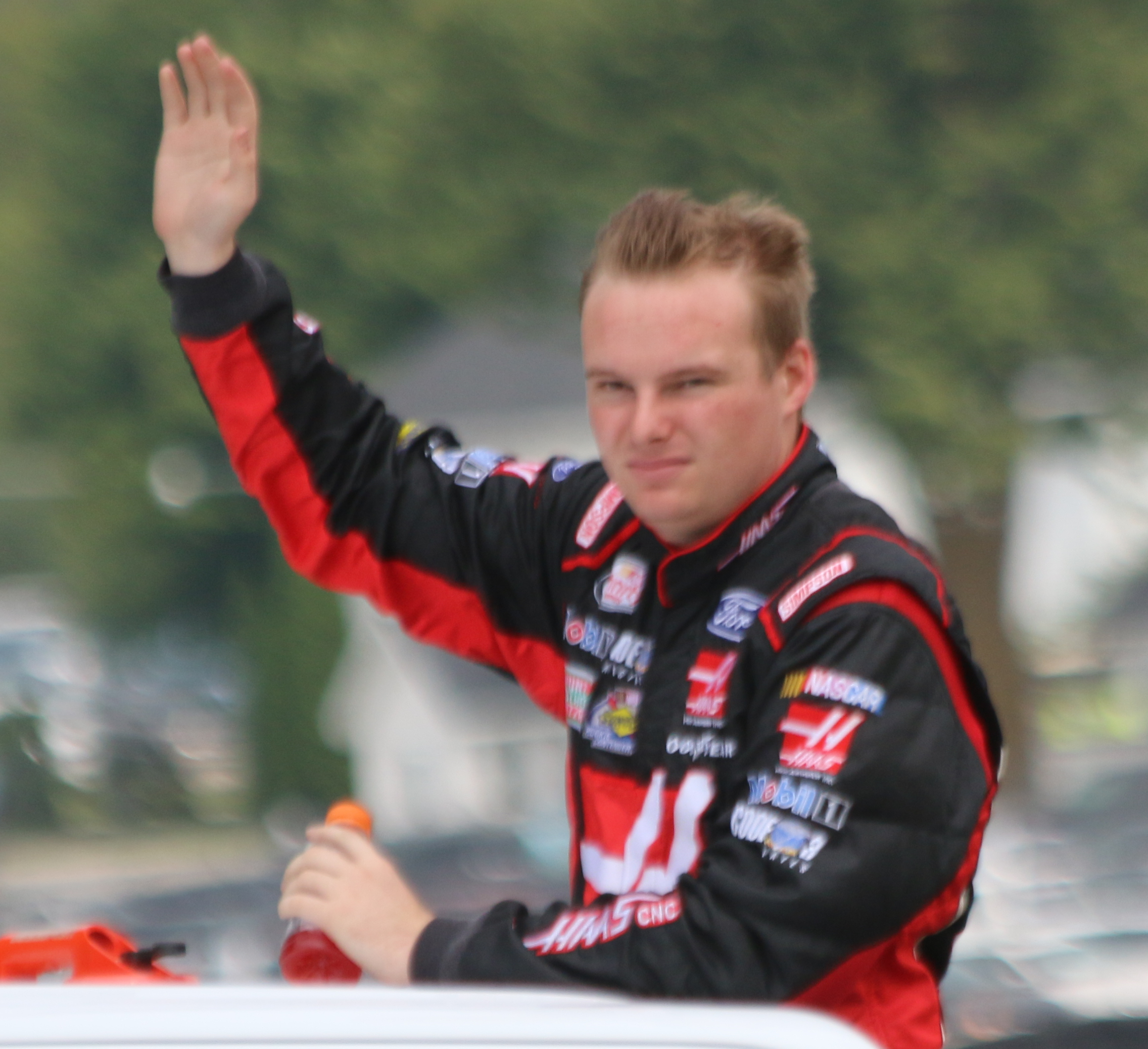
Cole Custer finished second behind Reddick in the championship.

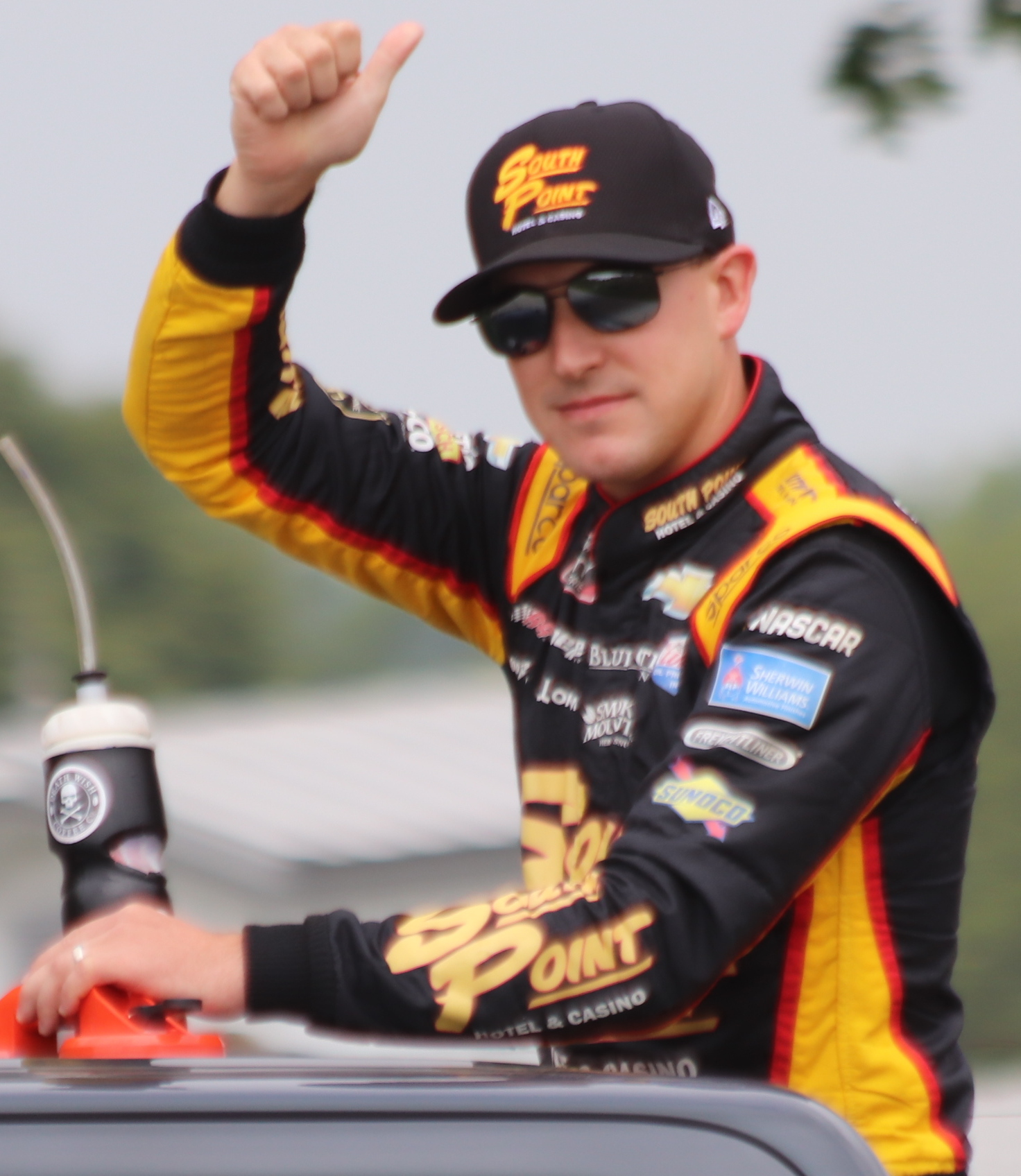
Daniel Hemric finished third in the championship.

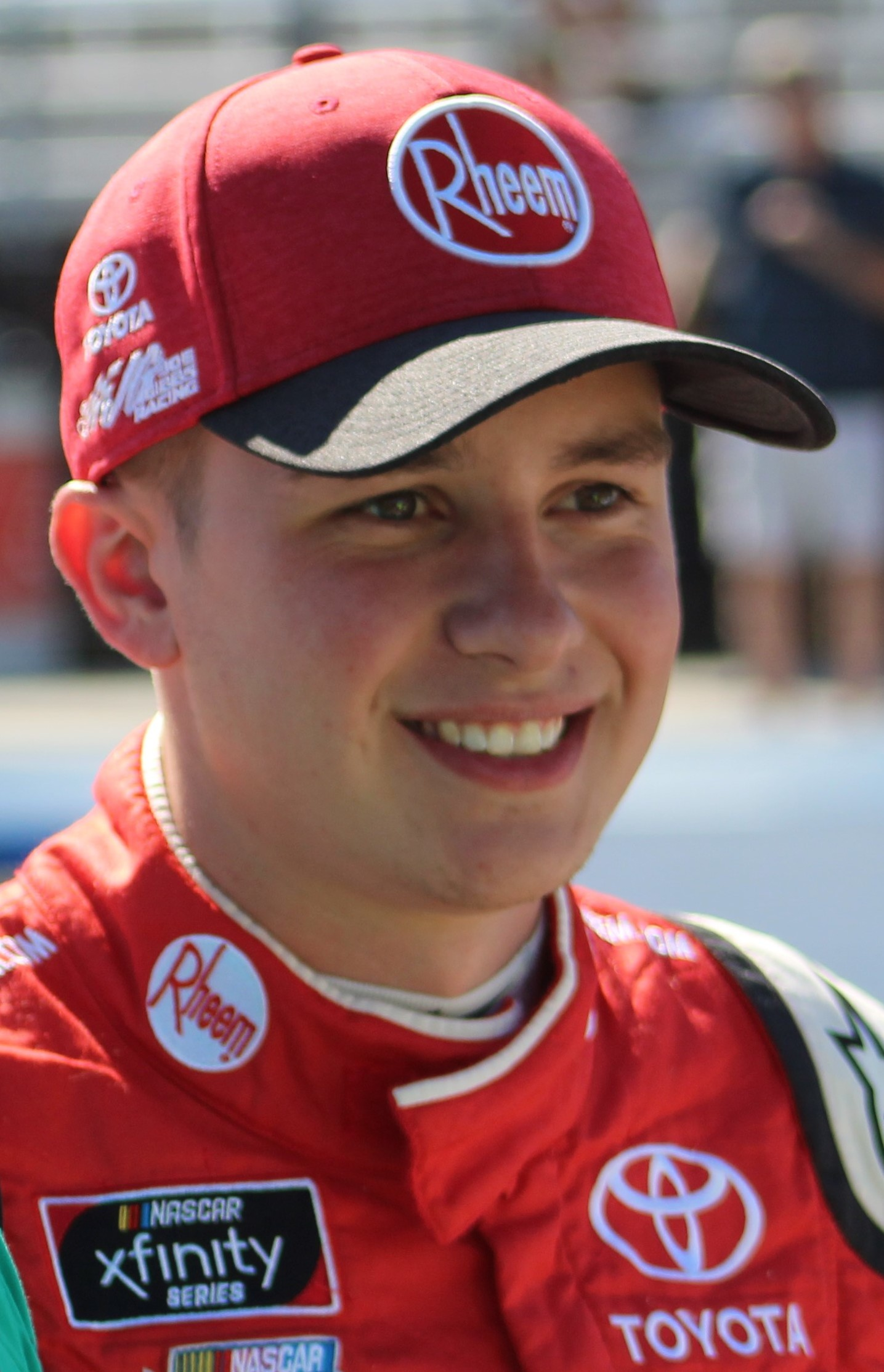
Christopher Bell, the defending Truck Series champion, who moved up to the Xfinity Series full-time in 2018, finished fourth in the championship.

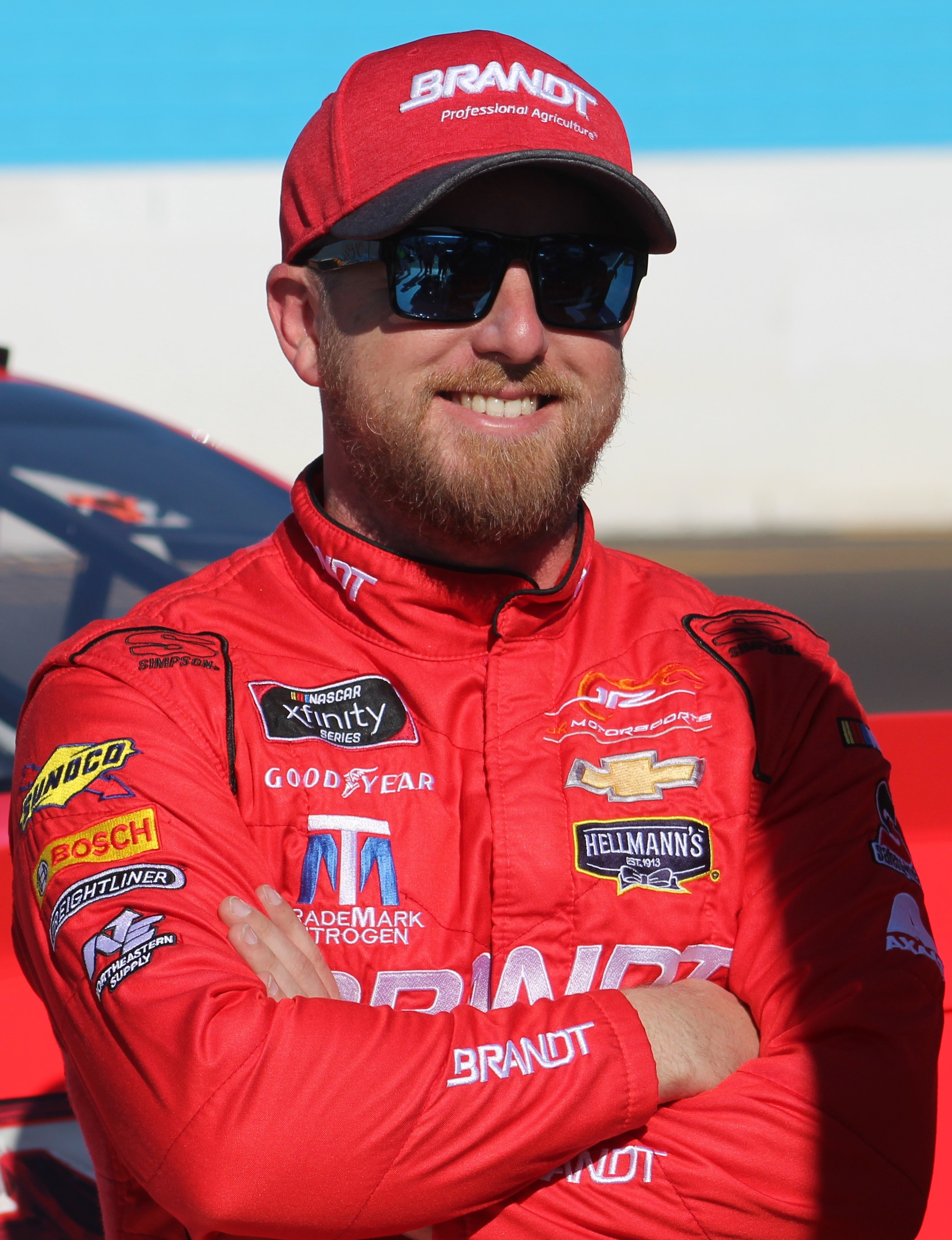
Justin Allgaier, the regular season champion, finished seventh in the championship.

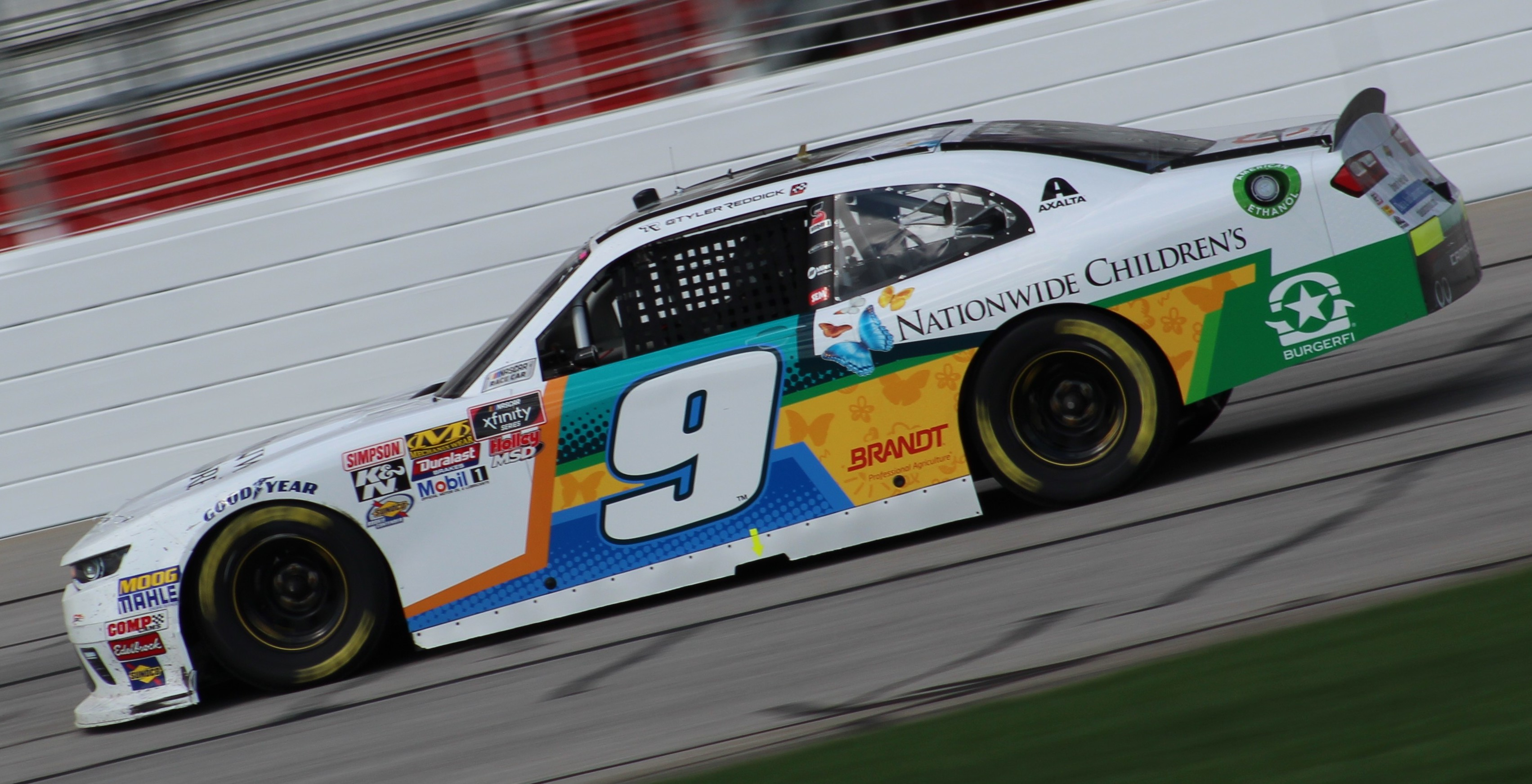
Chevy won the manufacturer's championship.

The 2018 NASCAR Xfinity Series was the 37th season of the NASCAR Xfinity Series, a stock car racing series sanctioned by NASCAR in the United States. William Byron won the 2017 championship with JR Motorsports, but moved up to the Monster Energy NASCAR Cup Series. Tyler Reddick, who replaced Byron in the No. 9 JR Motorsports Chevrolet Camaro SS, won the drivers' championship. Stewart–Haas Racing with Biagi–DenBeste won the owners' championship.

This was the third year that the Xfinity Series (and the Truck Series) had a playoff system. For the first time in the three years of the playoffs at that time, Elliott Sadler and Justin Allgaier were not part of the "championship 4" drivers competing for the title at Homestead–Miami Speedway. Both drivers did qualify for the postseason but did not advance to the last round of the playoffs as they had done the past two years.

The 2018 season was the first to feature the Regular Season Championship trophy, which is awarded at the final race before the playoffs. Justin Allgaier clinched the NXS Regular Season Championship trophy after the 2018 DC Solar 300 at Las Vegas Motor Speedway.

This was the final season of the Toyota Camry in the Xfinity Series, as it was replaced by the Supra in the 2019 season. It was also the final season of Dodge as a manufacturer, as the new flange-fit composite body rules have made the former Team Penske Challengers (nicknamed "Zombie Dodges" due to their lack of factory support since 2013) used by smaller teams ineligible due to their welded steel bodies. This was also the last year of 5-time Xfinity Champion Roush Racing in Xfinity. After this season, Roush continued only in the Cup Series.

== Teams and drivers ==
=== Complete schedule ===
Manufacturer	Team	No.	Race driver	Crew chief
Chevrolet	Chip Ganassi Racing	42	Kyle Larson 6	Mike Shiplett 32; Nick Harvey 1
Chevrolet	Chip Ganassi Racing	42	John Hunter Nemechek 18	Mike Shiplett 32; Nick Harvey 1
Chevrolet	Chip Ganassi Racing	42	Jamie McMurray 3	Mike Shiplett 32; Nick Harvey 1
Chevrolet	Chip Ganassi Racing	42	Justin Marks 3	Mike Shiplett 32; Nick Harvey 1
Chevrolet	Chip Ganassi Racing	42	Ross Chastain 3 (Note: Chastain ran the full season split between the Chip Ganassi Racing No. 42 and the JD Motorsports No. 4.)	Mike Shiplett 32; Nick Harvey 1
Chevrolet	DGM Racing	36	Alex Labbé (R)	Mario Gosselin
Chevrolet	DGM Racing	90	Josh Williams 20	John Holmes
Chevrolet	DGM Racing	90	Donald Theetge 2	Josh Williams
Chevrolet	DGM Racing	90	Andy Lally 3	Josh Williams
Chevrolet	DGM Racing	90	Caesar Bacarella 1	Thomas Bear
Chevrolet	Brandonbilt Motorsports	90	Brandon Brown 5	Adam Brenner
Chevrolet	Brandonbilt Motorsports	90	Brian Henderson 1	Adam Brenner
Chevrolet	Brandonbilt Motorsports	90	Mason Diaz 1	Adam Brenner
Chevrolet	GMS Racing	23	Spencer Gallagher 19	Chad Norris
Chevrolet	GMS Racing	23	Johnny Sauter 2	Chad Norris
Chevrolet	GMS Racing	23	Chase Elliott 7	Chad Norris
Chevrolet	GMS Racing	23	Alex Bowman 1	Chad Norris
Chevrolet	GMS Racing	23	Justin Haley 1	Chad Norris
Chevrolet	GMS Racing	23	Casey Roderick 1	Chad Norris
Chevrolet	GMS Racing	23	A. J. Allmendinger 1	Chad Norris
Chevrolet	GMS Racing	23	Bill Elliott 1	Chad Norris
Chevrolet	Go Green Racing with SS-Green Light Racing	35	Joey Gase	Patrick Donahue
Chevrolet	JD Motorsports	0	Garrett Smithley 30	Wayne Carroll 19; Paul Clapprood 2 Mark Setzer 12
Chevrolet	JD Motorsports	0	Matt Mills (R) 2	Wayne Carroll 19; Paul Clapprood 2 Mark Setzer 12
Chevrolet	JD Motorsports	0	Vinnie Miller (R) 1	Wayne Carroll 19; Paul Clapprood 2 Mark Setzer 12
Chevrolet	JD Motorsports	01	Vinnie Miller (R) 26	Ryan Bell 1 Bryan Berry 28
Chevrolet	JD Motorsports	01	Landon Cassill 2	Ryan Bell 1 Bryan Berry 28
Chevrolet	JD Motorsports	01	Lawson Aschenbach 1	Ryan Bell 1 Bryan Berry 28
Chevrolet	JD Motorsports	01	B. J. McLeod 4	Paul Clapprood
Chevrolet	JD Motorsports	4	Ross Chastain 30	Robert Goodman 15; Rick Johnson 1 Evan Snider 17
Chevrolet	JD Motorsports	4	Garrett Smithley 1	Robert Goodman 15; Rick Johnson 1 Evan Snider 17
Chevrolet	JD Motorsports	4	Landon Cassill 1	Robert Goodman 15; Rick Johnson 1 Evan Snider 17
Chevrolet	JD Motorsports	4	Quin Houff 1	Robert Goodman 15; Rick Johnson 1 Evan Snider 17
Chevrolet	JD Motorsports	15	Joe Nemechek 6	Ronald Drake 11; Tevin Bair 1 Paul Clapprood 17
Chevrolet	JD Motorsports	15	Garrett Smithley 2	Ronald Drake 11; Tevin Bair 1 Paul Clapprood 17
Chevrolet	JD Motorsports	15	Matt Mills (R) 5	Ronald Drake 11; Tevin Bair 1 Paul Clapprood 17
Chevrolet	JD Motorsports	15	B. J. McLeod 10	Ronald Drake 11; Tevin Bair 1 Paul Clapprood 17
Chevrolet	JD Motorsports	15	Brandon Hightower 1	Ronald Drake 11; Tevin Bair 1 Paul Clapprood 17
Chevrolet	JD Motorsports	15	Mike Skeen 1	Ronald Drake 11; Tevin Bair 1 Paul Clapprood 17
Chevrolet	JD Motorsports	15	Katherine Legge 4	Ronald Drake 11; Tevin Bair 1 Paul Clapprood 17
Chevrolet	JD Motorsports	15	Quin Houff 4	Bryan Berry
Chevrolet	Jeremy Clements Racing	51	Jeremy Clements	Danny Gill
Chevrolet	Jimmy Means Racing	52	David Starr	Tim Brown
Chevrolet	JR Motorsports	1	Elliott Sadler	Kevin Meendering
Chevrolet	JR Motorsports	5	Michael Annett	Jason Stockert 19; Travis Mack 14
Chevrolet	JR Motorsports	7	Justin Allgaier	Jason Burdett 31; Bill Wilburn 2
Chevrolet	JR Motorsports	9	Tyler Reddick (R)	Dave Elenz 32; Mike Bumgarner 1
Chevrolet	Kaulig Racing	11	Ryan Truex	Chris Rice
Chevrolet	Richard Childress Racing	2	Matt Tifft	Randall Burnett
Chevrolet	Richard Childress Racing	3	Austin Dillon 6	Danny Lawrence 1 Brandon Thomas 4 Nick Harrison 28
Chevrolet	Richard Childress Racing	3	Ty Dillon 8	Danny Lawrence 1 Brandon Thomas 4 Nick Harrison 28
Chevrolet	Richard Childress Racing	3	Shane Lee 13	Danny Lawrence 1 Brandon Thomas 4 Nick Harrison 28
Chevrolet	Richard Childress Racing	3	Jeb Burton 3	Danny Lawrence 1 Brandon Thomas 4 Nick Harrison 28
Chevrolet	Richard Childress Racing	3	Brendan Gaughan 3	Danny Lawrence 1 Brandon Thomas 4 Nick Harrison 28
Chevrolet	Richard Childress Racing	21	Daniel Hemric	Danny Stockman Jr.
Chevrolet	Brandonbilt Motorsports	38	Brian Henderson 1	Adam Brenner 1
Chevrolet	B. J. McLeod Motorsports	38	Angela Ruch 1	R. B. Bracken 2 Tony Wilson 7 Kyle Johnson 1 Todd Myers 21; Kevin Starland 1
Chevrolet	RSS Racing	38	Jeff Green 6	R. B. Bracken 2 Tony Wilson 7 Kyle Johnson 1 Todd Myers 21; Kevin Starland 1
Chevrolet	RSS Racing	38	J. J. Yeley 23	R. B. Bracken 2 Tony Wilson 7 Kyle Johnson 1 Todd Myers 21; Kevin Starland 1
Chevrolet	RSS Racing	38	Ryan Sieg 2	R. B. Bracken 2 Tony Wilson 7 Kyle Johnson 1 Todd Myers 21; Kevin Starland 1
Chevrolet	RSS Racing	39	J. J. Yeley 2	Rod Sieg 1 Kevin Starland 31; Todd Myers 1
Chevrolet	RSS Racing	39	Ryan Sieg 30	Rod Sieg 1 Kevin Starland 31; Todd Myers 1
Chevrolet	RSS Racing	39	Angela Ruch 1	Rod Sieg 1 Kevin Starland 31; Todd Myers 1
Chevrolet	RSS Racing	93	Ryan Sieg 1	Kyle Johnson 31; Tony Wilson 2
Chevrolet	RSS Racing	93	J. J. Yeley 5	Kyle Johnson 31; Tony Wilson 2
Chevrolet	RSS Racing	93	Jeff Green 26	Kyle Johnson 31; Tony Wilson 2
Chevrolet	RSS Racing	93	Stephen Leicht 1	Kyle Johnson 31; Tony Wilson 2
Chevrolet	SS-Green Light Racing	76	Spencer Boyd (R)	Jason Miller
Ford	Roush Fenway Racing	16	Ryan Reed	Phil Gould
Ford	Roush Fenway Racing	60	Austin Cindric (R) 9	Mike Kelley
Ford	Roush Fenway Racing	60	Chase Briscoe 12	Mike Kelley
Ford	Roush Fenway Racing	60	Ty Majeski 12	Mike Kelley
Ford	Stewart–Haas Racing with Biagi–DenBeste	00	Cole Custer	Jeff Meendering 31; Bruce Schlicker 2
Ford	Team Penske	22	Joey Logano 5	Brian Wilson
Ford	Team Penske	22	Ryan Blaney 4	Brian Wilson
Ford	Team Penske	22	Brad Keselowski 4	Brian Wilson
Ford	Team Penske	22	Austin Cindric (R) 16	Brian Wilson
Ford	Team Penske	22	Paul Menard 4	Brian Wilson
Toyota	Joe Gibbs Racing	18	Daniel Suárez 2	Eric Phillips 32; Dustin Zacharyasz 1
Toyota	Joe Gibbs Racing	18	Kyle Benjamin 3	Eric Phillips 32; Dustin Zacharyasz 1
Toyota	Joe Gibbs Racing	18	Kyle Busch 7	Eric Phillips 32; Dustin Zacharyasz 1
Toyota	Joe Gibbs Racing	18	Ryan Preece 15	Eric Phillips 32; Dustin Zacharyasz 1
Toyota	Joe Gibbs Racing	18	Noah Gragson 3	Eric Phillips 32; Dustin Zacharyasz 1
Toyota	Joe Gibbs Racing	18	Riley Herbst 1	Eric Phillips 32; Dustin Zacharyasz 1
Toyota	Joe Gibbs Racing	18	James Davison 1	Eric Phillips 32; Dustin Zacharyasz 1
Toyota	Joe Gibbs Racing	18	Denny Hamlin 1	Eric Phillips 32; Dustin Zacharyasz 1
Toyota	Joe Gibbs Racing	19	Brandon Jones	Chris Gabehart
Toyota	Joe Gibbs Racing	20	Christopher Bell (R)	Jason Ratcliff 32; Wesley Sherrill 1
Toyota	JP Motorsports	45	Josh Bilicki (R) 32	Jason Houghtaling 2 David Jones 1 Rob Winfield 1 Chuck Herman 3 Brown Jen 1 Glenn Kania 1 William Whitley 2 Terry Elmore 18; Kase Kallenbach 1 Jerry Hattaway 2 Riley Higgins 1
Toyota	JP Motorsports	45	Bayley Currey 1 (Note: Josh Bilicki was originally scheduled to drive the No. 45 in the O'Reilly Auto Parts 300 but crashed his only car in Practice. So Currey scheduled to drive the No. 55 car, that was renumbered to No. 45 since the No. 45 was better in Owners' Standings and the No. 55 entry withdrew.)	Jason Houghtaling 2 David Jones 1 Rob Winfield 1 Chuck Herman 3 Brown Jen 1 Glenn Kania 1 William Whitley 2 Terry Elmore 18; Kase Kallenbach 1 Jerry Hattaway 2 Riley Higgins 1
Chevrolet 31 Toyota 2	B. J. McLeod Motorsports	8	Caesar Bacarella 4	George Ingram 19; Keith Wolfe 12; Joe Lax 1 Adam Brooks 1
Chevrolet 31 Toyota 2	B. J. McLeod Motorsports	8	Tommy Joe Martins 12	George Ingram 19; Keith Wolfe 12; Joe Lax 1 Adam Brooks 1
Chevrolet 31 Toyota 2	B. J. McLeod Motorsports	8	Bayley Currey 1	George Ingram 19; Keith Wolfe 12; Joe Lax 1 Adam Brooks 1
Chevrolet 31 Toyota 2	B. J. McLeod Motorsports	8	Ray Black Jr. 7	George Ingram 19; Keith Wolfe 12; Joe Lax 1 Adam Brooks 1
Chevrolet 31 Toyota 2	B. J. McLeod Motorsports	8	Blake Jones 2	George Ingram 19; Keith Wolfe 12; Joe Lax 1 Adam Brooks 1
Chevrolet 31 Toyota 2	B. J. McLeod Motorsports	8	Angela Ruch 1	George Ingram 19; Keith Wolfe 12; Joe Lax 1 Adam Brooks 1
Chevrolet 31 Toyota 2	B. J. McLeod Motorsports	8	Scott Heckert 2	George Ingram 19; Keith Wolfe 12; Joe Lax 1 Adam Brooks 1
Chevrolet 31 Toyota 2	B. J. McLeod Motorsports	8	Cody Ware 1	George Ingram 19; Keith Wolfe 12; Joe Lax 1 Adam Brooks 1
Chevrolet 31 Toyota 2	B. J. McLeod Motorsports	8	Dylan Murcott 1	George Ingram 19; Keith Wolfe 12; Joe Lax 1 Adam Brooks 1
Chevrolet 31 Toyota 2	B. J. McLeod Motorsports	8	Matt Mills (R) 1	George Ingram 19; Keith Wolfe 12; Joe Lax 1 Adam Brooks 1
Chevrolet 31 Toyota 2	B. J. McLeod Motorsports	8	Jairo Avila Jr. 1	George Ingram 19; Keith Wolfe 12; Joe Lax 1 Adam Brooks 1
Chevrolet 29 Toyota 4	B. J. McLeod Motorsports	78	Ryan Ellis 2	Joe Lax 1 George Ingram 14; Keith Wolfe 17; Adam Brooks 1
Chevrolet 29 Toyota 4	B. J. McLeod Motorsports	78	B. J. McLeod 10	Joe Lax 1 George Ingram 14; Keith Wolfe 17; Adam Brooks 1
Chevrolet 29 Toyota 4	B. J. McLeod Motorsports	78	Ray Black Jr. 1	Joe Lax 1 George Ingram 14; Keith Wolfe 17; Adam Brooks 1
Chevrolet 29 Toyota 4	B. J. McLeod Motorsports	78	Tommy Joe Martins 7	Joe Lax 1 George Ingram 14; Keith Wolfe 17; Adam Brooks 1
Chevrolet 29 Toyota 4	B. J. McLeod Motorsports	78	Scott Heckert 1	Joe Lax 1 George Ingram 14; Keith Wolfe 17; Adam Brooks 1
Chevrolet 29 Toyota 4	B. J. McLeod Motorsports	78	Blake Jones 2	Joe Lax 1 George Ingram 14; Keith Wolfe 17; Adam Brooks 1
Chevrolet 29 Toyota 4	B. J. McLeod Motorsports	78	Jairo Avila Jr. 1	Joe Lax 1 George Ingram 14; Keith Wolfe 17; Adam Brooks 1
Chevrolet 29 Toyota 4	B. J. McLeod Motorsports	78	Cody Ware 1	Joe Lax 1 George Ingram 14; Keith Wolfe 17; Adam Brooks 1
Chevrolet 29 Toyota 4	B. J. McLeod Motorsports	78	Cole Rouse 1	Joe Lax 1 George Ingram 14; Keith Wolfe 17; Adam Brooks 1
Chevrolet 29 Toyota 4	B. J. McLeod Motorsports	78	Matt Mills (R) 1	Joe Lax 1 George Ingram 14; Keith Wolfe 17; Adam Brooks 1
Chevrolet 29 Toyota 4	B. J. McLeod Motorsports	78	Vinnie Miller (R) 6	Joe Lax 1 George Ingram 14; Keith Wolfe 17; Adam Brooks 1
Toyota 30 Chevrolet 1 Dodge 2	MBM Motorsports	40	Chad Finchum (R) 32	George Church 9 Mike Hillman 1 Robert Scott 2 James Blankenship 2 Brian Keselowski 14; Josh Reaume 5
Toyota 30 Chevrolet 1 Dodge 2	MBM Motorsports	40	Carl Long 1	George Church 9 Mike Hillman 1 Robert Scott 2 James Blankenship 2 Brian Keselowski 14; Josh Reaume 5
Toyota 8 Dodge 19 Chevrolet 5 Ford 1	MBM Motorsports	66	Timmy Hill 18	Sebastian Laforge 24; Clinton Cram 2 Gary Showalter 1 Steven Idol 1 Robert Scott 5
Toyota 8 Dodge 19 Chevrolet 5 Ford 1	MBM Motorsports	66	Carl Long 6	Sebastian Laforge 24; Clinton Cram 2 Gary Showalter 1 Steven Idol 1 Robert Scott 5
Toyota 8 Dodge 19 Chevrolet 5 Ford 1	MBM Motorsports	66	Stan Mullis 2	Sebastian Laforge 24; Clinton Cram 2 Gary Showalter 1 Steven Idol 1 Robert Scott 5
Toyota 8 Dodge 19 Chevrolet 5 Ford 1	MBM Motorsports	66	John Jackson 1	Sebastian Laforge 24; Clinton Cram 2 Gary Showalter 1 Steven Idol 1 Robert Scott 5
Toyota 8 Dodge 19 Chevrolet 5 Ford 1	MBM Motorsports	66	Tim Cowen 1	Sebastian Laforge 24; Clinton Cram 2 Gary Showalter 1 Steven Idol 1 Robert Scott 5
Toyota 8 Dodge 19 Chevrolet 5 Ford 1	MBM Motorsports	66	Brandon Hightower 1	Sebastian Laforge 24; Clinton Cram 2 Gary Showalter 1 Steven Idol 1 Robert Scott 5
Toyota 8 Dodge 19 Chevrolet 5 Ford 1	MBM Motorsports	66	Bobby Dale Earnhardt 2	Sebastian Laforge 24; Clinton Cram 2 Gary Showalter 1 Steven Idol 1 Robert Scott 5
Toyota 8 Dodge 19 Chevrolet 5 Ford 1	MBM Motorsports	66	Akinori Ogata 1	Sebastian Laforge 24; Clinton Cram 2 Gary Showalter 1 Steven Idol 1 Robert Scott 5
Toyota 8 Dodge 19 Chevrolet 5 Ford 1	MBM Motorsports	66	Chad Finchum (R) 1	Sebastian Laforge 24; Clinton Cram 2 Gary Showalter 1 Steven Idol 1 Robert Scott 5
Chevrolet	B. J. McLeod Motorsports	74	Ray Black Jr. 1	Robert Scott 6 Jason Houghtaling 8 Tim Goulet 18; Kyle Warner 1
Dodge 9 Chevrolet 23	Mike Harmon Racing	74	Mike Harmon 25	Robert Scott 6 Jason Houghtaling 8 Tim Goulet 18; Kyle Warner 1
Dodge 9 Chevrolet 23	Mike Harmon Racing	74	Cody Ware 1	Robert Scott 6 Jason Houghtaling 8 Tim Goulet 18; Kyle Warner 1
Dodge 9 Chevrolet 23	Mike Harmon Racing	74	B. J. McLeod 1	Robert Scott 6 Jason Houghtaling 8 Tim Goulet 18; Kyle Warner 1
Dodge 9 Chevrolet 23	Mike Harmon Racing	74	Stephen Leicht 4	Robert Scott 6 Jason Houghtaling 8 Tim Goulet 18; Kyle Warner 1
Dodge 9 Chevrolet 23	Mike Harmon Racing	74	Tim Viens 1	Robert Scott 6 Jason Houghtaling 8 Tim Goulet 18; Kyle Warner 1

=== Limited schedule ===
Manufacturer	Team	No.	Race driver	Crew chief	Rounds
Chevrolet	Brandonbilt Motorsports	86	Brandon Brown	Adam Brenner	2
Chevrolet	Cody Lane Racing	27	Cody Lane	Timmy Sliva	1
Chevrolet	Chris Cockrum Racing	25	Chris Cockrum	Jeff Spraker	1
Chevrolet	King Autosport	92	Dexter Bean	Thomas Bear	1
Chevrolet	King Autosport	92	Josh Williams	John Holmes	1
Chevrolet	GMS Racing	24	Justin Haley	Kevin Bellicourt	2
Chevrolet	JR Motorsports	88	Chase Elliott	Scott Radel	1
Chevrolet	JR Motorsports	88	Dale Earnhardt Jr.	Mike Bumgarner	1
Chevrolet	Jimmy Means Racing	79	Josh Reaume	Jordy Braden	1
Chevrolet	Kaulig Racing	10	Austin Dillon	Chad Kendrick	1
Chevrolet	Niece Motorsports	17	Victor Gonzalez Jr.	Adam Crigger	1
Chevrolet	Obaika Racing	97	Tanner Berryhill	Dan Stillman	1
Chevrolet	RSS Racing	37	J. J. Yeley	Justen Kraemer	1
Chevrolet	RSS Racing	37	Jeff Green	Justen Kraemer	1
Chevrolet	Shepherd Racing Ventures	89	Morgan Shepherd	Nick Hoechst	27
Chevrolet	Shepherd Racing Ventures	89	Landon Cassill	Nick Hoechst	1
Ford	Fury Race Cars	61	Kaz Grala (R)	Shane Wilson 19; Rick Markle 1	12
Ford	JGL Racing	24	Kaz Grala (R)	Shane Wilson 19; Rick Markle 1	10
Ford	JGL Racing	28	Dylan Lupton	Rick Markle 6 Steven Lane 6	11
Ford	JGL Racing	28	Tony Mrakovich	Rick Markle 6 Steven Lane 6	1
Ford	Roush Fenway Racing	6	Conor Daly	Kevin Kidd	1
Ford	Stewart–Haas Racing with Biagi–DenBeste	98	Aric Almirola	Richard Boswell	2
Ford	Stewart–Haas Racing with Biagi–DenBeste	98	Kevin Harvick	Richard Boswell	5
Ford	Stewart–Haas Racing with Biagi–DenBeste	98	Chase Briscoe	Richard Boswell	5
Ford	Team Penske	12	Austin Cindric (R)	Matt Swiderski	8
Ford	Team Penske	12	Brad Keselowski	Matt Swiderski	1
Ford	Tullman-Walker Racing	26	Max Tullman	Doug Richert	4
Toyota	JP Motorsports	55	Stephen Leicht	David Jones 4 Jason Houghtaling 1 Jerry Hattaway 1 Tim Silva 5 Chuck Herman 5 Terry Elmore 1 Kase Kallenbach 12; R.B. Bracken 2	9
Toyota	JP Motorsports	55	Jennifer Jo Cobb	David Jones 4 Jason Houghtaling 1 Jerry Hattaway 1 Tim Silva 5 Chuck Herman 5 Terry Elmore 1 Kase Kallenbach 12; R.B. Bracken 2	1
Toyota	JP Motorsports	55	Brandon Hightower	David Jones 4 Jason Houghtaling 1 Jerry Hattaway 1 Tim Silva 5 Chuck Herman 5 Terry Elmore 1 Kase Kallenbach 12; R.B. Bracken 2	7
Toyota	JP Motorsports	55	Bayley Currey	David Jones 4 Jason Houghtaling 1 Jerry Hattaway 1 Tim Silva 5 Chuck Herman 5 Terry Elmore 1 Kase Kallenbach 12; R.B. Bracken 2	12
Toyota	JP Motorsports	55	Peter Shepherd III	David Jones 4 Jason Houghtaling 1 Jerry Hattaway 1 Tim Silva 5 Chuck Herman 5 Terry Elmore 1 Kase Kallenbach 12; R.B. Bracken 2	1
Toyota	JP Motorsports	55	Dylan Murcott	David Jones 4 Jason Houghtaling 1 Jerry Hattaway 1 Tim Silva 5 Chuck Herman 5 Terry Elmore 1 Kase Kallenbach 12; R.B. Bracken 2	1
Toyota	JP Motorsports	55	James French	David Jones 4 Jason Houghtaling 1 Jerry Hattaway 1 Tim Silva 5 Chuck Herman 5 Terry Elmore 1 Kase Kallenbach 12; R.B. Bracken 2	1
Toyota	MBM Motorsports	72	Timmy Hill	Josh Reaume	1
Toyota	MBM Motorsports	72	John Jackson	Josh Reaume	1
Toyota	NXT Motorsports	54	Gray Gaulding	Rick Bourgeois	1
Toyota 2 Chevrolet 6	B. J. McLeod Motorsports	99	Ray Black Jr.	Keith Wolfe 1 Joe Lax 2	2
Toyota 2 Chevrolet 6	B. J. McLeod Motorsports	99	B. J. McLeod	Keith Wolfe 1 Joe Lax 2	1
Toyota 2 Chevrolet 6	B. J. McLeod Motorsports	99	Stephen Leicht	Robbie Freeman	5
Toyota 12 Dodge 4	MBM Motorsports	13	Timmy Hill	Sebastian Laforge 2 Brandon Mosley 10; Robert Scott 3	11
Toyota 12 Dodge 4	MBM Motorsports	13	John Jackson	Sebastian Laforge 2 Brandon Mosley 10; Robert Scott 3	1
Toyota 12 Dodge 4	MBM Motorsports	13	Stan Mullis	Sebastian Laforge 2 Brandon Mosley 10; Robert Scott 3	1
Toyota 12 Dodge 4	MBM Motorsports	13	Landon Cassill	Sebastian Laforge 2 Brandon Mosley 10; Robert Scott 3	1
Toyota 12 Dodge 4	MBM Motorsports	13	Carl Long	Sebastian Laforge 2 Brandon Mosley 10; Robert Scott 3	1
Toyota 12 Dodge 4	MBM Motorsports	13	Tyler Hill	Sebastian Laforge 2 Brandon Mosley 10; Robert Scott 3	1

=== Changes ===
==== Teams ====
- On October 23, 2017, it was announced that Biagi–DenBeste Racing would end their partnership with Richard Petty Motorsports and create a new alliance with Stewart–Haas Racing. The team was then called Stewart–Haas Racing with Biagi–DenBeste. The team fielded 2 teams. Cole Custer drove the No. 00 Ford Mustang GT full-time for a second consecutive season. The No. 41 team was renumbered as the No. 98 team and ran part-time with Kevin Harvick, Chase Briscoe, and Aric Almirola. In 2017, Biagi-DenBeste Racing fielded the No. 98 Ford, running part-time with drivers Aric Almirola, Casey Mears, and Bubba Wallace
- With their switch from Toyota to Ford, it was also announced that JGL Racing would have a technical alliance with Roush Fenway Racing.
- Richard Childress Racing shut down two teams: the No. 33 and the No. 62.
- Precision Performance Motorsports shut down its No. 46 team to move to the Continental Tire SportsCar Challenge.
- JGL Racing reopened the No. 28 entry for at least 21 races for Dylan Lupton, after shutting down this car at the end of 2017 because of a lack of sponsorship (with Dakoda Armstrong). They also tried to expand the schedule to the full season.
- Go Green Racing returned to the Xfinity Series full-time, fielding the No. 35 entry with Joey Gase as their driver. This was Go Green's first season in the Xfinity Series since 2013 and their first in NASCAR following their merger with FAS Lane Racing to create Go Fas Racing in December 2013.
- JD Motorsports announced a fourth full-time ride, the No. 15 entry initially to be split by veteran drivers including Joe Nemechek and Reed Sorenson. However, this plan was cancelled because Matt Mills was expected to drive the No. 15 car full-time, except the inaugural Daytona race, which had Nemechek behind the wheel.
- JP Motorsports purchased cars from TriStar Motorsports and announced their intentions to run a full season in the No. 55 Toyota Camry on January 18, 2018. At the time of the announcement, Jason Houghtaling was named as crew chief but other information like drivers and sponsors was not immediately released, however Stephen Leicht was later revealed as the full-time driver. On February 5, it was announced that they had acquired an additional Joe Gibbs Racing chassis and would field another full-time team, the No. 45, with Josh Bilicki as the driver.
- B. J. McLeod Motorsports announced that the partnership with SS-Green Light Racing to field the No. 99 full-time was finished. As a consequence, the No. 99 car would likely return to part-time racing.
- NextGen Motorsports increased their 2018 schedule as they would fielding for multiple drivers. The car number is TBA, due to JP Motorsports taking their No. 55.
- DGM Racing announced that Alex Labbé would drive the full Season in 2018 with a Chevrolet. The car was built by Richard Childress Racing and prepared by King Autosport. Former driver in King Autosport Mario Gosselin will be his crew chief. Alex Labbé was the 2017 NASCAR Pinty's Series champion with the No. 32 car for Go Fas Racing.
- New team NXT Motorsports announced that Gray Gaulding will drive the season-opener at Daytona with a Toyota. The team has acquired cars from Joe Gibbs Racing.
- RSS Racing used three cars in the season-opener: The No. 38 for Jeff Green, No. 39 for J. J. Yeley and No. 93 for owner Ryan Sieg without start-and-park for any of them. It looks that the team will use these three cars full-time in 2018. Last year, Sieg drove the No. 39 Chevrolet full-time, while the Nos. 38 and 93 were a part-time start-and-park team, driven by Green, Gray Gaulding and Stephen Leicht.

==== Drivers ====
- On April 25, 2017, it was announced Dale Earnhardt Jr. would retire from full-time driving in the Monster Energy NASCAR Cup Series (MENCS), but also announced he intends to participate in two races for JR Motorsports in the Xfinity Series. He has confirmed the second Richmond race as one of the two races. Chase Elliott will drive the No. 88 in the season-opener at Daytona.
- On September 14, 2017, it was announced that Tyler Reddick would be driving full-time for JR Motorsports in 2018, driving the No. 9 Chevrolet Camaro SS. He replaces William Byron who will be driving the No. 24 Hendrick Motorsports Chevrolet in the MENCS. In 2017, Reddick drove the No. 42 Chevrolet part-time for Chip Ganassi Racing, sharing the ride with Kyle Larson, Justin Marks, and Alex Bowman.
- On October 5, 2017, it was announced that Matt Tifft would be leaving Joe Gibbs Racing at the end of 2017, and joining Richard Childress Racing in 2018 to drive the No. 2 Chevrolet. In 2017, Tifft drove the No. 19 Toyota Camry for Joe Gibbs Racing.
- On October 13, 2017, it was announced that Christopher Bell would drive full-time for Joe Gibbs Racing in 2018, driving the No. 20 Toyota. Bell will also be competing for Rookie of the Year Honors. In 2017, Bell drove the No. 4 Toyota Tundra full-time for Kyle Busch Motorsports in the NASCAR Camping World Truck Series, winning the championship in the process, and part-time for Joe Gibbs Racing in the Xfinity Series, driving the No. 18 & No. 20 Toyotas.
- On October 19, 2017, it was announced that Spencer Boyd would drive full-time in 2018 for SS-Green Light Racing in a renumbered No. 76 car, crew chief Jason Miller and sponsorship from Grunt Style. In 2017, Boyd ran part-time in SS-Green Light's No. 07 entry and part-time in the NASCAR Camping World Truck Series for several teams.
- In October 2017, it was announced that Joey Gase will not return to Jimmy Means Racing. Gase will explore more opportunities in the Cup Series.
- On November 15, 2017, it was announced that Brandon Jones would be joining Joe Gibbs Racing to drive the No. 19 Toyota, replacing Matt Tifft. In 2017, Jones drove the No. 33 Chevrolet for Richard Childress Racing, as well as the No. 99 MDM Motorsports Chevrolet Silverado in the NASCAR Camping World Truck Series.
- On November 15, 2017, it was announced that Ryan Preece would be driving the No. 18 Joe Gibbs Racing Toyota in at least 10 races. Preece will share the ride with Monster Energy NASCAR Cup Series drivers Kyle Busch, Denny Hamlin, Erik Jones, and Daniel Suárez. In 2017, Preece drove in the NASCAR Whelen Modified Tour while also making a few starts for JGR, driving the No. 18 & No. 20 Toyotas. Preece won the July 2017 race at Iowa. On February 17, it was announced that Kyle Benjamin, who made 4 starts for Gibbs in 2017, would drive the No. 18 at Atlanta and Iowa in July. On April 13, it was announced that Noah Gragson, who currently drives the No. 18 Toyota Tundra for Kyle Busch Motorsports in the NASCAR Camping World Truck Series, would make his Xfinity Series debut at Richmond in April and will drive the car at Talladega in April and Dover in May. On June 11, it was announced that Riley Herbst who drives the No. 18 Toyota in the ARCA Series for Joe Gibbs would make his debut at Iowa in June.
- On November 17, 2017, it was announced that Kaz Grala will drive the No. 24 Ford Mustang GT for JGL Racing in 2018. Grala will also compete for Rookie of the Year Honors. In 2017, Grala drove the No. 33 Chevrolet Silverado for GMS Racing in the NASCAR Camping World Truck Series. However, due to a lack of sponsorship on May 15, 2018, it was announced that Grala announced he had been released by JGL as the team was shutting down its No. 24 car.
- On November 20, 2017, it was announced that Roush Fenway Racing would be running the No. 60 Ford full-time in 2018 as a developmental team in cooperation with Ford and Team Penske. Ty Majeski, Chase Briscoe, and Austin Cindric will all drive the No. 60. Briscoe and Majeski will drive the car for 12 races each and Cindric will drive for 9 races. This will be the first full-time season for the No. 60 team since winning the Championship with Chris Buescher in 2015. In 2017, Majeski drove part-time in the ARCA Racing Series while also making a few starts in the No. 60 for Roush, while Cindric and Briscoe drove full-time in the NASCAR Camping World Truck Series for the now defunct Brad Keselowski Racing, driving the No. 19 and No. 29 Ford F-150 respectively. Briscoe will also drive the No. 98 Ford for Stewart–Haas Racing with Biagi–DenBeste in 5 races at Bristol in April, Talladega in May, Both Charlotte Races, and the fall playoff race at Kansas.
- On December 11, 2017, it was announced that John Hunter Nemechek will drive the No. 42 Chevrolet for Chip Ganassi Racing part-time in 2018, sharing the ride with Kyle Larson and Jamie McMurray. In 2017, Nemechek drove the No. 8 NEMCO Motorsports Chevrolet Silverado in the NASCAR Camping World Truck Series.
- On January 5, 2018, it was announced that Joey Gase will drive a new No. 35 entry for Go Green Racing full-time in 2018. Gase last drove for Means Racing full-time in the Xfinity Series in 2017, as well as for Premium Motorsports and BK Racing part-time in the Cup Series. His crew chief will be Patrick Donahue, who worked with Gase at BK Racing.
- On January 9, 2018, it was announced that Kaulig Racing had released Blake Koch and that Ryan Truex would replace him in the No. 11 Chevrolet. In 2017, Truex raced full-time in the NASCAR Camping World Truck Series, driving the No. 16 Toyota Tundra for Hattori Racing Enterprises. This will be Truex's first full-time season in the Xfinity series after driving part-time for Michael Waltrip Racing in 2010 and 2011, Joe Gibbs Racing in 2011 and 2012, and Biagi-DenBeste Racing in 2015.
- On January 16, 2018, it was announced that Jamie McMurray will make his return to the Xfinity Series, in which he had not competed since 2013. He will drive part-time in the No. 42 car for Chip Ganassi Racing with Kyle Larson and John Hunter Nemechek.
- On January 24, 2018, it was announced that Shane Lee, Jeb Burton, and Brendan Gaughan would all drive part-time for Richard Childress Racing in 2018, driving the No. 3 Chevrolet. They will share the ride with MENCS drivers Austin Dillon and Ty Dillon. Lee will make his Xfinity series debut at Bristol in April, Burton will make his return at Richmond in April, and Gaughan will drive in the road course races at Mid-Ohio, Road America, and at Charlotte on the new Roval layout. In 2017, Lee drove full-time in the ARCA Racing Series for Cunningham Motorsports, Burton drove a part-time schedule in the Xfinity Series, driving the No. 24 Toyota for JGL Racing, while Gaughan competed full-time in the Xfinity Series, driving the No. 62 Chevrolet for Richard Childress Racing.
- On February 2, 2018, it was announced that Matt Mills will drive the No. 15 Chevrolet for JD Motorsports full-time starting at Atlanta. Mills most recently drove part-time for B. J. McLeod Motorsports, NextGen Motorsports, and Martins Motorsports in 2017. However he was released after DNQing at Texas, and again after running Pocono and Michigan. He would end up running the second races at Richmond and Dover with B.J. Mcleod Motorsports.
- On February 7, 2018 Jimmy Means Racing announced that David Starr will drive the No. 52 car full-time.
- On February 8, 2018, it was revealed that Austin Cindric would run a full schedule in the Xfinity Series. Cindric will drive for Penske Racing in either the Nos. 12 or 22 in all races in which he does not drive the No. 60 car for Roush Fenway Racing.
- On May 2, 2018, NASCAR announced that Spencer Gallagher was issued a substance abuse penalty and was suspended indefinitely. He also lost his playoff eligibility with the suspension. This came just a week after Gallagher scored his first NASCAR win at Talladega. Johnny Sauter was announced as his replacement for Dover and Chase Elliott will drive the car at Charlotte, Pocono, Chicago, Daytona, and Bristol and Alex Bowman will drive the car at Michigan . Justin Haley, who drives the No. 24 Chevrolet Silverado in the NASCAR Camping World Truck Series for GMS Racing, drove the No. 23 at Iowa in June, and will also a drive a 2nd GMS Car at Daytona in July and Watkins Glen. On July 4, 2018, Gallagher was reinstated and returned to the No. 23 car at Kentucky. On October 19, 2018, Gallagher announced his retirement from racing at the end of the season. He will take on a more managerial role in GMS racing starting in 2019.
- On May 7, 2018, it was announced that IndyCar Series driver Conor Daly will make his Xfinity Series debut at Road America driving the No. 6 Roush Fenway Racing Ford.
- On August 15, 2018, Elliott Sadler announced his retirement at the end of 2018. His replacement for 2019 onwards is Noah Gragson.

==== Crew chiefs ====
- Brian Wilson will take over the Crew Chief duties for the No. 22 Team Penske Ford Mustang GT after it was announced that Greg Erwin would be moving up to the Monster Energy NASCAR Cup Series to be Paul Menard's crew chief at Wood Brothers Racing.
- Jason Ratcliff will move over from the No. 20 MENCS team to the No. 20 Xfinity Series team to be the crew chief for Christopher Bell. Chris Gabehardt, who was the previous crew chief for the No. 20, will move over to the No. 19 team to be Brandon Jones' crew chief, replacing Matt Beckham.
- Chad Norris will take over as Crew Chief at GMS Racing for the No. 23 for Spencer Gallagher. Norris was the Crew Chief for Brennan Poole in the No. 48 at Chip Ganassi Racing in 2017.
- Shane Wilson will take over as Crew Chief at JGL Racing for the No. 24 for Kaz Grala. Wilson was the Crew Chief for Brendan Gaughan in the No. 62 at Richard Childress Racing in 2017.
- Jason Houghtaling will move from MBM Motorsports to JP Motorsports to crew chief the startup team's No. 55 entry.

==== Manufacturers ====
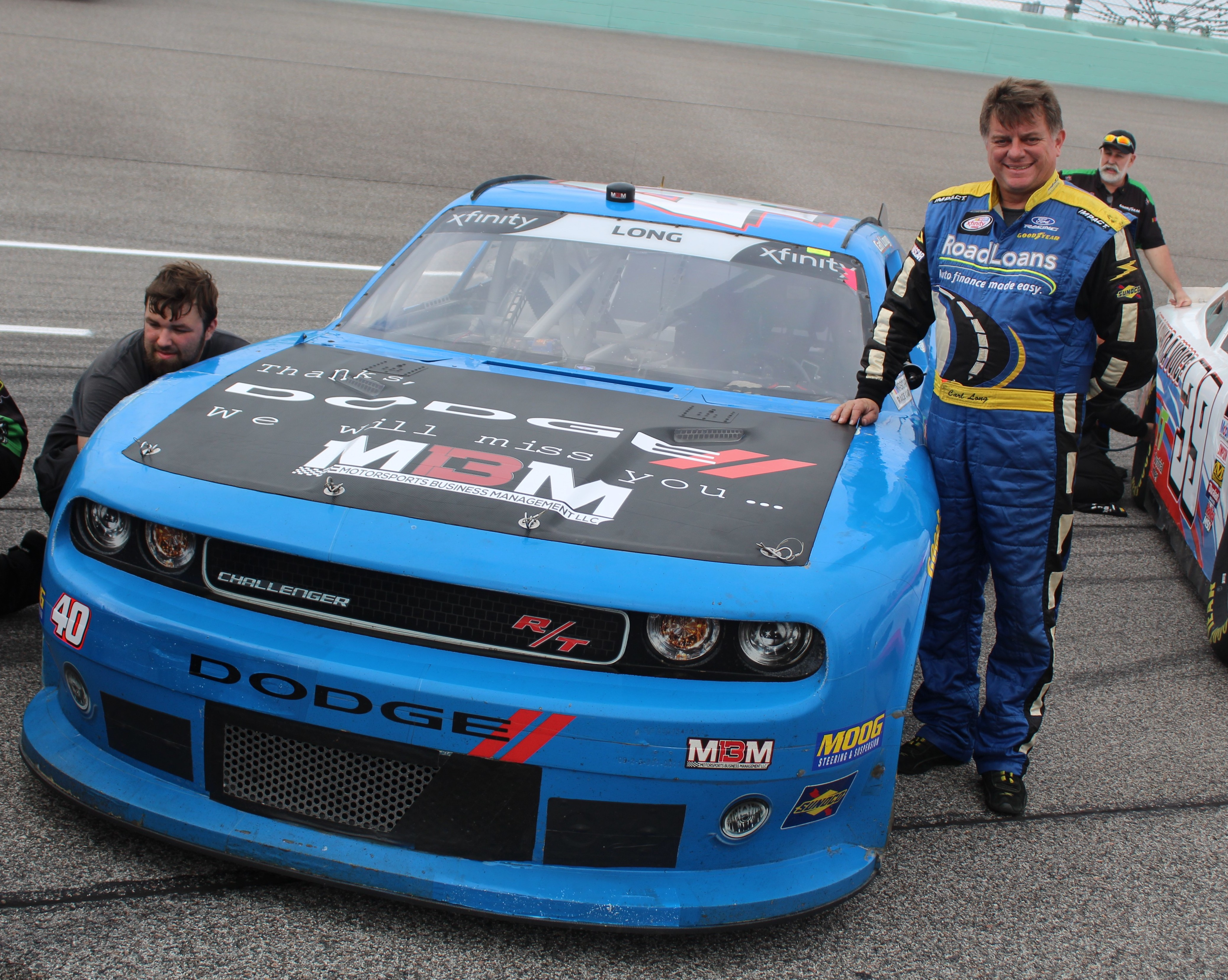
2018 was the final year with Dodge participation. For the season finale, Carl Long placed a tribute decal on his "Zombie Dodge" car.

- JGL Racing would switch from Toyota to Ford this season. JGL Racing had been running Toyota cars from 2015 to 2017.
- This was the final season of the Toyota Camry, which was replaced by the Supra in 2019.
- This was also the final season of Dodge as a manufacturer. In the 2013 season, Dodge stopped factory support after Penske Racing switched to Ford. Because of this, the former Penske Challengers used by smaller teams were nicknamed "Zombie Dodges". The new flange-fit composite body rules have made the welded steel-bodied Challengers ineligible to compete in 2019.

== Rule changes ==
- On July 31, 2017, NASCAR announced that drivers with more than five years of full-time racing on the Monster Energy NASCAR Cup level and registered as Monster Energy NASCAR Cup drivers for the 2018 season for points purposes may drive a maximum of seven Xfinity Series races. In addition, all full-time registered Monster Energy NASCAR Cup Series drivers were ineligible to drive in the Dash 4 Cash races as well as the final eight races of the season (the final race before the playoffs and the playoffs). Drivers who have declared eligibility for Xfinity Series points, regardless of Cup experience, can compete in those races.
- On November 1, 2017, NASCAR announced a series of Xfinity Series rule changes for 2018.
  - The 7/8 inch restrictor plate and aero ducts used at the Indianapolis Motor Speedway for the Lilly Diabetes 250 will also be used at Pocono and Michigan.
  - Teams may use the flange-fit composite body at 30 races—all except Daytona and Talladega.
  - Teams must use a NASCAR-specification flat splitter.
  - Teams must use a specification radiator.
  - Brake cooling hoses and fans will be reduced.
  - Teams must use a single transmission for the entire race meeting, however, this rule does not apply at the road course races. The standard splitter height is four inches.
  - The "black box" will be powered by the vehicle, not separate batteries.
  - As part of an investigation into the 2015 Alert Today Florida 300 Xfinity race crash that injured Kyle Busch, NASCAR imposed new chassis specifications (Enhanced Vehicle Chassis) for safety reasons that will be implemented in two phases.
    - Starting with the conclusion of the 2017 Monster Energy NASCAR Cup Series season, all new chassis must be certified to the new specification.
    - Currently constructed and certified chassis that had been certified as of the 2017 Ford EcoBoost 300 will have a one-year grace period until they must be certified.
- Starting from this season, drivers that declared eligibility to the Xfinity Series will have their last name featured in the front windshield of the car, with the Xfinity logo being reduced into two smaller logos in the upper corner area of the front windshield between the driver's name. Those who didn't declared eligibility to the series will only feature the Xfinity logo in the front windshield of their car.

== Schedule ==
The final schedule was released on May 23, 2017.

No.	Race title	Track	Location	Date
1	PowerShares QQQ 300	Daytona International Speedway	Daytona Beach, Florida	February 17
2	Rinnai 250	Atlanta Motor Speedway	Hampton, Georgia	February 24
3	Boyd Gaming 300	Las Vegas Motor Speedway	Las Vegas, Nevada	March 3
4	DC Solar 200	ISM Raceway	Avondale, Arizona	March 10
5	Roseanne 300	Auto Club Speedway	Fontana, California	March 17
6	My Bariatric Solutions 300	Texas Motor Speedway	Fort Worth, Texas	April 7
7	Fitzgerald Glider Kits 300	Bristol Motor Speedway	Bristol, Tennessee	April 14
8	ToyotaCare 250	Richmond Raceway	Richmond, Virginia	April 20
9	Sparks Energy 300	Talladega Superspeedway	Lincoln, Alabama	April 28
10	OneMain Financial 200	Dover International Speedway	Dover, Delaware	May 5
11	Alsco 300	Charlotte Motor Speedway	Concord, North Carolina	May 26
12	Pocono Green 250	Pocono Raceway	Long Pond, Pennsylvania	June 2
13	LTi Printing 250	Michigan International Speedway	Cambridge Township, Michigan	June 9
14	Iowa 250	Iowa Speedway	Newton, Iowa	June 17
15	Overton's 300	Chicagoland Speedway	Joliet, Illinois	June 30
16	Coca-Cola Firecracker 250	Daytona International Speedway	Daytona Beach, Florida	July 6
17	Alsco 300	Kentucky Speedway	Sparta, Kentucky	July 13
18	Lakes Region 200	New Hampshire Motor Speedway	Loudon, New Hampshire	July 21
19	U.S. Cellular 250	Iowa Speedway	Newton, Iowa	July 28
20	Zippo 200 at The Glen	Watkins Glen International	Watkins Glen, New York	August 4
21	Rock N Roll Tequila 170	Mid-Ohio Sports Car Course	Lexington, Ohio	August 11
22	Food City 300	Bristol Motor Speedway	Bristol, Tennessee	August 17
23	Johnsonville 180	Road America	Elkhart Lake, Wisconsin	August 25
24	Sport Clips Haircuts VFW 200	Darlington Raceway	Darlington, South Carolina	September 1
25	Lilly Diabetes 250	Indianapolis Motor Speedway	Speedway, Indiana	September 10
26	DC Solar 300	Las Vegas Motor Speedway	Las Vegas, Nevada	September 15
NASCAR Xfinity Series Playoffs
Round of 12
27	Go Bowling 250	Richmond Raceway	Richmond, Virginia	September 21
28	Drive for the Cure 200	Charlotte Motor Speedway (Roval)	Concord, North Carolina	September 29
29	Bar Harbor 200	Dover International Speedway	Dover, Delaware	October 6
Round of 8
30	Kansas Lottery 300	Kansas Speedway	Kansas City, Kansas	October 20
31	O'Reilly Auto Parts 300	Texas Motor Speedway	Fort Worth, Texas	November 3
32	Whelen Trusted to Perform 200	ISM Raceway	Avondale, Arizona	November 10
Championship 4
33	Ford EcoBoost 300	Homestead–Miami Speedway	Homestead, Florida	November 17

=== Schedule changes ===
In 2015, NASCAR and 24 Xfinity Series tracks agreed on a five-year contract that guarantees each track would continue to host races through 2020. Despite the agreement, Speedway Motorsports decided to transfer one of its Xfinity Series races at Kentucky Speedway to Las Vegas Motor Speedway to form a race weekend involving each of the three national series in the fall. With the official release of the schedule, NASCAR announced that the race Las Vegas Motor Speedway acquired from Kentucky Speedway will become the final race before the Xfinity Series playoffs, while the Go Bowling 250 at Richmond Raceway will be held as the first race of the playoffs. Furthermore, the Lilly Diabetes 250 at Indianapolis Motor Speedway will move from July to September. Chicagoland Speedway's race, the Overton's 300, will move from September to June to become the 15th race of the season instead of the 26th.

A few other minor schedule changes were also announced with the release of the schedule. Unlike the 2017 season, the OneMain Financial 200 at Dover International Speedway will precede the Alsco 300 at Charlotte Motor Speedway, while the Bar Harbor 200, also at Dover International Speedway, will move one week later to follow the Drive for the Cure 200 at Charlotte Motor Speedway. The Drive for the Cure 200 will also utilize Charlotte Motor Speedway's 2.28-mile (3.67 km) road course instead of its oval. Road America will also move back to a Saturday afternoon.

On August 25, NASCAR announced the tracks that will compose the Dash 4 Cash incentive program: The four Dash 4 Cash races will be run consecutively on the overall series schedule, starting at Bristol Motor Speedway on April 14. From there, the bonus program rolls on to Richmond Raceway (April 20) and Talladega (April 28) before concluding at Dover International Speedway on May 5. Drivers eligible for driver championship points in the Monster Energy NASCAR Cup Series are ineligible to participate in either Dash 4 Cash, the second Las Vegas race, or the playoff races. Drivers such as Elliott Sadler (13 years) and Dale Earnhardt Jr. (18 years), who are expected to register as Xfinity drivers, will be eligible since they are registering as Xfinity drivers.

== Results and standings ==
=== Race results ===
No.	Race	Pole position	Most laps led	Winning driver	Manufacturer	No.	Winning team
1	PowerShares QQQ 300	Daniel Hemric	Kyle Larson	Tyler Reddick	Chevrolet	9	JR Motorsports
2	Rinnai 250	Christopher Bell	Kevin Harvick	Kevin Harvick	Ford	98	Stewart–Haas Racing with Biagi–DenBeste
3	Boyd Gaming 300	Christopher Bell	Kyle Larson	Kyle Larson	Chevrolet	42	Chip Ganassi Racing
4	DC Solar 200	Justin Allgaier	Justin Allgaier	Brad Keselowski	Ford	22	Team Penske
5	Roseanne 300	Christopher Bell	Joey Logano	Joey Logano	Ford	22	Team Penske
6	My Bariatric Solutions 300	Ryan Blaney	Ryan Blaney	Ryan Blaney	Ford	22	Team Penske
7	Fitzgerald Glider Kits 300	Cole Custer	Brandon Jones	Ryan Preece	Toyota	18	Joe Gibbs Racing
8	ToyotaCare 250	Cole Custer	Christopher Bell	Christopher Bell	Toyota	20	Joe Gibbs Racing
9	Sparks Energy 300	Daniel Hemric	Daniel Hemric	Spencer Gallagher	Chevrolet	23	GMS Racing
10	OneMain Financial 200	Brandon Jones	Justin Allgaier	Justin Allgaier	Chevrolet	7	JR Motorsports
11	Alsco 300	Brad Keselowski	Kyle Busch	Brad Keselowski	Ford	22	Team Penske
12	Pocono Green 250	Cole Custer	Kyle Busch	Kyle Busch	Toyota	18	Joe Gibbs Racing
13	LTi Printing 250	Kyle Busch	Kyle Busch	Austin Dillon	Chevrolet	3	Richard Childress Racing
14	Iowa 250	Austin Cindric	Justin Allgaier	Justin Allgaier	Chevrolet	7	JR Motorsports
15	Overton's 300	Kyle Larson	Kyle Larson	Kyle Larson	Chevrolet	42	Chip Ganassi Racing
16	Coca-Cola Firecracker 250	Ryan Preece	Kyle Larson	Kyle Larson	Chevrolet	42	Chip Ganassi Racing
17	Alsco 300	Cole Custer	Kyle Busch	Christopher Bell	Toyota	20	Joe Gibbs Racing
18	Lakes Region 200	Brad Keselowski	Christopher Bell	Christopher Bell	Toyota	20	Joe Gibbs Racing
19	U.S. Cellular 250	Elliott Sadler	Cole Custer	Christopher Bell	Toyota	20	Joe Gibbs Racing
20	Zippo 200 at The Glen	Joey Logano	Joey Logano	Joey Logano	Ford	22	Team Penske
21	Rock N Roll Tequila 170	Austin Cindric	Austin Cindric	Justin Allgaier	Chevrolet	7	JR Motorsports
22	Food City 300	Kyle Busch	Kyle Larson	Kyle Larson	Chevrolet	42	Chip Ganassi Racing
23	Johnsonville 180	Matt Tifft	Justin Allgaier	Justin Allgaier	Chevrolet	7	JR Motorsports
24	Sport Clips Haircuts VFW 200	Ross Chastain	Ross Chastain	Brad Keselowski	Ford	22	Team Penske
25	Lilly Diabetes 250	Ryan Blaney	Justin Allgaier	Justin Allgaier	Chevrolet	7	JR Motorsports
26	DC Solar 300	Cole Custer	Ross Chastain	Ross Chastain	Chevrolet	42	Chip Ganassi Racing
NASCAR Xfinity Series Playoffs
Round of 12
27	Go Bowling 250	Christopher Bell	Dale Earnhardt Jr.	Christopher Bell	Toyota	20	Joe Gibbs Racing
28	Drive for the Cure 200	Austin Cindric	Chase Briscoe	Chase Briscoe	Ford	98	Stewart–Haas Racing with Biagi–DenBeste
29	Bar Harbor 200	Daniel Hemric	Christopher Bell	Christopher Bell	Toyota	20	Joe Gibbs Racing
Round of 8
30	Kansas Lottery 300	Daniel Hemric	Daniel Hemric	John Hunter Nemechek	Chevrolet	42	Chip Ganassi Racing
31	O'Reilly Auto Parts 300	Christopher Bell	Tyler Reddick	Cole Custer	Ford	00	Stewart–Haas Racing with Biagi–DenBeste
32	Whelen Trusted to Perform 200	John Hunter Nemechek	Christopher Bell	Christopher Bell	Toyota	20	Joe Gibbs Racing
Championship 4
33	Ford EcoBoost 300	Cole Custer	Cole Custer	Tyler Reddick	Chevrolet	9	JR Motorsports

=== Drivers' Championship ===
(key) Bold – Pole position awarded by time. Italics – Pole position set by final practice results or owner's points. * – Most laps led. ^{1} – Stage 1 winner. ^{2} – Stage 2 winner. ^{1–10} – Regular season top 10 finishers.
. – Eliminated after Round of 12 . – Eliminated after Round of 8

Pos	Driver	DAY	ATL	LVS	PHO	CAL	TEX	BRI	RCH	TAL	DOV	CLT	POC	MCH	IOW	CHI	DAY	KEN	NHA	IOW	GLN	MOH	BRI	ROA	DAR	IND	LVS	RCH	ROV	DOV	KAN	TEX	PHO	HOM	Pts.	Stage	Bonus
1	Tyler Reddick **(R)**	1	19	8	10	7	23	7	11	8	5	23	9	7	8	33^{1}	31	6	25	22	11	31	9	34	3	2	28	7	9	14	5	2*	6	1	4040	–	15^{7}
2	Cole Custer	14	39	9	8	6	4	**8**	**6**	9	13	2	**5**	3	4	3	25	**5**	9	9*^{1}	6	7	4	4	2	29	**3**	15	7	2	26	1^{2}	8	**2***^{12}	4035	–	13^{2}
3	Daniel Hemric	**26**	11	6	6	5	3	3	29^{1}	**23***^{1}	3	7	3	2	3	5	8	2	11	11	16	3	24	3^{2}	11	5^{2}	29	3^{1}	10^{1}	**7**^{2}	**2***^{1}	10^{1}	2	4	4033	–	13^{5}
4	Christopher Bell **(R)**	39	**3**	**2**^{1}	4	**21**	2	29^{1}	1*	12	4	3	36	11	2	12	3	1	1*^{1}	1^{2}	9	11	2	23	34	9	4	**1**	5^{2}	1*^{1}	37	**32**	1*	11	4026	–	44^{3}
NASCAR Xfinity Series Playoffs cut-off
Pos	Driver	DAY	ATL	LVS	PHO	CAL	TEX	BRI	RCH	TAL	DOV	CLT	POC	MCH	IOW	CHI	DAY	KEN	NHA	IOW	GLN	MOH	BRI	ROA	DAR	IND	LVS	RCH	ROV	DOV	KAN	TEX	PHO	HOM	Pts.	Stage	Bonus
5	Elliott Sadler	2	5	5	9	3	8	4	3^{2}	5^{2}	2^{1}	5	6	30^{2}	28	6	2	12	8	**6**	12	6	6	5	5	35	5	6	14	11	3	8	11	14	2255	28	11^{4}
6	Matt Tifft	19	12	11	7	8	6	35	4	25	8	9	14	16	9	16	20	11	5	26	37	4	10	**2**^{1}	8	6	36	5	6	15	6	7	3	10	2254	26	3^{9}
7	Justin Allgaier	31	6	3	**2***^{1}	2	35	2	14	3	1*^{2}	32	37	9	1*^{12}	7	9	4	7	2	3	1^{1}	3	1*	7	1*	2	32	15	3	38	5	24^{12}	7	2251	45	39^{1}
8	Austin Cindric **(R)**	40	7	34	16	28	8	12	5	30	9	16	4	23	**11**	14	33	10	17	18	13	**2***^{2}	14	37	40	34	9	13	**3**	8	39	3	4	5	2231	25	1
9	Brandon Jones	10	17	7	11	13	33^{2}	6*	10	2	**10**	15	24	18	5	11	12	36	6	12	7	23	29	9	12	10	7	8	22	6	36	6	7	8	2186	14	6^{6}
10	Ross Chastain	9	16	18	19	10	28	9	18	34	16	26	11	14	19	13	10	17	26	4	20	16	12	7	**25***^{12}	12	1*^{12}	2	12	13	25	11	15	16	2184	9	10^{10}
11	Ryan Reed	3	10	19	18	17	14	18	9	22	19	29	13	4	17	32	26	8	12	7	8	10	17	39	13	11	35	10	11	16	7	29	12	12	2170	8	–
12	Ryan Truex	7	9	15	15	12	13	10	7	38	11	6	10	10	14	15	13	13	13	8	18	5	22	25	15	22	8	11	16	10	11	33	13	15	2160	7	3^{8}
13	John Hunter Nemechek		4			29		13	13	7	14		7	13	15			7^{2}	4	5						25^{1}				9	1^{2}	4	**9**	3	643	165	8
14	Michael Annett	37	20	13	17	18	15	21	20	14	15	12	35	17	13	30	11	15	16	14	17	18	7	12	10	31	40	14	20	12	40	16	16	9	632	17	–
15	Jeremy Clements	16	27	22	20	15	16	40	8	35	18	35	15	15	20	17	34	18	18	20	14	17	13	13	16	14	13	16	18	20	10	14	17	19	619	9	–
16	Ryan Sieg	21	22	29	25	20	18	15	21	6	17	13	17	19	18	20	27	16	15	34	26	34	11	26	17	13	12	17	36	18	9	12	19	22	589	12	–
17	Alex Labbé **(R)**	24	18	17	22	19	32	11	16	24	21	34	18	37	23	21	15	32	23	16	19	9	23	16	19	19	16	21	13	21	12	30	20	21	540	–	–
18	Spencer Gallagher	6	14	10	14	11	10	5	17	1								20				8					10	12	19	5	33	9	10	17	524	48	5
19	Garrett Smithley	5	25	23	28	23	27	17	26	10	32	14	26	26	25	19	28	19	32	25	23	28	16	15	20	20	18	24	25	23	13	20	26	27	496	4	–
20	Joey Gase	33	26	20	24	16	20	16	22	21	20	17	19	39	21	22	32	33	22	17	22	24	18	19	21	15	15	22	23	30	15	22	22	23	495	–	–
21	Ryan Preece					9	5	1^{2}									39		3		4					28	6	18	4	4	21	32	5	6	483	106	6
22	Kaz Grala **(R)**	4	23	16	12	14	26	38	30	20	37	10	16	12	10	40	5		14		15	27		11					8					18	439	24	–
23	David Starr	17	28	35	39	26	21	24	35	32	26	20	20	33	24	23	35	23	28	19	33	21	21	36	36	18	32	20	27	24	17	24	27	28	352	–	–
24	Chase Briscoe		15				11	23	26	16		11	38			9				10		14	34			9	31		1*	19	30			13	334	9	5
25	Shane Lee							14		15			12		16		6			13							30	9		17	4	23	14	20	315	25	–
26	Spencer Boyd **(R)**	25	29	36	30	30	25	25	28	40	30	21	28	22	22	29	17	24	24	23	24	25	25	21	31	36	22	34	29	32	19	25	28	30	302	–	–
27	Vinnie Miller **(R)**	20	31	24	33	27	39	33	31	17	22	28	31	25	31	27	19	29	27	29	35	36	32	27	37	17	26	37	31	25	22	27	36	40	279	–	–
28	J. J. Yeley	18	37	38	21	34	31	37	15	11	36	36	34	20	40	18	16	34	36		34	32	40		30	30	11	25	40	33	35	15	21	36	276	7	–
29	B. J. McLeod		30	26	26	22	29	20	32	19	23	40	22	28	29	25	36	21	35				19		23	16	19			37	23	36	23	32	276	–	–
30	Chad Finchum **(R)**	28	35	32	36	36	34	36	34	39	25	DNQ	30	29	26	38	14	31	21	37	29	29	30	22	32	21	25	26	28	34	16	17	37	31	253	–	–
31	Tommy Joe Martins		33	25	27	24		26	23	18		24	25	24	32				20	21	40	19			22	27							35	26	216	–	–
32	Josh Williams	22	24	21	29	25	30	22		26		38	21	32	34	31	24	35		24			28		Wth	24	20				24			DNQ	208	–	–
33	Josh Bilicki **(R)**	DNQ	DNQ	28	32	32	24	32	33	28	29	25	29	27	36	35	40	28	34	40	32	20	35	30	28	38	27	30	24	31	20	Wth	34	DNQ	202	–	–
34	Ty Majeski							34		37	34	22			7			27						28				34	34		8	13	18		155	6	–
35	Ray Black Jr.	DNQ									27	19					22	22		28			37				17	23	26			19			131	–	–
36	Timmy Hill	DNQ	34	33	34	35	36	27	38	27	35	30	39	31	37	37	7	37	38		36		38	35	35	DNQ	34	38	32	27	31	35		35	119	–	–
37	Jeff Green	11	40	39	40	39	40	39	40	13	40	39	40	40	35	39	23	40	40	35	39	39	26	40	39	40	39	39	39	39	34	38	40	39	108	–	–
38	Mike Harmon	DNQ	DNQ	31	35	40	DNQ		36	33	DNQ	DNQ	33		38	DNQ	21	30	31	32					27	26	33	35		35	28	28	32		105	–	–
39	Dylan Lupton	27	21	40	23	33	17	31		36	24	33	23	Wth																					103	–	–
40	Kyle Benjamin		8																	3		13													102	15	–
41	Justin Marks																					22		6					2						99	18	–
42	Brandon Brown	36							19		28													Wth	18					22		18		24	94	–	–
43	Stephen Leicht	15	32	30	31	31	37	28	37		33									39	DNQ	37	31	33						40	32	37	38	DNQ	81	–	–
44	Brendan Gaughan																					12		24					17						71	13	–
45	Brandon Hightower											27	32	35	30	26	30	26		27						37									64	–	–
46	Andy Lally																					15		10					37						60	10	–
47	Jeb Burton								12		12					34																			60	7	–
48	Landon Cassill																								14		14		38	26				38	59	–	–
49	Quin Houff																											31			14	26	29	29	56	–	–
50	Dale Earnhardt Jr.																											4*^{2}							51	18	1
51	Katherine Legge																					30		14				28	33						46	3	–
52	Caesar Bacarella	13												34			38									23								34	45	–	–
53	Matt Mills **(R)**		36	27	38	37	DNQ						27	36														27		28					43	–	–
54	Jairo Avila Jr.																						20								18				36	–	–
55	Brian Henderson																				21			18											35	–	–
56	James Davison																							8											29	–	–
57	Ryan Ellis	30																						17											27	–	–
58	Max Tullman																			30^{†}							23				DNQ			25	26	–	–
59	Scott Heckert															28					30			29											24	–	–
60	Morgan Shepherd	DNQ	38	37	37	38	38	DNQ	39	DNQ	38	DNQ	DNQ	38	39	DNQ	Wth	38	39	38	Wth	38	39		38	32		40		38	DNQ	39	39		24	–	–
61	Casey Roderick																			15															22	–	–
62	Carl Long										39								37		Wth		33	32	33			36		36				33	21	–	–
63	Mason Diaz																											19							18	–	–
64	Bill Elliott																							20											17	–	–
65	Lawson Aschenbach																												21						17	1	–
66	Cole Rouse																										21								16	–	–
67	Donald Theetge																		33														25		16	–	–
68	Angela Ruch																		30												29			37	16	–	–
69	Tony Mrakovich							EX	24																										13	–	–
70	Bobby Dale Earnhardt																														27	34			13	–	–
71	Tim Cowen																					26													11	–	–
72	Mike Skeen																				28														9	–	–
73	Stan Mullis														33					33							37								9	–	–
74	Dylan Murcott																					40							30						8	–	–
75	Peter Shepherd III																			31															6	–	–
76	Victor Gonzalez Jr.																				31														6	–	–
77	Conor Daly																							31											6	–	–
78	Tyler Hill																																31		6	–	–
79	Akinori Ogata																																33		4	–	–
80	John Jackson															36						35					38								4	–	–
81	Dexter Bean																			36															1	–	–
82	James French																							38											1	–	–
	Chris Cockrum	DNQ																																	0	–	–
	Tanner Berryhill																												DNQ						0	–	–
	Tim Viens																																	DNQ	0	–	–
	Cody Lane																											Wth							0	–	–
Ineligible for Xfinity Series driver points
Pos	Driver	DAY	ATL	LVS	PHO	CAL	TEX	BRI	RCH	TAL	DOV	CLT	POC	MCH	IOW	CHI	DAY	KEN	NHA	IOW	GLN	MOH	BRI	ROA	DAR	IND	LVS	RCH	ROV	DOV	KAN	TEX	PHO	HOM	Pts.	Stage	Bonus
	Kyle Larson	29*^{1}		1*^{2}												**1***^{2}	1*^{12}				27		1*^{12}														
	Brad Keselowski				1							**1**							**2**^{2}		10				1												
	Joey Logano	34	2			1*^{12}															**1***^{1}		5														
	Kevin Harvick		1*^{12}				19							8		2									29												
	Ryan Blaney			4			**1***^{1}										4*									3											
	Kyle Busch			14	3^{2}							8*^{12}	1*^{1}	6*^{1}				3*^{1}					**36**														
	Austin Dillon	32		12		4								1					10		25					8											
	Chase Elliott	12^{2}										37	2			10	29						8		6	4											
	Noah Gragson								2	4	7																										
	A. J. Allmendinger																				2^{2}																
	Daniel Suárez	8														4																					
	Ty Dillon		13		13		12					4						14					15		9	33											
	Denny Hamlin																								4												
	Jamie McMurray				5		7					31																									
	Paul Menard												8^{2}	5		8		9																			
	Aric Almirola	35																			5																
	Johnny Sauter										6								19																		
	Riley Herbst														6																						
	Justin Haley														12		18				38																
	Joe Nemechek	23						19	25	31	31	18																									
	Bayley Currey						22												29				27		26	39	24	29	35	29	DNQ	21	30	DNQ			
	Alex Bowman													21																							
	Blake Jones														27	24	37	25																			
	Cody Ware							30														33			24												
	Jennifer Jo Cobb									29																											
	Gray Gaulding	38																																			
	Josh Reaume																	39																			
Pos	Driver	DAY	ATL	LVS	PHO	CAL	TEX	BRI	RCH	TAL	DOV	CLT	POC	MCH	IOW	CHI	DAY	KEN	NHA	IOW	GLN	MOH	BRI	ROA	DAR	IND	LVS	RCH	ROV	DOV	KAN	TEX	PHO	HOM	Pts.	Stage	Bonus
^{†} – Max Tullman started receiving points at Las Vegas 2.

=== Owners' championship (Top 15) ===
(key) Bold - Pole position awarded by time. Italics - Pole position set by final practice results or rainout. * – Most laps led. ^{1} – Stage 1 winner. ^{2} – Stage 2 winner. ^{1–10} – Owners' regular season top 10 finishers.
. – Eliminated after Round of 12 . – Eliminated after Round of 8

Pos.	No.	Car Owner	DAY	ATL	LVS	PHO	CAL	TEX	BRI	RCH	TAL	DOV	CLT	POC	MCH	IOW	CHI	DAY	KEN	NHA	IOW	GLN	MOH	BRI	ROA	DAR	IND	LVS	RCH	ROV	DOV	KAN	TEX	PHO	HOM	Points	Bonus
1	00	Gene Haas	14	39	9	8	6	4	**8**	**6**	9	13	2	**5**	3	4	3	25	**5**	9	9*^{1}	6	7	4	4	2	29	**3**	15	7	2	26	1^{2}	8	**2***^{12}	4035	10^{4}
2	42	Chip Ganassi	29*^{1}	4	1*^{2}	5	29	7	13	13	7	14	31	7	13	15	**1***^{2}	1*^{12}	7^{2}	4	5	27	22	1*^{12}	6	**25***^{12}	25^{1}	1*^{12}	2	2	9	1^{2}	4	**9**	3	4034	46^{3}
3	21	Richard Childress	26	11	6	6	5	3	3	29^{1}	**23***^{1}	3	7	3	2	3	5	8	2	11	11	16	3	24	3^{2}	11	5^{2}	29	3^{1}	10^{1}	**7**^{2}	**2***^{1}	10^{1}	2	4	4033	10^{8}
4	20	Joe Gibbs	39	**3**	**2**^{1}	4	**21**	2	29^{1}	1*	12	4	3	36	11	2	12	3	1	1*^{1}	1^{2}	9	11	2	23	34	9	4	**1**	5^{2}	1*^{1}	37	**32**	1*	11	4026	42^{5}
NASCAR Xfinity Series Playoffs cut-off
5	9	Rick Hendrick	1	19	8	10	7	23	7	11	8	5	23	9	7	8	33^{1}	31	6	25	22	11	31	9	34	3	2	28	7	9	14	5	2*	6	1	2281	6
6	22	Roger Penske	34	2	4	1	1*^{12}	**1***^{1}	12	5	30	9	**1**	8^{2}	5	**11**	8	4*	9	**2**^{2}	18	**1***^{1}	**2***^{2}	5	37	1	3	9	13	**3**	8	39	3	4	5	2274	52^{1}
7	1	Dale Earnhardt Jr.	2	5	5	9	3	8	4	3^{2}	5^{1}	2^{1}	5	6	30^{2}	28	6	2	12	8	**6**	12	6	6	5	5	35	5	6	14	11	3	8	11	14	2248	8^{7}
8	7	Kelley Earnhardt Miller	31	6	3	**2***^{1}	2	35	2	14	3	1*^{2}	32	37	9	1*^{12}	7	9	4	7	2	3	1^{1}	3	1*	7	1*	2	32	15	3	38	5	24^{12}	7	2234	34^{2}
9	18	J. D. Gibbs	8	8	14	3^{2}	9	5	1^{2}	2	4	7	8*^{12}	1*^{1}	6*^{1}	6	4	39	3*^{1}	3	3	4	13	**36**	8	4	28	6	18	4	4	21	31	5	6	2227	16^{6}
10	19	Joe Gibbs	10	17	7	11	13	33^{2}	6*	10	2	**10**	15	24	18	5	11	12	36	6	12	7	23	29	9	12	10	7	8	22	6	36	6	7	8	2181	2^{10}
11	23	Maurice J. Gallagher Jr.	6	14	10	14	11	10	5	17	1	6	37	2	21	12	10	29	20	19	15	2^{2}	8	8	20	6	4	10	12	19	5	33	9	10	17	2178	8^{9}
12	3	Richard Childress	32	13	12	13	4	12	14	12	15	12	4	12	1	16	34	6	14	10	13	25	12	15	24	9	33	30	9	17	17	4	23	14	20	2175	5
13	2	Richard Childress	19	12	11	7	8	6	35	4	25	8	9	14	16	9	16	20	11	5	26	37	4	10	**2**^{1}	8	6	36	5	6	15	6	7	3	10	942	1
14	11	Matt Kaulig	7	9	15	15	12	11	10	7	38	11	6	10	10	14	15	13	13	13	8	18	5	22	25	15	22	8	11	16	10	11	33	13	15	868	–
15	16	Jack Roush	3	10	19	18	17	14	18	9	22	19	29	13	4	17	32	26	8	12	7	8	10	17	39	13	11	35	10	11	16	7	29	12	12	757	–
Pos.	No.	Car Owner	DAY	ATL	LVS	PHO	CAL	TEX	BRI	RCH	TAL	DOV	CLT	POC	MCH	IOW	CHI	DAY	KEN	NHA	IOW	GLN	MOH	BRI	ROA	DAR	IND	LVS	RCH	ROV	DOV	KAN	TEX	PHO	HOM	Points	Bonus

=== Manufacturers' Championship ===
Pos	Manufacturer	Wins	Points
1	Chevrolet	15	1214
2	Ford	9	1138
3	Toyota	9	1110
4	Dodge	0	85

== See also ==
- 2018 Monster Energy NASCAR Cup Series
- 2018 NASCAR Camping World Truck Series
- 2018 NASCAR K&N Pro Series East
- 2018 NASCAR K&N Pro Series West
- 2018 NASCAR Whelen Modified Tour
- 2018 NASCAR Pinty's Series
- 2018 NASCAR PEAK Mexico Series
- 2018 NASCAR Whelen Euro Series
