= JP Motorsports =

American autosports team

- Owners: Jerry Hattaway; Phyllis Hattaway
- Base: Escalon, California
- Series: NASCAR Xfinity Series
- Manufacturer: Toyota
- Opened: 2018
- Closed: 2019

Career
- Debut: 2018 PowerShares QQQ 300 (Daytona)
- Latest race: 2018 Ford EcoBoost 300 (Homestead)
- Races competed: 33
- Drivers' Championships: 0
- Race victories: 0
- Pole positions: 0

JP Motorsports was an American professional stock car racing team that competed in the NASCAR Xfinity Series, and was owned by Jerry and Phyllis Hattaway. The team planned to compete in 2019, but never announced any drivers for the year. JPM was formed in early 2018 from the assets of TriStar Motorsports' Xfinity Series program.

The Hattaways, before forming their own team, and previously has alliances with Derrike Cope Racing and MBM Motorsports.

== Xfinity Series ==
=== Team history ===
The team first became involved in NASCAR when they became partners in Derrike Cope Racing at the beginning of 2016. The partnership dissolved by the end of the season with Cope closing his team. The team then partnered with MBM Motorsports for Iowa's summer race in 2017 with Bobby Dale Earnhardt as the driver, though he failed to qualify.

The team's maiden independent voyage was for a full season in 2018; although the team made it through the year it was not without its low spots. Team owner Jerry Hattaway was knocked out by ex-employee Mike Hayden in a Dover garage in spring; Hayden had just quit his job, unhappy about unpaid wages and a chaotic work environment. He also later commented that Hattaway threatened some employees and got in fights with other employees and at times had pending legal consequences because of them, although Hattaway denied the report. Along with unpaid wages, unpaid bills to parts and engine companies added up throughout the season, leading the team's original parts supplier to stop doing business with the team, and disagreements about payment ensued after TriStar Motorsports rented JPM a hauler for 2018. One of the team's drivers, Brandon Hightower, eventually sued the team after his departure, although that case was later dropped. In October, Hattaway admitted that the team struggled, having little funding, 12 employees and very little in terms of planning. After the 2018 season, both of the team's drivers at the end of the year departed. Josh Bilicki went to RSS Racing and Bayley Currey went to Rick Ware Racing.

=== Car No. 45 history ===
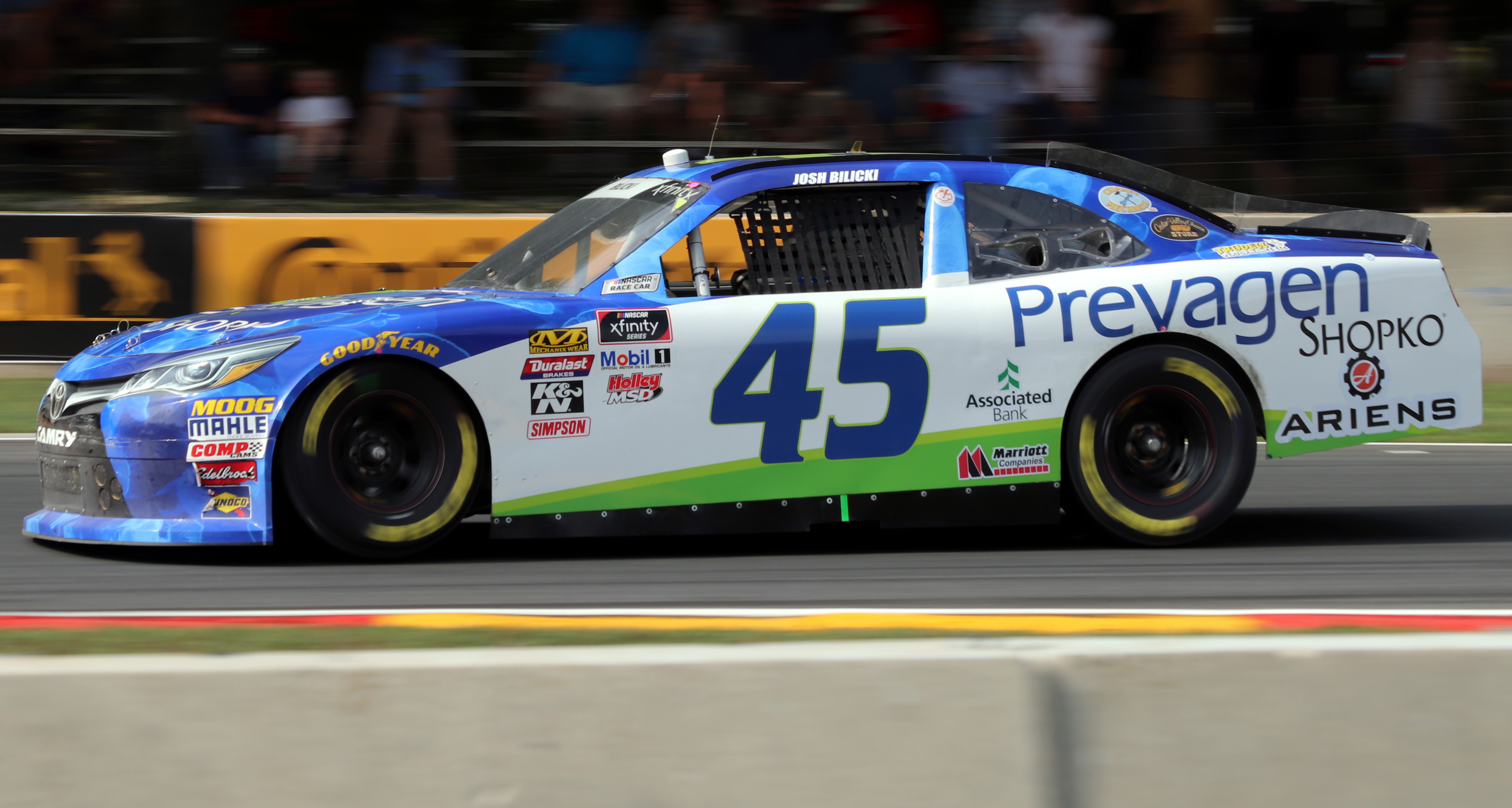
The #45 in 2018

On February 5, 2018, it was announced that Josh Bilicki would drive a second full time car, the No. 45, for JP with sponsorship coming from previous Bilicki partner Prevagen. The deal with Bilicki came after the team acquired an old Joe Gibbs Racing car to complement its original stable of TriStar Motorsports cars. The team failed to qualify for the Daytona and the Atlanta, but made nearly every race for the rest of the year, save for the season finale at Homestead. Bayley Currey replaced Bilicki in the No. 45 entry at Texas, moving over from the 55.

==== Car No. 45 Results ====
Year	Team	No.	Make	1	2	3	4	5	6	7	8	9	10	11	12	13	14	15	16	17	18	19	20	21	22	23	24	25	26	27	28	29	30	31	32	33	NXSC	Pts
2018	Josh Bilicki	45	Toyota	DAY; DNQ	ATL; DNQ	LVS; 28	PHO; 32	CAL; 32	TEX; 24	BRI; 32	RCH; 33	TAL; 28	DOV; 29	CLT; 25	POC; 29	MCH; 27	IOW; 36	CHI; 35	DAY; 40	KEN; 28	NHA; 34	IOW; 40	GLN; 32	MOH; 20	BRI; 35	ROA; 30	DAR; 28	IND; 38	LVS; 27	RCH; 30	CLT; 24	DOV; 31	KAN; 20		PHO; 34	HOM; DNQ	35th	245
2018	Bayley Currey	45	Toyota																															TEX; 21			35th	245

=== Car No. 55 history ===
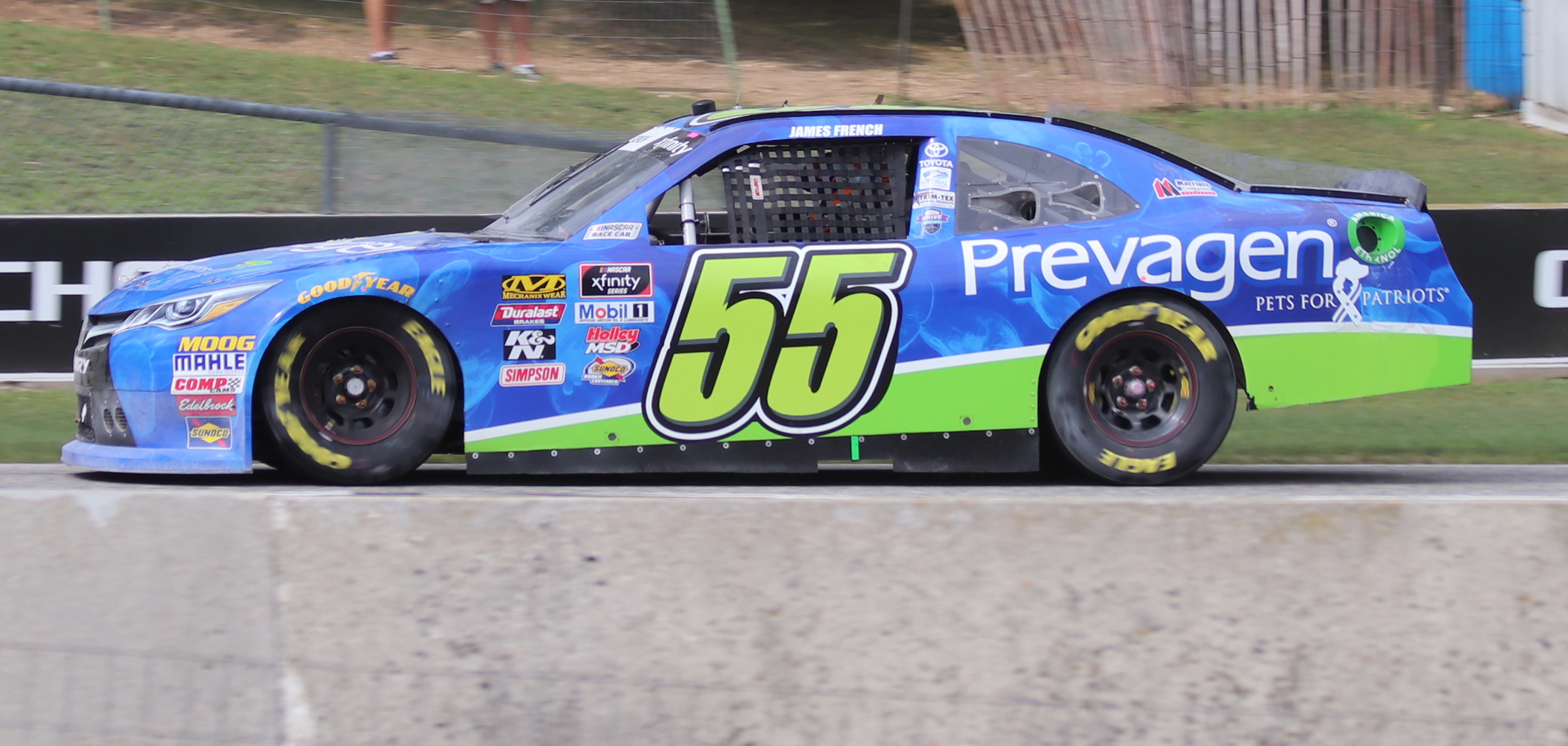
French in the #55 at Road America in 2018

In 2018, JP Motorsports announced that Stephen Leicht would drive the No. 55 car for the full 2018 season, with Jason Houghtaling as his crew chief. Jennifer Jo Cobb replaced Leicht in the No. 55 at Talladega. After Leicht returned to run at Dover, the team and driver parted ways. Brandon Hightower stepped in as driver starting at Charlotte. Hightower later left the team after Kentucky following a dispute about asset ownership; Bayley Currey stepped in as a last-minute replacement at Loudon. Sports car driver Dylan Murcott drove the car at Mid-Ohio but was relegated to last after a first-lap crash. Currey then became the team's oval driver, with Wisconsin native James French taking over the seat at Road America.

==== Car No. 55 results ====
Year	Driver	No.	Make	1	2	3	4	5	6	7	8	9	10	11	12	13	14	15	16	17	18	19	20	21	22	23	24	25	26	27	28	29	30	31	32	33	NXSC	Pts
2018	Stephen Leicht	55	Toyota	DAY; 15	ATL; 32	LVS; 30	PHO; 31	CAL; 31	TEX; 37	BRI; 28	RCH; 37		DOV; 33																								38th	171
2018	Jennifer Jo Cobb	55	Toyota									TAL; 29																									38th	171
2018	Brandon Hightower	55	Toyota											CLT; 27	POC; 32	MCH; 35	IOW; 30	CHI; 26	DAY; 30	KEN; 26																	38th	171
2018	Bayley Currey	55	Toyota																		NHA; 29				BRI; 27		DAR; 26	IND; 39	LVS; 24	RCH; 29	CLT; 35	DOV; 29	KAN; DNQ	TEX; Wth	PHO; 30	HOM; DNQ	38th	171
2018	Peter Shepherd III	55	Toyota																			IOW; 31															38th	171
2018	David Levine	55	Toyota																				GLN; Wth														38th	171
2018	Dylan Murcott	55	Toyota																					MOH; 40													38th	171
2018	James French	55	Toyota																							ROA; 38											38th	171
