= Dylan Murcott =

American racing driver (born 1992)

- Born: August 6, 1992 (age 34); Ancram, New York, U.S.
- Achievements: 2017 Continental Tire SportsCar Challenge GS champion

NASCAR O'Reilly Auto Parts Series career
- 2 races run over 1 year
- 2018 position: 74th
- First race: 2018 Rock N Roll Tequila 170 (Mid-Ohio)
- Last race: 2018 Drive for the Cure 200 (Charlotte)
Wins	Top tens	Poles
0	0	0

Dylan Murcott (born August 6, 1992) is an American sports car racing driver who currently races in the Michelin Pilot Challenge. He also competed in stock car racing as a road course ringer in the NASCAR Xfinity Series; in 2018, he drove the No. 8 Chevrolet for B. J. McLeod Motorsports.

== Racing career ==
=== Continental Tire SportsCar Challenge ===
In 2017, Murcott and Dillon Machavern drove the No. 28 Porsche Cayman GT4 MR for Team RS1, and became the champions of the season's GS class despite only winning one race.

=== NASCAR Xfinity Series ===
Murcott debuted in the Xfinity Series in 2018. He drove the No. 55 Toyota for JP Motorsports at Mid-Ohio. He started 34th, but crashed out of the race early on due to a brake failure and finished last.

Murcott then drove the No. 8 Chevrolet for B. J. McLeod Motorsports at Charlotte. He started 33rd and finished 30th.

== Motorsports career results ==
=== NASCAR ===
(key) (Bold – Pole position awarded by qualifying time. Italics – Pole position earned by points standings or practice time. * – Most laps led.)

==== Xfinity Series ====
NASCAR Xfinity Series results
Year	Team	No.	Make	1	2	3	4	5	6	7	8	9	10	11	12	13	14	15	16	17	18	19	20	21	22	23	24	25	26	27	28	29	30	31	32	33	NXSC	Pts	Ref
2018	JP Motorsports	55	Toyota	DAY	ATL	LVS	PHO	CAL	TEX	BRI	RCH	TAL	DOV	CLT	POC	MCH	IOW	CHI	DAY	KEN	NHA	IOW	GLN	MOH; 40	BRI	ROA	DAR	IND	LVS	RCH							74th	8	
2018	B. J. McLeod Motorsports	8	Chevy																												CLT; 30	DOV	KAN	TEX	PHO	HOM	74th	8	
