= Tony Eury Jr. =

NASCAR crew chief

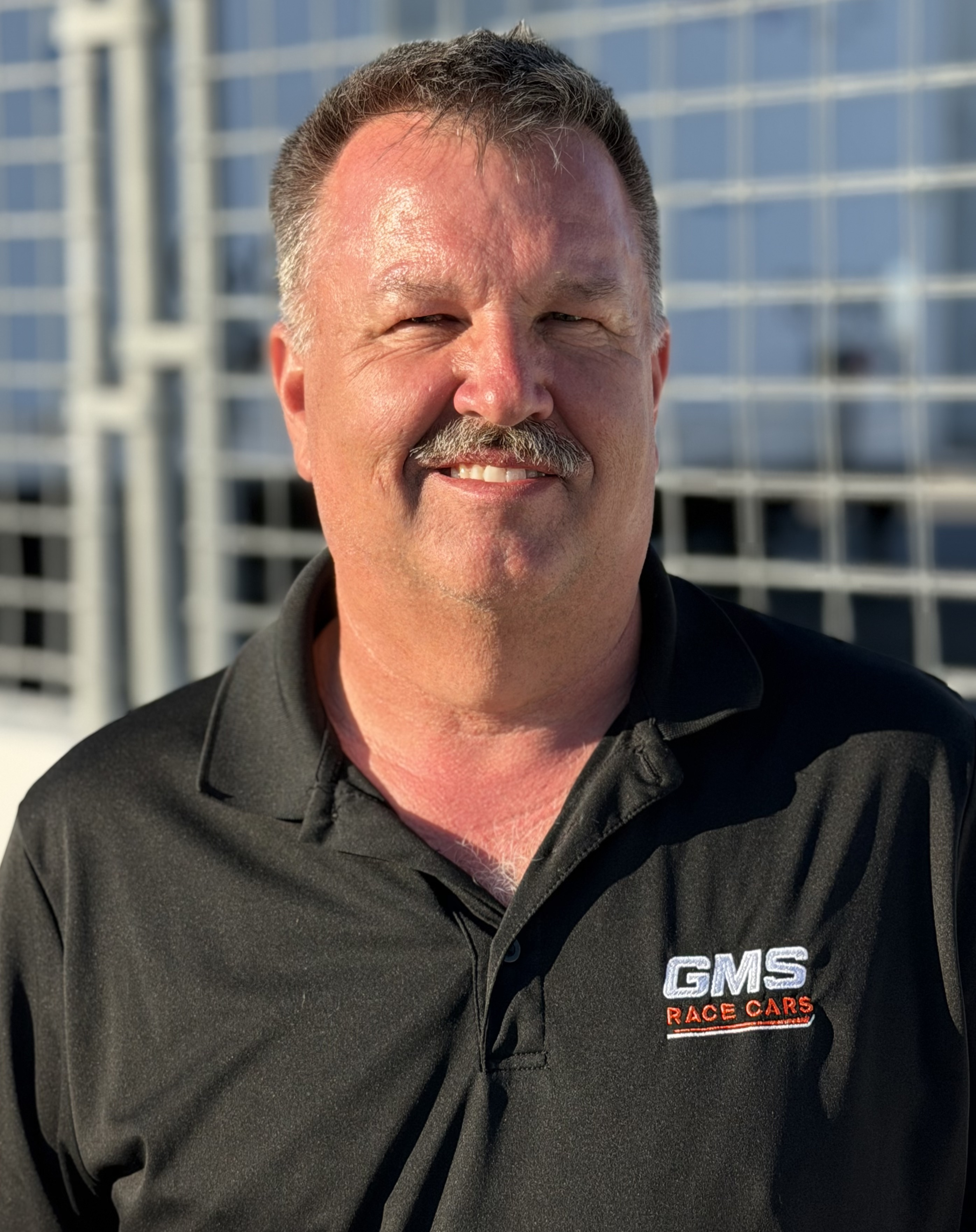
- Eury Jr. in 2026

Personal information
- Born: Anthony Eury Jr. January 3, 1973 (age 53) Kannapolis, North Carolina, U.S.

Sport
- Country: United States
- Sport: NASCAR Cup Series
- Team: 50. Team AmeriVet

Anthony Eury Jr. (born January 3, 1973) is an American professional stock car racing crew chief who works for Team AmeriVet as the crew chief of their No. 50 Chevrolet ZL1 in the NASCAR Cup Series driven by Burt Myers. He is also the co-owner of Fury Race Cars, a prominent chassis builder in late model racing.

== Early life ==
Eury was born into a racing family in Kannapolis, North Carolina. His family lived near the Earnhardts north of Charlotte and the heads of both families, Ralph Earnhardt and Ralph Eury, were close friends. Tony Eury Jr. is the son of Tony Eury Sr. and Sandra Gee, daughter of famed engine builder Robert Gee. Dale Earnhardt married Sandra's sister Brenda, mother of Dale Earnhardt Jr. Despite both marriages ending in divorce, the cousins grew up together.

== Racing career ==
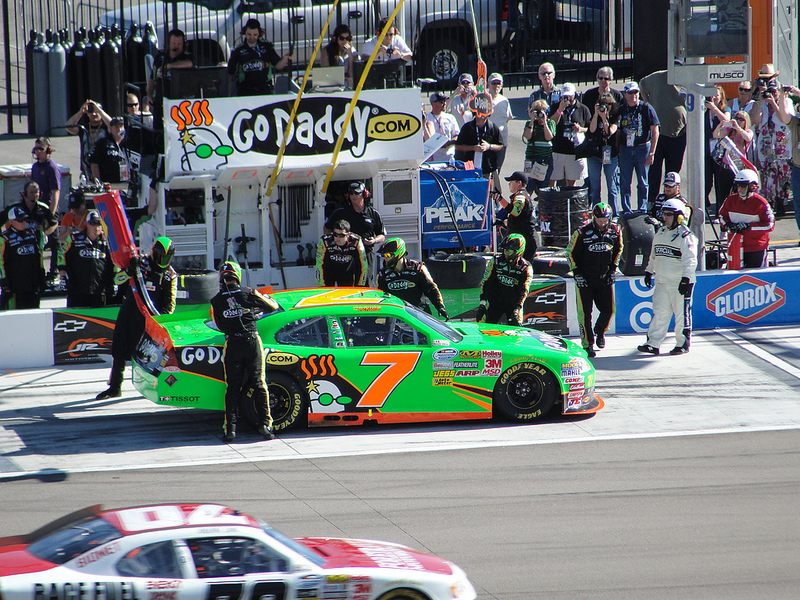
Eury Jr. (above the GoDaddy guy) during a pit stop in 2012

Eury worked with Dale Earnhardt, Inc., from 1991 to 2007. In 1993, he became the car chief (and one of the tire changers) for Dale Earnhardt's NASCAR Busch Series team, working under his father, crew chief Tony Eury Sr. In the 2004, 2006, and 2008 seasons, Eury helped Dale Earnhardt Jr. get into the Chase for the NASCAR Sprint Cup and challenge for the NASCAR Sprint Cup Championship. The 2004 season began with a win at the Daytona 500, the first of 6 wins that season.

In 2008, he began his crew chief career with Hendrick Motorsports, as Dale Earnhardt Jr. began racing for Rick Hendrick. After a poor showing in the 2009 Coca-Cola 600, some began to talk of Eury's possible firing and that he would be replaced by Ron Malec, who was the car chief for Hendrick teammate Jimmie Johnson's No. 48 car. On May 28, 2009, Hendrick Motorsports announced that Eury Jr. would be demoted to crew chief the team's part-time R&D car, the No. 25, driven by Brad Keselowski, replacing Lance McGrew, who switched jobs with Eury Jr. and became Earnhardt Jr.'s crew chief. In 2010, Eury Jr. became a crew chief for Earnhardt Jr.'s JR Motorsports team in the Nationwide Series, crew chiefing the team's No. 7 car, driven by IndyCar driver Danica Patrick as well as other drivers that year and in 2011. In 2012, Patrick left IndyCar to drive the car full-time with Eury Jr. as her crew chief for most of the season until he was released from the team before the race at Kentucky in September. Eury Jr. was replaced by Ryan Pemberton, who was hired to be the team's new competition director, replacing his father Tony Eury Sr. who was also released from JRM, as well as the interim crew chief for Patrick's No. 7 car. On December 10, 2012, Eury Jr. was hired by Swan Racing (previously Inception Motorsports) as the crew chief for David Stremme's No. 30 car in the Sprint Cup Series, replacing Steven Lane.

In 2018, Eury Jr. was hired by Premium Motorsports to serve as the crew chief for their No. 7 car in the Daytona 500 when it was driven by Danica Patrick in her final NASCAR race. He only crew chiefed the car in that race in order to reunite with Patrick, as he was her crew chief at JR Motorsports from 2010 to 2012 in what was then known as the Nationwide Series.

In 2020, Eury Jr. was the crew chief for Natalie Decker and the Ken Schrader Racing No. 52 car in the ARCA Menards Series season-opener at Daytona, fielded in a collaboration with Fury Race Cars.

In 2022, Eury Jr. returned to NASCAR again and became the crew chief for the new Money Team's No. 50 car driven by Kaz Grala, the son of Darius Grala, one of the other co-owners of Fury Race Cars. On February 23, 2022, Eury was suspended for four races after the No. 50 lost a wheel during the 2022 Daytona 500.

On January 17, 2025, it was announced that Eury Jr. would return as crew chief of the No. 50 car for the renamed Team AmeriVet in 2025 with Burt Myers making his Cup Series debut in the season-opening Cook Out Clash.
