= Fury Race Cars =

Stock car racing team

FURY Race Cars
- Type: Private
- Industry: Automotive
- Founded: August 1, 2016; 10 years ago in Mooresville, North Carolina, U.S.
- Founders: Darius Grala; Tony Eury Jr.; Jeff Fultz
- Headquarters: Mooresville, North Carolina, U.S.
- Products: Racing chassis
- Owners: Darius Grala; Jeff Fultz
- Base: Mooresville, North Carolina
- Series: NASCAR Xfinity Series; ARCA Menards Series; Super Late Model; Pro Late Model; Tour Type Modified; SK Modified
- Manufacturer: Ford; Chevrolet
Career
- Debut: Xfinity Series: 2018 Alsco 300 (Charlotte); ARCA Menards Series: 2020 Lucas Oil 200 (Daytona)
- Latest race: Xfinity Series: 2018 Ford EcoBoost 300 (Homestead-Miami)
- Races competed: 12
- Drivers' Championships: 0
- Race victories: 0
- Pole positions: 0
- Website: www.furyracecars.com

Fury Race Cars, officially styled as FURY Race Cars, is an American race car manufacturer and professional Late Model and stock car racing team. The company was founded in 2016 by Darius Grala, Tony Eury Jr. and Jeff Fultz, all championship-winning veterans in various forms of motorsports. The team manufactures race cars and chassis for NASCAR, the ARCA Menards Series, and other late model and modified racing series around the United States, The team formerly fielded a part-time NASCAR Xfinity Series team in 2018, the No. 61 Ford Mustang for Kaz Grala.

== Manufacturing business and late model team ==
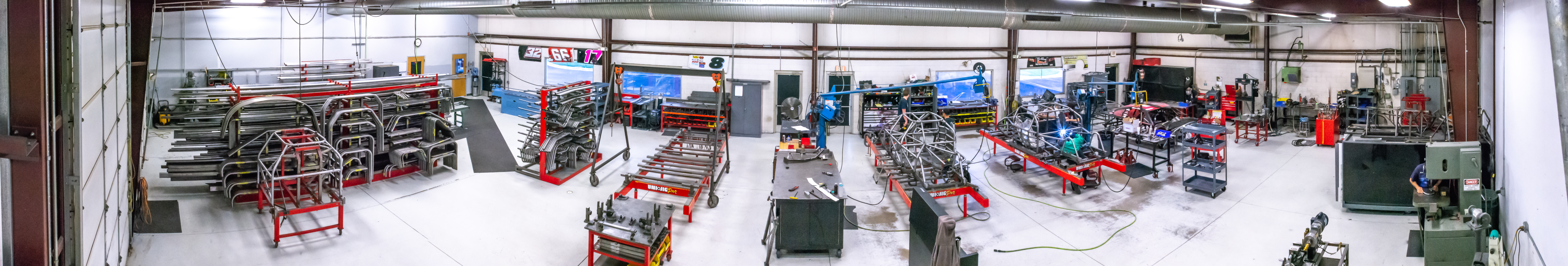
The main floor of the FURY Race Cars shop in Mooresville, NC.

Formed in 2016, Fury Race Cars manufactures Pro and Super Late Models (called the Model L) and Modified race cars (Model M), as well as track-day road-course cars (Model R). The company sells race cars to customers across North America and Europe at any requested level of completion, from bare chassis to turn-key ready-to-race vehicles. All race cars are built at the Fury shop in Mooresville, North Carolina. Fury also has several authorized dealers and repair facilities across the United States and Canada where customers can purchase new Fury cars, purchase parts or repair damaged race cars.

Fury Race Cars' first big win as a company came in December of 2016 when Christian Eckes won the Snowball Derby at Five Flags Speedway. Fury cars have also captured the 2016–2018 NASCAR Whelen Modified Tour championships, as well as regional and track championships across the U.S. The company's vehicles have also finished first, second and third in both the 2018 Rattler 250 and 2018 World Series of Asphalt Stock Car Racing and earned a 1–2–3–4–5 sweep in the 2018 Winchester 400.

In October 2020, Fury became the chassis designer and builder for the newly-formed Superstar Racing Experience series.

== NASCAR and ARCA ==
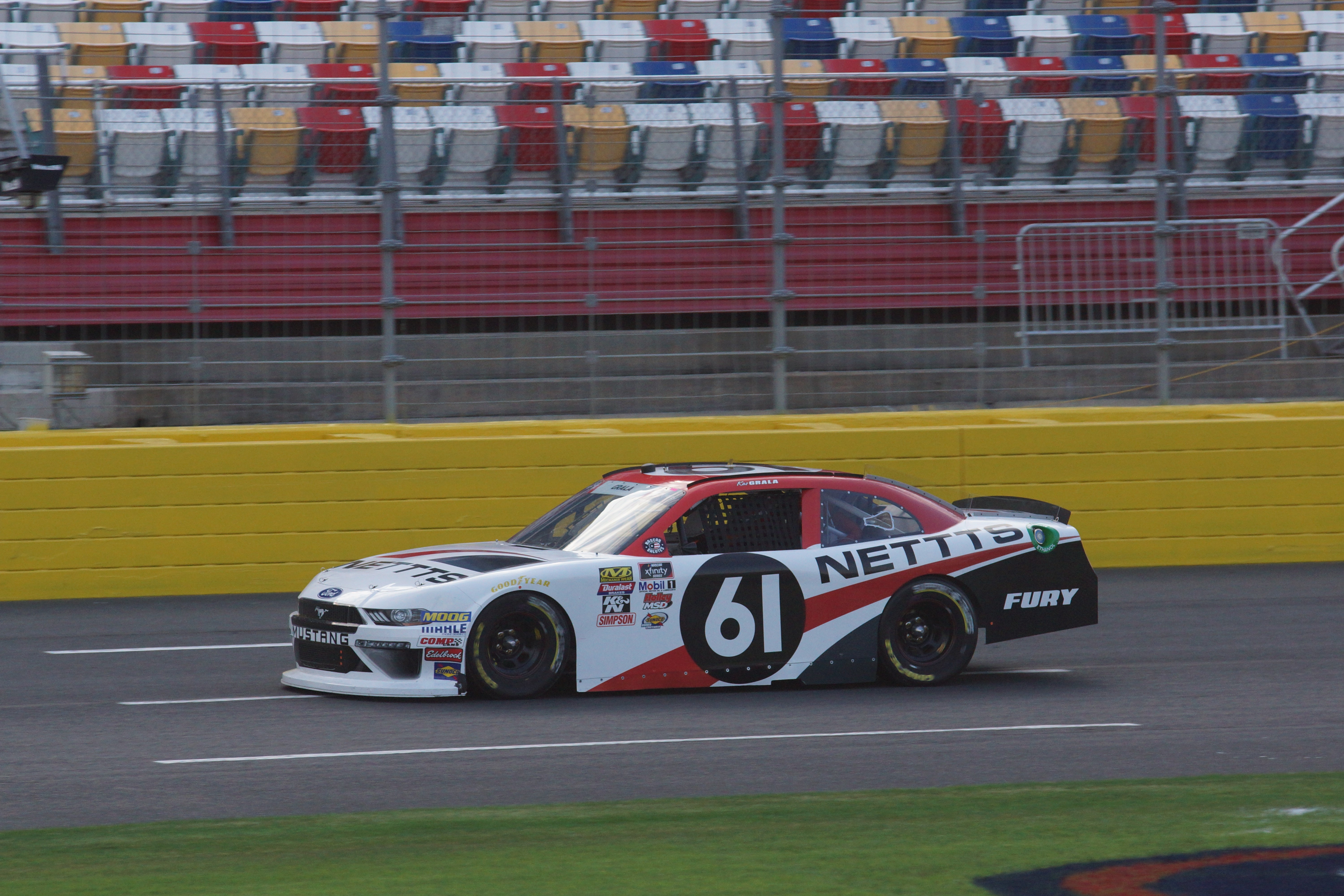
Fury 's No. 61 Ford at Charlotte, their debut in the NASCAR Xfinity Series.

The team's driver, Kaz Grala, had been running full-time in the Xfinity Series for JGL Racing, a team that was struggling in two ways that year, with finding sponsorship and their owner James Whitener having health problems. Grala was released by JGL on May 15, 2018 with his No. 24 team shutting down, and JGL cut back to one car. Three days later, it was announced that Grala would be driving in the next four races with FURY, which is owned in part by his father Darius. Sponsorship came from New England Tractor Trailer Training School, which had supported Grala throughout his racing career, including in the Xfinity Series at JGL. JGL also provided Kaz Grala with three cars when it terminated his contract, and many crew members from JGL, including crew chief Shane Wilson, moved over to FURY's team, which would use the No. 61, which was chosen in honor of Richie Evans. In the team's debut at Charlotte Motor Speedway, they finished an impressive 10th. Two weeks later at Michigan International Speedway, Grala led his first ever laps for the team and finished 12th, Grala would then go onto finish 10th at Iowa Speedway in what many thought could be his last race of the season, but two weeks later it was announced that IT Coalition and longtime sponsor Kiklos would hop on board for the next race at Chicagoland Speedway. In just the team's sixth race at Daytona International Speedway, Grala would finish fifth in a borrowed 10-year-old race car, which had been retired as a show car, earning the team's first top-five finish in their brief history. Grala and the team couldn’t find a sponsor to run at Kentucky, which meant he and the team were no longer eligible for the playoffs. With additional support from IT Coalition, DMB Financial and Hot Scream, Grala was able to run the four road-course races on the Xfinity Series schedule, his home-track event at New Hampshire Motor Speedway and the 2018 season finale at Homestead–Miami Speedway.

Grala left Fury for Richard Childress Racing in 2019, and the team ended up not running any Xfinity races that year with another driver. After their one year away from stock car racing, the team returned in 2020, fielding a car in the ARCA Menards Series for the first time. Their entry was fielded in a collaboration with Ken Schrader Racing at Daytona, with one of their late model drivers, Natalie Decker (who also runs part-time in the Truck Series for Niece Motorsports), behind the wheel of Schrader's No. 52 at Daytona.

=== Car No. 61 results ===
NASCAR Xfinity Series results
Year	Driver	No.	Make	1	2	3	4	5	6	7	8	9	10	11	12	13	14	15	16	17	18	19	20	21	22	23	24	25	26	27	28	29	30	31	32	33	NXSC	Pts
2018	Kaz Grala	61	Ford	DAY	ATL	LVS	PHO	CAL	TEX	BRI	RCH	TAL	DOV	CLT; 10	POC; 16	MCH; 12	IOW; 10	CHI; 40	DAY; 5	KEN	NHA; 14	IOW	GLN; 15	MOH; 27	BRI	ROA; 11	DAR	IND	LVS	RCH	ROV; 8	DOV	KAN	TEX	PHO	HOM; 18	33rd	283
