= 2018 Drive for the Cure 200 =

28th race of the 2018 NASCAR Xfinity Series

2018 Drive for the Cure 200 presented by Blue Cross Blue Shield of North Carolina
Race details
- Race 28 of 33 of the 2018 NASCAR Xfinity Series
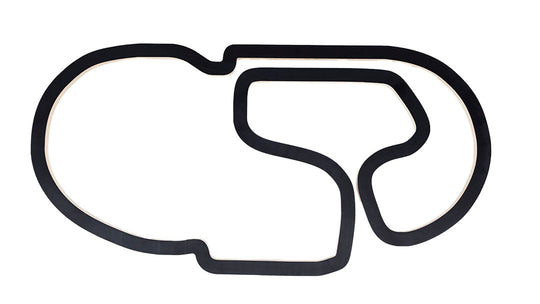
- Date: September 29, 2018
- Official name: 37th Annual Drive for the Cure 200 presented by Blue Cross Blue Shield of North Carolina
- Location: Concord, North Carolina, Charlotte Motor Speedway
- Course: Permanent racing facility
- Course length: 2.28 miles (3.67 km)
- Distance: 55 laps, 125.4 mi (201.812 km)
- Scheduled distance: 55 laps, 125.4 mi (201.812 km)
- Average speed: 81.267 miles per hour (130.787 km/h)

Pole position
Driver	Austin Cindric	Team Penske
- Time: 1:17.781

Most laps led
Driver	Chase Briscoe	Stewart-Haas Racing with Biagi-DenBeste
- Laps: 33

Winner
No. 98	Chase Briscoe	Stewart-Haas Racing with Biagi-DenBeste

Television in the United States
- Network: NBCSN
- Announcers: Rick Allen, Jeff Burton, Steve Letarte, Dale Earnhardt Jr.

Radio in the United States
- Radio: Performance Racing Network

The 2018 Drive for the Cure 200 presented by Blue Cross Blue Shield of North Carolina was the 28th stock car race of the 2018 NASCAR Xfinity Series season, the second race in the Round of 12, and the 37th iteration of the event. The race was held on Saturday, September 29, 2018, in Concord, North Carolina at the Charlotte Motor Speedway roval, a permanent 2.28 miles (3.67 km) road course, using part of the oval and part of the infield road course. The race took the scheduled 55 laps to complete. At race's end, Chase Briscoe of Stewart-Haas Racing with Biagi-DenBeste would dominate the late stages of the race to win his first ever career NASCAR Xfinity Series win and his first and only win of the season. To fill out the podium, Justin Marks of Chip Ganassi Racing and Austin Cindric of Team Penske would finish second and third, respectively.

== Background ==
The layout of Charlotte Motor Speedway, the venue where the race was held.

For 2018, deviating from past NASCAR events at Charlotte, the race would utilize a road course configuration of Charlotte Motor Speedway, promoted and trademarked as the "Roval". The course is 2.28 miles (3.67 km) in length and features 17 turns, utilizing the infield road course and portions of the oval track. The race would be contested over a scheduled distance of 55 laps, 201.812 kilometres (125.400 mi).

During July 2018 tests on the road course, concerns were raised over drivers "cheating" designated chicanes on the course. The chicanes were modified with additional tire barriers and rumble strips in order to encourage drivers to properly drive through them, and NASCAR will enforce drive-through penalties on drivers who illegally "short-cut" parts of the course. The chicanes will not be used during pace laps, nor will they be used during restarts.

=== Entry list ===
#	Driver	Team	Make	Sponsor
0	Garrett Smithley	JD Motorsports	Chevrolet	JD Motorsports
00	Cole Custer	Stewart-Haas Racing with Biagi-DenBeste	Ford	Haas Automation
1	Elliott Sadler	JR Motorsports	Chevrolet	OneMain Financial "Lending Done Human"
01	Lawson Aschenbach	JD Motorsports	Chevrolet	JD Motorsports
2	Matt Tifft	Richard Childress Racing	Chevrolet	Nexteer
3	Brendan Gaughan	Richard Childress Racing	Chevrolet	South Point Hotel, Casino & Spa, Beard Oil Distributing
4	Ross Chastain	JD Motorsports	Chevrolet	Outdoor Republic, Florida Watermelon Association
5	Michael Annett	JR Motorsports	Chevrolet	TMC Transportation
7	Justin Allgaier	JR Motorsports	Chevrolet	Vannoy Construction
8	Dylan Murcott	B. J. McLeod Motorsports	Chevrolet	CorvetteParts.net, The Drying Center
9	Tyler Reddick	JR Motorsports	Chevrolet	BurgerFi
11	Ryan Truex	Kaulig Racing	Chevrolet	LeafFilter Gutter Protection
13	Landon Cassill	MBM Motorsports	Dodge	MBM Motorsports
15	Katherine Legge	JD Motorsports	Chevrolet	Airtec
16	Ryan Reed	Roush Fenway Racing	Ford	DriveDownA1C.com
18	Ryan Preece	Joe Gibbs Racing	Toyota	Rheem
19	Brandon Jones	Joe Gibbs Racing	Toyota	Juniper Networks
20	Christopher Bell	Joe Gibbs Racing	Toyota	GameStop, Fallout 76
21	Daniel Hemric	Richard Childress Racing	Chevrolet	South Point Hotel, Casino & Spa
22	Austin Cindric	Team Penske	Ford	MoneyLion
23	Spencer Gallagher	GMS Racing	Chevrolet	ISM Connect
35	Joey Gase	Go Green Racing with SS-Green Light Racing	Chevrolet	Sparks Energy, Agri Supply Company
36	Alex Labbé	DGM Racing	Chevrolet	La Rue Industrial Snowblowers
38	Jeff Green	RSS Racing	Chevrolet	'Til I'm Gone by Frank Foster
39	Ryan Sieg	RSS Racing	Chevrolet	Night Owl Contractors
40	Chad Finchum	MBM Motorsports	Toyota	CrashClaimsR.Us, Smithbilt Homes
42	Justin Marks	Chip Ganassi Racing	Chevrolet	Chevrolet Accessories
45	Josh Bilicki	JP Motorsports	Toyota	Prevagen
51	Jeremy Clements	Jeremy Clements Racing	Chevrolet	Travers Tool Company, RepairableVehicles.com
52	David Starr	Jimmy Means Racing	Chevrolet	Extreme Kleaner
55	Bayley Currey	JP Motorsports	Toyota	Touched by Pros, Rollin Smoke Barbecue
60	Ty Majeski	Roush Fenway Racing	Ford	Ford
61	Kaz Grala	Fury Race Cars	Ford	IT Coalition
66	Timmy Hill	MBM Motorsports	Dodge	Leith Cars
74	Ray Black Jr.	Mike Harmon Racing	Chevrolet	Isokern Fireplaces & Chimmeys
76	Spencer Boyd	SS-Green Light Racing	Chevrolet	Grunt Style "This We'll Defend"
78	Vinnie Miller	B. J. McLeod Motorsports	Chevrolet	JAS Expedited Trucking
90	Andy Lally	DGM Racing	Chevrolet	Alpha Prime Regimen
93	Jeff Green	RSS Racing	Chevrolet	RSS Racing
97	Tanner Berryhill	Obaika Racing	Chevrolet	Vroom! Brands, South Africa
98	Chase Briscoe	Stewart-Haas Racing with Biagi-DenBeste	Ford	Ford
Official entry list

== Practice ==
=== First practice ===
The first practice session would occur on Thursday, September 27, at 11:00 AM EST and would last for two hours. Austin Cindric of Team Penske would set the fastest time in the session, with a lap of 1:19.998 and an average speed of 102.603 miles per hour (165.124 km/h).

Pos.	#	Driver	Team	Make	Time	Speed
1	22	Austin Cindric	Team Penske	Ford	1:19.998	102.603
2	21	Daniel Hemric	Richard Childress Racing	Chevrolet	1:20.871	101.495
3	11	Ryan Truex	Kaulig Racing	Chevrolet	1:21.156	101.139
Full first practice results

=== Second practice ===
The second practice session would occur on Thursday, September 27, at 2:00 PM EST and would last for two hours. Cole Custer of Stewart-Haas Racing with Biagi-DenBeste would set the fastest time in the session, with a lap of 1:19.517 and an average speed of 103.223 miles per hour (166.121 km/h).

Pos.	#	Driver	Team	Make	Time	Speed
1	00	Cole Custer	Stewart-Haas Racing with Biagi-DenBeste	Ford	1:19.517	103.223
2	22	Austin Cindric	Team Penske	Ford	1:19.770	102.896
3	9	Tyler Reddick	JR Motorsports	Chevrolet	1:19.771	102.895
Full second practice results

=== Third practice ===
The third practice session would occur on Friday, September 28, at 1:05 PM EST and would last for 50 minutes. Austin Cindric of Team Penske would set the fastest time in the session, with a lap of 1:18.443 and an average speed of 104.636 miles per hour (168.395 km/h).

Pos.	#	Driver	Team	Make	Time	Speed
1	22	Austin Cindric	Team Penske	Ford	1:18.443	104.636
2	21	Daniel Hemric	Richard Childress Racing	Chevrolet	1:18.561	104.479
3	36	Alex Labbé	DGM Racing	Chevrolet	1:18.885	104.050
Official third practice results

=== Fourth and final practice ===
The fourth and final practice session, sometimes referred to as Happy Hour, would occur on Friday, September 28, at 3:05 PM EST and would last for 50 minutes. Daniel Hemric of Richard Childress Racing would set the fastest time in the session, with a lap of 1:18.197 and an average speed of 104.966 miles per hour (168.926 km/h).

Pos.	#	Driver	Team	Make	Time	Speed
1	21	Daniel Hemric	Richard Childress Racing	Chevrolet	1:18.197	104.966
2	11	Ryan Truex	Kaulig Racing	Chevrolet	1:19.184	103.657
3	00	Cole Custer	Stewart-Haas Racing with Biagi-DenBeste	Ford	1:19.458	103.300
Official Happy Hour practice results

== Qualifying ==
Qualifying would occur on Saturday, September 29, at 12:10 PM EST. Since the Charlotte Motor Speedway Roval is a road course, the qualifying system was a multi-car system that included two rounds. The first round was 25 minutes, where every driver would be able to set a lap within the 25 minutes. Then, the second round would consist of the fastest 12 cars in Round 1, and drivers would have 10 minutes to set a lap. Whoever set the fastest time in Round 2 would win the pole.

Austin Cindric of Team Penske would win the pole, setting a time of 1:17.781 and an average speed of 105.527 miles per hour (169.829 km/h) in the second round.

Tanner Berryhill of Obaika Racing would be the only driver to fail to qualify, not making a lap in the qualifying session.

=== Full qualifying results ===
Pos.	#	Driver	Team	Make	Time (R1)	Speed (R1)	Time (R2)	Speed (R2)
1	22	Austin Cindric	Team Penske	Ford	1:18.041	105.175	1:17.781	105.527
2	21	Daniel Hemric	Richard Childress Racing	Chevrolet	1:18.428	104.657	1:17.924	105.333
3	9	Tyler Reddick	JR Motorsports	Chevrolet	1:18.532	104.518	1:18.403	104.690
4	42	Justin Marks	Chip Ganassi Racing	Chevrolet	1:18.760	104.215	1:18.629	104.389
5	36	Alex Labbé	DGM Racing	Chevrolet	1:18.100	105.096	1:18.703	104.291
6	00	Cole Custer	Stewart-Haas Racing with Biagi-DenBeste	Ford	1:18.716	104.274	1:18.709	104.283
7	2	Matt Tifft	Richard Childress Racing	Chevrolet	1:18.923	104.000	1:18.773	104.198
8	60	Ty Majeski	Roush-Fenway Racing	Ford	1:18.501	104.559	1:18.785	104.182
9	98	Chase Briscoe	Stewart-Haas Racing with Biagi-DenBeste	Ford	1:18.699	104.296	1:18.824	104.131
10	18	Ryan Preece	Joe Gibbs Racing	Toyota	1:18.714	104.276	1:19.045	103.840
11	11	Ryan Truex	Kaulig Racing	Chevrolet	1:18.812	104.147	1:19.210	103.623
12	7	Justin Allgaier	JR Motorsports	Chevrolet	1:19.069	103.808	1:19.361	103.426
Eliminated in Round 1
13	20	Christopher Bell	Joe Gibbs Racing	Toyota	1:19.091	103.779	—	—
14	61	Kaz Grala	Fury Race Cars	Ford	1:19.096	103.773	—	—
15	16	Ryan Reed	Roush-Fenway Racing	Ford	1:19.284	103.527	—	—
16	4	Ross Chastain	JD Motorsports	Chevrolet	1:19.333	103.463	—	—
17	1	Elliott Sadler	JR Motorsports	Chevrolet	1:19.354	103.435	—	—
18	3	Brendan Gaughan	Richard Childress Racing	Chevrolet	1:19.680	103.012	—	—
19	51	Jeremy Clements	Jeremy Clements Racing	Chevrolet	1:19.930	102.690	—	—
20	90	Andy Lally	DGM Racing	Chevrolet	1:20.235	102.299	—	—
21	01	Lawson Aschenbach	JD Motorsports	Chevrolet	1:20.406	102.082	—	—
22	19	Brandon Jones	Joe Gibbs Racing	Toyota	1:20.588	101.851	—	—
23	5	Michael Annett	JR Motorsports	Chevrolet	1:20.625	101.805	—	—
24	66	Timmy Hill	MBM Motorsports	Toyota	1:20.643	101.782	—	—
25	23	Spencer Gallagher	GMS Racing	Chevrolet	1:20.896	101.464	—	—
26	15	Katherine Legge	JD Motorsports	Chevrolet	1:20.994	101.341	—	—
27	39	Ryan Sieg	RSS Racing	Chevrolet	1:21.406	100.828	—	—
28	45	Josh Bilicki	JP Motorsports	Toyota	1:21.577	100.617	—	—
29	35	Joey Gase	Go Green Racing with SS-Green Light Racing	Chevrolet	1:21.646	100.532	—	—
30	74	Ray Black Jr.	Mike Harmon Racing	Chevrolet	1:21.722	100.438	—	—
31	13	Landon Cassill	MBM Motorsports	Dodge	1:21.813	100.326	—	—
32	55	Bayley Currey	JP Motorsports	Toyota	1:23.107	98.764	—	—
33	8	Dylan Murcott	B. J. McLeod Motorsports	Chevrolet	1:23.460	98.347	—	—
Qualified by owner's points
34	52	David Starr	Jimmy Means Racing	Chevrolet	1:24.562	97.065	—	—
35	76	Spencer Boyd	SS-Green Light Racing	Chevrolet	1:25.019	96.543	—	—
36	0	Garrett Smithley	JD Motorsports	Chevrolet	1:25.246	96.286	—	—
37	40	Chad Finchum	MBM Motorsports	Dodge	1:25.953	95.494	—	—
38	38	J. J. Yeley	RSS Racing	Chevrolet	1:27.072	94.267	—	—
39	93	Jeff Green	RSS Racing	Chevrolet	1:27.108	94.228	—	—
40	78	Vinnie Miller	B. J. McLeod Motorsports	Chevrolet	1:28.022	93.249	—	—
Failed to qualify
41	97	Tanner Berryhill	Obaika Racing	Chevrolet	—	—	—	—
Official qualifying results
Official starting lineup

== Race results ==
Stage 1 Laps: 15

Pos.	#	Driver	Team	Make	Pts
1	21	Daniel Hemric	Richard Childress Racing	Chevrolet	10
2	00	Cole Custer	Stewart-Haas Racing with Biagi-DenBeste	Ford	9
3	9	Tyler Reddick	JR Motorsports	Chevrolet	8
4	22	Austin Cindric	Team Penske	Ford	7
5	42	Justin Marks	Chip Ganassi Racing	Chevrolet	6
6	18	Ryan Preece	Joe Gibbs Racing	Toyota	5
7	2	Matt Tifft	Richard Childress Racing	Chevrolet	4
8	3	Brendan Gaughan	Richard Childress Racing	Chevrolet	3
9	7	Justin Allgaier	JR Motorsports	Chevrolet	2
10	61	Kaz Grala	Fury Race Cars	Ford	1

Stage 2 Laps: 15

Pos.	#	Driver	Team	Make	Pts
1	20	Christopher Bell	Joe Gibbs Racing	Toyota	10
2	00	Cole Custer	Stewart-Haas Racing with Biagi-DenBeste	Ford	9
3	9	Tyler Reddick	JR Motorsports	Chevrolet	8
4	18	Ryan Preece	Joe Gibbs Racing	Toyota	7
5	1	Elliott Sadler	JR Motorsports	Chevrolet	6
6	90	Andy Lally	DGM Racing	Chevrolet	5
7	61	Kaz Grala	Fury Race Cars	Ford	4
8	23	Spencer Gallagher	GMS Racing	Chevrolet	3
9	98	Chase Briscoe	Stewart-Haas Racing with Biagi-DenBeste	Ford	2
10	01	Lawson Aschenbach	JD Motorsports	Chevrolet	1

Stage 3 Laps: 20

Fin	St	#	Driver	Team	Make	Laps	Led	Status	Pts
1	9	98	Chase Briscoe	Stewart-Haas Racing with Biagi-DenBeste	Ford	55	33	running	42
2	4	42	Justin Marks	Chip Ganassi Racing	Chevrolet	55	0	running	41
3	1	22	Austin Cindric	Team Penske	Ford	55	13	running	41
4	10	18	Ryan Preece	Joe Gibbs Racing	Toyota	55	0	running	45
5	13	20	Christopher Bell	Joe Gibbs Racing	Toyota	55	5	running	42
6	7	2	Matt Tifft	Richard Childress Racing	Chevrolet	55	0	running	35
7	6	00	Cole Custer	Stewart-Haas Racing with Biagi-DenBeste	Ford	55	0	running	48
8	14	61	Kaz Grala	Fury Race Cars	Ford	55	0	running	34
9	3	9	Tyler Reddick	JR Motorsports	Chevrolet	55	0	running	44
10	2	21	Daniel Hemric	Richard Childress Racing	Chevrolet	55	4	running	37
11	15	16	Ryan Reed	Roush-Fenway Racing	Ford	55	0	running	26
12	16	4	Ross Chastain	JD Motorsports	Chevrolet	55	0	running	25
13	5	36	Alex Labbé	DGM Racing	Chevrolet	55	0	running	24
14	17	1	Elliott Sadler	JR Motorsports	Chevrolet	55	0	running	29
15	12	7	Justin Allgaier	JR Motorsports	Chevrolet	55	0	running	24
16	11	11	Ryan Truex	Kaulig Racing	Chevrolet	55	0	running	21
17	18	3	Brendan Gaughan	Richard Childress Racing	Chevrolet	55	0	running	23
18	19	51	Jeremy Clements	Jeremy Clements Racing	Chevrolet	55	0	running	19
19	25	23	Spencer Gallagher	GMS Racing	Chevrolet	55	0	running	21
20	23	5	Michael Annett	JR Motorsports	Chevrolet	55	0	running	17
21	21	01	Lawson Aschenbach	JD Motorsports	Chevrolet	55	0	running	17
22	22	19	Brandon Jones	Joe Gibbs Racing	Toyota	55	0	running	15
23	29	35	Joey Gase	Go Green Racing with SS-Green Light Racing	Chevrolet	55	0	running	14
24	28	45	Josh Bilicki	JP Motorsports	Toyota	55	0	running	13
25	36	0	Garrett Smithley	JD Motorsports	Chevrolet	55	0	running	12
26	30	74	Ray Black Jr.	Mike Harmon Racing	Chevrolet	55	0	running	11
27	34	52	David Starr	Jimmy Means Racing	Chevrolet	55	0	running	10
28	37	40	Chad Finchum	MBM Motorsports	Dodge	55	0	running	9
29	35	76	Spencer Boyd	SS-Green Light Racing	Chevrolet	55	0	running	8
30	33	8	Dylan Murcott	B. J. McLeod Motorsports	Chevrolet	55	0	running	7
31	40	78	Vinnie Miller	B. J. McLeod Motorsports	Chevrolet	52	0	running	6
32	24	66	Timmy Hill	MBM Motorsports	Toyota	50	0	running	5
33	26	15	Katherine Legge	JD Motorsports	Chevrolet	50	0	running	4
34	8	60	Ty Majeski	Roush-Fenway Racing	Ford	49	0	running	3
35	32	55	Bayley Currey	JP Motorsports	Toyota	37	0	engine	0
36	27	39	Ryan Sieg	RSS Racing	Chevrolet	37	0	suspension	1
37	20	90	Andy Lally	DGM Racing	Chevrolet	34	0	crash	6
38	31	13	Landon Cassill	MBM Motorsports	Dodge	30	0	engine	1
39	39	93	Jeff Green	RSS Racing	Chevrolet	20	0	brakes	1
40	38	38	J. J. Yeley	RSS Racing	Chevrolet	6	0	suspension	1
Failed to qualify
41		97	Tanner Berryhill	Obaika Racing	Chevrolet				
Official race results

Previous race: 2018 Go Bowling 250	NASCAR Xfinity Series; 2018 season	Next race: 2018 Bar Harbor 200
