= 2018 Iowa 250 =

14th race of the 2018 NASCAR Xfinity Series

2018 Iowa 250 presented by Enogen
Race details
- Race 14 of 33 in the 2018 NASCAR Xfinity Series
- Date: June 17, 2018
- Official name: 8th Annual Iowa 250 presented by Enogen
- Location: Newton, Iowa, Iowa Speedway
- Course: Permanent racing facility
- Course length: 0.875 miles (1.408 km)
- Distance: 250 laps, 218.75 mi (352.044 km)
- Scheduled distance: 250 laps, 218.75 mi (352.044 km)
- Average speed: 102.1 miles per hour (164.3 km/h)

Pole position
Driver	Austin Cindric	Team Penske
- Time: 23.971

Most laps led
Driver	Justin Allgaier	JR Motorsports
- Laps: 184

Winner
No. 7	Justin Allgaier	JR Motorsports

Television in the United States
- Network: Fox Sports 1
- Announcers: Adam Alexander, Michael Waltrip, Regan Smith

Radio in the United States
- Radio: Motor Racing Network

The 2018 Iowa 250 presented by Enogen was the 14th stock car race of the 2018 NASCAR Xfinity Series season and the 8th iteration of the event. The race was held on Sunday, June 17, 2018, in Newton, Iowa at Iowa Speedway, a 7/8 mile (1.4 km) permanent D-shaped oval racetrack. The race took the scheduled 250 laps to complete. At race's end, JR Motorsports driver Justin Allgaier would dominate the race to win his seventh career NASCAR Xfinity Series win and his second of the season. To fill out the podium, Christopher Bell of Joe Gibbs Racing and Daniel Hemric of Richard Childress Racing would finish second and third, respectively.

== Background ==
Iowa Speedway is a 7/8-mile (1.4 km) paved oval motor racing track in Newton, Iowa, United States, approximately 30 miles (48 km) east of Des Moines. The track was designed with influence from Rusty Wallace and patterned after Richmond Raceway, a short track where Wallace was very successful. It has over 25,000 permanent seats as well as a unique multi-tiered Recreational Vehicle viewing area along the backstretch.

=== Entry list ===
#	Driver	Team	Make	Sponsor
0	Garrett Smithley	JD Motorsports	Chevrolet	JD Motorsports
00	Cole Custer	Stewart-Haas Racing with Biagi-DenBeste	Ford	Haas Automation
1	Elliott Sadler	JR Motorsports	Chevrolet	OneMain Financial "Lending Done Human"
01	Vinnie Miller	JD Motorsports	Chevrolet	JAS Expedited Trucking
2	Matt Tifft	Richard Childress Racing	Chevrolet	Wastebits
3	Shane Lee	Richard Childress Racing	Chevrolet	Childress Vineyards
4	Ross Chastain	JD Motorsports	Chevrolet	JD Motorsports
5	Michael Annett	JR Motorsports	Chevrolet	Northland Oil
7	Justin Allgaier	JR Motorsports	Chevrolet	Brandt Professional Agriculture
8	Blake Jones	B. J. McLeod Motorsports	Chevrolet	Tennessee Shine Company
9	Tyler Reddick	JR Motorsports	Chevrolet	BurgerFi
11	Ryan Truex	Kaulig Racing	Chevrolet	Phantom Fireworks
13	Timmy Hill	MBM Motorsports	Toyota	O.C.R. Gaz Bar
15	B. J. McLeod	JD Motorsports	Chevrolet	JD Motorsports
16	Ryan Reed	Roush Fenway Racing	Ford	DriveDownA1C.com
18	Riley Herbst	Joe Gibbs Racing	Toyota	Advance Auto Parts
19	Brandon Jones	Joe Gibbs Racing	Toyota	XYO Network
20	Christopher Bell	Joe Gibbs Racing	Toyota	Rheem
21	Daniel Hemric	Richard Childress Racing	Chevrolet	South Point Hotel, Casino & Spa
22	Austin Cindric	Team Penske	Ford	Fitzgerald Glider Kits
23	Justin Haley	GMS Racing	Chevrolet	Fraternal Order of Eagles
35	Joey Gase	Go Green Racing with SS-Green Light Racing	Chevrolet	Premier Millwright, Iowa Donor Network
36	Alex Labbé	DGM Racing	Chevrolet	Wholey's, Can-Am
38	Jeff Green	RSS Racing	Chevrolet	RSS Racing
39	Ryan Sieg	RSS Racing	Chevrolet	RSS Racing
40	Chad Finchum	MBM Motorsports	Toyota	Smithbilt Homes
42	John Hunter Nemechek	Chip Ganassi Racing	Chevrolet	Chevrolet Accessories
45	Josh Bilicki	JP Motorsports	Toyota	Prevagen
51	Jeremy Clements	Jeremy Clements Racing	Chevrolet	RepairableVehicles.com
52	David Starr	Jimmy Means Racing	Chevrolet	Circle Track Warehouse
55	Brandon Hightower	JP Motorsports	Toyota	Allgayer, Premier Recycling, LLC
60	Chase Briscoe	Roush Fenway Racing	Ford	Ford
61	Kaz Grala	Fury Race Cars	Ford	Nettts
66	Stan Mullis	MBM Motorsports	Chevrolet	LasVegas.net, TLC Resorts
74	Mike Harmon	Mike Harmon Racing	Chevrolet	Shadow Warriors Project, Koolbox ICE
76	Spencer Boyd	SS-Green Light Racing	Chevrolet	Grunt Style "This We'll Defend"
78	Tommy Joe Martins	B. J. McLeod Motorsports	Chevrolet	Riessen Construction
89	Morgan Shepherd	Shepherd Racing Ventures	Chevrolet	Visone RV Motorhome Parts, Racing with Jesus
90	Josh Williams	DGM Racing	Chevrolet	Bethel Glass & Shower Door, Sleep Well Sleep Disorder Specialists
93	J. J. Yeley	RSS Racing	Chevrolet	RSS Racing
Official entry list

== Practice ==
=== First practice ===
The first practice session was held on Saturday, June 16, at 2:05 PM CST, and would last for 50 minutes. Christopher Bell of Joe Gibbs Racing would set the fastest time in the session, with a lap of 24.270 and an average speed of 129.790 miles per hour (208.877 km/h).

Pos.	#	Driver	Team	Make	Time	Speed
1	20	Christopher Bell	Joe Gibbs Racing	Toyota	24.270	129.790
2	21	Daniel Hemric	Richard Childress Racing	Chevrolet	24.295	129.656
3	3	Shane Lee	Richard Childress Racing	Chevrolet	24.305	129.603
Full first practice results

=== Second and final practice ===
The second and final practice session, sometimes referred to as Happy Hour, was held on Saturday, June 16, at 4:40 PM CST, and would last for 50 minutes. Kaz Grala of Fury Race Cars would set the fastest time in the session, with a lap of 24.221 and an average speed of 130.052 miles per hour (209.298 km/h).

Pos.	#	Driver	Team	Make	Time	Speed
1	61	Kaz Grala	Fury Race Cars	Ford	24.221	130.052
2	9	Tyler Reddick	JR Motorsports	Chevrolet	24.334	129.449
3	21	Daniel Hemric	Richard Childress Racing	Chevrolet	24.369	129.263
Full Happy Hour practice results

== Qualifying ==
Qualifying was held on Sunday, June 17, at 1:35 PM CST. Since Iowa Speedway is under 2 miles (3.2 km), the qualifying system was a multi-car system that included three rounds. The first round was 15 minutes, where every driver would be able to set a lap within the 15 minutes. Then, the second round would consist of the fastest 24 cars in Round 1, and drivers would have 10 minutes to set a lap. Round 3 consisted of the fastest 12 drivers from Round 2, and the drivers would have 5 minutes to set a time. Whoever was fastest in Round 3 would win the pole.

Austin Cindric of Team Penske would win the pole after advancing from both preliminary rounds and setting the fastest lap in Round 3, with a time of 23.971 and an average speed of 131.409 miles per hour (211.482 km/h).

No drivers would fail to qualify.

=== Full qualifying results ===
Pos.	#	Driver	Team	Make	Time (R1)	Speed (R1)	Time (R2)	Speed (R2)	Time (R3)	Speed (R3)
1	22	Austin Cindric	Team Penske	Ford					23.971	131.409
2	21	Daniel Hemric	Richard Childress Racing	Chevrolet					24.048	130.988
3	19	Brandon Jones	Joe Gibbs Racing	Toyota					24.076	130.836
4	1	Elliott Sadler	JR Motorsports	Chevrolet					24.132	130.532
5	00	Cole Custer	Stewart-Haas Racing with Biagi-DenBeste	Ford					24.150	130.435
6	11	Ryan Truex	Kaulig Racing	Chevrolet					24.191	130.214
7	9	Tyler Reddick	JR Motorsports	Chevrolet					24.236	129.972
8	61	Kaz Grala	Fury Race Cars	Ford					24.259	129.849
9	18	Riley Herbst	Joe Gibbs Racing	Toyota					24.281	129.731
10	5	Michael Annett	JR Motorsports	Chevrolet					24.309	129.582
11	7	Justin Allgaier	JR Motorsports	Chevrolet					24.326	129.491
12	2	Matt Tifft	Richard Childress Racing	Chevrolet					24.364	129.289
Eliminated in Round 2
13	23	Justin Haley	GMS Racing	Chevrolet			24.187	130.235	—	—
14	3	Shane Lee	Richard Childress Racing	Chevrolet			24.187	130.235	—	—
15	42	John Hunter Nemechek	Chip Ganassi Racing	Chevrolet			24.201	130.160	—	—
16	4	Ross Chastain	JD Motorsports	Chevrolet			24.220	130.058	—	—
17	60	Ty Majeski	Roush Fenway Racing	Ford			24.229	130.009	—	—
18	36	Alex Labbé	DGM Racing	Chevrolet			24.363	129.294	—	—
19	51	Jeremy Clements	Jeremy Clements Racing	Chevrolet			24.390	129.151	—	—
20	0	Garrett Smithley	JD Motorsports	Chevrolet			24.500	128.571	—	—
21	39	Ryan Sieg	RSS Racing	Chevrolet			24.515	128.493	—	—
22	15	B. J. McLeod	JD Motorsports	Chevrolet			—	—	—	—
23	52	David Starr	Jimmy Means Racing	Chevrolet	24.559	128.263	—	—	—	—
24	38	Jeff Green	RSS Racing	Chevrolet	24.596	128.070	—	—	—	—
Eliminated in Round 1
25	78	Tommy Joe Martins	B. J. McLeod Motorsports	Chevrolet	24.613	127.981	—	—	—	—
26	76	Spencer Boyd	SS-Green Light Racing	Chevrolet	24.660	127.737	—	—	—	—
27	35	Joey Gase	Go Green Racing with SS-Green Light Racing	Chevrolet	24.674	127.665	—	—	—	—
28	55	Brandon Hightower	JP Motorsports	Toyota	24.829	126.868	—	—	—	—
29	40	Chad Finchum	MBM Motorsports	Toyota	24.843	126.796	—	—	—	—
30	89	Morgan Shepherd	Shepherd Racing Ventures	Chevrolet	24.855	126.735	—	—	—	—
31	93	J. J. Yeley	RSS Racing	Chevrolet	24.878	126.618	—	—	—	—
32	8	Blake Jones	B. J. McLeod Motorsports	Chevrolet	24.961	126.197	—	—	—	—
33	90	Josh Williams	DGM Racing	Chevrolet	25.087	125.563	—	—	—	—
Qualified by owner's points
34	45	Josh Bilicki	JP Motorsports	Toyota	25.097	125.513	—	—	—	—
35	13	Timmy Hill	MBM Motorsports	Toyota	25.178	125.109	—	—	—	—
36	01	Vinnie Miller	JD Motorsports	Chevrolet	25.216	124.921	—	—	—	—
37	74	Mike Harmon	Mike Harmon Racing	Chevrolet	25.885	121.692	—	—	—	—
38	66	Stan Mullis	MBM Motorsports	Chevrolet	26.314	119.708	—	—	—	—
39	20	Christopher Bell	Joe Gibbs Racing	Toyota	—	—	—	—	—	—
40	16	Ryan Reed	Roush Fenway Racing	Ford	—	—	—	—	—	—
Official starting lineup

== Race results ==
Stage 1 Laps: 60

Pos.	#	Driver	Team	Make	Pts
1	7	Justin Allgaier	JR Motorsports	Chevrolet	10
2	22	Austin Cindric	Team Penske	Ford	9
3	21	Daniel Hemric	Richard Childress Racing	Chevrolet	8
4	19	Brandon Jones	Joe Gibbs Racing	Toyota	7
5	00	Cole Custer	Stewart-Haas Racing with Biagi-DenBeste	Ford	6
6	20	Christopher Bell	Joe Gibbs Racing	Toyota	5
7	9	Tyler Reddick	JR Motorsports	Chevrolet	4
8	42	John Hunter Nemechek	Chip Ganassi Racing	Chevrolet	3
9	18	Riley Herbst	Joe Gibbs Racing	Toyota	0
10	3	Shane Lee	Richard Childress Racing	Chevrolet	1

Stage 2 Laps: 60

Pos.	#	Driver	Team	Make	Pts
1	7	Justin Allgaier	JR Motorsports	Chevrolet	10
2	21	Daniel Hemric	Richard Childress Racing	Chevrolet	9
3	20	Christopher Bell	Joe Gibbs Racing	Toyota	8
4	00	Cole Custer	Stewart-Haas Racing with Biagi-DenBeste	Ford	7
5	22	Austin Cindric	Team Penske	Ford	6
6	19	Brandon Jones	Joe Gibbs Racing	Toyota	5
7	18	Riley Herbst	Joe Gibbs Racing	Toyota	0
8	42	John Hunter Nemechek	Chip Ganassi Racing	Chevrolet	3
9	60	Ty Majeski	Roush Fenway Racing	Ford	2
10	16	Ryan Reed	Roush Fenway Racing	Ford	1

Stage 3 Laps: 130

Fin	St	#	Driver	Team	Make	Laps	Led	Status	Pts
1	11	7	Justin Allgaier	JR Motorsports	Chevrolet	250	182	running	60
2	39	20	Christopher Bell	Joe Gibbs Racing	Toyota	250	2	running	48
3	2	21	Daniel Hemric	Richard Childress Racing	Chevrolet	250	2	running	51
4	5	00	Cole Custer	Stewart-Haas Racing with Biagi-DenBeste	Ford	250	6	running	46
5	3	19	Brandon Jones	Joe Gibbs Racing	Toyota	250	0	running	44
6	9	18	Riley Herbst	Joe Gibbs Racing	Toyota	250	0	running	0
7	17	60	Ty Majeski	Roush Fenway Racing	Ford	250	0	running	32
8	7	9	Tyler Reddick	JR Motorsports	Chevrolet	250	0	running	33
9	12	2	Matt Tifft	Richard Childress Racing	Chevrolet	250	0	running	28
10	8	61	Kaz Grala	Fury Race Cars	Ford	250	0	running	27
11	1	22	Austin Cindric	Team Penske	Ford	250	58	running	41
12	13	23	Justin Haley	GMS Racing	Chevrolet	250	0	running	0
13	10	5	Michael Annett	JR Motorsports	Chevrolet	250	0	running	24
14	6	11	Ryan Truex	Kaulig Racing	Chevrolet	250	0	running	23
15	15	42	John Hunter Nemechek	Chip Ganassi Racing	Chevrolet	250	0	running	28
16	14	3	Shane Lee	Richard Childress Racing	Chevrolet	250	0	running	22
17	40	16	Ryan Reed	Roush Fenway Racing	Ford	250	0	running	21
18	21	39	Ryan Sieg	RSS Racing	Chevrolet	250	0	running	19
19	16	4	Ross Chastain	JD Motorsports	Chevrolet	249	0	running	18
20	19	51	Jeremy Clements	Jeremy Clements Racing	Chevrolet	249	0	running	17
21	27	35	Joey Gase	Go Green Racing with SS-Green Light Racing	Chevrolet	249	0	running	16
22	26	76	Spencer Boyd	SS-Green Light Racing	Chevrolet	247	0	running	15
23	18	36	Alex Labbé	DGM Racing	Chevrolet	247	0	running	14
24	23	52	David Starr	Jimmy Means Racing	Chevrolet	247	0	running	13
25	20	0	Garrett Smithley	JD Motorsports	Chevrolet	244	0	running	12
26	29	40	Chad Finchum	MBM Motorsports	Toyota	244	0	running	11
27	32	8	Blake Jones	B. J. McLeod Motorsports	Chevrolet	243	0	running	10
28	4	1	Elliott Sadler	JR Motorsports	Chevrolet	239	0	running	9
29	22	15	B. J. McLeod	JD Motorsports	Chevrolet	239	0	running	8
30	28	55	Brandon Hightower	JP Motorsports	Toyota	220	0	crash	7
31	36	01	Vinnie Miller	JD Motorsports	Chevrolet	205	0	overheating	6
32	25	78	Tommy Joe Martins	B. J. McLeod Motorsports	Chevrolet	201	0	running	5
33	38	66	Stan Mullis	MBM Motorsports	Chevrolet	150	0	running	4
34	33	90	Josh Williams	DGM Racing	Chevrolet	134	0	electrical	3
35	24	38	Jeff Green	RSS Racing	Chevrolet	131	0	driveshaft	2
36	34	45	Josh Bilicki	JP Motorsports	Toyota	95	0	fuel pump	1
37	35	13	Timmy Hill	MBM Motorsports	Toyota	75	0	brakes	1
38	37	74	Mike Harmon	Mike Harmon Racing	Chevrolet	31	0	rear gear	1
39	30	89	Morgan Shepherd	Shepherd Racing Ventures	Chevrolet	28	0	brakes	1
40	31	93	J. J. Yeley	RSS Racing	Chevrolet	21	0	vibration	1
Official race results

Previous race: 2018 LTi Printing 250	NASCAR Xfinity Series; 2018 season	Next race: 2018 Overton's 300
