= 2018 LTi Printing 250 =

13th race of the 2018 NASCAR Xfinity Series

Race details
- Race 13 of 33 of the 2018 NASCAR Xfinity Series
- Date: June 9, 2018
- Official name: 27th Annual LTi Printing 250
- Location: Brooklyn, Michigan, Michigan International Speedway
- Course: Permanent racing facility
- Course length: 2.0 miles (3.2 km)
- Distance: 91 laps, 182 mi (292.901 km)
- Scheduled distance: 125 laps, 250 mi (402.336 km)
- Average speed: 103.067 miles per hour (165.870 km/h)

Pole position
Driver	Kyle Busch	Joe Gibbs Racing
- Time: Set by 2018 owner's points

Most laps led
Driver	Kyle Busch	Joe Gibbs Racing
- Laps: 29

Winner
No. 3	Austin Dillon	Richard Childress Racing

Television in the United States
- Network: FOX/FS2
- Announcers: Adam Alexander, Michael Waltrip, Joey Logano

Radio in the United States
- Radio: Motor Racing Network

The 2018 LTi Printing 250 was the 13th stock car race of the 2018 NASCAR Xfinity Series season, and the 27th iteration of the event. The race was held on Saturday, June 9, 2018, in Brooklyn, Michigan at Michigan International Speedway, a two-mile (3.2 km) permanent moderate-banked D-shaped speedway. The race was shortened from 125 laps to 91 due to rain stopping the race. At race's end, Austin Dillon of Richard Childress Racing would win a rain-shortened race after battling with teammate Daniel Hemric in a one-lap shootout during a restart. The win was Dillon's ninth and so far final career win in the NASCAR Xfinity Series and his first and only of the season. To fill out the podium, Cole Custer of Stewart-Haas Racing with Biagi-DenBeste would finish third.

== Background ==
The layout of Michigan International Speedway, the venue where the race was held.

The race was held at Michigan International Speedway, a two-mile (3.2 km) moderate-banked D-shaped speedway located in Brooklyn, Michigan. The track is used primarily for NASCAR events. It is known as a "sister track" to Texas World Speedway as MIS's oval design was a direct basis of TWS, with moderate modifications to the banking in the corners, and was used as the basis of Auto Club Speedway. The track is owned by International Speedway Corporation. Michigan International Speedway is recognized as one of motorsports' premier facilities because of its wide racing surface and high banking (by open-wheel standards; the 18-degree banking is modest by stock car standards).

=== Entry list ===
#	Driver	Team	Make	Sponsor
0	Garrett Smithley	JD Motorsports	Chevrolet	VehicleKeys.com
00	Cole Custer	Stewart-Haas Racing with Biagi-DenBeste	Ford	Code 3 Associates
1	Elliott Sadler	JR Motorsports	Chevrolet	OneMain Financial "Lending Done Human"
01	Vinnie Miller	JD Motorsports	Chevrolet	JAS Expedited Trucking
2	Matt Tifft	Richard Childress Racing	Chevrolet	Nexteer
3	Austin Dillon	Richard Childress Racing	Chevrolet	Cabela's, Bass Pro Shops
4	Ross Chastain	JD Motorsports	Chevrolet	Flex Seal
5	Michael Annett	JR Motorsports	Chevrolet	TMC Transportation
7	Justin Allgaier	JR Motorsports	Chevrolet	Brandt Professional Agriculture
8	Caesar Bacarella	B. J. McLeod Motorsports	Chevrolet	Maxim, Alpha Prime Regimen
9	Tyler Reddick	JR Motorsports	Chevrolet	Nationwide Children's Hospital
11	Ryan Truex	Kaulig Racing	Chevrolet	Phantom Fireworks
15	Matt Mills	JD Motorsports	Chevrolet	Flex Glue
16	Ryan Reed	Roush Fenway Racing	Ford	DriveDownA1C.com
18	Kyle Busch	Joe Gibbs Racing	Toyota	Maltesers
19	Brandon Jones	Joe Gibbs Racing	Toyota	XYO Network
20	Christopher Bell	Joe Gibbs Racing	Toyota	Rheem
21	Daniel Hemric	Richard Childress Racing	Chevrolet	South Point Hotel, Casino & Spa
22	Paul Menard	Team Penske	Ford	Menards, Richmond Water Heaters
23	Alex Bowman	GMS Racing	Chevrolet	ISM Connect Patriotic
28	Dylan Lupton*	JGL Racing	Ford	Fatal Clothing
35	Joey Gase	Go Green Racing with SS-Green Light Racing	Chevrolet	Sparks Energy
36	Alex Labbé	DGM Racing	Chevrolet	Wholey's, Can-Am
38	Jeff Green	RSS Racing	Chevrolet	RSS Racing
39	Ryan Sieg	RSS Racing	Chevrolet	Lombard Brothers Gaming
40	Chad Finchum	MBM Motorsports	Toyota	Smithbilt Homes
42	John Hunter Nemechek	Chip Ganassi Racing	Chevrolet	Chevrolet Accessories
45	Josh Bilicki	JP Motorsports	Toyota	Prevagen
51	Jeremy Clements	Jeremy Clements Racing	Chevrolet	RepairableVehicles.com
52	David Starr	Jimmy Means Racing	Chevrolet	Pro Waste Services, Joe B's 1,000th Race "Forever the Man"
55	Brandon Hightower	JP Motorsports	Toyota	Timmons Truck Center, Premier Recycling, LLC
60	Austin Cindric	Roush Fenway Racing	Ford	LTi Printing
61	Kaz Grala	Fury Race Cars	Ford	Nettts
66	Timmy Hill	MBM Motorsports	Dodge	MBM Motorsports
74	B. J. McLeod	Mike Harmon Racing	Chevrolet	Shadow Warriors Project, Horizon Transport
76	Spencer Boyd	SS-Green Light Racing	Chevrolet	Grunt Style "This We'll Defend"
78	Tommy Joe Martins	B. J. McLeod Motorsports	Chevrolet	B. J. McLeod Motorsports
89	Morgan Shepherd	Shepherd Racing Ventures	Chevrolet	Visone RV
90	Josh Williams	DGM Racing	Chevrolet	Bethel Glass & Shower Door, Sleep Well Sleep Disorder Specialists
93	J. J. Yeley	RSS Racing	Chevrolet	RSS Racing
98	Kevin Harvick	Stewart-Haas Racing with Biagi-DenBeste	Ford	FIELDS
Official entry list

*Withdrew.

== Practice ==
=== First practice ===
The first 50-minute practice session would occur on Friday, June 8, at 1:05 PM EST. Kyle Busch of Joe Gibbs Racing would set the fastest time in the session, with a time of 41.006 and an average speed of 175.584 miles per hour (282.575 km/h).

Pos.	#	Driver	Team	Make	Time	Speed
1	18	Kyle Busch	Joe Gibbs Racing	Toyota	41.006	175.584
2	42	John Hunter Nemechek	Chip Ganassi Racing	Chevrolet	41.076	175.285
3	7	Justin Allgaier	JR Motorsports	Chevrolet	41.080	175.268
Full first practice results

=== Second and final practice ===
The last 50-minute practice session, sometimes referred to as Happy Hour, would occur on Friday, June 8, at 3:05 PM EST. Austin Dillon of Richard Childress Racing would set the fastest time in the session, with a time of 40.677 and an average speed of 177.004 miles per hour (284.860 km/h).

Pos.	#	Driver	Team	Make	Time	Speed
1	3	Austin Dillon	Richard Childress Racing	Chevrolet	40.677	177.004
2	11	Ryan Truex	Kaulig Racing	Chevrolet	40.779	176.561
3	1	Elliott Sadler	JR Motorsports	Chevrolet	40.857	176.224
Full second practice results

== Starting lineup ==
Qualifying was scheduled to occur on Saturday, June 9, at 10:05 AM EST. Since Michigan International Speedway is at least 2 miles (3.2 km), the qualifying system was a single car, single lap, two round system where in the first round, everyone would set a time to determine positions 13–40. Then, the fastest 12 qualifiers would move on to the second round to determine positions 1–12.

However, rain would cancel qualifying, and the starting lineup was therefore made by the rulebook, with the top 30 set by owner's points and positions 31-40 set by champion's provisionals and owner attempts. As a result, Kyle Busch of Joe Gibbs Racing would win the pole.

No drivers would fail to qualify.

=== Full starting lineup ===
Pos.	#	Driver	Team	Make
1	18	Kyle Busch	Joe Gibbs Racing	Toyota
2	22	Paul Menard	Team Penske	Ford
3	1	Elliott Sadler	JR Motorsports	Chevrolet
4	00	Cole Custer	Stewart-Haas Racing with Biagi-DenBeste	Ford
5	21	Daniel Hemric	Richard Childress Racing	Chevrolet
6	9	Tyler Reddick	JR Motorsports	Chevrolet
7	20	Christopher Bell	Joe Gibbs Racing	Toyota
8	42	John Hunter Nemechek	Chip Ganassi Racing	Chevrolet
9	7	Justin Allgaier	JR Motorsports	Chevrolet
10	23	Alex Bowman	GMS Racing	Chevrolet
11	19	Brandon Jones	Joe Gibbs Racing	Toyota
12	11	Ryan Truex	Kaulig Racing	Chevrolet
13	3	Austin Dillon	Richard Childress Racing	Chevrolet
14	2	Matt Tifft	Richard Childress Racing	Chevrolet
15	16	Ryan Reed	Roush Fenway Racing	Ford
16	4	Ross Chastain	JD Motorsports	Chevrolet
17	5	Michael Annett	JR Motorsports	Chevrolet
18	39	Ryan Sieg	RSS Racing	Chevrolet
19	35	Joey Gase	Go Green Racing with SS-Green Light Racing	Chevrolet
20	36	Alex Labbé	DGM Racing	Chevrolet
21	51	Jeremy Clements	Jeremy Clements Racing	Chevrolet
22	0	Garrett Smithley	JD Motorsports	Chevrolet
23	8	Caesar Bacarella	B. J. McLeod Motorsports	Chevrolet
24	98	Kevin Harvick	Stewart-Haas Racing with Biagi-DenBeste	Ford
25	78	Tommy Joe Martins	B. J. McLeod Motorsports	Chevrolet
26	90	Josh Williams	DGM Racing	Chevrolet
27	38	J. J. Yeley	RSS Racing	Chevrolet
28	52	David Starr	Jimmy Means Racing	Chevrolet
29	60	Austin Cindric	Roush Fenway Racing	Ford
30	15	Matt Mills	JD Motorsports	Chevrolet
Champion's Provisional
31	93	Jeff Green	RSS Racing	Chevrolet
Qualified by attempts made
32	01	Vinnie Miller	JD Motorsports	Chevrolet
33	45	Josh Bilicki	JP Motorsports	Toyota
34	76	Spencer Boyd	SS-Green Light Racing	Chevrolet
35	55	Brandon Hightower	JP Motorsports	Toyota
36	40	Chad Finchum	MBM Motorsports	Toyota
37	66	Timmy Hill	MBM Motorsports	Dodge
38	74	B. J. McLeod	Mike Harmon Racing	Chevrolet
39	89	Morgan Shepherd	Shepherd Racing Ventures	Chevrolet
40	61	Kaz Grala	Fury Race Cars	Ford
Withdrew
WD	28	Dylan Lupton	JGL Racing	Ford
Official starting lineup

== Race results ==
Stage 1 Laps: 30

Pos.	#	Driver	Team	Make	Pts
1	18	Kyle Busch	Joe Gibbs Racing	Toyota	0
2	42	John Hunter Nemechek	Chip Ganassi Racing	Chevrolet	9
3	16	Ryan Reed	Roush Fenway Racing	Ford	8
4	00	Cole Custer	Stewart-Haas Racing with Biagi-DenBeste	Ford	7
5	19	Brandon Jones	Joe Gibbs Racing	Toyota	6
6	11	Ryan Truex	Kaulig Racing	Chevrolet	5
7	1	Elliott Sadler	JR Motorsports	Chevrolet	4
8	61	Kaz Grala	Fury Race Cars	Ford	3
9	3	Austin Dillon	Richard Childress Racing	Chevrolet	0
10	98	Kevin Harvick	Stewart-Haas Racing with Biagi-DenBeste	Ford	0

Stage 2 Laps: 30

Pos.	#	Driver	Team	Make	Pts
1	1	Elliott Sadler	JR Motorsports	Chevrolet	10
2	11	Ryan Truex	Kaulig Racing	Chevrolet	9
3	16	Ryan Reed	Roush Fenway Racing	Ford	8
4	2	Matt Tifft	Richard Childress Racing	Chevrolet	7
5	61	Kaz Grala	Fury Race Cars	Ford	6
6	4	Ross Chastain	JD Motorsports	Chevrolet	5
7	60	Austin Cindric	Roush Fenway Racing	Ford	4
8	3	Austin Dillon	Richard Childress Racing	Chevrolet	0
9	20	Christopher Bell	Joe Gibbs Racing	Toyota	2
10	00	Cole Custer	Stewart-Haas Racing with Biagi-DenBeste	Ford	1

Stage 3 Laps: 31

Fin	St	#	Driver	Team	Make	Laps	Led	Status	Pts
1	13	3	Austin Dillon	Richard Childress Racing	Chevrolet	91	18	running	0
2	5	21	Daniel Hemric	Richard Childress Racing	Chevrolet	91	1	running	35
3	4	00	Cole Custer	Stewart-Haas Racing with Biagi-DenBeste	Ford	91	0	running	42
4	15	16	Ryan Reed	Roush Fenway Racing	Ford	91	1	running	49
5	2	22	Paul Menard	Team Penske	Ford	91	8	running	0
6	1	18	Kyle Busch	Joe Gibbs Racing	Toyota	91	29	running	0
7	6	9	Tyler Reddick	JR Motorsports	Chevrolet	91	0	running	30
8	24	98	Kevin Harvick	Stewart-Haas Racing with Biagi-DenBeste	Ford	91	11	running	0
9	9	7	Justin Allgaier	JR Motorsports	Chevrolet	91	0	running	28
10	12	11	Ryan Truex	Kaulig Racing	Chevrolet	91	0	running	41
11	7	20	Christopher Bell	Joe Gibbs Racing	Toyota	91	0	running	28
12	40	61	Kaz Grala	Fury Race Cars	Ford	91	5	running	34
13	8	42	John Hunter Nemechek	Chip Ganassi Racing	Chevrolet	91	0	running	33
14	16	4	Ross Chastain	JD Motorsports	Chevrolet	91	0	running	28
15	21	51	Jeremy Clements	Jeremy Clements Racing	Chevrolet	91	0	running	22
16	14	2	Matt Tifft	Richard Childress Racing	Chevrolet	91	0	running	28
17	17	5	Michael Annett	JR Motorsports	Chevrolet	91	0	running	20
18	11	19	Brandon Jones	Joe Gibbs Racing	Toyota	91	0	running	25
19	18	39	Ryan Sieg	RSS Racing	Chevrolet	91	0	running	18
20	27	38	J. J. Yeley	RSS Racing	Chevrolet	91	0	running	17
21	10	23	Alex Bowman	GMS Racing	Chevrolet	91	8	running	0
22	34	76	Spencer Boyd	SS-Green Light Racing	Chevrolet	91	0	running	15
23	29	60	Austin Cindric	Roush Fenway Racing	Ford	91	0	running	18
24	25	78	Tommy Joe Martins	B. J. McLeod Motorsports	Chevrolet	91	0	running	13
25	32	01	Vinnie Miller	JD Motorsports	Chevrolet	91	0	running	12
26	22	0	Garrett Smithley	JD Motorsports	Chevrolet	91	0	running	11
27	33	45	Josh Bilicki	JP Motorsports	Toyota	91	0	running	10
28	38	74	B. J. McLeod	Mike Harmon Racing	Chevrolet	91	0	running	9
29	36	40	Chad Finchum	MBM Motorsports	Toyota	91	0	running	8
30	3	1	Elliott Sadler	JR Motorsports	Chevrolet	91	10	running	21
31	37	66	Timmy Hill	MBM Motorsports	Dodge	90	0	running	6
32	26	90	Josh Williams	DGM Racing	Chevrolet	89	0	transmission	5
33	28	52	David Starr	Jimmy Means Racing	Chevrolet	82	0	crash	4
34	23	8	Caesar Bacarella	B. J. McLeod Motorsports	Chevrolet	79	0	crash	3
35	35	55	Brandon Hightower	JP Motorsports	Toyota	79	0	crash	2
36	30	15	Matt Mills	JD Motorsports	Chevrolet	54	0	crash	1
37	20	36	Alex Labbé	DGM Racing	Chevrolet	52	0	crash	1
38	39	89	Morgan Shepherd	Shepherd Racing Ventures	Chevrolet	34	0	brakes	1
39	19	35	Joey Gase	Go Green Racing with SS-Green Light Racing	Chevrolet	33	0	overheating	1
40	31	93	Jeff Green	RSS Racing	Chevrolet	5	0	vibration	1
Withdrew
WD		28	Dylan Lupton	JGL Racing	Ford				
Official race results

Previous race: 2018 Pocono Green 250	NASCAR Xfinity Series; 2018 season	Next race: 2018 Iowa 250
