= 2018 Lakes Region 200 =

18th race of the 2018 NASCAR Xfinity Series

Race details
- Race 18 of 33 of the 2018 NASCAR Xfinity Series
- Date: July 21, 2018
- Official name: 26th Annual Lakes Region 200
- Location: Loudon, New Hampshire, New Hampshire Motor Speedway
- Course: Permanent racing facility
- Course length: 1.058 miles (1.703 km)
- Distance: 200 laps, 211.6 mi (340.537 km)
- Scheduled distance: 200 laps, 211.6 mi (340.537 km)
- Average speed: 99.616 miles per hour (160.316 km/h)

Pole position
Driver	Brad Keselowski	Team Penske
- Time: 29.232

Most laps led
Driver	Christopher Bell	Joe Gibbs Racing
- Laps: 93

Winner
No. 20	Christopher Bell	Joe Gibbs Racing

Television in the United States
- Network: NBCSN
- Announcers: Rick Allen, Jeff Burton, Steve Letarte, Dale Earnhardt Jr.

Radio in the United States
- Radio: Motor Racing Network

The 2018 Lakes Region 200 was the 18th stock car race of the 2018 NASCAR Xfinity Series season, and the 29th iteration of the event. The race was held on Saturday, July 21, 2018, in Loudon, New Hampshire, at New Hampshire Motor Speedway a 1.058 miles (1.703 km) permanent, oval-shaped, low-banked racetrack. The race took the scheduled 200 laps to complete. At race's end, Christopher Bell of Joe Gibbs Racing would pit for four tires on the final round of pit stops compared to second-place finisher's Team Penske driver Brad Keselowski, who only took two tires. The strategy for Bell proved to be a winning strategy for Bell, as he would hold off Keselowski for the win to win his fourth career NASCAR Xfinity Series win, his third of the season, and his second consecutive win in the series. To fill out the podium, Ryan Preece of Joe Gibbs Racing would finish third.

== Background ==
The layout of New Hampshire Motor Speedway, the venue where the race was held.

New Hampshire Motor Speedway is a 1.058-mile (1.703 km) oval speedway located in Loudon, New Hampshire, which has hosted NASCAR racing annually since the early 1990s, as well as the longest-running motorcycle race in North America, the Loudon Classic. Nicknamed "The Magic Mile", the speedway is often converted into a 1.6-mile (2.6 km) road course, which includes much of the oval.

The track was originally the site of Bryar Motorsports Park before being purchased and redeveloped by Bob Bahre. The track is currently one of eight major NASCAR tracks owned and operated by Speedway Motorsports.

=== Entry list ===
#	Driver	Team	Make	Sponsor
0	Garrett Smithley	JD Motorsports	Chevrolet	JD Motorsports
00	Cole Custer	Stewart-Haas Racing with Biagi-DenBeste	Ford	Haas Automation
1	Elliott Sadler	JR Motorsports	Chevrolet	OneMain Financial "Lending Done Human"
01	Vinnie Miller	JD Motorsports	Chevrolet	JD Motorsports
2	Matt Tifft	Richard Childress Racing	Chevrolet	National Brain Tumor Society
3	Austin Dillon	Richard Childress Racing	Chevrolet	Cabela's, Bass Pro Shops
4	Ross Chastain	JD Motorsports	Chevrolet	JD Motorsports
5	Michael Annett	JR Motorsports	Chevrolet	TMC Transportation
7	Justin Allgaier	JR Motorsports	Chevrolet	Dove Men + Care
8	Angela Ruch	B. J. McLeod Motorsports	Chevrolet	JW Transport, Give A Child A Voice
9	Tyler Reddick	JR Motorsports	Chevrolet	Takl
11	Ryan Truex	Kaulig Racing	Chevrolet	Phantom Fireworks
13	Timmy Hill	MBM Motorsports	Toyota	OCR Gaz Bar
15	B. J. McLeod	JD Motorsports	Chevrolet	JD Motorsports
16	Ryan Reed	Roush Fenway Racing	Ford	DriveDownA1C.com
18	Ryan Preece	Joe Gibbs Racing	Toyota	Falmouth Ready Mix, Mizzy Construction
19	Brandon Jones	Joe Gibbs Racing	Toyota	XYO Network
20	Christopher Bell	Joe Gibbs Racing	Toyota	Rheem
21	Daniel Hemric	Richard Childress Racing	Chevrolet	South Point Hotel, Casino & Spa
22	Brad Keselowski	Team Penske	Ford	Menards, Richmond Water Heaters
23	Johnny Sauter	GMS Racing	Chevrolet	ISM Connect
35	Joey Gase	Go Green Racing with SS-Green Light Racing	Chevrolet	Sparks Energy
36	Alex Labbé	DGM Racing	Chevrolet	RoyAuto.com, Outil Mag
38	J. J. Yeley	RSS Racing	Chevrolet	RSS Racing
39	Ryan Sieg	RSS Racing	Chevrolet	RSS Racing
40	Chad Finchum	MBM Motorsports	Toyota	Smithbilt Homes
42	John Hunter Nemechek	Chip Ganassi Racing	Chevrolet	D. A. B. Constructors, Inc.
45	Josh Bilicki	JP Motorsports	Toyota	Prevagen
51	Jeremy Clements	Jeremy Clements Racing	Chevrolet	RepairableVehicles.com
52	David Starr	Jimmy Means Racing	Chevrolet	Jimmy Means Racing
55	Bayley Currey	JP Motorsports	Toyota	Prevagen
60	Austin Cindric	Roush Fenway Racing	Ford	Pirtek
61	Kaz Grala	Fury Race Cars	Ford	IT Coalition
66	Carl Long	MBM Motorsports	Chevrolet	LasVegas.net, TLC Resorts
74	Mike Harmon	Mike Harmon Racing	Chevrolet	Shadow Warriors Project, Horizon Transport
76	Spencer Boyd	SS-Green Light Racing	Chevrolet	Grunt Style "This We'll Defend"
78	Tommy Joe Martins	B. J. McLeod Motorsports	Chevrolet	B. J. McLeod Motorsports
89	Morgan Shepherd	Shepherd Racing Ventures	Chevrolet	Visone RV Motorhome Parts, Racing with Jesus
90	Donald Theetge	DGM Racing	Chevrolet	Circuit Acura, Mercedes-Benz St-Nicholas
93	Jeff Green	RSS Racing	Chevrolet	RSS Racing
Official entry list

== Practice ==
=== First practice ===
The first practice session was held on Friday, July 20, at 1:05 PM EST, and would last for 50 minutes. Brad Keselowski of Team Penske would set the fastest time in the session, with a lap of 29.747 and an average speed of 128.040 miles per hour (206.060 km/h).

Pos.	#	Driver	Team	Make	Time	Speed
1	22	Brad Keselowski	Team Penske	Ford	29.747	128.040
2	00	Cole Custer	Stewart-Haas Racing with Biagi-DenBeste	Ford	29.845	127.619
3	18	Ryan Preece	Joe Gibbs Racing	Toyota	29.875	127.491
Full first practice results

=== Second and final practice ===
The second and final practice session, sometimes referred to as Happy Hour, was held on Friday, July 20, at 3:05 PM EST, and would last for 50 minutes. Ryan Truex of Kaulig Racing would set the fastest time in the session, with a lap of 29.747 and an average speed of 128.040 miles per hour (206.060 km/h).

Pos.	#	Driver	Team	Make	Time	Speed
1	11	Ryan Truex	Kaulig Racing	Chevrolet	29.549	128.898
2	22	Brad Keselowski	Team Penske	Ford	29.660	128.415
3	20	Christopher Bell	Joe Gibbs Racing	Toyota	29.751	128.023
Full Happy Hour practice results

== Qualifying ==
Qualifying was held on Saturday, July 21, at 11:05 AM EST. Since New Hampshire Motor Speedway is under 2 miles (3.2 km), the qualifying system was a multi-car system that included three rounds. The first round was 15 minutes, where every driver would be able to set a lap within the 15 minutes. Then, the second round would consist of the fastest 24 cars in Round 1, and drivers would have 10 minutes to set a lap. Round 3 consisted of the fastest 12 drivers from Round 2, and the drivers would have 5 minutes to set a time. Whoever was fastest in Round 3 would win the pole.

Brad Keselowski of Team Penske would win the pole, advancing through both preliminary rounds and setting a time of 29.232 and an average speed of 130.296 miles per hour (209.691 km/h) in the third round.

No drivers would fail to qualify.

=== Full qualifying results ===
Pos.	#	Driver	Team	Make	Time (R1)	Speed (R1)	Time (R2)	Speed (R2)	Time (R3)	Speed (R3)
1	22	Brad Keselowski	Team Penske	Ford	29.739	128.074	29.290	130.038	29.232	130.296
2	20	Christopher Bell	Joe Gibbs Racing	Toyota	29.514	129.051	29.268	130.135	29.270	130.126
3	18	Ryan Preece	Joe Gibbs Racing	Toyota	29.521	129.020	29.392	129.586	29.277	130.095
4	00	Cole Custer	Stewart-Haas Racing with Biagi-DenBeste	Ford	29.573	128.793	29.337	129.829	29.325	129.882
5	42	John Hunter Nemechek	Chip Ganassi Racing	Chevrolet	29.897	127.397	29.533	128.968	29.335	129.838
6	21	Daniel Hemric	Richard Childress Racing	Chevrolet	29.316	129.922	29.283	130.069	29.362	129.719
7	7	Justin Allgaier	JR Motorsports	Chevrolet	29.477	129.213	29.513	129.055	29.387	129.608
8	19	Brandon Jones	Joe Gibbs Racing	Toyota	29.797	127.825	29.484	129.182	29.441	129.371
9	9	Tyler Reddick	JR Motorsports	Chevrolet	29.889	127.431	29.479	129.204	29.496	129.129
10	1	Elliott Sadler	JR Motorsports	Chevrolet	29.719	128.160	29.463	129.274	29.503	129.099
11	3	Austin Dillon	Richard Childress Racing	Chevrolet	29.971	127.083	29.485	129.178	29.687	128.299
12	23	Johnny Sauter	GMS Racing	Chevrolet	30.027	126.846	29.546	128.911	29.816	127.743
Eliminated in Round 2
13	11	Ryan Truex	Kaulig Racing	Chevrolet	29.829	127.688	29.561	128.845	—	—
14	2	Matt Tifft	Richard Childress Racing	Chevrolet	29.744	128.053	29.570	128.806	—	—
15	60	Austin Cindric	Roush Fenway Racing	Ford	29.780	127.898	29.682	128.320	—	—
16	61	Kaz Grala	Fury Race Cars	Ford	29.867	127.525	29.707	128.212	—	—
17	39	Ryan Sieg	RSS Racing	Chevrolet	29.594	128.702	29.756	128.001	—	—
18	51	Jeremy Clements	Jeremy Clements Racing	Chevrolet	29.949	127.176	29.920	127.299	—	—
19	5	Michael Annett	JR Motorsports	Chevrolet	29.966	127.104	29.926	127.274	—	—
20	4	Ross Chastain	JD Motorsports	Chevrolet	30.092	126.572	29.961	127.125	—	—
21	36	Alex Labbé	DGM Racing	Chevrolet	30.036	126.808	30.153	126.316	—	—
22	35	Joey Gase	Go Green Racing with SS-Green Light Racing	Chevrolet	30.152	126.320	30.252	125.902	—	—
23	38	J. J. Yeley	RSS Racing	Chevrolet	30.127	126.425	30.496	124.895	—	—
24	16	Ryan Reed	Roush Fenway Racing	Ford	29.703	128.229	—	—	—	—
Eliminated in Round 1
25	78	Tommy Joe Martins	B. J. McLeod Motorsports	Chevrolet	30.358	125.463	—	—	—	—
26	15	B. J. McLeod	JD Motorsports	Chevrolet	30.430	125.166	—	—	—	—
27	52	David Starr	Jimmy Means Racing	Chevrolet	30.474	124.985	—	—	—	—
28	0	Garrett Smithley	JD Motorsports	Chevrolet	30.615	124.410	—	—	—	—
29	76	Spencer Boyd	SS-Green Light Racing	Chevrolet	30.657	124.239	—	—	—	—
30	90	Donald Theetge	DGM Racing	Chevrolet	30.670	124.187	—	—	—	—
31	93	Jeff Green	RSS Racing	Chevrolet	30.703	124.053	—	—	—	—
32	13	Timmy Hill	MBM Motorsports	Toyota	30.789	123.707	—	—	—	—
33	45	Josh Bilicki	JP Motorsports	Toyota	30.808	123.630	—	—	—	—
Qualified by owner's points
34	40	Chad Finchum	MBM Motorsports	Toyota	30.864	123.406	—	—	—	—
35	01	Vinnie Miller	JD Motorsports	Chevrolet	31.006	122.841	—	—	—	—
36	89	Morgan Shepherd	Shepherd Racing Ventures	Chevrolet	31.038	122.714	—	—	—	—
37	55	Bayley Currey	JP Motorsports	Toyota	31.109	122.434	—	—	—	—
38	66	Carl Long	MBM Motorsports	Chevrolet	31.118	122.399	—	—	—	—
39	74	Mike Harmon	Mike Harmon Racing	Chevrolet	31.956	119.189	—	—	—	—
40	8	Angela Ruch	B. J. McLeod Motorsports	Chevrolet	32.093	118.680	—	—	—	—
Official qualifying results
Official starting lineup

== Race results ==
Stage 1 Laps: 45

Pos.	#	Driver	Team	Make	Pts
1	20	Christopher Bell	Joe Gibbs Racing	Toyota	10
2	18	Ryan Preece	Joe Gibbs Racing	Toyota	9
3	42	John Hunter Nemechek	Chip Ganassi Racing	Chevrolet	8
4	21	Daniel Hemric	Richard Childress Racing	Chevrolet	7
5	22	Brad Keselowski	Team Penske	Ford	0
6	19	Brandon Jones	Joe Gibbs Racing	Toyota	5
7	00	Cole Custer	Stewart-Haas Racing with Biagi-DenBeste	Ford	4
8	7	Justin Allgaier	JR Motorsports	Chevrolet	3
9	2	Matt Tifft	Richard Childress Racing	Chevrolet	2
10	1	Elliott Sadler	JR Motorsports	Chevrolet	1

Stage 2 Laps: 45

Pos.	#	Driver	Team	Make	Pts
1	22	Brad Keselowski	Team Penske	Ford	0
2	21	Daniel Hemric	Richard Childress Racing	Chevrolet	9
3	18	Ryan Preece	Joe Gibbs Racing	Toyota	8
4	19	Brandon Jones	Joe Gibbs Racing	Toyota	7
5	42	John Hunter Nemechek	Chip Ganassi Racing	Chevrolet	6
6	1	Elliott Sadler	JR Motorsports	Chevrolet	5
7	60	Austin Cindric	Roush Fenway Racing	Ford	4
8	20	Christopher Bell	Joe Gibbs Racing	Toyota	3
9	39	Ryan Sieg	RSS Racing	Chevrolet	2
10	2	Matt Tifft	Richard Childress Racing	Chevrolet	1

Stage 3 Laps: 110

Fin	St	#	Driver	Team	Make	Laps	Led	Status	Pts
1	2	20	Christopher Bell	Joe Gibbs Racing	Toyota	200	93	running	53
2	1	22	Brad Keselowski	Team Penske	Ford	200	72	running	0
3	3	18	Ryan Preece	Joe Gibbs Racing	Toyota	200	6	running	51
4	5	42	John Hunter Nemechek	Chip Ganassi Racing	Chevrolet	200	0	running	47
5	14	2	Matt Tifft	Richard Childress Racing	Chevrolet	200	0	running	35
6	8	19	Brandon Jones	Joe Gibbs Racing	Toyota	200	0	running	43
7	7	7	Justin Allgaier	JR Motorsports	Chevrolet	200	0	running	33
8	10	1	Elliott Sadler	JR Motorsports	Chevrolet	200	26	running	35
9	4	00	Cole Custer	Stewart-Haas Racing with Biagi-DenBeste	Ford	200	0	running	32
10	11	3	Austin Dillon	Richard Childress Racing	Chevrolet	200	0	running	0
11	6	21	Daniel Hemric	Richard Childress Racing	Chevrolet	200	3	running	42
12	24	16	Ryan Reed	Roush Fenway Racing	Ford	200	0	running	25
13	13	11	Ryan Truex	Kaulig Racing	Chevrolet	200	0	running	24
14	16	61	Kaz Grala	Fury Race Cars	Ford	200	0	running	23
15	17	39	Ryan Sieg	RSS Racing	Chevrolet	200	0	running	24
16	19	5	Michael Annett	JR Motorsports	Chevrolet	200	0	running	21
17	15	60	Austin Cindric	Roush Fenway Racing	Ford	200	0	running	24
18	18	51	Jeremy Clements	Jeremy Clements Racing	Chevrolet	200	0	running	19
19	12	23	Johnny Sauter	GMS Racing	Chevrolet	199	0	running	0
20	25	78	Tommy Joe Martins	B. J. McLeod Motorsports	Chevrolet	199	0	running	17
21	34	40	Chad Finchum	MBM Motorsports	Toyota	198	0	running	16
22	22	35	Joey Gase	Go Green Racing with SS-Green Light Racing	Chevrolet	198	0	running	15
23	21	36	Alex Labbé	DGM Racing	Chevrolet	198	0	running	14
24	29	76	Spencer Boyd	SS-Green Light Racing	Chevrolet	198	0	running	13
25	9	9	Tyler Reddick	JR Motorsports	Chevrolet	196	0	running	12
26	20	4	Ross Chastain	JD Motorsports	Chevrolet	196	0	running	11
27	35	01	Vinnie Miller	JD Motorsports	Chevrolet	195	0	running	10
28	27	52	David Starr	Jimmy Means Racing	Chevrolet	195	0	running	9
29	37	55	Bayley Currey	JP Motorsports	Toyota	190	0	running	0
30	40	8	Angela Ruch	B. J. McLeod Motorsports	Chevrolet	188	0	running	7
31	39	74	Mike Harmon	Mike Harmon Racing	Chevrolet	182	0	running	6
32	28	0	Garrett Smithley	JD Motorsports	Chevrolet	176	0	crash	5
33	30	90	Donald Theetge	DGM Racing	Chevrolet	172	0	running	4
34	33	45	Josh Bilicki	JP Motorsports	Toyota	165	0	ignition	3
35	26	15	B. J. McLeod	JD Motorsports	Chevrolet	130	0	engine	2
36	23	38	J. J. Yeley	RSS Racing	Chevrolet	113	0	brakes	1
37	38	66	Carl Long	MBM Motorsports	Chevrolet	62	0	brakes	1
38	32	13	Timmy Hill	MBM Motorsports	Toyota	57	0	vibration	1
39	36	89	Morgan Shepherd	Shepherd Racing Ventures	Chevrolet	32	0	brakes	1
40	31	93	Jeff Green	RSS Racing	Chevrolet	22	0	brakes	1
Official race results

Previous race: 2018 Alsco 300 (Kentucky)	NASCAR Xfinity Series; 2018 season	Next race: 2018 U.S. Cellular 250
