= 2018 Pocono Green 250 =

12th race of the 2018 NASCAR Xfinity Series

2018 Pocono Green 250 Recycled by J. P. Mascaro & Sons
Race details
- Race 12 of 33 of the 2018 NASCAR Xfinity Series
- Date: June 2, 2018
- Official name: 3rd Annual Pocono Green 250 Recycled by J. P. Mascaro & Sons
- Location: Long Pond, Pennsylvania, Pocono Raceway
- Course: Permanent racing facility
- Course length: 2.5 miles (4.0 km)
- Distance: 100 laps, 250 mi (402.336 km)
- Scheduled distance: 100 laps, 250 mi (402.336 km)
- Average speed: 127.137 miles per hour (204.607 km/h)

Pole position
Driver	Cole Custer	Stewart-Haas Racing with Biagi-DenBeste
- Time: 55.754

Most laps led
Driver	Kyle Busch	Joe Gibbs Racing
- Laps: 64

Winner
No. 18	Kyle Busch	Joe Gibbs Racing

Television in the United States
- Network: Fox Sports 1
- Announcers: Adam Alexander, Michael Waltrip, Jamie McMurray

Radio in the United States
- Radio: Motor Racing Network

The 2018 Pocono Green 250 Recycled by J. P. Mascaro & Sons was the 12th stock car race of the 2018 NASCAR Xfinity Series season and the third iteration of the event. The race was held on Saturday, June 2, 2018 in Long Pond, Pennsylvania, at Pocono Raceway, a 2.5 miles (4.0 km) triangular permanent course. The race took the scheduled 100 laps to complete. At race's end, Kyle Busch of Joe Gibbs Racing would dominate and win his 92nd career NASCAR Xfinity Series win and his first of the season. To fill out the podium, Chase Elliott of GMS Racing and Daniel Hemric of Richard Childress Racing would finish second and third, respectively.

== Background ==
The layout of Pocono Raceway, the venue where the race was held.

The race was held at Pocono Raceway, which is a three-turn superspeedway located in Long Pond, Pennsylvania. The track hosts two annual NASCAR Sprint Cup Series races, as well as one Xfinity Series and Camping World Truck Series event. Until 2019, the track also hosted an IndyCar Series race.

Pocono Raceway is one of a very few NASCAR tracks not owned by either Speedway Motorsports, Inc. or International Speedway Corporation. It is operated by the Igdalsky siblings Brandon, Nicholas, and sister Ashley, and cousins Joseph IV and Chase Mattioli, all of whom are third-generation members of the family-owned Mattco Inc, started by Joseph II and Rose Mattioli.

Outside of the NASCAR races, the track is used throughout the year by Sports Car Club of America (SCCA) and motorcycle clubs as well as racing schools and an IndyCar race. The triangular oval also has three separate infield sections of racetrack – North Course, East Course and South Course. Each of these infield sections use a separate portion of the tri-oval to complete the track. During regular non-race weekends, multiple clubs can use the track by running on different infield sections. Also some of the infield sections can be run in either direction, or multiple infield sections can be put together – such as running the North Course and the South Course and using the tri-oval to connect the two.

=== Entry list ===
#	Driver	Team	Make	Sponsor
0	Garrett Smithley	JD Motorsports	Chevrolet	JD Motorsports
00	Cole Custer	Stewart-Haas Racing with Biagi-DenBeste	Ford	Haas Automation
1	Elliott Sadler	JR Motorsports	Chevrolet	OneMain Financial "Lending Done Human"
01	Vinnie Miller	JD Motorsports	Chevrolet	JAS Expedited Trucking
2	Matt Tifft	Richard Childress Racing	Chevrolet	Tunity "Hear Any Muted TV"
3	Shane Lee	Richard Childress Racing	Chevrolet	Childress Vineyards
4	Ross Chastain	JD Motorsports	Chevrolet	Flex Seal
5	Michael Annett	JR Motorsports	Chevrolet	Pilot Flying J
7	Justin Allgaier	JR Motorsports	Chevrolet	Breyers 2 in 1
8	Tommy Joe Martins	B. J. McLeod Motorsports	Chevrolet	B. J. McLeod Motorsports
9	Tyler Reddick	JR Motorsports	Chevrolet	Pinnacle
11	Ryan Truex	Kaulig Racing	Chevrolet	Phantom Fireworks
12	Austin Cindric	Team Penske	Ford	Fitzgerald Glider Kits
15	Matt Mills	JD Motorsports	Chevrolet	Flex Tape
16	Ryan Reed	Roush Fenway Racing	Ford	DriveDownA1C.com
18	Kyle Busch	Joe Gibbs Racing	Toyota	Comcast, NBCUniversal Salute to Service
19	Brandon Jones	Joe Gibbs Racing	Toyota	XYO Network
20	Christopher Bell	Joe Gibbs Racing	Toyota	Ruud
21	Daniel Hemric	Richard Childress Racing	Chevrolet	South Point Hotel, Casino & Spa
22	Paul Menard	Team Penske	Ford	LTi Printing
23	Chase Elliott	GMS Racing	Chevrolet	Allegiant Air
28	Dylan Lupton	JGL Racing	Ford	Fatal Clothing
35	Joey Gase	Go Green Racing with SS-Green Light Racing	Chevrolet	Sparks Energy
36	Alex Labbé	DGM Racing	Chevrolet	Wholey's, Can-Am
38	Jeff Green	RSS Racing	Chevrolet	RSS Racing
39	Ryan Sieg	RSS Racing	Chevrolet	KMB Plumbing & Electrical
40	Chad Finchum	MBM Motorsports	Toyota	Smithbilt Homes
42	John Hunter Nemechek	Chip Ganassi Racing	Chevrolet	Chevrolet Accessories
45	Josh Bilicki	JP Motorsports	Toyota	Prevagen
51	Jeremy Clements	Jeremy Clements Racing	Chevrolet	RepairableVehicles.com
52	David Starr	Jimmy Means Racing	Chevrolet	George's Tool Rental
55	Brandon Hightower	JP Motorsports	Toyota	Timmons Truck Center, Premier Recycling, LLC
60	Chase Briscoe	Roush Fenway Racing	Ford	NutriChomps
61	Kaz Grala	Fury Race Cars	Ford	Nettts
66	Timmy Hill	MBM Motorsports	Dodge	MBM Motorsports
74	Mike Harmon	Mike Harmon Racing	Chevrolet	Shadow Warriors Project, Horizon Transport
76	Spencer Boyd	SS-Green Light Racing	Chevrolet	Grunt Style "This We'll Defend"
78	B. J. McLeod	B. J. McLeod Motorsports	Chevrolet	B. J. McLeod Motorsports
89	Morgan Shepherd	Shepherd Racing Ventures	Chevrolet	Visone RV
90	Josh Williams	DGM Racing	Chevrolet	Bethel Glass & Shower Door, Sleep Well Sleep Disorder Specialists
93	J. J. Yeley	RSS Racing	Chevrolet	RSS Racing
Official entry list

== Practice ==
=== First practice ===
The first 50-minute practice session would occur on Friday, June 1, at 1:05 p.m. EST. Kyle Busch of Joe Gibbs Racing would set the fastest time in the session, with a time of 56.425 and an average speed of 159.504 miles per hour (256.697 km/h).

Pos.	#	Driver	Team	Make	Time	Speed
1	18	Kyle Busch	Joe Gibbs Racing	Toyota	56.425	159.504
2	20	Christopher Bell	Joe Gibbs Racing	Toyota	56.665	158.828
3	19	Brandon Jones	Joe Gibbs Racing	Toyota	56.717	158.683
Full first practice results

=== Second and final practice ===
The last 50-minute practice session, sometimes referred to as Happy Hour, would occur on Friday, June 1, at 3:05 p.m. EST. Kyle Busch of Joe Gibbs Racing would set the fastest time in the session, with a time of 56.424 and an average speed of 159.507 miles per hour (256.702 km/h).

Pos.	#	Driver	Team	Make	Time	Speed
1	18	Kyle Busch	Joe Gibbs Racing	Toyota	56.424	159.507
2	23	Chase Elliott	GMS Racing	Chevrolet	56.515	159.250
3	12	Austin Cindric	Team Penske	Ford	56.573	159.086
Full Happy Hour practice results

== Qualifying ==
Qualifying was held on Saturday, June 2, at 9:35 a.m. EST. Since Pocono Raceway is at least 2 miles (3.2 km), the qualifying system was a single car, single lap, two round system where in the first round, everyone would set a time to determine positions 13-40. Then, the fastest 12 qualifiers would move on to the second round to determine positions 1-12.

Cole Custer of Stewart-Haas Racing with Biagi-DenBeste would win the pole, setting a time of 55.754 and an average speed of 161.423 miles per hour (259.785 km/h) in the second round.

One driver would fail to qualify: Morgan Shepherd.

=== Full qualifying results ===
Pos.	#	Driver	Team	Make	Time (R1)	Speed (R1)	Time (R2)	Speed (R2)
1	00	Cole Custer	Stewart-Haas Racing with Biagi-DenBeste	Ford	56.276	159.926	55.754	161.423
2	11	Ryan Truex	Kaulig Racing	Chevrolet	56.391	159.600	55.790	161.319
3	12	Austin Cindric	Team Penske	Ford	56.024	160.645	55.827	161.212
4	18	Kyle Busch	Joe Gibbs Racing	Toyota	56.604	158.999	55.850	161.146
5	20	Christopher Bell	Joe Gibbs Racing	Toyota	56.264	159.960	55.864	161.106
6	19	Brandon Jones	Joe Gibbs Racing	Toyota	56.509	159.267	55.972	160.795
7	1	Elliott Sadler	JR Motorsports	Chevrolet	56.592	159.033	56.003	160.706
8	42	John Hunter Nemechek	Chip Ganassi Racing	Chevrolet	56.644	158.887	56.045	160.585
9	9	Tyler Reddick	JR Motorsports	Chevrolet	56.708	158.708	56.233	160.048
10	23	Chase Elliott	GMS Racing	Chevrolet	56.805	158.437	56.250	160.000
11	21	Daniel Hemric	Richard Childress Racing	Chevrolet	56.754	158.579	56.390	159.603
12	4	Ross Chastain	JD Motorsports	Chevrolet	56.683	158.778	56.550	159.151
Eliminated in Round 1
13	22	Paul Menard	Team Penske	Ford	56.827	158.375	—	—
14	51	Jeremy Clements	Jeremy Clements Racing	Chevrolet	56.893	158.192	—	—
15	61	Kaz Grala	Fury Race Cars	Ford	56.901	158.169	—	—
16	60	Chase Briscoe	Roush Fenway Racing	Ford	56.975	157.964	—	—
17	39	Ryan Sieg	RSS Racing	Chevrolet	57.075	157.687	—	—
18	3	Shane Lee	Richard Childress Racing	Chevrolet	57.102	157.613	—	—
19	7	Justin Allgaier	JR Motorsports	Chevrolet	57.141	157.505	—	—
20	16	Ryan Reed	Roush Fenway Racing	Ford	57.416	156.751	—	—
21	2	Matt Tifft	Richard Childress Racing	Chevrolet	57.511	156.492	—	—
22	5	Michael Annett	JR Motorsports	Chevrolet	57.578	156.310	—	—
23	36	Alex Labbé	DGM Racing	Chevrolet	57.786	155.747	—	—
24	35	Joey Gase	Go Green Racing with SS-Green Light Racing	Chevrolet	57.998	155.178	—	—
25	38	J. J. Yeley	RSS Racing	Chevrolet	58.063	155.004	—	—
26	28	Dylan Lupton	JGL Racing	Ford	58.149	154.775	—	—
27	8	Tommy Joe Martins	B. J. McLeod Motorsports	Chevrolet	58.350	154.242	—	—
28	78	B. J. McLeod	B. J. McLeod Motorsports	Chevrolet	58.533	153.759	—	—
29	52	David Starr	Jimmy Means Racing	Chevrolet	58.910	152.775	—	—
30	01	Vinnie Miller	JD Motorsports	Chevrolet	59.200	152.027	—	—
31	15	Matt Mills	JD Motorsports	Chevrolet	59.228	151.955	—	—
32	90	Josh Williams	DGM Racing	Chevrolet	59.229	151.953	—	—
33	93	Jeff Green	RSS Racing	Chevrolet	59.244	151.914	—	—
Qualified by owner's points
34	66	Timmy Hill	MBM Motorsports	Dodge	59.552	151.128	—	—
35	40	Chad Finchum	MBM Motorsports	Toyota	59.791	150.524	—	—
36	76	Spencer Boyd	SS-Green Light Racing	Chevrolet	59.853	150.368	—	—
37	0	Garrett Smithley	JD Motorsports	Chevrolet	59.981	150.048	—	—
38	55	Brandon Hightower	JP Motorsports	Toyota	1:00.426	148.943	—	—
39	45	Josh Bilicki	JP Motorsports	Toyota	1:00.715	148.234	—	—
40	74	Mike Harmon	Mike Harmon Racing	Chevrolet	1:00.898	147.788	—	—
Failed to qualify
41	89	Morgan Shepherd	Shepherd Racing Ventures	Chevrolet	59.934	150.165	—	—
Official qualifying results
Official starting lineup

== Race results ==
Stage 1 Laps: 25

Pos.	#	Driver	Team	Make	Pts
1	18	Kyle Busch	Joe Gibbs Racing	Toyota	0
2	20	Christopher Bell	Joe Gibbs Racing	Toyota	9
3	12	Austin Cindric	Team Penske	Ford	8
4	1	Elliott Sadler	JR Motorsports	Chevrolet	7
5	19	Brandon Jones	Joe Gibbs Racing	Toyota	6
6	42	John Hunter Nemechek	Chip Ganassi Racing	Chevrolet	5
7	23	Chase Elliott	GMS Racing	Chevrolet	0
8	22	Paul Menard	Team Penske	Ford	0
9	9	Tyler Reddick	JR Motorsports	Chevrolet	2
10	21	Daniel Hemric	Richard Childress Racing	Chevrolet	1

Stage 2 Laps: 25

Pos.	#	Driver	Team	Make	Pts
1	22	Paul Menard	Team Penske	Ford	0
2	00	Cole Custer	Stewart-Haas Racing with Biagi-DenBeste	Ford	9
3	7	Justin Allgaier	JR Motorsports	Chevrolet	8
4	12	Austin Cindric	Team Penske	Ford	7
5	42	John Hunter Nemechek	Chip Ganassi Racing	Chevrolet	6
6	18	Kyle Busch	Joe Gibbs Racing	Toyota	0
7	23	Chase Elliott	GMS Racing	Chevrolet	0
8	1	Elliott Sadler	JR Motorsports	Chevrolet	3
9	9	Tyler Reddick	JR Motorsports	Chevrolet	2
10	11	Ryan Truex	Kaulig Racing	Chevrolet	1

Stage 3 Laps: 50

Pos.	St	#	Driver	Team	Make	Laps	Led	Status	Pts
1	4	18	Kyle Busch	Joe Gibbs Racing	Toyota	100	64	running	0
2	10	23	Chase Elliott	GMS Racing	Chevrolet	100	0	running	0
3	11	21	Daniel Hemric	Richard Childress Racing	Chevrolet	100	0	running	35
4	3	12	Austin Cindric	Team Penske	Ford	100	1	running	48
5	1	00	Cole Custer	Stewart-Haas Racing with Biagi-DenBeste	Ford	100	23	running	41
6	7	1	Elliott Sadler	JR Motorsports	Chevrolet	100	0	running	41
7	8	42	John Hunter Nemechek	Chip Ganassi Racing	Chevrolet	100	4	running	41
8	13	22	Paul Menard	Team Penske	Ford	100	3	running	0
9	9	9	Tyler Reddick	JR Motorsports	Chevrolet	100	0	running	32
10	2	11	Ryan Truex	Kaulig Racing	Chevrolet	100	0	running	28
11	12	4	Ross Chastain	JD Motorsports	Chevrolet	100	0	running	26
12	18	3	Shane Lee	Richard Childress Racing	Chevrolet	100	0	running	25
13	20	16	Ryan Reed	Roush Fenway Racing	Ford	100	0	running	24
14	21	2	Matt Tifft	Richard Childress Racing	Chevrolet	100	0	running	23
15	14	51	Jeremy Clements	Jeremy Clements Racing	Chevrolet	100	0	running	22
16	15	61	Kaz Grala	Fury Race Cars	Ford	100	0	running	21
17	17	39	Ryan Sieg	RSS Racing	Chevrolet	100	0	running	20
18	23	36	Alex Labbé	DGM Racing	Chevrolet	100	0	running	19
19	24	35	Joey Gase	Go Green Racing with SS-Green Light Racing	Chevrolet	100	0	running	18
20	29	52	David Starr	Jimmy Means Racing	Chevrolet	99	0	running	17
21	32	90	Josh Williams	DGM Racing	Chevrolet	99	0	running	16
22	28	78	B. J. McLeod	B. J. McLeod Motorsports	Chevrolet	99	0	running	15
23	26	28	Dylan Lupton	JGL Racing	Ford	99	0	running	14
24	6	19	Brandon Jones	Joe Gibbs Racing	Toyota	99	5	running	19
25	27	8	Tommy Joe Martins	B. J. McLeod Motorsports	Chevrolet	99	0	running	12
26	37	0	Garrett Smithley	JD Motorsports	Chevrolet	98	0	running	11
27	31	15	Matt Mills	JD Motorsports	Chevrolet	98	0	running	10
28	36	76	Spencer Boyd	SS-Green Light Racing	Chevrolet	97	0	running	9
29	39	45	Josh Bilicki	JP Motorsports	Toyota	96	0	running	8
30	35	40	Chad Finchum	MBM Motorsports	Toyota	96	0	running	7
31	30	01	Vinnie Miller	JD Motorsports	Chevrolet	96	0	running	6
32	38	55	Brandon Hightower	JP Motorsports	Toyota	95	0	running	5
33	40	74	Mike Harmon	Mike Harmon Racing	Chevrolet	93	0	running	4
34	25	38	J. J. Yeley	RSS Racing	Chevrolet	68	0	brakes	3
35	22	5	Michael Annett	JR Motorsports	Chevrolet	66	0	suspension	2
36	5	20	Christopher Bell	Joe Gibbs Racing	Toyota	61	0	crash	10
37	19	7	Justin Allgaier	JR Motorsports	Chevrolet	60	0	crash	9
38	16	60	Chase Briscoe	Roush Fenway Racing	Ford	57	0	crash	1
39	34	66	Timmy Hill	MBM Motorsports	Dodge	10	0	overheating	1
40	33	93	Jeff Green	RSS Racing	Chevrolet	4	0	brakes	1
Failed to qualify
41		89	Morgan Shepherd	Shepherd Racing Ventures	Chevrolet				
Official race results

Previous race: 2018 Alsco 300 (Charlotte)	NASCAR Xfinity Series; 2018 season	Next race: 2018 LTi Printing 250
