= 2018 Rock N Roll Tequila 170 =

21st race of the 2018 NASCAR Xfinity Series

Race details
- Race 21 of 33 of the 2018 NASCAR Xfinity Series
- Date: August 11, 2018
- Official name: 6th Annual Rock N Roll Tequila 170
- Location: Lexington, Ohio, Mid-Ohio Sports Car Course
- Course: Permanent racing facility
- Course length: 2.258 miles (3.634 km)
- Distance: 75 laps, 169.35 mi (272.542 km)
- Scheduled distance: 75 laps, 169.35 mi (272.542 km)
- Average speed: 73.312 miles per hour (117.984 km/h)

Pole position
Driver	Austin Cindric	Team Penske
- Time: 1:23.972

Most laps led
Driver	Austin Cindric	Team Penske
- Laps: 59

Winner
No. 7	Justin Allgaier	JR Motorsports

Television in the United States
- Network: NBCSN
- Announcers: Dave Burns, Dale Jarrett

Radio in the United States
- Radio: Motor Racing Network

The 2018 Rock N Roll Tequila 170 presented by Amethyst Beverage was the 21st stock car race of the 2018 NASCAR Xfinity Series season, and the sixth iteration of the event. The race was held on Saturday, August 11, 2018, in Lexington, Ohio at the Mid-Ohio Sports Car Course, a 2.258 miles (3.634 km) permanent road course. The race took the scheduled 75 laps to complete. At race's end, Justin Allgaier of JR Motorsports would pass a dominating Austin Cindric from Team Penske with new tires to win his eighth career NASCAR Xfinity Series win and his third of the season. To fill out the podium, Daniel Hemric of Richard Childress Racing would finish third.

== Background ==
The track is a road course auto racing facility located in Troy Township, Morrow County, Ohio, United States, just outside the village of Lexington. Mid-Ohio has also colloquially become a term for the entire north-central region of the state, from south of Sandusky to the north of Columbus.

The track opened as a 15-turn, 2.4 mile (3.86 km) road circuit run clockwise. The back portion of the track allows speeds approaching 180 mph (290 km/h). A separate starting line is located on the backstretch to allow for safer rolling starts. The regular start / finish line is located on the pit straight. There is grandstand seating for 10,000 spectators and three observation mounds alongside the track raise the capacity to over 75,000.

=== Entry list ===
#	Driver	Team	Make	Sponsor
0	Garrett Smithley	JD Motorsports	Chevrolet	Wheeling Nailers
00	Cole Custer	Stewart-Haas Racing with Biagi-DenBeste	Ford	Haas Automation
1	Elliott Sadler	JR Motorsports	Chevrolet	Hunt Brothers Pizza
01	Vinnie Miller	JD Motorsports	Chevrolet	JAS Expedited Trucking
2	Matt Tifft	Richard Childress Racing	Chevrolet	Cleveland Indians, Fanatics
3	Brendan Gaughan	Richard Childress Racing	Chevrolet	South Point Hotel, Casino & Spa, Beard Oil Distributing
4	Ross Chastain	JD Motorsports	Chevrolet	SEM
5	Michael Annett	JR Motorsports	Chevrolet	Allstate Parts & Service
7	Justin Allgaier	JR Motorsports	Chevrolet	Brandt Professional Agriculture
8	Cody Ware	B. J. McLeod Motorsports	Chevrolet	B. J. McLeod Motorsports
9	Tyler Reddick	JR Motorsports	Chevrolet	Nationwide Children's Hospital
11	Ryan Truex	Kaulig Racing	Chevrolet	LeafFilter Gutter Protection
13	John Jackson	MBM Motorsports	Dodge	CrashClaimsR.Us
15	Katherine Legge	JD Motorsports	Chevrolet	Airtec
16	Ryan Reed	Roush Fenway Racing	Ford	DriveDownA1C.com
18	Kyle Benjamin	Joe Gibbs Racing	Toyota	Mobil 1, Toyota Service Centers
19	Brandon Jones	Joe Gibbs Racing	Toyota	Menards, Atlas Designer Shingles
20	Christopher Bell	Joe Gibbs Racing	Toyota	Rheem
21	Daniel Hemric	Richard Childress Racing	Chevrolet	South Point Hotel, Casino & Spa
22	Austin Cindric	Team Penske	Ford	PPG
23	Spencer Gallagher	GMS Racing	Chevrolet	Allegiant Air
35	Joey Gase	Go Green Racing with SS-Green Light Racing	Chevrolet	Sparks Energy
36	Alex Labbé	DGM Racing	Chevrolet	La Rue Industrial Snowblowers
38	J. J. Yeley	RSS Racing	Chevrolet	RSS Racing
39	Ryan Sieg	RSS Racing	Chevrolet	Midstate Basement Authorities
40	Chad Finchum	MBM Motorsports	Toyota	Smithbilt Homes
42	Justin Marks	Chip Ganassi Racing	Chevrolet	Chevrolet Accessories
45	Josh Bilicki	JP Motorsports	Toyota	Prevagen
51	Jeremy Clements	Jeremy Clements Racing	Chevrolet	BRT Extrustions
52	David Starr	Jimmy Means Racing	Chevrolet	Extreme Kleaner
55	Dylan Murcott	JP Motorsports	Toyota	Prevagen
60	Chase Briscoe	Roush Fenway Racing	Ford	Ford
61	Kaz Grala	Fury Race Cars	Ford	DMB Financial
66	Tim Cowen	MBM Motorsports	Ford	Cowen Logistics
74	Stephen Leicht	Mike Harmon Racing	Dodge	Shadow Warriors Project, Horizon Transport
76	Spencer Boyd	SS-Green Light Racing	Chevrolet	Grunt Style "This We'll Defend"
78	Tommy Joe Martins	B. J. McLeod Motorsports	Chevrolet	B. J. McLeod Motorsports
89	Morgan Shepherd	Shepherd Racing Ventures	Chevrolet	Visone RV
90	Andy Lally	DGM Racing	Chevrolet	Amethyst Beverage, Aase Sales
93	Jeff Green	RSS Racing	Chevrolet	RSS Racing
Official entry list

== Practice ==
=== First practice ===
The first practice session would occur on Friday, August 10, at 1:35 PM EST and would last for one hour and 20 minutes. Ryan Reed of Roush Fenway Racing would set the fastest time in the session, with a lap of 1:25.829 and an average speed of 94.709 miles per hour (152.419 km/h).

Pos.	#	Driver	Team	Make	Time	Speed
1	16	Ryan Reed	Roush Fenway Racing	Ford	1:25.829	94.709
2	90	Andy Lally	DGM Racing	Chevrolet	1:26.020	94.499
3	18	Kyle Benjamin	Joe Gibbs Racing	Toyota	1:26.137	94.371
Full first practice results

=== Second and final practice ===
The second and final practice session, sometimes referred to as Happy Hour, would occur on Friday, August 10, at 4:05 PM EST and would last for 50 minutes. As rain would hinder the session, only five cars would make a lap. Brendan Gaughan of Richard Childress Racing would set the fastest time in the session, with a lap of 1:32.649 and an average speed of 87.738 miles per hour (141.201 km/h).

Pos.	#	Driver	Team	Make	Time	Speed
1	3	Brendan Gaughan	Richard Childress Racing	Chevrolet	1:32.649	87.738
2	42	Justin Marks	Chip Ganassi Racing	Chevrolet	1:33.790	86.670
3	20	Christopher Bell	Joe Gibbs Racing	Toyota	1:34.371	86.137
Full Happy Hour practice results

== Qualifying ==
Qualifying was held on Saturday, August 11, at 11:30 AM EST. Since the Mid-Ohio Sports Car Course is a road course, the qualifying system was a multi-car system that included two rounds. The first round was 25 minutes, where every driver would be able to set a lap within the 25 minutes. Then, the second round would consist of the fastest 12 cars in Round 1, and drivers would have 10 minutes to set a lap. Whoever set the fastest time in Round 2 would win the pole.

Austin Cindric of Team Penske would win the pole, setting a time of 1:24.336 and an average speed of 96.386 miles per hour (155.118 km/h) in the second round.

No drivers would fail to qualify.

=== Full qualifying results ===
Pos.	#	Driver	Team	Make	Time (R1)	Speed (R1)	Time (R2)	Speed (R2)
1	22	Austin Cindric	Team Penske	Ford	1:23.972	96.804	1:24.336	96.386
2	1	Elliott Sadler	JR Motorsports	Chevrolet	1:25.002	95.631	1:24.859	95.792
3	19	Brandon Jones	Joe Gibbs Racing	Toyota	1:24.912	95.732	1:24.905	95.740
4	00	Cole Custer	Stewart-Haas Racing with Biagi-DenBeste	Ford	1:24.672	96.003	1:25.033	95.596
5	2	Matt Tifft	Richard Childress Racing	Chevrolet	1:25.118	95.500	1:25.075	95.549
6	11	Ryan Truex	Kaulig Racing	Chevrolet	1:25.311	95.284	1:25.301	95.295
7	7	Justin Allgaier	JR Motorsports	Chevrolet	1:24.985	95.650	1:25.324	95.270
8	90	Andy Lally	DGM Racing	Chevrolet	1:25.327	95.266	1:25.341	95.251
9	21	Daniel Hemric	Richard Childress Racing	Chevrolet	1:25.219	95.387	1:25.406	95.178
10	20	Christopher Bell	Joe Gibbs Racing	Toyota	1:25.170	95.442	1:25.408	95.176
11	16	Ryan Reed	Roush Fenway Racing	Ford	1:25.384	95.203	1:25.513	95.059
12	18	Kyle Benjamin	Joe Gibbs Racing	Toyota	1:25.297	95.300	1:25.704	94.847
Eliminated in Round 1
13	36	Alex Labbé	DGM Racing	Chevrolet	1:25.388	95.198	—	—
14	4	Ross Chastain	JD Motorsports	Chevrolet	1:25.514	95.058	—	—
15	9	Tyler Reddick	JR Motorsports	Chevrolet	1:25.546	95.023	—	—
16	3	Brendan Gaughan	Richard Childress Racing	Chevrolet	1:25.697	94.855	—	—
17	51	Jeremy Clements	Jeremy Clements Racing	Chevrolet	1:25.703	94.848	—	—
18	60	Chase Briscoe	Roush Fenway Racing	Ford	1:25.768	94.777	—	—
19	61	Kaz Grala	Fury Race Cars	Ford	1:25.808	94.732	—	—
20	23	Spencer Gallagher	GMS Racing	Chevrolet	1:26.017	94.502	—	—
21	39	Ryan Sieg	RSS Racing	Chevrolet	1:26.246	94.251	—	—
22	15	Katherine Legge	JD Motorsports	Chevrolet	1:26.261	94.235	—	—
23	42	Justin Marks	Chip Ganassi Racing	Chevrolet	1:26.382	94.103	—	—
24	5	Michael Annett	JR Motorsports	Chevrolet	1:26.565	93.904	—	—
25	38	J. J. Yeley	RSS Racing	Chevrolet	1:26.581	93.887	—	—
26	8	Cody Ware	B. J. McLeod Motorsports	Chevrolet	1:27.617	92.777	—	—
27	35	Joey Gase	Go Green Racing with SS-Green Light Racing	Chevrolet	1:27.818	92.564	—	—
28	45	Josh Bilicki	JP Motorsports	Toyota	1:28.252	92.109	—	—
29	93	Jeff Green	RSS Racing	Chevrolet	1:28.478	91.874	—	—
30	78	Tommy Joe Martins	B. J. McLeod Motorsports	Chevrolet	1:28.767	91.575	—	—
31	0	Garrett Smithley	JD Motorsports	Chevrolet	1:28.769	91.573	—	—
32	52	David Starr	Jimmy Means Racing	Chevrolet	1:28.861	91.478	—	—
33	66	Tim Cowen	MBM Motorsports	Ford	1:29.154	91.177	—	—
Qualified by owner's points
34	55	Dylan Murcott	JP Motorsports	Toyota	1:29.498	90.827	—	—
35	76	Spencer Boyd	SS-Green Light Racing	Chevrolet	1:30.451	89.870	—	—
36	40	Chad Finchum	MBM Motorsports	Toyota	1:31.085	89.244	—	—
37	74	Stephen Leicht	Mike Harmon Racing	Dodge	1:31.118	89.212	—	—
38	01	Vinnie Miller	JD Motorsports	Chevrolet	1:32.338	88.033	—	—
39	13	John Jackson	MBM Motorsports	Dodge	1:34.152	86.337	—	—
40	89	Morgan Shepherd	Shepherd Racing Ventures	Chevrolet	1:40.582	80.818	—	—
Official qualifying results
Official starting lineup

== Race results ==
Stage 1 Laps: 20

Pos.	#	Driver	Team	Make	Pts
1	7	Justin Allgaier	JR Motorsports	Chevrolet	10
2	1	Elliott Sadler	JR Motorsports	Chevrolet	9
3	11	Ryan Truex	Kaulig Racing	Chevrolet	8
4	4	Ross Chastain	JD Motorsports	Chevrolet	7
5	22	Austin Cindric	Team Penske	Ford	6
6	61	Kaz Grala	Fury Race Cars	Ford	5
7	23	Spencer Gallagher	GMS Racing	Chevrolet	4
8	15	Katherine Legge	JD Motorsports	Chevrolet	3
9	60	Chase Briscoe	Roush Fenway Racing	Ford	2
10	2	Matt Tifft	Richard Childress Racing	Chevrolet	1

Stage 2 Laps: 20

Pos.	#	Driver	Team	Make	Pts
1	22	Austin Cindric	Team Penske	Ford	10
2	2	Matt Tifft	Richard Childress Racing	Chevrolet	9
3	20	Christopher Bell	Joe Gibbs Racing	Toyota	8
4	00	Cole Custer	Stewart-Haas Racing with Biagi-DenBeste	Ford	7
5	21	Daniel Hemric	Richard Childress Racing	Chevrolet	6
6	9	Tyler Reddick	JR Motorsports	Chevrolet	5
7	51	Jeremy Clements	Jeremy Clements Racing	Chevrolet	4
8	1	Elliott Sadler	JR Motorsports	Chevrolet	3
9	3	Brendan Gaughan	Richard Childress Racing	Chevrolet	0
10	7	Justin Allgaier	JR Motorsports	Chevrolet	1

Stage 3 Laps: 35

Fin	St	#	Driver	Team	Make	Laps	Led	Status	Pts
1	7	7	Justin Allgaier	JR Motorsports	Chevrolet	75	8	running	51
2	1	22	Austin Cindric	Team Penske	Ford	75	59	running	51
3	9	21	Daniel Hemric	Richard Childress Racing	Chevrolet	75	0	running	40
4	5	2	Matt Tifft	Richard Childress Racing	Chevrolet	75	0	running	43
5	6	11	Ryan Truex	Kaulig Racing	Chevrolet	75	0	running	40
6	2	1	Elliott Sadler	JR Motorsports	Chevrolet	75	0	running	43
7	4	00	Cole Custer	Stewart-Haas Racing with Biagi-DenBeste	Ford	75	0	running	37
8	20	23	Spencer Gallagher	GMS Racing	Chevrolet	75	0	running	33
9	13	36	Alex Labbé	DGM Racing	Chevrolet	75	0	running	28
10	11	16	Ryan Reed	Roush Fenway Racing	Ford	75	0	running	27
11	10	20	Christopher Bell	Joe Gibbs Racing	Toyota	75	1	running	34
12	16	3	Brendan Gaughan	Richard Childress Racing	Chevrolet	75	0	running	0
13	12	18	Kyle Benjamin	Joe Gibbs Racing	Toyota	75	0	running	24
14	18	60	Chase Briscoe	Roush Fenway Racing	Ford	75	0	running	25
15	8	90	Andy Lally	DGM Racing	Chevrolet	75	7	running	22
16	14	4	Ross Chastain	JD Motorsports	Chevrolet	75	0	running	28
17	17	51	Jeremy Clements	Jeremy Clements Racing	Chevrolet	75	0	running	24
18	24	5	Michael Annett	JR Motorsports	Chevrolet	75	0	running	19
19	30	78	Tommy Joe Martins	B. J. McLeod Motorsports	Chevrolet	75	0	running	18
20	28	45	Josh Bilicki	JP Motorsports	Toyota	75	0	running	17
21	32	52	David Starr	Jimmy Means Racing	Chevrolet	75	0	running	16
22	23	42	Justin Marks	Chip Ganassi Racing	Chevrolet	75	0	running	15
23	3	19	Brandon Jones	Joe Gibbs Racing	Toyota	75	0	running	14
24	27	35	Joey Gase	Go Green Racing with SS-Green Light Racing	Chevrolet	75	0	running	13
25	35	76	Spencer Boyd	SS-Green Light Racing	Chevrolet	75	0	running	12
26	33	66	Tim Cowen	MBM Motorsports	Ford	75	0	running	11
27	19	61	Kaz Grala	Fury Race Cars	Ford	75	0	running	15
28	31	0	Garrett Smithley	JD Motorsports	Chevrolet	75	0	running	9
29	36	40	Chad Finchum	MBM Motorsports	Toyota	75	0	running	8
30	22	15	Katherine Legge	JD Motorsports	Chevrolet	65	0	engine	10
31	15	9	Tyler Reddick	JR Motorsports	Chevrolet	60	0	crash	11
32	25	38	J. J. Yeley	RSS Racing	Chevrolet	48	0	rear gear	5
33	26	8	Cody Ware	B. J. McLeod Motorsports	Chevrolet	37	0	crash	0
34	21	39	Ryan Sieg	RSS Racing	Chevrolet	29	0	transmission	3
35	39	13	John Jackson	MBM Motorsports	Dodge	23	0	transmission	2
36	38	01	Vinnie Miller	JD Motorsports	Chevrolet	14	0	brakes	1
37	37	74	Stephen Leicht	Mike Harmon Racing	Dodge	11	0	clutch	1
38	40	89	Morgan Shepherd	Shepherd Racing Ventures	Chevrolet	9	0	overheating	1
39	29	93	Jeff Green	RSS Racing	Chevrolet	6	0	brakes	1
40	34	55	Dylan Murcott	JP Motorsports	Toyota	0	0	crash	1
Official race results

Previous race: 2018 Zippo 200 at The Glen	NASCAR Xfinity Series; 2018 season	Next race: 2018 Food City 300
