= 2018 Coca-Cola Firecracker 250 =

16th race of the 2018 NASCAR Xfinity Series

Race details
- Race 16 of 33 of the 2018 NASCAR Xfinity Series
- Date: July 6, 2018
- Official name: 17th Annual Coca-Cola Firecracker 250
- Location: Daytona Beach, Florida, Daytona International Speedway
- Course: Permanent racing facility
- Course length: 2.5 miles (4.0 km)
- Distance: 105 laps, 262.5 mi (422.452 km)
- Scheduled distance: 100 laps, 500 mi (402.336 km)
- Average speed: 129.541 miles per hour (208.476 km/h)

Pole position
Driver	Ryan Preece	Joe Gibbs Racing
- Time: Set by 2018 owner's points

Most laps led
Driver	Kyle Larson	Chip Ganassi Racing
- Laps: 40

Winner
No. 42	Kyle Larson	Chip Ganassi Racing

Television in the United States
- Network: NBCSN
- Announcers: Rick Allen, Jeff Burton, Steve Letarte, Dale Earnhardt Jr.

Radio in the United States
- Radio: Motor Racing Network

The 2018 Coca-Cola Firecracker 250 was the 16th stock car race of the 2018 NASCAR Xfinity Series season and the 17th iteration of the event. The race was held on Friday, July 6, 2018, in Daytona Beach, Florida at Daytona International Speedway, a 2.5 miles (4.0 km) permanent triangular-shaped superspeedway. The race was extended from its scheduled 100 laps to 105 due to a NASCAR overtime finish. At race's end, a close, but controversial finish would see Chip Ganassi Racing driver Kyle Larson win his 11th career NASCAR Xfinity Series win and his third of his part-time season. To fill out the podium, Elliott Sadler of JR Motorsports and Christopher Bell of Joe Gibbs Racing would finish second and third, respectively.

In a controversial ruling, GMS Racing driver Justin Haley, who had initially won the race was instead disqualified from his win due to him passing Larson below the yellow line, moving him to the last position on the lead lap, which was 18th.

== Background ==
The layout of Daytona International Speedway, the venue where the race was held.

Daytona International Speedway is one of three superspeedways to hold NASCAR races, the other two being Indianapolis Motor Speedway and Talladega Superspeedway. The standard track at Daytona International Speedway is a four-turn superspeedway that is 2.5 miles (4.0 km) long. The track's turns are banked at 31 degrees, while the front stretch, the location of the finish line, is banked at 18 degrees.

=== Entry list ===
#	Driver	Team	Make	Sponsor
0	Garrett Smithley	JD Motorsports	Chevrolet	Trophy Tractor, FAME USA
00	Cole Custer	Stewart-Haas Racing with Biagi-DenBeste	Ford	Haas Automation
1	Elliott Sadler	JR Motorsports	Chevrolet	Armour Chili
01	Vinnie Miller	JD Motorsports	Chevrolet	JAS Expedited Trucking
2	Matt Tifft	Richard Childress Racing	Chevrolet	KC Motorgroup
3	Shane Lee	Richard Childress Racing	Chevrolet	Childress Vineyards
4	Ross Chastain	JD Motorsports	Chevrolet	Georgia Watermelon Association
5	Michael Annett	JR Motorsports	Chevrolet	Pilot Flying J
7	Justin Allgaier	JR Motorsports	Chevrolet	Breyers 2-in-1
8	Caesar Bacarella	B. J. McLeod Motorsports	Chevrolet	Maxim, Alpha Prime Regimen
9	Tyler Reddick	JR Motorsports	Chevrolet	Takl
11	Ryan Truex	Kaulig Racing	Chevrolet	Phantom Fireworks
15	B. J. McLeod	JD Motorsports	Chevrolet	JD Motorsports
16	Ryan Reed	Roush Fenway Racing	Ford	DriveDownA1C.com Patriotic
18	Ryan Preece	Joe Gibbs Racing	Toyota	Rheem
19	Brandon Jones	Joe Gibbs Racing	Toyota	Comcast, NBCUniversal Salute to Service
20	Christopher Bell	Joe Gibbs Racing	Toyota	GameStop, PDP Gaming
21	Daniel Hemric	Richard Childress Racing	Chevrolet	South Point Hotel, Casino & Spa
22	Ryan Blaney	Team Penske	Ford	Pirtek
23	Chase Elliott	GMS Racing	Chevrolet	Untuckit
24	Justin Haley	GMS Racing	Chevrolet	Fraternal Order of Eagles Patriotic
35	Joey Gase	Go Green Racing with SS-Green Light Racing	Chevrolet	Sparks Energy, Donate Life Florida
36	Alex Labbé	DGM Racing	Chevrolet	Wholey's, Can-Am
38	J. J. Yeley	RSS Racing	Chevrolet	Superior Essex
39	Ryan Sieg	RSS Racing	Chevrolet	Ionomy, Offroad Heat
40	Chad Finchum	MBM Motorsports	Toyota	CrashClaimsR.Us, Amana
42	Kyle Larson	Chip Ganassi Racing	Chevrolet	DC Solar Patriotic
45	Josh Bilicki	JP Motorsports	Toyota	Prevagen Patriotic
51	Jeremy Clements	Jeremy Clements Racing	Chevrolet	RepairableVehicles.com Patriotic
52	David Starr	Jimmy Means Racing	Chevrolet	Starr Mechanical
55	Brandon Hightower	JP Motorsports	Toyota	Swamp Daddy's Crawfish
60	Austin Cindric	Roush Fenway Racing	Ford	Odyssey Battery
61	Kaz Grala	Fury Race Cars	Ford	Kiklos
66	Timmy Hill	MBM Motorsports	Toyota	VS1 Racing
74	Mike Harmon	Mike Harmon Racing	Chevrolet	Shadow Warriors Project, The Journey Home Project
76	Spencer Boyd	SS-Green Light Racing	Chevrolet	Grunt Style Patriotic "This We'll Defend"
78	Blake Jones	B. J. McLeod Motorsports	Chevrolet	Tennessee XXX Moonshine, True Line Construction
89	Morgan Shepherd*	Shepherd Racing Ventures	Chevrolet	Visone RV Motorhome Parts, Racing with Jesus
90	Josh Williams	DGM Racing	Chevrolet	Sleep Well Sleep Disorder Specialists, StarTron
93	Jeff Green	RSS Racing	Chevrolet	Night Owl Contractors
99	Ray Black Jr.	B. J. McLeod Motorsports	Toyota	America's Donuts, Zomongo
Official entry list

*Withdrew.

== Practice ==
=== First practice ===
The first practice session was held on Thursday, July 5, at 1:05 p.m. EST, and would last for 50 minutes. Ryan Reed of Roush Fenway Racing would set the fastest time in the session, with a lap of 45.885 and an average speed of 196.143 miles per hour (315.662 km/h).

Pos.	#	Driver	Team	Make	Time	Speed
1	16	Ryan Reed	Roush Fenway Racing	Ford	45.885	196.143
2	24	Justin Haley	GMS Racing	Chevrolet	45.949	195.869
3	11	Ryan Truex	Kaulig Racing	Chevrolet	45.958	195.831
Full first practice results

=== Second practice ===
The second and final practice session, sometimes referred to as Happy Hour, was held on Thursday, July 5, at 3:05 p.m. EST, and would last for 50 minutes. Chad Finchum of MBM Motorsports would set the fastest time in the session, with a lap of 48.500 and an average speed of 185.567 miles per hour (298.641 km/h).

Pos.	#	Driver	Team	Make	Time	Speed
1	40	Chad Finchum	MBM Motorsports	Toyota	48.500	185.567
2	66	Timmy Hill	MBM Motorsports	Toyota	48.507	185.540
3	51	Jeremy Clements	Jeremy Clements Racing	Chevrolet	48.676	184.896
Full Happy Hour practice results

== Starting lineup ==
Qualifying was originally going to be held on Friday, July 6, at 2:10 p.m. EST. However, rain would cancel the qualifying session, forcing NASCAR to resort to the rulebook to set up the lineup, using the current 2018 owner's points. As a result, Ryan Preece of Joe Gibbs Racing won the pole.

=== Full starting lineup ===
Pos.	#	Driver	Team	Make
1	18	Ryan Preece	Joe Gibbs Racing	Toyota
2	22	Ryan Blaney	Team Penske	Ford
3	00	Cole Custer	Stewart-Haas Racing with Biagi-DenBeste	Ford
4	21	Daniel Hemric	Richard Childress Racing	Chevrolet
5	1	Elliott Sadler	JR Motorsports	Chevrolet
6	20	Christopher Bell	Joe Gibbs Racing	Toyota
7	42	Kyle Larson	Chip Ganassi Racing	Chevrolet
8	9	Tyler Reddick	JR Motorsports	Chevrolet
9	7	Justin Allgaier	JR Motorsports	Chevrolet
10	19	Brandon Jones	Joe Gibbs Racing	Toyota
11	23	Chase Elliott	GMS Racing	Chevrolet
12	11	Ryan Truex	Kaulig Racing	Chevrolet
13	2	Matt Tifft	Richard Childress Racing	Chevrolet
14	3	Shane Lee	Richard Childress Racing	Chevrolet
15	16	Ryan Reed	Roush Fenway Racing	Ford
16	4	Ross Chastain	JD Motorsports	Chevrolet
17	5	Michael Annett	JR Motorsports	Chevrolet
18	39	Ryan Sieg	RSS Racing	Chevrolet
19	51	Jeremy Clements	Jeremy Clements Racing	Chevrolet
20	35	Joey Gase	Go Green Racing with SS-Green Light Racing	Chevrolet
21	36	Alex Labbé	DGM Racing	Chevrolet
22	0	Garrett Smithley	JD Motorsports	Chevrolet
23	60	Austin Cindric	Roush Fenway Racing	Ford
24	8	Caesar Bacarella	B. J. McLeod Motorsports	Chevrolet
25	38	J. J. Yeley	RSS Racing	Chevrolet
26	78	Blake Jones	B. J. McLeod Motorsports	Toyota
27	52	David Starr	Jimmy Means Racing	Chevrolet
28	90	Josh Williams	DGM Racing	Chevrolet
29	01	Vinnie Miller	JD Motorsports	Chevrolet
30	76	Spencer Boyd	SS-Green Light Racing	Chevrolet
31	93	Jeff Green	RSS Racing	Chevrolet
32	15	B. J. McLeod	JD Motorsports	Chevrolet
33	45	Josh Bilicki	JP Motorsports	Toyota
34	55	Brandon Hightower	JP Motorsports	Toyota
35	40	Chad Finchum	MBM Motorsports	Toyota
36	66	Timmy Hill	MBM Motorsports	Toyota
37	74	Mike Harmon	Mike Harmon Racing	Chevrolet
38	61	Kaz Grala	Fury Race Cars	Ford
39	99	Ray Black Jr.	B. J. McLeod Motorsports	Toyota
40	24	Justin Haley	GMS Racing	Chevrolet
Withdrew
WD	89	Morgan Shepherd	Shepherd Racing Ventures	Chevrolet
Official starting lineup

== Race results ==
Stage 1 Laps: 30

Pos.	#	Driver	Team	Make	Pts
1	42	Kyle Larson	Chip Ganassi Racing	Chevrolet	0
2	23	Chase Elliott	GMS Racing	Chevrolet	0
3	1	Elliott Sadler	JR Motorsports	Chevrolet	8
4	7	Justin Allgaier	JR Motorsports	Chevrolet	7
5	22	Ryan Blaney	Team Penske	Ford	0
6	2	Matt Tifft	Richard Childress Racing	Chevrolet	5
7	60	Austin Cindric	Roush Fenway Racing	Ford	4
8	00	Cole Custer	Stewart-Haas Racing with Biagi-DenBeste	Ford	3
9	21	Daniel Hemric	Richard Childress Racing	Chevrolet	2
10	11	Ryan Truex	Kaulig Racing	Chevrolet	1

Stage 2 Laps: 30

Pos.	#	Driver	Team	Make	Pts
1	42	Kyle Larson	Chip Ganassi Racing	Chevrolet	0
2	23	Chase Elliott	GMS Racing	Chevrolet	0
3	60	Austin Cindric	Roush Fenway Racing	Ford	8
4	22	Ryan Blaney	Team Penske	Ford	0
5	9	Tyler Reddick	JR Motorsports	Chevrolet	6
6	7	Justin Allgaier	JR Motorsports	Chevrolet	5
7	24	Justin Haley	GMS Racing	Chevrolet	0
8	2	Matt Tifft	Richard Childress Racing	Chevrolet	3
9	1	Elliott Sadler	JR Motorsports	Chevrolet	2
10	21	Daniel Hemric	Richard Childress Racing	Chevrolet	1

Stage 3 Laps: 45

Pos.	St	#	Driver	Team	Make	Laps	Led	Status	Pts
1	7	42	Kyle Larson	Chip Ganassi Racing	Chevrolet	105	40	running	0
2	5	1	Elliott Sadler	JR Motorsports	Chevrolet	105	17	running	45
3	6	20	Christopher Bell	Joe Gibbs Racing	Toyota	105	0	running	34
4	2	22	Ryan Blaney	Team Penske	Ford	105	39	running	0
5	38	61	Kaz Grala	Fury Race Cars	Ford	105	0	running	32
6	14	3	Shane Lee	Richard Childress Racing	Chevrolet	105	0	running	31
7	36	66	Timmy Hill	MBM Motorsports	Toyota	105	0	running	30
8	4	21	Daniel Hemric	Richard Childress Racing	Chevrolet	105	0	running	32
9	9	7	Justin Allgaier	JR Motorsports	Chevrolet	105	0	running	40
10	16	4	Ross Chastain	JD Motorsports	Chevrolet	105	0	running	27
11	17	5	Michael Annett	JR Motorsports	Chevrolet	105	0	running	26
12	10	19	Brandon Jones	Joe Gibbs Racing	Toyota	105	0	running	25
13	12	11	Ryan Truex	Kaulig Racing	Chevrolet	105	0	running	25
14	35	40	Chad Finchum	MBM Motorsports	Toyota	105	0	running	23
15	21	36	Alex Labbé	DGM Racing	Chevrolet	105	0	running	22
16	25	38	J. J. Yeley	RSS Racing	Chevrolet	105	0	running	21
17	30	76	Spencer Boyd	SS-Green Light Racing	Chevrolet	105	0	running	20
18	40	24	Justin Haley (Note: Haley initially won the race, but was demoted to 18th (the last position of the lead lap) for a last-lap track limit violation.)	GMS Racing	Chevrolet	105	1	running	0
19	29	01	Vinnie Miller	JD Motorsports	Chevrolet	104	0	running	18
20	13	2	Matt Tifft	Richard Childress Racing	Chevrolet	103	0	running	25
21	37	74	Mike Harmon	Mike Harmon Racing	Chevrolet	102	0	running	16
22	39	99	Ray Black Jr.	B. J. McLeod Motorsports	Toyota	102	0	running	15
23	31	93	Jeff Green	RSS Racing	Chevrolet	98	0	crash	14
24	28	90	Josh Williams	DGM Racing	Chevrolet	97	0	crash	13
25	3	00	Cole Custer	Stewart-Haas Racing with Biagi-DenBeste	Ford	97	8	crash	15
26	15	16	Ryan Reed	Roush Fenway Racing	Ford	97	0	crash	11
27	18	39	Ryan Sieg	RSS Racing	Chevrolet	97	0	crash	10
28	22	0	Garrett Smithley	JD Motorsports	Chevrolet	94	0	crash	9
29	11	23	Chase Elliott	GMS Racing	Chevrolet	90	0	engine	0
30	34	55	Brandon Hightower	JP Motorsports	Toyota	87	0	crash	7
31	8	9	Tyler Reddick	JR Motorsports	Chevrolet	82	0	crash	12
32	20	35	Joey Gase	Go Green Racing with SS-Green Light Racing	Chevrolet	82	0	crash	5
33	23	60	Austin Cindric	Roush Fenway Racing	Ford	81	0	crash	16
34	19	51	Jeremy Clements	Jeremy Clements Racing	Chevrolet	81	0	crash	3
35	27	52	David Starr	Jimmy Means Racing	Chevrolet	81	0	crash	2
36	32	15	B. J. McLeod	JD Motorsports	Chevrolet	81	0	crash	1
37	26	78	Blake Jones	B. J. McLeod Motorsports	Toyota	75	0	crash	1
38	24	8	Caesar Bacarella	B. J. McLeod Motorsports	Chevrolet	70	0	crash	1
39	1	18	Ryan Preece	Joe Gibbs Racing	Toyota	51	0	overheating	1
40	33	45	Josh Bilicki	JP Motorsports	Toyota	33	0	engine	1
Withdrew
WD		89	Morgan Shepherd	Shepherd Racing Ventures	Chevrolet				
Official race results

== Notes ==
Previous race: 2018 Overton's 300	NASCAR Xfinity Series; 2018 season	Next race: 2018 Alsco 300 (Kentucky)
