= Darius Grala =

Polish-American racing driver

- Nationality: Polish-American
- Born: July 7, 1964 (age 62) Słupsk, Poland
- Relatives: Kaz Grala (son)

Grand-Am
- Years active: 2002–2005
- Teams: Park Place Racing, Morgan Dollar Motorsports, Cegwa Sport, Southard Motorsports
- Starts: 24
- Wins: 1
- Poles: 1
- Best finish: 11th in 2003

Darius Grala (born July 7, 1964 in Słupsk, Poland) is an endurance sports car racing driver. He is currently racing in North America and living in the United States. In 2007, Grala was one of the founding instructors for Supercar Life. In 2006, Grala was one of the founding instructors of the Ferrari Driving Experience. He continued working with Ferrari in 2007.

In 2005, while driving for the BMW Southard Motorsports team, Grala won the Grand-Am Daytona Prototype Sportsman of the Year Award. He has been a Daytona Prototype driver since the class debuted in the 2003 Rolex 24 Hours of Daytona. In that first race, he ran in the top-five through most of the night until a mechanical failure in the fifteenth-hour took him out of the race while running in second place overall.

On June 22, 2003, Grala had his first podium finish in a Daytona Prototype at his home track in Watkins Glen, New York.

Prior to the introduction of the Daytona Prototype class, Grala competed in the Grand-Am GTS class. He got his first Rolex Series win in the GTS Class, also at Watkins Glen International.

Before racing in the Rolex Series, Grala competed in the Ferrari Challenge. The three-year effort netted multiple wins and pole positions, and culminated with Grala being crowned the 2002 North American Champion.

Grala is the owner of NASCAR Xfinity Series team Fury Race Cars. His son, Kaz Grala, races in the series.
