= 2018 Alsco 300 (Kentucky) =

17th race of the 2018 NASCAR Xfinity Series

Race details
- Race 17 of 33 of the 2018 NASCAR Xfinity Series
- Date: July 13, 2018
- Official name: 18th Annual Alsco 300
- Location: Sparta, Kentucky, Kentucky Speedway
- Course: Permanent racing facility
- Course length: 1.5 miles (2.41 km)
- Distance: 200 laps, 300 mi (482.803 km)
- Scheduled distance: 200 laps, 300 mi (482.803 km)
- Average speed: 131.884 miles per hour (212.247 km/h)

Pole position
Driver	Cole Custer	Stewart-Haas Racing with Biagi-DenBeste
- Time: 29.759

Most laps led
Driver	Kyle Busch	Joe Gibbs Racing
- Laps: 111

Winner
No. 20	Christopher Bell	Joe Gibbs Racing

Television in the United States
- Network: NBCSN
- Announcers: Rick Allen, Jeff Burton, Steve Letarte, Dale Earnhardt Jr.

Radio in the United States
- Radio: Performance Racing Network

The 2018 Alsco 300 was the 17th stock car race of the 2018 NASCAR Xfinity Series season and the 18th iteration of the event. The race was held on Friday, July 13, 2018, in Sparta, Kentucky, at Kentucky Speedway, a 1.5-mile (2.41 km) tri-oval speedway. The race took the scheduled 200 laps to complete. At race's end, Christopher Bell of Joe Gibbs Racing would come back from a spin early in the race to win his third career NASCAR Xfinity Series win and his second of the season. To fill out the podium, Daniel Hemric of Richard Childress Racing and Kyle Busch of Joe Gibbs Racing would finish second and third, respectively.

== Background ==
The layout of Kentucky Speedway. the venue where the race was held.

Kentucky Speedway is a 1.5-mile (2.4 km) tri-oval speedway in Sparta, Kentucky, which has hosted ARCA, NASCAR and Indy Racing League racing annually since it opened in 2000. The track is currently owned and operated by Speedway Motorsports, Inc. and Jerry Carroll, who, along with four other investors, owned Kentucky Speedway until 2008. The speedway has a grandstand capacity of 117,000. Construction of the speedway began in 1998 and was completed in mid-2000. The speedway has hosted the Gander RV & Outdoors Truck Series, Xfinity Series, IndyCar Series, Indy Lights, and most recently, the NASCAR Cup Series beginning in 2011.

=== Entry list ===
#	Driver	Team	Make	Sponsor
0	Garrett Smithley	JD Motorsports	Chevrolet	FAME USA
00	Cole Custer	Stewart-Haas Racing with Biagi-DenBeste	Ford	Haas Automation
1	Elliott Sadler	JR Motorsports	Chevrolet	OneMain Financial "Lending Done Human"
01	Vinnie Miller	JD Motorsports	Chevrolet	Herb Kinman Chevrolet
2	Matt Tifft	Richard Childress Racing	Chevrolet	Surface Sunscreen
3	Ty Dillon	Richard Childress Racing	Chevrolet	Alsco
4	Ross Chastain	JD Motorsports	Chevrolet	AE Door & Window Co.
5	Michael Annett	JR Motorsports	Chevrolet	Pilot Flying J
7	Justin Allgaier	JR Motorsports	Chevrolet	Dale Jr's Whisky River
8	Ray Black Jr.	B. J. McLeod Motorsports	Chevrolet	JW Transport, CorvetteParts.net
9	Tyler Reddick	JR Motorsports	Chevrolet	BurgerFi
11	Ryan Truex	Kaulig Racing	Chevrolet	Phantom Fireworks
12	Austin Cindric	Team Penske	Ford	Lasik Vision Institute
15	B. J. McLeod	JD Motorsports	Chevrolet	Herb Kinman Chevrolet
16	Ryan Reed	Roush Fenway Racing	Ford	DriveDownA1C.com
18	Kyle Busch	Joe Gibbs Racing	Toyota	NOS Energy Drink
19	Brandon Jones	Joe Gibbs Racing	Toyota	Menards, NRG
20	Christopher Bell	Joe Gibbs Racing	Toyota	Rheem
21	Daniel Hemric	Richard Childress Racing	Chevrolet	South Point Hotel, Casino & Spa
22	Paul Menard	Team Penske	Ford	Discount Tire
23	Spencer Gallagher	GMS Racing	Chevrolet	ISM Connect
35	Joey Gase	Go Green Racing with SS-Green Light Racing	Chevrolet	Pro Master, Donate Life
36	Alex Labbé	DGM Racing	Chevrolet	James Carter Attorney at Law, Sticky Stuff
38	J. J. Yeley	RSS Racing	Chevrolet	RSS Racing
39	Ryan Sieg	RSS Racing	Chevrolet	RSS Racing
40	Chad Finchum	MBM Motorsports	Toyota	Smithbilt Homes
42	John Hunter Nemechek	Chip Ganassi Racing	Chevrolet	Anderson Columbia
45	Josh Bilicki	JP Motorsports	Toyota	Prevagen
51	Jeremy Clements	Jeremy Clements Racing	Chevrolet	RepairableVehicles.com
52	David Starr	Jimmy Means Racing	Chevrolet	Tony's Steaks & Seafood
55	Brandon Hightower	JP Motorsports	Toyota	S. Aaron Siebacher Attorney at Law, NAPA Auto Parts
60	Ty Majeski	Roush Fenway Racing	Ford	Ford
66	Timmy Hill	MBM Motorsports	Dodge	CrashClaimsR.Us
74	Mike Harmon	Mike Harmon Racing	Chevrolet	Shadow Warriors Project, Horizon Transport
76	Spencer Boyd	SS-Green Light Racing	Chevrolet	Grunt Style "This We'll Defend"
78	Blake Jones	B. J. McLeod Motorsports	Chevrolet	KBM Commercial Properties
79	Josh Reaume	Jimmy Means Racing	Chevrolet	Striping Technology
89	Morgan Shepherd	Shepherd Racing Ventures	Chevrolet	Visone RV Motorhome Parts, Racing with Jesus
90	Josh Williams	DGM Racing	Chevrolet	Sleep Well Sleep Disorder Specialists
93	Jeff Green	RSS Racing	Chevrolet	RSS Racing
Official entry list

== Practice ==
=== First practice ===
The first practice session was held on Thursday, July 12, at 4:05 PM EST, and would last for 45 minutes. John Hunter Nemechek of Chip Ganassi Racing would set the fastest time in the session, with a lap of 29.853 and an average speed of 180.886 miles per hour (291.108 km/h).

Pos.	#	Driver	Team	Make	Time	Speed
1	42	John Hunter Nemechek	Chip Ganassi Racing	Chevrolet	29.853	180.886
2	19	Brandon Jones	Joe Gibbs Racing	Toyota	29.918	180.493
3	21	Daniel Hemric	Richard Childress Racing	Chevrolet	30.015	179.910
Full first practice results

=== Second and final practice ===
The second and final practice session, sometimes referred to as Happy Hour, was held on Thursday, July 12, at 6:05 PM EST, and would last for 45 minutes. Ty Majeski of Roush Fenway Racing would set the fastest time in the session, with a lap of 29.717 and an average speed of 181.714 miles per hour (292.440 km/h).

Pos.	#	Driver	Team	Make	Time	Speed
1	60	Ty Majeski	Roush Fenway Racing	Ford	29.717	181.714
2	20	Christopher Bell	Joe Gibbs Racing	Toyota	29.733	181.616
3	21	Daniel Hemric	Richard Childress Racing	Chevrolet	29.973	180.162
Full Happy Hour practice results

== Qualifying ==
Qualifying was held on Friday, July 13, at 5:05 PM EST. Since Kentucky Speedway is under 2 miles (3.2 km), the qualifying system was a multi-car system that included three rounds. The first round was 15 minutes, where every driver would be able to set a lap within the 15 minutes. Then, the second round would consist of the fastest 24 cars in Round 1, and drivers would have 10 minutes to set a lap. Round 3 consisted of the fastest 12 drivers from Round 2, and the drivers would have 5 minutes to set a time. Whoever was fastest in Round 3 would win the pole.

Cole Custer of Stewart-Haas Racing with Biagi-DenBeste would win the pole, advancing through both preliminary rounds and setting a time of 29.759 and an average speed of 181.458 miles per hour (292.028 km/h) in the third round.

No drivers would fail to qualify.

=== Full qualifying results ===
Pos.	#	Driver	Team	Make	Time (R1)	Speed (R1)	Time (R2)	Speed (R2)	Time (R3)	Speed (R3)
1	00	Cole Custer	Stewart-Haas Racing with Biagi-DenBeste	Ford	30.072	179.569	29.868	180.796	29.759	181.458
2	7	Justin Allgaier	JR Motorsports	Chevrolet	30.029	179.826	29.947	180.319	29.828	181.038
3	18	Kyle Busch	Joe Gibbs Racing	Toyota	30.072	179.569	29.790	181.269	29.830	181.026
4	12	Austin Cindric	Team Penske	Ford	30.332	178.030	29.951	180.294	29.854	180.880
5	21	Daniel Hemric	Richard Childress Racing	Chevrolet	30.222	178.678	30.008	179.952	29.904	180.578
6	42	John Hunter Nemechek	Chip Ganassi Racing	Chevrolet	30.133	179.206	30.040	179.760	29.973	180.162
7	2	Matt Tifft	Richard Childress Racing	Chevrolet	30.135	179.194	30.075	179.551	29.982	180.108
8	9	Tyler Reddick	JR Motorsports	Chevrolet	30.092	179.450	30.022	179.868	30.101	179.396
9	16	Ryan Reed	Roush Fenway Racing	Ford	30.233	178.613	29.982	180.108	30.125	179.253
10	1	Elliott Sadler	JR Motorsports	Chevrolet	30.346	177.948	30.082	179.509	30.131	179.217
11	19	Brandon Jones	Joe Gibbs Racing	Toyota	30.157	179.063	29.909	180.548	30.262	178.442
12	20	Christopher Bell	Joe Gibbs Racing	Toyota	29.811	181.141	29.824	181.062	—	—
Eliminated in Round 2
13	11	Ryan Truex	Kaulig Racing	Chevrolet	30.233	178.613	30.116	179.307	—	—
14	22	Paul Menard	Team Penske	Ford	30.377	177.766	30.202	178.796	—	—
15	23	Spencer Gallagher	GMS Racing	Chevrolet	30.222	178.678	30.223	178.672	—	—
16	3	Ty Dillon	Richard Childress Racing	Chevrolet	30.495	177.078	30.280	178.336	—	—
17	5	Michael Annett	JR Motorsports	Chevrolet	30.529	176.881	30.315	178.130	—	—
18	60	Ty Majeski	Roush Fenway Racing	Ford	30.475	177.194	30.333	178.024	—	—
19	39	Ryan Sieg	RSS Racing	Chevrolet	30.581	176.580	30.464	177.258	—	—
20	51	Jeremy Clements	Jeremy Clements Racing	Chevrolet	30.663	176.108	30.498	177.061	—	—
21	4	Ross Chastain	JD Motorsports	Chevrolet	30.748	175.621	30.576	176.609	—	—
22	35	Joey Gase	Go Green Racing with SS-Green Light Racing	Chevrolet	30.782	175.427	30.715	175.810	—	—
23	38	J. J. Yeley	RSS Racing	Chevrolet	30.868	174.938	31.064	173.835	—	—
24	0	Garrett Smithley	JD Motorsports	Chevrolet	31.168	173.255	—	—	—	—
Eliminated in Round 1
25	36	Alex Labbé	DGM Racing	Chevrolet	31.190	173.132	—	—	—	—
26	15	B. J. McLeod	JD Motorsports	Chevrolet	31.255	172.772	—	—	—	—
27	55	Brandon Hightower	JP Motorsports	Toyota	31.304	172.502	—	—	—	—
28	93	Jeff Green	RSS Racing	Chevrolet	31.352	172.238	—	—	—	—
29	66	Timmy Hill	MBM Motorsports	Dodge	31.371	172.133	—	—	—	—
30	52	David Starr	Jimmy Means Racing	Chevrolet	31.394	172.007	—	—	—	—
31	90	Josh Williams	DGM Racing	Chevrolet	31.508	171.385	—	—	—	—
32	89	Morgan Shepherd	Shepherd Racing Ventures	Chevrolet	31.611	170.827	—	—	—	—
33	8	Ray Black Jr.	B. J. McLeod Motorsports	Chevrolet	31.619	170.783	—	—	—	—
Qualified by owner's points
34	45	Josh Bilicki	JP Motorsports	Toyota	31.667	170.525	—	—	—	—
35	40	Chad Finchum	MBM Motorsports	Toyota	31.823	169.689	—	—	—	—
36	76	Spencer Boyd	SS-Green Light Racing	Chevrolet	32.085	168.303	—	—	—	—
37	78	Blake Jones	B. J. McLeod Motorsports	Chevrolet	32.220	167.598	—	—	—	—
38	01	Vinnie Miller	JD Motorsports	Chevrolet	32.318	167.090	—	—	—	—
39	74	Mike Harmon	Mike Harmon Racing	Chevrolet	33.068	163.300	—	—	—	—
Qualified on time
40	79	Josh Reaume	Jimmy Means Racing	Chevrolet	32.945	163.910	—	—	—	—
Official qualifying results
Official starting lineup

== Race results ==
Stage 1 Laps: 45

Pos.	#	Driver	Team	Make	Pts
1	18	Kyle Busch	Joe Gibbs Racing	Toyota	0
2	00	Cole Custer	Stewart-Haas Racing with Biagi-DenBeste	Ford	9
3	42	John Hunter Nemechek	Chip Ganassi Racing	Chevrolet	8
4	2	Matt Tifft	Richard Childress Racing	Chevrolet	7
5	12	Austin Cindric	Team Penske	Ford	6
6	19	Brandon Jones	Joe Gibbs Racing	Toyota	5
7	9	Tyler Reddick	JR Motorsports	Chevrolet	4
8	7	Justin Allgaier	JR Motorsports	Chevrolet	3
9	21	Daniel Hemric	Richard Childress Racing	Chevrolet	2
10	1	Elliott Sadler	JR Motorsports	Chevrolet	1

Stage 2 Laps: 45

Pos.	#	Driver	Team	Make	Pts
1	42	John Hunter Nemechek	Chip Ganassi Racing	Chevrolet	10
2	18	Kyle Busch	Joe Gibbs Racing	Toyota	0
3	00	Cole Custer	Stewart-Haas Racing with Biagi-DenBeste	Ford	8
4	12	Austin Cindric	Team Penske	Ford	7
5	19	Brandon Jones	Joe Gibbs Racing	Toyota	6
6	7	Justin Allgaier	JR Motorsports	Chevrolet	5
7	20	Christopher Bell	Joe Gibbs Racing	Toyota	4
8	9	Tyler Reddick	JR Motorsports	Chevrolet	3
9	22	Paul Menard	Team Penske	Ford	0
10	21	Daniel Hemric	Richard Childress Racing	Chevrolet	1

Stage 3 Laps: 110

Pos.	St	#	Driver	Team	Make	Laps	Led	Status	Pts
1	12	20	Christopher Bell	Joe Gibbs Racing	Toyota	200	17	running	44
2	5	21	Daniel Hemric	Richard Childress Racing	Chevrolet	200	8	running	38
3	3	18	Kyle Busch	Joe Gibbs Racing	Toyota	200	111	running	0
4	2	7	Justin Allgaier	JR Motorsports	Chevrolet	200	32	running	41
5	1	00	Cole Custer	Stewart-Haas Racing with Biagi-DenBeste	Ford	200	14	running	49
6	8	9	Tyler Reddick	JR Motorsports	Chevrolet	200	0	running	38
7	6	42	John Hunter Nemechek	Chip Ganassi Racing	Chevrolet	200	14	running	48
8	9	16	Ryan Reed	Roush Fenway Racing	Ford	200	0	running	29
9	14	22	Paul Menard	Team Penske	Ford	200	0	running	0
10	4	12	Austin Cindric	Team Penske	Ford	200	0	running	40
11	7	2	Matt Tifft	Richard Childress Racing	Chevrolet	200	0	running	33
12	10	1	Elliott Sadler	JR Motorsports	Chevrolet	200	0	running	26
13	13	11	Ryan Truex	Kaulig Racing	Chevrolet	200	0	running	24
14	16	3	Ty Dillon	Richard Childress Racing	Chevrolet	200	0	running	0
15	17	5	Michael Annett	JR Motorsports	Chevrolet	200	4	running	22
16	19	39	Ryan Sieg	RSS Racing	Chevrolet	200	0	running	21
17	21	4	Ross Chastain	JD Motorsports	Chevrolet	200	0	running	20
18	20	51	Jeremy Clements	Jeremy Clements Racing	Chevrolet	200	0	running	19
19	24	0	Garrett Smithley	JD Motorsports	Chevrolet	198	0	running	18
20	15	23	Spencer Gallagher	GMS Racing	Chevrolet	198	0	running	17
21	26	15	B. J. McLeod	JD Motorsports	Chevrolet	196	0	running	16
22	33	8	Ray Black Jr.	B. J. McLeod Motorsports	Chevrolet	196	0	running	15
23	30	52	David Starr	Jimmy Means Racing	Chevrolet	195	0	running	14
24	36	76	Spencer Boyd	SS-Green Light Racing	Chevrolet	195	0	running	13
25	37	78	Blake Jones	B. J. McLeod Motorsports	Chevrolet	194	0	running	12
26	27	55	Brandon Hightower	JP Motorsports	Toyota	194	0	running	11
27	18	60	Ty Majeski	Roush Fenway Racing	Ford	193	0	running	10
28	34	45	Josh Bilicki	JP Motorsports	Toyota	193	0	running	9
29	38	01	Vinnie Miller	JD Motorsports	Chevrolet	192	0	running	8
30	39	74	Mike Harmon	Mike Harmon Racing	Chevrolet	190	0	running	7
31	35	40	Chad Finchum	MBM Motorsports	Toyota	172	0	transmission	6
32	25	36	Alex Labbé	DGM Racing	Chevrolet	168	0	running	5
33	22	35	Joey Gase	Go Green Racing with SS-Green Light Racing	Chevrolet	161	0	crash	4
34	23	38	J. J. Yeley	RSS Racing	Chevrolet	119	0	suspension	3
35	31	90	Josh Williams	DGM Racing	Chevrolet	107	0	carburetor	2
36	11	19	Brandon Jones	Joe Gibbs Racing	Toyota	104	0	crash	12
37	29	66	Timmy Hill	MBM Motorsports	Dodge	55	0	fuel pump	1
38	32	89	Morgan Shepherd	Shepherd Racing Ventures	Chevrolet	25	0	vibration	1
39	40	79	Josh Reaume	Jimmy Means Racing	Chevrolet	9	0	overheating	0
40	28	93	Jeff Green	RSS Racing	Chevrolet	6	0	electrical	1
Official race results

Previous race: 2018 Coca-Cola Firecracker 250	NASCAR Xfinity Series; 2018 season	Next race: 2018 Lakes Region 200
