= NASCAR O'Reilly Auto Parts Series at Atlanta Motor Speedway =

NASCAR O'Reilly Auto Parts Series race at Atlanta Motor Speedway

NASCAR O'Reilly Auto Parts Series
- Venue: Atlanta Motor Speedway
- Location: Hampton, Georgia, United States

Circuit information
- Surface: Asphalt
- Length: 1.54 mi (2.48 km)
- Turns: 4

Stock car racing events in the NASCAR O'Reilly Auto Parts Series have been held at Atlanta Motor Speedway, in Hampton, Georgia during numerous seasons and times of year since 1992.

== Current race ==
Bennett Transportation & Logistics 250
- Corporate sponsor: Bennett Transportations & Logistics
- First race: 1992
- Distance: 251.02 miles (403.98 km)
- Laps: 163; Stages 1/2: 40 each Final stage: 83
- Previous names: Atlanta 300 (1992); Slick 50 300 (1993); Busch Light 300 (1994–1996); Stihl Outdoor Power Tools 300 (1997); Stihl 300 (1998); Yellow Freight 300 (1999); Aaron's 312 (2000–2005); Nicorette 300 (2006–2008); Degree Men V12 300 (2009); Great Clips 300 (2010–2011); NRA American Warrior 300 (2012); Great Clips / Grit Chips 300 (2013); Great Clips 300 benefiting Feed the Children (2014); Hisense 250 (2015); Heads Up Georgia 250 (2016); Rinnai 250 (2017–2019); EchoPark 250 (2020–2021); Nalley Cars 250 (2022); Raptor King of Tough 250 (2023–2024)
- Most wins (driver): Kevin Harvick (5)
- Most wins (team): Roush Fenway Racing (7)
- Most wins (manufacturer): Chevrolet (21)

Circuit information
- Surface: Asphalt
- Length: 1.54 mi (2.48 km)
- Turns: 4

The Bennett Transportation & Logistics 250 is the name of the Spring race. Sheldon Creed is the defending race winner.

=== History ===
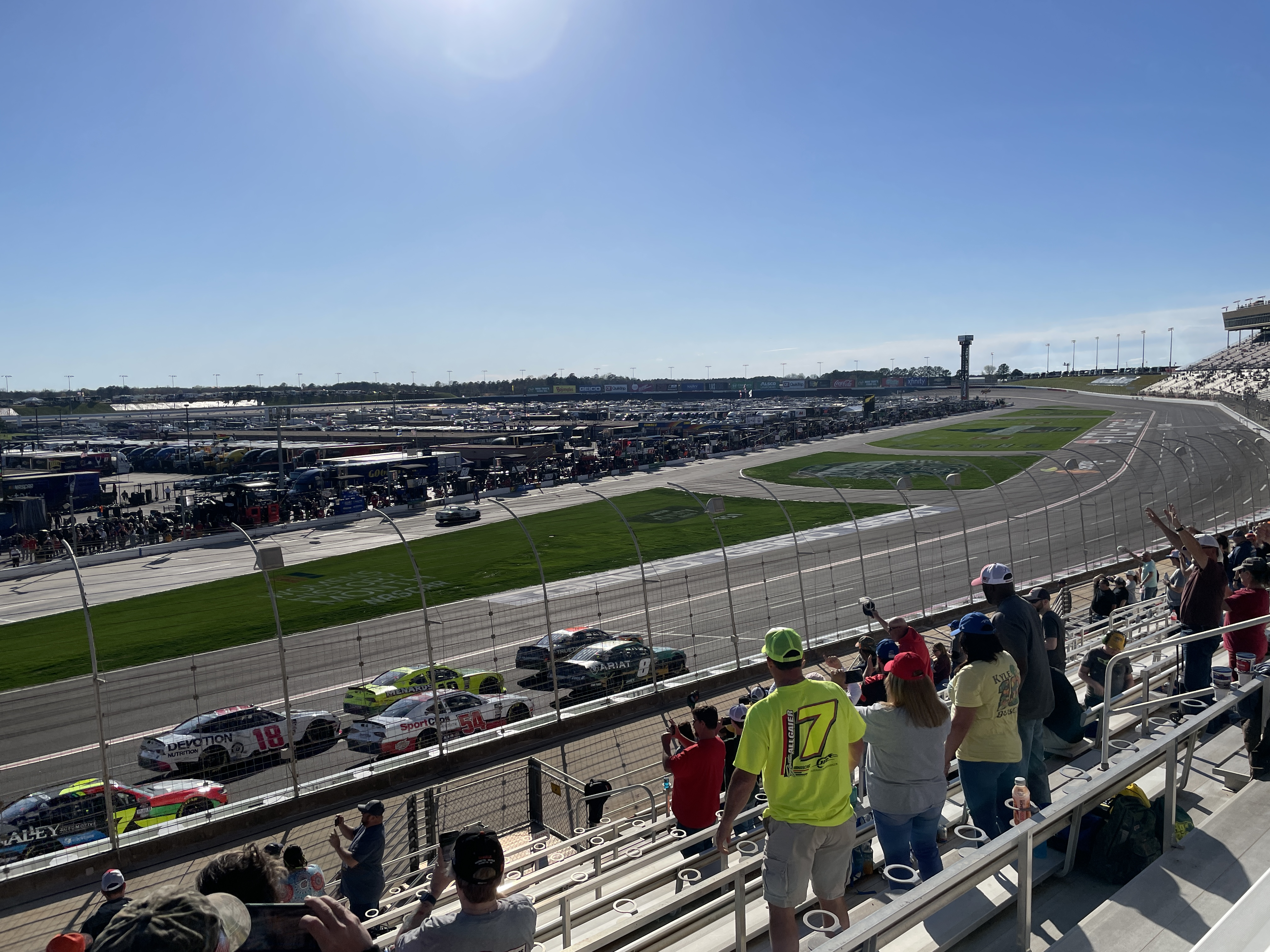
The 2022 Nalley Cars 250

Jeff Gordon, Mike Skinner, Jamie McMurray, and Carl Edwards have gotten their first series wins in this race.

Following the transfer of the season ending Cup series race from Atlanta to Homestead–Miami Speedway after the 2001 season (although due to the September 11 attacks, the 2001 Atlanta fall race was the second-to-last race of the season when the race at New Hampshire was moved from September to November as the last race of the season), the then 312-mile race was moved to Atlanta's fall race weekend where it remained until Aaron's Rental, who was sponsoring the race, chose instead to sponsor the lone Busch event at Talladega. The race gained sponsorship from GlaxoSmithKline through its Nicorette brand and moved back to its traditional spring date.

In September 2008, NASCAR officials announced that Nicorette would not renew its corporate sponsorship for race after the 2008 season. On October 26, 2008 it was announced that Unilever's deodorant brand Degree will take over sponsorship of this race starting in 2009. It was later announced that the now-Degree V12 300 would be moving to September as part of the latest round of NASCAR realignment, which resulted in the Pep Boys Auto 500, the AMP Energy 500 at Talladega, and the Pepsi 500 at Fontana/Auto Club Speedway trading places. The Degree V12 300 took the place of the Camping World RV Service 300 on NASCAR's Labor Day weekend race schedule and serves as an accompanying race to the AdvoCare 500.

In 2015, the Xfinity race at Atlanta moved along with the Cup race (Folds of Honor QuikTrip 500) to the second weekend of the season and ran as a doubleheader on Saturday afternoon along with the Truck Series. The race was also reduced to 250 miles in order to make the race a doubleheader on the same day.

EchoPark Automotive became the title sponsor of the race in 2020, replacing Rinnai. That year, the race had been moved from being in February and the second race of the season and the first race before the three-race west coast swing to March and as the fifth race of the season as the first race after the west coast swing. However, the race was moved again from March to June due to the COVID-19 pandemic. In 2021, the race returned to March. In 2022, Nalley Automotive Group replaced EchoPark as the title sponsor and the new name of the race was the Nalley Cars 250. In 2023, Raptor Coatings replaced Nalley as the title sponsor and the new name of the race was the Raptor King of Tough 250. In 2025, Bennett Transportation & Logistics, the primary sponsor of defending Atlanta Xfinity Series race winner Austin Hill, would become the title sponsor of this race, replacing Raptor.

==== Past winners ====
Year	Date	No.	Driver	Team	Manufacturer	Race Distance		Race Time	Average Speed (mph)	Report	Ref
Year	Date	No.	Driver	Team	Manufacturer	Laps	Miles (km)	Race Time	Average Speed (mph)	Report	Ref
1992	March 14	1	Jeff Gordon	Bill Davis Racing	Ford	197	299.834 (482.536)	2:24:36	124.412	Report	
1993	November 13*	2	Ward Burton	A.G. Dillard Motorsports	Chevrolet	197	299.834 (482.536)	2:44:05	109.64	Report	
1994	March 12	7	Harry Gant	Whitaker Racing	Chevrolet	197	299.834 (482.536)	2:20:56	127.649	Report	
1995	March 11	74	Johnny Benson Jr.	BACE Motorsports	Chevrolet	197	299.834 (482.536)	2:03:45	145.767	Report	
1996	March 9	5	Terry Labonte	Labonte Motorsports	Chevrolet	197	299.834 (482.536)	2:08:15	139.656	Report	
1997*	March 8	60	Mark Martin	Roush Racing	Ford	197	299.834 (482.536)	1:58:55	151.751	Report	
1998*	November 7	60	Mark Martin	Roush Racing	Ford	195	300.3 (483.286)	2:10:23	138.193	Report	
1999	March 13	19	Mike Skinner	Emerald Performance Group	Chevrolet	195	300.3 (483.286)	2:33:46	117.178	Report	
2000	March 11*	60	Mark Martin	Roush Racing	Ford	203	312.62 (503.113)	2:27:47	126.924	Report	
2001	March 10	87	Joe Nemechek	NEMCO Motorsports	Chevrolet	203	312.62 (503.113)	2:10:18	143.954	Report	
2002	October 26	27	Jamie McMurray	Brewco Motorsports	Chevrolet	203	312.62 (503.113)	2:15:09	138.788	Report	
2003	October 25	7	Greg Biffle	Evans Motorsports	Chevrolet	203	312.62 (503.113)	2:08:17	146.217	Report	
2004	October 30	17	Matt Kenseth	Reiser Enterprises	Ford	208*	320.32 (515.505)	2:24:08	133.343	Report	
2005	March 19	60	Carl Edwards	Roush Racing	Ford	203	312.62 (503.113)	2:23:34	130.651	Report	
2006	March 18	21	Jeff Burton	Richard Childress Racing	Chevrolet	195	300.3 (483.286)	2:20:47	127.984	Report	
2007	March 17	29	Jeff Burton	Richard Childress Racing	Chevrolet	195	300.3 (483.286)	2:21:39	127.201	Report	
2008	March 8	17	Matt Kenseth	Roush Fenway Racing	Ford	198*	304.92 (490.721)	2:19:21	131.29	Report	
2009	September 5	33	Kevin Harvick	Kevin Harvick Inc.	Chevrolet	195	300.3 (483.286)	2:04:04	145.228	Report	
2010	September 4	88	Jamie McMurray	JR Motorsports	Chevrolet	195	300.3 (483.286)	2:04:44	144.452	Report	
2011	September 3	60	Carl Edwards	Roush Fenway Racing	Ford	195	300.3 (483.286)	2:15:40	132.811	Report	
2012	September 1	6	Ricky Stenhouse Jr.	Roush Fenway Racing	Ford	195	300.3 (483.286)	2:32:51	117.88	Report	
2013	August 31	33	Kevin Harvick	Richard Childress Racing	Chevrolet	195	300.3 (483.286)	2:08:01	140.747	Report	
2014	August 30	5	Kevin Harvick	JR Motorsports	Chevrolet	195	300.3 (483.286)	2:08:37	140.091	Report	
2015	February 28	88	Kevin Harvick	JR Motorsports	Chevrolet	163	251.02 (403.977)	1:40:32	149.813	Report	
2016	February 27	18	Kyle Busch	Joe Gibbs Racing	Toyota	163	251.02 (403.977)	1:49:53	137.065	Report	
2017	March 4	18	Kyle Busch	Joe Gibbs Racing	Toyota	163	251.02 (403.977)	1:57:16	128.435	Report	
2018	February 24	98	Kevin Harvick	Stewart–Haas Racing with Biagi–DenBeste Racing	Ford	163	251.02 (403.977)	1:56:09	129.67	Report	
2019	February 23	20	Christopher Bell	Joe Gibbs Racing	Toyota*	163	251.02 (403.977)	1:48:00	139.456	Report	
2020	June 6*	16	A. J. Allmendinger	Kaulig Racing	Chevrolet	163	251.02 (403.977)	2:02:37	122.832	Report	
2021	March 20	7	Justin Allgaier	JR Motorsports	Chevrolet	163	251.02 (403.977)	2:10:50	115.117	Report	
2022	March 19	54	Ty Gibbs	Joe Gibbs Racing	Toyota	172*	264.88 (426.282)	2:36:39	101.454	Report	
2023	March 18	21	Austin Hill	Richard Childress Racing	Chevrolet	163	251.02 (403.977)	2:44:49	91.382	Report	
2024	February 24	21	Austin Hill	Richard Childress Racing	Chevrolet	169*	260.26 (418)	1:55:16	135.474	Report	
2025	February 22	21	Austin Hill	Richard Childress Racing	Chevrolet	163	251.02 (403.977)	2:21:18	106.59	Report	
2026	February 21	00	Sheldon Creed	Haas Factory Team	Chevrolet	163	251.02 (403.977)	2:22:45	174.318	Report	
2027	February 27									Report	

Notes:

- 1993: Race postponed from March due to blizzard.
- 2004, 2008, 2022 and 2024: Races extended due to NASCAR overtime.
- 2020: Race postponed from March 14 due to the COVID-19 pandemic.

==== Multiple winners (drivers) ====
# Wins	Driver	Years won
5	Kevin Harvick	2009, 2013-2015, 2018
3	Mark Martin	1997, 1998, 2000
3	Austin Hill	2023-2025
2	Jamie McMurray	2002, 2010
2	Matt Kenseth	2004, 2008
2	Carl Edwards	2005, 2011
2	Jeff Burton	2006, 2007
2	Kyle Busch	2016, 2017

==== Multiple winners (teams) ====
# Wins	Team	Years won
7	Roush Fenway Racing	1997, 1998, 2000, 2005, 2008, 2011, 2012
6	Richard Childress Racing	2006, 2007, 2013, 2023-2025
4	JR Motorsports	2010, 2014, 2015, 2021
4	Joe Gibbs Racing	2016, 2017, 2019, 2022

==== Manufacturer wins ====
# Wins	Make	Years won
21	(United States) Chevrolet	1993-1996, 1999, 2001-2003, 2006, 2007, 2009, 2010, 2013-2015, 2020, 2021, 2023-2026
10	(United States) Ford	1992, 1997, 1998, 2000, 2004, 2005, 2008, 2011, 2012, 2018
4	(Japan) Toyota	2016, 2017, 2019, 2022

== Former second race ==
Focused Health 250
- Corporate sponsor: Focused Health
- First race: 2021
- Last race: 2026
- Distance: 251.02 miles (403.98 km)
- Laps: 163; Stages 1/2: 45 each Final stage: 73
- Previous names: Credit Karma Money 250 (2021); Alsco Uniforms 250 (2022-2023)
- Most wins (driver): Austin Hill (2)
- Most wins (team): Joe Gibbs Racing; Richard Childress Racing (2)
- Most wins (manufacturer): Chevrolet (4)

Circuit information
- Surface: Asphalt
- Length: 1.54 mi (2.48 km)
- Turns: 4

The Focused Health 250 was the name of the summer race. Justin Allgaier was the final race winner of the race, having won it in 2026.

=== History ===
In 2021, when the NASCAR Cup Series got a second race at Atlanta for the first time since 2010, this Xfinity Series race was added to the schedule on the same weekend in July as the new Cup Series race. Credit Karma held the naming rights to the race that year. In 2022, Alsco replaced Credit Karma as the title sponsor. When the start times for all of NASCAR's events were announced, the 2023 event would become a Saturday night event to coincide with the track's second Cup race returning to a nighttime event. In 2024, with collaboration with Speedway Motorsports, Focused Health took over as the title sponsor in Atlanta and COTA. The race was removed in 2027.

==== Past winners ====
Year	Date	No.	Driver	Team	Manufacturer	Race distance		Race time	Average speed (mph)	Report	Ref
Year	Date	No.	Driver	Team	Manufacturer	Laps	Miles (km)	Race time	Average speed (mph)	Report	Ref
2021	July 10	54	Kyle Busch	Joe Gibbs Racing	Toyota	164*	252.56 (406.72)	2:18:59	109.032	Report	
2022	July 9	21	Austin Hill	Richard Childress Racing	Chevrolet	163	251.02 (404.24)	1:57:36	128.071	Report	
2023	July 8	20	John Hunter Nemechek	Joe Gibbs Racing	Toyota	169*	260.26 (419.119)	2:24:33	108.029	Report	
2024	September 7	21	Austin Hill	Richard Childress Racing	Chevrolet	163	251.02 (404.24)	2:07:05	118.514	Report	
2025	June 27–28*	48	Nick Sanchez	Big Machine Racing	Chevrolet	163	251.02 (404.24)	2:36:14	96.402	Report	
2026	July 11	7	Justin Allgaier	JR Motorsports	Chevrolet	172*	264.88 (426.56)	2:58:27	89.06	Report	

- 2021, 2023 & 2026: Races extended due to an overtime.
- 2025: After a long red flag delay for lightning strikes, the first two stages of the race were held on Friday, with the final stage ending on Saturday.

==== Multiple winners (drivers) ====
# Wins	Driver	Years won
2	Austin Hill	2022, 2024

==== Multiple winners (teams) ====
# Wins	Team	Years won
2	Joe Gibbs Racing	2021, 2023
2	Richard Childress Racing	2022, 2024

=== Manufacturer wins ===
# Wins	Make	Years won
4	(United States) Chevrolet	2022, 2024, 2025, 2026
2	(Japan) Toyota	2021, 2023

Previous race: United Rentals 300	NASCAR O'Reilly Auto Parts Series; Bennett Transportation & Logistics 250	Next race: Focused Health 250
