= NASCAR Xfinity Series at Kentucky Speedway =

Auto race series in Sparta, Kentucky, USA

NASCAR Xfinity Series
- Venue: Kentucky Speedway
- Location: Sparta, Kentucky, United States

Circuit information
- Surface: Asphalt
- Length: 1.5 mi (2.4 km)
- Turns: 4

Stock car racing events in the NASCAR Xfinity Series had been held at Kentucky Speedway in Sparta, Kentucky, during numerous seasons and times of year from 2001 to 2020.

== First race ==
The Alsco 300 was a NASCAR Xfinity Series race held at Kentucky Speedway in Sparta, Kentucky, United States. The distance of the race was 300 mi (480 km)

Alsco 300

NASCAR Xfinity Series
- Corporate sponsor: Alsco
- First race: 2001
- Last race: 2020
- Distance: 300 miles (480 km)
- Laps: 200 (Stage 1: 45 Stage 2: 45 Stage 3: 110)
- Previous names: Outback Steakhouse 300 (2001); Kroger 300 (2002); Meijer 300 (2003–2010); Feed the Children 300 (2011–2013); John R. Elliott HERO Campaign 300 presented by Drive Sober or Get Pulled Over (2014); Kentucky 300 (2015)
- Most wins (driver): Joey Logano; Brad Keselowski; Kyle Busch (3)
- Most wins (team): Joe Gibbs Racing (6)
- Most wins (manufacturer): Ford (7)

=== History ===
Kentucky Speedway, opened in 2000 by Jerry Carrol, held its first Busch Series race in 2001. Brad Paisley sang the National Anthem, and then-Cincinnati Bengals player Corey Dillon gave the command to start engines. This race saw Travis Kvapil go upside down after clipping Rich Bickle's No. 59 car off of Turn 2, and the car slid all the way down the backstretch in the turn three grass. Kevin Harvick won the inaugural event.

Hypermarket chain Meijer was the race's sponsor since 2003 after previous sponsorship from Outback Steakhouse and Kroger. Nabisco, through its Oreo and Ritz brands, had been an associate sponsor since the 2002 race. For 2011, the race was sponsored by the Nonprofit organization Feed The Children. Starting in 2016, the race was sponsored by Alsco. In 2017, Alsco signed a multi-year agreement to continue being the sponsor of the NASCAR XFINITY Series race. Alsco is one of only two companies to serve as entitlement sponsor of multiple Xfinity Series events. Each year Alsco provides its sponsorship partners, employees, customer and prospects with over 1,500 tickets to the race.

Kentucky was removed from the 2021 Xfinity schedule.

=== Past winners ===
Year	Date	No.	Driver	Team	Manufacturer	Race Distance		Race Time	Average Speed (mph)	Report	Ref
Year	Date	No.	Driver	Team	Manufacturer	Laps	Miles (km)	Race Time	Average Speed (mph)	Report	Ref
2001	June 16	2	Kevin Harvick	Richard Childress Racing	Chevrolet	200	300 (482.803)	2:31:47	118.59	Report	
2002	June 15/16*	92	Todd Bodine	Herzog Motorsports	Chevrolet	200	300 (482.803)	2:21:33	127.164	Report	
2003	June 14	25	Bobby Hamilton Jr.	Team Rensi Motorsports	Ford	200	300 (482.803)	2:12:14	136.123	Report	
2004	June 19	5	Kyle Busch	Hendrick Motorsports	Chevrolet	200	300 (482.803)	2:22:08	126.642	Report	
2005	June 18	60	Carl Edwards	Roush Racing	Ford	200	300 (482.803)	2:33:42	117.111	Report	
2006	June 17	84	David Gilliland	Clay Andrews Racing	Chevrolet	200	300 (482.803)	2:35:10	116.004	Report	
2007	June 16	90	Stephen Leicht	Robert Yates Racing	Ford	200	300 (482.803)	2:32:56	117.698	Report	
2008	June 14	20	Joey Logano	Joe Gibbs Racing	Toyota	200	300 (482.803)	2:12:50	135.508	Report	
2009	June 13	20	Joey Logano	Joe Gibbs Racing	Toyota	200	300 (482.803)	2:20:51	127.796	Report	
2010	June 12	20	Joey Logano	Joe Gibbs Racing	Toyota	200	300 (482.803)	2:36:08	115.286	Report	
2011	July 8	22	Brad Keselowski	Penske Racing	Dodge	200	300 (482.803)	2:10.03	138.408	Report	
2012	June 29	3	Austin Dillon	Richard Childress Racing	Chevrolet	200	300 (482.803)	1:58:42	151.643	Report	
2013	June 28	22	Brad Keselowski	Penske Racing	Ford	170*	255 (410.382)	1:56:39	131.162	Report	
2014	June 27	5	Kevin Harvick	JR Motorsports	Chevrolet	200	300 (482.803)	2:15:33	132.792	Report	
2015	July 10	22	Brad Keselowski	Team Penske	Ford	200	300 (482.803)	2:12:18	136.054	Report	
2016	July 8	18	Kyle Busch	Joe Gibbs Racing	Toyota	201*	301.5 (485.217)	2:05:24	144:258	Report	
2017	July 8*	18	Kyle Busch	Joe Gibbs Racing	Toyota	200	300 (482.803)	2:30:56	119.258	Report	
2018	July 13	20	Christopher Bell	Joe Gibbs Racing	Toyota	200	300 (482.803)	2:16:29	131.884	Report	
2019	July 12	00	Cole Custer	Stewart–Haas Racing with Biagi-DenBeste	Ford	200	300 (482.803)	2:09:05	139.445	Report	
2020	July 10	22	Austin Cindric	Team Penske	Ford	200	300 (482.803)	2:13:25	134.916	Report	

- 2002: Race started on Saturday night but was finished on Sunday afternoon due to rain.
- 2013: Race shortened due to rain.
- 2016: Race extended due to overtime.
- 2017: Race postponed from Friday night to Saturday afternoon due to severe weather.

==== Multiple winners (drivers) ====
# Wins	Driver	Years won
3	Joey Logano	2008, 2009, 2010
3	Brad Keselowski	2011, 2013, 2015
3	Kyle Busch	2004, 2016, 2017
2	Kevin Harvick	2001, 2014

==== Multiple winners (teams) ====
# Wins	Team	Years won
6	Joe Gibbs Racing	2008, 2009, 2010, 2016, 2017, 2018
4	Team Penske	2011, 2013, 2015, 2020
2	Richard Childress Racing	2001, 2012

==== Manufacturer wins ====
# Wins	Make	Years won
7	(United States) Ford	2003, 2005, 2007, 2013, 2015, 2019, 2020
6	(United States) Chevrolet	2001, 2002, 2004, 2006, 2012, 2014
6	(Japan) Toyota	2008, 2009, 2010, 2016, 2017, 2018
1	(United States) Dodge	2011

== Second race ==
Shady Rays 200
- Corporate sponsor: Shady Rays
- First race: 2012
- Last race: 2020
- Distance: 300 mi (480 km)
- Laps: 200 (Stage 1: 45 Stage 2: 45 Stage 3: 110)
- Previous names: Kentucky 300 (2012–2013); VisitMyrtleBeach.com 300 (2014–2017); Shady Rays 200 (2020)
- Most wins (driver): Ryan Blaney (2)
- Most wins (team): Team Penske (3)
- Most wins (manufacturer): Chevrolet (4)

The Shady Rays 200 was a race run by NASCAR Xfinity Series at Kentucky Speedway in Sparta, Kentucky, United States. It was first run in 2012, and was won by the winner of the Feed the Children 300, Austin Dillon. The distance of the race was 300 miles (480 km).

=== History ===
This race was used as a filler for the Kentucky Indy 300 race that ran here from 2001 to 2011. Starting in 2016, it was the first race in the Round of 12 for the NASCAR Xfinity Series playoffs. On March 8, 2017, it was announced that Las Vegas Motor Speedway, another SMI track, would get a second Cup date, a second Xfinity date, and a second Truck date. While the Fall Cup race and Truck race at New Hampshire Motor Speedway went there, Kentucky lost this race and was moved to Las Vegas.

The first time that this race was run was in 2012, and it was won by Austin Dillon, the contender and winner of the NASCAR Rookie of the Year award and pole winner.

Despite being off the schedule since 2017, the race was briefly restored during the 2020 season as a replacement for the New Hampshire Motor Speedway event due to the COVID-19 pandemic, in a July doubleheader with the Alsco 300. The race, the Shady Rays 200, was held the day before the Alsco 300.

=== Past winners ===
Year	Date	No.	Driver	Team	Manufacturer	Race Distance		Race Time	Average Speed (mph)	Report	Ref
Year	Date	No.	Driver	Team	Manufacturer	Laps	Miles (km)	Race Time	Average Speed (mph)	Report	Ref
2012	September 22	3	Austin Dillon	Richard Childress Racing	Chevrolet	200	300 (482.803)	2:10:55	137.492	Report	
2013	September 21	22	Ryan Blaney	Penske Racing	Ford	200	300 (482.803)	2:28:36	121.131	Report	
2014	September 20	62	Brendan Gaughan	Richard Childress Racing	Chevrolet	200	300 (482.803)	2:21:36	127.119	Report	
2015	September 26	22	Ryan Blaney	Team Penske	Ford	201*	301.5 (485.217)	2:44:06	110.238	Report	
2016	September 24	1	Elliott Sadler	JR Motorsports	Chevrolet	200	300 (482.803)	2:48:37	106.751	Report	
2017	September 23	42	Tyler Reddick	Chip Ganassi Racing	Chevrolet	200	300 (482.803)	1:58:38	151.728	Report	
2018 – 2019	Not held										
2020*	July 9	22	Austin Cindric	Team Penske	Ford	136*	204 (328.306)	1:51:31	109.759	Report	

- 2015 & 2020: Race extended due to overtime.
- 2017: Race distance time and average speed record.
- 2020: Race added due to COVID-19 pandemic replaced New Hampshire Motor Speedway.

==== Multiple winners (drivers) ====
# Wins	Team	Years won
2	Ryan Blaney	2013, 2015

==== Multiple winners (teams) ====
# Wins	Team	Years won
3	Team Penske	2013, 2015, 2020
2	Richard Childress Racing	2012, 2014

==== Manufacturer wins ====
# Wins	Make	Years won
4	(United States) Chevrolet	2012, 2014, 2016, 2017
3	(United States) Ford	2013, 2015, 2020

== See also ==
- Quaker State 400 (Kentucky)
- NASCAR Camping World Truck Series at Kentucky Speedway
- General Tire 150 (Kentucky)
