= NASCAR O'Reilly Auto Parts Series at Charlotte Motor Speedway =

Annual motor race in North Carolina, USA

NASCAR O'Reilly Auto Parts Series
- Venue: Charlotte Motor Speedway
- Location: Concord, North Carolina, U.S.
- Distance: Length; Oval: 1.5 miles (2.4 km); Road Course: 2.32 miles (3.73 km); Turns; Oval: 4 Road Course: 17

Circuit information
- Surface: Asphalt

Stock car racing events in the NASCAR O'Reilly Auto Parts Series have been held annually at Charlotte Motor Speedway in Concord, North Carolina since 1982.

== Spring race ==
Charbroil 300
- Corporate sponsor: Charbroil
- First race: 1982
- Distance: 300 miles (480 km)
- Laps: 200; Stages 1/2: 45 each Final stage: 110
- Previous names: Mello Yello 300 (1982–1984); Winn-Dixie 300 (1985–1988); Champion Spark Plug 300 (1989–1994); Red Dog 300 (1995–1996); Carquest Auto Parts 300 (1997–2009); Tech-Net Professional Auto Service 300 presented by CarQuest (2010); Top Gear 300 (2011); History 300 (2012–2014); Hisense 300 (2015); Hisense 4K TV 300 (2016–2017); Alsco 300 (2018–2020); Alsco Uniforms 300 (2021–2023); BetMGM 300 (2024–2025)
- Most wins (driver): Kyle Busch (6)
- Most wins (team): Roush Fenway Racing; Hendrick Motorsports (6)
- Most wins (manufacturer): Chevrolet (16)

The Charbroil 300 is an annual 300 miles (480 km) NASCAR O'Reilly Auto Parts Series race held at the Charlotte Motor Speedway in Concord, North Carolina that takes place during Memorial Day weekend as a support race for the NASCAR Cup Series' Coca-Cola 600.

Ross Chastain is the defending race winner, having won the event in 2026.

=== History ===
The race's origins trace back to 1978, when a NASCAR Late Model Sportsman Series race was held the day before the World 600. In 1982, it then became a Busch Series race.

From its inception through 2004, the race was scheduled for Saturday afternoon. In 1985 only, it was held the same day as The Winston. Lights were installed at Charlotte in 1993, and from 2005 to 2009, the race was a Saturday night race. In 2010, the race was moved back to the afternoon. Eastern in response to fans wanting an afternoon race and allowing for ABC coverage. In 2015, the race's broadcast was transferred to NASCAR on Fox after the departure of the NASCAR on ESPN content, allowing both of the races in Charlotte (the 300 on Saturday and the 600 on Sunday) to air on Fox.

In 2018, Alsco, a linen and uniform rental services company, became the entitlement sponsor for the race, dubbing it the Alsco 300. The name was tweaked in 2021 to become the Alsco Uniforms 300.

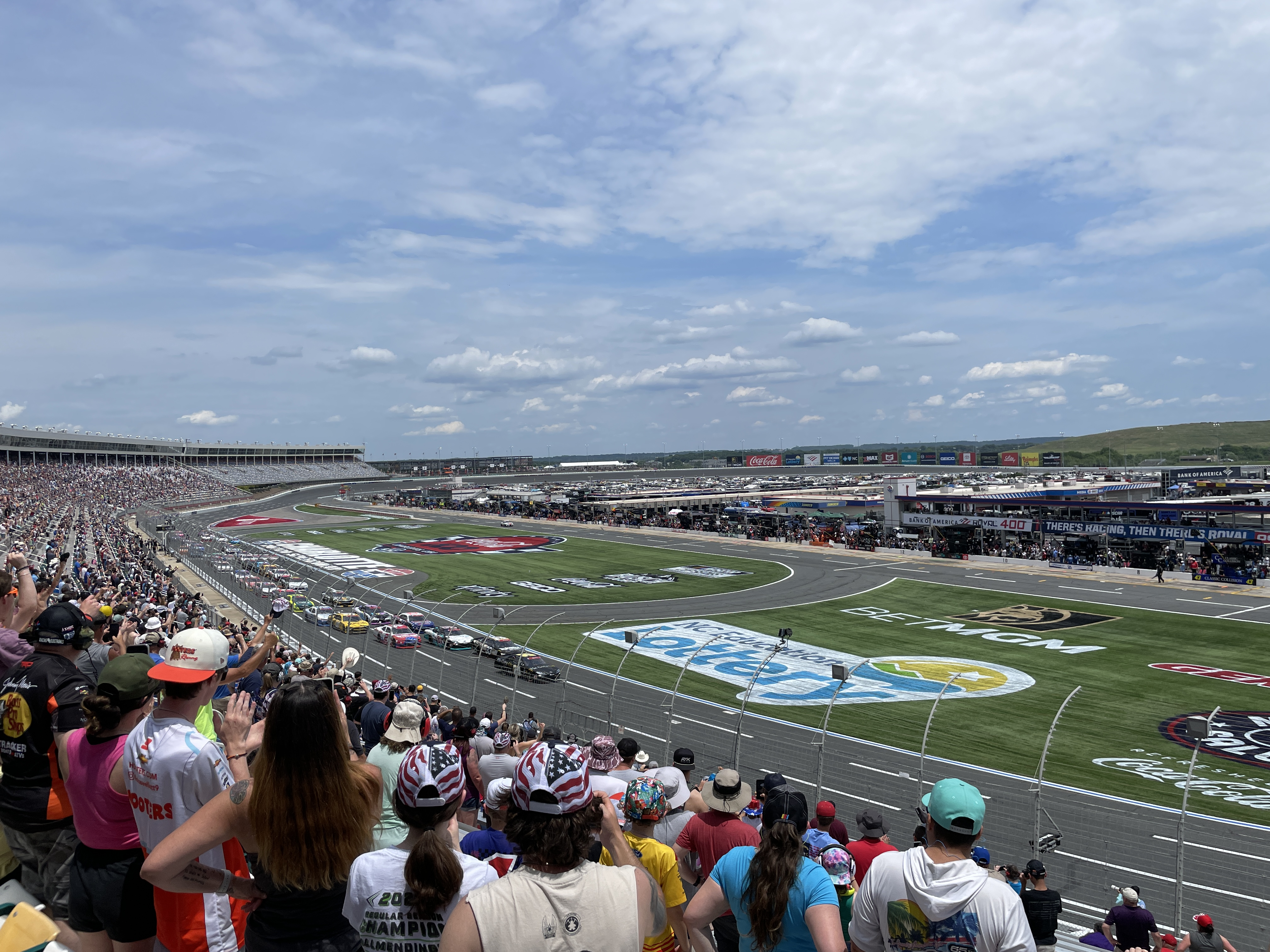
2024 BetMGM 300

In 2024, BetMGM, a sports betting and online gaming platform jointly owned by MGM Resorts International and Entain, became the new title sponsor of the race.

In 2026, Charbroil took over the naming rights for the event.

=== Past winners ===
Year	Date	No.	Driver	Team	Manufacturer	Race Distance		Race Time	Average Speed (mph)	Report	Ref
Year	Date	No.	Driver	Team	Manufacturer	Laps	Miles (km)	Race Time	Average Speed (mph)	Report	Ref
1982	May 29	77	Harry Gant	Harry Gant	Pontiac	200	300 (482.803)	2:22:02	126.731	Report	
1983	May 28	15	Dale Earnhardt	Robert Gee	Pontiac	200	300 (482.803)	2:32:54	117.724	Report	
1984	May 26	22	Bobby Allison	Frank Plessinger	Oldsmobile	200	300 (482.803)	2:22:38	126.198	Report	
1985	May 25	15	Tim Richmond	Hendrick Motorsports	Pontiac	200	300 (482.803)	2:30:54	119.284	Report	
1986	May 24	15	Tim Richmond	Hendrick Motorsports	Pontiac	200	300 (482.803)	2:08:50	139.715	Report	
1987	May 23	7	Harry Gant	Whitaker Racing	Buick	200	300 (482.803)	2:08:54	139.643	Report	
1988	May 28	32	Dale Jarrett	Horace Isenhower	Oldsmobile	200	300 (482.803)	2:08:36	139.969	Report	
1989	May 27	25	Rob Moroso	Dick Moroso	Oldsmobile	200	300 (482.803)	2:11:55	136.45	Report	
1990	May 26	32	Dale Jarrett	Horace Isenhower	Pontiac	200	300 (482.803)	2:16:01	132.337	Report	
1991	May 25	3	Dale Earnhardt	Dale Earnhardt, Inc.	Chevrolet	200	300 (482.803)	2:15:06	133.235	Report	
1992	May 23	1	Jeff Gordon	Bill Davis Racing	Ford	200	300 (482.803)	2:21:31	127.207	Report	
1993	May 29	30	Michael Waltrip	Bahari Racing	Pontiac	200	300 (482.803)	2:21:08	127.539	Report	
1994	May 28	29	Phil Parsons	Phil Parsons Racing	Chevrolet	200	300 (482.803)	2:20:57	127.704	Report	
1995	May 27	23	Chad Little	Mark Rypien Motorsports	Ford	200	300 (482.803)	2:16:40	131.707	Report	
1996	May 25	60	Mark Martin	Roush Racing	Ford	200	300 (482.803)	1:55:32	155.799	Report	
1997	May 24	87	Joe Nemechek	NEMCO Motorsports	Chevrolet	200	300 (482.803)	2:21:47	126.954	Report	
1998	May 23	60	Mark Martin	Roush Racing	Ford	200	300 (482.803)	2:14:53	133.449	Report	
1999	May 29	60	Mark Martin	Roush Racing	Ford	200	300 (482.803)	2:30:47	119.377	Report	
2000	May 27	9	Jeff Burton	Roush Racing	Ford	200	300 (482.803)	2:27:50	121.759	Report	
2001	May 26	10	Jeff Green	ppc Racing	Ford	200	300 (482.803)	2:20:24	128.205	Report	
2002	May 25	21	Jeff Green	Richard Childress Racing	Chevrolet	200	300 (482.803)	2:29:09	120.684	Report	
2003	May 24	17	Matt Kenseth	Reiser Enterprises	Ford	200	300 (482.803)	2:10:09	138.302	Report	
2004	May 29	5	Kyle Busch	Hendrick Motorsports	Chevrolet	200	300 (482.803)	2:37:31	114.275	Report	
2005	May 28	5	Kyle Busch	Hendrick Motorsports	Chevrolet	200	300 (482.803)	2:32:35	117.968	Report	
2006	May 27	60	Carl Edwards	Roush Racing	Ford	200	300 (482.803)	2:42:33	110.735	Report	
2007	May 26	9	Kasey Kahne	Evernham Motorsports	Dodge	200	300 (482.803)	2:16:07	132.24	Report	
2008	May 24	32	Kyle Busch	Braun Racing	Toyota	202*	303 (487.631)	2:31:05	120.331	Report	
2009	May 23	1	Mike Bliss	Phoenix Racing	Chevrolet	170*	255 (410.382)	1:58:31	129.096	Report	
2010	May 29	18	Kyle Busch	Joe Gibbs Racing	Toyota	203*	304.5 (490.045)	2:18:11	132.216	Report	
2011	May 28	16	Matt Kenseth	Roush Fenway Racing	Ford	200	300 (482.803)	2:11:44	136.64	Report	
2012	May 26	22	Brad Keselowski	Penske Racing	Dodge	200	300 (482.803)	2:25:51	123.414	Report	
2013	May 25	54	Kyle Busch	Joe Gibbs Racing	Toyota	200	300 (482.803)	2:18:33	129.917	Report	
2014	May 24	42	Kyle Larson	Turner Scott Motorsports	Chevrolet	200	300 (482.803)	2:00:11	149.771	Report	
2015	May 23	33	Austin Dillon	Richard Childress Racing	Chevrolet	200	300 (482.803)	2:08:44	139.824	Report	
2016	May 28	18	Denny Hamlin	Joe Gibbs Racing	Toyota	206*	309 (497.287)	2:41:54	114.515	Report	
2017	May 27	12	Ryan Blaney	Team Penske	Ford	200	300 (482.803)	2:38:17	113.72	Report	
2018	May 26	22	Brad Keselowski	Team Penske	Ford	204*	306 (492.459)	2:49:04	108.596	Report	
2019	May 25	2	Tyler Reddick	Richard Childress Racing	Chevrolet	200	300 (482.803)	2:42:37	110.69	Report	
2020	May 25	54	Kyle Busch	Joe Gibbs Racing	Toyota	203*	304.5 (490.045)	2:43:30	111.743	Report	
2021	May 29	54	Ty Gibbs	Joe Gibbs Racing	Toyota	200	300 (482.803)	2:39:57	112.535	Report	
2022	May 28	8	Josh Berry	JR Motorsports	Chevrolet	200	300 (482.803)	2:33:07	117.557	Report	
2023	May 29*	7	Justin Allgaier	JR Motorsports	Chevrolet	200	300 (482.803)	2:26:54	122.532	Report	
2024	May 25	17	Chase Elliott	Hendrick Motorsports	Chevrolet	200	300 (482.803)	2:36:27	115.053	Report	
2025	May 24	17	William Byron	Hendrick Motorsports	Chevrolet	205*	307.5 (494.873)	2:47:21	110.248	Report	
2026	May 23	9	Ross Chastain	JR Motorsports	Chevrolet	91*	136.5 (219.675)	1:52:52	159.48	Report	
2027	May 29									Report	

- 2008, 2010, 2016, 2018, 2020 and 2025: Race extended due to an overtime finish.
- 2009 and 2026: Race shortened due to rain.
- 2020: Race postponed from May 23 to May 25 due to the COVID-19 pandemic.
- 2023: Race postponed from May 27 to May 29 due to rain.

==== Multiple winners (drivers) ====
# Wins	Driver	Years won
6	Kyle Busch	2004-2005, 2008, 2010, 2013, 2020
3	Mark Martin	1996, 1998-1999
2	Morgan Shepherd	1978, 1981
2	Harry Gant	1982, 1987
2	Dale Earnhardt	1983, 1991
2	Tim Richmond	1985-1986
2	Dale Jarrett	1988, 1990
2	Jeff Green	2001-2002
2	Matt Kenseth	2003, 2011
2	Brad Keselowski	2012, 2018

==== Multiple winners (teams) ====
# Wins	Team	Years won
6	Roush Fenway Racing	1996, 1998-2000, 2006, 2011
6	Hendrick Motorsports	1985-1986, 2004-2005, 2024-2025
5	Joe Gibbs Racing	2010, 2013, 2016, 2020-2021
3	Team Penske	2012, 2017-2018
3	Richard Childress Racing	2002, 2015, 2019
3	JR Motorsports	2022-2023, 2026
2	Horace Isenhower	1988, 1990

==== Manufacturer wins ====
# Wins	Make	Years won
16	(United States) Chevrolet	1979, 1991, 1994, 1997, 2002, 2004-2005, 2009, 2014-2015, 2019, 2022-2026
12	(United States) Ford	1992, 1995-1996, 1998-2001, 2003, 2006, 2011, 2017-2018
9	(United States) Pontiac	1978, 1980-1983, 1985-1986, 1990, 1993
6	(Japan) Toyota	2008, 2010, 2013, 2016, 2020-2021
3	(United States) Oldsmobile	1984, 1988-1989
2	(United States) Dodge	2007, 2012
1	(United States) Buick	1987

== Fall race (oval) ==
Blue Cross NC 300
- Corporate sponsor: Blue Cross and Blue Shield of North Carolina
- First race: 1982
- Distance: 300 miles (480 km)
- Laps: 200; Stages 1/2: 45 each Final stage: 110
- Previous names: Miller Time 300 (1982–1984); Miller 400 (1985); All Pro 300 (1986–1994); All Pro Bumper to Bumper 300 (1995–2000); Little Trees 300 (2001–2003); Lowe's Presents the SpongeBob SquarePants Movie 300 (2004); Dollar General 300 (2005–2010, 2012–2013); Dollar General 300 Miles of Courage (2011); Drive for the Cure 300 presented by Blue Cross and Blue Shield of North Carolina (2014–2017)
- Most wins (driver): Darrell Waltrip (4)
- Most wins (team): Roush Fenway Racing (6)
- Most wins (manufacturer): Chevrolet (17)

The Blue Cross NC 300 is a NASCAR O'Reilly Auto Parts Series stock car race that takes place at Charlotte Motor Speedway in Concord, North Carolina during the weekend of the NASCAR Cup Series' Bank of America 400.

Corey Day is the defending race winner, having won the event in 2026.

=== History ===
To go along with the spring race, the track hosted two events. The 1985 race was extended to 400.5 miles (644.5 km), which stands as the longest race distance run in O'Reilly Auto Parts Series history.

In 2018, the race was moved from the oval to their "Roval" infield road course configuration.

The race returned to the oval in 2026.

=== Past winners ===
Year	Date	No.	Driver	Team	Manufacturer	Race Distance		Race Time	Average Speed (mph)	Report	Ref
Year	Date	No.	Driver	Team	Manufacturer	Laps	Miles (km)	Race Time	Average Speed (mph)	Report	Ref
1982	October 9	17	Darrell Waltrip	DarWal, Inc.	Pontiac	200	300 (482.803)	2:25:46	123.485	Report	
1983	October 8	00	Sam Ard	Thomas Brothers Racing	Oldsmobile	200	300 (482.803)	2:07:25	141.269	Report	
1984	October 6	17	Darrell Waltrip	DarWal, Inc.	Pontiac	200	300 (482.803)	2:26:45	123.499	Report	
1985	October 5	17	Terry Labonte	DarWal, Inc.	Pontiac	267	400.5 (644.542)	2:51:03	140.485	Report	
1986	October 4	8	Dale Earnhardt	Dale Earnhardt, Inc.	Pontiac	200	300 (482.803)	2:09:07	138.746	Report	
1987	October 10	7	Harry Gant	Whitaker Racing	Buick	200	300 (482.803)	2:16:30	131.868	Report	
1988	October 8	25	Rob Moroso	Dick Moroso	Oldsmobile	200	300 (482.803)	2:25:32	123.683	Report	
1989	October 7	25	Rob Moroso	Dick Moroso	Oldsmobile	200	300 (482.803)	2:22:49	126.035	Report	
1990	October 6	48	Sterling Marlin	Fred Turner	Oldsmobile	200	300 (482.803)	2:16:05	132.272	Report	
1991	October 5	7	Harry Gant	Whitaker Racing	Buick	200	300 (482.803)	2:27:37	121.937	Report	
1992	October 10	1	Jeff Gordon	Bill Davis Racing	Ford	200	300 (482.803)	2:28:49	120.954	Report	
1993	October 9	60	Mark Martin	Roush Racing	Ford	200	300 (482.803)	2:37:37	113.96	Report	
1994	October 8	14	Terry Labonte	Labonte Motorsports	Chevrolet	200	300 (482.803)	2:13:30	134.831	Report	
1995	October 7	60	Mark Martin	Roush Racing	Ford	200	300 (482.803)	2:11:57	136.415	Report	
1996	October 5	60	Mark Martin	Roush Racing	Ford	200	300 (482.803)	2:24:03	124.957	Report	
1997	October 4	20	Jimmy Spencer	Crestinger Racing	Chevrolet	200	300 (482.803)	2:21:38	127.089	Report	
1998	October 3	34	Mike McLaughlin	Team 34	Chevrolet	200	300 (482.803)	2:03:49	145.376	Report	
1999	October 9	21	Michael Waltrip	Michael Waltrip Racing	Chevrolet	200	300 (482.803)	2:15:06	133.235	Report	
2000	October 7	17	Matt Kenseth	Reiser Enterprises	Chevrolet	200	300 (482.803)	2:04:05	145.064	Report	
2001	October 6	60	Greg Biffle	Roush Racing	Ford	200	300 (482.803)	2:09:05	139.445	Report	
2002	October 12	9	Jeff Burton	Roush Racing	Ford	200	300 (482.803)	2:06:22	142.443	Report	
2003	October 11*	7	Greg Biffle	Evans Motorsports	Chevrolet	200	300 (482.803)	2:01:09	148.576	Report	
2004	October 15	20	Mike Bliss	Joe Gibbs Racing	Chevrolet	200	300 (482.803)	2:43:21	110.193	Report	
2005	October 14	39	Ryan Newman	Penske Racing	Dodge	200	300 (482.803)	2:55:36	102.506	Report	
2006	October 13	32	Dave Blaney	Braun Racing	Chevrolet	203*	304.5 (490.045)	2:50:45	106.999	Report	
2007	October 12	29	Jeff Burton	Richard Childress Racing	Chevrolet	200	300 (482.803)	2:29:40	120.267	Report	
2008	October 10	18	Kyle Busch	Joe Gibbs Racing	Toyota	200	300 (482.803)	2:53:40	103.647	Report	
2009	October 16	18	Kyle Busch	Joe Gibbs Racing	Toyota	200	300 (482.803)	2:19:41	128.863	Report	
2010	October 15	22	Brad Keselowski	Penske Racing	Dodge	200	300 (482.803)	2:23:16	125.64	Report	
2011	October 14	60	Carl Edwards	Roush Fenway Racing	Ford	200	300 (482.803)	2:14:08	134.195	Report	
2012	October 12	20	Joey Logano	Joe Gibbs Racing	Toyota	200	300 (482.803)	2:10:07	138.337	Report	
2013	October 11	54	Kyle Busch	Joe Gibbs Racing	Toyota	200	300 (482.803)	2:14:53	133.449	Report	
2014	October 10	22	Brad Keselowski	Team Penske	Ford	200	300 (482.803)	2:27:20	122.172	Report	
2015	October 9	33	Austin Dillon	Richard Childress Racing	Chevrolet	200	300 (482.803)	1:58:24	152.027	Report	
2016	October 9*	12	Joey Logano	Team Penske	Ford	200	300 (482.803)	2:05:23	143.56	Report	
2017	October 7	42	Alex Bowman	Chip Ganassi Racing	Chevrolet	200	300 (482.803)	2:26:43	122.685	Report	
2018 – 2025	Not held										
2026	October 11*	17	Corey Day	Hendrick Motorsports	Chevrolet	200	300 (482.803)	2:28:11	121.471	Report	
2027	October 16									Report	

- 2003: Race postponed from Friday to Saturday due to rain.
- 2006: Races extended due to NASCAR overtime.
- 2016: Race postponed from Friday to Sunday afternoon due to rain.
- 2026 Race postponed from Saturday to Sunday night due to rain.

==== Multiple winners (drivers) ====
# Wins	Driver	Years won
4	Darrell Waltrip	1977, 1979, 1982, 1984
3	Bobby Allison	1973, 1974, 1978
3	Mark Martin	1993, 1995, 1996
3	Kyle Busch	2008, 2009, 2013
2	Ray Hendrick	1975, 1976
2	Rob Moroso	1988, 1989
2	Harry Gant	1987, 1991
2	Terry Labonte	1985, 1994
2	Greg Biffle	2001, 2003
2	Jeff Burton	2002, 2007
2	Brad Keselowski	2010, 2014
2	Joey Logano	2012, 2016

==== Multiple winners (teams) ====
# Wins	Team	Years won
6	Roush Fenway Racing	1993, 1995, 1996, 2001, 2002, 2011
5	Joe Gibbs Racing	2004, 2008, 2009, 2012, 2013
4	Team Penske	2005, 2010, 2014, 2016
3	DarWal, Inc.	1982, 1984, 1985
2	Whitaker Racing	1987, 1991
2	Dick Moroso	1988, 1989
2	Richard Childress Racing	2007, 2015

==== Manufacturer wins ====
# Wins	Make	Years won
17	(United States) Chevrolet	1973–1977, 1994, 1997–2000, 2003, 2004, 2006, 2007, 2015, 2017, 2026
9	(United States) Ford	1992, 1993, 1995, 1996, 2001, 2002, 2011, 2014, 2016
7	(United States) Pontiac	1979–1982, 1984–1986
4	(United States) Oldsmobile	1983, 1988–1990
4	(Japan) Toyota	2008, 2009, 2012, 2013
2	(United States) Buick	1987, 1991
2	(United States) Dodge	2005, 2010
1	(United States) AMC	1978

== Former Fall race (ROVAL) ==
Blue Cross NC 250
- Corporate sponsor: Blue Cross and Blue Shield of North Carolina
- First race: 2018
- Last race: 2025
- Distance: 159.6 mi (256.851 km)
- Laps: 67; Stage 1/2: 20; Stages 3: 28
- Previous names: Drive for the Cure 200 (2018); Drive for the Cure 250 (2019–2024)
- Most wins (driver): A. J. Allmendinger (4)
- Most wins (team): Kaulig Racing (4)
- Most wins (manufacturer): Chevrolet (7)

The Blue Cross NC 250 was a NASCAR Xfinity Series stock car race that takes place at Charlotte Motor Speedway in Concord, North Carolina during the weekend of the NASCAR Cup Series' Bank of America Roval 400 in the playoffs.

Connor Zilisch was the last race winner of the event, having won it in 2025.

=== History ===
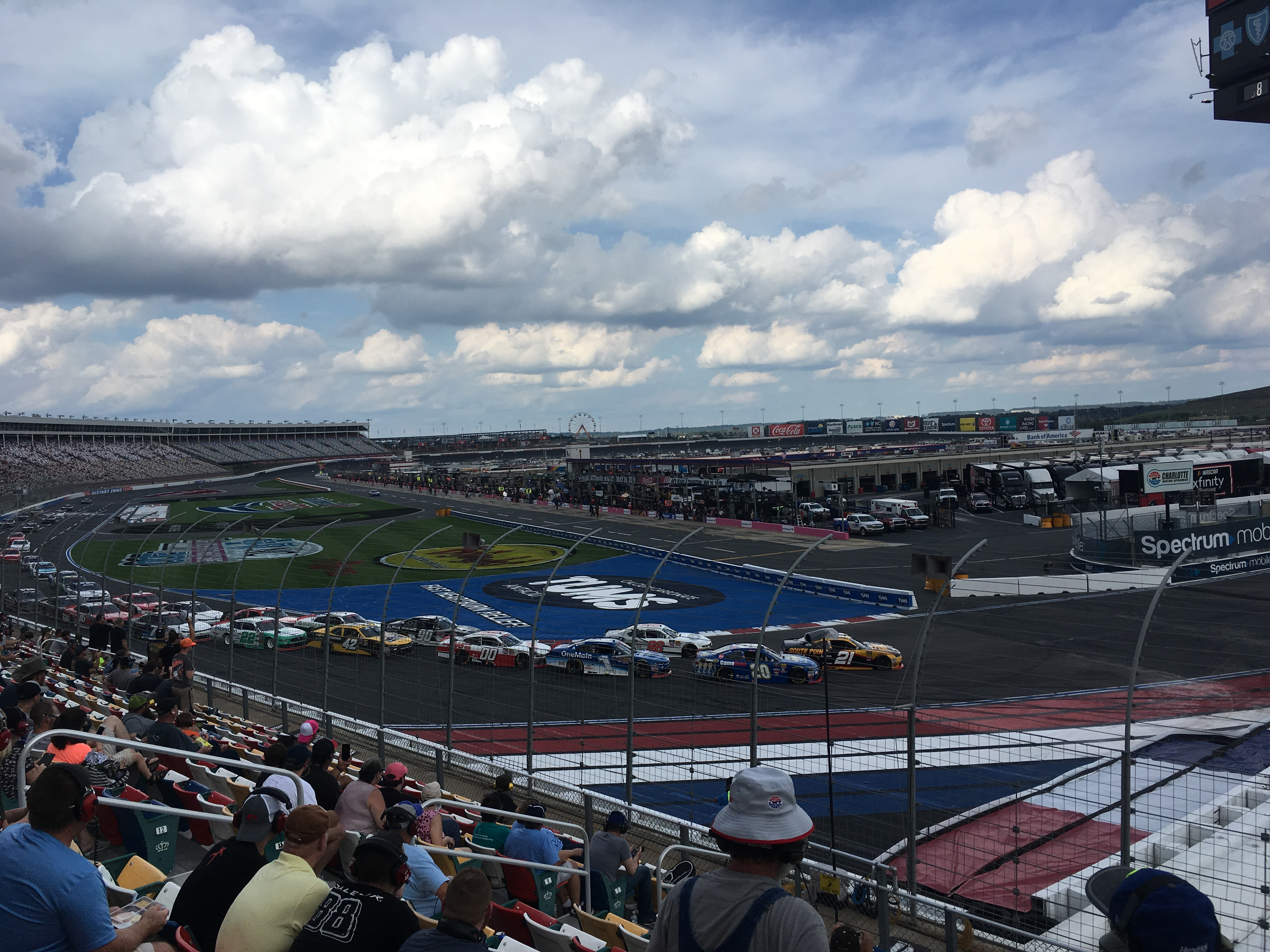
The 2018 Drive for the Cure 200, the first race held on the road course configuration

In 2018, the fall race from the oval was shifted to run the "roval" infield road course configuration of Charlotte. It would also move up a week on the Xfinity Series schedule, the middle race of the first round of the playoffs. Chase Briscoe became the first Xfinity Series driver to win the race in its Roval configuration. The next year, the race was increased to 67 laps and 250 km (155.34 mi), with a name change, the Drive for the Cure 250.

In 2025, the race encountered another name change, the Blue Cross NC 250.

For 2026, the race was to be planned to be 70 laps but on February 3, the roval weekend was move back to the oval for all three series'.

=== Past winners ===
Year	Date	No.	Driver	Team	Manufacturer	Race Distance		Race Time	Average Speed (mph)	Report	Ref
Year	Date	No.	Driver	Team	Manufacturer	Laps	Miles (km)	Race Time	Average Speed (mph)	Report	Ref
2018	September 29	98	Chase Briscoe	Stewart–Haas Racing with Biagi–DenBeste	Ford	55	125.4 (201.812)	1:32:35	81.267	Report	
2019	September 28	10	A. J. Allmendinger	Kaulig Racing	Chevrolet	67	155.34 (249.996)	2:06:30	73.726	Report	
2020	October 10	16	A. J. Allmendinger	Kaulig Racing	Chevrolet	68*	157.76 (253.890)	2:43:05	58.041	Report	
2021	October 9	16	A. J. Allmendinger	Kaulig Racing	Chevrolet	68*	157.76 (253.890)	2:07:14	74.396	Report	
2022	October 8	16	A. J. Allmendinger	Kaulig Racing	Chevrolet	72*	164.16 (264.525)	2:21:37	70.771	Report	
2023	October 7	1	Sam Mayer	JR Motorsports	Chevrolet	67	155.34 (249.996)	2:00:31	77.387	Report	
2024	October 12	1	Sam Mayer	JR Motorsports	Chevrolet	72*	164.16 (264.525)	2:28:35	66.290	Report	
2025	October 4	88	Connor Zilisch	JR Motorsports	Chevrolet	68*	157.76 (253.890)	2:08:05	72.628	Report	

- 2020–2022, 2024–2025: Races extended due to NASCAR overtime.

==== Multiple winners (drivers) ====
# Wins	Driver	Years won
4	A. J. Allmendinger	2019–2022
2	Sam Mayer	2023, 2024

==== Multiple winners (teams) ====
# Wins	Team	Years won
4	Kaulig Racing	2019–2022
3	JR Motorsports	2023-2025

==== Manufacturer wins ====
# Wins	Make	Years won
7	(United States) Chevrolet	2019–2025
1	(United States) Ford	2018

Previous race: TBA	NASCAR O'Reilly Auto Parts Series; Charbroil 300	Next race: Sports Illustrated Resorts 250

Previous race: Focused Health 302	NASCAR O'Reilly Auto Parts Series; Blue Cross NC 300	Next race: Timberland PRO 200
