= 2016 Heads Up Georgia 250 =

2nd race of the 2016 NASCAR Xfinity Series

Race details
- Race 2 of 33 in the 2016 NASCAR Xfinity Series
- Date: February 27, 2016
- Official name: 25th annual Heads Up Georgia 250
- Location: Hampton, Georgia, Atlanta Motor Speedway
- Course: Permanent racing facility
- Course length: 1.54 miles (2.48 km)
- Distance: 163 laps, 251.02 mi (403.98 km)
- Scheduled distance: 163 laps, 251.02 mi (403.98 km)
- Average speed: 137.065 miles per hour (220.585 km/h)

Pole position
Driver	Kyle Busch	Joe Gibbs Racing
- Time: 29.887

Most laps led
Driver	Kyle Busch	Joe Gibbs Racing
- Laps: 119

Winner
No. 18	Kyle Busch	Joe Gibbs Racing

Television in the United States
- Network: FS1
- Announcers: Adam Alexander, Clint Bowyer, and Michael Waltrip

Radio in the United States
- Radio: Performance Racing Network

The 2016 Heads Up Georgia 250 was the 2nd stock car race of the 2016 NASCAR Xfinity Series season and the 25th iteration of the event. The race was held on Saturday, February 27, 2016, in Hampton, Georgia, at Atlanta Motor Speedway a 1.54 miles (2.48 km) permanent asphalt quad-oval intermediate speedway. The race took the scheduled 163 laps to complete. Kyle Busch, driving for Joe Gibbs Racing led a dominating 119 laps, holding off Kyle Larson late to earn his 77th career NASCAR Xfinity Series win and his first of the season. To fill out the podium, Larson of Chip Ganassi Racing and Erik Jones of Joe Gibbs Racing would finish second and third, respectively.

== Background ==
Atlanta Motor Speedway (formerly Atlanta International Raceway) is a track in Hampton, Georgia, 20 miles (32 km) south of Atlanta. It is a 1.54-mile (2.48 km) quad-oval track with a seating capacity of 111,000. It opened in 1960 as a 1.5-mile (2.4 km) standard oval. In 1994, 46 condominiums were built over the northeastern side of the track. In 1997, to standardize the track with Speedway Motorsports' other two 1.5-mile (2.4 km) ovals, the entire track was almost completely rebuilt. The frontstretch and backstretch were swapped, and the configuration of the track was changed from oval to quad-oval. The project made the track one of the fastest on the NASCAR circuit.

=== Entry list ===
- (R) denotes rookie driver.
- (i) denotes driver who is ineligible for series driver points.

#	Driver	Team	Make
0	Garrett Smithley	JD Motorsports	Chevrolet
1	Elliott Sadler	JR Motorsports	Chevrolet
01	Ryan Preece (R)	JD Motorsports	Chevrolet
2	Paul Menard (i)	Richard Childress Racing	Chevrolet
3	Ty Dillon	Richard Childress Racing	Chevrolet
4	Ross Chastain	JD Motorsports	Chevrolet
6	Bubba Wallace	Roush Fenway Racing	Ford
7	Justin Allgaier	JR Motorsports	Chevrolet
07	Ray Black Jr. (R)	SS-Green Light Racing	Chevrolet
10	Jeff Green	TriStar Motorsports	Toyota
11	Blake Koch	Kaulig Racing	Chevrolet
13	Josh Reaume	MBM Motorsports	Dodge
14	J. J. Yeley	TriStar Motorsports	Toyota
15	Cody Ware	Rick Ware Racing	Chevrolet
16	Ryan Reed	Roush Fenway Racing	Ford
18	Kyle Busch (i)	Joe Gibbs Racing	Toyota
19	Daniel Suárez	Joe Gibbs Racing	Toyota
20	Erik Jones (R)	Joe Gibbs Racing	Toyota
22	Brad Keselowski (i)	Team Penske	Ford
24	Corey LaJoie	JGL Racing	Toyota
25	Chris Cockrum	Chris Cockrum Racing	Chevrolet
28	Dakoda Armstrong	JGL Racing	Toyota
33	Brandon Jones (R)	Richard Childress Racing	Chevrolet
39	Ryan Sieg	RSS Racing	Chevrolet
40	Carl Long	MBM Motorsports	Toyota
42	Kyle Larson (i)	Chip Ganassi Racing	Chevrolet
43	Jeb Burton	Richard Petty Motorsports	Ford
44	David Starr	TriStar Motorsports	Toyota
48	Brennan Poole (R)	Chip Ganassi Racing	Chevrolet
51	Jeremy Clements	Jeremy Clements Racing	Chevrolet
52	Joey Gase	Jimmy Means Racing	Chevrolet
62	Brendan Gaughan	Richard Childress Racing	Chevrolet
70	Derrike Cope	Derrike Cope Racing	Chevrolet
74	Mike Harmon	Mike Harmon Racing	Dodge
78	B. J. McLeod (R)	B. J. McLeod Motorsports	Ford
88	Kevin Harvick (i)	JR Motorsports	Chevrolet
89	Morgan Shepherd	Shepherd Racing Ventures	Chevrolet
90	Mario Gosselin	King Autosport	Chevrolet
97	Harrison Rhodes	Obaika Racing	Chevrolet
99	Todd Peck	B. J. McLeod Motorsports	Ford
Official entry list

== Practice ==
=== First practice ===
The first practice session was held on Friday, February 26 at 9:00 AM EST. Erik Jones of Joe Gibbs Racing would set the fastest time in the session, with a lap of 30.236 and an average speed of 183.358 mph (295.086 km/h).

Pos.	#	Driver	Team	Make	Time	Speed
1	20	Erik Jones (R)	Joe Gibbs Racing	Toyota	30.236	183.358
2	16	Ryan Reed	Roush Fenway Racing	Ford	30.315	182.880
3	11	Blake Koch	Kaulig Racing	Chevrolet	30.377	182.507
Full first practice results

=== Second practice ===
The second practice session was held on Friday, February 26 at 12:30 PM EST. Daniel Suárez of Joe Gibbs Racing would set the fastest time in the session, with a lap of 30.478 and an average speed of 181.902 mph (292.743 km/h).

Pos.	#	Driver	Team	Make	Time	Speed
1	19	Daniel Suárez	Joe Gibbs Racing	Toyota	30.478	181.902
2	20	Erik Jones (R)	Joe Gibbs Racing	Toyota	30.634	180.975
3	62	Brendan Gaughan	Richard Childress Racing	Chevrolet	30.659	180.828
Full first practice results

=== Third and final practice ===
The final practice session, sometimes referred to as Happy Hour, was held on Friday, February 26, at 3:00 PM EST. Erik Jones of Joe Gibbs Racing would set the fastest time in the session, with a lap of 30.551 and an average speed of 181.467 mph (292.043 km/h).

Pos.	#	Driver	Team	Make	Time	Speed
1	3	Erik Jones (R)	Joe Gibbs Racing	Toyota	30.551	181.467
2	18	Kyle Busch (i)	Joe Gibbs Racing	Toyota	30.641	180.934
3	3	Ty Dillon	Richard Childress Racing	Chevrolet	30.718	180.481
Full Happy Hour practice results

== Qualifying ==
Qualifying was held on Saturday, February 20, at 8:30 AM EST. Since Atlanta Motor Speedway is under 2 miles (3.2 km), the qualifying system was a multi-car system that included three rounds. The first round was 15 minutes, where every driver would be able to set a lap within the 15 minutes. Then, the second round would consist of the fastest 24 cars in Round 1, and drivers would have 10 minutes to set a lap. Round 3 consisted of the fastest 12 drivers from Round 2, and the drivers would have 5 minutes to set a time. Whoever was fastest in Round 3 would win the pole.

Kyle Busch of Joe Gibbs Racing would win the pole after advancing from the preliminary round and setting the fastest lap in Round 3, with a time of 29.887 and an average speed of 185.499 mph (298.532 km/h).

Nobody failed to qualify.

=== Full qualifying results ===
Pos.	#	Driver	Team	Make	Time (R1)	Speed (R1)	Time (R2)	Speed (R2)	Time (R3)	Speed (R3)
1	18	Kyle Busch (i)	Joe Gibbs Racing	Toyota	29.947	185.127	29.190	185.300	29.887	185.499
2	20	Erik Jones (R)	Joe Gibbs Racing	Toyota	30.362	182.597	29.861	185.660	29.955	185.078
3	19	Daniel Suárez	Joe Gibbs Racing	Toyota	30.379	182.494	30.015	184.708	29.964	185.022
4	42	Kyle Larson (i)	Chip Ganassi Racing	Chevrolet	30.080	184.309	29.939	185.177	30.018	184.689
5	48	Brennan Poole (R)	Chip Ganassi Racing	Chevrolet	30.402	182.356	30.154	183.856	30.240	183.333
6	3	Ty Dillon	Richard Childress Racing	Chevrolet	30.264	183.188	30.383	182.470	30.262	183.200
7	22	Brad Keselowski (i)	Team Penske	Ford	30.334	182.765	30.335	182.759	30.311	182.904
8	39	Ryan Sieg	RSS Racing	Chevrolet	30.453	182.051	30.353	182.651	30.339	182.735
9	62	Brendan Gaughan	Richard Childress Racing	Chevrolet	30.529	181.598	30.339	182.735	30.342	182.717
10	88	Kevin Harvick (i)	JR Motorsports	Chevrolet	30.016	184.701	30.314	182.886	30.364	182.585
11	2	Paul Menard (i)	Richard Childress Racing	Chevrolet	30.308	182.922	30.342	182.717	30.437	182.147
12	7	Justin Allgaier	JR Motorsports	Chevrolet	30.383	182.470	30.363	182.591	30.496	181.794
Eliminated in Round 2
13	11	Blake Koch	Kaulig Racing	Chevrolet	30.735	180.381	30.408	182.320	-	-
14	51	Jeremy Clements	Jeremy Clements Racing	Chevrolet	30.372	182.537	30.414	182.284	-	-
15	43	Jeb Burton	Richard Petty Motorsports	Ford	30.142	183.929	30.461	182.003	-	-
16	1	Elliott Sadler	JR Motorsports	Chevrolet	30.369	180.946	30.467	181.967	-	-
17	16	Ryan Reed	Roush Fenway Racing	Ford	30.374	182.525	30.512	181.699	-	-
18	6	Bubba Wallace	Roush Fenway Racing	Ford	30.512	181.699	30.532	181.580	-	-
19	33	Brandon Jones (R)	Richard Childress Racing	Chevrolet	30.580	181.295	30.771	180.170	-	-
20	28	Dakoda Armstrong	JGL Racing	Chevrolet	30.937	179.203	30.970	179.012	-	-
21	01	Ryan Preece	JD Motorsports (R)	Chevrolet	31.136	178.058	31.115	178.178	-	-
22	14	J. J. Yeley	TriStar Motorsports	Toyota	31.125	178.120	31.164	177.898	-	-
23	24	Corey LaJoie	JGL Racing	Toyota	30.776	180.140	31.179	177.812	-	-
24	4	Ross Chastain	JD Motorsports	Chevrolet	30.814	179.918	30.814	179.918	-	-
Eliminated in Round 1
25	97	Harrison Rhodes	Obaika Racing	Chevrolet	31.142	178.023	-	-	-	-
26	0	Garrett Smithley (R)	JD Motorsports	Chevrolet	31.171	177.858	-	-	-	-
27	07	Ray Black Jr.	SS-Green Light Racing	Chevrolet	31.221	177.573	-	-	-	-
28	44	David Starr	TriStar Motorsports	Toyota	31.425	176.420	-	-	-	-
29	78	B. J. McLeod (R)	B. J. McLeod Motorsports	Ford	31.523	175.872	-	-	-	-
30	40	Carl Long	MBM Motorsports	Toyota	31.588	175.510	-	-	-	-
31	10	Jeff Green	TriStar Motorsports	Toyota	31.665	175.083	-	-	-	-
32	90	Mario Gosselin	DGM Racing	Chevrolet	32.002	173.239	-	-	-	-
33	52	Joey Gase	Means Motorsports	Chevrolet	32.208	172.131	-	-	-	-
Qualified by owner's points
34	70	Derrike Cope	Derrike Cope Racing	Chevrolet	32.250	171.907	-	-	-	-
35	99	Todd Peck	B. J. McLeod Motorsports	Ford	32.705	169.515	-	-	-	-
36	74	Mike Harmon	Mike Harmon Racing	Dodge	32.778	169.138	-	-	-	-
37	15	Cody Ware (R)	Rick Ware Racing	Chevrolet	33.323	166.372	-	-	-	-
38	13	Josh Reaume	MBM Motorsports	Dodge	33.490	165.542	-	-		
39	89	Morgan Shepherd	Shepherd Racing Ventures	Chevrolet	33.690	164.559	-	-	-	-
40	25	Chris Cockrum	Chris Cockrum Racing	Chevrolet	0.000	0.000	-	-	-	-
Official qualifying results
Official starting lineup

== Race results ==
Fin	St	#	Driver	Team	Make	Laps	Led	Status	Pts
1	1	18	Kyle Busch (i)	Joe Gibbs Racing	Toyota	163	119	running	0
2	4	42	Kyle Larson (i)	Chip Ganassi Racing	Chevrolet	163	0	running	0
3	2	20	Erik Jones (R)	Joe Gibbs Racing	Toyota	163	0	running	38
4	11	2	Paul Menard (i)	Richard Childress Racing	Chevrolet	163	0	running	0
5	6	3	Ty Dillon	Richard Childress Racing	Chevrolet	163	0	running	36
6	7	22	Brad Keselowski (i)	Team Penske	Ford	163	28	running	0
7	3	19	Daniel Suárez	Joe Gibbs Racing	Toyota	163	0	running	34
8	12	7	Justin Allgaier	JR Motorsports	Chevrolet	163	15	running	34
9	16	1	Elliott Sadler	JR Motorsports	Chevrolet	163	0	running	32
10	15	43	Jeb Burton	Richard Petty Motorsports	Ford	163	1	running	32
11	19	33	Brandon Jones (R)	Richard Childress Racing	Chevrolet	163	0	running	30
12	10	88	Kevin Harvick (i)	JR Motorsports	Chevrolet	162	0	running	0
13	9	62	Brendan Gaughan	Richard Childress Racing	Chevrolet	162	0	running	28
14	5	48	Brennan Poole (R)	Chip Ganassi Racing	Chevrolet	162	0	running	27
15	17	16	Ryan Reed	Roush Fenway Racing	Ford	162	0	running	26
16	8	39	Ryan Sieg	RSS Racing	Chevrolet	162	0	running	25
17	14	51	Jeremy Clements	Jeremy Clements Racing	Chevrolet	162	0	running	24
18	18	6	Bubba Wallace	Roush Fenway Racing	Ford	162	0	running	23
19	22	14	J. J. Yeley	TriStar Motorsports	Toyota	162	0	running	22
20	13	11	Blake Koch	Kaulig Racing	Chevrolet	161	0	running	21
21	20	28	Dakoda Armstrong	JGL Racing	Toyota	160	0	running	20
22	21	01	Ryan Preece (R)	JD Motorsports	Chevrolet	159	0	running	19
23	23	24	Corey LaJoie	JGL Racing	Toyota	159	0	running	18
24	26	0	Garrett Smithley	JD Motorsports	Chevrolet	159	0	running	17
25	32	90	Mario Gosselin	King Autosport	Chevrolet	158	0	running	16
26	29	78	B. J. McLeod (R)	B. J. McLeod Motorsports	Ford	157	0	running	15
27	34	70	Derrike Cope	Derrike Cope Racing	Chevrolet	156	0	running	14
28	24	4	Ross Chastain	JD Motorsports	Chevrolet	152	0	running	13
29	40	25	Chris Cockrum	Chris Cockrum Racing	Chevrolet	152	0	running	12
30	36	74	Mike Harmon	Mike Harmon Racing	Dodge	151	0	running	11
31	37	15	Cody Ware (R)	Rick Ware Racing	Chevrolet	151	0	running	10
32	33	52	Joey Gase	Jimmy Means Racing	Chevrolet	127	0	suspension	9
33	27	07	Ray Black Jr. (R)	SS-Green Light Racing	Chevrolet	113	0	running	8
34	38	13	Josh Reaume	MBM Motorsports	Dodge	87	0	suspension	7
35	25	97	Harrison Rhodes	Obaika Racing	Chevrolet	68	0	rear gear	6
36	30	40	Carl Long	MBM Motorsports	Toyota	29	0	handling	5
37	39	89	Morgan Shepherd	Shepherd Racing Ventures	Chevrolet	25	0	overheating	4
38	35	99	Todd Peck	B. J. McLeod Motorsports	Ford	15	0	engine	3
39	28	44	David Starr	TriStar Motorsports	Toyota	7	0	engine	2
40	31	10	Jeff Green	TriStar Motorsports	Toyota	1	0	electrical	1
Official race results

== Standings after the race ==
Drivers' Championship standings

Pos	Driver	Points
1	Elliott Sadler	70
2	Daniel Suárez	67 (-3)
3	Ty Dillon	65 (–5)
4	Brandon Jones	64 (–6)
5	Justin Allgaier	63 (–7)
6	Brendan Gaughan	60 (-10)
7	Bubba Wallace	58 (-12)
8	Blake Koch	53 (-17)
9	Ryan Reed	51 (-19)
10	Jeremy Clements	50 (-20)
11	Erik Jones (R)	48 (-22)
11	Jeb Burton	48 (-22)
Official driver's standings

- Note: Only the first 12 positions are included for the driver standings.

Previous race: 2016 PowerShares QQQ 300	NASCAR Xfinity Series; 2016 season	Next race: 2016 Boyd Gaming 300
