= 2006 Dollar General 300 =

NASCAR Busch Series race in 2006

Race details
- Map of Speedway
- Date: October 13, 2006
- Official name: 2006 Dollar General 300
- Location: Lowe's Motor Speedway in Concord, North Carolina
- Course: Tri-oval
- Course length: 2.4 km (1.5 miles)
- Distance: 203 laps, 305 mi (490.850 km)
- Scheduled distance: 200 laps, 300 mi (482.803 km)
- Weather: Clear
- Average speed: 106.999 mph (172.198 km/h)
- Attendance: 70,000

Pole position
Driver	Carl Edwards	Roush Racing
- Time: 28.994

Most laps led
Driver	Carl Edwards	Roush Racing
- Laps: 123

Winner
No. 32	Dave Blaney	Braun-Akins Racing

Television in the United States
- Network: TNT
- Announcers: Bill Weber, Wally Dallenbach Jr., Kyle Petty

The 2006 Dollar General 300 was a NASCAR Busch Series race held on Friday October 13, 2006 at Lowe's Motor Speedway in Concord, North Carolina. The race was the 34th iteration of the event. The race was the 31st race of the 2006 NASCAR Busch Series. The race itself was Friday the 13th fashion as Carl Edwards won the pole and led the most laps but he was taken out with just two laps to go racing for the lead with Casey Mears and he handed the win to Dave Blaney who beat a hard charging Matt Kenseth to take home the win.

== Background ==
=== Entry list ===
- (R) denotes rookie driver

#	Driver	Team	Make
00	Johnny Sauter	Haas CNC Racing	Chevrolet
0	Kertus Davis	Davis Motorsports	Chevrolet
01	Jay Sauter	Duesenberg & Leik Motorsports	Chevrolet
1	Mike Wallace	Phoenix Racing	Dodge
2	Clint Bowyer	Richard Childress Racing	Chevrolet
04	Eric McClure	Morgan-McClure Motorsports	Chevrolet
4	Auggie Vidovich	Biagi Brothers Racing	Dodge
5	Kyle Busch	Hendrick Motorsports	Chevrolet
06	Todd Kluever (R)	Roush Racing	Ford
6	David Ragan	Roush Racing	Ford
8	Tony Stewart	Dale Earnhardt Inc.	Chevrolet
9	Kasey Kahne	Evernham Motorsports	Dodge
10	John Andretti (R)	ppc Racing	Ford
11	Paul Menard	Dale Earnhardt Inc.	Chevrolet
12	Mike Skinner	FitzBradshaw Racing	Dodge
14	Ted Musgrave	FitzBradshaw Racing	Dodge
16	Greg Biffle	Roush Racing	Ford
17	Matt Kenseth	Roush Racing	Ford
18	J. J. Yeley	Joe Gibbs Racing	Chevrolet
19	Aric Almirola	Joe Gibbs Racing	Chevrolet
20	Denny Hamlin	Joe Gibbs Racing	Chevrolet
21	Jeff Burton	Richard Childress Racing	Chevrolet
22	Kenny Wallace	ppc Racing	Ford
23	Brad Keselowski	Keith Coleman Racing	Chevrolet
25	Ashton Lewis Jr.	Team Rensi Motorsports	Ford
27	Casey Atwood	Brewco Motorsports	Ford
32	Dave Blaney	Braun-Akins Racing	Chevrolet
33	Kevin Harvick	Kevin Harvick Inc.	Chevrolet
35	Regan Smith	Team Rensi Motorsports	Ford
36	Tim Sauter	McGill Motorsports	Chevrolet
38	Jason Leffler	Braun-Akins Racing	Chevrolet
41	Reed Sorenson	Chip Ganassi Racing	Dodge
42	Casey Mears	Chip Ganassi Racing	Dodge
44	David Reutimann	FitzBradshaw Racing	Dodge
47	Jon Wood	Wood Brothers Racing/JTG Racing	Ford
48	Jimmie Johnson	Hendrick Motorsports	Chevrolet
49	Derrike Cope	Jay Robinson Racing	Ford
50	Danny O'Quinn Jr. (R)	Roush Racing	Ford
59	Stacy Compton	Wood Brothers Racing/JTG Racing	Ford
60	Carl Edwards	Roush Racing	Ford
64	Jamie McMurray	Rusty Wallace Inc.	Dodge
66	Scott Wimmer	Brewco Motorsports	Ford
72	Brad Baker	MacDonald Motorsports	Chevrolet
77	Bobby Labonte	Kevin Harvick Inc.	Chevrolet
80	Robert Richardson Jr.	Richardson Racing	Chevrolet
88	Shane Huffman	JR Motorsports	Chevrolet
90	Stephen Leicht	Robert Yates Racing	Ford
99	Michael Waltrip	Michael Waltrip Racing	Dodge
Official Entry list

== Qualifying ==
Carl Edwards won the pole with a time of 28.994 and a speed of 186.245 mph.

Grid	No.	Driver	Team	Manufacturer	Time	Speed
1	60	Carl Edwards	Roush Racing	Ford	28.994	186.245
2	17	Matt Kenseth	Roush Racing	Ford	29.004	186.181
3	18	J. J. Yeley	Joe Gibbs Racing	Chevrolet	29.038	185.963
4	12	Mike Skinner	FitzBradshaw Racing	Dodge	29.071	185.752
5	42	Casey Mears	Chip Ganassi Racing	Dodge	29.113	185.484
6	11	Paul Menard	Dale Earnhardt Inc.	Chevrolet	29.199	184.937
7	48	Jimmie Johnson	Hendrick Motorsports	Chevrolet	29.206	184.893
8	33	Kevin Harvick	Kevin Harvick Inc.	Chevrolet	29.262	184.539
9	22	Kenny Wallace	ppc Racing	Ford	29.269	184.495
10	6	David Ragan	Roush Racing	Ford	29.288	184.376
11	20	Denny Hamlin	Joe Gibbs Racing	Chevrolet	29.308	184.250
12	64	Jamie McMurray	Rusty Wallace Inc.	Dodge	29.312	184.225
13	90	Stephen Leicht	Robert Yates Racing	Ford	29.342	184.036
14	21	Jeff Burton	Richard Childress Racing	Chevrolet	29.343	184.030
15	9	Kasey Kahne	Evernham Motorsports	Dodge	29.349	183.992
16	35	Regan Smith	Team Rensi Motorsports	Ford	29.371	183.854
17	8	Tony Stewart	Dale Earnhardt Inc.	Chevrolet	29.401	183.667
18	5	Kyle Busch	Hendrick Motorsports	Chevrolet	29.415	183.580
19	77	Bobby Labonte	Kevin Harvick Inc.	Chevrolet	29.420	183.548
20	44	David Reutimann	FitzBradshaw Racing	Dodge	29.491	183.106
21	00	Johnny Sauter	Haas CNC Racing	Chevrolet	29.449	183.057
22	19	Aric Almirola	Joe Gibbs Racing	Chevrolet	29.500	183.050
23	32	Dave Blaney	Braun-Akins Racing	Chevrolet	29.506	183.013
24	2	Clint Bowyer	Richard Childress Racing	Chevrolet	29.508	183.001
25	06	Todd Kluever (R)	Roush Racing	Ford	29.560	182.679
26	4	Auggie Vidovich	Biagi Brothers Racing	Dodge	29.569	182.623
27	88	Shane Huffman	JR Motorsports	Chevrolet	29.597	182.451
28	38	Jason Leffler	Braun-Akins Racing	Chevrolet	29.608	182.383
29	16	Greg Biffle	Roush Racing	Ford	29.639	182.192
30	59	Stacy Compton	Wood Brothers/JTG Racing	Ford	29.651	182.118
31	25	Ashton Lewis	Team Rensi Motorsports	Ford	29.658	182.075
32	23	Brad Keselowski	Keith Coleman Racing	Chevrolet	29.757	181.470
33	66	Scott Wimmer	Brewco Motorsports	Ford	29.784	181.305
34	27	Casey Atwood	Brewco Motorsports	Ford	29.785	181.299
35	14	Ted Musgrave	FitzBradshaw Racing	Dodge	29.790	181.268
36	10	John Andretti (R)	ppc Racing	Ford	29.817	181.104
37	50	Danny O'Quinn Jr. (R)	Roush Racing	Ford	29.827	181.044
38	41	Reed Sorenson	Chip Ganassi Racing	Dodge	29.836	180.989
39	47	Jon Wood	Wood Brothers/JTG Racing	Ford	29.867	180.801
40	01	Jay Sauter	Duesenberg & Leik Motorsports	Chevrolet	29.998	180.012
41	1	Mike Wallace	Phoenix Racing	Dodge	30.069	179.587
42	99	Michael Waltrip**	Michael Waltrip Racing	Dodge	—	—
43	72	Brad Baker*	MacDonald Motorsports	Chevrolet	29.811	181.141
Failed to qualify, withdrew, or driver changes
44	36	Tim Sauter	McGill Motorsports	Chevrolet	29.833	181.007
45	0	Kertus Davis	Davis Motorsports	Chevrolet	30.217	178.707
46	80	Robert Richardson Jr.	Richardson Racing	Chevrolet	30.504	177.026
47	04	Eric McClure	Morgan-McClure Motorsports	Chevrolet	30.506	177.014
48	49	Derrike Cope	Jay Robinson Racing	Ford	30.583	176.568
Official starting grid

* – made the field via owners points.

** – Michael Waltrip had to start at the rear of the field for a backup car.

== Race ==
Pole sitter Carl Edwards led the first lap of the race. The first caution did not take long as it flew on lap 2 for a three car crash in turn 1. It started when David Reutimann was pushing Kasey Kahne and Reutimann bumped Kahne turning Kahne around. Kahne backed into the outside wall and spun down and collected Greg Biffle in the process. Edwards led the field to the restart on lap 7. The second caution flew on lap 14 when Shane Huffman spun all by himself in turn 4 and hit the outside wall drivers side first.

The race would restart on lap 19. On lap 21, the third caution would fly when Jimmie Johnson hit the outside wall in turn 4. The race would restart on lap 28. On lap 35, the fourth caution flew when Jeff Burton's car stalled in turn 3 after the carburetor broke. Carl Edwards won the race off of pit road but many others including Jason Leffler did not pit and Leffler led the field to the restart on lap 40. On lap 46, Matt Kenseth took the lead from Leffler and held the lead for the next 51 laps. On lap 95, the 5th caution flew when Reed Sorenson hit the outside wall in turns 1 and 2 after cutting a right front tire. Carl Edwards won the race off of pit road and he led the field to the restart on lap 102. On lap 103, the 6th caution would fly for the big one that occurred off of turn 4 and collected 10 cars. It started when Tony Stewart and David Reutimann both spun almost simultaneously off of turn 4 and caused a chain reaction crash collecting Mike Wallace, Auggie Vidovich, David Ragan, Mike Skinner, Regan Smith, Stacy Compton, Brad Baker, and Michael Waltrip. The race would restart on lap 113.

On lap 115, the 7th caution would fly for a hard 3 car crash down the backstretch. It started when Auggie Vidovich spun all by himself off of turn 2 and spun down the track and collected Jeff Burton. Both Vidovich and Burton would hit the inside wall but Vidovich would back into the opening where all the safety trucks go hard enough where it shot his car back across the track right in front of the field. Brad Keselowski, making his 4th Busch Series start, went left to avoid Vidovich but his car spun and he hit the inside wall. A red flag was issued the clean up the mess. The red flag was lifted after about 10 minutes and the race restarted on lap 121. On lap 123, the 8th caution would fly when rookie Danny O'Quinn Jr. spun all by himself off of turn 2 and narrowly missed the inside wall.

=== Final laps ===
The race would restart on lap 127. With around 33 laps to go, green flag pit stops began. With 30 laps to go, Carl Edwards handed the lead to Paul Menard as he went to pit. On the next lap, Menard pitted handing the lead to Jamie McMurray. After everything cycled through, Casey Mears was the new race leader. Mears was looking for his second career Busch Series win after he had won at Chicagoland earlier in the year. But with 18 to go, the 9th caution flew when Jamie McMurray crashed in turn 2. The top 2 cars in Mears and Dave Blaney pitted.

During the caution, a controversy ensued. Despite Mears already pitting, Mears was still credited with lead. This made Carl Edwards and his crew upset because they think they should be the leader because Mears had already pitted and Mears should be around the last car on the lead lap which would be around 6th or 7th place and that there was no way he made a legal stop and still be in the lead. Mears' team argued they beat Edwards to the line at the end of pit road which should make them the leader. NASCAR spent 9 caution laps and red flagged the race with 11 to go to check the video to see who was in front when the caution came out. The race was red flagged for six minutes before they eventually said Edwards was the race leader and Mears was in second.

The race restarted with 8 to go. Mears attempted to take the lead from Edwards but couldn't. With 7 to go, the 10th caution flew when Jason Leffler crashed in turn 3. The race restarted with 4 laps to go. Mears was all over the rear bumper of Edwards right away. With 3 to go, Mears attempted to pass Edwards on the outside in turns 3 and 4. Edwards got loose in turn 4 and slid up into Mears. Mears got sideways and turned left and collected Edwards in the process and both hit the outside wall head on ending their chances to win. The wreck also collected Danny O'Quinn Jr.

Eventually, the wreck would end up having Kevin Harvick clinch the Championship by 775 points over Edwards. The race was red flagged for a short bit. Dave Blaney was the new leader with Matt Kenseth right behind as the wreck would set up a green-white-checkered finish. On the restart, Kenseth laid back and got a good run on Blaney. Blaney would overdrive turns 3 and 4 allowing Kenseth to get to Blaney's inside and the two raced hard side by side for the lead. Kenseth beat Blaney to the line to take the white flag. On the last lap, the two kept racing side by side all around the track. It looked like it was going to be a photo finish. But in the middle of turns 3 and 4, Kenseth got loose and spun around and bringing out the 12th and final caution and giving Dave Blaney the win. The race would be Blaney's first and only win in his Busch Series career and would be the second win for owner Todd Braun in the Busch Series. Michael Waltrip, Stacy Compton, Matt Kenseth, and Danny O'Quinn Jr. rounded out the top 5 while Johnny Sauter, Clint Bowyer, Denny Hamlin, Kevin Harvick, and Mike Skinner rounded out the top 10.

== Race results ==
Pos	Car	Driver	Team	Manufacturer	Laps Run	Laps Led	Status	Points
1	32	Dave Blaney	Braun-Akins Racing	Chevrolet	203	5	running	185
2	99	Michael Waltrip	Michael Waltrip Racing	Dodge	203	1	running	175
3	59	Stacy Compton	Wood Brothers/JTG Racing	Ford	203	0	running	165
4	17	Matt Kenseth	Roush Racing	Ford	203	52	running	165
5	50	Danny O'Quinn Jr. (R)	Roush Racing	Ford	203	0	running	155
6	00	Johnny Sauter	Haas CNC Racing	Chevrolet	202	0	running	150
7	2	Clint Bowyer	Richard Childress Racing	Chevrolet	202	0	running	146
8	20	Denny Hamlin	Joe Gibbs Racing	Chevrolet	202	0	running	142
9	33	Kevin Harvick	Kevin Harvick Inc.	Chevrolet	202	0	running	138
10	12	Mike Skinner	FitzBradshaw Racing	Dodge	202	0	running	134
11	25	Ashton Lewis	Team Rensi Motorsports	Ford	202	0	running	130
12	5	Kyle Busch	Hendrick Motorsports	Chevrolet	202	0	running	127
13	11	Paul Menard	Dale Earnhardt Inc.	Chevrolet	201	1	running	129
14	90	Stephen Leicht	Robert Yates Racing	Ford	201	0	running	121
15	19	Aric Almirola	Joe Gibbs Racing	Chevrolet	201	0	running	118
16	8	Tony Stewart	Dale Earnhardt Inc.	Chevrolet	201	0	running	115
17	27	Casey Atwood	Brewco Motorsports	Ford	201	0	running	112
18	06	Todd Kluever (R)	Roush Racing	Ford	201	0	running	109
19	22	Kenny Wallace	ppc Racing	Ford	200	0	running	106
20	44	David Reutimann	FitzBradshaw Racing	Dodge	200	0	running	103
21	66	Scott Wimmer	Brewco Motorsports	Ford	200	0	running	100
22	77	Bobby Labonte	Kevin Harvick Inc.	Chevrolet	200	0	running	97
23	47	Jon Wood	Wood Brothers/JTG Racing	Ford	199	0	running	94
24	14	Ted Musgrave	FitzBradshaw Racing	Dodge	199	0	running	91
25	10	John Andretti (R)	ppc Racing	Ford	199	0	running	88
26	42	Casey Mears	Chip Ganassi Racing	Dodge	198	12	crash	90
27	60	Carl Edwards	Roush Racing	Ford	198	123	crash	92
28	38	Jason Leffler	Braun-Akins Racing	Chevrolet	198	8	crash	84
29	1	Mike Wallace	Phoenix Racing	Dodge	196	0	running	76
30	72	Brad Baker	MacDonald Motorsports	Chevrolet	195	0	running	73
31	64	Jamie McMurray	Rusty Wallace Inc.	Dodge	182	1	crash	75
32	18	J. J. Yeley	Joe Gibbs Racing	Chevrolet	168	0	running	67
33	4	Auggie Vidovich	Biagi Brothers Racing	Dodge	114	0	crash	64
34	23	Brad Keselowski	Keith Coleman Racing	Chevrolet	113	0	crash	61
35	21	Jeff Burton	Richard Childress Racing	Chevrolet	108	0	crash	58
36	6	David Ragan	Roush Racing	Ford	103	0	crash	55
37	35	Regan Smith	Team Rensi Motorsports	Ford	101	0	crash	52
38	41	Reed Sorenson	Chip Ganassi Racing	Dodge	94	0	crash	49
39	88	Shane Huffman	JR Motorsports	Chevrolet	89	0	crash	46
40	01	Jay Sauter	Duesenberg & Leik Motorsports	Chevrolet	72	0	crash	43
41	16	Greg Biffle	Roush Racing	Ford	42	0	crash	40
42	48	Jimmie Johnson	Hendrick Motorsports	Chevrolet	21	0	crash	37
43	9	Kasey Kahne	Evernham Motorsports	Dodge	7	0	crash	34
Official Race results

Previous race: 2006 Yellow Transportation 300	NASCAR Busch Series; 2006 season	Next race: 2006 Sam's Town 250
