= 2008 Carquest Auto Parts 300 =

NASCAR Nationwide Series race in North Carolina, May 24, 2008

Race details
- Map of Speedway
- Date: May 24, 2008
- Official name: 2008 Carquest Auto Parts 300
- Location: Lowe's Motor Speedway in Concord, North Carolina
- Course: Tri-oval
- Course length: 1.5 miles (2.4 km)
- Distance: 202 laps, 303 mi (487.631 km)
- Scheduled distance: 200 laps, 300 mi (482.803 km)
- Weather: Clear
- Average speed: 120.331 mph (193.654 km/h)
- Attendance: 70,000

Pole position
Driver	Brian Vickers	Braun Racing
- Time: 30.016

Most laps led
Driver	Kyle Busch	Braun Racing
- Laps: 86

Winner
No. 32	Kyle Busch	Braun Racing

Television in the United States
- Network: ESPN2
- Announcers: Jerry Punch, Andy Petree, Rusty Wallace

The 2008 Carquest Auto Parts 300 was a NASCAR Nationwide Series race held at Lowe's Motor Speedway in Concord, North Carolina on May 24, 2008. The race was the 31st iteration of the event. It was also the 13th race of the 2008 NASCAR Nationwide Series. Brian Vickers won the pole but it would be Kyle Busch who would dominate the race leading the most laps and ended up winning the race. But the race was most remembered for a post-race fight that occurred in the pit road area between the crew members of Denny Hamlin and Brad Keselowski that started a rivalry between the two drivers for years to come.

== Background ==
Since 2018, deviating from past NASCAR events at Charlotte, the race will utilize a road course configuration of Charlotte Motor Speedway, promoted and trademarked as the "Roval". The course is 2.28 miles (3.67 km) in length and features 17 turns, utilizing the infield road course and portions of the oval track. The race will be contested over a scheduled distance of 109 laps, 400 kilometres (250 mi).

During July 2018 tests on the road course, concerns were raised over drivers "cheating" the backstretch chicane on the course. The chicanes were modified with additional tire barriers and rumble strips in order to encourage drivers to properly drive through them, and NASCAR will enforce drive-through penalties on drivers who illegally "short-cut" parts of the course. The chicanes will not be used during restarts. In the summer of 2019, the bus stop on the backstretch was changed and deepened, becoming a permanent part of the circuit, compared to the previous year where it was improvised.

If a driver fails to legally make the backstretch bus stop, the driver must skip the frontstretch chicane and make a complete stop by the dotted line on the exit before being allowed to continue. A driver who misses the frontstretch chicane must stop before the exit.

=== Entry list ===
- (R) denotes rookie driver

#	Driver	Team	Make
0	Danny Efland	JD Motorsports	Chevrolet
01	Kertus Davis	JD Motorsports	Chevrolet
1	Mike Bliss	Phoenix Racing	Chevrolet
02	Andy Ponstein	Stott Classic Racing	Chevrolet
2	Clint Bowyer	Richard Childress Racing	Chevrolet
4	Derrike Cope	Jay Robinson Racing	Chevrolet
05	Brett Rowe	Day Enterprise Racing	Chevrolet
5	Jimmie Johnson	JR Motorsports	Chevrolet
6	David Ragan	Roush Fenway Racing	Ford
7	Mike Wallace	Germain Racing	Toyota
9	Kasey Kahne	Gillett Evernham Motorsports	Dodge
10	Brian Vickers	Braun Racing	Toyota
11	Jason Keller	CJM Racing	Chevrolet
12	Sam Hornish Jr.	Penske Racing	Dodge
16	Greg Biffle	Roush Fenway Racing	Ford
19	Chase Miller (R)	Gillett Evernham Motorsports	Dodge
20	Denny Hamlin	Joe Gibbs Racing	Toyota
22	Josh Wise	Fitz Motorsports	Dodge
23	Robert Richardson Jr.	R3 Motorsports	Chevrolet
24	Eric McClure	Front Row Motorsports	Chevrolet
25	Bobby Hamilton Jr.	Team Rensi Motorsports	Ford
27	Brad Coleman	Baker Curb Racing	Ford
28	Kenny Wallace	Jay Robinson Racing	Chevrolet
29	Jeff Burton	Richard Childress Racing	Chevrolet
30	Stanton Barrett	SKI Motorsports	Chevrolet
32	Kyle Busch	Braun Racing	Toyota
33	Kevin Harvick	Kevin Harvick Inc.	Chevrolet
37	Burney Lamar	Baker Curb Racing	Ford
38	Jason Leffler	Braun Racing	Toyota
40	Bryan Clauson (R)	Chip Ganassi Racing	Dodge
47	Kelly Bires	JTG Daugherty Racing	Ford
52	Brad Teague	Means Racing	Chevrolet
59	Marcos Ambrose	JTG Daugherty Racing	Ford
60	Carl Edwards	Roush Fenway Racing	Ford
61	Kevin Lepage	Specialty Racing	Ford
64	David Stremme	Rusty Wallace Racing	Chevrolet
66	Steve Wallace	Rusty Wallace Racing	Chevrolet
77	Cale Gale (R)	Kevin Harvick Inc.	Chevrolet
81	Brad Baker	MacDonald Motorsports	Dodge
83	Dale Earnhardt Jr.	JR Motorsports	Chevrolet
84	Carl Long	Elite 2 Racing	Chevrolet
88	Brad Keselowski	JR Motorsports	Chevrolet
89	Morgan Shepherd	Faith Motorsports	Dodge
90	Johnny Chapman	MSRP Motorsports	Chevrolet
91	Kenny Hendrick	MSRP Motorsports	Chevrolet
99	David Reutimann	Michael Waltrip Racing	Toyota
Official Entry list

== Qualifying ==
Brian Vickers won the pole for the race with a time of 30.016 and a speed of 179.904.

Grid	No.	Driver	Team	Manufacturer	Time	Speed
1	10	Brian Vickers	Braun Racing	Toyota	30.016	179.904
2	6	David Ragan	Roush Fenway Racing	Ford	30.085	179.491
3	16	Greg Biffle	Roush Fenway Racing	Ford	30.171	178.980
4	9	Kasey Kahne	Gillett Evernham Motorsports	Dodge	30.190	178.867
5	38	Jason Leffler	Braun Racing	Toyota	30.244	178.548
6	32	Kyle Busch	Braun Racing	Toyota	30.308	178.171
7	60	Carl Edwards	Roush Fenway Racing	Ford	30.329	178.047
8	1	Mike Bliss	Phoenix Racing	Chevrolet	30.335	178.012
9	20	Denny Hamlin	Joe Gibbs Racing	Toyota	30.339	177.989
10	83	Dale Earnhardt Jr.	JR Motorsports	Chevrolet	30.380	177.749
11	29	Jeff Burton	Richard Childress Racing	Chevrolet	30.384	177.725
12	88	Brad Keselowski	JR Motorsports	Chevrolet	30.507	177.009
13	12	Sam Hornish Jr.	Penske Racing	Dodge	30.512	176.980
14	64	David Stremme	Rusty Wallace Racing	Chevrolet	30.595	176.499
15	2	Clint Bowyer	Richard Childress Racing	Chevrolet	30.629	176.304
16	77	Cale Gale (R)	Kevin Harvick Inc.	Chevrolet	30.643	176.223
17	30	Stanton Barrett	SKI Motorsports	Chevrolet	30.671	176.062
18	19	Chase Miller (R)	Gillett Evernham Motorsports	Dodge	30.685	175.982
19	59	Marcos Ambrose	JTG Daugherty Racing	Ford	30.692	175.942
20	40	Bryan Clauson (R)	Chip Ganassi Racing	Dodge	30.729	175.730
21	27	Brad Coleman	Baker Curb Racing	Ford	30.804	175.302
22	5	Jimmie Johnson	JR Motorsports	Chevrolet	30.848	175.052
23	7	Mike Wallace	Germain Racing	Toyota	30.866	174.950
24	99	David Reutimann	Michael Waltrip Racing	Toyota	30.874	174.904
25	11	Jason Keller	CJM Racing	Chevrolet	30.948	174.486
26	0	Danny Efland	JD Motorsports	Chevrolet	31.129	173.472
27	89	Morgan Shepherd**	Faith Motorsports	Dodge	31.147	173.371
28	23	Robert Richardson Jr.	R3 Motorsports	Chevrolet	31.173	173.227
29	91	Kenny Hendrick	MSRP Motorsprots	Chevrolet	31.204	173.055
30	47	Kelly Bires	JTG Daugherty Racing	Ford	31.213	173.005
31	25	Bobby Hamilton Jr.	Team Rensi Motorsports	Ford	31.231	172.905
32	84	Carl Long	Elite 2 Racing	Chevrolet	31.290	172.579
33	81	Brad Baker**	MacDonald Motorsports	Dodge	31.303	172.507
34	61	Kevin Lepage	Specialty Racing	Ford	31.311	172.463
35	22	Josh Wise	Fitz Motorsports	Dodge	31.359	172.199
36	4	Derrike Cope	Jay Robinson Racing	Chevrolet	31.459	171.652
37	01	Kertus Davis	JD Motorsports	Chevrolet	31.582	170.983
38	02	Andy Ponstein	Stott Classic Racing	Chevrolet	31.605	170.859
39	24	Eric McClure	Front Row Motorsports	Chevrolet	31.634	170.702
40	28	Kenny Wallace	Jay Robinson Racing	Chevrolet	31.740	170.132
41	52	Brad Teague	Means Racing	Chevrolet	31.763	170.009
42	33	Kevin Harvick**	Kevin Harvick Inc.	Chevrolet	—	—
43	66	Steve Wallace* **	Rusty Wallace Racing	Chevrolet	—	—
Failed to qualify, withdrew, or driver changes
44	37	Burney Lamar	Baker Curb Racing	Ford	31.946	169.035
45	90	Johnny Chapman	MSRP Motorsports	Chevrolet	—	—
46	05	Brett Rowe	Day Enterprise Racing	Chevrolet	—	—
Official Starting lineup

* – made the field via owners points.

** – Morgan Shepherd, Brad Baker, Kevin Harvick, and Steve Wallace all had to start at the rear of the field. Shepherd and Baker had unapproved impound adjustments while Harvick and Wallace all had to go to backup cars.

== Race ==
Outside pole sitter David Ragan took the lead from pole sitter Brian Vickers and Ragan would lead the first lap. The first caution would fly on lap 4 of the race when Danny Efland crashed in turn 2. The race would restart on lap 9 of the race. On the restart, Kasey Kahne would take the lead from Ragan. On lap 20, Ragan took the lead back from Kahne. On lap 26, the second caution flew when Morgan Shepherd cut a left rear tire and slowed down which occurred right in front of the leaders in Ragan and Kahne. Jason Leffler won the race off of pit road and he led the field to the restart on lap 31. On lap 35, Jimmie Johnson took the lead from Leffler. Leffler attempted to take it back from Johnson on the next lap and got Jimmie loose in turns 3 and 4 but they did not know that Sam Hornish Jr., who was behind those two, had a big run on the outside and Hornish took the lead from Leffler and Johnson on lap 36. On lap 44, Jason Leffler would take the lead. On lap 61, Sam Hornish Jr. spun in turn 2 bringing out the third caution of the race. David Ragan won the race off of pit road and he led the field to the restart on lap 66. Unfortunetly for Hornish, things would go from bad to worse for him as on lap 67, his car got loose off turn 2 and crashed into the outside wall on the backstretch bringing out the 4th caution of the race. The race would restart on lap 72. On lap 76, Kyle Busch would take the lead from Ragan. On lap 80, the 5th caution would fly when Robert Richardson Jr. either got loose or had contact with Bryan Clauson in turn 2 and Richardson would crash into the outside wall. The race would restart on lap 86. On the restart, David Ragan attempted to take the lead from Kyle Busch and led that lap but could not get in front of Busch. On lap 123, the 6th caution would fly when rookie Bryan Clauson crashed in turn 2. Brian Vickers won the race off of pit road and he led the field to the restart on lap 128. On the restart, another rookie would get knocked out of the race when Chase Miller's engine blew and began to lay oil on the track. The 7th caution would fly 3 laps later for the oil.

=== Final laps and post-race fight ===
The race would restart on lap 135. On lap 137, Dale Earnhardt Jr. would take the lead from Brian Vickers. On lap 139, Junior's teammate Brad Keselowski would take the lead from his boss at JR Motorsports. Keselowski was looking for his first Nationwide Series victory in his 47th start. With 41 laps to go on lap 160, the 8th caution would fly when Kasey Kahne and Kelly Bires crashed in turns 3 and 4. Denny Hamlin won the race off of pit road but Kyle Busch, Greg Biffle, and Josh Wise did not pit and Busch led the field to the restart with 35 laps to go. With 26 to go, the 9th caution would fly when Jason Leffler crashed in turn 4 after Steve Wallace got loose under him and made contact. The race would restart with 21 laps to go. But on the next lap, the 10th caution would fly for debris. The race restarted with 16 laps to go. Busch continued to dominate the race after staying out during the 8th caution flag. Busch did have challengers behind him ready to pounce on Busch for the lead in Denny Hamlin, Brad Keselowski, and Dale Earnhardt Jr. Soon, Junior fell back and it was Hamlin and Keselowski looking to challenge Busch for the lead. With 6 laps to go, Denny Hamlin attempted to take the lead from his Cup Series teammate but failed to do so. Soon, Hamlin and Keselowski began to fight hard for second place which allowed Busch to pull away and get Dale Earnhardt Jr. back into contending for the win. But they soon closed back in with around 4 to go. But with 3 to go, the 11th caution would fly when Josh Wise blew a right front tire and hit the wall in turn 3. The wreck would set up an attempt of a green-white-checkered finish. But during the caution period, controversy began to ensue. TV cameras showed Keselowski's left front fender appeared to all of a sudden have damage on it. Replays soon showed Keselowski pulling up to Hamlin's right side when Hamlin's car all of a sudden turned right up into Keselowski giving Keselowski the damage. It appeared to be just an accident on first glance but Dale Earnhardt Jr. did not think so. Hamlin made the contact with Keselowski's car right in front of the owner of the 88 car and JR Motorsports and Junior had his driver's back and decided to send a message to Hamlin after the contact. Junior, who was in 4th, passed Keselowski and pulled up behind Hamlin and bumped into the rear of Hamlin's car giving Hamlin a shot in rear and then pulled up beside Hamlin to let him know he did not like what he saw done to his main car. The damage on Keselowski's car would end up not being as fast for Keselowski as it had an effect on the aerodynamics. On the race restart, Hamlin was all over the rear bumper of Busch and was attempting to set up on what it would look to be a photo finish. But on the last lap, the 12th and final caution would fly when Mike Wallace crashed in turn 1. The caution would mean Kyle Busch is the winner and Hamlin would finish in 2nd. The win would be Busch's 4th of the season and the 15th of his Nationwide Series career. Brad Keselowski, Dale Earnhardt Jr., and Brian Vickers rounded out the top 5 while Clint Bowyer, Greg Biffle, Jeff Burton, David Ragan, and Jimmie Johnson rounded out the top 10.

After the race was over, a big fight would ensue on pit road. As Hamlin pulled into pit road, members of Keselowski's crew immeadeatly attempted to attack Hamlin over the contact during the caution. But they were held back by NASCAR officials, and members of Hamlin's crew and Jimmie Johnson's crew. Both members of Hamlin and Keselowski got into a bit of a scuffle on pit road with words being exchanged between the two sides. The confrontation lasted at least a minute before things settled down. Hamlin admitted he made contact with Keselowski on purpose saying he did not like the way Keselowski raced him and said Keselowski hit him in the rear during the caution which was why he retaliated by driving right up into him. He also said "I said at the end of that race - I want to do whatever it takes to make that 88's (Keselowski) job the hardest to get around me. I'll block to let the 32 (Busch) win if I have to because of the way he raced me earlier." He also said he was going to talk to Keselowski after the race until Keselowski made contact with Hamlin in which Hamlin also quoted, "you throw a rock, I'm going to throw a concrete block back." Keselowski said “I raced him hard, and that’s what racing is, and he didn’t like us racing him hard. Well, that’s the sport and that’s what I do, I raced him hard and he didn’t think that was cool, so he decided to take my left-front fender off." He also said the damage didn't affect Keselowski at all. Dale Earnhardt Jr. did say he did not appreciate Hamlin tearing up his car for his young driver and said "there was no excuse for Denny to tear up his fender like that." Both drivers were sent to the NASCAR haulers. They also fined three of the JR Motorsports crew members, put Keselowski's crew chief Tony Eury Sr. on probation, and suspended one of his pit crew members for one race. This incident also started a rivalry between Keselowski and Hamlin as the two would get into incidents for years to come. Hamlin also did praise Keselowski's talents during his interview saying Keselowski has enough talent to make it into the Cup Series while also saying that racing the way Keselowski did will hurt you in the future. Keselowski would become a fantastic Cup Series driver as Keselowski has scored 36 career wins including winning the 2012 Cup Series championship as of 2024.

== Race results ==
Pos	Car	Driver	Team	Manufacturer	Laps Run	Laps Led	Status	Points
1	32	Kyle Busch	Braun Racing	Toyota	202	86	running	195
2	20	Denny Hamlin	Joe Gibbs Racing	Toyota	202	0	running	170
3	88	Brad Keselowski	JR Motorsports	Chevrolet	202	25	running	170
4	83	Dale Earnhardt Jr.	JR Motorsports	Chevrolet	202	3	running	165
5	10	Brian Vickers	Braun Racing	Toyota	202	12	running	160
6	2	Clint Bowyer	Richard Childress Racing	Chevrolet	202	0	running	150
7	16	Greg Biffle	Roush Fenway Racing	Ford	202	0	running	146
8	29	Jeff Burton	Richard Childress Racing	Chevrolet	202	0	running	142
9	6	David Ragan	Roush Fenway Racing	Ford	202	29	running	143
10	5	Jimmie Johnson	JR Motorsports	Chevrolet	202	1	running	139
11	99	David Reutimann	Michael Waltrip Racing	Toyota	202	0	running	130
12	64	David Stremme	Rusty Wallace Racing	Chevrolet	202	0	running	127
13	60	Carl Edwards	Roush Fenway Racing	Ford	202	0	running	124
14	59	Marcos Ambrose	JTG Daugherty Racing	Ford	202	0	running	121
15	1	Mike Bliss	Phoenix Racing	Chevrolet	202	0	running	118
16	9	Kasey Kahne	Gillett Evernham Motorsports	Dodge	202	11	running	120
17	11	Jason Keller	CJM Racing	Chevrolet	202	0	running	112
18	25	Bobby Hamilton Jr.	Team Rensi Motorsports	Ford	202	0	running	109
19	33	Kevin Harvick	Kevin Harvick Inc.	Chevrolet	202	0	running	106
20	66	Steve Wallace	Rusty Wallace Racing	Chevrolet	202	0	running	103
21	27	Brad Coleman	Baker Curb Racing	Ford	202	0	running	100
22	7	Mike Wallace	Germain Racing	Toyota	201	0	crash	97
23	28	Kenny Wallace	Jay Robinson Racing	Chevrolet	201	1	running	99
24	22	Josh Wise	Fitz Motorsports	Dodge	201	0	running	91
25	01	Kertus Davis	JD Motorsports	Chevrolet	199	0	running	88
26	61	Kevin Lepage	Specialty Racing	Ford	199	0	running	85
27	81	Brad Baker	MacDonald Motorsports	Dodge	199	0	running	82
28	52	Brad Teague	Means Racing	Chevrolet	196	0	running	79
29	24	Eric McClure	Front Row Motorsports	Chevrolet	196	0	running	76
30	77	Cale Gale (R)	Kevin Harvick Inc.	Chevrolet	179	0	driveshaft	73
31	40	Bryan Clauson (R)	Chip Ganassi Racing	Dodge	178	0	running	70
32	38	Jason Leffler	Braun Racing	Toyota	175	25	crash	72
33	47	Kelly Bires	JTG Daugherty Racing	Ford	158	0	crash	64
34	4	Derrike Cope	Jay Robinson Racing	Chevrolet	139	1	engine	66
35	30	Stanton Barrett	SKI Motorsports	Chevrolet	133	0	electrical	58
36	19	Chase Miller (R)	Gillett Evernham Motorsports	Dodge	128	0	engine	55
37	89	Morgan Shepherd	Faith Motorsports	Dodge	99	0	brakes	52
38	23	Robert Richardson Jr.	R3 Motorsports	Chevrolet	79	0	crash	49
39	12	Sam Hornish Jr.	Penske Racing	Dodge	66	8	crash	51
40	02	Andy Ponstein	Stott Classic Racing	Chevrolet	20	0	handling	43
41	91	Kenny Hendrick	MSRP Motorsports	Chevrolet	16	0	vibration	40
42	84	Carl Long	Elite 2 Racing	Chevrolet	10	0	brakes	37
43	0	Danny Efland	JD Motorsports	Chevrolet	3	0	Chevrolet	34
Official Race results

Previous race: 2008 Diamond Hill Plywood 200	NASCAR Nationwide Series; 2008 season	Next race: 2008 Heluva Good! 200
