= Alsco Uniforms =

American laundry, linen, and uniform-rental company

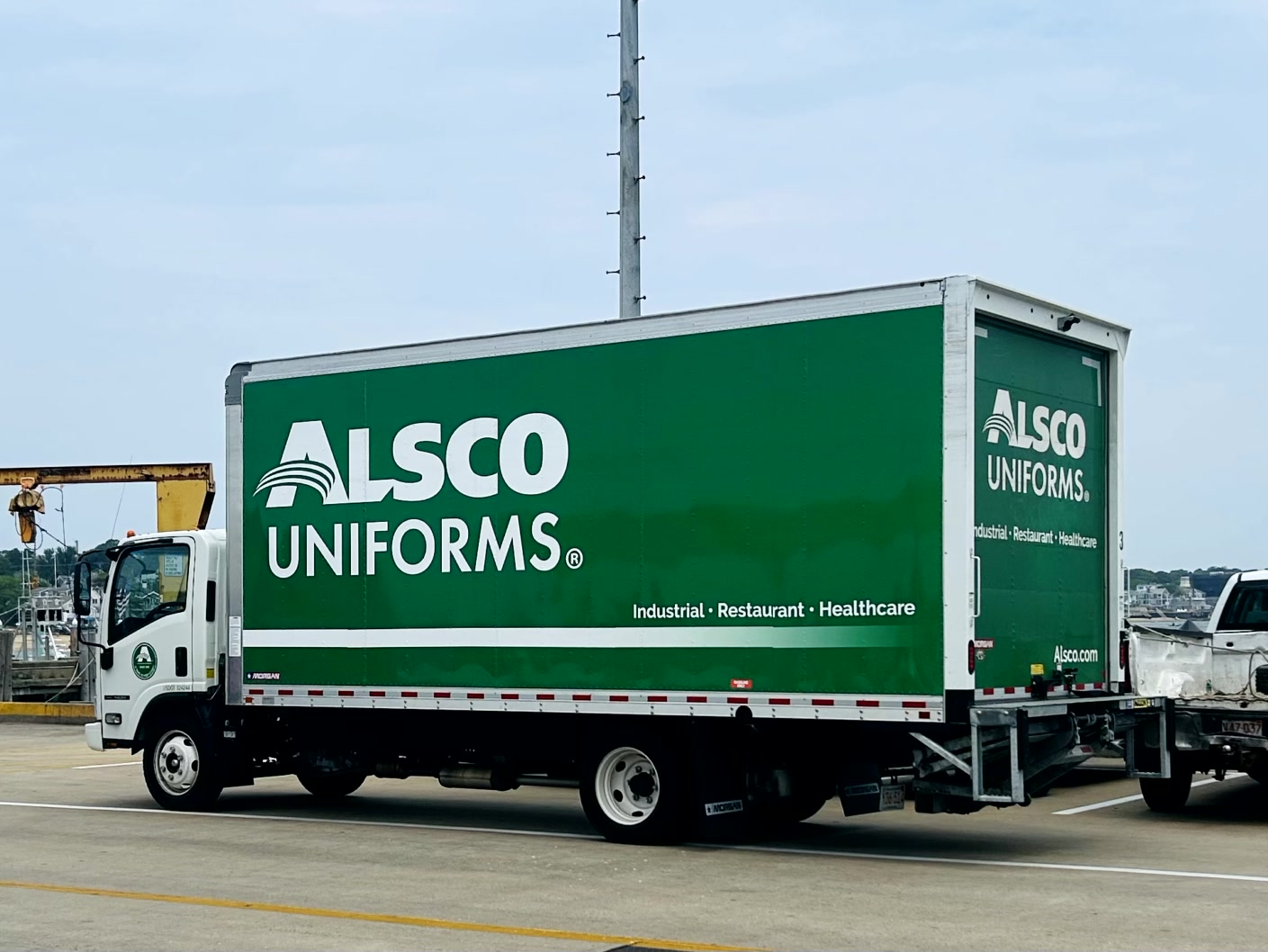
- Industry: Linen and uniform-rental services
- Founded: 1889; 137 years ago
- Founder: George A. Steiner
- Headquarters: Salt Lake City (Utah), United States
- Key people: CEO Robert Steiner
- Number of employees: 20,000+
- Website: www.alsco.com

Alsco Uniforms (originally American Linen & Supply Company) is an American laundry, linen, and uniform-rental company based in Salt Lake City. In 2008, Forbes ranked Alsco Uniforms at #398 on its America's Largest Private Companies list.

== History ==
In 1888, the founder of Alsco Uniforms, George A. Steiner, began working a laundry delivery route in Lincoln, Nebraska, outside school hours. In 1889, he purchased the business for $50.80 ($1,820 in 2025). In 1895, the company relocated to Utah. The company was inherited by George's son, Frank, who in turn handed it over to his son Richard after World War II. In 2001, Richard retired and left the business to Kevin and Robert Steiner. Kevin Steiner retired in 2022, leaving Robert Steiner as CEO.

The company has acquired other companies over the years, including Clean Linen Services Limited in 2017, Churchill Linen in 2024, and Macintosh Services and Topper Linen in 2025.
