= 2018 U.S. Cellular 250 =

19th race of the 2018 NASCAR Xfinity Series

2018 U.S. Cellular 250 presented by The Rasmussen Group
Race details
- Race 19 of 33 of the 2018 NASCAR Xfinity Series
- Date: July 28, 2018
- Official name: 10th Annual U.S. Cellular 250 presented by The Rasmussen Group
- Location: Newton, Iowa, Iowa Speedway
- Course: Permanent racing facility
- Course length: 0.875 miles (1.408 km)
- Distance: 257 laps, 224.875 mi (361.901 km)
- Scheduled distance: 250 laps, 218.75 mi (352.044 km)
- Average speed: 97.772 miles per hour (157.349 km/h)

Pole position
Driver	Elliott Sadler	JR Motorsports
- Time: 23.576

Most laps led
Driver	Cole Custer	Stewart-Haas Racing with Biagi-DenBeste
- Laps: 104

Winner
No. 20	Christopher Bell	Joe Gibbs Racing

Television in the United States
- Network: NBCSN
- Announcers: Dave Burns, Dale Jarrett

Radio in the United States
- Radio: Motor Racing Network

The 2018 U.S. Cellular 250 presented by The Rasmussen Group was the 19th stock car race of the 2018 NASCAR Xfinity Series season, and the 10th iteration of the event. The race was held on Saturday, July 28, 2018, in Newton, Iowa at Iowa Speedway, a 7/8 mile (1.4 km) permanent D-shaped oval racetrack. The race was extended from its scheduled 250 laps to 257 due to a NASCAR overtime finish. At race's end, Christopher Bell of Joe Gibbs Racing would battle and hold off JR Motorsports driver Justin Allgaier in an overtime restart to win his fifth career NASCAR Xfinity Series win, his fourth of the season, and his third consecutive win in the series, a feat that was last accomplished by Dale Earnhardt Jr. in 2018. To fill out the podium, Kyle Benjamin of Joe Gibbs Racing would finish third.

== Background ==
Iowa Speedway is a 7/8-mile (1.4 km) paved oval motor racing track in Newton, Iowa, United States, approximately 30 miles (48 km) east of Des Moines. The track was designed with influence from Rusty Wallace and patterned after Richmond Raceway, a short track where Wallace was very successful. It has over 25,000 permanent seats as well as a unique multi-tiered Recreational Vehicle viewing area along the backstretch.

=== Entry list ===
#	Driver	Team	Make	Sponsor
0	Garrett Smithley	JD Motorsports	Chevrolet	JD Motorsports
00	Cole Custer	Stewart-Haas Racing with Biagi-DenBeste	Ford	Haas Automation
1	Elliott Sadler	JR Motorsports	Chevrolet	U.S. Cellular
01	Vinnie Miller	JD Motorsports	Chevrolet	JAS Expedited Trucking
2	Matt Tifft	Richard Childress Racing	Chevrolet	American Ethanol E15
3	Shane Lee	Richard Childress Racing	Chevrolet	Childress Vineyards
4	Ross Chastain	JD Motorsports	Chevrolet	Future Media Sales, KM Sports
5	Michael Annett	JR Motorsports	Chevrolet	TMC Transportation
7	Justin Allgaier	JR Motorsports	Chevrolet	Precision Tank
8	Ray Black Jr.	B. J. McLeod Motorsports	Chevrolet	JW Transport
9	Tyler Reddick	JR Motorsports	Chevrolet	Takl
11	Ryan Truex	Kaulig Racing	Chevrolet	Phantom Fireworks
15	Brandon Hightower	JD Motorsports	Chevrolet	Kustom Race Parts, Premier Recycling, LLC
16	Ryan Reed	Roush Fenway Racing	Ford	DriveDownA1C.com
18	Kyle Benjamin	Joe Gibbs Racing	Toyota	Mobil 1, Toyota Service Centers
19	Brandon Jones	Joe Gibbs Racing	Toyota	Menards, Tide
20	Christopher Bell	Joe Gibbs Racing	Toyota	Ruud
21	Daniel Hemric	Richard Childress Racing	Chevrolet	South Point Hotel, Casino & Spa
22	Austin Cindric	Team Penske	Ford	LTi Printing
23	Casey Roderick	GMS Racing	Chevrolet	Chevrolet Accessories
26	Max Tullman	Tullman-Walker Racing	Ford	Zoomi
35	Joey Gase	Go Green Racing with SS-Green Light Racing	Chevrolet	The Salvation Army Western, Iowa Donor Network
36	Alex Labbé	DGM Racing	Chevrolet	RoyAuto.com, Outil Mag
38	Jeff Green	RSS Racing	Chevrolet	RSS Racing
39	Ryan Sieg	RSS Racing	Chevrolet	Lombard Bros Gaming
40	Chad Finchum	MBM Motorsports	Toyota	Smithbilt Homes
42	John Hunter Nemechek	Chip Ganassi Racing	Chevrolet	Fire Alarm Services
45	Josh Bilicki	JP Motorsports	Toyota	Prevagen
51	Jeremy Clements	Jeremy Clements Racing	Chevrolet	RepairableVehicles.com
52	David Starr	Jimmy Means Racing	Chevrolet	Honest Wrenches
55	Peter Shepherd III	JP Motorsports	Toyota	Prevagen, National Exhaust Systems, Inc.
60	Chase Briscoe	Roush Fenway Racing	Ford	Ford
66	Stan Mullis	MBM Motorsports	Chevrolet	LasVegas.net, TLC Resorts
74	Mike Harmon	Mike Harmon Racing	Chevrolet	Shadow Warriors Project, Horizon Transport
76	Spencer Boyd	SS-Green Light Racing	Chevrolet	Grunt Style "This We'll Defend"
78	Tommy Joe Martins	B. J. McLeod Motorsports	Chevrolet	Riessen Construction
89	Morgan Shepherd	Shepherd Racing Ventures	Chevrolet	Visone RV Motorhome Parts, Racing with Jesus
90	Josh Williams	DGM Racing	Chevrolet	DGM Racing
92	Dexter Bean	DGM Racing	Chevrolet	DGM Racing
93	Stephen Leicht	RSS Racing	Chevrolet	RSS Racing
Official entry list

== Practice ==
=== First practice ===
The first practice session was held on Friday, July 27, at 4:05 p.m. CST, and would last for 50 minutes. Elliott Sadler of JR Motorsports would set the fastest time in the session, with a lap of 24.046 and an average speed of 130.999 miles per hour (210.822 km/h).

Pos.	#	Driver	Team	Make	Time	Speed
1	1	Elliott Sadler	JR Motorsports	Chevrolet	24.046	130.999
2	20	Christopher Bell	Joe Gibbs Racing	Toyota	24.047	130.993
3	9	Tyler Reddick	JR Motorsports	Chevrolet	24.108	130.662
Full first practice results

=== Second and final practice ===
The second and final practice session, sometimes referred to as Happy Hour, was held on Friday, July 27, at 6:05 p.m. CST, and would last for 50 minutes. Casey Roderick of GMS Racing would set the fastest time in the session, with a lap of 23.933 and an average speed of 131.617 miles per hour (211.817 km/h).

Pos.	#	Driver	Team	Make	Time	Speed
1	23	Casey Roderick	GMS Racing	Chevrolet	23.933	131.617
2	7	Justin Allgaier	JR Motorsports	Chevrolet	23.961	131.464
3	1	Elliott Sadler	JR Motorsports	Chevrolet	24.014	131.173
Full Happy Hour practice results

== Qualifying ==
Qualifying was held on Saturday, July 28, at 4:20 p.m. CST. Since Iowa Speedway is under 2 miles (3.2 km), the qualifying system was a multi-car system that included three rounds. The first round was 15 minutes, where every driver would be able to set a lap within the 15 minutes. Then, the second round would consist of the fastest 24 cars in Round 1, and drivers would have 10 minutes to set a lap. Round 3 consisted of the fastest 12 drivers from Round 2, and the drivers would have 5 minutes to set a time. Whoever was fastest in Round 3 would win the pole.

Elliott Sadler of JR Motorsports would win the pole after advancing from both preliminary rounds and setting the fastest lap in Round 3, with a time of 23.576 and an average speed of 133.610 miles per hour (215.024 km/h).

No drivers would fail to qualify.

=== Full qualifying results ===
Pos.	#	Driver	Team	Make	Time (R1)	Speed (R1)	Time (R2)	Speed (R2)	Time (R3)	Speed (R3)
1	1	Elliott Sadler	JR Motorsports	Chevrolet	23.823	132.225	23.675	133.052	23.576	133.610
2	00	Cole Custer	Stewart-Haas Racing with Biagi-DenBeste	Ford	23.730	132.743	23.640	133.249	23.653	133.175
3	20	Christopher Bell	Joe Gibbs Racing	Toyota	23.566	133.667	23.539	133.820	23.654	133.170
4	18	Kyle Benjamin	Joe Gibbs Racing	Toyota	23.643	133.232	23.595	133.503	23.680	133.024
5	9	Tyler Reddick	JR Motorsports	Chevrolet	23.779	132.470	23.660	133.136	23.691	132.962
6	22	Austin Cindric	Team Penske	Ford	23.765	132.548	23.710	132.855	23.692	132.956
7	7	Justin Allgaier	JR Motorsports	Chevrolet	23.878	131.921	23.826	132.209	23.752	132.620
8	3	Shane Lee	Richard Childress Racing	Chevrolet	23.877	131.926	23.751	132.626	23.785	132.436
9	19	Brandon Jones	Joe Gibbs Racing	Toyota	23.732	132.732	23.724	132.777	23.800	132.353
10	21	Daniel Hemric	Richard Childress Racing	Chevrolet	23.807	132.314	23.754	132.609	23.819	132.247
11	42	John Hunter Nemechek	Chip Ganassi Racing	Chevrolet	23.869	131.970	23.731	132.738	23.831	132.181
12	60	Chase Briscoe	Roush Fenway Racing	Ford	23.971	131.409	23.703	132.895	23.852	132.064
Eliminated in Round 2
13	51	Jeremy Clements	Jeremy Clements Racing	Chevrolet	24.057	130.939	23.838	132.142	—	—
14	11	Ryan Truex	Kaulig Racing	Chevrolet	23.737	132.704	23.864	131.998	—	—
15	23	Casey Roderick	GMS Racing	Chevrolet	23.868	131.976	23.895	131.827	—	—
16	2	Matt Tifft	Richard Childress Racing	Chevrolet	23.973	131.398	23.897	131.816	—	—
17	5	Michael Annett	JR Motorsports	Chevrolet	23.851	132.070	23.900	131.799	—	—
18	4	Ross Chastain	JD Motorsports	Chevrolet	23.930	131.634	23.909	131.750	—	—
19	16	Ryan Reed	Roush Fenway Racing	Ford	23.964	131.447	23.944	131.557	—	—
20	39	Ryan Sieg	RSS Racing	Chevrolet	23.849	132.081	24.020	131.141	—	—
21	36	Alex Labbé	DGM Racing	Chevrolet	24.045	131.004	24.062	130.912	—	—
22	35	Joey Gase	Go Green Racing with SS-Green Light Racing	Chevrolet	24.253	129.881	24.348	129.374	—	—
23	52	David Starr	Jimmy Means Racing	Chevrolet	24.188	130.230	—	—	—	—
24	0	Garrett Smithley	JD Motorsports	Chevrolet	24.236	129.972	—	—	—	—
Eliminated in Round 1
25	78	Tommy Joe Martins	B. J. McLeod Motorsports	Chevrolet	24.278	129.747	—	—	—	—
26	26	Max Tullman	Tullman-Walker Racing	Ford	24.286	129.704	—	—	—	—
27	76	Spencer Boyd	SS-Green Light Racing	Chevrolet	24.359	129.316	—	—	—	—
28	15	Brandon Hightower	JD Motorsports	Chevrolet	24.400	129.098	—	—	—	—
29	40	Chad Finchum	MBM Motorsports	Toyota	24.407	129.061	—	—	—	—
30	8	Ray Black Jr.	B. J. McLeod Motorsports	Chevrolet	24.441	128.882	—	—	—	—
31	90	Josh Williams	DGM Racing	Chevrolet	24.594	128.080	—	—	—	—
32	38	Jeff Green	RSS Racing	Chevrolet	24.634	127.872	—	—	—	—
33	89	Morgan Shepherd	Shepherd Racing Ventures	Chevrolet	24.643	127.825	—	—	—	—
Qualified by owner's points
34	01	Vinnie Miller	JD Motorsports	Chevrolet	24.704	127.510	—	—	—	—
35	74	Mike Harmon	Mike Harmon Racing	Chevrolet	25.039	125.804	—	—	—	—
36	55	Peter Shepherd III	JP Motorsports	Toyota	25.093	125.533	—	—	—	—
37	66	Stan Mullis	MBM Motorsports	Chevrolet	25.532	123.375	—	—	—	—
38	45	Josh Bilicki	JP Motorsports	Toyota	25.601	123.042	—	—	—	—
39	93	Stephen Leicht	RSS Racing	Chevrolet	—	—	—	—	—	—
Qualified on time
40	92	Dexter Bean	DGM Racing	Chevrolet	25.082	125.588	—	—	—	—
Official qualifying results
Official starting lineup

== Race results ==
Stage 1 Laps: 60

Pos.	#	Driver	Team	Make	Pts
1	00	Cole Custer	Stewart-Haas Racing with Biagi-DenBeste	Ford	10
2	1	Elliott Sadler	JR Motorsports	Chevrolet	9
3	20	Christopher Bell	Joe Gibbs Racing	Toyota	8
4	22	Austin Cindric	Team Penske	Ford	7
5	18	Kyle Benjamin	Joe Gibbs Racing	Toyota	6
6	7	Justin Allgaier	JR Motorsports	Chevrolet	5
7	19	Brandon Jones	Joe Gibbs Racing	Toyota	4
8	42	John Hunter Nemechek	Chip Ganassi Racing	Chevrolet	3
9	21	Daniel Hemric	Richard Childress Racing	Chevrolet	2
10	3	Shane Lee	Richard Childress Racing	Chevrolet	1

Stage 2 Laps: 60

Pos.	#	Driver	Team	Make	Pts
1	20	Christopher Bell	Joe Gibbs Racing	Toyota	10
2	00	Cole Custer	Stewart-Haas Racing with Biagi-DenBeste	Ford	9
3	7	Justin Allgaier	JR Motorsports	Chevrolet	8
4	19	Brandon Jones	Joe Gibbs Racing	Toyota	7
5	22	Austin Cindric	Team Penske	Ford	6
6	42	John Hunter Nemechek	Chip Ganassi Racing	Chevrolet	5
7	18	Kyle Benjamin	Joe Gibbs Racing	Toyota	4
8	1	Elliott Sadler	JR Motorsports	Chevrolet	3
9	16	Ryan Reed	Roush Fenway Racing	Ford	2
10	21	Daniel Hemric	Richard Childress Racing	Chevrolet	1

Stage 3 Laps: 137

Fin	St	#	Driver	Team	Make	Laps	Led	Status	Pts
1	3	20	Christopher Bell	Joe Gibbs Racing	Toyota	257	94	running	58
2	7	7	Justin Allgaier	JR Motorsports	Chevrolet	257	6	running	48
3	4	18	Kyle Benjamin	Joe Gibbs Racing	Toyota	257	5	running	44
4	18	4	Ross Chastain	JD Motorsports	Chevrolet	257	0	running	33
5	11	42	John Hunter Nemechek	Chip Ganassi Racing	Chevrolet	257	0	running	40
6	1	1	Elliott Sadler	JR Motorsports	Chevrolet	257	41	running	43
7	19	16	Ryan Reed	Roush Fenway Racing	Ford	257	0	running	32
8	14	11	Ryan Truex	Kaulig Racing	Chevrolet	257	0	running	29
9	2	00	Cole Custer	Stewart-Haas Racing with Biagi-DenBeste	Ford	257	104	running	47
10	12	60	Chase Briscoe	Roush Fenway Racing	Ford	257	0	running	27
11	10	21	Daniel Hemric	Richard Childress Racing	Chevrolet	257	0	running	29
12	9	19	Brandon Jones	Joe Gibbs Racing	Toyota	257	1	running	36
13	8	3	Shane Lee	Richard Childress Racing	Chevrolet	256	6	running	25
14	17	5	Michael Annett	JR Motorsports	Chevrolet	256	0	running	23
15	15	23	Casey Roderick	GMS Racing	Chevrolet	256	0	running	22
16	21	36	Alex Labbé	DGM Racing	Chevrolet	255	0	running	21
17	22	35	Joey Gase	Go Green Racing with SS-Green Light Racing	Chevrolet	255	0	running	20
18	6	22	Austin Cindric	Team Penske	Ford	254	0	running	32
19	23	52	David Starr	Jimmy Means Racing	Chevrolet	253	0	running	18
20	13	51	Jeremy Clements	Jeremy Clements Racing	Chevrolet	253	0	running	17
21	25	78	Tommy Joe Martins	B. J. McLeod Motorsports	Chevrolet	253	0	running	16
22	5	9	Tyler Reddick	JR Motorsports	Chevrolet	252	0	running	15
23	27	76	Spencer Boyd	SS-Green Light Racing	Chevrolet	252	0	running	14
24	31	90	Josh Williams	DGM Racing	Chevrolet	251	0	running	13
25	24	0	Garrett Smithley	JD Motorsports	Chevrolet	250	0	running	12
26	16	2	Matt Tifft	Richard Childress Racing	Chevrolet	249	0	crash	11
27	28	15	Brandon Hightower	JD Motorsports	Chevrolet	249	0	running	10
28	30	8	Ray Black Jr.	B. J. McLeod Motorsports	Chevrolet	248	0	running	9
29	34	01	Vinnie Miller	JD Motorsports	Chevrolet	247	0	running	8
30	26	26	Max Tullman	Tullman-Walker Racing	Ford	245	0	crash	0
31	36	55	Peter Shepherd III	JP Motorsports	Toyota	242	0	running	6
32	35	74	Mike Harmon	Mike Harmon Racing	Chevrolet	241	0	running	5
33	37	66	Stan Mullis	MBM Motorsports	Chevrolet	236	0	running	4
34	20	39	Ryan Sieg	RSS Racing	Chevrolet	206	0	running	3
35	32	38	Jeff Green	RSS Racing	Chevrolet	140	0	ignition	2
36	40	92	Dexter Bean	DGM Racing	Chevrolet	73	0	vibration	1
37	29	40	Chad Finchum	MBM Motorsports	Toyota	56	0	brakes	1
38	33	89	Morgan Shepherd	Shepherd Racing Ventures	Chevrolet	46	0	brakes	1
39	39	93	Stephen Leicht	RSS Racing	Chevrolet	36	0	electrical	1
40	38	45	Josh Bilicki	JP Motorsports	Toyota	2	0	engine	1
Official race results

Previous race: 2018 Lakes Region 200	NASCAR Xfinity Series; 2018 season	Next race: 2018 Zippo 200 at The Glen
