= 2018 DC Solar 300 =

26th race of the 2018 NASCAR Xfinity Series

Race details
- Race 26 of 33 of the 2018 NASCAR Xfinity Series
- Date: September 15, 2018
- Official name: Inaugural DC Solar 300
- Location: North Las Vegas, Nevada, Las Vegas Motor Speedway
- Course: Permanent racing facility
- Course length: 1.5 miles (2.41 km)
- Distance: 200 laps, 300 mi (482.803 km)
- Scheduled distance: 200 laps, 300 mi (482.803 km)
- Average speed: 119.258 miles per hour (191.927 km/h)

Pole position
Driver	Cole Custer	Stewart-Haas Racing with Biagi-DenBeste
- Time: 30.118

Most laps led
Driver	Ross Chastain	Chip Ganassi Racing
- Laps: 180

Winner
No. 42	Ross Chastain	Chip Ganassi Racing

Television in the United States
- Network: NBCSN
- Announcers: Rick Allen, Jeff Burton, Steve Letarte, Dale Earnhardt Jr.

Radio in the United States
- Radio: Performance Racing Network

The 2018 DC Solar 300 was the 26th stock car race of the 2018 NASCAR Xfinity Series season, the final race of the regular season, and the inaugural iteration of the event. The race was held on Saturday, September 15, 2018, in North Las Vegas, Nevada at Las Vegas Motor Speedway, a 1.5 miles (2.4 km) permanent D-shaped oval racetrack. The race took the scheduled 200 laps to complete. At race's end, Ross Chastain of Chip Ganassi Racing would dominate, redeeming himself from the 2018 Sport Clips Haircuts VFW 200 to win his first ever NASCAR Xfinity Series career win and his first and only win of the season. To fill out the podium, Justin Allgaier of JR Motorsports and Cole Custer of Stewart-Haas Racing with Biagi-DenBeste would finish second and third, respectively.

== Background ==
The layout of Las Vegas Motor Speedway, the venue where the race was held.

Las Vegas Motor Speedway, located in Clark County, Nevada outside the Las Vegas city limits and about 15 miles northeast of the Las Vegas Strip, is a 1,200-acre (490 ha) complex of multiple tracks for motorsports racing. The complex is owned by Speedway Motorsports, Inc., which is headquartered in Charlotte, North Carolina.

=== Entry list ===
#	Driver	Team	Make	Sponsor
0	Garrett Smithley	JD Motorsports	Chevrolet	FAME-USA.com
00	Cole Custer	Stewart-Haas Racing with Biagi-DenBeste	Ford	Code 3 Associates
1	Elliott Sadler	JR Motorsports	Chevrolet	OneMain Financial "Lending Done Human"
01	Vinnie Miller	JD Motorsports	Chevrolet	JAS Expedited Trucking
2	Matt Tifft	Richard Childress Racing	Chevrolet	KC Motorgroup
3	Shane Lee	Richard Childress Racing	Chevrolet	Childress Vineyards
4	Landon Cassill	JD Motorsports	Chevrolet	JD Motorsports
5	Michael Annett	JR Motorsports	Chevrolet	Allstate Parts & Service Group
7	Justin Allgaier	JR Motorsports	Chevrolet	Brandt Professional Agriculture
8	Ray Black Jr.	B. J. McLeod Motorsports	Chevrolet	Isokern Fireplaces & Chimmeys
9	Tyler Reddick	JR Motorsports	Chevrolet	Nationwide Children's Hospital
11	Ryan Truex	Kaulig Racing	Chevrolet	LeafFilter Gutter Protection
13	Stan Mullis	MBM Motorsports	Toyota	LasVegas.net, A Mob Story
15	B. J. McLeod	JD Motorsports	Chevrolet	JD Motorsports
16	Ryan Reed	Roush Fenway Racing	Ford	DriveDownA1C.com
18	Ryan Preece	Joe Gibbs Racing	Toyota	Rheem
19	Brandon Jones	Joe Gibbs Racing	Toyota	Menards, Mastercraft Doors
20	Christopher Bell	Joe Gibbs Racing	Toyota	GameStop, Shadow of the Tomb Raider
21	Daniel Hemric	Richard Childress Racing	Chevrolet	South Point Hotel, Casino & Spa
22	Austin Cindric	Team Penske	Ford	MoneyLion
23	Spencer Gallagher	GMS Racing	Chevrolet	Allegiant Air
26	Max Tullman	Tullman-Walker Racing	Ford	Yurpal
35	Joey Gase	Go Green Racing with SS-Green Light Racing	Chevrolet	Sparks Energy
36	Alex Labbé	DGM Racing	Chevrolet	James Carter Attorney at Law, Sticky Stuff Custom Signs & Graphics
38	J. J. Yeley	RSS Racing	Chevrolet	Superior Essex
39	Ryan Sieg	RSS Racing	Chevrolet	Big Valley Towing
40	Chad Finchum	MBM Motorsports	Toyota	LasVegas.net, Smithbilt Homes
42	Ross Chastain	Chip Ganassi Racing	Chevrolet	DC Solar
45	Josh Bilicki	JP Motorsports	Toyota	Prevagen
51	Jeremy Clements	Jeremy Clements Racing	Chevrolet	RepairableVehicles.com
52	David Starr	Jimmy Means Racing	Chevrolet	OxyxAutos.com, Acre One
55	Bayley Currey	JP Motorsports	Toyota	Touched by Pros, Rollin Smoke Barbecue
60	Chase Briscoe	Roush Fenway Racing	Ford	Ford
66	Timmy Hill	MBM Motorsports	Dodge	James Carter Attorney at Law
72	John Jackson	MBM Motorsports	Toyota	James Carter Attorney at Law
74	Mike Harmon	Mike Harmon Racing	Chevrolet	Shadow Warriors Project, Smitty's Beard Sauce
76	Spencer Boyd	SS-Green Light Racing	Chevrolet	Grunt Style "This We'll Defend"
78	Cole Rouse	B. J. McLeod Motorsports	Chevrolet	B. J. McLeod Motorsports
90	Josh Williams	DGM Racing	Chevrolet	Mastin and Cain Warehousing, Sleep Well Sleep Disorder Specialists
93	Jeff Green	RSS Racing	Chevrolet	RSS Racing
Official entry list

== Practice ==
=== First practice ===
The first practice session would occur on Friday, September 14, at 12:05 PM PST, and would last for 40 minutes. Matt Tifft of Richard Childress Racing would set the fastest time in the session, with a lap of 30.403 and an average speed of 177.614 miles per hour (285.842 km/h).

Pos.	#	Driver	Team	Make	Time	Speed
1	2	Matt Tifft	Richard Childress Racing	Chevrolet	30.403	177.614
2	1	Elliott Sadler	JR Motorsports	Chevrolet	30.489	177.113
3	7	Justin Allgaier	JR Motorsports	Chevrolet	30.581	176.580
Full first practice results

=== Second and final practice ===
The second and final practice session, sometimes referred to as Happy Hour, would occur on Friday, September 14, at 2:05 PM PST, and would last for 45 minutes. Tyler Reddick of JR Motorsports would set the fastest time in the session, with a lap of 30.561 and an average speed of 176.696 miles per hour (284.365 km/h).

Pos.	#	Driver	Team	Make	Time	Speed
1	9	Tyler Reddick	JR Motorsports	Chevrolet	30.561	176.696
2	42	Ross Chastain	Chip Ganassi Racing	Chevrolet	30.661	176.120
3	00	Cole Custer	Stewart-Haas Racing with Biagi-DenBeste	Ford	30.690	175.953
Full final practice results

== Qualifying ==
Qualifying would take place on Saturday, March 3, at 10:05 AM PST. Since Las Vegas Motor Speedway is under 2 miles (3.2 km), the qualifying system was a multi-car system that included three rounds. The first round was 15 minutes, where every driver would be able to set a lap within the 15 minutes. Then, the second round would consist of the fastest 24 cars in Round 1, and drivers would have 10 minutes to set a lap. Round 3 consisted of the fastest 12 drivers from Round 2, and the drivers would have 5 minutes to set a time. Whoever was fastest in Round 3 would win the pole.

Cole Custer of Stewart-Haas Racing with Biagi-DenBeste would win the pole, advancing through both preliminary rounds and setting a time of 30.118 and an average speed of 179.295 miles per hour (288.547 km/h) in the third round.

No drivers would fail to qualify.

=== Full qualifying results ===
Pos.	#	Driver	Team	Make	Time (R1)	Speed (R1)	Time (R2)	Speed (R2)	Time (R3)	Speed (R3)
1	00	Cole Custer	Stewart-Haas Racing with Biagi-DenBeste	Ford	30.503	177.032	30.268	178.406	30.118	179.295
2	22	Austin Cindric	Team Penske	Ford	30.879	174.876	30.366	177.830	30.360	177.866
3	1	Elliott Sadler	JR Motorsports	Chevrolet	30.684	175.987	30.648	176.194	30.367	177.825
4	20	Christopher Bell	Joe Gibbs Racing	Toyota	30.662	176.114	30.445	177.369	30.387	177.708
5	42	Ross Chastain	Chip Ganassi Racing	Chevrolet	31.009	174.143	30.305	178.188	30.454	177.317
6	3	Shane Lee	Richard Childress Racing	Chevrolet	30.690	175.953	30.713	175.821	30.456	177.305
7	9	Tyler Reddick	JR Motorsports	Chevrolet	30.621	176.350	30.422	177.503	30.545	176.788
8	7	Justin Allgaier	JR Motorsports	Chevrolet	30.561	176.696	30.570	176.644	30.577	176.603
9	5	Michael Annett	JR Motorsports	Chevrolet	31.557	171.119	30.748	175.621	30.839	175.103
10	39	Ryan Sieg	RSS Racing	Chevrolet	30.737	175.684	30.750	175.610	30.858	174.995
11	16	Ryan Reed	Roush-Fenway Racing	Ford	30.728	175.735	30.535	176.846	30.922	174.633
12	51	Jeremy Clements	Jeremy Clements Racing	Chevrolet	30.787	175.399	30.664	176.102	—	—
Eliminated in Round 2
13	60	Chase Briscoe	Roush-Fenway Racing	Ford	30.872	174.916	30.755	175.581	—	—
14	23	Spencer Gallagher	GMS Racing	Chevrolet	30.973	174.345	30.967	174.379	—	—
15	36	Alex Labbé	DGM Racing	Chevrolet	31.401	171.969	31.036	173.991	—	—
16	4	Landon Cassill	JD Motorsports	Chevrolet	31.270	172.689	31.209	173.027	—	—
17	35	Joey Gase	Go Green Racing with SS-Green Light Racing	Chevrolet	31.178	173.199	31.345	172.276	—	—
18	38	J. J. Yeley	RSS Racing	Chevrolet	31.395	172.002	31.438	171.767	—	—
19	55	Bayley Currey	JP Motorsports	Toyota	31.975	168.882	32.173	167.843	—	—
20	26	Max Tullman	Tullman-Walker Racing	Ford	31.873	169.422	32.823	164.519	—	—
21	8	Ray Black Jr.	B. J. McLeod Motorsports	Chevrolet	31.704	170.326	—	—	—	—
22	78	Cole Rouse	B. J. McLeod Motorsports	Chevrolet	31.717	170.256	—	—	—	—
23	15	B. J. McLeod	JD Motorsports	Chevrolet	31.751	170.073	—	—	—	—
24	52	David Starr	Jimmy Means Racing	Chevrolet	32.057	168.450	—	—	—	—
Eliminated in Round 1
25	66	Timmy Hill	MBM Motorsports	Dodge	32.211	167.645	—	—	—	—
26	45	Josh Bilicki	JP Motorsports	Toyota	32.391	166.713	—	—	—	—
27	76	Spencer Boyd	SS-Green Light Racing	Chevrolet	32.431	166.507	—	—	—	—
28	74	Mike Harmon	Mike Harmon Racing	Chevrolet	32.447	166.425	—	—	—	—
29	40	Chad Finchum	MBM Motorsports	Toyota	32.512	166.093	—	—	—	—
30	93	Jeff Green	RSS Racing	Chevrolet	32.549	165.904	—	—	—	—
31	90	Josh Williams	DGM Racing	Chevrolet	32.734	164.966	—	—	—	—
32	72	John Jackson	MBM Motorsports	Toyota	32.847	164.399	—	—	—	—
33	01	Vinnie Miller	JD Motorsports	Chevrolet	33.253	162.391	—	—	—	—
Qualified by owner's points
34	18	Ryan Preece	Joe Gibbs Racing	Toyota	—	—	—	—	—	—
35	21	Daniel Hemric	Richard Childress Racing	Chevrolet	—	—	—	—	—	—
36	19	Brandon Jones	Joe Gibbs Racing	Toyota	—	—	—	—	—	—
37	2	Matt Tifft	Richard Childress Racing	Chevrolet	—	—	—	—	—	—
38	11	Ryan Truex	Kaulig Racing	Chevrolet	—	—	—	—	—	—
39	0	Garrett Smithley	JD Motorsports	Chevrolet	—	—	—	—	—	—
40	13	Stan Mullis	MBM Motorsports	Toyota	—	—	—	—	—	—
Official qualifying results
Official starting lineup

== Race results ==
Stage 1 Laps: 45

Pos.	#	Driver	Team	Make	Pts
1	42	Ross Chastain	Chip Ganassi Racing	Chevrolet	10
2	20	Christopher Bell	Joe Gibbs Racing	Toyota	9
3	1	Elliott Sadler	JR Motorsports	Chevrolet	8
4	00	Cole Custer	Stewart-Haas Racing with Biagi-DenBeste	Ford	7
5	21	Daniel Hemric	Richard Childress Racing	Chevrolet	6
6	22	Austin Cindric	Team Penske	Ford	5
7	7	Justin Allgaier	JR Motorsports	Chevrolet	4
8	11	Ryan Truex	Kaulig Racing	Chevrolet	3
9	60	Chase Briscoe	Roush-Fenway Racing	Ford	2
10	19	Brandon Jones	Joe Gibbs Racing	Toyota	1

Stage 2 Laps: 45

Pos.	#	Driver	Team	Make	Pts
1	42	Ross Chastain	Chip Ganassi Racing	Chevrolet	10
2	00	Cole Custer	Stewart-Haas Racing with Biagi-DenBeste	Ford	9
3	21	Daniel Hemric	Richard Childress Racing	Chevrolet	8
4	20	Christopher Bell	Joe Gibbs Racing	Toyota	7
5	7	Justin Allgaier	JR Motorsports	Chevrolet	6
6	1	Elliott Sadler	JR Motorsports	Chevrolet	5
7	19	Brandon Jones	Joe Gibbs Racing	Toyota	4
8	22	Austin Cindric	Team Penske	Ford	3
9	9	Tyler Reddick	JR Motorsports	Chevrolet	2
10	60	Chase Briscoe	Roush-Fenway Racing	Ford	1

Stage 3 Laps: 110

Pos.	St	#	Driver	Team	Make	Laps	Led	Status	Pts
1	5	42	Ross Chastain	Chip Ganassi Racing	Chevrolet	200	180	running	60
2	8	7	Justin Allgaier	JR Motorsports	Chevrolet	200	16	running	45
3	1	00	Cole Custer	Stewart-Haas Racing with Biagi-DenBeste	Ford	200	3	running	50
4	4	20	Christopher Bell	Joe Gibbs Racing	Toyota	200	0	running	49
5	3	1	Elliott Sadler	JR Motorsports	Chevrolet	200	0	running	45
6	34	18	Ryan Preece	Joe Gibbs Racing	Toyota	200	0	running	31
7	36	19	Brandon Jones	Joe Gibbs Racing	Toyota	200	0	running	35
8	38	11	Ryan Truex	Kaulig Racing	Chevrolet	200	0	running	32
9	2	22	Austin Cindric	Team Penske	Ford	200	0	running	36
10	14	23	Spencer Gallagher	GMS Racing	Chevrolet	200	0	running	27
11	18	38	J. J. Yeley	RSS Racing	Chevrolet	200	0	running	26
12	10	39	Ryan Sieg	RSS Racing	Chevrolet	200	0	running	25
13	12	51	Jeremy Clements	Jeremy Clements Racing	Chevrolet	200	0	running	24
14	16	4	Landon Cassill	JD Motorsports	Chevrolet	200	0	running	23
15	17	35	Joey Gase	Go Green Racing with SS-Green Light Racing	Chevrolet	200	0	running	22
16	15	36	Alex Labbé	DGM Racing	Chevrolet	200	0	running	21
17	21	8	Ray Black Jr.	B. J. McLeod Motorsports	Chevrolet	198	0	running	20
18	39	0	Garrett Smithley	JD Motorsports	Chevrolet	197	0	running	19
19	23	15	B. J. McLeod	JD Motorsports	Chevrolet	197	0	running	18
20	31	90	Josh Williams	DGM Racing	Chevrolet	196	0	running	17
21	22	78	Cole Rouse	B. J. McLeod Motorsports	Chevrolet	194	0	running	16
22	27	76	Spencer Boyd	SS-Green Light Racing	Chevrolet	194	0	running	15
23	20	26	Max Tullman	Tullman-Walker Racing	Ford	192	0	running	14
24	19	55	Bayley Currey	JP Motorsports	Toyota	191	0	running	0
25	29	40	Chad Finchum	MBM Motorsports	Toyota	191	0	running	12
26	33	01	Vinnie Miller	JD Motorsports	Chevrolet	191	0	running	11
27	26	45	Josh Bilicki	JP Motorsports	Toyota	190	0	running	10
28	7	9	Tyler Reddick	JR Motorsports	Chevrolet	188	0	accident	11
29	35	21	Daniel Hemric	Richard Childress Racing	Chevrolet	188	1	accident	22
30	6	3	Shane Lee	Richard Childress Racing	Chevrolet	188	0	accident	7
31	13	60	Chase Briscoe	Roush-Fenway Racing	Ford	181	0	accident	9
32	24	52	David Starr	Jimmy Means Racing	Chevrolet	145	0	engine	5
33	28	74	Mike Harmon	Mike Harmon Racing	Chevrolet	93	0	clutch	4
34	25	66	Timmy Hill	MBM Motorsports	Dodge	74	0	suspension	3
35	11	16	Ryan Reed	Roush-Fenway Racing	Ford	64	0	accident	2
36	37	2	Matt Tifft	Richard Childress Racing	Chevrolet	63	0	accident	1
37	40	13	Stan Mullis	MBM Motorsports	Toyota	51	0	vibration	1
38	32	72	John Jackson	MBM Motorsports	Toyota	30	0	vibration	1
39	30	93	Jeff Green	RSS Racing	Chevrolet	18	0	vibration	1
40	9	5	Michael Annett	JR Motorsports	Chevrolet	5	0	accident	1
Official race results

Previous race: 2018 Lilly Diabetes 250	NASCAR Xfinity Series; 2018 season	Next race: 2018 Go Bowling 250
