= Doug Richert =

American NASCAR crew chief

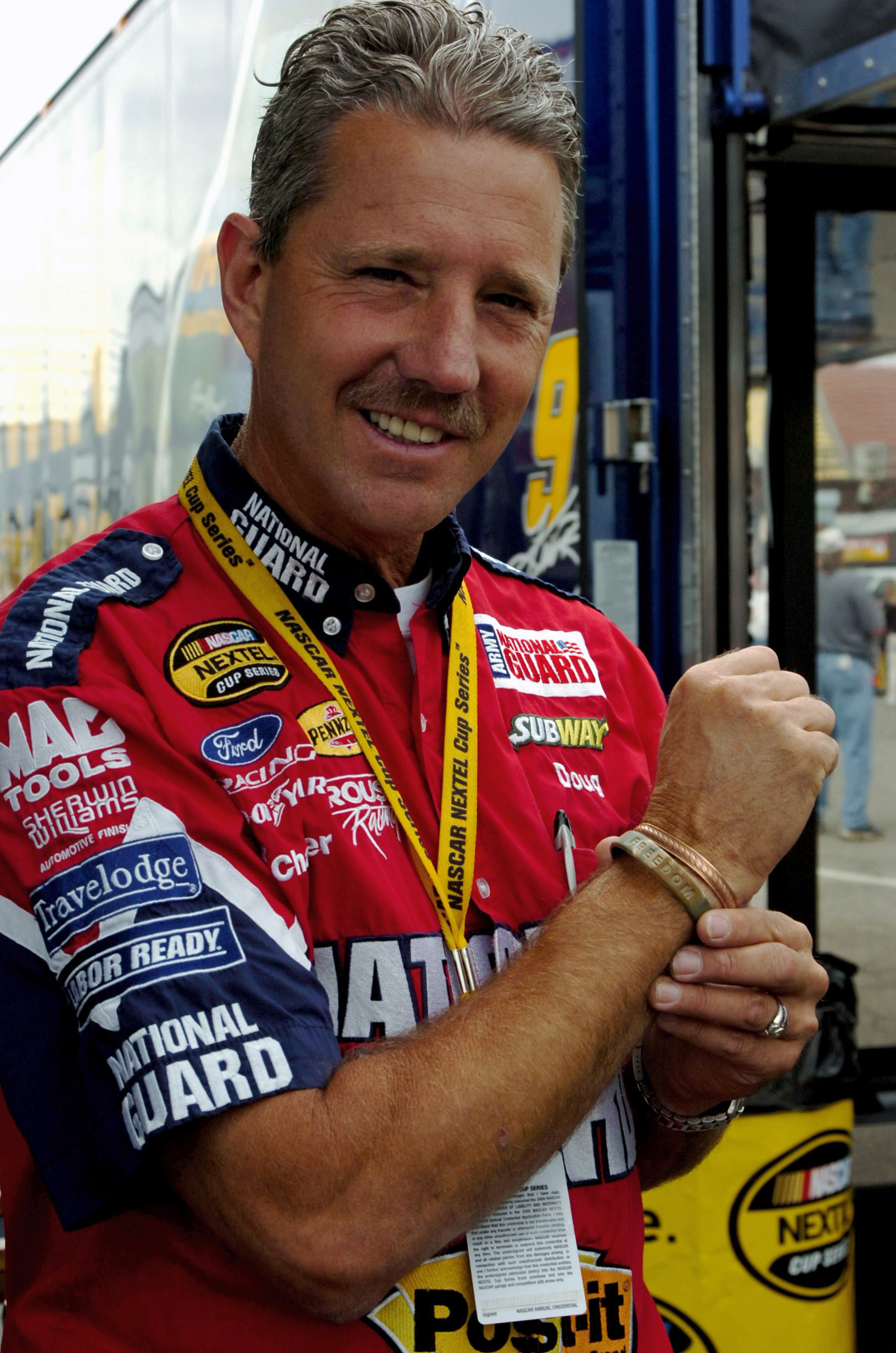
- Richert in 2005

Personal information
- Born: Douglas T. Richert; June 14, 1960 (age 65) San Jose, California, U.S.

Sport
- Country: United States
- Sport: ARCA Menards Series
- Team: 15. Nitro Motorsports

Douglas T. Richert (born June 14, 1960) is an American stock car racing crew chief who works for Nitro Motorsports as the crew chief of their No. 15 car in the ARCA Menards Series.

Richert was the youngest crew chief to win a NASCAR Cup Series championship when he won it in 1980 with Dale Earnhardt at Osterlund Racing at age 20. It was also his first season as a crew chief. He continued as crew chief for Earnhardt's No. 2 car when the team was sold to Jim Stacy. He later crew chiefed for Junior Johnson & Associates, Baker-Schiff Racing, Donlavey Racing, Hess Racing, Diamond Ridge Motorsports, Larry Hedrick Motorsports, LJ Racing, Robert Yates Racing, PPI Motorsports, Roush Racing, Red Bull Racing, Dale Earnhardt, Inc., Gunselman Motorsports, Robby Gordon Motorsports, Keyed-Up Motorsports, TRG Motorsports and BK Racing in the Cup Series and then Tullman-Walker Racing in the Xfinity Series.

== Racing career ==
Richert is best known for winning the Cup championship with Dale Earnhardt in 1980. He started out working for Rod Osterlund as a 16-year-old in 1976. Richert had gone to High School in San Jose with Osterlund's daughter who dated one of his friends, who was interested in racing. Richert got interested in building dirt cars because his friends were, and one thing lead to another. In late 1976, he got the chance to move east with Roland Wlodyka who was forming a Cup team, initially living in a trailer on the property at Charlotte Motor Speedway. Osterlund bought the team in late 1977, and campaigned it with Dave Marcis in 1978, followed by Dale Earnhardt who went on to win the NASCAR Winston Cup Rookie of the Year in 1979. In May 1980, Crew Chief Jake Elder left the team, and Richert who was still 19, replaced him. Richert may have inherited the job in the beginning, but he earned it fair and square when he went on to win the championship with Earnhardt. Midway through 1981, Osterlund sold his team to J.D. Stacy, and Earnhardt moved to Richard Childress Racing taking Richert with him. At the end of 1981, Richert left to take a position with Junior Johnson. From 1984 to 1986, he was the Crew Chief for Neil Bonnett in the No. 12 Budweiser car.

Richert is also the former full-time crew chief for the No. 15 Ford Mustang driven by rookie Timmy Hill and run by Rick Ware Racing in the Nationwide Series. In Cup, he has also been a crew chief for Brian Vickers, Robby Gordon and three seasons with Greg Biffle helping him earn ten wins. In the NASCAR Camping World Truck Series, Richert served as crew chief for three-time champion Ron Hornaday Jr. and 2003 Rookie of the Year Carl Edwards.

Richert joined BK Racing in 2013, and midway through the season replaced Pat Tryson as crew chief for the team's No. 83 car; at the end of the season he was promoted to the team's director of research and development.

Richart was inducted in the West Coast Stock Car Hall of Fame in 2015.

Richert left BK Racing before the 2018 season, and became the crew chief for the No. 78 Mason Mitchell Motorsports team in the ARCA Series. However, MMM shut down mid-year, leaving him without a job until he quickly reunited with Max Tullman (one of the drivers he crew chiefed in ARCA that year) after he started his own new Xfinity team, Tullman-Walker Racing. Richert and Tullman went to Carl Long's MBM Motorsports team in 2019, and there he crew chiefed Tullman in the races he ran with them along with some other drivers as well. Richert continued with MBM as an Xfinity Series crew chief in 2020 on the team's No. 61 car, crew chiefing Timmy Hill and Austin Hill (in a collaboration with Hattori Racing Enterprises) in select races. In 2021, he crew chiefed MBM's No. 42, No. 61 and No. 66 cars on a rotating basis, working with Timmy and Austin Hill again as well as David Starr, Matt Jaskol, Stephen Leicht, Chad Finchum and C. J. McLaughlin.

After the 2021 season, Richert resigned from MBM Motorsports and had a deal in place to crew chief for another team in 2022 that ultimately fell through. There were two other opportunities for him to become a team manager/administrator-type role as well but he ultimately did not work with a team that year to care for his wife who was battling cancer.

Richert returned to MBM in 2025 to crew chief Tyler Tomassi in the No. 66 car in the spring Xfinity Series race at Bristol.

== Personal life ==
Richert married his wife Robin in 1985. She was diagnosed with mucinous carcinoma, a rare form of cancer, in 2018.

Richert works at The Chandler School in Greenville, South Carolina in their ACE Program, which teaches middle schoolers the ins and outs of motorsports through hands-on experience.
