= 2018 Kansas Lottery 300 =

30th race of the 2018 NASCAR Xfinity Series

Race details
- Race 30 of 33 in the 2018 NASCAR Xfinity Series
- Date: October 20, 2018
- Official name: 18th Annual Kansas Lottery 300
- Location: Kansas City, Kansas, Kansas Speedway
- Course: Permanent racing facility
- Course length: 1.5 miles (2.41 km)
- Distance: 200 laps, 300 mi (482.803 km)
- Scheduled distance: 200 laps, 300 mi (482.803 km)
- Average speed: 118.995 miles per hour (191.504 km/h)

Pole position
Driver	Daniel Hemric	Richard Childress Racing
- Time: 29.355

Most laps led
Driver	Daniel Hemric	Richard Childress Racing
- Laps: 128

Winner
No. 42	John Hunter Nemechek	Chip Ganassi Racing

Television in the United States
- Network: NBC
- Announcers: Rick Allen, Jeff Burton, Steve Letarte, Dale Earnhardt Jr.

Radio in the United States
- Radio: Motor Racing Network

The 2018 Kansas Lottery 300 was the 30th stock car race of the 2018 NASCAR Xfinity Series season, the first race in the Round of 12, and the 18th iteration of the event. The race was held on Saturday, October 20, 2018, in Kansas City, Kansas at Kansas Speedway, a 1.500 miles (2.414 km) permanent paved oval-shaped racetrack. The race took the scheduled 200 laps to complete. At race's end, John Hunter Nemechek of Chip Ganassi Racing would take advantage of a late-race restart and pass eventual second-place driver Richard Childress Racing driver Daniel Hemric to win his first career NASCAR Xfinity Series win and his first and only win of the season. To fill out the podium, Elliott Sadler of JR Motorsports would finish third.

== Background ==
The layout of Kansas Speedway, the venue where the race was held.

Kansas Speedway is a 1.5-mile (2.4 km) tri-oval race track in Kansas City, Kansas. It was built in 2001 and hosts two annual NASCAR race weekends. The NTT IndyCar Series also raced there until 2011. The speedway is owned and operated by the International Speedway Corporation.

=== Entry list ===
#	Driver	Team	Make	Sponsor
0	Garrett Smithley	JD Motorsports	Chevrolet	Trophy Tractor
00	Cole Custer	Stewart-Haas Racing with Biagi-DenBeste	Ford	Haas Automation
1	Elliott Sadler	JR Motorsports	Chevrolet	Textron Off Road, Arctic Cat
01	B. J. McLeod	JD Motorsports	Chevrolet	JD Motorsports
2	Matt Tifft	Richard Childress Racing	Chevrolet	American Ethanol E15, Sorghum
3	Shane Lee	Richard Childress Racing	Chevrolet	Childress Vineyards
4	Ross Chastain	JD Motorsports	Chevrolet	In Memory of Charlie Blanton
5	Michael Annett	JR Motorsports	Chevrolet	Pilot Flying J
7	Justin Allgaier	JR Motorsports	Chevrolet	Brandt Professional Agriculture
8	Jairo Avila Jr.	B. J. McLeod Motorsports	Chevrolet	JW Transport, ART General Contractor
9	Tyler Reddick	JR Motorsports	Chevrolet	BurgerFi
11	Ryan Truex	Kaulig Racing	Chevrolet	LeafFilter Gutter Protection
13	Timmy Hill	MBM Motorsports	Toyota	MBM Motorsports
15	Quin Houff	JD Motorsports	Chevrolet	JD Motorsports
16	Ryan Reed	Roush Fenway Racing	Ford	DriveDownA1C.com
18	Ryan Preece	Joe Gibbs Racing	Toyota	Craftsman
19	Brandon Jones	Joe Gibbs Racing	Toyota	Game Plan For Life
20	Christopher Bell	Joe Gibbs Racing	Toyota	Rheem
21	Daniel Hemric	Richard Childress Racing	Chevrolet	South Point Hotel, Casino & Spa
22	Austin Cindric	Team Penske	Ford	Menards, Richmond Water Heaters
23	Spencer Gallagher	GMS Racing	Chevrolet	Allegiant Air
26	Max Tullman	Tullman-Walker Racing	Ford	Eskata
35	Joey Gase	Go Green Racing with SS-Green Light Racing	Chevrolet	Absaroka
36	Alex Labbé	DGM Racing	Chevrolet	Alpha Prime Regimen
37	J. J. Yeley	RSS Racing	Chevrolet	RSS Racing
38	Angela Ruch	RSS Racing	Chevrolet	Adoption For My Child "Connecting Families"
39	Ryan Sieg	RSS Racing	Chevrolet	Frank Foster's 'Til I'm Gone
40	Chad Finchum	MBM Motorsports	Toyota	Smithbilt Homes
42	John Hunter Nemechek	Chip Ganassi Racing	Chevrolet	Fire Alarm Services
45	Josh Bilicki	JP Motorsports	Toyota	Prevagen
51	Jeremy Clements	Jeremy Clements Racing	Chevrolet	RepairableVehicles.com
52	David Starr	Jimmy Means Racing	Chevrolet	Wilkerson Crane Rental
55	Bayley Currey	JP Motorsports	Toyota	Touched by Pros, Rollin Smoke Barbecue
60	Ty Majeski	Roush Fenway Racing	Ford	Ford
66	Bobby Dale Earnhardt	MBM Motorsports	Toyota	HABCO Material Handling Specialists, Copeland Insurance Agency
74	Mike Harmon	Mike Harmon Racing	Dodge	Shadow Warriors Project, The Journey Home Project
76	Spencer Boyd	SS-Green Light Racing	Chevrolet	Grunt Style "This We'll Defend"
78	Vinnie Miller	B. J. McLeod Motorsports	Chevrolet	CorvetteParts.net
89	Morgan Shepherd	Shepherd Racing Ventures	Chevrolet	Visone RV Motorhome Parts, Racing with Jesus
90	Josh Williams	DGM Racing	Chevrolet	Sleep Well Sleep Disorder Specialists
93	Jeff Green	RSS Racing	Chevrolet	RSS Racing
98	Chase Briscoe	Stewart-Haas Racing with Biagi-DenBeste	Ford	NutriChomps
99	Stephen Leicht	B. J. McLeod Motorsports	Chevrolet	B. J. McLeod Motorsports
Official entry list

== Practice ==
=== First practice ===
The first practice session was held on Friday, October 19, at 2:05 PM CST, and would last for 50 minutes. Daniel Hemric of Richard Childress Racing would set the fastest time in the session, with a lap of 30.014 and an average speed of 179.916 miles per hour (289.547 km/h).

Pos.	#	Driver	Team	Make	Time	Speed
1	21	Daniel Hemric	Richard Childress Racing	Chevrolet	30.014	179.916
2	20	Christopher Bell	Joe Gibbs Racing	Toyota	30.057	179.659
3	9	Tyler Reddick	JR Motorsports	Chevrolet	30.088	179.474
Official first practice results

=== Second and final practice ===
The second and final practice session, sometimes referred to as Happy Hour, was held on Friday, October 19, at 4:00 PM CST, and would last for 50 minutes. Shane Lee of Richard Childress Racing would set the fastest time in the session, with a lap of 30.087 and an average speed of 179.480 miles per hour (288.845 km/h).

Pos.	#	Driver	Team	Make	Time	Speed
1	3	Shane Lee	Richard Childress Racing	Chevrolet	30.087	179.480
2	60	Ty Majeski	Roush Fenway Racing	Ford	30.098	179.414
3	20	Christopher Bell	Joe Gibbs Racing	Toyota	30.221	178.684
Official Happy Hour practice results

== Qualifying ==
Qualifying was held on Saturday, October 20, at 10:40 AM CST. Since Kansas Speedway is under 2 miles (3.2 km), the qualifying system was a multi-car system that included three rounds. The first round was 15 minutes, where every driver would be able to set a lap within the 15 minutes. Then, the second round would consist of the fastest 24 cars in Round 1, and drivers would have 10 minutes to set a lap. Round 3 consisted of the fastest 12 drivers from Round 2, and the drivers would have 5 minutes to set a time. Whoever was fastest in Round 3 would win the pole.

Daniel Hemric of Richard Childress Racing would win the pole, setting a lap of 29.355 and an average speed of 183.955 miles per hour (296.047 km/h) in the third round.

Three drivers would fail to qualify: Bayley Currey, Morgan Shepherd, and Max Tullman.

=== Full qualifying results ===
Pos.	#	Driver	Team	Make	Time (R1)	Speed (R1)	Time (R2)	Speed (R2)	Time (R3)	Speed (R3)
1	21	Daniel Hemric	Richard Childress Racing	Chevrolet	29.729	181.641	29.610	182.371	29.355	183.955
2	20	Christopher Bell	Joe Gibbs Racing	Toyota	29.976	180.144	29.647	182.143	29.543	182.784
3	7	Justin Allgaier	JR Motorsports	Chevrolet	29.804	181.184	29.680	181.941	29.601	182.426
4	22	Austin Cindric	Team Penske	Ford	29.861	180.838	29.556	182.704	29.629	182.254
5	19	Brandon Jones	Joe Gibbs Racing	Toyota	30.197	178.826	29.563	182.661	29.629	182.254
6	9	Tyler Reddick	JR Motorsports	Chevrolet	30.001	179.994	29.658	182.076	29.666	182.027
7	18	Ryan Preece	Joe Gibbs Racing	Toyota	30.114	179.319	29.478	183.187	29.710	181.757
8	3	Shane Lee	Richard Childress Racing	Chevrolet	29.982	180.108	29.641	182.180	29.752	181.500
9	2	Matt Tifft	Richard Childress Racing	Chevrolet	30.590	176.528	29.659	182.070	29.770	181.391
10	00	Cole Custer	Stewart-Haas Racing with Biagi-DenBeste	Ford	29.975	180.150	29.676	181.965	29.840	180.965
11	1	Elliott Sadler	JR Motorsports	Chevrolet	30.061	179.635	29.649	182.131	29.860	180.844
12	98	Chase Briscoe	Stewart-Haas Racing with Biagi-DenBeste	Ford	29.896	180.626	29.635	182.217	29.931	180.415
Eliminated in Round 1
13	42	John Hunter Nemechek	Chip Ganassi Racing	Chevrolet	29.999	180.006	29.690	181.879	—	—
14	11	Ryan Truex	Kaulig Racing	Chevrolet	30.057	179.659	29.806	181.172	—	—
15	5	Michael Annett	JR Motorsports	Chevrolet	30.407	177.591	29.915	180.511	—	—
16	16	Ryan Reed	Roush Fenway Racing	Ford	30.330	178.042	29.949	180.307	—	—
17	23	Spencer Gallagher	GMS Racing	Chevrolet	30.189	178.873	29.975	180.150	—	—
18	60	Ty Majeski	Roush Fenway Racing	Ford	30.009	179.946	30.006	179.964	—	—
19	39	Ryan Sieg	RSS Racing	Chevrolet	30.554	176.736	30.082	179.509	—	—
20	35	Joey Gase	Go Green Racing with SS-Green Light Racing	Chevrolet	30.668	176.079	30.531	176.869	—	—
21	37	J. J. Yeley	RSS Racing	Chevrolet	30.579	176.592	—	—	—	—
22	4	Ross Chastain	JD Motorsports	Chevrolet	30.609	176.419	—	—	—	—
23	0	Garrett Smithley	JD Motorsports	Chevrolet	30.653	176.165	—	—	—	—
24	99	Stephen Leicht	B. J. McLeod Motorsports	Chevrolet	30.825	175.182	—	—	—	—
Eliminated in Round 2
25	13	Timmy Hill	MBM Motorsports	Toyota	30.894	174.791	—	—	—	—
26	93	Jeff Green	RSS Racing	Chevrolet	30.911	174.695	—	—	—	—
27	36	Alex Labbé	DGM Racing	Chevrolet	31.045	173.941	—	—	—	—
28	90	Josh Williams	DGM Racing	Chevrolet	31.108	173.589	—	—	—	—
29	01	B. J. McLeod	JD Motorsports	Chevrolet	31.164	173.277	—	—	—	—
30	66	Bobby Dale Earnhardt	MBM Motorsports	Toyota	31.165	173.271	—	—	—	—
31	15	Quin Houff	JD Motorsports	Chevrolet	31.167	173.260	—	—	—	—
32	8	Jairo Avila Jr.	B. J. McLeod Motorsports	Chevrolet	31.326	172.381	—	—	—	—
33	40	Chad Finchum	MBM Motorsports	Toyota	31.341	172.298	—	—	—	—
Qualified by owner's points
34	52	David Starr	Jimmy Means Racing	Chevrolet	31.465	171.619	—	—	—	—
35	76	Spencer Boyd	SS-Green Light Racing	Chevrolet	31.598	170.897	—	—	—	—
36	78	Vinnie Miller	B. J. McLeod Motorsports	Chevrolet	31.638	170.681	—	—	—	—
37	45	Josh Bilicki	JP Motorsports	Toyota	32.128	168.078	—	—	—	—
38	74	Mike Harmon	Mike Harmon Racing	Chevrolet	32.464	166.338	—	—	—	—
39	38	Angela Ruch	RSS Racing	Chevrolet	33.833	159.607	—	—	—	—
40	51	Jeremy Clements	Jeremy Clements Racing	Chevrolet	—	—	—	—	—	—
Failed to qualify
41	55	Bayley Currey	JP Motorsports	Toyota	31.370	172.139	—	—	—	—
42	89	Morgan Shepherd	Shepherd Racing Ventures	Chevrolet	32.401	166.662	—	—	—	—
43	26	Max Tullman	Tullman-Walker Racing	Ford	—	—	—	—	—	—
Official qualifying results
Official starting lineup

== Race results ==
Stage 1 Laps: 45

Pos.	#	Driver	Team	Make	Pts
1	21	Daniel Hemric	Richard Childress Racing	Chevrolet	10
2	42	John Hunter Nemechek	Chip Ganassi Racing	Chevrolet	9
3	18	Ryan Preece	Joe Gibbs Racing	Toyota	8
4	3	Shane Lee	Richard Childress Racing	Chevrolet	7
5	1	Elliott Sadler	JR Motorsports	Chevrolet	6
6	9	Tyler Reddick	JR Motorsports	Chevrolet	5
7	2	Matt Tifft	Richard Childress Racing	Chevrolet	4
8	16	Ryan Reed	Roush Fenway Racing	Ford	3
9	11	Ryan Truex	Kaulig Racing	Chevrolet	2
10	0	Garrett Smithley	JD Motorsports	Chevrolet	1

Stage 2 Laps: 45

Pos.	#	Driver	Team	Make	Pts
1	42	John Hunter Nemechek	Chip Ganassi Racing	Chevrolet	10
2	21	Daniel Hemric	Richard Childress Racing	Chevrolet	9
3	9	Tyler Reddick	JR Motorsports	Chevrolet	8
4	1	Elliott Sadler	JR Motorsports	Chevrolet	7
5	2	Matt Tifft	Richard Childress Racing	Chevrolet	6
6	3	Shane Lee	Richard Childress Racing	Chevrolet	5
7	60	Ty Majeski	Roush Fenway Racing	Ford	4
8	16	Ryan Reed	Roush Fenway Racing	Ford	3
9	39	Ryan Sieg	RSS Racing	Chevrolet	2
10	11	Ryan Truex	Kaulig Racing	Chevrolet	1

Stage 3 Laps: 110

Fin	St	#	Driver	Team	Make	Laps	Led	Status	Pts
1	13	42	John Hunter Nemechek	Chip Ganassi Racing	Chevrolet	200	64	running	59
2	1	21	Daniel Hemric	Richard Childress Racing	Chevrolet	200	128	running	54
3	11	1	Elliott Sadler	JR Motorsports	Chevrolet	200	2	running	47
4	8	3	Shane Lee	Richard Childress Racing	Chevrolet	200	0	running	45
5	6	9	Tyler Reddick	JR Motorsports	Chevrolet	200	2	running	45
6	9	2	Matt Tifft	Richard Childress Racing	Chevrolet	200	2	running	41
7	16	16	Ryan Reed	Roush Fenway Racing	Ford	200	0	running	36
8	18	60	Ty Majeski	Roush Fenway Racing	Ford	200	0	running	33
9	19	39	Ryan Sieg	RSS Racing	Chevrolet	199	0	running	30
10	40	51	Jeremy Clements	Jeremy Clements Racing	Chevrolet	199	0	running	27
11	14	11	Ryan Truex	Kaulig Racing	Chevrolet	198	0	running	29
12	27	36	Alex Labbé	DGM Racing	Chevrolet	197	0	running	25
13	23	0	Garrett Smithley	JD Motorsports	Chevrolet	196	0	running	25
14	31	15	Quin Houff	JD Motorsports	Chevrolet	196	0	running	23
15	20	35	Joey Gase	Go Green Racing with SS-Green Light Racing	Chevrolet	195	0	running	22
16	33	40	Chad Finchum	MBM Motorsports	Toyota	195	0	running	21
17	34	52	David Starr	Jimmy Means Racing	Chevrolet	194	0	running	20
18	32	8	Jairo Avila Jr.	B. J. McLeod Motorsports	Chevrolet	193	0	running	19
19	35	76	Spencer Boyd	SS-Green Light Racing	Chevrolet	192	0	running	18
20	37	45	Josh Bilicki	JP Motorsports	Toyota	191	0	running	17
21	7	18	Ryan Preece	Joe Gibbs Racing	Toyota	189	0	running	24
22	36	78	Vinnie Miller	B. J. McLeod Motorsports	Chevrolet	189	0	running	15
23	29	01	B. J. McLeod	JD Motorsports	Chevrolet	189	0	running	14
24	28	90	Josh Williams	DGM Racing	Chevrolet	187	2	running	13
25	22	4	Ross Chastain	JD Motorsports	Chevrolet	182	0	running	12
26	10	00	Cole Custer	Stewart-Haas Racing with Biagi-DenBeste	Ford	181	0	running	11
27	30	66	Bobby Dale Earnhardt	MBM Motorsports	Toyota	133	0	fuel pump	10
28	38	74	Mike Harmon	Mike Harmon Racing	Chevrolet	129	0	running	9
29	39	38	Angela Ruch	RSS Racing	Chevrolet	98	0	oil leak	8
30	12	98	Chase Briscoe	Stewart-Haas Racing with Biagi-DenBeste	Ford	79	0	suspension	7
31	25	13	Timmy Hill	MBM Motorsports	Toyota	54	0	vibration	6
32	24	99	Stephen Leicht	B. J. McLeod Motorsports	Chevrolet	26	0	steering	5
33	17	23	Spencer Gallagher	GMS Racing	Chevrolet	24	0	crash	4
34	26	93	Jeff Green	RSS Racing	Chevrolet	16	0	rear gear	3
35	21	37	J. J. Yeley	RSS Racing	Chevrolet	16	0	brakes	2
36	5	19	Brandon Jones	Joe Gibbs Racing	Toyota	12	0	crash	1
37	2	20	Christopher Bell	Joe Gibbs Racing	Toyota	2	0	crash	1
38	3	7	Justin Allgaier	JR Motorsports	Chevrolet	1	0	crash	1
39	4	22	Austin Cindric	Team Penske	Ford	0	0	crash	1
40	15	5	Michael Annett	JR Motorsports	Chevrolet	0	0	crash	1
Failed to qualify
41		55	Bayley Currey	JP Motorsports	Toyota				
42		89	Morgan Shepherd	Shepherd Racing Ventures	Chevrolet				
43		26	Max Tullman	Tullman-Walker Racing	Ford				
Official race results

Previous race: 2018 Bar Harbor 200	NASCAR Xfinity Series; 2018 season	Next race: 2018 O'Reilly Auto Parts 300
