= 2018 Ford EcoBoost 300 =

33rd race of the 2018 NASCAR Xfinity Series

Race details
- Race 33 of 33 in the 2018 NASCAR Xfinity Series
- Date: November 17, 2018
- Official name: 24th Annual Ford EcoBoost 300
- Location: Homestead, Florida, Homestead-Miami Speedway
- Course: Permanent racing facility
- Course length: 1.5 miles (2.41 km)
- Distance: 200 laps, 300 mi (482.803 km)
- Scheduled distance: 200 laps, 300 mi (482.803 km)
- Average speed: 140.515 miles per hour (226.137 km/h)

Pole position
Driver	Cole Custer	Stewart-Haas Racing with Biagi-DenBeste
- Time: 32.609

Most laps led
Driver	Cole Custer	Stewart-Haas Racing with Biagi-DenBeste
- Laps: 95

Winner
No. 9	Tyler Reddick	JR Motorsports

Television in the United States
- Network: NBCSN
- Announcers: Rick Allen, Jeff Burton, Steve Letarte, Dale Earnhardt Jr.

Radio in the United States
- Radio: Motor Racing Network

The 2018 EcoBoost 300 was the 33rd and final stock car race of the 2018 NASCAR Xfinity Series season, the championship race of that year, and the 24th iteration of the event. The race was held on Saturday, November 17, 2018, in Homestead, Florida at Homestead–Miami Speedway, a 1.5 miles (2.4 km) permanent oval-shaped racetrack. The race took the scheduled 200 laps to complete. At race's end, JR Motorsports driver Tyler Reddick would take the lead after cunning pit strategy late in the race to win his first career NASCAR Xfinity Series championship, his 3rd win of his career in the series, and his second and final win of the season.

== Background ==
Homestead-Miami Speedway is a motor racing track located in Homestead, Florida. The track, which has several configurations, has promoted several series of racing, including NASCAR, the Verizon IndyCar Series, the Grand-Am Rolex Sports Car Series and the Championship Cup Series.

From 2002 to 2019, Homestead–Miami Speedway hosted the final race of the season in all three of NASCAR's series: the Cup Series, the Xfinity Series, and the Camping World Truck Series. Ford Motor Company sponsored all three of the season-ending races, under the names Ford EcoBoost 400, Ford EcoBoost 300, and Ford EcoBoost 200, respectively. The weekend itself was marketed as Ford Championship Weekend. The Xfinity Series held its season-ending races at Homestead from 1995 until 2020, when it was moved to Phoenix Raceway, along with NASCAR's other two series.

=== Championship drivers ===
- Christopher Bell advanced after winning the 2018 Whelen Trusted to Perform 200.
- Cole Custer advanced after winning the 2018 O'Reilly Auto Parts 300.
- Daniel Hemric advanced by virtue of points.
- Tyler Reddick advanced by virtue of points.

=== Entry list ===
#	Driver	Team	Make	Sponsor
0	Garrett Smithley	JD Motorsports	Chevrolet	KDST and Company
00	Cole Custer	Stewart-Haas Racing with Biagi-DenBeste	Ford	Haas Automation
1	Elliott Sadler	JR Motorsports	Chevrolet	OneMain Financial "Lending Done Human"
01	B. J. McLeod	JD Motorsports	Chevrolet	JD Motorsports
2	Matt Tifft	Richard Childress Racing	Chevrolet	Tunity
3	Shane Lee	Richard Childress Racing	Chevrolet	CMR Construction & Roofing
4	Ross Chastain	JD Motorsports	Chevrolet	Florida Watermelon Association
5	Michael Annett	JR Motorsports	Chevrolet	Pilot Flying J "Thank You Veterans"
7	Justin Allgaier	JR Motorsports	Chevrolet	Brandt Professional Agriculture
8	Tommy Joe Martins	B. J. McLeod Motorsports	Chevrolet	B. J. McLeod Motorsports
9	Tyler Reddick	JR Motorsports	Chevrolet	BurgerFi
11	Ryan Truex	Kaulig Racing	Chevrolet	LeafFilter Gutter Protection
13	Timmy Hill	MBM Motorsports	Toyota	CrashClaimsR.Us
15	Quin Houff	JD Motorsports	Chevrolet	JD Motorsports
16	Ryan Reed	Roush Fenway Racing	Ford	DriveDownA1C.com
18	Ryan Preece	Joe Gibbs Racing	Toyota	Rheem, Capitol Container
19	Brandon Jones	Joe Gibbs Racing	Toyota	Juniper Networks
20	Christopher Bell	Joe Gibbs Racing	Toyota	GameStop, Bumblebee
21	Daniel Hemric	Richard Childress Racing	Chevrolet	South Point Hotel, Casino & Spa
22	Austin Cindric	Team Penske	Ford	MoneyLion
23	Spencer Gallagher	GMS Racing	Chevrolet	Allegiant Air
26	Max Tullman	Tullman-Walker Racing	Ford	Eskata
35	Joey Gase	Go Green Racing with SS-Green Light Racing	Chevrolet	Sparks Energy
36	Alex Labbé	DGM Racing	Chevrolet	Alpha Prime Regimen
37	Jeff Green	RSS Racing	Chevrolet	RSS Racing
38	Ryan Sieg	RSS Racing	Chevrolet	RSS Racing
39	Angela Ruch	RSS Racing	Chevrolet	Give A Child A Voice, Sutter St.
40	Carl Long	MBM Motorsports	Dodge	CrashClaimsR.Us "Thanks Dodge, We'll Miss You..."
42	John Hunter Nemechek	Chip Ganassi Racing	Chevrolet	Fire Alarm Services, Lake City, Colorado
45	Josh Bilicki	JP Motorsports	Toyota	Prevagen
51	Jeremy Clements	Jeremy Clements Racing	Chevrolet	RepairableVehicles.com, Fly & Form Structures
52	David Starr	Jimmy Means Racing	Chevrolet	Extreme Kleaner, Shoun Trucking
55	Bayley Currey	JP Motorsports	Toyota	Touched by Pros, Rollin Smoke Barbecue
60	Chase Briscoe	Roush Fenway Racing	Ford	NutriChomps
61	Kaz Grala	Fury Race Cars	Ford	Nettts, Hot Scream
66	Chad Finchum	MBM Motorsports	Toyota	Amana, Smithbilt Homes
74	Tim Viens	Mike Harmon Racing	Chevrolet	Race Day Sponsor
76	Spencer Boyd	SS-Green Light Racing	Chevrolet	Grunt Style "This We'll Defend"
78	Vinnie Miller	B. J. McLeod Motorsports	Chevrolet	JAS Expedited Trucking
86	Brandon Brown	Brandonbilt Motorsports	Chevrolet	Coalition to Salute America's Heroes
89	Morgan Shepherd*	Shepherd Racing Ventures	Chevrolet	Visone RV Motorhome Parts, Racing with Jesus
90	Caesar Bacarella	DGM Racing	Chevrolet	Maxim, Alpha Prime Regimen
92	Josh Williams	DGM Racing	Chevrolet	Star Tron, Sleep Well Sleep Disorder Specialists
93	J. J. Yeley	RSS Racing	Chevrolet	RSS Racing
99	Stephen Leicht	B. J. McLeod Motorsports	Chevrolet	B. J. McLeod Motorsports
Official entry list

*Driver changed to Landon Cassill for qualifying and the race.

== Practice ==
=== First practice ===
The first practice session was held on Friday, November 16, at 2:35 p.m. EST, and would last for 50 minutes. Christopher Bell of Joe Gibbs Racing would set the fastest time in the session, with a lap of 32.298 and an average speed of 167.193 miles per hour (269.071 km/h).

Pos.	#	Driver	Team	Make	Time	Speed
1	20	Christopher Bell	Joe Gibbs Racing	Toyota	32.298	167.193
2	22	Austin Cindric	Team Penske	Ford	32.450	166.410
3	21	Daniel Hemric	Richard Childress Racing	Chevrolet	32.642	165.431
Full first practice results

=== Second and final practice ===
The second and final practice session, sometimes referred to as Happy Hour, was held on Friday, November 16, at 5:05 p.m. EST, and would last for 50 minutes. Ryan Reed of Roush Fenway Racing would set the fastest time in the session, with a lap of 32.442 and an average speed of 166.451 miles per hour (267.877 km/h).

Pos.	#	Driver	Team	Make	Time	Speed
1	16	Ryan Reed	Roush Fenway Racing	Ford	32.442	166.451
2	22	Austin Cindric	Team Penske	Ford	32.492	166.195
3	1	Elliott Sadler	JR Motorsports	Chevrolet	32.555	165.873
Full Happy Hour practice results

== Qualifying ==
Qualifying was held on Saturday, November 17, at 12:35 p.m. EST. Since Homestead–Miami Speedway is under 2 miles (3.2 km), the qualifying system was a multi-car system that included three rounds. The first round was 15 minutes, where every driver would be able to set a lap within the 15 minutes. Then, the second round would consist of the fastest 24 cars in Round 1, and drivers would have 10 minutes to set a lap. Round 3 consisted of the fastest 12 drivers from Round 2, and the drivers would have 5 minutes to set a time. Whoever was fastest in Round 3 would win the pole.

Cole Custer of Stewart-Haas Racing with Biagi-DenBeste would win the pole after advancing from both preliminary rounds and setting the fastest lap in Round 3, with a time of 28.523 and an average speed of 189.321 miles per hour (304.683 km/h).

Five drivers would fail to qualify: Josh Williams, Stephen Leicht, Josh Bilicki, Bayley Currey, and Tim Viens.

=== Full qualifying results ===
Pos.	#	Driver	Team	Make	Time (R1)	Speed (R1)	Time (R2)	Speed (R2)	Time (R3)	Speed (R3)
1	00	Cole Custer	Stewart-Haas Racing with Biagi-DenBeste	Ford	32.858	164.344	32.520	166.052	32.609	165.598
2	20	Christopher Bell	Joe Gibbs Racing	Toyota	33.215	162.577	32.752	164.875	32.659	165.345
3	42	John Hunter Nemechek	Chip Ganassi Racing	Chevrolet	33.190	162.700	32.970	163.785	32.776	164.755
4	9	Tyler Reddick	JR Motorsports	Chevrolet	33.333	162.002	33.109	163.098	32.820	164.534
5	22	Austin Cindric	Team Penske	Ford	33.465	161.363	32.911	164.079	32.918	164.044
6	7	Justin Allgaier	JR Motorsports	Chevrolet	33.365	161.846	33.097	163.157	32.927	163.999
7	1	Elliott Sadler	JR Motorsports	Chevrolet	33.375	161.798	33.088	163.201	32.989	163.691
8	19	Brandon Jones	Joe Gibbs Racing	Toyota	33.111	163.088	33.105	163.117	33.023	163.522
9	2	Matt Tifft	Richard Childress Racing	Chevrolet	33.243	162.440	33.189	162.705	33.083	163.226
10	21	Daniel Hemric	Richard Childress Racing	Chevrolet	33.652	160.466	33.046	163.409	33.094	163.172
11	16	Ryan Reed	Roush Fenway Racing	Ford	33.427	161.546	33.139	162.950	33.102	163.132
12	18	Ryan Preece	Joe Gibbs Racing	Toyota	33.354	161.900	33.052	163.379	33.183	162.734
Eliminated in Round 2
13	60	Chase Briscoe	Roush Fenway Racing	Ford	33.459	161.392	33.213	162.587	—	—
14	5	Michael Annett	JR Motorsports	Chevrolet	33.354	161.900	33.275	162.284	—	—
15	11	Ryan Truex	Kaulig Racing	Chevrolet	33.153	162.881	33.317	162.079	—	—
16	51	Jeremy Clements	Jeremy Clements Racing	Chevrolet	33.490	161.242	33.339	161.972	—	—
17	23	Spencer Gallagher	GMS Racing	Chevrolet	33.515	161.122	33.430	161.532	—	—
18	61	Kaz Grala	Fury Race Cars	Ford	33.393	161.711	33.454	161.416	—	—
19	38	Ryan Sieg	RSS Racing	Chevrolet	33.392	161.715	33.478	161.300	—	—
20	36	Alex Labbé	DGM Racing	Chevrolet	33.601	160.710	33.531	161.045	—	—
21	3	Shane Lee	Richard Childress Racing	Chevrolet	33.695	160.261	33.533	161.035	—	—
22	26	Max Tullman	Tullman-Walker Racing	Ford	33.650	160.475	33.703	160.223	—	—
23	4	Ross Chastain	JD Motorsports	Chevrolet	33.375	161.798	—	—	—	—
24	89	Landon Cassill	Shepherd Racing Ventures	Chevrolet	33.784	159.839	—	—	—	—
Eliminated in Round 1
25	66	Chad Finchum	MBM Motorsports	Toyota	33.808	159.726	—	—	—	—
26	35	Joey Gase	Go Green Racing with SS-Green Light Racing	Chevrolet	33.867	159.447	—	—	—	—
27	86	Brandon Brown	Brandonbilt Motorsports	Chevrolet	33.960	159.011	—	—	—	—
28	93	J. J. Yeley	RSS Racing	Chevrolet	34.005	158.800	—	—	—	—
29	0	Garrett Smithley	JD Motorsports	Chevrolet	34.236	157.729	—	—	—	—
30	8	Tommy Joe Martins	B. J. McLeod Motorsports	Chevrolet	34.269	157.577	—	—	—	—
31	13	Timmy Hill	MBM Motorsports	Toyota	34.294	157.462	—	—	—	—
32	01	B. J. McLeod	JD Motorsports	Chevrolet	34.303	157.421	—	—	—	—
33	90	Caesar Bacarella	DGM Racing	Chevrolet	34.376	157.086	—	—	—	—
Qualified by owner's points
34	52	David Starr	Jimmy Means Racing	Chevrolet	34.506	156.495	—	—	—	—
35	15	Quin Houff	JD Motorsports	Chevrolet	34.623	155.966	—	—	—	—
36	76	Spencer Boyd	SS-Green Light Racing	Chevrolet	34.820	155.083	—	—	—	—
37	78	Vinnie Miller	B. J. McLeod Motorsports	Chevrolet	35.075	153.956	—	—	—	—
38	40	Carl Long	MBM Motorsports	Dodge	36.592	147.573	—	—	—	—
39	39	Angela Ruch	RSS Racing	Chevrolet	36.817	146.671	—	—	—	—
Champion's Provisional
40	37	Jeff Green	RSS Racing	Chevrolet	34.950	154.506	—	—	—	—
Failed to qualify
41	92	Josh Williams	DGM Racing	Chevrolet	34.647	155.858	—	—	—	—
42	99	Stephen Leicht	B. J. McLeod Motorsports	Chevrolet	34.685	155.687	—	—	—	—
43	45	Josh Bilicki	JP Motorsports	Toyota	34.810	155.128	—	—	—	—
44	55	Bayley Currey	JP Motorsports	Toyota	34.833	155.025	—	—	—	—
45	74	Tim Viens	Mike Harmon Racing	Chevrolet	35.131	153.710	—	—	—	—
Official qualifying results
Official starting lineup

== Race results ==
- Note: Christopher Bell, Cole Custer, Daniel Hemric, and Tyler Reddick are not eligible for stage points because of their participation in the Championship 4.

Stage 1 Laps: 45

Pos.	#	Driver	Team	Make	Pts
1	00	Cole Custer	Stewart-Haas Racing with Biagi-DenBeste	Ford	0
2	21	Daniel Hemric	Richard Childress Racing	Chevrolet	0
3	9	Tyler Reddick	JR Motorsports	Chevrolet	0
4	7	Justin Allgaier	JR Motorsports	Chevrolet	7
5	42	John Hunter Nemechek	Chip Ganassi Racing	Chevrolet	6
6	20	Christopher Bell	Joe Gibbs Racing	Toyota	0
7	22	Austin Cindric	Team Penske	Ford	4
8	18	Ryan Preece	Joe Gibbs Racing	Toyota	3
9	1	Elliott Sadler	JR Motorsports	Chevrolet	2
10	16	Ryan Reed	Roush Fenway Racing	Ford	1

Stage 2 Laps: 45

Pos.	#	Driver	Team	Make	Pts
1	00	Cole Custer	Stewart-Haas Racing with Biagi-DenBeste	Ford	0
2	42	John Hunter Nemechek	Chip Ganassi Racing	Chevrolet	9
3	20	Christopher Bell	Joe Gibbs Racing	Toyota	0
4	21	Daniel Hemric	Richard Childress Racing	Chevrolet	0
5	18	Ryan Preece	Joe Gibbs Racing	Toyota	6
6	7	Justin Allgaier	JR Motorsports	Chevrolet	5
7	22	Austin Cindric	Team Penske	Ford	4
8	9	Tyler Reddick	JR Motorsports	Chevrolet	0
9	1	Elliott Sadler	JR Motorsports	Chevrolet	2
10	19	Brandon Jones	Joe Gibbs Racing	Toyota	1

Stage 3 Laps: 110

Fin	St	#	Driver	Team	Make	Laps	Led	Status	Pts
1	4	9	Tyler Reddick	JR Motorsports	Chevrolet	200	44	running	40
2	1	00	Cole Custer	Stewart-Haas Racing with Biagi-DenBeste	Ford	200	95	running	35
3	3	42	John Hunter Nemechek	Chip Ganassi Racing	Chevrolet	200	52	running	49
4	10	21	Daniel Hemric	Richard Childress Racing	Chevrolet	200	0	running	33
5	5	22	Austin Cindric	Team Penske	Ford	200	0	running	40
6	12	18	Ryan Preece	Joe Gibbs Racing	Toyota	200	0	running	40
7	6	7	Justin Allgaier	JR Motorsports	Chevrolet	200	0	running	42
8	8	19	Brandon Jones	Joe Gibbs Racing	Toyota	199	0	running	30
9	14	5	Michael Annett	JR Motorsports	Chevrolet	199	0	running	28
10	9	2	Matt Tifft	Richard Childress Racing	Chevrolet	199	0	running	27
11	2	20	Christopher Bell	Joe Gibbs Racing	Toyota	199	9	running	26
12	11	16	Ryan Reed	Roush Fenway Racing	Ford	199	0	running	26
13	13	60	Chase Briscoe	Roush Fenway Racing	Ford	199	0	running	24
14	7	1	Elliott Sadler	JR Motorsports	Chevrolet	199	0	running	27
15	15	11	Ryan Truex	Kaulig Racing	Chevrolet	199	0	running	22
16	23	4	Ross Chastain	JD Motorsports	Chevrolet	199	0	running	21
17	17	23	Spencer Gallagher	GMS Racing	Chevrolet	198	0	running	20
18	18	61	Kaz Grala	Fury Race Cars	Ford	198	0	running	19
19	16	51	Jeremy Clements	Jeremy Clements Racing	Chevrolet	198	0	running	18
20	21	3	Shane Lee	Richard Childress Racing	Chevrolet	198	0	running	17
21	20	36	Alex Labbé	DGM Racing	Chevrolet	197	0	running	16
22	19	38	Ryan Sieg	RSS Racing	Chevrolet	197	0	running	15
23	26	35	Joey Gase	Go Green Racing with SS-Green Light Racing	Chevrolet	196	0	running	14
24	27	86	Brandon Brown	Brandonbilt Motorsports	Chevrolet	196	0	running	13
25	22	26	Max Tullman	Tullman-Walker Racing	Ford	195	0	running	12
26	30	8	Tommy Joe Martins	B. J. McLeod Motorsports	Chevrolet	195	0	running	11
27	29	0	Garrett Smithley	JD Motorsports	Chevrolet	194	0	running	10
28	34	52	David Starr	Jimmy Means Racing	Chevrolet	194	0	running	9
29	35	15	Quin Houff	JD Motorsports	Chevrolet	191	0	running	8
30	36	76	Spencer Boyd	SS-Green Light Racing	Chevrolet	189	0	running	7
31	25	66	Chad Finchum	MBM Motorsports	Toyota	187	0	handling	6
32	32	01	B. J. McLeod	JD Motorsports	Chevrolet	185	0	running	5
33	38	40	Carl Long	MBM Motorsports	Dodge	180	0	running	4
34	33	90	Caesar Bacarella	DGM Racing	Chevrolet	161	0	overheating	3
35	31	13	Timmy Hill	MBM Motorsports	Toyota	54	0	brakes	2
36	28	93	J. J. Yeley	RSS Racing	Chevrolet	46	0	rear gear	1
37	39	39	Angela Ruch	RSS Racing	Chevrolet	36	0	parked	1
38	24	89	Landon Cassill	Shepherd Racing Ventures	Chevrolet	16	0	suspension	1
39	40	37	Jeff Green	RSS Racing	Chevrolet	14	0	brakes	1
40	37	78	Vinnie Miller	B. J. McLeod Motorsports	Chevrolet	10	0	clutch	1
Failed to qualify
41		92	Josh Williams	DGM Racing	Chevrolet				
42		99	Stephen Leicht	B. J. McLeod Motorsports	Chevrolet				
43		45	Josh Bilicki	JP Motorsports	Toyota				
44		55	Bayley Currey	JP Motorsports	Toyota				
45		74	Tim Viens	Mike Harmon Racing	Chevrolet				
Official race results

Previous race: 2018 Whelen Trusted to Perform 200	NASCAR Xfinity Series; 2018 season	Next race: 2019 NASCAR Racing Experience 300
