= Tullman =

Tullman may refer to:

== People ==
- Glen Tullman, American entrepreneur
- Howard A. Tullman (born 1945), American entrepreneur
- Max Tullman (born 1997), American racing driver

== Other uses ==
- Tullman-Walker Racing, American racing team
