= Alex Labbé =

Canadian racing driver (born 1993)

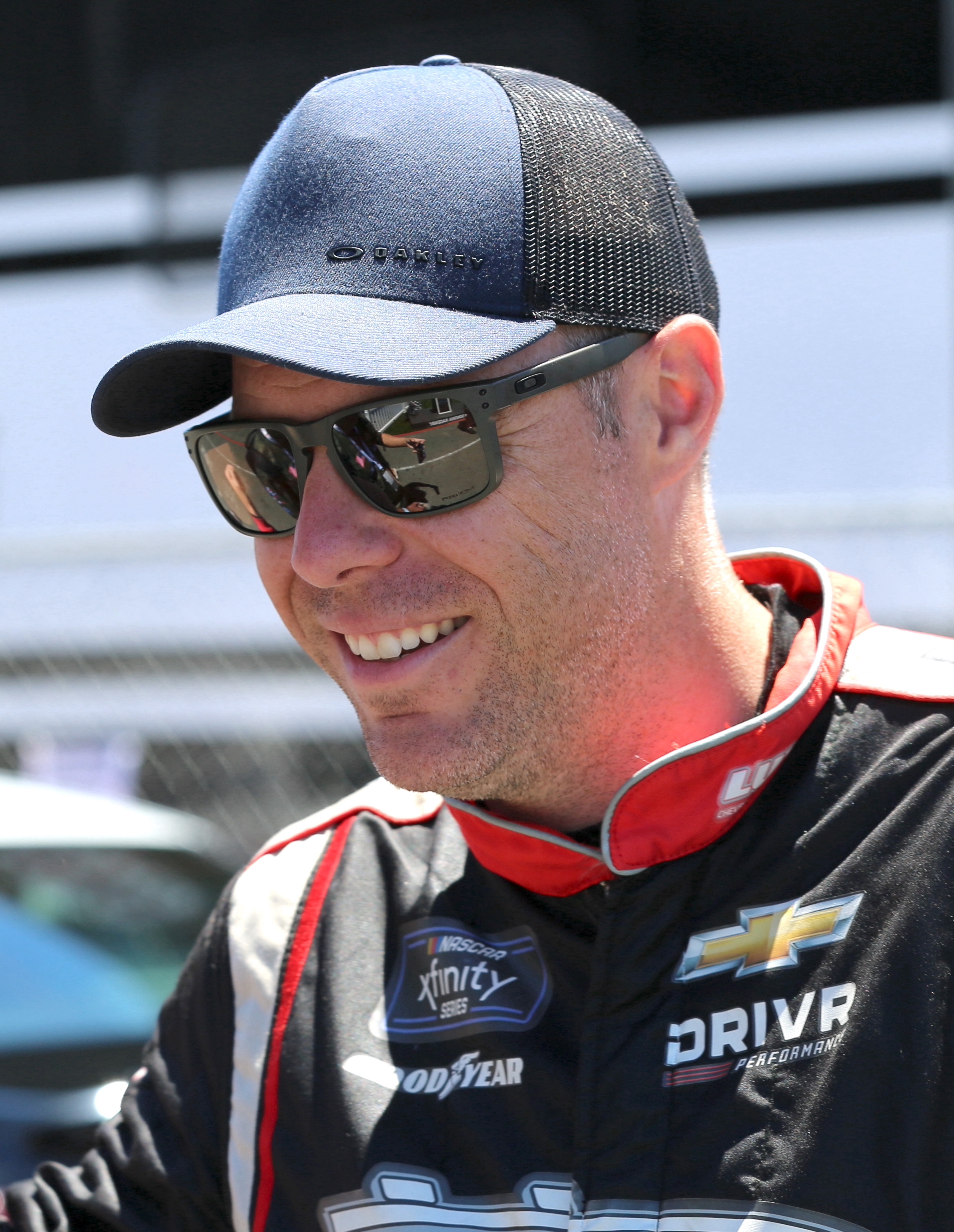
- Labbé at Sonoma Raceway in 2026
- Born: April 29, 1993 (age 33); Saint-Albert, Quebec, Canada
- Achievements: 2017 NASCAR Pinty's Series Champion

NASCAR O'Reilly Auto Parts Series career
- 170 races run over 11 years
- 2026 position: 34th
- Best finish: 14th (2020)
- First race: 2016 Ticket Galaxy 200 (Phoenix)
- Last race: 2026 National Debt Relief 250 (Martinsville)
Wins	Top tens	Poles
0	13	0

NASCAR FedEx Freight Truck Series career
- 1 race run over 1 year
- 2025 position: 106th
- Best finish: 106th (2025)
- First race: 2025 LiUNA! 150 (Lime Rock)
Wins	Top tens	Poles
0	0	0

NASCAR Canada Series career
- 76 races run over 13 years
- Car no., team: No. 36 (LL Motorsports)
- 2026 position: 18th
- Best finish: 1st (2017)
- First race: 2012 ICAR Lucas Oil Grand Prix (ICAR)
- Last race: 2026 Le Tours 45 CarGurus (Trois-Rivières)
- First win: 2016 CRS Express 300 (Chaudiere)
- Last win: 2017 Lucas Oil 250 (St-Eustache)
Wins	Top tens	Poles
6	55	10
- Statistics up to date as of November 7, 2026.

Alex Labbé (born April 29, 1993) is a Canadian professional stock car racing driver. He last competed part-time in the NASCAR O'Reilly Auto Parts Series, driving the No. 0 Chevrolet Camaro SS for SS-Green Light Racing with BRK Racing, and the No. 91/92 Chevrolet Camaro SS for DGM Racing with Jesse Iwuji Motorsports, and part-time in the NASCAR Canada Series, driving the No. 36 Chevrolet for LL Motorsports. He is the 2017 NASCAR Pinty's Series champion. He has also competed in Quebec's ACT Series and in the PASS North Series.

== Racing career ==
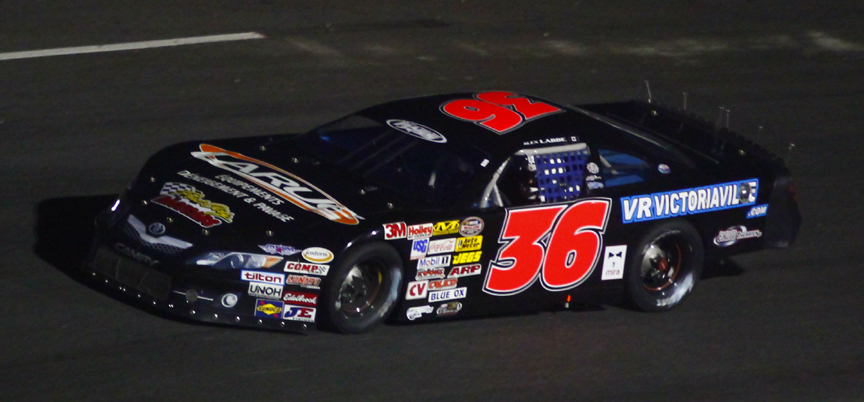
Labbé at Autodrome Chaudière in 2013

=== Early years ===
Labbé was the rookie of the year and champion of Quebec's Super Truck Series in 2009, rookie of the year in Quebec's ACT Series in 2010, and vice-champion in 2013. He won three races in Quebec's ACT Series and two in the US-based ACT Tour.

In 2014, Labbé became the youngest champion of Quebec's ACT Series at the age of 21. He also picked up his first two wins in the PASS North Series.

=== Canada Series ===
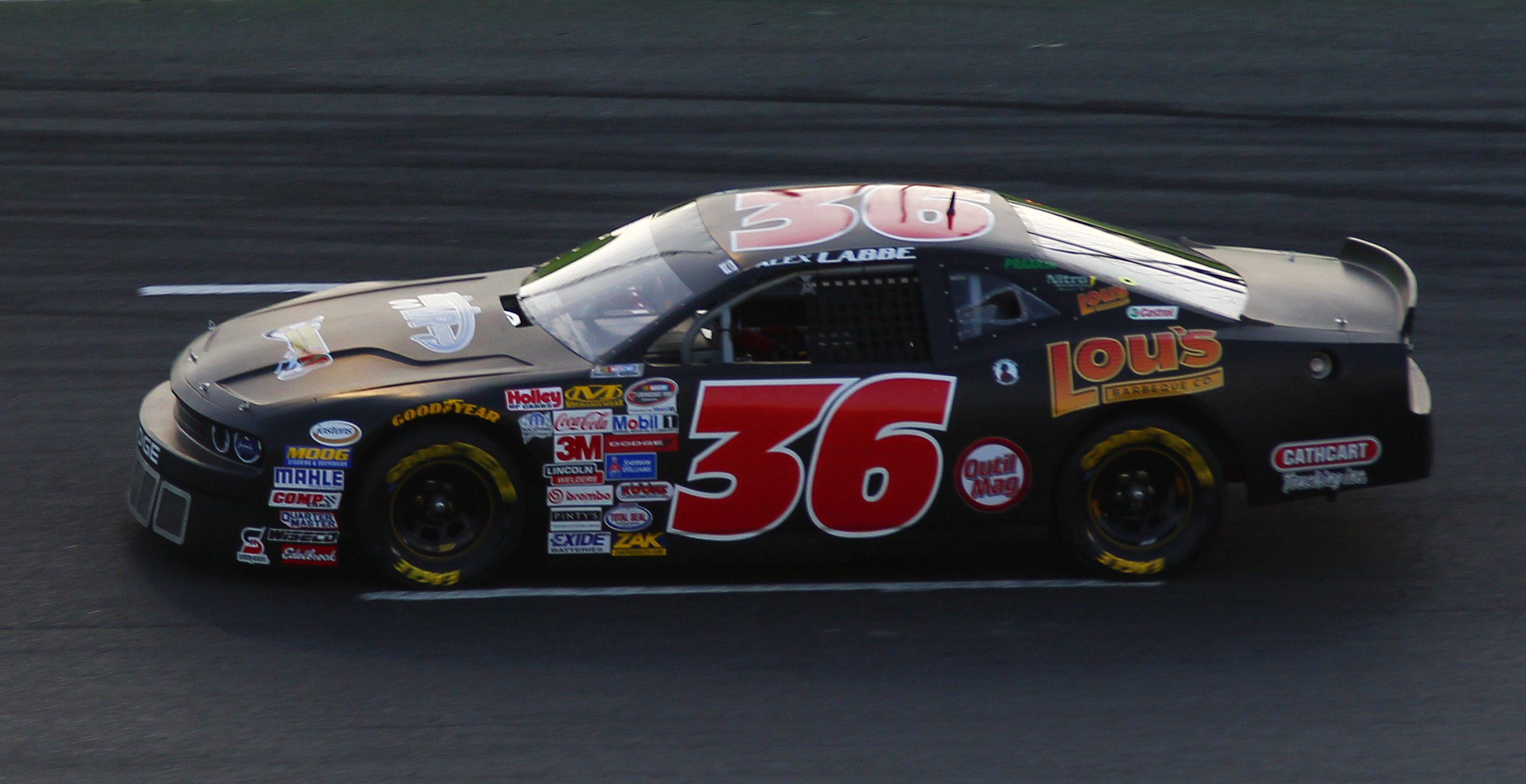
Labbé's No. 36 car at Autodrome Chaudière in 2015

Labbé finished sixth in his first start in the NASCAR Canadian Tire Series at Circuit ICAR in 2012. He continued to run sporadically with his family team, but then scored a pole in his first start with Dave Jacombs at Autodrome Saint-Eustache in 2014. However, Labbe fell out of the race with suspension problems. Running part-time with Jacombs again in 2015, Labbe scored another pole, this one at Autodrome Chaudière, and finished a career-high second. Labbe drove for Go Fas Racing in 2016, running the full schedule for the first time in the No. 32 Can-Am Ford, grabbing four poles and winning what some say was the best race ever in the Pinty's Series, at Autodrome Chaudiere over Cayden Lapcevich by just over .3 seconds. After finishing seventh in championship points in 2016, Labbe will return to the No. 32 in 2017. In 2018, he only drove for one race with Jacombs Racing at Circuit Trois-Rivières, where he finished third. In 2019, he drove for Jacombs Racing for a full-time season, excluding the final race, which was run by Sam Charland. He finished eighth in the standings.

=== O'Reilly Auto Parts Series ===
Labbé made his Xfinity Series debut at Phoenix International Raceway in November 2016, driving the No. 90 Chevrolet Camaro for King Autosport. He finished 23rd. It was announced in April 2017 that he would make his second start at Texas Motor Speedway, with the same team he drove in 2016.

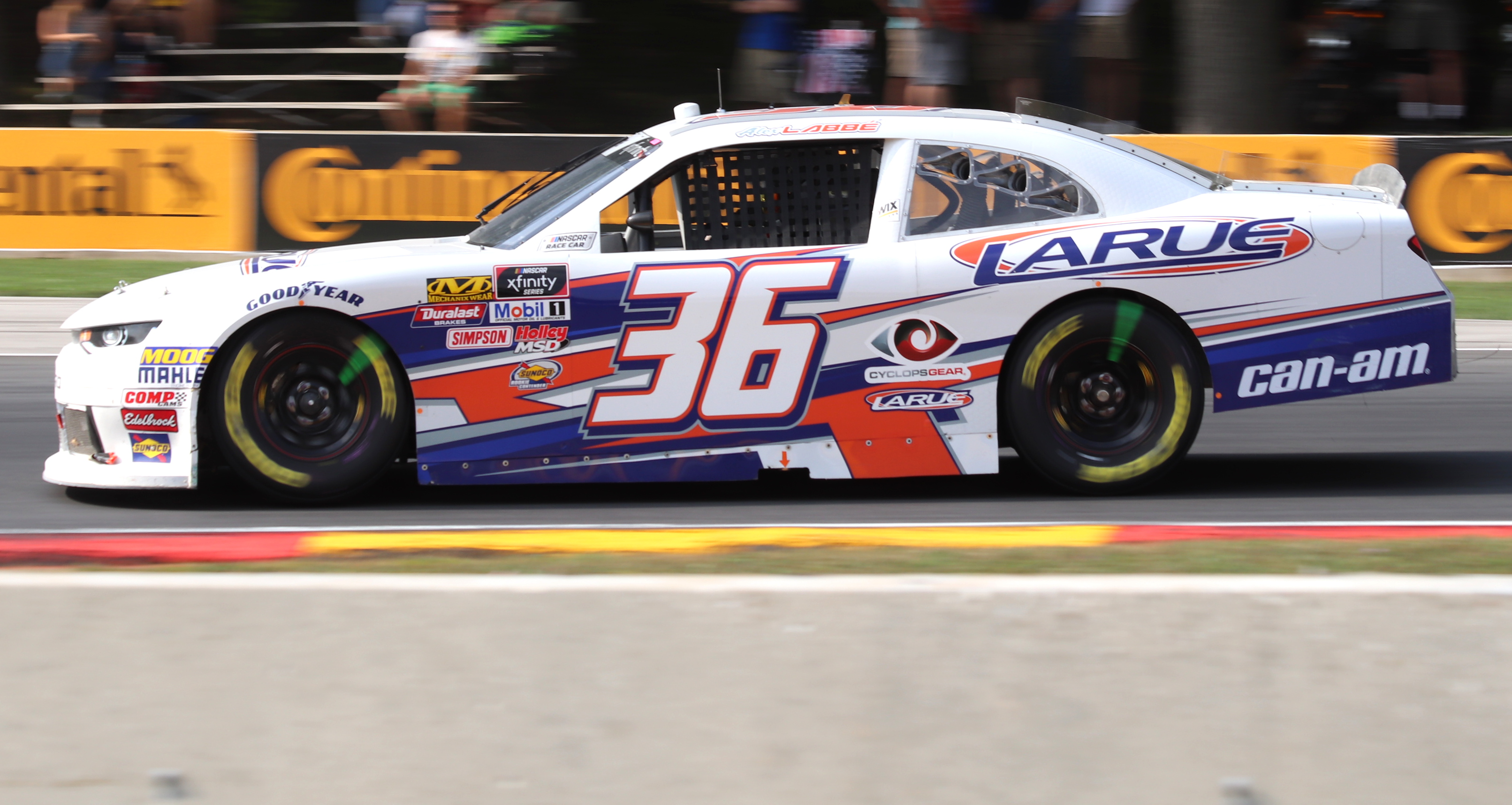
Labbé driving at Road America in 2018

In 2018, Labbé partnered with DGM Racing to drive the No. 36 Camaro full-time in the Xfinity Series.

Labbé returned for a limited schedule in the No. 90 car the following year for DGM, and finished sixth at the Charlotte Motor Speedway Roval in September.

In 2020, Labbé returned to No. 36 for a majority of races, while he ran No. 90 for the events in which No. 36 was not entered or had other drivers. In August, Labbé received a penalty for driving an Xfinity car in a Sports Car Club of America practice session at the Daytona Road Course ahead of the Xfinity Series race there, a violation of NASCAR's testing policy; the penalty resulted in him and his No. 36 team losing 75 points each and the latter being fined $50,000. The team appealed the ruling to the National Motorsports Appeals Panel, which rescinded the punishment.

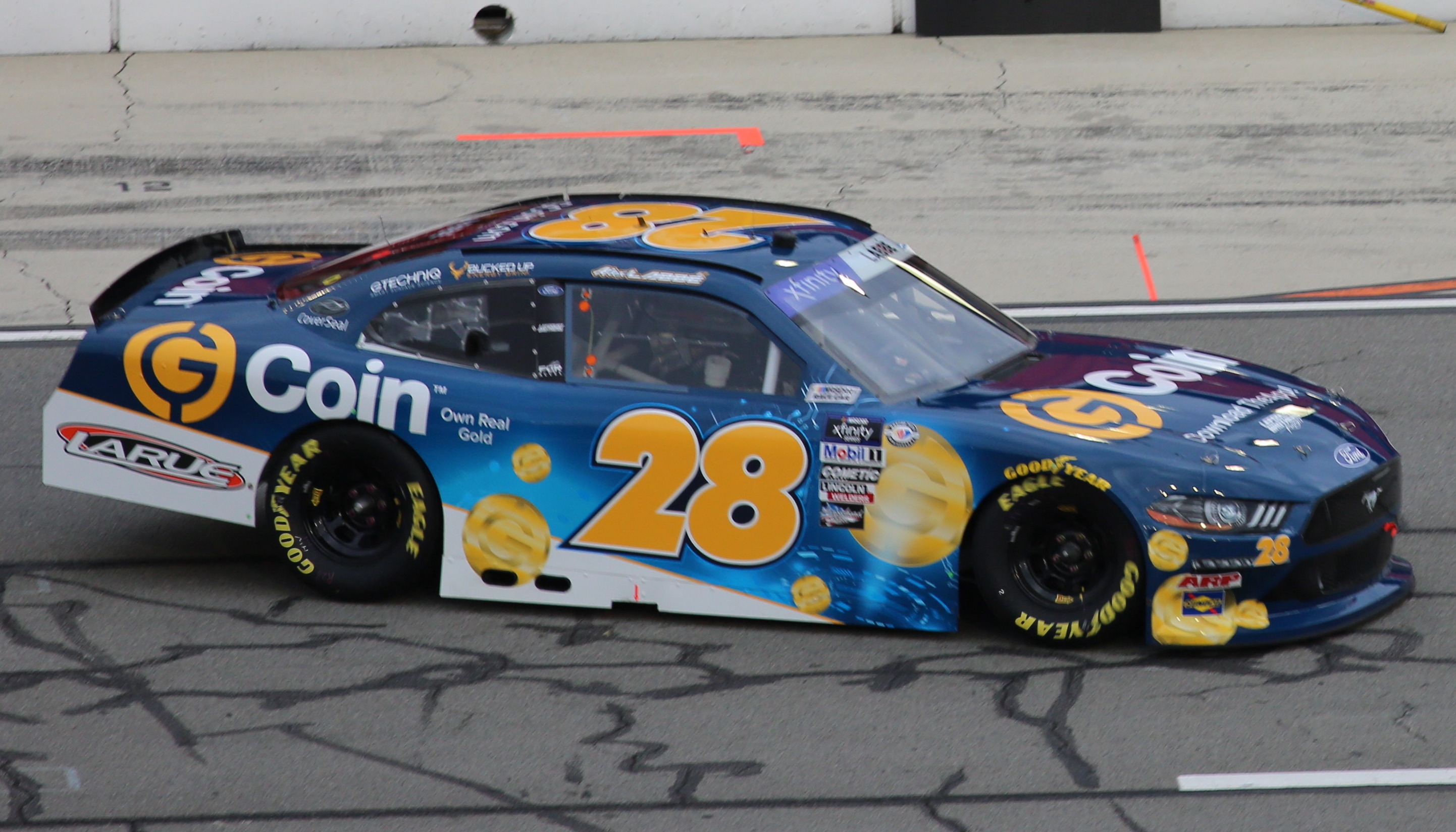
Labbé at Auto Club Speedway in 2023

A full season in the No. 36 came in 2021. He finished 19th in points with three top-tens.

In 2022, Labbé returned to the No. 90 at Daytona, which was his first ever DNQ, before moving on to his old No. 36, which was driven by Spire Motorsports star Josh Bilicki at Daytona. Despite the lack of sponsorship, he ran every race after Daytona until Charlotte. Garrett Smithley would replace Labbe at Charlotte, since Smithley had sufficient sponsorship.

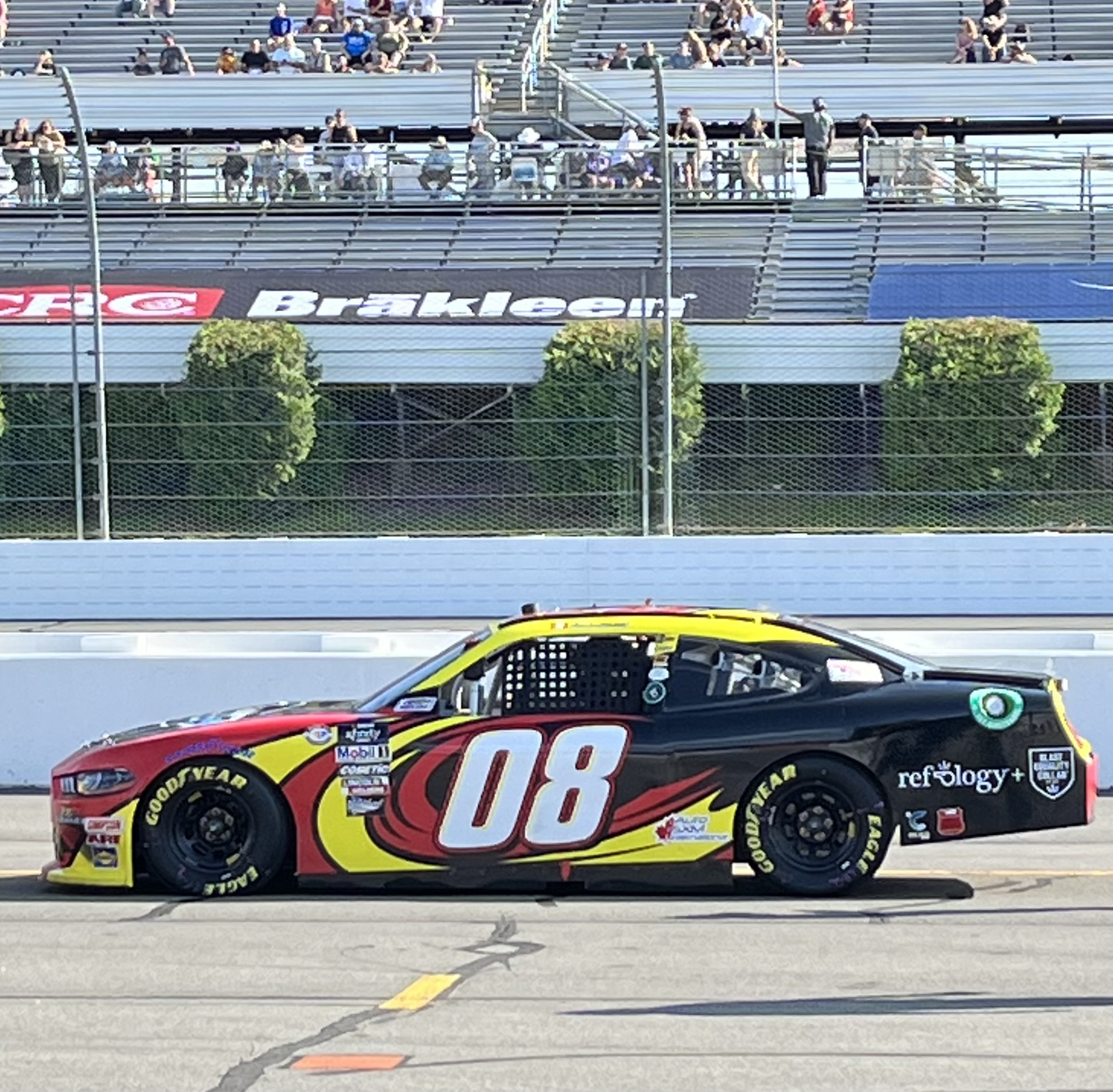
Labbé at Pocono Raceway in 2023

In 2023, Labbé would once again fail to qualify for the season opener and would run for RSS Racing in the No. 28 Ford for the next two races, which would be the first time he drove for another team rather than DGM in the Xfinity Series. He would also drive a new part-time fourth RSS car, the No. 29, in its first attempt at Sonoma. He would also compete for Emerling-Gase Motorsports and SS-Green Light Racing.

== Motorsports career results ==
=== NASCAR ===
(key) (Bold – Pole position awarded by qualifying time. Italics – Pole position earned by points standings or practice time. * – Most laps led.)

==== O'Reilly Auto Parts Series ====
NASCAR O'Reilly Auto Parts Series results
Year	Team	No.	Make	1	2	3	4	5	6	7	8	9	10	11	12	13	14	15	16	17	18	19	20	21	22	23	24	25	26	27	28	29	30	31	32	33	NOAPSC	Pts	Ref
2016	King Autosport	90	Chevy	DAY	ATL	LVS	PHO	CAL	TEX	BRI	RCH	TAL	DOV	CLT	POC	MCH	IOW	DAY	KEN	NHA	IND	IOW	GLN	MOH	BRI	ROA	DAR	RCH	CHI	KEN	DOV	CLT	KAN	TEX	PHO; 23	HOM	67th	18	
2017	King Autosport	90	Chevy	DAY	ATL	LVS	PHO	CAL	TEX; 28	BRI	RCH	TAL	CLT; 33	DOV	POC	MCH	IOW	DAY	KEN	NHA	IND	IOW	GLN	MOH	BRI	ROA	DAR	RCH	CHI	KEN	DOV	CLT	KAN	TEX	PHO	HOM	67th	13	
2018	DGM Racing	36	Chevy	DAY; 24	ATL; 18	LVS; 17	PHO; 22	CAL; 19	TEX; 32	BRI; 11	RCH; 16	TAL; 24	DOV; 21	CLT; 34	POC; 18	MCH; 37	IOW; 23	CHI; 21	DAY; 15	KEN; 32	NHA; 23	IOW; 16	GLN; 19	MOH; 9	BRI; 23	ROA; 16	DAR; 19	IND; 19	LVS; 16	RCH; 21	ROV; 13	DOV; 21	KAN; 12	TEX; 30	PHO; 20	HOM; 21	17th	540	
2019	DGM Racing	90	Chevy	DAY	ATL; 19	LVS	PHO	CAL	TEX	BRI; 31	RCH	TAL; 25	DOV	CLT	POC	MCH	IOW	CHI	DAY	KEN	NHA; 22	IOW	GLN; 16	MOH	BRI	ROA	DAR; 17	IND	LVS; 17	RCH	ROV; 6	DOV	KAN; 15	TEX	PHO	HOM; 18	30th	195	
2020	DGM Racing	36	Chevy	DAY; 10			PHO; 22		CLT; 16	BRI; 33		HOM; 25	HOM; 23	TAL; 9			KEN; 24	KEN; 24							DAY; 30	DAR; 16	RCH; 23	RCH; 12	BRI; 13	LVS; 32	TAL; 10	ROV; 4	KAN; 23	TEX; 11	MAR; 27	PHO; 21	14th	609	
2020	DGM Racing	90	Chevy		LVS; 18	CAL; 13		DAR; 17			ATL; 27				POC; 17	IRC; 8			TEX; 31	KAN; 21	ROA; 15	DRC; 27	DOV; 19	DOV; 17													14th	609	
2021	DGM Racing	36	Chevy	DAY; 40	DRC; 22	HOM; 15	LVS; 35	PHO; 32	ATL; 17	MAR; 31	TAL; 21	DAR; 10	DOV; 19	COA; 20	CLT; 14	MOH; 11	TEX; 18	NSH; 17	POC; 16	ROA; 21	ATL; 15	NHA; 36	GLN; 39	IRC; 13	MCH; 31	DAY; 31	DAR; 10	RCH; 19	BRI; 19	LVS; 38	TAL; 21	ROV; 14	TEX; 24	KAN; 33	MAR; 8	PHO; 30	19th	502	
2022	DGM Racing	90	Chevy	DAY; DNQ																																	19th	461	
2022	DGM Racing	36	Chevy		CAL; 24	LVS; 15	PHO; 19	ATL; 19	COA; 36	RCH; 19	MAR; 15	TAL; 12	DOV; 19	DAR; 19	TEX; 33	CLT	PIR; 10	NSH; 23	ROA; 15	ATL; 23	NHA; 27	POC; 37	IRC; 12	MCH; 26	GLN; 35	DAY; 8	DAR	KAN	BRI; 26			ROV; 6	LVS		MAR; 13		19th	461	
2022	DGM Racing	92	Chevy																											TEX; 17	TAL			HOM; DNQ		PHO; 18	19th	461	
2023	DGM Racing	36	Chevy	DAY; DNQ																																	30th	246	
2023	RSS Racing	28	Ford		CAL; 28	LVS; 18	PHO	ATL																													30th	246	
2023	DGM Racing	92	Chevy						COA; 15																												30th	246	
2023	DGM Racing	91	Chevy							RCH; 11	MAR; 26	TAL	DOV	DAR	CLT	PIR; 11					NHA; 12											ROV; 15	LVS	HOM	MAR	PHO	30th	246	
2023	RSS Racing	29	Ford														SON; 25	NSH																			30th	246	
2023	Emerling-Gase Motorsports	35	Toyota																CSC; 21	ATL					IRC; 11												30th	246	
2023	SS-Green Light Racing	08	Ford																			POC; 28	ROA; 33	MCH													30th	246	
2023	SS-Green Light Racing	08	Chevy																							GLN; 24	DAY	DAR	KAN	BRI	TEX						30th	246	
2024	Joey Gase Motorsports	35	Toyota	DAY	ATL	LVS	PHO	COA; 26	RCH	MAR	TEX	TAL	DOV	DAR	CLT	PIR																					44th	69	
2024	SS-Green Light Racing	07	Chevy														SON; 20	IOW	NHA	NSH	CSC; 29	POC	IND	MCH	DAY	DAR	ATL	GLN	BRI	KAN	TAL						44th	69	
2024	DGM Racing	91	Chevy																													ROV; 14	LVS	HOM	MAR	PHO	44th	69	
2025	SS-Green Light Racing	07	Chevy	DAY	ATL	COA; 14	PHO	LVS	HOM	MAR	DAR	BRI; 35	CAR	TAL	TEX	CLT	NSH	MXC; 15	POC	ATL	CSC; 12	SON; 37	DOV	IND	IOW	GLN	DAY	PIR; 36	GTW	BRI	KAN	ROV; 30	LVS	TAL	MAR	PHO	40th	97	
2026	SS-Green Light Racing with BRK Racing	0	Chevy	DAY	ATL	COA; 13	PHO	LVS								GLN; 19	DOV	CLT	NSH	POC	COR; 27	SON; 19	CHI	ATL	IND	IOW	DAY	DAR	GTW	BRI	LVS	CLT	PHO	TAL			34th	108	
2026	DGM Racing with Jesse Iwuji Motorsports	91	Chevy						DAR; 38	MAR	CAR; 18	BRI	KAN	TAL	TEX																						34th	108	
2026	DGM Racing with Jesse Iwuji Motorsports	92	Chevy																																MAR; 22	HOM	34th	108	

==== Craftsman Truck Series ====
NASCAR Craftsman Truck Series results
Year	Team	No.	Make	1	2	3	4	5	6	7	8	9	10	11	12	13	14	15	16	17	18	19	20	21	22	23	24	25	NCTC	Pts	Ref
2025	Reaume Brothers Racing	22	Ford	DAY	ATL	LVS	HOM	MAR	BRI	CAR	TEX	KAN	NWS	CLT	NSH	MCH	POC	LRP; 34	IRP	GLN	RCH	DAR	BRI	NHA	ROV	TAL	MAR	PHO	106th	0^{1}	

^{*} Season still in progress
^{1} Ineligible for series points

==== Canada Series ====
NASCAR Canada Series results
Year	Team	No.	Make	1	2	3	4	5	6	7	8	9	10	11	12	13	14	NCSC	Pts	Ref
2012	Ghislain Labbé	36	Dodge	MSP	ICAR; 6	MSP	DEL	MPS	EDM	SAS	CTR; 31	CGV; 30	BAR	RIS	KWA			38th	65	
2013	Ghislain Labbé	36	Dodge	MSP	DEL	MSP	ICAR; 11	MPS	SAS	ASE	CTR; 8	RIS	MSP	BAR	KWA			32nd	70	
2014	Ghislain Labbé	36	Dodge	MSP	ACD	ICAR; 4	EIR	SAS		CTR; 15								20th	139	
2014	Jacombs Racing	72	Dodge						**ASE**; 16		RIS; 2	MSP	BAR	KWA				20th	139	
2015	Jacombs Racing	36	Dodge	MSP; 27	**ACD**; 2	SSS; 7	ICAR; 6	EIR	SAS	ASE; 11	CTR; 4	RIS	MSP; 23	KWA				13th	229	
2016	Go Fas Racing	32	Ford	**MSP**; 5	SSS; 15	**ACD**; 1*	**ICAR**; 2	TOR; 12	EIR; 7	SAS; 3	CTR; 4	RIS; 12	MSP; 23	ASE; 9	KWA; 3			7th	423	
2017	Go Fas Racing	32	Ford	MSP; 5	DEL; 1	ACD; 2	ICAR; 4	TOR; 4	SAS; 1*	SAS; 3	**EIR**; 1*	CTR; 5	RIS; 1	MSP; 6	ASE; 1*	JUK; 20		1st	542	
2018	Jacombs Racing	36	Chevy	MSP	JUK	ACD	TOR	SAS	SAS	EIR	CTR; 3	RIS	MSP	ASE	NHA	JUK		36th	41	
2019	Jacombs Racing	36	Ford	MSP; 7	JUK; 13	ACD; 3	TOR; 18	SAS; 4	SAS; 10	EIR; 4	CTR; 19	RIS; 5	MSP; 22	ASE; 4*	NHA; 2	JUK		8th	420	
2022	Dumoulin Compétition	07	Dodge	SUN	MSP	ACD	AVE	TOR	EDM	SAS	SAS	CTR	OSK	ICAR; 4	MSP			30th	78	
2022	Jacombs Racing	36	Ford													DEL; 6		30th	78	
2023	Jacombs Racing	24	Ford	SUN	MSP	ACD	AVE; 2											21st	147	
2023	Jacombs Racing	36	Chevy					TOR	EDM	SAS	SAS	CTR; 23	OSK	OSK	ICAR; 2	MSP; 5	DEL	21st	147	
2024	LL Motorsports	36	Chevy	MSP; 5	ACD; 19	AVE	RIS	**RIS**; 7	OSK	SAS	EIR	CTR; 2	ICAR; 5	MSP; 22	DEL	AMS		11th	281	
2025	LL Motorsports	36	Chevy	MSP	RIS	EDM	SAS	CMP	ACD; 6	CTR; 9	ICAR; 6	MSP	DEL	DEL	**AMS**; 3			16th	153	
2026	LL Motorsports	36	Chevy	MSP	ACD; 4	ACD; 4	RIS	AMS; 19	AMS; 7	CMP	EIR	EIR	CTR; 23	MAR	ICAR			18th	167	
2026	Larry Jackson Racing	99	Dodge													MSP; PR^{†}	DEL	18th	167	
^{†} – Practiced for Matthew Scannell
