= 2019 B&L Transport 170 =

Race details
- Race 21 of 33 in the 2019 NASCAR Xfinity Series season
- Date: August 10, 2019
- Location: Mid-Ohio Sports Car Course in Lexington, Ohio
- Course: Permanent racing facility
- Course length: 2.258 miles (3.634 km)
- Distance: 75 laps, 169.35 mi (272.54 km)

Pole position
Driver	Austin Cindric	Team Penske
- Time: 84.231

Most laps led
Driver	Austin Cindric	Team Penske
- Laps: 46

Winner
No. 22	Austin Cindric	Team Penske

Television in the United States
- Network: NBCSN

Radio in the United States
- Radio: MRN

The 2019 B&L Transport 170 is a NASCAR Xfinity Series race held on August 10, 2019, at Mid-Ohio Sports Car Course in Lexington, Ohio. Contested over 75 laps on the 2.26-mile (3.64 km) road course, it was the 21st race of the 2019 NASCAR Xfinity Series season.

== Background ==
=== Track ===
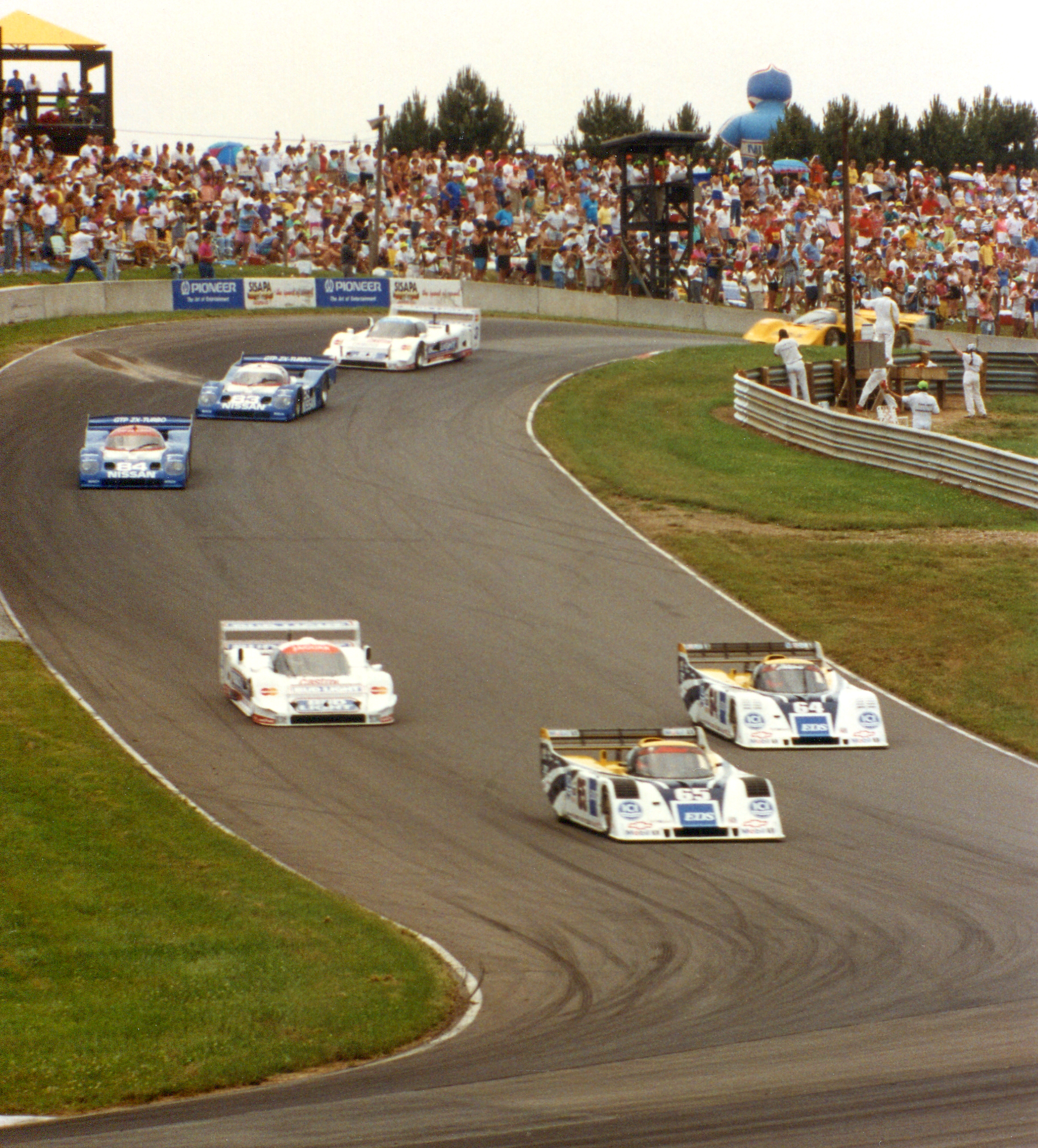
IMSA GTP cars competing at Mid-Ohio in 1991

The track is a road course auto racing facility located in Troy Township, Morrow County, Ohio, United States, just outside the village of Lexington. Mid-Ohio has also colloquially become a term for the entire north-central region of the state, from south of Sandusky to the north of Columbus.

The track opened as a 15-turn, 2.4 mile (3.86 km) road circuit run clockwise. The back portion of the track allows speeds approaching 180 mph (290 km/h). A separate starting line is located on the backstretch to allow for safer rolling starts. The regular start / finish line is located on the pit straight. There is grandstand seating for 10,000 spectators and three observation mounds alongside the track raise the capacity to over 75,000.

== Entry list ==
No.	Driver	Team	Manufacturer
00	Cole Custer	Stewart-Haas Racing with Biagi-DenBeste Racing	Ford
0	Garrett Smithley	JD Motorsports	Chevrolet
01	Stephen Leicht	JD Motorsports	Chevrolet
1	Michael Annett	JR Motorsports	Chevrolet
2	Tyler Reddick	Richard Childress Racing	Chevrolet
4	Lawson Aschenbach	JD Motorsports	Chevrolet
5	Vinnie Miller	B. J. McLeod Motorsports	Chevrolet
07	Ray Black Jr.	SS-Green Light Racing	Chevrolet
7	Justin Allgaier	JR Motorsports	Chevrolet
08	Gray Gaulding (R)	SS-Green Light Racing	Chevrolet
8	Regan Smith	JR Motorsports	Chevrolet
9	Noah Gragson (R)	JR Motorsports	Chevrolet
10	A. J. Allmendinger	Kaulig Racing	Chevrolet
11	Justin Haley (R)	Kaulig Racing	Chevrolet
13	Chad Finchum	MBM Motorsports	Toyota
15	B. J. McLeod	JD Motorsports	Chevrolet
18	Jack Hawksworth	Joe Gibbs Racing	Toyota
19	Brandon Jones	Joe Gibbs Racing	Toyota
20	Christopher Bell	Joe Gibbs Racing	Toyota
22	Austin Cindric	Team Penske	Ford
23	John Hunter Nemechek (R)	GMS Racing	Chevrolet
35	Joey Gase	MBM Motorsports	Toyota
36	Josh Williams	DGM Racing	Chevrolet
38	J. J. Yeley (i)	RSS Racing	Chevrolet
39	Ryan Sieg	RSS Racing	Chevrolet
42	Timmy Hill	MBM Motorsports	Toyota
51	Jeremy Clements	Jeremy Clements Racing	Chevrolet
52	David Starr	Jimmy Means Racing	Chevrolet
53	Max Tullman	Jimmy Means Racing	Chevrolet
66	Tommy Joe Martins	MBM Motorsports	Toyota
68	Brandon Brown (R)	Brandonbilt Motorsports	Chevrolet
74	Aaron Quine	Mike Harmon Racing	Chevrolet
78	Scott Heckert	B. J. McLeod Motorsports	Toyota
86	Will Rodgers	Brandonbilt Motorsports	Chevrolet
90	Chris Dyson (i)	DGM Racing	Chevrolet
93	Josh Bilicki	RSS Racing	Chevrolet
98	Chase Briscoe (R)	Stewart-Haas Racing with Biagi-DenBeste Racing	Ford
99	Patrick Gallagher	B. J. McLeod Motorsports	Toyota

== Practice ==
=== First practice ===
Justin Haley was the fastest in the first practice session with a time of 85.386 seconds and a speed of 95.201 mph (153.211 km/h).

Pos	No.	Driver	Team	Manufacturer	Time	Speed
1	11	Justin Haley (R)	Kaulig Racing	Chevrolet	85.386	95.201
2	20	Christopher Bell	Joe Gibbs Racing	Toyota	85.831	94.707
3	00	Cole Custer	Stewart-Haas Racing with Biagi-DenBeste Racing	Ford	85.969	94.555

=== Final practice ===
Jack Hawksworth was the fastest in the final practice session with a time of 85.383 seconds and a speed of 95.204 mph (153.216 km/h).

Pos	No.	Driver	Team	Manufacturer	Time	Speed
1	18	Jack Hawksworth	Joe Gibbs Racing	Toyota	85.383	95.204
2	22	Austin Cindric	Team Penske	Ford	85.609	94.953
3	20	Christopher Bell	Joe Gibbs Racing	Toyota	85.613	94.948

== Qualifying ==
Austin Cindric scored the pole for the race with a time of 84.231 seconds and a speed of 96.506 mph (155.311 km/h).

=== Qualifying results ===
Pos	No	Driver	Team	Manufacturer	Time
1	22	Austin Cindric	Team Penske	Ford	84.231
2	18	Jack Hawksworth	Joe Gibbs Racing	Toyota	84.526
3	20	Christopher Bell	Joe Gibbs Racing	Toyota	84.862
4	00	Cole Custer	Stewart-Haas Racing with Biagi-DenBeste Racing	Ford	84.869
5	98	Chase Briscoe (R)	Stewart-Haas Racing with Biagi-DenBeste Racing	Ford	84.872
6	10	A. J. Allmendinger	Kaulig Racing	Chevrolet	84.927
7	9	Noah Gragson (R)	JR Motorsports	Chevrolet	85.089
8	7	Justin Allgaier	JR Motorsports	Chevrolet	85.324
9	19	Brandon Jones	Joe Gibbs Racing	Toyota	85.546
10	2	Tyler Reddick	Richard Childress Racing	Chevrolet	85.650
11	51	Jeremy Clements	Jeremy Clements Racing	Chevrolet	85.653
12	8	Regan Smith	JR Motorsports	Chevrolet	85.141
13	11	Justin Haley (R)	Kaulig Racing	Chevrolet	85.456
14	39	Ryan Sieg	RSS Racing	Chevrolet	85.537
15	23	John Hunter Nemechek (R)	GMS Racing	Chevrolet	85.690
16	08	Gray Gaulding (R)	SS-Green Light Racing	Chevrolet	85.925
17	78	Scott Heckert	B. J. McLeod Motorsports	Toyota	86.007
18	66	Tommy Joe Martins	MBM Motorsports	Toyota	86.036
19	4	Lawson Aschenbach	JD Motorsports	Chevrolet	86.069
20	93	Josh Bilicki	RSS Racing	Chevrolet	86.079
21	1	Michael Annett	JR Motorsports	Chevrolet	86.315
22	86	Will Rodgers	Brandonbilt Motorsports	Chevrolet	86.346
23	36	Josh Williams	DGM Racing	Chevrolet	86.897
24	01	Stephen Leicht	JD Motorsports	Chevrolet	86.946
25	42	Timmy Hill	MBM Motorsports	Toyota	86.984
26	07	Ray Black Jr.	SS-Green Light Racing	Chevrolet	87.216
27	90	Chris Dyson (i)	DGM Racing	Chevrolet	87.429
28	0	Garrett Smithley	JD Motorsports	Chevrolet	87.598
29	52	David Starr	Jimmy Means Racing	Chevrolet	87.730
30	35	Joey Gase	MBM Motorsports	Toyota	88.585
31	74	Aaron Quine	Mike Harmon Racing	Chevrolet	88.615
32	68	Brandon Brown (R)	Brandonbilt Motorsports	Chevrolet	88.846
33	15	B. J. McLeod	JD Motorsports	Chevrolet	89.439
34	13	Chad Finchum	MBM Motorsports	Toyota	92.285
35	5	Vinnie Miller	B. J. McLeod Motorsports	Chevrolet	92.667
36	38	J. J. Yeley (i)	RSS Racing	Chevrolet	92.756
37	99	Patrick Gallagher	B. J. McLeod Motorsports	Toyota	0.000
38	53	Max Tullman	Jimmy Means Racing	Chevrolet	0.000

== Race ==
=== Summary ===
Austin Cindric started on pole and dominated Stage 1 despite Ray Black Jr. causing a caution on lap 4 for stalling and Jack Hawksworth spinning on the frontstretch. Cindric pitted with two laps remaining in the stage, giving the Stage 1 win to Chase Briscoe. On lap 28, Brandon Brown spun into a sand pit and got stuck. In the restart, Chris Dyson ran into Cole Custer, heavily damaging Dyson's car and forcing him to leave the race. For the next restart, Justin Allgaier and Noah Gragson spun simultaneously and collected numerous cars before Stephen Leicht lost a wheel and ended up ripping the door off David Starr's car. Hawksworth managed to win Stage 2 in his first NASCAR start.

Scott Heckert went off-course and crashed into the tire wall with 19 laps remaining. Briscoe, Regan Smith, and Will Rodgers stayed out while the leaders pitted. When the green flag waved, Briscoe quickly passed Smith but was soon caught by Cindric and Christopher Bell. Cindric soon pulled away, and ultimately took the win with a 3 second lead over Bell.

=== Stage Results ===
Stage One Laps: 20

Pos	No	Driver	Team	Manufacturer	Points
1	98	Chase Briscoe (R)	Stewart-Haas Racing with Biagi-DenBeste	Ford	10
2	9	Noah Gragson (R)	JR Motorsports	Chevrolet	9
3	51	Jeremy Clements	Jeremy Clements Racing	Chevrolet	8
4	19	Brandon Jones	Joe Gibbs Racing	Toyota	7
5	39	Ryan Sieg	RSS Racing	Chevrolet	6
6	00	Cole Custer	Stewart-Haas Racing with Biagi-DenBeste	Ford	5
7	1	Michael Annett	JR Motorsports	Chevrolet	4
8	4	Lawson Aschenbach	JD Motorsports	Chevrolet	3
9	78	Scott Heckert	B. J. McLeod Motorsports	Toyota	2
10	93	Josh Bilicki	RSS Racing	Chevrolet	1

Stage Two Laps: 20

Pos	No	Driver	Team	Manufacturer	Points
1	18	Jack Hawksworth	Joe Gibbs Racing	Toyota	10
2	20	Christopher Bell	Joe Gibbs Racing	Toyota	9
3	22	Austin Cindric	Team Penske	Ford	8
4	2	Tyler Reddick	Richard Childress Racing	Chevrolet	7
5	10	A. J. Allmendinger	Kaulig Racing	Chevrolet	6
6	08	Gray Gaulding	SS-Green Light Racing	Chevrolet	5
7	39	Ryan Sieg	RSS Racing	Chevrolet	4
8	11	Justin Haley (R)	Kaulig Racing	Chevrolet	3
9	23	John Hunter Nemechek (R)	GMS Racing	Chevrolet	2
10	66	Tommy Joe Martins	MBM Motorsports	Toyota	1

=== Final Stage Results ===
Stage Three Laps: 35

Pos	Grid	No	Driver	Team	Manufacturer	Laps	Points
1	1	22	Austin Cindric	Team Penske	Ford	75	48
2	3	20	Christopher Bell	Joe Gibbs Racing	Toyota	75	44
3	6	10	A. J. Allmendinger	Kaulig Racing	Chevrolet	75	40
4	10	2	Tyler Reddick	Richard Childress Racing	Chevrolet	75	40
5	7	9	Noah Gragson (R)	JR Motorsports	Chevrolet	75	41
6	8	7	Justin Allgaier	JR Motorsports	Chevrolet	75	31
7	5	98	Chase Briscoe (R)	Stewart-Haas Racing with Biagi-DenBeste	Ford	75	40
8	4	00	Cole Custer	Stewart-Haas Racing with Biagi-DenBeste	Ford	75	34
9	13	11	Justin Haley (R)	Kaulig Racing	Chevrolet	75	31
10	9	19	Brandon Jones	Joe Gibbs Racing	Toyota	75	34
11	11	51	Jeremy Clements	Jeremy Clements Racing	Chevrolet	75	34
12	22	86	Will Rodgers	Brandonbilt Motorsports	Chevrolet	75	25
13	21	1	Michael Annett	JR Motorsports	Chevrolet	75	28
14	16	08	Gray Gaulding	SS-Green Light Racing	Chevrolet	75	28
15	2	18	Jack Hawksworth	Joe Gibbs Racing	Toyota	75	32
16	14	39	Ryan Sieg	RSS Racing	Chevrolet	75	31
17	20	93	Josh Bilicki	RSS Racing	Chevrolet	75	21
18	18	66	Tommy Joe Martins	MBM Motorsports	Toyota	75	20
19	26	07	Ray Black Jr.	SS-Green Light Racing	Chevrolet	75	18
20	28	0	Garrett Smithley	JD Motorsports	Chevrolet	75	17
21	12	8	Regan Smith	JR Motorsports	Chevrolet	75	16
22	23	36	Josh Williams	DGM Racing	Chevrolet	75	15
23	37	99	Patrick Gallagher	B. J. McLeod Motorsports	Chevrolet	74	14
24	32	68	Brandon Brown (R)	Brandonbilt Motorsports	Chevrolet	74	13
25	35	5	Vinnie Miller	B. J. McLeod Motorsports	Chevrolet	74	12
26	33	15	B. J. McLeod	JD Motorsports	Chevrolet	73	11
27	25	42	Timmy Hill	MBM Motorsports	Toyota	65	10
28	19	4	Lawson Aschenbach	JD Motorsports	Chevrolet	63	12
29	17	78	Scott Heckert	B. J. McLeod Motorsports	Toyota	57	10
30	31	74	Aaron Quine	Mike Harmon Racing	Chevrolet	42	7
31	15	23	John Hunter Nemechek (R)	GMS Racing	Chevrolet	41	8
32	24	01	Stephen Leicht	JD Motorsports	Chevrolet	36	5
33	29	52	David Starr	Jimmy Means Racing	Chevrolet	36	4
34	27	90	Chris Dyson (i)	DGM Racing	Chevrolet	31	0
35	34	13	Chad Finchum	MBM Motorsports	Toyota	13	2
36	30	35	Joey Gase	MBM Motorsports	Toyota	8	1
37	36	38	J. J. Yeley (i)	RSS Racing	Chevrolet	2	0
38	38	53	Max Tullman	Jimmy Means Racing	Chevrolet	2	1

Previous race: 2019 Zippo 200 at The Glen	NASCAR Xfinity Series; 2019 season	Next race: 2019 Food City 300
