= Tullman-Walker Racing =

NASCAR team

- Owner(s): Steve Tullman; Jim Walker; Neal Walker
- Base: Philadelphia, Pennsylvania
- Series: NASCAR Xfinity Series; IMSA GT3 Cup Challenge Canada
- Race drivers: Xfinity Series; 26. Max Tullman; IMSA GT3 Series; 83. Neal Walker, Jim Walker, Max Tullman
- Manufacturer: Ford; Porsche

Career
- Debut: 2018 U.S. Cellular 250 (Iowa)
- Latest race: 2018 Ford EcoBoost 300 (Homestead)
- Races competed: 3
- Drivers' Championships: 0
- Race victories: 0
- Pole positions: 0

Tullman-Walker Racing is an American professional stock car racing team that last competed in the NASCAR Xfinity Series. The team was founded in 2015, specializing in the IMSA Porsche GT3 Cup Series. The team fielded the No. 26 Ford Mustang for Max Tullman, the son of owner Steve Tullman. The team also competed in the Ultra 94 Porsche GT3 Cup Challenge Canada by Yokohama, with Max Tullman, Jim Walker, and Neal Walker behind the wheel of their No. 83 Porsche.

== NASCAR Xfinity Series ==
=== Car No. 26 history ===
In 2018, the team made their NASCAR debut in the Xfinity Series with Max Tullman driving their No. 26 entry at Iowa. Sponsorship from the car came from Zoomi and Myota. The team also plans to have Tullman drive the car at Las Vegas and Kansas. Tullman piloted the car at Las Vegas and Homestead, and failed to qualify at Kansas.

== Porsche GT3 Cup Challenge Canada ==
=== Car No. 83 history ===
For the 2018 season, Max Tullman drove the team’s No. 83 Porsche 991 to a 26th place finish in the first race at Sebring International Raceway. Neal Walker drove the car in the next event at Canadian Tire Motorsports Park, finishing 9th. Jim Walker drove the car next at Circuit Gilles Villeneuve and finished 12th. Neal Walker drove the car next in Toronto Motorsports Park and finished 11th. James Walker Jr. drove the car at Trois-Rivieres Street Course and finished 8th. Max Tullman then drove the car in the final event and finished 13th.
