= Max Tullman =

American racing driver (born 1997)

- Born: Maxwell Brooks Tullman; August 22, 1997 (age 29); Chester Springs, Pennsylvania, U.S.

NASCAR O'Reilly Auto Parts Series career
- 6 races run over 2 years
- 2019 position: 62nd
- Best finish: 58th (2018)
- First race: 2018 U.S. Cellular 250 (Iowa)
- Last race: 2019 B&L Transport 170 (Mid-Ohio)
| Wins | Top tens | Poles |
|---|---|---|
| 0 | 0 | 0 |

NASCAR FedEx Freight Truck Series career
- 3 races run over 1 year
- 2018 position: 97th
- Best finish: 97th (2018)
- First race: 2018 Overton's 225 (Chicagoland)
- Last race: 2018 Fr8Auctions 250 (Talladega)
| Wins | Top tens | Poles |
|---|---|---|
| 0 | 1 | 0 |
- Statistics up to date as of November 18, 2019.

Maxwell Brooks Tullman (born August 22, 1997) is an American professional stock car racing driver. He last competed part-time in the NASCAR Xfinity Series, driving the No. 13 Toyota Supra for MBM Motorsports and the No. 53 Chevrolet Camaro for Jimmy Means Racing.

== Early life ==
Tullman’s racing career began at the age of 11 in Quarter Midgets. He has been racing in the IMSA Porsche GT3 Cup Series since 2015.

== Racing career ==
=== Xfinity Series ===
Tullman plans to run three races in the Xfinity Series, driving the No. 26 Ford Mustang for Tullman-Walker Racing. He ran his first Xfinity at Iowa, where he finished 30th due to a crash. In his other starts, he finished 23rd at Las Vegas, and failed to qualify at Kansas in the fall, and 25th at Homestead.

Tullman joined MBM Motorsports to drive the No. 13 Toyota for the season opener at Daytona.

=== Camping World Truck Series ===
In April, Tullman signed a partial NASCAR Camping World Truck Series schedule with Young's Motorsports.

Tullman made his NASCAR debut in the Truck Series in 2018, driving the No. 20 Chevrolet Silverado for Young’s Motorsports at Chicagoland. He finished 23rd after starting 21st.

Tullman also competed in the Truck Series event at Canadian Tire Motorsport Park.

Tullman earned a season-high ninth-place finish at Talladega (Ala.) Superspeedway in October in a third Young's Motorsports truck. He was the highest finishing driver for the organization ahead of mainstay driver Austin Hill and development driver Tanner Thorson.

=== K&N Pro Series West ===
Tullman ran three races in 2017 in the No. 27 Ford. His best finish was ninth at Bakersfield.

=== K&N Pro Series East ===
Tullman had run a total of two races, one each in 2017 and 2018. He ran both races in the No. 27 Ford and finished ninth at Millville in 2017 and fifteenth at Bristol in 2018.

=== ARCA Racing Series ===
In 2018, Tullman ran eight races in the No. 78 Chevrolet for Mason Mitchell Motorsports. His best performance was at Daytona, where he finished sixth after starting fourth.

Tullman also finished sixth at Talladega Superspeedway. He led laps in both restrictor plate races. Tyler Green, son of former NASCAR driver Mark Green and spotter for Jamie McMurray in the Monster Energy NASCAR Cup Series, served as the spotter.

== Personal life ==
Tullman is the son of Steve Tullman who currently owns Tullman-Walker Racing.

== Motorsports career results ==
=== NASCAR ===
(key) (Bold – Pole position awarded by time. Italics – Pole position earned by points standings. * – Most laps led.)

==== Xfinity Series ====
NASCAR Xfinity Series results
| Year | Team | No. | Make | 1 | 2 | 3 | 4 | 5 | 6 | 7 | 8 | 9 | 10 | 11 | 12 | 13 | 14 | 15 | 16 | 17 | 18 | 19 | 20 | 21 | 22 | 23 | 24 | 25 | 26 | 27 | 28 | 29 | 30 | 31 | 32 | 33 | NXSC | Pts | Ref |
|---|---|---|---|---|---|---|---|---|---|---|---|---|---|---|---|---|---|---|---|---|---|---|---|---|---|---|---|---|---|---|---|---|---|---|---|---|---|---|---|
| 2018 | Tullman-Walker Racing | 26 | Ford | DAY | ATL | LVS | PHO | CAL | TEX | BRI | RCH | TAL | DOV | CLT | POC | MCH | IOW | CHI | DAY | KEN | NHA | IOW; 30 | GLN | MOH | BRI | ROA | DAR | IND | LVS; 23 | RCH | CLT | DOV | KAN; DNQ | TEX | PHO | HOM; 25 | 58th | 26^{2} | |
| 2019 | MBM Motorsports | 13 | Toyota | DAY; 28 | ATL | LVS | PHO | CAL | TEX | BRI | RCH | | | | | | | | | | | | | | | | | | | | | | | | | | 62nd | 27 | |
| 2019 | MBM Motorsports | 42 | Toyota | | | | | | | | | TAL; 20 | DOV | CLT | POC | MCH | IOW | CHI | DAY | KEN | NHA | IOW | GLN | | | | | | | | | | | | | | 62nd | 27 | |
| 2019 | Jimmy Means Racing | 53 | Chevy | | | | | | | | | | | | | | | | | | | | | MOH; 38 | BRI | ROA | DAR | IND | LVS | RCH | CLT | DOV | KAN | TEX | PHO | HOM | 62nd | 27 | |

==== Camping World Truck Series ====
NASCAR Camping World Truck Series results
| Year | Team | No. | Make | 1 | 2 | 3 | 4 | 5 | 6 | 7 | 8 | 9 | 10 | 11 | 12 | 13 | 14 | 15 | 16 | 17 | 18 | 19 | 20 | 21 | 22 | 23 | NCWTC | Pts | Ref |
|---|---|---|---|---|---|---|---|---|---|---|---|---|---|---|---|---|---|---|---|---|---|---|---|---|---|---|---|---|---|
| 2018 | Young's Motorsports | 20 | Chevy | DAY | ATL | LVS | MAR | DOV | KAN | CLT | TEX | IOW | GTW | CHI; 23 | KEN | ELD | POC | MCH | BRI | MSP; 30 | LVS | TAL; 9 | MAR | TEX | PHO | HOM | 97th | 0^{1} | |

==== K&N Pro Series East ====
NASCAR K&N Pro Series East results
| Year | Team | No. | Make | 1 | 2 | 3 | 4 | 5 | 6 | 7 | 8 | 9 | 10 | 11 | 12 | 13 | 14 | NKNPSEC | Pts | Ref |
|---|---|---|---|---|---|---|---|---|---|---|---|---|---|---|---|---|---|---|---|---|
| 2017 | Jefferson Pitts Racing | 27 | Ford | NSM | GRE | BRI | SBO | SBO | MEM | BLN | TMP | NHA | IOW | GLN | LGY | NJM; 9 | DOV | 49th | 35 | |
| 2018 | Jefferson Pitts Racing | 27 | Ford | NSM | BRI; 15 | LGY | SBO | SBO | MEM | NJM | TMP | NHA | IOW | GLN | GTW | NHA | DOV | 52nd | 29 | |

==== K&N Pro Series West ====
NASCAR K&N Pro Series West results
| Year | Team | No. | Make | 1 | 2 | 3 | 4 | 5 | 6 | 7 | 8 | 9 | 10 | 11 | 12 | 13 | 14 | NKNPSWC | Pts | Ref |
|---|---|---|---|---|---|---|---|---|---|---|---|---|---|---|---|---|---|---|---|---|
| 2017 | Jefferson Pitts Racing | 27 | Ford | TUS | KCR | IRW | IRW | SPO | OSS | CNS | SON | IOW | EVG | DCS | MER; 17 | AAS; 10 | KCR; 9 | 24th | 96 | |

^{*} Season still in progress
^{1} Ineligible for series points
^{2} Tullman began the 2018 season racing for Truck Series points but switched to Xfinity Series points before the race at Las Vegas II.

=== ARCA Racing Series ===
ARCA Racing Series results
| Year | Team | No. | Make | 1 | 2 | 3 | 4 | 5 | 6 | 7 | 8 | 9 | 10 | 11 | 12 | 13 | 14 | 15 | 16 | 17 | 18 | 19 | 20 | ARSC | Pts | Ref |
|---|---|---|---|---|---|---|---|---|---|---|---|---|---|---|---|---|---|---|---|---|---|---|---|---|---|---|
| 2018 | Mason Mitchell Motorsports | 78 | Chevy | DAY; 6 | NSH | SLM | TAL; 6 | TOL | CLT; 12 | POC; 15 | MCH; 7 | MAD | GTW; 19 | CHI; 17 | IOW; 12 | ELK | POC | ISF | BLN | DSF | SLM | IRP | KAN | 17th | 1830 | |
