= 2018 Bar Harbor 200 =

29th race of the 2018 NASCAR Xfinity Series

Race details
- Race 29 of 33 of the 2018 NASCAR Xfinity Series
- Date: October 6, 2018
- Official name: 19th Annual Bar Harbor 200
- Location: Dover, Delaware, Dover International Speedway
- Course: Permanent racing facility
- Course length: 1 miles (1.6 km)
- Distance: 200 laps, 200 mi (321.868 km)
- Scheduled distance: 200 laps, 200 mi (321.868 km)
- Average speed: 116.845 miles per hour (188.044 km/h)

Pole position
Driver	Daniel Hemric	Richard Childress Racing
- Time: 22.749

Most laps led
Driver	Christopher Bell	Joe Gibbs Racing
- Laps: 110

Winner
No. 20	Christopher Bell	Joe Gibbs Racing

Television in the United States
- Network: NBCSN
- Announcers: Rick Allen, Jeff Burton, Steve Letarte, Dale Earnhardt Jr.

Radio in the United States
- Radio: Motor Racing Network

The 2018 Bar Harbor 200 was the 29th stock car race of the 2018 NASCAR Xfinity Series season, the third and final race in the Round of 12, and the 19th iteration of the event. The race was held on Saturday, October 6, in Dover, Delaware at Dover International Speedway, a 1 mile (1.6 km) permanent oval-shaped racetrack. The race took the scheduled 200 laps to complete. At race's end, Christopher Bell of Joe Gibbs Racing would dominate the race to win his seventh career NASCAR Xfinity Series win and his sixth of the season. To fill out the podium, Cole Custer of Stewart-Haas Racing with Biagi-DenBeste and Justin Allgaier of JR Motorsports would finish second and third, respectively.

== Background ==
The layout of Dover International Speedway, the venue where the race was held.

Dover International Speedway is an oval race track in Dover, Delaware, United States that has held at least two NASCAR races since it opened in 1969. In addition to NASCAR, the track also hosted USAC and the NTT IndyCar Series. The track features one layout, a 1-mile (1.6 km) concrete oval, with 24° banking in the turns and 9° banking on the straights. The speedway is owned and operated by Dover Motorsports.

The track, nicknamed "The Monster Mile", was built in 1969 by Melvin Joseph of Melvin L. Joseph Construction Company, Inc., with an asphalt surface, but was replaced with concrete in 1995. Six years later in 2001, the track's capacity moved to 135,000 seats, making the track have the largest capacity of sports venue in the mid-Atlantic. In 2002, the name changed to Dover International Speedway from Dover Downs International Speedway after Dover Downs Gaming and Entertainment split, making Dover Motorsports. From 2007 to 2009, the speedway worked on an improvement project called "The Monster Makeover", which expanded facilities at the track and beautified the track. After the 2014 season, the track's capacity was reduced to 95,500 seats.

=== Entry list ===
#	Driver	Team	Make	Sponsor
0	Garrett Smithley	JD Motorsports	Chevrolet	Heroes Haven
00	Cole Custer	Stewart-Haas Racing with Biagi-DenBeste	Ford	Haas Automation
1	Elliott Sadler	JR Motorsports	Chevrolet	OneMain Financial "Lending Done Human"
01	Landon Cassill	JD Motorsports	Chevrolet	Iron Source, Meding's Seafood
2	Matt Tifft	Richard Childress Racing	Chevrolet	Surface Sunscreen, Fanatics
3	Shane Lee	Richard Childress Racing	Chevrolet	Childress Vineyards
4	Ross Chastain	JD Motorsports	Chevrolet	Delaware Office of Highway Safety "Use Your Melon"
5	Michael Annett	JR Motorsports	Chevrolet	Pilot Flying J
7	Justin Allgaier	JR Motorsports	Chevrolet	Brandt Professional Agriculture
8	Matt Mills	B. J. McLeod Motorsports	Chevrolet	J. F. Electric
9	Tyler Reddick	JR Motorsports	Chevrolet	BurgerFi
11	Ryan Truex	Kaulig Racing	Chevrolet	LeafFilter Gutter Protection
13	Carl Long	MBM Motorsports	Toyota	MBM Motorsports
15	B. J. McLeod	JD Motorsports	Chevrolet	Valley Forge Military Academy and College
16	Ryan Reed	Roush Fenway Racing	Ford	DriveDownA1C.com
18	Ryan Preece	Joe Gibbs Racing	Toyota	Craftsman
19	Brandon Jones	Joe Gibbs Racing	Toyota	Menards, Atlas Designer Shingles
20	Christopher Bell	Joe Gibbs Racing	Toyota	Rheem
21	Daniel Hemric	Richard Childress Racing	Chevrolet	South Point Hotel, Casino & Spa
22	Austin Cindric	Team Penske	Ford	Discount Tire
23	Spencer Gallagher	GMS Racing	Chevrolet	Allegiant Air
35	Joey Gase	Go Green Racing with SS-Green Light Racing	Chevrolet	Sparks Energy
36	Alex Labbé	DGM Racing	Chevrolet	VR Victoriaville, Sticky Stuff
38	J. J. Yeley	RSS Racing	Chevrolet	RSS Racing
39	Ryan Sieg	RSS Racing	Chevrolet	RSS Racing
40	Chad Finchum	MBM Motorsports	Toyota	Smithbilt Homes
42	John Hunter Nemechek	Chip Ganassi Racing	Chevrolet	Chevrolet Accessories
45	Josh Bilicki	JP Motorsports	Toyota	Prevagen
51	Jeremy Clements	Jeremy Clements Racing	Chevrolet	RepairableVehicles.com
52	David Starr	Jimmy Means Racing	Chevrolet	Alarm Tech Services
55	Bayley Currey	JP Motorsports	Toyota	Touched by Pros, Rollin Smoke Barbecue
60	Chase Briscoe	Roush Fenway Racing	Ford	Ford
66	Timmy Hill	MBM Motorsports	Dodge	CrashClaimsR.Us
74	Mike Harmon	Mike Harmon Racing	Dodge	Veterans For Child Rescue
76	Spencer Boyd	SS-Green Light Racing	Chevrolet	Grunt Style "This We'll Defend"
78	Vinnie Miller	B. J. McLeod Motorsports	Chevrolet	CorvetteParts.net
89	Morgan Shepherd	Shepherd Racing Ventures	Chevrolet	Visone RV Motorhome Parts, Racing with Jesus
90	Brandon Brown	Brandonbilt Motorsports	Chevrolet	Coalition to Salute America's Heroes
93	Jeff Green	RSS Racing	Chevrolet	RSS Racing
99	Stephen Leicht	B. J. McLeod Motorsports	Chevrolet	B. J. McLeod Motorsports
Official entry list

== Practice ==
=== First practice ===
The first practice session was held on Friday, October 5, at 12:05 pm EST, and would last for 50 minutes. Justin Allgaier of JR Motorsports would set the fastest time in the session, with a lap of 23.269 and an average speed of 154.712 miles per hour (248.985 km/h).

Pos.	#	Driver	Team	Make	Time	Speed
1	7	Justin Allgaier	JR Motorsports	Chevrolet	23.269	154.712
2	9	Tyler Reddick	JR Motorsports	Chevrolet	23.347	154.195
3	00	Cole Custer	Stewart-Haas Racing with Biagi-DenBeste	Ford	23.415	153.748
Full first practice results

=== Second practice ===
The second and final practice session, sometimes referred to as Happy Hour, was held on Friday, October 5, at 2:30 pm EST, and would last for 50 minutes. Justin Allgaier of JR Motorsports would set the fastest time in the session, with a lap of 23.461 and an average speed of 153.446 miles per hour (246.947 km/h).

Pos.	#	Driver	Team	Make	Time	Speed
1	7	Justin Allgaier	JR Motorsports	Chevrolet	23.461	153.446
2	00	Cole Custer	Stewart-Haas Racing with Biagi-DenBeste	Ford	23.462	153.440
3	42	John Hunter Nemechek	Chip Ganassi Racing	Chevrolet	23.484	153.296
Full Happy Hour practice results

== Qualifying ==
Qualifying was held on Saturday, October 6, at 12:05 pm EST. Since Dover International Speedway is under 2 miles (3.2 km), the qualifying system was a multi-car system that included three rounds. The first round was 15 minutes, where every driver would be able to set a lap within the 15 minutes. Then, the second round would consist of the fastest 24 cars in Round 1, and drivers would have 10 minutes to set a lap. Round 3 consisted of the fastest 12 drivers from Round 2, and the drivers would have 5 minutes to set a time. Whoever was fastest in Round 3 would win the pole.

Rain would cancel both Rounds 2 and 3, leaving only the first round ran.

Daniel Hemric of Richard Childress Racing would win the pole, setting a lap of 22.749 and an average speed of 133.610 miles per hour (215.024 km/h).

No drivers would fail to qualify.

=== Full qualifying results ===
Pos.	#	Driver	Team	Make	Time	Speed
1	21	Daniel Hemric	Richard Childress Racing	Chevrolet	22.749	158.249
2	20	Christopher Bell	Joe Gibbs Racing	Toyota	22.841	157.611
3	7	Justin Allgaier	JR Motorsports	Chevrolet	22.873	157.391
4	23	Spencer Gallagher	GMS Racing	Chevrolet	22.943	156.911
5	19	Brandon Jones	Joe Gibbs Racing	Toyota	22.976	156.685
6	1	Elliott Sadler	JR Motorsports	Chevrolet	22.985	156.624
7	00	Cole Custer	Stewart-Haas Racing with Biagi-DenBeste	Ford	23.024	156.359
8	22	Austin Cindric	Team Penske	Ford	23.048	156.196
9	3	Shane Lee	Richard Childress Racing	Chevrolet	23.060	156.114
10	2	Matt Tifft	Richard Childress Racing	Chevrolet	23.075	156.013
11	18	Ryan Preece	Joe Gibbs Racing	Toyota	23.083	155.959
12	42	John Hunter Nemechek	Chip Ganassi Racing	Chevrolet	23.147	155.528
13	60	Chase Briscoe	Roush Fenway Racing	Ford	23.173	155.353
14	9	Tyler Reddick	JR Motorsports	Chevrolet	23.195	155.206
15	4	Ross Chastain	JD Motorsports	Chevrolet	23.250	154.839
16	51	Jeremy Clements	Jeremy Clements Racing	Chevrolet	23.261	154.765
17	39	Ryan Sieg	RSS Racing	Chevrolet	23.309	154.447
18	5	Michael Annett	JR Motorsports	Chevrolet	23.336	154.268
19	11	Ryan Truex	Kaulig Racing	Chevrolet	23.353	154.156
20	16	Ryan Reed	Roush Fenway Racing	Ford	23.377	153.998
21	36	Alex Labbé	DGM Racing	Chevrolet	23.450	153.518
22	01	Landon Cassill	JD Motorsports	Chevrolet	23.466	153.413
23	38	J. J. Yeley	RSS Racing	Chevrolet	23.552	152.853
24	90	Brandon Brown	Brandonbilt Motorsports	Chevrolet	23.668	152.104
25	35	Joey Gase	Go Green Racing with SS-Green Light Racing	Chevrolet	23.858	150.893
26	40	Chad Finchum	MBM Motorsports	Toyota	23.914	150.539
27	15	B. J. McLeod	JD Motorsports	Chevrolet	23.964	150.225
28	0	Garrett Smithley	JD Motorsports	Chevrolet	23.973	150.169
29	66	Timmy Hill	MBM Motorsports	Dodge	24.051	149.682
30	8	Matt Mills	B. J. McLeod Motorsports	Chevrolet	24.164	148.982
31	76	Spencer Boyd	SS-Green Light Racing	Chevrolet	24.234	148.552
32	93	Jeff Green	RSS Racing	Chevrolet	24.358	147.795
33	99	Stephen Leicht	B. J. McLeod Motorsports	Chevrolet	24.360	147.783
Qualified by owner's points
34	52	David Starr	Jimmy Means Racing	Chevrolet	24.361	147.777
35	55	Bayley Currey	JP Motorsports	Toyota	24.607	146.300
36	89	Morgan Shepherd	Shepherd Racing Ventures	Chevrolet	24.617	146.240
37	13	Carl Long	MBM Motorsports	Toyota	24.672	145.914
38	45	Josh Bilicki	JP Motorsports	Toyota	24.898	144.590
39	78	Vinnie Miller	B. J. McLeod Motorsports	Chevrolet	24.970	144.173
40	74	Mike Harmon	Mike Harmon Racing	Dodge	—	—
Official qualifying results
Official starting lineup

== Race results ==
Stage 1 Laps: 45

Pos.	#	Driver	Team	Make	Pts
1	20	Christopher Bell	Joe Gibbs Racing	Toyota	10
2	21	Daniel Hemric	Richard Childress Racing	Chevrolet	9
3	7	Justin Allgaier	JR Motorsports	Chevrolet	8
4	19	Brandon Jones	Joe Gibbs Racing	Toyota	7
5	23	Spencer Gallagher	GMS Racing	Chevrolet	6
6	1	Elliott Sadler	JR Motorsports	Chevrolet	5
7	00	Cole Custer	Stewart-Haas Racing with Biagi-DenBeste	Ford	4
8	22	Austin Cindric	Team Penske	Ford	3
9	2	Matt Tifft	Richard Childress Racing	Chevrolet	2
10	18	Ryan Preece	Joe Gibbs Racing	Toyota	1

Stage 2 Laps: 45

Pos.	#	Driver	Team	Make	Pts
1	21	Daniel Hemric	Richard Childress Racing	Chevrolet	10
2	20	Christopher Bell	Joe Gibbs Racing	Toyota	9
3	7	Justin Allgaier	JR Motorsports	Chevrolet	8
4	23	Spencer Gallagher	GMS Racing	Chevrolet	7
5	00	Cole Custer	Stewart-Haas Racing with Biagi-DenBeste	Ford	6
6	22	Austin Cindric	Team Penske	Ford	5
7	1	Elliott Sadler	JR Motorsports	Chevrolet	4
8	18	Ryan Preece	Joe Gibbs Racing	Toyota	3
9	42	John Hunter Nemechek	Chip Ganassi Racing	Chevrolet	2
10	4	Ross Chastain	JD Motorsports	Chevrolet	1

Stage 3 Laps: 110

Fin	St	#	Driver	Team	Make	Laps	Led	Status	Pts
1	2	20	Christopher Bell	Joe Gibbs Racing	Toyota	200	110	running	59
2	7	00	Cole Custer	Stewart-Haas Racing with Biagi-DenBeste	Ford	200	38	running	45
3	3	7	Justin Allgaier	JR Motorsports	Chevrolet	200	23	running	50
4	11	18	Ryan Preece	Joe Gibbs Racing	Toyota	200	0	running	37
5	4	23	Spencer Gallagher	GMS Racing	Chevrolet	200	2	running	45
6	5	19	Brandon Jones	Joe Gibbs Racing	Toyota	200	4	running	38
7	1	21	Daniel Hemric	Richard Childress Racing	Chevrolet	200	23	running	49
8	8	22	Austin Cindric	Team Penske	Ford	200	0	running	37
9	12	42	John Hunter Nemechek	Chip Ganassi Racing	Chevrolet	200	0	running	30
10	19	11	Ryan Truex	Kaulig Racing	Chevrolet	200	0	running	27
11	6	1	Elliott Sadler	JR Motorsports	Chevrolet	200	0	running	35
12	18	5	Michael Annett	JR Motorsports	Chevrolet	200	0	running	25
13	15	4	Ross Chastain	JD Motorsports	Chevrolet	200	0	running	25
14	14	9	Tyler Reddick	JR Motorsports	Chevrolet	200	0	running	23
15	10	2	Matt Tifft	Richard Childress Racing	Chevrolet	200	0	running	24
16	20	16	Ryan Reed	Roush Fenway Racing	Ford	200	0	running	21
17	9	3	Shane Lee	Richard Childress Racing	Chevrolet	200	0	running	20
18	17	39	Ryan Sieg	RSS Racing	Chevrolet	199	0	running	19
19	13	60	Chase Briscoe	Roush Fenway Racing	Ford	199	0	running	18
20	16	51	Jeremy Clements	Jeremy Clements Racing	Chevrolet	197	0	running	17
21	21	36	Alex Labbé	DGM Racing	Chevrolet	197	0	running	16
22	24	90	Brandon Brown	Brandonbilt Motorsports	Chevrolet	197	0	running	15
23	28	0	Garrett Smithley	JD Motorsports	Chevrolet	196	0	running	14
24	34	52	David Starr	Jimmy Means Racing	Chevrolet	195	0	running	13
25	39	78	Vinnie Miller	B. J. McLeod Motorsports	Chevrolet	192	0	running	12
26	22	01	Landon Cassill	JD Motorsports	Chevrolet	189	0	drivetrain	11
27	29	66	Timmy Hill	MBM Motorsports	Dodge	189	0	running	10
28	30	8	Matt Mills	B. J. McLeod Motorsports	Chevrolet	188	0	running	9
29	35	55	Bayley Currey	JP Motorsports	Toyota	187	0	running	0
30	25	35	Joey Gase	Go Green Racing with SS-Green Light Racing	Chevrolet	170	0	engine	7
31	38	45	Josh Bilicki	JP Motorsports	Toyota	159	0	crash	6
32	31	76	Spencer Boyd	SS-Green Light Racing	Chevrolet	110	0	suspension	5
33	23	38	J. J. Yeley	RSS Racing	Chevrolet	101	0	overheating	4
34	26	40	Chad Finchum	MBM Motorsports	Toyota	62	0	suspension	3
35	40	74	Mike Harmon	Mike Harmon Racing	Dodge	60	0	too slow	2
36	37	13	Carl Long	MBM Motorsports	Toyota	59	0	suspension	1
37	27	15	B. J. McLeod	JD Motorsports	Chevrolet	30	0	engine	1
38	36	89	Morgan Shepherd	Shepherd Racing Ventures	Chevrolet	21	0	electrical	1
39	32	93	Jeff Green	RSS Racing	Chevrolet	16	0	suspension	1
40	33	99	Stephen Leicht	B. J. McLeod Motorsports	Chevrolet	13	0	electrical	1
Official race results

Previous race: 2018 Drive for the Cure 200	NASCAR Xfinity Series; 2018 season	Next race: 2018 Kansas Lottery 300
