= 2017 OneMain Financial 200 =

Eleventh race of the 2017 NASCAR Xfinity Series

Race details
- Race 11 of 33 in the 2017 NASCAR Xfinity Series
- Date: June 3, 2017
- Official name: 36th Annual OneMain Financial 200
- Location: Dover, Delaware, Dover International Speedway
- Course: Permanent racing facility
- Course length: 1 miles (1.6 km)
- Distance: 200 laps, 200 mi (321.868 km)
- Scheduled distance: 200 laps, 200 mi (321.868 km)
- Average speed: 96.709 miles per hour (155.638 km/h)

Pole position
Driver	Kyle Larson	Chip Ganassi Racing
- Time: 22.864

Most laps led
Driver	Kyle Larson	Chip Ganassi Racing
- Laps: 137

Winner
No. 42	Kyle Larson	Chip Ganassi Racing

Television in the United States
- Network: Fox Sports 1
- Announcers: Adam Alexander, Michael Waltrip, Joey Logano

Radio in the United States
- Radio: Motor Racing Network

The 2017 OneMain Financial 200 was the 11th stock car race of the 2017 NASCAR Xfinity Series season and the 36th iteration of the event. The race was held on Saturday, June 3, 2017, in Dover, Delaware at Dover International Speedway, a 1 mile (1.6 km) permanent oval-shaped racetrack. The race took the scheduled 200 laps to complete. At race's end, Kyle Larson, driving for Chip Ganassi Racing, would dominate most of the race to win his eighth career NASCAR Xfinity Series win and his third and final win of the season. To fill out the podium, Ryan Blaney of Team Penske and Daniel Suárez of Joe Gibbs Racing would finish second and third, respectively.

== Entry list ==
- (R) denotes rookie driver.
- (i) denotes driver who is ineligible for series driver points.

#	Driver	Team	Make
00	Cole Custer (R)	Stewart–Haas Racing	Ford
0	Garrett Smithley	JD Motorsports	Chevrolet
1	Elliott Sadler	JR Motorsports	Chevrolet
01	Harrison Rhodes	JD Motorsports	Chevrolet
2	Austin Dillon (i)	Richard Childress Racing	Chevrolet
3	Ty Dillon (i)	Richard Childress Racing	Chevrolet
4	Ross Chastain	JD Motorsports	Chevrolet
5	Michael Annett	JR Motorsports	Chevrolet
6	Bubba Wallace	Roush Fenway Racing	Ford
7	Justin Allgaier	JR Motorsports	Chevrolet
07	Ray Black Jr.	SS-Green Light Racing	Chevrolet
8	B. J. McLeod	B. J. McLeod Motorsports	Chevrolet
9	William Byron (R)	JR Motorsports	Chevrolet
11	Blake Koch	Kaulig Racing	Chevrolet
13	Timmy Hill	MBM Motorsports	Toyota
14	J. J. Yeley	TriStar Motorsports	Toyota
16	Ryan Reed	Roush Fenway Racing	Ford
18	Daniel Suárez (i)	Joe Gibbs Racing	Toyota
19	Matt Tifft (R)	Joe Gibbs Racing	Toyota
20	Erik Jones (i)	Joe Gibbs Racing	Toyota
21	Daniel Hemric (R)	Richard Childress Racing	Chevrolet
22	Ryan Blaney (i)	Team Penske	Ford
23	Spencer Gallagher (R)	GMS Racing	Chevrolet
24	Dylan Lupton	JGL Racing	Toyota
28	Dakoda Armstrong	JGL Racing	Toyota
33	Brandon Jones	Richard Childress Racing	Chevrolet
39	Ryan Sieg	RSS Racing	Chevrolet
40	Chad Finchum	MBM Motorsports	Chevrolet
42	Kyle Larson (i)	Chip Ganassi Racing	Chevrolet
48	Brennan Poole	Chip Ganassi Racing	Chevrolet
51	Jeremy Clements	Jeremy Clements Racing	Chevrolet
52	Joey Gase	Jimmy Means Racing	Chevrolet
62	Brendan Gaughan	Richard Childress Racing	Chevrolet
74	Mike Harmon	Mike Harmon Racing	Dodge
78	Jordan Anderson (i)	B. J. McLeod Motorsports	Chevrolet
89	Morgan Shepherd	Shepherd Racing Ventures	Chevrolet
90	Brandon Brown	Brandonbilt Motorsports	Chevrolet
93	Jeff Green	RSS Racing	Chevrolet
96	Ben Kennedy (R)	GMS Racing	Chevrolet
99	David Starr	B. J. McLeod Motorsports with SS-Green Light Racing	Chevrolet
Official entry list

== Practice ==
=== First practice ===
The first practice session was held on Friday, June 2, at 9:30 AM EST, and would last for 55 minutes. Kyle Larson of Chip Ganassi Racing would set the fastest time in the session, with a lap of 23.295 and an average speed of 154.540 miles per hour (248.708 km/h).

Pos	#	Driver	Team	Make	Time	Speed
1	42	Kyle Larson (i)	Chip Ganassi Racing	Chevrolet	23.295	154.540
2	19	Matt Tifft (R)	Joe Gibbs Racing	Toyota	23.322	154.361
3	22	Ryan Blaney (i)	Team Penske	Ford	23.372	154.030
Full first practice results

=== Final practice ===
The final practice session, was held on Friday, June 2, at 1:30 PM EST, and would last for 55 minutes. Ryan Blaney of Team Penske would set the fastest time in the session, with a lap of 23.604 and an average speed of 152.517 miles per hour (245.452 km/h).

Pos	#	Driver	Team	Make	Time	Speed
1	22	Ryan Blaney (i)	Team Penske	Ford	23.604	152.517
2	42	Kyle Larson (i)	Chip Ganassi Racing	Chevrolet	23.679	152.033
3	00	Cole Custer (R)	Stewart–Haas Racing	Ford	23.698	151.912
Full Happy Hour practice results

== Qualifying ==
Qualifying was held on Saturday, June 3, at 10:05 AM EST. Since Dover International Speedway is under 2 miles (3.2 km) in length, the qualifying system was a multi-car system that included three rounds. The first round was 15 minutes, where every driver would be able to set a lap within the 15 minutes. Then, the second round would consist of the fastest 24 cars in Round 1, and drivers would have 10 minutes to set a lap. Round 3 consisted of the fastest 12 drivers from Round 2, and the drivers would have 5 minutes to set a time. Whoever was fastest in Round 3 would win the pole.

Kyle Larson of Chip Ganassi Racing would win the pole after advancing from both preliminary rounds and setting the fastest lap in Round 3, with a time of 22.864 and an average speed of 157.453 miles per hour (253.396 km/h).

No drivers would fail to qualify.

=== Full qualifying results ===
Pos	#	Driver	Team	Make	Time (R1)	Speed (R1)	Time (R2)	Speed (R2)	Time (R3)	Speed (R3)
1	42	Kyle Larson (i)	Chip Ganassi Racing	Chevrolet	23.098	155.858	22.741	158.304	22.864	157.453
2	22	Ryan Blaney (i)	Team Penske	Ford	23.331	154.301	22.905	157.171	22.934	156.972
3	18	Daniel Suárez (i)	Joe Gibbs Racing	Toyota	23.094	155.885	22.870	157.411	22.942	156.917
4	20	Erik Jones (i)	Joe Gibbs Racing	Toyota	23.215	155.072	23.029	156.325	22.975	156.692
5	48	Brennan Poole	Chip Ganassi Racing	Chevrolet	23.300	154.506	23.040	156.250	23.037	156.270
6	19	Matt Tifft (R)	Joe Gibbs Racing	Toyota	23.208	155.119	23.019	156.393	23.064	156.087
7	2	Austin Dillon (i)	Richard Childress Racing	Chevrolet	23.226	154.999	23.040	156.250	23.076	156.006
8	9	William Byron (R)	JR Motorsports	Chevrolet	23.353	154.156	22.992	156.576	23.130	155.642
9	1	Elliott Sadler	JR Motorsports	Chevrolet	22.983	156.638	23.149	155.514	23.148	155.521
10	21	Daniel Hemric (R)	Richard Childress Racing	Chevrolet	23.349	154.182	23.171	155.367	23.208	155.119
11	3	Ty Dillon (i)	Richard Childress Racing	Chevrolet	23.545	152.899	23.143	155.555	23.211	155.099
12	7	Justin Allgaier	JR Motorsports	Chevrolet	23.418	153.728	23.171	155.367	23.257	154.792
Eliminated in Round 2
13	33	Brandon Jones	Richard Childress Racing	Chevrolet	23.469	153.394	23.196	155.199	-	-
14	00	Cole Custer (R)	Stewart–Haas Racing	Ford	23.153	155.487	23.210	155.106	-	-
15	62	Brendan Gaughan	Richard Childress Racing	Chevrolet	23.611	152.471	23.273	154.686	-	-
16	11	Blake Koch	Kaulig Racing	Chevrolet	23.607	152.497	23.320	154.374	-	-
17	16	Ryan Reed	Roush Fenway Racing	Ford	23.267	154.726	23.326	154.334	-	-
18	6	Bubba Wallace	Roush Fenway Racing	Ford	23.416	153.741	23.361	154.103	-	-
19	39	Ryan Sieg	RSS Racing	Chevrolet	23.510	153.126	23.366	154.070	-	-
20	4	Ross Chastain	JD Motorsports	Chevrolet	23.482	153.309	23.551	152.860	-	-
21	24	Dylan Lupton	JGL Racing	Toyota	23.406	153.807	23.713	151.815	-	-
22	28	Dakoda Armstrong	JGL Racing	Toyota	23.703	151.880	23.731	151.700	-	-
23	5	Michael Annett	JR Motorsports	Chevrolet	23.657	152.175	23.914	150.539	-	-
24	23	Spencer Gallagher (R)	GMS Racing	Chevrolet	23.657	152.175	-	-	-	-
Eliminated in Round 1
25	96	Ben Kennedy (R)	GMS Racing	Chevrolet	23.736	151.668	-	-	-	-
26	14	J. J. Yeley	TriStar Motorsports	Toyota	23.748	151.592	-	-	-	-
27	78	Jordan Anderson (i)	B. J. McLeod Motorsports	Chevrolet	23.796	151.286	-	-	-	-
28	8	B. J. McLeod	B. J. McLeod Motorsports	Chevrolet	23.798	151.273	-	-	-	-
29	51	Jeremy Clements	Jeremy Clements Racing	Chevrolet	23.814	151.172	-	-	-	-
30	01	Harrison Rhodes	JD Motorsports	Chevrolet	23.825	151.102	-	-	-	-
31	40	Chad Finchum	MBM Motorsports	Chevrolet	23.877	150.773	-	-	-	-
32	90	Brandon Brown	Brandonbilt Motorsports	Chevrolet	23.951	150.307	-	-	-	-
33	0	Garrett Smithley	JD Motorsports	Chevrolet	24.024	149.850	-	-	-	-
Qualified by owner's points
34	07	Ray Black Jr.	SS-Green Light Racing	Chevrolet	24.054	149.663	-	-	-	-
35	89	Morgan Shepherd	Shepherd Racing Ventures	Chevrolet	24.077	149.520	-	-	-	-
36	99	David Starr	BJMM with SS-Green Light Racing	Chevrolet	24.236	148.539	-	-	-	-
37	13	Timmy Hill	MBM Motorsports	Toyota	24.493	146.981	-	-	-	-
38	93	Jeff Green	RSS Racing	Chevrolet	24.515	146.849	-	-	-	-
39	52	Joey Gase	Jimmy Means Racing	Chevrolet	24.960	144.231	-	-	-	-
40	74	Mike Harmon	Mike Harmon Racing	Dodge	25.656	140.318	-	-	-	-
Official qualifying results
Official starting lineup

== Race results ==
Stage 1 Laps: 45

Pos	#	Driver	Team	Make	Pts
1	42	Kyle Larson (i)	Chip Ganassi Racing	Chevrolet	0
2	22	Ryan Blaney (i)	Team Penske	Ford	0
3	20	Erik Jones (i)	Joe Gibbs Racing	Toyota	0
4	16	Ryan Reed	Roush Fenway Racing	Ford	7
5	48	Brennan Poole	Chip Ganassi Racing	Chevrolet	6
6	9	William Byron (R)	JR Motorsports	Chevrolet	5
7	7	Justin Allgaier	JR Motorsports	Chevrolet	4
8	1	Elliott Sadler	JR Motorsports	Chevrolet	3
9	21	Daniel Hemric (R)	Richard Childress Racing	Chevrolet	2
10	00	Cole Custer (R)	Stewart–Haas Racing	Ford	1

Stage 2 Laps: 45

Pos	#	Driver	Team	Make	Pts
1	1	Elliott Sadler	JR Motorsports	Chevrolet	10
2	22	Ryan Blaney (i)	Team Penske	Ford	0
3	9	William Byron (R)	JR Motorsports	Chevrolet	8
4	7	Justin Allgaier	JR Motorsports	Chevrolet	7
5	42	Kyle Larson (i)	Chip Ganassi Racing	Chevrolet	0
6	16	Ryan Reed	Roush Fenway Racing	Ford	5
7	21	Daniel Hemric (R)	Richard Childress Racing	Chevrolet	4
8	48	Brennan Poole	Chip Ganassi Racing	Chevrolet	3
9	11	Blake Koch	Kaulig Racing	Chevrolet	2
10	14	J. J. Yeley	TriStar Motorsports	Toyota	1

Stage 3 Laps: 110

Pos	#	Driver	Team	Make	Laps	Led	Status	Pts
1	42	Kyle Larson (i)	Chip Ganassi Racing	Chevrolet	200	137	running	0
2	22	Ryan Blaney (i)	Team Penske	Ford	200	28	running	0
3	18	Daniel Suárez (i)	Joe Gibbs Racing	Toyota	200	19	running	0
4	00	Cole Custer (R)	Stewart–Haas Racing	Ford	200	0	running	33
5	16	Ryan Reed	Roush Fenway Racing	Ford	200	5	running	33
6	9	William Byron (R)	JR Motorsports	Chevrolet	200	0	running	43
7	1	Elliott Sadler	JR Motorsports	Chevrolet	200	0	running	43
8	6	Bubba Wallace	Roush Fenway Racing	Ford	200	7	running	42
9	19	Matt Tifft (R)	Joe Gibbs Racing	Toyota	200	0	running	28
10	3	Ty Dillon (i)	Richard Childress Racing	Chevrolet	200	0	running	0
11	7	Justin Allgaier	JR Motorsports	Chevrolet	200	0	running	37
12	48	Brennan Poole	Chip Ganassi Racing	Chevrolet	199	0	running	34
13	21	Daniel Hemric (R)	Richard Childress Racing	Chevrolet	199	0	running	30
14	5	Michael Annett	JR Motorsports	Chevrolet	199	0	running	23
15	14	J. J. Yeley	TriStar Motorsports	Toyota	199	0	running	23
16	39	Ryan Sieg	RSS Racing	Chevrolet	199	0	running	21
17	90	Brandon Brown	Brandonbilt Motorsports	Chevrolet	199	0	running	20
18	96	Ben Kennedy (R)	GMS Racing	Chevrolet	199	0	running	19
19	28	Dakoda Armstrong	JGL Racing	Toyota	198	0	running	18
20	62	Brendan Gaughan	Richard Childress Racing	Chevrolet	198	0	running	17
21	4	Ross Chastain	JD Motorsports	Chevrolet	198	0	running	16
22	8	B. J. McLeod	B. J. McLeod Motorsports	Chevrolet	197	0	running	15
23	51	Jeremy Clements	Jeremy Clements Racing	Chevrolet	197	0	running	14
24	07	Ray Black Jr.	SS-Green Light Racing	Chevrolet	191	0	running	13
25	74	Mike Harmon	Mike Harmon Racing	Dodge	191	0	running	12
26	78	Jordan Anderson (i)	B. J. McLeod Motorsports	Chevrolet	188	0	suspension	0
27	0	Garrett Smithley	JD Motorsports	Chevrolet	176	0	track bar	10
28	2	Austin Dillon (i)	Richard Childress Racing	Chevrolet	175	4	steering	0
29	33	Brandon Jones	Richard Childress Racing	Chevrolet	174	0	parked	8
30	24	Dylan Lupton	JGL Racing	Toyota	170	0	running	7
31	23	Spencer Gallagher (R)	GMS Racing	Chevrolet	166	0	running	6
32	11	Blake Koch	Kaulig Racing	Chevrolet	135	0	steering	7
33	99	David Starr	BJMM with SS-Green Light Racing	Chevrolet	107	0	running	4
34	40	Chad Finchum	MBM Motorsports	Chevrolet	105	0	engine	3
35	20	Erik Jones (i)	Joe Gibbs Racing	Toyota	100	0	engine	0
36	52	Joey Gase	Jimmy Means Racing	Chevrolet	99	0	overheating	1
37	01	Harrison Rhodes	JD Motorsports	Chevrolet	91	0	engine	1
38	89	Morgan Shepherd	Shepherd Racing Ventures	Chevrolet	50	0	handling	1
39	13	Timmy Hill	MBM Motorsports	Toyota	39	0	crash	1
40	93	Jeff Green	RSS Racing	Chevrolet	13	0	electrical	1
Official race results

== Standings after the race ==
Drivers' Championship standings

Pos	Driver	Points
1	Elliott Sadler	375
2	Justin Allgaier	363 (–12)
3	William Byron	318 (–57)
4	Bubba Wallace	291 (–84)
5	Daniel Hemric	283 (–92)
6	Ryan Reed	270 (–105)
7	Brennan Poole	263 (–112)
8	Matt Tifft	255 (–120)
9	Michael Annett	248 (–127)
10	Cole Custer	242 (–133)
11	Blake Koch	227 (–148)
12	Dakoda Armstrong	209 (–166)
Official driver's standings

- Note: Only the first 12 positions are included for the driver standings.

Previous race: 2017 Hisense 4K TV 300	NASCAR Xfinity Series; 2017 season	Next race: 2017 Pocono Green 250
