= 2018 Food City 500 =

Auto race held at Bristol Motor Speedway in 2018

Race details
- Race 8 of 36 in the 2018 Monster Energy NASCAR Cup Series
- 2018 Food City 500 program cover, featuring "Young Guns" Ryan Blaney, Bubba Wallace, Chase Elliott, and William Byron, and "Veterans" Kyle Busch, Kevin Harvick, Jimmie Johnson, and Martin Truex Jr.
- Date: April 15–16, 2018
- Location: Bristol Motor Speedway in Bristol, Tennessee
- Course: Permanent racing facility
- Course length: 0.533 miles (0.858 km)
- Distance: 500 laps, 266.5 mi (429 km)
- Average speed: 77.465 miles per hour (124.668 km/h)

Pole position
Driver	Kyle Busch	Joe Gibbs Racing
- Time: 14.895

Most laps led
Driver	Kyle Larson	Chip Ganassi Racing
- Laps: 200

Winner
No. 18	Kyle Busch	Joe Gibbs Racing

Television in the United States
- Network: Fox
- Announcers: Mike Joy, Jeff Gordon and Darrell Waltrip
- Nielsen ratings: 1.4 (Overnight)

Radio in the United States
- Radio: PRN
- Booth announcers: Doug Rice, Mark Garrow and Wendy Venturini
- Turn announcers: Rob Albright (Backstretch)

The 2018 Food City 500 was a Monster Energy NASCAR Cup Series race held on April 15 and 16, 2018, at Bristol Motor Speedway in Bristol, Tennessee. The second half of the race was postponed to April 16 due to rain. Contested over 500 laps on the 0.533 miles (0.858 km) concrete short track, it was the eighth race of the 2018 Monster Energy NASCAR Cup Series season.

== Report ==
=== Background ===
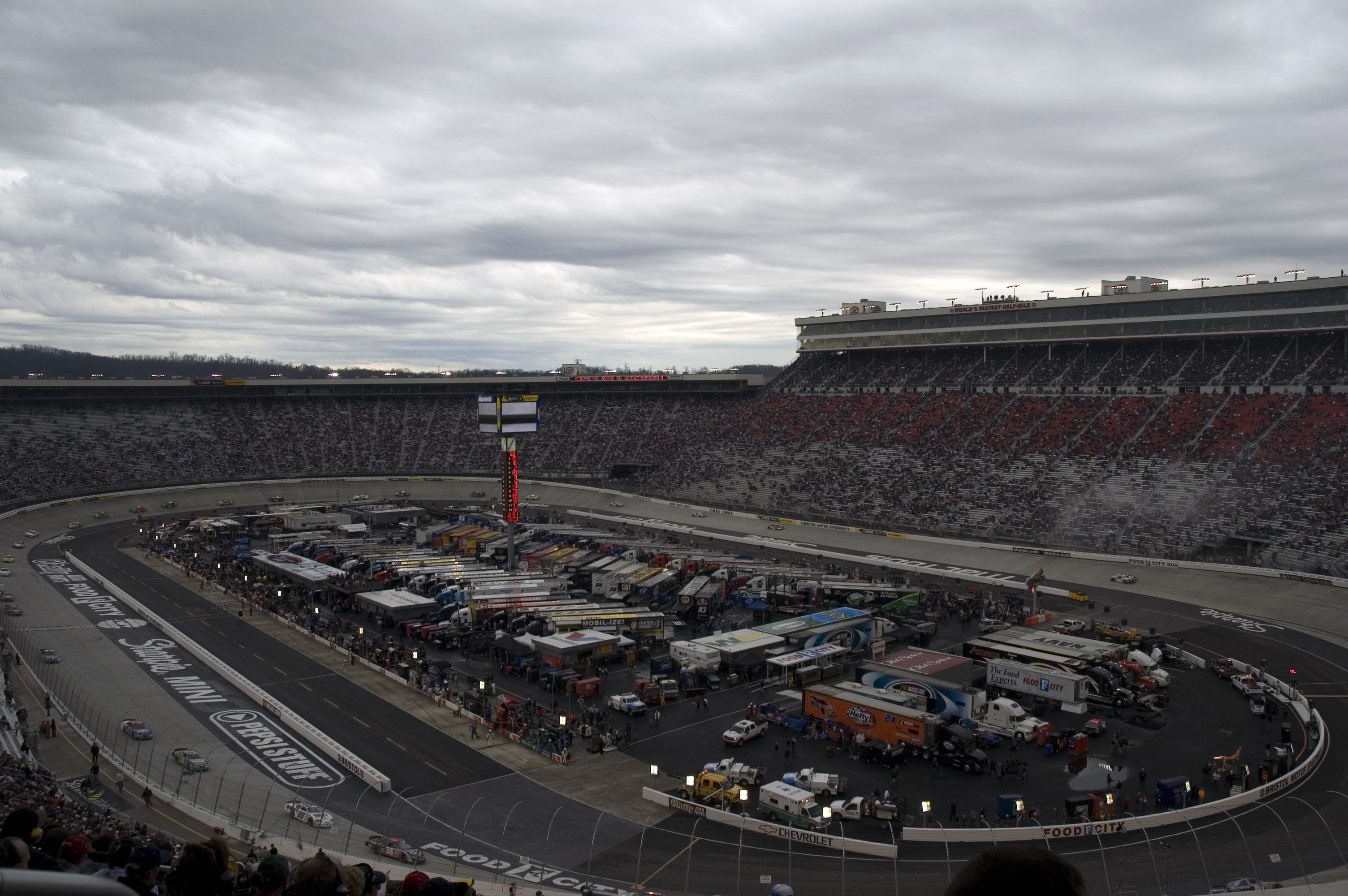
Bristol Motor Speedway, the track where the race was held.

Bristol Motor Speedway, formerly known as Bristol International Raceway and Bristol Raceway, is a NASCAR short track venue located in Bristol, Tennessee. Constructed in 1960, it held its first NASCAR race on July 30, 1961. Despite its short length, Bristol is among the most popular tracks on the NASCAR schedule because of its distinct features, which include extraordinarily steep banking, an all concrete surface, two pit roads, and stadium-like seating.

==== Entry list ====
No.	Driver	Team	Manufacturer
00	Landon Cassill	StarCom Racing	Chevrolet
1	Jamie McMurray	Chip Ganassi Racing	Chevrolet
2	Brad Keselowski	Team Penske	Ford
3	Austin Dillon	Richard Childress Racing	Chevrolet
4	Kevin Harvick	Stewart–Haas Racing	Ford
6	Trevor Bayne	Roush Fenway Racing	Ford
9	Chase Elliott	Hendrick Motorsports	Chevrolet
10	Aric Almirola	Stewart–Haas Racing	Ford
11	Denny Hamlin	Joe Gibbs Racing	Toyota
12	Ryan Blaney	Team Penske	Ford
13	Ty Dillon	Germain Racing	Chevrolet
14	Clint Bowyer	Stewart–Haas Racing	Ford
15	Ross Chastain (i)	Premium Motorsports	Chevrolet
17	Ricky Stenhouse Jr.	Roush Fenway Racing	Ford
18	Kyle Busch	Joe Gibbs Racing	Toyota
19	Daniel Suárez	Joe Gibbs Racing	Toyota
20	Erik Jones	Joe Gibbs Racing	Toyota
21	Paul Menard	Wood Brothers Racing	Ford
22	Joey Logano	Team Penske	Ford
23	Gray Gaulding	BK Racing	Toyota
24	William Byron (R)	Hendrick Motorsports	Chevrolet
31	Ryan Newman	Richard Childress Racing	Chevrolet
32	Matt DiBenedetto	Go Fas Racing	Ford
34	Michael McDowell	Front Row Motorsports	Ford
37	Chris Buescher	JTG Daugherty Racing	Chevrolet
38	David Ragan	Front Row Motorsports	Ford
41	Kurt Busch	Stewart–Haas Racing	Ford
42	Kyle Larson	Chip Ganassi Racing	Chevrolet
43	Bubba Wallace (R)	Richard Petty Motorsports	Chevrolet
47	A. J. Allmendinger	JTG Daugherty Racing	Chevrolet
48	Jimmie Johnson	Hendrick Motorsports	Chevrolet
51	Harrison Rhodes	Rick Ware Racing	Toyota
55	Reed Sorenson	Premium Motorsports	Chevrolet
66	Chad Finchum (i)	MBM Motorsports	Toyota
72	Corey LaJoie	TriStar Motorsports	Chevrolet
78	Martin Truex Jr.	Furniture Row Racing	Toyota
88	Alex Bowman	Hendrick Motorsports	Chevrolet
95	Kasey Kahne	Leavine Family Racing	Chevrolet
96	D. J. Kennington	Gaunt Brothers Racing	Toyota
Official entry list

== First practice ==
Ryan Blaney was the fastest in the first practice session with a time of 14.774 seconds and a speed of 129.877 mph (209.017 km/h).

Pos	No.	Driver	Team	Manufacturer	Time	Speed
1	12	Ryan Blaney	Team Penske	Ford	14.774	129.877
2	20	Erik Jones	Joe Gibbs Racing	Toyota	14.774	129.877
3	41	Kurt Busch	Stewart–Haas Racing	Ford	14.799	129.657
Official first practice results

== Qualifying ==
Kyle Busch scored the pole for the race with a time of 14.895 and a speed of 128.822 mph (207.319 km/h).

=== Qualifying results ===
Pos	No.	Driver	Team	Manufacturer	R1	R2	R3
1	18	Kyle Busch	Joe Gibbs Racing	Toyota	14.879	14.878	14.895
2	41	Kurt Busch	Stewart–Haas Racing	Ford	14.946	14.871	14.897
3	2	Brad Keselowski	Team Penske	Ford	15.124	14.988	14.960
4	17	Ricky Stenhouse Jr.	Roush Fenway Racing	Ford	15.074	15.052	14.961
5	12	Ryan Blaney	Team Penske	Ford	15.051	14.953	14.969
6	42	Kyle Larson	Chip Ganassi Racing	Chevrolet	15.197	15.018	14.985
7	21	Paul Menard	Wood Brothers Racing	Ford	15.042	15.066	14.993
8	88	Alex Bowman	Hendrick Motorsports	Chevrolet	15.051	15.053	15.010
9	34	Michael McDowell	Front Row Motorsports	Ford	15.108	15.183	15.029
10	22	Joey Logano	Team Penske	Ford	15.004	15.176	15.041
11	24	William Byron (R)	Hendrick Motorsports	Chevrolet	15.190	15.043	15.053
12	19	Daniel Suárez	Joe Gibbs Racing	Toyota	15.132	15.069	15.153
13	20	Erik Jones	Joe Gibbs Racing	Toyota	15.195	15.071	—
14	14	Clint Bowyer	Stewart–Haas Racing	Ford	15.091	15.086	—
15	95	Kasey Kahne	Leavine Family Racing	Chevrolet	15.178	15.095	—
16	9	Chase Elliott	Hendrick Motorsports	Chevrolet	15.138	15.105	—
17	48	Jimmie Johnson	Hendrick Motorsports	Chevrolet	15.103	15.112	—
18	47	A. J. Allmendinger	JTG Daugherty Racing	Chevrolet	15.139	15.136	—
19	10	Aric Almirola	Stewart–Haas Racing	Ford	15.183	15.144	—
20	43	Bubba Wallace (R)	Richard Petty Motorsports	Chevrolet	15.163	15.178	—
21	3	Austin Dillon	Richard Childress Racing	Chevrolet	15.216	15.181	—
22	37	Chris Buescher	JTG Daugherty Racing	Chevrolet	15.190	15.196	—
23	38	David Ragan	Front Row Motorsports	Ford	15.135	15.204	—
24	32	Matt DiBenedetto	Go Fas Racing	Ford	15.223	15.285	—
25	31	Ryan Newman	Richard Childress Racing	Chevrolet	15.383	—	—
26	1	Jamie McMurray	Chip Ganassi Racing	Chevrolet	15.410	—	—
27	11	Denny Hamlin	Joe Gibbs Racing	Toyota	15.256	—	—
28	78	Martin Truex Jr.	Furniture Row Racing	Toyota	15.257	—	—
29	15	Ross Chastain (i)	Premium Motorsports	Chevrolet	15.320	—	—
30	23	Gray Gaulding	BK Racing	Toyota	15.358	—	—
31	00	Landon Cassill	StarCom Racing	Chevrolet	15.360	—	—
32	13	Ty Dillon	Germain Racing	Chevrolet	15.477	—	—
33	6	Trevor Bayne	Roush Fenway Racing	Ford	15.499	—	—
34	72	Corey LaJoie	TriStar Motorsports	Chevrolet	15.755	—	—
35	96	D. J. Kennington	Gaunt Brothers Racing	Toyota	15.807	—	—
36	55	Reed Sorenson	Premium Motorsports	Chevrolet	15.810	—	—
37	51	Harrison Rhodes	Rick Ware Racing	Toyota	16.253	—	—
38	66	Chad Finchum (i)	MBM Motorsports	Toyota	16.735	—	—
39	4	Kevin Harvick	Stewart–Haas Racing	Ford	0.000	—	—
Official qualifying results

== Practice (post-qualifying) ==
=== Second practice ===
Kyle Larson was the fastest in the second practice session with a time of 14.874 seconds and a speed of 129.004 mph (207.612 km/h).

Pos	No.	Driver	Team	Manufacturer	Time	Speed
1	42	Kyle Larson	Chip Ganassi Racing	Chevrolet	14.874	129.004
2	78	Martin Truex Jr.	Furniture Row Racing	Toyota	14.880	128.952
3	10	Aric Almirola	Stewart–Haas Racing	Ford	14.881	128.943
Official second practice results

=== Final practice ===
David Ragan was the fastest in the final practice session with a time of 15.051 seconds and a speed of 127.487 mph (205.170 km/h).

Pos	No.	Driver	Team	Manufacturer	Time	Speed
1	38	David Ragan	Front Row Motorsports	Ford	15.051	127.487
2	9	Chase Elliott	Hendrick Motorsports	Chevrolet	15.100	127.073
3	11	Denny Hamlin	Joe Gibbs Racing	Toyota	15.109	126.997
Official final practice results

== Race results ==
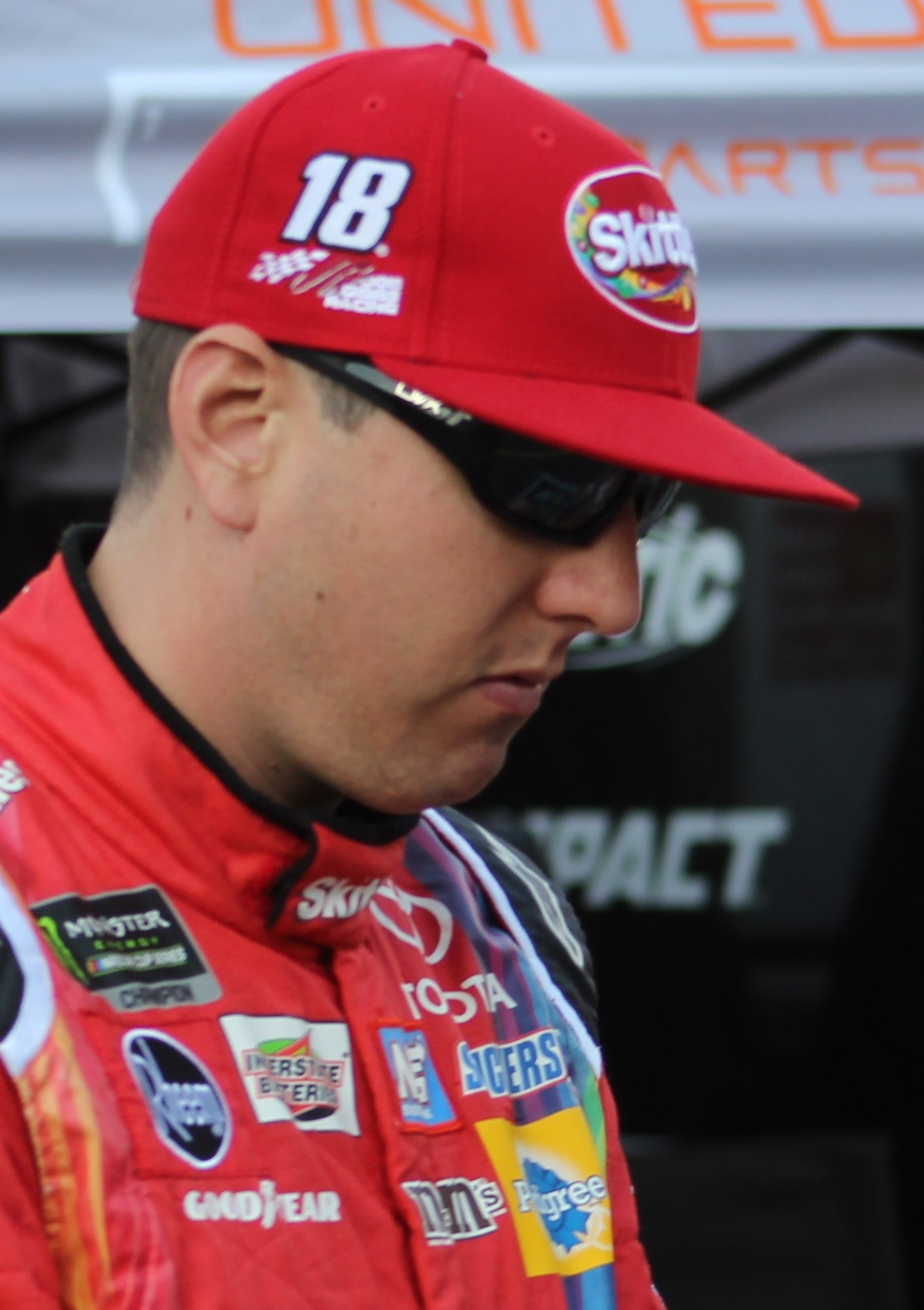
Kyle Busch won the race from the pole position.

=== Stage Results ===
Stage 1 Laps: 125

Pos	No	Driver	Team	Manufacturer	Points
1	2	Brad Keselowski	Team Penske	Ford	10
2	31	Ryan Newman	Richard Childress Racing	Chevrolet	9
3	14	Clint Bowyer	Stewart–Haas Racing	Ford	8
4	47	A. J. Allmendinger	JTG Daugherty Racing	Chevrolet	7
5	42	Kyle Larson	Chip Ganassi Racing	Chevrolet	6
6	20	Erik Jones	Joe Gibbs Racing	Toyota	5
7	48	Jimmie Johnson	Hendrick Motorsports	Chevrolet	4
8	10	Aric Almirola	Stewart–Haas Racing	Ford	3
9	17	Kurt Busch	Stewart–Haas Racing	Ford	2
10	41	Ricky Stenhouse Jr.	Roush Fenway Racing	Ford	1
Official stage one results

Stage 2 Laps: 125

Pos	No	Driver	Team	Manufacturer	Points
1	2	Brad Keselowski	Team Penske	Ford	10
2	18	Kyle Busch	Joe Gibbs Racing	Toyota	9
3	48	Jimmie Johnson	Hendrick Motorsports	Chevrolet	8
4	11	Denny Hamlin	Joe Gibbs Racing	Toyota	7
5	42	Kyle Larson	Chip Ganassi Racing	Chevrolet	6
6	17	Ricky Stenhouse Jr.	Roush Fenway Racing	Ford	5
7	88	Alex Bowman	Hendrick Motorsports	Chevrolet	4
8	4	Kevin Harvick	Stewart–Haas Racing	Ford	3
9	3	Austin Dillon	Richard Childress Racing	Chevrolet	2
10	43	Bubba Wallace (R)	Richard Petty Motorsports	Chevrolet	1
Official stage two results

=== Final Stage Results ===
Stage 3 Laps: 250

Pos	Grid	No	Driver	Team	Manufacturer	Laps	Points
1	1	18	Kyle Busch	Joe Gibbs Racing	Toyota	500	49
2	6	42	Kyle Larson	Chip Ganassi Racing	Chevrolet	500	47
3	17	48	Jimmie Johnson	Hendrick Motorsports	Chevrolet	500	46
4	4	17	Ricky Stenhouse Jr.	Roush Fenway Racing	Ford	500	39
5	8	88	Alex Bowman	Hendrick Motorsports	Chevrolet	500	36
6	19	10	Aric Almirola	Stewart-Hass Racing	Ford	500	34
7	39	4	Kevin Harvick	Stewart–Haas Racing	Ford	500	33
8	14	14	Clint Bowyer	Stewart–Haas Racing	Ford	500	37
9	10	22	Joey Logano	Team Penske	Ford	500	28
10	30	31	Ryan Newman	Richard Childress Racing	Chevrolet	500	36
11	12	19	Daniel Suárez	Joe Gibbs Racing	Toyota	500	26
12	23	38	David Ragan	Front Row Motorsports	Ford	500	25
13	7	21	Paul Menard	Wood Brothers Racing	Ford	499	24
14	25	11	Denny Hamlin	Joe Gibbs Racing	Toyota	499	30
15	21	3	Austin Dillon	Richard Childress Racing	Chevrolet	499	24
16	20	43	Bubba Wallace (R)	Richard Petty Motorsports	Chevrolet	499	22
17	18	47	A. J. Allmendinger	JTG Daugherty Racing	Chevrolet	499	27
18	11	24	William Byron (R)	Hendrick Motorsports	Chevrolet	498	19
19	31	1	Jamie McMurray	Chip Ganassi Racing	Chevrolet	498	18
20	29	00	Landon Cassill	StarCom Racing	Chevrolet	498	17
21	24	32	Matt DiBenedetto	Go Fas Racing	Ford	497	16
22	2	41	Kurt Busch	Stewart–Haas Racing	Ford	496	17
23	3	2	Brad Keselowski	Team Penske	Ford	495	34
24	33	6	Trevor Bayne	Roush Fenway Racing	Ford	495	13
25	34	72	Corey LaJoie	TriStar Motorsports	Chevrolet	494	12
26	13	20	Erik Jones	Joe Gibbs Racing	Toyota	494	16
27	35	96	D. J. Kennington	Gaunt Brothers Racing	Toyota	482	10
28	32	13	Ty Dillon	Germain Racing	Chevrolet	475	9
29	16	9	Chase Elliott	Hendrick Motorsports	Chevrolet	473	8
30	26	78	Martin Truex Jr.	Furniture Row Racing	Toyota	458	7
31	28	23	Gray Gaulding	BK Racing	Toyota	448	6
32	36	55	Reed Sorenson	Premium Motorsports	Chevrolet	342	5
33	38	66	Chad Finchum (i)	MBM Motorsports	Toyota	335	0
34	15	95	Kasey Kahne	Leavine Family Racing	Chevrolet	236	3
35	5	12	Ryan Blaney	Team Penske	Ford	117	2
36	22	37	Chris Buescher	JTG Daugherty Racing	Chevrolet	116	1
37	37	51	Harrison Rhodes	Rick Ware Racing	Toyota	115	1
38	9	34	Michael McDowell	Front Row Motorsports	Ford	9	1
39	29	15	Ross Chastain (i)	Premium Motorsports	Chevrolet	3	0
Official race results

=== Race statistics ===
- Lead changes: 8 among different drivers
- Cautions/Laps: 13 for 114
- Red flags: 4 for 18 hours 58 minutes and 48 seconds
- Time of race: 3 hours, 26 minutes and 25 seconds
- Average speed: 77.465 miles per hour (124.668 km/h)

== Media ==
=== Television ===
Fox Sports covered their 18th race at the Bristol Motor Speedway. Mike Joy, five-time Bristol winner Jeff Gordon and 12-time Bristol winner – and all-time Bristol race winner – Darrell Waltrip had the call in the booth for the race. Jamie Little, Vince Welch and Matt Yocum handled the pit road duties for the television side.

Fox Sports Television
Booth announcers	Pit reporters
Lap-by-lap: Mike Joy; Color-commentator: Jeff Gordon; Color commentator: Darrell Waltrip	Jamie Little; Vince Welch; Matt Yocum

=== Radio ===
PRN had the radio call for the race which was also simulcasted on Sirius XM NASCAR Radio. Doug Rice, Mark Garrow and Wendy Venturini called the race in the booth when the field was racing down the frontstretch. Rob Albright called the race from atop the turn 3 suites when the field raced down the backstretch. Brad Gillie, Brett Mcmillan, Jim Noble, and Steve Richards covered the action on pit lane.

PRN Radio
Booth announcers	Turn announcers	Pit reporters
Lead announcer: Doug Rice; Announcer: Mark Garrow; Announcer: Wendy Venturini	Backstretch: Rob Albright	Brad Gillie; Brett McMillan; Jim Noble; Steve Richards

== Standings after the race ==
Drivers' Championship standings

	Pos	Driver	Points
	1	Kyle Busch	365
	2	Joey Logano	306 (–59)
1	3	Kevin Harvick	290 (–75)
2	4	Clint Bowyer	286 (–79)
2	5	Brad Keselowski	271 (–94)
3	6	Ryan Blaney	267 (–98)
2	7	Martin Truex Jr.	257 (–108)
1	8	Denny Hamlin	252 (–113)
1	9	Kyle Larson	249 (–116)
2	10	Kurt Busch	241 (–124)
1	11	Aric Almirola	211 (–154)
1	12	Erik Jones	209 (–156)
1	13	Alex Bowman	190 (–175)
1	14	Austin Dillon	183 (–182)
2	15	Ryan Newman	181 (–184)
	16	Paul Menard	170 (–195)
Official driver's standings

Manufacturers' Championship standings

	Pos	Manufacturer	Points
1	1	Toyota	292
1	2	Ford	286 (–6)
	3	Chevrolet	262 (–30)
Official manufacturers' standings

- Note: Only the first 16 positions are included for the driver standings.
- . – Driver has clinched a position in the Monster Energy NASCAR Cup Series playoffs.

Previous race: 2018 O'Reilly Auto Parts 500	Monster Energy NASCAR Cup Series; 2018 season	Next race: 2018 Toyota Owners 400
