= 2019 Boyd Gaming 300 =

Race details
- Race 3 of 33 in the 2019 NASCAR Xfinity Series season
- Date: March 2, 2019
- Location: Las Vegas Motor Speedway in Las Vegas
- Course: Permanent racing facility
- Course length: 1.5 miles (2.4 km)
- Distance: 213 laps, 319.5 mi (511.2 km)

Pole position
Driver	Cole Custer	Stewart-Haas Racing with Biagi-DenBeste Racing
- Time: N/A

Most laps led
Driver	Kyle Busch	Joe Gibbs Racing
- Laps: 98

Winner
No. 18	Kyle Busch	Joe Gibbs Racing

Television in the United States
- Network: FS1

Radio in the United States
- Radio: MRN

The 2019 Boyd Gaming 300 was a NASCAR Xfinity Series race held on March 2, 2019, at Las Vegas Motor Speedway in Las Vegas. Contested over 213 laps due to an overtime finish on the 1.5 mi (2.4 km) asphalt intermediate speedway, it was the third race of the 2019 NASCAR Xfinity Series season.

== Entry list ==
No.	Driver	Team	Manufacturer
00	Cole Custer	Stewart-Haas Racing with Biagi-DenBeste Racing	Ford
0	Garrett Smithley	JD Motorsports	Chevrolet
01	Stephen Leicht	JD Motorsports	Chevrolet
1	Michael Annett	JR Motorsports	Chevrolet
2	Tyler Reddick	Richard Childress Racing	Chevrolet
4	Ross Chastain	JD Motorsports	Chevrolet
5	Matt Mills (R)	B. J. McLeod Motorsports	Chevrolet
07	Ray Black Jr.	SS-Green Light Racing	Chevrolet
7	Justin Allgaier	JR Motorsports	Chevrolet
08	Gray Gaulding (R)	SS-Green Light Racing	Chevrolet
8	Zane Smith	JR Motorsports	Chevrolet
9	Noah Gragson (R)	JR Motorsports	Chevrolet
10	Austin Dillon (i)	Kaulig Racing	Chevrolet
11	Justin Haley (R)	Kaulig Racing	Chevrolet
13	Stan Mullis	MBM Motorsports	Toyota
15	B. J. McLeod	JD Motorsports	Chevrolet
17	Bayley Currey (i)	Rick Ware Racing	Chevrolet
18	Kyle Busch (i)	Joe Gibbs Racing	Toyota
19	Brandon Jones	Joe Gibbs Racing	Toyota
20	Christopher Bell	Joe Gibbs Racing	Toyota
22	Austin Cindric	Team Penske	Ford
23	John Hunter Nemechek (R)	GMS Racing	Chevrolet
35	Joey Gase	MBM Motorsports	Toyota
36	Josh Williams	DGM Racing	Chevrolet
38	Jeff Green	RSS Racing	Chevrolet
39	Ryan Sieg	RSS Racing	Chevrolet
42	Chad Finchum	MBM Motorsports	Toyota
51	Jeremy Clements	Jeremy Clements Racing	Chevrolet
52	David Starr	Jimmy Means Racing	Chevrolet
66	Timmy Hill	MBM Motorsports	Toyota
74	Mike Harmon	Mike Harmon Racing	Chevrolet
78	Vinnie Miller	B. J. McLeod Motorsports	Chevrolet
86	Brandon Brown (R)	Brandonbilt Motorsports	Chevrolet
89	Morgan Shepherd	Shepherd Racing Ventures	Chevrolet
90	Donald Theetge	DGM Racing	Chevrolet
93	Josh Bilicki	RSS Racing	Chevrolet
98	Chase Briscoe (R)	Stewart-Haas Racing with Biagi-DenBeste Racing	Ford
99	Jairo Avila Jr.	B. J. McLeod Motorsports	Chevrolet

== Practice ==
=== First practice ===
Justin Allgaier was the fastest in the first practice session with a time of 30.212 seconds and a speed of 178.737 mph (287.649 km/h).

Pos	No.	Driver	Team	Manufacturer	Time	Speed
1	7	Justin Allgaier	JR Motorsports	Chevrolet	30.212	178.737
2	18	Kyle Busch (i)	Joe Gibbs Racing	Toyota	30.228	178.642
3	2	Tyler Reddick	Richard Childress Racing	Chevrolet	30.228	178.642

=== Final practice ===
Justin Haley was the fastest in the final practice session with a time of 29.949 seconds and a speed of 180.307 mph (290.176 km/h).

Pos	No.	Driver	Team	Manufacturer	Time	Speed
1	11	Justin Haley (R)	Kaulig Racing	Chevrolet	29.949	180.307
2	10	Austin Dillon (i)	Kaulig Racing	Chevrolet	30.304	178.194
3	18	Kyle Busch (i)	Joe Gibbs Racing	Toyota	30.341	177.977

== Qualifying ==
Qualifying was canceled due to rain. Cole Custer was awarded the pole for the second consecutive race due to 2018 owner's points. Again, Chad Finchum qualified 2nd.

=== Qualifying results ===
Pos	No	Driver	Team	Manufacturer	Time
1	00	Cole Custer	Stewart-Haas Racing with Biagi-DenBeste Racing	Ford	0.000
2	42	Chad Finchum	MBM Motorsports	Toyota	0.000
3	20	Christopher Bell	Joe Gibbs Racing	Toyota	0.000
4	9	Noah Gragson (R)	JR Motorsports	Chevrolet	0.000
5	22	Austin Cindric	Team Penske	Ford	0.000
6	8	Zane Smith	JR Motorsports	Chevrolet	0.000
7	7	Justin Allgaier	JR Motorsports	Chevrolet	0.000
8	18	Kyle Busch (i)	Joe Gibbs Racing	Toyota	0.000
9	19	Brandon Jones	Joe Gibbs Racing	Toyota	0.000
10	23	John Hunter Nemechek (R)	GMS Racing	Chevrolet	0.000
11	86	Brandon Brown (R)	Brandonbilt Motorsports	Chevrolet	0.000
12	2	Tyler Reddick	Richard Childress Racing	Chevrolet	0.000
13	11	Justin Haley (R)	Kaulig Racing	Chevrolet	0.000
14	78	Vinnie Miller	B. J. McLeod Motorsports	Chevrolet	0.000
15	4	Ross Chastain	JD Motorsports	Chevrolet	0.000
16	1	Michael Annett	JR Motorsports	Chevrolet	0.000
17	51	Jeremy Clements	Jeremy Clements Racing	Chevrolet	0.000
18	39	Ryan Sieg	RSS Racing	Chevrolet	0.000
19	36	Josh Williams	DGM Racing	Chevrolet	0.000
20	07	Ray Black Jr.	SS-Green Light Racing	Chevrolet	0.000
21	17	Bayley Currey (i)	Rick Ware Racing	Chevrolet	0.000
22	0	Garrett Smithley	JD Motorsports	Chevrolet	0.000
23	90	Donald Theetge	DGM Racing	Chevrolet	0.000
24	99	Jairo Avila Jr.	B. J. McLeod Motorsports	Chevrolet	0.000
25	5	Matt Mills (R)	B. J. McLeod Motorsports	Chevrolet	0.000
26	38	Jeff Green	RSS Racing	Chevrolet	0.000
27	52	David Starr	Jimmy Means Racing	Chevrolet	0.000
28	98	Chase Briscoe (R)	Stewart-Haas Racing with Biagi-DenBeste Racing	Ford	0.000
29	15	B. J. McLeod	JD Motorsports	Chevrolet	0.000
30	01	Stephen Leicht	JD Motorsports	Chevrolet	0.000
31	10	Austin Dillon (i)	Kaulig Racing	Chevrolet	0.000
32	93	Josh Bilicki	RSS Racing	Chevrolet	0.000
33	35	Joey Gase	MBM Motorsports	Toyota	0.000
34	66	Timmy Hill	MBM Motorsports	Toyota	0.000
35	08	Gray Gaulding (R)	SS-Green Light Racing	Chevrolet	0.000
36	13	Stan Mullis	MBM Motorsports	Toyota	0.000
37	74	Mike Harmon	Mike Harmon Racing	Chevrolet	0.000
38	89	Morgan Shepherd	Shepherd Racing Ventures	Chevrolet	0.000

== Race ==
=== Stage results ===
Stage One Laps: 45

Pos	No	Driver	Team	Manufacturer	Points
1	00	Cole Custer	Stewart-Haas Racing with Biagi-DenBeste	Ford	10
2	19	Brandon Jones	Joe Gibbs Racing	Toyota	9
3	2	Tyler Reddick	Richard Childress Racing	Chevrolet	8
4	20	Christopher Bell	Joe Gibbs Racing	Toyota	7
5	23	John Hunter Nemechek (R)	GMS Racing	Chevrolet	6
6	1	Michael Annett	JR Motorsports	Chevrolet	5
7	7	Justin Allgaier	JR Motorsports	Chevrolet	4
8	22	Austin Cindric	Team Penske	Ford	3
9	11	Justin Haley (R)	Kaulig Racing	Chevrolet	2
10	9	Noah Gragson (R)	JR Motorsports	Chevrolet	1

Stage Two Laps: 45

Pos	No	Driver	Team	Manufacturer	Points
1	2	Tyler Reddick	Richard Childress Racing	Chevrolet	10
2	20	Christopher Bell	Joe Gibbs Racing	Toyota	9
3	18	Kyle Busch (i)	Joe Gibbs Racing	Toyota	0
4	00	Cole Custer	Stewart-Haas Racing with Biagi-DenBeste	Ford	7
5	23	John Hunter Nemechek (R)	GMS Racing	Chevrolet	6
6	7	Justin Allgaier	JR Motorsports	Chevrolet	5
7	19	Brandon Jones	Joe Gibbs Racing	Toyota	4
8	1	Michael Annett	JR Motorsports	Chevrolet	3
9	39	Ryan Sieg	RSS Racing	Chevrolet	2
10	98	Chase Briscoe (R)	Stewart-Haas Racing with Biagi-DenBeste	Ford	1

=== Final Stage results ===
Stage Three Laps: 123

Pos	Grid	No	Driver	Team	Manufacturer	Laps	Points
1	8	18	Kyle Busch (i)	Joe Gibbs Racing	Toyota	213	0
2	10	23	John Hunter Nemechek (R)	GMS Racing	Chevrolet	213	47
3	4	9	Noah Gragson (R)	JR Motorsports	Chevrolet	213	35
4	31	10	Austin Dillon (i)	Kaulig Racing	Chevrolet	213	0
5	16	1	Michael Annett	JR Motorsports	Chevrolet	213	40
6	18	39	Ryan Sieg	RSS Racing	Chevrolet	213	33
7	15	4	Ross Chastain	JD Motorsports	Chevrolet	213	30
8	28	98	Chase Briscoe (R)	Stewart-Haas Racing with Biagi-DenBeste	Ford	213	30
9	1	00	Cole Custer	Stewart-Haas Racing with Biagi-DenBeste	Ford	213	45
10	13	11	Justin Haley (R)	Kaulig Racing	Chevrolet	212	29
11	20	07	Ray Black Jr.	SS-Green Light Racing	Chevrolet	211	26
12	35	08	Gray Gaulding	SS-Green Light Racing	Chevrolet	211	25
13	3	20	Christopher Bell	Joe Gibbs Racing	Toyota	210	40
14	12	2	Tyler Reddick	Richard Childress Racing	Chevrolet	208	41
15	17	51	Jeremy Clements	Jeremy Clements Racing	Chevrolet	208	22
16	19	36	Josh Williams	DGM Racing	Chevrolet	208	21
17	11	86	Brandon Brown (R)	Brandonbilt Motorsports	Chevrolet	208	20
18	22	0	Garrett Smithley	JD Motorsports	Chevrolet	208	19
19	27	52	David Starr	Jimmy Means Racing	Chevrolet	208	18
20	29	15	B. J. McLeod	JD Motorsports	Chevrolet	208	17
21	2	42	Chad Finchum	MBM Motorsports	Toyota	207	16
22	5	22	Austin Cindric	Team Penske	Ford	206	18
23	34	66	Timmy Hill	MBM Motorsports	Toyota	206	14
24	6	8	Zane Smith	JR Motorsports	Chevrolet	205	13
25	24	99	Jairo Avila Jr.	B. J. McLeod Motorsports	Chevrolet	205	12
26	14	78	Vinnie Miller	B. J. McLeod Motorsports	Chevrolet	202	11
27	30	01	Stephen Leicht	JD Motorsports	Chevrolet	200	10
28	9	19	Brandon Jones	Joe Gibbs Racing	Toyota	198	22
29	25	5	Matt Mills (R)	B. J. McLeod Motorsports	Chevrolet	196	8
30	37	74	Mike Harmon	Mike Harmon Racing	Chevrolet	194	7
31	7	7	Justin Allgaier	JR Motorsports	Chevrolet	119	15
32	26	38	Jeff Green	RSS Racing	Chevrolet	99	5
33	38	89	Morgan Shepherd	Shepherd Racing Ventures	Chevrolet	61	4
34	21	17	Bayley Currey (i)	Rick Ware Racing	Chevrolet	24	0
35	36	13	Stan Mullis	MBM Motorsports	Toyota	14	2
36	32	93	Josh Bilicki	RSS Racing	Chevrolet	13	1
37	23	90	Donald Theetge	DGM Racing	Chevrolet	1	1
38	33	35	Joey Gase	MBM Motorsports	Toyota	1	1

Previous race: 2019 Rinnai 250	NASCAR Xfinity Series; 2019 season	Next race: 2019 iK9 Service Dog 200
