= Chad Finchum =

American racing driver (born 1994)

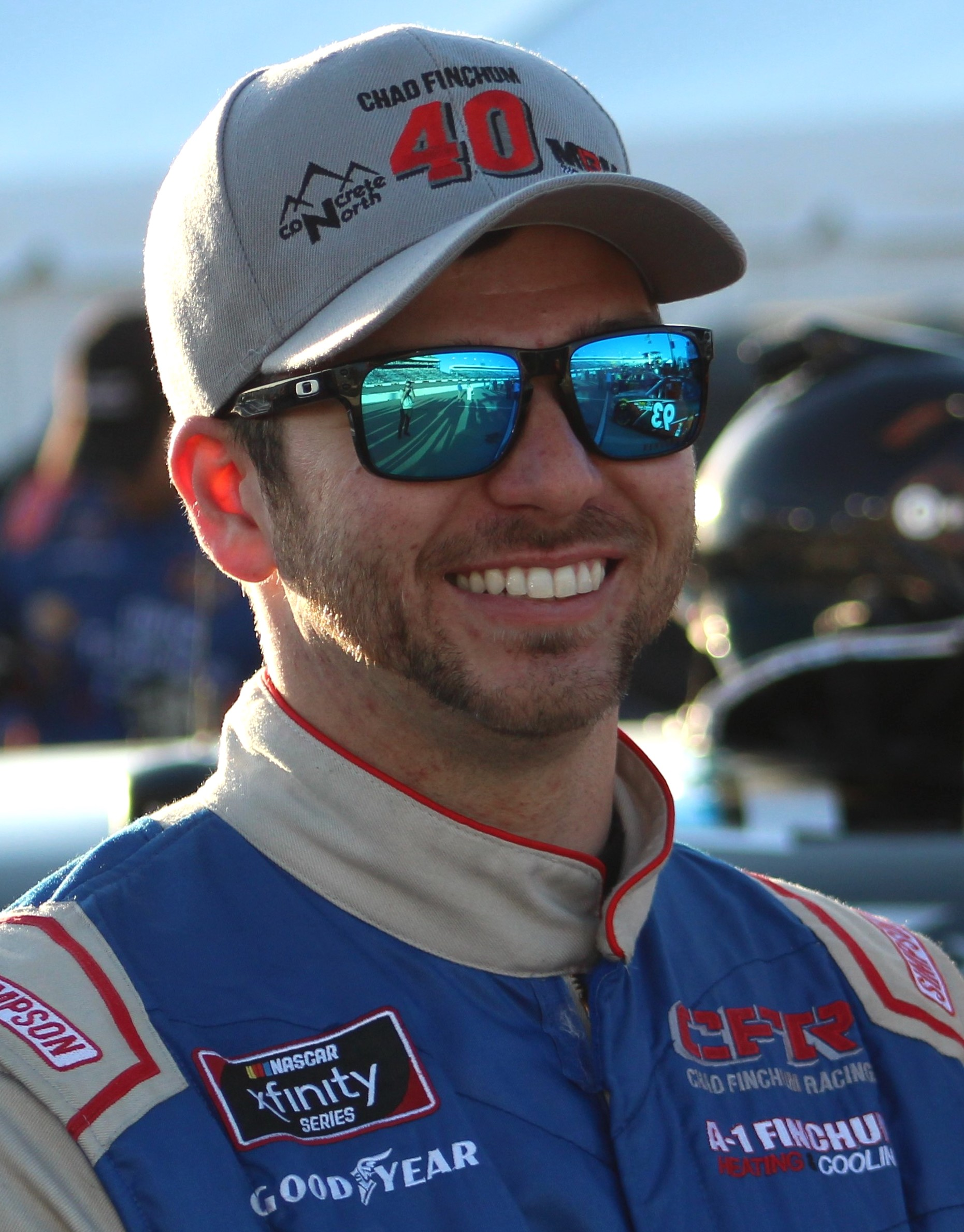
- Finchum at Richmond Raceway in 2018
- Born: James Chadwick Finchum; September 22, 1994 (age 32); Knoxville, Tennessee, U.S.
- Height: 5 ft 7 in (1.70 m)
- Weight: 160 lb (73 kg)
- Achievements: 2010 NASCAR Weekly Series Tennessee Champion

NASCAR Cup Series career
- 20 races run over 6 years
- 2026 position: 52nd
- Best finish: 40th (2025)
- First race: 2018 Food City 500 (Bristol)
- Last race: 2026 Season Finale 400 (Homestead)
| Wins | Top tens | Poles |
|---|---|---|
| 0 | 0 | 0 |

NASCAR O'Reilly Auto Parts Series career
- 117 races run over 9 years
- 2026 position: 82nd
- Best finish: 26th (2019, 2020)
- First race: 2017 OneMain Financial 200 (Dover)
- Last race: 2026 Bennett Transportation & Logistics 250 (Atlanta)
| Wins | Top tens | Poles |
|---|---|---|
| 0 | 0 | 0 |

ARCA Menards Series East career
- 17 races run over 6 years
- Best finish: 24th (2016)
- First race: 2011 Kevin Whitaker Chevrolet 150 (Greenville-Pickens)
- Last race: 2017 Zombie Auto 125 (Bristol)
- First win: 2016 PittLite 125 (Bristol)
| Wins | Top tens | Poles |
|---|---|---|
| 1 | 5 | 0 |
- Statistics up to date as of November 8, 2026.

James Chadwick Finchum (born September 22, 1994) is an American professional stock car racing driver. He last competed part-time in the NASCAR Cup Series, driving the No. 66 Ford Mustang Dark Horse for Garage 66, and part-time in the NASCAR O'Reilly Auto Parts Series, driving the No. 35/55 Chevrolet Camaro SS for Joey Gase Motorsports with Scott Osteen. He has also previously competed in the ARCA Menards Series East.

== Racing career ==
=== Early years ===
Finchum began racing at the age of seven, starting his career racing go-karts at Dumplin Valley Raceway in Tennessee. By the age of thirteen he had logged 200 go-kart wins on dirt and asphalt. He then moved to full-bodied cars, often racing late models at Kingsport Speedway in Tennessee, and also competed in Bandolero and Legends cars in Charlotte Motor Speedway's Summer Shootout. He would win the Tennessee NASCAR Whelen All-American Series championship in 2010.

=== NASCAR ===
Finchum drove his first four K&N Pro Series East races in 2011 with Lori Williams, who had given Daniel Suárez and Jesus Hernandez rides previously. Finchum scored two top-ten finishes that first year, finishing seventh at Bowman Gray Stadium and Gresham Motorsports Park. He joined Spraker Racing in 2012, finishing seventh again at Bristol Motor Speedway but not finding success in his other three starts. One start with Spraker in 2013 yielded a DNF at Bristol. Finchum then started 2015 driving for his own team but then associated with Martin-McClure Racing later in the year. In only his third start with the team, and his first in 2016, Finchum won the K&N race at Bristol. Starting from the fourth position, Finchum passed polesitter and leader Harrison Burton thirteen laps into the race and never looked back. In a late restart Finchum held off future NASCAR national series drivers Kyle Benjamin, Justin Haley, Kaz Grala and Todd Gilliland. Focusing on the Xfinity Series in 2017, Finchum ran one K&N race, recording a fifth at Bristol.

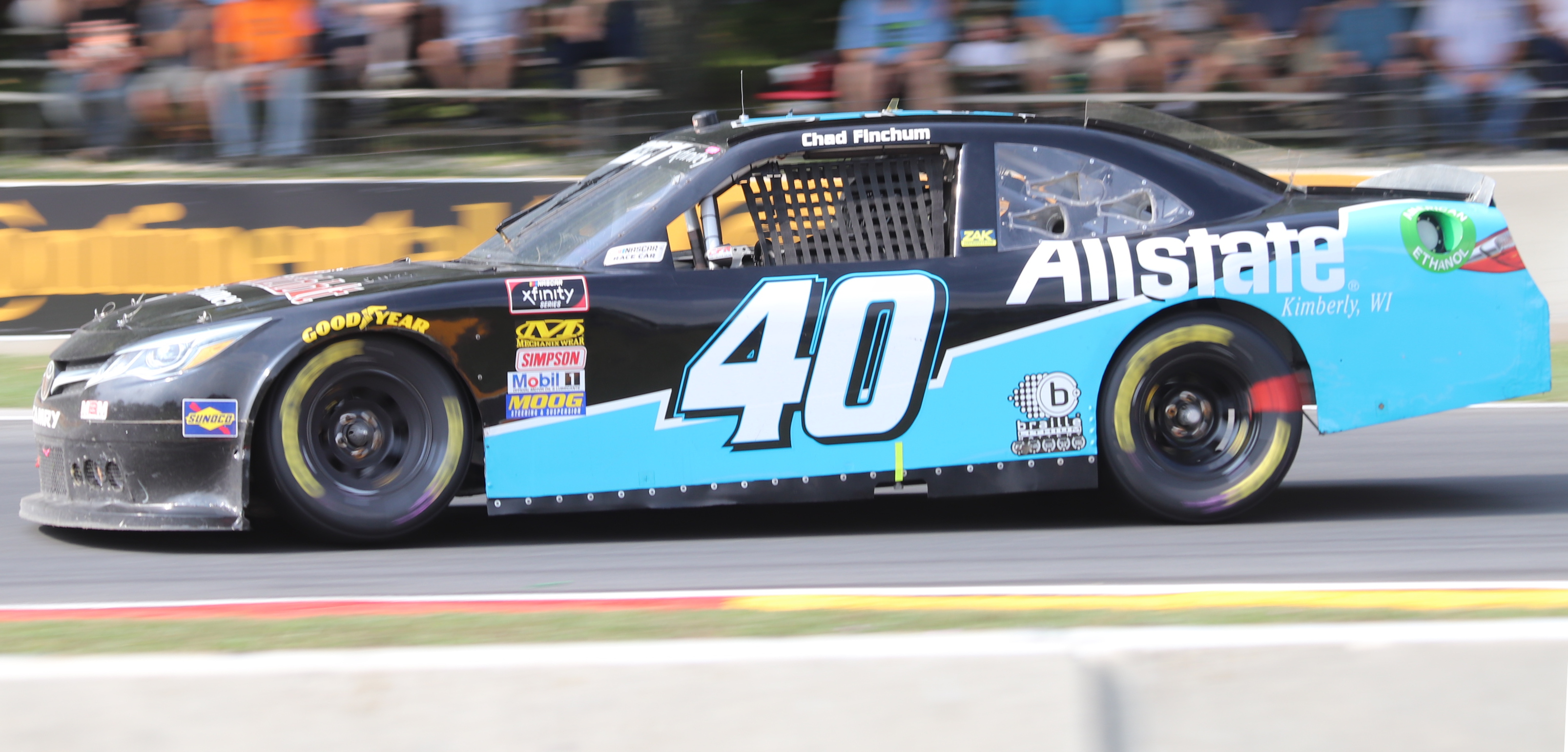
Finchum racing the No. 40 in 2018 at Road America

Finchum, in conjunction with his K&N Pro Series East team Team McClure Inc., signed on for two races with MBM Motorsports including a debut race at Dover International Speedway. Despite falling out with engine problems at Dover, Finchum was approved for 1.5-mile tracks, yielding another start at Kentucky Speedway. Finchum made five more starts in 2017 ranging from 1-mile Dover to 2.5-mile Indianapolis Motor Speedway, cracking the top thirty three times.

In late November 2017, Finchum was announced as the full-time driver of MBM's No. 40 entry for the 2018 NASCAR Xfinity Series season. He led second practice at Daytona International Speedway in July. He finished the year 30th in final point standings.

On March 27, 2018, Finchum announced in a Bristol Motor Speedway promotional video that he would make his Monster Energy NASCAR Cup Series debut at that track in April 2018. The run came in the No. 66 car for MBM Motorsports, whom he also drives for in the NASCAR Xfinity Series. Bristol was a track that Finchum was especially excited to make his debut at, as he considers it a "home track". After starting 38th, he finished 33rd when he retired from the race on lap 335.

In 2019, Finchum surprisingly qualified second for both the Rinnai 250 and the Boyd Gaming 300 after rain canceled qualifying and the field was set by owner points from the 2018 season (due to those races only being the second and third of the new season), which MBM had bought from Chip Ganassi Racing's former Xfinity Series team. They also switched to Ganassi's old number, the No. 42, that year. That season he ran nearly full-time, only missing Daytona, which was run by John Jackson.

Finchum failed to qualify for the 2020 Daytona 500 after finishing twentieth in Duel 1 of the 2020 Bluegreen Vacations Duels. In September, he ran the South Point 400 at Las Vegas Motor Speedway, finishing last when overheating ended his day after nineteen laps. He also competed at Kansas and Texas, where he respectively finished 39th and 35th.

Finchum was due to return to the Daytona 500 the following year in the No. 13 for MBM (previously the No. 49), but was replaced by Garrett Smithley. He made a start with the team at Nashville Superspeedway with the No. 66, where he finished in 33rd.

On August 28, 2023, it was revealed through the entry list for the race at Darlington in September that Finchum would drive the No. 08 car for SS-Green Light Racing in that race, marking the first time he would drive for a team other than MBM Motorsports in the Xfinity Series and in NASCAR's top three series.

Finchum returned to MBM to drive their No. 66 car part-time in the Xfinity Series in 2024. He also made a start for Joey Gase Motorsports in the throwback weekend race at Darlington in May, running the paint scheme from Kevin Harvick's first Cup Series win in 2001 at Atlanta, the same one Harvick himself ran the previous year in the North Wilkesboro All-Star Race with his old No. 29.

On December 21, 2024, it was announced on a Facebook post from MBM that Finchum would drive for the team in 2025, beginning at Texas.

On April 26, 2026, Finchum led laps in the NASCAR Cup Series for the first time in his career at Talladega, leading 8 laps after surging to the front from 38th. He would also score his best career Cup Series finish of twenty-eighth in the race.

== Personal life ==
Finchum graduated from Halls High School in Halls Crossroads, Tennessee in 2009.

== Motorsports career results ==
=== NASCAR ===
(key) (Bold – Pole position awarded by qualifying time. Italics – Pole position earned by points standings or practice time. * – Most laps led.)

==== Cup Series ====
NASCAR Cup Series results
| Year | Team | No. | Make | 1 | 2 | 3 | 4 | 5 | 6 | 7 | 8 | 9 | 10 | 11 | 12 | 13 | 14 | 15 | 16 | 17 | 18 | 19 | 20 | 21 | 22 | 23 | 24 | 25 | 26 | 27 | 28 | 29 | 30 | 31 | 32 | 33 | 34 | 35 | 36 | NCSC | Pts | Ref |
|---|---|---|---|---|---|---|---|---|---|---|---|---|---|---|---|---|---|---|---|---|---|---|---|---|---|---|---|---|---|---|---|---|---|---|---|---|---|---|---|---|---|---|
| 2018 | MBM Motorsports | 66 | Toyota | DAY | ATL | LVS | PHO | CAL | MAR | TEX | BRI; 33 | RCH | TAL | DOV | KAN | CLT | POC | MCH | SON | CHI | DAY | KEN | NHA | POC | GLN | MCH | BRI | DAR | IND | LVS | RCH | ROV | DOV | TAL | KAN | MAR | TEX | PHO | HOM | 68th | 0^{1} | |
| 2020 | MBM Motorsports | 49 | Toyota | DAY; DNQ | LVS | CAL | PHO | DAR | DAR | CLT | CLT | BRI | ATL | MAR | HOM | TAL | POC | POC | IND | KEN | TEX | KAN | NHA | MCH | MCH | DRC | DOV | DOV | DAY | DAR | RCH | BRI | LVS; 39 | TAL | ROV | KAN; 39 | TEX; 35 | MAR | PHO | 52nd | 0^{1} | |
| 2021 | MBM Motorsports | 66 | Toyota | DAY | DRC | HOM | LVS | PHO | ATL | BRD | MAR | RCH | TAL | KAN | DAR | DOV | COA | CLT | SON | NSH; 33 | POC | POC | ROA | ATL | NHA | GLN | IRC | MCH | DAY | DAR | RCH | BRI | LVS | TAL | ROV | TEX | KAN; 40 | MAR | PHO | 65th | 0^{1} | |
| 2024 | MBM Motorsports | 66 | Ford | DAY | ATL | LVS | PHO | BRI | COA | RCH | MAR | TEX | TAL | DOV | KAN | DAR | CLT | GTW | SON | IOW | NHA | NSH; 38 | CSC | POC | IND | RCH | MCH | DAY | DAR | ATL | GLN | BRI | KAN | TAL | ROV | LVS | HOM; 37 | MAR | PHO; 36 | 60th | 0^{1} | |
| 2025 | Garage 66 | 66 | Ford | DAY | ATL | COA | PHO | LVS | HOM | MAR | DAR | BRI | TAL | TEX; 37 | KAN | CLT | NSH; 35 | MCH | MXC | POC | ATL | CSC | SON | DOV | IND | IOW | GLN | RCH | DAY | DAR | GTW | BRI; 35 | NHA | KAN | ROV | LVS | TAL | MAR | PHO | 40th | 5 | |
| 2026 | Garage 66 | 66 | Ford | DAY | ATL | COA | PHO | LVS | DAR | MAR | BRI; 36 | KAN | TAL; 28 | TEX; 33 | GLN | CLT | NSH; 28 | MCH | POC | COR | SON | CHI | ATL; 33 | NWS; 35 | IND | IOW | RCH | NHA | DAY | DAR; 38 | GTW | BRI | KAN | LVS | CLT | PHO | TAL | MAR | HOM; 38 | 52nd | 0^{1} | |

===== Daytona 500 =====
| Year | Team | Manufacturer | Start | Finish |
|---|---|---|---|---|
| 2020 | MBM Motorsports | Toyota | DNQ | |

==== O'Reilly Auto Parts Series ====
NASCAR O'Reilly Auto Parts Series results
| Year | Team | No. | Make | 1 | 2 | 3 | 4 | 5 | 6 | 7 | 8 | 9 | 10 | 11 | 12 | 13 | 14 | 15 | 16 | 17 | 18 | 19 | 20 | 21 | 22 | 23 | 24 | 25 | 26 | 27 | 28 | 29 | 30 | 31 | 32 | 33 | NOAPSC | Pts | Ref |
|---|---|---|---|---|---|---|---|---|---|---|---|---|---|---|---|---|---|---|---|---|---|---|---|---|---|---|---|---|---|---|---|---|---|---|---|---|---|---|---|
| 2017 | MBM Motorsports | 40 | Chevy | DAY | ATL | LVS | PHO | CAL | TEX | BRI | RCH | TAL | CLT | DOV; 34 | POC | MCH | IOW | DAY | KEN; 29 | NHA | | | | | BRI; 28 | ROA | DAR | RCH | CHI | KEN | DOV; 36 | | | | | | 49th | 41 | |
| 2017 | MBM Motorsports | 40 | Dodge | | | | | | | | | | | | | | | | | | IND; 32 | IOW | GLN | MOH | | | | | | | | | | | | | 49th | 41 | |
| 2017 | MBM Motorsports | 40 | Toyota | | | | | | | | | | | | | | | | | | | | | | | | | | | | | CLT; 29 | KAN | TEX | PHO | HOM; 30 | 49th | 41 | |
| 2018 | MBM Motorsports | 40 | Toyota | DAY; 28 | ATL; 35 | LVS; 32 | PHO; 36 | CAL; 36 | TEX; 34 | BRI; 36 | RCH; 34 | TAL; 39 | DOV; 25 | CLT; DNQ | POC; 30 | MCH; 29 | IOW; 26 | CHI; 38 | DAY; 14 | KEN; 31 | NHA; 21 | IOW; 37 | GLN; 29 | MOH; 29 | BRI; 30 | ROA; 22 | | IND; 21 | LVS; 25 | RCH; 26 | | DOV; 34 | KAN; 16 | TEX; 17 | PHO; 37 | | 30th | 253 | |
| 2018 | MBM Motorsports | 40 | Chevy | | | | | | | | | | | | | | | | | | | | | | | | DAR; 32 | | | | | | | | | | 30th | 253 | |
| 2018 | MBM Motorsports | 40 | Dodge | | | | | | | | | | | | | | | | | | | | | | | | | | | | ROV; 28 | | | | | | 30th | 253 | |
| 2018 | MBM Motorsports | 66 | Toyota | | | | | | | | | | | | | | | | | | | | | | | | | | | | | | | | | HOM; 31 | 30th | 253 | |
| 2019 | MBM Motorsports | 42 | Toyota | DAY | ATL; 26 | LVS; 21 | PHO; 19 | CAL; 32 | TEX; 23 | BRI; 20 | RCH; 34 | | DOV; 30 | CLT; 38 | POC; 37 | MCH; 22 | IOW; 21 | CHI; 24 | DAY; 27 | KEN; 28 | NHA; 30 | IOW; 32 | | | | | | | | | | | | | | | 26th | 250 | |
| 2019 | MBM Motorsports | 13 | Toyota | | | | | | | | | TAL; 36 | | | | | | | | | | | GLN; 32 | MOH; 35 | | ROA; 35 | | IND; 33 | | | ROV; 36 | | | | PHO; 32 | | 26th | 250 | |
| 2019 | MBM Motorsports | 66 | Toyota | | | | | | | | | | | | | | | | | | | | | | BRI; DNQ | | | | LVS; 34 | | | | | | | | 26th | 250 | |
| 2019 | MBM Motorsports | 61 | Toyota | | | | | | | | | | | | | | | | | | | | | | | | DAR; 30 | | | RCH; 26 | | DOV; 31 | KAN; 26 | TEX; 15 | | HOM; 35 | 26th | 250 | |
| 2020 | MBM Motorsports | 13 | Toyota | DAY; 20 | LVS; 21 | CAL; 20 | PHO; 24 | DAR; 24 | CLT; 22 | BRI; 24 | ATL; 34 | HOM; 30 | HOM; 21 | TAL; 22 | POC; 26 | | KEN; 16 | KEN; 33 | TEX; 24 | KAN; 29 | | | DOV; 29 | DOV; 24 | DAY; 25 | DAR; 20 | | | | | TAL; 11 | ROV | KAN | | | | 26th | 322 | |
| 2020 | MBM Motorsports | 66 | Toyota | | | | | | | | | | | | | IRC; 27 | | | | | ROA; 36 | DRC | | | | | | | | LVS; 35 | | | | TEX; 34 | | | 26th | 322 | |
| 2020 | MBM Motorsports | 61 | Toyota | | | | | | | | | | | | | | | | | | | | | | | | RCH; 37 | RCH; 28 | BRI; 20 | | | | | | MAR; 37 | PHO | 26th | 322 | |
| 2021 | MBM Motorsports | 13 | Ford | DAY; 30 | DRC | | | | | | | | | | | | | | | | | | | | | | | | | | | | | | | | 48th | 57 | |
| 2021 | MBM Motorsports | 61 | Toyota | | | HOM; 23 | LVS; 28 | PHO | | | | | | | | | | | | | | | | | | | | | BRI; 33 | LVS | TAL | ROV | TEX | KAN | MAR | PHO | 48th | 57 | |
| 2021 | MBM Motorsports | 13 | Toyota | | | | | | ATL; 39 | MAR | TAL | DAR | DOV | COA | CLT; 15 | MOH | TEX | | | | | NHA; DNQ | GLN | IRC | MCH | DAY | DAR; DNQ | RCH | | | | | | | | | 48th | 57 | |
| 2021 | MBM Motorsports | 42 | Toyota | | | | | | | | | | | | | | | NSH; DNQ | POC | ROA | ATL | | | | | | | | | | | | | | | | 48th | 57 | |
| 2022 | MBM Motorsports | 13 | Toyota | DAY | CAL | LVS | PHO | ATL; DNQ | COA | RCH | MAR; DNQ | TAL | DOV; 32 | DAR | TEX | CLT | PIR | NSH | ROA | ATL | NHA | POC | IRC | MCH | GLN | DAY | | | BRI; DNQ | TEX | TAL | ROV | LVS | HOM | MAR; 36 | PHO | 70th | 6 | |
| 2022 | MBM Motorsports | 13 | Ford | | | | | | | | | | | | | | | | | | | | | | | | DAR; DNQ | KAN | | | | | | | | | 70th | 6 | |
| 2023 | MBM Motorsports | 66 | Ford | DAY | CAL | LVS | PHO | ATL | COA | RCH | MAR; DNQ | TAL | DOV | DAR; DNQ | CLT | POR | SON | NSH; DNQ | CSC | ATL | NHA; 35 | POC | ROA | MCH | IRC | GLN | DAY | | | | | | | | | | 52nd | 35 | |
| 2023 | SS-Green Light Racing | 08 | Ford | | | | | | | | | | | | | | | | | | | | | | | | | DAR; 22 | KAN | BRI; 29 | TEX | ROV | LVS | HOM | MAR; 27 | PHO | 52nd | 35 | |
| 2024 | MBM Motorsports | 66 | Ford | DAY | ATL | LVS | PHO | COA | RCH | MAR | TEX; 38 | TAL | DOV; DNQ | | | | | | | | | | | | | | | | | | | | | | | | 57th | 27 | |
| 2024 | Joey Gase Motorsports | 35 | Chevy | | | | | | | | | | | DAR; 26 | CLT | PIR | SON | IOW | NHA | | | | | | | | | | | | | | | | | | 57th | 27 | |
| 2024 | SS-Green Light Racing | 14 | Ford | | | | | | | | | | | | | | | | | NSH; 34 | CSC | POC | IND | MCH | DAY | DAR; 33 | ATL | GLN | BRI; 32 | KAN | TAL | ROV | LVS | HOM | MAR | PHO | 57th | 27 | |
| 2026 | Joey Gase Motorsports with Scott Osteen | 55 | Chevy | DAY | ATL; 17 | COA | PHO | | | | | | | | | | | | | | | | | | | | | | | | | | | | | | 82nd | 0^{1} | |
| 2026 | Joey Gase Motorsports with Scott Osteen | 35 | Chevy | | | | | LVS; DNQ | DAR | MAR | CAR | BRI | KAN | TAL | TEX | GLN | DOV | CLT | NSH | POC | COR | SON | CHI | ATL | IND | IOW | DAY | DAR | GTW | BRI | LVS | CLT | PHO | TAL | MAR | HOM | 82nd | 0^{1} | |

^{*} Season still in progress
^{1} Ineligible for series points

==== K&N Pro Series East ====
NASCAR K&N Pro Series East results
| Year | Team | No. | Make | 1 | 2 | 3 | 4 | 5 | 6 | 7 | 8 | 9 | 10 | 11 | 12 | 13 | 14 | NKNPSEC | Pts | Ref |
|---|---|---|---|---|---|---|---|---|---|---|---|---|---|---|---|---|---|---|---|---|
| 2011 | Lori Williams | 12 | Dodge | GRE; 18 | SBO | RCH | IOW | BGS; 7 | JFC; 7 | LGY | NHA | COL | GRE; 26 | NHA | DOV | | | 31st | 486 | |
| 2012 | Spraker Racing | 37 | Toyota | BRI; 7 | GRE; 12 | RCH; 36 | IOW | BGS | JFC; 25 | LGY | CNB | COL | IOW | NHA | DOV | GRE | CAR | 32nd | 96 | |
| 2013 | Spraker Racing | 37 | Chevy | BRI; 34 | GRE | FIF | RCH | BGS | IOW | LGY | COL | IOW | VIR | GRE | NHA | DOV | RAL | 76th | 10 | |
| 2015 | James Finchum | 17 | Toyota | NSM | GRE | BRI; 17 | IOW | BGS | LGY | COL | NHA | | | | | | | 34th | 74 | |
| 2015 | Martin-McClure Racing | 39 | Chevy | | | | | | | | | IOW; 18 | GLN | MOT | VIR | RCH | DOV; 23 | 34th | 74 | |
| 2016 | Martin-McClure Racing | 39 | Toyota | NSM | MOB | GRE | BRI; 1* | VIR | DOM | STA | COL | NHA; 14 | | | | | DOV; 14 | 24th | 135 | |
| 2016 | Martin-McClure Racing | 33 | Toyota | | | | | | | | | | IOW; 17 | GLN | GRE | NJM | | 24th | 135 | |
| 2017 | Martin-McClure Racing | 39 | Toyota | NSM | GRE | BRI; 5 | SBO | SBO | MEM | BLN | TMP | NHA | IOW | GLN | LGY | NJM | DOV | 44th | 39 | |
