= 2019 Rinnai 250 =

Race details
- Race 2 of 33 in the 2019 NASCAR Xfinity Series season
- Date: February 23, 2019
- Location: Atlanta Motor Speedway in Hampton, Georgia
- Course: Permanent racing facility
- Course length: 1.54 miles (2.48 km)
- Distance: 163 laps, 251 mi (403 km)

Pole position
| Driver | Cole Custer | Stewart-Haas Racing with Biagi-DenBeste Racing |
- Time: N/A

Most laps led
| Driver | Christopher Bell | Joe Gibbs Racing |
- Laps: 142

Winner
| No. 20 | Christopher Bell | Joe Gibbs Racing |

Television in the United States
- Network: FS1

Radio in the United States
- Radio: MRN

The 2019 Rinnai 250 was a NASCAR Xfinity Series race held on February 23, 2019, at Atlanta Motor Speedway in Hampton, Georgia. Contested over 163 laps on the 1.54-mile-long (2.48 km) asphalt quad-oval intermediate speedway, it was the second race of the 2019 NASCAR Xfinity Series season.

== Entry list ==
| No. | Driver | Team | Manufacturer |
|---|---|---|---|
| 00 | Cole Custer | Stewart-Haas Racing with Biagi-DenBeste Racing | Ford |
| 0 | Garrett Smithley | JD Motorsports | Chevrolet |
| 01 | Stephen Leicht | JD Motorsports | Chevrolet |
| 1 | Michael Annett | JR Motorsports | Chevrolet |
| 2 | Tyler Reddick | Richard Childress Racing | Chevrolet |
| 4 | Ross Chastain | JD Motorsports | Chevrolet |
| 5 | Matt Mills (R) | B. J. McLeod Motorsports | Chevrolet |
| 07 | Ray Black Jr. | SS-Green Light Racing | Chevrolet |
| 7 | Justin Allgaier | JR Motorsports | Chevrolet |
| 08 | Gray Gaulding (R) | SS-Green Light Racing | Chevrolet |
| 8 | Ryan Preece (i) | JR Motorsports | Chevrolet |
| 9 | Noah Gragson (R) | JR Motorsports | Chevrolet |
| 11 | Justin Haley (R) | Kaulig Racing | Chevrolet |
| 13 | John Jackson | MBM Motorsports | Toyota |
| 15 | B. J. McLeod | JD Motorsports | Chevrolet |
| 17 | Bayley Currey (i) | Rick Ware Racing | Chevrolet |
| 18 | Jeffrey Earnhardt | Joe Gibbs Racing | Toyota |
| 19 | Brandon Jones | Joe Gibbs Racing | Toyota |
| 20 | Christopher Bell | Joe Gibbs Racing | Toyota |
| 22 | Austin Cindric | Team Penske | Ford |
| 23 | John Hunter Nemechek (R) | GMS Racing | Chevrolet |
| 35 | Joey Gase | MBM Motorsports | Toyota |
| 36 | Josh Williams | DGM Racing | Chevrolet |
| 38 | Josh Bilicki | RSS Racing | Chevrolet |
| 39 | Ryan Sieg | RSS Racing | Chevrolet |
| 42 | Chad Finchum | MBM Motorsports | Toyota |
| 51 | Jeremy Clements | Jeremy Clements Racing | Chevrolet |
| 52 | David Starr | Jimmy Means Racing | Chevrolet |
| 66 | Timmy Hill | MBM Motorsports | Toyota |
| 74 | Mike Harmon | Mike Harmon Racing | Chevrolet |
| 78 | Vinnie Miller | B. J. McLeod Motorsports | Chevrolet |
| 86 | Brandon Brown (R) | Brandonbilt Motorsports | Chevrolet |
| 89 | Morgan Shepherd | Shepherd Racing Ventures | Chevrolet |
| 90 | Alex Labbé | DGM Racing | Chevrolet |
| 93 | Jeff Green | RSS Racing | Chevrolet |
| 98 | Chase Briscoe (R) | Stewart-Haas Racing with Biagi-DenBeste Racing | Ford |
| 99 | Tommy Joe Martins | B. J. McLeod Motorsports | Toyota |

== Practice ==
=== First practice ===
Cole Custer was the fastest in the first practice session with a time of 31.108 seconds and a speed of 178.218 mph (286.814 km/h).

| Pos | No. | Driver | Team | Manufacturer | Time | Speed |
|---|---|---|---|---|---|---|
| 1 | 00 | Cole Custer | Stewart-Haas Racing with Biagi-DenBeste Racing | Ford | 31.108 | 178.218 |
| 2 | 20 | Christopher Bell | Joe Gibbs Racing | Toyota | 31.324 | 176.989 |
| 3 | 11 | Justin Haley (R) | Kaulig Racing | Chevrolet | 31.401 | 176.555 |

=== Final practice ===
Justin Haley was the fastest in the final practice session with a time of 31.184 seconds and a speed of 177.783 mph (286.114 km/h).

| Pos | No. | Driver | Team | Manufacturer | Time | Speed |
|---|---|---|---|---|---|---|
| 1 | 11 | Justin Haley (R) | Kaulig Racing | Chevrolet | 31.184 | 177.783 |
| 2 | 9 | Noah Gragson (R) | JR Motorsports | Chevrolet | 31.219 | 177.584 |
| 3 | 00 | Cole Custer | Stewart-Haas Racing with Biagi-DenBeste Racing | Ford | 31.420 | 176.448 |

== Qualifying ==
Qualifying was canceled due to rain. The starting lineup was determined by 2018 owner's points, meaning Cole Custer was awarded the pole for the race.

=== Qualifying results ===
| Pos | No | Driver | Team | Manufacturer | Time |
|---|---|---|---|---|---|
| 1 | 00 | Cole Custer | Stewart-Haas Racing with Biagi-DenBeste Racing | Ford | 0.000 |
| 2 | 42 | Chad Finchum | MBM Motorsports | Toyota | 0.000 |
| 3 | 20 | Christopher Bell | Joe Gibbs Racing | Toyota | 0.000 |
| 4 | 9 | Noah Gragson (R) | JR Motorsports | Chevrolet | 0.000 |
| 5 | 22 | Austin Cindric | Team Penske | Ford | 0.000 |
| 6 | 8 | Ryan Preece (i) | JR Motorsports | Chevrolet | 0.000 |
| 7 | 7 | Justin Allgaier | JR Motorsports | Chevrolet | 0.000 |
| 8 | 18 | Jeffrey Earnhardt | Joe Gibbs Racing | Toyota | 0.000 |
| 9 | 19 | Brandon Jones | Joe Gibbs Racing | Toyota | 0.000 |
| 10 | 23 | John Hunter Nemechek (R) | GMS Racing | Chevrolet | 0.000 |
| 11 | 86 | Brandon Brown (R) | Brandonbilt Motorsports | Chevrolet | 0.000 |
| 12 | 2 | Tyler Reddick | Richard Childress Racing | Chevrolet | 0.000 |
| 13 | 11 | Justin Haley (R) | Kaulig Racing | Chevrolet | 0.000 |
| 14 | 78 | Vinnie Miller | B. J. McLeod Motorsports | Chevrolet | 0.000 |
| 15 | 4 | Ross Chastain | JD Motorsports | Chevrolet | 0.000 |
| 16 | 1 | Michael Annett | JR Motorsports | Chevrolet | 0.000 |
| 17 | 51 | Jeremy Clements | Jeremy Clements Racing | Chevrolet | 0.000 |
| 18 | 39 | Ryan Sieg | RSS Racing | Chevrolet | 0.000 |
| 19 | 36 | Josh Williams | DGM Racing | Chevrolet | 0.000 |
| 20 | 07 | Ray Black Jr. | SS-Green Light Racing | Chevrolet | 0.000 |
| 21 | 17 | Bayley Currey (i) | Rick Ware Racing | Chevrolet | 0.000 |
| 22 | 0 | Garrett Smithley | JD Motorsports | Chevrolet | 0.000 |
| 23 | 90 | Alex Labbé | DGM Racing | Chevrolet | 0.000 |
| 24 | 99 | Tommy Joe Martins | B. J. McLeod Motorsports | Toyota | 0.000 |
| 25 | 5 | Matt Mills (R) | B. J. McLeod Motorsports | Chevrolet | 0.000 |
| 26 | 38 | Josh Bilicki | RSS Racing | Chevrolet | 0.000 |
| 27 | 52 | David Starr | Jimmy Means Racing | Chevrolet | 0.000 |
| 28 | 98 | Chase Briscoe (R) | Stewart-Haas Racing with Biagi-DenBeste Racing | Ford | 0.000 |
| 29 | 15 | B. J. McLeod | JD Motorsports | Chevrolet | 0.000 |
| 30 | 01 | Stephen Leicht | JD Motorsports | Chevrolet | 0.000 |
| 31 | 93 | Jeff Green | RSS Racing | Chevrolet | 0.000 |
| 32 | 35 | Joey Gase | MBM Motorsports | Toyota | 0.000 |
| 33 | 66 | Timmy Hill | MBM Motorsports | Toyota | 0.000 |
| 34 | 13 | John Jackson | MBM Motorsports | Toyota | 0.000 |
| 35 | 08 | Gray Gaulding (R) | SS-Green Light Racing | Chevrolet | 0.000 |
| 36 | 74 | Mike Harmon | Mike Harmon Racing | Chevrolet | 0.000 |
| 37 | 89 | Morgan Shepherd | Shepherd Racing Ventures | Chevrolet | 0.000 |

== Race ==
=== Stage Results ===
Stage One Laps: 40

| Pos | No | Driver | Team | Manufacturer | Points |
|---|---|---|---|---|---|
| 1 | 20 | Christopher Bell | Joe Gibbs Racing | Toyota | 10 |
| 2 | 00 | Cole Custer | Stewart-Haas Racing with Biagi-DenBeste | Ford | 9 |
| 3 | 7 | Justin Allgaier | JR Motorsports | Chevrolet | 8 |
| 4 | 2 | Tyler Reddick | Richard Childress Racing | Chevrolet | 7 |
| 5 | 19 | Brandon Jones | Joe Gibbs Racing | Toyota | 6 |
| 6 | 23 | John Hunter Nemechek (R) | GMS Racing | Chevrolet | 5 |
| 7 | 18 | Jeffrey Earnhardt | Joe Gibbs Racing | Toyota | 4 |
| 8 | 22 | Austin Cindric | Team Penske | Ford | 3 |
| 9 | 8 | Ryan Preece (i) | JR Motorsports | Chevrolet | 0 |
| 10 | 98 | Chase Briscoe (R) | Stewart-Haas Racing with Biagi-DenBeste | Ford | 1 |

Stage Two Laps: 40

| Pos | No | Driver | Team | Manufacturer | Points |
|---|---|---|---|---|---|
| 1 | 20 | Christopher Bell | Joe Gibbs Racing | Toyota | 10 |
| 2 | 00 | Cole Custer | Stewart-Haas Racing with Biagi-DenBeste | Ford | 9 |
| 3 | 2 | Tyler Reddick | Richard Childress Racing | Chevrolet | 8 |
| 4 | 19 | Brandon Jones | Joe Gibbs Racing | Toyota | 7 |
| 5 | 18 | Jeffrey Earnhardt | Joe Gibbs Racing | Toyota | 6 |
| 6 | 22 | Austin Cindric | Team Penske | Ford | 5 |
| 7 | 1 | Michael Annett | JR Motorsports | Chevrolet | 4 |
| 8 | 98 | Chase Briscoe (R) | Stewart-Haas Racing with Biagi-DenBeste | Ford | 3 |
| 9 | 8 | Ryan Preece (i) | JR Motorsports | Chevrolet | 0 |
| 10 | 23 | John Hunter Nemechek (R) | GMS Racing | Chevrolet | 1 |

=== Final Stage Results ===
Stage Three Laps: 83

| Pos | Grid | No | Driver | Team | Manufacturer | Laps | Points |
|---|---|---|---|---|---|---|---|
| 1 | 3 | 20 | Christopher Bell | Joe Gibbs Racing | Toyota | 163 | 60 |
| 2 | 1 | 00 | Cole Custer | Stewart-Haas Racing with Biagi-DenBeste | Ford | 163 | 53 |
| 3 | 7 | 7 | Justin Allgaier | JR Motorsports | Chevrolet | 163 | 42 |
| 4 | 9 | 19 | Brandon Jones | Joe Gibbs Racing | Toyota | 163 | 46 |
| 5 | 12 | 2 | Tyler Reddick | Richard Childress Racing | Chevrolet | 163 | 47 |
| 6 | 8 | 18 | Jeffrey Earnhardt | Joe Gibbs Racing | Toyota | 163 | 41 |
| 7 | 6 | 8 | Ryan Preece (i) | JR Motorsports | Chevrolet | 163 | 0 |
| 8 | 13 | 11 | Justin Haley (R) | Kaulig Racing | Chevrolet | 163 | 29 |
| 9 | 4 | 9 | Noah Gragson (R) | JR Motorsports | Chevrolet | 163 | 28 |
| 10 | 5 | 22 | Austin Cindric | Team Penske | Ford | 163 | 35 |
| 11 | 18 | 39 | Ryan Sieg | RSS Racing | Chevrolet | 163 | 26 |
| 12 | 16 | 1 | Michael Annett | JR Motorsports | Chevrolet | 163 | 29 |
| 13 | 11 | 86 | Brandon Brown (R) | Brandonbilt Motorsports | Chevrolet | 163 | 24 |
| 14 | 15 | 4 | Ross Chastain | JD Motorsports | Chevrolet | 163 | 23 |
| 15 | 28 | 98 | Chase Briscoe (R) | Stewart-Haas Racing with Biagi-DenBeste | Ford | 162 | 26 |
| 16 | 35 | 08 | Gray Gaulding | SS-Green Light Racing | Chevrolet | 162 | 21 |
| 17 | 22 | 0 | Garrett Smithley | JD Motorsports | Chevrolet | 162 | 20 |
| 18 | 17 | 51 | Jeremy Clements | Jeremy Clements Racing | Chevrolet | 162 | 19 |
| 19 | 23 | 90 | Alex Labbé | DGM Racing | Chevrolet | 162 | 18 |
| 20 | 10 | 23 | John Hunter Nemechek (R) | GMS Racing | Chevrolet | 162 | 23 |
| 21 | 19 | 36 | Josh Williams | DGM Racing | Chevrolet | 161 | 16 |
| 22 | 21 | 17 | Bayley Currey (i) | Rick Ware Racing | Chevrolet | 159 | 0 |
| 23 | 20 | 07 | Ray Black Jr. | SS-Green Light Racing | Chevrolet | 159 | 14 |
| 24 | 29 | 15 | B. J. McLeod | JD Motorsports | Chevrolet | 159 | 13 |
| 25 | 30 | 01 | Stephen Leicht | JD Motorsports | Chevrolet | 159 | 12 |
| 26 | 2 | 42 | Chad Finchum | MBM Motorsports | Toyota | 158 | 11 |
| 27 | 27 | 52 | David Starr | Jimmy Means Racing | Chevrolet | 158 | 10 |
| 28 | 33 | 66 | Timmy Hill | MBM Motorsports | Toyota | 157 | 9 |
| 29 | 32 | 35 | Joey Gase | MBM Motorsports | Toyota | 156 | 8 |
| 30 | 25 | 5 | Matt Mills (R) | B. J. McLeod Motorsports | Chevrolet | 154 | 7 |
| 31 | 24 | 99 | Tommy Joe Martins | B. J. McLeod Motorsports | Toyota | 152 | 6 |
| 32 | 14 | 78 | Vinnie Miller | B. J. McLeod Motorsports | Chevrolet | 94 | 5 |
| 33 | 36 | 74 | Mike Harmon | Mike Harmon Racing | Chevrolet | 90 | 4 |
| 34 | 26 | 38 | Josh Bilicki | RSS Racing | Chevrolet | 87 | 3 |
| 35 | 37 | 89 | Morgan Shepherd | Shepherd Racing Ventures | Chevrolet | 45 | 2 |
| 36 | 31 | 93 | Jeff Green | RSS Racing | Chevrolet | 42 | 1 |
| 37 | 34 | 13 | John Jackson | MBM Motorsports | Toyota | 14 | 1 |

| Previous race: 2019 NASCAR Racing Experience 300 | NASCAR Xfinity Series; 2019 season | Next race: 2019 Boyd Gaming 300 |
