= Valley Forge Military Academy and College =

Valley Forge Military Academy and College may refer to:

- Valley Forge Military Academy
- Valley Forge Military College
