= Shepherd Racing Ventures =

Auto racing team

- Owner: Morgan Shepherd
- Base: Conover, North Carolina
- Series: Xfinity Series
- Manufacturer: Chevrolet

Career
- Drivers' Championships: 0
- Race victories: 4
- Pole positions: 0

Shepherd Racing Ventures was an American professional stock car racing team that last competed in the NASCAR Xfinity Series. The team previously fielded the No. 89 Chevrolet Camaro.

== Beginnings ==
It began in 2001 in the Craftsman Truck Series as No. 6 with Morgan Shepherd as the owner/driver and Red Line Oil sponsoring, running under the moniker Victory in Jesus Racing.

== Sprint Cup Series ==
It moved up to Nextel Cup the next year, fielding the No. 89 Ford Taurus. It debuted at New Hampshire International Speedway and ran four more races that year, each ending in a DNF and Victory in Jesus taking over sponsorship. After 2002, the team ran a part-time schedule for Shepherd.

In 2006, Shepherd teamed up with businessmen Tony and Brian Mullet to rename the team as Victory Motorsports. The team attended seven of the first nine events, and also entered Kertus Davis for the Crown Royal 400 at Richmond, but failed to qualify in all eight attempts. On May 24, it was announced that Shepherd had sold the team to the Mullets, who renamed it as CJM Racing. Shepherd retained the Victory in Jesus Racing moniker and the use of the No. 89, racing in the NASCAR Nationwide Series for Davis Motorsports in the meantime.

On August 1, 2006, Shepherd announced the formation of Faith Motorsports along with businessman Dana Tomes, racing a limited schedule with plans for a full 2007 campaign. Shepherd was entered for seven races, and managed to qualify at Richmond and New Hampshire.

== Xfinity Series ==
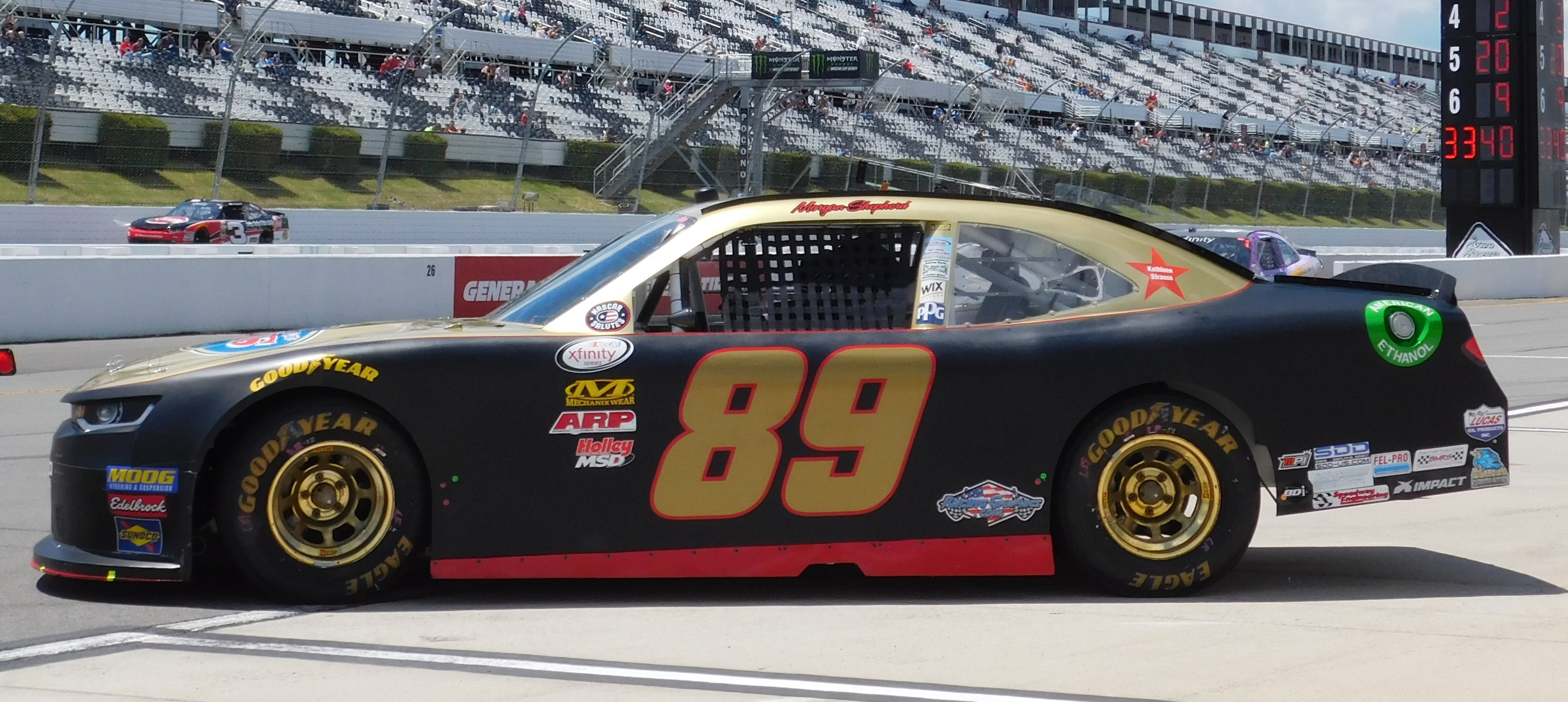
Morgan Shepherd in the No. 89 at Pocono Raceway in 2017

In 2007, SRV, still under its original name Faith Motorsports, stopped fielding cars in the Sprint Cup Series and moved back to the Nationwide Series and ran the majority of the races in the second half of the season.

For 2008, the team attempted the full schedule for the first time. The season was highlighted by Shepherd's 13th place finish at Talladega Superspeedway. Other good runs were scattered throughout the year.

In 2009, the team switched to Chevrolet. After a slew of DNQs, the team was forced to start and park several races. It was an up and down year for the team.

In 2010, Faith Motorsports started the year with high hopes and came back to finish 22nd in the season opener in Daytona after an early race issue with the car. A special "Fans For Faith" donation fund was formed, and any fan could donate $100.00 to have their name put on the car. About mid-season, Faith Motorsports allied with Richard Childress Racing (RCR). Shepherd split his time between the 89 car and RCR's 21. Johnny Chapman and Brett Rowe took the reins of the 89, and mostly start and parked while Shepherd was in the 21. The alliance with RCR allowed Shepherd to use the 21 car's owner points to guarantee that the 89 would make the first five races of 2011.

For 2011, the team returned full-time with the 89 driven by Shepherd. A second car was formed, the 55 driven by Brett Rowe. This car is mainly used to start and park, which helps fund the primary 89. After DNQs in Daytona and Texas, the 55 decided to skip Talladega. In 2013 the team ran Dodges at the restrictor plate tracks (Daytona and Talladega). The team also ran as many races as possible, using Chevrolet. In 2014, Shepherd qualified for the Nationwide race at Dover, but failed to qualify for the races at Kentucky Speedway and New Hampshire Motor Speedway.

2015 saw Shepherd enter Daytona, but withdrew midweek. Shepherd qualified for Atlanta and Las Vegas, but DNQ'd for Phoenix. Shepherd later qualified for Bristol, finishing 38th. Shepherd's team attempted 20 races but didn't run any races to completion. In 2016, SRV partnered with CM2, a company that helps teams find funding so that Shepherd can run races to the finish. Shepherd celebrated his 50th year of racing in 2017. In 2018, Landon Cassill ran the season-ending race at Homestead-Miami Speedway.

Cassill ran ten races for Shepherd Racing Ventures in 2019, though he failed to finish all but one. At the Rhino Pro Truck Outfitters 300 in Las Vegas, Cassill qualified ninth for the team's first top-ten starting position since Shepherd qualified tenth at Daytona in 2009. In Homestead, the team acquired sufficient sponsorship to run the full Ford EcoBoost 300. After qualifying 13th, Cassill finished 15th for the team's first completed race since Dover in 2013 and their first top-15 run since Las Vegas in 2009. SVR planned on attempting the majority of the 2020 NASCAR Xfinity Series schedule with Landon Cassill behind the wheel. Following NASCAR's return in May 2020, the 89 returned for only one race, the series return at Darlington. Team owner Morgan Shepherd said that despite the field expansion from 36 cars to 40, lack of qualifying wasn't going to allow the team to show off for potential sponsors, and the purse for positions 37-40 was only $5,000, much less than the team's expenses.

Shepherd hoped to run the team in 2021, despite his Parkinson's diagnosis. Cassill would depart for JD Motorsports, and the lack of a superspeedway car prevented the 89 from attempting Daytona. Shepherd later said that the 89 wouldn't return until the team had sufficient sponsorship and qualifying would return on a regular basis.

== Motorsports career results ==
=== NASCAR ===
(key) (Bold – Pole position awarded by qualifying time. Italics – Pole position earned by points standings or practice time. * – Most laps led.)

==== Nextel Cup Series ====
NASCAR Nextel Cup Series results
Year	Driver	No.	Make	1	2	3	4	5	6	7	8	9	10	11	12	13	14	15	16	17	18	19	20	21	22	23	24	25	26	27	28	29	30	31	32	33	34	35	36	Owners	Pts
1985	Morgan Shepherd	38	Chevy	DAY	RCH	CAR	ATL	BRI	DAR	NWS	MAR	TAL; 13	DOV	CLT	RSD	POC	MCH	DAY	POC	TAL	MCH	BRI	DAR	RCH	DOV	MAR	NWS	CLT	CAR	ATL	RSD									(Note: unknown)	
1988	Morgan Shepherd	47	Buick	DAY	RCH	CAR	ATL; 30	DAR; 39	BRI	NWS	MAR	TAL	CLT; 26	DOV	RSD	POC	MCH	DAY	POC	TAL	GLN	MCH																			
1988	Morgan Shepherd	57	Buick																				BRI; DNQ	DAR; 39	RCH; 31	DOV	MAR; 31	CLT; 16	NWS; 22	CAR; 14	PHO	ATL									
1998	Morgan Shepherd	05	Pontiac	DAY	CAR; DNQ	LVS	ATL; DNQ	DAR; DNQ	BRI	TEX	MAR	TAL	CAL	CLT	DOV	RCH	MCH	POC	SON	NHA	POC	IND	GLN	MCH	BRI	NHA	DAR	RCH	DOV	MAR	CLT	TAL	DAY	PHO	CAR	ATL				63rd	38
1999	Morgan Shepherd	05	Pontiac	DAY	CAR	LVS	ATL	DAR	TEX	BRI	MAR	TAL	CAL	RCH	CLT; DNQ	DOV	MCH	POC	SON	DAY	NHA	POC	IND; DNQ	GLN	MCH	BRI	DAR	RCH	NHA	DOV	MAR; DNQ	CLT	TAL	CAR	PHO	HOM	ATL; DNQ			60th	67
2001	Morgan Shepherd	89	Ford	DAY	CAR	LVS	ATL	DAR	BRI	TEX	MAR	TAL	CAL	RCH	CLT	DOV	MCH	POC	SON	DAY	CHI	NHA	POC	IND	GLN	MCH	BRI	DAR	RCH	DOV	KAN	CLT	MAR	TAL	PHO	CAR	HOM	ATL	NHA; DNQ	NA	-
2002	Morgan Shepherd	89	Ford	DAY	CAR	LVS	ATL	DAR	BRI	TEX	MAR; Wth	TAL	CAL	RCH	CLT	DOV	POC	MCH; Wth	SON	DAY	CHI	NHA; 40	POC; 42	IND; Wth	GLN	MCH; Wth	BRI; DNQ	DAR; 43	RCH; Wth	NHA; 41	DOV; Wth	KAN; 40	TAL; Wth	CLT; Wth	MAR; DNQ	ATL; Wth	CAR	PHO; DNQ	HOM	51st	271
2003	Morgan Shepherd	89	Ford	DAY	CAR	LVS	ATL	DAR	BRI	TEX	TAL	MAR	CAL	RCH	CLT	DOV	POC; DNQ	MCH	SON	DAY	CHI	NHA; 43	POC; 43	IND; Wth	GLN	MCH; Wth	BRI; DNQ	DAR	RCH	NHA; DNQ	DOV; DNQ	TAL; Wth	KAN	CLT	MAR; DNQ	ATL; Wth	PHO	CAR	HOM	54th	177
2004	Morgan Shepherd	89	Dodge	DAY	CAR; Wth	LVS; 42	ATL; DNQ	DAR; 38	BRI; DNQ	TEX; DNQ	MAR; 32	TAL; 41	CAL; 36	RCH; 39	CLT; DNQ	DOV; 42	POC; 38	MCH; 40	SON; DNQ	DAY; 33	CHI; Wth	NHA; 40	POC; 37	IND; DNQ	GLN; 38	MCH; 34	BRI; 41	CAL; DNQ	RCH; DNQ	NHA; 40	DOV; 34	TAL; Wth	KAN; DNQ	CLT; DNQ	MAR; DNQ	ATL; DNQ	PHO; 41	DAR; 43	HOM; DNQ	41st	1181
2005	Morgan Shepherd	89	Dodge	DAY; DNQ	CAL; Wth	LVS; 40	ATL; DNQ		MAR; Wth	TEX	PHO	TAL	DAR; DNQ	RCH; 42	CLT	DOV	POC; 42	MCH; DNQ	SON	DAY; Wth	CHI	NHA; 41	POC; DNQ	IND; DNQ	GLN; Wth	MCH; DNQ	BRI; DNQ	CAL	RCH; DNQ	NHA; DNQ	DOV; DNQ	TAL; DNQ	KAN	CLT	MAR; DNQ	ATL; DNQ	TEX	PHO; DNQ	HOM; DNQ	50th	501
2005	Jason Jarrett	89	Dodge					BRI; DNQ																																50th	501
2006	Morgan Shepherd	89	Dodge	DAY; DNQ	CAL; DNQ	LVS; DNQ	ATL; Wth	BRI; DNQ	MAR; DNQ	TEX	PHO; DNQ	TAL; DNQ										NHA; DNQ	POC	IND	GLN	MCH	BRI; DNQ	CAL	RCH; 43	NHA; 42	DOV; DNQ	KAN	TAL	CLT; DNQ	MAR; DNQ	ATL	TEX	PHO; DNQ	HOM; Wth	53rd	355
2006	Kertus Davis	89	Dodge										RCH; DNQ	DAR	CLT	DOV	POC	MCH	SON	DAY	CHI																			53rd	355

==== Xfinity Series (primary entry) ====
NASCAR Xfinity Series results
Year	Team	No.	Make	1	2	3	4	5	6	7	8	9	10	11	12	13	14	15	16	17	18	19	20	21	22	23	24	25	26	27	28	29	30	31	32	33	34	35	Owners	Pts
1986	Morgan Shepherd	17	Buick	DAY	CAR	HCY	MAR	BRI	DAR	SBO	LGY	JFC	DOV	CLT	SBO	HCY	ROU	IRP	SBO	RAL	OXF	SBO	HCY	LGY	ROU	BRI	DAR	RCH	DOV	MAR; 16	ROU	CLT	CAR	MAR						
1987	Ron Bouchard	97	Buick	DAY; 40	HCY	MAR																																		
1987	Morgan Shepherd	97	Buick				DAR; 10	BRI; 1	LGY	SBO	CLT; 9	DOV; 4	IRP	ROU	JFC	OXF	SBO	HCY	RAL; 1	LGY	ROU	BRI; 28	JFC	DAR; 2	RCH; 23	DOV; 20	MAR	CLT; 38	CAR; 1	MAR										
1988	Morgan Shepherd	97	Buick	DAY; 44	HCY; 24	CAR; 8	MAR	DAR; 32	BRI	LNG	NZH; 28	SBO	NSV	CLT; 8	DOV; 29	ROU	LAN	LVL	MYB; 30	OXF	SBO	HCY	LNG	IRP; 1	ROU	BRI	DAR; 5	RCH; 32	DOV; 3	MAR	CLT; 42									
1988	Morgan Shepherd	97	Chevy																													CAR; 16	MAR							
1989	Morgan Shepherd	97	Chevy	DAY; 15	CAR	MAR	HCY	DAR	BRI	NZH	SBO	LAN	NSV	CLT	DOV	ROU	LVL	VOL	MYB	SBO	HCY	DUB	IRP	ROU	BRI															
1989	Morgan Shepherd	97	Pontiac																							DAR; 38	RCH	DOV	MAR	CLT	CAR	MAR								
1990	Morgan Shepherd	97	Ford	DAY; 44	RCH	CAR	MAR	HCY	DAR	BRI	LAN	SBO	NZH	HCY	CLT	DOV	ROU	VOL	MYB	OXF	NHA	SBO	DUB	IRP	ROU	BRI	DAR	RCH	DOV	MAR	CLT; 36	NHA	CAR; 3	MAR						
1991	Morgan Shepherd	97	Ford	DAY; 7	RCH; 6	CAR; 29	MAR	VOL	HCY	DAR; 35	BRI; 31	LAN	SBO	NZH; 35	CLT; 30	DOV; 28	ROU	HCY	MYB	GLN; 26	OXF	NHA; 39	SBO	DUB	IRP; 32	ROU	BRI; 27	DAR; 35	RCH; 5	DOV	CLT; 41	NHA	CAR; 36	MAR						
1992	Morgan Shepherd	97	Ford	DAY; 43	CAR	RCH	ATL; 5	MAR	DAR; 28	BRI	HCY	LAN	DUB	NZH																										
1992	Morgan Shepherd	21	Ford												CLT; 3	DOV	ROU	MYB	GLN	VOL	NHA; 28	TAL	IRP; 6	ROU	MCH; 33	NHA; 43	BRI; 14	DAR; 7	RCH	DOV; Wth	CLT; 29	MAR	CAR	HCY						
1993	Dennis Setzer	21	Ford	DAY	CAR	RCH	DAR	BRI	HCY	ROU	MAR	NZH	CLT; 22	DOV	MYB	GLN	MLW	TAL	IRP																					
1993	Morgan Shepherd	21	Ford																	MCH; 25	NHA	BRI	DAR	RCH	DOV	ROU	CLT	MAR	CAR	HCY	ATL									
1994	Morgan Shepherd	21	Ford	DAY; 7	CAR; 13	RCH	ATL; DNQ	MAR	DAR; 19	HCY	BRI; 25	ROU	NHA	NZH	CLT; 39	DOV	MYB	GLN	MLW	SBO	TAL; 17	HCY	IRP	MCH	BRI	DAR; 19	RCH; 37	DOV	CLT; DNQ	MAR	CAR									
1995	Morgan Shepherd	21	Ford	DAY	CAR; 5	RCH; 37	ATL; 15	NSV	DAR; 36	BRI	HCY	NHA	NZH	CLT; 36	DOV	MYB	GLN	MLW	TAL	SBO	IRP	MCH; 11	BRI	DAR	RCH	DOV	CLT; 6	CAR; DNQ	HOM											
1997	Morgan Shepherd	07	Pontiac	DAY	CAR	RCH	ATL	LVS	DAR	HCY	TEX	BRI	NSV	TAL	NHA	NZH	CLT	DOV	SBO	GLN	MLW	MYB	GTY	IRP	MCH; 32	BRI	DAR	RCH	DOV											
1997	Morgan Shepherd	07	Chevy																											CLT; DNQ	CAL	CAR	HOM							
1998	Morgan Shepherd	07	Pontiac	DAY	CAR	LVS	NSV	DAR	BRI	TEX	HCY	TAL	NHA	NZH	CLT	DOV	RCH	PPR	GLN	MLW	MYB	CAL	SBO	IRP	MCH	BRI	DAR	RCH	DOV	CLT	GTY	CAR	ATL; DNQ	HOM; DNQ						
2004	Morgan Shepherd	89	Ford	DAY	CAR	LVS	DAR	BRI	TEX	NSH; DNQ	TAL	CAL	GTY	RCH	NZH	CLT	DOV	NSH	KEN	MLW	DAY	CHI	NHA	PPR	IRP	MCH	BRI	CAL	RCH	DOV	KAN									
2004	Morgan Shepherd	89	Dodge																													CLT; DNQ	MEM	ATL	PHO	DAR	HOM			
2007	Morgan Shepherd	89	Dodge	DAY	CAL	MXC	LVS	ATL	BRI	NSH	TEX	PHO	TAL	RCH	DAR	CLT	DOV; 38	NSH; 41	KEN; 42		NHA; 42	DAY	CHI; 42	GTY; 39	IRP; 40	CGV; 38	GLN; 39	MCH; 41	BRI; 43	CAL; 39	RCH; DNQ	DOV; 38	KAN; DNQ	CLT; 43	MEM; DNQ	TEX; 39	PHO; DNQ	HOM; 41	47th	833
2007	Brad Teague	89	Ford																	MLW; 39																			47th	833
2008	Morgan Shepherd	89	Dodge	DAY; DNQ	CAL; 37	LVS; 40	ATL; 41	BRI; 37	NSH; 38	TEX; 42	PHO; 34	MXC; DNQ	TAL; 13	RCH; 28	DAR; 16	CLT; 37	DOV; 22	NSH; 24	KEN; 43	MLW; 37	NHA; 25	DAY; 31	CHI; DNQ	GTY; 37	IRP; 37			MCH; 26	BRI; DNQ	CAL; 34	RCH; 36	DOV; 22	KAN; 24	CLT; DNQ	MEM; 37	TEX; DNQ	PHO; DNQ	HOM; DNQ	35th	2017
2008	Morgan Shepherd	89	Chevy																							CGV; 37	GLN; 24												35th	2017
2009	Morgan Shepherd	89	Chevy	DAY; 39	CAL; 19	LVS; 13	BRI; 34	TEX; 28	NSH; 31	PHO; 35	TAL; 23	RCH; 36	DAR; 31	CLT; DNQ	DOV; 22	NSH; 17	KEN; 25	MLW; DNQ	NHA; DNQ	DAY; 32	CHI; DNQ	GTY; DNQ	IRP; 17	IOW; 19	GLN; 21	MCH; DNQ	BRI; DNQ	CGV; DNQ	ATL; DNQ	RCH; DNQ	DOV; 21	KAN; DNQ	CAL; 33	CLT; DNQ	MEM; 34	TEX; 32	PHO; DNQ	HOM; DNQ	34th	2068
2010	Morgan Shepherd	89	Chevy	DAY; 22	CAL; DNQ	LVS; DNQ	BRI; 35	NSH; 40	PHO; 39	TEX; DNQ	TAL; 30	RCH; 36	DAR; DNQ	DOV; 37	CLT; 36	NSH; 35	KEN; 37	ROA; 19	NHA; 22	DAY; 40							BRI; DNQ			RCH; 41				CLT; DNQ		TEX; DNQ			38th	1521
2010	Johnny Chapman	89	Chevy																		CHI; 42	GTY; 40	IRP; 42	IOW; DNQ	GLN; 40	MCH; DNQ			ATL; 39		DOV; 40	KAN; DNQ	CAL; DNQ		GTY; 37				38th	1521
2010	Brett Rowe	89	Chevy																									CGV; 41									PHO; DNQ	HOM	38th	1521
2011	Morgan Shepherd	89	Chevy	DAY; 26	PHO; 33	LVS; 18	BRI; 31	CAL; 23	TEX; 37	TAL; 30	NSH; 28	RCH; 28	DAR; 22	DOV; 26	IOW; 20	CLT; 24	CHI; 25	MCH; 34	ROA; 35	DAY; 38	KEN; 34	NHA; 21	NSH; 32	IRP; 32	IOW; 32	GLN; 34	CGV; 42	BRI; 34	ATL; 25	RCH; 24	CHI; 28	DOV; 25	KAN; 27	CLT; 25	TEX; 28	PHO; 28	HOM; 43		30th	504
2012	Morgan Shepherd	89	Chevy	DAY; DNQ	PHO; 38	LVS; 22	BRI; DNQ	CAL; 34	TEX; DNQ	RCH; 36	TAL; 35	DAR; 22	IOW; 31	CLT; 37	DOV; 29	MCH; 33	ROA; 36	KEN; 35	DAY	NHA; 32	CHI; 34	IND; DNQ	IOW; 35	GLN; 33	CGV	BRI; DNQ	ATL; 34	RCH; DNQ	CHI; 32	KEN; 31	DOV; DNQ	CLT; DNQ	KAN; 32	TEX; DNQ	PHO; 35	HOM; DNQ			37th	239
2013	Morgan Shepherd	89	Dodge	DAY; DNQ	PHO	LVS					TAL; 35	DAR	CLT						DAY; 40																				50th	64
2013	Morgan Shepherd	89	Chevy				BRI; DNQ	CAL	TEX	RCH; DNQ				DOV; 36	IOW; DNQ	MCH	ROA	KEN; 35		NHA; DNQ	CHI	IND; DNQ	IOW; 35	GLN; 35	MOH	BRI; DNQ	ATL; 36	RCH; DNQ	CHI; DNQ	KEN	DOV; 27	KAN	CLT	TEX; DNQ	PHO; DNQ	HOM			50th	64
2014	Morgan Shepherd	89	Chevy	DAY	PHO	LVS	BRI	CAL	TEX	DAR	RCH	TAL	IOW	CLT	DOV; 37	MCH; DNQ	ROA	KEN	DAY	NHA	CHI	IND	IOW; 36	GLN	MOH	BRI; 39	ATL; 35	RCH; 36	CHI; DNQ	KEN; 36	DOV; 35	KAN; DNQ	CLT; DNQ	TEX; DNQ	PHO; 37	HOM			49th	54
2015	Morgan Shepherd	89	Chevy	DAY	ATL; 40	LVS; 37	PHO; DNQ	CAL	TEX	BRI; 38	RCH; DNQ	TAL	IOW	CLT	DOV; 39	MCH	CHI; 37	DAY; 39	KEN; 38	NHA; 36	IND; 38	IOW; 37	GLN; DNQ	MOH; 37	BRI; 38	ROA; 39	DAR; 35	RCH; DNQ	CHI; DNQ	KEN; 33	DOV; 33	CLT; 37	KAN; 35	TEX; 35	PHO; DNQ	HOM; DNQ			41st	128
2016	Morgan Shepherd	89	Chevy	DAY; 36	ATL; 37	LVS; 39	PHO; 39	CAL; DNQ	TEX	BRI; DNQ	RCH; 39	TAL; 39	DOV; 36	CLT; DNQ	POC; 35	MCH; 36	IOW; 37	DAY; 35	KEN; 37	NHA; 39	IND; 37	IOW; 36	GLN	MOH	BRI; 39	ROA; 37	DAR; 34	RCH; DNQ	CHI; 34	KEN; 38	DOV; 34	CLT; 39	KAN; DNQ	TEX; 39	PHO; DNQ	HOM; DNQ			45th	94
2017	Morgan Shepherd	89	Chevy	DAY; DNQ	ATL; DNQ	LVS; DNQ	PHO; 36	CAL	TEX	BRI; 39	RCH; DNQ	TAL; 35	CLT	DOV; 38	POC; 38	MCH; 40	IOW; 39	DAY	KEN; DNQ	NHA; 37	IND; 39	IOW; 38	GLN	MOH; 40	BRI; DNQ	ROA	DAR; 37	RCH; DNQ	CHI; 38	KEN; 37	DOV; 32	CLT; 38	KAN; 37	TEX; 39	PHO; 34	HOM; DNQ			46th	26
2018	Morgan Shepherd	89	Chevy	DAY; DNQ	ATL; 38	LVS; 37	PHO; 37	CAL; 38	TEX; 38	BRI; DNQ	RCH; 39	TAL; DNQ	DOV; 38	CLT; DNQ	POC; DNQ	MCH; 38	IOW; 39	CHI; DNQ	DAY	KEN; 38	NHA; 39	IOW; 38	GLN	MOH; 38	BRI; 39	ROA	DAR; 38	IND; 32	LVS	RCH; 40	CLT	DOV; 38	KAN; DNQ	TEX; 39	PHO; 39				47th	25
2018	Landon Cassill	89	Chevy																																	HOM; 38			47th	25
2019	Morgan Shepherd	89	Chevy	DAY	ATL; 35	LVS; 33	PHO; 34	CAL; 31	TEX; DNQ	BRI; 35	RCH; Wth	TAL	DOV; 35		POC; 35		IOW; 35	CHI; DNQ	DAY	KEN; 34		IOW; 36	GLN	MOH	BRI; DNQ	ROA	DAR; 37	IND; 36											41st	73
2019	Landon Cassill	89	Chevy											CLT; 34		MCH; 32					NHA; 37								LVS; 36	RCH; 36	CLT	DOV; 29	KAN; 36	TEX; 36	PHO; 38	HOM; 15			41st	73
2020	Landon Cassill	89	Chevy	DAY	LVS; 36	CAL; 36	PHO; 35	DAR; 38	CLT	BRI	ATL	HOM	HOM	TAL	TEX	DOV	MOH	MCH	CHI	POC	IND	KEN	NHA	ROA	GLN	DOV	DAY	DAR	RCH	BRI	LVS	CLT	KAN	TEX	MAR	PHO			43rd	5

==== Xfinity Series (secondary entry) ====
NASCAR Xfinity Series results
Year	Team	No.	Make	1	2	3	4	5	6	7	8	9	10	11	12	13	14	15	16	17	18	19	20	21	22	23	24	25	26	27	28	29	30	31	32	33	34	35	Owners	Pts
1987	Morgan Shepherd	77	Buick	DAY; 5	HCY	MAR	DAR	BRI	LGY	SBO	CLT	DOV	IRP	ROU	JFC	OXF	SBO	HCY	RAL	LGY	ROU	BRI	JFC	DAR	RCH	DOV	MAR	CLT	CAR	MAR										
2010	Johnny Chapman	75	Chevy	DAY	CAL	LVS	BRI	NSH	PHO	TEX	TAL	RCH	DAR	DOV	CLT	NSH	KEN	ROA	NHA; 40	DAY							BRI; Wth												79th	41
2010	Morgan Shepherd	21	Chevy																		CHI; 25	GTY; 21	IRP; 23	IOW; 35	GLN; 32	MCH; 37		CGV; 35	ATL	RCH	DOV; 30	KAN; 37	CAL; 28	CLT	GTY; 18	TEX	PHO; 31	HOM; 26	22nd	3406^{1}
2011	Brett Rowe	55	Chevy	DAY; DNQ	PHO; 39	LVS; 36	BRI; 40	CAL; 42	TEX; DNQ	TAL; Wth	NSH	RCH	DAR	DOV; 40	IOW; 43	CLT	CHI; 42	MCH; DNQ	ROA; 42	DAY	KEN	NHA	NSH	IRP	IOW	GLN; Wth	CGV; DNQ	BRI	ATL	RCH	CHI	DOV	KAN	CLT	TEX	PHO	HOM		65th	28

^{1} Includes points scored by Richard Childress Racing

==== Craftsman Truck Series ====
NASCAR Craftsman Truck Series results
Year	Team	No.	Make	1	2	3	4	5	6	7	8	9	10	11	12	13	14	15	16	17	18	19	20	21	22	23	24	25	Owners	Pts
2001	Morgan Shepherd	21	Ford	DAY	HOM	MMR	MAR; 36	GTY	DAR; 21	PPR	DOV; 24	TEX; 21	MEM; 29	MLW	KAN; 32	KEN; 31	NHA; 17	IRP; 33	NSH; 26	CIC; 33	NZH; 28	RCH; 21	SBO; 27	TEX	LVS	PHO; 30	CAL			
2002	Morgan Shepherd	21	Ford	DAY; DNQ	DAR; 34	MAR; 33	GTY; 36	PPR; 34	DOV; 32	TEX; 31	MEM; 35	MLW	KAN	KEN; DNQ	NHA	MCH	IRP	NSH; 35	RCH; 17	TEX	SBO	LVS; 29	CAL; 28	PHO; 33	HOM; 32					
2003	Morgan Shepherd	21	Ford	DAY; 26	DAR; 24	MMR	MAR; 35	CLT; 29	DOV; 26	TEX	MEM; 33	MLW; 33	KAN; 34	KEN; 28	GTW	MCH	IRP; 34	NSH; 25	BRI; 29	RCH	NHA; 33	CAL	LVS	SBO	TEX	MAR; 29	PHO; 36	HOM; 36		

Footnotes
