= 2017 O'Reilly Auto Parts 300 =

31st race of the 2017 NASCAR Xfinity Series

Race details
- Race 31 of 33 in the 2017 NASCAR Xfinity Series
- Date: November 4, 2017
- Official name: 13th Annual O'Reilly Auto Parts 300
- Location: Fort Worth, Texas, Texas Motor Speedway
- Course: Permanent racing facility
- Course length: 1.5 miles (2.41 km)
- Distance: 200 laps, 300 mi (482.803 km)
- Scheduled distance: 200 laps, 300 mi (482.803 km)
- Average speed: 133.862 miles per hour (215.430 km/h)

Pole position
Driver	Erik Jones	Joe Gibbs Racing
- Time: 28.232

Most laps led
Driver	Erik Jones	Joe Gibbs Racing
- Laps: 142

Winner
No. 20	Erik Jones	Joe Gibbs Racing

Television in the United States
- Network: NBCSN
- Announcers: Rick Allen, Jeff Burton, Steve Letarte

Radio in the United States
- Radio: Performance Racing Network

The 2017 O'Reilly Auto Parts 300 was the 31st stock car race of the 2017 NASCAR Xfinity Series season, the second race of the Round of 8, and the 13th iteration of the event. The race was held on Saturday, November 4, 2017, in Fort Worth, Texas, at Texas Motor Speedway, a 1.5 miles (2.4 km) permanent tri-oval shaped racetrack. The race took the scheduled 200 laps to complete. At race's end, Erik Jones, driving for Joe Gibbs Racing, would dominate the race to win his ninth career NASCAR Xfinity Series victory and his third and final victory of the season. To fill out the podium, Ryan Blaney, driving for Team Penske, and Kyle Larson, driving for Chip Ganassi Racing, would finish second and third, respectively.

== Entry list ==
- (R) denotes rookie driver.
- (i) denotes driver who is ineligible for series driver points.

#	Driver	Team	Make
0	Garrett Smithley	JD Motorsports	Chevrolet
00	Cole Custer (R)	Stewart–Haas Racing	Ford
1	Elliott Sadler	JR Motorsports	Chevrolet
01	Harrison Rhodes	JD Motorsports	Chevrolet
2	Austin Dillon (i)	Richard Childress Racing	Chevrolet
3	Ty Dillon (i)	Richard Childress Racing	Chevrolet
4	Ross Chastain	JD Motorsports	Chevrolet
5	Michael Annett	JR Motorsports	Chevrolet
7	Justin Allgaier	JR Motorsports	Chevrolet
07	Spencer Boyd	SS-Green Light Racing	Chevrolet
8	B. J. McLeod	B. J. McLeod Motorsports	Chevrolet
9	William Byron (R)	JR Motorsports	Chevrolet
11	Blake Koch	Kaulig Racing	Chevrolet
13	John Jackson	MBM Motorsports	Dodge
14	J. J. Yeley	TriStar Motorsports	Toyota
15	Reed Sorenson (i)	JD Motorsports	Chevrolet
16	Ryan Reed	Roush Fenway Racing	Ford
18	Christopher Bell (i)	Joe Gibbs Racing	Toyota
19	Matt Tifft (R)	Joe Gibbs Racing	Toyota
20	Erik Jones (i)	Joe Gibbs Racing	Toyota
21	Daniel Hemric (R)	Richard Childress Racing	Chevrolet
22	Ryan Blaney (i)	Team Penske	Ford
23	Spencer Gallagher (R)	GMS Racing	Chevrolet
24	Dylan Lupton	JGL Racing	Toyota
33	Brandon Jones	Richard Childress Racing	Chevrolet
38	Jeff Green	RSS Racing	Chevrolet
39	Ryan Sieg	RSS Racing	Chevrolet
40	Timmy Hill	MBM Motorsports	Chevrolet
42	Kyle Larson (i)	Chip Ganassi Racing	Chevrolet
48	Brennan Poole	Chip Ganassi Racing	Chevrolet
51	Jeremy Clements	Jeremy Clements Racing	Chevrolet
52	Joey Gase	Jimmy Means Racing	Chevrolet
62	Brendan Gaughan	Richard Childress Racing	Chevrolet
74	Mike Harmon	Mike Harmon Racing	Dodge
78	Angela Ruch	B. J. McLeod Motorsports	Chevrolet
89	Morgan Shepherd	Shepherd Racing Ventures	Chevrolet
90	Mario Gosselin	King Autosport	Chevrolet
92	Josh Williams	King Autosport	Chevrolet
93	Gray Gaulding (i)	RSS Racing	Chevrolet
99	David Starr	BJMM with SS-Green Light Racing	Chevrolet
Official entry list

== Practice ==
=== First practice ===
The first practice session was held on Friday, November 3, at 2:00 PM CST. The session would last for 45 minutes. Blake Koch, driving for Kaulig Racing, would set the fastest time in the session, with a lap of 28.519 and an average speed of 189.347 mph (304.724 km/h).

Pos.	#	Driver	Team	Make	Time	Speed
1	11	Blake Koch	Kaulig Racing	Chevrolet	28.519	189.347
2	21	Daniel Hemric (R)	Richard Childress Racing	Chevrolet	28.806	187.461
3	42	Kyle Larson (i)	Chip Ganassi Racing	Chevrolet	28.823	187.350
Full first practice results

=== Second and final practice ===
The final practice session, sometimes known as Happy Hour, was held on Friday, November 3, at 4:00 PM CST. The session would last for 55 minutes. Kyle Larson, driving for Chip Ganassi Racing, would set the fastest time in the session, with a lap of 28.327 and an average speed of 190.631 mph (306.791 km/h).

During the session, Richard Childress Racing driver Daniel Hemric wrecked in turn four, ending the practice session 15 minutes early.

Pos.	#	Driver	Team	Make	Time	Speed
1	42	Kyle Larson (i)	Chip Ganassi Racing	Chevrolet	28.327	190.631
2	22	Ryan Blaney (i)	Team Penske	Ford	28.649	188.488
3	20	Erik Jones (i)	Joe Gibbs Racing	Toyota	28.657	188.436
Full Happy Hour practice results

== Qualifying ==
Qualifying was held on Saturday, November 4, at 5:05 PM CST. Since Texas Motor Speedway is under 2 miles (3.2 km) in length, the qualifying system was a multi-car system that included three rounds. The first round was 15 minutes, where every driver would be able to set a lap within the 15 minutes. Then, the second round would consist of the fastest 24 cars in Round 1, and drivers would have 10 minutes to set a lap. Round 3 consisted of the fastest 12 drivers from Round 2, and the drivers would have 5 minutes to set a time. Whoever was fastest in Round 3 would win the pole.

Erik Jones, driving for Joe Gibbs Racing, would win the pole after setting a time of 28.232 and an average speed of 191.272 mph (307.822 km/h) in the third round.

No drivers would fail to qualify.

=== Full qualifying results ===
Pos.	#	Driver	Team	Make	Time (R1)	Speed (R1)	Time (R2)	Speed (R2)	Time (R3)	Speed (R3)
1	20	Erik Jones (i)	Joe Gibbs Racing	Toyota	28.805	187.467	28.433	189.920	28.232	191.272
2	00	Cole Custer (R)	Stewart–Haas Racing	Ford	28.774	187.669	28.542	189.195	28.406	190.101
3	19	Matt Tifft (R)	Joe Gibbs Racing	Toyota	28.721	188.016	28.472	189.660	28.428	189.954
4	22	Ryan Blaney (i)	Team Penske	Ford	28.899	186.858	28.620	188.679	28.436	189.900
5	1	Elliott Sadler	JR Motorsports	Chevrolet	28.871	187.039	28.482	189.593	28.473	189.653
6	21	Daniel Hemric (R)	Richard Childress Racing	Chevrolet	28.993	186.252	28.639	188.554	28.486	189.567
7	2	Austin Dillon (i)	Richard Childress Racing	Chevrolet	29.034	185.989	28.512	189.394	28.500	189.474
8	18	Christopher Bell (i)	Joe Gibbs Racing	Toyota	28.890	186.916	28.498	189.487	28.526	189.301
9	9	William Byron (R)	JR Motorsports	Chevrolet	28.665	188.383	28.539	189.215	28.536	189.235
10	42	Kyle Larson (i)	Chip Ganassi Racing	Chevrolet	28.884	186.955	28.534	189.248	28.635	188.580
11	33	Brandon Jones	Richard Childress Racing	Chevrolet	29.037	185.970	28.710	188.088	28.755	187.793
12	48	Brennan Poole	Chip Ganassi Racing	Chevrolet	29.035	185.982	28.691	188.212	28.832	187.292
Eliminated in Round 2
13	7	Justin Allgaier	JR Motorsports	Chevrolet	28.977	186.355	28.732	187.944	-	-
14	3	Ty Dillon (i)	Richard Childress Racing	Chevrolet	29.051	185.880	28.742	187.878	-	-
15	16	Ryan Reed	Roush Fenway Racing	Ford	29.060	185.822	28.818	187.383	-	-
16	23	Spencer Gallagher (R)	GMS Racing	Chevrolet	28.940	186.593	28.822	187.357	-	-
17	11	Blake Koch	Kaulig Racing	Chevrolet	29.078	185.707	28.846	187.201	-	-
18	5	Michael Annett	JR Motorsports	Chevrolet	29.334	184.087	28.846	187.201	-	-
19	62	Brendan Gaughan	Richard Childress Racing	Chevrolet	29.089	185.637	28.887	186.935	-	-
20	39	Ryan Sieg	RSS Racing	Chevrolet	29.236	184.704	29.038	185.963	-	-
21	14	J. J. Yeley	TriStar Motorsports	Toyota	29.190	184.995	29.064	185.797	-	-
22	8	B. J. McLeod	B. J. McLeod Motorsports	Chevrolet	29.425	183.517	29.136	185.338	-	-
23	24	Dylan Lupton	JGL Racing	Toyota	29.252	184.603	29.144	185.287	-	-
24	4	Ross Chastain	JD Motorsports	Chevrolet	29.300	184.300	-	-	-	-
Eliminated in Round 1
25	51	Jeremy Clements	Jeremy Clements Racing	Chevrolet	29.551	182.735	-	-	-	-
26	0	Garrett Smithley	JD Motorsports	Chevrolet	29.701	181.812	-	-	-	-
27	38	Jeff Green	RSS Racing	Chevrolet	29.713	181.739	-	-	-	-
28	52	Joey Gase	Jimmy Means Racing	Chevrolet	29.872	180.771	-	-	-	-
29	15	Reed Sorenson (i)	JD Motorsports	Chevrolet	30.026	179.844	-	-	-	-
30	93	Gray Gaulding (i)	RSS Racing	Chevrolet	30.064	179.617	-	-	-	-
31	99	David Starr	BJMM with SS-Green Light Racing	Chevrolet	30.091	179.456	-	-	-	-
32	01	Harrison Rhodes	JD Motorsports	Chevrolet	30.225	178.660	-	-	-	-
33	90	Mario Gosselin	King Autosport	Chevrolet	30.289	178.283	-	-	-	-
Qualified by owner's points
34	40	Timmy Hill	MBM Motorsports	Chevrolet	30.572	176.632	-	-	-	-
35	78	Angela Ruch	B. J. McLeod Motorsports	Chevrolet	30.967	174.379	-	-	-	-
36	07	Spencer Boyd	SS-Green Light Racing	Chevrolet	31.077	173.762	-	-	-	-
37	74	Mike Harmon	Mike Harmon Racing	Dodge	31.115	173.550	-	-	-	-
38	92	Josh Williams	King Autosport	Chevrolet	31.172	173.232	-	-	-	-
39	89	Morgan Shepherd	Shepherd Racing Ventures	Chevrolet	31.611	170.827	-	-	-	-
40	13	John Jackson	MBM Motorsports	Dodge	31.915	169.199	-	-	-	-
Official qualifying results
Official starting lineup

== Race results ==
Stage 1 Laps: 45

Pos.	#	Driver	Team	Make	Pts
1	20	Erik Jones (i)	Joe Gibbs Racing	Toyota	0
2	42	Kyle Larson (i)	Chip Ganassi Racing	Chevrolet	0
3	1	Elliott Sadler	JR Motorsports	Chevrolet	8
4	22	Ryan Blaney (i)	Team Penske	Ford	0
5	19	Matt Tifft (R)	Joe Gibbs Racing	Toyota	6
6	18	Christopher Bell (i)	Joe Gibbs Racing	Toyota	0
7	9	William Byron (R)	JR Motorsports	Chevrolet	4
8	48	Brennan Poole	Chip Ganassi Racing	Chevrolet	3
9	7	Justin Allgaier	JR Motorsports	Chevrolet	2
10	21	Daniel Hemric (R)	Richard Childress Racing	Chevrolet	1

Stage 2 Laps: 45

Pos.	#	Driver	Team	Make	Pts
1	20	Erik Jones (i)	Joe Gibbs Racing	Toyota	0
2	42	Kyle Larson (i)	Chip Ganassi Racing	Chevrolet	0
3	48	Brennan Poole	Chip Ganassi Racing	Chevrolet	8
4	1	Elliott Sadler	JR Motorsports	Chevrolet	7
5	19	Matt Tifft (R)	Joe Gibbs Racing	Toyota	6
6	21	Daniel Hemric (R)	Richard Childress Racing	Chevrolet	5
7	00	Cole Custer (R)	Stewart–Haas Racing	Ford	4
8	22	Ryan Blaney (i)	Team Penske	Ford	0
9	9	William Byron (R)	JR Motorsports	Chevrolet	2
10	62	Brendan Gaughan	Richard Childress Racing	Chevrolet	1

Stage 3 Laps: 110

Pos	No.	Driver	Team	Make	Laps	Led	Status	Pts
1	20	Erik Jones (i)	Joe Gibbs Racing	Toyota	200	142	running	0
2	22	Ryan Blaney (i)	Team Penske	Ford	200	34	running	0
3	42	Kyle Larson (i)	Chip Ganassi Racing	Chevrolet	200	4	running	0
4	1	Elliott Sadler	JR Motorsports	Chevrolet	200	0	running	48
5	00	Cole Custer (R)	Stewart–Haas Racing	Ford	200	0	running	36
6	18	Christopher Bell (i)	Joe Gibbs Racing	Toyota	200	0	running	0
7	48	Brennan Poole	Chip Ganassi Racing	Chevrolet	200	0	running	41
8	19	Matt Tifft (R)	Joe Gibbs Racing	Toyota	200	0	running	41
9	9	William Byron (R)	JR Motorsports	Chevrolet	200	17	running	34
10	2	Austin Dillon (i)	Richard Childress Racing	Chevrolet	200	0	running	0
11	7	Justin Allgaier	JR Motorsports	Chevrolet	200	0	running	28
12	5	Michael Annett	JR Motorsports	Chevrolet	199	1	running	25
13	11	Blake Koch	Kaulig Racing	Chevrolet	199	0	running	24
14	21	Daniel Hemric (R)	Richard Childress Racing	Chevrolet	199	0	running	29
15	23	Spencer Gallagher (R)	GMS Racing	Chevrolet	199	0	running	22
16	3	Ty Dillon (i)	Richard Childress Racing	Chevrolet	199	2	running	0
17	62	Brendan Gaughan	Richard Childress Racing	Chevrolet	199	0	running	21
18	14	J. J. Yeley	TriStar Motorsports	Toyota	199	0	running	19
19	4	Ross Chastain	JD Motorsports	Chevrolet	199	0	running	18
20	39	Ryan Sieg	RSS Racing	Chevrolet	199	0	running	17
21	24	Dylan Lupton	JGL Racing	Toyota	198	0	running	16
22	51	Jeremy Clements	Jeremy Clements Racing	Chevrolet	198	0	running	15
23	16	Ryan Reed	Roush Fenway Racing	Ford	198	0	running	14
24	0	Garrett Smithley	JD Motorsports	Chevrolet	198	0	running	13
25	01	Harrison Rhodes	JD Motorsports	Chevrolet	196	0	running	12
26	8	B. J. McLeod	B. J. McLeod Motorsports	Chevrolet	196	0	running	11
27	52	Joey Gase	Jimmy Means Racing	Chevrolet	196	0	running	10
28	90	Mario Gosselin	King Autosport	Chevrolet	195	0	running	9
29	07	Spencer Boyd	SS-Green Light Racing	Chevrolet	191	0	running	8
30	40	Timmy Hill	MBM Motorsports	Chevrolet	188	0	running	7
31	99	David Starr	BJMM with SS-Green Light Racing	Chevrolet	159	0	running	6
32	74	Mike Harmon	Mike Harmon Racing	Dodge	104	0	suspension	5
33	93	Gray Gaulding (i)	RSS Racing	Chevrolet	65	0	vibration	0
34	92	Josh Williams	King Autosport	Chevrolet	62	0	electrical	3
35	33	Brandon Jones	Richard Childress Racing	Chevrolet	60	0	crash	2
36	15	Reed Sorenson (i)	JD Motorsports	Chevrolet	52	0	electrical	0
37	38	Jeff Green	RSS Racing	Chevrolet	50	0	vibration	1
38	78	Angela Ruch	B. J. McLeod Motorsports	Chevrolet	47	0	crash	1
39	89	Morgan Shepherd	Shepherd Racing Ventures	Chevrolet	25	0	handling	1
40	13	John Jackson	MBM Motorsports	Dodge	7	0	fuel pump	1
Official race results

== Standings after the race ==
Drivers' Championship standings

	Pos	Driver	Points
2	1	Elliott Sadler	3,103
	2	William Byron	3,098 (-5)
2	3	Justin Allgaier	3,094 (-9)
	4	Brennan Poole	3,079 (–24)
	5	Matt Tifft	3,074 (–29)
2	6	Cole Custer	3,066 (-37)
	7	Daniel Hemric	3,061 (-42)
2	8	Ryan Reed	3,046 (-57)
	9	Brendan Gaughan	2,124 (-979)
	10	Michael Annett	2,106 (-997)
1	11	Blake Koch	2,083 (-1,020)
1	12	Jeremy Clements	2,079 (-1,024)
Official driver's standings

- Note: Only the first 12 positions are included for the driver standings.

Previous race: 2017 Kansas Lottery 300	NASCAR Xfinity Series; 2017 season	Next race: 2017 Ticket Galaxy 200
