= MBM Motorsports =

American stock car racing team

MBM Motorsports / Garage 66
- Owner: Carl Long
- Base: Statesville, North Carolina
- Series: NASCAR Cup Series; NASCAR Craftsman Truck Series; ARCA Menards Series; ARCA Menards Series East
- Race drivers: Cup Series: 66. Josh Bilicki (part-time); Truck Series: 69. TBA (part-time); ARCA Menards Series: 66. TBA; ARCA Menards Series East: 66. TBA; ARCA Menards Series West: 66. TBA
- Manufacturer: Ford; Chevy; Toyota; Ram
- Opened: 2014
- Website: mbmmotorsports.com

Career
- Debut: Cup Series: 2017 Go Bowling 400 (Kansas); Xfinity Series: 2014 Drive to Stop Diabetes 300 (Bristol); Craftsman Truck Series: 2014 Ford EcoBoost 200 (Homestead); ARCA Menards Series: 2017 Lucas Oil 200 (Daytona); ARCA Menards Series East: 2026 Cook Out 200 (Hickory); ARCA Menards Series West: 2026 Desert Diamond Casino West Valley 100 (Phoenix)
- Latest race: Cup Series: 2026 Season Finale 400 (Homestead); Xfinity Series: 2025 Ag-Pro 300 (Talladega); Craftsman Truck Series: 2026 Black's Tire 200 (Martinsville); ARCA Menards Series: 2026 LiUNA! 150 (IRP); ARCA Menards Series East: 2026 LiUNA! 150 (IRP); ARCA Menards Series West: 2026 Desert Diamond Casino West Valley 100 (Phoenix)
- Races competed: Total: 482; Cup Series: 153; Xfinity Series: 301; Craftsman Truck Series: 12; ARCA Menards Series: 12; ARCA Menards Series East: 3 ARCA Menards Series West: 1
- Drivers' Championships: Total: 0 Cup Series: 0 Xfinity Series: 0 Craftsman Truck Series: 0 ARCA Menards Series: 0 ARCA Menards Series East: 0 ARCA Menards Series West: 0
- Race victories: Total: 0 Cup Series: 0 Xfinity Series: 0 Craftsman Truck Series: 0 ARCA Menards Series: 0 ARCA Menards Series East: 0 ARCA Menards Series West: 0
- Pole positions: Total: 0 Cup Series: 0 Xfinity Series: 0 Craftsman Truck Series: 0 ARCA Menards Series: 0 ARCA Menards Series East: 0 ARCA Menards Series West: 0

Motorsports Business Management LLC, operating as MBM Motorsports, Garage 66, Power Source, and sometimes known as Carl Long Motorsports, is an American professional stock car racing team that currently competes in the NASCAR Cup Series, NASCAR Craftsman Truck Series, and ARCA Menards Series West. MBM was co-owned and operated by Long and driver Derek White until early 2016, with full operation of the team being taken by Long and his family after White was arrested on smuggling charges.

In the NASCAR Cup Series, the team fields the No. 66 part-time for multiple drivers. In the NASCAR Craftsman Truck Series, the team fields the No. 69 part-time for multiple drivers. In the ARCA Menards Series West, the team fields the No. 66 part-time for Dystany Spurlock. They have also competed in the NASCAR Xfinity Series, ARCA Menards Series and the ARCA Menards Series East in the past.

== History ==
Before the 2014 Drive to Stop Diabetes 300 at Bristol Motor Speedway, Derek White and Carl Long created Motorsports Business Management. In 2016, White was arrested on tobacco smuggling charges, leading to his indefinite suspension by NASCAR. Ownership of the team was transferred to the Long family; officially, the team owner is listed as Long's father, Horace.

Until the end of the 2018 season, MBM Motorsports ran Dodge cars on a limited basis in addition to the other manufacturers, using engines leased from Team Penske from when Penske ran Dodges. The team switched to Toyotas starting in 2019, and team owner Carl Long appealed to the manufacturer for support.

In November 2021, Long and eight members of his team, including driver David Starr, tested positive for COVID-19 following the 2021 season finale at Phoenix Raceway. That led to Starr reuniting with his former Truck Series team SS-Green Light Racing in the Xfinity Series.

== Cup Series ==
=== Car No. 13 history ===
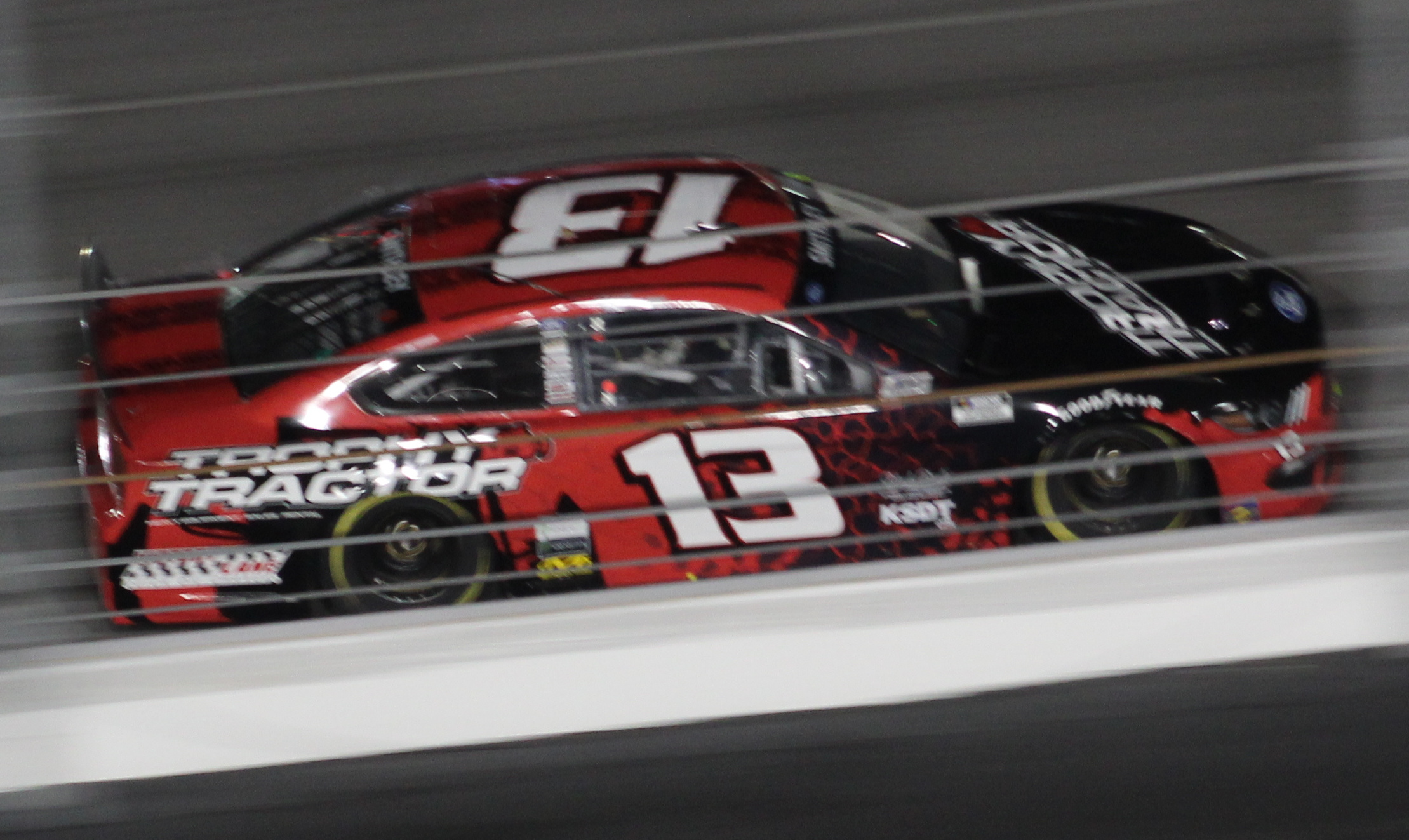
Garrett Smithley in the No. 13 at Daytona International Speedway in 2021

When the No. 13 became available following Germain Racing's shutdown, MBM renumbered their car again in 2021. Garrett Smithley attempted the 2021 Daytona 500, but was involved in an accident with Noah Gragson, leading them both to miss the race. The No. 13 returned at the NASCAR Open at Texas Motor Speedway with David Starr behind the wheel. Starr returned at Nashville and finished 35th. Timmy Hill scored the team's best finish of 27th at Texas.

==== Car No. 13 results ====
Year	Driver	No.	Make	1	2	3	4	5	6	7	8	9	10	11	12	13	14	15	16	17	18	19	20	21	22	23	24	25	26	27	28	29	30	31	32	33	34	35	36	Owners	Pts
2021	Garrett Smithley	13	Ford	DAY; DNQ	DRC	HOM	LVS	PHO	ATL	BRI	MAR	RCH	TAL	KAN	DAR	DOV	COA	CLT	SON																					42nd	20
2021	David Starr	13	Toyota																	NSH; 34	POC	POC	ROA	ATL	NHA	GLN	IRC	MCH	DAY	DAR	RCH	BRI	LVS	TAL	ROV		KAN; 34	MAR	PHO; 33	42nd	20
2021	Timmy Hill	13	Toyota																																	TEX; 27				42nd	20

=== Car No. 46 history ===
During the 2018–19 offseason, MBM Motorsports hinted at running a second Cup car at some point in the 2019 season along with the usual No. 66. In late April, the team announced their intention to enter a second car in the Digital Ally 400 at Kansas, leading to Joey Gase driving the No. 46 Camry in the race.

==== Car No. 46 results ====
Year	Driver	No.	Make	1	2	3	4	5	6	7	8	9	10	11	12	13	14	15	16	17	18	19	20	21	22	23	24	25	26	27	28	29	30	31	32	33	34	35	36	Owners	Pts
2019	Joey Gase	46	Toyota	DAY	ATL	LVS	PHO	CAL	MAR	TEX	BRI	RCH	TAL	DOV	KAN; 38	CLT	POC	MCH	SON	CHI	DAY	KEN	NHA	POC	GLN	MCH	BRI	DAR	IND	LVS	RCH	ROV	DOV	TAL	KAN	MAR	TEX	PHO	HOM	45th	1

=== Car No. 49 history ===
In 2020, the No. 46 car was renumbered to No. 49. Chad Finchum failed to qualify for the 2020 Daytona 500 after finishing twentieth in Duel 1 of the 2020 Bluegreen Vacations Duels. Finchum also drove the No. 49 in the South Point 400, Hollywood Casino 400 and the Autotrader EchoPark Automotive 500 with a best finish of 35th.

==== Car No. 49 results ====
Year	Driver	No.	Make	1	2	3	4	5	6	7	8	9	10	11	12	13	14	15	16	17	18	19	20	21	22	23	24	25	26	27	28	29	30	31	32	33	34	35	36	Owners	Pts
2020	Chad Finchum	49	Toyota	DAY; DNQ	LVS	CAL	PHO	DAR	DAR	CLT	CLT	BRI	ATL	MAR	HOM	TAL	POC	POC	IND	KEN	TEX	KAN	NHA	MCH	MCH	DRC	DOV	DOV	DAY	DAR	RCH	BRI	LVS; 39	TAL	ROV	KAN; 39	TEX; 35	MAR	PHO	44th	4

=== Car No. 55 history ===
In 2022, J. J. Yeley attempted to race the Daytona 500 in the No. 55 with sponsor Hex.com, but failed to qualify. He ran the car again at Talladega, finishing 25th.

==== Car No. 55 results ====
Year	Driver	No.	Make	1	2	3	4	5	6	7	8	9	10	11	12	13	14	15	16	17	18	19	20	21	22	23	24	25	26	27	28	29	30	31	32	33	34	35	36	Owners	Pts
2022	J. J. Yeley	55	Ford	DAY; DNQ	CAL	LVS	PHO	ATL	COA	RCH	MAR	BRD	TAL; 25	DOV	DAR	KAN	CLT	GTW	SON	NSH	ROA	ATL	NHA	POC	IRC	MCH	RCH	GLN	DAY	DAR	KAN	BRI	TEX	TAL	ROV	LVS	HOM	MAR	PHO	42nd	12

=== Car No. 66 history ===
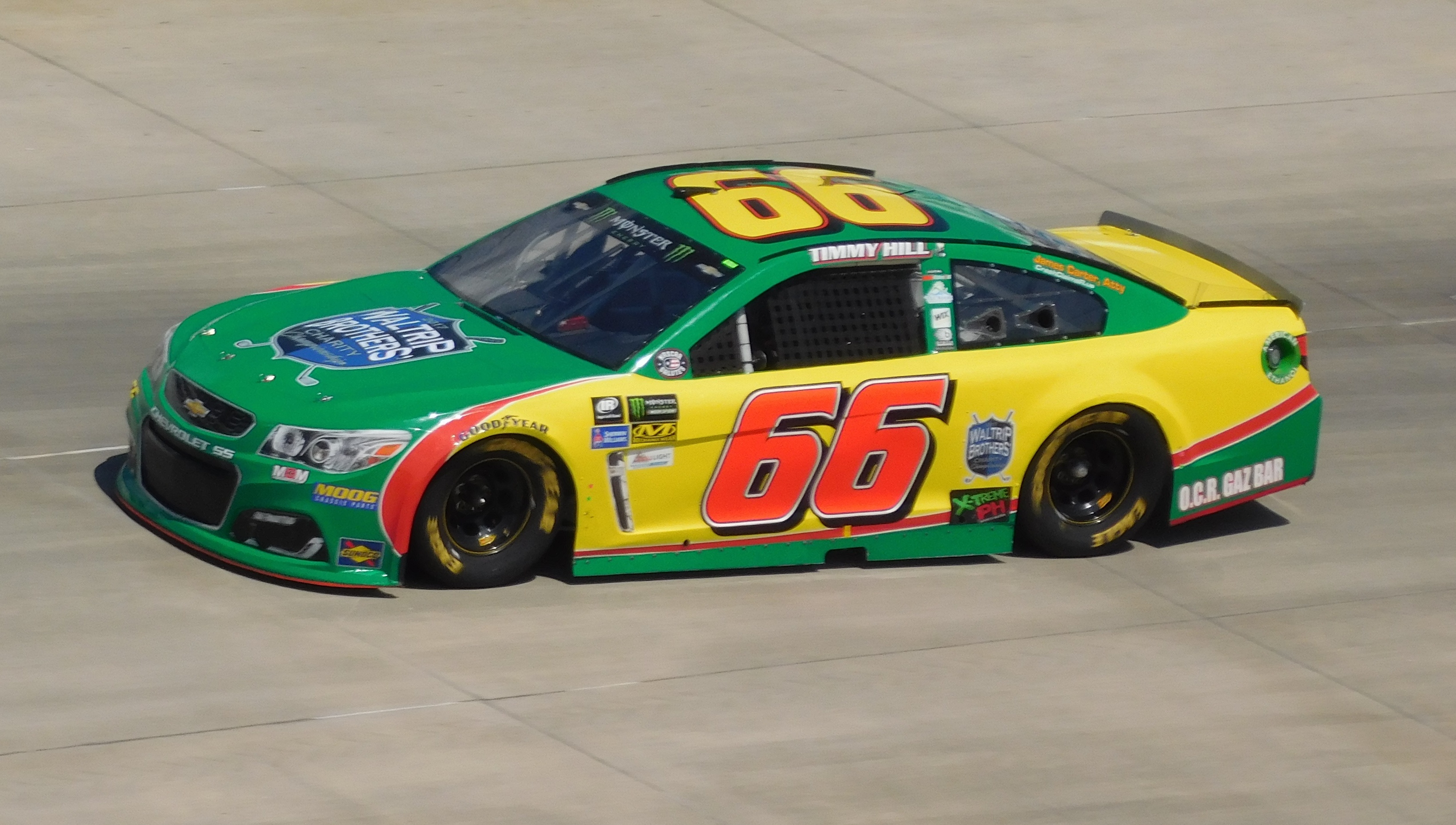
Timmy Hill in the No. 66 in 2017

In the offseason, MBM Motorsports bought an HScott Motorsports car. In May 2017, Long announced his intention to field a Monster Energy NASCAR Cup Series car, the No. 66 Chevrolet SS, at Kansas Speedway's Go Bowling 400. The number was selected as a tribute to Mark Thompson, while the paint scheme was nearly identical to the No. 46 car Long drove in the Cup Series before his ban from the Cup garage in 2009; the green and yellow colors remained, though the red roof number was changed to yellow. Although the team received sponsorship from marijuana vaping manufacturer Veedverks, NASCAR prevented the company from appearing on the car after Long mistakenly put the company name wrong in his sponsor submission to NASCAR, spelling it with an "o" instead of a "d"; upon further investigation by NASCAR, the sanctioning body ordered Long to remove the sponsorship. Long missed the first practice session before running 14 laps in the second session, followed by being unable to set a qualifying lap as he was one of eleven cars stuck in inspection during the session. This relegated Long to a 40th-place starting spot, from which he finished 31st.

The No. 66 returned for the AAA 400 Drive for Autism at Dover, though with Timmy Hill at the helm. Hill improved the team's best finish by three positions as he finished 28th. After that race, the team announced that they wouldn't enter in the next races to keep the focus on the Xfinity team. The team returned at Kentucky with Hill; two weeks later, Hill would return in the No. 66 for the Brantley Gilbert Big Machine Brickyard 400. After avoiding several crashes by restarting at the very back, he finished fourteenth – the best finish so far for the team.

The team purchased a Richard Petty Motorsports car for Mark Thompson to drive in the Daytona 500. Thompson would finish 22nd in the race, his best career Cup Series finish. The No. 66 car didn't return until the Bristol race in April, with Chad Finchum making his Cup debut. He started 38th and would end up 33rd after crashing out late in the race. The team returned with Hill starting at Kansas, running a handful of races throughout the season.

In 2019, it was announced that Joey Gase would be driving the No. 66 car in the Cup Series part-time, with engines that they acquired from the buyout of Triad Racing Technologies. Gase attempted to make the starting grid for the 2019 Daytona 500, but ultimately failed to qualify.

Timmy Hill made the starting lineup of the 2020 Daytona 500 after finishing sixteenth in Duel 2 of the 2020 Bluegreen Vacations Duels. That same year, Hill posted two top-20 finishes, one at Bristol and another at Talladega.

In 2021, Hill returned full-time. However, after Hill was not invited to the eNASCAR iRacing Pro Invitational Series race at the Bristol Motor Speedway dirt track, the 66 team was not able to run the full season due to a lack of sponsorship. Although Hill got into the race, he was driving a Team Penske car, not an MBM car. Mike Marlar made his series debut at the Bristol dirt track, and Chad Finchum drove the No. 66 at Nashville Superspeedway. Hill returned at the NASCAR Open at Texas Motor Speedway, with a chance of him being voted into the NASCAR All-Star Race. Hill returned for the first points-paying race since Atlanta in the 2021 Pocono Raceway doubleheader, finishing 35th and 37th.

In 2022, Hill attempted to race the Daytona 500 with sponsor Bumper.com but failed to qualify. Road course ringer Boris Said would run the car at COTA, where he finished 26th.

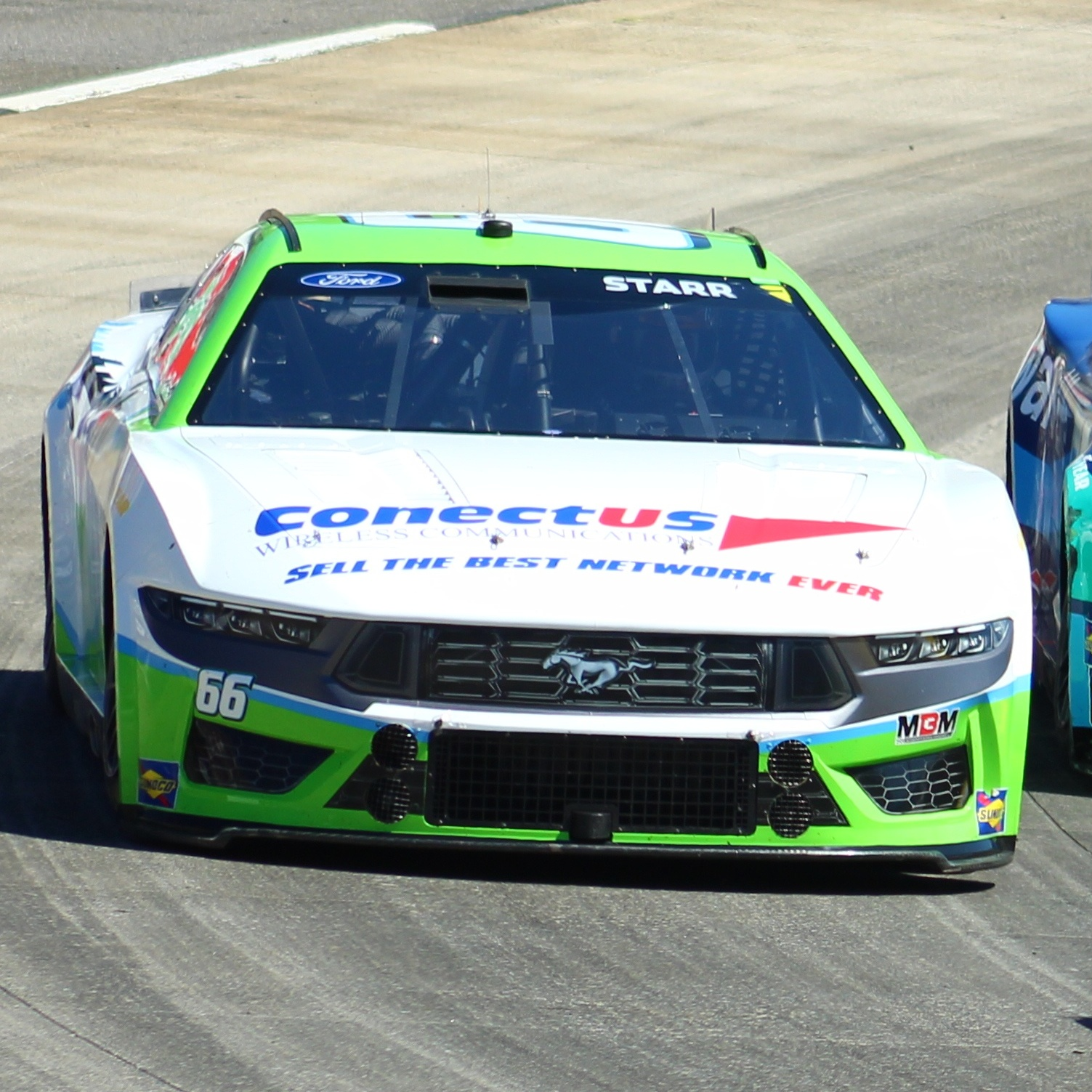
David Starr in the No. 66 in 2024.

In 2024, it was announced that Hill would drive the No. 66 in the EchoPark Automotive Grand Prix at COTA. David Starr drove the car at Martinsville, where he finished 37th due to steering issues. B.J Mcleod would join the team for the Coca-Cola 600, finishing 37th in the rain shortened event. Josh Bilicki drove the No. 66 in the Grant Park 165 at the Chicago Street Course, and finished a respectable 28th place. Chad Finchum returned to the team at Nashville for his first start in the Next Gen car, with sponsorship from Cooper and Hunter Electrical. He would finish 38th after having electrical issues. McLeod would then join the team again at the Brickyard 400 with sponsorship from Coble Enterprises. After having an oil sensor go bad during practice, the team would finish 39th in the race due to a blown engine. On August 5 MBM posted on their social media asking fans if they wanted to see them at the race track again. When the entry list came out for Richmond, the team was on it with Parker Retzlaff making his Cup Series debut, as he had to make a non super speedway start in order to run at Daytona. It was later announced that XINSURANCE would serve as the primary sponsor. Retzlaff would finish 35th. Timmy Hill would then return in the Southern 500 at Darligton, finishing 35th after a steering issue. At the Charlotte Roval, Josh Bilicki gave the team their second best performance of the season with a 29th-place finish. On November 15, it was announced that Finchum would make his return with the team in Homestead. He finished the race 37th. Bilicki was announced as the driver for the penultimate race of the season in Martinsville, where he would finish 37th. Finchum returned for the finale in Phoenix, finishing 36th.

In November 2024, MBM announced it will attempt the 2025 Daytona 500, with an engine leased from Roush-Yates Engines. Two months later on January 2, it was announced that Mike Wallace will drive the No. 66 at Daytona. A few days later, NASCAR deemed Wallace ineligible to compete in the race due to his inactivity in major professional motorsports. On January 18, the Cup Series team was rebranded as Garage 66. In addition, the team announced that Garrett Smithley would drive the No. 66 car at the 2025 Cook Out Clash at Bowman Gray Stadium. On January 22, it was announced that Chandler Smith attempted the Daytona 500 with the No. 66, but failed to qualify. On March 13, it was announced that Casey Mears will drive the No. 66 at the spring race at Martinsville Speedway. Throughout the year, Josh Bilicki, Chad Finchum, David Starr, and Joey Gase all filled in the No. 66.

On February 3, 2026, it was announced that Casey Mears would attempt to qualify the 2026 Daytona 500 in the No. 66 car. Mears would finish eighth in his duel and make the field for the race. Mears piloted the car to a 32nd-place finish. On March 11, 2026, it was announced that Timmy Hill would drive the No. 66 at Darlington.

==== Car No. 66 results ====
Year	Driver	No.	Make	1	2	3	4	5	6	7	8	9	10	11	12	13	14	15	16	17	18	19	20	21	22	23	24	25	26	27	28	29	30	31	32	33	34	35	36	Owners	Pts
2017	Carl Long	66	Chevy	DAY	ATL	LVS	PHO	CAL	MAR	TEX	BRI	RCH	TAL	KAN; 31	CLT													DAR; 33	RCH							MAR; 36				42nd	66
2017	Timmy Hill	66	Chevy													DOV; 28	POC	MCH	SON	DAY	KEN; 31	NHA	IND; 14	POC	GLN	MCH	BRI; DNQ			CHI; 39	NHA	DOV; 40	CLT; 33	TAL	KAN					42nd	66
2017	David Starr	66	Chevy																																		TEX; 38		HOM; 36	42nd	66
2017	David Starr	66	Toyota																																			PHO; 28		42nd	66
2018	Mark Thompson	66	Ford	DAY; 22	ATL	LVS	PHO	CAL	MAR	TEX																														41st	44
2018	Chad Finchum	66	Toyota								BRI; 33	RCH	TAL	DOV																										41st	44
2018	Timmy Hill	66	Toyota												KAN; 32	CLT; 32	POC	MCH; 35	SON	CHI; 39	DAY	KEN; 34	NHA	POC; 36	GLN		BRI; 28	DAR; 37	IND; 35	LVS; 33	RCH; 39	ROV; 38	DOV; 39	TAL	KAN; 40	MAR; 38	TEX; DNQ	PHO; 39	HOM; 37	41st	44
2018	Timmy Hill	66	Chevy																							MCH; 37														41st	44
2019	Joey Gase	66	Toyota	DAY; DNQ	ATL	LVS; 38	PHO	CAL; 35	MAR			RCH; 33	TAL	DOV		CLT; 32	POC	MCH	SON	CHI	DAY	KEN	NHA	POC	GLN	MCH	BRI	DAR; 34	IND	LVS; 38	RCH			TAL; 36	KAN; 38	MAR		PHO; 38		42nd	35
2019	Timmy Hill	66	Toyota							TEX; 38	BRI; 35				KAN; 39																	ROV; 30	DOV				TEX; 37		HOM; 33	42nd	35
2020	Timmy Hill	66	Ford	DAY; 27																														TAL; 15						37th	164
2020	Timmy Hill	66	Toyota		LVS; 38	CAL; 37	PHO; 38	DAR; 33	DAR; 33	CLT; 34	CLT; 33	BRI; 19	ATL; 39	MAR; 39	HOM; 34	TAL; 33	POC; 35	POC; 29	IND; 29	KEN; 37	TEX; 36	KAN; 38	NHA; 33	MCH; 33	MCH; 35	DRC; 29	DOV; 34	DOV; 36	DAY; 24	DAR; 35	RCH; 38	BRI; 37	LVS; 37		ROV; 38	KAN; 34	TEX; 30	MAR; 29	PHO; 36	37th	164
2021	Timmy Hill	66	Ford	DAY; DNQ									TAL; 29	KAN	DAR	DOV	COA																							41st	85
2021	Timmy Hill	66	Toyota		DRC; 29	HOM; 38	LVS; 36	PHO; 38	ATL; 36												POC; 35	POC; 37	ROA	ATL	NHA	GLN	IRC; 27	MCH							ROV; 32			MAR; 37	PHO; 38	41st	85
2021	Mike Marlar	66	Toyota							BRD; 31	MAR	RCH																												41st	85
2021	David Starr	66	Toyota															CLT; 36	SON													BRI; 32								41st	85
2021	Chad Finchum	66	Toyota																	NSH; 33																	KAN; 40			41st	85
2021	David Starr	66	Ford																										DAY; 27	DAR	RCH					TEX; 23				41st	85
2021	J. J. Yeley	66	Toyota																														LVS; 38							41st	85
2021	James Davison	66	Ford																															TAL; 34						41st	85
2022	Timmy Hill	66	Ford	DAY; DNQ	CAL	LVS	PHO	ATL																																43rd	11
2022	Boris Said	66	Ford						COA; 26	RCH	MAR	BRD	TAL	DOV	DAR	KAN	CLT	GTW	SON	NSH	ROA	ATL	NHA	POC	IRC	MCH	RCH	GLN	DAY	DAR	KAN	BRI	TEX	TAL	ROV	LVS	HOM	MAR	PHO	43rd	11
2024	Timmy Hill	66	Ford	DAY	ATL	LVS	PHO	BRI	COA; 36	RCH																			DAR; 35	ATL	GLN									44th	32
2024	David Starr	66	Ford								MAR; 37	TEX	TAL	DOV	KAN	DAR				IOW; Wth	NHA																			44th	32
2024	B. J. McLeod	66	Ford														CLT; 37	GTW	SON						IND; 39															44th	32
2024	Chad Finchum	66	Ford																			NSH; 38															HOM; 37		PHO; 36	44th	32
2024	Josh Bilicki	66	Ford																				CSC; 28	POC								BRI; 34	KAN	TAL	ROV; 29	LVS		MAR; 37		44th	32
2024	Parker Retzlaff	66	Ford																							RCH; 35	MCH	DAY												44th	32
2025	Chandler Smith	66	Ford	DAY; DNQ	ATL	COA	PHO	LVS	HOM																															39th	80
2025	Casey Mears	66	Ford							MAR; 35	DAR																		DAY; 29								TAL; 18	MAR; 33	PHO; 36	39th	80
2025	Josh Bilicki	66	Ford									BRI; 39	TAL			CLT; 33						CSC; 21	SON	DOV	IND; 34		GLN; 37	RCH							ROV; 32	LVS				39th	80
2025	Chad Finchum	66	Ford											TEX; 37	KAN		NSH; 35	MCH	MXC	POC												BRI; 35	NHA	KAN						39th	80
2025	David Starr	66	Ford																		ATL; 29																			39th	80
2025	Joey Gase	66	Ford																							IOW; 37														39th	80
2025	Timmy Hill	66	Ford																											DAR; 35	GTW									39th	80
2026	Casey Mears	66	Ford	DAY; 32	ATL; Wth	COA	PHO	LVS																																38th	64
2026	Timmy Hill	66	Ford						DAR; 37	MAR						CLT; 36																								38th	64
2026	Chad Finchum	66	Ford								BRI; 36	KAN	TAL; 28	TEX; 33			NSH; 28	MCH	POC	COR	SON		ATL; 33	NWS; 35	IND	IOW				DAR; 38	GTW								HOM; 38	38th	64
2026	Josh Bilicki	66	Ford												GLN; 34							CHI; Wth					RCH; 35	NHA				BRI; 37	KAN	LVS				MAR; 37		38th	64
2026	Gray Gaulding	66	Ford																										DAY; DNQ						CLT; 36	PHO	TAL; 23			38th	64

== Xfinity Series ==
=== Car No. 13 history ===
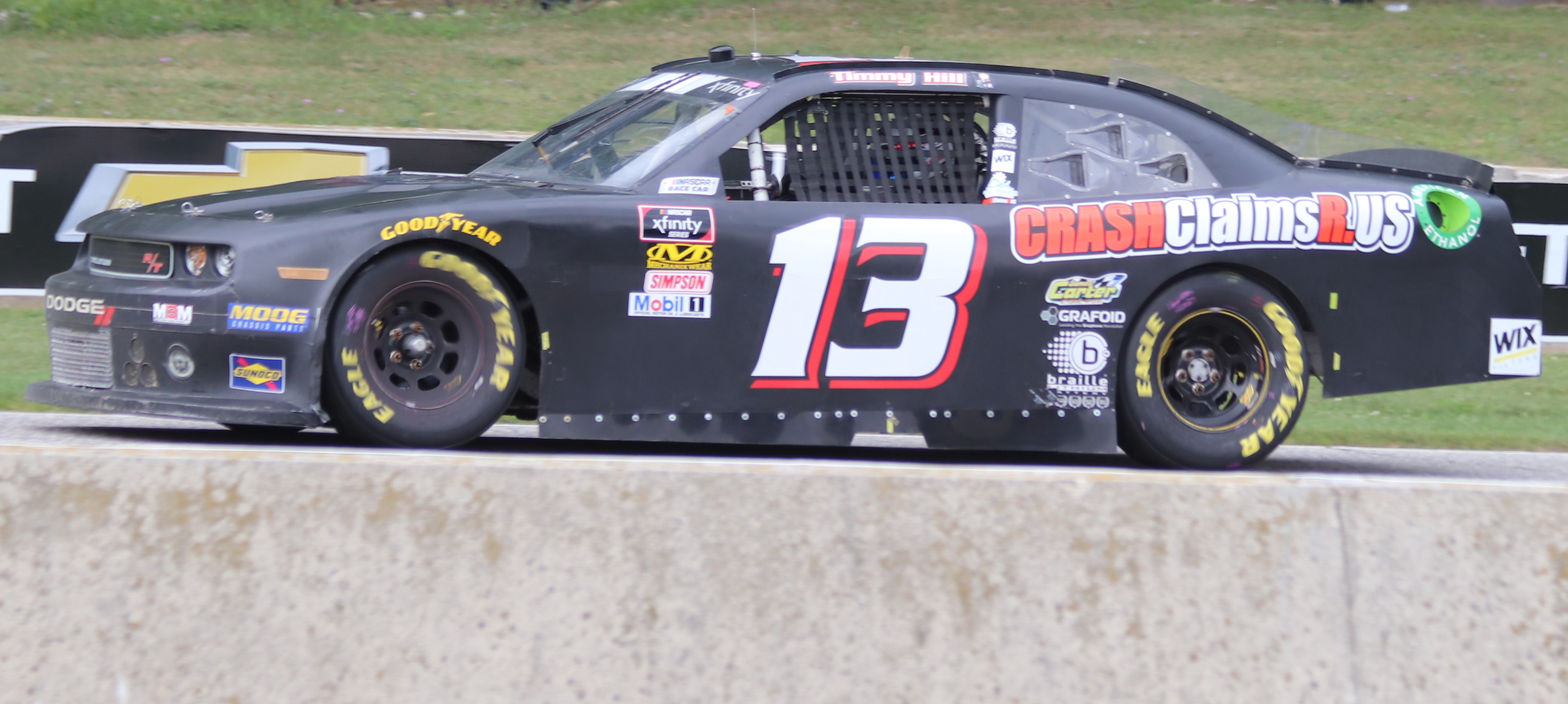
Timmy Hill driving the No. 13 car in 2018

In the team's debut, Long and White fielded the No. 13 car for Matt Carter. Carter finished 37th after retiring from the race for brake problems. Later in the year, MBM fielded rides in six races for White, Long and Mike Wallace, failing to qualify for four and not finishing any races.

In 2015, the car was run with various drivers, with some drivers using their old 2012 Toyota Camrys due to the costs of updating their cars. Brad Teague made his final NASCAR start at the Food City 300, finishing 26th, using his old 2012 Toyota Camry. The team was noted for being the final in the Nationwide Series to use that body style.

The team returned in 2016, once again running with various drivers. Mark Thompson returned to the No. 13 at the Subway Firecracker 250, leading his first Xfinity Series lap during the race. It was announced on MBM's Facebook page in August that Timmy Hill had signed to drive with the team for the remainder of the 2016 season.

With the No. 66 taking over as the team's second full-time entry, the part-time entry was renumbered as No. 13. Team owner Carl Long drove some races in the car in 2018.

In 2019, Max Tullman, Joe Nemechek and Tommy Joe Martins joined the team. The team's best finish was first achieved at Daytona with Tullman finishing 28th, with Long finishing in the same position at Dover.

In 2020, Chad Finchum drove most of the schedule in the 13. The team was more consistent, with their best finish being an 11th-place finish at Talladega.

In 2021, David Starr was announced to run almost the full schedule in the 13, but moved over to the 61 after Las Vegas. Loris Hezemans and Matt Jaskol both made their series debut that year. Starr was scheduled to return to the 13 at Mid-Ohio Sports Car Course, but replaced Stephen Leicht in the 61 since he failed to qualify in the 13 as there was no qualifying and Starr failed to qualify the previous week at Charlotte Motor Speedway.

In 2022, the No. 13 was reduced to a partial schedule with multiple drivers such as Stan Mullis, Chad Finchum, Natalie Decker, Timmy Hill, Matt Jaskol, J. J. Yeley, Will Rodgers, and Akinori Ogata splitting the ride. Following Talladega, MBM bought the owner points of RSS Racing's No. 28 and after 2 DNQs. Finchum finally managed to qualify the No. 13 at Dover. Matt Jaskol achieved what was then the No. 13's best finish, finishing eighteenth. In August's Daytona race, Hill gave his team a best finish of second-place finish, beaten by another underdog race winner Jeremy Clements.

This first race in 2024 with the number 13 would come at Indianapolis as MBM owner Carl Long announced that the team would be switching and using the 13 as their primary number rather than the 66, with the owner points transferred from the 66 to the 13. Driver B. J. McLeod would have sponsorship from rock band Falling in Reverse and would finish 28th. Kyle Keller attempted to qualify the No. 13 at Watkins Glen but failed to qualify.

==== Car No. 13 results ====
Year	Driver	No.	Make	1	2	3	4	5	6	7	8	9	10	11	12	13	14	15	16	17	18	19	20	21	22	23	24	25	26	27	28	29	30	31	32	33	Owners	Pts
2014	Carl Long	13	Toyota	DAY; DNQ											DOV; 34	MCH; 34	ROA	KEN	DAY	NHA; Wth	CHI	IND	IOW	GLN	MOH												53rd	45
2014	Carl Long	13	Dodge																							BRI; DNQ	ATL	RCH	CHI; DNQ	KEN; DNQ	DOV; 32	KAN	CLT	TEX	PHO	HOM	53rd	45
2014	Matt Carter	13	Toyota		PHO	LVS	BRI; 37	CAL		DAR; 36																											53rd	45
2014	Mike Wallace	13	Toyota						TEX; 37																												53rd	45
2014	Derek White	13	Toyota								RCH; 34	TAL	IOW	CLT																							53rd	45
2015	Chris Cockrum	13	Chevy	DAY; 21																																	34th	410
2015	Cody Ware	13	Dodge		ATL; 31																																34th	410
2015	Derek White	13	Toyota			LVS; 28		CAL; 33											KEN; 36																		34th	410
2015	Derek White	13	Dodge																	NHA; 27																HOM; 35	34th	410
2015	Derek White	13	Chevy																															TEX; 31			34th	410
2015	Carl Long	13	Dodge				PHO; 32							CLT; 36																							34th	410
2015	Carl Long	13	Toyota																											KEN; 26							34th	410
2015	Timmy Hill	13	Dodge						TEX; 35						DOV; 31																						34th	410
2015	Timmy Hill	13	Toyota							BRI; 34	RCH; 38																										34th	410
2015	Mark Thompson	13	Dodge									TAL; 27						DAY; DNQ																			34th	410
2015	John Jackson	13	Dodge										IOW; 31																								34th	410
2015	John Jackson	13	Chevy																			IOW; 36															34th	410
2015	Josh Reaume	13	Chevy													MCH; 29													CHI; 30								34th	410
2015	Josh Reaume	13	Toyota														CHI; 33											RCH; 28									34th	410
2015	Josh Reaume	13	Dodge																												DOV; 34						34th	410
2015	B. J. McLeod	13	Dodge																		IND; 32																34th	410
2015	B. J. McLeod	13	Chevy																								DAR; 31										34th	410
2015	Kevin O'Connell	13	Dodge																				GLN; 33														34th	410
2015	Tim Cowen	13	Ford																					MOH; 30		ROA; 25											34th	410
2015	Brad Teague	13	Toyota																						BRI; 26												34th	410
2015	Harrison Rhodes	13	Dodge																													CLT; 34	KAN; 27				34th	410
2015	Rubén Pardo	13	Toyota																																PHO; 38		34th	410
2016	Mark Thompson	13	Toyota	DAY; DNQ														DAY; 31																			35th	295
2016	Josh Reaume	13	Dodge		ATL; 34																																35th	295
2016	Derek White	13	Dodge			LVS; 36																															35th	295
2016	D. J. Kennington	13	Dodge				PHO; 36																														35th	295
2016	Carl Long	13	Dodge					CAL; DNQ																													35th	295
2016	Carl Long	13	Toyota											CLT; 30																							35th	295
2016	Carl Long	13	Chevy																								DAR; 32										35th	295
2016	Matt DiBenedetto	13	Toyota						TEX; 32																												35th	295
2016	Timmy Hill	13	Dodge							BRI; 32	RCH; 31		DOV; 26						NHA; 22																		35th	295
2016	Timmy Hill	13	Toyota																										CHI; 25	KEN; 34							35th	295
2016	John Jackson	13	Toyota									TAL; 32																									35th	295
2016	John Jackson	13	Chevy																			IOW; 40															35th	295
2016	T. J. Bell	13	Dodge												POC; 32																						35th	295
2016	Harrison Rhodes	13	Dodge													MCH; 26																					35th	295
2016	Harrison Rhodes	13	Chevy														IOW; 26		KEN; 38						BRI; 38												35th	295
2016	Harrison Rhodes	13	Toyota																		IND; 34																35th	295
2016	Stanton Barrett	13	Dodge																				GLN; 19														35th	295
2016	Tim Cowen	13	Ford																					MOH; 37													35th	295
2016	Alon Day	13	Dodge																							ROA; 30											35th	295
2016	Brandon Hightower	13	Dodge																									RCH; 35			DOV; 25	CLT; 34	KAN; 39	TEX; 35	PHO; 26	HOM; 30	35th	295
2017	Mark Thompson	13	Toyota	DAY; DNQ								TAL; 28						DAY; 29																			43rd	84
2017	Carl Long	13	Toyota		ATL; DNQ		PHO; 38		TEX; 39								IOW; 38																		PHO; 36		43rd	84
2017	Carl Long	13	Dodge							BRI; 27	RCH; 34				POC; 39												DAR; 38										43rd	84
2017	Carl Long	13	Chevy																	NHA; 36																	43rd	84
2017	Brandon Hightower	13	Chevy			LVS; 38																															43rd	84
2017	Timmy Hill	13	Chevy					CAL; 30																							DOV; 33						43rd	84
2017	Timmy Hill	13	Toyota										CLT; 38	DOV; 39		MCH; 39			KEN; 38		IND; 36																43rd	84
2017	Timmy Hill	13	Dodge																				GLN; 37		BRI; 36			RCH; 38	CHI; 36	KEN; 36		CLT; 35	KAN; 36			HOM; 37	43rd	84
2017	Bobby Dale Earnhardt	13	Chevy																			IOW; DNQ															43rd	84
2017	Enrique Baca	13	Dodge																					MOH; 18													43rd	84
2017	Ernie Francis Jr.	13	Toyota																							ROA; 39											43rd	84
2017	John Jackson	13	Dodge																															TEX; 40			43rd	84
2018	Timmy Hill	13	Toyota	DAY	ATL	LVS	PHO	CAL	TEX	BRI	RCH	TAL	DOV; 35	CLT	POC	MCH	IOW; 37	CHI; 37	DAY	KEN	NHA; 38	IOW	GLN		BRI; 38			IND; DNQ		RCH; 38			KAN; 31	TEX; 35		HOM; 35	46th	30
2018	Timmy Hill	13	Dodge																							ROA; 35	DAR										46th	30
2018	John Jackson	13	Dodge																					MOH; 35													46th	30
2018	Stan Mullis	13	Toyota																										LVS; 37								46th	30
2018	Landon Cassill	13	Dodge																												CLT; 38						46th	30
2018	Carl Long	13	Toyota																													DOV; 36					46th	30
2018	Tyler Hill	13	Dodge																																PHO; 31		46th	30
2019	Max Tullman	13	Toyota	DAY; 28																																	38th	97
2019	John Jackson	13	Toyota		ATL; 37			CAL; 30		BRI; 37			DOV; 37		POC; 31					KEN; 31																	38th	97
2019	Stan Mullis	13	Toyota			LVS; 35	PHO; 36																						LVS; 35	RCH; 37							38th	97
2019	Timmy Hill	13	Toyota						TEX; 37		RCH; 37					MCH; 31	IOW; 36					IOW; 35											KAN; DNQ	TEX; 35		HOM; 34	38th	97
2019	Chad Finchum	13	Toyota									TAL; 36											GLN; 32	MOH; 35		ROA; 35		IND; 33			CLT; 36				PHO; 32		38th	97
2019	Joe Nemechek	13	Toyota											CLT; 32				CHI; DNQ	DAY; 36																		38th	97
2019	Carl Long	13	Toyota																		NHA; 38											DOV; 28					38th	97
2019	Tommy Joe Martins	13	Toyota																						BRI; 31		DAR; 35										38th	97
2020	Chad Finchum	13	Toyota	DAY; 20	LVS; 21	CAL; 20	PHO; 24	DAR; 24	CLT; 22	BRI; 24	ATL; 34	HOM; 30	HOM; 21	TAL; 22	POC; 26		KEN; 16	KEN; 33	TEX; 24	KAN; 29			DOV; 29	DOV; 24	DAY; 25	DAR; 20					TAL; 11						26th	430
2020	Timmy Hill	13	Toyota													IND; 19													BRI; 15	LVS; 28			KAN; 22	TEX; 36	MAR; 17	PHO; 23	26th	430
2020	Jesse Iwuji	13	Toyota																		ROA; 26																26th	430
2020	Bobby Reuse	13	Toyota																			DAY; 30															26th	430
2020	Stephen Leicht	13	Toyota																								RCH; 34	RCH; 22				CLT; 24					26th	430
2021	Chad Finchum	13	Ford	DAY; 30																																	41st	92
2021	Chad Finchum	13	Toyota						ATL; 39						CLT; 15							NHA; DNQ					DAR; DNQ										41st	92
2021	David Starr	13	Toyota		DAY; 38	HOM; 21																	GLN; DNQ														41st	92
2021	David Starr	13	Ford				LVS; 29																														41st	92
2021	Loris Hezemans	13	Chevy					PHO; 31																													41st	92
2021	Matt Jaskol	13	Toyota							MAR; 28		DAR; 34	DOV; 39																								41st	92
2021	Jason White	13	Ford								TAL; 39																										41st	92
2021	Boris Said	13	Toyota											COA; 31																							41st	92
2021	Timmy Hill	13	Toyota													MOH; DNQ	TEX; DNQ	NSH; DNQ	POC; DNQ		ATL; DNQ				MCH; DNQ	DAY; DNQ		RCH; DNQ	BRI; DNQ	LVS; DNQ	TAL; DNQ	CLT; DNQ	TEX; DNQ	KAN; DNQ	MAR; DNQ		41st	92
2021	Stephen Leicht	13	Toyota																	ROA; 26				IND; DNQ												PHO; DNQ	41st	92
2022	Stan Mullis	13	Toyota	DAY	CAL	LVS; DNQ	PHO; DNQ																														37th	233
2022	Chad Finchum	13	Toyota					ATL; DNQ	COA	RCH	MAR; DNQ		DOV; 32														DAR; DNQ		BRI; DNQ						MAR; 36		37th	233
2022	Natalie Decker	13	Ford									TAL; DNQ								ATL; 27																	37th	233
2022	Timmy Hill	13	Toyota											DAR; 33	TEX; 27	CLT; 38						POC; 30										CLT; 28					37th	233
2022	Timmy Hill	13	Chevy																							DAY; 2					TAL; 27						37th	233
2022	Timmy Hill	13	Ford																															HOM; 29			37th	233
2022	Matt Jaskol	13	Toyota														PIR; 18																LVS; 32				37th	233
2022	J. J. Yeley	13	Toyota															NSH; 33							GLN; Wth												37th	233
2022	Will Rodgers	13	Toyota																ROA; 38																		37th	233
2022	Akinori Ogata	13	Toyota																		NHA; 25			MCH; DNQ				KAN; DNQ		TEX; 35							37th	233
2022	Brad Perez	13	Toyota																				IND; DNQ														37th	233
2022	Dawson Cram	13	Ford																																	PHO; 31	37th	233
2023	Timmy Hill	13	Toyota	DAY; DNQ	CAL	LVS	PHO	ATL	COA	RCH	MAR																										52nd	0
2023	Jason White	13	Ford									TAL; DNQ	DOV	DAR	CLT	PIR	SON	NSH	CSC	ATL	NHA	POC	ROA	MCH	IRC	GLN	DAY	DAR	KAN	BRI	TEX	ROV	LVS	HOM	MAR	PHO	52nd	0
2024	B. J. McLeod	13	Chevy	DAY	ATL	LVS	PHO	COA	RCH	MAR	TEX	TAL	DOV	DAR	CLT	PIR	SON	IOW	NHA	NSH	CSC	POC	IND; 28	MCH	DAY	DAR	ATL										49th	6
2024	Kyle Keller	13	Ford																									GLN; DNQ	BRI	KAN	TAL	ROV	LVS	HOM	MAR	PHO	49th	6

=== Car No. 35 history ===
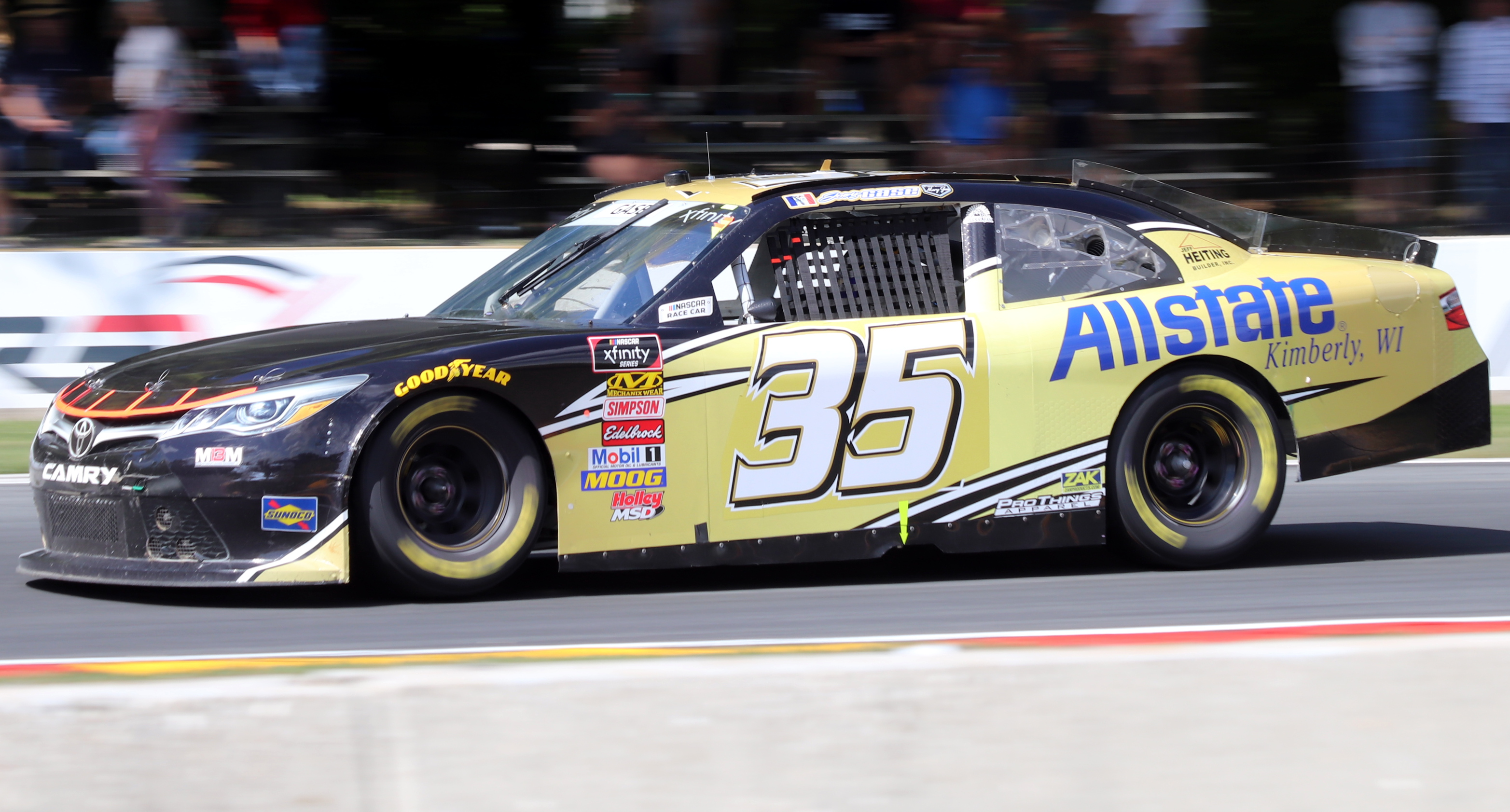
No. 35 in 2019

At the end of 2018, MBM Motorsports took over Go Green Racing's No. 35 team and driver Joey Gase. Gase had a best finish of sixteenth in the season opener at Daytona, then left at the end of the season to drive for Rick Ware Racing in the Cup Series.

==== Car No. 35 results ====
Year	Driver	No.	Make	1	2	3	4	5	6	7	8	9	10	11	12	13	14	15	16	17	18	19	20	21	22	23	24	25	26	27	28	29	30	31	32	33	Owners	Pts
2019	Joey Gase	35	Toyota	DAY; 16	ATL; 29	LVS; 38	PHO; 24	CAL; 27	TEX; 24	BRI; 27	RCH; 23	TAL; 37	DOV; 29	CLT; 21	POC; 33	MCH; 29	IOW; 33	CHI; 33	DAY; DNQ	KEN; 22	NHA; 31	IOW; 19	GLN; 34	MOH; 36	BRI; 20	ROA; 19	DAR; 25	IND; 18	LVS; 29	RCH; 20	CLT; 21	DOV; 22	KAN; 32	TEX; 26	PHO; 24	HOM; 27	30th	328

=== Car No. 40 history ===
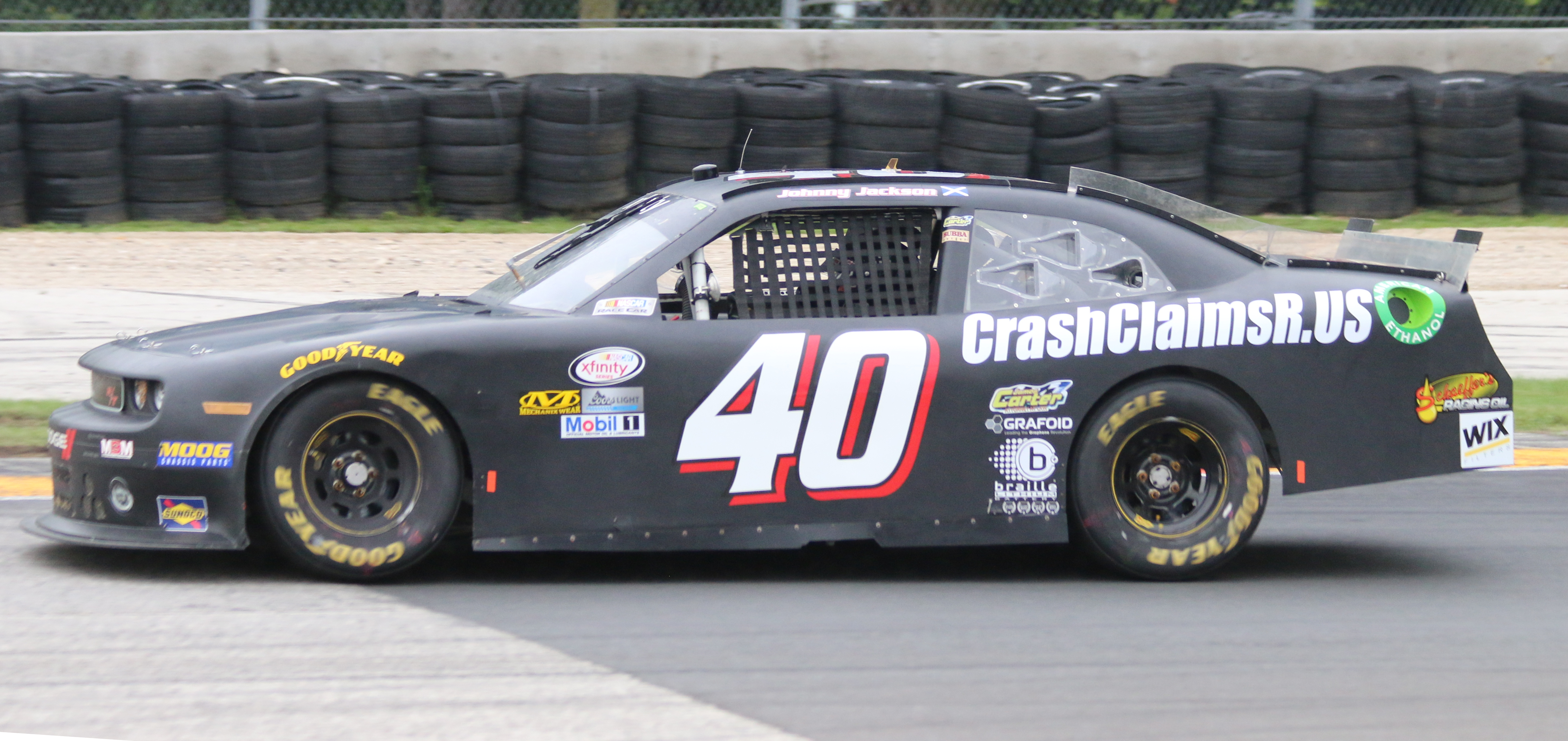
John Jackson's car at Road America in 2016

In 2015, White and Long were joined by team owners Rick Ware and Curtis Key as partners, and the team expanded to two full-time cars with the No. 40. Derek White debuted the car in the Alert Today Florida 300 at Daytona International Speedway, finishing 22nd. This team was fielded as a start and park team to help fund the team's No. 13 car.

The team returned in 2016, once again filling a start and park role. NASCAR Next driver Alon Day made his Xfinity Series debut with the team at Mid-Ohio Sports Car Course. Despite initial plans to drive the No. 13, he was moved to the No. 40 for the race. Day, the first Israeli driver to run a NASCAR national series race, qualified 22nd and took advantage of rainy conditions to begin running in the top-ten. He finished thirteenth, the best finish for the No. 40 team since a 30th-place run at Talladega.

In May 2017, Camping World Truck Series driver Austin Wayne Self joined the No. 40 for his Xfinity debut at Charlotte Motor Speedway. However, Long took over the No. 40 ride for the race, delaying Self's debut. At the June Dover Motor Speedway race, the No. 40 was driven by K&N Pro Series East driver Chad Finchum in his first NXS race.

Finchum became the full-time driver of the No. 40 in 2018. Team owner Carl Long took over the No. 40 at Homestead to race MBM's final Dodge in the fleet.

==== Car No. 40 results ====
Year	Driver	No.	Make	1	2	3	4	5	6	7	8	9	10	11	12	13	14	15	16	17	18	19	20	21	22	23	24	25	26	27	28	29	30	31	32	33	Owners	Pts
2015	Derek White	40	Dodge	DAY; 22			PHO; 39		TEX; 39	BRI; 40		TAL; 26						DAY; DNQ								ROA; 38			CHI; 37								39th	204
2015	Carl Long	40	Toyota		ATL; 39								IOW; 40		DOV; 38																						39th	204
2015	Carl Long	40	Dodge			LVS; 36		CAL; 39			RCH; 37					MCH; 38									BRI; 39		DAR; 39	RCH; 36							PHO; 39		39th	204
2015	Carl Long	40	Chevy																												DOV; 39						39th	204
2015	Timmy Hill	40	Toyota											CLT; 39																							39th	204
2015	Timmy Hill	40	Chevy																													CLT; 39	KAN; 37				39th	204
2015	John Jackson	40	Dodge														CHI; 38													KEN; 38							39th	204
2015	Josh Reaume	40	Dodge																KEN; 37	NHA; 38	IND; 39	IOW; 39		MOH; 39										TEX; 37			39th	204
2015	Josh Reaume	40	Chevy																																	HOM; 31	39th	204
2015	T. J. Bell	40	Toyota																				GLN; QL^{†}														39th	204
2015	Morgan Shepherd	40	Chevy																				GLN; 38														39th	204
2016	Derek White	40	Dodge	DAY; DNQ																																	43rd	116
2016	Carl Long	40	Toyota		ATL; 36	LVS; 37							DOV; 34		POC; 38		IOW; 38			NHA; 38																	43rd	116
2016	Carl Long	40	Dodge						TEX; 39	BRI; DNQ	RCH; 38	TAL; 30						DAY; DNQ											CHI; 38								43rd	116
2016	Josh Reaume	40	Toyota				PHO; DNQ																														43rd	116
2016	Josh Wise	40	Toyota					CAL; 39																													43rd	116
2016	T. J. Bell	40	Dodge											CLT; DNQ																							43rd	116
2016	John Jackson	40	Toyota													MCH; 37			KEN; 39																		43rd	116
2016	John Jackson	40	Dodge																							ROA; 35											43rd	116
2016	John Jackson	40	Chevy																											KEN; 39							43rd	116
2016	Timmy Hill	40	Dodge																		IND; 39							RCH; 39									43rd	116
2016	Timmy Hill	40	Toyota																			IOW; 37			BRI; DNQ		DAR; 36					CLT; 40	KAN; 40	TEX; 38	PHO; 39	HOM; 39	43rd	116
2016	Timmy Hill	40	Chevy																												DOV; 38						43rd	116
2016	Chris Cook	40	Dodge																				GLN; 40														43rd	116
2016	Alon Day	40	Dodge																					MOH; 13													43rd	116
2017	Brandon Hightower	40	Toyota	DAY; 13																																	37th	251
2017	Brandon Hightower	40	Dodge					CAL; 38																													37th	251
2017	Timmy Hill	40	Toyota		ATL; 33	LVS; 33																															37th	251
2017	Timmy Hill	40	Dodge				PHO; 26			BRI; 24		TAL; 17					IOW; 28	DAY; 17		NHA; 28							DAR; 32										37th	251
2017	Timmy Hill	40	Chevy						TEX; 31		RCH; 28				POC; 30																			TEX; 30	PHO; 28		37th	251
2017	Carl Long	40	Dodge										CLT; 39																								37th	251
2017	Chad Finchum	40	Chevy											DOV; 34					KEN; 29						BRI; 28						DOV; 36						37th	251
2017	Chad Finchum	40	Dodge																		IND; 32																37th	251
2017	Chad Finchum	40	Toyota																													CLT; 29				HOM; 30	37th	251
2017	Josh Bilicki	40	Chevy													MCH; 27																					37th	251
2017	Stan Mullis	40	Chevy																			IOW; 32															37th	251
2017	Enrique Baca	40	Toyota																				GLN; 31														37th	251
2017	Tim Cowen	40	Ford																					MOH; 20													37th	251
2017	Tim Cowen	40	Dodge																							ROA; 36											37th	251
2017	Bobby Dale Earnhardt	40	Chevy																									RCH; 34					KAN; 31				37th	251
2017	Garrett Smithley	40	Toyota																										CHI; 37								37th	251
2017	John Jackson	40	Chevy																											KEN; 35							37th	251
2018	Chad Finchum	40	Toyota	DAY; 28	ATL; 35	LVS; 32	PHO; 36	CAL; 36	TEX; 34	BRI; 36	RCH; 34	TAL; 39	DOV; 25	CLT; DNQ	POC; 30	MCH; 29	IOW; 26	CHI; 38	DAY; 14	KEN; 31	NHA; 21	IOW; 37	GLN; 29	MOH; 29	BRI; 30	ROA; 22		IND; 21	LVS; 25	RCH; 26		DOV; 34	KAN; 16	TEX; 17	PHO; 37		34th	251
2018	Chad Finchum	40	Chevy																								DAR; 32										34th	251
2018	Chad Finchum	40	Dodge																												CLT; 28						34th	251
2018	Carl Long	40	Dodge																																	HOM; 33	34th	251

=== Car No. 42 history ===
In 2019, MBM fielded the No. 42 car, following MBM's purchase of the defunct Chip Ganassi Racing No. 42 points.

In 2021, Chad Finchum ran the No. 42 car at the Tennessee Lottery 250 but failed to qualify. Timmy Hill would attempt to qualify this car in the Henry 180. Later on, Whelen Euro series driver from Switzerland Giorgio Maggi attempted the Pennzoil 150 but failed to qualify.

==== Car No. 42 results ====
Year	Driver	No.	Make	1	2	3	4	5	6	7	8	9	10	11	12	13	14	15	16	17	18	19	20	21	22	23	24	25	26	27	28	29	30	31	32	33	Owners	Pts
2019	John Jackson	42	Toyota	DAY; 32																																	29th	372
2019	Chad Finchum	42	Toyota		ATL; 26	LVS; 21	PHO; 19	CAL; 32	TEX; 23	BRI; 20	RCH; 34		DOV; 30	CLT; 38	POC; 37	MCH; 22	IOW; 21	CHI; 24	DAY; 27	KEN; 28	NHA; 30	IOW; 32															29th	372
2019	Max Tullman	42	Toyota									TAL; 20																									29th	372
2019	Stanton Barrett	42	Toyota																				GLN; 23														29th	372
2019	Timmy Hill	42	Toyota																					MOH; 25	BRI	ROA	DAR	IND	LVS	RCH	CLT	DOV	KAN	TEX	PHO	HOM	29th	372
2021	Chad Finchum	42	Toyota	DAY	DAY	HOM	LVS	PHO	ATL	MAR	TAL	DAR	DOV	COA	CLT	MOH	TEX	NSH; DNQ	POC																		45th	17
2021	Timmy Hill	42	Toyota																	ROA; 20	ATL	NHA	GLN														45th	17
2021	Giorgio Maggi	42	Toyota																					IND; DNQ	MCH	DAY	DAR	RCH	BRI	LVS	TAL	CLT	TEX	KAN	MAR	PHO	45th	17

=== Car No. 61 history ===
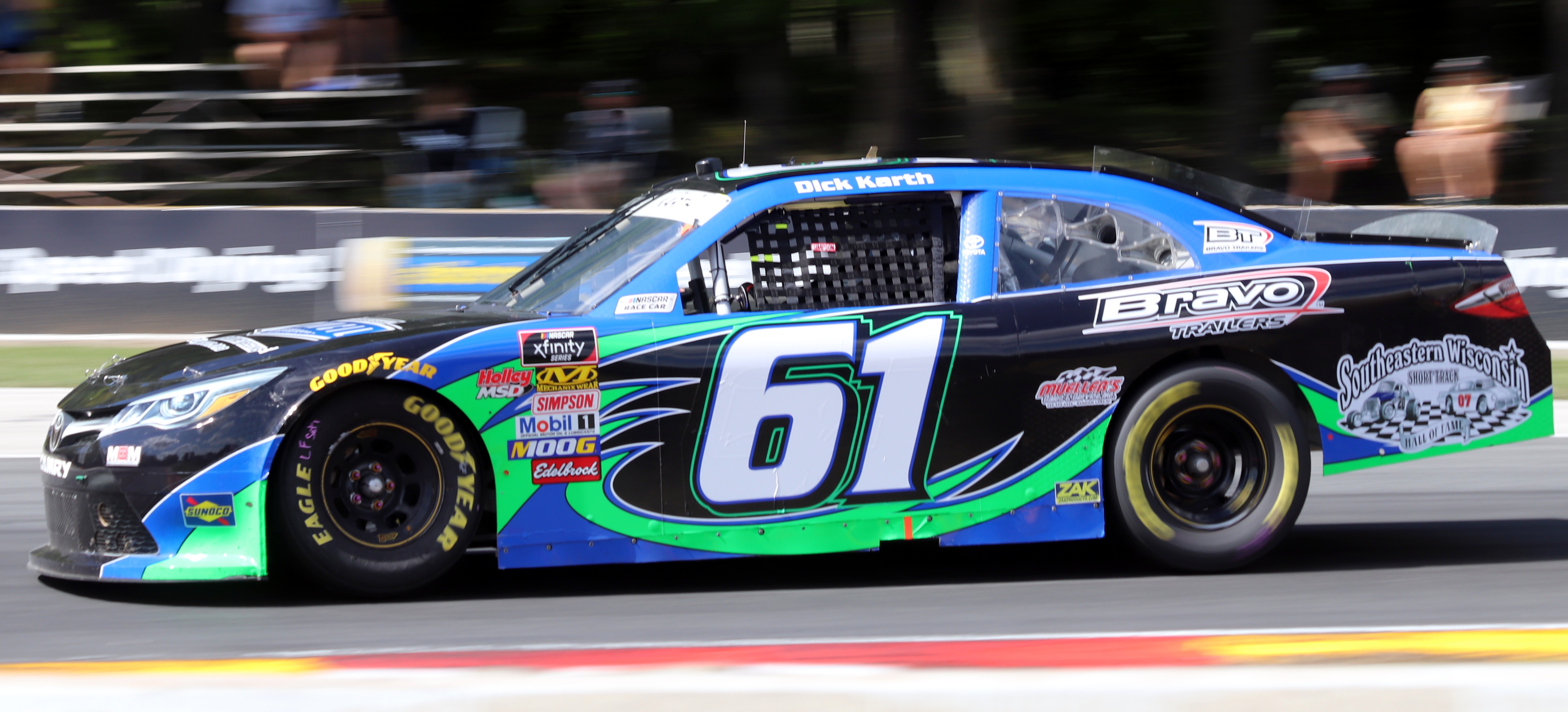
Dick Karth at Road America in 2019.

In the Food City 300 at Bristol, the No. 42 car was renumbered to No. 61 in a partnership with Hattori Racing Enterprises; Timmy Hill drove the No. 61 to a career-best seventh.

In 2020, Timmy Hill drove most races in the No. 61, with Austin Hill and Finchum returning. At Kansas, Austin Hill earned another top-five finish, finishing fifth.

In 2021, Robby Lyons, Stephen Leicht, and Chad Finchum drove for the first four races of the season. At Phoenix, David Starr moved from the 13 to the 61 to run most races. Austin Hill drove for five races. Matt Jaskol, Boris Said, C. J. McLaughlin, Bubba Wallace, Loris Hezemans, and Timmy Hill drove the 61 for one race. The 61 did not return in 2022.

==== Car No. 61 results ====
Year	Driver	No.	Make	1	2	3	4	5	6	7	8	9	10	11	12	13	14	15	16	17	18	19	20	21	22	23	24	25	26	27	28	29	30	31	32	33	Owners	Pts
2019	Timmy Hill	61	Toyota	DAY	ATL	LVS	PHO	CAL	TEX	BRI	RCH	TAL	DOV	CLT	POC	MCH	IOW	CHI	DAY	KEN	NHA	IOW	GLN	MOH	BRI; 7												29th	372
2019	Dick Karth	61	Toyota																							ROA; 30											29th	372
2019	Chad Finchum	61	Toyota																								DAR; 30			RCH; 26		DOV; 31	KAN; 26	TEX; 15		HOM; 35	29th	372
2019	Austin Hill	61	Toyota																									IND; 9									29th	372
2019	Tommy Joe Martins	61	Toyota																										LVS; 25		CLT; 35				PHO; 17		29th	372
2020	Austin Hill	61	Toyota	DAY; 35		CAL; 16			CLT; 33																	DAR; 9				LVS; 17	TAL; 33	CLT; 36	KAN; 5	TEX; 33			23rd	439
2020	Timmy Hill	61	Toyota		LVS; 26		PHO; 23	DAR; 22		BRI; 14	ATL; 33	HOM; 23	HOM; 25	TAL; 26	POC; 8		KEN; 21	KEN; 26	TEX; 17	KAN; 19					DAY; 22												23rd	439
2020	Stephen Leicht	61	Toyota													IND; 21					ROA; 22	DAY; 21	DOV; 22	DOV; 31													23rd	439
2020	Chad Finchum	61	Toyota																								RCH; 37	RCH; 28	BRI; 20						MAR; 37		23rd	439
2020	J. J. Yeley	61	Toyota																																	PHO; 26	23rd	439
2021	Robby Lyons	61	Toyota	DAY; 25																																	36th	325
2021	Stephen Leicht	61	Toyota		DAY; 29									COA; DNQ									GLN; 28					RCH; 38							MAR; 21		36th	325
2021	Chad Finchum	61	Toyota			HOM; 23	LVS; 28																						BRI; 33								36th	325
2021	David Starr	61	Toyota					PHO; 28	ATL; 27	MAR; 22	TAL; 16	DAR; 17	DOV; 40		CLT; DNQ	MOH; 36					ATL; 40					DAY; 14	DAR; 30			LVS; 21	TAL; 40						36th	325
2021	Matt Jaskol	61	Toyota														TEX; 27																				36th	325
2021	Austin Hill	61	Toyota															NSH; 9	POC; 25					IND; 29								CLT; 18	TEX; 20				36th	325
2021	Boris Said	61	Toyota																	ROA; DNQ																	36th	325
2021	C. J. McLaughlin	61	Toyota																			NHA; 37															36th	325
2021	Bubba Wallace	61	Toyota																						MCH; 10												36th	325
2021	Loris Hezemans	61	Toyota																															KAN; 32			36th	325
2021	Timmy Hill	61	Toyota																																	PHO; DNQ	36th	325

=== Car No. 66 history ===
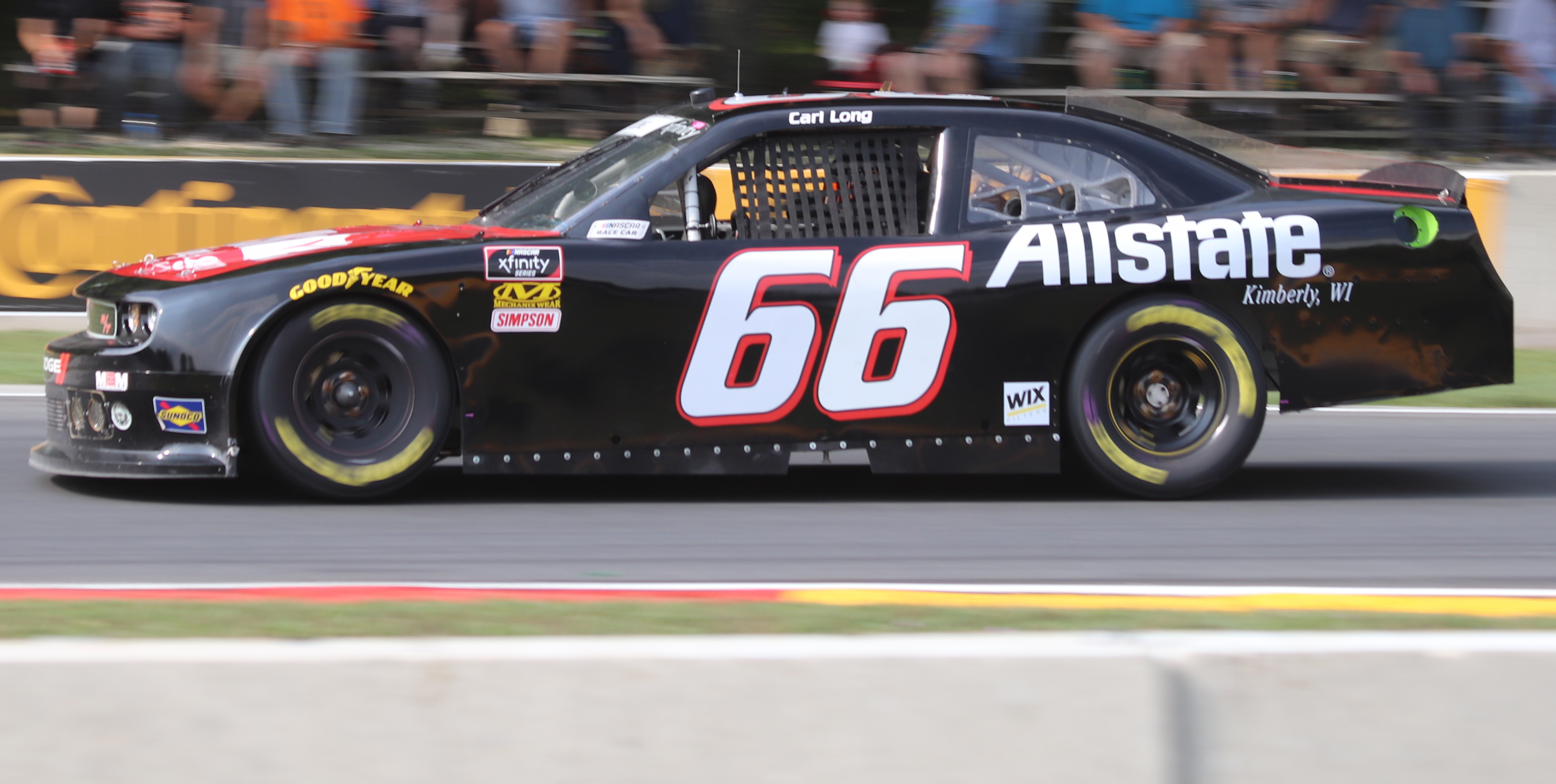
Carl Long driving the No. 66 at Road America in 2018.

The team began fielding the No. 66 at the start of the 2018 season, with Timmy Hill driving. At the 2018 Coca-Cola Firecracker 250, Hill finished seventh, his best finish since 2012. Chad Finchum, who usually ran the No. 40, switched to No. 66 at Homestead, as Long was in the No. 40.

In 2020, Hill kicked off the season with a thrd-place finish at Daytona. Hill also got two other top-twenty finishes, at Talladega and Charlotte Roval.

In 2021, Hill was announced to drive the No. 66 full-time. However, Matt Jaskol drove for 4 races, David Starr for 11 races, C. J. McLaughlin for one race, Jason White for two superspeedway races, and Loris Hezemans for one race.

In 2022, Timmy Hill was originally going to return to the No. 66 for Daytona, but J. J. Yeley had more sponsorship. He had continued for the following few races. Later on, in a Twitter post, MBM announced that J. J. Yeley would drive the No. 66 full-time.

In 2023, Dexter Stacey announced that he would return to the Xfinity Series with MBM to run the season opener. He would also run at Talladega after failing to qualify at Daytona and make the race. Timmy Hill also attempted to qualify the No. 66 into nine races, making four of them. Other drivers to run the No. 66 in 2023 were Mason Maggio, Caesar Bacarella, Cameron Lawrence, Chad Finchum, Mason Filippi, Sage Karam, Will Rodgers, Leland Honeyman Jr., Ryan Reed, and Ryan Newman.

In 2024, David Starr qualified into the Daytona field on speed, but was disqualified after he failed post-qualifying inspection. David Starr would return to the team to run at Talledega, finishing 24th. Chad Finchum would run the car at Texas with sponsorship from Cooper and Hunter electrical, but would finish 38th after suspension failure took him out early. Finchum would return at Dover with sponsorship from Garrison Homes but would DNQ. Then, it was announced the team would be switching to run the number 13, with the No. 66 the owner points switched with the first race in the 13 coming at Indianapolis.

MBM Motorsports continued fielding the No. 66 as a part-time entry in 2025, attempting a few races with drivers Tyler Tomassi and Mason Maggio. Tomassi would fail to qualify for his first two starts, attempting to debut in his first Xfinity Series race.

==== Car No. 66 results ====
Year	Driver	No.	Make	1	2	3	4	5	6	7	8	9	10	11	12	13	14	15	16	17	18	19	20	21	22	23	24	25	26	27	28	29	30	31	32	33	Owners	Pts
2018	Timmy Hill	66	Toyota	DAY; DNQ								TAL; 27							DAY; 7												CLT; 32						39th	158
2018	Timmy Hill	66	Dodge		ATL; 34	LVS; 33		CAL; 35	TEX; 36	BRI; 27	RCH; 38				POC; 39	MCH; 31				KEN; 37			GLN; 36						LVS; 34			DOV; 27					39th	158
2018	Timmy Hill	66	Chevy				PHO; 34							CLT; 30																							39th	158
2018	Carl Long	66	Dodge										DOV; 39													ROA; 32	DAR; 33			RCH; 36							39th	158
2018	Carl Long	66	Chevy																		NHA; 37				BRI; 33												39th	158
2018	Stan Mullis	66	Chevy														IOW; 33					IOW; 33															39th	158
2018	John Jackson	66	Dodge															CHI; 36																			39th	158
2018	Tim Cowen	66	Ford																					MOH; 26													39th	158
2018	Brandon Hightower	66	Dodge																									IND; 37									39th	158
2018	Bobby Dale Earnhardt	66	Toyota																														KAN; 27	TEX; 34			39th	158
2018	Akinori Ogata	66	Toyota																																PHO; 33		39th	158
2018	Chad Finchum	66	Toyota																																	HOM; 31	39th	158
2019	Timmy Hill	66	Toyota	DAY; 19	ATL; 28	LVS; 23		CAL; 34		BRI; 17		TAL; 29	DOV; 16	CLT; 35	POC; 19			CHI; 34	DAY; 20	KEN; 37	NHA; 34						DAR; 23				CLT; 18	DOV; 27					33rd	293
2019	Tyler Hill	66	Toyota				PHO; 20		TEX; 28							MCH; 35																					33rd	293
2019	Colin Garrett	66	Toyota								RCH; 26																										33rd	293
2019	Stan Mullis	66	Toyota														IOW; 28					IOW; 23															33rd	293
2019	Tommy Joe Martins	66	Toyota																				GLN; 28	MOH; 18		ROA; 25		IND; 24									33rd	293
2019	Chad Finchum	66	Toyota																						BRI; DNQ				LVS; 34								33rd	293
2019	Mike Marlar	66	Toyota																											RCH; 38							33rd	293
2019	Bobby Dale Earnhardt	66	Toyota																														KAN; 31	TEX; 37	PHO; 28	HOM; DNQ	33rd	293
2020	Timmy Hill	66	Toyota	DAY; 3					CLT; 34														DOV; 36	DOV; 34			RCH; 36	RCH; 36			TAL; 14	CLT; 19					39th	83
2020	Stephen Leicht	66	Toyota		LVS; 34	CAL; 35	PHO; 33	DAR; 39		BRI; 34	ATL; 36	HOM; 36	HOM; 38		POC; 27		KEN; 35	KEN; 34	TEX; 35	KAN; 37						DAR; 35			BRI; 36				KAN; 35				39th	83
2020	John Jackson	66	Toyota											TAL; 39											DAY; 35												39th	83
2020	Chad Finchum	66	Toyota													IND; 27					ROA; 36									LVS; 35				TEX; 34			39th	83
2020	Harold Crooms	66	Toyota																			DAY; 35															39th	83
2020	Carl Long	66	Toyota																																MAR; 32		39th	83
2020	Stan Mullis	66	Toyota																																	PHO; 28	39th	83
2021	Timmy Hill	66	Ford	DAY; 20							TAL; 13	DAR; 23															DAR; 36										35th	327
2021	Timmy Hill	66	Toyota		DAY; 34	HOM; 16	LVS; 37	PHO; 14	ATL; 20	MAR; 30			DOV; 30	COA; 33	CLT; 34																						35th	327
2021	Timmy Hill	66	Chevy																				GLN; 29														35th	327
2021	Matt Jaskol	66	Toyota													MOH; 19				ROA; DNQ				IND; DNQ						LVS; 27							35th	327
2021	David Starr	66	Toyota														TEX; 20	NSH; 24	POC; 33			NHA; 20			MCH; 22			RCH; 28	BRI; 30				TEX; 34		MAR; 24	PHO; 21	35th	327
2021	David Starr	66	Ford																															KAN; 36			35th	327
2021	C. J. McLaughlin	66	Ford																		ATL; 37																35th	327
2021	Jason White	66	Ford																							DAY; 15					TAL; 28						35th	327
2021	Loris Hezemans	66	Toyota																													CLT; 35					35th	327
2022	J. J. Yeley	66	Chevy	DAY; 13								TAL; 36														DAY; 9					TAL; 18						32nd	369
2022	J. J. Yeley	66	Toyota		CAL; 22				COA; 29		MAR; 31		DOV; 23				PIR; 8		ROA; DNQ		NHA; 23		IND; DNQ				DAR; 32		BRI; 33			CLT; 19	LVS; 36		MAR; 34		32nd	369
2022	J. J. Yeley	66	Ford			LVS; 20	PHO; 25	ATL; 11		RCH; 32				DAR; 25	TEX; 31	CLT; 18				ATL; 36		POC; 28		MCH; 20				KAN; 22		TEX; 34				HOM; 38		PHO; 30	32nd	369
2022	Natalie Decker	66	Toyota															NSH; 32																			32nd	369
2022	Timmy Hill	66	Chevy																						GLN; 14												32nd	369
2023	Dexter Stacey	66	Chevy	DAY; DNQ								TAL; 35																									39th	114
2023	Dexter Stacey	66	Toyota																CSC; DNQ				ROA; 25														39th	114
2023	Timmy Hill	66	Ford		CAL; 32		PHO; DNQ						DOV; 30															DAR; 32								PHO; 30	39th	114
2023	Timmy Hill	66	Toyota												CLT; DNQ							POC; DNQ								BRI; 38					MAR; DNQ		39th	114
2023	Mason Maggio	66	Ford			LVS; DNQ																															39th	114
2023	Mason Maggio	66	Toyota							RCH; 31						PIR; 36																					39th	114
2023	Caesar Bacarella	66	Chevy					ATL; 38																													39th	114
2023	Cameron Lawrence	66	Toyota						COA; DNQ																												39th	114
2023	Chad Finchum	66	Ford								MAR; DNQ			DAR; DNQ				NSH; DNQ			NHA; 35																39th	114
2023	Chad Finchum	66	Toyota																	ATL; Wth																	39th	114
2023	Mason Filippi	66	Ford														SON; DNQ																				39th	114
2023	Sage Karam	66	Ford																					MCH; 25							TEX; 23	ROV; 27					39th	114
2023	Will Rodgers	66	Toyota																						IRC; DNQ	GLN	DAY										39th	114
2023	Leland Honeyman	66	Ford																										KAN; 26								39th	114
2023	Ryan Reed	66	Chevy																														LVS; 20				39th	114
2023	Ryan Newman	66	Ford																															HOM; 38			39th	114
2024	David Starr	66	Chevy	DAY; DNQ	ATL	LVS	PHO	COA	RCH	MAR		TAL; 24																										
2024	Chad Finchum	66	Ford								TEX; 38		DOV; DNQ	DAR	CLT	PIR	SON	IOW	NHA; Wth	NSH	CSC	POC	IND	MCH	DAY	DAR	ATL	GLN	BRI	KAN	TAL	ROV	LVS	HOM	MAR	PHO		
2025	Tyler Tomassi	66	Ford	DAY	ATL	COA	PHO	LVS	HOM	MAR; DNQ	DAR	BRI; DNQ	CAR																								46th	15
2025	Mason Maggio	66	Chevy											TAL; 22	TEX	CLT	NSH	MXC	POC	ATL	CSC	SON	DOV	IND	IOW	GLN	DAY	PIR	GTW	BRI	KAN	ROV	LVS	TAL	MAR	PHO	46th	15

=== Car No. 72 history ===
The No. 72 car was fielded as a start and park team to help fund the team's No. 13 car in the team's early stages. After a one-year hiatus, the team made its first attempt at the 2016 Darlington race. John Jackson raced the No. 72 at Darlington, finishing 39th. Timmy Hill attempted to get the car into the fall Kentucky race, but failed to qualify and took over the No. 13 for Mark Thompson. The team returned for two races in 2017, once again running as a start and park entry.

==== Car No. 72 results ====
Year	Driver	No.	Make	1	2	3	4	5	6	7	8	9	10	11	12	13	14	15	16	17	18	19	20	21	22	23	24	25	26	27	28	29	30	31	32	33	Owners	Pts
2014	Matt Carter	72	Chevy	DAY	PHO	LVS	BRI	CAL	TEX	DAR	RCH	TAL	IOW	CLT	DOV	MCH; 37	ROA	KEN; Wth	DAY														CLT; DNQ	TEX	PHO		48th	57
2014	Harrison Rhodes	72	Chevy																	NHA; 37										KEN; 35	DOV; 36						48th	57
2014	Carl Long	72	Chevy																		CHI; 35	IND; 37										KAN; 35					48th	57
2014	John Jackson	72	Chevy																				IOW; 37	GLN	MOH	BRI; Wth	ATL; 38	RCH; 35	CHI; DNQ							HOM; DNQ	48th	57
2016	John Jackson	72	Chevy	DAY	ATL	LVS	PHO	CAL	TEX	BRI	RCH	TAL	DOV	CLT	POC	MCH	IOW	DAY	KEN	NHA	IND	IOW	GLN	MOH	BRI	ROA	DAR; 39	RCH	CHI								56th	0
2016	Timmy Hill	72	Dodge																											KEN; DNQ	DOV	CLT	KAN	TEX	PHO	HOM	56th	0
2017	John Jackson	72	Dodge	DAY	ATL	LVS	PHO	CAL	TEX	BRI	RCH	TAL	CLT	DOV	POC	MCH	IOW	DAY	KEN	NHA; 40	IND	IOW	GLN	MOH	BRI	ROA	DAR	RCH	CHI								55th	2
2017	Carl Long	72	Toyota																											KEN; 39	DOV	CLT	KAN	TEX	PHO	HOM	55th	2
2018	Timmy Hill	72	Toyota	DAY	ATL	LVS	PHO	CAL	TEX	BRI	RCH	TAL	DOV	CLT	POC	MCH	IOW	CHI	DAY	KEN	NHA	IOW	GLN	MOH	BRI	ROA	DAR; 35	IND									53rd	3
2018	John Jackson	72	Toyota																										LVS; 38	RCH	CLT	DOV	KAN	TEX	PHO	HOM	53rd	3

== Craftsman Truck Series ==
=== Truck No. 67 history ===
In 2024, MBM fielded the No. 67 truck for Jeffrey Earnhardt at Charlotte. They would be involved in a wreck early and finish 36th, but be promoted to 35th after second-place finisher Corey Heim was disqualified post-race.

==== Truck No. 67 results ====
Year	Driver	No.	Make	1	2	3	4	5	6	7	8	9	10	11	12	13	14	15	16	17	18	19	20	21	22	23	Owners	Pts
2024	Jeffrey Earnhardt	67	Toyota	DAY	ATL	LVS	BRI	COA	MAR	TEX	KAN	DAR	NWS	CLT; 35	GTW	NSH	POC	IRP	RCH	MLW	BRI	KAN	TAL	HOM	MAR	PHO	50th	2

=== Truck No. 69 history ===
In 2025, MBM fielded the No. 69 truck part-time for Tyler Tomassi and Derek White. Tomassi's first start would be at Pocono, where he finished 24th. Casey Mears made his truck series debut in the No. 69 at Martinsville.

In 2026, Tomassi ran the No. 69 Ford at Daytona, where failed to qualify. He finished 29th at Atlanta. He would also drive the No. 69 at Martinsville. White drove the No. 69 at St. Petersburg to a 35th place finish. At New Hampshire, he failed to qualify for the race. Jonathan Shafer drove the No. 69 at Rockingham and Nashville in a Ford, while at IRP, he drove a RAM. Shafer failed to qualify at all three races; furthermore, the team was docked 25 driver and owner points and fined US$5,000 for a safety violation regarding the shift boot of the truck at IRP. Dystany Spurlock failed to qualify at Watkins Glen with the No. 69 Toyota. At Dover, she drove a Ford to 36th place.

==== Truck No. 69 results ====
Year	Driver	No.	Make	1	2	3	4	5	6	7	8	9	10	11	12	13	14	15	16	17	18	19	20	21	22	23	24	25	Owners	Pts
2025	Tyler Tomassi	69	Ford	DAY	ATL	LVS	HOM	MAR	BRI	CAR	TEX	KAN	NWS	CLT	NSH	MCH	POC; 24	LRP	IRP						ROV; 29	TAL; 27			37th	69
2025	Derek White	69	Ford																	GLN; 19	RCH	DAR	BRI	NHA; 30					37th	69
2025	Casey Mears	69	Ford																								MAR; 24	PHO	37th	69
2026	Tyler Tomassi	69	Ford	DAY; DNQ	ATL; 29																								50th	-5
2026	Tyler Tomassi	69	Ram																								MAR; 28	HOM	50th	-5
2026	Derek White	69	Ford			STP; 35	DAR																						50th	-5
2026	Derek White	69	Ram																		NHA; DNQ	BRI	KAN	CLT	PHO	TAL			50th	-5
2026	Jonathan Shafer	69	Ford					ROC; DNQ	BRI	TEX				NSH; DNQ	MCH	COR	LRP	NWS											50th	-5
2026	Jonathan Shafer	69	Ram																IRP; DNQ	RCH									50th	-5
2026	Dystany Spurlock	69	Toyota								GLN; DNQ																		50th	-5
2026	Dystany Spurlock	69	Ford									DOV; 36	CLT																50th	-5

=== Truck No. 82 history ===
In 2014, MBM fielded the No. 82 truck for Derek White at Homestead. White finished 27th.

==== Truck No. 82 results ====
Year	Driver	No.	Make	1	2	3	4	5	6	7	8	9	10	11	12	13	14	15	16	17	18	19	20	21	22	Owners	Pts
2014	Derek White	82	Chevy	DAY	MAR	KAN	CLT	DOV	TEX	GTW	KEN	IOW	ELD	POC	MCH	BRI	MSP	CHI	NHA	LVS	TAL	MAR	TEX	PHO	HOM; 27		

== ARCA Menards Series ==
=== Car No. 13 history ===
On February 2, 2024, it was announced that Armani Williams would drive the No. 13 car at Hard Rock Bet 200 at Daytona. He would finish 13th after a last lap crash.

==== Car No. 13 results ====
Year	Driver	No.	Make	1	2	3	4	5	6	7	8	9	10	11	12	13	14	15	16	17	18	19	20	Owners	Pts
2024	Armani Williams	13	Toyota	DAY; 13	PHO	TAL	DOV	KAN	CLT	IOW	MOH	BLN	IRP	SLM	ELK	MCH	ISF	MLW	DSF	GLN	BRI	KAN	TOL	87th	31

=== Car No. 66 history ===
On November 28, 2016, MBM announced plans for Mark Thompson to race at the 2017 season-opening Lucas Oil 200 ARCA Racing Series race at Daytona; the race was rumored to be Thompson's final ARCA start, but he returned for the Talladega event in May. Driving the No. 66 Phoenix Air Ford, Thompson qualified fifteenth, but finished 31st after he was collected in a nine-car accident on lap 49.

In 2018, Thompson returned and raced the No. 66 at the Lucas Oil 200, though he was taken out in a violent late-race crash.

In 2026, MBM fielded the No. 66 for Derek White at Daytona. He started 6th but finished 39th due to mechanical failure. Dystany Spurlock would make her ARCA Menards Series debut at Kansas in the No. 66.

==== Car No. 66 results ====
Year	Driver	No.	Make	1	2	3	4	5	6	7	8	9	10	11	12	13	14	15	16	17	18	19	20	Owners	Pts
2016	Mark Thompson	66	Toyota	DAY	NSH	SLM	TAL	TOL	NJE	POC	MCH	MAD	WIN	IOW	IRP	POC	BLN	ISF	DSF	SLM	CHI	KEN; 10	KAN	N/A	180
2017	Mark Thompson	66	Ford	DAY; 31	NSH	SLM	TAL; 31	TOL	ELK	POC	MCH	MAD	IOW	IRP	POC	WIN	ISF	ROA	DSF	SLM	CHI	KEN	KAN	N/A	145
2018	Mark Thompson	66	Ford	DAY; 27	NSH	SLM	TAL	TOL	CLT	POC	MCH	MAD	GTW	CHI	IOW	ELK	POC	ISF	BLN	DSF	SLM	IRP	KAN	N/A	95
2026	Derek White	66	Ford	DAY; 39	PHO		TAL; 15																	30th	165
2026	Dystany Spurlock	66	Ford			KAN; 10		GLN; 29	TOL		POC; 24	BER	ELK	CHI	LRP									30th	165
2026	Dystany Spurlock	66	Chevy							MCH; 13														30th	165
2026	Dystany Spurlock	66	Toyota													IRP; 13	IOW	ISF	MAD	DSF	SLM	BRI	KAN	30th	165

== ARCA Menards Series East ==
=== Car No. 66 history ===
On March 19, 2026, it was announced that Dystany Spurlock would make her debut in the ARCA Menards Series East driving the No. 66 at Hickory.

==== Car No. 66 results ====
Year	Driver	No.	Make	1	2	3	4	5	6	7	8	Owners	Pts
2026	Dystany Spurlock	66	Chevy	HCY; 7	ROC; 12	NSV	TOL					28th	100
2026	Dystany Spurlock	66	Toyota					IRP; 13	FRS	IOW	BRI	28th	100

== ARCA Menards Series West ==
=== Car No. 66 history ===
On October 9, 2026, it was announced that Dystany Spurlock would make her debut in the ARCA Menards Series West driving the No. 66 at Phoenix.

==== Car No. 66 results ====
Year	Driver	No.	Make	1	2	3	4	5	6	7	8	9	10	11	12	13	Owners	Pts
2026	Dystany Spurlock	66	Toyota	KER	PHO	TUC	SHA	CNS	TRI	SON	PIR	AAS	MAD	LVS	PHO; 14	KER	-*	-*
