= 2020 Bluegreen Vacations Duels =

Qualifying races for the 2020 Daytona 500

Race details
- Date: February 13, 2020
- Location: Daytona International Speedway; Daytona Beach, Florida
- Course: Permanent racing facility 2.5 mi (4 km)
- Distance: Race 1: 60 laps, 150 mi (240 km); Race 2: 60 laps, 150 mi (240 km)
- Avg Speed: Race 1: 166.105 miles per hour (267.320 km/h); Race 2: 170.994 miles per hour (275.188 km/h)

Race 1
- Pole position: Ricky Stenhouse Jr.
- Most laps led: Ricky Stenhouse Jr. (27)
- Winner: Joey Logano

Race 2
- Pole position: Alex Bowman
- Most laps led: Kevin Harvick (34)
- Winner: William Byron

Television
- Network: FS1 & MRN
- Announcers: Mike Joy and Jeff Gordon (Television); Alex Hayden, Jeff Striegle and Rusty Wallace (Booth); Dave Moody (1 & 2), Mike Bagley (Backstretch) and Kyle Rickey (3 & 4) (Turns) (Radio)
- Nielsen Ratings: 1.544 million

The 2020 Bluegreen Vacations Duels were a pair of NASCAR Cup Series stock car races held on February 13, 2020, at Daytona International Speedway in Daytona Beach, Florida. Both contested over 60 laps, they were the qualifying races for the 2020 Daytona 500.

== Report ==
=== Background ===
Daytona International Speedway, where the races will be held.

Daytona International Speedway is one of six superspeedways to hold NASCAR races, the others being Michigan International Speedway, Auto Club Speedway, Indianapolis Motor Speedway, Pocono Raceway and Talladega Superspeedway. The standard track at Daytona International Speedway is a four–turn superspeedway that is 2.5-mile (4.0 km) long. The track's turns are banked at 31 degrees, while the front stretch, the location of the finish line, is banked at 18 degrees.

== Qualifying ==
Ricky Stenhouse Jr. scored the pole for the race with a time of 46.253 and a speed of 194.582 mph (313.149 km/h).

=== Qualifying results ===
Pos	No.	Driver	Team	Manufacturer	Time
1	47	Ricky Stenhouse Jr.	JTG Daugherty Racing	Chevrolet	46.253
2	88	Alex Bowman	Hendrick Motorsports	Chevrolet	46.305
3	9	Chase Elliott	Hendrick Motorsports	Chevrolet	46.319
4	48	Jimmie Johnson	Hendrick Motorsports	Chevrolet	46.419
5	11	Denny Hamlin	Joe Gibbs Racing	Toyota	46.528
6	18	Kyle Busch	Joe Gibbs Racing	Toyota	46.662
7	10	Aric Almirola	Stewart-Haas Racing	Ford	46.732
8	24	William Byron	Hendrick Motorsports	Chevrolet	46.767
9	95	Christopher Bell (R)	Leavine Family Racing	Toyota	46.818
10	20	Erik Jones	Joe Gibbs Racing	Toyota	46.859
11	22	Joey Logano	Team Penske	Ford	46.867
12	4	Kevin Harvick	Stewart-Haas Racing	Ford	46.869
13	14	Clint Bowyer	Stewart-Haas Racing	Ford	46.906
14	41	Cole Custer (R)	Stewart-Haas Racing	Ford	46.921
15	6	Ryan Newman	Roush Fenway Racing	Ford	46.950
16	21	Matt DiBenedetto	Wood Brothers Racing	Ford	46.952
17	37	Ryan Preece	JTG Daugherty Racing	Chevrolet	46.969
18	8	Tyler Reddick (R)	Richard Childress Racing	Chevrolet	46.983
19	17	Chris Buescher	Roush Fenway Racing	Ford	46.984
20	42	Kyle Larson	Chip Ganassi Racing	Chevrolet	46.987
21	19	Martin Truex Jr.	Joe Gibbs Racing	Toyota	46.994
22	1	Kurt Busch	Chip Ganassi Racing	Chevrolet	47.052
23	2	Brad Keselowski	Team Penske	Ford	47.054
24	34	Michael McDowell	Front Row Motorsports	Ford	47.070
25	38	John Hunter Nemechek (R)	Front Row Motorsports	Ford	47.076
26	36	David Ragan	Rick Ware Racing	Ford	47.151
27	12	Ryan Blaney	Team Penske	Ford	47.205
28	77	Ross Chastain (i)	Spire Motorsports	Chevrolet	47.262
29	3	Austin Dillon	Richard Childress Racing	Chevrolet	47.273
30	13	Ty Dillon	Germain Racing	Chevrolet	47.353
31	16	Justin Haley (i)	Kaulig Racing	Chevrolet	47.364
32	43	Bubba Wallace	Richard Petty Motorsports	Chevrolet	47.491
33	62	Brendan Gaughan (i)	Beard Motorsports	Chevrolet	47.633
34	27	Reed Sorenson	Premium Motorsports	Chevrolet	48.037
35	66	Timmy Hill (i)	MBM Motorsports	Ford	48.225
36	96	Daniel Suárez	Gaunt Brothers Racing	Toyota	48.523
37	32	Corey LaJoie	Go Fas Racing	Ford	48.605
38	00	Quin Houff (R)	StarCom Racing	Chevrolet	48.943
39	54	J. J. Yeley (i)	Rick Ware Racing	Ford	49.102
40	15	Brennan Poole (R)	Premium Motorsports	Chevrolet	49.510
41	49	Chad Finchum (i)	MBM Motorsports	Toyota	49.515
42	51	Joey Gase (i)	Petty Ware Racing	Chevrolet	50.068
43	52	B. J. McLeod (i)	Rick Ware Racing	Ford	0.000
Official qualifying results

== Duels ==
=== Duel 1 ===
==== Duel 1 results ====
Pos	Grid	No	Driver	Team	Manufacturer	Laps	Points
1	6	22	Joey Logano	Team Penske	Ford	60	10
2	4	10	Aric Almirola	Stewart-Haas Racing	Ford	60	9
3	8	6	Ryan Newman	Roush Fenway Racing	Ford	60	8
4	12	2	Brad Keselowski	Team Penske	Ford	60	7
5	17	43	Bubba Wallace	Richard Petty Motorsports	Chevrolet	60	6
6	15	3	Austin Dillon	Richard Childress Racing	Chevrolet	60	5
7	11	19	Martin Truex Jr.	Joe Gibbs Racing	Toyota	60	4
8	1	47	Ricky Stenhouse Jr.	JTG Daugherty Racing	Chevrolet	60	3
9	5	95	Christopher Bell (R)	Leavine Family Racing	Toyota	60	2
10	10	17	Chris Buescher	Roush Fenway Racing	Ford	60	1
11	3	11	Denny Hamlin	Joe Gibbs Racing	Toyota	60	0
12	13	38	John Hunter Nemechek (R)	Front Row Motorsports	Ford	60	0
13	2	9	Chase Elliott	Hendrick Motorsports	Chevrolet	60	0
14	14	12	Ryan Blaney	Team Penske	Ford	60	0
15	7	14	Clint Bowyer	Stewart-Haas Racing	Ford	60	0
16	9	37	Ryan Preece	JTG Daugherty Racing	Chevrolet	60	0
17	16	16	Justin Haley (i)	Kaulig Racing	Chevrolet	60	0
18	18	27	Reed Sorenson	Premium Motorsports	Chevrolet	59	0
19	20	00	Quin Houff (R)	StarCom Racing	Chevrolet	58	0
20	21	49	Chad Finchum (i)	MBM Motorsports	Toyota	57	0
21	22	51	Joey Gase (i)	Petty Ware Racing	Chevrolet	57	0
22	19	96	Daniel Suárez	Gaunt Brothers Racing	Toyota	28	0
Official race results

=== Duel 2 ===
==== Duel 2 results ====
Pos	Grid	No	Driver	Team	Manufacturer	Laps	Points
1	4	24	William Byron	Hendrick Motorsports	Chevrolet	60	10
2	2	48	Jimmie Johnson	Hendrick Motorsports	Chevrolet	60	9
3	10	42	Kyle Larson	Chip Ganassi Racing	Chevrolet	60	8
4	6	4	Kevin Harvick	Stewart-Haas Racing	Ford	60	7
5	7	41	Cole Custer (R)	Stewart-Haas Racing	Ford	60	6
6	5	20	Erik Jones	Joe Gibbs Racing	Toyota	60	5
7	8	21	Matt DiBenedetto	Wood Brothers Racing	Ford	60	4
8	11	1	Kurt Busch	Chip Ganassi Racing	Chevrolet	60	3
9	14	77	Ross Chastain (i)	Spire Motorsports	Chevrolet	60	0
10	9	8	Tyler Reddick (R)	Richard Childress Racing	Chevrolet	60	1
11	15	13	Ty Dillon	Germain Racing	Chevrolet	60	0
12	12	34	Michael McDowell	Front Row Motorsports	Ford	60	0
13	3	18	Kyle Busch	Joe Gibbs Racing	Toyota	60	0
14	13	36	David Ragan	Rick Ware Racing	Ford	60	0
15	1	88	Alex Bowman	Hendrick Motorsports	Chevrolet	60	0
16	17	66	Timmy Hill (i)	MBM Motorsports	Ford	60	0
17	16	62	Brendan Gaughan (i)	Beard Motorsports	Chevrolet	60	0
18	20	15	Brennan Poole (R)	Premium Motorsports	Chevrolet	59	0
19	18	32	Corey LaJoie	Go Fas Racing	Ford	59	0
20	21	52	B. J. McLeod (i)	Rick Ware Racing	Ford	58	0
21	19	54	J. J. Yeley (i)	Rick Ware Racing	Ford	41	0
Official race results

== Media ==
=== Television ===
FS1
Booth announcers	Pit reporters
Lap-by-lap: Mike Joy; Color-commentator: Jeff Gordon	Jamie Little; Regan Smith; Vince Welch; Matt Yocum

=== Radio ===
MRN Radio
Booth announcers	Turn announcers	Pit reporters
Lead announcer: Alex Hayden; Announcer: Jeff Striegle; Announcer: Rusty Wallace	Turns 1 & 2: Dave Moody; Backstretch: Mike Bagley; Turns 3 & 4: Kyle Rickey	Winston Kelley; Steve Post; Dillon Welch; Kim Coon
