= Sonoma 250 =

Sonoma 250 can refer to two races:

- Pit Boss/FoodMaxx 250, NASCAR O'Reilly Auto Parts Series race at Sonoma Raceway
- DoorDash 250, former NASCAR Camping World Truck Series race at Sonoma Raceway
