= Pacific Office Automation 147 =

Former NASCAR Xfinity Series race at Portland International Raceway

NASCAR Xfinity Series
- Venue: Portland International Raceway
- Location: Portland, Oregon
- Corporate sponsor: Pacific Office Automation
- First race: 2022
- Last race: 2025
- Distance: 147.525 miles (237.418 km)
- Laps: 75; All 3 stages: 25 each
- Most wins (driver): A. J. Allmendinger; Cole Custer; Shane van Gisbergen; Connor Zilisch (1)
- Most wins (team): Kaulig Racing (2)
- Most wins (manufacturer): Chevrolet (3)

Circuit information
- Surface: Asphalt
- Length: 1.967 mi (3.166 km)
- Turns: 12

The Pacific Office Automation 147 was a NASCAR Xfinity Series race that was held at the Portland International Raceway road course in Portland, Oregon. Connor Zilisch was the final winner of the event.

== History ==
A NASCAR Camping World Truck Series race was previously held at this track in 1999 and 2000. The Xfinity Series race at Portland marked the first time since then that a NASCAR national series has had a race in the Pacific Northwest.

On September 18, 2021, Elizabeth Blackstock from Jalopnik reported that there were rumors of the track hosting an Xfinity Series race and a Truck Series race in 2022. On September 25, Jordan Bianchi from The Athletic reported that Portland would likely be on the 2022 Xfinity Series schedule. The schedule was released on September 29 with Portland on Saturday, June 4. It replaced the race at the Mid-Ohio Sports Car Course. Both the Mid-Ohio and Portland races were promoted Green Savoree Racing Promotions. Mid-Ohio was given a Truck Series race after losing their Xfinity Series date.

The race was 147 miles and 75 laps long according to NASCAR.com. Each of the stages will be 25 laps in length.

On April 19, 2022, the track announced that Pacific Office Automation, a company located in nearby Beaverton, Oregon that makes technology for office space, would be the title sponsor of the race.

The race was dropped from the schedule following the 2025 season.

== Past winners ==
Year	Date	No.	Driver	Team	Manufacturer	Race distance		Race time	Average speed (mph)	Report	Ref
Year	Date	No.	Driver	Team	Manufacturer	Laps	Miles (km)	Race time	Average speed (mph)	Report	Ref
2022	June 4	16	A. J. Allmendinger	Kaulig Racing	Chevrolet	75	147.525 miles (237.418 km)	3:01:21	48.883	Report	
2023	June 3	00	Cole Custer	Stewart–Haas Racing	Ford	77*	151.459 miles (243.750 km)	2:19:45	65.126	Report	
2024	June 1	97	Shane van Gisbergen	Kaulig Racing	Chevrolet	75	147.525 miles (237.418 km)	2:07:25	69.575	Report	
2025	August 30	88	Connor Zilisch	JR Motorsports	Chevrolet	78*	153.426 miles (246.915 km)	2:18:15	66.688	Report	

=== Notes ===
- 2023 and 2025: Races extended due to NASCAR overtime.

=== Multiple winners (teams) ===
# Wins	Make	Years won
2	Kaulig Racing	2022, 2024

=== Manufacturer wins ===
# Wins	Make	Years won
3	(United States) Chevrolet	2022, 2024–2025
1	(United States) Ford	2023
