= John Jackson (racing driver) =

Scottish racing driver (born 1964)

Johnny Jackson
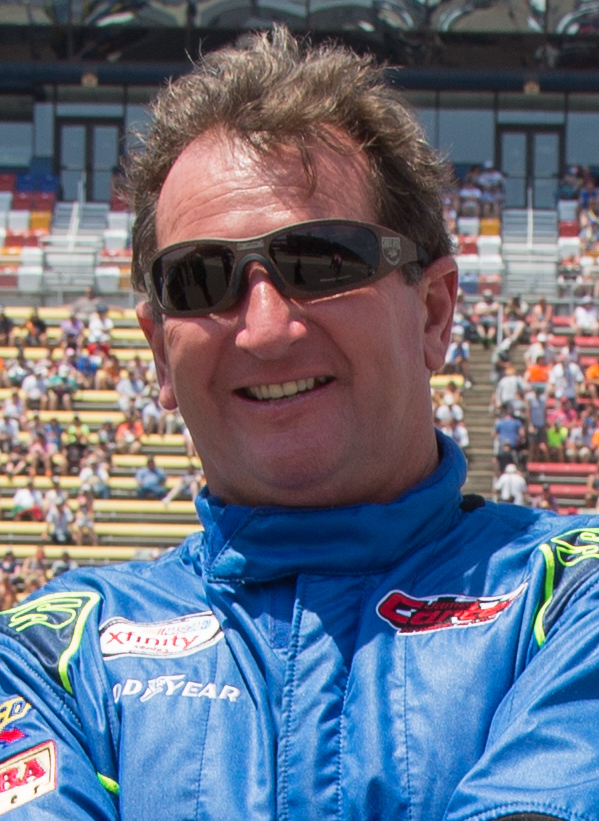
- Jackson at Michigan International Speedway in 2016
- Born: 13 February 1964 (age 62); Carluke, South Lanarkshire, Scotland

NASCAR O'Reilly Auto Parts Series career
- 37 races run over 9 years
- 2020 position: 71st
- Best finish: 61st (2015, 2016)
- First race: 2011 Royal Purple 200 (Darlington)
- Last race: 2020 Wawa 250 (Daytona)
Wins	Top tens	Poles
0	0	0

NASCAR FedEx Freight Truck Series career
- 10 races run over 2 years
- Best finish: 50th (2009)
- First race: 2009 North Carolina Education Lottery 200 (Charlotte)
- Last race: 2010 Ford 200 (Homestead)
Wins	Top tens	Poles
0	0	0
- Statistics up to date as of 9 November 2020.

John Jackson (born 13 February 1964) is a Scottish professional stock car racing driver. He last competed part-time in the NASCAR Xfinity Series, driving the No. 66 Toyota Camry for MBM Motorsports. He has also competed in other series, most notably the NASCAR Camping World Truck Series and the ARCA Racing Series.

== Racing career ==
=== ARCA Racing Series ===
Jackson made his ARCA debut at the 2006 Pocono 200 driving for Mario Gosselin. He started 22nd, but crashed and finished 30th. Jackson failed to qualify for two other ARCA races that season. His first start in 2007 came in the Construct Corps-Palm Beach Grading 250 at USA International Speedway, where he posted his best finish in ARCA, an eighth. Jackson made two more starts and failed to qualify for a race, posting a 34th at Kansas Speedway after a crash and a 20th at Chicagoland Speedway. He made one start in 2008, at Talladega Superspeedway. He finished 25th after a crash but led that number of laps. All five of his ARCA starts were for Gosselin.

In 2026, Jackson participated in the pre-season test for the series at Daytona International Speedway, driving the No. 66 for MBM Motorsports, where he set the 66th quickest time between the two sessions held.

=== NASCAR Camping World Truck Series ===
Jackson made his Truck debut in 2009 driving for Gosselin. He made five starts in the No. 72 Chevrolet Silverado, and one start in the No. 92. He also failed to qualify for two races in the 92. His best finish was a 28th at Texas Motor Speedway, and he did not finish a race running as a start and park team. In 2010, he started four races, with a best finish of 27th at Kentucky Speedway. That was the only race he finished, starting and parking at Darlington Raceway and Talladega, and crashing at Homestead-Miami Speedway. He also failed to qualify for one race with Dwayne Tatman.

=== NASCAR Xfinity Series ===
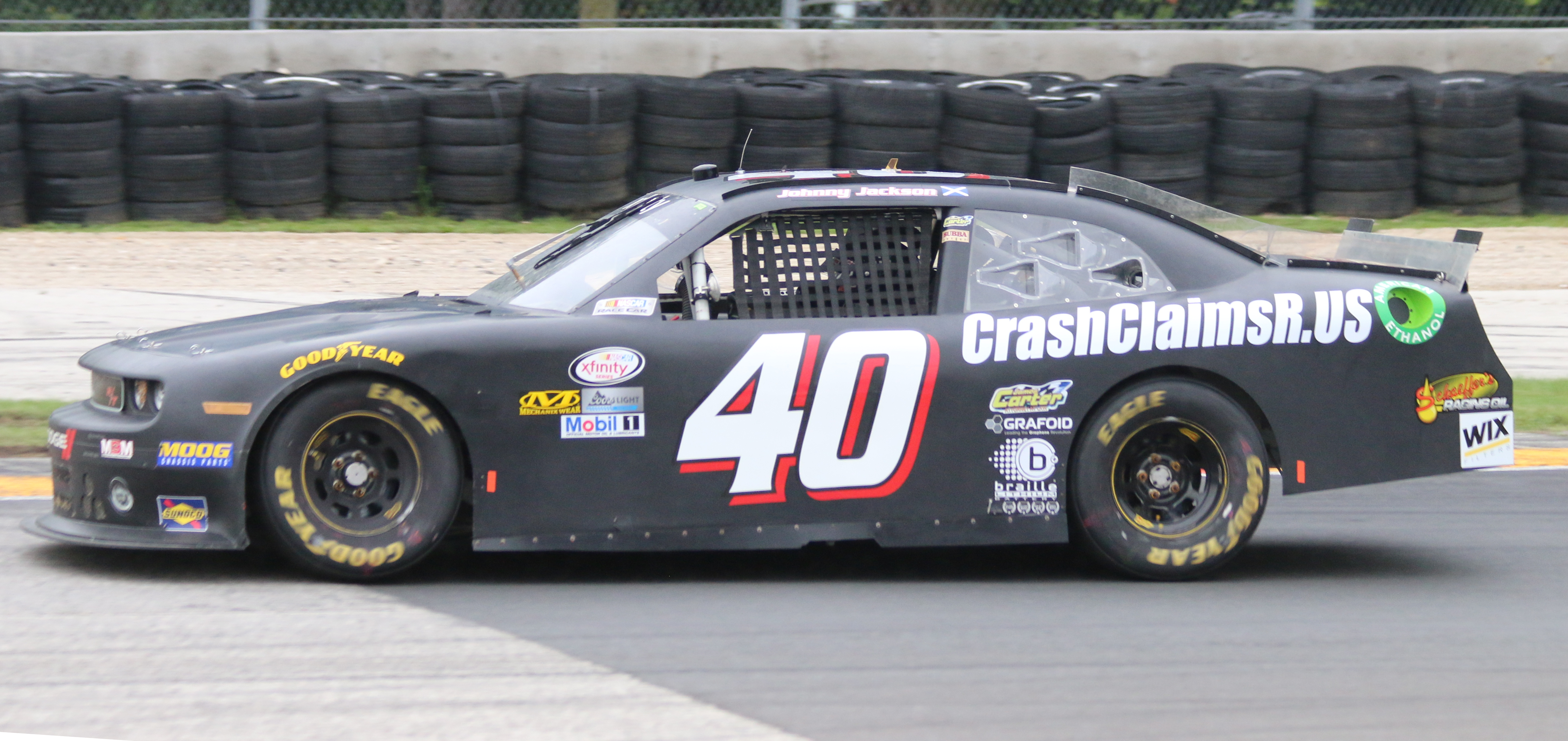
Jackson's car at Road America in 2016

In 2011, Jackson ran four races for James Carter, recording a best finish of 31st at Atlanta in the only race that he did not start and park. He also failed to qualify for two races. In 2012, he started and parked for two races, and failed to qualify for three more. In 2014, he ran three races for Carter and one for Jimmy Means. He also failed to qualify with three with Carter. His last race with Carter, at Richmond International Raceway, remains the last Xfinity start with No. 72 as of May 2016. In 2015, he ran a career-high five races, four with MBM Motorsports and one for Means. Again, he start-and-parked for all but one race, recording a 31st at Iowa Speedway with MBM. The race with Means remains the last Xfinity race run with No. 79 as of May 2016. In 2016, he made his debut at Talladega. Jackson ran six more races for MBM, becoming the first Scottish driver to finish last in an Xfinity race. The Talladega race is one of three races Jackson has finished in his Xfinity career. Jackson returned to MBM for one race in each of the team's three cars in 2017, failing to finish all three. He was also pulled off entry lists twice in the No. 72 machine.

== Motorsports career results ==
=== NASCAR ===
(key) (Bold – Pole position awarded by qualifying time. Italics – Pole position earned by points standings or practice time. * – Most laps led.)

==== Xfinity Series ====
NASCAR Xfinity Series results
Year	Team	No.	Make	1	2	3	4	5	6	7	8	9	10	11	12	13	14	15	16	17	18	19	20	21	22	23	24	25	26	27	28	29	30	31	32	33	34	NXSC	Pts	Ref
2011	James Carter Racing	72	Toyota	DAY	PHO	LVS	BRI	CAL	TEX	TAL	NSH	RCH	DAR; 40	DOV	IOW	CLT; 37	CHI	MCH	ROA	DAY	KEN; 42	NHA	NSH	IRP	IOW	GLN	CGV	BRI; DNQ	ATL; 31	RCH; DNQ	CHI	DOV	KAN	CLT	TEX	PHO	HOM	71st	22	
2012	James Carter Racing	72	Toyota	DAY	PHO	LVS	BRI	CAL; 42	TEX; DNQ	RCH	TAL	DAR	IOW; 36	CLT	DOV	MCH	ROA	KEN; DNQ	DAY	NHA	CHI	IND	IOW	GLN	CGV	BRI	ATL; DNQ	RCH	CHI	KEN	DOV	CLT	KAN	TEX	PHO	HOM		93rd	10	
2014	MBM Motorsports	72	Chevy	DAY	PHO	LVS	BRI	CAL	TEX	DAR	RCH	TAL	IOW	CLT	DOV	MCH	ROA	KEN	DAY	NHA	CHI	IND	IOW; 37	GLN			ATL; 38	RCH; 35	CHI; DNQ	KEN	DOV	KAN	CLT	TEX	PHO	HOM; DNQ		70th	15	
2014	Jimmy Means Racing	79	Chevy																						MOH; 34	BRI												70th	15	
2015	MBM Motorsports	13	Dodge	DAY	ATL	LVS	PHO	CAL	TEX	BRI	RCH	TAL	IOW; 31	CLT	DOV	MCH																						61st	33	
2015	MBM Motorsports	40	Dodge														CHI; 38	DAY	KEN	NHA	IND									KEN; 38	DOV	CLT	KAN	TEX	PHO	HOM		61st	33	
2015	MBM Motorsports	13	Chevy																			IOW; 36	GLN															61st	33	
2015	Jimmy Means Racing	79	Chevy																					MOH; 38	BRI	ROA	DAR	RCH	CHI									61st	33	
2016	MBM Motorsports	13	Toyota	DAY	ATL	LVS	PHO	CAL	TEX	BRI	RCH	TAL; 32	DOV	CLT	POC																							61st	24	
2016	MBM Motorsports	40	Toyota													MCH; 37	IOW	DAY	KEN; 39	NHA	IND																	61st	24	
2016	MBM Motorsports	13	Chevy																			IOW; 40	GLN	MOH	BRI													61st	24	
2016	MBM Motorsports	40	Dodge																							ROA; 35												61st	24	
2016	MBM Motorsports	72	Chevy																								DAR; 39	RCH	CHI									61st	24	
2016	MBM Motorsports	40	Chevy																											KEN; 39	DOV	CLT	KAN	TEX	PHO	HOM		61st	24	
2017	MBM Motorsports	72	Dodge	DAY	ATL	LVS	PHO	CAL	TEX	BRI	RCH	TAL	CLT	DOV	POC	MCH	IOW	DAY	KEN	NHA; 40	IND	IOW	GLN	MOH	BRI	ROA	DAR	RCH	CHI									79th	4	
2017	MBM Motorsports	40	Chevy																											KEN; 35	DOV	CLT	KAN					79th	4	
2017	MBM Motorsports	13	Dodge																															TEX; 40	PHO	HOM		79th	4	
2018	MBM Motorsports	66	Dodge	DAY	ATL	LVS	PHO	CAL	TEX	BRI	RCH	TAL	DOV	CLT	POC	MCH	IOW	CHI; 36	DAY	KEN	NHA	IOW	GLN															80th	4	
2018	MBM Motorsports	13	Dodge																					MOH; 35	BRI	ROA	DAR	IND										80th	4	
2018	MBM Motorsports	72	Toyota																										LVS; 38	RCH	CLT	DOV	KAN	TEX	PHO	HOM		80th	4	
2019	MBM Motorsports	42	Toyota	DAY; 32																																		64th	27	
2019	MBM Motorsports	13	Toyota		ATL; 37	LVS	PHO	CAL; 30	TEX	BRI; 37	RCH	TAL	DOV; 37	CLT	POC; 31	MCH	IOW	CHI	DAY	KEN; 31	NHA	IOW	GLN	MOH	BRI	ROA	DAR	IND	LVS	RCH	CLT	DOV	KAN	TEX	PHO	HOM		64th	27	
2020	MBM Motorsports	66	Toyota	DAY	LVS	CAL	PHO	DAR	CLT	BRI	ATL	HOM	HOM	TAL; 39	POC	IND	KEN	KEN	TEX	KAN	ROA	DAY	DOV	DOV	DAY; 35	DAR	RCH	RCH	BRI	LVS	TAL	CLT	KAN	TEX	MAR	PHO		71st	3	

==== Camping World Truck Series ====
NASCAR Camping World Truck Series results
Year	Team	No.	Make	1	2	3	4	5	6	7	8	9	10	11	12	13	14	15	16	17	18	19	20	21	22	23	24	25	NCWTC	Pts	Ref
2009	DGM Racing	72	Chevy	DAY	CAL	ATL	MAR	KAN	CLT; 34	DOV	TEX; 28	MCH; 36	MLW	MEM	KEN	IRP	NSH; 30	BRI			GTW; 36	NHA	LVS	MAR	TAL				50th	323	
2009	DGM Racing	92	Chevy																CHI; DNQ	IOW; 31						TEX; DNQ	PHO	HOM	50th	323	
2010	DGM Racing	72	Chevy	DAY	ATL	MAR	NSH	KAN	DOV	CLT	TEX	MCH	IOW	GTY	IRP	POC	NSH	DAR; 35	BRI		KEN; 27	NHA	LVS	MAR	TAL; 36	TEX	PHO	HOM; 34	74th	198	
2010	Tatman Racing	99	Chevy																	CHI; DNQ									74th	198	

^{*} Season still in progress
^{1} Ineligible for series points

=== ARCA Re/Max Series ===
(key) (Bold – Pole position awarded by qualifying time. Italics – Pole position earned by points standings or practice time. * – Most laps led.)

ARCA Re/Max Series results
Year	Team	No.	Make	1	2	3	4	5	6	7	8	9	10	11	12	13	14	15	16	17	18	19	20	21	22	23	ARSC	Pts	Ref
2006	DGM Racing	72	Chevy	DAY	NSH	SLM; DNQ	WIN	KEN	TOL	POC; 30	MCH	KAN; DNQ	KEN	BLN	POC	GTW	NSH	MCH	ISF	MIL	TOL	DSF	CHI	SLM	TAL	IOW	130th	130	
2007	DGM Racing	72	Chevy	DAY	USA; 8	NSH	SLM	KAN; 34	WIN	KEN	TOL	IOW	POC	MCH	BLN	KEN	POC	NSH	ISF	MIL	GTW	DSF	CHI; 20	SLM	TAL; DNQ	TOL	63rd	410	
2008	DGM Racing	72	Chevy	DAY	SLM	IOW	KAN	CAR	KEN	TOL	POC	MCH	CAY	KEN	BLN	POC	NSH	ISF	DSF	CHI	SLM	NJE	TAL; 25	TOL			127th	110	
