= Ryan Ellis (racing driver) =

American racing driver (born 1989)

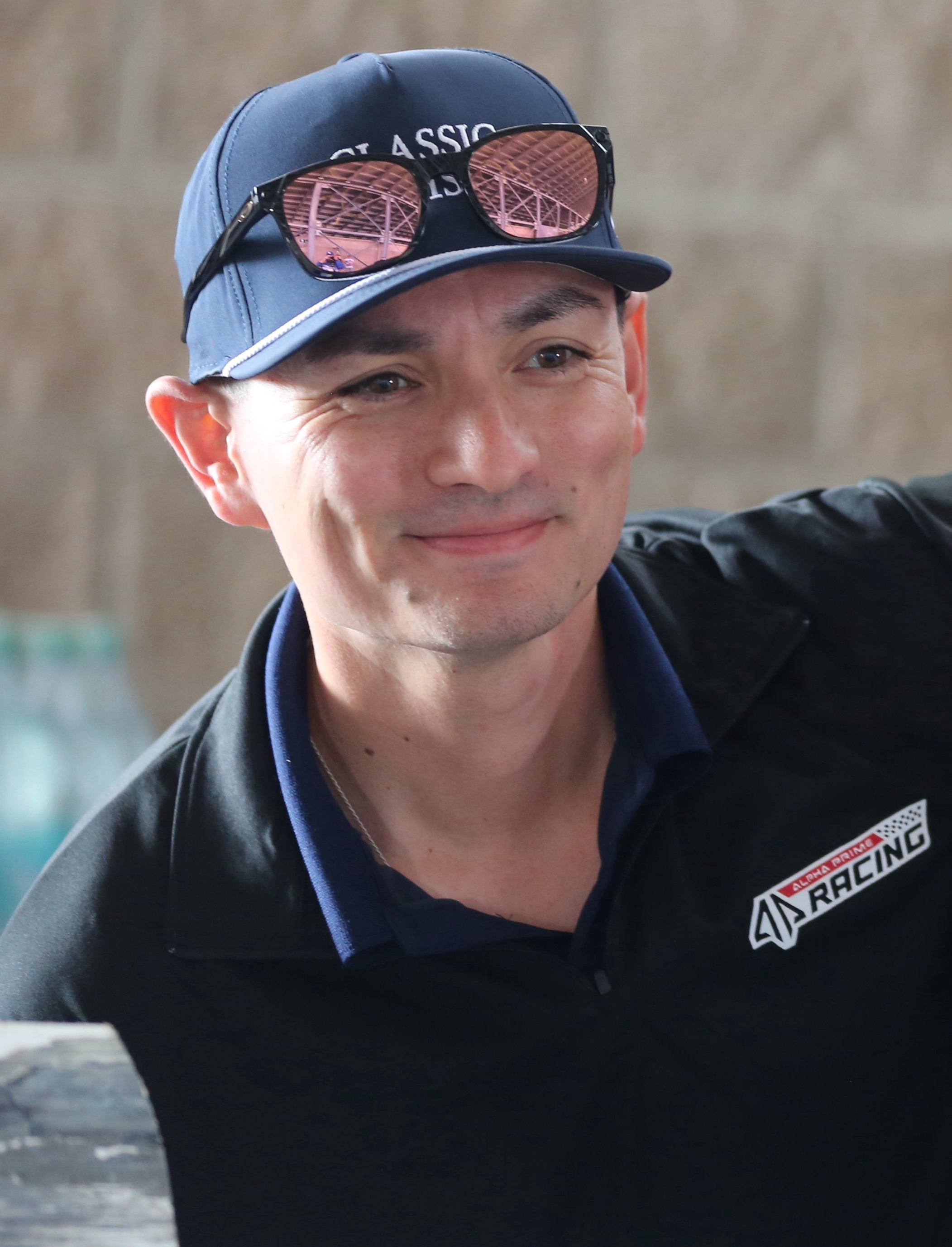
- Ellis at Sonoma Raceway in 2024
- Born: Ryan James Ellis; November 29, 1989 (age 36); Torrance, California, U.S.
- Height: 5 ft 9 in (1.75 m)
- Weight: 160 lb (73 kg)
- Achievements: 2005 Virginia State Legends Pro Champion; 2009 Teen Mazda West Coast Champion; 2011 NASA SU National Champion
- Awards: 2011 Grand-Am ST Rookie of the Year

NASCAR Cup Series career
- 6 races run over 3 years
- 2021 position: 66th
- Best finish: 58th (2016)
- First race: 2015 Quicken Loans Race for Heroes 500 (Phoenix)
- Last race: 2021 Hollywood Casino 400 (Kansas)
Wins	Top tens	Poles
0	0	0

NASCAR O'Reilly Auto Parts Series career
- 197 races run over 14 years
- Car no., team: No. TBA (Alpha Prime Racing)
- 2026 position: 27th
- Best finish: 23rd (2024)
- First race: 2012 Sargento 200 (Road America)
- Last race: 2026 O'Reilly Auto Parts 300 (Homestead)
Wins	Top tens	Poles
0	2	0

NASCAR FedEx Freight Truck Series career
- 26 races run over 4 years
- 2021 position: 114th
- Best finish: 29th (2015)
- First race: 2014 NextEra Energy Resources 250 (Daytona)
- Last race: 2021 In It To Win It 200 (Darlington)
Wins	Top tens	Poles
0	0	0
- Statistics up to date as of November 7, 2026.

Ryan James Ellis (born November 29, 1989) is an American professional stock car racing driver. He competes full-time in the NASCAR O'Reilly Auto Parts Series, driving a Ford Mustang Dark Horse for Alpha Prime Racing. He has also competed in the NASCAR Cup Series and NASCAR Craftsman Truck Series in the past.

== Racing career ==
=== Early career ===
A third-generation racecar driver, Ellis was born on November 29, 1989 in Torrance, California, and began driving Quarter Midgets at the age of four and nearly won the first QMA Dirt National Championship race he entered. He then went on to a have a seven-year career in Quarter Midgets, becoming Virginia's all-time QMA leader and a prominent open-wheel racer.

Entering the Legends scene at the age of twelve, Ellis achieved national success campaigning for the open-wheel INEX Legends Cars. Winning Young Lion and Semi-Pro titles in 2002, 2003, and 2004, Ellis toured the nation in 2005 as a member of INEX's elite Legends Pro division, capturing the 2005 Virginia State Pro Championship and finishing fourth in the National Pro Series. Ellis won dozens of Legends features on the Bullrings of Virginia, North Carolina, Pennsylvania, and Ohio. Still today, Ellis returns to the ovals with his Legends Car several times each year.

=== Road racing ===
In 2006, when he was not running Late Models, Ellis raced his Legends Car, going Road Racing with the National Auto Sport Association (NASA), where he won the majority of the events he entered. Ellis won the 2006 NASA Hyperfest/Summit Point event, captured the 2006 NASA Mid-Atlantic Legends Road Racing Championship, and lost the inaugural 2006 NASA National Championships at Mid-Ohio by a mere two feet. At the end of the 2006 season, Ellis was invited (for the second year in a row) to the second annual Performance Racing Industry National Invitational race at the Orlando Speedworld bullring. In only his second oval track race of the season with the Legends Car, Ellis qualified in the top ten and was running fifth in the prestigious nationally televised event.

In 2007, Ryan Ellis Racing re-established its own internally managed race programs featuring a Pro Legends Car oval racing entry, and in mid-year, they also began contesting a Mazda Spec Miata race car in a partial season of both NASA and SCCA Road Racing. That program led to a full-on 2008 NASA National and Regional Championship chase in the Spec Miata class. In 2008, Ellis finished as runner-up by two points in the NASA Mid Atlantic Spec Miata championship. He was also the highest-finishing driver from his region at the 2008 NASA Spec Miata Nationals, finished second in the inaugural Mazda Teen Challenge program, and was voted "Driver of the Year" by NASA Mid Atlantic.

In February 2009, Ellis was selected in a nationwide search by Volkswagen of America as one of only fifteen new drivers from North America invited to enter their 2009 Jetta TDI Cup series. When he wasn't racing somewhere in the TDI Cup, Ellis spent the 2009 season racing his beloved Mazda Spec Miata with NASA out on the West Coast – where he dominated the 2009 Teen Mazda Challenge and won the season Championship. At the end of the 2009 season, Ellis entered the Playboy Mazda MX-5 Cup twin finale(s) at Virginia International Raceway. There, he surprised the series regulars by running in the lead pack both days and posting solid top-ten finishes in his first time in an MX-5 Cup car. The 2009 season closed with a coveted invite to the Mazdaspeed Motorsports Development MX-5 Cup Shootout, where Ellis (the youngest of the five finalists) finished as the runner-up in the closest competition ever.

In 2010, Ellis won the first two races of the Volkswagen Jetta TDI Cup season before finishing the season sixth in points. Two wins and two poles, both at VIR, fastest lap at two races (Mid-Ohio and VIR), three podiums (VIRx2 and Puebla), led three races at VIR twice, and Road America), and set a new track record at VIR. At the end of the season, he tested with many Grand-Am Continental Tire Sports Car Challenge teams before signing with APR Motorsport for the 2011 season.

At the 2011 season opener for the Continental series at Daytona International Speedway, Ellis broke the track record in qualifying by nearly two seconds, qualified first, and won the first race of his rookie season with teammate Ian Baas. He then won at Homestead–Miami Speedway in Round 2 and finished third at the Continental Tire event at Road America, resulting in a third-place finish in the overall points standings and winning the ST Rookie of the Year.

Ellis signed with Insight Racing in 2012 and won the 2012 Kia 200 with co-driver Martin Jensen before the team folded due to a lack of funding. Ellis was quickly signed to i-MOTO Racing and completed much of the 2012 season with them. In 2013, Ellis was signed to drive with co-driver Mathew Pombo with i-MOTO Racing again. He qualified on pole at Daytona and led much of the race before retiring due to mechanical failure. Ellis qualified in the top three for many races with i-MOTO before being hired by Team SkullCandy Nissan for the balance of the 2013 season.

=== Early NASCAR experiences ===
Ellis had a short-lived entry into the world of NASCAR in 2006. Quickly, Ellis was the NASCAR Late Model Stock Car (LMSC) rookie pacesetter at his home track, Manassas' fabled Old Dominion Speedway. Ellis competed sparingly that spring in both Virginia and North Carolina in NASCAR's highest Weekly Racing Series division. Ellis also raced at Old Dominion's 3/8 oval in 2009, winning another Legends race and driving a NASCAR Late Model once again.

=== NASCAR Truck Series ===
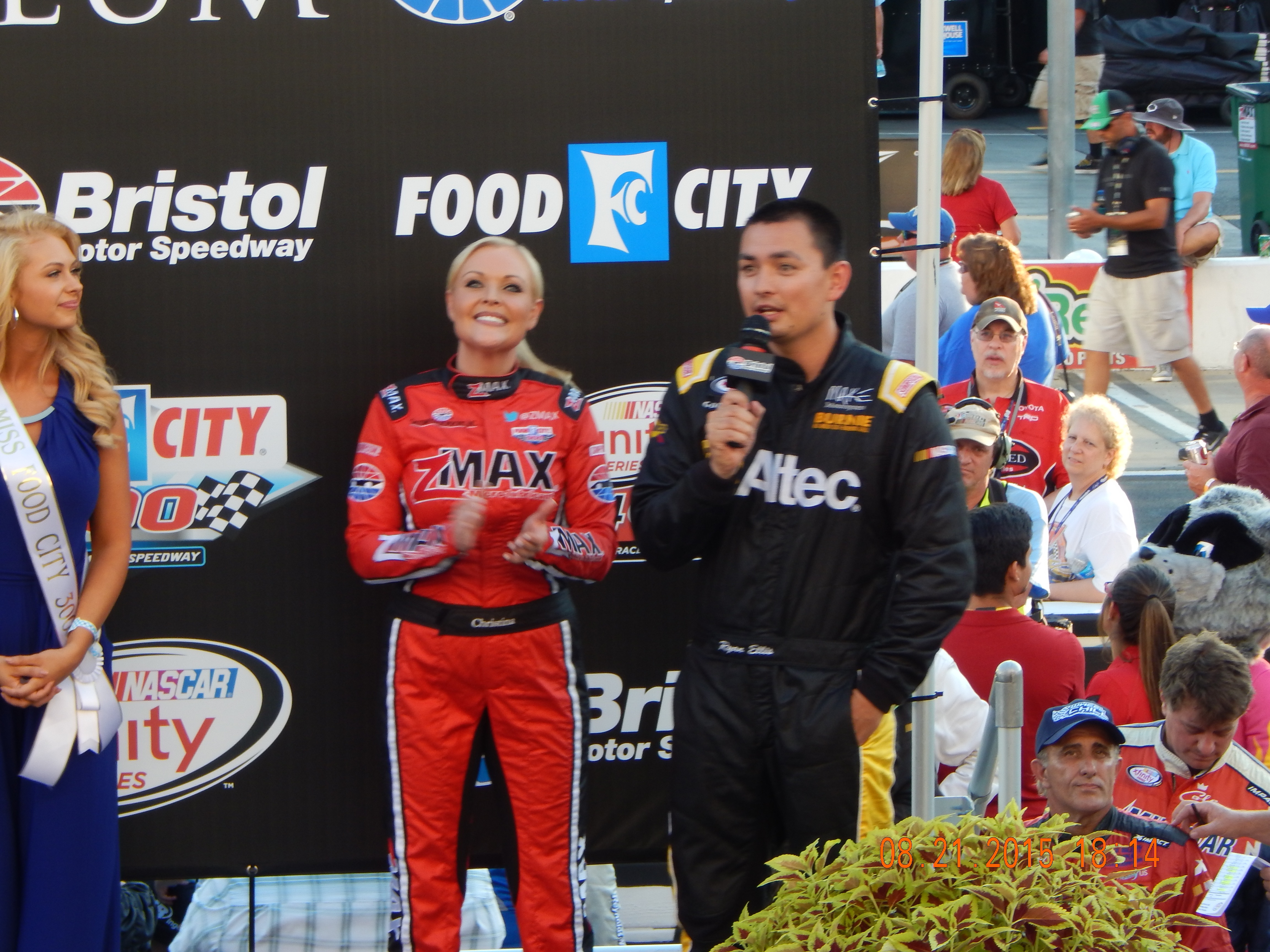
Ellis at Bristol Motor Speedway in 2015

For 2014, Ellis moved to the NASCAR Camping World Truck Series, driving a partial schedule in the No. 28 fielded by FDNY Racing.

=== NASCAR Cup Series ===
Ellis made his Sprint Cup Series debut in the Quicken Loans Race for Heroes 500, driving the No. 33 for Circle Sport. After qualifying 42nd, he finished 40th in the rain-shortened event, eight laps behind race winner Dale Earnhardt Jr. In 2016, Ellis began running multiple races for BK Racing, driving the No. 93 car in the Cup Series with sponsorship from ScienceLogic, starting at Richmond in April.

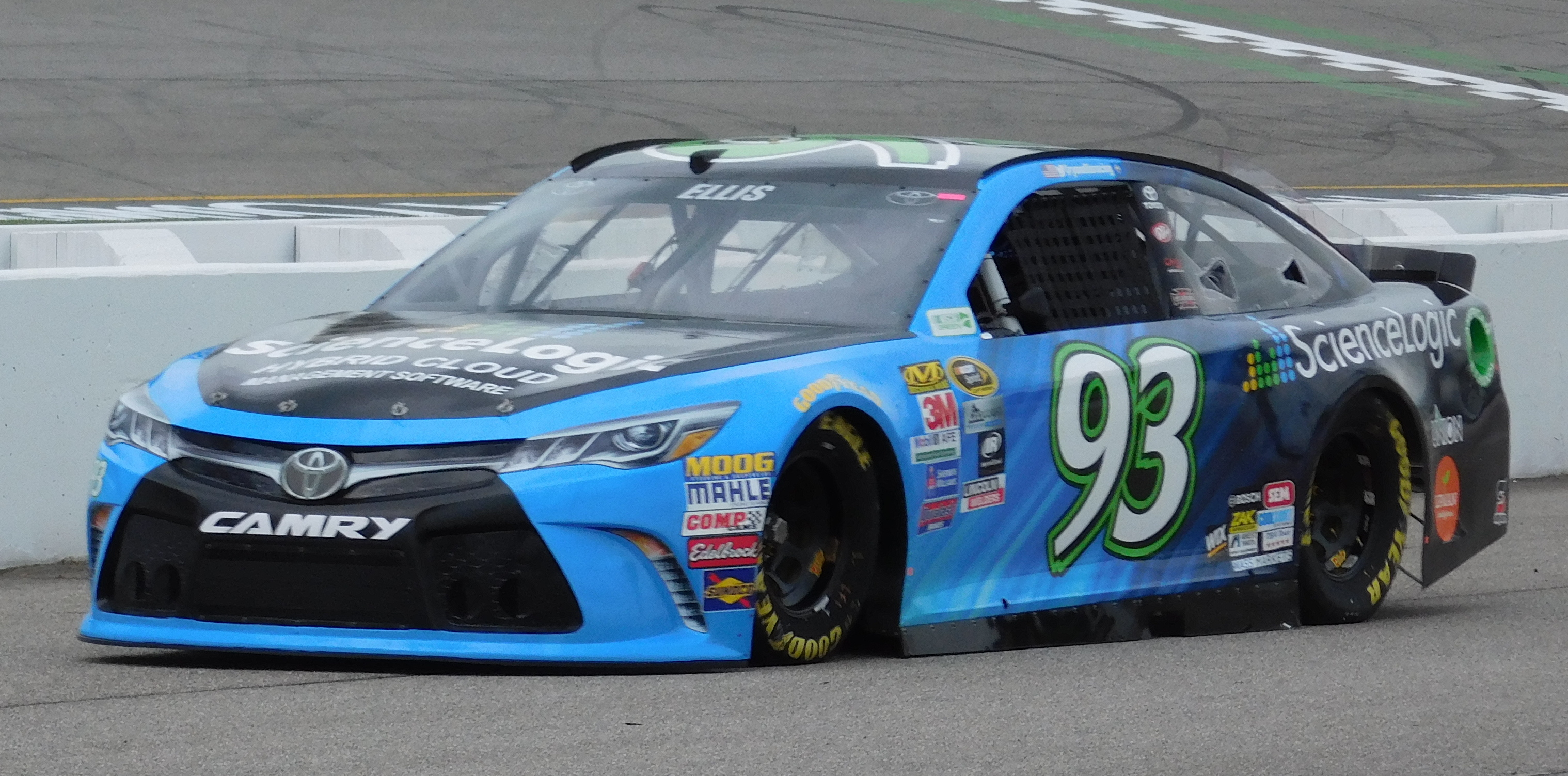
Ellis' No. 93 car at Richmond International Raceway in 2016

With a lack of sponsorship available, Ellis became the public relations representative for Go Fas Racing and Matt DiBenedetto. When DiBenedetto left BK Racing after the 2016 season, Ellis was one of the leading candidates to replace him in the seat before drivers with personal funding took over the ride.

At the Mid-Ohio Xfinity race, Ellis was involved in a late wreck with friend Cody Ware. To make amends, Ware's family team Rick Ware Racing offered Ellis a ride for the Kansas Cup race.

=== NASCAR O'Reilly Auto Parts Series ===
==== Part-time with multiple teams: (2012–2021) ====
From his rookie season in 2012, Ellis drove for various of teams in the Xfinity Series. Ellis continued competing part-time in the series, but with B. J. McLeod Motorsports. After spending 2020 completely away from the driver's seat, Ellis returned to BJMM in 2021 on a seven-race schedule in their No. 99.

==== Alpha Prime Racing: (2022–2024) ====
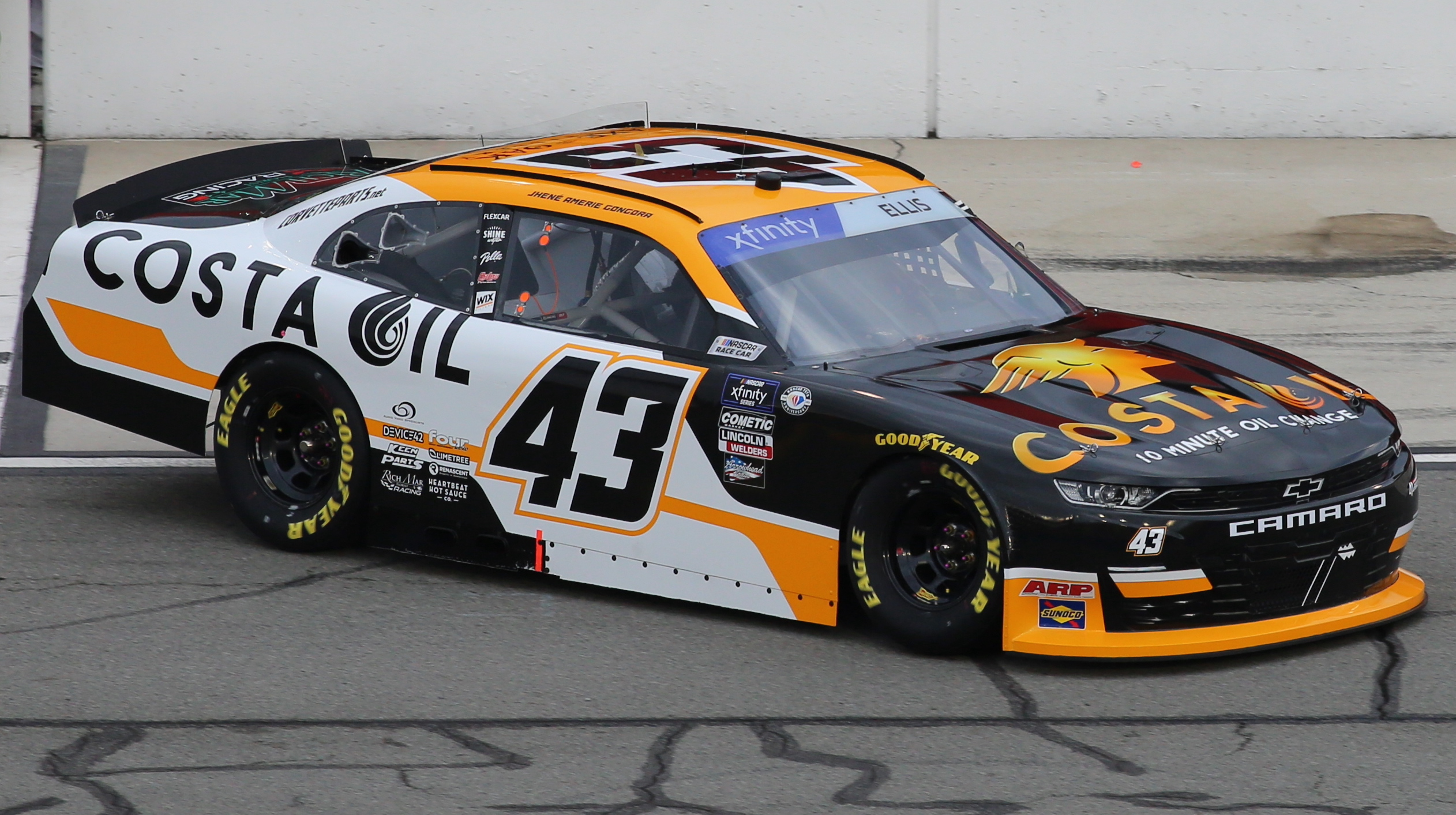
Ellis at Auto Club Speedway in 2023

In 2022, he joined Alpha Prime Racing in the NASCAR Xfinity Series on a partial schedule. In his first race with Alpha Prime, Ellis scored a career-best thirteenth-place finish at Las Vegas Motor Speedway. On September 15, it was announced that Ellis would return to Alpha Prime Racing for the 2023 season on an expanded, but still part-time schedule. He would later go on to compete in almost every race of the season.

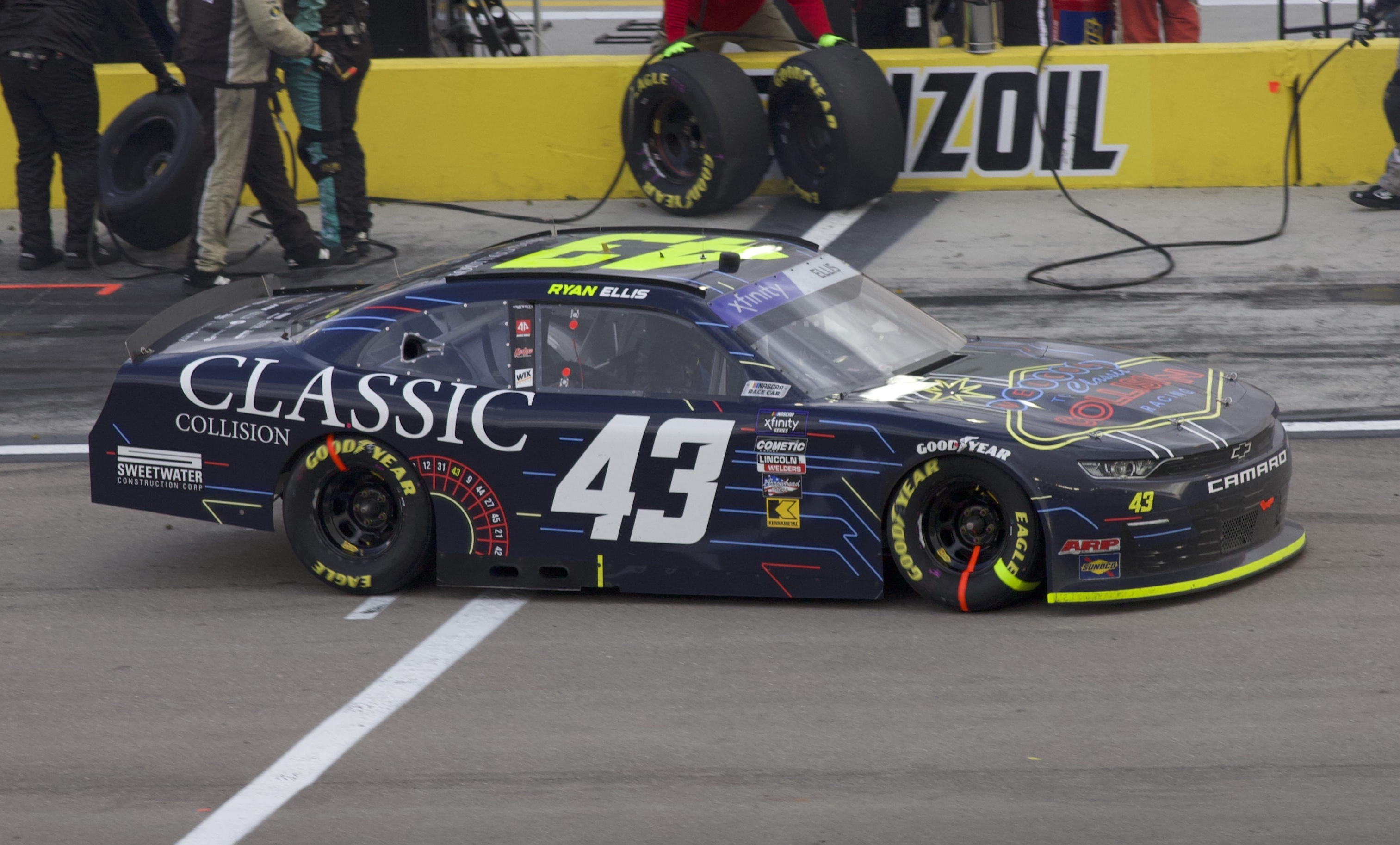
Ellis' No. 43 car at Las Vegas Motor Speedway in 2024.

On August 4, 2023, it was announced that Ellis will be moved to a full-time slate in 2024 in their No. 43 car. He began the 2024 season with an 11th-place finish at Daytona. On October 18, it was announced that Ellis would leave APR at the end of the season.

==== DGM Racing: (2025) ====
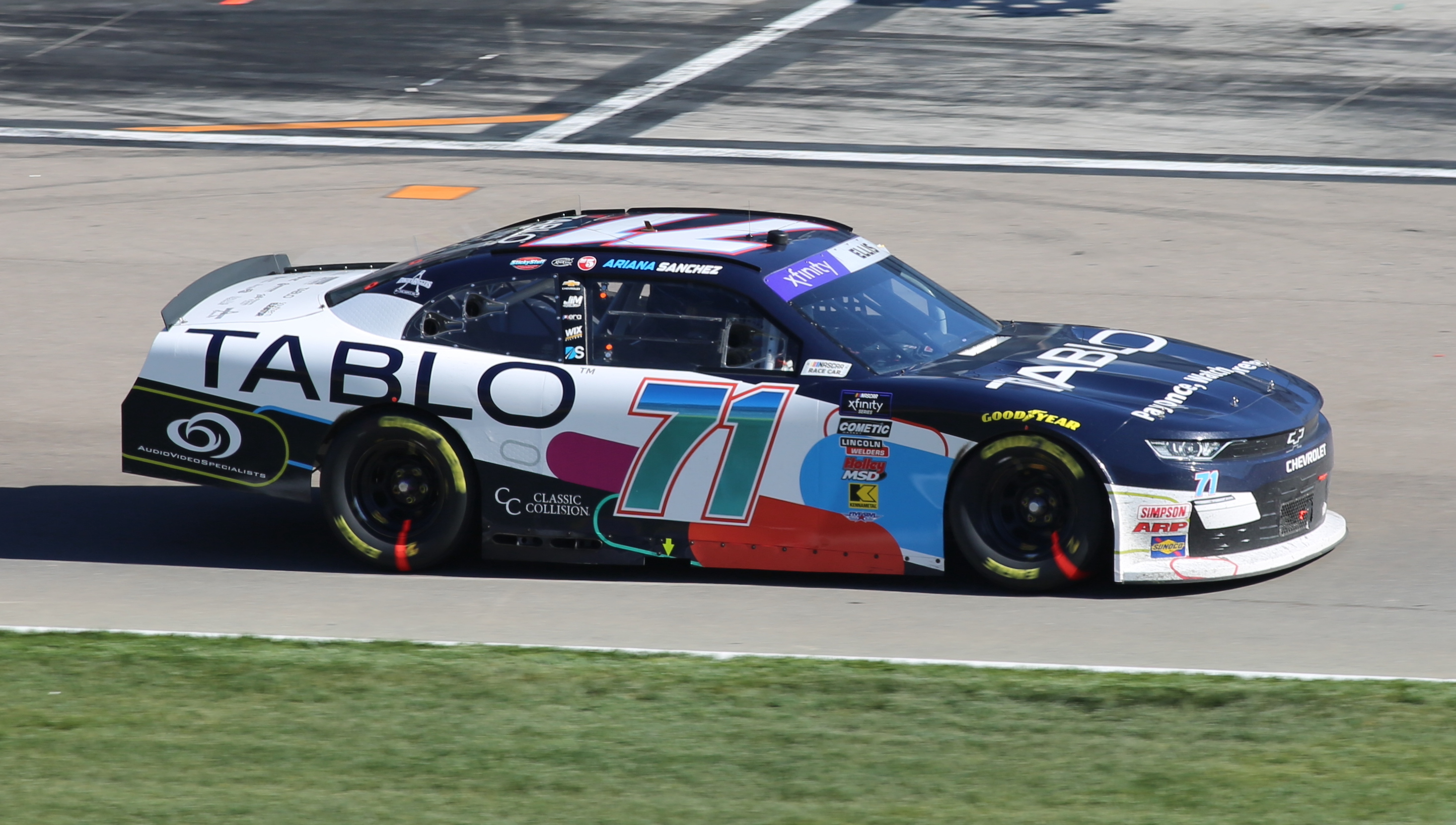
Ellis' No. 71 car at Las Vegas Motor Speedway in 2025

On December 6, 2024, DGM Racing announced that Ellis would drive the No. 71 for the 2025 season. Ellis started the 2025 season with a 23rd-place finish at Daytona. At Charlotte in the spring, he earned his first top-ten finish across all three national series, finishing eighth.

==== Young's Motorsports: (2026) ====
Ellis' No. 02 car at Las Vegas Motor Speedway in 2026

On November 11, 2025, it was announced that Ellis would be joining Young's Motorsports for 2026. He started the 2026 season with a new-career best finish of sixth at Daytona. On September 16, it was announced that Ellis would not return to Young's.

==== Return to Alpha Prime Racing: (2027–) ====
On October 15, 2026, it was announced that Ellis would return to Alpha Prime Racing on a multi-year agreement.

== Personal life ==
Ellis currently resides in Huntersville, North Carolina with his wife, Allison Ellis, who is locally known for her philanthropic endeavors and her love for dogs.

Ellis' parents are Jane Ellis and Jim Ellis of Ashburn, Virginia. He has a younger sister named Kara. Ellis graduated from Stone Bridge High School in 2008 and attended George Mason University (GMU) before finishing his degree through Appalachian State University. Ellis is a member of Kappa Sigma fraternity. He used to serve as a resident Pro Racing Instructor at Allsports Grand Prix in Sterling, Virginia.

Ellis hosts his own podcast, "Not Another Racing Podcast". Fellow NASCAR driver Matt DiBenedetto is also a host on CBS/WJFK's weekly radio talk show called "In the Pits".

Outside of racing, Ellis is an avid hockey player and has played professionally with the Potomac Mavericks of the PIHA and for the GMU college hockey team. Ellis also plays hockey recreationally, with several adults playing ice hockey and inline leagues. A dedicated fan of the National Hockey League's Washington Capitals, Ellis added an anti-Pittsburgh Penguins logo to the back of some of his helmets, before designing a Capitals-themed helmet in 2018 that eventually commemorated the team's first Stanley Cup victory. Ellis still plays hockey for a team based in Charlotte.

== Motorsports career results ==
=== Racing career summary ===
Season	Series	Team	Races	Wins	Top 5	Top 10	Points	Position
2012	NASCAR Nationwide Series	Hamilton Means Racing	1	0	0	0	5	99th
2013	NASCAR Nationwide Series	Hamilton Means Racing	1	0	0	0	57	55th
2013	NASCAR Nationwide Series	SR2 Motorsports	5	0	0	0	57	55th
2014	NASCAR Camping World Truck Series	Rosenblum Racing	4	0	0	0	0	NC†
2014	NASCAR Camping World Truck Series	JJC Racing	4	0	0	0	0	NC†
2014	NASCAR Camping World Truck Series	Win-Tron Racing	1	0	0	0	0	NC†
2014	NASCAR Nationwide Series	SR2 Motorsports	1	0	0	0	104	37th
2014	NASCAR Nationwide Series	The Motorsports Group	7	0	0	0	104	37th
2014	NASCAR Nationwide Series	Rick Ware Racing	2	0	0	0	104	37th
2014	NASCAR Nationwide Series	JGL Racing	2	0	0	0	104	37th
2014	NASCAR Nationwide Series	Vision Racing	0	0	0	0	104	37th
2015	NASCAR Camping World Truck Series	FDNY Racing	2	0	0	0	192	29th
2015	NASCAR Camping World Truck Series	MAKE Motorsports	9	0	0	0	192	29th
2015	NASCAR Xfinity Series	JGL Racing	1	0	0	0	0	NC†
2015	NASCAR Xfinity Series	Jimmy Means Racing	1	0	0	0	0	NC†
2015	NASCAR Xfinity Series	Rick Ware Racing	5	0	0	0	0	NC†
2015	NASCAR Xfinity Series	Obaika Racing	2	0	0	0	0	NC†
2015	NASCAR Sprint Cup Series	Circle Sport	1	0	0	0	0	NC†
2016	NASCAR Camping World Truck Series	FDNY Racing	0	0	0	0	0	NC†
2016	NASCAR Camping World Truck Series	MAKE Motorsports	2	0	0	0	0	NC†
2016	NASCAR Camping World Truck Series	Norm Benning Racing	1	0	0	0	0	NC†
2016	NASCAR Camping World Truck Series	MB Motorsports	0	0	0	0	0	NC†
2016	NASCAR Camping World Truck Series	JJC Racing	0	0	0	0	0	NC†
2016	NASCAR Xfinity Series	Rick Ware Racing	7	0	0	0	191	30th
2016	NASCAR Xfinity Series	Obaika Racing	9	0	0	0	191	30th
2016	NASCAR Sprint Cup Series	BK Racing	3	0	0	0	0	NC†
2016	NASCAR Sprint Cup Series	Premium Motorsports	1	0	0	0	0	NC†
2017	NASCAR Xfinity Series	SS-Green Light Racing	1	0	0	0	16	63rd
2018	NASCAR Xfinity Series	B. J. McLeod Motorsports	2	0	0	0	27	57th
2019	NASCAR Xfinity Series	B. J. McLeod Motorsports	2	0	0	0	30	59th
2021	NASCAR Camping World Truck Series	Reaume Brothers Racing	2	0	0	0	0	NC†
2021	NASCAR Xfinity Series	B. J. McLeod Motorsports	6	0	0	0	67	44th
2021	NASCAR Xfinity Series	Mike Harmon Racing	0	0	0	0	67	44th
2021	NASCAR Cup Series	Rick Ware Racing	1	0	0	0	0	NC†
2022	NASCAR Xfinity Series	Alpha Prime Racing	11	0	0	0	155	36th
2023	NASCAR Xfinity Series	Alpha Prime Racing	31	0	0	0	366	25th
2024	NASCAR Xfinity Series	Alpha Prime Racing	33	0	0	0	441	23rd
2025	NASCAR Xfinity Series	DGM Racing	33	0	0	1	419	28th
2026	NASCAR O'Reilly Auto Parts Series	Young's Motorsports	27	0	0	1	279*	27th*

^{†} As Ellis was a guest driver, he was ineligible for championship points.

=== NASCAR ===
(key) (Bold – Pole position awarded by qualifying time. Italics – Pole position earned by points standings or practice time. * – Most laps led.)

==== Cup Series ====
NASCAR Cup Series results
Year	Team	No.	Make	1	2	3	4	5	6	7	8	9	10	11	12	13	14	15	16	17	18	19	20	21	22	23	24	25	26	27	28	29	30	31	32	33	34	35	36	NCSC	Pts	Ref
2015	Circle Sport	33	Chevy	DAY	ATL	LVS	PHO	CAL	MAR	TEX	BRI	RCH	TAL	KAN	CLT	DOV	POC	MCH	SON	DAY	KEN	NHA	IND	POC	GLN	MCH	BRI	DAR	RCH	CHI	NHA	DOV	CLT	KAN	TAL	MAR	TEX	PHO; 40	HOM	75th	0^{1}	
2016	BK Racing	93	Toyota	DAY	ATL	LVS	PHO	CAL	MAR	TEX	BRI	RCH; 37	TAL	KAN	DOV	CLT	POC	MCH	SON	DAY	KEN		IND; 32	POC	GLN	BRI	MCH	DAR	RCH	CHI	NHA	DOV	CLT	KAN	TAL	MAR	TEX; 38	PHO	HOM	58th	0^{1}	
2016	Premium Motorsports	98	Chevy																			NHA; 37																		58th	0^{1}	
2021	Rick Ware Racing	15	Chevy	DAY	DRC	HOM	LVS	PHO	ATL	BRD	MAR	RCH	TAL	KAN	DAR	DOV	COA	CLT	SON	NSH	POC	POC	ROA	ATL	NHA	GLN	IRC	MCH	DAY	DAR	RCH	BRI	LVS	TAL	ROV	TEX	KAN; 36	MAR	PHO	66th	0^{1}	

==== O'Reilly Auto Parts Series ====
NASCAR O'Reilly Auto Parts Series results
Year	Team	No.	Make	1	2	3	4	5	6	7	8	9	10	11	12	13	14	15	16	17	18	19	20	21	22	23	24	25	26	27	28	29	30	31	32	33	NOAPSC	Pts	Ref
2012	Hamilton Means Racing	52	Chevy	DAY	PHO	LVS	BRI	CAL	TEX	RCH	TAL	DAR	IOW	CLT	DOV	MCH	ROA; 39	KEN	DAY	NHA	CHI	IND	IOW	GLN; DNQ	CGV; DNQ	BRI	ATL	RCH	CHI	KEN	DOV	CLT	KAN	TEX	PHO	HOM	99th	5	
2013	Hamilton Means Racing	52	Chevy	DAY	PHO	LVS	BRI	CAL	TEX	RCH	TAL	DAR	CLT	DOV	IOW	MCH	ROA	KEN	DAY	NHA	CHI	IND	IOW	GLN	MOH; 38	BRI	ATL										55th	57	
2013	SR² Motorsports	24	Toyota																									RCH; 31	CHI	KEN; 35	DOV; 32	KAN	CLT	TEX; 35	PHO	HOM; 36	55th	57	
2014	SR² Motorsports	24	Toyota	DAY	PHO	LVS; 28	BRI	CAL	TEX	DAR	RCH	TAL																									37th	104	
2014	The Motorsports Group	46	Chevy										IOW; 40	CLT			ROA; 34	KEN	DAY		CHI; 37	IND	IOW	GLN					CHI; 39	KEN; 39	DOV; 40	KAN; DNQ	CLT; DNQ	TEX; 40	PHO; DNQ	HOM; DNQ	37th	104	
2014	Rick Ware Racing	15	Chevy												DOV; 38																						37th	104	
2014	Rick Ware Racing	23	Chevy													MCH; 29																					37th	104	
2014	JGL Racing	93	Dodge																	NHA; 36								RCH; 24									37th	104	
2014	JD Motorsports	01	Chevy																						MOH; QL^{†}												37th	104	
2014	Vision Racing	37	Dodge																							BRI; DNQ	ATL										37th	104	
2015	JGL Racing	26	Toyota	DAY	ATL	LVS	PHO	CAL	TEX	BRI	RCH	TAL	IOW; 35	CLT	DOV	MCH	CHI	DAY																			102nd	0^{1}	
2015	Jimmy Means Racing	79	Chevy																KEN; 39	NHA	IND	IOW															102nd	0^{1}	
2015	Rick Ware Racing	15	Chevy																				GLN; 22		BRI; 28	ROA		RCH; 35	CHI	KEN; 37							102nd	0^{1}	
2015	JD Motorsports	01	Chevy																					MOH; QL^{†}													102nd	0^{1}	
2015	Rick Ware Racing	17	Ford																								DAR; 40										102nd	0^{1}	
2015	Obaika Racing	97	Chevy																												DOV; 26	CLT; 23					102nd	0^{1}	
2015	Rick Ware Racing	17	Chevy																														KAN; 34	TEX	PHO	HOM	102nd	0^{1}	
2016	Rick Ware Racing	15	Ford	DAY	ATL	LVS; QL^{‡}	PHO; QL^{±}	CAL																													30th	191	
2016	Obaika Racing	97	Chevy						TEX; 30	BRI; 35	RCH; 29	TAL; 35									IND; 30	IOW	GLN; 30							KEN; 22				TEX; 33			30th	191	
2016	Rick Ware Racing	25	Chevy										DOV; 31	CLT	POC; 25	MCH	IOW							MOH; 18	BRI	ROA	DAR; 33	RCH	CHI; 27		DOV; 36						30th	191	
2016	Rick Ware Racing	15	Chevy															DAY; 15	KEN	NHA																	30th	191	
2016	Obaika Racing	77	Chevy																													CLT; DNQ	KAN; 36		PHO; DNQ	HOM; DNQ	30th	191	
2017	SS-Green Light Racing	07	Chevy	DAY	ATL	LVS	PHO	CAL	TEX	BRI	RCH	TAL	CLT	DOV	POC	MCH	IOW	DAY	KEN	NHA	IND	IOW	GLN	MOH	BRI	ROA; 21	DAR	RCH	CHI	KEN	DOV	CLT	KAN	TEX	PHO	HOM	63rd	16	
2018	B. J. McLeod Motorsports	78	Toyota	DAY; 30	ATL	LVS	PHO	CAL	TEX	BRI	RCH	TAL	DOV	CLT	POC	MCH	IOW	CHI	DAY	KEN	NHA	IOW	GLN	MOH	BRI												57th	27	
2018	B. J. McLeod Motorsports	78	Chevy																							ROA; 17	DAR	IND	LVS	RCH	ROV	DOV	KAN	TEX	PHO	HOM	57th	27	
2019	B. J. McLeod Motorsports	99	Toyota	DAY	ATL	LVS	PHO	CAL	TEX	BRI	RCH	TAL	DOV	CLT	POC	MCH	IOW; 23	CHI	DAY	KEN	NHA	IOW	GLN	MOH	BRI												59th	30	
2019	B. J. McLeod Motorsports	78	Toyota																							ROA; 21	DAR	IND	LVS	RCH	ROV	DOV	KAN	TEX	PHO	HOM	59th	30	
2021	B. J. McLeod Motorsports	99	Toyota	DAY	DRC	HOM	LVS	PHO	ATL	MAR	TAL	DAR; 16	DOV	COA; 24	CLT	MOH; 28	TEX	NSH	POC								DAR; 35	RCH	BRI	LVS	TAL	ROV	TEX	KAN			44th	67	
2021	B. J. McLeod Motorsports	78	Toyota																	ROA; 30	ATL	NHA	GLN	IRC	MCH	DAY											44th	67	
2021	B. J. McLeod Motorsports	99	Chevy																																MAR; 23		44th	67	
2021	Mike Harmon Racing	74	Chevy																																	PHO; DNQ	44th	67	
2022	Alpha Prime Racing	44	Chevy	DAY	CAL	LVS; 13	PHO; 16	ATL	COA	RCH		TAL; 32			TEX; 30	CLT; 13	PIR	NSH; 24	ROA	ATL	NHA	POC	IRC; 36	MCH; 27	GLN	DAY	DAR; 22	KAN	BRI; 19	TEX	TAL	ROV	LVS	HOM	MAR	PHO	36th	155	
2022	Alpha Prime Racing	45	Chevy								MAR; DNQ		DOV; 20	DAR																							36th	155	
2023	Alpha Prime Racing	43	Chevy	DAY; 35	CAL; 34	LVS; 27	PHO; 19	ATL; 23	COA; 20	RCH; 15	MAR; 28		DOV; 25	DAR; 33	CLT; 27	PIR	SON	NSH; 28	CSC; 31	ATL; 25	NHA; 19	POC; 18	ROA; 35	MCH; 23	IRC; 29	GLN; 30	DAY; 32	DAR; 29	KAN; 17	BRI; 18	TEX; 13	ROV; 36		HOM; 24	MAR; 24	PHO; 26	25th	366	
2023	Alpha Prime Racing	45	Chevy									TAL; 11																									25th	366	
2023	Alpha Prime Racing	43	Ford																														LVS; 27				25th	366	
2024	Alpha Prime Racing	43	Chevy	DAY; 11	ATL; 25	LVS; 22	PHO; 21	COA; 33	RCH; 27	MAR; 26	TEX; 26	TAL; 26	DOV; 13	DAR; 38	CLT; 27	PIR; 17	SON; 26	IOW; 14	NHA; 35	NSH; 23	CSC; 21	POC; 36	IND; 23	MCH; 14	DAY; 37	DAR; 21	ATL; 21	GLN; 15	BRI; 24	KAN; 19	TAL; 15	ROV; 31	LVS; 28	HOM; 25	MAR; 18	PHO; 25	23rd	441	
2025	DGM Racing	71	Chevy	DAY; 23	ATL; 18	COA; 16	PHO; 33	LVS; 34	HOM; 20	MAR; 18	DAR; 22	BRI; 27	CAR; 33	TAL; 16	TEX; 23	CLT; 8	NSH; 36	MXC; 32	POC; 32	ATL; 21	CSC; 25	SON; 27	DOV; 30	IND; 21	IOW; 25	GLN; 29	DAY; 11	PIR; 21	GTW; 18	BRI; 38	KAN; 26	ROV; 24	LVS; 29	TAL; 27	MAR; 22	PHO; 21	28th	419	
2026	Young's Motorsports	02	Chevy	DAY; 6	ATL; 22	COA; 34	PHO; 38	LVS; 30	DAR; 32	MAR; 36	CAR; 22	BRI; 30	KAN; 22	TAL; 36	TEX; 24	GLN; 34	DOV; 25	CLT; 21	NSH; 29	POC; 24	COR; 30	SON; 23	CHI; 22	ATL; 23	IND; 32	IOW; 23	DAY; 17	DAR; 37	GTW; 24	BRI; 27	LVS; 29	CLT; 34	PHO; 18	TAL; 30	MAR; 38	HOM; 29	27th	325	
^{†} – Qualified for Landon Cassill · ^{‡} – Qualified for Stanton Barrett · ^{±} – Qualified but replaced by Todd Peck

==== Camping World Truck Series ====
NASCAR Camping World Truck Series results
Year	Team	No.	Make	1	2	3	4	5	6	7	8	9	10	11	12	13	14	15	16	17	18	19	20	21	22	23	NCWTC	Pts	Ref
2014	Rosenblum Racing	28	Chevy	DAY; 18	MAR		CLT; 27							POC; 19	MCH	BRI	MSP	CHI	NHA	LVS	TAL; 23	MAR					100th	0^{1}	
2014	JJC Racing	0	Chevy			KAN; 28		DOV; 34	TEX; 27	GTW	KEN; 32	IOW	ELD														100th	0^{1}	
2014	Win-Tron Racing	35	Toyota																				TEX; 31	PHO	HOM		100th	0^{1}	
2015	FDNY Racing	28	Chevy	DAY; 16	ATL	MAR		CLT; DNQ							POC; 20	MCH											29th	192	
2015	MAKE Motorsports	1	Chevy				KAN; 20		DOV; 24	TEX; 20	GTW; 17	IOW; 29					BRI; 28										29th	192	
2015	MAKE Motorsports	50	Chevy										KEN; 30	ELD				MSP; 31	CHI; 29	NHA	LVS	TAL; DNQ	MAR	TEX	PHO	HOM	29th	192	
2016	FDNY Racing	28	Chevy	DAY; DNQ											POC; 20	BRI											100th	0^{1}	
2016	MAKE Motorsports	50	Chevy		ATL; DNQ	MAR																					100th	0^{1}	
2016	MAKE Motorsports	1	Chevy				KAN; 30	DOV	CLT	TEX; 30	IOW	GTW	KEN	ELD													100th	0^{1}	
2016	Norm Benning Racing	6	Chevy														MCH; 31	MSP	CHI	NHA	LVS						100th	0^{1}	
2016	MB Motorsports	63	Chevy																			TAL; DNQ	MAR				100th	0^{1}	
2016	JJC Racing	10	Chevy																					TEX; DNQ	PHO	HOM	100th	0^{1}	
2021	Reaume Brothers Racing	34	Chevy	DAY	DRC	LVS	ATL; 34	BRD	RCH	KAN	DAR	COA	CLT	TEX	NSH	POC	KNX	GLN	GTW								114th	0^{1}	
2021	Reaume Brothers Racing	33	Toyota																	DAR; 37	BRI	LVS	TAL	MAR	PHO		114th	0^{1}	

^{*} Season still in progress
^{1} Ineligible for series points
