= 2021 NASCAR Cup Series Championship Race =

NASCAR Cup Series race

Race details
- Race 36 of 36 in the 2021 NASCAR Cup Series
- The race's program cover, featuring 2020 NASCAR Cup Series champion Chase Elliott.
- Date: November 7, 2021
- Location: Phoenix Raceway in Avondale, Arizona
- Course: Permanent racing facility
- Course length: 1 miles (1.6 km)
- Distance: 312 laps, 312 mi (499.2 km)
- Average speed: 100.348 miles per hour (161.494 km/h)

Pole position
Driver	Kyle Larson	Hendrick Motorsports
- Time: 26.116

Most laps led
Driver	Kyle Larson	Hendrick Motorsports
- Laps: 108

Winner
No. 5	Kyle Larson	Hendrick Motorsports

Television in the United States
- Network: NBC
- Announcers: Rick Allen, Jeff Burton, Steve Letarte and Dale Earnhardt Jr.

Radio in the United States
- Radio: MRN
- Booth announcers: Alex Hayden, Jeff Striegle and Rusty Wallace
- Turn announcers: Dave Moody (1 & 2) and Mike Bagley (3 & 4)

The 2021 NASCAR Cup Series Championship Race was a NASCAR Cup Series race held on November 7, 2021 at Phoenix Raceway in Avondale, Arizona. Contested over 312 laps on the one mile (1.6 km) oval, it was the 36th and final race of the 2021 NASCAR Cup Series season, and was also the last race for the Generation 6 chassis, as it was replaced in 2022 by the seventh-generation chassis with composite body. Kyle Larson won the race and claimed his first NASCAR Cup Series Championship.

== Report ==
=== Background ===
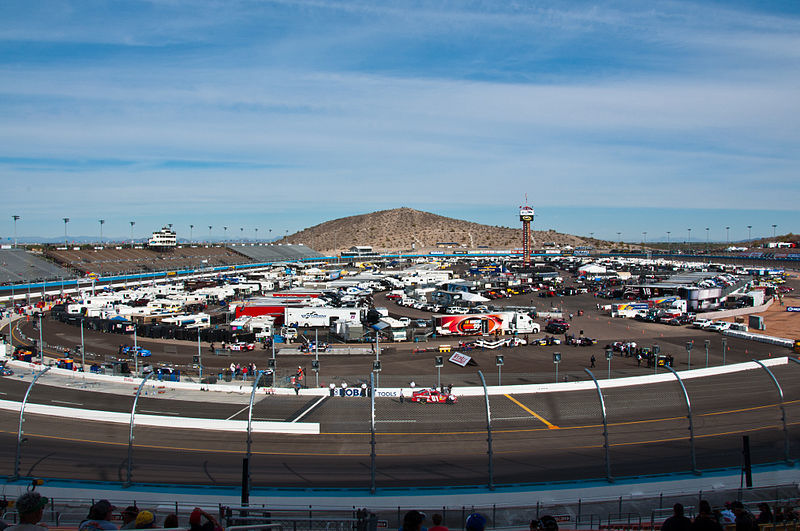
Phoenix Raceway, the track where the race was held.

Phoenix Raceway – also known as PIR – is a one-mile, low-banked tri-oval race track located in Avondale, Arizona. It is named after the nearby metropolitan area of Phoenix. The motorsport track opened in 1964 and currently hosts two NASCAR race weekends annually. PIR has also hosted the IndyCar Series, CART, USAC and the Rolex Sports Car Series. The raceway is currently owned and operated by International Speedway Corporation.

The raceway was originally constructed with a 2.5 mi (4.0 km) road course that ran both inside and outside of the main tri-oval. In 1991 the track was reconfigured with the current 1.51 mi (2.43 km) interior layout. PIR has an estimated grandstand seating capacity of around 67,000. Lights were installed around the track in 2004 following the addition of a second annual NASCAR race weekend.

Phoenix Raceway is home to two annual NASCAR race weekends, one of 13 facilities on the NASCAR schedule to host more than one race weekend a year. The track is both the first and last stop in the western United States, as well as the fourth and the last track on the schedule.

==== Championship drivers ====
Kyle Larson was the first of the four drivers to clinch a spot in the Championship 4, winning the first race of the Round of 8 at Texas. Chase Elliott, Martin Truex Jr., and Denny Hamlin clinched the remaining three spots based on points.

==== Entry list ====
- (R) denotes rookie driver.
- (i) denotes driver who are ineligible for series driver points.
- (CC) denotes championship contender.

No.	Driver	Team	Manufacturer
00	Quin Houff	StarCom Racing	Chevrolet
1	Kurt Busch	Chip Ganassi Racing	Chevrolet
2	Brad Keselowski	Team Penske	Ford
3	Austin Dillon	Richard Childress Racing	Chevrolet
4	Kevin Harvick	Stewart-Haas Racing	Ford
5	Kyle Larson (CC)	Hendrick Motorsports	Chevrolet
6	Ryan Newman	Roush Fenway Racing	Ford
7	Corey LaJoie	Spire Motorsports	Chevrolet
8	Tyler Reddick	Richard Childress Racing	Chevrolet
9	Chase Elliott (CC)	Hendrick Motorsports	Chevrolet
10	Aric Almirola	Stewart-Haas Racing	Ford
11	Denny Hamlin (CC)	Joe Gibbs Racing	Toyota
12	Ryan Blaney	Team Penske	Ford
13	David Starr (i)	MBM Motorsports	Toyota
14	Chase Briscoe (R)	Stewart-Haas Racing	Ford
15	Garrett Smithley (i)	Rick Ware Racing	Chevrolet
17	Chris Buescher	Roush Fenway Racing	Ford
18	Kyle Busch	Joe Gibbs Racing	Toyota
19	Martin Truex Jr. (CC)	Joe Gibbs Racing	Toyota
20	Christopher Bell	Joe Gibbs Racing	Toyota
21	Matt DiBenedetto	Wood Brothers Racing	Ford
22	Joey Logano	Team Penske	Ford
23	Bubba Wallace	23XI Racing	Toyota
24	William Byron	Hendrick Motorsports	Chevrolet
34	Michael McDowell	Front Row Motorsports	Ford
37	Ryan Preece	JTG Daugherty Racing	Chevrolet
38	Anthony Alfredo (R)	Front Row Motorsports	Ford
41	Cole Custer	Stewart-Haas Racing	Ford
42	Ross Chastain	Chip Ganassi Racing	Chevrolet
43	Erik Jones	Richard Petty Motorsports	Chevrolet
47	Ricky Stenhouse Jr.	JTG Daugherty Racing	Chevrolet
48	Alex Bowman	Hendrick Motorsports	Chevrolet
51	Cody Ware (i)	Petty Ware Racing	Chevrolet
52	Josh Bilicki (i)	Rick Ware Racing	Ford
53	Joey Gase (i)	Rick Ware Racing	Chevrolet
66	Timmy Hill (i)	MBM Motorsports	Toyota
77	Justin Haley (i)	Spire Motorsports	Chevrolet
78	B. J. McLeod (i)	Live Fast Motorsports	Ford
99	Daniel Suárez	Trackhouse Racing Team	Chevrolet
Official entry list

== Practice ==
Brad Keselowski was the fastest in the practice session with a time of 26.591 with an average speed of 135.384 mph (217.879 km/h).

=== Practice results ===
Pos	No.	Driver	Team	Manufacturer	Time	Speed
1	2	Brad Keselowski	Team Penske	Ford	26.591	135.384
2	5	Kyle Larson	Hendrick Motorsports	Chevrolet	26.609	135.293
3	21	Matt DiBenedetto	Wood Brothers Racing	Ford	26.645	135.110
Official practice results

== Qualifying ==
Kyle Larson scored the pole for the race with a time of 26.116 and a speed of 137.847 mph (221.843 km/h).

=== Qualifying results ===
Pos	No.	Driver	Team	Manufacturer	Time
1	5	Kyle Larson (CC)	Hendrick Motorsports	Chevrolet	26.116
2	9	Chase Elliott (CC)	Hendrick Motorsports	Chevrolet	26.289
3	24	William Byron	Hendrick Motorsports	Chevrolet	26.307
4	12	Ryan Blaney	Team Penske	Ford	26.315
5	1	Kurt Busch	Chip Ganassi Racing	Chevrolet	26.327
6	11	Denny Hamlin (CC)	Joe Gibbs Racing	Toyota	26.361
7	41	Cole Custer	Stewart-Haas Racing	Ford	26.432
8	20	Christopher Bell	Joe Gibbs Racing	Toyota	26.433
9	4	Kevin Harvick	Stewart-Haas Racing	Ford	26.434
10	22	Joey Logano	Team Penske	Ford	26.436
11	2	Brad Keselowski	Team Penske	Ford	26.469
12	19	Martin Truex Jr. (CC)	Joe Gibbs Racing	Toyota	26.494
13	18	Kyle Busch	Joe Gibbs Racing	Toyota	26.502
14	48	Alex Bowman	Hendrick Motorsports	Chevrolet	26.544
15	21	Matt DiBenedetto	Wood Brothers Racing	Ford	26.544
16	42	Ross Chastain	Chip Ganassi Racing	Chevrolet	26.544
17	99	Daniel Suárez	Trackhouse Racing Team	Chevrolet	26.558
18	10	Aric Almirola	Stewart-Haas Racing	Ford	26.568
19	6	Ryan Newman	Roush Fenway Racing	Ford	26.576
20	8	Tyler Reddick	Richard Childress Racing	Chevrolet	26.592
21	47	Ricky Stenhouse Jr.	JTG Daugherty Racing	Chevrolet	26.594
22	14	Chase Briscoe (R)	Stewart-Haas Racing	Ford	26.623
23	3	Austin Dillon	Richard Childress Racing	Chevrolet	26.649
24	7	Corey LaJoie	Spire Motorsports	Chevrolet	26.652
25	23	Bubba Wallace	23XI Racing	Toyota	26.665
26	17	Chris Buescher	Roush Fenway Racing	Ford	26.683
27	43	Erik Jones	Richard Petty Motorsports	Chevrolet	26.722
28	34	Michael McDowell	Front Row Motorsports	Ford	26.811
29	77	Justin Haley (i)	Spire Motorsports	Chevrolet	26.812
30	38	Anthony Alfredo (R)	Front Row Motorsports	Ford	26.906
31	37	Ryan Preece	JTG Daugherty Racing	Chevrolet	26.921
32	78	B. J. McLeod (i)	Live Fast Motorsports	Ford	27.181
33	51	Cody Ware (i)	Petty Ware Racing	Chevrolet	27.560
34	53	Joey Gase (i)	Rick Ware Racing	Chevrolet	27.716
35	00	Quin Houff	StarCom Racing	Chevrolet	27.861
36	13	David Starr (i)	MBM Motorsports	Toyota	27.874
37	52	Josh Bilicki	Rick Ware Racing	Ford	27.887
38	15	Garrett Smithley (i)	Rick Ware Racing	Chevrolet	28.243
39	66	Timmy Hill (i)	MBM Motorsports	Toyota	0.000
Official qualifying results

== Race ==
=== Stage Results ===
Source: (Note: Kyle Larson, Martin Truex Jr., Denny Hamlin, and Chase Elliott were ineligible for stage points because of their participation in the Championship 4.)

Stage One Laps: 75

Pos	No	Driver	Team	Manufacturer	Points
1	19	Martin Truex Jr. (CC)	Joe Gibbs Racing	Toyota	0
2	4	Kevin Harvick	Stewart-Haas Racing	Ford	9
3	9	Chase Elliott (CC)	Hendrick Motorsports	Chevrolet	0
4	11	Denny Hamlin (CC)	Joe Gibbs Racing	Toyota	0
5	5	Kyle Larson (CC)	Hendrick Motorsports	Chevrolet	0
6	24	William Byron	Hendrick Motorsports	Chevrolet	5
7	41	Cole Custer	Stewart-Haas Racing	Ford	4
8	12	Ryan Blaney	Team Penske	Ford	3
9	1	Kurt Busch	Chip Ganassi Racing	Chevrolet	2
10	21	Matt DiBenedetto	Wood Brothers Racing	Ford	1
Official stage one results

Stage Two Laps: 115

Pos	No	Driver	Team	Manufacturer	Points
1	5	Kyle Larson (CC)	Hendrick Motorsports	Chevrolet	0
2	9	Chase Elliott (CC)	Hendrick Motorsports	Chevrolet	0
3	11	Denny Hamlin (CC)	Joe Gibbs Racing	Toyota	0
4	19	Martin Truex Jr. (CC)	Joe Gibbs Racing	Toyota	0
5	12	Ryan Blaney	Team Penske	Ford	6
6	4	Kevin Harvick	Stewart-Haas Racing	Ford	5
7	2	Brad Keselowski	Team Penske	Ford	4
8	18	Kyle Busch	Joe Gibbs Racing	Toyota	3
9	22	Joey Logano	Team Penske	Ford	2
10	24	William Byron	Hendrick Motorsports	Chevrolet	1
Official stage two results

=== Final Stage Results ===
Stage Three Laps: 122

Pos	Grid	No	Driver	Team	Manufacturer	Laps	Points
1	1	5	Kyle Larson (CC)	Hendrick Motorsports	Chevrolet	312	40
2	12	19	Martin Truex Jr. (CC)	Joe Gibbs Racing	Toyota	312	35
3	6	11	Denny Hamlin (CC)	Joe Gibbs Racing	Toyota	312	34
4	4	12	Ryan Blaney	Team Penske	Ford	312	42
5	2	9	Chase Elliott (CC)	Hendrick Motorsports	Chevrolet	312	32
6	18	10	Aric Almirola	Stewart-Haas Racing	Ford	312	31
7	13	18	Kyle Busch	Joe Gibbs Racing	Toyota	312	33
8	9	4	Kevin Harvick	Stewart-Haas Racing	Ford	312	43
9	8	20	Christopher Bell	Joe Gibbs Racing	Toyota	312	28
10	11	2	Brad Keselowski	Team Penske	Ford	312	31
11	10	22	Joey Logano	Team Penske	Ford	312	28
12	15	21	Matt DiBenedetto	Wood Brothers Racing	Ford	312	26
13	7	41	Cole Custer	Stewart-Haas Racing	Ford	312	28
14	16	42	Ross Chastain	Chip Ganassi Racing	Chevrolet	312	23
15	23	3	Austin Dillon	Richard Childress Racing	Chevrolet	312	22
16	5	1	Kurt Busch	Chip Ganassi Racing	Chevrolet	312	23
17	3	24	William Byron	Hendrick Motorsports	Chevrolet	312	26
18	14	48	Alex Bowman	Hendrick Motorsports	Chevrolet	312	19
19	20	8	Tyler Reddick	Richard Childress Racing	Chevrolet	312	18
20	31	37	Ryan Preece	JTG Daugherty Racing	Chevrolet	312	17
21	17	99	Daniel Suárez	Trackhouse Racing Team	Chevrolet	312	16
22	27	43	Erik Jones	Richard Petty Motrsports	Chevrolet	312	15
23	19	6	Ryan Newman	Roush Fenway Racing	Ford	312	14
24	28	34	Michael McDowell	Front Row Motorsports	Ford	312	13
25	26	17	Chris Buescher	Roush Fenway Racing	Ford	311	12
26	29	77	Justin Haley (i)	Spire Motorsports	Chevrolet	310	0
27	32	78	B. J. McLeod (i)	Live Fast Motorsports	Ford	309	0
28	33	51	Cody Ware (i)	Petty Ware Racing	Chevrolet	306	0
29	34	53	Joey Gase (i)	Rick Ware Racing	Chevrolet	303	0
30	37	52	Josh Bilicki (i)	Rick Ware Racing	Ford	303	0
31	38	15	Garrett Smithley (i)	Rick Ware Racing	Chevrolet	301	0
32	24	7	Corey LaJoie	Spire Motorsports	Chevrolet	281	5
33	36	13	David Starr (i)	MBM Motorsports	Toyota	273	0
34	30	38	Anthony Alfredo (R)	Front Row Motorsports	Ford	242	3
35	22	14	Chase Briscoe (R)	Stewart-Haas Racing	Ford	153	2
36	21	47	Ricky Stenhouse Jr.	JTG Daugherty Racing	Chevrolet	140	1
37	35	00	Quin Houff	StarCom Racing	Chevrolet	122	1
38	39	66	Timmy Hill (i)	MBM Motorsports	Toyota	57	0
39	25	23	Bubba Wallace	23XI Racing	Toyota	5	1
Official race results

=== Race statistics ===
- Lead changes: 18 among 7 different drivers
- Cautions/Laps: 9 for 51
- Red flags: 0
- Time of race: 3 hours, 6 minutes and 33 seconds
- Average speed: 100.348 miles per hour (161.494 km/h)

== Media ==
=== Television ===
NBC Sports covered the race on the television side. Rick Allen, two–time Phoenix winner Jeff Burton, Steve Letarte and three-time Phoenix winner Dale Earnhardt Jr. called the race from the broadcast booth. Dave Burns, Parker Kligerman, Marty Snider and Kelli Stavast handled the pit road duties from pit lane. Rutledge Wood handled the features from the track.

NBC
Booth announcers	Pit reporters	Features reporter
Lap-by-lap: Rick Allen; Color-commentator: Jeff Burton; Color-commentator: Steve Letarte; Color-commentator: Dale Earnhardt Jr.	Dave Burns; Parker Kligerman; Marty Snider; Kelli Stavast	Rutledge Wood

=== Radio ===
MRN covered the radio call for the race, which was also simulcast on Sirius XM NASCAR Radio. Alex Hayden, Jeff Striegle and Rusty Wallace called the action from the broadcast booth when the field raced down the front straightaway. Dave Moody called the action from turns 1 & 2 and Mike Bagley called the action from turns 3 & 4. Steve Post and Kim Coon covered the action for MRN from pit lane.

MRN
Booth announcers	Turn announcers	Pit reporters
Lead announcer: Alex Hayden; Announcer: Jeff Striegle; Announcer: Rusty Wallace	Turns 1 & 2: Dave Moody; Turns 3 & 4: Mike Bagley	Steve Post; Kim Coon

== Standings after the race ==
Drivers' Championship standings

	Pos	Driver	Points
	1	Kyle Larson	5,040
1	2	Martin Truex Jr.	5,035 (–5)
1	3	Denny Hamlin	5,034 (–6)
2	4	Chase Elliott	5,032 (–8)
1	5	Kevin Harvick	2,361 (–2,679)
1	6	Brad Keselowski	2,354 (–2,686)
	7	Ryan Blaney	2,350 (–2,690)
	8	Joey Logano	2,336 (–2,704)
	9	Kyle Busch	2,318 (–2,722)
	10	William Byron	2,306 (–2,734)
	11	Kurt Busch	2,297 (–2,743)
	12	Christopher Bell	2,279 (–2,761)
	13	Tyler Reddick	2,250 (–2,790)
	14	Alex Bowman	2,240 (–2,800)
	15	Aric Almirola	2,215 (–2,825)
	16	Michael McDowell	2,152 (–2,888)
Official driver's standings

Manufacturers' Championship standings

Pos	Manufacturer	Points
1	Chevrolet	1,336
2	Toyota	1,239 (–97)
3	Ford	1,236 (–100)

- Note: Only the first 16 positions are included for the driver standings.

== Notes ==
Previous race: 2021 Xfinity 500	NASCAR Cup Series; 2021 season	Next race: 2022 Daytona 500
