= 2022 A-GAME 200 =

Tenth race of the 2022 NASCAR Xfinity Series

Race details
- Race 10 of 33 of the 2022 NASCAR Xfinity Series
- Date: April 30, 2022
- Official name: 41st Annual A-GAME 200
- Location: Dover, Delaware, Dover Motor Speedway
- Course: Permanent racing facility
- Course length: 1 miles (1.6 km)
- Distance: 200 laps, 200 mi (321.868 km)
- Scheduled distance: 200 laps, 200 mi (321.868 km)
- Average speed: 104.091 mph (167.518 km/h)

Pole position
Driver	Brandon Jones	Joe Gibbs Racing
- Time: 22.872

Most laps led
Driver	Justin Allgaier	JR Motorsports
- Laps: 67

Winner
No. 8	Josh Berry	JR Motorsports

Television in the United States
- Network: Fox Sports 1
- Announcers: Adam Alexander, Brad Keselowski, Joey Logano

Radio in the United States
- Radio: Motor Racing Network

The 2022 A-GAME 200 was the 10th stock car race of the 2022 NASCAR Xfinity Series season, the 41st iteration of the event, and the fourth and final race of the Dash 4 Cash. The race was held on April 30, 2022, in Dover, Delaware at Dover Motor Speedway, a 1 mile (1.6 km) permanent oval-shaped racetrack. The race was contested over 200 laps. The final Dash 4 Cash in this race is consisted of Noah Gragson, Landon Cassill, A. J. Allmendinger, and Ryan Sieg, since they were the highest finishing Xfinity regulars after Talladega Superspeedway. At race's end, Josh Berry of JR Motorsports would take the win, after leading 55 laps. This was Berry's second career Xfinity Series win, and his first of the season. To fill out the podium, Justin Allgaier of JR Motorsports and Ty Gibbs of Joe Gibbs Racing would finish 2nd and 3rd, respectively. Noah Gragson would win the Dash 4 Cash, after finishing in front of Cassill, Allmendinger, and Sieg.

== Background ==
Dover Motor Speedway (formerly Dover Downs International Speedway and later Dover International Speedway) is a race track in Dover, Delaware, United States. The track has hosted at least one NASCAR Cup Series race each year since 1969, including two per year from 1971 to 2020. In addition to NASCAR, the track also hosted USAC and the Indy Racing League. The track features one layout, a 1 mile (1.6 km) concrete oval, with 24° banking in the turns and 9° banking on the straights. The speedway is owned and operated by Speedway Motorsports.

The track, nicknamed "The Monster Mile", was built in 1969 by Melvin Joseph of Melvin L. Joseph Construction Company, Inc., with an asphalt surface, but was replaced with concrete in 1995. Six years later in 2001, the track's capacity increased to 135,000 seats, giving the track the largest seating capacity of any sports venue in the mid-Atlantic region. In 2002, the name changed to Dover International Speedway from Dover Downs International Speedway after Dover Downs Gaming and Entertainment split, making Dover Motorsports. From 2007 to 2009, the speedway worked on an improvement project called "The Monster Makeover", which expanded facilities at the track and beautified the track. Depending on configuration, the track's capacity is at 95,500 seats. Its grand total maximum capacity was at 135,000 spectators. On November 8, 2021, it was announced that Dover Motorsports Inc. was purchased by Speedway Motorsports Inc.; effectively making Dover International Speedway a SMI track with the track being renamed to its current name.

=== Entry list ===
- (R) denotes rookie driver.
- (i) denotes driver who is ineligible for series driver points.

#	Driver	Team	Make
1	Sam Mayer	JR Motorsports	Chevrolet
02	Brett Moffitt	Our Motorsports	Chevrolet
2	Sheldon Creed (R)	Richard Childress Racing	Chevrolet
4	Bayley Currey	JD Motorsports	Chevrolet
5	Matt Mills	B. J. McLeod Motorsports	Chevrolet
6	Ryan Vargas	JD Motorsports	Chevrolet
07	Joe Graf Jr.	SS-Green Light Racing	Ford
7	Justin Allgaier	JR Motorsports	Chevrolet
08	David Starr	SS-Green Light Racing	Ford
8	Josh Berry	JR Motorsports	Chevrolet
9	Noah Gragson	JR Motorsports	Chevrolet
10	Landon Cassill	Kaulig Racing	Chevrolet
11	Daniel Hemric	Kaulig Racing	Chevrolet
13	Chad Finchum	MBM Motorsports	Toyota
16	A. J. Allmendinger	Kaulig Racing	Chevrolet
18	John Hunter Nemechek (i)	Joe Gibbs Racing	Toyota
19	Brandon Jones	Joe Gibbs Racing	Toyota
21	Austin Hill (R)	Richard Childress Racing	Chevrolet
23	Anthony Alfredo	Our Motorsports	Chevrolet
26	Chandler Smith (i)	Sam Hunt Racing	Toyota
27	Jeb Burton	Our Motorsports	Chevrolet
31	Myatt Snider	Jordan Anderson Racing	Chevrolet
34	Kyle Weatherman	Jesse Iwuji Motorsports	Chevrolet
35	Patrick Emerling	Emerling-Gase Motorsports	Chevrolet
36	Alex Labbé	DGM Racing	Chevrolet
38	Parker Retzlaff	RSS Racing	Ford
39	Ryan Sieg	RSS Racing	Ford
44	Rajah Caruth	Alpha Prime Racing	Chevrolet
45	Ryan Ellis	Alpha Prime Racing	Chevrolet
47	Brennan Poole	Mike Harmon Racing	Chevrolet
48	Kaz Grala (i)	Big Machine Racing	Chevrolet
51	Jeremy Clements	Jeremy Clements Racing	Chevrolet
54	Ty Gibbs	Joe Gibbs Racing	Toyota
66	J. J. Yeley	MBM Motorsports	Toyota
68	Brandon Brown	Brandonbilt Motorsports	Chevrolet
78	Josh Williams	B. J. McLeod Motorsports	Chevrolet
91	Mason Massey	DGM Racing	Chevrolet
98	Riley Herbst	Stewart-Haas Racing	Ford
99	Stefan Parsons	B. J. McLeod Motorsports	Chevrolet
Official entry list

== Practice ==
The only 30-minute practice session was held on Friday, April 29, at 3:00 PM EST. Brandon Jones of Joe Gibbs Racing was the fastest in the session, with a time of 23.428 seconds and a speed of 153.662 mph (247.295 km/h).

=== Full qualifying results ===
Pos.	#	Driver	Team	Make	Time	Speed
1	19	Brandon Jones	Joe Gibbs Racing	Toyota	23.428	153.662
2	18	John Hunter Nemechek (i)	Joe Gibbs Racing	Toyota	23.473	153.368
3	98	Riley Herbst	Stewart-Haas Racing	Ford	23.515	153.094

== Qualifying ==
Qualifying was held on Friday, April 29, at 3:30 PM EST. Since Dover Motor Speedway is an oval track, the qualifying system used is a single-car, two-lap system with only one round. Whoever sets the fastest time in the round wins the pole.

Brandon Jones of Joe Gibbs Racing scored the pole for the race, with a time of 22.872 seconds and a speed of 157.398 mph (253.308 km/h).

Pos.	#	Driver	Team	Make	Time	Speed
1	19	Brandon Jones	Joe Gibbs Racing	Toyota	22.872	157.398
2	1	Sam Mayer	JR Motorsports	Chevrolet	22.923	157.048
3	9	Noah Gragson	JR Motorsports	Chevrolet	23.018	156.399
4	8	Josh Berry	JR Motorsports	Chevrolet	23.023	156.365
5	54	Ty Gibbs	Joe Gibbs Racing	Toyota	23.075	156.013
6	98	Riley Herbst	Stewart-Haas Racing	Ford	23.114	155.750
7	7	Justin Allgaier	JR Motorsports	Chevrolet	23.157	155.461
8	16	A. J. Allmendinger	Kaulig Racing	Chevrolet	23.182	155.293
9	18	John Hunter Nemechek (i)	Joe Gibbs Racing	Toyota	23.223	155.019
10	23	Anthony Alfredo	Our Motorsports	Chevrolet	23.262	154.759
11	2	Sheldon Creed (R)	Richard Childress Racing	Chevrolet	23.279	154.646
12	26	Chandler Smith (i)	Sam Hunt Racing	Toyota	23.324	154.347
13	27	Jeb Burton	Our Motorsports	Chevrolet	23.344	154.215
14	4	Bayley Currey	JD Motorsports	Chevrolet	23.387	153.932
15	44	Rajah Caruth	Alpha Prime Racing	Chevrolet	23.406	153.807
16	02	Brett Moffitt	Our Motorsports	Chevrolet	23.409	153.787
17	11	Daniel Hemric	Kaulig Racing	Chevrolet	23.426	153.675
18	10	Landon Cassill	Kaulig Racing	Chevrolet	23.455	153.485
19	36	Alex Labbé	DGM Racing	Chevrolet	23.459	153.459
20	21	Austin Hill (R)	Richard Childress Racing	Chevrolet	23.464	153.427
21	48	Kaz Grala (i)	Big Machine Racing	Chevrolet	23.480	153.322
22	68	Brandon Brown	Brandonbilt Motorsports	Chevrolet	23.583	152.652
23	38	Parker Retzlaff	RSS Racing	Ford	23.621	152.407
24	51	Jeremy Clements	Jeremy Clements Racing	Chevrolet	23.672	152.078
25	31	Myatt Snider	Jordan Anderson Racing	Chevrolet	23.716	151.796
26	6	Ryan Vargas	JD Motorsports	Chevrolet	23.733	151.688
27	08	David Starr	SS-Green Light Racing	Ford	23.777	151.407
28	45	Ryan Ellis	Alpha Prime Racing	Chevrolet	23.781	151.381
29	34	Kyle Weatherman	Jesse Iwuji Motorsports	Chevrolet	23.786	151.350
30	99	Stefan Parsons	B. J. McLeod Motorsports	Chevrolet	23.795	151.292
31	66	J. J. Yeley	MBM Motorsports	Toyota	23.803	151.241
32	07	Joe Graf Jr.	SS-Green Light Racing	Ford	23.822	151.121
33	78	Josh Williams	B. J. McLeod Motorsports	Chevrolet	23.960	150.250
Qualified by owner's points
34	91	Mason Massey	DGM Racing	Chevrolet	23.974	150.163
35	13	Chad Finchum	MBM Motorsports	Toyota	24.721	145.625
36	35	Patrick Emerling	Emerling-Gase Motorsports	Chevrolet	25.033	143.810
37	5	Matt Mills	B. J. McLeod Motorsports	Chevrolet	26.554	135.573
38	39	Ryan Sieg	RSS Racing	Ford	—	—
Failed to qualify
39	47	Brennan Poole	Mike Harmon Racing	Chevrolet	—	—
Official qualifying results
Official starting lineup

== Race results ==
Stage 1 Laps: 25

Pos.	#	Driver	Team	Make	Pts
1	1	Sam Mayer	JR Motorsports	Chevrolet	10
2	7	Justin Allgaier	JR Motorsports	Chevrolet	9
3	8	Josh Berry	JR Motorsports	Chevrolet	8
4	19	Brandon Jones	Joe Gibbs Racing	Toyota	7
5	18	John Hunter Nemechek (i)	Joe Gibbs Racing	Toyota	0
6	54	Ty Gibbs	Joe Gibbs Racing	Toyota	5
7	16	A. J. Allmendinger	Kaulig Racing	Chevrolet	4
8	9	Noah Gragson	JR Motorsports	Chevrolet	3
9	98	Riley Herbst	Stewart-Haas Racing	Ford	2
10	2	Sheldon Creed (R)	Richard Childress Racing	Chevrolet	1

Stage 2 Laps: 25

Pos.	#	Driver	Team	Make	Pts
1	7	Justin Allgaier	JR Motorsports	Chevrolet	10
2	19	Brandon Jones	Joe Gibbs Racing	Toyota	9
3	16	A. J. Allmendinger	Kaulig Racing	Chevrolet	8
4	8	Josh Berry	JR Motorsports	Chevrolet	7
5	54	Ty Gibbs	Joe Gibbs Racing	Toyota	6
6	98	Riley Herbst	Stewart-Haas Racing	Ford	5
7	9	Noah Gragson	JR Motorsports	Chevrolet	4
8	11	Daniel Hemric	Kaulig Racing	Chevrolet	3
9	2	Sheldon Creed (R)	Richard Childress Racing	Chevrolet	2
10	21	Austin Hill (R)	Richard Childress Racing	Chevrolet	1

Stage 3 Laps: 110

Fin.	St	#	Driver	Team	Make	Laps	Led	Status	Points
1	4	8	Josh Berry	JR Motorsports	Chevrolet	200	55	Running	55
2	7	7	Justin Allgaier	JR Motorsports	Chevrolet	200	67	Running	54
3	5	54	Ty Gibbs	Joe Gibbs Racing	Toyota	200	1	Running	45
4	3	9	Noah Gragson	JR Motorsports	Chevrolet	200	0	Running	40
5	2	1	Sam Mayer	JR Motorsports	Chevrolet	200	18	Running	42
6	8	16	A. J. Allmendinger	Kaulig Racing	Chevrolet	200	0	Running	43
7	1	19	Brandon Jones	Joe Gibbs Racing	Toyota	200	59	Running	46
8	11	2	Sheldon Creed (R)	Richard Childress Racing	Chevrolet	200	0	Running	32
9	6	98	Riley Herbst	Stewart-Haas Racing	Ford	200	0	Running	35
10	38	39	Ryan Sieg	RSS Racing	Ford	200	0	Running	27
11	17	11	Daniel Hemric	Kaulig Racing	Chevrolet	200	0	Running	29
12	18	10	Landon Cassill	Kaulig Racing	Chevrolet	200	0	Running	25
13	16	02	Brett Moffitt	Our Motorsports	Chevrolet	200	0	Running	24
14	20	21	Austin Hill (R)	Richard Childress Racing	Chevrolet	200	0	Running	24
15	10	23	Anthony Alfredo	Our Motorsports	Chevrolet	200	0	Running	22
16	13	27	Jeb Burton	Our Motorsports	Chevrolet	200	0	Running	21
17	23	38	Parker Retzlaff	RSS Racing	Ford	200	0	Running	20
18	22	68	Brandon Brown	Brandonbilt Motorsports	Chevrolet	199	0	Running	19
19	19	36	Alex Labbé	DGM Racing	Chevrolet	199	0	Running	18
20	28	45	Ryan Ellis	Alpha Prime Racing	Chevrolet	199	0	Running	17
21	12	26	Chandler Smith (i)	Sam Hunt Racing	Toyota	199	0	Running	0
22	25	31	Myatt Snider	Jordan Anderson Racing	Chevrolet	199	0	Running	15
23	31	66	J. J. Yeley	MBM Motorsports	Toyota	198	0	Running	14
24	21	48	Kaz Grala (i)	Big Machine Racing	Chevrolet	198	0	Running	0
25	33	78	Josh Williams	B. J. McLeod Motorsports	Chevrolet	197	0	Running	12
26	26	6	Ryan Vargas	JD Motorsports	Chevrolet	197	0	Running	11
27	29	34	Kyle Weatherman	Jesse Iwuji Motorsports	Chevrolet	197	0	Running	10
28	32	07	Joe Graf Jr.	SS-Green Light Racing	Ford	196	0	Running	9
29	24	51	Jeremy Clements	Jeremy Clements Racing	Chevrolet	195	0	Running	8
30	30	99	Stefan Parsons	B. J. McLeod Motorsports	Chevrolet	195	0	Running	7
31	37	5	Matt Mills	B. J. McLeod Motorsports	Chevrolet	195	0	Running	6
32	35	13	Chad Finchum	MBM Motorsports	Toyota	194	0	Running	5
33	36	35	Patrick Emerling	Emerling-Gase Motorsports	Chevrolet	192	0	Running	4
34	34	91	Mason Massey	DGM Racing	Chevrolet	191	0	Running	3
35	27	08	David Starr	SS-Green Light Racing	Ford	189	0	Running	2
36	14	4	Bayley Currey	JD Motorsports	Chevrolet	154	0	Engine	1
37	9	18	John Hunter Nemechek (i)	Joe Gibbs Racing	Toyota	83	0	Brakes	0
38	15	44	Rajah Caruth	Alpha Prime Racing	Chevrolet	58	0	Suspension	1
Official race results

== Standings after the race ==
Drivers' Championship standings

Pos	Driver	Points
1	A. J. Allmendinger	427
2	Ty Gibbs	384 (-43)
3	Noah Gragson	384 (-43)
4	Josh Berry	339 (-88)
5	Brandon Jones	317 (-110)
6	Justin Allgaier	317 (-110)
7	Sam Mayer	297 (-130)
8	Ryan Sieg	287 (-140)
9	Riley Herbst	277 (-150)
10	Austin Hill	274 (-153)
11	Landon Cassill	265 (-162)
12	Daniel Hemric	259 (-168)
Official driver's standings

- Note: Only the first 12 positions are included for the driver standings.

Previous race: 2022 Ag-Pro 300	NASCAR Xfinity Series; 2022 season	Next race: 2022 Mahindra ROXOR 200
