= 2021 Hollywood Casino 400 =

NASCAR Cup Series race

Race details
- Race 34 of 36 in the 2021 NASCAR Cup Series
- Date: October 24, 2021
- Location: Kansas Speedway in Kansas City, Kansas
- Course: Permanent racing facility
- Course length: 1.5 miles (2.4 km)
- Distance: 267 laps, 400.5 mi (640.8 km)
- Average speed: 130.728 miles per hour (210.386 km/h)

Pole position
Driver	Kyle Larson	Hendrick Motorsports
- Grid positions set by competition-based formula

Most laps led
Driver	Kyle Larson	Hendrick Motorsports
- Laps: 131

Winner
No. 5	Kyle Larson	Hendrick Motorsports

Television in the United States
- Network: NBCSN
- Announcers: Rick Allen, Jeff Burton, Steve Letarte and Dale Earnhardt Jr.

Radio in the United States
- Radio: MRN
- Booth announcers: Alex Hayden, Jeff Striegle and Rusty Wallace
- Turn announcers: Dave Moody (1 & 2) and Mike Bagley (3 & 4)

The 2021 Hollywood Casino 400 was a NASCAR Cup Series race held on October 24, 2021, at Kansas Speedway in Kansas City, Kansas. Contested over 267 laps on the 1.5 mi (2.4 km) intermediate speedway, it was the 34th race of the 2021 NASCAR Cup Series season, the eighth race of the Playoffs, and second race of the Round of 8.

== Report ==
=== Background ===
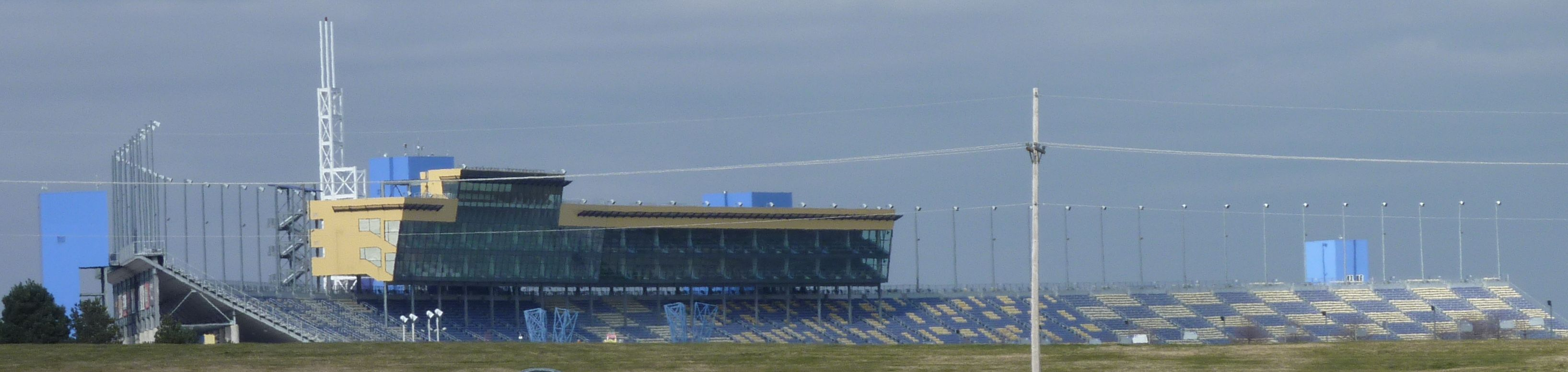
Kansas Speedway, the track where the race was held.

The 2021 Hollywood Casino 400 program cover.

Kansas Speedway is a 1.5-mile (2.4 km) tri-oval race track in Kansas City, Kansas. It was built in 2001 and it currently hosts two annual NASCAR race weekends. The Verizon IndyCar Series also raced at here until 2011. The speedway is owned and operated by the International Speedway Corporation.

==== Entry list ====
- (R) denotes rookie driver.
- (i) denotes driver who are ineligible for series driver points.

No.	Driver	Team	Manufacturer
00	Quin Houff	StarCom Racing	Chevrolet
1	Kurt Busch	Chip Ganassi Racing	Chevrolet
2	Brad Keselowski	Team Penske	Ford
3	Austin Dillon	Richard Childress Racing	Chevrolet
4	Kevin Harvick	Stewart-Haas Racing	Ford
5	Kyle Larson	Hendrick Motorsports	Chevrolet
6	Ryan Newman	Roush Fenway Racing	Ford
7	Corey LaJoie	Spire Motorsports	Chevrolet
8	Tyler Reddick	Richard Childress Racing	Chevrolet
9	Chase Elliott	Hendrick Motorsports	Chevrolet
10	Aric Almirola	Stewart-Haas Racing	Ford
11	Denny Hamlin	Joe Gibbs Racing	Toyota
12	Ryan Blaney	Team Penske	Ford
13	David Starr (i)	MBM Motorsports	Ford
14	Chase Briscoe (R)	Stewart-Haas Racing	Ford
15	Ryan Ellis (i)	Rick Ware Racing	Chevrolet
17	Chris Buescher	Roush Fenway Racing	Ford
18	Kyle Busch	Joe Gibbs Racing	Toyota
19	Martin Truex Jr.	Joe Gibbs Racing	Toyota
20	Christopher Bell	Joe Gibbs Racing	Toyota
21	Matt DiBenedetto	Wood Brothers Racing	Ford
22	Joey Logano	Team Penske	Ford
23	Bubba Wallace	23XI Racing	Toyota
24	William Byron	Hendrick Motorsports	Chevrolet
34	Michael McDowell	Front Row Motorsports	Ford
37	Ryan Preece	JTG Daugherty Racing	Chevrolet
38	Anthony Alfredo (R)	Front Row Motorsports	Ford
41	Cole Custer	Stewart-Haas Racing	Ford
42	Ross Chastain	Chip Ganassi Racing	Chevrolet
43	Erik Jones	Richard Petty Motorsports	Chevrolet
47	Ricky Stenhouse Jr.	JTG Daugherty Racing	Chevrolet
48	Alex Bowman	Hendrick Motorsports	Chevrolet
51	Cody Ware (i)	Petty Ware Racing	Chevrolet
52	Josh Bilicki (i)	Rick Ware Racing	Ford
53	Joey Gase (i)	Rick Ware Racing	Chevrolet
66	Chad Finchum (i)	MBM Motorsports	Toyota
77	Justin Haley (i)	Spire Motorsports	Chevrolet
78	B. J. McLeod (i)	Live Fast Motorsports	Ford
96	Parker Kligerman (i)	Gaunt Brothers Racing	Toyota
99	Daniel Suárez	Trackhouse Racing Team	Chevrolet
Official entry list

== Qualifying ==
Kyle Larson was awarded the pole for the race as determined by competition-based formula.

=== Starting Lineup ===
Pos	No.	Driver	Team	Manufacturer
1	5	Kyle Larson	Hendrick Motorsports	Chevrolet
2	12	Ryan Blaney	Team Penske	Ford
3	2	Brad Keselowski	Team Penske	Ford
4	18	Kyle Busch	Joe Gibbs Racing	Toyota
5	9	Chase Elliott	Hendrick Motorsports	Chevrolet
6	11	Denny Hamlin	Joe Gibbs Racing	Toyota
7	19	Martin Truex Jr.	Joe Gibbs Racing	Toyota
8	22	Joey Logano	Team Penske	Ford
9	24	William Byron	Hendrick Motorsports	Chevrolet
10	20	Christopher Bell	Joe Gibbs Racing	Toyota
11	4	Kevin Harvick	Stewart-Haas Racing	Ford
12	8	Tyler Reddick	Richard Childress Racing	Chevrolet
13	1	Kurt Busch	Chip Ganassi Racing	Chevrolet
14	3	Austin Dillon	Richard Childress Racing	Chevrolet
15	21	Matt DiBenedetto	Wood Brothers Racing	Ford
16	99	Daniel Suárez	Trackhouse Racing Team	Chevrolet
17	43	Erik Jones	Richard Petty Motorsports	Chevrolet
18	34	Michael McDowell	Front Row Motorsports	Ford
19	14	Chase Briscoe (R)	Stewart-Haas Racing	Ford
20	10	Aric Almirola	Stewart-Haas Racing	Ford
21	17	Chris Buescher	Roush Fenway Racing	Ford
22	41	Cole Custer	Stewart-Haas Racing	Ford
23	7	Corey LaJoie	Spire Motorsports	Chevrolet
24	42	Ross Chastain	Chip Ganassi Racing	Chevrolet
25	48	Alex Bowman	Hendrick Motorsports	Chevrolet
26	78	B. J. McLeod (i)	Live Fast Motorsports	Ford
27	23	Bubba Wallace	23XI Racing	Toyota
28	47	Ricky Stenhouse Jr.	JTG Daugherty Racing	Chevrolet
29	38	Anthony Alfredo (R)	Front Row Motorsports	Ford
30	52	Josh Bilicki (i)	Rick Ware Racing	Ford
31	6	Ryan Newman	Roush Fenway Racing	Ford
32	37	Ryan Preece	JTG Daugherty Racing	Chevrolet
33	77	Justin Haley (i)	Spire Motorsports	Chevrolet
34	15	Ryan Ellis (i)	Rick Ware Racing	Chevrolet
35	00	Quin Houff	StarCom Racing	Chevrolet
36	51	Cody Ware (i)	Petty Ware Racing	Chevrolet
37	66	Chad Finchum (i)	MBM Motorsports	Toyota
38	13	David Starr (i)	MBM Motorsports	Ford
39	53	Joey Gase (i)	Rick Ware Racing	Chevrolet
40	96	Parker Kligerman (i)	Gaunt Brothers Racing	Toyota
Official starting lineup

== Race ==
=== Stage Results ===
Stage One Laps: 80

Pos	No	Driver	Team	Manufacturer	Points
1	5	Kyle Larson	Hendrick Motorsports	Chevrolet	10
2	24	William Byron	Hendrick Motorsports	Chevrolet	9
3	9	Chase Elliott	Hendrick Motorsports	Chevrolet	8
4	1	Kurt Busch	Chip Ganassi Racing	Chevrolet	7
5	11	Denny Hamlin	Joe Gibbs Racing	Toyota	6
6	4	Kevin Harvick	Stewart-Haas Racing	Ford	5
7	48	Alex Bowman	Hendrick Motorsports	Chevrolet	4
8	42	Ross Chastain	Chip Ganassi Racing	Chevrolet	3
9	18	Kyle Busch	Joe Gibbs Racing	Toyota	2
10	8	Tyler Reddick	Richard Childress Racing	Chevrolet	1
Official stage one results

Stage Two Laps: 80

Pos	No	Driver	Team	Manufacturer	Points
1	24	William Byron	Hendrick Motorsports	Chevrolet	10
2	9	Chase Elliott	Hendrick Motorsports	Chevrolet	9
3	5	Kyle Larson	Hendrick Motorsports	Chevrolet	8
4	1	Kurt Busch	Chip Ganassi Racing	Chevrolet	7
5	4	Kevin Harvick	Stewart-Haas Racing	Ford	6
6	8	Tyler Reddick	Richard Childress Racing	Chevrolet	5
7	48	Alex Bowman	Hendrick Motorsports	Chevrolet	4
8	11	Denny Hamlin	Joe Gibbs Racing	Toyota	3
9	23	Bubba Wallace	23XI Racing	Toyota	2
10	42	Ross Chastain	Chip Ganassi Racing	Chevrolet	1
Official stage two results

=== Final Stage Results ===
Stage Three Laps: 107

Pos	Grid	No	Driver	Team	Manufacturer	Laps	Points
1	1	5	Kyle Larson	Hendrick Motorsports	Chevrolet	267	58
2	5	9	Chase Elliott	Hendrick Motorsports	Chevrolet	267	52
3	11	4	Kevin Harvick	Stewart-Haas Racing	Ford	267	45
4	13	1	Kurt Busch	Chip Ganassi Racing	Chevrolet	267	47
5	6	11	Denny Hamlin	Joe Gibbs Racing	Toyota	267	41
6	9	24	William Byron	Hendrick Motorsports	Chevrolet	267	50
7	7	19	Martin Truex Jr.	Joe Gibbs Racing	Toyota	267	30
8	10	20	Christopher Bell	Joe Gibbs Racing	Toyota	267	29
9	8	22	Joey Logano	Team Penske	Ford	267	28
10	14	3	Austin Dillon	Richard Childress Racing	Chevrolet	267	27
11	25	48	Alex Bowman	Hendrick Motorsports	Chevrolet	267	34
12	21	17	Chris Buescher	Roush Fenway Racing	Ford	267	25
13	24	42	Ross Chastain	Chip Ganassi Racing	Chevrolet	267	28
14	27	23	Bubba Wallace	23XI Racing	Toyota	267	25
15	16	99	Daniel Suárez	Trackhouse Racing Team	Chevrolet	267	22
16	18	34	Michael McDowell	Front Row Motorsports	Ford	266	21
17	3	2	Brad Keselowski	Team Penske	Ford	266	20
18	22	41	Cole Custer	Stewart-Haas Racing	Ford	266	19
19	19	14	Chase Briscoe (R)	Stewart-Haas Racing	Ford	266	18
20	40	96	Parker Kligerman (i)	Gaunt Brothers Racing	Toyota	266	0
21	32	37	Ryan Preece	JTG Daugherty Racing	Chevrolet	265	16
22	12	8	Tyler Reddick	Richard Childress Racing	Chevrolet	265	21
23	15	21	Matt DiBenedetto	Wood Brothers Racing	Ford	265	14
24	28	47	Ricky Stenhouse Jr.	JTG Daugherty Racing	Chevrolet	265	13
25	23	7	Corey LaJoie	Spire Motorsports	Chevrolet	263	12
26	20	10	Aric Almirola	Stewart-Haas Racing	Ford	263	11
27	31	6	Ryan Newman	Roush Fenway Racing	Ford	263	10
28	4	18	Kyle Busch	Joe Gibbs Racing	Toyota	261	11
29	17	43	Erik Jones	Richard Petty Motorsports	Chevrolet	260	8
30	26	78	B. J. McLeod (i)	Live Fast Motorsports	Ford	259	0
31	36	51	Cody Ware (i)	Petty Ware Racing	Chevrolet	258	0
32	39	53	Joey Gase (i)	Rick Ware Racing	Chevrolet	256	0
33	30	52	Josh Bilicki (i)	Rick Ware Racing	Ford	256	0
34	38	13	David Starr (i)	MBM Motorsports	Ford	255	0
35	35	00	Quin Houff	StarCom Racing	Chevrolet	255	2
36	34	15	Ryan Ellis (i)	Rick Ware Racing	Chevrolet	254	0
37	2	12	Ryan Blaney	Team Penske	Ford	224	1
38	29	38	Anthony Alfredo (R)	Front Row Motorsports	Ford	171	1
39	33	77	Justin Haley (i)	Spire Motorsports	Chevrolet	165	0
40	37	66	Chad Finchum (i)	MBM Motorsports	Toyota	47	0
Official race results

=== Race statistics ===
- Lead changes: 23 among 8 different drivers
- Cautions/Laps: 7 for 33
- Red flags: 1 for 15 minutes and 46 seconds
- Time of race: 3 hours, 3 minutes and 49 seconds
- Average speed: 130.728 miles per hour (210.386 km/h)

== Media ==
=== Television ===
NBC Sports covered the race on the television side. Rick Allen, Jeff Burton, Steve Letarte and Dale Earnhardt Jr. called the race from the broadcast booth. Dave Burns, Marty Snider and Dillon Welch handled the pit road duties from pit lane. Parker Kligerman provided updates from the driver’s perspective while competing in the No. 96 Gaunt Brothers Racing car during the race.

NBCSN
Booth announcers	Pit reporters	In-race reporter
Lap-by-lap: Rick Allen; Color-commentator: Jeff Burton; Color-commentator: Steve Letarte; Color-commentator: Dale Earnhardt Jr.	Dave Burns; Marty Snider; Dillon Welch	Parker Kligerman

=== Radio ===
MRN had the radio call for the race, which was simulcast on Sirius XM NASCAR Radio. Alex Hayden, Jeff Striegle and Rusty Wallace called the race for MRN when the field raced thru the front straightaway. Dave Moody called the race for MRN from Turns 1 & 2, and Mike Bagley called the race for MRN from turns 3 & 4. Steve Post and Kim Coon covered the action for MRN from pit lane.

MRN
Booth announcers	Turn announcers	Pit reporters
Lead announcer: Alex Hayden; Announcer: Jeff Striegle; Announcer: Rusty Wallace	Turns 1 & 2: Dave Moody; Turns 3 & 4: Mike Bagley	Steve Post; Kim Coon

== Standings after the race ==
Drivers' Championship standings

	Pos	Driver	Points
	1	Kyle Larson	4,181
3	2	Chase Elliott	4,107 (–74)
	3	Denny Hamlin	4,105 (–76)
	4	Kyle Busch	4,074 (–107)
3	5	Ryan Blaney	4,073 (–108)
1	6	Martin Truex Jr.	4,071 (–110)
1	7	Brad Keselowski	4,068 (–113)
	8	Joey Logano	4,048 (–133)
	9	Kevin Harvick	2,293 (–1,888)
1	10	Kurt Busch	2,243 (–1,938)
2	11	William Byron	2,233 (–1,948)
2	12	Christopher Bell	2,227 (–1,954)
1	13	Tyler Reddick	2,213 (–1,968)
1	14	Alex Bowman	2,169 (–2,012)
1	15	Aric Almirola	2,147 (–2,034)
	16	Michael McDowell	2,128 (–2,053)
Official driver's standings

Manufacturers' Championship standings

Pos	Manufacturer	Points
1	Chevrolet	1,256
2	Toyota	1,169 (–87)
3	Ford	1,169 (–87)

- Note: Only the first 16 positions are included for the driver standings.

Previous race: 2021 Autotrader EchoPark Automotive 500	NASCAR Cup Series; 2021 season	Next race: 2021 Xfinity 500
