= 2021 Xfinity 500 =

NASCAR Cup Series race

Race details
- Race 35 of 36 in the 2021 NASCAR Cup Series
- Date: October 31, 2021
- Location: Martinsville Speedway in Ridgeway, Virginia
- Course: Permanent racing facility
- Course length: 0.526 miles (0.847 km)
- Distance: 501 laps, 263.526 mi (424.104 km)
- Scheduled distance: 500 laps, 263 mi (423.257 km)
- Average speed: 70.968 miles per hour (114.212 km/h)

Pole position
Driver	Kyle Larson	Hendrick Motorsports
- Grid positions set by competition-based formula

Most laps led
Driver	Chase Elliott	Hendrick Motorsports
- Laps: 289

Winner
No. 48	Alex Bowman	Hendrick Motorsports

Television in the United States
- Network: NBC
- Announcers: Rick Allen, Jeff Burton, Steve Letarte and Dale Earnhardt Jr.

Radio in the United States
- Radio: MRN
- Booth announcers: Alex Hayden, Jeff Striegle and Rusty Wallace
- Turn announcers: Dave Moody (Backstretch)

The 2021 Xfinity 500 was a NASCAR Cup Series race held on October 31, 2021, at Martinsville Speedway in Ridgeway, Virginia. Contested over 501 laps—extended from 500 laps due to an overtime finish, on the 0.526-mile (0.847-kilometre) short track, it was the 35th race of the 2021 NASCAR Cup Series season, the ninth race of the Playoffs, and final race of the Round of 8. Alex Bowman moved Denny Hamlin during the closing laps to earn his fourth win in 2021, as well as his sixth overall.

== Report ==
=== Background ===
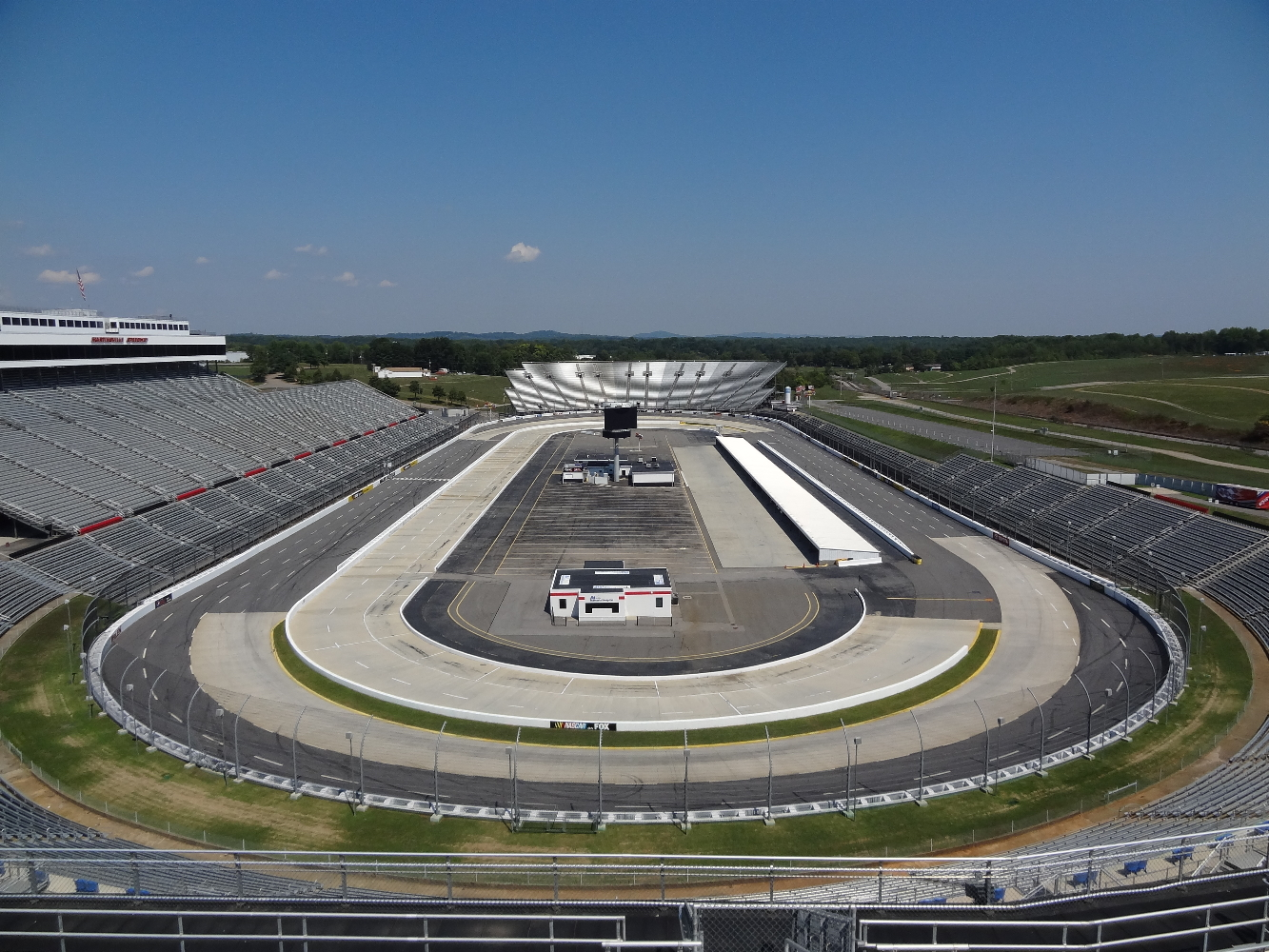
Martinsville Speedway, the track where the race was held.

The 2021 Xfinity 500 program cover.

Martinsville Speedway is an International Speedway Corporation-owned NASCAR stock car racing track located in Henry County, in Ridgeway, Virginia, just to the south of Martinsville. At 0.526 miles (0.847 km) in length, it is the shortest track in the NASCAR Cup Series. The track is also one of the first paved oval tracks in NASCAR, being built in 1947 by H. Clay Earles. It is also the only race track that has been on the NASCAR circuit from its beginning in 1948. Along with this, Martinsville is the only NASCAR oval track on the entire NASCAR track circuit to have asphalt surfaces on the straightaways, then concrete to cover the turns.

==== Entry list ====
- (R) denotes rookie driver.
- (i) denotes driver who are ineligible for series driver points.

No.	Driver	Team	Manufacturer
00	Quin Houff	StarCom Racing	Chevrolet
1	Kurt Busch	Chip Ganassi Racing	Chevrolet
2	Brad Keselowski	Team Penske	Ford
3	Austin Dillon	Richard Childress Racing	Chevrolet
4	Kevin Harvick	Stewart-Haas Racing	Ford
5	Kyle Larson	Hendrick Motorsports	Chevrolet
6	Ryan Newman	Roush Fenway Racing	Ford
7	Corey LaJoie	Spire Motorsports	Chevrolet
8	Tyler Reddick	Richard Childress Racing	Chevrolet
9	Chase Elliott	Hendrick Motorsports	Chevrolet
10	Aric Almirola	Stewart-Haas Racing	Ford
11	Denny Hamlin	Joe Gibbs Racing	Toyota
12	Ryan Blaney	Team Penske	Ford
14	Chase Briscoe (R)	Stewart-Haas Racing	Ford
15	Garrett Smithley (i)	Rick Ware Racing	Chevrolet
17	Chris Buescher	Roush Fenway Racing	Ford
18	Kyle Busch	Joe Gibbs Racing	Toyota
19	Martin Truex Jr.	Joe Gibbs Racing	Toyota
20	Christopher Bell	Joe Gibbs Racing	Toyota
21	Matt DiBenedetto	Wood Brothers Racing	Ford
22	Joey Logano	Team Penske	Ford
23	Bubba Wallace	23XI Racing	Toyota
24	William Byron	Hendrick Motorsports	Chevrolet
34	Michael McDowell	Front Row Motorsports	Ford
37	Ryan Preece	JTG Daugherty Racing	Chevrolet
38	Anthony Alfredo (R)	Front Row Motorsports	Ford
41	Cole Custer	Stewart-Haas Racing	Ford
42	Ross Chastain	Chip Ganassi Racing	Chevrolet
43	Erik Jones	Richard Petty Motorsports	Chevrolet
47	Ricky Stenhouse Jr.	JTG Daugherty Racing	Chevrolet
48	Alex Bowman	Hendrick Motorsports	Chevrolet
51	Cody Ware (i)	Petty Ware Racing	Chevrolet
52	Josh Bilicki (i)	Rick Ware Racing	Ford
53	Joey Gase (i)	Rick Ware Racing	Chevrolet
66	Timmy Hill (i)	MBM Motorsports	Toyota
77	Justin Haley (i)	Spire Motorsports	Chevrolet
78	B. J. McLeod (i)	Live Fast Motorsports	Ford
99	Daniel Suárez	Trackhouse Racing Team	Chevrolet
Official entry list

== Qualifying ==
Kyle Larson was awarded the pole for the race as determined by competition-based formula. This was the final round for the single-day race format with no practice or qualifying used since May 2020 in Darlington. Starting in 2022, NASCAR adopted the competition-based formula for determining practice groups and qualifying order, and when weather cancels qualifying.

=== Starting Lineup ===
Pos	No.	Driver	Team	Manufacturer
1	5	Kyle Larson	Hendrick Motorsports	Chevrolet
2	9	Chase Elliott	Hendrick Motorsports	Chevrolet
3	11	Denny Hamlin	Joe Gibbs Racing	Toyota
4	19	Martin Truex Jr.	Joe Gibbs Racing	Toyota
5	22	Joey Logano	Team Penske	Ford
6	2	Brad Keselowski	Team Penske	Ford
7	18	Kyle Busch	Joe Gibbs Racing	Toyota
8	12	Ryan Blaney	Team Penske	Ford
9	4	Kevin Harvick	Stewart-Haas Racing	Ford
10	1	Kurt Busch	Chip Ganassi Racing	Chevrolet
11	24	William Byron	Hendrick Motorsports	Chevrolet
12	20	Christopher Bell	Joe Gibbs Racing	Toyota
13	48	Alex Bowman	Hendrick Motorsports	Chevrolet
14	3	Austin Dillon	Richard Childress Racing	Chevrolet
15	17	Chris Buescher	Roush Fenway Racing	Ford
16	42	Ross Chastain	Chip Ganassi Racing	Chevrolet
17	23	Bubba Wallace	23XI Racing	Toyota
18	8	Tyler Reddick	Richard Childress Racing	Chevrolet
19	34	Michael McDowell	Front Row Motorsports	Ford
20	99	Daniel Suárez	Trackhouse Racing Team	Chevrolet
21	21	Matt DiBenedetto	Wood Brothers Racing	Ford
22	14	Chase Briscoe (R)	Stewart-Haas Racing	Ford
23	10	Aric Almirola	Stewart-Haas Racing	Ford
24	41	Cole Custer	Stewart-Haas Racing	Ford
25	47	Ricky Stenhouse Jr.	JTG Daugherty Racing	Chevrolet
26	37	Ryan Preece	JTG Daugherty Racing	Chevrolet
27	6	Ryan Newman	Roush Fenway Racing	Ford
28	43	Erik Jones	Richard Petty Motorsports	Chevrolet
29	7	Corey LaJoie	Spire Motorsports	Chevrolet
30	78	B. J. McLeod (i)	Live Fast Motorsports	Ford
31	51	Cody Ware (i)	Petty Ware Racing	Chevrolet
32	38	Anthony Alfredo (R)	Front Row Motorsports	Ford
33	52	Josh Bilicki (i)	Rick Ware Racing	Ford
34	53	Joey Gase (i)	Rick Ware Racing	Chevrolet
35	77	Justin Haley (i)	Spire Motorsports	Chevrolet
36	00	Quin Houff	StarCom Racing	Chevrolet
37	15	Garrett Smithley (i)	Rick Ware Racing	Chevrolet
38	66	Timmy Hill (i)	MBM Motorsports	Toyota
Official starting lineup

== Race ==
=== Stage Results ===
Stage One Laps: 130

Pos	No	Driver	Team	Manufacturer	Points
1	9	Chase Elliott	Hendrick Motorsports	Chevrolet	10
2	5	Kyle Larson	Hendrick Motorsports	Chevrolet	9
3	19	Martin Truex Jr.	Joe Gibbs Racing	Toyota	8
4	24	William Byron	Hendrick Motorsports	Chevrolet	7
5	2	Brad Keselowski	Team Penske	Ford	6
6	18	Kyle Busch	Joe Gibbs Racing	Toyota	5
7	3	Austin Dillon	Richard Childress Racing	Chevrolet	4
8	48	Alex Bowman	Hendrick Motorsports	Chevrolet	3
9	22	Joey Logano	Team Penske	Ford	2
10	10	Aric Almirola	Stewart-Haas Racing	Ford	1
Official stage one results

Stage Two Laps: 130

Pos	No	Driver	Team	Manufacturer	Points
1	9	Chase Elliott	Hendrick Motorsports	Chevrolet	10
2	48	Alex Bowman	Hendrick Motorsports	Chevrolet	9
3	24	William Byron	Hendrick Motorsports	Chevrolet	8
4	19	Martin Truex Jr.	Joe Gibbs Racing	Toyota	7
5	11	Denny Hamlin	Joe Gibbs Racing	Toyota	6
6	10	Aric Almirola	Stewart-Haas Racing	Ford	5
7	20	Christopher Bell	Joe Gibbs Racing	Toyota	4
8	2	Brad Keselowski	Team Penske	Ford	3
9	18	Kyle Busch	Joe Gibbs Racing	Toyota	2
10	1	Kurt Busch	Chip Ganassi Racing	Chevrolet	1
Official stage two results

=== Final Stage Results ===
Stage Three Laps: 240

Pos	Grid	No	Driver	Team	Manufacturer	Laps	Points
1	13	48	Alex Bowman	Hendrick Motorsports	Chevrolet	501	52
2	7	18	Kyle Busch	Joe Gibbs Racing	Toyota	501	42
3	6	2	Brad Keselowski	Team Penske	Ford	501	43
4	4	19	Martin Truex Jr.	Joe Gibbs Racing	Toyota	501	48
5	11	24	William Byron	Hendrick Motorsports	Chevrolet	501	47
6	23	10	Aric Almirola	Stewart-Haas Racing	Ford	501	37
7	10	1	Kurt Busch	Chip Ganassi Racing	Chevrolet	501	31
8	28	43	Erik Jones	Richard Petty Motorsports	Chevrolet	501	29
9	15	17	Chris Buescher	Roush Fenway Racing	Ford	501	28
10	5	22	Joey Logano	Team Penske	Ford	501	29
11	8	12	Ryan Blaney	Team Penske	Ford	501	26
12	9	4	Kevin Harvick	Stewart-Haas Racing	Ford	501	25
13	14	3	Austin Dillon	Richard Childress Racing	Chevrolet	501	28
14	1	5	Kyle Larson	Hendrick Motorsports	Chevrolet	501	32
15	21	21	Matt DiBenedetto	Wood Brothers Racing	Ford	501	22
16	2	9	Chase Elliott	Hendrick Motorsports	Chevrolet	501	41
17	12	20	Christopher Bell	Joe Gibbs Racing	Toyota	501	24
18	18	8	Tyler Reddick	Richard Childress Racing	Chevrolet	501	19
19	25	47	Ricky Stenhouse Jr.	JTG Daugherty Racing	Chevrolet	501	18
20	32	38	Anthony Alfredo (R)	Front Row Motorsports	Ford	501	17
21	29	7	Corey LaJoie	Spire Motorsports	Chevrolet	501	16
22	22	14	Chase Briscoe (R)	Stewart-Haas Racing	Ford	501	15
23	24	41	Cole Custer	Stewart-Haas Racing	Ford	501	14
24	3	11	Denny Hamlin	Joe Gibbs Racing	Toyota	501	19
25	17	23	Bubba Wallace	23XI Racing	Toyota	501	12
26	19	34	Michael McDowell	Front Row Motorsports	Ford	499	11
27	16	42	Ross Chastain	Chip Ganassi Racing	Chevrolet	498	10
28	20	99	Daniel Suárez	Trackhouse Racing Team	Chevrolet	498	9
29	30	78	B. J. McLeod (i)	Live Fast Motorsports	Ford	496	0
30	31	51	Cody Ware (i)	Petty Ware Racing	Chevrolet	495	0
31	35	77	Justin Haley (i)	Spire Motorsports	Chevrolet	492	0
32	27	6	Ryan Newman	Roush Fenway Racing	Ford	491	5
33	37	15	Garrett Smithley (i)	Rick Ware Racing	Chevrolet	490	0
34	36	00	Quin Houff	StarCom Racing	Chevrolet	483	3
35	33	52	Josh Bilicki (i)	Rick Ware Racing	Ford	483	0
36	26	37	Ryan Preece	JTG Daugherty Racing	Chevrolet	414	1
37	38	66	Timmy Hill (i)	MBM Motorsports	Toyota	206	0
38	34	53	Joey Gase (i)	Rick Ware Racing	Chevrolet	10	0
Official race results

=== Race statistics ===
- Lead changes: 15 among 7 different drivers
- Cautions/Laps: 15 for 91
- Red flags: 0
- Time of race: 3 hours, 42 minutes and 48 seconds
- Average speed: 70.968 miles per hour (114.212 km/h)

== Media ==
=== Television ===
NBC Sports covered the race on the television side. Rick Allen, 1997 race winner Jeff Burton, Steve Letarte and 2014 race winner Dale Earnhardt Jr. called the race from the broadcast booth. Dave Burns, Parker Kligerman, Marty Snider and Dillon Welch handled the pit road duties from pit lane. Rutledge Wood handled the features from the track.

NBC
Booth announcers	Pit reporters	Features reporter
Lap-by-lap: Rick Allen; Color-commentator: Jeff Burton; Color-commentator: Steve Letarte; Color-commentator: Dale Earnhardt Jr.	Dave Burns; Parker Kligerman; Marty Snider; Dillon Welch	Rutledge Wood

=== Radio ===
MRN covered the radio call for the race, which was also simulcast on Sirius XM NASCAR Radio. Alex Hayden, Jeff Striegle and 7 time Martinsville winner Rusty Wallace had the call for MRN when the field raced down the front straightaway. Dave Moody covered the action for MRN when the field raced down the backstraightway into turn 3. Steve Post and Kim Coon covered the action for MRN from pit lane.

MRN
Booth announcers	Turn announcers	Pit reporters
Lead announcer: Alex Hayden; Announcer: Jeff Striegle; Announcer: Rusty Wallace	Backstretch: Dave Moody	Steve Post; Kim Coon

== Standings after the race ==
Drivers' Championship standings

	Pos	Driver	Points
	1	Kyle Larson	5,000
	2	Chase Elliott	5,000 (–0)
3	3	Martin Truex Jr.	5,000 (–0)
1	4	Denny Hamlin	5,000 (–0)
2	5	Brad Keselowski	2,323 (–2,677)
3	6	Kevin Harvick	2,318 (–2,682)
2	7	Ryan Blaney	2,308 (–2,692)
	8	Joey Logano	2,308 (–2,692)
5	9	Kyle Busch	2,285 (–2,715)
1	10	William Byron	2,280 (–2,720)
1	11	Kurt Busch	2,274 (–2,726)
	12	Christopher Bell	2,251 (–2,749)
	13	Tyler Reddick	2,232 (–2,768)
	14	Alex Bowman	2,221 (–2,779)
	15	Aric Almirola	2,184 (–2,816)
	16	Michael McDowell	2,139 (–2,861)
Official driver's standings

Manufacturers' Championship standings

Pos	Manufacturer	Points
1	Chevrolet	1,296
2	Toyota	1,204 (–92)
3	Ford	1,203 (–93)

- Note: Only the first 16 positions are included for the driver standings.

Previous race: 2021 Hollywood Casino 400	NASCAR Cup Series; 2021 season	Next race: 2021 NASCAR Cup Series Championship Race
