= 2021 Autotrader EchoPark Automotive 500 =

NASCAR Cup Series race

Race details
- Race 33 of 36 in the 2021 NASCAR Cup Series
- Date: October 17, 2021
- Location: Texas Motor Speedway in Fort Worth, Texas
- Course: Permanent racing facility
- Course length: 1.5 miles (2.4 km)
- Distance: 334 laps, 501 mi (801.6 km)
- Average speed: 134.859 miles per hour (217.035 km/h)

Pole position
Driver	Kyle Larson	Hendrick Motorsports
- Grid positions set by competition-based formula

Most laps led
Driver	Kyle Larson	Hendrick Motorsports
- Laps: 257

Winner
No. 5	Kyle Larson	Hendrick Motorsports

Television in the United States
- Network: NBC
- Announcers: Rick Allen, Jeff Burton, Steve Letarte and Dale Earnhardt Jr.

Radio in the United States
- Radio: PRN
- Booth announcers: Doug Rice and Mark Garrow
- Turn announcers: Rob Albright (1 & 2) and Pat Patterson (3 & 4)

The 2021 Autotrader EchoPark Automotive 500 was a NASCAR Cup Series race held on October 17, 2021, at Texas Motor Speedway in Fort Worth, Texas. Contested over 334 laps on the 1.5 mile (2.4 km) intermediate quad-oval, it was the 33rd race of the 2021 NASCAR Cup Series season, the seventh race of the Playoffs, and first race of the Round of 8.

== Report ==
=== Background ===
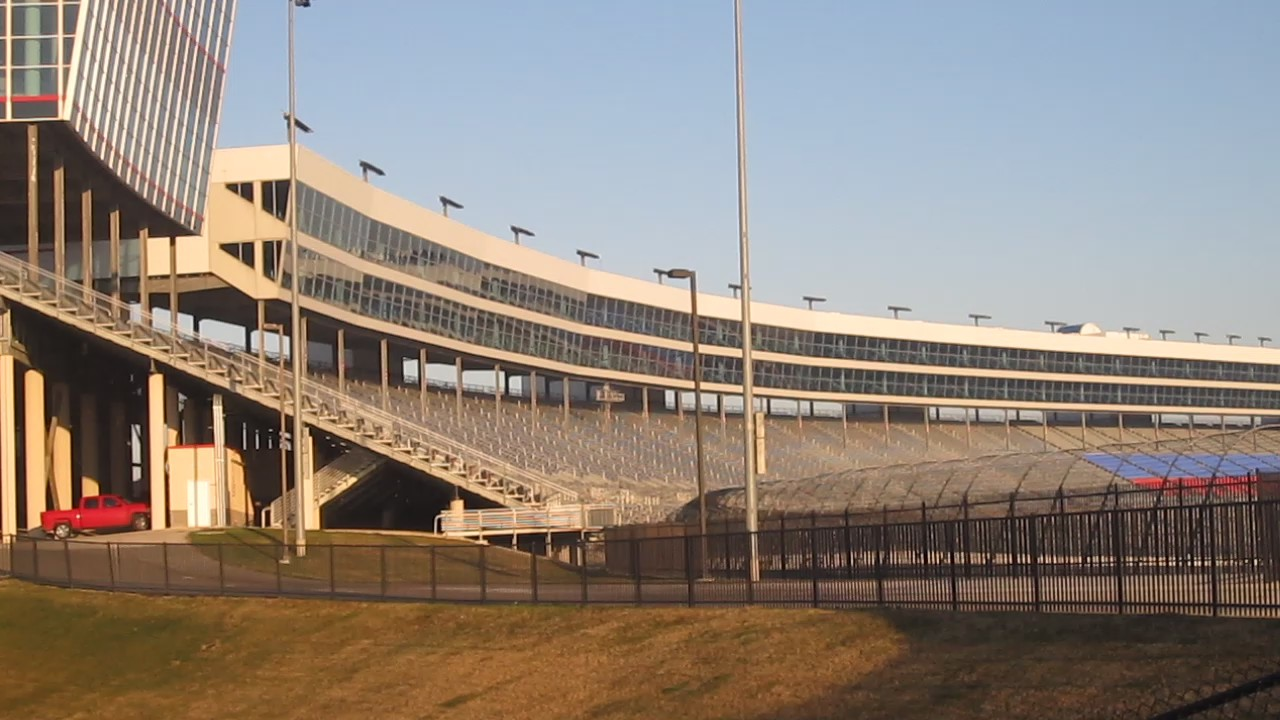
Texas Motor Speedway, the track where the race was held.

Texas Motor Speedway is a speedway located in the northernmost portion of the U.S. city of Fort Worth, Texas – the portion located in Denton County, Texas. The track measures 1.5 miles (2.4 km) around and is banked 24 degrees in the turns, and is of the oval design, where the front straightaway juts outward slightly. The track layout is similar to Atlanta Motor Speedway and Charlotte Motor Speedway (formerly Lowe's Motor Speedway). The track is owned by Speedway Motorsports, Inc., the same company that owns Atlanta and Charlotte Motor Speedway, as well as the short-track Bristol Motor Speedway.

==== Entry list ====
- (R) denotes rookie driver.
- (i) denotes driver who are ineligible for series driver points.

No.	Driver	Team	Manufacturer
00	Quin Houff	StarCom Racing	Chevrolet
1	Kurt Busch	Chip Ganassi Racing	Chevrolet
2	Brad Keselowski	Team Penske	Ford
3	Austin Dillon	Richard Childress Racing	Chevrolet
4	Kevin Harvick	Stewart-Haas Racing	Ford
5	Kyle Larson	Hendrick Motorsports	Chevrolet
6	Ryan Newman	Roush Fenway Racing	Ford
7	Corey LaJoie	Spire Motorsports	Chevrolet
8	Tyler Reddick	Richard Childress Racing	Chevrolet
9	Chase Elliott	Hendrick Motorsports	Chevrolet
10	Aric Almirola	Stewart-Haas Racing	Ford
11	Denny Hamlin	Joe Gibbs Racing	Toyota
12	Ryan Blaney	Team Penske	Ford
13	Timmy Hill (i)	MBM Motorsports	Toyota
14	Chase Briscoe (R)	Stewart-Haas Racing	Ford
15	Garrett Smithley (i)	Rick Ware Racing	Chevrolet
17	Chris Buescher	Roush Fenway Racing	Ford
18	Kyle Busch	Joe Gibbs Racing	Toyota
19	Martin Truex Jr.	Joe Gibbs Racing	Toyota
20	Christopher Bell	Joe Gibbs Racing	Toyota
21	Matt DiBenedetto	Wood Brothers Racing	Ford
22	Joey Logano	Team Penske	Ford
23	Bubba Wallace	23XI Racing	Toyota
24	William Byron	Hendrick Motorsports	Chevrolet
34	Michael McDowell	Front Row Motorsports	Ford
37	Ryan Preece	JTG Daugherty Racing	Chevrolet
38	Anthony Alfredo (R)	Front Row Motorsports	Ford
41	Cole Custer	Stewart-Haas Racing	Ford
42	Ross Chastain	Chip Ganassi Racing	Chevrolet
43	Erik Jones	Richard Petty Motorsports	Chevrolet
47	Ricky Stenhouse Jr.	JTG Daugherty Racing	Chevrolet
48	Alex Bowman	Hendrick Motorsports	Chevrolet
51	Cody Ware (i)	Petty Ware Racing	Chevrolet
52	Josh Bilicki (i)	Rick Ware Racing	Ford
53	Joey Gase (i)	Rick Ware Racing	Chevrolet
66	David Starr (i)	MBM Motorsports	Ford
77	Justin Haley (i)	Spire Motorsports	Chevrolet
78	B. J. McLeod (i)	Live Fast Motorsports	Ford
99	Daniel Suárez	Trackhouse Racing Team	Chevrolet
Official entry list

== Qualifying ==
Kyle Larson was awarded the pole for the race as determined by competition-based formula.

=== Starting Lineup ===
Pos	No.	Driver	Team	Manufacturer
1	5	Kyle Larson	Hendrick Motorsports	Chevrolet
2	11	Denny Hamlin	Joe Gibbs Racing	Toyota
3	18	Kyle Busch	Joe Gibbs Racing	Toyota
4	12	Ryan Blaney	Team Penske	Ford
5	22	Joey Logano	Team Penske	Ford
6	9	Chase Elliott	Hendrick Motorsports	Chevrolet
7	2	Brad Keselowski	Team Penske	Ford
8	19	Martin Truex Jr.	Joe Gibbs Racing	Toyota
9	8	Tyler Reddick	Richard Childress Racing	Chevrolet
10	17	Chris Buescher	Roush Fenway Racing	Ford
11	20	Christopher Bell	Joe Gibbs Racing	Toyota
12	24	William Byron	Hendrick Motorsports	Chevrolet
13	21	Matt DiBenedetto	Wood Brothers Racing	Ford
14	48	Alex Bowman	Hendrick Motorsports	Chevrolet
15	3	Austin Dillon	Richard Childress Racing	Chevrolet
16	34	Michael McDowell	Front Row Motorsports	Ford
17	1	Kurt Busch	Chip Ganassi Racing	Chevrolet
18	23	Bubba Wallace	23XI Racing	Toyota
19	99	Daniel Suárez	Trackhouse Racing Team	Chevrolet
20	41	Cole Custer	Stewart-Haas Racing	Ford
21	43	Erik Jones	Richard Petty Motorsports	Chevrolet
22	10	Aric Almirola	Stewart-Haas Racing	Ford
23	37	Ryan Preece	JTG Daugherty Racing	Chevrolet
24	4	Kevin Harvick	Stewart-Haas Racing	Ford
25	42	Ross Chastain	Chip Ganassi Racing	Chevrolet
26	14	Chase Briscoe (R)	Stewart-Haas Racing	Ford
27	47	Ricky Stenhouse Jr.	JTG Daugherty Racing	Chevrolet
28	38	Anthony Alfredo (R)	Front Row Motorsports	Ford
29	7	Corey LaJoie	Spire Motorsports	Chevrolet
30	00	Quin Houff	StarCom Racing	Chevrolet
31	6	Ryan Newman	Roush Fenway Racing	Ford
32	77	Justin Haley (i)	Spire Motorsports	Chevrolet
33	52	Josh Bilicki (i)	Rick Ware Racing	Ford
34	51	Cody Ware (i)	Petty Ware Racing	Chevrolet
35	78	B. J. McLeod (i)	Live Fast Motorsports	Ford
36	15	Garrett Smithley (i)	Rick Ware Racing	Chevrolet
37	53	Joey Gase (i)	Rick Ware Racing	Chevrolet
38	66	David Starr (i)	MBM Motorsports	Ford
39	13	Timmy Hill (i)	MBM Motorsports	Toyota
Official starting lineup

== Race ==
=== Stage Results ===
Stage One Laps: 105

Pos	No	Driver	Team	Manufacturer	Points
1	18	Kyle Busch	Joe Gibbs Racing	Toyota	10
2	12	Ryan Blaney	Team Penske	Ford	9
3	5	Kyle Larson	Hendrick Motorsports	Chevrolet	8
4	1	Kurt Busch	Chip Ganassi Racing	Chevrolet	7
5	24	William Byron	Hendrick Motorsports	Chevrolet	6
6	14	Chase Briscoe (R)	Stewart-Haas Racing	Ford	5
7	11	Denny Hamlin	Joe Gibbs Racing	Toyota	4
8	9	Chase Elliott	Hendrick Motorsports	Chevrolet	3
9	8	Tyler Reddick	Richard Childress Racing	Chevrolet	2
10	2	Brad Keselowski	Team Penske	Ford	1
Official stage one results

Stage Two Laps: 105

Pos	No	Driver	Team	Manufacturer	Points
1	5	Kyle Larson	Hendrick Motorsports	Chevrolet	10
2	24	William Byron	Hendrick Motorsports	Chevrolet	9
3	12	Ryan Blaney	Team Penske	Ford	8
4	4	Kevin Harvick	Stewart-Haas Racing	Ford	7
5	2	Brad Keselowski	Team Penske	Ford	6
6	1	Kurt Busch	Chip Ganassi Racing	Chevrolet	5
7	11	Denny Hamlin	Joe Gibbs Racing	Toyota	4
8	14	Chase Briscoe (R)	Stewart-Haas Racing	Ford	3
9	8	Tyler Reddick	Richard Childress Racing	Chevrolet	2
10	18	Kyle Busch	Joe Gibbs Racing	Toyota	1
Official stage two results

=== Final Stage Results ===
Stage Three Laps: 124

Pos	Grid	No	Driver	Team	Manufacturer	Laps	Points
1	1	5	Kyle Larson	Hendrick Motorsports	Chevrolet	334	52
2	12	24	William Byron	Hendrick Motorsports	Chevrolet	334	50
3	11	20	Christopher Bell	Joe Gibbs Racing	Toyota	334	34
4	7	2	Brad Keselowski	Team Penske	Ford	334	40
5	24	4	Kevin Harvick	Stewart-Haas Racing	Ford	334	39
6	4	12	Ryan Blaney	Team Penske	Ford	334	48
7	6	9	Chase Elliott	Hendrick Motorsports	Chevrolet	334	33
8	3	18	Kyle Busch	Joe Gibbs Racing	Toyota	334	40
9	9	8	Tyler Reddick	Richard Childress Racing	Chevrolet	334	32
10	19	99	Daniel Suárez	Trackhouse Racing Team	Chevrolet	334	27
11	2	11	Denny Hamlin	Joe Gibbs Racing	Toyota	334	34
12	21	43	Erik Jones	Richard Petty Motorsports	Chevrolet	334	25
13	13	21	Matt DiBenedetto	Wood Brothers Racing	Ford	334	24
14	15	3	Austin Dillon	Richard Childress Racing	Chevrolet	334	23
15	26	14	Chase Briscoe (R)	Stewart-Haas Racing	Ford	334	30
16	17	1	Kurt Busch	Chip Ganassi Racing	Chevrolet	332	33
17	16	34	Michael McDowell	Front Row Motorsports	Ford	332	20
18	22	10	Aric Almirola	Stewart-Haas Racing	Ford	331	19
19	20	41	Cole Custer	Stewart-Haas Racing	Ford	330	18
20	29	7	Corey LaJoie	Spire Motorsports	Chevrolet	329	17
21	10	17	Chris Buescher	Roush Fenway Racing	Ford	327	16
22	35	78	B. J. McLeod (i)	Live Fast Motorsports	Ford	324	0
23	38	66	David Starr (i)	MBM Motorsports	Ford	323	0
24	36	15	Garrett Smithley (i)	Rick Ware Racing	Chevrolet	321	0
25	8	19	Martin Truex Jr.	Joe Gibbs Racing	Toyota	320	12
26	33	52	Josh Bilicki (i)	Rick Ware Racing	Ford	319	0
27	39	13	Timmy Hill (i)	MBM Motorsports	Toyota	317	0
28	25	42	Ross Chastain	Chip Ganassi Racing	Chevrolet	311	9
29	28	38	Anthony Alfredo (R)	Front Row Motorsports	Ford	299	8
30	5	22	Joey Logano	Team Penske	Ford	298	25
31	30	00	Quin Houff	StarCom Racing	Chevrolet	59	6
32	18	23	Bubba Wallace	23XI Racing	Toyota	38	5
33	14	48	Alex Bowman	Hendrick Motorsports	Chevrolet	36	4
34	27	47	Ricky Stenhouse Jr.	JTG Daugherty Racing	Chevrolet	31	3
35	31	6	Ryan Newman	Roush Fenway Racing	Ford	31	2
36	23	37	Ryan Preece	JTG Daugherty Racing	Chevrolet	30	1
37	32	77	Justin Haley (i)	Spire Motorsports	Chevrolet	30	0
38	34	51	Cody Ware (i)	Petty Ware Racing	Chevrolet	30	0
39	37	53	Joey Gase (i)	Rick Ware Racing	Chevrolet	29	0
Official race results

=== Race statistics ===
- Lead changes: 8 among 5 different drivers
- Cautions/Laps: 11 for 55
- Red flags: 1 for 11 minutes and 9 seconds
- Time of race: 3 hours, 42 minutes and 54 seconds
- Average speed: 134.859 miles per hour (217.035 km/h)

== Media ==
=== Television ===
NBC Sports covered the race on the television side. Rick Allen, Two–time Texas winner Jeff Burton, Steve Letarte and 2000 Texas winner Dale Earnhardt Jr. called the race from the broadcast booth. Parker Kligerman, Marty Snider and Kelli Stavast handled the pit road duties from pit lane.

NBC
Booth announcers	Pit reporters
Lap-by-lap: Rick Allen; Color-commentator: Jeff Burton; Color-commentator: Steve Letarte; Color-commentator: Dale Earnhardt Jr.	Parker Kligerman; Marty Snider; Kelli Stavast

=== Radio ===
PRN covered their final 2021 broadcast, which was also simulcast on Sirius XM NASCAR Radio. Doug Rice & Mark Garrow covered the action for PRN when the field raced down the front straightaway. Nick Yeoman covered the action for PRN from a platform outside of Turns 1 & 2, & Pat Patterson covered the action from a platform outside of Turns 3 & 4 for PRN. Brad Gillie, Brett McMillan and Heather DeBeaux had the call from pit lane for PRN.

PRN
Booth announcers	Turn announcers	Pit reporters
Lead announcer: Doug Rice; Announcer: Mark Garrow	Turns 1 & 2: Nick Yeoman; Turns 3 & 4: Pat Patterson	Brad Gillie; Brett McMillan; Heather DeBeaux

== Standings after the race ==
Drivers' Championship standings

	Pos	Driver	Points
	1	Kyle Larson	4,123
2	2	Ryan Blaney	4,072 (–51)
1	3	Denny Hamlin	4,064 (–59)
1	4	Kyle Busch	4,063 (–60)
1	5	Chase Elliott	4,055 (–68)
2	6	Brad Keselowski	4,048 (–75)
4	7	Martin Truex Jr.	4,041 (–82)
1	8	Joey Logano	4,020 (–103)
	9	Kevin Harvick	2,248 (–1,875)
	10	Christopher Bell	2,198 (–1,925)
	11	Kurt Busch	2,196 (–1,927)
	12	Tyler Reddick	2,192 (–1,931)
	13	William Byron	2,183 (–1,940)
1	14	Aric Almirola	2,136 (–1,987)
1	15	Alex Bowman	2,135 (–1,988)
	16	Michael McDowell	2,107 (–2,016)
Official driver's standings

Manufacturers' Championship standings

Pos	Manufacturer	Points
1	Chevrolet	1,216
2	Toyota	1,137 (–79)
3	Ford	1,135 (–81)

- Note: Only the first 16 positions are included for the driver standings.

Previous race: 2021 Bank of America Roval 400	NASCAR Cup Series; 2021 season	Next race: 2021 Hollywood Casino 400
