= George Gorham =

George Gorham may refer to:

- George Congdon Gorham (1832–1909), American politician
- George Cornelius Gorham (1787–1857), controversial English ecclesiastic
- George Gorham Jr. (born 1987), American racing driver
