= Focused Health 250 =

Focused Health 250 may refer to several NASCAR Xfinity Series races:

- Focused Health 250 (COTA), a race at Circuit of the Americas, first held in 2021 and renamed in 2024
- Focused Health 250 (Atlanta), a race at Atlanta Motor Speedway, first held in 2021 and renamed in 2024
