= 2021 NASCAR Xfinity Series =

American motorsport season

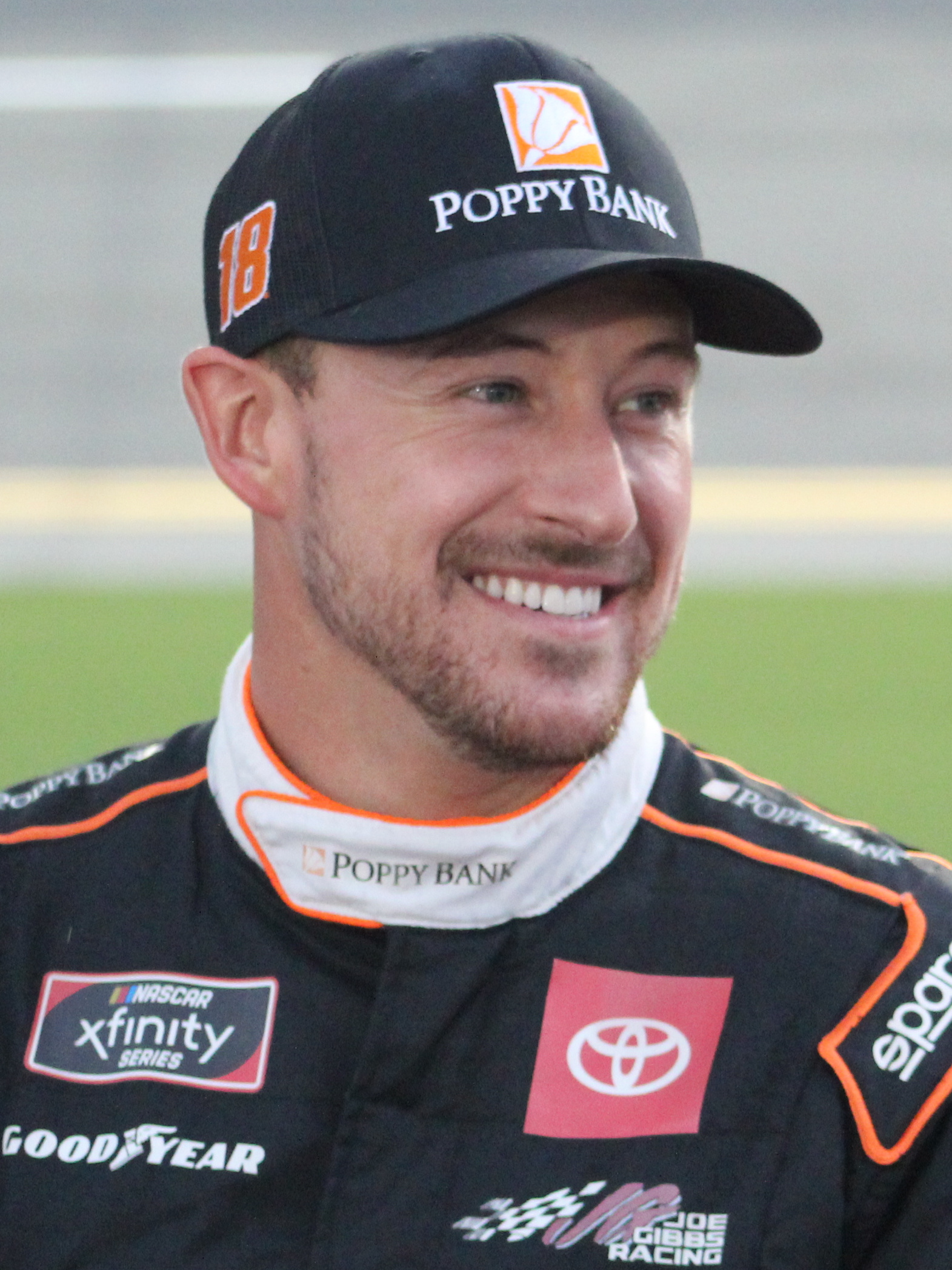
Daniel Hemric, the 2021 Xfinity Series champion.

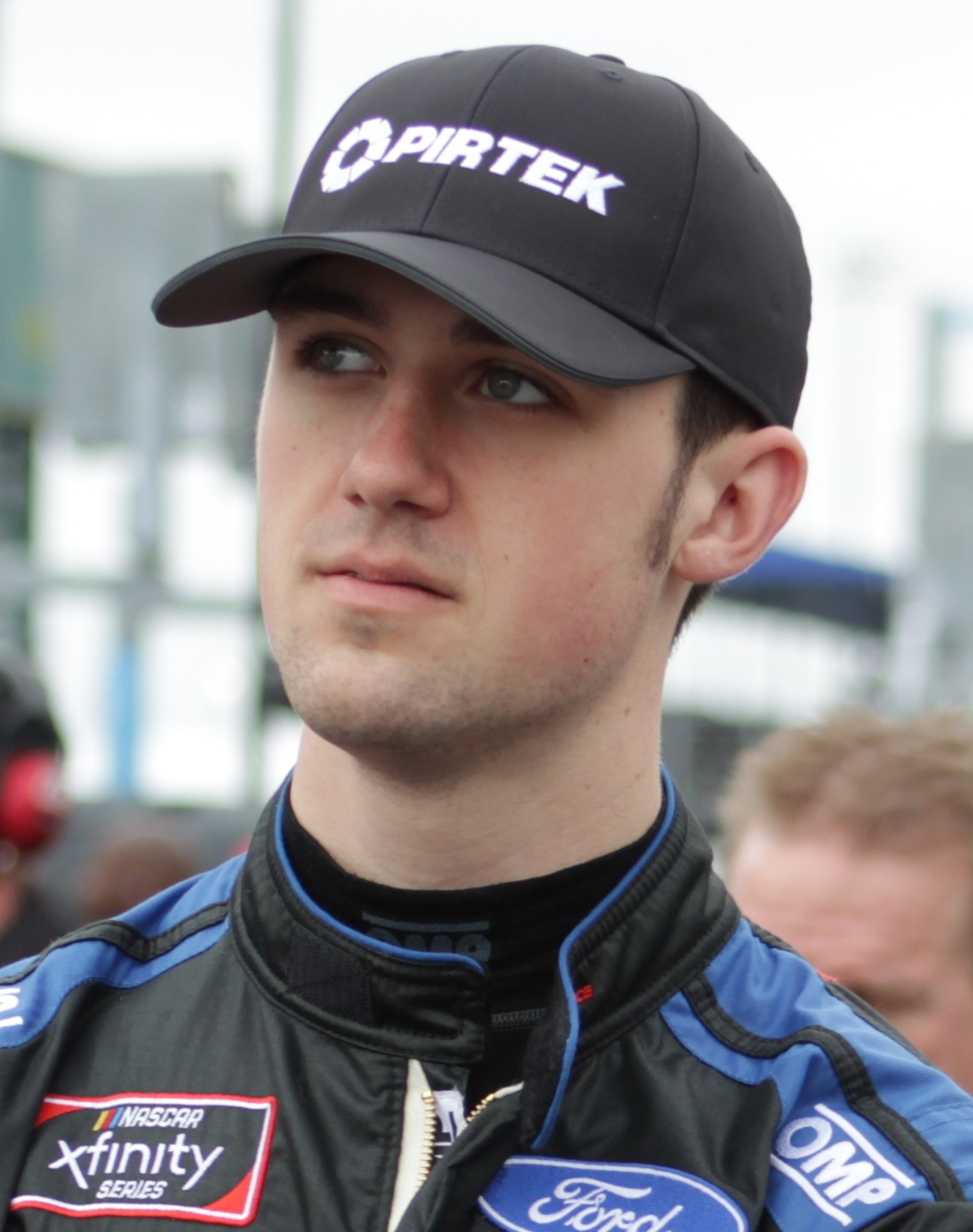
Austin Cindric finished second behind Hemric in the championship.

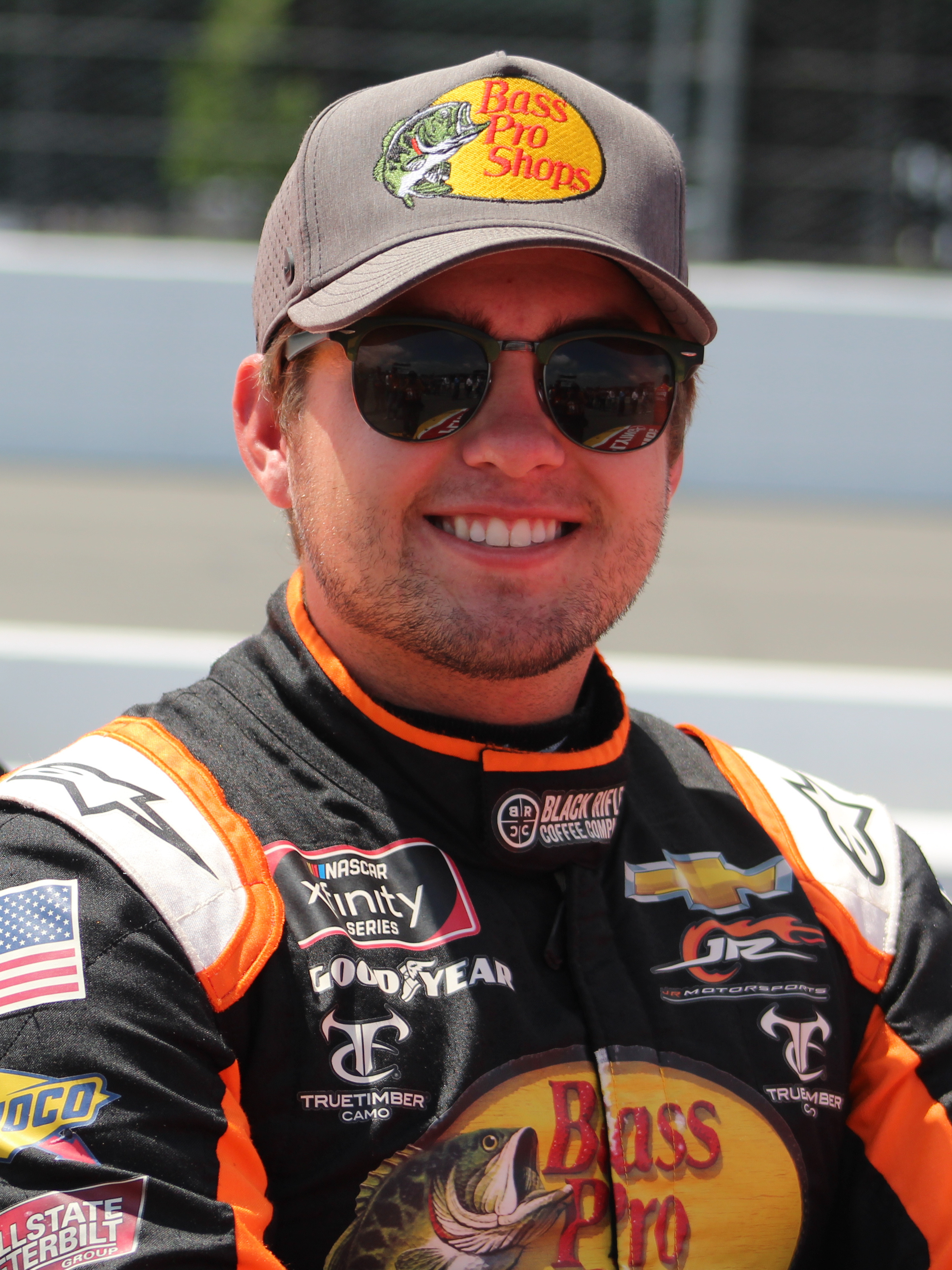
Noah Gragson finished third in the championship.

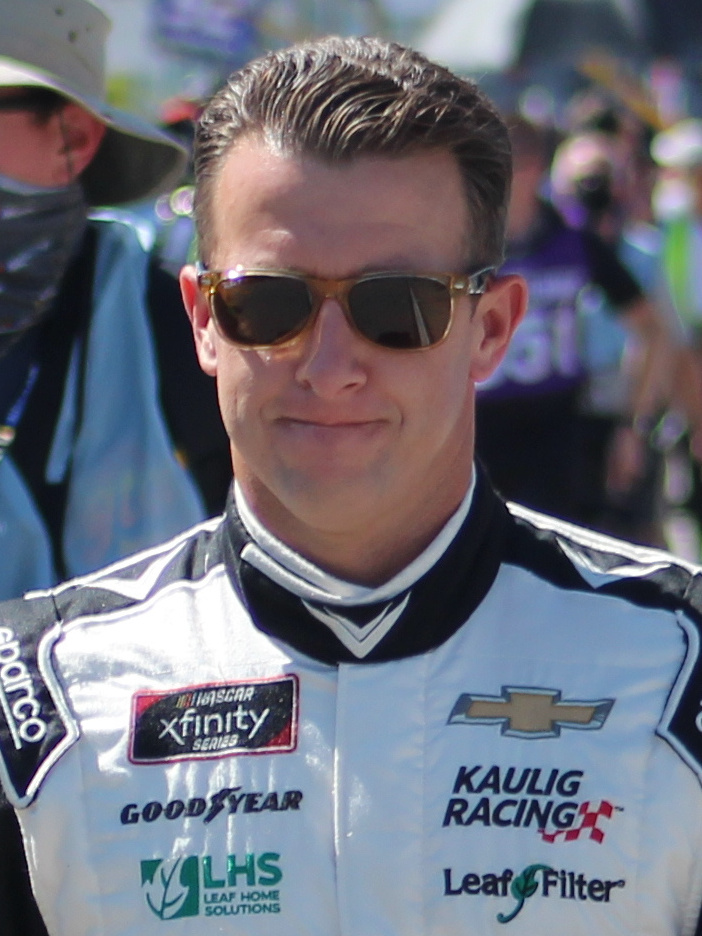
A. J. Allmendinger won the Regular Season Championship, but finished fourth in the championship.

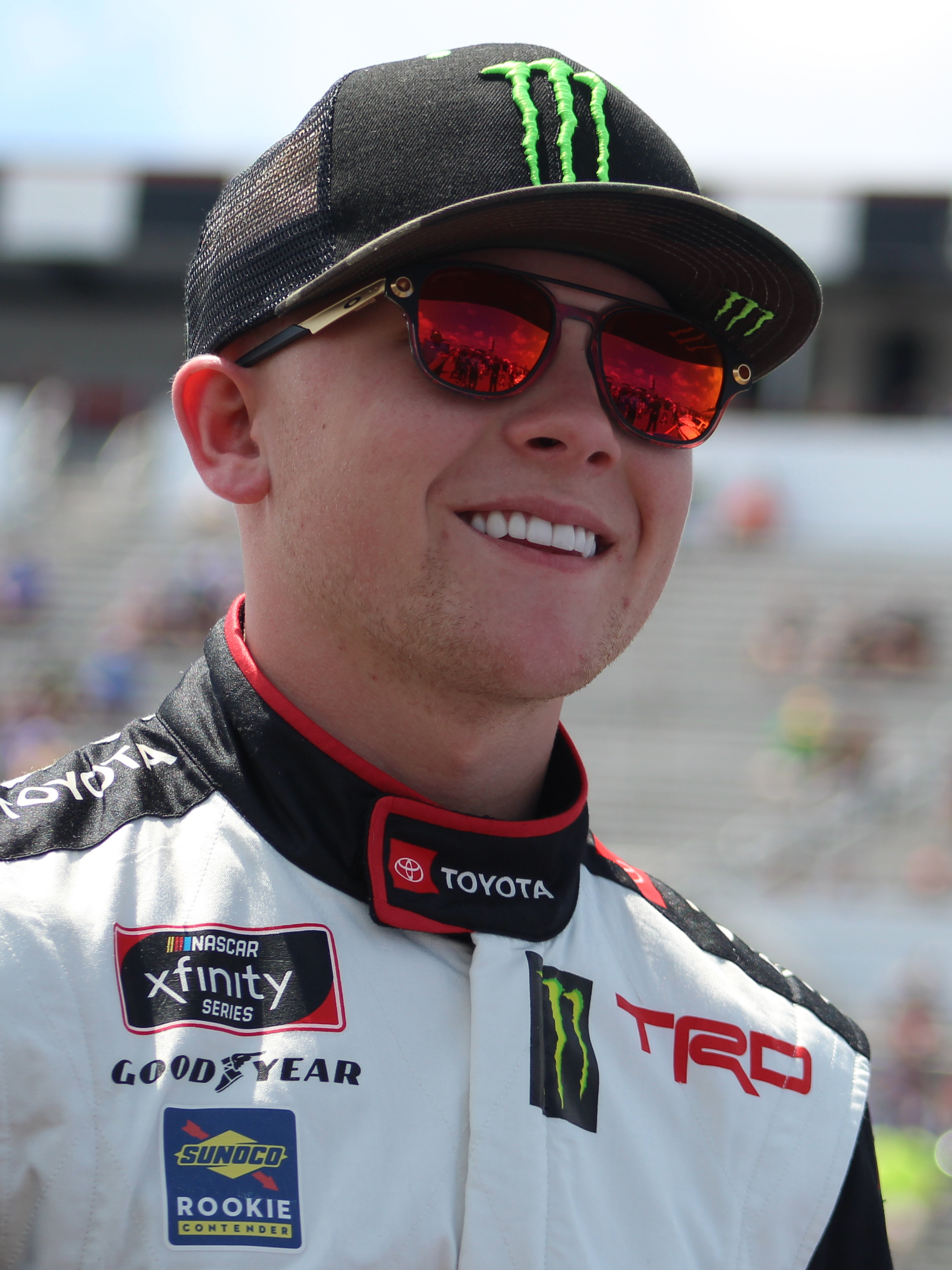
Ty Gibbs won the Rookie of the Year award.

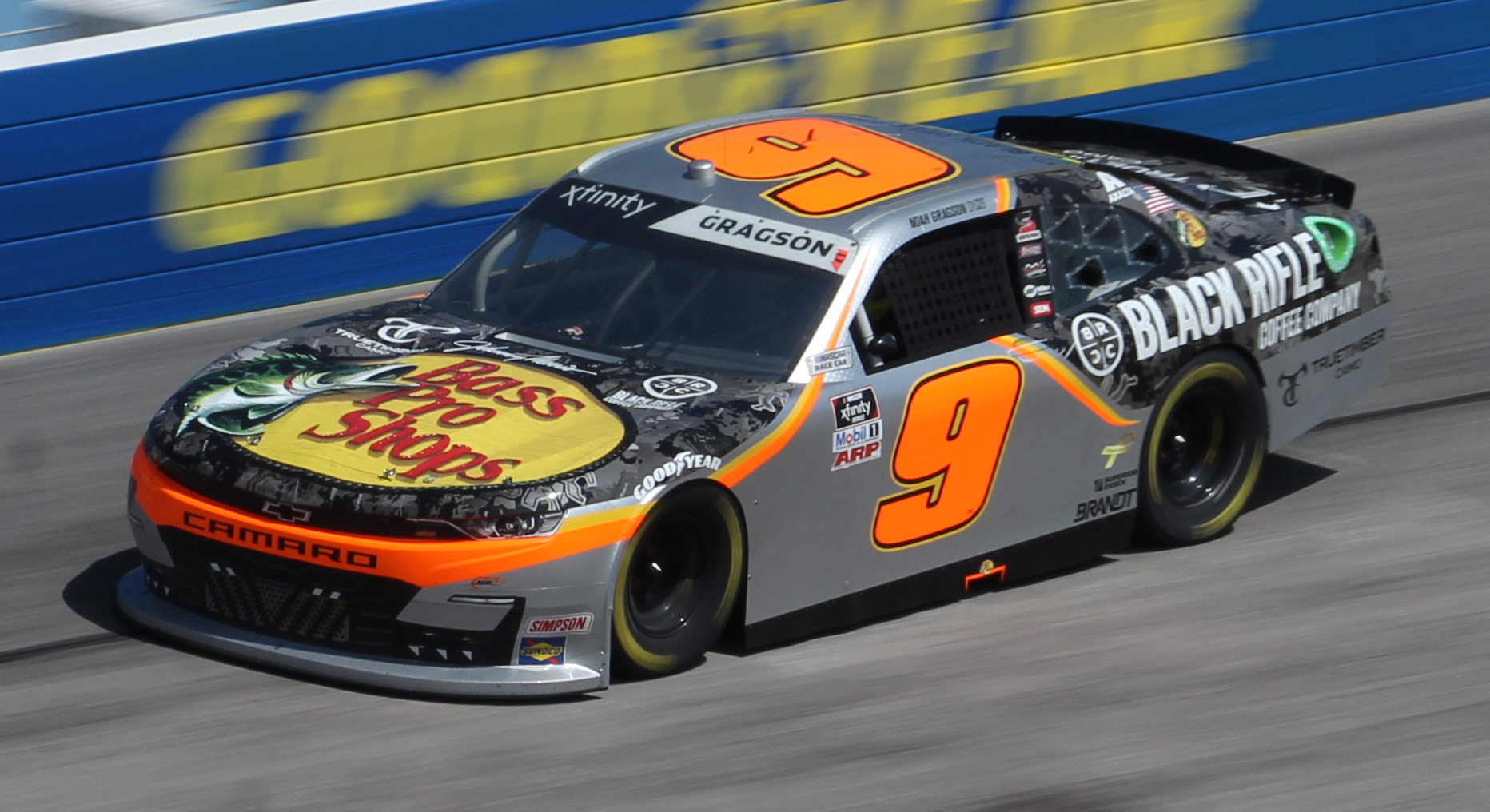
Chevrolet won the manufacturer's championship.

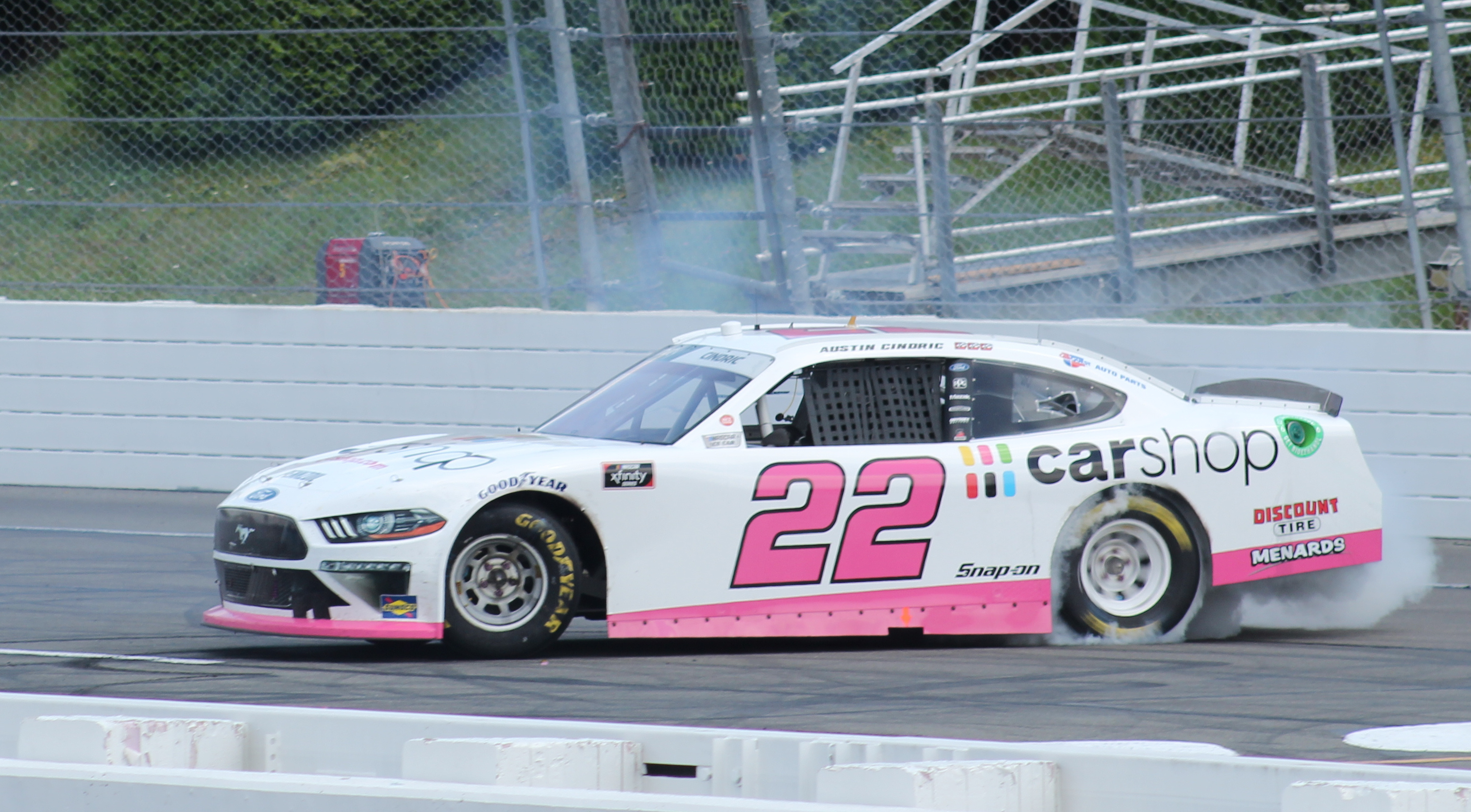
The no. 22 car for Team Penske, driven exclusively by Austin Cindric, won the owners championship.

The 2021 NASCAR Xfinity Series was the 40th season of the NASCAR Xfinity Series, a stock car racing series sanctioned by NASCAR in the United States. The season began at Daytona International Speedway with the Beef. It's What's for Dinner. 300 on February 13. The regular season ended with the Food City 300 at Bristol Motor Speedway on September 17. The NASCAR playoffs ended with the NASCAR Xfinity Series Championship Race at Phoenix Raceway on November 6.

Following the Food City 300 at Bristol Motor Speedway, A. J. Allmendinger of Kaulig Racing clinched the Regular Season Championship. Chevrolet took the Manufacturer Championship following the Dead On Tools 250 at Martinsville Speedway. At the season finale, Daniel Hemric of Joe Gibbs Racing scored his first career win and claimed the Xfinity Series championship. It was also the first Xfinity Series championship for the Toyota Supra. This was also the season where Kyle Busch would score his final NASCAR Xfinity Series win as he would unexpectedly pass away on May 21, 2026.

== Teams and drivers ==
=== Complete schedule ===
Manufacturer	Team	No.	Race driver	Crew chief
Chevrolet	Big Machine Racing	48	Danny Bohn 1	Patrick Donahue
Chevrolet	Big Machine Racing	48	Jade Buford (R) 32	Patrick Donahue
Chevrolet	Brandonbilt Motorsports	68	Brandon Brown	Doug Randolph
Chevrolet	DGM Racing	36	Alex Labbé	B. J. Tucker 2 Mario Gosselin 31
Chevrolet	DGM Racing	92	Josh Williams	Ryan London 4 Eddie Troconis 17; Steven Hazelbaker 1 Nathan Kennedy 12
Chevrolet	JD Motorsports	0	Jeffrey Earnhardt 32	Kase Kallenbach 16; Paul Clapprood 17
Chevrolet	JD Motorsports	0	Spencer Pumpelly 1	Kase Kallenbach 16; Paul Clapprood 17
Chevrolet	JD Motorsports	4	Landon Cassill 29 (Note: Cassill ran the full season for JD Motorsports split between the Nos. 4 and 6.)	Tommy MacHek 30; Ricky Viers 3
Chevrolet	JD Motorsports	4	Ryan Vargas (R) 4	Tommy MacHek 30; Ricky Viers 3
Chevrolet	JD Motorsports	6	Ryan Vargas (R) 25	Ricky Viers 13; Tommy MacHek 3 Kase Kallenbach 17
Chevrolet	JD Motorsports	6	Landon Cassill 4	Ricky Viers 13; Tommy MacHek 3 Kase Kallenbach 17
Chevrolet	JD Motorsports	6	Spencer Pumpelly 2	Ricky Viers 13; Tommy MacHek 3 Kase Kallenbach 17
Chevrolet	JD Motorsports	6	Michael Munley 1	Ricky Viers 13; Tommy MacHek 3 Kase Kallenbach 17
Chevrolet	JD Motorsports	6	Ryan Eversley 1	Ricky Viers 13; Tommy MacHek 3 Kase Kallenbach 17
Chevrolet	Jeremy Clements Racing	51	Jeremy Clements	Mark Setzer
Chevrolet	Jordan Anderson Racing	31	Jordan Anderson 16	Arthur Haire
Chevrolet	Jordan Anderson Racing	31	Tyler Reddick 3	Arthur Haire
Chevrolet	Jordan Anderson Racing	31	Josh Berry (R) 5	Arthur Haire
Chevrolet	Jordan Anderson Racing	31	Kaz Grala 2	Arthur Haire
Chevrolet	Jordan Anderson Racing	31	Erik Jones 1	Arthur Haire
Chevrolet	Jordan Anderson Racing	31	Sage Karam 4	Arthur Haire
Chevrolet	Jordan Anderson Racing	31	Austin Dillon 1	Arthur Haire
Chevrolet	Jordan Anderson Racing	31	Ty Dillon 1	Arthur Haire
Chevrolet	JR Motorsports	1	Michael Annett 26	Mike Bumgarner
Chevrolet	JR Motorsports	1	Austin Dillon 1	Mike Bumgarner
Chevrolet	JR Motorsports	1	Josh Berry (R) 5	Mike Bumgarner
Chevrolet	JR Motorsports	1	Chase Elliott 1	Mike Bumgarner
Chevrolet	JR Motorsports	7	Justin Allgaier	Jason Burdett 32; Allen Hart 1
Chevrolet	JR Motorsports	8	Josh Berry (R) 12	Taylor Moyer
Chevrolet	JR Motorsports	8	Miguel Paludo 3	Taylor Moyer
Chevrolet	JR Motorsports	8	Sam Mayer (R) 17	Taylor Moyer
Chevrolet	JR Motorsports	8	Dale Earnhardt Jr. 1	Taylor Moyer
Chevrolet	JR Motorsports	9	Noah Gragson	Dave Elenz
Chevrolet	Kaulig Racing	10	Jeb Burton	Bruce Schlicker
Chevrolet	Kaulig Racing	11	Justin Haley 32	Alex Yontz
Chevrolet	Kaulig Racing	11	Zane Smith 1	Alex Yontz
Chevrolet	Kaulig Racing	16	A. J. Allmendinger	Jason Trinchere 32; Justin Cox 1
Chevrolet	Martins Motorsports	44	Tommy Joe Martins	Buddy Sisco 5 Frank Kerr 2 Dan Stillman 25; Craig Martins 1
Chevrolet	Mike Harmon Racing	47	Kyle Weatherman	Alan Collins Jr. 2 Teddy Brown 15; Mike Harmon 3 Mike Tyska 13
Chevrolet	Mike Harmon Racing	74	Bayley Currey 21	Ed Jewett 24; Alan Collins Jr. 1 Mike Harmon 1 Ryan Bell 7
Chevrolet	Mike Harmon Racing	74	Jesse Iwuji 1	Ed Jewett 24; Alan Collins Jr. 1 Mike Harmon 1 Ryan Bell 7
Chevrolet	Mike Harmon Racing	74	Dawson Cram 1	Ed Jewett 24; Alan Collins Jr. 1 Mike Harmon 1 Ryan Bell 7
Chevrolet	Mike Harmon Racing	74	Tim Viens 1	Ed Jewett 24; Alan Collins Jr. 1 Mike Harmon 1 Ryan Bell 7
Chevrolet	Mike Harmon Racing	74	Carson Ware 1 (Note: Entries were fielded in a collaboration with Rick Ware Racing.)	Ed Jewett 24; Alan Collins Jr. 1 Mike Harmon 1 Ryan Bell 7
Chevrolet	Mike Harmon Racing	74	C. J. McLaughlin 4	Ed Jewett 24; Alan Collins Jr. 1 Mike Harmon 1 Ryan Bell 7
Chevrolet	Mike Harmon Racing	74	Gray Gaulding 2	Ed Jewett 24; Alan Collins Jr. 1 Mike Harmon 1 Ryan Bell 7
Chevrolet	Mike Harmon Racing	74	Mike Harmon 1	Ed Jewett 24; Alan Collins Jr. 1 Mike Harmon 1 Ryan Bell 7
Chevrolet	Mike Harmon Racing	74	Ryan Ellis 1	Ed Jewett 24; Alan Collins Jr. 1 Mike Harmon 1 Ryan Bell 7
Chevrolet	Our Motorsports	02	Brett Moffitt 31	Joe Williams Jr. 16; Kevin Manion 1 Tucker Scanlon 2 Pat Tryson 14
Chevrolet	Our Motorsports	02	Ty Dillon 2	Joe Williams Jr. 16; Kevin Manion 1 Tucker Scanlon 2 Pat Tryson 14
Chevrolet	Richard Childress Racing	2	Myatt Snider	Andy Street
Chevrolet	SS-Green Light Racing	07	Joe Graf Jr. 27	Mike Tyska 18; Jason Miller 4 Joe Williams Jr. 10; Joe White 1
Chevrolet	SS-Green Light Racing	07	Ross Chastain 1	Mike Tyska 18; Jason Miller 4 Joe Williams Jr. 10; Joe White 1
Chevrolet	SS-Green Light Racing	07	J. J. Yeley 2	Mike Tyska 18; Jason Miller 4 Joe Williams Jr. 10; Joe White 1
Chevrolet	SS-Green Light Racing	07	Josh Bilicki 3	Mike Tyska 18; Jason Miller 4 Joe Williams Jr. 10; Joe White 1
Ford	RSS Racing	39	Ryan Sieg 32 (Note: Ryan Sieg ran the full season for RSS Racing split between the Nos. 38 and 39.)	Kevin Starland 19; Shane Wilson 13
Ford	RSS Racing	39	Kyle Sieg 1	Pat Cole
Ford	Stewart–Haas Racing	98	Riley Herbst	Richard Boswell
Ford	Team Penske	22	Austin Cindric	Brian Wilson
Toyota	Hattori Racing Enterprises (Note: Shigeaki Hattori was the listed owner of the No. 61 in each race, although the team only fielded the car if Austin Hill or Bubba Wallace was the driver. MBM Motorsports fielded it in all other races using Hattori's owner points and car number.)	61	Robby Lyons 1	Patrick Magee 4 Clinton Cram 3 Sebastian LaForge 3 Doug Richert 9 David McCarty 6 Johnny Roten 5 Michael Contarino 3
Toyota	Hattori Racing Enterprises	61	Stephen Leicht 5	Patrick Magee 4 Clinton Cram 3 Sebastian LaForge 3 Doug Richert 9 David McCarty 6 Johnny Roten 5 Michael Contarino 3
Toyota	Hattori Racing Enterprises	61	Chad Finchum 3	Patrick Magee 4 Clinton Cram 3 Sebastian LaForge 3 Doug Richert 9 David McCarty 6 Johnny Roten 5 Michael Contarino 3
Toyota	Hattori Racing Enterprises	61	David Starr 13	Patrick Magee 4 Clinton Cram 3 Sebastian LaForge 3 Doug Richert 9 David McCarty 6 Johnny Roten 5 Michael Contarino 3
Toyota	Hattori Racing Enterprises	61	Matt Jaskol 1	Patrick Magee 4 Clinton Cram 3 Sebastian LaForge 3 Doug Richert 9 David McCarty 6 Johnny Roten 5 Michael Contarino 3
Toyota	Hattori Racing Enterprises	61	Austin Hill 5	Patrick Magee 4 Clinton Cram 3 Sebastian LaForge 3 Doug Richert 9 David McCarty 6 Johnny Roten 5 Michael Contarino 3
Toyota	Hattori Racing Enterprises	61	Boris Said 1	Patrick Magee 4 Clinton Cram 3 Sebastian LaForge 3 Doug Richert 9 David McCarty 6 Johnny Roten 5 Michael Contarino 3
Toyota	Hattori Racing Enterprises	61	C. J. McLaughlin 1	Patrick Magee 4 Clinton Cram 3 Sebastian LaForge 3 Doug Richert 9 David McCarty 6 Johnny Roten 5 Michael Contarino 3
Toyota	Hattori Racing Enterprises	61	Bubba Wallace 1	Patrick Magee 4 Clinton Cram 3 Sebastian LaForge 3 Doug Richert 9 David McCarty 6 Johnny Roten 5 Michael Contarino 3
Toyota	Hattori Racing Enterprises	61	Loris Hezemans 1 (Note: Entries were fielded in a collaboration with Reaume Brothers Racing.)	Patrick Magee 4 Clinton Cram 3 Sebastian LaForge 3 Doug Richert 9 David McCarty 6 Johnny Roten 5 Michael Contarino 3
Toyota	Hattori Racing Enterprises	61	Timmy Hill 1	Patrick Magee 4 Clinton Cram 3 Sebastian LaForge 3 Doug Richert 9 David McCarty 6 Johnny Roten 5 Michael Contarino 3
Toyota	Joe Gibbs Racing	18	Daniel Hemric	Dave Rogers
Toyota	Joe Gibbs Racing	19	Brandon Jones	Jeff Meendering
Toyota	Joe Gibbs Racing	20	Harrison Burton	Jason Ratcliff 32; Dustin Zacharyasz 1
Toyota	Joe Gibbs Racing	54	Ty Dillon 4	Chris Gayle 32; Mark McFarland 1
Toyota	Joe Gibbs Racing	54	Ty Gibbs (R) 17	Chris Gayle 32; Mark McFarland 1
Toyota	Joe Gibbs Racing	54	Martin Truex Jr. 1	Chris Gayle 32; Mark McFarland 1
Toyota	Joe Gibbs Racing	54	Kyle Busch 5	Chris Gayle 32; Mark McFarland 1
Toyota	Joe Gibbs Racing	54	Christopher Bell 2	Chris Gayle 32; Mark McFarland 1
Toyota	Joe Gibbs Racing	54	Denny Hamlin 1	Chris Gayle 32; Mark McFarland 1
Toyota	Joe Gibbs Racing	54	John Hunter Nemechek 3	Chris Gayle 32; Mark McFarland 1
Toyota	Sam Hunt Racing	26	Brandon Gdovic 6	Andrew Abbott
Toyota	Sam Hunt Racing	26	Kris Wright 6	Andrew Abbott
Toyota	Sam Hunt Racing	26	Santino Ferrucci 7	Andrew Abbott
Toyota	Sam Hunt Racing	26	Colin Garrett 5	Andrew Abbott
Toyota	Sam Hunt Racing	26	John Hunter Nemechek 2	Andrew Abbott
Toyota	Sam Hunt Racing	26	Grant Enfinger 1	Andrew Abbott
Toyota	Sam Hunt Racing	26	Will Rodgers 2	Andrew Abbott
Toyota	Sam Hunt Racing	26	Dylan Lupton 4	Andrew Abbott
Chevrolet 17 Toyota 15 Ford 1	B. J. McLeod Motorsports	5	Matt Mills 27	George Ingram 26; Lee Leslie 1 Adam Brooks 3 Keith Wolfe 3
Chevrolet 17 Toyota 15 Ford 1	B. J. McLeod Motorsports	5	Kevin Harvick 1 (Note: Entries were fielded in a collaboration with Stewart–Haas Racing.)	George Ingram 26; Lee Leslie 1 Adam Brooks 3 Keith Wolfe 3
Chevrolet 17 Toyota 15 Ford 1	B. J. McLeod Motorsports	5	Andy Lally 1	George Ingram 26; Lee Leslie 1 Adam Brooks 3 Keith Wolfe 3
Chevrolet 17 Toyota 15 Ford 1	B. J. McLeod Motorsports	5	James Davison 1 (Note: Kyle Tilley was initially entered in the car and drove it in practice, but was replaced by Davison for qualifying and the race due to a shoulder injury.)	George Ingram 26; Lee Leslie 1 Adam Brooks 3 Keith Wolfe 3
Chevrolet 17 Toyota 15 Ford 1	B. J. McLeod Motorsports	5	Stefan Parsons 1	George Ingram 26; Lee Leslie 1 Adam Brooks 3 Keith Wolfe 3
Chevrolet 17 Toyota 15 Ford 1	B. J. McLeod Motorsports	5	Mason Massey 2	George Ingram 26; Lee Leslie 1 Adam Brooks 3 Keith Wolfe 3
Chevrolet 17 Toyota 16	B. J. McLeod Motorsports	78	Jesse Little 23	Adam Brooks 24; Keith Wolfe 8 George Ingram 1
Chevrolet 17 Toyota 16	B. J. McLeod Motorsports	78	Ryan Ellis 1	Adam Brooks 24; Keith Wolfe 8 George Ingram 1
Chevrolet 17 Toyota 16	B. J. McLeod Motorsports	78	Andy Lally 1	Adam Brooks 24; Keith Wolfe 8 George Ingram 1
Chevrolet 17 Toyota 16	B. J. McLeod Motorsports	78	Mason Massey 5	Adam Brooks 24; Keith Wolfe 8 George Ingram 1
Chevrolet 17 Toyota 16	B. J. McLeod Motorsports	78	Stefan Parsons 1	Adam Brooks 24; Keith Wolfe 8 George Ingram 1
Chevrolet 17 Toyota 16	B. J. McLeod Motorsports	78	Akinori Ogata 1	Adam Brooks 24; Keith Wolfe 8 George Ingram 1
Chevrolet 17 Toyota 16	B. J. McLeod Motorsports	78	Sheldon Creed 1 (Note: Entry was fielded in a collaboration with Richard Childress Racing.)	Adam Brooks 24; Keith Wolfe 8 George Ingram 1
Chevrolet 16 Toyota 13 Ford 4	B. J. McLeod Motorsports	99	Stefan Parsons 8	Keith Wolfe 20; George Ingram 7 Adam Brooks 6
Chevrolet 16 Toyota 13 Ford 4	B. J. McLeod Motorsports	99	Andy Lally 1 (Note: At the Daytona Road Course race, which did not have qualifying, Andy Lally was initially entered in the No. 03 car for Our Motorsports, which was excluded due to the team being too low in owner points as there were over 40 cars on the entry list. As a result, Our partnered with B. J. McLeod Motorsports, and Lally moved to that team's No. 99 car, replacing Josh Bilicki, who was originally scheduled to drive it in that race.)	Keith Wolfe 20; George Ingram 7 Adam Brooks 6
Chevrolet 16 Toyota 13 Ford 4	B. J. McLeod Motorsports	99	Mason Massey 5	Keith Wolfe 20; George Ingram 7 Adam Brooks 6
Chevrolet 16 Toyota 13 Ford 4	B. J. McLeod Motorsports	99	Ryan Ellis 5	Keith Wolfe 20; George Ingram 7 Adam Brooks 6
Chevrolet 16 Toyota 13 Ford 4	B. J. McLeod Motorsports	99	B. J. McLeod 2	Keith Wolfe 20; George Ingram 7 Adam Brooks 6
Chevrolet 16 Toyota 13 Ford 4	B. J. McLeod Motorsports	99	Chase Briscoe 2	Keith Wolfe 20; George Ingram 7 Adam Brooks 6
Chevrolet 16 Toyota 13 Ford 4	B. J. McLeod Motorsports	99	Kevin Harvick 2	Keith Wolfe 20; George Ingram 7 Adam Brooks 6
Chevrolet 16 Toyota 13 Ford 4	B. J. McLeod Motorsports	99	Kyle Tilley 1	Keith Wolfe 20; George Ingram 7 Adam Brooks 6
Chevrolet 16 Toyota 13 Ford 4	B. J. McLeod Motorsports	99	Jesse Little 1	Keith Wolfe 20; George Ingram 7 Adam Brooks 6
Chevrolet 16 Toyota 13 Ford 4	B. J. McLeod Motorsports	99	Sam Mayer (R) 1 (Note: Entry was fielded in a collaboration with JR Motorsports.)	Keith Wolfe 20; George Ingram 7 Adam Brooks 6
Chevrolet 16 Toyota 13 Ford 4	B. J. McLeod Motorsports	99	Matt Mills 3	Keith Wolfe 20; George Ingram 7 Adam Brooks 6
Chevrolet 16 Toyota 13 Ford 4	B. J. McLeod Motorsports	99	J. J. Yeley 2	Keith Wolfe 20; George Ingram 7 Adam Brooks 6
Chevrolet 32 Ford 1	DGM Racing	90	Caesar Bacarella 6	Eddie Troconis 4 Tony Furr 5 (Note: At the Daytona Road Course race, which did not have qualifying, Preston Pardus was initially entered in DGM Racing's No. 91 car, which was excluded due to the team being too low in owner points as there were over 40 cars on the entry list. As a result, he replaced Caesar Bacarella in the No. 90. Tony Furr, who was going to be Pardus's crew chief when he was in the No. 91, made the move with him, replacing Eddie Troconis.); Dan Pardus 3 (Note: At Homestead-Miami, B. J. Tucker was listed on the entry list as crew chief. However, the team stated that Pardus was the actual crew chief.); B. J. Tucker 8 Michelle Gosselin 1 Ryan London 4 Frank Kerr 1 Jeff Green 1 Nathan Kennedy 4 Mario Gosselin 1 Alex Timmerman 1
Chevrolet 32 Ford 1	DGM Racing	90	Preston Pardus 7	Eddie Troconis 4 Tony Furr 5 Dan Pardus 3 B. J. Tucker 8 Michelle Gosselin 1 Ryan London 4 Frank Kerr 1 Jeff Green 1 Nathan Kennedy 4 Mario Gosselin 1 Alex Timmerman 1
Chevrolet 32 Ford 1	DGM Racing	90	Dexter Bean 5	Eddie Troconis 4 Tony Furr 5 Dan Pardus 3 B. J. Tucker 8 Michelle Gosselin 1 Ryan London 4 Frank Kerr 1 Jeff Green 1 Nathan Kennedy 4 Mario Gosselin 1 Alex Timmerman 1
Chevrolet 32 Ford 1	DGM Racing	90	George Gorham Jr. 1	Eddie Troconis 4 Tony Furr 5 Dan Pardus 3 B. J. Tucker 8 Michelle Gosselin 1 Ryan London 4 Frank Kerr 1 Jeff Green 1 Nathan Kennedy 4 Mario Gosselin 1 Alex Timmerman 1
Chevrolet 32 Ford 1	DGM Racing	90	B. J. McLeod 3	Eddie Troconis 4 Tony Furr 5 Dan Pardus 3 B. J. Tucker 8 Michelle Gosselin 1 Ryan London 4 Frank Kerr 1 Jeff Green 1 Nathan Kennedy 4 Mario Gosselin 1 Alex Timmerman 1
Chevrolet 32 Ford 1	DGM Racing	90	Kyle Sieg 1 (Note: Entry was fielded in a collaboration with RSS Racing.)	Eddie Troconis 4 Tony Furr 5 Dan Pardus 3 B. J. Tucker 8 Michelle Gosselin 1 Ryan London 4 Frank Kerr 1 Jeff Green 1 Nathan Kennedy 4 Mario Gosselin 1 Alex Timmerman 1
Chevrolet 32 Ford 1	DGM Racing	90	Ronnie Bassett Jr. 2 (Note: Entries were fielded in a collaboration with Bassett Racing.)	Eddie Troconis 4 Tony Furr 5 Dan Pardus 3 B. J. Tucker 8 Michelle Gosselin 1 Ryan London 4 Frank Kerr 1 Jeff Green 1 Nathan Kennedy 4 Mario Gosselin 1 Alex Timmerman 1
Chevrolet 32 Ford 1	DGM Racing	90	Dillon Bassett 1	Eddie Troconis 4 Tony Furr 5 Dan Pardus 3 B. J. Tucker 8 Michelle Gosselin 1 Ryan London 4 Frank Kerr 1 Jeff Green 1 Nathan Kennedy 4 Mario Gosselin 1 Alex Timmerman 1
Chevrolet 32 Ford 1	DGM Racing	90	Loris Hezemans 1	Eddie Troconis 4 Tony Furr 5 Dan Pardus 3 B. J. Tucker 8 Michelle Gosselin 1 Ryan London 4 Frank Kerr 1 Jeff Green 1 Nathan Kennedy 4 Mario Gosselin 1 Alex Timmerman 1
Chevrolet 32 Ford 1	DGM Racing	90	Spencer Boyd 6	Eddie Troconis 4 Tony Furr 5 Dan Pardus 3 B. J. Tucker 8 Michelle Gosselin 1 Ryan London 4 Frank Kerr 1 Jeff Green 1 Nathan Kennedy 4 Mario Gosselin 1 Alex Timmerman 1
Chevrolet	JD Motorsports	15	Colby Howard 23	Wayne Carroll Jr.
Chevrolet	JD Motorsports	15	Mike Skeen 1	Wayne Carroll Jr.
Chevrolet	JD Motorsports	15	Bayley Currey 7	Wayne Carroll Jr.
Chevrolet	JD Motorsports	15	B. J. McLeod 1	Wayne Carroll Jr.
Toyota	JD Motorsports	15	Kris Wright 1 (Note: Entry was fielded in a collaboration with Sam Hunt Racing.)	Wayne Carroll Jr.
Chevrolet 31 Toyota 1 Ford 1	Jimmy Means Racing	52	Gray Gaulding 21	Tim Brown
Chevrolet 31 Toyota 1 Ford 1	Jimmy Means Racing	52	Joey Gase 5 (Note: At Talladega 2 (Race 28) the entry was fielded in a collaboration with Emerling-Gase Motorsports.)	Tim Brown
Chevrolet 31 Toyota 1 Ford 1	Jimmy Means Racing	52	Spencer Boyd 4	Tim Brown
Chevrolet 31 Toyota 1 Ford 1	Jimmy Means Racing	52	Dave Smith 1	Tim Brown
Chevrolet 31 Toyota 1 Ford 1	Jimmy Means Racing	52	Akinori Ogata 1	Tim Brown
Chevrolet 31 Toyota 1 Ford 1	Jimmy Means Racing	52	Carson Ware 1 (Note: It was a Rick Ware Racing entry using Jimmy Means Racing's owner points.)	Tim Brown
Ford 3 Toyota 29 Chevrolet 1	MBM Motorsports	13	Chad Finchum 5	Mark Hillman 1 Clinton Cram 2 Patrick Magee 7 Sebastian LaForge 19; Doug Richert 3 Johnny Roten 1
Ford 3 Toyota 29 Chevrolet 1	MBM Motorsports	13	David Starr 4	Mark Hillman 1 Clinton Cram 2 Patrick Magee 7 Sebastian LaForge 19; Doug Richert 3 Johnny Roten 1
Ford 3 Toyota 29 Chevrolet 1	MBM Motorsports	13	Loris Hezemans 1	Mark Hillman 1 Clinton Cram 2 Patrick Magee 7 Sebastian LaForge 19; Doug Richert 3 Johnny Roten 1
Ford 3 Toyota 29 Chevrolet 1	MBM Motorsports	13	Matt Jaskol 3	Mark Hillman 1 Clinton Cram 2 Patrick Magee 7 Sebastian LaForge 19; Doug Richert 3 Johnny Roten 1
Ford 3 Toyota 29 Chevrolet 1	MBM Motorsports	13	Jason White 1	Mark Hillman 1 Clinton Cram 2 Patrick Magee 7 Sebastian LaForge 19; Doug Richert 3 Johnny Roten 1
Ford 3 Toyota 29 Chevrolet 1	MBM Motorsports	13	Boris Said 1	Mark Hillman 1 Clinton Cram 2 Patrick Magee 7 Sebastian LaForge 19; Doug Richert 3 Johnny Roten 1
Ford 3 Toyota 29 Chevrolet 1	MBM Motorsports	13	Timmy Hill 15	Mark Hillman 1 Clinton Cram 2 Patrick Magee 7 Sebastian LaForge 19; Doug Richert 3 Johnny Roten 1
Ford 3 Toyota 29 Chevrolet 1	MBM Motorsports	13	Stephen Leicht 3	Mark Hillman 1 Clinton Cram 2 Patrick Magee 7 Sebastian LaForge 19; Doug Richert 3 Johnny Roten 1
Ford 8 Toyota 24 Chevrolet 1	MBM Motorsports	66	Timmy Hill 14	Clinton Cram 1 Mark Hillman 6 Patrick Magee 6 Sebastian LaForge 1 Doug Richert 5 Tim Goulet 1 Johnny Roten 9 Carl Long 1 Michael Contarino 3
Ford 8 Toyota 24 Chevrolet 1	MBM Motorsports	66	Matt Jaskol 4	Clinton Cram 1 Mark Hillman 6 Patrick Magee 6 Sebastian LaForge 1 Doug Richert 5 Tim Goulet 1 Johnny Roten 9 Carl Long 1 Michael Contarino 3
Ford 8 Toyota 24 Chevrolet 1	MBM Motorsports	66	David Starr 11	Clinton Cram 1 Mark Hillman 6 Patrick Magee 6 Sebastian LaForge 1 Doug Richert 5 Tim Goulet 1 Johnny Roten 9 Carl Long 1 Michael Contarino 3
Ford 8 Toyota 24 Chevrolet 1	MBM Motorsports	66	C. J. McLaughlin 1	Clinton Cram 1 Mark Hillman 6 Patrick Magee 6 Sebastian LaForge 1 Doug Richert 5 Tim Goulet 1 Johnny Roten 9 Carl Long 1 Michael Contarino 3
Ford 8 Toyota 24 Chevrolet 1	MBM Motorsports	66	Jason White 2	Clinton Cram 1 Mark Hillman 6 Patrick Magee 6 Sebastian LaForge 1 Doug Richert 5 Tim Goulet 1 Johnny Roten 9 Carl Long 1 Michael Contarino 3
Ford 8 Toyota 24 Chevrolet 1	MBM Motorsports	66	Loris Hezemans 1	Clinton Cram 1 Mark Hillman 6 Patrick Magee 6 Sebastian LaForge 1 Doug Richert 5 Tim Goulet 1 Johnny Roten 9 Carl Long 1 Michael Contarino 3
Ford	RSS Racing with Reaume Brothers Racing 2 Our Motorsports 31 (Note: Entry at Homestead was an Our Motorsports entry using RSS/Reaume Brothers Racing's owner points.)	23	Jason White 1	Paul Clapprood 3 Danny Johnson 12; Matt Swiderski 2 Jonathan Stewart 1 Kenneth Roettger Jr. 11; Billy Scott 2 Ronnie Osmer 2
Chevrolet	RSS Racing with Reaume Brothers Racing 2 Our Motorsports 31	23	Natalie Decker 5	Paul Clapprood 3 Danny Johnson 12; Matt Swiderski 2 Jonathan Stewart 1 Kenneth Roettger Jr. 11; Billy Scott 2 Ronnie Osmer 2
Chevrolet	RSS Racing with Reaume Brothers Racing 2 Our Motorsports 31	23	Tyler Reddick 4 (Note: At the Homestead–Miami Speedway race, which did not have qualifying, Tyler Reddick was initially entered in the No. 03 car for Our Motorsports, which was excluded due to the team being too low in owner points as there were over 40 cars on the entry list. As a result, Our partnered with RSS/Reaume Brothers Racing, and Reddick moved to that team's No. 23 car, which had previously been TBA on the entry list. After that, Our purchased RSS/Reaume Brothers Racing's owner points and would field the No. 23 car for the rest of the season.)	Paul Clapprood 3 Danny Johnson 12; Matt Swiderski 2 Jonathan Stewart 1 Kenneth Roettger Jr. 11; Billy Scott 2 Ronnie Osmer 2
Chevrolet	RSS Racing with Reaume Brothers Racing 2 Our Motorsports 31	23	Blaine Perkins 8	Paul Clapprood 3 Danny Johnson 12; Matt Swiderski 2 Jonathan Stewart 1 Kenneth Roettger Jr. 11; Billy Scott 2 Ronnie Osmer 2
Chevrolet	RSS Racing with Reaume Brothers Racing 2 Our Motorsports 31	23	Tanner Berryhill 3	Paul Clapprood 3 Danny Johnson 12; Matt Swiderski 2 Jonathan Stewart 1 Kenneth Roettger Jr. 11; Billy Scott 2 Ronnie Osmer 2
Chevrolet	RSS Racing with Reaume Brothers Racing 2 Our Motorsports 31	23	J. J. Yeley 1	Paul Clapprood 3 Danny Johnson 12; Matt Swiderski 2 Jonathan Stewart 1 Kenneth Roettger Jr. 11; Billy Scott 2 Ronnie Osmer 2
Chevrolet	RSS Racing with Reaume Brothers Racing 2 Our Motorsports 31	23	Andy Lally 2	Paul Clapprood 3 Danny Johnson 12; Matt Swiderski 2 Jonathan Stewart 1 Kenneth Roettger Jr. 11; Billy Scott 2 Ronnie Osmer 2
Chevrolet	RSS Racing with Reaume Brothers Racing 2 Our Motorsports 31	23	Ty Dillon 4	Paul Clapprood 3 Danny Johnson 12; Matt Swiderski 2 Jonathan Stewart 1 Kenneth Roettger Jr. 11; Billy Scott 2 Ronnie Osmer 2
Chevrolet	RSS Racing with Reaume Brothers Racing 2 Our Motorsports 31	23	Patrick Emerling 3	Paul Clapprood 3 Danny Johnson 12; Matt Swiderski 2 Jonathan Stewart 1 Kenneth Roettger Jr. 11; Billy Scott 2 Ronnie Osmer 2
Chevrolet	RSS Racing with Reaume Brothers Racing 2 Our Motorsports 31	23	Austin Dillon 2	Paul Clapprood 3 Danny Johnson 12; Matt Swiderski 2 Jonathan Stewart 1 Kenneth Roettger Jr. 11; Billy Scott 2 Ronnie Osmer 2
Chevrolet 26 Ford 5 Toyota 2	SS-Green Light Racing with Rick Ware Racing	17	Cody Ware 7	Jason Miller 28; Mike Hillman Sr. 2 Mike Tyska 1 Joe Williams Jr. 2
Chevrolet 26 Ford 5 Toyota 2	SS-Green Light Racing with Rick Ware Racing	17	J. J. Yeley 11	Jason Miller 28; Mike Hillman Sr. 2 Mike Tyska 1 Joe Williams Jr. 2
Chevrolet 26 Ford 5 Toyota 2	SS-Green Light Racing with Rick Ware Racing	17	Garrett Smithley 4	Jason Miller 28; Mike Hillman Sr. 2 Mike Tyska 1 Joe Williams Jr. 2
Chevrolet 26 Ford 5 Toyota 2	SS-Green Light Racing with Rick Ware Racing	17	Joey Gase 1	Jason Miller 28; Mike Hillman Sr. 2 Mike Tyska 1 Joe Williams Jr. 2
Chevrolet 26 Ford 5 Toyota 2	SS-Green Light Racing with Rick Ware Racing	17	Cole Custer 1	Jason Miller 28; Mike Hillman Sr. 2 Mike Tyska 1 Joe Williams Jr. 2
Chevrolet 26 Ford 5 Toyota 2	SS-Green Light Racing with Rick Ware Racing	17	Joe Graf Jr. 3	Jason Miller 28; Mike Hillman Sr. 2 Mike Tyska 1 Joe Williams Jr. 2
Chevrolet 26 Ford 5 Toyota 2	SS-Green Light Racing with Rick Ware Racing	17	Carson Ware 4	Jason Miller 28; Mike Hillman Sr. 2 Mike Tyska 1 Joe Williams Jr. 2
Chevrolet 26 Ford 5 Toyota 2	SS-Green Light Racing with Rick Ware Racing	17	Josh Bilicki 1	Jason Miller 28; Mike Hillman Sr. 2 Mike Tyska 1 Joe Williams Jr. 2
Chevrolet 26 Ford 5 Toyota 2	SS-Green Light Racing with Rick Ware Racing	17	Mason Massey 1 (Note: Entry was fielded in a collaboration with B. J. McLeod Motorsports.)	Jason Miller 28; Mike Hillman Sr. 2 Mike Tyska 1 Joe Williams Jr. 2

=== Limited schedule ===
Manufacturer	Team	No.	Race driver	Crew chief	Rounds
Chevrolet	ACG Motorsports	25	Chris Cockrum	Jeff Spraker	1
Chevrolet	B. J. McLeod Motorsports	76	Stefan Parsons	Keith Wolfe	1
Chevrolet	Bassett Racing	77	Ronnie Bassett Jr.	Nathan Kennedy 13; Mike McCoige 1 Ronald Bassett Sr. 1	8
Chevrolet	Bassett Racing	77	Dillon Bassett	Nathan Kennedy 13; Mike McCoige 1 Ronald Bassett Sr. 1	6
Chevrolet	Bassett Racing	77	Austin Dillon	Nathan Kennedy 13; Mike McCoige 1 Ronald Bassett Sr. 1	1
Chevrolet	DGM Racing	91	Mario Gosselin	Dexter Bean	1
Chevrolet	DGM Racing	91	Preston Pardus	Tony Furr	2
Chevrolet	Our Motorsports	03	Tyler Reddick	Danny Johnson 3 Ronnie Osmer 7	2
Chevrolet	Our Motorsports	03	Andy Lally	Danny Johnson 3 Ronnie Osmer 7	8
Chevrolet	Reaume Brothers Racing	33	Loris Hezemans	Josh Reaume	1
Ford	RSS Racing	38	Ryan Sieg	Shane Wilson	1
Toyota	Joe Gibbs Racing	81	Ty Gibbs (R)	Chris Gayle	1
Toyota	MBM Motorsports	42	Chad Finchum	Doug Richert	1
Toyota	MBM Motorsports	42	Timmy Hill	Sebastian LaForge	1
Toyota	MBM Motorsports	42	Giorgio Maggi	Danny Gill	1
Toyota	Sam Hunt Racing	24	Will Rodgers	Clinton Cram	1

=== Changes ===
==== Teams ====
- On September 22, 2020, Kaulig Racing owner Matt Kaulig revealed on reporter Kelly Crandall's podcast that he hoped that his team would expand to three full-time cars plus one part-time car for the 2021 season. The team did end up expanding to three full-time cars, as the No. 16 of A. J. Allmendinger will go from part-time to full-time. In terms of the fourth part-time car, Ross Chastain appears to be a potential driver for it, as he has expressed interest in continuing with the team part-time after he moves to the Cup Series full-time.
- On November 4, 2020, it was announced that Rick Ware Racing would be fielding two full-time Xfinity Series teams. The team returned to the series to attempt two races in late 2020 after about a year and a half away, reviving the No. 17 car. Despite this announcement, it was later revealed on February 6, 2021 that RWR would only be fielding the No. 17, which would have an alliance with SS-Green Light Racing, similar to the partnership they had with them for No. 07 car in 2020. On April 6, 2021, RWR announced that the No. 17 driven by Joey Gase would be renumbered to the No. 28 with a Havoline-inspired paint scheme for the Talladega race to honor the late Davey Allison. Gase would also drive the No. 28 (renumbered from the No. 53) at the spring Talladega Cup race.
- On December 3, 2020, it was revealed that DGM Racing would be fielding a fourth car for the first time, with team owner Mario Gosselin piloting the No. 91 in the season-opener at Daytona for his first Xfinity start as a driver since 2017. The car was also on the entry list the following week at the Daytona Road Course with Preston Pardus, but it was excluded from the field due to lack of owner points with the entry list having over 40 cars, and Pardus replaced Caesar Bacarella in the team's No. 90. It is unclear if the car will attempt additional races later in the season.
- On December 10, 2020, Richard Childress Racing announced the revival of their No. 2 car, which will be driven full-time by Myatt Snider, who drove for them part-time in 2020. It has yet to be announced if RCR's No. 21 will run part-time in, or not run at all 2021.
- On December 11, 2020, Our Motorsports announced that they would be expanding to two full-time cars in the Xfinity Series in 2021. The second car will be driven by multiple drivers, beginning with 2018 and 2019 series champion Tyler Reddick at Daytona, Whelen Modified Tour driver Patrick Emerling, ARCA Menards Series West driver Blaine Perkins, and additional drivers that have yet to be announced. Team owner Chris Our confirmed on SiriusXM NASCAR Radio on December 14, 2020 that the number would be the No. 03. After the No. 03 failed to qualify for the races with no practice and qualifying due to owner points with entry lists of over 40 cars, Our Motorsports purchased the points of the No. 23 car from RSS/Reaume Brothers Racing for the remainder of the season starting at Las Vegas in March.
- On January 19, 2021, Big Machine Records founder Scott Borchetta announced that he and the company were starting a full-time Xfinity Series team, Big Machine Racing, which will field the No. 48 Chevrolet. The team bought cars and equipment from RSS Racing/Reaume Brothers Racing's No. 93 car in 2020.
- On January 21, 2021, it was announced that the RSS Racing/Reaume Brothers Racing No. 93 car would be renumbered to the No. 23 for 2021, and that the team would receive newer cars and equipment that were previously used by the RSS No. 39 car, which switches to Ford in 2021. The old No. 93 cars and equipment were sold to Big Machine Racing.
- On January 25, 2021, Jordan Anderson Racing announced that they would be expanding into the Xfinity Series in 2021, fielding the No. 31 car full-time for driver/team owner Jordan Anderson, competing for Rookie of the Year honors. The team used Chevrolets acquired from Richard Childress Racing.
- On February 2, 2021, it was announced that the Bassett brothers, Ronnie and Dillon, would be starting their own Xfinity team for 2021, the No. 77 Chevrolet, which would be fielded full-time with both of them as well as other drivers sharing the car.
- On February 23, 2021, Joe Gibbs Racing revealed that they would be fielding a fifth car, the No. 81, at Road America for Ty Gibbs, which is a race where Kyle Busch will be in the No. 54, the car that Gibbs is running his part-time schedule for the team in.
- On March 5, 2021, it was announced that Whelen Euro Series driver Loris Hezemans, who made his Xfinity debut in 2019 at Road America, would return to the series to make two starts, both on ovals, in the MBM Motorsports No. 13. In those two races, the car will be fielded in a collaboration with Reaume Brothers Racing. MBM owner Carl Long said on Facebook the following day that the deal for RBR to partner with his team for Hezemans' races came as a result of Reaume's own No. 23 car being sold to Our Motorsports.

==== Drivers ====
- On September 15, 2020, it was announced that 2019 and 2020 ARCA Menards Series East champion Sam Mayer would move up to the Xfinity Series, driving the JR Motorsports No. 8 car. He will run the second half of the 2021 season after he turns 18 and is eligible to race in the series before running full-time for them in 2022.
- On September 21, 2020, it was announced that Ross Chastain would be moving up to the Cup Series full-time in 2021, driving the No. 42 for Chip Ganassi Racing, therefore vacating the No. 10 for Kaulig Racing, his full-time Xfinity ride in 2020. Chastain then revealed on September 22 that he has plans to return to the team for a part-time schedule, although this did not end up happening.
- On October 22, 2020, it was announced that JR Motorsports CARS Late Model Stock Tour driver and 2020 NASCAR Advance Auto Parts Weekly Series champion Josh Berry would race in the Xfinity Series part-time for JRM, sharing the team's No. 8 car with Mayer. Berry will drive in 12 races during the first half of the season before Mayer's 18th birthday. He drove part-time in the Xfinity Series for the team from 2014 to 2016 as well as one start with Obaika Racing in 2016 and another with NextGen Motorsports in 2017, which was his most recent start in the series.
- On November 12, 2020, Joe Gibbs Racing announced that Daniel Hemric would drive their No. 18 full-time in 2021, replacing Riley Herbst. Hemric drove the JR Motorsports No. 8 part-time in 2020. On November 12, 2020, Frontstretch reported that Herbst is expected to go to Stewart Haas Racing to drive their No. 98 full-time in 2021, replacing Chase Briscoe, who moved up to SHR's No. 14 car in the Cup Series, replacing the recently retired Clint Bowyer. The official announcement of Herbst driving the No. 98 came on December 10, 2020.
- On November 16, 2020, Kaulig Racing announced that Jeb Burton would drive their No. 10 full-time in 2020, replacing Ross Chastain, who moved up to the Cup Series full-time in 2021 with Chip Ganassi Racing in the No. 42 car. Burton previously spent a number of years in the series running part-time for various teams, most recently the No. 8 for JR Motorsports in 2019 and 2020.
- On December 1, 2020, Kaulig Racing announced that A. J. Allmendinger would drive the No. 16 full-time in 2021, after driving for the team part-time for the previous two years (in the No. 16 in 2020 and the No. 10 in 2019) with much success.
- On December 3, 2020, it was revealed that Caesar Bacarella would be expanding his part-time schedule with DGM Racing to between 10 and 15 races in 2021, after previously running 6 and 3 races for them in 2020 and 2019, respectively. All of his starts have come in the team's No. 90 car, which will be the entry he drives again in 2021. Bacarella hopes to eventually drive full-time with DGM.
- On December 8, 2020, it was reported that ex-Formula 3 and Formula 2 and current IndyCar Series driver Santino Ferrucci could be coming to NASCAR to run up to 20 Xfinity Series races with Our Motorsports in 2021. On January 8, 2021, it was announced that Ferrucci joined Sam Hunt Racing to drive part-time on mile-and-a-half tracks for the season. Brandon Gdovic and Kris Wright will also make a few starts for Sam Hunt.
- On December 8, 2020, B. J. McLeod Motorsports announced that Jesse Little would drive the No. 78 full-time in 2021. Little drove the No. 4 car for JD Motorsports in 2020.
- On December 10, 2020, it was announced that Myatt Snider would return to Richard Childress Racing in 2021, driving the No. 2 full-time after driving the No. 21 part-time in 2020. This will be his second full season in the Xfinity Series, as he ran the rest of the races in 2020 in the No. 93 for RSS/Reaume Brothers Racing.
- On December 14, 2020, it was announced that Patrick Emerling would return to run another part-time schedule with Our Motorsports, although now in the No. 03 as Brett Moffitt is running full-time in the No. 02 that Emerling drove in his one start in 2020. With Our Motorsports acquiring the No. 23 car from RSS/Reaume Brothers Racing, Emerling drove the No. 23 instead of the No. 03.
- On December 23, 2020, MBM Motorsports owner Carl Long posted on Facebook that the team is looking for a driver who brings sponsorship to run full-time in one of their Xfinity cars. This driver will join Timmy Hill, Chad Finchum and Stephen Leicht, who were previously announced to return to MBM in 2021. On February 11, 2021, it was announced that David Starr would drive the team's No. 13 full-time, although he would not run the season-opener at Daytona. He drove for MBM in three Cup Series races in 2017. When the No. 13 started to fail to qualify for races without practice and qualifying due to being too low in owner points, Starr would instead drive either the No. 61 or No. 66 for MBM.
- On January 11, 2021, it was announced that Miguel Paludo would be returning to NASCAR and would drive the JR Motorsports No. 8 in the road course races at the Daytona RC, COTA, and Mid-Ohio. This was his first time in the Xfinity Series since 2012 and first time in NASCAR since 2013 in the Truck Series. After being unable to find a NASCAR ride for 2014, Paludo returned to his home country of Brazil and has competed in the Porsche GT3 Carrera Cup Series since 2015.
- On January 19, 2021, Jade Buford was announced as the driver of the Big Machine Racing's No. 48 in 2021, running full-time and for Rookie of the Year. Buford drove in the Xfinity Series road course races in 2020 for SS-Green Light Racing with Big Machine Records as his sponsor. He was not approved by NASCAR to race at Daytona to start the season, so his first race will be at the Daytona Road Course the following week. Buford has only competed on road courses in a stock car. On Point Motorsports Truck Series driver Danny Bohn made his Xfinity debut substituting for Buford at Daytona.
- On January 22, 2021, JD Motorsports announced that Landon Cassill would return full-time to the Xfinity Series in the No. 4 Chevrolet, replacing Jesse Little, who left for B. J. McLeod Motorsports. Cassill previously drove for Shepherd Racing Ventures, starting and parking their No. 89 early in the season. When Shepherd's team stopped attempting races after COVID-19, Cassill was without a ride for the rest of 2020. Cassill has driven for JDM in the past, including in 2014 where he finished 12th in the standings.
- On January 25, 2021, it was announced that Ryan Vargas would drive full-time for JD Motorsports in 2021 in the team's No. 6 car and competing for Rookie of the Year honors. Vargas previously drove JDM's No. 15 part-time in 2019 and the Nos. 6 and 15 in 2020.
- On February 5, 2021, RSS Racing and Reaume Brothers Racing announced that Natalie Decker would make her Xfinity debut at the Daytona Road Course, the first of five races she would run in their No. 23. After Our Motorsports partnered with the two teams to operate the No. 23 car for the rest of the season beginning at Las Vegas in March, it was confirmed that Decker would still be in the car for the four remaining races on her schedule. Our had yet to select a driver to be in the No. 03 for all four of those races.
- On March 31, 2021, NASCAR announced that drivers Josh Reaume and Mike Wallace had been reinstated. Both drivers were suspended after making posts on social media in November and September 2020, respectfully, that violated Sections 12.1 and 12.8.1.e (member conduct guidelines) of the NASCAR Rule Book. Reaume competed in two Xfinity Series races in 2020, one for Mike Harmon Racing and the other for his own team, Reaume Brothers Racing (with RSS Racing). Wallace competed in three of the road course races in the series in 2020 for JD Motorsports.
- On May 3, 2021, Our Motorsports announced that Tanner Berryhill would drive the No. 23 at Darlington in May and both Texas races. This is Berryhill's first start in the series since 2014 (although he did have 1 DNQ in both 2015 and 2018), and first start in NASCAR since 2018, when he drove for Obaika Racing in the last two races of the Cup Series season.
- On May 10, 2021, it was revealed through the release of the entry list for the race at Dover that JD Motorsports drivers Landon Cassill (No. 4), and Ryan Vargas (No. 6), would be switching cars for that race. The move was made because the following week's race at Circuit of the Americas will have qualifying and a field of 36 cars instead of 40, and Vargas' No. 6 is low enough in owner points (37th before the race at Dover) that it has a chance of failing to qualify while the No. 4 is high enough (21st) to qualify.
- On May 14, 2021, Kaulig Racing announced that Zane Smith would drive the No. 11 at Dover as a substitute for Justin Haley, who was sidelined in accordance with team and COVID-19 protocols. This will be Smith's first race since he drove the No. 8 part-time for JR Motorsports in 2019.
- On May 21, 2021, 2000 NASCAR Busch Series Champion Jeff Green announced his retirement from both racing and crew chiefing in NASCAR.
- On July 8, Rick Ware Racing announced that Andrew Ranger, their NASCAR Pinty's Series driver, would drive the No. 17 entry at New Hampshire, but the deal fell through and J. J. Yeley drove the car instead of Ranger.
- On July 10, 2021, JR Motorsports announced that Austin Dillon would drive the No. 1 car at Atlanta as a substitute for Michael Annett, who suffered a leg injury while he was exercising a few weeks before. On July 12, Josh Berry was announced as Annett's substitute at New Hampshire. Despite missing the two races, Annett was granted a playoff waiver by NASCAR. After returning at Watkins Glen, Annett's injury worsened when competing in that race and as a result, he did not run the next two races. Annett was replaced by Chase Elliott at the Indy Road Course and Berry at Michigan. Berry again drove the No. 1 at Bristol, Las Vegas (a race which he would win) and Talladega after Annett reinjured his leg while working out. Annett returned from his injury for the race at the Charlotte Roval and would also drive the car at Texas and Kansas.
- On August 31, 2021, Jordan Anderson Racing announced that Austin Dillon would drive the No. 31 at the Sport Clips Haircuts VFW Help a Hero 200 at Darlington.
- On September 4, 2021, Our Motorsports announced that Ty Dillon would drive the No. 02 that day in the race at Darlington as a substitute for Brett Moffitt, who was out for unspecified medical reasons. Dillon would also fill in for Moffitt at the Richmond fall race. On September 22, Jordan Anderson Racing announced that Dillon would drive their No. 31 at Las Vegas.
- On September 10, 2021, JD Motorsports announced that Colby Howard would not be driving their No. 15 car for the remainder of the season starting at Richmond. This came after Howard announced that he would leave the team to drive for McAnally–Hilgemann Racing full-time in the Truck Series in 2022. Bayley Currey would drive the car at Richmond, Las Vegas, Talladega, Texas and Kansas, B. J. McLeod drove it at Bristol, and Kris Wright drove it at the Charlotte Roval.
- On October 20, 2021, NASCAR and SS-Green Light Racing indefinitely suspended Carson Ware after he was arrested on a misdemeanor charge of assaulting a female, simple assault, and injury to personal property. Ware, who was going to drive the SSGLR No. 17 in that weekend's race at Kansas, was replaced by Garrett Smithley.

==== Crew chiefs ====
- On November 13, 2020, it was announced that Travis Mack, previously the crew chief for Michael Annett and the No. 1 car for JR Motorsports, would be leaving for the new Trackhouse Racing Team in the Cup Series to crew chief Daniel Suárez's No. 99 car.
- On November 17, 2020, Joe Gibbs Racing announced changes to their crew chief lineup in 2021.
  - Chris Gayle, previously the crew chief of JGR's No. 20 Cup Series team, will move to the Xfinity Series and be the crew chief of the No. 54 team, replacing Jacob Canter, who was serving as that team's crew chief in addition to his position as JGR's test team manager.
  - Jason Ratcliff, previously the crew chief of the JGR-aligned No. 95 Leavine Family Racing team in the Cup Series, which has closed down, will move back to the Xfinity Series and crew chief the No. 20 of Harrison Burton, replacing Ben Beshore. Ratcliff previously crew chiefed the same car when it was driven by Christopher Bell.
  - Ben Beshore will move to the Cup Series and replace Adam Stevens (who moves to the No. 20 JGR Cup team, replacing Gayle) as the crew chief of the No. 18 of Kyle Busch.
- On November 23, 2020, Mark Setzer, previously a JD Motorsports crew chief, tweeted that he would be moving to the Jeremy Clements Racing No. 51 team as its crew chief in 2021. He replaces Andrew Abbott, who moved over to Sam Hunt Racing to crew chief their No. 26 car, replacing Eddie Troconis, who became the crew chief of the Young's Motorsports No. 02 in the Truck Series.
- On December 10, 2020, JR Motorsports announced that Mike Bumgarner, who spent the previous seven years as the team's director of race operations, would serve as the crew chief for the No. 1 of Michael Annett. JRM has yet to announce who will replace Bumgarner as the director of race operations when he returns to crew chiefing.
- On December 14, 2020, JD Motorsports announced that Wayne Carroll Jr. would be Colby Howard's crew chief in 2021 on the No. 15 car. Carroll crew chiefed JDM's No. 6 car in most of the races in 2020. Howard was crew chiefed by Mark Setzer, who left the team for the No. 51 of Jeremy Clements, in all but one of his starts in 2020. (Carroll crew chiefed Howard in the one race where Setzer did not).
- On December 14, 2020, Danny Johnson was announced as the crew chief of Our Motorsports' new second full-time car, the No. 03. He previously was with Martins Motorsports, working as their crew chief during the first half of the 2020 season.
- On January 19, 2021, it was announced that Patrick Donahue would be the crew chief for the new Big Machine Racing and the No. 48 of Jade Buford. Donahue worked for SS-Green Light Racing for the last three years, crew chiefing Joey Gase in 2018, Gray Gaulding in 2019, and Joe Graf Jr. in 2020. On February 5, 2021, first-year crew chief Mike Tyska, who previously worked at Germain Racing, GMS Racing, and Rick Ware Racing during his career, was announced as Graf's new crew chief, replacing Donahue.
- On January 27, 2021, Kaulig Racing announced that Jason Trinchere, who had served as the lead race engineer on the No. 11 car driven by Justin Haley during the 2020 season, would serve as crew chief for the No. 16 driven by A. J. Allmendinger. It was also announced that Matt Swiderski, who was previously the crew chief for Team Penske's part-time No. 12 car in the Xfinity Series, would join Kaulig to serve as crew chief for their part-time Cup team, the No. 16, driven by Kaz Grala, Allmendinger, and other drivers.
- On February 1, 2021, it had been announced that Shannon Rursch would become the full-time crew chief of Josh Williams' No. 92 for DGM Racing. Williams worked with a rotation of 12 different crew chiefs in 2020. However, this did not end up happening, as instead of Rursch, Ryan London was listed as the team's crew chief for the first two races of the season and then Eddie Troconis was for the next two races. All three of them also work for other teams in addition to the No. 92. (Rursch works for Venturini Motorsports in ARCA while London and Troconis work for Young's Motorsports in the Truck Series.) Steven Hazelbaker made his crew chiefing debut at Phoenix in March with Williams and the No. 92.
- On February 2, 2021, it was announced that DGM Racing crew chief Nathan Kennedy would move with the Bassett brothers, who both previously drove part-time for DGM, to their new team in the series, the No. 77.
- On April 1, 2021, it was announced that Mark Hillman, who had joined MBM Motorsports at the start of the season to crew chief Timmy Hill and their No. 66 Xfinity Series car, would be leaving for McAnally–Hilgemann Racing to be the crew chief for Derek Kraus in the Truck Series.
- On May 3, 2021, RSS Racing announced that Shane Wilson would rejoin the team as the crew chief for Ryan Sieg's No. 39. He was the crew chief for the same car in 2019. He left for David Gilliland Racing to crew chief Tanner Gray's No. 15 in the Truck Series in 2020. DGR released him on April 30, 2021. On August 18, 2021, NASCAR announced that Wilson would be suspended for four races after the car lost its left rear tire and caused a caution during the Indy Road Course race. Later in the day, RSS Racing announced that Wilson would be completely relieved of his duties, and Kevin Starland returned as Sieg's crew chief starting at Michigan.

==== Interim crew chiefs ====
- On June 14, 2021, Dustin Albino from Jayski tweeted that Jason Trinchere, the crew chief of Kaulig Racing's No. 16 car driven by A. J. Allmendinger, would miss the race at Nashville because his wife was expecting a baby. Justin Cox would be the interim crew chief for the team in that race. Cox was one of multiple crew chiefs of the No. 16 in 2020 when Allmedinger ran part-time in the car.
- On September 4, 2021, JR Motorsports announced that engineer Allen Hart would fill in as crew chief for Justin Allgaier and the No. 7 team in that day's race at Darlington, as Jason Burdett was forced to miss the race due to COVID-19 protocols. Jason Ratcliff, the crew chief for Harrison Burton's No. 20, also had to miss the race (Joe Gibbs Racing did not announce why), and engineer Dustin Zacharyasz filled in as crew chief.
- On October 26, 2021, NASCAR suspended Our Motorsports No. 23 crew chief Kenneth Roettger Jr. for four Xfinity points races after the car lost a ballast during the Kansas playoff race. Ronnie Osmer, who crew chiefed the team's No. 03 car when it did not qualify for races due to being too low in owner points, would fill in as the interim crew chief of the No. 23.

==== Manufacturers ====
- On January 11, 2021, after over 10 seasons with Chevrolet and ECR Engines, RSS Racing announced its manufacturer switch to Ford, with engines supplied by Roush-Yates Engines. However, this change would only be for the team's No. 39 car, as the No. 23 (previously No. 93) car, fielded jointly with Reaume Brothers Racing and later Our Motorsports, as well as their ARCA car, would still remain Chevrolets.

== Schedule ==
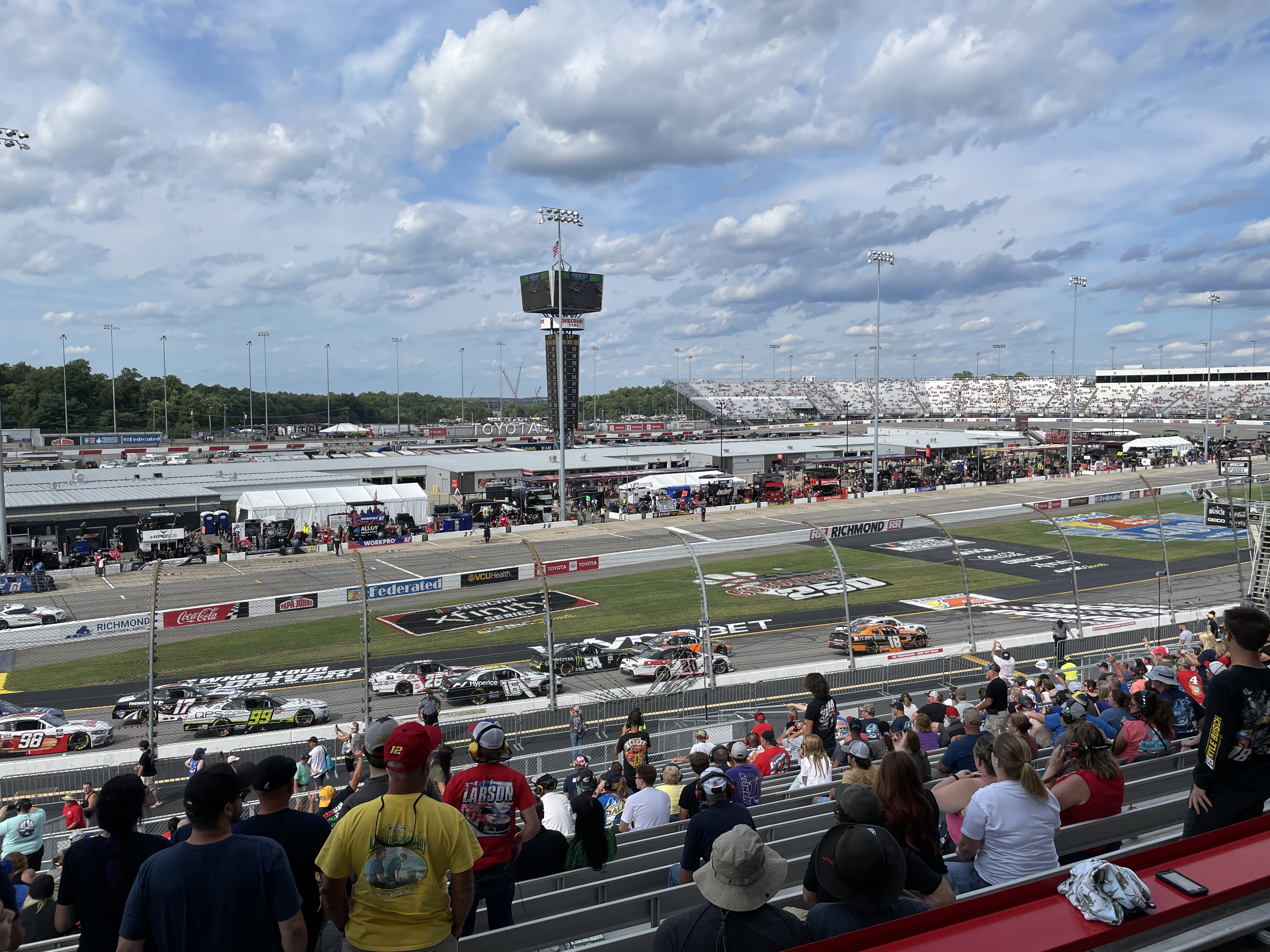
The Go Bowling 250 at Richmond Raceway in September

Daytona, Phoenix, Texas, and Circuit of the Americas revealed their race dates ahead of the release of the entire schedule, which NASCAR announced on October 30, 2020.

Note: The Dash 4 Cash races (the spring races at Martinsville, Talladega, Darlington and Dover) are listed in bold.

No	Race title	Track	Location	Date
1	Beef. It's What's for Dinner. 300	Daytona International Speedway	Daytona Beach, Florida	February 13
2	Super Start Batteries 188	Daytona International Speedway (Road Course)	Daytona Beach, Florida	February 20
3	Contender Boats 250	Homestead–Miami Speedway	Homestead, Florida	February 27
4	Alsco Uniforms 300	Las Vegas Motor Speedway	Las Vegas, Nevada	March 6
5	Call 811 Before You Dig 200	Phoenix Raceway	Phoenix, Arizona	March 13
6	EchoPark 250	Atlanta Motor Speedway	Hampton, Georgia	March 20
7	**Cook Out 250**	Martinsville Speedway	Ridgeway, Virginia	April 9–11
8	**Ag-Pro 300**	Talladega Superspeedway	Lincoln, Alabama	April 24
9	**Steakhouse Elite 200**	Darlington Raceway	Darlington, South Carolina	May 8
10	**Drydene 200**	Dover International Speedway	Dover, Delaware	May 15
11	Pit Boss 250	Circuit of the Americas	Austin, Texas	May 22
12	Alsco Uniforms 300	Charlotte Motor Speedway	Concord, North Carolina	May 29
13	B&L Transport 170	Mid-Ohio Sports Car Course	Lexington, Ohio	June 5
14	Alsco Uniforms 250	Texas Motor Speedway	Fort Worth, Texas	June 12
15	Tennessee Lottery 250	Nashville Superspeedway	Lebanon, Tennessee	June 19
16	Pocono Green 225	Pocono Raceway	Blakeslee, Pennsylvania	June 27
17	Henry 180	Road America	Elkhart Lake, Wisconsin	July 3
18	Credit Karma Money 250	Atlanta Motor Speedway	Hampton, Georgia	July 10
19	Ambetter Get Vaccinated 200	New Hampshire Motor Speedway	Loudon, New Hampshire	July 17
20	Skrewball Peanut Butter Whiskey 200 at The Glen	Watkins Glen International	Watkins Glen, New York	August 7
21	Pennzoil 150	Indianapolis Motor Speedway (Road Course)	Speedway, Indiana	August 14
22	New Holland 250	Michigan International Speedway	Cambridge Township, Michigan	August 21
23	Wawa 250	Daytona International Speedway	Daytona Beach, Florida	August 27
24	Sport Clips Haircuts VFW 200	Darlington Raceway	Darlington, South Carolina	September 4
25	Go Bowling 250	Richmond Raceway	Richmond, Virginia	September 11
26	Food City 300	Bristol Motor Speedway	Bristol, Tennessee	September 17
NASCAR Xfinity Series Playoffs
Round of 12
27	Alsco Uniforms 302	Las Vegas Motor Speedway	Las Vegas, Nevada	September 25
28	Sparks 300	Talladega Superspeedway	Lincoln, Alabama	October 2
29	Drive for the Cure 250 presented by Blue Cross/Blue Shield of North Carolina	Charlotte Motor Speedway (Roval)	Concord, North Carolina	October 9
Round of 8
30	Andy's Frozen Custard 335	Texas Motor Speedway	Fort Worth, Texas	October 16
31	Kansas Lottery 300	Kansas Speedway	Kansas City, Kansas	October 23
32	Dead On Tools 250	Martinsville Speedway	Ridgeway, Virginia	October 30
Championship 4
33	NASCAR Xfinity Series Championship Race	Phoenix Raceway	Phoenix, Arizona	November 6

=== Schedule changes ===
- Circuit of the Americas (in Austin, Texas) is added for the first time.
- Nashville Superspeedway returns for the first time since 2011.
- Auto Club Speedway, Chicagoland Speedway, Iowa Speedway and Kentucky Speedway are removed from the schedule.
  - Auto Club Speedway was initially on the schedule, but was replaced by an event at the Daytona Road Course due to COVID-19 regulations.
- Atlanta and Martinsville will go from hosting one race to two. This is the first time Atlanta has hosted two races, while Martinsville will host two races for the first time since 1994.
- Bristol and Dover will go from having two races on the schedule to one as the Bristol race will be the paved event. (The Xfinity Series will not race on the Bristol dirt weekend.)
- The Darlington (spring) and Talladega (fall) races added during COVID-19 schedule changes will be kept.
- The fall Texas and Kansas weekends swapped spots, with Texas being the Round of 8 opener and Kansas being the middle race.

== Results and standings ==
=== Race results ===
No.	Race	Pole position	Most laps led	Winning driver	Manufacturer	No.	Winning team	Report
1	Beef. It's What's for Dinner. 300	Austin Cindric	Harrison Burton; Austin Cindric (Note: Burton and Cindric both led 28 laps.)	Austin Cindric	Ford	22	Team Penske	Report
2	Super Start Batteries 188	Brett Moffitt	Austin Cindric	Ty Gibbs	Toyota	54	Joe Gibbs Racing	Report
3	Contender Boats 250	Austin Cindric	Austin Cindric	Myatt Snider	Chevrolet	2	Richard Childress Racing	Report
4	Alsco Uniforms 300	Myatt Snider	Daniel Hemric	A. J. Allmendinger	Chevrolet	16	Kaulig Racing	Report
5	Call 811 Before You Dig 200	Daniel Hemric	Austin Cindric	Austin Cindric	Ford	22	Team Penske	Report
6	EchoPark 250	Austin Cindric	Martin Truex Jr.	Justin Allgaier	Chevrolet	7	JR Motorsports	Report
7	Cook Out 250	Harrison Burton	Josh Berry	Josh Berry	Chevrolet	8	JR Motorsports	Report
8	Ag-Pro 300	Austin Cindric	Austin Cindric	Jeb Burton	Chevrolet	10	Kaulig Racing	Report
9	Steakhouse Elite 200	A. J. Allmendinger	Noah Gragson	Justin Allgaier	Chevrolet	7	JR Motorsports	Report
10	Drydene 200	Daniel Hemric	Justin Allgaier	Austin Cindric	Ford	22	Team Penske	Report
11	Pit Boss 250	Kyle Busch	Kyle Busch	Kyle Busch	Toyota	54	Joe Gibbs Racing	Report
12	Alsco Uniforms 300	Riley Herbst	Daniel Hemric	Ty Gibbs	Toyota	54	Joe Gibbs Racing	Report
13	B&L Transport 170	Austin Cindric	Austin Cindric	A. J. Allmendinger	Chevrolet	16	Kaulig Racing	Report
14	Alsco Uniforms 250	A. J. Allmendinger	Kyle Busch	Kyle Busch	Toyota	54	Joe Gibbs Racing	Report
15	Tennessee Lottery 250	Kyle Busch	Kyle Busch	Kyle Busch	Toyota	54	Joe Gibbs Racing	Report
16	Pocono Green 225	Harrison Burton	Austin Cindric	Austin Cindric	Ford	22	Team Penske	Report
17	Henry 180	Ty Gibbs	A. J. Allmendinger	Kyle Busch	Toyota	54	Joe Gibbs Racing	Report
18	Credit Karma Money 250	Kyle Busch	Kyle Busch	Kyle Busch	Toyota	54	Joe Gibbs Racing	Report
19	Ambetter Get Vaccinated 200	Jeb Burton	Christopher Bell	Christopher Bell	Toyota	54	Joe Gibbs Racing	Report
20	Skrewball Peanut Butter Whiskey 200 at The Glen	Justin Allgaier	Ty Gibbs	Ty Gibbs	Toyota	54	Joe Gibbs Racing	Report
21	Pennzoil 150	A. J. Allmendinger	Austin Cindric	Austin Cindric	Ford	22	Team Penske	Report
22	New Holland 250	Austin Cindric	A. J. Allmendinger	A. J. Allmendinger	Chevrolet	16	Kaulig Racing	Report
23	Wawa 250	A. J. Allmendinger	A. J. Allmendinger	Justin Haley	Chevrolet	11	Kaulig Racing	Report
24	Sport Clips Haircuts VFW 200	Daniel Hemric	Denny Hamlin	Noah Gragson	Chevrolet	9	JR Motorsports	Report
25	Go Bowling 250	Austin Cindric	Ty Gibbs	Noah Gragson	Chevrolet	9	JR Motorsports	Report
26	Food City 300	Noah Gragson	Justin Allgaier	A. J. Allmendinger	Chevrolet	16	Kaulig Racing	Report
NASCAR Xfinity Series Playoffs
Round of 12
27	Alsco Uniforms 302	Austin Cindric	Justin Allgaier	Josh Berry	Chevrolet	1	JR Motorsports	Report
28	Sparks 300	Justin Allgaier	Riley Herbst	Brandon Brown	Chevrolet	68	Brandonbilt Motorsports	Report
29	Drive for the Cure 250	Austin Cindric	Austin Cindric	A. J. Allmendinger	Chevrolet	16	Kaulig Racing	Report
Round of 8
30	Andy's Frozen Custard 335	A. J. Allmendinger	John Hunter Nemechek	John Hunter Nemechek	Toyota	54	Joe Gibbs Racing	Report
31	Kansas Lottery 300	Daniel Hemric	Austin Cindric	Ty Gibbs	Toyota	54	Joe Gibbs Racing	Report
32	Dead On Tools 250	Austin Cindric	Noah Gragson	Noah Gragson	Chevrolet	9	JR Motorsports	Report
Championship 4
33	NASCAR Xfinity Series Championship Race	Austin Cindric	Austin Cindric	Daniel Hemric	Toyota	18	Joe Gibbs Racing	Report

=== Drivers' championship ===
(key) Bold – Pole position awarded by time. Italics – Pole position set by competition-based formula. * – Most laps led. ^{1} – Stage 1 winner. ^{2} – Stage 2 winner ^{1–10} – Regular season top 10 finishers.
. – Eliminated after Round of 12 . – Eliminated after Round of 8

Pos	Driver	DAY	DAY	HOM	LVS	PHO	ATL	MAR	TAL	DAR	DOV	COA	CLT	MOH	TEX	NSH	POC	ROA	ATL	NHA	GLN	IND	MCH	DAY	DAR	RCH	BRI	LVS	TAL	CLT	TEX	KAN	MAR	PHO	Pts.	Stage	Bonus
1	Daniel Hemric	9	3	3	2*^{2}	23^{2}	9	3^{2}	12	5	9	29	28*^{12}	12	4	13	6	2	30	3	22	12	39	5	24^{1}	6	10^{2}	5	4	3^{12}	2	15	3	1^{2}	4040	–	16^{4}
2	Austin Cindric	**1***	2*^{1}	5*^{2}	4^{1}	1*^{1}	13	6	2*	30^{1}	1	5	2	14*	3^{1}	32^{1}	1*	8	10	4	3^{1}	1*	37^{1}	39	3	16	2	4	8	2*	5^{1}	2*^{2}	2^{1}	**2***^{1}	4035	–	44^{2}
3	Noah Gragson	32	28	33	5	39	4	2^{1}	6^{2}	4*	15	36	27	40	7	8	4	9	3	14	7	5	3	7	1^{2}	1	12	3	30	6	3	35	1*^{2}	12	4025	–	17^{7}
4	A. J. Allmendinger	5	35	14^{1}	1	5	5	13	3	13	4	2^{1}	33	1^{1}	6	5	5	4*^{12}	13	12	2^{2}	**2**^{2}	1*^{2}	2*	20	18^{1}	1	7^{1}	39	1	6	3^{1}	7	14	4023	–	50^{1}
NASCAR Xfinity Series Playoffs cut-off
Pos	Driver	DAY	DAY	HOM	LVS	PHO	ATL	MAR	TAL	DAR	DOV	COA	CLT	MOH	TEX	NSH	POC	ROA	ATL	NHA	GLN	IND	MCH	DAY	DAR	RCH	BRI	LVS	TAL	CLT	TEX	KAN	MAR	PHO	Pts.	Stage	Bonus
5	Justin Allgaier	28	26	38	14	8	1	9	29	1	3*^{1}	3	11	35	2	2	3	12	7	2	4	11	6	3	6	4	4*^{1}	2*^{2}	3	9	4	9	5	9	2300	41	21^{3}
6	Justin Haley	29	9	6	8	26	8	8	8^{1}	14		9^{2}	19	2^{2}	9	19	38	10	4	6	9	3^{1}	17	1^{1}	4	2	6	9	6	4	7	4	33	5	2244	19	15^{6}
7	Brandon Jones	38^{1}	4	2	3	33	37	5	37	3	35	17	8	4	5	6	7	19	39	38	6	36	2	40	33	20	5	6	2	5	10	11	6	7	2239	8	3^{9}
8	Harrison Burton	3*	6	39	9	12	3	7	10	11^{2}	6	6	3	38	30	3	37^{1}	5	24	5	5	9	5	9	2	9	7	10	25	15	8	34	20	3	2194	20	8^{5}
9	Myatt Snider	7	13	1	32	11	11	15	9	19	16	21	26	29	33	31	10	23	21	7	15	7	36	8	9	25	8	15	31	8	21	10	13	19	2172	25	5
10	Jeb Burton	4	5	4	10	6	25	11	1	20	11	10	9	16	32	7	8	14	2	11	8	23	29	4^{2}	5	10	24	36	7	13	11	12	37	23	2162	32	9^{8}
11	Riley Herbst	26	39	11	40	4	6	29	4	28	17	16	**12**	21	12	10	35	7	19	10	13	8	7	10	38	5	3	33	27*	34	12	13	10	4	2157	30	1^{10}
12	Jeremy Clements	22	10	9	17	10	12	14	14	6	12	23	10	33	14	11	13	28	8	15	16	14	11	24	8	26	13	39	24	12	29	17	9	18	2126	12	–
13	Ty Gibbs **(R)**		1^{2}			2		4		18	5		1	3			2^{2}	**33**			1*	19	13			7*^{2}	11	11		21		1	27		663	167	23
14	Ryan Sieg	31	27	8	38	37	10	23	5	9	8	25	31	9	11	16	17	22	12	13	18	32	12	16	11	13	34	17	11	32	14	5	31	17	643	36	–
15	Michael Annett	36	15	13	6	38	7	10	32	7	7	11	24	7	10	12	12	3			11	QL		30	14	22				27	9	7	38	11	638	95	–
16	Brandon Brown	6	8	34	11	3	33	27	7	24	10	26	4	6	13	35	15	11	31	17	12	34	40	34	28	8	14	22	1	22	33	14	36	20	620	30	5
17	Josh Berry **(R)**	27		10	7	36	38	1*	31	2	2^{2}		32	8	19	4	9		23	8			4			24	35	1	9				28		540	75	11
18	Josh Williams	21	17	26	16	21	16	16	28	39	38	DNQ	21	10	17	21	40	17	18	22	14	15	18	17	15	23	20	24	14	11	19	26	11	32	531	1	–
19	Alex Labbé	40	22	15	35	32	17	31	21	10	19	20	14	11	18	17	16	21	15	36	39	13	31	31	10	19	19	38	21	14	24	33	8	30	503	12	–
20	Tommy Joe Martins	24	24	18	15	17	18	34	11	15	20	35	29	39	21	20	20	15	16	21	19	21	19	18	37	37	23	14	18	33	18	23	40	24	497	24	–
21	Brett Moffitt	2^{2‡}	11^{‡}	7^{‡}	34^{‡}	9^{‡}	40^{‡}	12^{‡}	17	8	13	12	25	31	8	23	11	31	6	9	26	31	8	11	QL		40	12	26	37	16	6	19	8	495	37	–
22	Landon Cassill	23	12	19	21	22	14	37	20	12	25	22	13	20	15	29	21	27	38	25	20	17	26	21	16	39	39	16	37	17	36	19	12	DNQ	465	1	–
23	Jade Buford **(R)**		36	20	30	20	26	19	18	35	33	15	17	13	16	33	19	34	17	18	21	20	9	28	21	36	27	26	12	16	39	38	17	33	435	8	–
24	Kyle Weatherman	15	16	25	33	34	28	25	23	33	22	DNQ	DNQ	26	37	28	26	DNQ	32	19	34	16	24	32	34	15	29	18	20	23	25	21	34	26	341	3	–
25	Sam Mayer **(R)**																18	35	9	39	10	27	33	12	39	12	9	34	38	10	13	8	4	13	338	27	–
26	Jeffrey Earnhardt	37	30	22	19	19	19	36	22	31	18	DNQ	22	34	36	DNQ	22	DNQ	22	26	25		23	20	26	30	25	29	29	20	23	28	22	36	325	2	–
27	Ryan Vargas **(R)**	18	37	24	23	30	31	40	30	27	26		16	18	24	18	39		14	29			21	27	25	35	37	19	33	36	22	22	32	28	301	–	–
28	Joe Graf Jr.	11	20	27	18	25	29	38	33	37	29		DNQ	30	31	34	32		25	24	30		38	35	19	31	17	40	10	28	26	29	15	35	286	–	–
29	Matt Mills	16	19	29	39	35	34	33	25	40	27		35	23	26	25	23		26	32	38		14	33	23	21	36	28	23	30	32	25	29	29	271	–	–
30	J. J. Yeley			12		13		24		22	14					22				23		22		13		29		37	16	19	40		16	22	267	14	–
31	David Starr		38	21	29	28	27	22	16	17	40		DNQ	36	20	24	33		40	20	DNQ		22	14	30	28	30	21	40		34	36	24	21	265	–	–
32	Colby Howard	35	23	36	20	16	21	39	19	29	28	28	30	22	28	DNQ	24	DNQ	20	30	31		25	26	27										225	2	–
33	Jesse Little	17	14	32	26	40	22	32	26	32	37	DNQ	18	24	29	27	29		28	28	27		32		32		28				31	30			215	–	–
34	Gray Gaulding	34	21	28	27	27	36	21	34	38	31	27	DNQ	17	38	DNQ		DNQ	35			DNQ	27		40		18			40		39			140	–	–
35	Andy Lally		31		DNQ	DNQ	DNQ	DNQ	DNQ	DNQ	DNQ	18		5				13				10													127	19	–
36	Preston Pardus		33									14		25				16			23	35								7			18		127	2	–
37	Santino Ferrucci			30	13	15	15										14		33										17						122	–	–
38	Stefan Parsons	13		31	36	18		20					23		35	36											22			24				34	119	4	–
39	Mason Massey						32		27								30		29	40			30	25	18	17		23	35		27	37			116	–	–
40	Blaine Perkins					24	30	35									34							23				20	13^{2}					16	113	12	–
41	Brandon Gdovic	8						17		36					23					16							21								101	–	–
42	Cody Ware	39^{†}	25				23				23		20	15				24																	92	–	–
43	Colin Garrett								15														20	37	17								14		83	–	–
44	Ryan Ellis									16		24		28				30							35								23	DNQ	67	1	–
45	Sage Karam																					26					16			25				25	62	6	–
46	Garrett Smithley				24										25														19			18			62	–	–
47	Jason White	10							39															15					28						59	–	–
48	Chad Finchum	30		23	28		39						15			DNQ				DNQ					DNQ		33								57	–	–
49	Dexter Bean			17	25	29	35													27															52	–	–
50	Matt Jaskol							28		34	39			19	27			DNQ				DNQ						27							51	–	–
51	Stephen Leicht		29									DNQ						26			28	DNQ				38							21	DNQ	45	–	–
52	Miguel Paludo		7									34		27																					44	1	–
53	Natalie Decker		40						24							26		32															25		42	–	–
54	Caesar Bacarella	12							38			DNQ											35	36					32						37	3	–
55	Carson Ware																28		36				28		31		32	31							36	–	–
56	Dylan Lupton																											35			38	27		15	33	–	–
57	Joey Gase								36								36												15		30	40		DNQ	32	–	–
58	Spencer Pumpelly											19						36				24													32	–	–
59	Ronnie Bassett Jr.	DNQ	DNQ	DNQ			DNQ	DNQ	DNQ	DNQ	DNQ				22				27																25	–	–
60	Patrick Emerling																			31						32						24			25	1	–
61	Dale Earnhardt Jr.																									14									23	–	–
62	Loris Hezemans					31											27					DNQ								35		32			23	–	–
63	George Gorham Jr.							18																											21	2	–
64	Tanner Berryhill									21					39																37				18	–	–
65	Kyle Sieg										34																							27	13	–	–
66	C. J. McLaughlin																		37^{±}	37						40		32	34		35				13	–	–
67	Robby Lyons	25																																	12	–	–
68	Boris Said											31						DNQ																	6	–	–
69	Dave Smith																				33														4	–	–
70	Michael Munley																				35														2	–	–
71	Josh Bilicki																	29^{¶}			24^{¶}	25^{¶}								38					1	–	–
72	Mike Harmon																																39		1	–	–
	Mike Skeen																					DNQ													0	–	–
	Dillon Bassett				DNQ	DNQ							DNQ	DNQ	DNQ	DNQ								DNQ											0	–	–
	Chris Cockrum	DNQ																																	0	–	–
	Mario Gosselin	DNQ																																	0	–	–
	Giorgio Maggi																					DNQ													0	–	–
Ineligible for Xfinity Series driver points
Pos	Driver	DAY	DAY	HOM	LVS	PHO	ATL	MAR	TAL	DAR	DOV	COA	CLT	MOH	TEX	NSH	POC	ROA	ATL	NHA	GLN	IND	MCH	DAY	DAR	RCH	BRI	LVS	TAL	CLT	TEX	KAN	MAR	PHO	Pts.	Stage	Bonus
	Kyle Busch											**1***			1*^{2}	**1***^{2}		1	1*^{12}																		
	John Hunter Nemechek										32															3			22^{1}		1*^{2}			6			
	Christopher Bell																			1*^{12}				6													
	Martin Truex Jr.						2*^{12}																														
	Kevin Harvick											4						6				33															
	Chase Elliott																					4															
	Ty Dillon	14		37	31				35				7						5						13	11	15	8		26							
	Tyler Reddick	DNQ		40	12							8	5			15							16		7												
	Jordan Anderson	DNQ	DNQ	DNQ	DNQ	DNQ	DNQ	DNQ	DNQ	DNQ	DNQ				34					36			15	22					5			20					
	Austin Dillon											13							11		37	6			29												
	Chase Briscoe												6											19													
	Bayley Currey	33	32	35	22	7	24	26	40	24	24	DNQ	DNQ	37	40	30		DNQ	34		32	DNQ	34			27	38	13	36		17	16	35	31			
	Cole Custer											7																									
	Austin Hill															9	25					29								18	20						
	Bubba Wallace																						10														
	Sheldon Creed																																	10			
	Denny Hamlin																								12*												
	Timmy Hill	20	34	16	37	14	20	30	13	25	30	33	34	DNQ	DNQ	DNQ	DNQ	20	DNQ		29		DNQ	DNQ	36	DNQ	DNQ	DNQ	DNQ	DNQ	DNQ	DNQ	DNQ	DNQ			
	Will Rodgers															14						28								29							
	Kaz Grala																	18													15						
	Kris Wright		18									32		32				25			17	30								39							
	James Davison																					18															
	Danny Bohn	19																																			
	B. J. McLeod									26	21		DNQ												22		26	30									
	Spencer Boyd																			33				38		33	31	25		31	28	31	30	DNQ			
	Akinori Ogata																									34							26				
	Tim Viens																							29													
	Ross Chastain											30																									
	Jesse Iwuji																31																				
	Dawson Cram																			35																	
	Zane Smith										36																										
	Grant Enfinger												36																								
	Erik Jones																				36																
	Kyle Tilley																				40																
	Ryan Eversley																					DNQ															
Pos	Driver	DAY	DAY	HOM	LVS	PHO	ATL	MAR	TAL	DAR	DOV	COA	CLT	MOH	TEX	NSH	POC	ROA	ATL	NHA	GLN	IND	MCH	DAY	DAR	RCH	BRI	LVS	TAL	CLT	TEX	KAN	MAR	PHO	Pts.	Stage	Bonus
^{†} – Cody Ware started receiving points at the Daytona Road Course.^{‡} – Brett Moffitt started receiving points at Talladega in April.^{±} – C. J. McLaughlin was replaced by David Starr during the race due to the former suffering from heat exhaustion. Since McLaughlin started the race, he is officially credited with 37th place.^{¶} – Josh Bilicki started receiving points at the Charlotte Roval in October.

=== Owners' championship (Top 15) ===
(key) Bold – Pole position awarded by time. Italics – Pole position set by competition-based formula. * – Most laps led. ^{1} – Stage 1 winner. ^{2} – Stage 2 winner ^{1–10} – Regular season top 10 finishers.
. – Eliminated after Round of 12 . – Eliminated after Round of 8

Pos.	No.	Car Owner	DAY	DAY	HOM	LVS	PHO	ATL	MAR	TAL	DAR	DOV	COA	CLT	MOH	TEX	NSH	POC	ROA	ATL	NHA	GLN	IND	MCH	DAY	DAR	RCH	BRI	LVS	TAL	CLT	TEX	KAN	MAR	PHO	Points	Bonus
1	22	Roger Penske	**1***	2*^{1}	5*^{2}	4^{1}	1*^{1}	13	6	2*	30^{1}	1	5	2	14*	3^{1}	32^{1}	1*	8	10	4	3^{1}	1*	37^{1}	39	3	16	2	4	8	2*	5^{1}	2*^{2}	2^{1}	**2***^{1}	4035	42^{3}
2	54	Coy Gibbs	14	1^{2}	37	31	2	2*^{12}	4	35	18	5	**1***	1	3	1*^{2}	**1***^{2}	2^{2}	1	1*^{12}	1*^{12}	1*	19	13	6	12*	7*^{2}	11	11	22^{1}	21	1*^{2}	1	27	6	4031	29^{2}
3	9	Rick Hendrick	32	28	33	5	39	4	2^{1}	6^{2}	4*	15	36	27	40	7	8	4	9	3	14	7	5	3	7	1^{2}	1	12	3	30	6	3	35	1*^{2}	12	4025	16^{8}
4	16	Matt Kaulig	5	35	14^{1}	1	5	5	13	3	13	4	2^{1}	33	1^{1}	6	5	5	4*^{12}	13	12	2^{2}	**2**^{2}	1*^{2}	2*	20	18^{1}	1	7^{1}	39	1	6	3^{1}	7	14	4023	50^{1}
NASCAR Xfinity Series Playoffs cut-off
5	18	Coy Gibbs	9	3	3	2*^{2}	23^{2}	9	3^{2}	12	5	9	29	28*^{12}	12	4	13	6	2	30	3	22	12	39	5	24^{1}	6	10^{2}	5	4	3^{12}	2	15	3	1^{2}	2340	15^{5}
6	7	Kelley Earnhardt Miller	28	26	38	14	8	1	9	29	1	3*^{1}	3	11	35	2	2	3	12	7	2	4	11	6	3	6	4	4*^{1}	2*^{2}	3	9	4	9	5	9	2299	20^{4}
7	11	Matt Kaulig	29	9	6	8	26	8	8	8^{1}	14	36	9^{2}	19	2^{2}	9	19	38	10	4	6	9	3^{1}	17	1^{1}	4	2	6	9	6	4	7	4	33	5	2243	14^{7}
8	1	L. W. Miller	36	15	13	6	38	7	10	32	7	7	11	24	7	10	12	12	3	11	8	11	4	4	30	14	22	35	1	9	27	9	7	38	11	2195	6^{10}
9	20	Joe Gibbs	3*	6	39	9	12	3	7	10	11^{2}	6	6	3	38	30	3	37^{1}	5	24	5	5	9	5	9	2	9	7	10	25	15	8	34	20	3	2193	7^{6}
10	2	Richard Childress	7	13	1	32	11	11	15	9	19	16	21	26	29	33	31	10	23	21	7	15	7	36	8	9	25	8	15	31	8	21	10	13	19	2172	5
11	10	Matt Kaulig	4	5	4	10	6	25	11	1	20	11	10	9	16	32	7	8	14	2	11	8	23	29	4^{2}	5	10	24	36	7	13	11	12	37	23	2161	8^{9}
12	8	Dale Earnhardt Jr.	27	7	10	7	36	38	1*	31	2	2^{2}	34	32	27	19	4	18	35	9	39	10	27	33	12	39	14	9	34	38	10	13	8	4	13	2158	6
13	19	Joe Gibbs	38^{1}	4	2	3	33	37	5	37	3	35	17	8	4	5	6	7	19	39	38	6	36	2	40	33	20	5	6	2	5	10	11	6	7	865	1
14	98	Gene Haas	26	39	11	40	4	6	29	4	28	17	16	**12**	21	12	10	35	7	19	10	13	8	7	10	38	5	3	33	27*	34	12	13	10	4	780	–
15	51	Jeremy Clements	22	10	9	17	10	12	14	14	6	12	23	10	33	14	11	13	28	8	15	16	14	11	24	8	26	13	39	24	12	29	17	9	18	748	–
Pos.	No.	Car Owner	DAY	DAY	HOM	LVS	PHO	ATL	MAR	TAL	DAR	DOV	COA	CLT	MOH	TEX	NSH	POC	ROA	ATL	NHA	GLN	IND	MCH	DAY	DAR	RCH	BRI	LVS	TAL	CLT	TEX	KAN	MAR	PHO	Points	Bonus

NOTE: The No. 54 Joe Gibbs Racing Toyota used an ineligible driver in selected races and could not acquire bonus points for those races.

=== Manufacturers' Championship ===
Pos	Manufacturer	Wins	Points
1	Chevrolet	16	1220
2	Toyota	12	1181
3	Ford	5	1100

== See also ==
- 2021 NASCAR Cup Series
- 2021 NASCAR Camping World Truck Series
- 2021 ARCA Menards Series
- 2021 ARCA Menards Series East
- 2021 ARCA Menards Series West
- 2021 NASCAR Whelen Modified Tour
- 2021 NASCAR Pinty's Series
- 2021 NASCAR PEAK Mexico Series
- 2021 NASCAR Whelen Euro Series
- 2021 eNASCAR iRacing Pro Invitational Series
- 2021 SRX Series
- 2021 Southern Modified Auto Racing Teams season
