= Jason Ratcliff =

American NASCAR crew chief (born 1967)

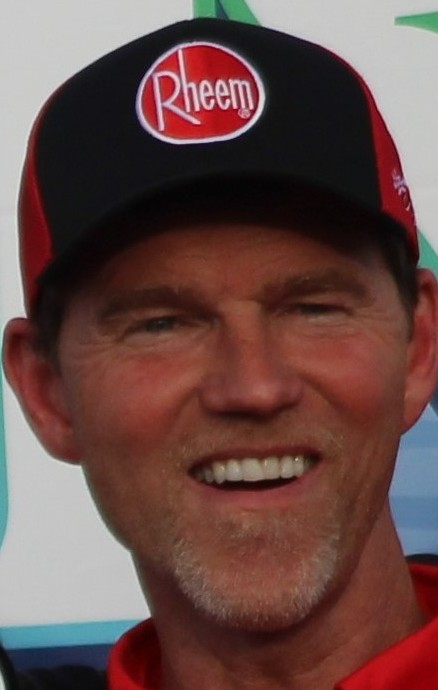
- Ratcliff at New Hampshire Motor Speedway in 2018

Personal information
- Nationality: (United States) American
- Born: Jason Mederic Ratcliff; December 8, 1967 (age 58) Sumter, South Carolina, U.S.

Sport
- Country: United States
- Sport: NASCAR Xfinity Series
- Team: 54. Joe Gibbs Racing

Jason Mederic Ratcliff (born December 8, 1967) is an American NASCAR crew chief, who is employed by Joe Gibbs Racing as the crew chief for their No. 54 Toyota Supra in the NASCAR Xfinity Series, driven by Taylor Gray. He has worked for JGR since 2005 and prior to that was a crew chief for Brewco Motorsports and a pit crew member with LAR Motorsports and Sadler Brothers Racing. He is the 2009 NASCAR Nationwide Series championship-winning crew chief, winning the championship with driver Kyle Busch.

== Career ==
=== Early career ===
==== Crew member ====
Ratcliff began his career in racing working on mini Sprint Cars in Texas, before he was hired for his first job in NASCAR in 1995, Sadler Brothers Racing, based in Nashville, Tennessee. While at SBR, he was a mechanic and rear tire changer for drivers Chuck Bown and Gary Bradberry in the Busch Series. He worked there for only two years before joining at Columbia, Tennessee-based LAR Motorsports as a chief mechanic for Casey Atwood and Jeff Purvis during the 1997 and 1998 seasons.

==== 1999–2004: Brewco Motorsports ====
In 1999, Ratcliff got his first crew chiefing job. He moved from LAR to Brewco Motorsports to become the crew chief for rookie Casey Atwood. After working as the crew chief for him two years, Atwood moved to the Cup Series with Evernham Motorsports, and was replaced by Jamie McMurray, who became Ratcliff's new driver. During the 2003 and 2004 seasons, he became the crew chief for David Green. While together they won three races, achieved 11 top-fives, 21 top-10s and two pole positions, which resulted in a second place in the final standings, 14 points behind Brian Vickers. By the end of their relationship, they scored seven wins and seven pole positions.

=== 2005–present: Joe Gibbs Racing ===
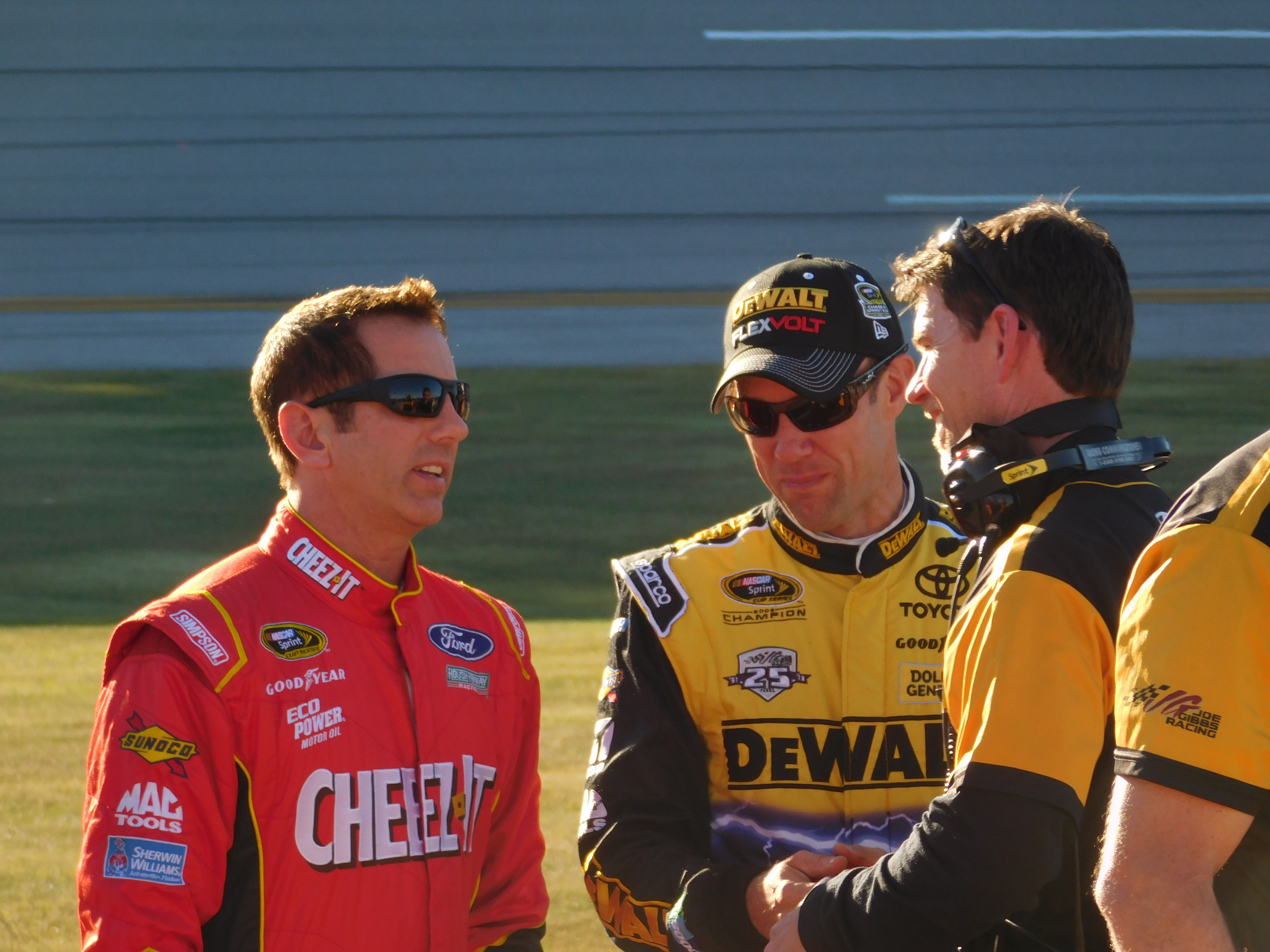
Ratcliff (right) talking to his driver Matt Kenseth as well as Greg Biffle at Talladega in October 2016

In 2005, Ratcliff moved to Joe Gibbs Racing as the crew chief for J. J. Yeley. He remained the crew chief for Yeley until 2006. During the two years, Ratcliff was able to achieve 13 top-fives and 34 top-ten finishes. During the next season, Ratcliff was the crew chief for three different drivers: Aric Almirola, Brad Coleman and Kevin Conway, in which they earned two poles, four top-fives and five top-tens.

In 2008, Ratcliff was the crew chief for Kyle Busch and Denny Hamlin, which were both drivers of the No. 18. He was able to win five races total during the season, four with Busch and one with Hamlin. During 2009, Kyle Busch became the full-time driver of the 18. Ratcliff and Busch won the championship, with nine wins, 11 runner-up finishes, 25 top-fives and 2,698 laps led. With their teamwork, Busch was able to lead in all the races except for three. They also led more than 50 percent of the laps in a race an twelve times. Busch led the series points standings after 30 of the 35 events, including the last 29 weeks of the season, leaving little room for doubt in the championship chase.

After seven years being the crew chief for the No. 18 Nationwide Series car, Ratcliff was announced to replace Greg Zipadelli as the crew chief of the No. 20 Joe Gibbs Racing Sprint Cup Series car, driven by Joey Logano, on December 16, 2011. In 2013, Ratcliff served as crew chief for Matt Kenseth, but was suspended for one race after the No. 20 engine failed postrace inspection following Kenseth's victory in the STP 400.

On September 24, 2019, after two successful Xfinity Series seasons, Ratcliff and driver Christopher Bell were announced to move to the Leavine Family Racing No. 95 Toyota for the 2020 Cup season. LFR closed down at the end of the 2020 season, so in 2021, Ratcliff returned to his former job as crew chief of the No. 20 Xfinity Series team for JGR, now driven by Harrison Burton.

On October 27, 2023, Ratcliff announced in an interview on SiriusXM NASCAR Radio that he would be retiring as a crew chief after the 2023 season. He crew chiefed the No. 19 car for Joe Gibbs Racing in 2023. He spent the majority of his 24-year career in NASCAR with JGR crew chiefing in the Cup and Xfinity Series and became the winningest crew chief in Xfinity Series history. He also crew chiefed for Brewco Motorsports in the Xfinity Series early in his career. Seth Chavka replaced him for the 2024 season on the 19 car.

On December 2, 2024, Ratcliff was announced to be returning to the 54 car, driven by Taylor Gray, for the 2025 season.

== Personal life ==
Ratcliff moved six times throughout his childhood, starting in Sumter, South Carolina, where he was born, and ending in Westlake, Louisiana, where he graduated from Westlake High School and began his racing career working on mini Sprint Cars. After high school, he moved again to Texas, where he continued to work on mini Sprint Cars for the next nine years before his first job in NASCAR in 1995. The first two NASCAR teams he worked for were based in Tennessee, so he moved there from Texas. Ratcliff currently lives in Huntersville, North Carolina (in the Charlotte metropolitan area where most NASCAR teams are based) with his wife, Christi, and two children, Cade and Dakota.
