= NASCAR O'Reilly Auto Parts Series at Nashville Superspeedway =

NASCAR O'Reilly Auto Parts Series race at Nashville Superspeedway

NASCAR O'Reilly Auto Parts Series
- Venue: Nashville Superspeedway
- Location: Lebanon, Tennessee, United States

Circuit information
- Surface: Concrete
- Length: 1.330 mi (2.140 km)
- Turns: 4

Stock car racing events in the NASCAR O'Reilly Auto Parts Series have been held at the Nashville Superspeedway. The track held 2 races annually from 2002 to 2011, when the track was removed from the 2012 NASCAR Nationwide Series schedule. The track returned to the schedule following the release of the 2021 NASCAR Xfinity Series schedule.

== Current date ==
Sports Illustrated Resorts 250
- Corporate sponsor: Sports Illustrated Resorts
- First race: 2001
- Distance: 250 miles (400 km)
- Laps: 188; Stage 1: 45; Stage 2: 50; Final stage: 93
- Previous names: Pepsi 300 Presented by Mapco/Williams (2001); Pepsi 300 Presented by Kroger (2002); Pepsi 300 (2003–2008); Nashville 300 (2009–2011); Tennessee Lottery 250 (2021–2025)

The Sports Illustrated Resorts 250 is a NASCAR O'Reilly Auto Parts Series race at Nashville Superspeedway. Traditionally held on Holy Saturday from 2001 to 2011, the race was removed when Dover Motorsports ceased operations of this track and Gateway International Raceway. It was reinstated in 2021 when Dover Motorsports took the second date away from Dover International Speedway and realigned it to reopening the Nashville Superspeedway, with the date moved to the Cup weekend in June.

=== Past winners ===
Year	Date	No.	Driver	Team	Manufacturer	Race Distance		Race Time	Average Speed (mph)	Report	Ref
Year	Date	No.	Driver	Team	Manufacturer	Laps	Miles (km)	Race Time	Average Speed (mph)	Report	Ref
2001	April 14	60	Greg Biffle	Roush Racing	Ford	225	299.925 (482.682)	2:50:08	105.773	Report	
2002	April 13	10	Scott Riggs	ppc Racing	Ford	225	299.925 (482.682)	2:42:04	111.038	Report	
2003	April 12	37	David Green	Brewco Motorsports	Pontiac	225	299.925 (482.682)	2:26:38	122.724	Report	
2004	April 10	99	Michael Waltrip	Michael Waltrip Racing	Chevrolet	225	299.925 (482.682)	2:27:15	122.211	Report	
2005	March 26	41	Reed Sorenson	Chip Ganassi Racing	Dodge	225	299.925 (482.682)	2:24:37	124.436	Report	
2006	April 15	21	Kevin Harvick	Richard Childress Racing	Chevrolet	225	299.925 (482.682)	2:40:56	111.82	Report	
2007	April 7	60	Carl Edwards	Roush Fenway Racing	Ford	225	299.925 (482.682)	2:20:32	128.051	Report	
2008	March 22	29	Scott Wimmer	Richard Childress Racing	Chevrolet	225	299.925 (482.682)	2:14:12	134.095	Report	
2009	April 11	20	Joey Logano	Joe Gibbs Racing	Toyota	225	299.925 (482.682)	2:32:19	118.145	Report	
2010	April 3	33	Kevin Harvick	Kevin Harvick Inc.	Chevrolet	225	299.925 (482.682)	2:37:49	114.028	Report	
2011	April 23	60	Carl Edwards	Roush Fenway Racing	Ford	225	299.925 (482.682)	2:23:32	125.375	Report	
2012 – 2020	Not held										
2021	June 19	54	Kyle Busch	Joe Gibbs Racing	Toyota	189*	251.37 (404.54)	2:20:48	107.118	Report	
2022	June 25	7	Justin Allgaier	JR Motorsports	Chevrolet	188	250 (402.335)	2:05:44	119.319	Report	
2023	June 24	10	A. J. Allmendinger	Kaulig Racing	Chevrolet	196*	260.68 (419.522)	2:40:21	97.542	Report	
2024	June 29	20	John Hunter Nemechek	Joe Gibbs Racing	Toyota	188	250 (402.335)	1:57:36	127.571	Report	
2025	May 31	7	Justin Allgaier	JR Motorsports	Chevrolet	188	250 (402.335)	2:15:09	111.006	Report	
2026	May 30	7	Justin Allgaier	JR Motorsports	Chevrolet	188	250 (402.335)	1:53:16	132.452	Report	
2027	June 5									Report	

- 2021 and 2023: Race extended due to NASCAR overtime.

==== Multiple winners (drivers) ====
# Wins	Driver	Years won
3	Justin Allgaier	2022, 2025, 2026
2	Carl Edwards	2007, 2011
2	Kevin Harvick	2006, 2010

==== Multiple winners (teams) ====
# Wins	Team	Years won
3	Roush Fenway Racing	2001, 2007, 2011
3	Joe Gibbs Racing	2009, 2021, 2024
3	JR Motorsports	2022, 2025, 2026
2	Richard Childress Racing	2006, 2008

==== Manufacturer wins ====
# Wins	Make	Years won
8	(United States) Chevrolet	2004, 2006, 2008, 2010, 2022, 2023, 2025, 2026
4	(United States) Ford	2001, 2002, 2007, 2011
3	(Japan) Toyota	2009, 2021, 2024
1	(United States) Dodge	2005
1	(United States) Pontiac	2003

== Former second race ==
Federated Auto Parts 300
- Corporate sponsor: Federated Auto Parts
- First race: 2002
- Last race: 2011
- Distance: 299.925 miles (482.682 km)
- Laps: 225
- Previous names: Inside Traxx 300 Presented by Met-Rx (2002); Trace Adkins Chrome 300 (2003); Federated Auto Parts 300 (2004–2011)

The Federated Auto Parts 300 was a NASCAR Nationwide Series race that took place at Nashville Superspeedway. The race was one of two races held at the track, which received a second date on the then-Busch Series schedule one year after the track opened. Traditionally run in early June since its 2002 inception, the race moved to late July in 2011 as part of a schedule realignment.

=== Past winners ===
Year	Date	No.	Driver	Team	Manufacturer	Race Distance		Race Time	Average Speed (mph)	Report	Ref
Year	Date	No.	Driver	Team	Manufacturer	Laps	Miles (km)	Race Time	Average Speed (mph)	Report	Ref
2002	June 8	24	Jack Sprague	Hendrick Motorsports	Chevrolet	225	299.925 (482.682)	2:23:41	125.244	Report	
2003	June 7	10	Scott Riggs	ppc Racing	Ford	225	299.925 (482.682)	2:31:48	118.547	Report	
2004	June 12	00	Jason Leffler	Haas CNC Racing	Chevrolet	225	299.925 (482.682)	2:36:53	114.708	Report	
2005	June 12*	2	Clint Bowyer	Richard Childress Racing	Chevrolet	225	299.925 (482.682)	2:27:20	122.141	Report	
2006	June 10	60	Carl Edwards	Roush Racing	Ford	225	299.925 (482.682)	2:25:42	123.511	Report	
2007	June 9	60	Carl Edwards	Roush Fenway Racing	Ford	225	299.925 (482.682)	2:18:28	129.949	Report	
2008	June 7	88	Brad Keselowski	JR Motorsports	Chevrolet	225	299.925 (482.682)	2:32:58	117.643	Report	
2009	June 6	18	Kyle Busch	Joe Gibbs Racing	Toyota	225	299.925 (482.682)	2:18:46	129.682	Report	
2010	June 5	22	Brad Keselowski	Penske Racing	Dodge	225	299.925 (482.682)	2:30:46	119.36	Report	
2011	July 23	60	Carl Edwards	Roush Fenway Racing	Ford	225	299.925 (482.682)	2:14:17	134.011	Report	

- 2005: Race postponed from Saturday to Sunday due to rain.

==== Multiple winners (drivers) ====
# Wins	Driver	Years won
3	Carl Edwards	2006, 2007, 2011
2	Brad Keselowski	2008, 2010

==== Multiple winners (teams) ====
# Wins	Team	Years won
3	Roush Fenway Racing	2006, 2007, 2011

==== Manufacturer wins ====
# Wins	Make	Years won
4	(United States) Chevrolet	2002, 2004. 2005, 2008
4	(United States) Ford	2003, 2006, 2007, 2011
1	(United States) Dodge	2010
1	(Japan) Toyota	2009

== See also ==
- Cracker Barrel 400 – Current Cup Series race at the track.
- Allegiance 200 – Current Truck Series race at the track

Previous race: Charbroil 300	NASCAR O'Reilly Auto Parts Series; Sports Illustrated Resorts 250	Next race: MillerTech Battery 250
