= NASCAR O'Reilly Auto Parts Series at Circuit of the Americas =

Focused Health 250

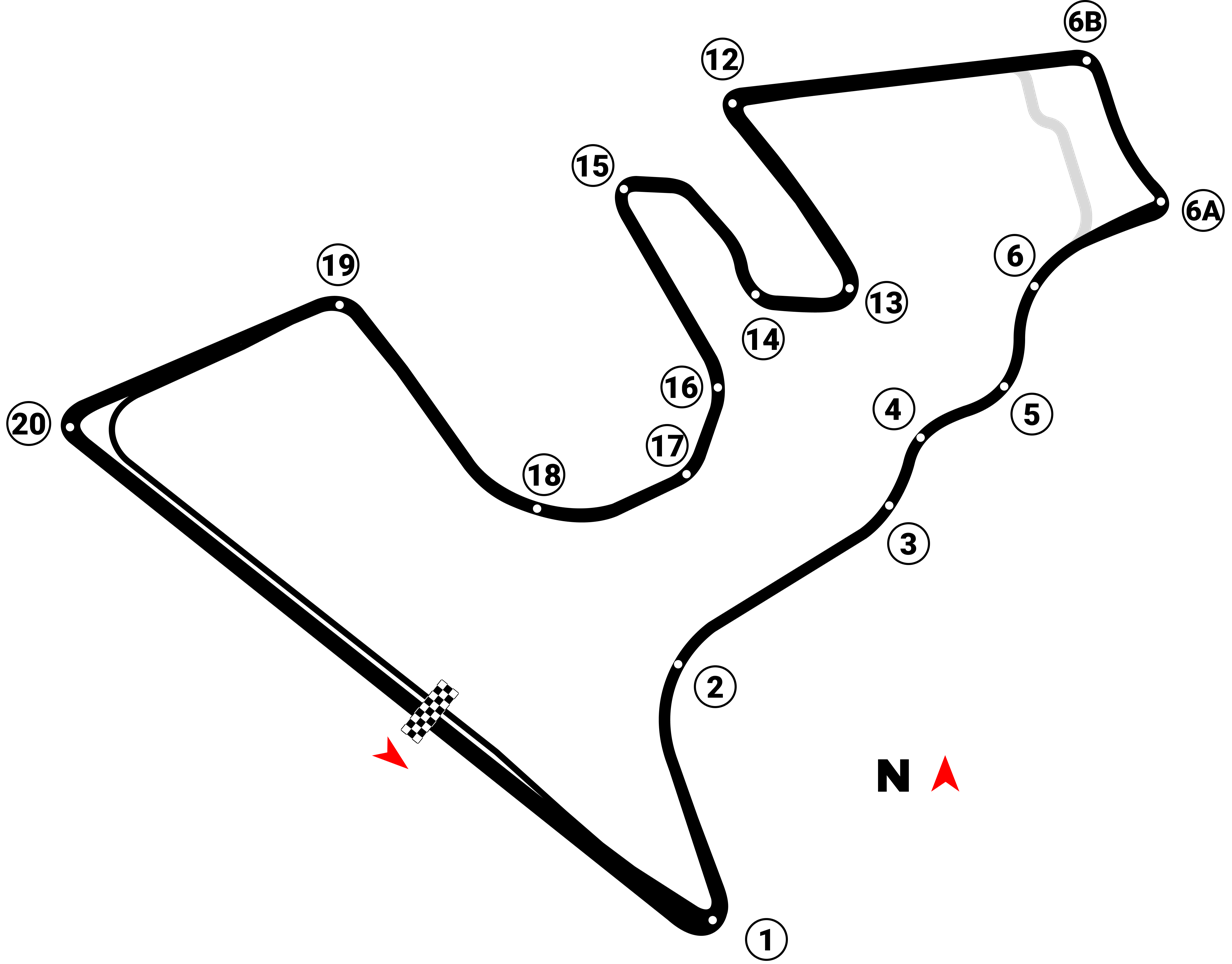

NASCAR O'Reilly Auto Parts Series
- Venue: Circuit of the Americas
- Location: Austin, Texas
- Corporate sponsor: Focused Health
- First race: 2021
- Distance: 156 mi (251 km)
- Laps: 65; First 2 stages: 20 each Stage 3: 25
- Previous names: Pit Boss 250 (2021–2023)
- Most wins (driver): A. J. Allmendinger (2)
- Most wins (team): Kaulig Racing, JR Motorsports (2)
- Most wins (manufacturer): Chevrolet (5)

Circuit information
- Surface: Asphalt
- Length: 2.400 mi (3.862 km)
- Turns: 18

Stock car races in the NASCAR O'Reilly Auto Parts Series has been held at Circuit of the Americas in Austin, Texas as a companion to the Cup race at the track since 2021. The 250 kilometres (160 mi) race is currently known as Focused Health 250 for sponsorship reasons. Shane van Gisbergen is the defending winner.

== Past winners ==
The configuration of the Grand Prix Circuit, used from 2021 to 2024.

Year	Date	No.	Driver	Team	Manufacturer	Race distance		Race time	Average speed (mph)	Report	Ref
Year	Date	No.	Driver	Team	Manufacturer	Laps	Miles (km)	Race time	Average speed (mph)	Report	Ref
Grand Prix Layout: 3.426 miles (5.514 km.)
2021	May 22	54	Kyle Busch	Joe Gibbs Racing	Toyota	46	156.860	2:09:25	72.723	Report	
2022	March 26	16	A. J. Allmendinger	Kaulig Racing	Chevrolet	46	156.860	2:13:14	70.64	Report	
2023	March 25	10	A. J. Allmendinger	Kaulig Racing	Chevrolet	46	156.860	2:05:03	75.263	Report	
2024	March 23	17	Kyle Larson	Hendrick Motorsports	Chevrolet	50*	171.3	2:21:21	72.374	Report	
NASCAR Layout: 2.400 miles (3.862 km.)
2025	March 1	88	Connor Zilisch	JR Motorsports	Chevrolet	65	156.860	2:13:32	70.095	Report	
2026	February 28	9	Shane van Gisbergen	JR Motorsports	Chevrolet	65	156.860	2:12:56	70.411	Report	
2027	March 6									Report	

- 2024: Races extended due to NASCAR overtime finishes.

=== Multiple winners (drivers) ===
# Wins	Driver	Years won
2	A. J. Allmendinger	2022, 2023

=== Multiple winners (teams) ===
# Wins	Team	Years won
2	Kaulig Racing	2022, 2023
2	JR Motorsports	2025, 2026

=== Manufacturer wins ===
# Wins	Make	Years won
5	(United States) Chevrolet	2022–2026
1	(Japan) Toyota	2021

Previous race: Bennett Transportation & Logistics 250	NASCAR O'Reilly Auto Parts Series; Focused Health 250	Next race: GOVX 200
