= George Gorham Jr. =

American racing driver (born 1987)

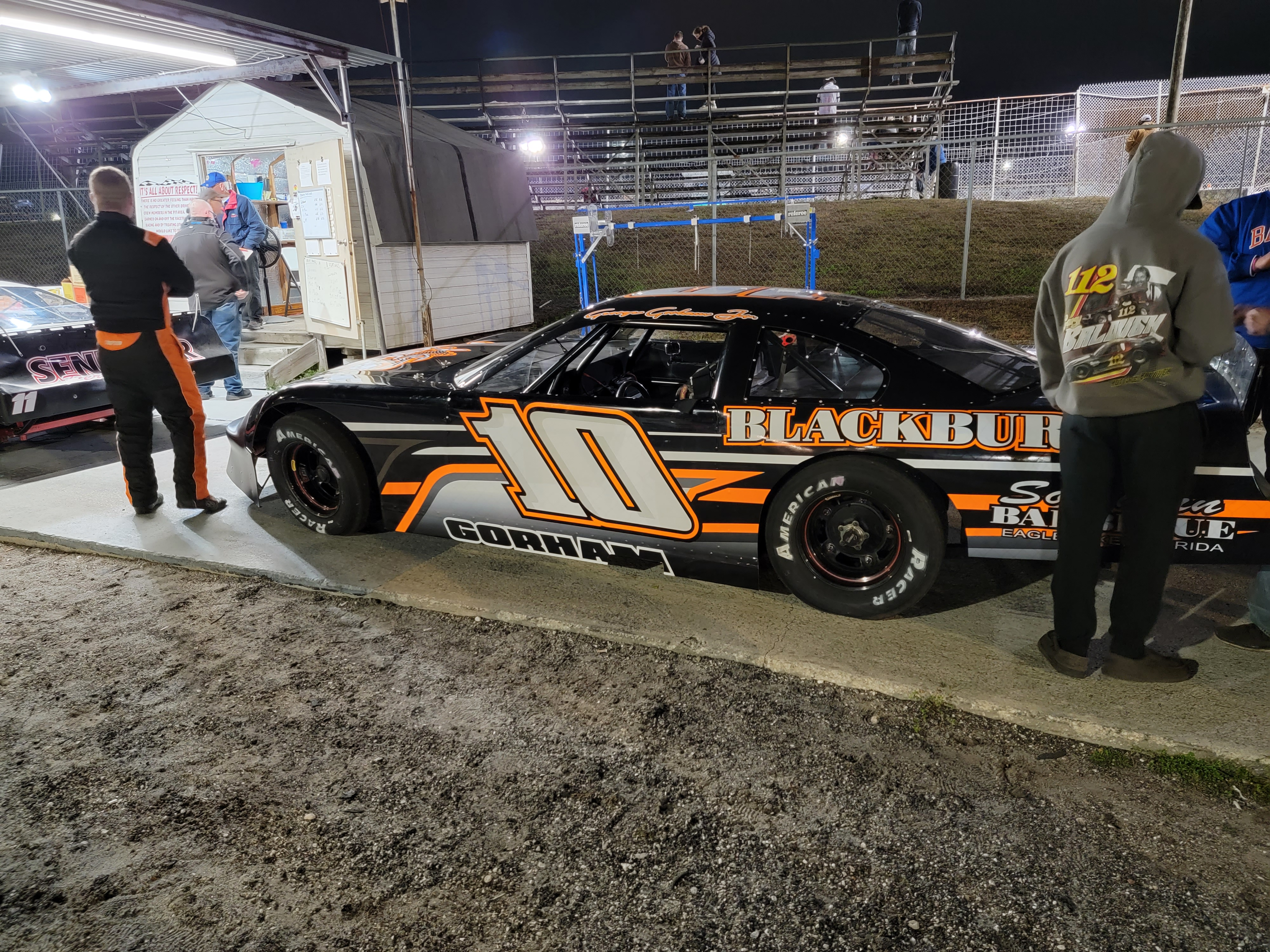
- Born: George A. Gorham Jr. April 20, 1987 (age 39); Lakeland, Florida, U.S.
- Achievements: 2021 Auburndale Speedway Super Late Model Champion 2020 Auburndale Speedway Super Late Model Champion; 2018 4-17 Southern Speedway Late Model Champion 2017 Showtime Speedway Late Model Champion

NASCAR O'Reilly Auto Parts Series career
- 1 race run over 1 year
- 2021 position: 63rd
- Best finish: 63rd (2021)
- First race: 2021 Cook Out 250 (Martinsville)
| Wins | Top tens | Poles |
|---|---|---|
| 0 | 0 | 0 |
- Statistics up to date as of December 27, 2021.

George A. Gorham Jr. (born April 20, 1987) is an American professional stock car racing driver. He primarily competes in short track racing in his home state Florida, where he drives the No. 10 late model. He also competed part-time in the NASCAR Xfinity Series, driving the No. 90 Chevrolet Camaro for DGM Racing.

== Racing career ==
Much of Gorham's racing career has been spent on short tracks in central Florida. During the mid-2000s, he raced in the FASCAR Pro Truck Series.

In 2017, Gorham won his first career late model track championship at Showtime Speedway. A second track title came at 4-17 Southern Speedway the following year. Gorham is going into the 2022 Racing season as defending back-to-back track champion at his home track of Auburndale Speedway. Gorham began competing at raceways in the Florida Panhandle in 2019 when he debuted in the Blizzard Series. In February 2021, Gorham beat Stephen Nasse to win the second leg of the Super Late Model Crown at Showtime Speedway, which earned him $10,000.

Gorham made his NASCAR Xfinity Series debut in the Cook Out 250 at Martinsville Speedway on April 11, 2021, driving the No. 90 for DGM Racing with sponsorship from previous late model sponsor Blackburn's BBQ which is a restaurant local to Gorham in Eagle Lake, FL. After starting 37th, Gorham finished ninth in the second of three stages before ending his day in 18th.

== Motorsports career results ==
=== Stock car career summary ===
| Season | Series | Team | Races | Wins | Top 5 | Top 10 | Points | Position |
|---|---|---|---|---|---|---|---|---|
| 2021 | NASCAR Xfinity Series | DGM Racing | 1 | 0 | 0 | 0 | 21 | 63rd |
| 2026 | ASA STARS National Tour | N/A | 0 | 0 | 0 | 0 | | |

=== NASCAR ===
(key) (Bold – Pole position awarded by qualifying time. Italics – Pole position earned by points standings or practice time. * – Most laps led.)

==== Xfinity Series ====
NASCAR Xfinity Series results
| Year | Team | No. | Make | 1 | 2 | 3 | 4 | 5 | 6 | 7 | 8 | 9 | 10 | 11 | 12 | 13 | 14 | 15 | 16 | 17 | 18 | 19 | 20 | 21 | 22 | 23 | 24 | 25 | 26 | 27 | 28 | 29 | 30 | 31 | 32 | 33 | NXSC | Pts | Ref |
|---|---|---|---|---|---|---|---|---|---|---|---|---|---|---|---|---|---|---|---|---|---|---|---|---|---|---|---|---|---|---|---|---|---|---|---|---|---|---|---|
| 2021 | DGM Racing | 90 | Chevy | DAY | DAY | HOM | LVS | PHO | ATL | MAR; 18 | TAL | DAR | DOV | COA | CLT | MOH | TEX | NSH | POC | ROA | ATL | NHA | GLN | IND | MCH | DAY | DAR | RCH | BRI | LVS | TAL | CLT | TEX | KAN | MAR | PHO | 63rd | 21 | |

^{*} Season still in progress
^{1} Ineligible for series points

=== ASA STARS National Tour ===
(key) (Bold – Pole position awarded by qualifying time. Italics – Pole position earned by points standings or practice time. * – Most laps led. ** – All laps led.)

ASA STARS National Tour results
| Year | Team | No. | Make | 1 | 2 | 3 | 4 | 5 | 6 | 7 | 8 | 9 | 10 | 11 | ASNTC | Pts | Ref |
|---|---|---|---|---|---|---|---|---|---|---|---|---|---|---|---|---|---|
| 2026 | N/A | 10 | Chevy | NSM | FIF | HCY | SLG | MAD | NPS | OWO | TRI | WIN | NSV | NSM; DNS | -* | -* | |
