= Jason White (American racing driver) =

American racing driver (born 1979)

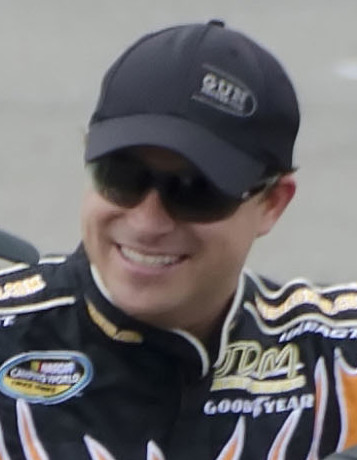
- White at Pocono Raceway in 2011
- Born: Jason Alan White; June 5, 1979 (age 47); Richmond, Virginia, U.S.

NASCAR Cup Series career
- 2 races run over 2 years
- 2012 position: 72nd
- Best finish: 69th (2011)
- First race: 2011 Good Sam RV Insurance 500 (Pocono)
- Last race: 2012 Pennsylvania 400 (Pocono)
Wins	Top tens	Poles
0	0	0

NASCAR O'Reilly Auto Parts Series career
- 55 races run over 10 years
- 2021 position: 47th
- Best finish: 29th (2003)
- First race: 1999 Kroger 200 (IRP)
- Last race: 2021 Sparks 300 (Talladega)
Wins	Top tens	Poles
0	2	0

NASCAR FedEx Freight Truck Series career
- 157 races run over 12 years
- 2014 position: 96th
- Best finish: 10th (2010)
- First race: 2001 OSH 250 (Mesa Marin)
- Last race: 2023 NextEra Energy 250 (Daytona)
Wins	Top tens	Poles
0	21	1
- Statistics up to date as of February 17, 2023.

Jason Alan White (born June 5, 1979) is an American professional stock car racing driver. He last competed part-time in the NASCAR Xfinity Series, driving the No. 13 Ford Mustang for MBM Motorsports.

== Racing career ==
=== Early career ===
White began racing go-karts when he was eleven, and has been racing part-time since. Before moving to Busch Series, White dominated the Virginia go-kart circuit. In a five-year stretch, White won six Virginia state titles and finished in the World Karting Association top-ten for three different classes of vehicles.

=== Xfinity Series ===
White made his first starts in 1999, running the No. 28 for Larry Lockamy. He started 28th and finished 26th in a solid debut at IRP. He was then 43rd after an early crash at Bristol.

The runs earned White a spot on Felix Sabates' Chip Ganassi Racing No. 82 Chevrolet in a fill-in role in 2000. He ran the Channellock Chevrolet at South Boston, putting in his career best of 21st position. Then, he was 28th at Myrtle Beach.

White next returned in 2002, running a race at Nashville for Frank Cicci Racing. He finished 43rd at Nashville after an early engine problem. Fred Bickford then picked White up for three races, beginning with a 28th-place finish at New Hampshire. His best run came at Nazareth, where he finished 22nd before adding a 37th at Charlotte.

White's busiest year was 2003, when he earned 29th in points after a splitting rides at Davis Motorsports and Jay Robinson Racing. He ran mainly for JRR early in the year, finishing a best of 23rd at Gateway. Beginning at Nashville in June, White took over the No. 0 Davis Motorsports Chevrolet full-time. He ran solidly in that race, earning his best career finish of seventeenth. He would record one other top-20 finish at Pikes Peak, trying to do his best with the low-budget team. White was released following the Memphis race in favor of Kertus Davis.

White returned to the series in four races in 2004, all for MacDonald Motorsports. After a pair of 33rds and a 42nd at Richmond, White earned his best run of the year at Milwaukee, finishing 29th. It was also the site of his best qualifying effort of the year: 28th.

In 2006, White teamed up with the new Ashton Gray Racing, sponsored by GunBroker.com. Despite being fast in practice, the team broke before qualifying in the spring Nashville race, meaning the team's debut would come at Nashville in June. He was 36th in that race and 30th at Milwaukee. Then at Gateway Jason finished 41st due to engine problems. Next race is the Emerson Radio 250 at Richmond International Raceway. He also made one start in the series in 2007.

White returned to the Nationwide Series in 2013, driving for SR² Motorsports. In May, White recorded his best career Nationwide finish, finished eighth in the Aaron's 312, at Talladega.

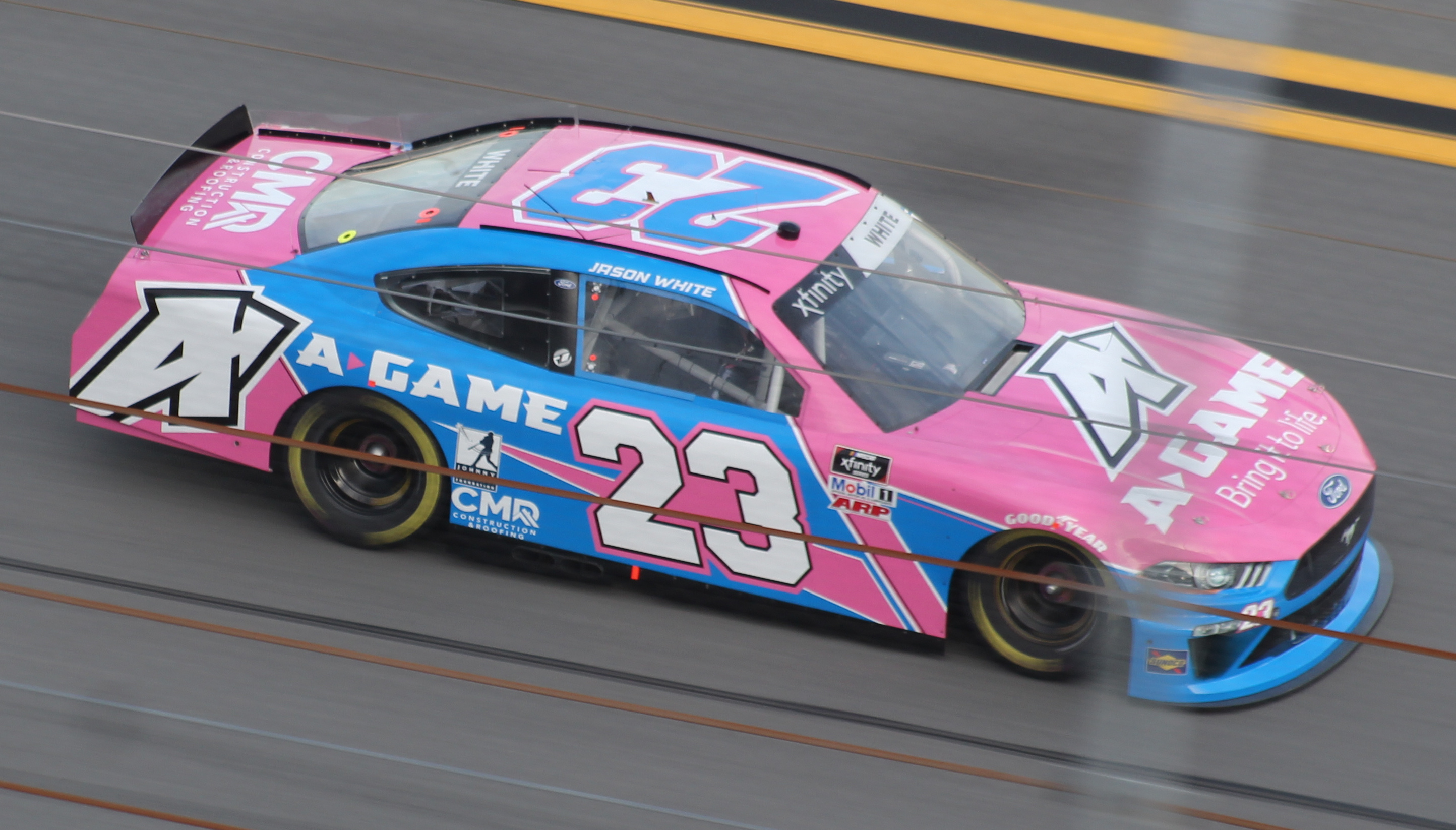
White in his return to NASCAR and the Xfinity Series at Daytona in February 2021

After being without a ride for seven years, White returned to NASCAR in 2021, driving RSS Racing/Reaume Brothers Racing No. 23 in the Xfinity Series season-opener at Daytona. He then drove the No. 13 for MBM Motorsports in the spring race at Talladega. White also raced at Talladega for MBM at the fall Talladega race but crashed in the final restart.

=== Craftsman Truck Series ===
White made his first few starts in the Craftsman Truck Series in 2001, racing in seven events. He ran the No. 86 NWTF Ford in six races. His first career start came at Mesa Marin, where he had an impressive sixteenth place run. He then followed that up with a thirteenth place run at Martinsville, which would end up being his best career finish. He had one other top-twenty for the team: an eighteenth at Pikes Peak. Later in the year, White made a one-race start for Troxell Racing. His run in Kansas resulted in a 36th-place finish, the last place truck.

White only made two starts in 2002. First, he ran the No. 0 Loni Richardson-owned Chevrolet at Texas, finishing 22nd. Then, he joined the Ware Racing Enterprises team at Kentucky. However, he only managed 34th after electrical problems.

White would make two more starts in 2003, running 30th at Dover (running the No. 35 Ford) and 35th at Kansas (running the No. 93 Troxell Racing vehicle). He did not finish either event and would turn to the Busch Series for his attention.

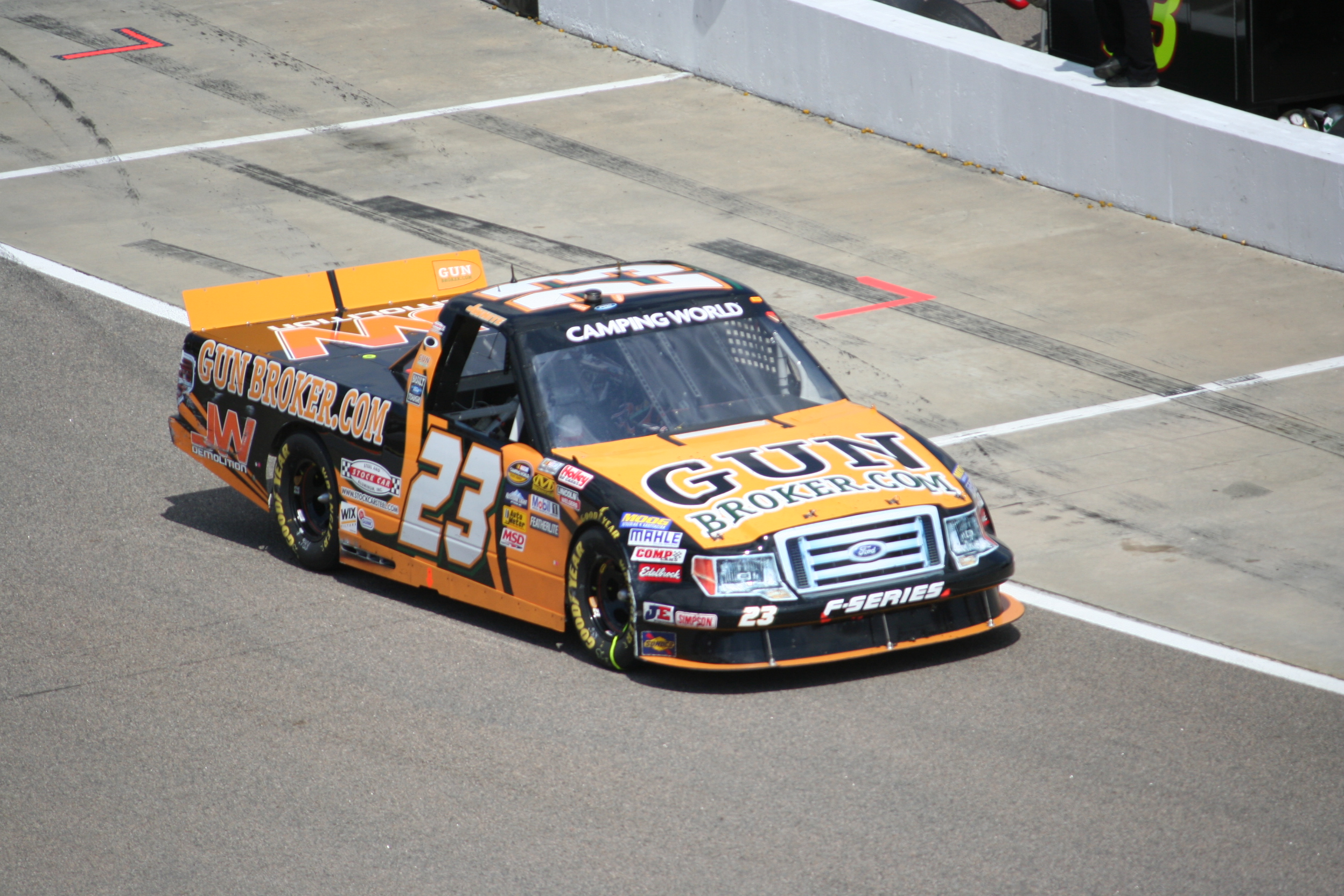
White's No. 23 truck on pit road at Rockingham in 2012

In 2007, White was scheduled to run two races with MB Motorsports along with sponsor GunBroker.com, but resulted in a one-race deal at Daytona. In April, it was announced that White would run the rest of 2007 season in the No. 7 for Pennington Motorsports with sponsorship from Hooters Energy Drink. For 2008, White joined SS-Green Light Racing and brought along GunBroker.com as a sponsor and had a fair, but uneventful season, which placed him in a Toyota for one race. In 2009, White signed up with GunBroker Racing to drive a full-season in the No. 23 GunBroker.com Dodge Ram. White scored his season best finish at Kansas in May, placing in the top-ten. White also led 86 laps at the O'Reilly 200 at Bristol Motor Speedway but finished fourteenth after a late pit stop. In September, White had his career best qualifying effort and career best finish of third at Las Vegas Motor Speedway. For 2010, White and GunBroker moved to SS-Green Light Racing, where they started off the season on a high note by winning the pole for the NextEra Energy Resources 250 at Daytona International Speedway. White had his best season to date, grabbing three top-fives and seven top-tens en route to finishing tenth in points. White and GunBroker.com left SS-Green Light Racing at season's end and moved to the upstart Joe Denette Motorsports. However, White and JDM struggled to a fifteenth place finish in points, and White and GunBroker left to form their own team for 2012.

=== Cup Series ===
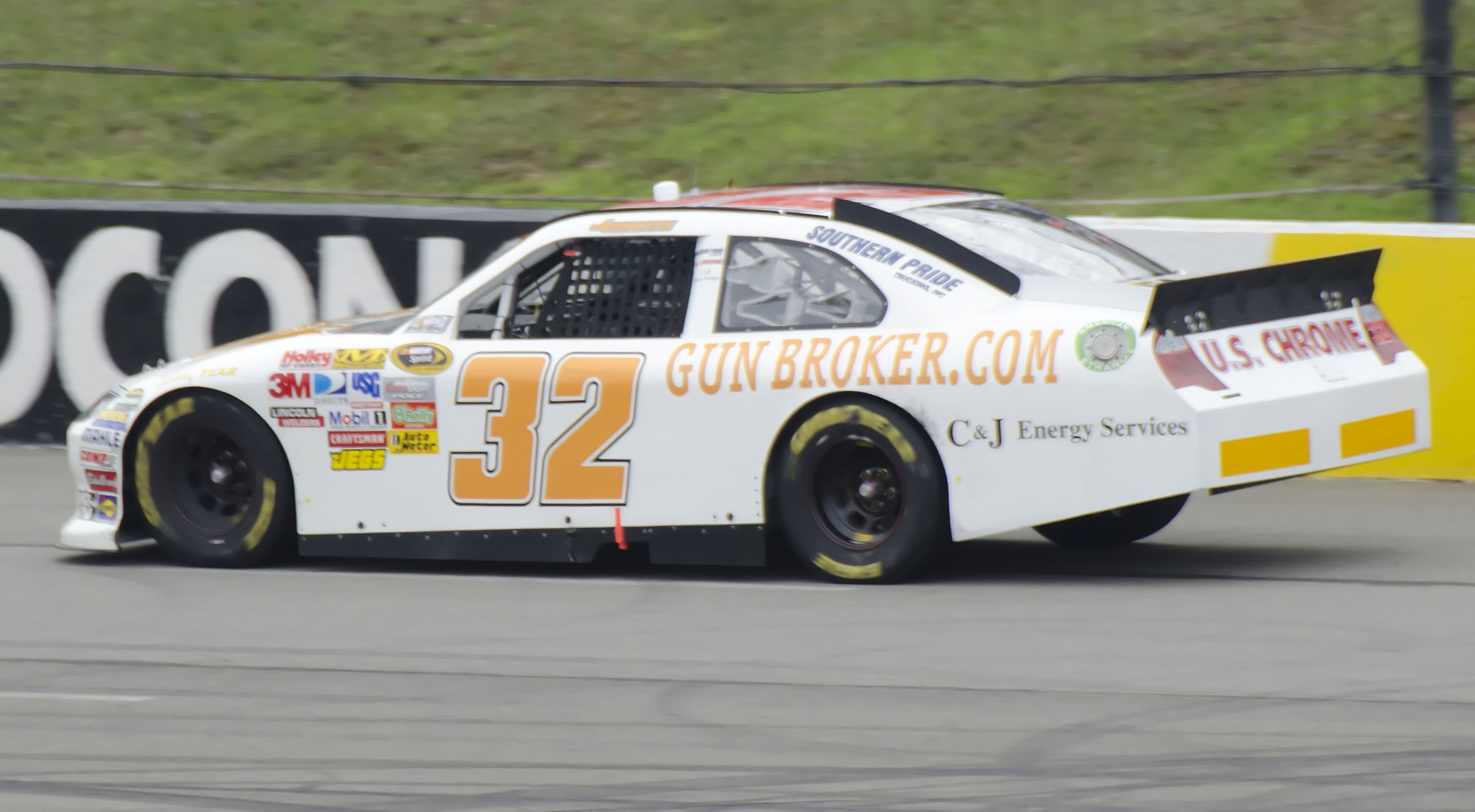
White in his Cup Series debut at Pocono in August 2011

On August 7, 2011, White made his debut in the NASCAR Sprint Cup Series at Pocono Raceway, driving the No. 32 for FAS Lane Racing. He returned to drive for the team in the Sprint Cup Series race at Pocono a year later, replacing John Wes Townley.

== Legal issues ==
On August 3, 2023, White was arrested in Huntersville, North Carolina for DWI. On August 17, NASCAR suspended him indefinitely for violating Section 4.4. D. of the NASCAR Rule Book, stating actions detrimental to stock car racing - particularly on being charged with or convicted of significant criminal violations.

== Motorsports career results ==
=== NASCAR ===
(key) (Bold – Pole position awarded by qualifying time. Italics – Pole position earned by points standings or practice time. * – Most laps led.)

==== Sprint Cup Series ====
NASCAR Sprint Cup Series results
Year	Team	No.	Make	1	2	3	4	5	6	7	8	9	10	11	12	13	14	15	16	17	18	19	20	21	22	23	24	25	26	27	28	29	30	31	32	33	34	35	36	NSCC	Pts	Ref
2011	FAS Lane Racing	32	Ford	DAY	PHO	LVS	BRI	CAL	MAR	TEX	TAL	RCH	DAR	DOV	CLT	KAN	POC	MCH	SON	DAY	KEN	NHA	IND	POC; 33	GLN	MCH	BRI	ATL	RCH	CHI	NHA	DOV	KAN	CLT	TAL	MAR	TEX	PHO	HOM	69th	0^{1}	
2012	FAS Lane Racing	32	Ford	DAY	PHO	LVS	BRI	CAL	MAR	TEX	KAN	RCH	TAL	DAR	CLT	DOV	POC	MCH	SON	KEN	DAY	NHA	IND	POC; 31	GLN	MCH	BRI	ATL	RCH	CHI	NHA	DOV	TAL	CLT	KAN	MAR	TEX	PHO	HOM	72nd	0^{1}	

==== Xfinity Series ====
NASCAR Xfinity Series results
Year	Team	No.	Make	1	2	3	4	5	6	7	8	9	10	11	12	13	14	15	16	17	18	19	20	21	22	23	24	25	26	27	28	29	30	31	32	33	34	35	NXSC	Pts	Ref
1999	Lockamy Racing	28	Chevy	DAY	CAR	LVS	ATL	DAR	TEX	NSV	BRI	TAL	CAL	NHA	RCH	NZH	CLT	DOV	SBO	GLN	MLW	MYB	PPR	GTY	IRP; 26	MCH	BRI; 43	DAR	RCH; DNQ	DOV	CLT	CAR	MEM	PHO	HOM				99th	119	
2000	Team SABCO	82	Chevy	DAY	CAR	LVS	ATL	DAR	BRI	TEX	NSV	TAL	CAL	RCH	NHA	CLT	DOV	SBO; 21	MYB; 28	GLN	MLW	NZH	PPR	GTY	IRP	MCH	BRI	DAR	RCH	DOV	CLT	CAR	MEM	PHO	HOM				85th	179	
2002	PF2 Motorsports	34	Chevy	DAY	CAR	LVS	DAR	BRI	TEX	NSH; 43	TAL	CAL	RCH																										75th	262	
2002	PF2 Motorsports	94	Chevy											NHA; 28	NZH; 22	CLT; 37	DOV	NSH	KEN	MLW	DAY	CHI	GTY	PPR	IRP	MCH	BRI	DAR	RCH	DOV	KAN								75th	262	
2002	Sadler Brothers Racing	95	Ford																													CLT; DNQ	MEM	ATL	CAR	PHO	HOM		75th	262	
2003	Jay Robinson Racing	39	Ford	DAY	CAR	LVS	DAR; 40			TAL; 31			RCH; 42				DOV; 34																						29th	1754	
2003	Davis Motorsports	70	Chevy					BRI; 32	TEX																IRP; 30		BRI; DNQ												29th	1754	
2003	Davis Motorsports	0	Chevy								NSH; 21	CAL						NSH; 17	KEN; 25	MLW; 27	DAY; 26	CHI; 23	NHA; 22	PPR; 20		MCH; 32		DAR; 30	RCH; 30	DOV; 23	KAN; 35	CLT; 35	MEM; 41	ATL	PHO	CAR	HOM		29th	1754	
2003	Jay Robinson Racing	49	Ford											GTY; 23	NZH; 26	CLT																							29th	1754	
2004	MacDonald Motorsports	72	Chevy	DAY	CAR	LVS	DAR; 33	BRI; 33	TEX	NSH	TAL	CAL	GTY	RCH; 42	NZH	CLT	DOV	NSH	KEN	MLW; 29	DAY	CHI	NHA	PPR	IRP	MCH	BRI	CAL	RCH	DOV	KAN	CLT							85th	241	
2004	MacDonald Motorsports	71	Chevy																														MEM; DNQ	ATL	PHO	DAR	HOM		85th	241	
2006	Ashton Gray Racing	08	Dodge	DAY	CAL	MXC	LVS	ATL	BRI	TEX	NSH; DNQ	PHO	TAL	RCH	DAR	CLT	DOV	NSH; 36	KEN	MLW; 30	DAY	CHI	NHA	MAR; 34	GTY; 41	IRP	GLN	MCH	BRI	CAL	RCH	DOV	KAN	CLT	MEM	TEX	PHO	HOM	88th	229	
2007	Pennington Motorsports	08	Dodge	DAY	CAL	MXC	LVS	ATL	BRI	NSH	TEX	PHO	TAL	RCH	DAR	CLT	DOV	NSH	KEN	MLW	NHA	DAY	CHI	GTY	IRP; 26	CGV	GLN	MCH	BRI; DNQ	CAL	RCH	DOV	KAN	CLT	MEM	TEX	PHO	HOM	159th	–	
2008	CFK Motorsports	78	Dodge	DAY	CAL	LVS	ATL	BRI	NSH	TEX	PHO	MXC	TAL	RCH	DAR	CLT	DOV	NSH	KEN	MLW	NHA	DAY	CHI	GTY	IRP	CGV	GLN	MCH	BRI	CAL	RCH	DOV	KAN	CLT	MEM	TEX	PHO; DNQ	HOM	N/A	–	
2009	SK Motorsports	07	Chevy	DAY	CAL	LVS	BRI	TEX	NSH	PHO	TAL	RCH	DAR	CLT	DOV	NSH	KEN	MLW	NHA	DAY	CHI	GTY	IRP	IOW	GLN	MCH; DNQ	BRI	CGV	ATL	RCH	DOV	KAN	CAL	CLT	MEM	TEX	PHO	HOM	N/A	–	
2013	SR² Motorsports	00	Toyota	DAY; 24	PHO; 22	LVS; 25	BRI; 30	CAL; 33																															41st	138	
2013	SR² Motorsports	27	Toyota						TEX; DNQ	RCH																													41st	138	
2013	SR² Motorsports	24	Toyota								TAL; 8	DAR	CLT; 39	DOV; 32	IOW	MCH	ROA	KEN	DAY; 35	NHA	CHI	IND	IOW	GLN	MOH	BRI	ATL	RCH	CHI	KEN	DOV	KAN	CLT	TEX	PHO	HOM			41st	138	
2014	SR² Motorsports	00	Toyota	DAY; 31	PHO	LVS	BRI																																66th	25	
2014	SR² Motorsports	24	Toyota					CAL; 32	TEX	DAR	RCH	TAL	IOW	CLT	DOV	MCH	ROA	KEN	DAY	NHA	CHI	IND	IOW	GLN	MOH	BRI	ATL	RCH	CHI	KEN	DOV	KAN	CLT	TEX	PHO	HOM			66th	25	
2021	RSS Racing with Reaume Brothers Racing	23	Ford	DAY; 10	DRC	HOM	LVS	PHO	ATL	MAR																													47th	59	
2021	MBM Motorsports	13	Ford								TAL; 39	DAR	DOV	COA	CLT	MOH	TEX	NSH	POC	ROA	ATL	NHA	GLN	IRC	MCH														47th	59	
2021	MBM Motorsports	66	Ford																							DAY; 15	DAR	RCH	BRI	LVS	TAL; 28	ROV	TEX	KAN	MAR	PHO			47th	59	
2023	MBM Motorsports	13	Ford	DAY	CAL	LVS	PHO	ATL	COA	RCH	MAR	TAL; DNQ	DOV	DAR	CLT	PIR	SON	NSH	CSC	ATL	NHA	POC	ROA	MCH	IRC	GLN	DAY	DAR	KAN	BRI	TEX	ROV	LVS	HOM	MAR	PHO			N/A	0	

==== Craftsman Truck Series ====
NASCAR Craftsman Truck Series results
Year	Team	No.	Make	1	2	3	4	5	6	7	8	9	10	11	12	13	14	15	16	17	18	19	20	21	22	23	24	25	NCTC	Pts	Ref
2001	Impact Motorsports	86	Ford	DAY	HOM	MMR; 16	MAR; 13	GTY; 31	DAR; 25	PPR; 18	DOV; 29	TEX	MEM	MLW															43rd	637	
2001	Troxell Racing	93	Dodge												KAN; 36	KEN	NHA	IRP	NSH	CIC	NZH	RCH	SBO	TEX	LVS	PHO	CAL		43rd	637	
2002	Richardson Motorsports	0	Chevy	DAY	DAR	MAR	GTY	PPR	DOV	TEX; 22	MEM	MLW	KAN																73rd	158	
2002	Ware Racing Enterprises	81	Dodge											KEN; 34	NHA	MCH	IRP	NSH	RCH	TEX	SBO	LVS	CAL	PHO	HOM				73rd	158	
2003	Pro Motion Motorsports	35	Ford	DAY	DAR	MMR	MAR	CLT	DOV; 30	TEX	MEM	MLW																	134th	–	
2003	Troxell-MacDonald Racing	93	Chevy										KAN; 35	KEN	GTW	MCH	IRP	NSH	BRI	RCH	NHA	CAL	LVS	SBO	TEX	MAR	PHO	HOM	134th	–	
2007	MB Motorsports	63	Ford	DAY; 35	CAL	ATL	MAR																						28th	1404	
2007	Pennington Motorsports	7	Chevy					KAN; 28	CLT; DNQ	MFD; 26	DOV; 22	TEX; 22	MCH; 27	MLW; 26	MEM; 31														28th	1404	
2007	Pennington Motorsports	7	Dodge													KEN; 23	IRP; 32	NSH; 27	BRI; 34	GTW; 23	NHA; 27	LVS; 27	TAL; 35	MAR; DNQ	ATL; 31	TEX; 34	PHO; DNQ	HOM; DNQ	28th	1404	
2008	SS-Green Light Racing	08	Dodge	DAY; 22	CAL; 30	ATL; 24	MAR; 27	KAN; 15	CLT; 26	MFD; 29	DOV; 30	TEX; 29	MCH; 28	MLW; 17	MEM; 25	KEN; 18	IRP; 18	NSH; 28	BRI; 18	GTW; 30		LVS; 17	TAL; 29		ATL; 18	TEX; 25	PHO; 20	HOM; 23	19th	2338	
2008	Billy Ballew Motorsports	15	Toyota																		NHA; 21			MAR; 17					19th	2338	
2009	GunBroker Racing	23	Dodge	DAY; 22	CAL; 27	ATL; 27	MAR; 23	KAN; 10	CLT; 14	DOV; 4	TEX; 8	MCH; 14	MLW; 23	MEM; 23	KEN; 14	IRP; 26	NSH; 16	BRI; 14*	CHI; 19	IOW; 24	GTW; 20	NHA; 26	LVS; 3	MAR; 13	TAL; 32	TEX; 11	PHO; 33	HOM; 16	16th	2733	
2010	SS-Green Light Racing	23	Ford	**DAY**; 4								MCH; 7									KEN; 4				TAL; 9			HOM; 23	10th	2979	
2010	SS-Green Light Racing	23	Dodge		ATL; 11	MAR; 29	NSH; 19	KAN; 11	DOV; 14	CLT; 8	TEX; 13		IOW; 23	GTY; 11	IRP; 13	POC; 10	NSH; 28	DAR; 27	BRI; 36				LVS; 14						10th	2979	
2010	SS-Green Light Racing	23	Chevy																	CHI; 11		NHA; 14							10th	2979	
2010	SS-Green Light Racing	23	Toyota																					MAR; 4		TEX; 11	PHO; 32		10th	2979	
2011	Joe Denette Motorsports	23	Chevy	DAY; 30	PHO; 10	DAR; 33	MAR; 22	NSH; 13	DOV; 14	CLT; 14	KAN; 17	TEX; 16	KEN; 5	IOW; 25	NSH; 12	IRP; 26	POC; 17	MCH; 6	BRI; 16	ATL; 25	CHI; 24	NHA; 17	KEN; 24	LVS; 14	TAL; 5	MAR; 15	TEX; 12	HOM; 9	15th	682	
2012	GunBroker Racing	23	Ford	DAY; 5	MAR; 10	CAR; 24	KAN; 19	CLT; 6	DOV; 33	TEX; 17	KEN; 11	IOW; 14	CHI; 9	POC; 11	MCH; 2	BRI; 14	ATL; 29	IOW; 12	KEN; 20	LVS; 13	TAL; 20	MAR; 13	TEX; 19	PHO; 21	HOM; 17				11th	635	
2013	RSS Racing	93	Chevy	DAY; 30	MAR	CAR	KAN	CLT	DOV	TEX	KEN	IOW	ELD	POC	MCH	BRI	MSP	IOW	CHI	LVS	TAL	MAR	TEX	PHO	HOM				116th	0^{1}	
2014	RSS Racing	93	Chevy	DAY; 36	MAR	KAN	CLT	DOV	TEX	GTW	KEN	IOW	ELD																96th	0^{1}	
2014	NTS Motorsports	9	Chevy											POC; 11	MCH; 12	BRI	MSP	CHI	NHA										96th	0^{1}	
2014	NTS Motorsports	20	Chevy																	LVS; 23	TAL	MAR	TEX	PHO	HOM				96th	0^{1}	
2023	Tricon Garage	1	Toyota	DAY; 15	LVS	ATL	COA	TEX	BRD	MAR	KAN	DAR	NWS	CLT	GTW	NSH	MOH	POC	RCH	IRP	MLW	KAN	BRI	TAL	HOM	PHO			56th	22	

^{*} Season still in progress
^{1} Ineligible for series points
