= 2012 Pennsylvania 400 =

Race details
- Race 21 of 36 in the 2012 NASCAR Sprint Cup Series
- Date: August 5, 2012
- Location: Pocono Raceway in Long Pond, Pennsylvania
- Course: Permanent racing facility
- Course length: 2.5 miles (4.023 km)
- Distance: 98 laps, 245 mi (394.28 km)
- Scheduled distance: 160 laps, 400 mi (643.737 km)
- Weather: Isolated thunder storms with a high temperature around 80; wind out of the S at 7 mph.
- Average speed: 139.249 miles per hour (224.100 km/h)

Pole position
Driver	Juan Pablo Montoya	Earnhardt Ganassi Racing
- Time: 51.124

Most laps led
Driver	Jimmie Johnson	Hendrick Motorsports
- Laps: 44

Winner
No. 24	Jeff Gordon	Hendrick Motorsports

Television in the United States
- Network: ESPN
- Announcers: Allen Bestwick, Dale Jarrett and Andy Petree
- Nielsen ratings: 4.449 million

The 2012 Pennsylvania 400 was a NASCAR Sprint Cup Series stock car race held on August 5, 2012 at the Pocono Raceway in Long Pond, Pennsylvania. Contested over 98 laps of a scheduled 160, it was the twenty-first race of the 2012 NASCAR Sprint Cup Series season. On August 10, 2011, track president Brandon Igdalsky announced that the race will be shortened from 500 miles to 400 miles. Jeff Gordon, from the Hendrick Motorsports racing team, won his first race of the season while Kasey Kahne finished second. Martin Truex Jr. clinched the third position. The win gave Gordon his sixth at the track, at the time breaking a record shared with Bill Elliott for most wins at the track, and has since been broken by Denny Hamlin.

The race was marred by a lightning strike which killed a spectator and injured nine others as Gordon was on his way to victory lane. The race was not red flagged (suspended) until rain hit the race track after 98 laps, 42 minutes after thunderstorm warnings were issued. The incident led to stringent policy standards for Automobile Competition Committee for the United States members (including NASCAR, IndyCar, IMSA and NHRA) regarding lightning around racing venues, consistent with other sporting venues.

== Report ==
=== Background ===
Pocono Raceway, the race track where the race was held.

Pocono Raceway is one of six superspeedways to hold NASCAR races, the others being Daytona International Speedway, Michigan International Speedway, Auto Club Speedway, Indianapolis Motor Speedway and Talladega Superspeedway. The standard track at Pocono Raceway is a three-turn superspeedway that is 2.5 miles (4.0 km) long. The track's turns are banked differently; the first is banked at 14°, the second turn at 8° and the final turn with 6°. However, each of the three straightaways are banked at 2°. Brad Keselowski was the defending race winner.

Before the race, Dale Earnhardt Jr. led the Drivers' Championship with 731 points, and Matt Kenseth stood in second with 717. Greg Biffle was third in the Drivers' Championship with 709 points, five ahead of Jimmie Johnson and 42 ahead of Denny Hamlin in fourth and fifth. Kevin Harvick with 653 was even with Martin Truex Jr., as Tony Stewart with 652 points, was three ahead of Brad Keselowski, and nine in front of Clint Bowyer. In the Manufacturers' Championship, Chevrolet was leading with 144 points, 28 ahead of Toyota. Ford, with 97 points, was fourteen points ahead of Dodge in the battle for third.

=== Practice and qualifying ===
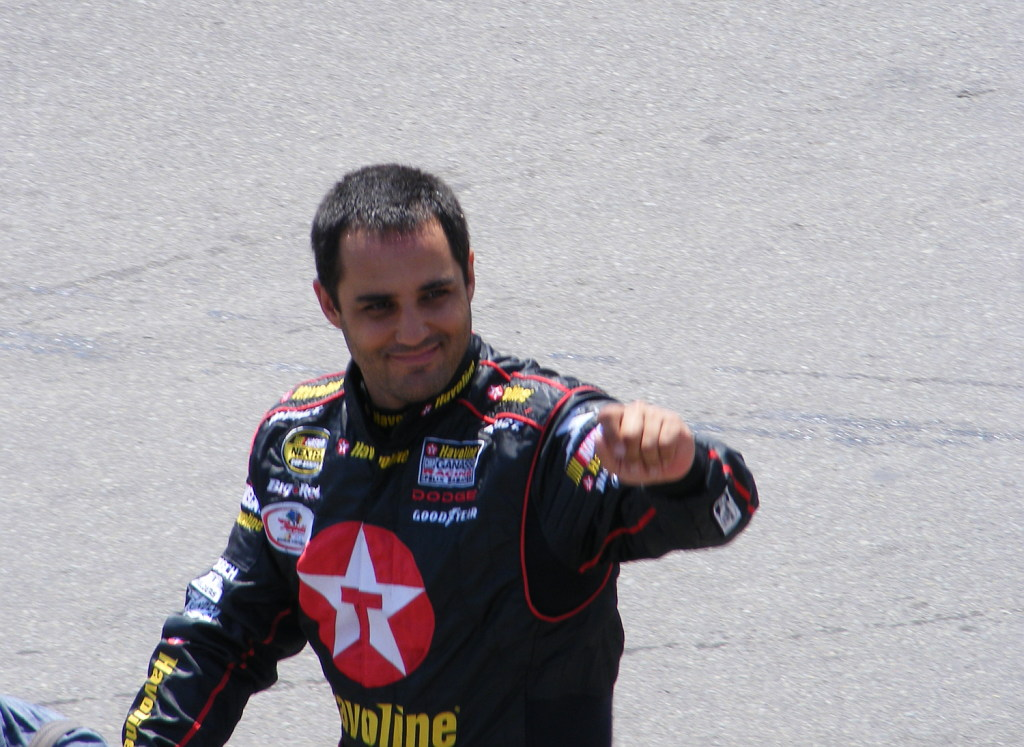
Juan Pablo Montoya (shown here in 2007) won the pole position ahead of Denny Hamlin.

Two practice sessions were held before the race on August 3, 2012. The first and second session were each 90 minutes long. Johnson was quickest with a time of 51.638 seconds in the first session, 0.088 faster than Kyle Busch. Carl Edwards was third quickest, followed by Kenseth, Biffle, and Kasey Kahne. Joey Logano was seventh, still within a three-tenths of a second of Johnson's time. Shortly before the first session concluded, Paul Menard sustained major damages to his car after crashing, causing the team to use their replacement car. In the second and final practice session, Earnhardt Jr. was quickest with a time of 50.721 seconds. Kenseth with a time of 50.855, was second quickest, ahead of Biffle, Kyle Busch, and Edwards. Jamie McMurray, Truex Jr., Jeff Gordon, Kurt Busch, and Johnson completed the first ten positions.

Forty-four cars were entered for qualifying, but only forty-three could qualify for the race because of NASCAR's qualifying procedure. Juan Pablo Montoya clinched his eighth pole position of his career, with a time of 51.124 seconds. He was joined on the front row of the grid by Hamlin. Menard qualified third, Kahne took fourth, and Marcos Ambrose started fifth. Kurt Busch, Kenseth, Earnhardt Jr., Ryan Newman and Johnson rounded out the top ten. The driver that failed to qualify for the race was Stephen Leicht.

Once the qualifying session had concluded, Montoya stated, "I know (Sunday) is going to be a reality check that we've still got to work on it a lot. But the race hasn't even started, and we haven't seen how the car works in clean air. We know there's a lot of really strong cars, but you make the right strategy and if you get track position, we've shown we've got the speed. I'm really open-minded. I told people, 'Let's enjoy today.' "

=== Race ===
The race started 90 minutes late due to a rain delay. The first ten laps of the race featured two lead changes and four others as Denny Hamlin and pole-sitter Juan Pablo Montoya repassed each other four times in two laps. Dale Earnhardt Jr. was also in contention for the lead before his transmission broke, and Jimmie Johnson led the most laps, but would crash on a restart with Matt Kenseth and Hamlin in Turn 1 on Lap 91. Jeff Gordon, who was running fifth on the restart avoided the crash, and would become the new leader. Seven laps later under caution, the thunderstorm hit the track and after 98 of the scheduled 160 laps, giving Gordon his 86th career Sprint Cup win. Kasey Kahne came in second, and his contentions in the race were dashed in pit road during the final caution, when he ran over an air hose and had a flat right-rear tire.

== Results ==
=== Qualifying ===
Grid	No.	Driver	Team	Manufacturer	Time	Speed
1	42	Juan Pablo Montoya	Earnhardt Ganassi Racing	Chevrolet	51.124	176.043
2	11	Denny Hamlin	Joe Gibbs Racing	Toyota	51.196	175.795
3	27	Paul Menard	Richard Childress Racing	Chevrolet	51.245	175.627
4	5	Kasey Kahne	Hendrick Motorsports	Chevrolet	51.300	175.439
5	9	Marcos Ambrose	Richard Petty Motorsports	Ford	51.302	51.302
6	51	Kurt Busch	Phoenix Racing	Chevrolet	51.329	175.339
7	17	Matt Kenseth	Roush Fenway Racing	Ford	51.379	175.169
8	88	Dale Earnhardt Jr.	Hendrick Motorsports	Chevrolet	51.390	175.131
9	39	Ryan Newman	Stewart–Haas Racing	Chevrolet	51.400	175.097
10	48	Jimmie Johnson	Hendrick Motorsports	Chevrolet	51.409	175.067
11	78	Regan Smith	Furniture Row Racing	Chevrolet	51.418	175.036
12	16	Greg Biffle	Roush Fenway Racing	Ford	51.439	174.964
13	43	Aric Almirola	Richard Petty Motorsports	Ford	51.486	174.805
14	20	Joey Logano	Joe Gibbs Racing	Toyota	51.489	174.795
15	56	Martin Truex Jr.	Michael Waltrip Racing	Toyota	51.541	174.618
16	1	Jamie McMurray	Earnhardt Ganassi Racing	Chevrolet	51.558	174.561
17	99	Carl Edwards	Roush Fenway Racing	Ford	51.596	174.432
18	55	Mark Martin	Michael Waltrip Racing	Toyota	51.600	174.419
19	15	Clint Bowyer	Michael Waltrip Racing	Toyota	51.631	174.314
20	18	Kyle Busch	Joe Gibbs Racing	Toyota	51.642	51.642
21	29	Kevin Harvick	Richard Childress Racing	Chevrolet	51.661	174.213
22	83	Landon Cassill	BK Racing	Toyota	51.676	174.162
23	31	Jeff Burton	Richard Childress Racing	Chevrolet	51.748	173.920
24	10	David Reutimann	Tommy Baldwin Racing	Chevrolet	51.852	173.571
25	22	Sam Hornish Jr.	Penske Racing	Dodge	51.866	173.524
26	38	David Gilliland	Front Row Motorsports	Ford	51.900	173.410
27	24	Jeff Gordon	Hendrick Motorsports	Chevrolet	51.933	173.300
28	14	Tony Stewart	Stewart–Haas Racing	Chevrolet	51.964	173.197
29	13	Casey Mears	Germain Racing	Ford	52.064	172.864
30	19	Mike Bliss	Humphrey Smith Racing	Toyota	52.138	172.619
31	2	Brad Keselowski	Penske Racing	Dodge	52.213	172.371
32	34	David Ragan	Front Row Motorsports	Ford	52.314	172.038
33	23	Scott Riggs	R3 Motorsports	Toyota	52.351	171.917
34	26	Josh Wise	Front Row Motorsports	Ford	52.352	171.913
35	37	J. J. Yeley	Max Q Motorsports	Chevrolet	52.384	171.808
36	30	David Stremme	Inception Motorsports	Toyota	52.436	171.638
37	93	Travis Kvapil	BK Racing	Toyota	52.556	171.246
38	87	Joe Nemechek	NEMCO Motorsports	Toyota	52.692	170.804
39	47	Bobby Labonte	JTG Daugherty Racing	Toyota	52.737	170.658
40	91	Reed Sorenson	Humphrey Smith Racing	Ford	52.761	170.581
41	32	Jason White	FAS Lane Racing	Ford	53.611	167.876
42	36	Tony Raines	Tommy Baldwin Racing	Chevrolet	—	—
43	98	Mike Skinner	Phil Parsons Racing	Ford	52.781	170.516
Failed to Qualify
	33	Stephen Leicht	Circle Sport Racing	Chevrolet	52.790	170.487

=== Race results ===
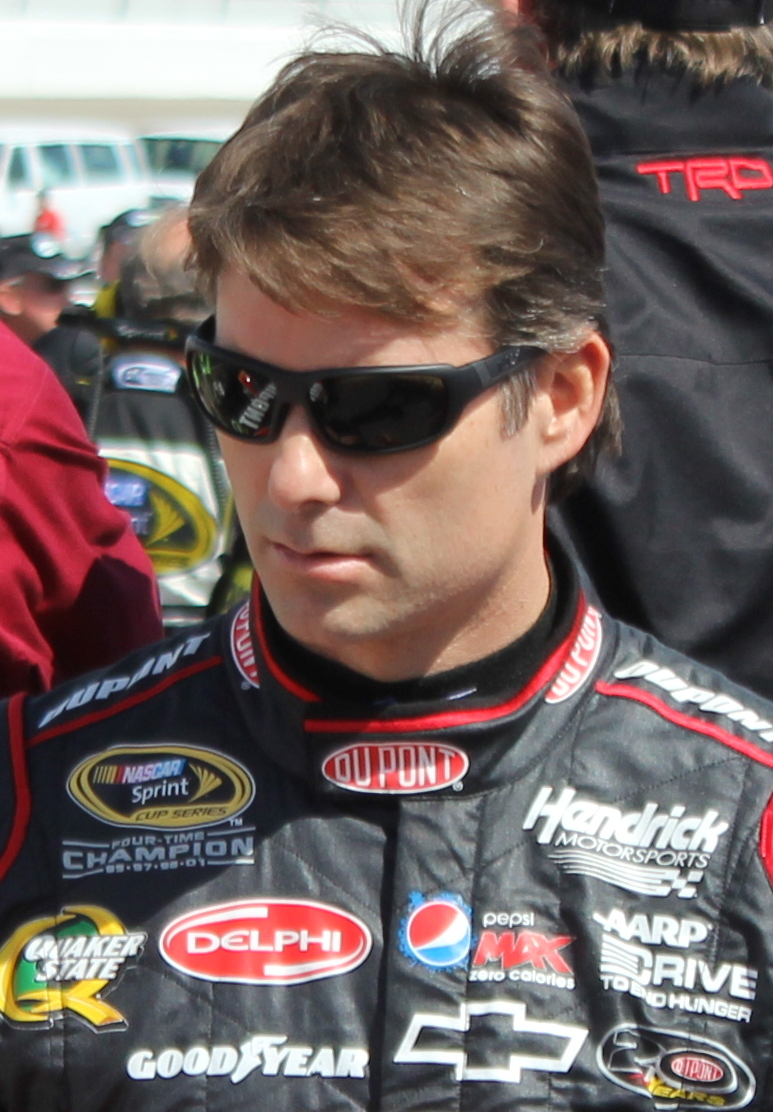
Jeff Gordon was declared the winner after rain shortened the race to 98 laps.

Pos	Car	Driver	Team	Manufacturer	Laps	Points
1	24	Jeff Gordon	Hendrick Motorsports	Chevrolet	98	47
2	5	Kasey Kahne	Hendrick Motorsports	Chevrolet	98	43
3	56	Martin Truex Jr.	Michael Waltrip Racing	Toyota	98	41
4	2	Brad Keselowski	Penske Racing	Dodge	98	41
5	14	Tony Stewart	Stewart–Haas Racing	Chevrolet	98	39
6	39	Ryan Newman	Stewart–Haas Racing	Chevrolet	98	38
7	99	Carl Edwards	Roush Fenway Racing	Ford	98	37
8	15	Clint Bowyer	Michael Waltrip Racing	Toyota	98	36
9	78	Regan Smith	Furniture Row Racing	Chevrolet	98	35
10	9	Marcos Ambrose	Richard Petty Motorsports	Ford	98	34
11	27	Paul Menard	Richard Childress Racing	Chevrolet	98	33
12	55	Mark Martin	Michael Waltrip Racing	Toyota	98	32
13	20	Joey Logano	Joe Gibbs Racing	Toyota	98	31
14	48	Jimmie Johnson	Hendrick Motorsports	Chevrolet	98	32
15	16	Greg Biffle	Roush Fenway Racing	Ford	98	29
16	29	Kevin Harvick	Richard Childress Racing	Chevrolet	98	28
17	1	Jamie McMurray	Earnhardt Ganassi Racing	Chevrolet	98	28
18	43	Aric Almirola	Richard Petty Motorsports	Ford	98	26
19	22	Sam Hornish Jr.	Penske Racing	Dodge	98	0
20	42	Juan Pablo Montoya	Earnhardt Ganassi Racing	Chevrolet	98	25
21	38	David Gilliland	Front Row Motorsports	Ford	98	23
22	31	Jeff Burton	Richard Childress Racing	Chevrolet	98	22
23	17	Matt Kenseth	Roush Fenway Racing	Ford	98	22
24	10	David Reutimann	Tommy Baldwin Racing	Chevrolet	97	20
25	93	Travis Kvapil	BK Racing	Toyota	97	19
26	83	Landon Cassill	BK Racing	Toyota	97	18
27	47	Bobby Labonte	JTG Daugherty Racing	Toyota	96	17
28	34	David Ragan	Front Row Motorsports	Ford	96	16
29	11	Denny Hamlin	Joe Gibbs Racing	Toyota	90	16
30	51	Kurt Busch	Phoenix Racing	Chevrolet	84	15
31	32	Jason White	FAS Lane Racing	Ford	81	0
32	88	Dale Earnhardt Jr.	Hendrick Motorsports	Chevrolet	80	13
33	18	Kyle Busch	Joe Gibbs Racing	Toyota	74	11
34	30	David Stremme	Inception Motorsports	Toyota	43	10
35	13	Casey Mears	Germain Racing	Ford	40	9
36	87	Joe Nemechek	NEMCO Motorsports	Toyota	37	0
37	26	Josh Wise	Front Row Motorsports	Ford	34	7
38	36	Tony Raines	Tommy Baldwin Racing	Chevrolet	31	6
39	19	Mike Bliss	Humphrey Smith Racing	Toyota	29	0
40	37	J. J. Yeley	Max Q Motorsports	Chevrolet	27	4
41	98	Mike Skinner	Phil Parsons Racing	Ford	26	3
42	91	Reed Sorenson	Humphrey Smith Racing	Ford	10	0
43	23	Scott Riggs	R3 Motorsports	Toyota	9	1

== Standings after the race ==
Drivers' Championship standings

Pos	Driver	Points
1	Dale Earnhardt Jr.	744
2	Matt Kenseth	739 (–5)
3	Greg Biffle	738 (–6)
4	Jimmie Johnson	736 (–8)
5	Martin Truex Jr.	694 (–50)

Manufacturers' Championship standings

Pos	Manufacturer	Points
1	Chevrolet	153
2	Toyota	122 (–31)
3	Ford	100 (–53)
4	Dodge	87 (–66)

- Note: Only the top five positions are included for the driver standings.

== Lightning strikes ==
After the race, a spectator was killed by a lightning strike, while nine others (one critical) were injured. The nine injured spectators were taken to area hospitals, and five of them were later taken to local hospitals for examination. The track had tweeted for fans to "seek shelter as severe lightning and heavy winds are in our area", and the fans were instructed by public address systems at the track to take cover. However, fans posted on the track's Facebook page that they could not hear the warnings, and a fan tweeted to the Associated Press that the noise levels at races are so loud that little could hear the public address system. The race wasn't called until 42 minutes after the warning, leading to questions over whether or not NASCAR should have ended the race earlier or stopped the race prior to Lap 81 (which would have led to a Monday morning resumption of the race as less than half distance was reached). Race winner Jeff Gordon stated that he had heard a crack while he was on pit road.

"You could tell it was very close. I mean, that's the thing that's going to take away from the victory, is the fact that somebody was affected by that."

— Jeff Gordon

The victim, 41-year-old Brian Zimmerman from Moosic, Pennsylvania, was standing next to his car at the track's parking lot behind the Turn 3 grandstand. Bystanders had attempted to perform CPR on him until paramedics arrived. Zimmerman was later taken to the track's medical facility, and was pronounced dead at a local hospital at 6:11 pm. The victim that was in critical condition after getting struck was later in stable condition on August 6.

The American flag at the track was flown at half-mast the morning after the race. Pocono Raceway later established the "Pennsylvania 400 Memorial Fund" to help benefit the victims of the strikes.

On August 5, 2014, Zimmerman's wife sued NASCAR, seeking damages for negligence and wrongful death. A jury deemed that Pocono International Raceway was negligent, but did not find that this negligence was responsible for the death of Zimmerman. NASCAR was not found to be negligent in any of the lawsuits.

=== Aftermath ===
As a result, ACCUS-FIA, the governing body on motorsport in the United States that consists of the major motorsport sanctioning bodies (NASCAR, INDYCAR, IMSA, NHRA, SCCA, USAC, WKA), has adopted rules on lightning consistent with other sporting events. This applies to all motorsport in the United States governed by ACCUS-FIA members. If, at any time, weather radar detects lightning inside a 13 kilometer (eight mile) radius of the venue, spectator warnings are immediately delivered to clear the grandstands by public address system and video boards at the circuit. The race is immediately suspended, with a 30-minute suspension clock starting immediately. The safety car is deployed and leads the field to pit lane, with an immediate red flag. All race marshals are immediately sent indoors to a safe area, most transported by safety trucks. Teams then cover cars (removing electrical equipment) with drivers and crews (including media) headed to an indoor media center. For each lightning strike inside the radius (marked on the weather radar), the 30-minute clock is reset. Activity may not resume until the 13 km area suffers no lightning strikes for 30 consecutive minutes.

Previous race: 2012 Brickyard 400	Sprint Cup Series; 2012 season	Next race: 2012 Finger Lakes 355 at The Glen
