= 2021 Ag-Pro 300 =

Race details
- Race 8 of 33 in the 2021 NASCAR Xfinity Series season
- Date: April 24, 2021
- Location: Talladega Superspeedway in Lincoln, Alabama
- Course: Permanent racing facility
- Course length: 2.66 miles (4.281 km)
- Distance: 90 laps, 239.40 mi (385.277 km)
- Scheduled distance: 113 laps, 300.58 mi (483.737 km)
- Average speed: 139.164 mph

Pole position
Driver	Austin Cindric	Team Penske
- Grid positions set by competition-based formula

Most laps led
Driver	Austin Cindric	Team Penske
- Laps: 24

Winner
No. 10	Jeb Burton	Kaulig Racing

Television in the United States
- Network: FOX
- Announcers: Adam Alexander, Tyler Reddick, and Joey Logano

The 2021 Ag-Pro 300 was a NASCAR Xfinity Series race held on April 24, 2021. It was contested over 90 laps—shortened from 113 laps due to rain—on the 2.66-mile (4.28 km) superspeedway. It was the eighth race of the 2021 NASCAR Xfinity Series season. Kaulig Racing driver Jeb Burton, collected his first career Xfinity series win.

== Report ==
=== Background ===
Talladega Superspeedway, formerly known as Alabama International Motor Speedway, is a motorsports complex located north of Talladega, Alabama in Lincoln, Alabama. It is located on the former Anniston Air Force Base in the small city of Lincoln. A tri-oval, the track was constructed in 1969 by the International Speedway Corporation, a business controlled by the France family. Talladega is most known for its steep banking. The track currently hosts NASCAR's Cup Series, Xfinity Series and Camping World Truck Series. Talladega is the longest NASCAR oval with a length of 2.66-mile-long (4.28 km) tri-oval like the Daytona International Speedway, which is 2.5-mile-long (4.0 km).

=== Entry list ===
- (R) denotes rookie driver.
- (i) denotes driver who is ineligible for series driver points.

No.	Driver	Team	Manufacturer
0	Jeffrey Earnhardt	JD Motorsports	Chevrolet
1	Michael Annett	JR Motorsports	Chevrolet
2	Myatt Snider	Richard Childress Racing	Chevrolet
02	Brett Moffitt	Our Motorsports	Chevrolet
03	Andy Lally	Our Motorsports	Chevrolet
4	Landon Cassill	JD Motorsports	Chevrolet
5	Matt Mills	B. J. McLeod Motorsports	Chevrolet
6	Ryan Vargas (R)	JD Motorsports	Chevrolet
7	Justin Allgaier	JR Motorsports	Chevrolet
07	Joe Graf Jr.	SS-Green Light Racing	Chevrolet
8	Josh Berry(R)	JR Motorsports	Chevrolet
9	Noah Gragson	JR Motorsports	Chevrolet
10	Jeb Burton	Kaulig Racing	Chevrolet
11	Justin Haley	Kaulig Racing	Chevrolet
13	Jason White	MBM Motorsports	Ford
15	Colby Howard	JD Motorsports	Chevrolet
16	A. J. Allmendinger	Kaulig Racing	Chevrolet
18	Daniel Hemric	Joe Gibbs Racing	Toyota
19	Brandon Jones	Joe Gibbs Racing	Toyota
20	Harrison Burton	Joe Gibbs Racing	Toyota
22	Austin Cindric	Team Penske	Ford
23	Natalie Decker	Our Motorsports	Chevrolet
26	Colin Garrett	Sam Hunt Racing	Toyota
28	Joey Gase	SS-Green Light Racing with Rick Ware Racing	Chevrolet
31	Jordan Anderson (I)	Jordan Anderson Racing	Chevrolet
36	Alex Labbé	DGM Racing	Chevrolet
39	Ryan Sieg	RSS Racing	Ford
44	Tommy Joe Martins	Martins Motorsports	Chevrolet
47	Kyle Weatherman	Mike Harmon Racing	Chevrolet
48	Jade Buford (R)	Big Machine Racing Team	Chevrolet
51	Jeremy Clements	Jeremy Clements Racing	Chevrolet
52	Gray Gaulding	Means Racing	Chevrolet
54	Ty Dillon	Joe Gibbs Racing	Toyota
61	David Starr	Hattori Racing Enterprises	Toyota
66	Timmy Hill	MBM Motorsports	Ford
68	Brandon Brown	Brandonbilt Motorsports	Chevrolet
74	Bayley Currey	Mike Harmon Racing	Chevrolet
77	Ronnie Bassett Jr.	Bassett Racing	Chevrolet
78	Jesse Little	B. J. McLeod Motorsports	Chevrolet
90	Caesar Bacarella	DGM Racing	Chevrolet
92	Josh Williams	DGM Racing	Chevrolet
98	Riley Herbst	Stewart-Haas Racing	Ford
99	Mason Massey	B. J. McLeod Motorsports	Toyota
Official entry list

== Qualifying ==
Austin Cindric was awarded the pole for the race as determined by competition-based formula. Jordan Anderson, Ronnie Bassett Jr., and Andy Lally did not have enough points to qualify for the race.

=== Starting Lineups ===
Pos	No	Driver	Team	Manufacturer
1	22	Austin Cindric	Team Penske	Ford
2	18	Daniel Hemric	Joe Gibbs Racing	Toyota
3	20	Harrison Burton	Joe Gibbs Racing	Toyota
4	9	Noah Gragson	JR Motorsports	Chevrolet
5	11	Justin Haley	Kaulig Racing	Chevrolet
6	8	Josh Berry (R)	JR Motorsports	Chevrolet
7	19	Brandon Jones	Joe Gibbs Racing	Toyota
8	7	Justin Allgaier	JR Motorsports	Chevrolet
9	10	Jeb Burton	Kaulig Racing	Chevrolet
10	2	Myatt Snider	Richard Childress Racing	Chevrolet
11	16	A. J. Allmendinger	Kaulig Racing	Chevrolet
12	1	Michael Annett	JR Motorsports	Chevrolet
13	02	Brett Moffitt	Our Motorsports	Chevrolet
14	51	Jeremy Clements	Jeremy Clements Racing	Chevrolet
15	92	Josh Williams	DGM Racing	Chevrolet
16	54	Ty Dillon	Joe Gibbs Racing	Toyota
17	39	Ryan Sieg	RSS Racing	Chevrolet
18	68	Brandon Brown	Brandonbilt Motorsports	Chevrolet
19	98	Riley Herbst	Stewart-Haas Racing	Ford
20	48	Jade Buford (R)	Big Machine Racing Team	Chevrolet
21	47	Kyle Weatherman	Mike Harmon Racing	Chevrolet
22	26	Colin Garrett	Sam Hunt Racing	Toyota
23	44	Tommy Joe Martins	Martins Motorsports	Chevrolet
24	52	Gray Gaulding	Means Motorsports	Chevrolet
25	74	Bayley Currey	Mike Harmon Racing	Chevrolet
26	61	David Starr	Hattori Racing Enterprises	Toyota
27	66	Timmy Hill	MBM Motorsports	Ford
28	90	Caesar Bacarella	DGM Racing	Chevrolet
29	28	Joey Gase	SS-Green Light Racing with Rick Ware Racing	Chevrolet
30	36	Alex Labbé	DGM Racing	Chevrolet
31	99	Mason Massey	B. J. McLeod Motorsports	Toyota
32	4	Landon Cassill	JD Motorsports	Chevrolet
33	0	Jeffrey Earnhardt	JD Motorsports	Chevrolet
34	78	Jesse Little	B. J. McLeod Motorsports	Chevrolet
35	07	Joe Graf Jr.	SS-Green Light Racing	Chevrolet
36	5	Matt Mills	JD Motorsports	Chevrolet
37	15	Colby Howard	JD Motorsports	Chevrolet
38	23	Natalie Decker	Our Motorsports	Chevrolet
39	6	Ryan Vargas (R)	JD Motorsports	Chevrolet
40	13	Jason White	MBM Motorsports	Ford
Official qualifying results

== Race ==
=== Race results ===
==== Stage Results ====
Stage One Laps: 25

Pos	No	Driver	Team	Manufacturer	Points
1	11	Justin Haley	Kaulig Racing	Chevrolet	10
2	10	Jeb Burton	Kaulig Racing	Chevrolet	9
3	9	Noah Gragson	JR Motorsports	Chevrolet	8
4	22	Austin Cindric	Team Penske	Ford	7
5	20	Harrison Burton	Joe Gibbs Racing	Toyota	6
6	16	A. J. Allmendinger	Kaulig Racing	Chevrolet	5
7	18	Daniel Hemric	Joe Gibbs Racing	Toyota	4
8	19	Brandon Jones	Joe Gibbs Racing	Chevrolet	3
9	68	Brandon Brown	Brandonbilt Motorsports	Chevrolet	2
10	7	Justin Allgaier	JR Motorsports	Chevrolet	1

Stage Two Laps: 25

Pos	No	Driver	Team	Manufacturer	Points
1	9	Noah Gragson	JR Motrorsports	Chevrolet	10
2	7	Justin Allgaier	JR Motorsports	Chevrolet	9
3	22	Austin Cindric	Team Penske	Ford	8
4	19	Brandon Jones	Joe Gibbs Racing	Toyota	7
5	54	Ty Dillon	Joe Gibbs Racing	Toyota	6
6	2	Myatt Snider	Richard Childress Racing	Chevrolet	5
7	18	Daniel Hemric	Joe Gibbs Racing	Toyota	4
8	02	Brett Moffitt	Our Motorsports	Chevrolet	3
9	1	Michael Annett	JR Motorsports	Chevrolet	2
10	68	Brandon Brown	Brandonbilt Motorsports	Chevrolet	1

=== Final Stage Results ===
Laps: 22

Pos	Grid	No	Driver	Team	Manufacturer	Laps	Points	Status
1	9	10	Jeb Burton	Kaulig Racing	Chevrolet	90	49	Running
2	1	22	Austin Cindric	Team Penske	Ford	90	50	Running
3	11	16	A. J. Allmendinger	Kaulig Racing	Chevrolet	90	39	Running
4	19	98	Riley Herbst	Stewart-Haas Racing	Ford	90	33	Running
5	17	39	Ryan Sieg	Rss Racing	Ford	90	32	Running
6	4	9	Noah Gragson	JR Motorsports	Chevrolet	90	49	Running
7	18	68	Brandon Brown	Brandonbilt Motorsports	Chevrolet	90	33	Running
8	5	11	Justin Haley	Kaulig Racing	Chevrolet	90	39	Running
9	10	2	Myatt Snider	Richard Childress Racing	Chevrolet	90	33	Running
10	3	20	Harrison Burton	Joe Gibbs Racing	Toyota	90	33	Running
11	23	44	Tommy Joe Martins	Martins Motorsports	Chevrolet	90	26	Running
12	2	18	Daniel Hemric	Joe Gibbs Racing	Chevrolet	90	33	Running
13	27	66	Timmy Hill	MBM Motorsports	Ford	90	24	Running
14	14	51	Jeremy Clements	Jeremy Clements Racing	Chevrolet	90	24	Running
15	22	26	Colin Garrett	Sam Hunt Racing	Toyota	90	22	Running
16	26	61	David Starr	MBM Motorsports	Toyota	90	21	Running
17	13	02	Brett Moffitt	Our Motorsports	Chevrolet	90	23	Running
18	20	48	Jade Buford (R)	Big Machine Racing Team	Chevrolet	90	19	Running
19	37	15	Colby Howard	JD Motorsports	Chevrolet	90	18	Running
20	32	4	Landon Cassill	JD Motorsports	Chevrolet	90	17	Running
21	30	36	Alex Labbé	DGM Racing	Chevrolet	90	16	Running
22	33	0	Jeffrey Earnhardt	JD Motorsports	Chevrolet	90	15	Running
23	21	47	Kyle Weatherman	Mike Harmon Racing	Chevrolet	90	14	Running
24	38	23	Natalie Decker	Our Motorsports	Chevrolet	90	13	Running
25	36	5	Matt Mills	B. J. McLeod Motorsports	Chevrolet	90	12	Running
26	34	78	Jesse Little	B. J. McLeod Motorsports	Chevrolet	90	11	Running
27	31	99	Mason Massey	B. J. McLeod Motorsports	Chevrolet	90	10	Running
28	15	92	Josh Williams	DGM Racing	Chevrolet	90	9	Running
29	8	7	Justin Allgaier	JR Motorsports	Chevrolet	90	18	Running
30	39	6	Ryan Vargas (R)	JD Motorsports	Chevrolet	90	7	Running
31	6	8	Josh Berry (R)	JR Motorsports	Chevrolet	90	6	Running
32	12	1	Michael Annett	JR Motorsports	Chevrolet	88	7	Running
33	35	07	Joe Graf Jr.	SS-Green Light Racing	Chevrolet	88	4	Running
34	24	52	Gray Gaulding	Means Motorsports	Chevrolet	87	3	Electrical
35	16	54	Ty Dillon	Joe Gibbs Racing	Toyota	87	8	Accident
36	29	28	Joey Gase	SS-Green Light Racing with Rick Ware Racing	Ford	85	3	Running
37	7	19	Brandon Jones	Joe Gibbs Racing	Toyota	84	11	Accident
38	28	90	Caesar Bacarella	DGM Racing	Chevrolet	51	1	Suspension
39	40	13	Jason White	MBM Motorsports	Ford	51	1	Suspension
40	25	74	Bayley Currey	Mike Harmon Racing	Chevrolet	34	1	Overheating
Official race results

=== Race statistics ===
- Lead changes: 22 among 12 different drivers
- Cautions/Laps: 4 for 15
- Time of race: 1 hour, 43 minutes, and 13 seconds
- Average speed: 139.164 mph (223.963 km/h)

Previous race: 2021 Cook Out 250	NASCAR Xfinity Series; 2021 season	Next race: 2021 Steakhouse Elite 200
