= 2020 Hooters 250 =

NASCAR Xfinity Series race

Race details
- Race 9 of 33 in the 2020 NASCAR Xfinity Series season
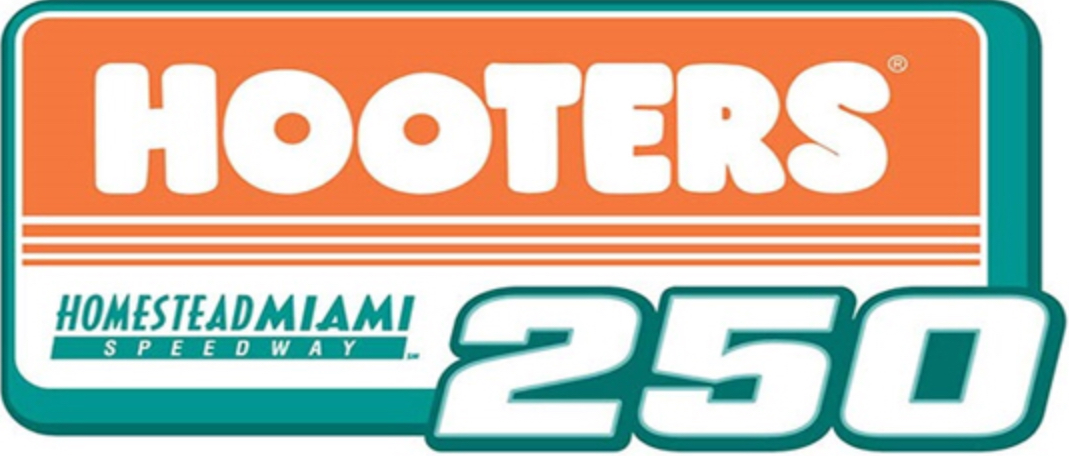
- Date: June 13, 2020
- Location: Homestead–Miami Speedway in Homestead, Florida
- Course length: 1.5 miles (2.4 km)
- Distance: 167 laps, 250.5 mi (403.14 km)

Pole position
Driver	Harrison Burton	Joe Gibbs Racing
- Grid positions set by ballot

Most laps led
Driver	Noah Gragson	JR Motorsports
- Laps: 83

Winner
No. 20	Harrison Burton	Joe Gibbs Racing

Television in the United States
- Network: FOX
- Announcers: Adam Alexander, Clint Bowyer, and Jamie McMurray

Radio in the United States
- Radio: MRN
- Booth announcers: Mike Bagley and Alex Hayden
- Turn announcers: Dave Moody (1 & 2) and Jeff Striegle (3 & 4)

The 2020 Hooters 250 was a NASCAR Xfinity Series race held on June 13, 2020 at Homestead–Miami Speedway in Homestead, Florida. Contested over 167 laps on the 1.5-mile (2.4 km) oval, it was the ninth race of the 2020 NASCAR Xfinity Series season and the first of two races for the Xfinity Series at Homestead. Joe Gibbs Racing's Harrison Burton won his second race of the season and became the track's youngest series race winner.

The race was originally scheduled to be held on March 21, but was rescheduled due to the COVID-19 pandemic.

== Report ==
=== Background ===
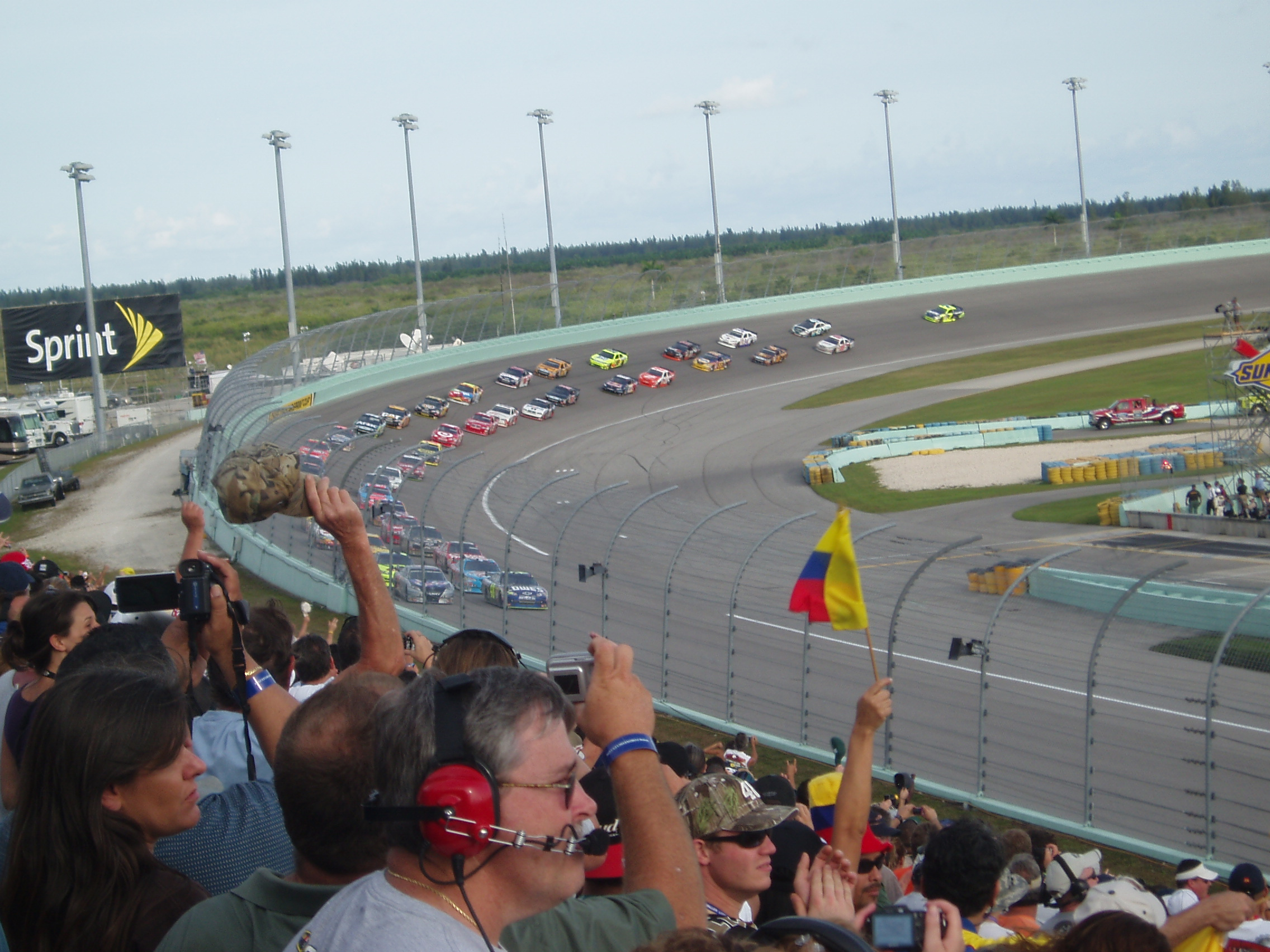
Homestead–Miami Speedway, the track where the race was held.

Homestead-Miami Speedway is a motor racing track located in Homestead, Florida. The track, which has several configurations, has promoted several series of racing, including NASCAR, the NTT IndyCar Series and the Grand-Am Rolex Sports Car Series

From 2002 to 2019, Homestead-Miami Speedway hosted the final race of the season in all three of NASCAR's series: the NASCAR Cup Series, Xfinity Series and Gander RV & Outdoors Truck Series.

The race was held without fans in attendance due to the ongoing COVID-19 pandemic.

=== Entry list ===
- (R) denotes rookie driver.
- (i) denotes driver who is ineligible for series driver points.

No.	Driver	Team	Manufacturer	Sponsor
0	Jeffrey Earnhardt	JD Motorsports	Chevrolet	EcoVirux
1	Michael Annett	JR Motorsports	Chevrolet	Allstate Parts & Service Group
02	Brett Moffitt (i)	Our Motorsports	Chevrolet	Robert B. Our Co,
4	Jesse Little (R)	JD Motorsports	Chevrolet	Series Seating, KSDT CPA
5	Matt Mills	B. J. McLeod Motorsports	Chevrolet	J.F. Electric
6	B. J. McLeod	JD Motorsports	Chevrolet	KSDT CPA
7	Justin Allgaier	JR Motorsports	Chevrolet	Brandt Professional Agriculture “Thank You Team BRANDT for serving the FARMERS”
07	J. J. Yeley	SS-Green Light Racing	Chevrolet	Jacob Companies
8	Dale Earnhardt Jr.	JR Motorsports	Chevrolet	Hellmann’s Mayonnaise
08	Joe Graf Jr. (R)	SS-Green Light Racing	Chevrolet	Bucked Up Energy
9	Noah Gragson	JR Motorsports	Chevrolet	PUBG Mobile
10	Ross Chastain	Kaulig Racing	Chevrolet	Nutrien Ag Solutions
11	Justin Haley	Kaulig Racing	Chevrolet	LeafFilter Gutter Protection
13	Chad Finchum	MBM Motorsports	Toyota	CrashClaimsR.Us
15	Colby Howard	JD Motorsports	Chevrolet	SANY America
18	Riley Herbst (R)	Joe Gibbs Racing	Toyota	Monster Energy
19	Brandon Jones	Joe Gibbs Racing	Toyota	Menards, Fisher Nuts “Oven Roasted, Never Fried”
20	Harrison Burton (R)	Joe Gibbs Racing	Toyota	DEX Imaging
21	Anthony Alfredo	Richard Childress Racing	Chevrolet	iRacing
22	Austin Cindric	Team Penske	Ford	PPG Painte
26	Colin Garrett	Sam Hunt Racing	Toyota	The Rosie Network, Racing for Heroes
36	Alex Labbé	DGM Racing	Chevrolet	Globocam, Rousseau Metal
39	Ryan Sieg	RSS Racing	Chevrolet	CMRRoofing.com
44	Tommy Joe Martins	Martins Motorsports	Chevrolet	Gilreath Farms Red Angus “The New Black”
47	Kyle Weatherman	Mike Harmon Racing	Chevrolet	#BackTheBlue
51	Jeremy Clements	Jeremy Clements Racing	Chevrolet	Fly & Form Structures
52	Kody Vanderwal (R)	Means Racing	Chevrolet	Advanced Dairy Service
61	Timmy Hill (i)	Hattori Racing	Toyota	RoofClaim.com
66	Stephen Leicht	MBM Motorsports	Toyota	JaniKing
68	Brandon Brown	Brandonbilt Motorsports	Chevrolet	Brandonbilt Motorsports
74	Bayley Currey (i)	Mike Harmon Racing	Chevrolet	Mutt and Jeff Porkskins
78	Vinnie Miller	B. J. McLeod Motorsports	Chevrolet	Koolbox Ice
90	Caesar Bacarella	DGM Racing	Chevrolet	Maxim, Alpha Prime
92	Josh Williams	DGM Racing	Chevrolet	Starbrite, Star Tron
93	Myatt Snider	RSS Racing	Chevrolet	Louisiana Hot Sauce
98	Chase Briscoe	Stewart-Haas Racing	Ford	Ford Performance Racing School
99	Stefan Parsons (i)	B. J. McLeod Motorsports	Toyota	RacingJobs.com
Official entry list

== Qualifying ==
Harrison Burton was awarded the pole for the race as determined by a random draw.

=== Starting lineup ===
Pos	No	Driver	Team	Manufacturer
1	20	Harrison Burton (R)	Joe Gibbs Racing	Toyota
2	9	Noah Gragson	JR Motorsports	Chevrolet
3	10	Ross Chastain	Kaulig Racing	Chevrolet
4	19	Brandon Jones	Joe Gibbs Racing	Toyota
5	68	Brandon Brown	Brandonbilt Motorsports	Chevrolet
6	18	Riley Herbst (R)	Joe Gibbs Racing	Toyota
7	39	Ryan Sieg	RSS Racing	Chevrolet
8	98	Chase Briscoe	Stewart-Haas Racing	Ford
9	22	Austin Cindric	Team Penske	Ford
10	11	Justin Haley	Kaulig Racing	Chevrolet
11	7	Justin Allgaier	JR Motorsports	Chevrolet
12	8	Dale Earnhardt Jr.	JR Motorsports	Chevrolet
13	02	Brett Moffitt (i)	Our Motorsports	Chevrolet
14	07	J. J. Yeley	SS-Green Light Racing	Chevrolet
15	0	Jeffrey Earnhardt	JD Motorsports	Chevrolet
16	4	Jesse Little (R)	JD Motorsports	Chevrolet
17	1	Michael Annett	JR Motorsports	Chevrolet
18	92	Josh Williams	DGM Racing	Chevrolet
19	13	Chad Finchum	MBM Motorsports	Toyota
20	78	Vinnie Miller	B. J. McLeod Motorsports	Chevrolet
21	21	Anthony Alfredo	Richard Childress Racing	Chevrolet
22	6	B. J. McLeod	JD Motorsports	Chevrolet
23	51	Jeremy Clements	Jeremy Clements Racing	Chevrolet
24	90	Caesar Bacarella	DGM Racing	Chevrolet
25	74	Bayley Currey (i)	Mike Harmon Racing	Chevrolet
26	93	Myatt Snider	RSS Racing	Chevrolet
27	99	Stefan Parsons	B. J. McLeod Motorsports	Toyota
28	61	Timmy Hill (i)	Hattori Racing	Toyota
29	47	Kyle Weatherman	Mike Harmon Racing	Chevrolet
30	52	Kody Vanderwal (R)	Means Racing	Chevrolet
31	15	Colby Howard	JD Motorsports	Chevrolet
32	08	Joe Graf Jr. (R)	SS-Green Light Racing	Chevrolet
33	66	Stephen Leicht	MBM Motorsports	Toyota
34	44	Tommy Joe Martins	Martins Motorsports	Chevrolet
35	5	Matt Mills	B. J. McLeod Motorsports	Chevrolet
36	36	Alex Labbé	DGM Racing	Chevrolet
37	26	Colin Garrett	Sam Hunt Racing	Toyota
Official starting lineup

== Race ==
=== Race results ===
==== Stage Results ====
Stage One

Laps: 40

Pos	No	Driver	Team	Manufacturer	Points
1	39	Ryan Sieg	RSS Racing	Chevrolet	10
2	10	Ross Chastain	Kaulig Racing	Chevrolet	9
3	9	Noah Gragson	JR Motorsports	Chevrolet	8
4	22	Austin Cindric	Team Penske	Ford	7
5	36	Alex Labbé	DGM Racing	Chevrolet	6
6	47	Kyle Weatherman	Mike Harmon Racing	Chevrolet	5
7	8	Dale Earnhardt Jr.	JR Motorsports	Chevrolet	4
8	11	Justin Haley	Kaulig Racing	Chevrolet	3
9	19	Brandon Jones	Joe Gibbs Racing	Toyota	2
10	08	Joe Graf Jr. (R)	SS-Green Light Racing	Chevrolet	1

Stage Two

Laps: 40

Pos	No	Driver	Team	Manufacturer	Points
1	9	Noah Gragson	JR Motorsports	Chevrolet	10
2	22	Austin Cindric	Team Penske	Ford	9
3	10	Ross Chastain	Kaulig Racing	Chevrolet	8
4	8	Dale Earnhardt Jr.	JR Motorsports	Chevrolet	7
5	19	Brandon Jones	Joe Gibbs Racing	Toyota	6
6	11	Justin Haley	Kaulig Racing	Chevrolet	5
7	20	Harrison Burton (R)	Joe Gibbs Racing	Toyota	4
8	21	Anthony Alfredo	Richard Childress Racing	Chevrolet	3
9	39	Ryan Sieg	RSS Racing	Chevrolet	2
10	7	Justin Allgaier	JR Motorsports	Chevrolet	1

=== Final Stage Results ===
Laps: 87

Pos	Grid	No	Driver	Team	Manufacturer	Laps	Points	Status
1	1	20	Harrison Burton (R)	Joe Gibbs Racing	Toyota	167	44	Running
2	9	22	Austin Cindric	Team Penske	Ford	167	51	Running
3	2	9	Noah Gragson	JR Motorsports	Chevrolet	167	52	Running
4	21	21	Anthony Alfredo	Richard Childress Racing	Chevrolet	167	36	Running
5	12	8	Dale Earnhardt Jr.	JR Motorsports	Chevrolet	167	43	Running
6	17	1	Michael Annett	JR Motorsports	Chevrolet	167	31	Running
7	8	98	Chase Briscoe	Stewart-Haas Racing	Ford	167	30	Running
8	4	19	Brandon Jones	Joe Gibbs Racing	Toyota	167	37	Running
9	3	10	Ross Chastain	Kaulig Racing	Chevrolet	167	45	Running
10	6	18	Riley Herbst (R)	Joe Gibbs Racing	Toyota	167	27	Running
11	14	07	J. J. Yeley	SS-Green Light Racing	Chevrolet	167	26	Running
12	23	51	Jeremy Clements	Jeremy Clements Racing	Chevrolet	167	25	Running
13	10	11	Justin Haley	Kaulig Racing	Chevrolet	167	32	Running
14	5	68	Brandon Brown	Brandonbilt Motorsports	Chevrolet	167	23	Running
15	26	93	Myatt Snider	RSS Racing	Chevrolet	166	22	Running
16	32	08	Joe Graf Jr. (R)	SS-Green Light Racing	Chevrolet	166	22	Running
17	31	15	Colby Howard	JD Motorsports	Chevrolet	166	20	Running
18	16	4	Jesse Little (R)	JD Motorsports	Chevrolet	166	20	Running
19	15	0	Jeffrey Earnhardt	JD Motorsports	Chevrolet	166	18	Running
20	18	92	Josh Williams	DGM Racing	Chevrolet	166	17	Running
21	37	26	Colin Garrett	Sam Hunt Racing	Toyota	166	16	Running
22	27	99	Stefan Parsons	B. J. McLeod Motorsports	Toyota	165	15	Running
23	28	61	Timmy Hill (i)	Hattori Racing	Toyota	165	0	Running
24	25	74	Bayley Currey (i)	Mike Harmon Racing	Chevrolet	165	0	Running
25	36	36	Alex Labbé	DGM Racing	Chevrolet	165	18	Running
26	22	6	B. J. McLeod	JD Motorsports	Chevrolet	165	11	Running
27	35	5	Matt Mills	B. J. McLeod Motorsports	Chevrolet	165	10	Running
28	7	39	Ryan Sieg	RSS Racing	Chevrolet	165	21	Running
29	24	90	Caesar Bacarella	DGM Racing	Chevrolet	163	8	Running
30	19	13	Chad Finchum	MBM Motorsports	Toyota	160	7	Power
31	34	44	Tommy Joe Martins	Martins Motorsports	Chevrolet	148	6	Running
32	11	7	Justin Allgaier	JR Motorsports	Chevrolet	146	6	Running
33	29	47	Kyle Weatherman	Mike Harmon Racing	Chevrolet	67	9	Transmission
34	20	78	Vinnie Miller	B. J. McLeod Motorsports	Chevrolet	58	3	DVP^{†}
35	13	02	Brett Moffitt (i)	Our Motorsports	Chevrolet	56	0	Accident
36	37	66	Stephen Leicht	MBM Motorsports	Toyota	8	1	Handling
37	36	52	Kody Vanderwal (R)	Means Racing	Chevrolet	3	1	Engine
Official race results

- † = Damaged Vehicle Policy

=== Race statistics ===
- Lead changes: 18 among 7 different drivers
- Cautions/Laps: 5 for 25
- Red flags: 0
- Time of race: 2 hours, 6 minutes, 34 seconds
- Average speed: 118.752 mph (191.113 km/h)

== Media ==
=== Television ===
The Hooters 250 was carried by FOX in the United States. Adam Alexander, Stewart-Haas Racing driver Clint Bowyer, and Jamie McMurray called the race from the Fox Sports Studio in Charlotte, with Regan Smith covering pit road.

FOX
Booth announcers	Pit reporter
Lap-by-lap: Adam Alexander Color-commentator: Clint Bowyer Color-commentator: Jamie McMurray	Regan Smith

=== Radio ===
The Motor Racing Network (MRN) called the race for radio, which was simulcast on SiriusXM NASCAR Radio. Mike Bagley and Alex Hayden anchored the action from the booth. Dave Moody called the race from turns 1 & 2 and Jeff Striegle called the action through turns 3 & 4. NASCAR Hall of Fame Executive Director Winston Kelley and Steve Post provided reports from pit road.

MRN Radio
Booth announcers	Turn announcers	Pit reporters
Lead announcer: Mike Bagley Announcer: Alex Hayden	Turns 1 & 2: Dave Moody Turns 3 & 4: Jeff Striegle	Winston Kelley Steve Post

== Standings after the race ==
Drivers' Championship standings

	Pos	Driver	Points
1	1	Noah Gragson	388
1	2	Chase Briscoe	370 (-18)
	3	Harrison Burton (R)	352 (-36)
1	4	Ross Chastain	340 (-48)
1	5	Austin Cindric	336 (-52)
2	6	Justin Allgaier	303 (-85)
	7	Justin Haley	299 (-89)
	8	Brandon Jones	295 (-93)
1	9	Ryan Sieg	238 (-150)
3	10	Michael Annett	229 (-159)
	11	Riley Herbst (R)	228 (-160)
3	12	Daniel Hemric	222 (-166)
Official driver's standings

- Note: Only the first 12 positions are included for the driver standings.
- . – Driver has clinched a position in the NASCAR playoffs.

Previous race: 2020 EchoPark 250	NASCAR Xfinity Series; 2020 season	Next race: 2020 Contender Boats 250
