= 2021 Wawa 250 =

Race details
- Race 23 of 33 of the 2021 NASCAR Xfinity Series
- Date: August 27–28 2021
- Location: Daytona Beach, Florida, Daytona International Speedway
- Course: Permanent racing facility
- Course length: 2.5 miles (4.0 km)
- Distance: 100 laps, 250 mi (402.3 km)
- Scheduled distance: 100 laps, 250 mi (402.3 km)
- Average speed: 121.753 miles per hour (195.942 km/h)

Pole position
Driver	A. J. Allmendinger	Kaulig Racing
- Grid positions set by competition-based formula

Most laps led
Driver	A. J. Allmendinger	Kaulig Racing
- Laps: 29

Winner
No. 11	Justin Haley	Kaulig Racing

Television in the United States
- Network: NBCSN
- Announcers: Jeff Burton, Dale Earnhardt Jr., Steve Letarte

Radio in the United States
- Radio: Motor Racing Network

The 2021 Wawa 250 was the 23rd stock car race of the 2021 NASCAR Xfinity Series season, and the 20th iteration of the event. The race was held in Daytona Beach, Florida at Daytona International Speedway on both days of August 27–28, after rain delayed the race on August 27 after lap 17. The race took 100 laps to complete. Kaulig Racing would dominate the event, with them winning all stages, and with Justin Haley eventually winning the race, with A. J. Allmendinger finishing 2nd and Jeb Burton 4th. To fill in the rest of the podium positions, Justin Allgaier of JR Motorsports finished 3rd. The race ended with a 3-wide finish for the win.

== Background ==
Daytona International Speedway is one of three superspeedways to hold NASCAR races, the other two being Indianapolis Motor Speedway and Talladega Superspeedway. The standard track at Daytona International Speedway is a four-turn superspeedway that is 2.5 miles (4.0 km) long. The track's turns are banked at 31 degrees, while the front stretch, the location of the finish line, is banked at 18 degrees.

=== Entry list ===
#	Driver	Team	Make	Sponsor
0	Jeffrey Earnhardt	JD Motorsports	Chevrolet	Azelea Gynecology
1	Michael Annett	JR Motorsports	Chevrolet	Pilot Flying J "If You've Got It A Trucker Brought It"
2	Myatt Snider	Richard Childress Racing	Chevrolet	Crosley Furniture
02	Brett Moffitt	Our Motorsports	Chevrolet	Fr8Auctions Camo
4	Landon Cassill	JD Motorsports	Chevrolet	Voyager
5	Matt Mills	B. J. McLeod Motorsports	Toyota	J. F. Electric
6	Ryan Vargas	JD Motorsports	Chevrolet	MaintenX Total Facilities Repair Experts
7	Justin Allgaier	JR Motorsports	Chevrolet	Brandt Professional Agriculture
07	Joe Graf Jr.	SS-Green Light Racing	Chevrolet	G Coin
8	Sam Mayer	JR Motorsports	Chevrolet	PeopleReady
9	Noah Gragson	JR Motorsports	Chevrolet	Bass Pro Shops, Black Rifle Coffee Company
10	Jeb Burton	Kaulig Racing	Chevrolet	Cheddar's Scratch Kitchen
11	Justin Haley	Kaulig Racing	Chevrolet	LeafFilter Gutter Protection
13	Timmy Hill	DGM Racing	Toyota	
15	Colby Howard	JD Motorsports	Chevrolet	KDST CPA
16	A. J. Allmendinger	Kaulig Racing	Chevrolet	HyperIce
17	J. J. Yeley	SS-Green Light Racing with Rick Ware Racing	Chevrolet	Figgers Wireless
18	Daniel Hemric	Joe Gibbs Racing	Toyota	Poppy Bank
19	Brandon Jones	Joe Gibbs Racing	Toyota	Menards, Patriot Lighting
20	Harrison Burton	Joe Gibbs Racing	Toyota	Offerpad
22	Austin Cindric	Team Penske	Ford	Carshop
23	Blaine Perkins	Our Motorsports	Chevrolet	Raceline
26	Colin Garrett	Sam Hunt Racing	Toyota	Stillhouse
31	Jordan Anderson	Jordan Anderson Racing	Chevrolet	Bommarito Automotive Group, BG Products, Inc.
36	Alex Labbé	DGM Racing	Chevrolet	Can-Am
39	Ryan Sieg	RSS Racing	Ford	CMR Construction & Roofing
44	Tommy Joe Martins	Martins Motorsports	Chevrolet	AAN Adjusters
47	Kyle Weatherman	Mike Harmon Racing	Chevrolet	Axe Crossbows
48	Jade Buford	Big Machine Racing Team	Chevrolet	Big Machine Vodka Spiked Cooler
51	Jeremy Clements	Jeremy Clements Racing	Chevrolet	All South Electric, 1 Stop Convenience Store
52	Spencer Boyd	Jimmy Means Racing	Chevrolet	Wheelhouse Bicycle
54	Christopher Bell	Joe Gibbs Racing	Toyota	Reser's Fine Foods
61	David Starr	Hattori Racing Enterprises	Toyota	Whataburger
66	Jason White	MBM Motorsports	Ford	A-Game Energy "Bring it to life."
68	Brandon Brown	Brandonbilt Motorsports	Chevrolet	Larry's Hard Lemonade
74	Tim Viens	Mike Harmon Racing	Chevrolet	Barnes Law
77	Dillon Bassett	Bassett Racing	Chevrolet	
78	Mason Massey	B. J. McLeod Motorsports	Toyota	Brunt Workwear "The Tools You Wear."
90	Caesar Bacarella	DGM Racing	Chevrolet	Alpha Prime Regimen Primebites
92	Josh Williams	DGM Racing	Chevrolet	Alloy Employer Services "Stronger by design"
98	Riley Herbst	Stewart-Haas Racing	Ford	Monster Energy
99	Chase Briscoe	B. J. McLeod Motorsports	Ford	HaasTooling.com
Official entry list

== Qualifying ==
Qualifying was based on a metric qualifying system based on the previous race, the 2021 New Holland 250. As a result, A. J. Allmendinger of Kaulig Racing would win the pole.

Timmy Hill and Dillon Bassett would not have enough points based on the metric system to qualify for the race.

Pos.	#	Driver	Team	Make
1	16	A. J. Allmendinger	Kaulig Racing	Chevrolet
2	9	Noah Gragson	JR Motorsports	Chevrolet
3	19	Brandon Jones	Joe Gibbs Racing	Toyota
4	7	Justin Allgaier	JR Motorsports	Chevrolet
5	20	Harrison Burton	Joe Gibbs Racing	Toyota
6	98	Riley Herbst	Stewart-Haas Racing	Ford
7	02	Brett Moffitt	Our Motorsports	Chevrolet
8	51	Jeremy Clements	Jeremy Clements Racing	Chevrolet
9	11	Justin Haley	Kaulig Racing	Chevrolet
10	48	Jade Buford	Big Machine Racing Team	Chevrolet
11	39	Ryan Sieg	RSS Racing	Ford
12	44	Tommy Joe Martins	Martins Motorsports	Chevrolet
13	10	Jeb Burton	Kaulig Racing	Chevrolet
14	22	Austin Cindric	Team Penske	Ford
15	54	Christopher Bell	Joe Gibbs Racing	Toyota
16	5	Matt Mills	B. J. McLeod Motorsports	Toyota
17	92	Josh Williams	DGM Racing	Chevrolet
18	31	Jordan Anderson	Jordan Anderson Racing	Chevrolet
19	1	Michael Annett	JR Motorsports	Chevrolet
20	26	Colin Garrett	Sam Hunt Racing	Toyota
21	18	Daniel Hemric	Joe Gibbs Racing	Toyota
22	8	Sam Mayer	JR Motorsports	Chevrolet
23	2	Myatt Snider	Richard Childress Racing	Chevrolet
24	6	Ryan Vargas	JD Motorsports	Chevrolet
25	36	Alex Labbé	DGM Racing	Chevrolet
26	4	Landon Cassill	JD Motorsports	Chevrolet
27	0	Jeffrey Earnhardt	JD Motorsports	Chevrolet
28	47	Kyle Weatherman	Mike Harmon Racing	Chevrolet
29	23	Blaine Perkins	Our Motorsports	Chevrolet
30	78	Mason Massey	B. J. McLeod Motorsports	Toyota
31	68	Brandon Brown	Brandonbilt Motorsports	Chevrolet
32	61	David Starr	Hattori Racing Enterprises	Toyota
33	15	Colby Howard	JD Motorsports	Chevrolet
34	17	J. J. Yeley	SS-Green Light Racing with Rick Ware Racing	Chevrolet
35	66	Jason White	MBM Motorsports	Ford
36	90	Caesar Bacarella	DGM Racing	Chevrolet
37	99	Chase Briscoe	B. J. McLeod Motorsports	Ford
38	52	Spencer Boyd	Jimmy Means Racing	Chevrolet
39	07	Joe Graf Jr.	SS-Green Light Racing	Chevrolet
40	74	Tim Viens	Mike Harmon Racing	Chevrolet
Failed to qualify
41	13	Timmy Hill	DGM Racing	Toyota
42	77	Dillon Bassett	Bassett Racing	Chevrolet
Official starting lineup

== Race results ==
Stage 1 Laps: 30

Fin.	#	Driver	Team	Make	Pts
1	11	Justin Haley	Kaulig Racing	Chevrolet	10
2	16	A. J. Allmendinger	Kaulig Racing	Chevrolet	9
3	10	Jeb Burton	Kaulig Racing	Chevrolet	8
4	54	Christopher Bell	Joe Gibbs Racing	Toyota	0
5	7	Justin Allgaier	JR Motorsports	Chevrolet	6
6	02	Brett Moffitt	Our Motorsports	Chevrolet	5
7	9	Noah Gragson	JR Motorsports	Chevrolet	4
8	90	Caesar Bacarella	DGM Racing	Chevrolet	3
9	68	Brandon Brown	Brandonbilt Motorsports	Chevrolet	2
10	20	Harrison Burton	Joe Gibbs Racing	Toyota	1

Stage 2 Laps: 30

Fin.	#	Driver	Team	Make	Pts
1	10	Jeb Burton	Kaulig Racing	Chevrolet	10
2	16	A. J. Allmendinger	Kaulig Racing	Chevrolet	9
3	11	Justin Haley	Kaulig Racing	Chevrolet	8
4	98	Riley Herbst	Stewart-Haas Racing	Ford	7
5	54	Christopher Bell	Joe Gibbs Racing	Toyota	0
6	9	Noah Gragson	JR Motorsports	Chevrolet	5
7	18	Daniel Hemric	Joe Gibbs Racing	Toyota	4
8	7	Justin Allgaier	JR Motorsports	Chevrolet	3
9	99	Chase Briscoe	B. J. McLeod Motorsports	Ford	0
10	8	Sam Mayer	JR Motorsports	Chevrolet	1

Stage 3 Laps: 40

Fin.	St	#	Driver	Team	Make	Laps	Led	Status	Pts
1	9	11	Justin Haley	Kaulig Racing	Chevrolet	100	5	running	58
2	1	16	A. J. Allmendinger	Kaulig Racing	Chevrolet	100	29	running	53
3	4	7	Justin Allgaier	JR Motorsports	Chevrolet	100	0	running	43
4	13	10	Jeb Burton	Kaulig Racing	Chevrolet	100	8	running	51
5	21	18	Daniel Hemric	Joe Gibbs Racing	Toyota	100	0	running	36
6	15	54	Christopher Bell	Joe Gibbs Racing	Toyota	100	23	running	0
7	2	9	Noah Gragson	JR Motorsports	Chevrolet	100	16	running	39
8	23	2	Myatt Snider	Richard Childress Racing	Chevrolet	100	0	running	29
9	5	20	Harrison Burton	Joe Gibbs Racing	Toyota	100	0	running	29
10	6	98	Riley Herbst	Stewart-Haas Racing	Ford	100	9	running	34
11	7	02	Brett Moffitt	Our Motorsports	Chevrolet	100	0	running	31
12	22	8	Sam Mayer	JR Motorsports	Chevrolet	100	1	running	26
13	34	17	J. J. Yeley	SS-Green Light Racing with Rick Ware Racing	Chevrolet	100	0	running	24
14	32	61	David Starr	Hattori Racing Enterprises	Toyota	100	0	running	23
15	35	66	Jason White	MBM Motorsports	Ford	100	0	running	22
16	11	39	Ryan Sieg	RSS Racing	Ford	100	0	running	21
17	17	92	Josh Williams	DGM Racing	Chevrolet	100	0	running	20
18	12	44	Tommy Joe Martins	Martins Motorsports	Chevrolet	100	0	running	19
19	37	99	Chase Briscoe	B. J. McLeod Motorsports	Ford	100	0	running	0
20	27	0	Jeffrey Earnhardt	JD Motorsports	Chevrolet	100	0	running	17
21	26	4	Landon Cassill	JD Motorsports	Chevrolet	100	0	running	16
22	18	31	Jordan Anderson	Jordan Anderson Racing	Chevrolet	100	0	running	0
23	29	23	Blaine Perkins	Our Motorsports	Chevrolet	100	0	running	14
24	8	51	Jeremy Clements	Jeremy Clements Racing	Chevrolet	100	0	running	13
25	30	78	Mason Massey	B. J. McLeod Motorsports	Toyota	100	0	running	12
26	33	15	Colby Howard	JD Motorsports	Chevrolet	100	0	running	11
27	24	6	Ryan Vargas	JD Motorsports	Chevrolet	100	0	running	10
28	10	48	Jade Buford	Big Machine Racing Team	Chevrolet	100	0	running	9
29	40	74	Tim Viens	Mike Harmon Racing	Chevrolet	100	0	running	0
30	19	1	Michael Annett	JR Motorsports	Chevrolet	100	0	running	7
31	25	36	Alex Labbé	DGM Racing	Chevrolet	100	0	running	6
32	28	47	Kyle Weatherman	Mike Harmon Racing	Chevrolet	98	0	running	5
33	16	5	Matt Mills	B. J. McLeod Motorsports	Toyota	98	0	running	4
34	31	68	Brandon Brown	Brandonbilt Motorsports	Chevrolet	97	9	running	5
35	39	07	Joe Graf Jr.	SS-Green Light Racing	Chevrolet	88	0	accident	2
36	36	90	Caesar Bacarella	DGM Racing	Chevrolet	82	0	accident	4
37	20	26	Colin Garrett	Sam Hunt Racing	Toyota	71	0	accident	1
38	38	52	Spencer Boyd	Jimmy Means Racing	Chevrolet	71	0	engine	0
39	14	22	Austin Cindric	Team Penske	Ford	27	0	accident	1
40	3	19	Brandon Jones	Joe Gibbs Racing	Toyota	17	0	engine	1
Failed to qualify
41		13	Timmy Hill	DGM Racing	Toyota				
42		77	Dillon Bassett	Bassett Racing	Chevrolet				
Official race results

Previous race: 2021 New Holland 250	NASCAR Xfinity Series; 2021 season	Next race: 2021 Sport Clips Haircuts VFW 200
