= Colin Garrett =

American racing driver (born 2000)

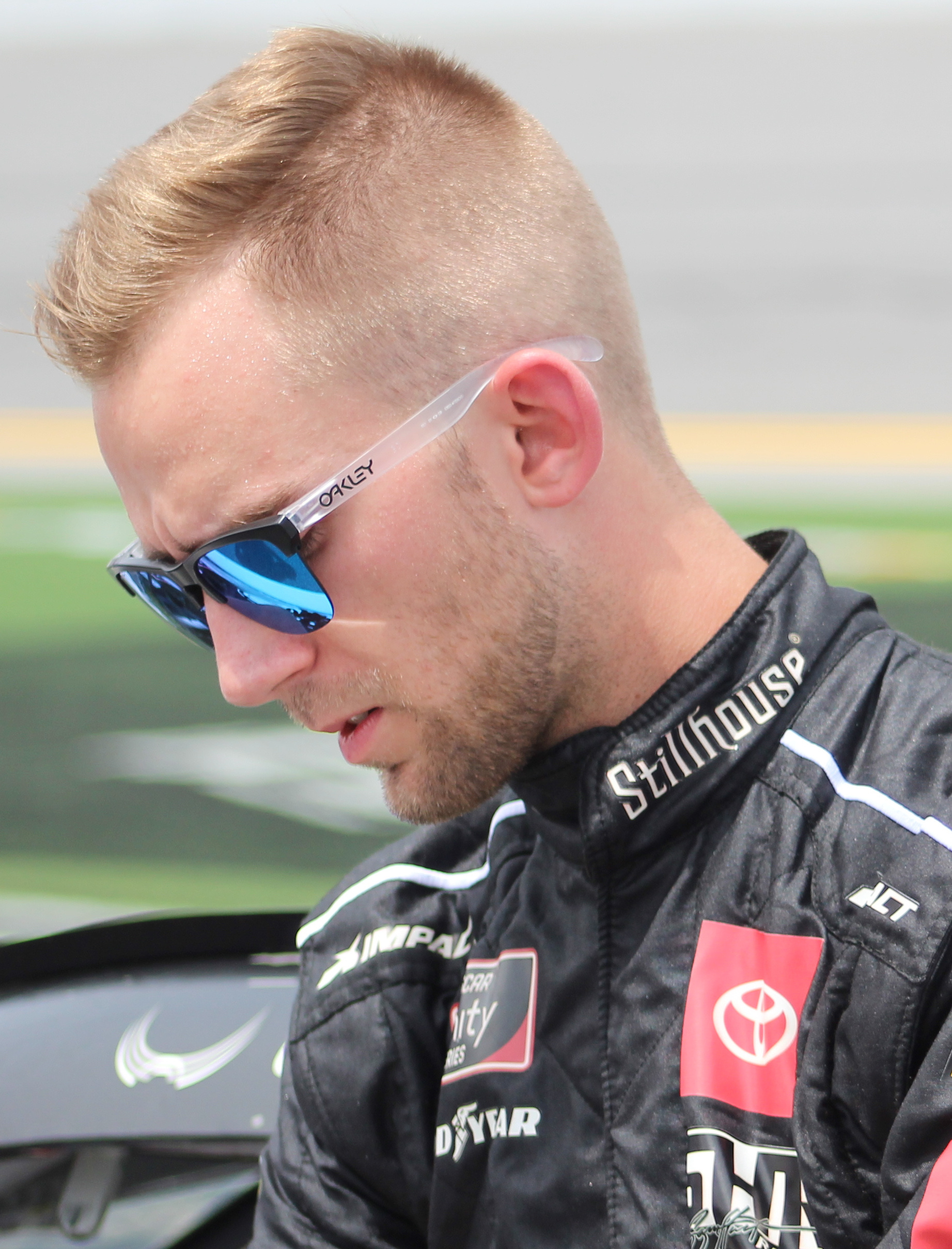
- Garrett at Daytona International Speedway in 2021
- Born: Colin Kaywood Garrett; July 6, 2000 (age 26) South Boston, Virginia, U.S.

NASCAR K&N Pro Series East career
- Debut season: 2018
- Car number: 18
- Former teams: Hunt-Sellers Racing; Sam Hunt Racing
- Starts: 22
- Championships: 0
- Wins: 0
- Poles: 0
- Best finish: 8th in 2019
- Finished last season: 8th (2019)

Previous series
- 2018–2019 2018: CARS Pro Late Model Tour; CARS Late Model Stock Tour

NASCAR O'Reilly Auto Parts Series career
- 12 races run over 3 years
- 2021 position: 43rd
- Best finish: 43rd (2021)
- First race: 2019 ToyotaCare 250 (Richmond)
- Last race: 2021 Dead On Tools 250 (Martinsville)
Wins	Top tens	Poles
0	0	0

NASCAR FedEx Freight Truck Series career
- 2 races run over 2 years
- 2023 position: 64th
- Best finish: 64th (2023)
- First race: 2019 World of Westgate 200 (Las Vegas)
- Last race: 2023 XPEL 225 (Austin)
Wins	Top tens	Poles
0	0	0
- Statistics up to date as of August 9, 2023.

Colin Kaywood Garrett (born July 6, 2000) is an American professional racing driver who last competed part-time in the NASCAR Xfinity Series, driving the No. 07 Chevrolet Camaro for SS-Green Light Racing, as well as in the TC America Series in TCX for Rooster Hall Racing in a BMW M2 CS Cup car. He has also competed in the NASCAR Truck Series, NASCAR K&N Pro Series East (now the ARCA Menards Series East) and the CARS Tour in the past.

== Racing career ==
=== NASCAR ===
Garrett began racing in 2015 at the age of fourteen, competing in the Pure Stock division at South Boston Speedway. He was awarded the UNOH Youth Achievement Award in 2016 and 2017 at SoBo and in 2017 won the NASCAR Whelen All-American Series Limited Late Model division championship at SoBo. In 2017, he also competed in select Late Model Stock Car events at numerous tracks, earning two pole awards and a win at Dominion Raceway.

==== K&N Pro Series East ====
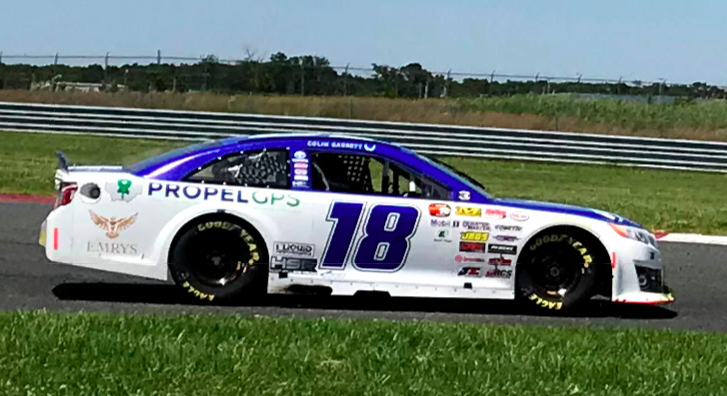
Garrett's No. 18 East Series car at New Jersey Motorsports Park in 2018

Garrett ran twelve of the fourteen races in 2018, driving the No. 18 Toyota for Hunt-Sellers Racing. His highest finish was third in the season’s fourth race at South Boston Speedway. The team ran a Days of Thunder throwback scheme for the King Cadillac GMC Throwback 100 at Thompson Speedway Motorsports Park, imitating Russ Wheeler's paint scheme. Garrett's 2018 season was originally supposed to be a part-time effort with sporadic races throughout the year, but eventually expanded to include all of the races from Langley on forward.

In 2019, Garrett returned to Sam Hunt Racing and the No. 18, but switched from Toyota to Chevrolet. They competed in ten of twelve events with a best finish of sixth.

==== Xfinity Series ====
In April 2019, Garrett made his debut in the NASCAR Xfinity Series. He drove the No. 66 Toyota for MBM Motorsports at Richmond Raceway. They started 24th and finished 26th, three laps down.

For the 2019 NASCAR Xfinity Series finale at Homestead-Miami Speedway, Garrett and Sam Hunt Racing made their first start together in the series. They started fifteenth and finished 21st, one lap down.

Garrett would go on to drive part-time for Sam Hunt Racing in the Xfinity Series in 2020 and 2021.

Garrett returned to the Xfinity Series in 2023, replacing Katherine Legge in the SS-Green Light Racing No. 07 car in the race at the Indianapolis road course after Legge's sponsor, Blast Equality Collab, did not want to be on the car due to their members' connection with the writers' strike going on at the time.

==== Truck Series ====
Garrett ran his first NASCAR Gander Outdoors Truck Series race in the 2019 World of Westgate 200 at Las Vegas Motor Speedway, driving the No. 38 Chevrolet for Niece Motorsports starting 21st and finishing 24th, three laps down, due to transmission issues.

Garrett returned to Niece and the Truck Series in October 2020 at Kansas Speedway starting twentieth and finishing 24th, four laps down, after being involved in an early crash.

On June 8, 2022, it was announced that Garrett would drive the No. 30 truck for On Point Motorsports in the DoorDash 250 at Sonoma, replacing Tate Fogleman, who had been scheduled to drive that truck full-time in 2022 but was taken out of the truck for this race. However, due to the late notice of this opportunity, Garrett was unable to receive his drug test back in time to be able to compete. Josh Bilicki filled in starting 26th and finishing 30th due to a crash.

=== Touring Cars ===
==== TC America ====
Garrett transitioned to sports car racing in 2022 with the move to TC America in the TCX class. There he would win in his third start and finish on the podium eleven out of fourteen races with seven wins. He finished second in the championship after coming back from a 59-point deficit winning, four races in a row, and would ultimately lose the championship by two points in Indianapolis.

In 2023, it was announced Garrett would return to Rooster Hall Racing for TC America in TCX. He would go on to win the season opener at Sonoma Raceway and take the points lead, leading it for the remainder of the year. Along with thirteen podiums and six wins out of fourteen races, he would win the 2023 TCX Championship.

=== Grand Touring ===
==== GT4 America ====
After a successful season in TC America in 2022, Rooster Hall Racing made the decision to bring Garrett aboard the GT4 program alongside 3x Guinness Book of World Records holder Johan Schwartz for 2023. The duo would go on to finish on the podium twice during the 2023 season in their BMW M4 GT4.

== Motorsports career results ==
=== NASCAR ===
(key) (Bold – Pole position awarded by qualifying time. Italics – Pole position earned by points standings or practice time. * – Most laps led.)

==== Xfinity Series ====
NASCAR Xfinity Series results
Year	Team	No.	Make	1	2	3	4	5	6	7	8	9	10	11	12	13	14	15	16	17	18	19	20	21	22	23	24	25	26	27	28	29	30	31	32	33	NXSC	Pts	Ref
2019	MBM Motorsports	66	Toyota	DAY	ATL	LVS	PHO	CAL	TEX	BRI	RCH; 26	TAL	DOV	CLT	POC	MCH	IOW	CHI	DAY	KEN	NHA	IOW	GLN	MOH	BRI	ROA	DAR	IND	LVS	RCH	CLT	DOV	KAN	TEX	PHO		63rd	27	
2019	Sam Hunt Racing	26	Toyota																																	HOM; 21	63rd	27	
2020	Sam Hunt Racing	26	Toyota	DAY; DNQ	LVS	CAL	PHO	DAR; 37	CLT	BRI	ATL	HOM; 21	HOM; 14	TAL; 35	POC	IND	KEN	KEN	KAN; 16	TEX	ROA	DAY	DOV	DOV	DAY	DAR	RCH	RCH	BRI	LVS	TAL	CLT	KAN	TEX	MAR	PHO	48th	63	
2021	Sam Hunt Racing	26	Toyota	DAY	DRC	HOM	LVS	PHO	ATL	MAR	TAL; 15	DAR	DOV	COA	CLT	MOH	TEX	NSH	POC	ROA	ATL	NHA	GLN	IND	MCH; 20	DAY; 37	DAR; 17	RCH	BRI	LVS	TAL	CLT	TEX	KAN	MAR; 14	PHO	43rd	83	
2023	SS-Green Light Racing	07	Chevy	DAY	CAL	LVS	PHO	ATL	COA	RCH	MAR	TAL	DOV	DAR	CLT	POR	SON	NSH	CSC	ATL	NHA	POC	ROA	MCH	IND; DNQ	GLN	DAY	DAR	KAN	BRI	TEX	CLT	LVS	HOM	MAR	PHO	N/A	0	

==== Craftsman Truck Series ====
NASCAR Craftsman Truck Series results
Year	Team	No.	Make	1	2	3	4	5	6	7	8	9	10	11	12	13	14	15	16	17	18	19	20	21	22	23	NCTC	Pts	Ref
2019	Niece Motorsports	38	Chevy	DAY	ATL	LVS	MAR	TEX	DOV	KAN	CLT	TEX	IOW	GTW	CHI	KEN	POC	ELD	MCH	BRI	MSP	LVS; 21	TAL	MAR	PHO	HOM	106th	0^{1}	
2020	Niece Motorsports	44	Chevy	DAY	LVS	CLT	ATL	HOM	POC	KEN	TEX	KAN	KAN	MCH	DAY	DOV	GTW	DAR	RCH	BRI	LVS	TAL	KAN; 24	TEX	MAR	PHO	92nd	0^{1}	
2023	On Point Motorsports	30	Toyota	DAY	LVS	ATL	COA; 20	TEX	BRI	MAR	KAN	DAR	NWS	CLT	GTW	NSH	MOH	POC	RCH	IRP	MLW	KAN	BRI	TAL	HOM	PHO	64th	17	

==== K&N Pro Series East ====
NASCAR K&N Pro Series East results
Year	Team	No.	Make	1	2	3	4	5	6	7	8	9	10	11	12	13	14	NKNPSEC	Pts	Ref
2018	Hunt-Sellers Racing	18	Toyota	NSM	BRI	LGY; 6	SBO; 3	SBO; 16	MEM; 8	NJE; 8	TMP; 13	NHA; 13	IOW; 23	GLN; 22	GTW; 15	NHA; 7	DOV; 17	10th	377	
2019	Sam Hunt Racing	18	Chevy	NSM; 6*	BRI; 7	SBO; 6	SBO; 14	MEM; 11	NHA; 9	IOW; 13	GLN; 10	BRI; 15	GTW; 8	NHA	DOV			8th	344	
2019	Rev Racing	6	Toyota				SBO; RL^{†}											8th	344	
^{†} – Relieved Ruben Garcia Jr.

=== CARS Late Model Stock Car Tour ===
(key) (Bold – Pole position awarded by qualifying time. Italics – Pole position earned by points standings or practice time. * – Most laps led. ** – All laps led.)

CARS Late Model Stock Car Tour results
Year	Team	No.	Make	1	2	3	4	5	6	7	8	9	10	11	12	CLMSCTC	Pts	Ref
2018	Jill Garrett	24G	Toyota	TCM	MYB	ROU	HCY	BRI	ACE	CCS	KPT	HCY	WKS	OCS	SBO; 21	72nd	12	

=== CARS Super Late Model Tour ===
(key)

CARS Super Late Model Tour results
Year	Team	No.	Make	1	2	3	4	5	6	7	8	9	CSLMTC	Pts	Ref
2018	Jamie Yelton	24	Toyota	MYB	NSH	ROU	HCY	BRI	AND	HCY	ROU	SBO; 17	46th	16	
2019	Jamie Yelton	24	Chevy	SNM; 19	HCY	NSH	MMS; 8	BRI	HCY	ROU	SBO; 8		17th	64	

^{*} Season still in progress
^{1} Ineligible for series points
