= 2021 New Holland 250 =

Race details
- Race 22 of 33 of the 2021 NASCAR Xfinity Series
- Date: August 21, 2021
- Official name: New Holland 250
- Location: Brooklyn, Michigan, Michigan International Speedway
- Course: Permanent racing facility
- Course length: 2 miles (3.219 km)
- Distance: 139 laps, 278 mi (447.398 km)
- Scheduled distance: 125 laps, 250 mi (402.336 km)
- Average speed: 115.619 miles per hour (186.071 km/h)

Pole position
| Driver | Austin Cindric | Team Penske |
- Grid positions set by competition-based formula

Most laps led
| Driver | A. J. Allmendinger | Kaulig Racing |
- Laps: 70

Winner
| No. 16 | A. J. Allmendinger | Kaulig Racing |

Television in the United States
- Network: NBCSN
- Announcers: Rick Allen, Jeff Burton, Dale Earnhardt Jr., Steve Letarte

Radio in the United States
- Radio: Motor Racing Network

The 2021 New Holland 250 was the 22nd stock car race of the 2021 NASCAR Xfinity Series season, and the 29th iteration of the event. The race was held on Saturday, August 21, 2021 in Brooklyn, Michigan at Michigan International Speedway, a 2 miles (3.2 km) D-shaped oval. The race was extended from its scheduled 125 laps to 139, after three green–white–checkered finish attempts. A. J. Allmendinger would survive the chaotic race and win, his third of the year and his 8th overall career win in the NASCAR Xfinity Series. Brandon Jones of Joe Gibbs Racing and Noah Gragson of JR Motorsports would score the rest of the podium positions, finishing 2nd and 3rd, respectively.

== Background ==
The layout of Michigan International Speedway, the venue where the race was held.

The race was held at Michigan International Speedway, a two-mile (3.2 km) moderate-banked D-shaped speedway located in Brooklyn, Michigan. The track is used primarily for NASCAR events. It is known as a "sister track" to Texas World Speedway as MIS's oval design was a direct basis of TWS, with moderate modifications to the banking in the corners, and was used as the basis of Auto Club Speedway. The track is owned by International Speedway Corporation. Michigan International Speedway is recognized as one of motorsports' premier facilities because of its wide racing surface and high banking (by open-wheel standards; the 18-degree banking is modest by stock car standards).

=== Entry list ===
| # | Driver | Team | Make |
|---|---|---|---|
| 0 | Jeffrey Earnhardt | JD Motorsports | Chevrolet |
| 1 | Michael Annett | JR Motorsports | Chevrolet |
| 2 | Myatt Snider | Richard Childress Racing | Chevrolet |
| 02 | Brett Moffitt | Our Motorsports | Chevrolet |
| 4 | Landon Cassill | JD Motorsports | Chevrolet |
| 5 | Matt Mills | B. J. McLeod Motorsports | Chevrolet |
| 6 | Ryan Vargas | JD Motorsports | Chevrolet |
| 7 | Justin Allgaier | JR Motorsports | Chevrolet |
| 07 | Joe Graf Jr. | SS-Green Light Racing | Chevrolet |
| 8 | Sam Mayer | JR Motorsports | Chevrolet |
| 9 | Noah Gragson | JR Motorsports | Chevrolet |
| 10 | Jeb Burton | Kaulig Racing | Chevrolet |
| 11 | Justin Haley | Kaulig Racing | Chevrolet |
| 13 | Timmy Hill | MBM Motorsports | Toyota |
| 15 | Colby Howard | JD Motorsports | Chevrolet |
| 16 | A. J. Allmendinger | Kaulig Racing | Chevrolet |
| 17 | Carson Ware | SS-Green Light Racing with Rick Ware Racing | Chevrolet |
| 18 | Daniel Hemric | Joe Gibbs Racing | Toyota |
| 19 | Brandon Jones | Joe Gibbs Racing | Toyota |
| 20 | Harrison Burton | Joe Gibbs Racing | Toyota |
| 22 | Austin Cindric | Team Penske | Ford |
| 23 | Tyler Reddick | Our Motorsports | Chevrolet |
| 26 | Colin Garrett | Sam Hunt Racing | Toyota |
| 31 | Jordan Anderson | Jordan Anderson Racing | Chevrolet |
| 36 | Alex Labbé | DGM Racing | Chevrolet |
| 39 | Ryan Sieg | RSS Racing | Ford |
| 44 | Tommy Joe Martins | Martins Motorsports | Chevrolet |
| 47 | Kyle Weatherman | Mike Harmon Racing | Chevrolet |
| 48 | Jade Buford | Big Machine Racing Team | Chevrolet |
| 51 | Jeremy Clements | Jeremy Clements Racing | Chevrolet |
| 52 | Gray Gaulding | Jimmy Means Racing | Chevrolet |
| 54 | Ty Gibbs | Joe Gibbs Racing | Toyota |
| 61 | Bubba Wallace | Hattori Racing Enterprises | Toyota |
| 66 | David Starr | MBM Motorsports | Toyota |
| 68 | Brandon Brown | Brandonbilt Motorsports | Chevrolet |
| 74 | Bayley Currey | Mike Harmon Racing | Chevrolet |
| 78 | Mason Massey | B. J. McLeod Motorsports | Toyota |
| 90 | Caesar Bacarella | DGM Racing | Chevrolet |
| 92 | Josh Williams | DGM Racing | Chevrolet |
| 98 | Riley Herbst | Stewart-Haas Racing | Ford |
| 99 | Jesse Little | B. J. McLeod Motorsports | Toyota |
Official entry list

== Starting lineup ==
The starting lineup was based on metric qualifying from the previous race, the 2021 Pennzoil 150. As a result, Austin Cindric of Team Penske would win the pole.

| Pos. | # | Driver | Team | Make |
|---|---|---|---|---|
| 1 | 22 | Austin Cindric | Team Penske | Ford |
| 2 | 16 | A. J. Allmendinger | Kaulig Racing | Chevrolet |
| 3 | 11 | Justin Haley | Kaulig Racing | Chevrolet |
| 4 | 9 | Noah Gragson | JR Motorsports | Chevrolet |
| 5 | 7 | Justin Allgaier | JR Motorsports | Chevrolet |
| 6 | 20 | Harrison Burton | Joe Gibbs Racing | Toyota |
| 7 | 18 | Daniel Hemric | Joe Gibbs Racing | Toyota |
| 8 | 98 | Riley Herbst | Stewart-Haas Racing | Ford |
| 9 | 2 | Myatt Snider | Richard Childress Racing | Chevrolet |
| 10 | 54 | Ty Gibbs | Joe Gibbs Racing | Toyota |
| 11 | 51 | Jeremy Clements | Jeremy Clements Racing | Chevrolet |
| 12 | 10 | Jeb Burton | Kaulig Racing | Chevrolet |
| 13 | 36 | Alex Labbé | DGM Racing | Chevrolet |
| 14 | 92 | Josh Williams | DGM Racing | Chevrolet |
| 15 | 4 | Landon Cassill | JD Motorsports | Chevrolet |
| 16 | 8 | Sam Mayer | JR Motorsports | Chevrolet |
| 17 | 1 | Josh Berry | JR Motorsports | Chevrolet |
| 18 | 44 | Tommy Joe Martins | Martins Motorsports | Chevrolet |
| 19 | 48 | Jade Buford | Big Machine Racing Team | Chevrolet |
| 20 | 02 | Brett Moffitt | Our Motorsports | Chevrolet |
| 21 | 47 | Kyle Weatherman | Mike Harmon Racing | Chevrolet |
| 22 | 23 | Tyler Reddick | Our Motorsports | Chevrolet |
| 23 | 39 | Ryan Sieg | RSS Racing | Ford |
| 24 | 19 | Brandon Jones | Joe Gibbs Racing | Toyota |
| 25 | 68 | Brandon Brown | Brandonbilt Motorsports | Chevrolet |
| 26 | 78 | Mason Massey | B. J. McLeod Motorsports | Toyota |
| 27 | 5 | Matt Mills | B. J. McLeod Motorsports | Chevrolet |
| 28 | 17 | Carson Ware | SS-Green Light Racing with Rick Ware Racing | Chevrolet |
| 29 | 26 | Colin Garrett | Sam Hunt Racing | Toyota |
| 30 | 0 | Jeffrey Earnhardt | JD Motorsports | Chevrolet |
| 31 | 31 | Jordan Anderson | Jordan Anderson Racing | Chevrolet |
| 32 | 07 | Joe Graf Jr. | SS-Green Light Racing | Chevrolet |
| 33 | 99 | Jesse Little | B. J. McLeod Motorsports | Toyota |
| 34 | 90 | Caesar Bacarella | DGM Racing | Chevrolet |
| 35 | 6 | Ryan Vargas | JD Motorsports | Chevrolet |
| 36 | 61 | Bubba Wallace | Hattori Racing Enterprises | Toyota |
| 37 | 66 | David Starr | MBM Motorsports | Toyota |
| 38 | 15 | Colby Howard | JD Motorsports | Chevrolet |
| 39 | 74 | Bayley Currey | Mike Harmon Racing | Chevrolet |
| 40 | 52 | Gray Gaulding | Jimmy Means Racing | Chevrolet |
Failed to qualify
| 41 | 13 | Timmy Hill | MBM Motorsports | Toyota |
Official starting lineup

== Race results ==
| Fin | St | # | Driver | Team | Make | Laps | Led | Status | Pts |
|---|---|---|---|---|---|---|---|---|---|
| 1 | 2 | 16 | A. J. Allmendinger | Kaulig Racing | Chevrolet | 139 | 70 | running | 58 |
| 2 | 24 | 19 | Brandon Jones | Joe Gibbs Racing | Toyota | 139 | 0 | running | 42 |
| 3 | 4 | 9 | Noah Gragson | JR Motorsports | Chevrolet | 139 | 0 | running | 45 |
| 4 | 17 | 1 | Josh Berry | JR Motorsports | Chevrolet | 139 | 24 | running | 38 |
| 5 | 6 | 20 | Harrison Burton | Joe Gibbs Racing | Toyota | 139 | 0 | running | 44 |
| 6 | 5 | 7 | Justin Allgaier | JR Motorsports | Chevrolet | 139 | 9 | running | 38 |
| 7 | 8 | 98 | Riley Herbst | Stewart-Haas Racing | Ford | 139 | 0 | running | 31 |
| 8 | 20 | 02 | Brett Moffitt | Our Motorsports | Chevrolet | 139 | 0 | running | 31 |
| 9 | 19 | 48 | Jade Buford | Big Machine Racing Team | Chevrolet | 139 | 0 | running | 28 |
| 10 | 36 | 61 | Bubba Wallace | Hattori Racing Enterprises | Toyota | 139 | 0 | running | 0 |
| 11 | 11 | 51 | Jeremy Clements | Jeremy Clements Racing | Chevrolet | 139 | 0 | running | 26 |
| 12 | 23 | 39 | Ryan Sieg | RSS Racing | Ford | 139 | 0 | running | 25 |
| 13 | 10 | 54 | Ty Gibbs | Joe Gibbs Racing | Toyota | 139 | 1 | running | 42 |
| 14 | 27 | 5 | Matt Mills | B. J. McLeod Motorsports | Chevrolet | 139 | 0 | running | 23 |
| 15 | 31 | 31 | Jordan Anderson | Jordan Anderson Racing | Chevrolet | 138 | 0 | running | 0 |
| 16 | 22 | 23 | Tyler Reddick | Our Motorsports | Chevrolet | 138 | 0 | running | 0 |
| 17 | 3 | 11 | Justin Haley | Kaulig Racing | Chevrolet | 138 | 0 | running | 21 |
| 18 | 14 | 92 | Josh Williams | DGM Racing | Chevrolet | 138 | 0 | running | 19 |
| 19 | 18 | 44 | Tommy Joe Martins | Martins Motorsports | Chevrolet | 138 | 0 | running | 18 |
| 20 | 29 | 26 | Colin Garrett | Sam Hunt Racing | Toyota | 138 | 0 | running | 17 |
| 21 | 35 | 6 | Ryan Vargas | JD Motorsports | Chevrolet | 138 | 0 | running | 16 |
| 22 | 37 | 66 | David Starr | MBM Motorsports | Toyota | 137 | 0 | running | 15 |
| 23 | 30 | 0 | Jeffrey Earnhardt | JD Motorsports | Chevrolet | 137 | 0 | running | 14 |
| 24 | 21 | 47 | Kyle Weatherman | Mike Harmon Racing | Chevrolet | 137 | 0 | running | 13 |
| 25 | 38 | 15 | Colby Howard | JD Motorsports | Chevrolet | 137 | 0 | running | 12 |
| 26 | 15 | 4 | Landon Cassill | JD Motorsports | Chevrolet | 137 | 0 | running | 11 |
| 27 | 40 | 52 | Gray Gaulding | Jimmy Means Racing | Chevrolet | 137 | 0 | running | 10 |
| 28 | 28 | 17 | Carson Ware | SS-Green Light Racing with Rick Ware Racing | Chevrolet | 136 | 0 | running | 9 |
| 29 | 12 | 10 | Jeb Burton | Kaulig Racing | Chevrolet | 135 | 23 | running | 14 |
| 30 | 26 | 78 | Mason Massey | B. J. McLeod Motorsports | Toyota | 125 | 0 | accident | 7 |
| 31 | 13 | 36 | Alex Labbé | DGM Racing | Chevrolet | 123 | 0 | running | 6 |
| 32 | 33 | 99 | Jesse Little | B. J. McLeod Motorsports | Toyota | 120 | 0 | accident | 5 |
| 33 | 16 | 8 | Sam Mayer | JR Motorsports | Chevrolet | 114 | 0 | running | 4 |
| 34 | 39 | 74 | Bayley Currey | Mike Harmon Racing | Chevrolet | 103 | 0 | accident | 0 |
| 35 | 34 | 90 | Caesar Bacarella | DGM Racing | Chevrolet | 45 | 0 | dvp | 2 |
| 36 | 9 | 2 | Myatt Snider | Richard Childress Racing | Chevrolet | 45 | 0 | dvp | 8 |
| 37 | 1 | 22 | Austin Cindric | Team Penske | Ford | 41 | 12 | dvp | 11 |
| 38 | 32 | 07 | Joe Graf Jr. | SS-Green Light Racing | Chevrolet | 37 | 0 | dvp | 1 |
| 39 | 7 | 18 | Daniel Hemric | Joe Gibbs Racing | Toyota | 36 | 0 | accident | 6 |
| 40 | 25 | 68 | Brandon Brown | Brandonbilt Motorsports | Chevrolet | 35 | 0 | accident | 1 |
Failed to qualify
| 41 | | 13 | Timmy Hill | MBM Motorsports | Toyota | | | | |
Official race results

| Previous race: 2021 Pennzoil 150 | NASCAR Xfinity Series; 2021 season | Next race: 2021 Wawa 250 |
