= 2021 Sport Clips Haircuts VFW 200 =

Race details
- Race 24 of 33 of the 2021 NASCAR Xfinity Series
- Date: September 4, 2021
- Official name: Sport Clips Haircuts VFW 200
- Location: Darlington, South Carolina, Darlington Raceway
- Course: Permanent racing facility
- Course length: 1.366 miles (2.198 km)
- Distance: 152 laps, 207.632 mi (334.096 km)
- Scheduled distance: 147 laps, 200.802 mi (323.159 km)
- Average speed: 102.422 miles per hour (164.832 km/h)

Pole position
Driver	Daniel Hemric	Joe Gibbs Racing
- Grid positions set by competition-based formula

Most laps led
Driver	Denny Hamlin	Joe Gibbs Racing
- Laps: 43

Winner
No. 9	Noah Gragson	JR Motorsports

Television in the United States
- Network: NBCSN
- Announcers: Rick Allen, Jeff Burton, Ricky Carmichael, Steve Letarte

Radio in the United States
- Radio: Motor Racing Network

The 2021 Sport Clips Haircuts VFW 200 was the 24th stock car race of the 2021 NASCAR Xfinity Series and the 29th iteration of the event. The race was held on September 4, 2021 in Darlington, South Carolina at Darlington Raceway, a 1.366 miles (2.198 km) permanent egg-shaped oval racetrack. The race was extended from its scheduled 147 laps to 152 due to a NASCAR overtime finish. Noah Gragson would be able to hold off the field on the final restart and win the race, his first of the year, fourth of his career, and breaking a 49-race winless streak. Harrison Burton of Joe Gibbs Racing and Austin Cindric of Team Penske would fill out the podium, finishing 2nd and 3rd respectively.

== Background ==
The venue of Darlington Raceway, the venue where the race was held.

Darlington Raceway is a race track built for NASCAR racing located near Darlington, South Carolina. It is nicknamed "The Lady in Black" and "The Track Too Tough to Tame" by many NASCAR fans and drivers and advertised as "A NASCAR Tradition." It is of a unique, somewhat egg-shaped design, an oval with the ends of very different configurations, a condition which supposedly arose from the proximity of one end of the track to a minnow pond the owner refused to relocate. This situation makes it very challenging for the crews to set up their cars' handling in a way that is effective at both ends.

=== Entry list ===
#	Driver	Team	Make	Sponsor
0	Jeffrey Earnhardt	JD Motorsports	Chevrolet	KDST CPA, Local Boy Outfitters
1	Michael Annett	JR Motorsports	Chevrolet	Pilot Flying J "If You've Got It A Trucker Brought It"
2	Myatt Snider	Richard Childress Racing	Chevrolet	Crosley Brands
02	Ty Dillon	Our Motorsports	Chevrolet	Fr8Auctions Tiny Lund 1964 Throwback
4	Landon Cassill	JD Motorsports	Chevrolet	Voyager
5	Matt Mills	B. J. McLeod Motorsports	Chevrolet	J. F. Electric
6	Ryan Vargas	JD Motorsports	Chevrolet	Monarch Roofing
7	Justin Allgaier	JR Motorsports	Chevrolet	Breyers
07	Joe Graf Jr.	SS-Green Light Racing	Chevrolet	Bucked Up Energy
8	Sam Mayer	JR Motorsports	Chevrolet	QPS Employment Group
9	Noah Gragson	JR Motorsports	Chevrolet	Bass Pro Shops, Black Rifle Coffee Company
10	Jeb Burton	Kaulig Racing	Chevrolet	Dyna-Gro Seed
11	Justin Haley	Kaulig Racing	Chevrolet	LeafFilter Gutter Protection
13	Chad Finchum	MBM Motorsports	Toyota	
15	Colby Howard	JD Motorsports	Chevrolet	Project Hope Foundation
16	A. J. Allmendinger	Kaulig Racing	Chevrolet	Hyperice
17	Mason Massey	SS-Green Light Racing with Rick Ware Racing	Chevrolet	Gerber Collision & Glass, Anderson Power Services
18	Daniel Hemric	Joe Gibbs Racing	Toyota	Poppy Bank
19	Brandon Jones	Joe Gibbs Racing	Toyota	Menards, Bali Blinds "Your Home, Your Style"
20	Harrison Burton	Joe Gibbs Racing	Toyota	DEX Imaging
22	Austin Cindric	Team Penske	Ford	Snap-on "Makers & Fixers"
23	Tyler Reddick	Our Motorsports	Chevrolet	Acme-Shorey Precast Concrete Products, Robert B. Our Co.
26	Colin Garrett	Sam Hunt Racing	Toyota	Mohawk Matt
31	Austin Dillon	Jordan Anderson Racing	Chevrolet	Swann Security
36	Alex Labbé	DGM Racing	Chevrolet	Globocam, Workpro Tools
39	Ryan Sieg	RSS Racing	Ford	CMR Construction & Roofing
44	Tommy Joe Martins	Martins Motorsports	Chevrolet	Capital City Hauling
47	Kyle Weatherman	Mike Harmon Racing	Chevrolet	Big Frig, National Wild Turkey Federation
48	Jade Buford	Big Machine Racing Team	Chevrolet	Big Machine Vodka Spiked Cooler
51	Jeremy Clements	Jeremy Clements Racing	Chevrolet	R. E. Goodson Construction, Fox Sports 98.3 Spartanburg
52	Gray Gaulding	Jimmy Means Racing	Chevrolet	Panini America
54	Denny Hamlin	Joe Gibbs Racing	Toyota	Sport Clips Haircuts
61	David Starr	Hattori Racing Enterprises	Toyota	Whataburger
66	Timmy Hill	MBM Motorsports	Ford	Coble Enterprises, James Carter Attorney at Law
68	Brandon Brown	Brandonbilt Motorsports	Chevrolet	Trade The Chain
74	Carson Ware	Mike Harmon Racing	Chevrolet	Jacob Companies
78	Jesse Little	B. J. McLeod Motorsports	Chevrolet	Shriners Hospitals for Children
90	B. J. McLeod	DGM Racing	Chevrolet	DGM Racing
92	Josh Williams	DGM Racing	Chevrolet	Workpro Tools
98	Riley Herbst	Stewart-Haas Racing	Ford	Monster Energy
99	Ryan Ellis	B. J. McLeod Motorsports	Ford	CorvetteParts.net, Keen Parts
Official entry list

== Starting lineup ==
Qualifying was determined by a qualifying metric system based on the previous race, the 2021 Wawa 250 and owner's points. As a result, Daniel Hemric of Joe Gibbs Racing would win the pole.

Pos.	#	Driver	Team	Make
1	18	Daniel Hemric	Joe Gibbs Racing	Toyota
2	16	A. J. Allmendinger	Kaulig Racing	Chevrolet
3	11	Justin Haley	Kaulig Racing	Chevrolet
4	7	Justin Allgaier	JR Motorsports	Chevrolet
5	10	Jeb Burton	Kaulig Racing	Chevrolet
6	20	Harrison Burton	Joe Gibbs Racing	Toyota
7	98	Riley Herbst	Stewart-Haas Racing	Ford
8	9	Noah Gragson	JR Motorsports	Chevrolet
9	2	Myatt Snider	Richard Childress Racing	Chevrolet
10	02	Ty Dillon	Our Motorsports	Chevrolet
11	8	Sam Mayer	JR Motorsports	Chevrolet
12	39	Ryan Sieg	RSS Racing	Ford
13	44	Tommy Joe Martins	Martins Motorsports	Chevrolet
14	54	Denny Hamlin	Joe Gibbs Racing	Toyota
15	51	Jeremy Clements	Jeremy Clements Racing	Chevrolet
16	92	Josh Williams	DGM Racing	Chevrolet
17	4	Landon Cassill	JD Motorsports	Chevrolet
18	61	David Starr	Hattori Racing Enterprises	Toyota
19	1	Michael Annett	JR Motorsports	Chevrolet
20	48	Jade Buford	Big Machine Racing Team	Chevrolet
21	0	Jeffrey Earnhardt	JD Motorsports	Chevrolet
22	36	Alex Labbé	DGM Racing	Chevrolet
23	68	Brandon Brown	Brandonbilt Motorsports	Chevrolet
24	22	Austin Cindric	Team Penske	Ford
25	19	Brandon Jones	Joe Gibbs Racing	Toyota
26	17	Mason Massey	SS-Green Light Racing with Rick Ware Racing	Chevrolet
27	6	Ryan Vargas	JD Motorsports	Chevrolet
28	23	Tyler Reddick	Our Motorsports	Chevrolet
29	66	Timmy Hill	MBM Motorsports	Ford
30	15	Colby Howard	JD Motorsports	Chevrolet
31	26	Colin Garrett	Sam Hunt Racing	Toyota
32	07	Joe Graf Jr.	SS-Green Light Racing	Chevrolet
33	5	Matt Mills	B. J. McLeod Motorsports	Chevrolet
34	78	Jesse Little	B. J. McLeod Motorsports	Chevrolet
35	31	Austin Dillon	Jordan Anderson Racing	Chevrolet
36	99	Ryan Ellis	B. J. McLeod Motorsports	Ford
37	47	Kyle Weatherman	Mike Harmon Racing	Chevrolet
38	74	Carson Ware	Mike Harmon Racing	Chevrolet
39	90	B. J. McLeod	DGM Racing	Chevrolet
40	52	Gray Gaulding	Jimmy Means Racing	Chevrolet
Failed to qualify
41	13	Chad Finchum	MBM Motorsports	Toyota
Official starting lineup

== Race results ==
Stage 1 Laps: 45

Fin	#	Driver	Team	Make	Pts
1	18	Daniel Hemric	Joe Gibbs Racing	Toyota	10
2	9	Noah Gragson	JR Motorsports	Chevrolet	9
3	16	A. J. Allmendinger	Kaulig Racing	Chevrolet	8
4	11	Justin Haley	Kaulig Racing	Chevrolet	7
5	54	Denny Hamlin	Joe Gibbs Racing	Toyota	0
6	20	Harrison Burton	Joe Gibbs Racing	Toyota	5
7	22	Austin Cindric	Team Penske	Ford	4
8	19	Brandon Jones	Joe Gibbs Racing	Toyota	3
9	2	Myatt Snider	Richard Childress Racing	Chevrolet	2
10	7	Justin Allgaier	JR Motorsports	Chevrolet	1

Stage 2 Laps: 45

Fin	#	Driver	Team	Make	Pts
1	9	Noah Gragson	JR Motorsports	Chevrolet	10
2	54	Denny Hamlin	Joe Gibbs Racing	Toyota	0
3	22	Austin Cindric	Team Penske	Ford	8
4	7	Justin Allgaier	JR Motorsports	Chevrolet	7
5	18	Daniel Hemric	Joe Gibbs Racing	Toyota	6
6	16	A. J. Allmendinger	Kaulig Racing	Chevrolet	5
7	20	Harrison Burton	Joe Gibbs Racing	Toyota	4
8	31	Austin Dillon	Jordan Anderson Racing	Chevrolet	0
9	11	Justin Haley	Kaulig Racing	Chevrolet	2
10	2	Myatt Snider	Richard Childress Racing	Chevrolet	1

Stage 3 Laps: 62

Fin	St	#	Driver	Team	Make	Laps	Led	Status	Pts
1	8	9	Noah Gragson	JR Motorsports	Chevrolet	152	40	running	59
2	6	20	Harrison Burton	Joe Gibbs Racing	Toyota	152	0	running	44
3	24	22	Austin Cindric	Team Penske	Ford	152	1	running	46
4	3	11	Justin Haley	Kaulig Racing	Chevrolet	152	4	running	42
5	5	10	Jeb Burton	Kaulig Racing	Chevrolet	152	0	running	32
6	4	7	Justin Allgaier	JR Motorsports	Chevrolet	152	19	running	39
7	28	23	Tyler Reddick	Our Motorsports	Chevrolet	152	0	running	0
8	15	51	Jeremy Clements	Jeremy Clements Racing	Chevrolet	152	0	running	29
9	9	2	Myatt Snider	Richard Childress Racing	Chevrolet	152	0	running	31
10	22	36	Alex Labbé	DGM Racing	Chevrolet	152	0	running	27
11	12	39	Ryan Sieg	RSS Racing	Ford	152	0	running	26
12	14	54	Denny Hamlin	Joe Gibbs Racing	Toyota	152	43	running	0
13	10	02	Ty Dillon	Our Motorsports	Chevrolet	152	0	running	24
14	19	1	Michael Annett	JR Motorsports	Chevrolet	152	0	running	23
15	16	92	Josh Williams	DGM Racing	Chevrolet	152	0	running	22
16	17	4	Landon Cassill	JD Motorsports	Chevrolet	152	0	running	21
17	31	26	Colin Garrett	Sam Hunt Racing	Toyota	152	0	running	20
18	26	17	Mason Massey	SS-Green Light Racing with Rick Ware Racing	Chevrolet	152	0	running	19
19	32	07	Joe Graf Jr.	SS-Green Light Racing	Chevrolet	152	0	running	18
20	2	16	A. J. Allmendinger	Kaulig Racing	Chevrolet	152	24	running	30
21	20	48	Jade Buford	Big Machine Racing Team	Chevrolet	152	0	running	16
22	39	90	B. J. McLeod	DGM Racing	Chevrolet	152	0	running	0
23	33	5	Matt Mills	B. J. McLeod Motorsports	Chevrolet	152	0	running	14
24	1	18	Daniel Hemric	Joe Gibbs Racing	Toyota	152	18	running	29
25	27	6	Ryan Vargas	JD Motorsports	Chevrolet	152	0	running	12
26	21	0	Jeffrey Earnhardt	JD Motorsports	Chevrolet	152	0	running	11
27	30	15	Colby Howard	JD Motorsports	Chevrolet	152	0	running	10
28	23	68	Brandon Brown	Brandonbilt Motorsports	Chevrolet	151	0	running	9
29	35	31	Austin Dillon	Jordan Anderson Racing	Chevrolet	151	0	running	0
30	18	61	David Starr	Hattori Racing Enterprises	Toyota	151	0	running	7
31	38	74	Carson Ware	Mike Harmon Racing	Chevrolet	151	0	running	6
32	34	78	Jesse Little	B. J. McLeod Motorsports	Chevrolet	150	0	running	5
33	25	19	Brandon Jones	Joe Gibbs Racing	Toyota	146	0	running	7
34	37	47	Kyle Weatherman	Mike Harmon Racing	Chevrolet	134	0	running	3
35	36	99	Ryan Ellis	B. J. McLeod Motorsports	Ford	133	0	running	2
36	29	66	Timmy Hill	MBM Motorsports	Ford	116	3	accident	0
37	13	44	Tommy Joe Martins	Martins Motorsports	Chevrolet	108	0	accident	1
38	7	98	Riley Herbst	Stewart-Haas Racing	Ford	107	0	accident	1
39	11	8	Sam Mayer	JR Motorsports	Chevrolet	45	0	brakes	1
40	40	52	Gray Gaulding	Jimmy Means Racing	Chevrolet	2	0	electrical	1
Failed to qualify
41		13	Chad Finchum	MBM Motorsports	Toyota				
Official race results

Previous race: 2021 Wawa 250	NASCAR Xfinity Series; 2021 season	Next race: 2021 Go Bowling 250
