= Hezemans =

Hezemans is a surname. Notable people with the surname include:

- Loris Hezemans (born 1997), Dutch racing driver
- Mike Hezemans (born 1969), Dutch racing driver
- Toine Hezemans (born 1943), Dutch racing driver
