= 2015 Audi Sport TT Cup =

The 2015 Audi Sport TT Cup season was the inaugural season of the Audi Sport TT Cup, a one-make sports car racing series organised by Audi. It began on 2 May at Hockenheim and finished on 18 October at the same venue after six double-header meetings, all of which were support events for the Deutsche Tourenwagen Masters.

Poland's Jan Kisiel won the title by 25 points ahead of Danish driver Nicolaj Møller Madsen, while Dennis Marschall of Germany completed the championship top-3, a further 19.5 points in arrears of Møller Madsen. After trailing Marschall by twenty points after the first event at Hockenheim, Kisiel then achieved a run of eight successive podium finishes, with five victories in six races – including four wins in consecutive races at Oschersleben and the Nürburgring – moving him into the championship lead. A fifth-place in the first race at the Hockenheim finale sealed the championship. Møller Madsen – who started the season with five consecutive podium finishes including a win at the Norisring – and Marschall, who won a race at the season-opening event, were split by half a point going into the final weekend, but two podium finishes for Møller Madsen moved him clear.

Outside the top three drivers, Finnish driver Joonas Lappalainen finished in fourth place after achieving a pair of class wins behind guest drivers René Rast and Marco Bonanomi in the Hockenheim finale. Three other drivers won races during the season; Shaun Thong won at the Norisring, but that was his only podium finish of the 2015 season. Belgium's Alexis van de Poele – son of 1987 DTM champion Eric van de Poele – was declared winner of the rain-shortened race at the Red Bull Ring, while Austria's Marc Coleselli won the opening race of the season, but did not contest any further meetings during the season.

== Drivers ==
| No. | Drivers | Rounds |
|---|---|---|
| 3 | (Poland) Gosia Rdest | All |
| 5 | (Russia) Nikita Misyulya | 3–5 |
| 7 | (Germany) Christoph Hofbauer | 1–5 |
| 8 | (Hong Kong) Shaun Thong | All |
| 9 | (Turkey) Kaan Önder | All |
| 11 | (Switzerland) Levin Amweg | 1–3, 6 |
| 14 | (United Kingdom) Josh Caygill | All |
| 17 | (Denmark) Nicolaj Møller Madsen | All |
| 26 | (Germany) Dominik Peitz | All |
| 27 | (Germany) Dennis Marschall | All |
| 33 | (Finland) Emil Lindholm | All |
| 40 | (Austria) Marc Coleselli | 1 |
| 43 | (Poland) Jan Kisiel | All |
| 45 | (Finland) Joonas Lappalainen | All |
| 49 | (United States) Sebastian Landy | All |
| 50 | (Netherlands) Loris Hezemans | All |
| 55 | (Belgium) Alexis van de Poele | All |
| 89 | (Sweden) Mikaela Åhlin-Kottulinsky | All |
| 92 | (Sweden) Anton Marklund | 1–5 |
Guest drivers
| 4 | (United Kingdom) Aaron Mason | 6 |
| 93 | (Spain) Jordi Gené | 2 |
| 93 | (South Africa) Jeffrey Kruger | 6 |
| 94 | (United States) Tanner Foust | 1 |
| 94 | (Monaco) Pierre Casiraghi | 2 |
| 94 | (Italy) Emiliano Perucca Orfei | 3 |
| 94 | (Germany) Harald Grohs | 4 |
| 94 | (Germany) Matthias Malmedie | 5 |
| 94 | (Italy) Alberto Sabbatini | 6 |
| 95 | (Finland) Toomas Heikkinen | 1 |
| 95 | (Germany) Albert von Thurn und Taxis | 2 |
| 95 | (Switzerland) Rahel Frey | 3 |
| 95 | (Germany) Frank Biela | 4 |
| 95 | (Germany) Nikolaus Schelle | 5 |
| 95 | (Germany) Reiner Kuhn | 6 |
| 96 | (Germany) Sven Hannawald | 1 |
| 96 | (Germany) Marcus Graf von Oeynhausen-Sierstorpff | 2 |
| 96 | (Norway) Aksel Lund Svindal | 3 |
| 96 | (Germany) Uwe Alzen | 4 |
| 96 | (India) Aditya Patel | 5 |
| 96 | (Sweden) Jon Olsson | 6 |
| 97 | (Austria) Ferdinand Stuck | 1 |
| 97 | (Germany) Sebastian Schmidt | 2 |
| 97 | (Germany) Felix Neureuther | 3 |
| 97 | (United Kingdom) Alex Lloyd | 4 |
| 97 | (Germany) René Rast | 6 |
| 98 | (Germany) Horst von Saurma | 1 |
| 98 | (Germany) Lutz Gernert | 2 |
| 98 | (Austria) Marcel Hirscher | 3 |
| 98 | (Germany) Tim Schrick | 4 |
| 98 | (Germany) Guido Naumann | 5 |
| 98 | (Italy) Marco Bonanomi | 6 |
| 99 | (Germany) Christian Gebhardt | 1 |
| 99 | (Germany) Doreen Seidel | 2–5 |
| 99 | (Germany) Patrick Simon | 6 |

== Race calendar and results ==
| Round | | Circuit | Date | Pole position | Fastest lap | Winning driver |
|---|---|---|---|---|---|---|
| 1 | R1 | (Germany) Hockenheimring, Baden-Württemberg | 2 May | (Denmark) Nicolaj Møller Madsen | (Denmark) Nicolaj Møller Madsen | (Austria) Marc Coleselli |
| 1 | R2 | (Germany) Hockenheimring, Baden-Württemberg | 3 May | (Denmark) Nicolaj Møller Madsen | (Belgium) Alexis van de Poele | (Germany) Dennis Marschall |
| 2 | R1 | (Germany) Norisring, Nuremberg | 27 June | (Hong Kong) Shaun Thong | (Germany) Dominik Peitz | (Hong Kong) Shaun Thong |
| 2 | R2 | (Germany) Norisring, Nuremberg | 28 June | (Hong Kong) Shaun Thong | (Sweden) Mikaela Åhlin-Kottulinsky | (Denmark) Nicolaj Møller Madsen |
| 3 | R1 | (Austria) Red Bull Ring, Spielberg | 1 August | (Denmark) Nicolaj Møller Madsen | (Germany) Dennis Marschall | (Poland) Jan Kisiel |
| 3 | R2 | (Austria) Red Bull Ring, Spielberg | 2 August | (Belgium) Alexis van de Poele | (Switzerland) Levin Amweg | (Belgium) Alexis van de Poele |
| 4 | R1 | (Germany) Motorsport Arena Oschersleben, Saxony-Anhalt | 12 September | (Poland) Jan Kisiel | (Denmark) Nicolaj Møller Madsen | (Poland) Jan Kisiel |
| 4 | R2 | (Germany) Motorsport Arena Oschersleben, Saxony-Anhalt | 13 September | (Poland) Jan Kisiel | (Poland) Jan Kisiel | (Poland) Jan Kisiel |
| 5 | R1 | (Germany) Nürburgring, Rhineland-Palatinate | 26 September | (Finland) Emil Lindholm | (Germany) Dennis Marschall | (Poland) Jan Kisiel |
| 5 | R2 | (Germany) Nürburgring, Rhineland-Palatinate | 27 September | (Poland) Jan Kisiel | (Poland) Jan Kisiel | (Poland) Jan Kisiel |
| 6 | R1 | (Germany) Hockenheimring, Baden-Württemberg | 17 October | (Finland) Joonas Lappalainen | (Italy) Marco Bonanomi | (Germany) René Rast |
| 6 | R2 | (Germany) Hockenheimring, Baden-Württemberg | 18 October | (Germany) René Rast | (Sweden) Mikaela Åhlin-Kottulinsky | (Italy) Marco Bonanomi |

== Championship standings ==
Scoring system

Points were awarded to the top eighteen classified finishers as follows:

| Position | **1st** | **2nd** | **3rd** | **4th** | **5th** | **6th** | **7th** | **8th** | **9th** | **10th** | **11th** | **12th** | **13th** | **14th** | **15th** | **16th** | **17th** | **18th** |
| Points | 25 | 21 | 18 | 16 | 14 | 13 | 12 | 11 | 10 | 9 | 8 | 7 | 6 | 5 | 4 | 3 | 2 | 1 |

=== Drivers' championship ===
The second race at the Red Bull Ring was red-flagged after four laps, due to a multi-car incident involving Christoph Hofbauer, Levin Amweg, Loris Hezemans, Kaan Önder, Emil Lindholm and Anton Marklund. The first three laps of the race had been completed behind the safety car, due to a heavy downpour. As less than 50% of the scheduled race distance had been covered, half points were awarded.

| Pos. | Driver | HOC (Germany) | | NOR (Germany) | | RBR (Austria) | | OSC (Germany) | | NÜR (Germany) | | HOC (Germany) | | Points |
|---|---|---|---|---|---|---|---|---|---|---|---|---|---|---|
| 1 | (Poland) Jan Kisiel | 4 | 14 | 2 | 2 | 1 | 3 | **1** | **1** | 1 | **1** | 6 | 4 | 231 |
| 2 | (Denmark) Nicolaj Møller Madsen | **2** | **2** | 3 | 1 | **3** | 4 | 7 | 6 | 4 | 12 | 3 | 3 | 206 |
| 3 | (Germany) Dennis Marschall | 3 | 1 | 7 | Ret | 2 | 2 | 5 | 5 | 2 | 2 | 5 | 16 | 186.5 |
| 4 | (Finland) Joonas Lappalainen | 6 | 5 | 6 | 11 | 14 | 13 | 3 | 2 | 19 | DNS | **2** | 2 | 157.5 |
| 5 | (Finland) Emil Lindholm | 10 | 13 | 15 | 12 | 18 | 8 | 9 | 10 | **3** | 4 | 9 | 14 | 115 |
| 6 | (Hong Kong) Shaun Thong | Ret | 16 | **1** | **16** | 11 | 10 | 10 | 18 | 8 | 5 | 20 | 12 | 106 |
| 7 | (Netherlands) Loris Hezemans | Ret | 9 | 10 | 7 | 5 | 9 | 8 | 13 | Ret | 3 | DSQ | 8 | 105.5 |
| 8 | (Germany) Dominik Peitz | Ret | Ret | 9 | 9 | 7 | 11 | 13 | 8 | 20 | 10 | 4 | 6 | 105.5 |
| 9 | (Germany) Christoph Hofbauer | 8 | 7 | 5 | 8 | 6 | 7 | 6 | 9 | 18 | DNS | | | 105.5 |
| 10 | (United Kingdom) Josh Caygill | 11 | 19 | 13 | 6 | 13 | 16 | 4 | 7 | 7 | 16 | 15 | Ret | 103 |
| 11 | (Belgium) Alexis van de Poele | 17 | 3 | 11 | Ret | 17 | **1** | 14 | 14 | Ret | 7 | 8 | 7 | 100.5 |
| 12 | (Poland) Gosia Rdest | 15 | 20 | 18 | 13 | 8 | 17 | 17 | 11 | 9 | 9 | 13 | 9 | 90.5 |
| 13 | (Switzerland) Levin Amweg | 7 | 11 | 14 | 5 | 12 | 12 | | | | | 10 | 5 | 84 |
| 14 | (Turkey) Kaan Önder | Ret | 12 | Ret | 10 | 9 | 6 | 11 | Ret | 12 | 17 | 11 | 13 | 79 |
| 15 | (Sweden) Mikaela Åhlin-Kottulinsky | 9 | Ret | 8 | 3 | 10 | 18 | Ret | 12 | 6 | Ret | Ret | Ret | 75 |
| 16 | (Sweden) Anton Marklund | 14 | 8 | 12 | Ret | 15 | 14 | 12 | 21 | 14 | 11 | | | 63 |
| 17 | (Austria) Marc Coleselli | 1 | 4 | | | | | | | | | | | 41 |
| 18 | (United States) Sebastian Landy | Ret | Ret | 16 | 15 | 16 | 15 | Ret | 16 | 10 | Ret | 14 | DNS | 39.5 |
| 19 | (Russia) Nikita Misyulya | | | | | 20 | 20 | 16 | 15 | 11 | 8 | | | 33.5 |
Guest drivers ineligible for championship points
| | (Germany) René Rast | | | | | | | | | | | 1 | **11** | 0 |
| | (Italy) Marco Bonanomi | | | | | | | | | | | 12 | 1 | 0 |
| | (Germany) Uwe Alzen | | | | | | | 2 | 3 | | | | | 0 |
| | (Spain) Jordi Gené | | | 4 | 4 | | | | | | | | | 0 |
| | (Switzerland) Rahel Frey | | | | | 4 | 5 | | | | | | | 0 |
| | (United Kingdom) Alex Lloyd | | | | | | | Ret | 4 | | | | | 0 |
| | (India) Aditya Patel | | | | | | | | | 5 | 6 | | | 0 |
| | (United States) Tanner Foust | 5 | 6 | | | | | | | | | | | 0 |
| | (South Africa) Jeffrey Kruger | | | | | | | | | | | 7 | 10 | 0 |
| | (Austria) Ferdinand Stuck | Ret | 10 | | | | | | | | | | | 0 |
| | (Germany) Christian Gebhardt | 12 | 17 | | | | | | | | | | | 0 |
| | (Germany) Doreen Seidel | | | 19 | 17 | 19 | 23 | 15 | 19 | 17 | 13 | | | 0 |
| | (Finland) Toomas Heikkinen | 13 | 21 | | | | | | | | | | | 0 |
| | (Germany) Nikolaus Schelle | | | | | | | | | 13 | Ret | | | 0 |
| | (Germany) Matthias Malmedie | | | | | | | | | 16 | 14 | | | 0 |
| | (Germany) Marcus Graf von Oeynhausen-Sierstorpff | | | 17 | 14 | | | | | | | | | 0 |
| | (Germany) Guido Naumann | | | | | | | | | 15 | 15 | | | 0 |
| | (Germany) Patrick Simon | | | | | | | | | | | 16 | 15 | 0 |
| | (Germany) Horst von Saurma | 16 | 15 | | | | | | | | | | | 0 |
| | (Sweden) Jon Olsson | | | | | | | | | | | 17 | 18 | 0 |
| | (Germany) Tim Schrick | | | | | | | 18 | 17 | | | | | 0 |
| | (United Kingdom) Aaron Mason | | | | | | | | | | | Ret | 17 | 0 |
| | (Germany) Reiner Kuhn | | | | | | | | | | | 18 | 20 | 0 |
| | (Monaco) Pierre Casiraghi | | | 20 | 18 | | | | | | | | | 0 |
| | (Germany) Sven Hannawald | Ret | 18 | | | | | | | | | | | 0 |
| | (Italy) Alberto Sabbatini | | | | | | | | | | | 19 | 19 | 0 |
| | (Italy) Emiliano Perucca Orfei | | | | | 21 | 19 | | | | | | | 0 |
| | (Germany) Sebastian Schmidt | | | 21 | 19 | | | | | | | | | 0 |
| | (Germany) Harald Grohs | | | | | | | Ret | 20 | | | | | 0 |
| | (Germany) Albert von Thurn und Taxis | | | Ret | 20 | | | | | | | | | 0 |
| | (Austria) Marcel Hirscher | | | | | 22 | 21 | | | | | | | 0 |
| | (Germany) Felix Neureuther | | | | | 23 | 22 | | | | | | | 0 |
| | (Norway) Aksel Lund Svindal | | | | | 24 | 24 | | | | | | | 0 |
| | (Germany) Frank Biela | | | | | | | Ret | Ret | | | | | 0 |
| | (Germany) Lutz Gernert | | | WD | WD | | | | | | | | | 0 |
| Pos. | Driver | HOC (Germany) | | NOR (Germany) | | RBR (Austria) | | OSC (Germany) | | NÜR (Germany) | | HOC (Germany) | | Points |

| Colour | Result |
|---|---|
| Gold | Winner |
| Silver | Second place |
| Bronze | Third place |
| Green | Points classification |
| Blue | Non-points classification |
| Blue | Non-classified finish (NC) |
| Purple | Retired, not classified (Ret) |
| Red | Did not qualify (DNQ) |
| Red | Did not pre-qualify (DNPQ) |
| Black | Disqualified (DSQ) |
| White | Did not start (DNS) |
| White | Withdrew (WD) |
| White | Race cancelled (C) |
| Blank | Did not practice (DNP) |
| Blank | Did not arrive (DNA) |
| Blank | Excluded (EX) |

**Bold** – Pole
Italics – Fastest Lap
