= 2021 NASCAR Whelen Euro Series =

European auto racing season

Locations of the circuits that hosted a NASCAR Whelen Euro Series race in 2021

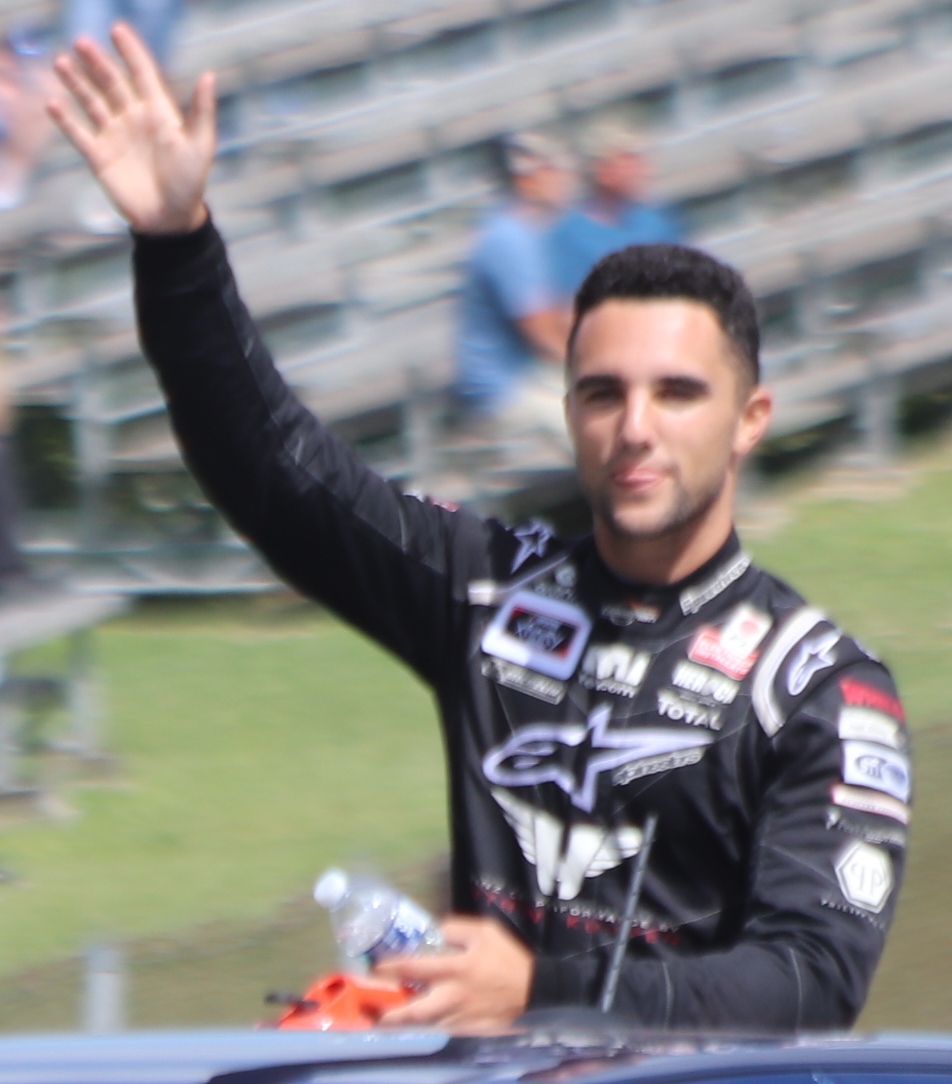
Loris Hezemans won his second Euro Series championship title in 2021.

The 2021 NASCAR Whelen Euro Series was the thirteenth Racecar Euro Series season, and the ninth under the NASCAR Whelen Euro Series branding. The season began at Circuit Ricardo Tormo with the NASCAR GP Spain on 15 May and ended on 31 October with the NASCAR GP Italy at Autodromo Vallelunga.

Despite not taking part in the fifth round at Zolder to compete in the NASCAR Xfinity Series race at the Charlotte Roval, Loris Hezemans was crowned as champion at Vallelunga after winning four races and finishing 7 races inside the podium, his second title in the series. He finished the season 3 points ahead of Gianmarco Ercoli, who scored a race win at Rijeka and 7 podium finishes. Lucas Lasserre finished third despite being winless, tying his best championship finish in the series under NASCAR's official sanctioning. Defending series champion Alon Day won three races but was unable to defend his title after retiring four times while defending EuroNASCAR 2 champion Vittorio Ghirelli, who scored his maiden top class victory at Most, had his championship hopes dashed after a crash in the final race of the season. Stienes Longin and Jacques Villeneuve were the other race winners, Longin winning his home race at Zolder while Villeneuve swept the weekend at Vallelunga.

In the EuroNASCAR 2 class, Martin Doubek won the title after teammate Tobias Dauenhauer crashed late in the final round of the season. Both drivers scored a total of five race wins and nine podiums each, but Dauenhauer's incident on the final race handed the championship to Doubek who won the title by 17 points. Not Only Motorsport driver Naveh Talor finished third after scoring his maiden win at Zolder. Indian driver Advait Deodhar was the only other race winner of the season, scoring a victory in the first race at Brands Hatch.

Hendriks Motorsport won the Teams Championship for a record third time as the team's No. 7 car, driven by series champions Hezemans and Doubek, would finish the season on top of the Teams standings with 969 points. DF1 Racing's No. 22 team finished second with 875 points, 94 points adrift from Hendriks' No. 7 team, while the No. 50 Hendriks team would finish third with 867 points.

== Teams and drivers ==
NASCAR Whelen Euro Series released a provisional 26-car entry list for the teams participating on 14 April 2021.

=== EuroNASCAR PRO ===
| Team | No. | Body Style | Race Driver | Rounds |
|---|---|---|---|---|
| (Italy) Academy Motorsport | 1 | Ford Mustang | (France) Thomas Ferrando | 1 |
| (Italy) Academy Motorsport | 1 | Ford Mustang | (Slovakia) Michaela Dorcikova | 3 |
| (Italy) Academy Motorsport | 2 | EuroNASCAR FJ 2020 | (Italy) Federico Monti | 2–6 |
| (Italy) Academy Motorsport | 5 | EuroNASCAR FJ 2020 | (Canada) Jacques Villeneuve | 1, 3–4, 6 |
| (Italy) Academy Motorsport | 5 | EuroNASCAR FJ 2020 | (France) Patrick Lemarié | 5 |
| (Italy) Academy Motorsport | 24 | Chevrolet Camaro | (United Kingdom) Alex Sedgwick | 2 |
| (France) RDV Competition | 3 | EuroNASCAR FJ 2020 | (France) Frédéric Gabillon | 1–3 |
| (France) RDV Competition | 10 | Chevrolet Camaro | (France) Ulysse Delsaux | All |
| (Finland) Iceboys | 4 | Ford Mustang | (Finland) Luka Nurmi | 6 |
| (Netherlands) Hendriks Motorsport-MOMO | 7 | Ford Mustang | (Netherlands) Loris Hezemans | 1–4, 6 |
| (Netherlands) Hendriks Motorsport-MOMO | 7 | Ford Mustang | (Czech Republic) Martin Doubek | 5 |
| (Netherlands) Hendriks Motorsport-MOMO | 18 | Ford Mustang | (Switzerland) Giorgio Maggi | All |
| (Netherlands) Hendriks Motorsport-MOMO | 50 | Ford Mustang | (Italy) Vittorio Ghirelli | 1–5 |
| (Italy) Vict Motorsport | 8 | Chevrolet Camaro | (Italy) Dario Caso | 1, 3–6 |
| (Italy) Vict Motorsport | 9 | Chevrolet Camaro | (Italy) Leonardo Colavita | 4–6 |
| (Belgium) PK Carsport | 11 | Chevrolet Camaro | (Belgium) Stienes Longin | 5 |
| (Italy) Solaris Motorsport | 12 | Chevrolet Camaro | (Italy) Francesco Sini | 1, 3–6 |
| (Switzerland) 42 Racing | 17 | Shadow DNM8 | (Italy) Bernardo Manfrè | 1–4, 6 |
| (Switzerland) 42 Racing | 42 | Shadow DNM8 | (Italy) Luigi Ferrara | 1 |
| (Austria) DF1 Racing (Finland) Iceboys with DF1 Racing (Note: Car No. 23 was entered as Iceboys with DF1 Racing.) | 22 | Chevrolet Camaro | (Italy) Nicolò Rocca | All |
| (Austria) DF1 Racing (Finland) Iceboys with DF1 Racing | 23 | Chevrolet Camaro 3 Ford Mustang 3 | (Finland) Henri Tuomaala | All |
| (Austria) DF1 Racing (Finland) Iceboys with DF1 Racing | 44 | Chevrolet Camaro | (Finland) Ian Eric Wadén | 1, 3, 5 |
| (Austria) DF1 Racing (Finland) Iceboys with DF1 Racing | 44 | Chevrolet Camaro | (Sweden) Alexander Graff | 2 |
| (Austria) DF1 Racing (Finland) Iceboys with DF1 Racing | 66 | Chevrolet Camaro | (France) Patrick Lemarié | 1, 3–4, 6 |
| (Austria) DF1 Racing (Finland) Iceboys with DF1 Racing | 66 | Chevrolet Camaro | (Belgium) Simon Pilate | 2, 5 |
| (Austria) DF1 Racing (Finland) Iceboys with DF1 Racing | 77 | Chevrolet Camaro | (Belgium) Marc Goossens | 1–4 |
| (Germany) Marko Stipp Motorsport | 46 | Chevrolet Camaro | (United Kingdom) Scott Jeffs | 2 |
| (Germany) Marko Stipp Motorsport | 46 | Chevrolet Camaro | (France) Romain Iannetta | 3–4, 6 |
| (Germany) Marko Stipp Motorsport | 46 | Chevrolet Camaro | (France) Pierre Combot | 5 |
| (Germany) Marko Stipp Motorsport | 48 | Chevrolet Camaro | (Ukraine) Evgeny Sokolovsky | All |
| (Italy) CAAL Racing | 54 | Chevrolet Camaro | (Italy) Gianmarco Ercoli | All |
| (Italy) CAAL Racing | 56 | Ford Mustang | (Belgium) Marc Goossens | 5 |
| (Italy) CAAL Racing | 56 | Ford Mustang | (Italy) Davide Amaduzzi | 6 |
| (Italy) CAAL Racing | 88 | Chevrolet Camaro | (Israel) Alon Day | All |
| (Italy) The Club Motorsport | 55 | Chevrolet Camaro | (Italy) Fabrizio Armetta | 1, 4, 6 |
| (France) Speedhouse | 64 | Ford Mustang | (France) Lucas Lasserre | All |
| (Netherlands) Team Bleekemolen | 69 | Ford Mustang | (Netherlands) Sebastiaan Bleekemolen | All |
| (Italy) Not Only Motorsport | 89 | Chevrolet Camaro | (Italy) Davide Dallara | All |
| (Italy) Not Only Motorsport | 90 | Chevrolet Camaro | (Italy) Andrea Nori | 1, 3 |
| (Italy) Not Only Motorsport | 90 | Chevrolet Camaro | (Ukraine) Igor Romanov | 2 |
| (Italy) Not Only Motorsport | 90 | Chevrolet Camaro | (Italy) Nicolò Gabossi | 4–5 |
| (Italy) Not Only Motorsport | 90 | Chevrolet Camaro | (Italy) Vittorio Ghirelli | 6 |

=== EuroNASCAR 2 ===
| Team | No. | Body Style | Race Driver | Rounds |
|---|---|---|---|---|
| (Italy) Academy Motorsport | 1 | Ford Mustang | (Cyprus) Vladimiros Tziortzis | All |
| (Italy) Academy Motorsport | 2 | EuroNASCAR FJ 2020 | (Greece) Thomas Krasonis | All |
| (Finland) Iceboys | 4 | Ford Mustang | (Finland) Ossi Peltola | 6 |
| (Netherlands) Hendriks Motorsport-MOMO | 7 | Ford Mustang | (Czech Republic) Martin Doubek | All |
| (Netherlands) Hendriks Motorsport-MOMO | 50 | Ford Mustang | (Germany) Tobias Dauenhauer | All |
| (Italy) Vict Motorsport | 8 | Chevrolet Camaro | (Italy) Paolo Valeri | 1, 3–6 |
| (Italy) Vict Motorsport | 9 | Chevrolet Camaro | (Italy) Leonardo Colavita | 4–6 |
| (France) RDV Competition | 10 | Chevrolet Camaro | (France) Didier Bec | 1 |
| (Belgium) PK Carsport | 11 | Chevrolet Camaro | (Belgium) Pol van Pollaert | 5 |
| (Italy) Solaris Motorsport | 12 | Chevrolet Camaro | (Austria) Alina Loibnegger | All |
| (Switzerland) 42 Racing | 17 | Shadow DNM8 | (Italy) Bernardo Manfrè | 1 |
| (Switzerland) 42 Racing | 17 | Shadow DNM8 | (Italy) Francesco Garisto | 2 |
| (Switzerland) 42 Racing | 17 | Shadow DNM8 | (Italy) Alfredo de Matteo | 6 |
| (Switzerland) 42 Racing | 42 | Shadow DNM8 | (Italy) Francesco Garisto | 1, 3–6 |
| (Austria) DF1 Racing (Finland) Iceboys with DF1 Racing | 22 | Chevrolet Camaro | (Germany) Justin Kunz | All |
| (Austria) DF1 Racing (Finland) Iceboys with DF1 Racing | 23 | Chevrolet Camaro 3 Ford Mustang 3 | (Finland) Leevi Lintukanto | All |
| (Austria) DF1 Racing (Finland) Iceboys with DF1 Racing | 44 | Chevrolet Camaro | (Finland) Ian Eric Wadén | 1–3, 5 |
| (Austria) DF1 Racing (Finland) Iceboys with DF1 Racing | 66 | Chevrolet Camaro | (Belgium) Simon Pilate | All |
| (Austria) DF1 Racing (Finland) Iceboys with DF1 Racing | 77 | Chevrolet Camaro | (United Kingdom) Shaun Hollamby | 2 |
| (Austria) DF1 Racing (Finland) Iceboys with DF1 Racing | 77 | Chevrolet Camaro | (Luxembourg) Gil Linster | 3–5 |
| (Italy) Double V Racing | 27 | Ford Mustang | (Italy) Pierluigi Veronesi | All |
| (Germany) Marko Stipp Motorsport | 46 | Chevrolet Camaro | (Portugal) Miguel Gomes | All |
| (Germany) Marko Stipp Motorsport | 48 | Chevrolet Camaro | (Ukraine) Evgeny Sokolovsky | All |
| (Italy) CAAL Racing | 54 | Chevrolet Camaro | (Italy) Arianna Casoli | 1–3, 5–6 |
| (Italy) CAAL Racing | 56 | Ford Mustang | (India) Advait Deodhar | All |
| (Italy) CAAL Racing | 88 | Chevrolet Camaro | (Italy) Max Lanza | All |
| (Italy) The Club Motorsport | 55 | Chevrolet Camaro | (Italy) Fabrizio Armetta | 1, 6 |
| (France) Speedhouse | 64 | Ford Mustang | (France) Eric Quintal | 1, 3–6 |
| (France) Speedhouse | 64 | Ford Mustang | (Germany) Matthias Hauer | 2 |
| (Netherlands) Team Bleekemolen | 69 | Ford Mustang | (Netherlands) Michael Bleekemolen | 1–3 |
| (Netherlands) Team Bleekemolen | 69 | Ford Mustang | (Netherlands) Melvin de Groot | 4–5 |
| (Italy) Not Only Motorsport | 89 | Chevrolet Camaro | (Italy) Alberto Panebianco | All |
| (Italy) Not Only Motorsport | 90 | Chevrolet Camaro | (Israel) Naveh Talor | All |

=== EuroNASCAR Club Challenge ===
| Team | No. | Body Style | Race Driver | Rounds |
|---|---|---|---|---|
| (Italy) Academy Motorsport | 1 | Ford Mustang | (Cyprus) Vladimiros Tziortzis | All |
| (Italy) Academy Motorsport | 2 | EuroNASCAR FJ 2020 | (Italy) Federico Monti | All |
| (Finland) Iceboys | 4 | Ford Mustang | (France) Hugo Roch | 5 |
| (Italy) Vict Motorsport | 9 | Chevrolet Camaro | (Italy) Leonardo Colavita | 2–5 |
| (France) RDV Competition | 10 | Chevrolet Camaro | (France) Jerome Mure | 1–4 |
| (Italy) Solaris Motorsport | 12 | Chevrolet Camaro | (Austria) Alina Loibnegger | 2–5 |
| (France) Speedhouse by 42 Racing | 17 | Shadow DNM8 | (Germany) Marcel Berndt | 1–2 |
| (Switzerland) 42 Racing | 42 | Shadow DNM8 | (Italy) Francesco Garisto | 2–5 |
| (Italy) Double V Racing | 27 | Ford Mustang | (France) Mitch Maguerez | 3 |
| (Italy) Double V Racing | 27 | Ford Mustang | (Lithuania) Kasparas Vingilis | 5 |
| (Germany) Marko Stipp Motorsport | 46 | Chevrolet Camaro | (Austria) Andreas Kuchelbacher | 2–5 |
| (Germany) Marko Stipp Motorsport | 48 | Chevrolet Camaro | (United Kingdom) Gordon Barnes | All |
| (Italy) CAAL Racing | 54 | Chevrolet Camaro | (United Arab Emirates) Yasmeen Koloc | 3 |
| (Italy) CAAL Racing | 56 | Ford Mustang | (United Arab Emirates) Aliyyah Koloc | 3 |
| (France) Speedhouse | 64 | Ford Mustang | (France) Paul Jouffreau | All |
| (Germany) DF1 Racing | 66 | Chevrolet Camaro | (Sweden) Norling Kristoffer | 5 |
| (Italy) Not Only Motorsport | 89 | Chevrolet Camaro | (Italy) Nicolò Gabossi | All |
| (Italy) Not Only Motorsport | 90 | Chevrolet Camaro | (Italy) Simona Lenci | All |

==== Driver changes ====
- Ander Vilariño was initially scheduled to compete full-time with DF1 Racing this year, but opted not to participate in the 2021 season. Vilariño was initially scheduled to compete the full 2020 season with the team, but withdrew due to family and business concerns caused by the COVID-19 pandemic before returning as part of DF1-MSM Racing in the season ending doubleheader at Valencia.
- On 7 December 2020, it was reported that Paul Jouffreau is set to make his debut in the series as the EuroNASCAR 2 class driver for Speedhouse. It was later revealed that Jouffreu was signed to become Speedhouse's Club Challenge class driver.
- On 4 February 2021, DF1 Racing announced that the team has signed both Patrick Lemarié and Simon Pilate to drive the No. 66 car for the 2021 season. Both drivers will move from FEED Vict Racing to replace Lasse Sørensen and Andreas Jochimsen respectively.
- On 3 March 2021, it was announced that Francesco Garisto will be returning to 42 Racing in 2021 after he switched teams to Marko Stipp Motorsport midway through 2020 due to 42 Racing being forced to withdraw from the second half of the 2020 season due to COVID-related problems.
- On 4 March 2021, it was announced that Jacques Villeneuve will be switching teams to Academy Motorsport for the 2021 season. Villeneuve will be moving from FEED Vict Racing and is scheduled to be returning to full-time competition after he competed part-time in 2020 due to schedule clashes with Canal+'s Formula One broadcasting schedule.
- On 18 March 2021, it was reported that Henri Tuomaala and Ian Eric Wadén will be returning to the series in 2021 with DF1 Racing. Tuomaala and Wadén were initially scheduled to enter the 2020 season with DF1 and Memphis Racing respectively, but they ultimately withdrew due to the restrictions caused by the ongoing COVID-19 pandemic. Later on 27 April 2021, it was announced that Leevi Lintukanto, who made his debut at Valencia last year with Not Only Motorsport, will become Tuomaala's teammate for the season opener at Valencia while Wadén will compete in both classes in 2021.
- On 23 March 2021, PK Carsport driver Stienes Longin announces that he will be temporarily exiting the series to compete in the newly established BMW M2 CS Racing Cup Benelux for PK, citing travel restriction concerns as the reason for his temporary exit from EuroNASCAR as he focuses on a return in 2022.
- On 26 March 2021, Marko Stipp Motorsport announced that Evgeny Sokolovsky will be driving the team's No. 48 car on both classes this year, bringing in sponsorship from Gulf Grandprix Originals. Sokolovsky competed full-time in the EuroNASCAR PRO class and took part in 8 races of the EuroNASCAR 2 class as a replacement driver for the injured Gašper Dernovšek last year.
- On 31 March 2021, it was announced that RDV Competition driver and three-time series runner-up Frédéric Gabillon will be returning to Euro Series for a possible final season after he and RDV Competition withdrew from the 2020 season due to the effects of COVID-19 pandemic. His teammate Ulysse Delsaux, who also withdrew from the 2020 season due to the effects of the pandemic, was later reported on the following day to be planning to make his return to the series in 2021. Delsaux's return to the series was announced on 8 May 2021, with the same announcement also revealing that Didier Bec would be making his return to the series as the EuroNASCAR 2 teammate of Delsaux in the No. 10 RDV team.
- On 2 April 2021, it was announced that Nicholas Risitano will be leaving the series to join the SR&R team in the Italian GT Championship for 2021. Solaris Motorsport would later announce on 5 May 2021 that former Club Challenge competitor Alina Loibnegger will be making her debut in Euro Series' two main classes as the team's new EuroNASCAR 2 class driver.
- On 9 April 2021, it was announced that Portuguese driver Miguel Gomes will be making his debut in the series as the full-time EuroNASCAR 2 class driver of Marko Stipp Motorsport's No. 46 Chevrolet.
- On 12 April 2021, Bleekemolen's Race Planet reveals that Sebastiaan Bleekemolen will be returning to the series after he and the team withdrew from 2020 due to the COVID-19 pandemic. Sebastiaan is planning to compete in both Euro Series and the newly established BMW M2 CS Racing Cup Benelux for 2021. Later on 30 April 2021, it was announced that Sebastiaan's father Michael would also return to the championship to compete in EuroNASCAR 2 as the teammate of Sebastiaan.
- On 23 April 2021, Hendriks Motorsport announced that defending EuroNASCAR 2 championship Vittorio Ghirelli will be promoted to the EuroNASCAR PRO class in 2021. Ghirelli is scheduled to drive the team's No. 50 car, replacing Loris Hezemans who will be transferred to the team's No. 7 car.
- On 25 April 2021, it was announced that defending series champion Alon Day will be returning to CAAL Racing after making a switch to PK Carsport in 2020. Day will be driving the team's No. 88 Monster Energy Chevrolet.
- On 29 April 2021, it was announced that Indian driver Advait Deodhar will be returning to the championship after taking a sabbatical in 2020. Deodhar will be driving CAAL Racing's No. 56 car in the EuroNASCAR 2 class.
- On 1 May 2021, it was announced that Thomas Krasonis will be returning to the championship to race the No. 2 car of Academy Motorsport in the EuroNASCAR 2 division.
- On 2 May 2021, it was announced that Justin Kunz will be transferred to DF1 Racing's No. 22 EuroNASCAR 2 seat for 2021. Kunz was originally supposed to be competing in EuroNASCAR PRO with DF1's No. 99 car, but he was demoted to EuroNASCAR 2 to maximize the team's chances of winning the championship after the team received news that Andre Castro wouldn't be able to compete until 2022 as a result of the ongoing COVID-19 restrictions in the United States. On the same day, it was also revealed that Japanese driver Kenko Miura would also not be able to compete until 2022 due to the ongoing COVID-19 restrictions in Japan.
- On 5 May 2021, it was announced that Pierluigi Veronesi will be returning to the series as an owner-driver of the debutant Double V Racing team in 2021.
- On 6 May 2021, Not Only Motorsport announced that series debutant Andrea Nori, Alberto Panebianco, Naveh Talor, and Igor Romanov would contest the 2021 season with the team for the full season. Panebianco and Romanov would make their full season debuts with the No. 89 and No. 91 teams in EuroNASCAR 2, while Talor makes his return as a full-time competitor after he competed part-time with the team in 2020.
- On 6 May 2021, it was reported that Paolo Valeri will be making his debut in the series as the EuroNASCAR 2 driver of Vict Motorsport, replacing Alessandro Brigatti who made the switch to BMW M2 CS Racing Cup Italia in 2021.
- On 7 May 2021, 42 Racing announced that Luigi Ferrara and Bernardo Manfrè would be returning to the championship after both drivers missed the second half of the 2020 season. Ferrara will continue to drive the team's No. 42 car in EuroNASCAR PRO while Manfrè will now drive the No. 17 car in EuroNASCAR 2.
- On 9 May 2021, it was announced that Fabrizio Armetta will be returning to the series after a two-year hiatus. Armetta will be competing in both classes as the owner-driver for The Club Motorsport.
- The Entry List for the season-opening NASCAR GP Spain at Valencia, released on 10 May 2021, revealed that Marc Goossens will make a switch to DF1 Racing as the new driver of DF1's renumbered No. 77 team, replacing Justin Kunz after Kunz was moved into EuroNASCAR 2. It was also revealed that Lucas Lasserre will contest the 2021 season as the owner-driver of Speedhouse, with his EuroNASCAR 2 teammate Eric Quintal also made the switch to Speedhouse in 2021.

==== Team changes ====
- Lucas Lasserre's Speedhouse team is set to be competing full-time for the first time this year. The team had previously competed part-time since their debut in 2019.
- Alex Caffi Motorsport will be rebranded into Academy Motorsport after Federico Monti signed a partnership deal to become a co-owner of the team. The team plans to field up to three cars and will retain Alex Caffi Motorsport's existing partnership with Race Art Technology.
- V8 Thunder Cars team racinGPalvelu will enter the championship in 2021, fielding the No. 44 Camaro for the full-season in Euro Series whilst maintaining plans to compete in V8 Thunder Cars. Later on 14 April 2021, it was revealed that the team will be running under the DF1 Racing banner for their debut season.
- RDV Competition and Team Bleekemolen will be returning to the championship after both teams were forced to withdraw from 2020 due to the effects of the COVID-19 pandemic. For the No. 3 RDV team, the team is set to run a EuroNASCAR FJ 2020-based chassis in 2021 after running a Chevrolet SS-based chassis in 2019.
- PK Carsport will be exiting the series after a seven-year stay to compete in both GT Rebellion Series and BMW M2 CS Racing Cup Benelux.
- DF1 Racing will be expanding into a five-car team in 2021 with the addition of both the No. 23 Camaro and the racinGPalvelu-prepared No. 44 Camaro. The No. 23 team will be competing under the Iceboys with DF1 Racing banner. Later, it was revealed through the Entry List of NASCAR GP Spain that DF1 Racing will renumber the No. 99 car into the No. 77 car.
- Not Only Motorsport will be expanding into a three-car team with the addition of the No. 90 and the No. 91 cars in 2021. The team previously fielded a part-time second car in the 2020 season-ending doubleheader round at Valencia.
- CAAL Racing will be downsizing into a three-car team in 2021.
- Hendriks Motorsport will be competing under the Hendriks Motorsport-MOMO banner in 2021 after it was announced that MOMO will become the team's title sponsor.
- Double V Racing, owned by Pierluigi Veronesi and Francesco Vignali, will be entering the series in 2021. The team will be fielding the No. 27 Ford Mustang with technical support from Solaris Motorsport.
- FEED Vict Racing will be rebranded into Vict Motorsport after Jacques Villeneuve and Patrick Lemarié's FEED Racing academy ended their co-ownership deal with the team.
- The Club Motorsport is scheduled to expand its racing program in 2021 after the team only competed in the season opening round at Vallelunga last year. The Club plans to enter a minimum of three rounds and could potentially compete for the full season.
- 42 Racing will be running a Shadow DNM8-based chassis in 2021, the first racing chassis to be entered under the Shadow Racing Cars name since the Shadow DN12 was last raced in the 1980 French Grand Prix.

==== Mid-season changes ====
- Igor Romanov was forced to miss NASCAR GP Spain at Circuit Ricardo Tormo after he was tested positive for COVID-19. Not Only Motorsport opted to not replace Romanov and withdrawn the No. 91 entry for Valencia.
- On 28 June 2021, it was announced that Alex Sedgwick will be returning to the series for American SpeedFest VIII at Brands Hatch. Sedgwick will drive the No. 24 Chevrolet for Academy Motorsport with sponsorship from NBA 2K, running a special Los Angeles Lakers livery in tribute to Kobe Bryant.
- Francesco Sini missed the British round due to paternity leave. He was not replaced, leaving Alina Loibnegger as the team's sole driver for the round at Brands Hatch.
- On 20 August 2021, it was announced that DF1 Racing signed Gil Linster to drive the team's No. 77 car in the EuroNASCAR 2 class starting from the third round at Autodrom Most.
- Team Bleekemolen's Renault Clio Cup driver Melvin de Groot replaced Michael Bleekemolen for the Croatian and Belgium rounds after Bleekemolen suffered a spinal injury caused by an accident in a race at Circuit de Spa-Francorchamps.
- Vict Motorsport expanded to a two-car team with the addition of Leonardo Colavita in the No. 9 team starting from the fourth round at Croatia. At the age of 16 years and 3 days, Colavita would become Euro Series' youngest ever driver – breaking the record previously set by Ben Creanor.
- On 21 September 2021, it was announced that RDV Competition's No. 3 team and Frédéric Gabillon will be withdrawing their entry for the rest of the year, citing a problematic new chassis and preparation for the 2022 season as their reason of withdrawal. Ulysse Delsaux will become RDV's sole driver for the rest of the season.
- On 3 October 2021, it was announced that PK Carsport will be returning to the series for the team's home race at Circuit Zolder, fielding the No. 11 Chevrolet for Stienes Longin and Pol van Pollaert.
- Loris Hezemans would skip the Belgium round to race for MBM Motorsports in the Drive for the Cure 250 at Charlotte Roval. Teammate Martin Doubek would replace Hezemans and compete in both classes as a result.
- On 7 October 2021, it was announced that Marc Goossens will be returning to CAAL Racing starting from the Belgium round, leaving DF1 Racing after just four rounds. Goossens will be set to drive the team's No. 56 Ford Mustang in the EuroNASCAR PRO class.
- On 27 October 2021, it was announced that Davide Amaduzzi will be returning to CAAL Racing to drive the No. 56 Ford Mustang in the EuroNASCAR PRO class at Vallelunga, marking his first race in the series after eight years.
- Vittorio Ghirelli switched teams for the final round of the season, leaving Hendriks Motorsport after two seasons to join Not Only Motorsport in the No. 90 team.

== Schedule ==
The provisional calendar for the 2021 season was announced on 20 November 2020. All races of the 2021 season will be held on road courses.

=== EuroNASCAR PRO ===
| Round | | Race title | Track | Date |
|---|---|---|---|---|
| 1 | R1 | NASCAR GP Spain – Valencia NASCAR Fest | (Spain) Circuit Ricardo Tormo, Valencia | 15 May |
| 1 | R2 | NASCAR GP Spain – Valencia NASCAR Fest | (Spain) Circuit Ricardo Tormo, Valencia | 16 May |
| 2 | R3 | NASCAR GP UK – American SpeedFest VIII | (United Kingdom) Brands Hatch, West Kingsdown | 3 July |
| 2 | R4 | NASCAR GP UK – American SpeedFest VIII | (United Kingdom) Brands Hatch, West Kingsdown | 4 July |
| 3 | R5 | NASCAR GP Czech Republic – OMV MaxxMotion NASCAR Show | (Czech Republic) Autodrom Most, Most | 28 August |
| 3 | R6 | NASCAR GP Czech Republic – OMV MaxxMotion NASCAR Show | (Czech Republic) Autodrom Most, Most | 29 August |
| 4 | R7 | Fracasso NASCAR GP Croatia | (Croatia) Automotodrom Grobnik, Čavle | 18 September |
| 4 | R8 | Fracasso NASCAR GP Croatia | (Croatia) Automotodrom Grobnik, Čavle | 19 September |
| 5 | R9 | NASCAR GP Belgium | (Belgium) Circuit Zolder, Heusden-Zolder | 9 October |
| 5 | R10 | NASCAR GP Belgium | (Belgium) Circuit Zolder, Heusden-Zolder | 10 October |
| 6 | R11 | NASCAR GP Italy - American Festival of Rome | (Italy) Autodromo di Vallelunga, Campagnano di Roma | 30 October |
| 6 | R12 | NASCAR GP Italy - American Festival of Rome | (Italy) Autodromo di Vallelunga, Campagnano di Roma | 31 October |

=== EuroNASCAR 2 ===
| Round | | Race title | Track | Date |
|---|---|---|---|---|
| 1 | R1 | NASCAR GP Spain – Valencia NASCAR Fest | (Spain) Circuit Ricardo Tormo, Valencia | 15 May |
| 1 | R2 | NASCAR GP Spain – Valencia NASCAR Fest | (Spain) Circuit Ricardo Tormo, Valencia | 16 May |
| 2 | R3 | NASCAR GP UK – American SpeedFest VIII | (United Kingdom) Brands Hatch, West Kingsdown | 3 July |
| 2 | R4 | NASCAR GP UK – American SpeedFest VIII | (United Kingdom) Brands Hatch, West Kingsdown | 4 July |
| 3 | R5 | NASCAR GP Czech Republic – OMV MaxxMotion NASCAR Show | (Czech Republic) Autodrom Most, Most | 28 August |
| 3 | R6 | NASCAR GP Czech Republic – OMV MaxxMotion NASCAR Show | (Czech Republic) Autodrom Most, Most | 29 August |
| 4 | R7 | Fracasso NASCAR GP Croatia | (Croatia) Automotodrom Grobnik, Čavle | 18 September |
| 4 | R8 | Fracasso NASCAR GP Croatia | (Croatia) Automotodrom Grobnik, Čavle | 19 September |
| 5 | R9 | NASCAR GP Belgium | (Belgium) Circuit Zolder, Heusden-Zolder | 9 October |
| 5 | R10 | NASCAR GP Belgium | (Belgium) Circuit Zolder, Heusden-Zolder | 10 October |
| 6 | R11 | NASCAR GP Italy - American Festival of Rome | (Italy) Autodromo di Vallelunga, Campagnano di Roma | 30 October |
| 6 | R12 | NASCAR GP Italy - American Festival of Rome | (Italy) Autodromo di Vallelunga, Campagnano di Roma | 31 October |

=== EuroNASCAR Club Challenge ===
| Round | Race title | Track | Date |
|---|---|---|---|
| R1 | NASCAR GP Spain – Valencia NASCAR Fest | (Spain) Circuit Ricardo Tormo, Valencia | 14 May |
| R2 | NASCAR GP Czech Republic – OMV MaxxMotion NASCAR Show | (Czech Republic) Autodrom Most, Most | 27 August |
| R3 | Fracasso NASCAR GP Croatia | (Croatia) Automotodrom Grobnik, Čavle | 17 September |
| R4 | NASCAR GP Belgium | (Belgium) Circuit Zolder, Heusden-Zolder | 8 October |
| R5 | NASCAR GP Italy - American Festival of Rome | (Italy) Autodromo di Vallelunga, Campagnano di Roma | 30 October |

=== Calendar changes ===
- On 3 November 2020, it was announced that American SpeedFest, NASCAR Whelen Euro Series' round at Brands Hatch, will return to the calendar this year after the round was cancelled last year due to the COVID-19 pandemic. The SpeedFest is scheduled to be held on 3–4 July, coinciding with the Independence Day weekend.
- NASCAR GP Spain at Circuit Ricardo Tormo will return to its original spot as the first round of the season. Last year, the round hosted the fourth and fifth rounds of the season as part of the one-off Valencia Super Speedweek event due to the schedule changes caused by the COVID-19 pandemic.
- NASCAR GP Italy at Autodromo di Vallelunga returned to its previous spot in the calendar as the second round of the season. It was initially scheduled to become the fifth round of the 2020 season, but the pandemic schedule changes meant that it hosted the season opening round instead.
- NASCAR GP Croatia at Automotodrom Grobnik, which was added into the calendar as a last-minute replacement for NASCAR GP Czech Republic last year, becomes a permanent addition to the calendar for 2021. It is scheduled to host the sixth round of the season.
- The NASCAR GP Czech Republic at Automotodrom Most and NASCAR GP Germany at Hockenheimring all returned to the schedule after their rounds were cancelled due to the COVID-19 pandemic. It is scheduled to host the third and fifth round of the season respectively.
- NASCAR GP Netherlands at Raceway Venray, whose round last year was cancelled due to the pandemic, will not return despite the track having a contract to host a NASCAR Whelen Euro Series round until 2022.
- NASCAR GP Belgium at Zolder will host the season ending round once again, with the round as Zolder acting as the sole double-points Playoff round of the season.

=== Schedule changes due to the COVID-19 pandemic ===
- On 22 February 2021, it was announced that NASCAR GP Spain at Circuit Ricardo Tormo will be postponed to the date initially given to NASCAR GP Italy due to the ongoing COVID restrictions in Europe while NASCAR GP Italy will be postponed to fall as the new final round of the season on a currently unannounced date. The remaining five rounds of the season will move one spot ahead as a result.
- On 21 May 2021, NASCAR Whelen Euro Series announced the following revisions to the 2021 season calendar.
  - NASCAR GP Czech Republic at Autodrom Most will be postponed to 28–29 August due to the restrictions that were in place. American Speedfest will become the second round of the season as a result,
  - NASCAR GP Germany at Hockenheim will be cancelled due to the restrictions in place in Germany. The round will be scheduled to return in 2022.
  - After it was previously announced that NASCAR GP Italy at Vallelunga will be held as the new final round on an unannounced date, it was revealed that NASCAR GP Italy is now scheduled to be held on 30–31 October. With the cancellation of the round at Hockenheim, Vallelunga is also going to be scheduled to host the final round of the Club Challenge division.

== Rule changes ==
- On 22 January 2021, it was announced that Hoosier Racing Tire will become the exclusive tyre supplier of the series on a seven-year contract, replacing General Tire as the tyre supplier after Hoosier and General Tire's parent company Continental AG extended their tyre supply contract with the series until 2027.
- On 25 March 2021, it was announced that teams will have an option to use sequential gearboxes starting from this year, making Euro Series the first NASCAR series to introduce sequential gearboxes.
- On 12 May 2021, NASCAR Whelen Euro Series announced the following sporting regulation changes that will be introduced in the 2021 season.
  - Only the best ten results from the first twelve races and all results from the final round of the season were counted towards a driver's total in the drivers' championship.
  - A success handicap will be implemented in Race 2. Drivers who scored a podium finish in Race 1 will receive a grid penalty for Race 2 after the grid was initially set through the ordering of fastest lap in Race 1. The Race 1 winner would receive a three-place grid penalty, while second and third-place finishers would receive a two and one place grid penalty respectively.
  - The three fastest drivers in Qualifying would receive championship points. The pole sitter would receive three championship points, while second and third would award two points and one point respectively.
  - The allocation of slick tires for each driver would be increased from 20 to 22. A driver would receive 4 new tires at Valencia, Most, Hockenheim, and Zolder, while 2 new tires would be given at Vallelunga, Brands Hatch, and Rijeka.
- Following an open meeting between the series and team owners before the season opening round at Valencia, it was announced on 13 May 2021 that NASCAR Whelen Euro Series will reverse its decision on the planned introduction of success handicap and championship points being awarded during Qualifying, with Qualifying and Race 2's grid ordering rules being reverted to the system that has been used previously.

== Results ==
=== EuroNASCAR PRO ===
| Round | | Race | Pole position | Fastest lap | Most laps led | Winning driver | Winning manufacturer |
|---|---|---|---|---|---|---|---|
| 1 | R1 | Valencia NASCAR Fest | (Netherlands) Loris Hezemans | (Netherlands) Loris Hezemans | (Netherlands) Loris Hezemans | (Netherlands) Loris Hezemans | Ford |
| 1 | R2 | Valencia NASCAR Fest | (Netherlands) Loris Hezemans | (Switzerland) Giorgio Maggi | (Netherlands) Loris Hezemans | (Netherlands) Loris Hezemans | Ford |
| 2 | R3 | American Speedfest VIII | (Israel) Alon Day | (Netherlands) Loris Hezemans | (Israel) Alon Day | (Israel) Alon Day | Chevrolet |
| 2 | R4 | American Speedfest VIII | (Netherlands) Loris Hezemans | (Netherlands) Loris Hezemans | (Netherlands) Loris Hezemans | (Netherlands) Loris Hezemans | Ford |
| 3 | R5 | OMV MaxxMotion NASCAR Show | (Netherlands) Loris Hezemans | (Italy) Vittorio Ghirelli | (Israel) Alon Day | (Israel) Alon Day | Chevrolet |
| 3 | R6 | OMV MaxxMotion NASCAR Show | (Italy) Vittorio Ghirelli | (Italy) Vittorio Ghirelli | (Italy) Vittorio Ghirelli | (Italy) Vittorio Ghirelli | Ford |
| 4 | R7 | Fracasso NASCAR GP Croatia | (Netherlands) Loris Hezemans | (Netherlands) Loris Hezemans | (Italy) Gianmarco Ercoli | (Netherlands) Loris Hezemans (Note: Gianmarco Ercoli originally won the race, but he was stripped of the win after receiving a 10-second penalty post-race for start procedure infringements.) | Ford |
| 4 | R8 | Fracasso NASCAR GP Croatia | (Netherlands) Loris Hezemans | (Netherlands) Loris Hezemans | (Italy) Gianmarco Ercoli | (Italy) Gianmarco Ercoli | Chevrolet |
| 5 | R9 | NASCAR GP Belgium | (Belgium) Stienes Longin | (Israel) Alon Day | (Belgium) Stienes Longin | (Belgium) Stienes Longin | Chevrolet |
| 5 | R10 | NASCAR GP Belgium | (Israel) Alon Day | (Italy) Gianmarco Ercoli | (Israel) Alon Day | (Israel) Alon Day | Chevrolet |
| 6 | R11 | American Festival of Rome | (Israel) Alon Day | (Canada) Jacques Villeneuve | (Canada) Jacques Villeneuve | (Canada) Jacques Villeneuve | EuroNASCAR FJ 2020 |
| 6 | R12 | American Festival of Rome | (Canada) Jacques Villeneuve | (Israel) Alon Day | (Canada) Jacques Villeneuve (Netherlands) Loris Hezemans (Note: Villeneuve and Hezemans both led 9 laps.) | (Canada) Jacques Villeneuve | EuroNASCAR FJ 2020 |

=== EuroNASCAR 2 ===
| Round | | Race | Pole position | Fastest lap | Most laps led | Winning driver | Winning manufacturer |
|---|---|---|---|---|---|---|---|
| 1 | R1 | Valencia NASCAR Fest | (Czech Republic) Martin Doubek | (Czech Republic) Martin Doubek | (Czech Republic) Martin Doubek | (Czech Republic) Martin Doubek | Ford |
| 1 | R2 | Valencia NASCAR Fest | (Czech Republic) Martin Doubek | (Czech Republic) Martin Doubek | (Czech Republic) Martin Doubek | (Czech Republic) Martin Doubek | Ford |
| 2 | R3 | American Speedfest VIII | (India) Advait Deodhar | (India) Advait Deodhar | (India) Advait Deodhar | (India) Advait Deodhar | Ford |
| 2 | R4 | American Speedfest VIII | (India) Advait Deodhar | (Belgium) Simon Pilate | (Germany) Tobias Dauenhauer | (Germany) Tobias Dauenhauer | Ford |
| 3 | R5 | OMV MaxxMotion NASCAR Show | (Germany) Tobias Dauenhauer | (Germany) Tobias Dauenhauer | (Germany) Tobias Dauenhauer | (Germany) Tobias Dauenhauer | Ford |
| 3 | R6 | OMV MaxxMotion NASCAR Show | (Germany) Tobias Dauenhauer | (Israel) Naveh Talor | (Germany) Tobias Dauenhauer | (Germany) Tobias Dauenhauer | Ford |
| 4 | R7 | Fracasso NASCAR GP Croatia | (Germany) Tobias Dauenhauer | (Germany) Tobias Dauenhauer | (Germany) Tobias Dauenhauer | (Czech Republic) Martin Doubek | Ford |
| 4 | R8 | Fracasso NASCAR GP Croatia | (Germany) Tobias Dauenhauer | (Germany) Tobias Dauenhauer | (Germany) Tobias Dauenhauer | (Germany) Tobias Dauenhauer | Ford |
| 5 | R9 | NASCAR GP Belgium | (Cyprus) Vladimiros Tziortzis | (Germany) Tobias Dauenhauer | (Israel) Naveh Talor | (Israel) Naveh Talor | Chevrolet |
| 5 | R10 | NASCAR GP Belgium | (Germany) Tobias Dauenhauer | (Israel) Naveh Talor | (Czech Republic) Martin Doubek | (Czech Republic) Martin Doubek | Ford |
| 6 | R11 | American Festival of Rome | (Germany) Tobias Dauenhauer | (Germany) Tobias Dauenhauer | (Germany) Tobias Dauenhauer | (Germany) Tobias Dauenhauer | Ford |
| 6 | R12 | American Festival of Rome | (Germany) Tobias Dauenhauer | (Czech Republic) Martin Doubek | (Czech Republic) Martin Doubek | (Czech Republic) Martin Doubek | Ford |

== Standings ==
Points are awarded to drivers and team using the current point system used in NASCAR Cup Series, NASCAR Xfinity Series, and NASCAR Camping World Truck Series, excluding the Stage and Race Winner bonus points. For the final round at Vallelunga, double points are awarded. In addition, the driver that gained the most positions in a race will receive bonus championship points. Only the best 8 results from the first 10 races and the results from the double-points rewarding final round at Vallelunga will count towards the final standings in the drivers championship.

=== EuroNASCAR PRO ===
(key) Bold - Pole position awarded by fastest qualifying time (in Race 1) or by previous race's fastest lap (in Race 2). Italics - Fastest lap. * – Most laps led. ^ – Most positions gained.

| Pos | Driver | (Spain) ESP | | (United Kingdom) GBR | | (Czech Republic) CZE | | (Croatia) CRO | | (Belgium) BEL | | (Italy) ITA | | Points |
|---|---|---|---|---|---|---|---|---|---|---|---|---|---|---|
| 1 | (Netherlands) Loris Hezemans | **1*** | **1*** | 2 | **1*** | **8** | 2 | **1** | **2** | | | 10 | 5* | 412 |
| 2 | (Italy) Gianmarco Ercoli | 3 | 2 | 6 | 2 | 2 | (12) | 10* | 1* | (21) | 8^ | 3 | 2 | 409 (449) |
| 3 | (France) Lucas Lasserre | 8 | 6 | (12) | 7 | 9 | 5 | 4 | (11) | 2 | 3 | 5^ | 4 | 399 (441) |
| 4 | (Italy) Nicolò Rocca | 2 | 5 | 3 | (8) | 5 | (10) | 7 | 7 | 5 | 4 | 4 | 6 | 394 (450) |
| 5 | (Italy) Vittorio Ghirelli | (6) | 4 | 4 | (6) | 4 | **1*** | 2 | 4 | 4 | 5 | 2 | 19 | 381 (442) |
| 6 | (Israel) Alon Day | 5 | (19) | **1*** | (19) | 1* | 17 | 5 | 3 | 17 | **1*** | **19** | 3 | 367 (402) |
| 7 | (Switzerland) Giorgio Maggi | (24) | 8 | 8 | 4^ | 7 | 6 | 18 | (23) | 7 | 6 | 6 | 8 | 357 (383) |
| 8 | (Netherlands) Sebastiaan Bleekemolen | (19) | 3 | 5 | 3 | 10 | 3 | (12) | 9 | 8 | 10 | 10 | 21 | 338 (380) |
| 9 | (Canada) Jacques Villeneuve | 7 | 9 | | | 11 | 4 | 3 | 17 | | | 1* | **1*** | 331 |
| 10 | (Finland) Henri Tuomaala | 15 | (23) | 14 | 12 | 12 | 9 | 16 | (20) | 14 | 17 | 12 | 11 | 291 (320) |
| 11 | (Italy) Davide Dallara | 14 | 16 | 15 | 13 | (24) | 18 | (22) | 14 | 10 | 14 | 11 | 15 | 281 (299) |
| 12 | (Ukraine) Evgeny Sokolovsky | 16 | 15^ | 16 | (18) | 15 | 14 | 15 | 15 | (18) | 16 | 14 | 16 | 271 (308) |
| 13 | (Italy) Francesco Sini | 22 | 17 | | | 21 | 23 | 17 | 5 | 11^ | 8 | 16 | 10 | 261 |
| 14 | (Belgium) Marc Goossens | 9 | 10 | 11 | (16) | 3^ | (11) | 8 | 7 | 3 | 2 | | | 248 (295) |
| 15 | (Italy) Bernardo Manfrè | 18 | 18 | 17 | 14 | 23 | 21 | 23 | 16^ | | | 20 | 13 | 235 |
| 16 | (Italy) Dario Caso | 21 | 14 | | | 19 | 16 | 21 | 22 | 13 | 15 | 21 | 18 | 233 |
| 17 | (Italy) Federico Monti | | | 18 | 15 | 22 | DNS^{2} | 19 | 18 | 16 | 20 | 15 | 17 | 229 |
| 18 | (France) Patrick Lemarié | 23 | DNS^{1} | | | 20 | 19 | 11 | 21 | 6 | 18 | 8 | DNS^{5} | 223 |
| 19 | (France) Ulysse Delsaux | 13 | 12 | (13) | 11 | (13) | 8 | 9^ | 10 | 9 | 11 | Wth | Wth | 218 (265) |
| 20 | (France) Romain Iannetta | | | | | 17 | 15 | 6 | 8 | | | 9 | 7 | 217 |
| 21 | (Italy) Leonardo Colavita | | | | | | | 14 | 13 | 19 | 13 | 18 | 9 | 189 |
| 22 | (France) Frédéric Gabillon | 11 | 11 | 7 | 10 | 6 | 7 | | | | | | | 170 |
| 23 | (Italy) Fabrizio Armetta | 20 | 13 | | | | | 13 | 12 | | | 22 | 12^ | 156 |
| 24 | (Italy) Davide Amaduzzi | | | | | | | | | | | 13 | 14 | 138 |
| 25 | (Finland) Luka Nurmi | | | | | | | | | | | 17 | 20 | 118 |
| 26 | (Finland) Ian Eric Wadén | 17 | 21 | | | 18 | 20 | | | 22 | DNS^{3} | | | 92 |
| 27 | (Italy) Andrea Nori | 12^ | 22 | | | 14 | 22 | | | | | | | 82 |
| 28 | (Italy) Nicolò Gabossi | | | | | | | 20 | 19 | 15 | 19 | | | 77 |
| 29 | (Belgium) Stienes Longin | | | | | | | | | **1*** | 7 | | | 70 |
| 30 | (France) Thomas Ferrando | 4 | 7 | | | | | | | | | | | 63 |
| 31 | (Sweden) Alexander Graff | | | 10 | 9 | | | | | | | | | 55 |
| 32 | (Belgium) Simon Pilate | | | 9^ | 17 | | | | | Wth | Wth | | | 52 |
| 33 | (Slovakia) Michaela Dorcikova | | | | | 16 | 13^ | | | | | | | 49 |
| 34 | (United Kingdom) Alex Sedgwick | | | 21 | 5 | | | | | | | | | 48 |
| 35 | (Italy) Luigi Ferrara | 10 | 20 | | | | | | | | | | | 44 |
| 36 | (Czech Republic) Martin Doubek | | | | | | | | | 20 | 12 | | | 42 |
| 37 | (France) Pierre Combot | | | | | | | | | 12 | DNS^{4} | | | 34 |
| 38 | (Ukraine) Igor Romanov | | | 19 | 21 | | | | | | | | | 34 |
| 39 | (United Kingdom) Scott Jeffs | | | 20 | 20 | | | | | | | | | 34 |

Notes

- ^{1} – Patrick Lemarié received 4 championship points despite being a non-starter.
- ^{2} – Federico Monti received 8 championship points despite being a non-starter.
- ^{3} – Ian Eric Wadén received 7 championship points despite being a non-starter.
- ^{4} – Pierre Combot received 9 championship points despite being a non-starter.
- ^{5} – Patrick Lemarié received 18 championship points despite being a non-starter.

=== EuroNASCAR 2 ===
(key) Bold - Pole position awarded by fastest qualifying time (in Race 1) or by previous race's fastest lap (in Race 2). Italics - Fastest lap. * – Most laps led. ^ – Most positions gained.

| Pos | Driver | (Spain) ESP | | (United Kingdom) GBR | | (Czech Republic) CZE | | (Croatia) CRO | | (Belgium) BEL | | (Italy) ITA | | Points |
|---|---|---|---|---|---|---|---|---|---|---|---|---|---|---|
| 1 | (Czech Republic) Martin Doubek | **1*** | **1*** | 6 | (13) | 3 | (19) | 1 | 2 | 2 | 1* | 2 | 1* | 445 (487) |
| 2 | (Germany) Tobias Dauenhauer | 3 | 2 | 2 | 1* | **1*** | **1*** | (**6**)* | **1*** | 3 | (**4**) | **1*** | **13** | 428 (489) |
| 3 | (Israel) Naveh Talor | 6^ | 12 | 10 | 4 | (19) | 6 | (20) | 7^ | 1* | 7 | 10 | 2 | 381 (416) |
| 4 | (Germany) Justin Kunz | (21) | 4 | 5 | 7 | 18 | 4 | 3 | 5 | (23) | 5 | 5 | 3 | 377 (407) |
| 5 | (Italy) Francesco Garisto | 8 | 13 | 7 | 14 | 6 | 2 | 8 | 10 | (18) | (19) | 3 | 4 | 362 (399) |
| 6 | (Cyprus) Vladimiros Tziortzis | 2 | 3 | (9) | 5 | (20) | 3^ | 2 | 4 | **5** | 2 | 15 | 18 | 360 (405) |
| 7 | (Italy) Pierluigi Veronesi | 4 | 5 | 8 | 8 | 11 | (21) | (19) | 12 | 6 | 8 | 14 | 5 | 347 (379) |
| 8 | (Belgium) Simon Pilate | (18) | 6 | 3 | 2 | 5 | 15 | 16 | 3 | 9 | (18) | 4 | 21 | 334 (371) |
| 9 | (Italy) Max Lanza | 5 | (21) | 11 | 12 | 7 | 8 | 10 | (17) | 10 | 13 | 9 | 11 | 333 (368) |
| 10 | (Italy) Alberto Panebianco | 9 | 8 | 4 | 11 | 10^ | (12) | 4 | 11 | (13) | 6 | 13 | 19 | 326 (375) |
| 11 | (Finland) Leevi Lintukanto | 12 | (DNS)^{1} | (21) | 10 | 4 | 14 | 13 | 6 | 21 | 21 | 6 | 7 | 319 (338) |
| 12 | (India) Advait Deodhar | (17) | 7 | **1*** | **3** | 2 | (20) | 5 | 14 | 4 | 16 | 21 | 20 | 318 (355) |
| 13 | (Greece) Thomas Krasonis | 7 | (22) | 20 | 9^ | (DNS)^{2} | 18 | 14 | 16 | 12 | 12 | 12 | 10 | 305 (322) |
| 14 | (Ukraine) Evgeny Sokolovsky | 10 | 10 | 12 | (15) | 8 | (17) | 12 | 15 | 11 | 10 | 17 | 12 | 303 (344) |
| 15 | (Portugal) Miguel Gomes | 14 | 14 | 16 | (18) | 13 | 9 | 15 | 18 | 15^ | (23) | 11 | 14 | 289 (321) |
| 16 | (Italy) Paolo Valeri | 20 | 9 | | | 9 | 16 | 21 | 20 | 14 | 22 | 16 | 9 | 275 |
| 17 | (France) Eric Quintal | 15 | 20 | | | 16 | 13 | 18 | 21 | 16 | 14 | 18 | 15 | 251 |
| 18 | (Italy) Arianna Casoli | 13 | 18 | 17 | 20 | 15 | 10 | | | 19 | 15^ | 20 | 17 | 248 |
| 19 | (Italy) Leonardo Colavita | | | | | | | 11 | 13 | 8 | 9 | 7 | 6 | 230 |
| 20 | (Austria) Alina Loibnegger | 16 | 19 | 19 | 19 | 14 | 11 | 17 | (19) | 17 | (20) | 19 | 16 | 227 (261) |
| 21 | (Italy) Alfredo de Matteo | | | | | | | | | | | 8^ | 8^ | 166 |
| 22 | (Finland) Ian Eric Wadén | 11 | 17 | 13 | 16 | 12 | 7 | | | DNS^{3} | 24 | | | 163 |
| 23 | (Luxembourg) Gil Linster | | | | | 17 | 5 | 9^ | 9 | 20 | 11 | | | 156 |
| 24 | (Netherlands) Melvin de Groot | | | | | | | 7 | 8 | 22 | 3 | | | 109 |
| 25 | (Finland) Ossi Peltola | | | | | | | | | | | 22 | DNS | 80 |
| 26 | (Netherlands) Michael Bleekemolen | DNS^{1} | 15^ | 14 | 21 | Wth | Wth | | | | | | | 70 |
| 27 | (United Kingdom) Shaun Hollamby | | | 15^ | 6 | | | | | | | | | 57 |
| 28 | (Belgium) Pol van Pollaert | | | | | | | | | 7 | 17 | | | 50 |
| 29 | (Italy) Fabrizio Armetta | 22 | 11 | | | | | | | | | Wth | Wth | 41 |
| 30 | (France) Didier Bec | 19 | 16 | | | | | | | | | | | 39 |
| 31 | (Germany) Matthias Hauer | | | 18 | 17 | | | | | | | | | 39 |
| | (Italy) Bernardo Manfrè | DNS^{4} | DNS^{4} | | | | | | | | | | | 0 |

Notes

- ^{1} – Michael Bleekemolen and Leevi Lintukanto received 5 championship points each despite being a non-starter.
- ^{2} – Thomas Krasonis received 7 championship points despite being a non-starter.
- ^{3} – Ian Eric Wadén received 4 championship points despite being a non-starter.
- ^{4} – Bernardo Manfrè originally received 5 championship points each despite being a non-starter, but the points were subsequently revoked after the final round at Vallelunga.

=== Team's Championship (Top 15) ===
| Pos | No. | Team | Body Style | EuroNASCAR PRO Driver(s) | EuroNASCAR 2 Driver(s) | Points |
|---|---|---|---|---|---|---|
| 1 | 7 | (Netherlands) Hendriks Motorsport-MOMO | Ford | (Netherlands) Loris Hezemans | (Czech Republic) Martin Doubek | 969 |
| 2 | 22 | (Austria) DF1 Racing | Chevrolet | (Italy) Nicolò Rocca | (Germany) Justin Kunz | 875 |
| 3 | 50 | (Netherlands) Hendriks Motorsport-MOMO | Ford | (Italy) Vittorio Ghirelli | (Germany) Tobias Dauenhauer | 867 |
| 4 | 88 | (Italy) CAAL Racing | Chevrolet | (Israel) Alon Day | (Italy) Max Lanza | 787 |
| 5 | 64 | (France) Speedhouse | Ford | (France) Lucas Lasserre | (France) Eric Quintal (Germany) Matthias Hauer | 777 |
| 6 | 90 | (Italy) Not Only Motorsport | Chevrolet | (Italy) Andrea Nori (Ukraine) Igor Romanov (Italy) Nicolò Gabossi (Italy) Vittorio Ghirelli | (Israel) Naveh Talor | 738 |
| 7 | 54 | (Italy) CAAL Racing | Chevrolet | (Italy) Gianmarco Ercoli | (Italy) Arianna Casoli | 729 |
| 8 | 89 | (Italy) Not Only Motorsport | Chevrolet | (Italy) Davide Dallara | (Italy) Alberto Panebianco | 704 |
| 9 | 23 | (Finland) Iceboys with DF1 Racing | Chevrolet 3 Ford 3 | (Finland) Henri Tuomaala | (Finland) Leevi Lintukanto | 692 |
| 10 | 48 | (Germany) Marko Stipp Motorsport | Chevrolet | (Ukraine) Evgeny Sokolovsky | (Ukraine) Evgeny Sokolovsky | 677 |
| 11 | 66 | (Austria) DF1 Racing | Chevrolet | (France) Patrick Lemarié (Belgium) Simon Pilate | (Belgium) Simon Pilate | 627 |
| 12 | 46 | (Germany) Marko Stipp Motorsport | Chevrolet | (United Kingdom) Scott Jeffs (France) Romain Iannetta (France) Pierre Combot | (Portugal) Miguel Gomes | 626 |
| 13 | 69 | (Netherlands) Team Bleekemolen | Ford | (Netherlands) Sebastiaan Bleekemolen | (Netherlands) Michael Bleekemolen (Netherlands) Melvin de Groot | 574 |
| 14 | 2 | (Italy) Academy Motorsport | EuroNASCAR FJ | (Italy) Federico Monti | (Greece) Thomas Krasonis | 556 |
| 15 | 1 | (Italy) Academy Motorsport | Ford | (France) Thomas Ferrando (Slovakia) Michaela Dorcikova | (Cyprus) Vladimiros Tziortzis | 549 |
| Pos | No. | Team | Body Style | EuroNASCAR PRO Driver(s) | EuroNASCAR 2 Driver(s) | Points |

== See also ==
- 2021 NASCAR Cup Series
- 2021 NASCAR Xfinity Series
- 2021 NASCAR Camping World Truck Series
- 2021 ARCA Menards Series
- 2021 ARCA Menards Series East
- 2021 ARCA Menards Series West
- 2021 NASCAR Whelen Modified Tour
- 2021 NASCAR Pinty's Series
- 2021 eNASCAR iRacing Pro Invitational Series
- 2021 SRX Series
- 2021 Southern Modified Auto Racing Teams season
