= Loris Hezemans =

Belgium-Dutch auto racing driver

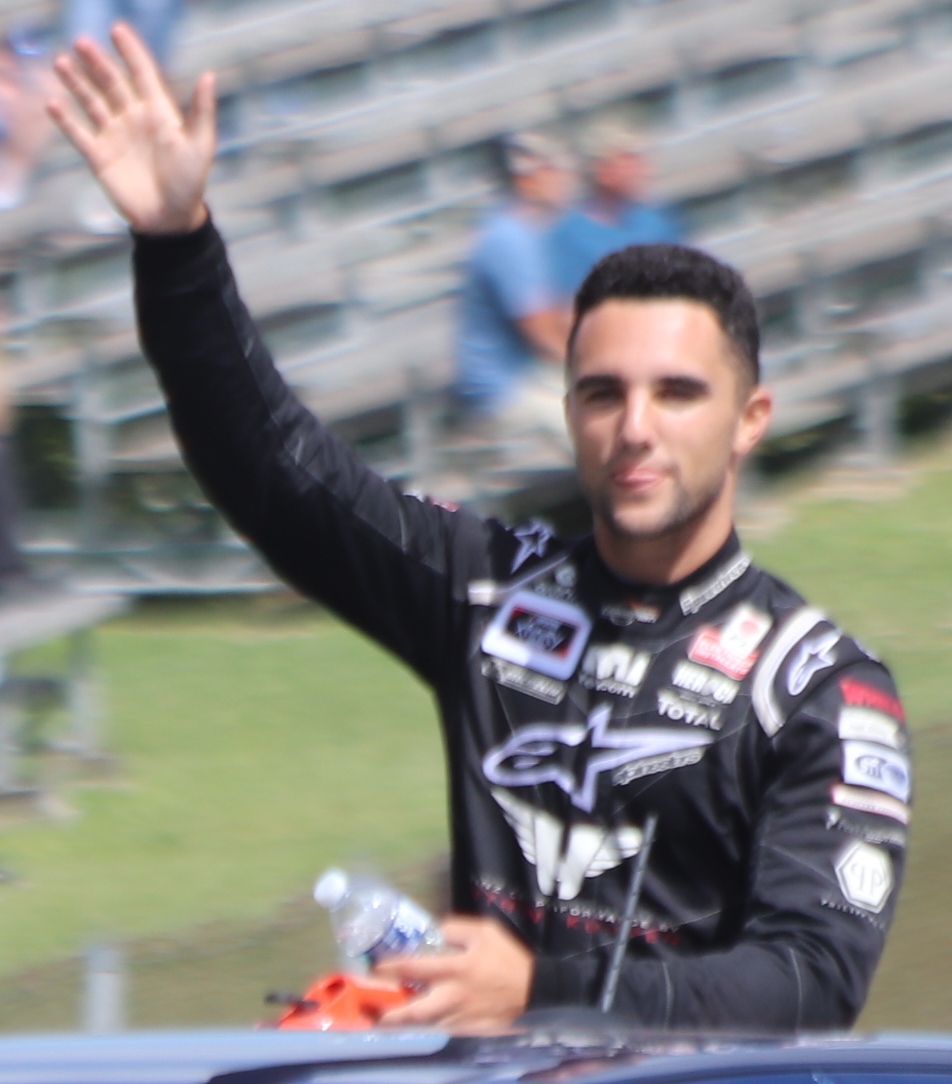
- Hezemans at Road America in 2019
- Nationality: Dutch
- Born: 26 May 1997 (age 29) Amsterdam, Netherlands
- Relatives: Toine Hezemans (father); Mike Hezemans (brother); Liam Hezemans (brother)

NASCAR Whelen Euro Series career
- Debut season: 2018
- Current team: Hendriks Motorsport
- Categorisation: FIA Silver
- Car number: 7
- Starts: 45
- Championships: 2 (2019, 2021)
- Wins: 11
- Poles: 8
- Fastest laps: 10
- Finished last season: 1st in 2021

Previous series
- 2017–2018 2015–2016 2015 2015 2014—15: Blancpain GT Series Sprint Cup; TCR International Series; Audi Sport TT Cup; SEAT León Eurocup; Renault Clio Cup Benelux

Championship titles
- 2019, 2021: NASCAR Whelen Euro Series

NASCAR Cup Series career
- 5 races run over 1 year
- 2022 position: 59th
- Best finish: 59th (2022)
- First race: 2022 Texas Grand Prix (Austin)
- Last race: 2022 Bank of America Roval 400 (Charlotte Roval)
Wins	Top tens	Poles
0	0	0

NASCAR O'Reilly Auto Parts Series career
- 6 races run over 3 years
- 2022 position: 107th
- Best finish: 62nd (2021)
- First race: 2019 CTECH Manufacturing 180 (Road America)
- Last race: 2022 Nalley Cars 250 (Atlanta)
Wins	Top tens	Poles
0	0	0

NASCAR FedEx Freight Truck Series career
- 1 race run over 1 year
- 2022 position: 59th
- Best finish: 59th (2022)
- First race: 2022 Victoria's Voice Foundation 200 (Las Vegas)
Wins	Top tens	Poles
0	0	0
- Statistics up to date as of 7 November 2022.

Loris Hezemans (born 26 May 1997) is a Dutch professional racing driver. He last competed full-time in the GT World Challenge Europe, driving the No. 12 Audi R8 LMS GT3 for Comtoyou Racing, part-time in the NASCAR Cup Series, driving the No. 27 Ford Mustang for Team Hezeberg, part-time in the NASCAR Xfinity Series driving the No. 33 Toyota Supra for DGM Racing, and part-time in the NASCAR Camping World Truck Series driving the No. 33 for Reaume Brothers Racing.

Hezemans is the 2019 and 2021 champion of the NASCAR Whelen Euro Series. He previously competed in the SEAT León Eurocup, Renault Clio Cup Benelux, TCR International Series, and Blancpain GT Series Sprint Cup. In 2017, he started in the McLaren GT Driver Academy in the Blancpain GT Sprint Series.

== Racing career ==
Hezemans began his career in 2014 in Renault Clio Cup Benelux, where he finished sixth in the standings. In 2015 he switched to the Audi Sport TT Cup, and finished seventh in the championship standings. That year he also took part in the SEAT León Eurocup, he qualified on pole position for his first-ever race and went on to win the race. In July 2015, it was announced that Hezemans would make his TCR International Series debut with Target Competition driving a SEAT León Cup Racer.

Hezemans switched to sports car racing Blancpain GT Series Sprint Cup in 2017, driving for Strakka Racing in a part-time campaign before making his full-time debut for GRT Grasser Racing Team in 2018. Originally scheduled to compete in all races, he ultimately opted to skip the season finale round at Nürburgring to focus on his NASCAR Whelen Euro Series title campaign.

Hezemans made his stock car racing debut in the NASCAR Whelen Euro Series as he became the driver for Hendriks Motorsport in the Elite 1 class. He scored his first pole position at Hockenheim before he picked up his first career win at the same venue on the Saturday race having led the race from the start to the finish. He finished the year fourth in the standings and won the Junior Trophy classification for drivers aged 25 and under to win an opportunity to race in the United States.

Hezemans made his racing debut in the United States the following year when he took part in the 2019 edition of the World Series of Asphalt Stock Car Racing at New Smyrna Speedway, driving for Mike Skinner's team ATF & Gunslinger. He scored three top-five and six top-ten finishes to finish third overall in the Pro Late Model category at the World Series. Later in the year, he would score his first victory in an oval when he won at his home race at Raceway Venray.

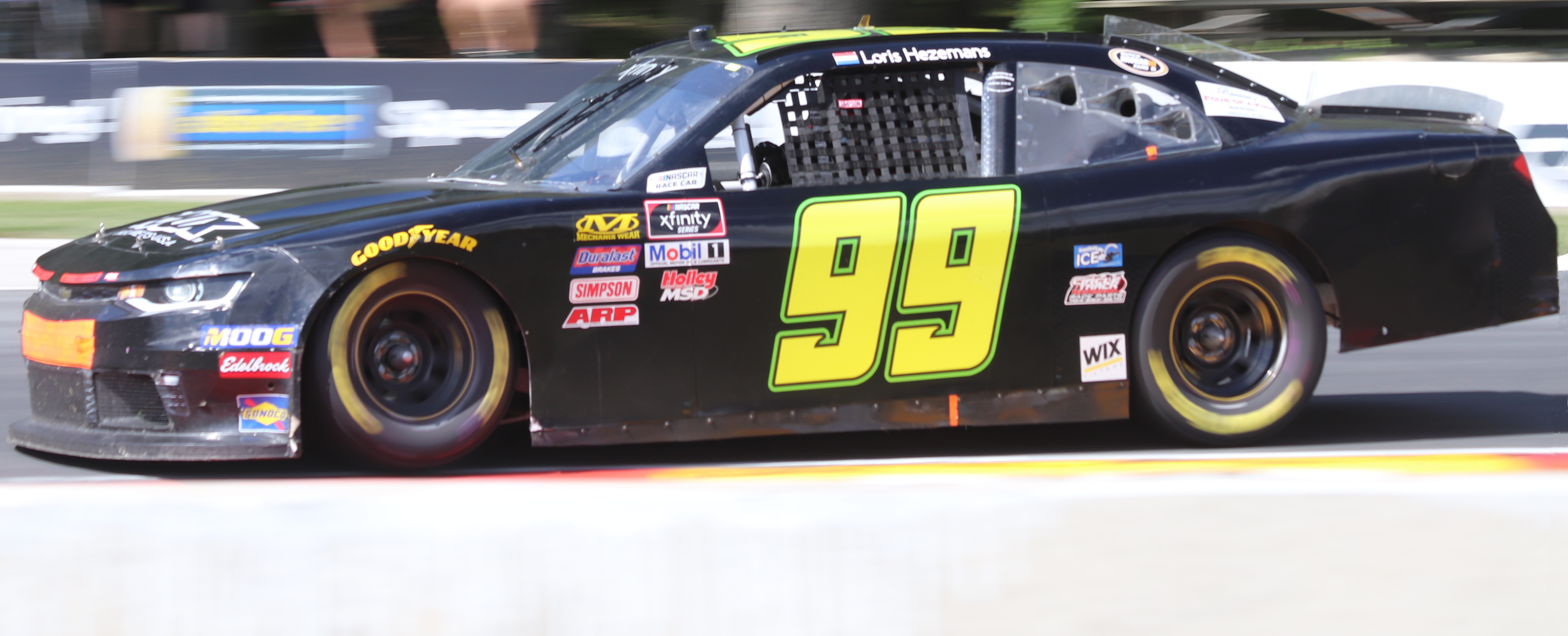
Hezemans' Xfinity debut at Road America in 2019

On 21 August 2019, it was announced that Hezemans would be making his NASCAR Xfinity Series debut for B. J. McLeod Motorsports at the CTECH Manufacturing 180 in Road America. He finished in 22nd place, with a power steering failure and a crash on the final restart preventing Hezemans from scoring a top-fifteen finish in his Xfinity Series debut.

In September, Hezemans took the lead in the Euro Series championship after he scored the victory in both races at Hockenheim before he clinched his first Euro Series championship title in October after he started the rain-affected final race of the season at Circuit Zolder. He finished the 2019 season with four wins, six podium finishes, and eleven top-ten finishes.

An injury to his right hand slightly dampened Hezemans' performance in the early stages of the 2020 NASCAR Whelen Euro Series season. He finished the year in third place after winning the season-opening round at Vallelunga and the season ending round at Valencia.

In 2021, Hezemans would return to the United States to race in the two Xfinity Series races, which would be his first start on ovals. He competed in the races at Phoenix in March and Charlotte in May, both in the No. 13 for MBM Motorsports, which was fielded in a partnership with Reaume Brothers Racing for these races. He also drove for the No. 90 for DGM at Pocono, the No. 33 for Reaume at IRC, No. 66 for MBM at Roval, and the No. 61 for Hattori at Kansas, all were which entries were collaborated with Reaume, except for IRC, in which he drove for Reaume.

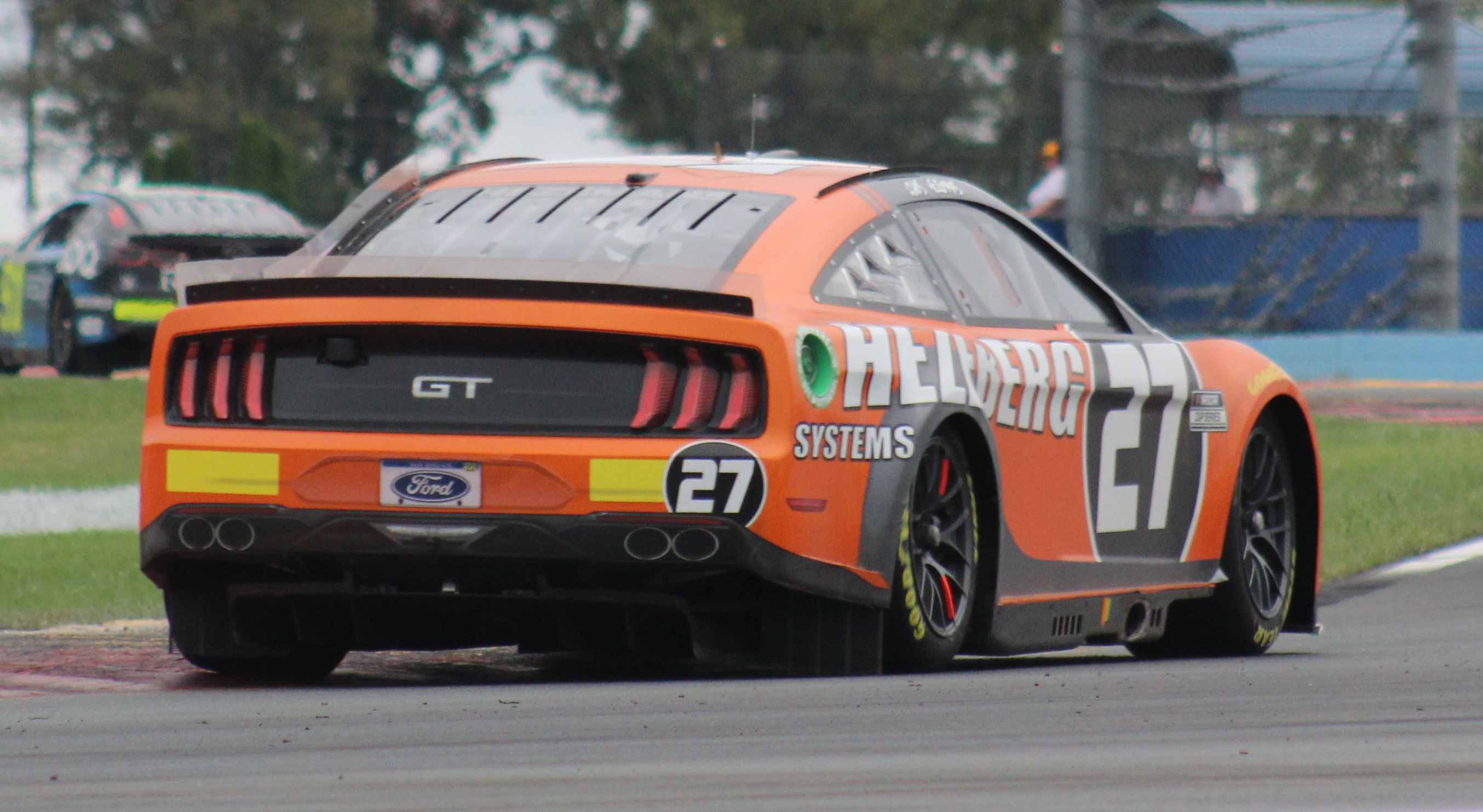
Hezemans' No. 27 car at Watkins Glen International in 2022

In 2022, Hezemans drove in five NASCAR Cup Series races for Team Hezeberg. Mechanical problems knocked him out in his first three starts, and he scored a duo of 33rd places finishes while running at the finish of his final two starts.

In 2023, Hezemans competed in the GT World Challenge Europe Endurance Cup and GT World Challenge Europe Endurance Cup Silver, competing for Comtoyou Racing.

== Racing record ==
=== Career summary ===
Season	Series	Team	Races	Wins	Poles	F/Laps	Podiums	Points	Position
2014	Renault Clio Cup Benelux	Hezemans	14	0	0	0	2	108	6th
2015	Audi Sport TT Cup	Audi Sport	12	0	0	0	1	105.5	7th
2015	Renault Clio Cup Benelux	Carsport Holland	6	1	1	0	4	92	7th
2015	SEAT León Eurocup	Target Competition	2	1	1	1	1	13	14th
2015	TCR International Series	Target Competition	4	0	0	0	1	32	12th
2016	ADAC GT Masters	Callaway Competition	6	0	0	0	0	1	55th
2016	TCR BeNeLux Touring Car Championship	Ferry Monster Autosport	6	1	1	2	2	96	14th
2016	TCR BeNeLux Touring Car Championship	Team WRT	3	0	1	0	0	96	14th
2016	TCR International Series	Baporo Motorsport	2	0	0	0	0	10	20th
2016	TCR International Series	Ferry Monster Autosport	2	0	0	0	0	10	20th
2016	TCR International Series	Target Competition	4	0	0	0	0	10	20th
2017	ADAC TCR Germany Touring Car Championship	Aust Motorsport	2	0	0	0	0	3	38th
2017	Blancpain GT Series Sprint Cup	Strakka Racing	1	0	0	0	0	0	NC
2018	Blancpain GT Series Endurance Cup	Aust Motorsport	1	0	0	0	0	0	NC
2018	Blancpain GT Series Sprint Cup	GRT Grasser Racing Team	8	0	0	0	0	12	17th
2018	Belgian Endurance Championship	Belgium Driver Academy vzw	1	0	0	0	0	54	26th
2018	NASCAR Whelen Euro Series - Elite 1	Hendriks Motorsport	12	1	1	2	6	442	4th
2019	NASCAR Whelen Euro Series - Elite 1	Hendriks Motorsport	13	4	1	2	6	551	**1st**
2019	NASCAR Xfinity Series	B. J. McLeod Motorsports	1	0	0	0	0	15	69th
2019	NASCAR PEAK Mexico Series	Escudería Hendriks Motorsport	1	0	0	0	0	22	26th
2020	NASCAR Whelen Euro Series - EuroNASCAR Pro	Hendriks Motorsport	10	2	1	1	5	390	**3rd**
2021	NASCAR Whelen Euro Series - EuroNASCAR Pro	Hendriks Motorsport-MOMO	10	4	6	5	7	412	**1st**
2021	NASCAR Xfinity Series	MBM Motorsports	2	0	0	0	0	23	62nd
2021	NASCAR Xfinity Series	DGM Racing	1	0	0	0	0	23	62nd
2021	NASCAR Xfinity Series	Reaume Brothers Racing	0	0	0	0	0	23	62nd
2021	NASCAR Xfinity Series	Hattori Racing Enterprises	1	0	0	0	0	23	62nd
2022	NASCAR Cup Series	Team Hezeberg	5	0	0	0	0	0	NC†
2022	NASCAR Xfinity Series	Reaume Brothers Racing	0	0	0	0	0	0	NC†
2022	NASCAR Xfinity Series	RSS Racing	1	0	0	0	0	0	NC†
2022	NASCAR Camping World Truck Series	Reaume Brothers Racing	1	0	0	0	0	17	59th
2023	GT World Challenge Europe Endurance Cup	Comtoyou Racing	5	0	0	0	0	0	NC
2023	GT World Challenge Europe Endurance Cup - Silver	Comtoyou Racing	5	1	0	1	4	100	**2nd**
2023	Endurance Racing Legends - GT1A	Hendriks Motorsport	2	0	2	2	2	0	NC†
2024	GT2 European Series - Pro-Am	Motorsport 98	8	0	0	0	2	87	5th

† As Hezemans was a guest driver, he was ineligible to score points.

=== Complete TCR International Series results ===
(key) (Races in bold indicate pole position) (Races in italics indicate fastest lap)

Year	Team	Car	1	2	3	4	5	6	7	8	9	10	11	12	13	14	15	16	17	18	19	20	21	22	DC	Points
2015	Target Competition	SEAT León Cup Racer	SEP; 1	SEP; 2	SHA; 1	SHA; 2	VAL; 1	VAL; 2	ALG; 1	ALG; 2	MNZ; 1	MNZ; 2	SAL; 1	SAL; 2	SOC; 1	SOC; 2	RBR; 1	RBR; 2	MRN; 1; 9	MRN; 2; 8	CHA; 1; 6	CHA; 2; 2	MAC; 1	MAC; 2	12th	32
2016	Baporo Motorsport	SEAT León TCR	BHR; 1	BHR; 2	EST; 1; 9	**EST**; **2** Ret																			20th	10
2016	Ferry Monster Autosport	SEAT León TCR					SPA; 1; 15	SPA; 2; 11	IMO; 1	IMO; 2	SAL; 1	SAL; 2	OSC; 1	OSC; 2	SOC; 1	SOC; 2	CHA; 1	CHA; 2							20th	10
2016	Target Competition	SEAT León TCR																	MRN; 1; 16†	MRN; 2 Ret	SEP; 1; 11	SEP; 2; 6	MAC; 1	MAC; 2	20th	10

^{†} Driver did not finish the race but was classified as he completed over 75% of the race distance.

=== Complete Blancpain GT Series Sprint Cup results ===
Year	Team	Car	Class	1	2	3	4	5	6	7	8	9	10	Pos.	Points
2017	Strakka Racing	McLaren 650S GT3	Pro	MIS; QR; Ret	MIS; CR; DNS	BRH; QR; DNS	BRH; CR; DNS	ZOL; QR	ZOL; CR	HUN; QR	HUN; CR	NÜR; QR	NÜR; CR	NC	0
2018	GRT Grasser Racing Team	Lamborghini Huracán GT3	Pro	ZOL; 1; 20	ZOL; 2 Ret	BRH; 1; 13	BRH; 2; 7	MIS; 1; 17	MIS; 2; 7	HUN; 1; 13	HUN; 2; 5	NÜR; 1	NÜR; 2	17th	12

=== NASCAR ===
(key) (Bold – Pole position awarded by qualifying time. Italics – Pole position earned by points standings or practice time. * – Most laps led.)

==== Cup Series ====
NASCAR Cup Series results
Year	Team	No.	Make	1	2	3	4	5	6	7	8	9	10	11	12	13	14	15	16	17	18	19	20	21	22	23	24	25	26	27	28	29	30	31	32	33	34	35	36	NCSC	Pts	Ref
2022	Team Hezeberg	27	Ford	DAY	CAL	LVS	PHO	ATL	COA; 34	RCH	MAR	BRD	TAL	DOV	DAR	KAN	CLT	GTW	SON	NSH	ROA; 37	ATL	NHA	POC	IRC; 37	MCH	RCH	GLN; 33	DAY	DAR	KAN	BRI	TEX	TAL	ROV; 33	LVS	HOM	MAR	PHO	59th	0^{1}	

==== Xfinity Series ====
NASCAR Xfinity Series results
Year	Team	No.	Make	1	2	3	4	5	6	7	8	9	10	11	12	13	14	15	16	17	18	19	20	21	22	23	24	25	26	27	28	29	30	31	32	33	NXSC	Pts	Ref
2019	B. J. McLeod Motorsports	99	Chevy	DAY	ATL	LVS	PHO	CAL	TEX	BRI	RCH	TAL	DOV	CLT	POC	MCH	IOW	CHI	DAY	KEN	NHA	IOW	GLN	MOH	BRI	ROA; 22	DAR	IND	LVS	RCH	ROV	DOV	KAN	TEX	PHO	HOM	69th	15	
2021	MBM Motorsports	13	Chevy	DAY	DRC	HOM	LVS	PHO; 31	ATL	MAR	TAL	DAR	DOV	COA	CLT	MOH	TEX	NSH																			62nd	23	
2021	DGM Racing	90	Chevy																POC; 27	ROA	ATL	NHA	GLN														62nd	23	
2021	Reaume Brothers Racing	33	Chevy																					IRC; DNQ	MCH	DAY	DAR	RCH	BRI	LVS	TAL						62nd	23	
2021	MBM Motorsports	66	Toyota																													ROV; 35	TEX				62nd	23	
2021	Hattori Racing Enterprises	61	Toyota																															KAN; 32	MAR	PHO	62nd	23	
2022	Reaume Brothers Racing	33	Toyota	DAY	CAL	LVS	PHO; DNQ																														107th	0^{1}	
2022	RSS Racing	38	Toyota					ATL; 36	COA	RCH	MAR	TAL	DOV	DAR	TEX	CLT	PIR	NSH	ROA	ATL	NHA	POC	IRC	MCH	GLN	DAY	DAR	KAN	BRI	TEX	TAL	ROV	LVS	HOM	MAR	PHO	107th	0^{1}	

==== Camping World Truck Series ====
NASCAR Camping World Truck Series results
Year	Team	No.	Make	1	2	3	4	5	6	7	8	9	10	11	12	13	14	15	16	17	18	19	20	21	22	23	NCWTC	Pts	Ref
2022	Reaume Brothers Racing	33	Toyota	DAY	LVS; 20	ATL	COA	MAR	BRD	DAR	KAN	TEX	CLT	GTW	SON	KNX	NSH	MOH	POC	IRP	RCH	KAN	BRI	TAL	HOM	PHO	59th	17	

==== Whelen Euro Series – EuroNASCAR PRO ====
(key) (Bold – Pole position. Italics – Fastest lap. * – Most laps led. ^ – Most positions gained)

NASCAR Whelen Euro Series – EuroNASCAR PRO results
Year	Team	No.	Make	1	2	3	4	5	6	7	8	9	10	11	12	13	NWES	Pts
2018	Hendriks Motorsport	50	Ford	VAL; 30	VAL; 24	FRA; 23	FRA; 3	BRH; 2	BRH; 8	TOU; 3	TOU; 4	**HOC**; 1*	HOC; 2	ZOL; 26	ZOL; 2		4th	442
2019	Hendriks Motorsport	50	Ford	VAL; 7	VAL; 3	FRA; 4	FRA; 2	BRH; 9	BRH; 12	MOS; 19*	MOS; 1*	VEN; 1	**HOC**; 1*	HOC; 1*	ZOL; 5	ZOL; 6	1st	551
2020	Hendriks Motorsport	50	Ford	**ITA**; 1	ITA; 6	BEL; 19	BEL; 5	CRO; 4	CRO; 2	ESP; 2	ESP; 3	ESP; 12	ESP; 1*				3rd	390
2021	Hendriks Motorsport-MOMO	7	Ford	**ESP**; 1*	**ESP**; 1*	GBR; 2	**GBR**; 1*	**CZE**; 8	CZE; 2	**CRO**; 1	**CRO**; 2	BEL	BEL	ITA; 10	ITA; 5*		1st	412

^{1} Ineligible for series points.

Sporting positions
Preceded by Alon Day	NASCAR Whelen Euro Series; Champion; 2019	Succeeded by Alon Day
Preceded by Alon Day	NASCAR Whelen Euro Series; Champion; 2021	Succeeded by Incumbent
