= 2022 Nalley Cars 250 =

Fifth race of the 2022 NASCAR Xfinity Series

Race details
- Race 5 of 33 of the 2022 NASCAR Xfinity Series
- Date: March 19, 2022
- Official name: 31st Annual Nalley Cars 250
- Location: Hampton, Georgia, Atlanta Motor Speedway
- Course: Permanent racing facility
- Course length: 1.54 miles (2.48 km)
- Distance: 172 laps, 264.88 mi ( km)
- Scheduled distance: 163 laps, 251.02 mi (403.98 km)
- Average speed: 101.454 mph (163.274 km/h)

Pole position
| Driver | Noah Gragson | JR Motorsports |
- Time: Set by NASCAR rulebook

Most laps led
| Driver | A. J. Allmendinger | Kaulig Racing |
- Laps: 41

Winner
| No. 54 | Ty Gibbs | Joe Gibbs Racing |

Television in the United States
- Network: Fox Sports 1
- Announcers: Adam Alexander, Brad Keselowski, Joey Logano

Radio in the United States
- Radio: Performance Racing Network

The 2022 Nalley Cars 250 was the fifth stock car race of the 2022 NASCAR Xfinity Series and the 31st iteration of the event. The race was held on Saturday, March 19, 2022, in Hampton, Georgia at Atlanta Motor Speedway, a 1.54 miles (2.48 km) permanent quad-oval racetrack. The race was run over 172 laps due to several overtime finishes. Ty Gibbs of Joe Gibbs Racing would win the race after taking the lead on the final lap. This was Gibbs' sixth career Xfinity Series win, and his second of the season. To fill out the podium, Austin Hill of Richard Childress Racing and A. J. Allmendinger of Kaulig Racing would finish 2nd and 3rd, respectably.

== Background ==
Atlanta Motor Speedway (formerly Atlanta International Raceway) is a 1.54-mile race track in Hampton, Georgia, United States, 20 miles (32 km) south of Atlanta. It has annually hosted NASCAR Cup Series stock car races since its inauguration in 1960.

The venue was bought by Speedway Motorsports in 1990. In 1994, 46 condominiums were built over the northeastern side of the track. In 1997, to standardize the track with Speedway Motorsports' other two intermediate ovals, the entire track was almost completely rebuilt. The frontstretch and backstretch were swapped, and the configuration of the track was changed from oval to quad-oval, with a new official length of 1.54-mile (2.48 km) where before it was 1.522-mile (2.449 km). The project made the track one of the fastest on the NASCAR circuit. In July 2021 NASCAR announced that the track would be reprofiled for the 2022 season to have 28 degrees of banking and would be narrowed from 55 to 40 feet which the track claims will turn racing at the track similar to restrictor plate superspeedways. Despite the reprofiling being criticized by drivers, construction began in August 2021 and wrapped up in December 2021. The track has seating capacity of 71,000 to 125,000 people depending on the tracks configuration.

=== Entry list ===
| # | Driver | Team | Make |
|---|---|---|---|
| 1 | Sam Mayer | JR Motorsports | Chevrolet |
| 02 | Brett Moffitt | Our Motorsports | Chevrolet |
| 2 | Sheldon Creed (R) | Richard Childress Racing | Chevrolet |
| 4 | Bayley Currey | JD Motorsports | Chevrolet |
| 5 | Matt Mills | B. J. McLeod Motorsports | Chevrolet |
| 6 | Ryan Vargas | JD Motorsports | Chevrolet |
| 07 | Joe Graf Jr. | SS-Green Light Racing | Ford |
| 7 | Justin Allgaier | JR Motorsports | Chevrolet |
| 08 | David Starr | SS-Green Light Racing | Ford |
| 8 | Josh Berry | JR Motorsports | Chevrolet |
| 9 | Noah Gragson | JR Motorsports | Chevrolet |
| 10 | Landon Cassill | Kaulig Racing | Chevrolet |
| 11 | Daniel Hemric | Kaulig Racing | Chevrolet |
| 13 | Chad Finchum | MBM Motorsports | Toyota |
| 16 | A. J. Allmendinger | Kaulig Racing | Chevrolet |
| 18 | Trevor Bayne | Joe Gibbs Racing | Toyota |
| 19 | Brandon Jones | Joe Gibbs Racing | Toyota |
| 21 | Austin Hill (R) | Richard Childress Racing | Chevrolet |
| 23 | Anthony Alfredo | Our Motorsports | Chevrolet |
| 26 | Jeffrey Earnhardt | Sam Hunt Racing | Toyota |
| 27 | Jeb Burton | Our Motorsports | Chevrolet |
| 28 | Kyle Sieg | RSS Racing | Ford |
| 31 | Myatt Snider | Jordan Anderson Racing | Chevrolet |
| 34 | Jesse Iwuji (R) | Jesse Iwuji Motorsports | Chevrolet |
| 35 | Shane Lee | Emerling-Gase Motorsports | Toyota |
| 36 | Alex Labbé | DGM Racing | Chevrolet |
| 38 | Loris Hezemans (i) | RSS Racing | Toyota |
| 39 | Ryan Sieg | RSS Racing | Ford |
| 44 | Sage Karam | Alpha Prime Racing | Chevrolet |
| 45 | Tommy Joe Martins | Alpha Prime Racing | Chevrolet |
| 47 | Brennan Poole | Mike Harmon Racing | Chevrolet |
| 48 | Jade Buford | Big Machine Racing | Chevrolet |
| 51 | Jeremy Clements | Jeremy Clements Racing | Chevrolet |
| 52 | Harrison Rhodes | Jimmy Means Racing | Chevrolet |
| 54 | Ty Gibbs | Joe Gibbs Racing | Toyota |
| 66 | J. J. Yeley | MBM Motorsports | Ford |
| 68 | Brandon Brown | Brandonbilt Motorsports | Chevrolet |
| 77 | Dillon Bassett | Bassett Racing | Chevrolet |
| 78 | Josh Williams | B. J. McLeod Motorsports | Chevrolet |
| 91 | Mason Massey | DGM Racing | Chevrolet |
| 92 | Kyle Weatherman | DGM Racing | Chevrolet |
| 98 | Riley Herbst | Stewart-Haas Racing | Ford |
| 99 | Stefan Parsons | B. J. McLeod Motorsports | Chevrolet |
Official entry list

== Practice ==
Friday's 50-minute practice session was cancelled due to inclement weather. Practice will replace qualifying on Saturday. Jeb Burton of Our Motorsports would set the fastest time in the session, with a time of 30.993 seconds and a speed of 178.879 mph (287.878 km/h).

| Pos. | # | Driver | Team | Make | Time | Speed |
|---|---|---|---|---|---|---|
| 1 | 27 | Jeb Burton | Our Motorsports | Chevrolet | 30.993 | 178.879 |
| 2 | 9 | Noah Gragson | JR Motorsports | Chevrolet | 31.027 | 178.683 |
| 3 | 1 | Sam Mayer | JR Motorsports | Chevrolet | 31.090 | 178.321 |
Full practice results

== Qualifying ==
Qualifying will be cancelled because of a need to add additional practice to the reconfigured circuit. Starting lineup was based on the NASCAR rulebook. Noah Gragson would get the pole for the race.

| Pos. | # | Driver | Team | Make | Time | Speed |
|---|---|---|---|---|---|---|
| 1 | 9 | Noah Gragson | JR Motorsports | Chevrolet | — | — |
| 2 | 8 | Josh Berry | JR Motorsports | Chevrolet | — | — |
| 3 | 19 | Brandon Jones | Joe Gibbs Racing | Toyota | — | — |
| 4 | 54 | Ty Gibbs | Joe Gibbs Racing | Toyota | — | — |
| 5 | 18 | Trevor Bayne | Joe Gibbs Racing | Toyota | — | — |
| 6 | 7 | Justin Allgaier | JR Motorsports | Chevrolet | — | — |
| 7 | 16 | A. J. Allmendinger | Kaulig Racing | Chevrolet | — | — |
| 8 | 11 | Daniel Hemric | Kaulig Racing | Chevrolet | — | — |
| 9 | 39 | Ryan Sieg | RSS Racing | Ford | — | — |
| 10 | 10 | Landon Cassill | Kaulig Racing | Chevrolet | — | — |
| 11 | 68 | Brandon Brown | Brandonbilt Motorsports | Chevrolet | — | — |
| 12 | 27 | Jeb Burton | Our Motorsports | Chevrolet | — | — |
| 13 | 2 | Sheldon Creed (R) | Richard Childress Racing | Chevrolet | — | — |
| 14 | 21 | Austin Hill (R) | Richard Childress Racing | Chevrolet | — | — |
| 15 | 1 | Sam Mayer | JR Motorsports | Chevrolet | — | — |
| 16 | 02 | Brett Moffitt | Our Motorsports | Chevrolet | — | — |
| 17 | 36 | Alex Labbé | DGM Racing | Chevrolet | — | — |
| 18 | 51 | Jeremy Clements | Jeremy Clements Racing | Chevrolet | — | — |
| 19 | 26 | Jeffrey Earnhardt | Sam Hunt Racing | Toyota | — | — |
| 20 | 4 | Bayley Currey | JD Motorsports | Chevrolet | — | — |
| 21 | 66 | J. J. Yeley | MBM Motorsports | Ford | — | — |
| 22 | 31 | Myatt Snider | Jordan Anderson Racing | Chevrolet | — | — |
| 23 | 07 | Joe Graf Jr. | SS-Green Light Racing | Ford | — | — |
| 24 | 98 | Riley Herbst | Stewart-Haas Racing | Ford | — | — |
| 25 | 99 | Stefan Parsons | B. J. McLeod Motorsports | Chevrolet | — | — |
| 26 | 91 | Mason Massey | DGM Racing | Chevrolet | — | — |
| 27 | 23 | Anthony Alfredo | Our Motorsports | Chevrolet | — | — |
| 28 | 92 | Kyle Weatherman | DGM Racing | Chevrolet | — | — |
| 29 | 44 | Sage Karam | Alpha Prime Racing | Chevrolet | — | — |
| 30 | 48 | Jade Buford | Big Machine Racing | Chevrolet | — | — |
| 31 | 28 | Kyle Sieg | RSS Racing | Ford | — | — |
| 32 | 6 | Ryan Vargas | JD Motorsports | Chevrolet | — | — |
| 33 | 5 | Matt Mills | B. J. McLeod Motorsports | Chevrolet | — | — |
Qualified by owner's points
| 34 | 38 | Loris Hezemans (i) | RSS Racing | Toyota | — | — |
| 35 | 35 | Shane Lee | Emerling-Gase Motorsports | Toyota | — | — |
| 36 | 78 | Josh Williams | B. J. McLeod Motorsports | Chevrolet | — | — |
| 37 | 45 | Tommy Joe Martins | Alpha Prime Racing | Chevrolet | — | — |
| 38 | 34 | Jesse Iwuji (R) | Jesse Iwuji Motorsports | Chevrolet | — | — |
Failed to qualify
| 39 | 08 | David Starr | SS-Green Light Racing | Ford | — | — |
| 40 | 47 | Brennan Poole | Mike Harmon Racing | Chevrolet | — | — |
| 41 | 13 | Chad Finchum | MBM Motorsports | Toyota | — | — |
| 42 | 77 | Dillon Bassett | Bassett Racing | Chevrolet | — | — |
| 43 | 52 | Harrison Rhodes | Jimmy Means Racing | Chevrolet | — | — |
Official starting lineup

== Race results ==
Stage 1 Laps: 40

| Pos. | # | Driver | Team | Make | Pts |
|---|---|---|---|---|---|
| 1 | 8 | Josh Berry | JR Motorsports | Chevrolet | 10 |
| 2 | 9 | Noah Gragson | JR Motorsports | Chevrolet | 9 |
| 3 | 7 | Justin Allgaier | JR Motorsports | Chevrolet | 8 |
| 4 | 1 | Sam Mayer | JR Motorsports | Chevrolet | 7 |
| 5 | 18 | Trevor Bayne | Joe Gibbs Racing | Toyota | 6 |
| 6 | 21 | Austin Hill (R) | Richard Childress Racing | Chevrolet | 5 |
| 7 | 27 | Jeb Burton | Our Motorsports | Chevrolet | 4 |
| 8 | 68 | Brandon Brown | Brandonbilt Motorsports | Chevrolet | 3 |
| 9 | 19 | Brandon Jones | Joe Gibbs Racing | Toyota | 2 |
| 10 | 02 | Brett Moffitt | Our Motorsports | Chevrolet | 1 |

Stage 2 Laps: 40

| Pos. | # | Driver | Team | Make | Pts |
|---|---|---|---|---|---|
| 1 | 16 | A. J. Allmendinger | Kaulig Racing | Chevrolet | 10 |
| 2 | 11 | Daniel Hemric | Kaulig Racing | Chevrolet | 9 |
| 3 | 48 | Jade Buford | Big Machine Racing | Chevrolet | 8 |
| 4 | 45 | Tommy Joe Martins | Alpha Prime Racing | Chevrolet | 7 |
| 5 | 44 | Sage Karam | Alpha Prime Racing | Chevrolet | 6 |
| 6 | 2 | Sheldon Creed (R) | Richard Childress Racing | Chevrolet | 5 |
| 7 | 68 | Brandon Brown | Brandonbilt Motorsports | Chevrolet | 4 |
| 8 | 21 | Austin Hill (R) | Richard Childress Racing | Chevrolet | 3 |
| 9 | 27 | Jeb Burton | Our Motorsports | Chevrolet | 2 |
| 10 | 10 | Landon Cassill | Kaulig Racing | Chevrolet | 1 |

Stage 3 Laps: 83

| Fin. | St | # | Driver | Team | Make | Laps | Led | Status | Points |
|---|---|---|---|---|---|---|---|---|---|
| 1 | 4 | 54 | Ty Gibbs | Joe Gibbs Racing | Toyota | 172 | 1 | Running | 40 |
| 2 | 14 | 21 | Austin Hill (R) | Richard Childress Racing | Chevrolet | 172 | 27 | Running | 43 |
| 3 | 7 | 16 | A. J. Allmendinger | Kaulig Racing | Chevrolet | 172 | 41 | Running | 44 |
| 4 | 24 | 98 | Riley Herbst | Stewart-Haas Racing | Ford | 172 | 0 | Running | 33 |
| 5 | 10 | 10 | Landon Cassill | Kaulig Racing | Chevrolet | 172 | 0 | Running | 33 |
| 6 | 26 | 91 | Mason Massey | DGM Racing | Chevrolet | 172 | 0 | Running | 31 |
| 7 | 3 | 19 | Brandon Jones | Joe Gibbs Racing | Toyota | 172 | 1 | Running | 32 |
| 8 | 28 | 92 | Kyle Weatherman | DGM Racing | Chevrolet | 172 | 0 | Running | 29 |
| 9 | 13 | 2 | Sheldon Creed (R) | Richard Childress Racing | Chevrolet | 172 | 15 | Running | 33 |
| 10 | 9 | 39 | Ryan Sieg | RSS Racing | Ford | 172 | 6 | Running | 27 |
| 11 | 21 | 66 | J. J. Yeley | MBM Motorsports | Ford | 172 | 0 | Running | 26 |
| 12 | 32 | 6 | Ryan Vargas | JD Motorsports | Chevrolet | 172 | 0 | Running | 25 |
| 13 | 19 | 26 | Jeffrey Earnhardt | Sam Hunt Racing | Toyota | 172 | 0 | Running | 24 |
| 14 | 16 | 02 | Brett Moffitt | Our Motorsports | Chevrolet | 172 | 0 | Running | 24 |
| 15 | 12 | 27 | Jeb Burton | Our Motorsports | Chevrolet | 172 | 0 | Running | 28 |
| 16 | 27 | 23 | Anthony Alfredo | Our Motorsports | Chevrolet | 172 | 0 | Running | 21 |
| 17 | 35 | 35 | Shane Lee | Emerling-Gase Motorsports | Toyota | 172 | 0 | Running | 20 |
| 18 | 11 | 68 | Brandon Brown | Brandonbilt Motorsports | Chevrolet | 172 | 0 | Running | 26 |
| 19 | 17 | 36 | Alex Labbé | DGM Racing | Chevrolet | 172 | 0 | Running | 18 |
| 20 | 37 | 45 | Tommy Joe Martins | Alpha Prime Racing | Chevrolet | 172 | 0 | Running | 24 |
| 21 | 15 | 1 | Sam Mayer | JR Motorsports | Chevrolet | 172 | 0 | Running | 23 |
| 22 | 36 | 78 | Josh Williams | B. J. McLeod Motorsports | Chevrolet | 172 | 0 | Running | 15 |
| 23 | 23 | 07 | Joe Graf Jr. | SS-Green Light Racing | Ford | 172 | 0 | Running | 14 |
| 24 | 31 | 28 | Kyle Sieg | RSS Racing | Ford | 172 | 0 | Running | 13 |
| 25 | 25 | 99 | Stefan Parsons | B. J. McLeod Motorsports | Chevrolet | 172 | 0 | Running | 12 |
| 26 | 1 | 9 | Noah Gragson | JR Motorsports | Chevrolet | 172 | 38 | Running | 20 |
| 27 | 38 | 34 | Jesse Iwuji (R) | Jesse Iwuji Motorsports | Chevrolet | 172 | 0 | Running | 10 |
| 28 | 5 | 18 | Trevor Bayne | Joe Gibbs Racing | Toyota | 172 | 38 | Running | 15 |
| 29 | 20 | 4 | Bayley Currey | JD Motorsports | Chevrolet | 172 | 0 | Running | 8 |
| 30 | 22 | 31 | Myatt Snider | Jordan Anderson Racing | Chevrolet | 171 | 2 | Running | 7 |
| 31 | 33 | 5 | Matt Mills | B. J. McLeod Motorsports | Chevrolet | 165 | 0 | Accident | 6 |
| 32 | 29 | 44 | Sage Karam | Alpha Prime Racing | Chevrolet | 154 | 0 | Accident | 11 |
| 33 | 2 | 8 | Josh Berry | JR Motorsports | Chevrolet | 153 | 3 | Accident | 14 |
| 34 | 6 | 7 | Justin Allgaier | JR Motorsports | Chevrolet | 152 | 0 | Accident | 11 |
| 35 | 8 | 11 | Daniel Hemric | Kaulig Racing | Chevrolet | 113 | 0 | Accident | 11 |
| 36 | 34 | 38 | Loris Hezemans (i) | RSS Racing | Toyota | 112 | 0 | Accident | 0 |
| 37 | 18 | 51 | Jeremy Clements | Jeremy Clements Racing | Chevrolet | 106 | 0 | Accident | 1 |
| 38 | 30 | 48 | Jade Buford | Big Machine Racing | Chevrolet | 105 | 0 | Accident | 9 |
Official race results

== Standings after the race ==
Drivers' Championship standings

| Pos | Driver | Points |
|---|---|---|
| 1 | Noah Gragson | 223 |
| 2 | Ty Gibbs | 204 (-19) |
| 3 | A. J. Allmendinger | 204 (–19) |
| 4 | Justin Allgaier | 172 (–51) |
| 5 | Josh Berry | 164 (–59) |
| 6 | Brandon Jones | 153 (–70) |
| 7 | Daniel Hemric | 146 (–77) |
| 8 | Austin Hill | 137 (–86) |
| 9 | Riley Herbst | 128 (–95) |
| 10 | Ryan Sieg | 125 (–98) |
| 11 | Landon Cassill | 122 (–101) |
| 12 | Sheldon Creed | 122 (–101) |
Official driver's standings

- Note: Only the first 12 positions are included for the driver standings.

| Previous race: 2022 United Rentals 200 | NASCAR Xfinity Series; 2022 season | Next race: 2022 Pit Boss 250 |
