= Miguel Gomes (racing driver) =

Portuguese racing driver

- Born: 29 February 1980 (age 46); Lisbon, Portugal

ARCA Menards Series career
- 2 races run over 2 years
- Best finish: 102nd (2025)
- First race: 2023 2023 BRANDT 200 (Daytona)
- Last race: 2025 Tide 150 (Kansas)
Wins	Top tens	Poles
0	0	0
- Statistics up to date as of May 10, 2025.

Miguel Gomes (born February 29, 1980) is a Portuguese professional stock car racing driver who last competed part-time in the ARCA Menards Series, driving the No. 69 Ford for Kimmel Racing.

== Racing career ==
In 2021, it was announced that Gomes would drive the No. 46 Chevrolet for Marko Stipp Motorsport for the full NASCAR Whelen Euro Series in the EuroNASCAR 2 division, whilst also being a part of both the Rookie Trophy and Legend Trophy. He would go on to finish fifteenth in the final standings and third in the Rookie Trophy with a best finish of ninth at the second race at Autodrom Most. On January 6, 2022, he would be retained by Stipp for the 2022 season following a contract extension. He would finish 16th in the final standings with three top-ten finishes including a best result of ninth at the season opening race at Circuit Ricardo Tormo.

Gomes would remain with the team for the 2023 season, this time moving up to the EuroNASCAR Pro division. It was also during this year that he would participate in pre-season testing for the ARCA Menards Series at Daytona International Speedway driving for Fast Track Racing in the No. 01 Ford. After not turning a lap in the Friday session, he would place 30th in the Saturday session. One month after the test, it was announced that Gomes would compete in the season-opening race at the track driving the No. 02 Chevrolet for Young's Motorsports. After starting 38th, he would go on to finish 31st after suffering a cut tire late in the race.

In 2025, it was revealed that Gomes would return to the ARCA Menards Series, this time driving the No. 69 Ford for Kimmel Racing at Kansas Speedway.

== Motorsports career results ==
=== NASCAR ===
(key) (Bold – Pole position awarded by qualifying time. Italics – Pole position earned by points standings or practice time. * – Most laps led.)

==== Whelen Euro Series – EuroNASCAR PRO ====
NASCAR Whelen Euro Series – EuroNASCAR PRO results
Year	Team	No.	Make	1	2	3	4	5	6	7	8	9	10	11	12	NWES	Pts
2023	Marko Stipp Motorsport	48	Chevy	ESP; 20	ESP; 23	GBR	GBR	ITA	ITA	CZE	CZE	GER	GER	BEL	BEL	38th	31

==== Whelen Euro Series – EuroNASCAR 2 ====
(key) (Bold – Pole position. Italics – Fastest lap. * – Most laps led. ^ – Most positions gained)

NASCAR Whelen Euro Series – EuroNASCAR 2 results
Year	Team	No.	Make	1	2	3	4	5	6	7	8	9	10	11	12	NWES	Pts
2021	Marko Stipp Motorsport	46	Chevy	ESP; 14	ESP; 14	GBR; 16	GBR; 18	CZE; 13	CZE; 9	CRO; 15	CRO; 18	BEL; 15	BEL; 23	ITA; 11	ITA; 14	15th	289
2022	Marko Stipp Motorsport	46	Chevy	ESP; 9	ESP; 17	GBR; 10	GBR; 13	ITA; 28	ITA; 15	CZE; 12	CZE; 10	BEL; 21	BEL; 12	CRO; 24	CRO; 25	16th	252

=== ARCA Menards Series ===
(key) (Bold – Pole position awarded by qualifying time. Italics – Pole position earned by points standings or practice time. * – Most laps led. ** – All laps led.)

ARCA Menards Series results
Year	Team	No.	Make	1	2	3	4	5	6	7	8	9	10	11	12	13	14	15	16	17	18	19	20	AMSC	Pts	Ref
2023	Young's Motorsports	02	Chevy	DAY; 31	PHO	TAL	KAN	CLT	BLN	ELK	MOH	IOW	POC	MCH	IRP	GLN	ISF	MLW	DSF	KAN	BRI	SLM	TOL	116th	13	
2025	Kimmel Racing	69	Ford	DAY	PHO	TAL	KAN; 11	CLT	MCH	BLN	ELK	LRP	DOV	IRP	IOW	GLN	ISF	MAD	DSF	BRI	SLM	KAN	TOL	102nd	33	
