= 2022 WISE Power 400 =

Second race of the 2022 NASCAR Cup Series

Race details
- Race 2 of 36 in the 2022 NASCAR Cup Series
- The 2022 WISE Power 400 program cover.
- Date: February 27, 2022
- Location: Auto Club Speedway in Fontana, California
- Course: Permanent racing facility
- Course length: 3.22 km (2 miles)
- Distance: 200 laps, 400 mi (640 km)
- Average speed: 114.222 miles per hour (183.822 km/h)

Pole position
Driver	Austin Cindric	Team Penske
- Time: 41.226

Most laps led
Driver	Tyler Reddick	Richard Childress Racing
- Laps: 90

Winner
No. 5	Kyle Larson	Hendrick Motorsports

Television in the United States
- Network: Fox
- Announcers: Mike Joy, Clint Bowyer, and Matt Kenseth
- Nielsen ratings: 2.61, 4.570 Million Viewers

Radio in the United States
- Radio: MRN
- Booth announcers: Alex Hayden, Jeff Striegle, and Todd Gordon
- Turn announcers: Dan Hubbard (1 & 2) and Kurt Becker (3 & 4)

The 2022 WISE Power 400 was the second stock car race of the 2022 NASCAR Cup Series and the 25th running of the event. The race was held on Sunday, in Fontana, California, at Auto Club Speedway, a 2 miles (3.2 km) permanent D-shaped oval racetrack. The race took the scheduled 200 laps to complete. At race's end, Kyle Larson, driving for Hendrick Motorsports, would win a drama-filled race after a controversial block on teammate Chase Elliott within the closing laps of the race had put Elliott in the wall. Larson would defend the field on the final restart to win his 17th career NASCAR Cup Series race and his first of the season. To fill out the top 3, Austin Dillon of Richard Childress Racing and Erik Jones of Petty GMS Motorsports would finish second and third, respectively.

== Report ==
=== Background ===
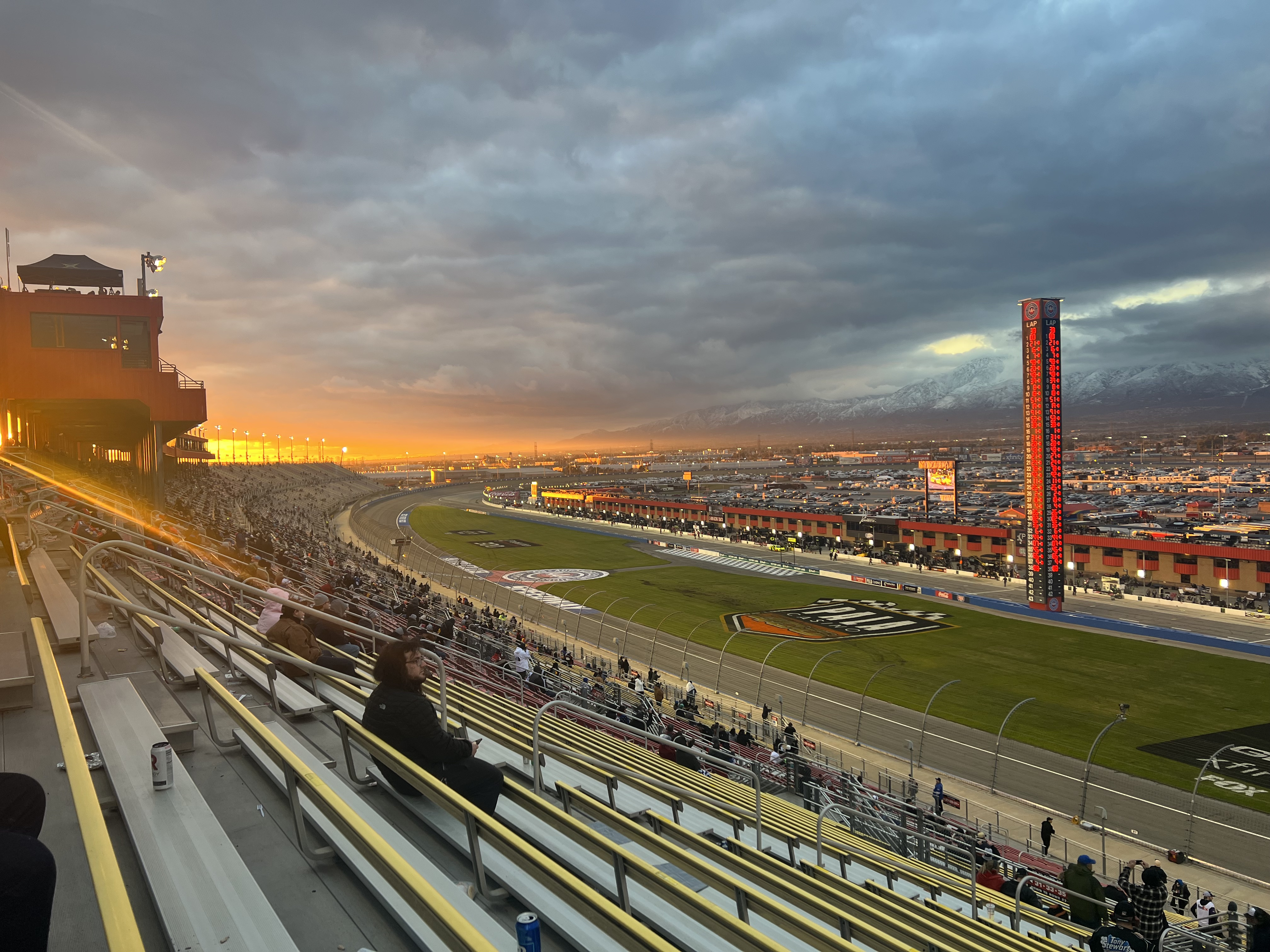
Auto Club Speedway, the track where the race was held.

Auto Club Speedway (previously California Speedway) was a two-mile (3.2 km), low-banked, D-shaped oval superspeedway in Fontana, California which hosted NASCAR racing annually from 1997 to 2023. It was also used for open wheel racing events. The racetrack was located near the former locations of Ontario Motor Speedway and Riverside International Raceway. The track was owned and operated by International Speedway Corporation and was the only track owned by ISC to have its naming rights sold. The speedway was served by the nearby Interstate 10 and Interstate 15 freeways as well as a Metrolink station located behind the backstretch.

==== Entry list ====
- (R) denotes rookie driver.
- (i) denotes driver who is ineligible for series driver points.

No.	Driver	Team	Manufacturer
1	Ross Chastain	Trackhouse Racing Team	Chevrolet
2	Austin Cindric (R)	Team Penske	Ford
3	Austin Dillon	Richard Childress Racing	Chevrolet
4	Kevin Harvick	Stewart-Haas Racing	Ford
5	Kyle Larson	Hendrick Motorsports	Chevrolet
6	Brad Keselowski	RFK Racing	Ford
7	Corey LaJoie	Spire Motorsports	Chevrolet
8	Tyler Reddick	Richard Childress Racing	Chevrolet
9	Chase Elliott	Hendrick Motorsports	Chevrolet
10	Aric Almirola	Stewart-Haas Racing	Ford
11	Denny Hamlin	Joe Gibbs Racing	Toyota
12	Ryan Blaney	Team Penske	Ford
14	Chase Briscoe	Stewart-Haas Racing	Ford
15	Garrett Smithley	Rick Ware Racing	Ford
16	Daniel Hemric (i)	Kaulig Racing	Chevrolet
17	Chris Buescher	RFK Racing	Ford
18	Kyle Busch	Joe Gibbs Racing	Toyota
19	Martin Truex Jr.	Joe Gibbs Racing	Toyota
20	Christopher Bell	Joe Gibbs Racing	Toyota
21	Harrison Burton (R)	Wood Brothers Racing	Ford
22	Joey Logano	Team Penske	Ford
23	Bubba Wallace	23XI Racing	Toyota
24	William Byron	Hendrick Motorsports	Chevrolet
31	Justin Haley	Kaulig Racing	Chevrolet
34	Michael McDowell	Front Row Motorsports	Ford
38	Todd Gilliland (R)	Front Row Motorsports	Ford
41	Cole Custer	Stewart-Haas Racing	Ford
42	Ty Dillon	Petty GMS Motorsports	Chevrolet
43	Erik Jones	Petty GMS Motorsports	Chevrolet
45	Kurt Busch	23XI Racing	Toyota
47	Ricky Stenhouse Jr.	JTG Daugherty Racing	Chevrolet
48	Alex Bowman	Hendrick Motorsports	Chevrolet
51	Cody Ware	Rick Ware Racing	Ford
77	Josh Bilicki (i)	Spire Motorsports	Chevrolet
78	B. J. McLeod	Live Fast Motorsports	Ford
99	Daniel Suárez	Trackhouse Racing Team	Chevrolet
Official entry list

== Practice ==
Denny Hamlin was the fastest in the practice session with a time of 41.519 seconds and a speed of 173.415 mph (279.084 km/h).

=== Practice results ===
Pos	No.	Driver	Team	Manufacturer	Time	Speed
1	11	Denny Hamlin	Joe Gibbs Racing	Toyota	41.519	173.415
2	18	Kyle Busch	Joe Gibbs Racing	Toyota	41.580	173.160
3	8	Tyler Reddick	Richard Childress Racing	Chevrolet	41.746	172.472
Official practice results

== Qualifying ==
Austin Cindric scored the pole for the race with a time of 41.226 and a speed of 174.647 mph (281.067 km/h).

=== Qualifying results ===
Pos	No.	Driver	Team	Manufacturer	R1	R2
1	2	Austin Cindric (R)	Team Penske	Ford	41.310	41.226
2	43	Erik Jones	Petty GMS Motorsports	Chevrolet	41.316	41.342
3	18	Kyle Busch	Joe Gibbs Racing	Toyota	41.628	41.437
4	11	Denny Hamlin	Joe Gibbs Racing	Toyota	41.566	41.529
5	16	Daniel Hemric (i)	Kaulig Racing	Chevrolet	41.405	41.585
6	12	Ryan Blaney	Team Penske	Ford	41.271	41.588
7	22	Joey Logano	Team Penske	Ford	41.358	42.197
8	9	Chase Elliott	Hendrick Motorsports	Chevrolet	41.177	0.000
9	6	Brad Keselowski	RFK Racing	Ford	41.403	0.000
10	24	William Byron	Hendrick Motorsports	Chevrolet	41.478	0.000
11	8	Tyler Reddick	Richard Childress Racing	Chevrolet	41.516	—
12	19	Martin Truex Jr.	Joe Gibbs Racing	Toyota	41.517	—
13	5	Kyle Larson	Hendrick Motorsports	Chevrolet	41.594	—
14	48	Alex Bowman	Hendrick Motorsports	Chevrolet	41.634	—
15	99	Daniel Suárez	Trackhouse Racing Team	Chevrolet	41.636	—
16	3	Austin Dillon	Richard Childress Racing	Chevrolet	41.678	—
17	47	Ricky Stenhouse Jr.	JTG Daugherty Racing	Chevrolet	41.688	—
18	42	Ty Dillon	Petty GMS Motorsports	Chevrolet	41.777	—
19	20	Christopher Bell	Joe Gibbs Racing	Toyota	41.888	—
20	17	Chris Buescher	RFK Racing	Ford	41.888	—
21	41	Cole Custer	Stewart-Haas Racing	Ford	41.940	—
22	21	Harrison Burton (R)	Wood Brothers Racing	Ford	41.989	—
23	34	Michael McDowell	Front Row Motorsports	Ford	42.056	—
24	14	Chase Briscoe	Stewart-Haas Racing	Ford	42.140	—
25	7	Corey LaJoie	Spire Motorsports	Chevrolet	42.188	—
26	38	Todd Gilliland (R)	Front Row Motorsports	Ford	42.505	—
27	51	Cody Ware	Rick Ware Racing	Ford	42.634	—
28	77	Josh Bilicki (i)	Spire Motorsports	Chevrolet	42.957	—
29	15	Garrett Smithley	Rick Ware Racing	Ford	43.953	—
30	78	B. J. McLeod	Live Fast Motorsports	Ford	44.103	—
31	10	Aric Almirola	Stewart-Haas Racing	Ford	0.000	—
32	4	Kevin Harvick	Stewart-Haas Racing	Ford	0.000	—
33	1	Ross Chastain	Trackhouse Racing Team	Chevrolet	0.000	—
34	23	Bubba Wallace	23XI Racing	Toyota	0.000	—
35	31	Justin Haley	Kaulig Racing	Chevrolet	0.000	—
36	45	Kurt Busch	23XI Racing	Toyota	0.000	—
Official qualifying results

== Race ==
=== Stage Results ===
Stage One Laps: 65

Pos	No	Driver	Team	Manufacturer	Points
1	8	Tyler Reddick	Richard Childress Racing	Chevrolet	10
2	43	Erik Jones	Petty GMS Motorsports	Chevrolet	9
3	24	William Byron	Hendrick Motorsports	Chevrolet	8
4	14	Chase Briscoe	Stewart-Haas Racing	Ford	7
5	5	Kyle Larson	Hendrick Motorsports	Chevrolet	6
6	48	Alex Bowman	Hendrick Motorsports	Chevrolet	5
7	22	Joey Logano	Team Penske	Ford	4
8	12	Ryan Blaney	Team Penske	Ford	3
9	2	Austin Cindric (R)	Team Penske	Ford	2
10	47	Ricky Stenhouse Jr.	JTG Daugherty Racing	Chevrolet	1
Official stage one results

Stage Two Laps: 65

Pos	No	Driver	Team	Manufacturer	Points
1	8	Tyler Reddick	Richard Childress Racing	Chevrolet	10
2	43	Erik Jones	Petty GMS Motorsports	Chevrolet	9
3	22	Joey Logano	Team Penske	Ford	8
4	12	Ryan Blaney	Team Penske	Ford	7
5	5	Kyle Larson	Hendrick Motorsports	Chevrolet	6
6	41	Cole Custer	Stewart-Haas Racing	Ford	5
7	2	Austin Cindric (R)	Team Penske	Ford	4
8	10	Aric Almirola	Stewart-Haas Racing	Ford	3
9	24	William Byron	Hendrick Motorsports	Chevrolet	2
10	11	Denny Hamlin	Joe Gibbs Racing	Toyota	1
Official stage two results

=== Final Stage Results ===
Stage Three Laps: 70

Pos	Grid	No	Driver	Team	Manufacturer	Laps	Points
1	13	5	Kyle Larson	Hendrick Motorsports	Chevrolet	200	52
2	16	3	Austin Dillon	Richard Childress Racing	Chevrolet	200	35
3	2	43	Erik Jones	Petty GMS Motorsports	Chevrolet	200	52
4	15	99	Daniel Suárez	Trackhouse Racing Team	Chevrolet	200	33
5	7	22	Joey Logano	Team Penske	Ford	200	44
6	31	10	Aric Almirola	Stewart-Haas Racing	Ford	200	34
7	32	4	Kevin Harvick	Stewart-Haas Racing	Ford	200	30
8	36	45	Kurt Busch	23XI Racing	Toyota	200	29
9	5	16	Daniel Hemric (i)	Kaulig Racing	Chevrolet	200	0
10	17	47	Ricky Stenhouse Jr.	JTG Daugherty Racing	Chevrolet	200	28
11	21	41	Cole Custer	Stewart-Haas Racing	Ford	200	31
12	1	2	Austin Cindric (R)	Team Penske	Ford	200	31
13	12	19	Martin Truex Jr.	Joe Gibbs Racing	Toyota	200	24
14	3	18	Kyle Busch	Joe Gibbs Racing	Toyota	200	23
15	4	11	Denny Hamlin	Joe Gibbs Racing	Toyota	200	23
16	24	14	Chase Briscoe	Stewart-Haas Racing	Ford	200	28
17	18	42	Ty Dillon	Petty GMS Motorsports	Chevrolet	200	20
18	6	12	Ryan Blaney	Team Penske	Ford	200	29
19	34	23	Bubba Wallace	23XI Racing	Toyota	200	18
20	26	38	Todd Gilliland (R)	Front Row Motorsports	Ford	200	17
21	29	15	Garrett Smithley	Rick Ware Racing	Ford	200	16
22	30	78	B. J. McLeod	Live Fast Motorsports	Ford	200	15
23	35	31	Justin Haley	Kaulig Racing	Chevrolet	200	14
24	11	8	Tyler Reddick	Richard Childress Racing	Chevrolet	199	33
25	14	48	Alex Bowman	Hendrick Motorsports	Chevrolet	199	17
26	8	9	Chase Elliott	Hendrick Motorsports	Chevrolet	198	11
27	9	6	Brad Keselowski	RFK Racing	Ford	198	10
28	25	7	Corey LaJoie	Spire Motorsports	Chevrolet	198	9
29	33	1	Ross Chastain	Trackhouse Racing Team	Chevrolet	198	8
30	28	77	Josh Bilicki (i)	Spire Motorsports	Chevrolet	198	7
31	23	34	Michael McDowell	Front Row Motorsports	Ford	193	6
32	27	51	Cody Ware	Rick Ware Racing	Ford	187	5
33	22	21	Harrison Burton (R)	Wood Brothers Racing	Ford	157	4
34	10	24	William Byron	Hendrick Motorsports	Chevrolet	151	13
35	20	17	Chris Buescher	RFK Racing	Ford	111	2
36	19	20	Christopher Bell	Joe Gibbs Racing	Toyota	94	1
Official race results

=== Race statistics ===
- Lead changes: 32 among 9 different drivers
- Cautions/Laps: 12 for 59 laps
- Red flags: 0
- Time of race: 3 hours, 3 minutes and 7 seconds
- Average speed: 114.222 miles per hour (183.822 km/h)

== Media ==
=== Television ===
The race was the 21st race Fox Sports covered at the Auto Club Speedway. Mike Joy, Clint Bowyer and three-time Auto Club winner Matt Kenseth called the race in the booth for Fox. Jamie Little and Regan Smith handled the pit road duties, and Larry McReynolds provided insight from the Fox Sports studio in Charlotte.

Fox
Booth announcers	Pit reporters	In-race analyst
Lap-by-lap: Mike Joy; Color-commentator: Clint Bowyer; Color-commentator: Matt Kenseth	Jamie Little; Regan Smith	Larry McReynolds

=== Radio ===
MRN had the radio call for the race, which was also simulcast on Sirius XM NASCAR Radio. Alex Hayden, Jeff Striegle, and 2018 NASCAR Cup Championship crew chief Todd Gordon called the race from the booth when the field raced their way down the front stretch. Dan Hubbard called the race from a billboard outside turn 2 when the field raced their way through turns 1 and 2, and Kurt Becker called the race from a billboard outside turn 3 when the field raced their way through turns 3 and 4. Steve Post and Jason Toy had the pit road duties for MRN.

MRN
Booth announcers	Turn announcers	Pit reporters
Lead announcer: Alex Hayden; Announcer: Jeff Striegle; Announcer: Todd Gordon	Turns 1 & 2: Dan Hubbard; Turns 3 & 4: Kurt Becker	Steve Post; Jason Toy

== Standings after the race ==
Drivers' Championship standings

	Pos	Driver	Points
	1	Austin Cindric	85
9	2	Joey Logano	77 (–8)
	3	Martin Truex Jr.	73 (–12)
2	4	Ryan Blaney	70 (–15)
	5	Chase Briscoe	69 (–16)
16	6	Erik Jones	68 (–17)
5	7	Aric Almirola	66 (–19)
18	8	Kyle Larson	65 (–20)
5	9	Bubba Wallace	65 (–20)
8	10	Brad Keselowski	64 (–21)
3	11	Kyle Busch	61 (–24)
4	12	Kurt Busch	53 (–32)
2	13	Ricky Stenhouse Jr.	53 (–32)
7	14	Austin Dillon	52 (–33)
4	15	Daniel Suárez	52 (–33)
4	16	Cole Custer	48 (–37)
Official driver's standings

Manufacturers' Championship standings

	Pos	Manufacturer	Points
	1	Ford	72
1	2	Chevrolet	67 (–5)
1	3	Toyota	64 (–8)

- Note: Only the first 16 positions are included for the driver standings.

Previous race: 2022 Daytona 500	NASCAR Cup Series; 2022 season	Next race: 2022 Pennzoil 400
