= Will Rodgers =

American racing driver (born 1994)

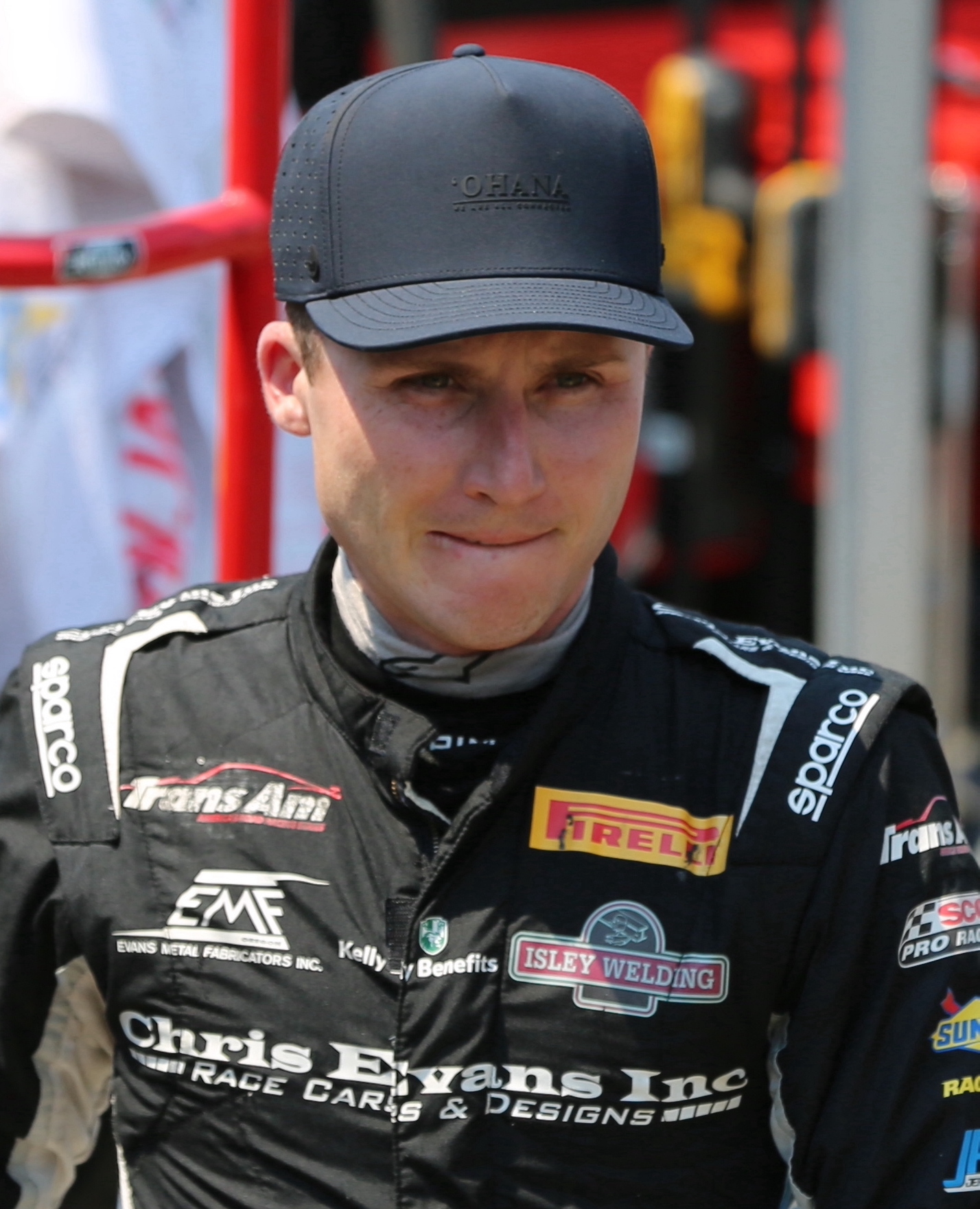
- Rodgers at Sonoma Raceway in 2025
- Born: William Palmer Rodgers; October 8, 1994 (age 32); Maui, Hawaii, U.S.
- Achievements: 2023 Trans-Am West Coast Series Champion

NASCAR O'Reilly Auto Parts Series career
- 15 races run over 5 years
- Car no., team: No. 48 (Big Machine Racing)
- 2026 position: 36th
- Best finish: 36th (2026)
- First race: 2019 U.S. Cellular 250 (Iowa)
- Last race: 2026 O'Reilly Auto Parts 300 (Homestead)
Wins	Top tens	Poles
0	0	0

NASCAR FedEx Freight Truck Series career
- 6 races run over 4 years
- 2025 position: 97th
- Best finish: 62nd (2023)
- First race: 2021 United Rentals 176 at The Glen (Watkins Glen)
- Last race: 2025 Ecosave 250 (Charlotte Roval)
Wins	Top tens	Poles
0	0	0

ARCA Menards Series career
- 7 races run over 2 years
- Best finish: 22nd (2018)
- First race: 2018 Lucas Oil 200 (Daytona)
- Last race: 2020 General Tire 100 (Daytona RC)
Wins	Top tens	Poles
0	5	0

ARCA Menards Series East career
- 5 races run over 2 years
- Best finish: 22nd (2017)
- First race: 2017 Finger Lakes Wine Country 100 (Watkins Glen)
- Last race: 2018 Monaco Gateway Classic (Gateway)
- First win: 2017 Finger Lakes Wine Country 100 (Watkins Glen)
- Last win: 2018 JustDrive.com 125 (Millville)
Wins	Top tens	Poles
3	4	0

ARCA Menards Series West career
- 31 races run over 6 years
- Best finish: 5th (2017)
- First race: 2016 Chevy's Fresh Mex 200 (Sonoma)
- Last race: 2025 General Tire 200 (Sonoma)
- First win: 2018 Carneros 200 (Sonoma)
Wins	Top tens	Poles
1	22	2
- Statistics up to date as of November 7, 2026.

William Palmer Rodgers (born October 8, 1994) is an American professional stock car racing driver. He competes full-time in the NASCAR O'Reilly Auto Parts Series, driving the No. 48 Chevrolet Camaro SS for Big Machine Racing. He has also been a part-time driver in the NASCAR Craftsman Truck Series, ARCA Menards Series, NASCAR K&N Pro Series East (now the ARCA Menards Series East), ARCA Menards Series West and the Pirelli World Challenge.

== Racing career ==
=== 2016: West Series debut ===
After racing in the Pirelli World Challenge, Rodgers began racing in the NASCAR K&N Pro Series West in 2016, driving for team owner Dave Hanson. He made his debut at Sonoma Raceway, finishing in seventeenth. He ended the season with four top-ten finishes.

=== 2017: Breakthrough with Kevin Harvick ===
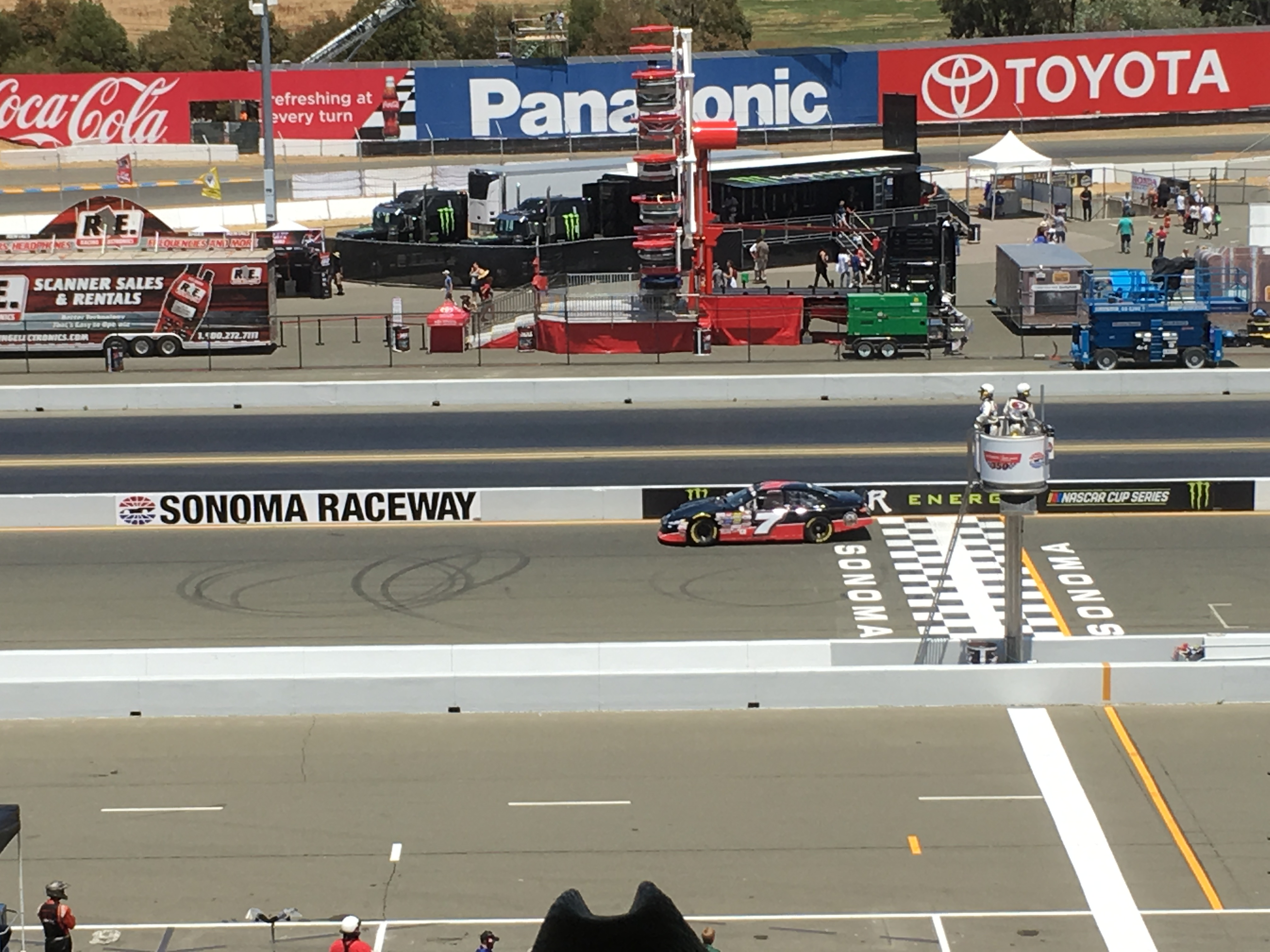
Rodgers crossing the start/finish line at Sonoma in 2017

Rodgers returned to the series in 2017, running full-time in the K&N Pro Series West for Jefferson Pitts Racing. He opened the season with four consecutive top-five finishes. At Sonoma, Rodgers qualified on pole position, earning his first career pole in the series. While he led early, Rodgers was eventually passed by 2014 NASCAR Sprint Cup Series champion Kevin Harvick, finishing second. Rodgers said after the race, "For some funny reason, I had a feeling as far back as four weeks ago that it was going to be me and Kevin coming into turn 11 on the last lap. And sure enough, there we were. He ran a really good race, I learned a lot from him. We were able to lead some laps there in the beginning. It doesn't feel too bad to finish second today." Harvick, meanwhile, was impressed with Rodgers' performance, stating, "That was really what this was all about, to shine a little light on a kid like Will and race against him and give him the recognition he deserves. I want to keep supporting the series and bring that bright light on some of these kids who need the opportunity." The race became a turning point for Rodgers' career; in May 2018, Autoweek writer Matt Weaver argued that Rodgers had "gained more from his graceful defeat than if he had won the race without the participation of a Cup Series veteran." Rodgers spoke of the race as having done "wonders for my career. We got a lot of attention....I can't say enough about how helpful Kevin was. He put me on his radio show and told the world that he respected me. That was huge." Rodgers ran the rest of the season for Pitts' team, adding another second-place finish at Evergreen Speedway.

Rodgers also ran the two road course races in the 2017 NASCAR K&N Pro Series East season. Rodgers earned his first career K&N Series win at Watkins Glen International, holding off Rubén García Jr. after García hit the wall attempting to overtake him. After the race, Harvick, despite not participating in the event, visited Rodgers in Victory Lane to congratulate him on the win. Rodgers also won the second road course race of the season at New Jersey Motorsports Park.

=== 2018: Road course dominance, ARCA debut ===
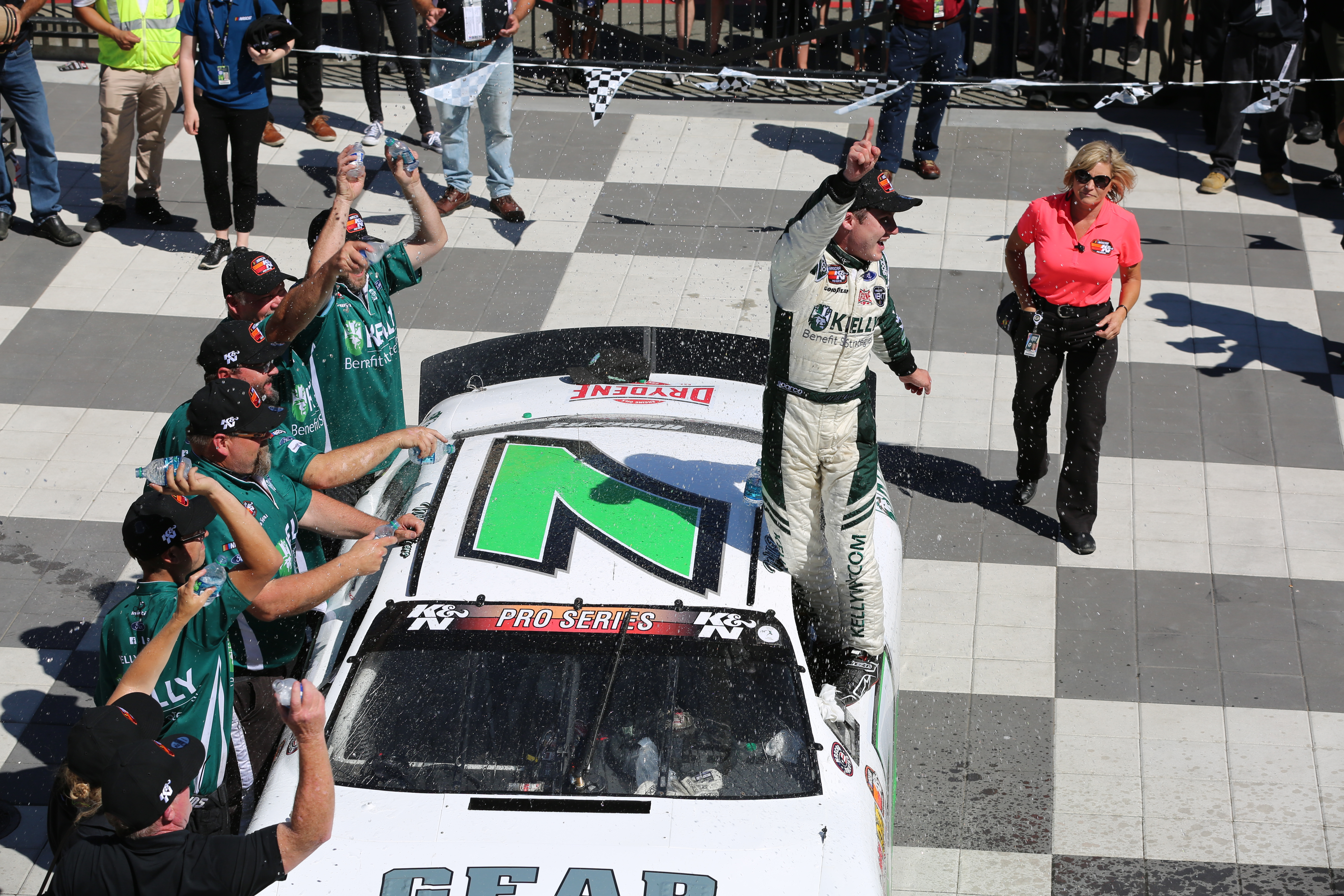
Rodgers celebrates his West Series win at Sonoma in 2018

In 2018, Rodgers returned to Jefferson Pitts Racing for the K&N West season opener at Kern County Raceway Park. After finishing a disappointing 16th, Rodgers moved to Bob Farmer's team for the doubleheader at Tucson Speedway. He finished ninth and seventh in the first and second race respectively.

On June 16, Rodgers returned to the East Series to run again at New Jersey Motorsports Park. He won the race after qualifying second and leading 49 of the 55 laps, earning his third road course victory in four such races at the K&N level and establishing himself as one of the series' road course ringers. Two days before the race, Harvick reaffirmed his support for Rodgers and argued, "When the road course stuff shows up, Will is probably capable of being in an Xfinity race or a Cup race. In the right equipment on a road course, he'd be a top-10 competitor." The next week, Rodgers returned to Sonoma for the K&N West race; while Harvick did not enter the 2018 race, a total of five Cup Series drivers (Aric Almirola, William Byron, Daniel Suárez, Erik Jones, and Alex Bowman) did participate. Rodgers beat all of them, qualifying on the pole and winning his fourth consecutive road course race at the K&N level. Rodgers later joined Levin Racing for the race at Gateway Motorsports Park.

Before the 2018 ARCA Racing Series season-opener at Daytona International Speedway, Rodgers was also announced as a driver for Ken Schrader Racing for select races, including Daytona. The race was Rodgers' first on an oval track longer than one mile in length. At Daytona, Rodgers was involved in an accident in turn 4 on lap 21, which led to him finishing 25 laps down in 30th place. Rodgers then rebounded to finish eighth in his next race at Charlotte Motor Speedway. Later in the season, he set a new career-best finish with a sixth-place run at Michigan International Speedway.

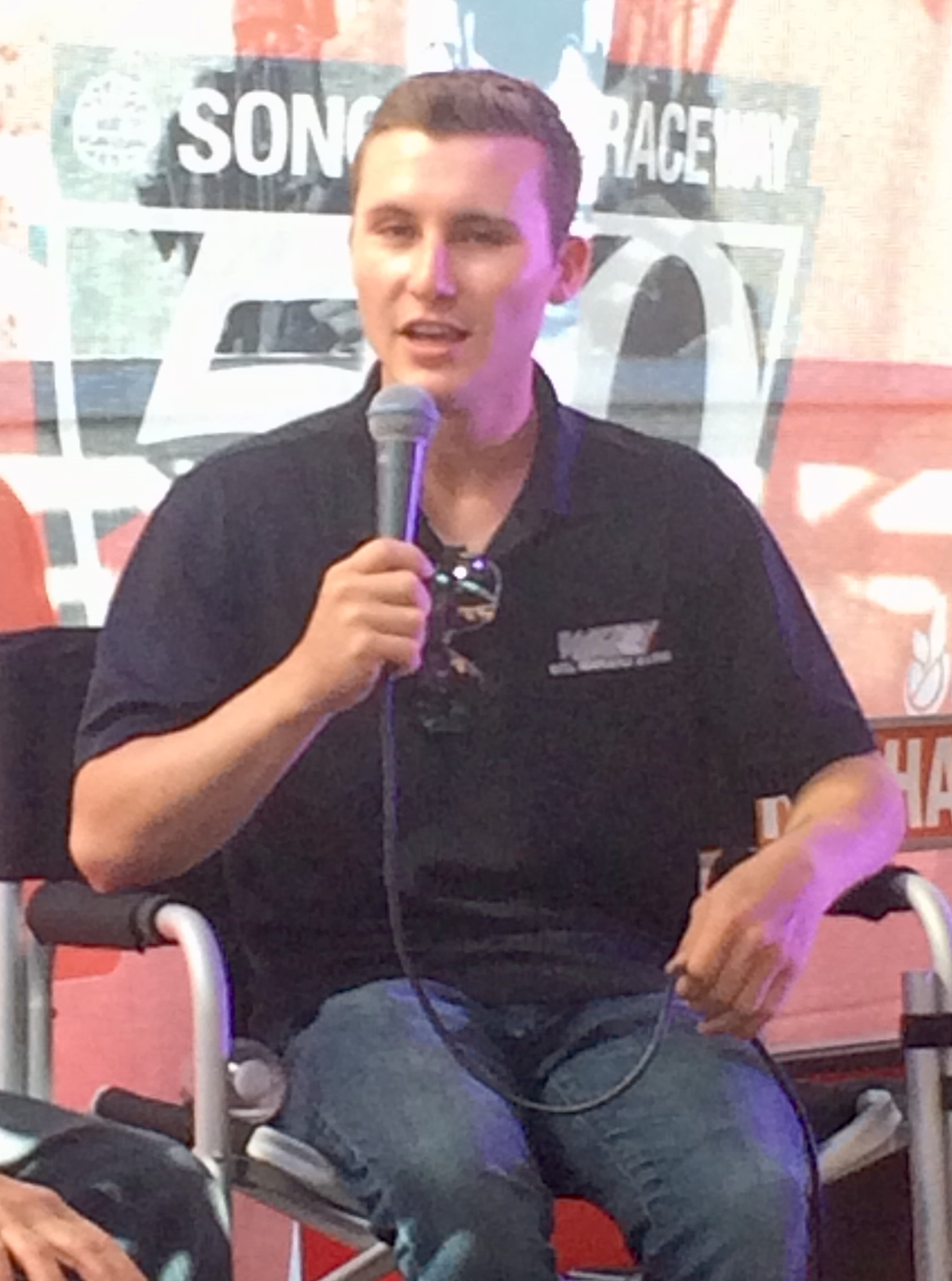
Rodgers at an at-track event during the Sonoma race weekend in 2019

=== 2019: K&N return at Sonoma and Xfinity debut ===
Rodgers began the 2019 season on the sidelines (working on the business aspect of his career by recruiting sponsors) but returned to Levin Racing for the K&N Pro Series West race at Sonoma. He spent the week leading up to the event serving as a driver coach to fellow K&N Pro Series driver Hailie Deegan.

In July, Rodgers joined Brandonbilt Motorsports for his NASCAR Xfinity Series debut in the U.S. Cellular 250 at Iowa Speedway.

=== 2021: Return to Xfinity Series ===
Rodgers returned to the Xfinity Series in June 2021 with Sam Hunt Racing on a three-race schedule at Nashville Superspeedway, the Indianapolis Motor Speedway road course, and the Charlotte Motor Speedway Roval. He had a best finish of 14th at Nashville.

=== 2022–2025: Sporadic NASCAR appearances ===
In 2022, Rodgers made two starts in the Xfinity Series, making one start apiece with RSS Racing and MBM Motorsports. He also made a one-off Truck Series start at the Circuit of the Americas, driving the No. 33 for Reaume Brothers Racing, where he finished in 21st.

In 2023, Rodgers made two Truck Series starts, this time for Young's Motorsports, at the Mid Ohio Sports Car Course and Richmond Raceway. It was also during this year where he won the championship in the Trans-Am West Coast Series.

After not racing in NASCAR in 2024, Rodgers returned to the Xfinity Series at Sonoma in the No. 70 Chevrolet for Cope Family Racing in 2025, where he finished in 16th. He also ran the Truck Series race for Young's Motorsports at the Charlotte Motor Speedway Roval, where he finished in 15th. It was during this time where he served as a spotter for Erik Jones in the NASCAR Cup Series.

=== 2026–present: Full-time in O'Reilly ===
In 2026, Rodgers made two starts in the now-renamed NASCAR O'Reilly Auto Parts Series, driving the No. 42 Chevrolet for Young's Motorsports at Watkins Glen and Sonoma, finishing 20th and 17th respectively. Later in the year, it was announced that he would run in three of the last four races of the O'Reilly schedule, driving the No. 53 Chevrolet for Joey Gase Motorsports with Scott Osteen in collaboration with Big Machine Racing.

On November 7, 2026, it was revealed that Rodgers will run full-time in the O'Reilly Series for the 2027 season, driving the No. 48 Chevrolet for BMR.

== Personal life ==
Rodgers was born in Maui, Hawaii and currently resides in Huntersville, North Carolina.

At the age of three, Rodgers was diagnosed with primary sclerosing cholangitis (PSC), a liver disease that resulted in numerous biopsies and colonoscopies during his youth. He runs the Will Rodgers Liver Health Foundation.

== Motorsports career results ==
=== NASCAR ===
(key) (Bold – Pole position awarded by qualifying time. Italics – Pole position earned by points standings or practice time. * – Most laps led.)

==== O'Reilly Auto Parts Series ====
NASCAR O'Reilly Auto Parts Series results
Year	Team	No.	Make	1	2	3	4	5	6	7	8	9	10	11	12	13	14	15	16	17	18	19	20	21	22	23	24	25	26	27	28	29	30	31	32	33	NOAPSC	Pts	Ref
2019	Brandonbilt Motorsports	68	Chevy	DAY	ATL	LVS	PHO	CAL	TEX	BRI	RCH	TAL	DOV	CLT	POC	MCH	IOW	CHI	DAY	KEN	NHA	IOW; 28	GLN														43rd	58	
2019	Brandonbilt Motorsports	86	Chevy																					MOH; 12	BRI	ROA	DAR	IND	LVS	RCH	ROV; 28	DOV	KAN	TEX	PHO	HOM; 22	43rd	58	
2021	Sam Hunt Racing	26	Toyota	DAY	DRC	HOM	LVS	PHO	ATL	MAR	TAL	DAR	DOV	COA	CLT	MOH	TEX	NSH; 14	POC	ROA	ATL	NHA	GLN									ROV; 29	TEX	KAN	MAR	PHO	91st	0^{1}	
2021	Sam Hunt Racing	24	Toyota																					IRC; 28	MCH	DAY	DAR	RCH	BRI	LVS	TAL						91st	0^{1}	
2022	Reaume Brothers Racing	33	Toyota	DAY	CAL; DNQ	LVS	PHO	ATL																													71st	2	
2022	RSS Racing	38	Toyota						COA; 37	RCH	MAR	TAL	DOV	DAR	TEX	CLT	PIR	NSH																			71st	2	
2022	MBM Motorsports	13	Toyota																ROA; 38	ATL	NHA	POC	IRC	MCH	GLN	DAY	DAR	KAN	BRI	TEX	TAL	ROV	LVS	HOM	MAR	PHO	71st	2	
2023	MBM Motorsports	66	Toyota	DAY	CAL	LVS	PHO	ATL	COA	RCH	MAR	TAL	DOV	DAR	CLT	PIR	SON	NSH	CSC	ATL	NHA	POC	ROA	MCH	IRC; DNQ	GLN	DAY	DAR	KAN	BRI	TEX	ROV	LVS	HOM	MAR	PHO	115th	0^{1}	
2025	Cope Family Racing	70	Chevy	DAY	ATL	COA	PHO	LVS	HOM	MAR	DAR	BRI	CAR	TAL	TEX	CLT	NSH	MXC	POC	ATL	CSC	SON; 16	DOV	IND	IOW	GLN	DAY	PIR	GTW	BRI	KAN	ROV	LVS	TAL	MAR	PHO	57th	23	
2026	Young's Motorsports	42	Chevy	DAY	ATL	COA	PHO	LVS	DAR	MAR	CAR	BRI	KAN	TAL	TEX	GLN; 20	DOV	CLT	NSH	POC	COR	SON; 17	CHI	ATL	IND	IOW	DAY	DAR	GTW	BRI	LVS	CLT					36th	85	
2026	Joey Gase Motorsports with Scott Osteen	53	Chevy																														PHO; 29	TAL; 25	MAR	HOM; 13	36th	85	
2027	Big Machine Racing	48	Chevy	DAY	ATL	COA	PHO	LVS	DAR	BRI	MAR	TAL	TEX	DOV	NWS	CLT	NSS	POC	CHI	IOW	SON	IND	COR	BRI	GTW	DAY	DAR	RCH	GLN	KAN	LVS	CLT	PHO	TAL	MAR	HOM			

==== Craftsman Truck Series ====
NASCAR Craftsman Truck Series results
Year	Team	No.	Make	1	2	3	4	5	6	7	8	9	10	11	12	13	14	15	16	17	18	19	20	21	22	23	24	25	NCTC	Pts	Ref
2021	Cram Racing Enterprises	41	Chevy	DAY	DRC	LVS	ATL	BRD	RCH	KAN	DAR	COA	CLT	TEX	NSH	POC	KNX	GLN; 39	GTW	DAR	BRI	LVS	TAL	MAR					74th	15	
2021	Reaume Brothers Racing	34	Toyota																						PHO; 22				74th	15	
2022	Reaume Brothers Racing	33	Toyota	DAY	LVS	ATL	COA; 21	MAR	BRD	DAR	KAN	TEX	CLT	GTW	SON	KNX	NSH	MOH	POC	IRP	RCH	KAN	BRI	TAL	HOM	PHO			99th	0^{1}	
2023	Young's Motorsports	02	Chevy	DAY	LVS	ATL	COA	TEX	BRD	MAR	KAN	DAR	NWS	CLT	GTW	NSH	MOH; 34	POC	RCH; 26	IRP	MLW	KAN	BRI	TAL	HOM	PHO			62nd	19	
2025	Young's Motorsports	20	Chevy	DAY	ATL	LVS	HOM	MAR	BRI	CAR	TEX	KAN	NWS	CLT	NSH	MCH	POC	LRP	IRP	GLN	RCH	DAR	BRI	NHA	ROV; 15	TAL	MAR	PHO	97th	0^{1}	

^{*} Season still in progress
^{1} Ineligible for series points

=== ARCA Menards Series ===
(key) (Bold – Pole position awarded by qualifying time. Italics – Pole position earned by points standings or practice time. * – Most laps led.)

ARCA Menards Series results
Year	Team	No.	Make	1	2	3	4	5	6	7	8	9	10	11	12	13	14	15	16	17	18	19	20	AMSC	Pts	Ref
2018	Ken Schrader Racing	52	Ford	DAY; 30	NSH	SLM	TAL	TOL		POC; 18	MCH; 6	MAD	GTW	CHI; 9	IOW	ELK	POC; 8	ISF	BLN	DSF	SLM	IRP	KAN	22nd	985	
2018	Ken Schrader Racing	11	Ford						CLT; 8															22nd	985	
2020	Steve McGowan Motorsports	17W	Chevy	DAY	PHO	TAL	POC	IRP	KEN	IOW	KAN	TOL	TOL	MCH	DRC; 5	GTW	I44	TOL	BRI	WIN	MEM	ISF	KAN	53rd	39	

==== K&N Pro Series East ====
NASCAR K&N Pro Series East results
Year	Team	No.	Make	1	2	3	4	5	6	7	8	9	10	11	12	13	14	NKNPSEC	Pts	Ref
2017	Jefferson Pitts Racing	7	Ford	NSM	GRE	BRI	SBO	SBO	MEM	BLN	TMP	NHA	IOW	GLN; 1	LGY	NJM; 1*	DOV	22nd	95	
2018	Jefferson Pitts Racing	7	Ford	NSM	BRI	LGY	SBO	SBO	MEM	NJM; 1*	TMP	NHA	IOW	GLN; 2*				23rd	110	
2018	Levin Racing	10	Chevy												GTW; 26	NHA	DOV	23rd	110	

==== ARCA Menards Series West ====
ARCA Menards Series West results
Year	Team	No.	Make	1	2	3	4	5	6	7	8	9	10	11	12	13	14	AMSWC	Pts	Ref
2016	DeLong Racing	84	Chevy	IRW	KCR	TUS	OSS	CNS; Wth										16th	201	
2016	Dave Hanson	06	Chevy						SON; 17	SLS; 8	IOW; 10							16th	201	
2016	Dave Hanson	06	Toyota									EVG; 14	DCS					16th	201	
2016	Dave Hanson	06	Ford											MMP; 7	MMP; 7	MER	AAS	16th	201	
2017	Jefferson Pitts Racing	7	Ford	TUS; 5	KCR; 3	IRW; 5	IRW; 5	SPO; 19	OSS; 20	CNS; 9	**SON**; 2*		EVG; 2	DCS; 4	MER; 3	AAS; 5	KCR; 8	5th	520	
2017	Jefferson Pitts Racing	27	Ford									IOW; 8						5th	520	
2018	Jefferson Pitts Racing	7	Ford	KCR; 16					**SON**; 1*									12th	230	
2018	REF Motorsports	4	Ford		TUS; 9	TUS; 7	OSS; 11	CNS		DCS; Wth	IOW	EVG; 13						12th	230	
2018	Levin Racing	10	Chevy										GTW; 26	LVS	MER	AAS	KCR	12th	230	
2019	Levin Racing	40	Ford	LVS	IRW	TUS	TUS	CNS	SON; 6	DCS	IOW	EVG	GTW	MER	AAS	KCR	PHO	42nd	38	
2020	Jefferson Racing	42	Chevy	LVS	MMP; 5	MMP; 8	IRW	EVG	DCS	CNS	LVS	AAS	KCR	PHO				30th	75	
2025	Naake-Klauer Motorsports	88	Ford	KER	PHO	TUC	CNS	KER	SON; 25	TRI	PIR	AAS	MAD	LVS	PHO			76th	19	

=== Pirelli World Challenge results ===
Year	Team	Make	Model	Class	1	2	3	4	5	6	7	8	9	10	11	12	Rank	Points
2016	Hale Motorsports	Mazda	Mazda2	TCB	COA1; DSQ	COA2; 1	MOS1; 3	MOS2; 1	LRP1; 1	LRP2; 2	ELK1	ELK2	UTA1	UTA2	LAG1; 1	LAG2; 1	7th	752
