= 2021 Pennzoil 150 =

2021 Pennzoil 150 at the Brickyard
Race details
- Race 21 of 33 in the 2021 NASCAR Xfinity Series
- Date: August 14, 2021
- Location: Speedway, Indiana, Indianapolis Motor Speedway
- Course: Permanent racing facility
- Course length: 2.439 miles (3.925 km)
- Distance: 62 laps, 151.218 mi (243.362 km)
- Average speed: 73.825 miles per hour (118.810 km/h)

Pole position
Driver	A. J. Allmendinger	Kaulig Racing
- Time: 89.831

Most laps led
Driver	Austin Cindric	Team Penske
- Laps: 29

Winner
No. 22	Austin Cindric	Team Penske

Television in the United States
- Network: NBCSN

The 2021 Pennzoil 150 at the Brickyard was the 21st stock car race of the 2021 NASCAR Xfinity Series, the 10th iteration of the event, and the second NASCAR Xfinity Series has used the road course at Indianapolis. The race was held on Saturday, August 14, 2021, at Speedway, Indiana in Indianapolis Motor Speedway road course, a 2.439 miles (3.925 km) road course built inside of the speedway. The race took 62 laps to complete. Austin Cindric of Team Penske would win the race, while A. J. Allmendinger of Kaulig Racing and Justin Haley of Kaulig Racing finished 2nd and 3rd respectively.

== Background ==
The layout of the Indianapolis Motor Speedway NASCAR used.

The Indianapolis Motor Speedway, located in Speedway, Indiana, (an enclave suburb of Indianapolis) in the United States, is the home of the Indianapolis 500 and the Brickyard 400. It is located on the corner of 16th Street and Georgetown Road, approximately six miles (10 km) west of Downtown Indianapolis.

Constructed in 1909, it is the original speedway, the first racing facility so named. It has a permanent seating capacity estimated at 235,000 with infield seating raising capacity to an approximate 400,000. It is the highest-capacity sports venue in the world.

=== Entry list ===
#	Driver	Team	Make
0	Spencer Pumpelly	JD Motorsports	Chevrolet
1	Michael Annett*	JR Motorsports	Chevrolet
2	Myatt Snider	Richard Childress Racing	Chevrolet
02	Brett Moffitt	Our Motorsports	Chevrolet
4	Landon Cassill	JD Motorsports	Chevrolet
5	Kyle Tilley**	B. J. McLeod Motorsports	Toyota
6	Ryan Eversley	JD Motorsports	Chevrolet
7	Justin Allgaier	JR Motorsports	Chevrolet
07	Josh Bilicki	SS-Green Light Racing	Chevrolet
8	Sam Mayer	JR Motorsports	Chevrolet
9	Noah Gragson	JR Motorsports	Chevrolet
10	Jeb Burton	Kaulig Racing	Chevrolet
11	Justin Haley	Kaulig Racing	Chevrolet
13	Stephen Leicht	MBM Motorsports	Toyota
15	Mike Skeen	JD Motorsports	Chevrolet
16	A. J. Allmendinger	Kaulig Racing	Chevrolet
17	Max Papis***	SS-Green Light Racing with Rick Ware Racing	Chevrolet
18	Daniel Hemric	Joe Gibbs Racing	Toyota
19	Brandon Jones	Joe Gibbs Racing	Toyota
20	Harrison Burton	Joe Gibbs Racing	Toyota
22	Austin Cindric	Team Penske	Ford
23	Austin Dillon (i)	Our Motorsports	Chevrolet
24	Will Rodgers	Sam Hunt Racing	Toyota
26	Kris Wright	Sam Hunt Racing	Toyota
31	Sage Karam	Jordan Anderson Racing	Chevrolet
33	Loris Hezemans	Reaume Brothers Racing	Chevrolet
36	Alex Labbé	DGM Racing	Chevrolet
39	Ryan Sieg	RSS Racing	Ford
42	Giorgio Maggi	MBM Motorsports	Toyota
44	Tommy Joe Martins	Martins Motorsports	Chevrolet
47	Kyle Weatherman	Mike Harmon Racing	Chevrolet
48	Jade Buford	Big Machine Racing Team	Chevrolet
51	Jeremy Clements	Jeremy Clements Racing	Chevrolet
52	Gray Gaulding	Jimmy Means Racing	Chevrolet
54	Ty Gibbs	Kyle Busch Motorsports	Toyota
61	Austin Hill	Hattori Racing Enterprises	Toyota
66	Matt Jaskol	MBM Motorsports	Toyota
68	Brandon Brown	Brandonbilt Motorsports	Chevrolet
74	Bayley Currey	Mike Harmon Racing	Chevrolet
78	Andy Lally	B. J. McLeod Motorsports	Chevrolet
90	Preston Pardus	DGM Racing	Chevrolet
92	Josh Williams	DGM Racing	Chevrolet
98	Riley Herbst	Stewart-Haas Racing	Ford
99	Kevin Harvick (i)	B. J. McLeod Motorsports	Chevrolet

*Driver would change to Chase Elliott due to Annett's leg injury.

**Driver changed to James Davison due to Tilley's shoulder injury.

***Driver changed to J. J. Yeley due to Max Papis testing positive for COVID-19 during the weekend.

== Practice ==
The first and final practice would take place on Friday, August 13. Austin Cindric of Team Penske would set the fastest time.

Pos.	#	Driver	Team	Make	Time	Speed
1	22	Austin Cindric	Team Penske	Ford	1:32.276	95.154
2	8	Sam Mayer	JR Motorsports	Chevrolet	1:32.459	94.965
3	11	Justin Haley	Kaulig Racing	Chevrolet	1:32.601	94.820
Full practice results

== Qualifying ==
Qualifying would take place on Saturday, August 14, starting at 11:03 EST. A. J. Allmendinger of Kaulig Racing would set the fastest time.

8 drivers would fail to qualify: the #15 of Mike Skeen, the #66 of Matt Jaskol, the #74 of Bayley Currey, the #13 of Stephen Leicht, the #6 of Ryan Eversley, the #33 of Loris Hezemans, the #42 of Giorgio Maggi, and the #52 of Gray Gaulding.

Pos.	#	Driver	Team	Make	Time	Speed
1	16	A.J. Allmendinger	Kaulig Racing	Chevrolet	1:29.831	97.744
2	22	Austin Cindric	Team Penske	Ford	1:30.158	97.389
3	11	Justin Haley	Kaulig Racing	Chevrolet	1:30.232	97.309
4	7	Justin Allgaier	JR Motorsports	Chevrolet	1:30.322	97.212
5	54	Ty Gibbs	Kyle Busch Motorsports	Toyota	1:30.581	96.934
6	98	Riley Herbst	Stewart-Haas Racing	Ford	1:30.695	96.812
7	9	Noah Gragson	JR Motorsports	Chevrolet	1:30.830	96.669
8	2	Myatt Snider	Richard Childress Racing	Chevrolet	1:31.241	96.233
9	24	Will Rodgers	Sam Hunt Racing	Toyota	1:31.326	96.143
10	90	Preston Pardus	DGM Racing	Chevrolet	1:31.339	96.130
11	20	Harrison Burton	Joe Gibbs Racing	Toyota	1:31.557	95.901
12	19	Brandon Jones	Joe Gibbs Racing	Toyota	1:31.624	95.831
13	18	Daniel Hemric	Joe Gibbs Racing	Toyota	1:31.200	96.276
14	68	Brandon Brown	Brandonbilt Motorsports	Chevrolet	1:31.327	96.142
15	48	Jade Buford	Big Machine Racing Team	Chevrolet	1:31.359	96.109
16	99	Kevin Harvick	B. J. McLeod Motorsports	Chevrolet	1:31.361	96.107
17	02	Brett Moffitt	Our Motorsports	Chevrolet	1:31.418	96.047
18	31	Sage Karam	Jordan Anderson Racing	Chevrolet	1:31.505	95.955
19	23	Austin Dillon	Our Motorsports	Chevrolet	1:31.584	95.873
20	51	Jeremy Clements	Jeremy Clements Racing	Chevrolet	1:31.612	95.843
21	36	Alex Labbé	DGM Racing	Chevrolet	1:31.628	95.827
22	07	Josh Bilicki	SS-Green Light Racing	Chevrolet	1:31.674	95.779
23	10	Jeb Burton	Kaulig Racing	Chevrolet	1:31.686	95.766
24	8	Sam Mayer	JR Motorsports	Chevrolet	1:31.712	95.739
25	1	Chase Elliott	JR Motorsports	Chevrolet	1:31.779	95.669
26	78	Andy Lally	B. J. McLeod Motorsports	Chevrolet	1:31.783	95.665
27	47	Kyle Weatherman	Mike Harmon Racing	Chevrolet	1:31.856	95.589
28	61	Austin Hill	Hattori Racing Enterprises	Toyota	1:31.863	95.581
29	0	Spencer Pumpelly	JD Motorsports	Chevrolet	1:32.132	95.302
30	26	Kris Wright	Sam Hunt Racing	Toyota	1:32.217	95.215
31	92	Josh Williams	DGM Racing	Chevrolet	1:32.524	94.899
Qualified by owner's points
32	44	Tommy Joe Martins	Martins Motorsports	Chevrolet	1:32.538	94.884
33	4	Landon Cassill	JD Motorsports	Chevrolet	1:32.916	94.498
34	5	James Davison	B. J. McLeod Motorsports	Toyota	1:33.262	94.148
35	39	Ryan Sieg	RSS Racing	Ford	1:33.721	93.687
36	17	J.J. Yeley	SS-Green Light Racing with Rick Ware Racing	Chevrolet	1:34.364	93.048
Did not qualify
37	15	Mike Skeen	JD Motorsports	Chevrolet	1:32.558	94.864
38	66	Matt Jaskol	MBM Motorsports	Toyota	1:32.606	94.815
39	74	Bayley Currey	Mike Harmon Racing	Chevrolet	1:32.675	94.744
40	13	Stephen Leicht	MBM Motorsports	Toyota	1:32.706	94.712
41	6	Ryan Eversley	JD Motorsports	Chevrolet	1:32.893	94.522
42	33	Loris Hezemans	Reaume Brothers Racing	Chevrolet	1:33.519	93.889
43	42	Giorgio Maggi	MBM Motorsports	Toyota	1:33.597	93.811
44	52	Gray Gaulding	Jimmy Means Racing	Chevrolet	1:33.839	93.569
Official starting lineup

== Race results ==
Stage 1 Laps: 20

Fin	#	Driver	Team	Make	Pts
1	11	Justin Haley	Kaulig Racing	Chevrolet	10
2	98	Riley Herbst	Stewart-Haas Racing	Ford	9
3	10	Jeb Burton	Kaulig Racing	Chevrolet	8
4	22	Austin Cindric	Team Penske	Ford	7
5	31	Sage Karam	Jordan Anderson Racing	Chevrolet	6
6	9	Noah Gragson	JR Motorsports	Chevrolet	5
7	51	Jeremy Clements	Jeremy Clements Racing	Chevrolet	4
8	44	Tommy Joe Martins	Martins Motorsports	Chevrolet	3
9	1	Chase Elliott	JR Motorsports	Chevrolet	0
10	54	Ty Gibbs	Kyle Busch Motorsports	Toyota	1

Stage 2 Laps: 20

Fin	#	Driver	Team	Make	Pts
1	16	A.J. Allmendinger	Kaulig Racing	Chevrolet	10
2	11	Justin Haley	Kaulig Racing	Chevrolet	9
3	9	Noah Gragson	JR Motorsports	Chevrolet	8
4	54	Ty Gibbs	Kyle Busch Motorsports	Toyota	7
5	78	Andy Lally	B. J. McLeod Motorsports	Chevrolet	6
6	10	Jeb Burton	Kaulig Racing	Chevrolet	5
7	18	Daniel Hemric	Joe Gibbs Racing	Toyota	4
8	51	Jeremy Clements	Jeremy Clements Racing	Chevrolet	3
9	98	Riley Herbst	Stewart-Haas Racing	Ford	2
10	92	Josh Williams	DGM Racing	Chevrolet	1

Stage 3 Laps: 20

Fin	St	#	Driver	Team	Make	Laps	Led	Status	Pts
1	2	22	Austin Cindric	Team Penske	Ford	62	29	running	47
2	1	16	A.J. Allmendinger	Kaulig Racing	Chevrolet	62	8	running	45
3	3	11	Justin Haley	Kaulig Racing	Chevrolet	62	18	running	53
4	25	1	Chase Elliott	JR Motorsports	Chevrolet	62	0	running	0
5	7	9	Noah Gragson	JR Motorsports	Chevrolet	62	0	running	45
6	19	23	Austin Dillon	Our Motorsports	Chevrolet	62	0	running	0
7	8	2	Myatt Snider	Richard Childress Racing	Chevrolet	62	0	running	30
8	6	98	Riley Herbst	Stewart-Haas Racing	Ford	62	3	running	40
9	11	20	Harrison Burton	Joe Gibbs Racing	Toyota	62	0	running	28
10	26	78	Andy Lally	B. J. McLeod Motorsports	Chevrolet	62	0	running	33
11	4	7	Justin Allgaier	JR Motorsports	Chevrolet	62	0	running	26
12	13	18	Daniel Hemric	Joe Gibbs Racing	Toyota	62	0	running	29
13	21	36	Alex Labbé	DGM Racing	Chevrolet	62	0	running	24
14	20	51	Jeremy Clements	Jeremy Clements Racing	Chevrolet	62	0	running	30
15	31	92	Josh Williams	DGM Racing	Chevrolet	62	0	running	23
16	27	47	Kyle Weatherman	Mike Harmon Racing	Chevrolet	62	0	running	21
17	33	4	Landon Cassill	JD Motorsports	Chevrolet	62	0	running	20
18	34	5	James Davison	B. J. McLeod Motorsports	Toyota	62	0	running	0
19	5	54	Ty Gibbs	Kyle Busch Motorsports	Toyota	62	4	running	26
20	15	48	Jade Buford	Big Machine Racing Team	Chevrolet	62	0	running	17
21	32	44	Tommy Joe Martins	Martins Motorsports	Chevrolet	62	0	running	19
22	36	17	J.J. Yeley	SS-Green Light Racing with Rick Ware Racing	Chevrolet	62	0	running	15
23	23	10	Jeb Burton	Kaulig Racing	Chevrolet	62	0	running	27
24	29	0	Spencer Pumpelly	JD Motorsports	Chevrolet	60	0	ignition	13
25	22	07	Josh Bilicki	SS-Green Light Racing	Chevrolet	60	0	running	0
26	18	31	Sage Karam	Jordan Anderson Racing	Chevrolet	59	0	electrical	17
27	24	8	Sam Mayer	JR Motorsports	Chevrolet	44	0	accident	10
28	9	24	Will Rodgers	Sam Hunt Racing	Toyota	37	0	brakes	9
29	28	61	Austin Hill	Hattori Racing Enterprises	Toyota	27	0	steering box	0
30	30	26	Kris Wright	Sam Hunt Racing	Toyota	23	0	accident	0
31	17	02	Brett Moffitt	Our Motorsports	Chevrolet	21	0	axle	0
32	35	39	Ryan Sieg	RSS Racing	Ford	14	0	suspension	5
33	16	99	Kevin Harvick	B. J. McLeod Motorsports	Chevrolet	1	0	power steering	0
34	14	68	Brandon Brown	Brandonbilt Motorsports	Chevrolet	1	0	accident	3
35	10	90	Preston Pardus	DGM Racing	Chevrolet	1	0	accident	2
36	12	19	Brandon Jones	Joe Gibbs Racing	Toyota	0	0	accident	0
Did not qualify
37		15	Mike Skeen	JD Motorsports	Chevrolet				
38		66	Matt Jaskol	MBM Motorsports	Toyota				
39		74	Bayley Currey	Mike Harmon Racing	Chevrolet				
40		13	Stephen Leicht	MBM Motorsports	Toyota				
41		6	Ryan Eversley	JD Motorsports	Chevrolet				
42		33	Loris Hezemans	Reaume Brothers Racing	Chevrolet				
43		42	Giorgio Maggi	MBM Motorsports	Toyota				
44		52	Gray Gaulding	Jimmy Means Racing	Chevrolet				
Official race results

Previous race: 2021 Skrewball Peanut Butter Whiskey 200 at The Glen	NASCAR Xfinity Series; 2021 season	Next race: 2021 New Holland 250
