= 2027 NASCAR O'Reilly Auto Parts Series =

American motorsport season

The 2027 NASCAR O'Reilly Auto Parts Series will be the 46th season of the NASCAR O'Reilly Auto Parts Series, a stock car racing series sanctioned by NASCAR in the United States. The season will start on February 20 with the United Rentals 300 at Daytona International Speedway, and will end at Homestead–Miami Speedway on November 13.

Justin Allgaier of JR Motorsports will enter the season as the defending O'Reilly Auto Parts Series champion.

Justin Allgaier enters the season as the defending O'Reilly Auto Parts Series champion.

== Teams and drivers ==
The following teams and drivers are confirmed to be returning in 2027:

=== Full-time teams ===
| Manufacturer | Team | No. | Driver | Crew chief | Note |
|---|---|---|---|---|---|
| Chevrolet | Big Machine Racing | 48 | Will Rodgers | TBA | Patrick Staropoli will not return to BMR in 2027. Rodgers will replace him in the No. 48. |
| Chevrolet | DGM Racing | 92 | Josh Williams | TBA | Williams is set to still race for DGM in 2027. |
| Chevrolet | Haas Factory Team | 00 | Dean Thompson | TBA | Sheldon Creed will not return to HFT in 2027, leaving for Sam Hunt Racing. Thompson is joining HFT in 2027 and replacing Creed. |
| Chevrolet | Haas Factory Team | 41 | John Hunter Nemechek | TBA | Sam Mayer will not return to HFT in 2027 as he returns to JRM. Nemechek is joining HFT in 2027. |
| Chevrolet | Haas Factory Team | TBA | TBA | TBA | HFT will expand to three cars. |
| Chevrolet | Hendrick Motorsports | 17 | Corey Day | TBA | Day will return to HMS in 2027. |
| Chevrolet | Jeremy Clements Racing | 51 | Jeremy Clements | TBA | Clements is likely to return to JCR in 2027. |
| Chevrolet | Jordan Anderson Racing | 27 | TBA | Mark Setzer | Jeb Burton left for RSS Racing. This car will run full-time again in 2027 and will be the team's "all-star car" driven by multiple drivers. |
| Chevrolet | Jordan Anderson Racing | 31 | Brennan Poole | Frankie Kerr | Blaine Perkins left for Sam Hunt Racing. Poole will run full-time for JAR in the No. 31 for 2027. |
| Chevrolet | Jordan Anderson Racing | 32 | Daniel Dye | J. C. Umscheid | Dye will run full-time for JAR in the No. 32 for 2027. |
| Chevrolet | JR Motorsports | 1 | Sam Mayer | TBA | Carson Kvapil will remain at JRM but will move from the No. 1 to the No. 8. Mayer is returning to JRM for 2027. |
| Chevrolet | JR Motorsports | 7 | Justin Allgaier | TBA | Allgaier signed a multi-year contract extension with JRM in 2026. |
| Chevrolet | JR Motorsports | 8 | Carson Kvapil | TBA | Sammy Smith announced that he would not return to the team for 2027. Kvapil will remain at JRM but will move from the No. 1 to the No. 8 to replace Smith. |
| Chevrolet | JR Motorsports | 9 | Tristan McKee TBA | TBA | McKee will run a partial schedule for JRM in 2027. |
| Chevrolet | JR Motorsports | 9 | Ross Chastain TBA | TBA | Chastain and van Gisbergen will both run partial schedules for JRM in 2027. |
| Chevrolet | JR Motorsports | 9 | Shane van Gisbergen TBA | TBA | Chastain and van Gisbergen will both run partial schedules for JRM in 2027. |
| Chevrolet | JR Motorsports | 88 | Rajah Caruth | TBA | Caruth will return to JRM in 2027. |
| Chevrolet | Peterson Racing | 78 | Harrison Burton | TBA | Harrison Burton will join Peterson Racing in 2027 in the team's new second entry. |
| Chevrolet | Peterson Racing | 87 | Lee Pulliam (R) | TBA | Pulliam will join Peterson Racing in 2027. |
| Chevrolet | Richard Childress Racing | 2 | Carson Brown (R) | TBA | Jesse Love moved up to the Cup Series with Wood Brothers Racing. Brown will replace him in the No. 2 and run for Rookie of the Year. |
| Chevrolet | Richard Childress Racing | 21 | Chandler Smith | TBA | Austin Hill will run full-time in the Cup Series for RCR in 2027. Smith will return to the series full-time for the first time since 2024. |
| Chevrolet | RSS Racing | 22 | Jeb Burton | TBA | Jeb Burton will join RSS Racing in 2027. |
| Chevrolet | RSS Racing | 28 | Kyle Sieg | TBA | Kyle Sieg is likely to return to RSS in 2027. |
| Chevrolet | RSS Racing | 39 | Ryan Sieg | TBA | Ryan Sieg is likely to return to RSS in 2027. |
| Chevrolet | Viking Motorsports | 96 | Anthony Alfredo | Joshua Graham | Alfredo and Retzlaff will both return to Viking Motorsports in 2027. |
| Chevrolet | Viking Motorsports | 99 | Parker Retzlaff | Danny Efland | Alfredo and Retzlaff will both return to Viking Motorsports in 2027. |
| Chevrolet | Young's Motorsports | 02 | TBA | TBA | Ryan Ellis will not return to Young's Motorsports in 2027 as he returns to Alpha Prime Racing. |
| Ford | Alpha Prime Racing | 44 | Ryan Ellis | TBA | APR will switch to Ford for 2027. Brennan Poole left for JAR. Ellis signed a multi year deal with APR. |
| Ford | Alpha Prime Racing | 45 | TBA | TBA | APR will switch to Ford for 2027. |
| Toyota | Joe Gibbs Racing | 18 | William Sawalich | TBA | Sawalich will return to JGR in 2027. |
| Toyota | Joe Gibbs Racing | 19 | Brent Crews | TBA | Crews is likely to return to JGR in 2027. |
| Toyota | Joe Gibbs Racing | 20 | Brandon Jones | Sam McAulay | Jones will return to JGR in 2027. |
| Toyota | Joe Gibbs Racing | 54 | Taylor Gray | Jason Ratcliff | Gray and Ratcliff will return to JGR in 2027. |
| Toyota | Sam Hunt Racing | 24 | Blaine Perkins | Brian Gainey | Perkins will move to SHR in 2027. He replaces Harrison Burton, who left for Peterson Racing. |
| Toyota | Sam Hunt Racing | 26 | Sheldon Creed | Kris Bowen | Creed will drive the No. 26 in 2027 after signing a multi-year deal. He replaces Dean Thompson, who left for Haas Factory Team. |
| TBA | Joey Gase Motorsports | 55 | Joey Gase | TBA | Gase is expected to return to his own team in 2027. |

=== Part-time teams ===
| Manufacturer | Team | No. | Driver | Crew chief | Races | Notes |
|---|---|---|---|---|---|---|
| Chevrolet | Pardus Racing | 50 | Preston Pardus | TBA | TBA | Pardus is expected to return for his own team in 2027. |
| Chevrolet | Richard Childress Racing | 33 | Garrett Mitchell | TBA | 4 | Mitchell signed a two-year deal with RCR to run part-time in the O'Reilly Series and will return for his second year in 2027. |
| Ford | Alpha Prime Racing | 4 | Caesar Bacarella | TBA | TBA | Bacarella is expected to return to APR in 2027 as co-owner. |

=== Team changes ===
Haas Factory Team will expand to three full-time cars with Dean Thompson driving their new third car. Peterson Racing will expand to two full-time cars with the addition of Harrison Burton in the No. 78.

=== Driver changes ===
Rookies

Lee Pulliam will be driving full-time in the No. 87 for Peterson Racing. Carson Brown will be driving full-time in the No. 2 for Richard Childress Racing, replacing Jesse Love.

Moving between series

Both Jesse Love and Austin Hill will move up to the NASCAR Cup Series full-time in 2027. Love will move to Wood Brothers Racing, while Hill will remain at Richard Childress Racing moving up to their Cup program full-time. Chandler Smith, who previously drove for Front Row Motorsports in the Truck Series, returned to the O'Reilly Series for the first time since 2024, replacing Hill in the RCR No. 21. Sammy Smith will move down to the Truck Series driving for Tricon Garage. John Hunter Nemechek will move down from the Cup Series and replace Sam Mayer in the HFT No. 41 car.

Moving between teams

Sam Mayer and Sheldon Creed will move from Haas Factory Team to JR Motorsports and Sam Hunt Racing, respectively. Dean Thompson will move from Sam Hunt Racing to Haas Factory Team. Jeb Burton will move from Jordan Anderson Racing to RSS Racing. Harrison Burton will move from Sam Hunt Racing to Peterson Racing. Blaine Perkins will move from Jordan Anderson Racing to Sam Hunt Racing. Ryan Ellis will move from Young's Motorsports to Alpha Prime Racing. Brennan Poole will move from Alpha Prime Racing to JAR. Will Rodgers will compete full time for Big Machine Racing after competing part time for Young's Motorsports and Joey Gase Motorsports, but will likely not be eligible for rookie of the year due to him already exceeding the 10 race limit.

=== Manufacturer changes ===
Alpha Prime Racing switched from Chevrolet to Ford for 2027.

== Rule changes ==
=== Policy changes ===
==== Superspeedway qualifying ====
Qualifying for superspeedway races at Daytona International Speedway, Atlanta Motor Speedway (EchoPark), and Talladega Superspeedway will feature one round of qualifying rather than two in previous years.

==== Inclement weather policy ====
Should a qualifying session get canceled due to inclement weather, owner's points will be used for deciding the starting lineup. The old "NASCAR Performance Metric" relied heavily on the previous race finish and will not be used for the season opening race.

==== New penalty level ====
The L3 penalty that was in the Cup Series was added to the O'Reilly and Truck Series.

== Schedule ==
The NASCAR O'Reilly Auto Parts Series schedule was fully unveiled on August 26, 2026, and consists of 29 oval races, 3 road course races, and 1 street race.

Notes: Race names and title sponsors are subject to change. Not all title sponsors/names of races have been announced for 2027. For the races where a 2027 name and title sponsor has yet to be announced, the title sponsors/names of those races in 2026 are listed.

O Oval track
R Road course
S Street course

| No | Race title | Track | Location | Date |
|---|---|---|---|---|
| 1 | United Rentals 300 | O Daytona International Speedway | Daytona Beach, Florida | February 20 |
| 2 | Bennett Transportation & Logistics 250 | O EchoPark Speedway | Hampton, Georgia | February 27 |
| 3 | Focused Health 250 | R Circuit of the Americas | Austin, Texas | March 6 |
| 4 | GOVX 200 | O Phoenix Raceway | Avondale, Arizona | March 13 |
| 5 | The LiUNA! | O Las Vegas Motor Speedway | Las Vegas, Nevada | March 20 |
| 6 | Sport Clips Haircuts VFW Help A Hero 200 | O Darlington Raceway | Darlington, South Carolina | April 3 |
| 7 | Suburban Propane 300 | O Bristol Motor Speedway | Bristol, Tennessee | April 10 |
| 8 | NFPA 250 | O Martinsville Speedway | Ridgeway, Virginia | April 17 |
| 9 | Ag-Pro 300 | O Talladega Superspeedway | Lincoln, Alabama | April 24 |
| 10 | Andy's Frozen Custard 300 | O Texas Motor Speedway | Fort Worth, Texas | May 1 |
| 11 | BetRivers 200 | O Dover Motor Speedway | Dover, Delaware | May 15 |
| 12 | TBA | O North Wilkesboro Speedway | North Wilkesboro, North Carolina | May 22 |
| 13 | Charbroil 300 | O Charlotte Motor Speedway | Concord, North Carolina | May 29 |
| 14 | Sports Illustrated 250 | O Nashville Superspeedway | Lebanon, Tennessee | June 5 |
| 15 | MillerTech Battery 250 | O Pocono Raceway | Long Pond, Pennsylvania | June 12 |
| 16 | Cuervo 300 | O Chicagoland Speedway | Joliet, Illinois | June 26 |
| 17 | Hy-Vee PERKS 250 | O Iowa Speedway | Newton, Iowa | July 3 |
| 18 | Pit Boss/FoodMaxx 250 | R Sonoma Raceway | Sonoma, California | July 10 |
| 19 | Pennzoil 250 | O Indianapolis Motor Speedway | Speedway, Indiana | July 24 |
| 20 | United Rentals Driven to Serve 250 | S Coronado Street Course | San Diego, California | July 31 |
| 21 | Food City 300 | O Bristol Motor Speedway | Bristol, Tennessee | August 13 |
| 22 | Nu Way 225 | O World Wide Technology Raceway | Madison, Illinois | August 21 |
| 23 | Winn-Dixie 250 | O Daytona International Speedway | Daytona Beach, Florida | August 27 |
| 24 | Fleetio 200 | O Darlington Raceway | Darlington, South Carolina | September 4 |
The Chase
| 25 | TBA | O Richmond Raceway | Richmond, Virginia | September 10 |
| 26 | Mission 200 at The Glen | R Watkins Glen International | Watkins Glen, New York | September 18 |
| 27 | Kansas Lottery 300 | O Kansas Speedway | Kansas City, Kansas | October 2 |
| 28 | Focused Health 302 | O Las Vegas Motor Speedway | Las Vegas, Nevada | October 9 |
| 29 | Blue Cross NC 300 | O Charlotte Motor Speedway | Concord, North Carolina | October 16 |
| 30 | Timerland PRO 200 | O Phoenix Raceway | Avondale, Arizona | October 23 |
| 31 | TPG 250 | O Talladega Superspeedway | Lincoln, Alabama | October 30 |
| 32 | National Debt Relief 250 | O Martinsville Speedway | Ridgeway, Virginia | November 6 |
| 33 | Hard Rock Bet 300 | O Homestead–Miami Speedway | Homestead, Florida | November 13 |

=== Schedule changes ===
The race at Watkins Glen International will return to "The Chase" after being held in May for one year in 2026. The summer race at EchoPark Speedway was removed. North Wilkesboro Speedway and Richmond Raceway were added for the first time since 1985 and 2024, respectively. The series will not return to Rockingham Speedway for the first time since 2024.

== See also ==
- 2027 NASCAR Cup Series
- 2027 NASCAR Truck Series
- 2027 ARCA Menards Series
- 2027 ARCA Menards Series East
- 2027 ARCA Menards Series West
- 2027 NASCAR Whelen Modified Tour
