= 2022 Production Alliance Group 300 =

Second race of the 2022 NASCAR Xfinity Series

Race details
- Race 2 of 33 in the 2022 NASCAR Xfinity Series
- Date: February 26, 2022
- Official name: 23rd Annual Production Alliance Group 300
- Location: Fontana, California, Auto Club Speedway
- Course: Permanent racing facility
- Course length: 2 miles (3.22 km)
- Distance: 165 laps, 330 mi (530 km)
- Scheduled distance: 150 laps, 300 mi (483 km)
- Average speed: 105.682 mph (170.079 km/h)

Pole position
Driver	A. J. Allmendinger	Kaulig Racing
- Time: 40.038

Most laps led
Driver	Cole Custer	SS-Green Light Racing
- Laps: 80

Winner
No. 07	Cole Custer	SS-Green Light Racing

Television in the United States
- Network: Fox Sports 1
- Announcers: Adam Alexander, Ryan Blaney, Joey Logano

Radio in the United States
- Radio: Motor Racing Network

The 2022 Production Alliance Group 300 was the second stock car race of the 2022 NASCAR Xfinity Series and the 23rd iteration of the event. The race was held on Saturday, February 26, 2022, in Fontana, California at Auto Club Speedway, a 2-mile (3.22 km) permanent oval-shaped speedway. The race was run over 165 laps due to three overtime finishes. Cole Custer of SS-Green Light Racing would win the race after leading the most laps. This was Cole's tenth career win in the Xfinity Series, his first of the season, and the first career win for SS-Green Light Racing. To fill out the podium, Noah Gragson of JR Motorsports and Trevor Bayne of Joe Gibbs Racing would finish second and third, respectively.

== Background ==
Auto Club Speedway (previously California Speedway) was a two-mile (3.2 km), low-banked, D-shaped oval superspeedway in Fontana, California which hosted NASCAR racing annually from 1997 to 2023. It was also used for open wheel racing events. The racetrack was located near the former locations of Ontario Motor Speedway and Riverside International Raceway. The track was owned and operated by International Speedway Corporation and was the only track owned by ISC to have its naming rights sold. The speedway was served by the nearby Interstate 10 and Interstate 15 freeways as well as a Metrolink station located behind the backstretch.

=== Entry list ===
#	Driver	Team	Make
1	Sam Mayer	JR Motorsports	Chevrolet
02	Brett Moffitt	Our Motorsports	Chevrolet
2	Sheldon Creed (R)	Richard Childress Racing	Chevrolet
4	Bayley Currey	JD Motorsports	Chevrolet
5	Matt Mills	B. J. McLeod Motorsports	Chevrolet
6	Ryan Vargas	JD Motorsports	Chevrolet
07	Cole Custer (i)	SS-Green Light Racing	Ford
7	Justin Allgaier	JR Motorsports	Chevrolet
08	Joe Graf Jr.	SS-Green Light Racing	Ford
8	Josh Berry	JR Motorsports	Chevrolet
9	Noah Gragson	JR Motorsports	Chevrolet
10	Landon Cassill	Kaulig Racing	Chevrolet
11	Daniel Hemric	Kaulig Racing	Chevrolet
16	A. J. Allmendinger	Kaulig Racing	Chevrolet
18	Trevor Bayne	Joe Gibbs Racing	Toyota
19	Brandon Jones	Joe Gibbs Racing	Toyota
21	Austin Hill (R)	Richard Childress Racing	Chevrolet
23	Anthony Alfredo	Our Motorsports	Chevrolet
26	Jeffrey Earnhardt	Sam Hunt Racing	Toyota
27	Jeb Burton	Our Motorsprots	Chevrolet
28	Kyle Sieg	RSS Racing	Ford
31	Myatt Snider	Jordan Anderson Racing	Chevrolet
33	Will Rodgers	Reaume Brothers Racing	Toyota
34	Jesse Iwuji (R)	Jesse Iwuji Motorsports	Chevrolet
35	Joey Gase	Emerling-Gase Motorsports	Toyota
36	Alex Labbé	DGM Racing	Chevrolet
38	Timmy Hill* (i)	RSS Racing	Ford
39	Ryan Sieg	RSS Racing	Ford
44	Tommy Joe Martins	Alpha Prime Racing	Chevrolet
45	Kaz Grala (i)	Alpha Prime Racing	Chevrolet
47	Brennan Poole	Mike Harmon Racing	Chevrolet
48	Jade Buford	Big Machine Racing	Chevrolet
51	Jeremy Clements	Jeremy Clements Racing	Chevrolet
52	Harrison Rhodes**	Jimmy Means Racing	Chevrolet
54	Ty Gibbs	Joe Gibbs Racing	Toyota
66	J. J. Yeley	MBM Motorsports	Toyota
68	Brandon Brown	Brandonbilt Motorsports	Chevrolet
78	Josh Williams	B. J. McLeod Motorsports	Chevrolet
90	Dexter Bean**	DGM Racing	Chevrolet
91	Mason Massey	DGM Racing	Chevrolet
92	Kyle Weatherman	DGM Racing	Chevrolet
98	Riley Herbst	Stewart-Haas Racing	Ford
99	Stefan Parsons	B. J. McLeod Motorsports	Chevrolet
Official entry list

*Driver changed to Joe Graf Jr. for the race after Graf failed to qualify.[3]

**Withdrew prior to the event

== Practice ==
The only 30-minute practice session was held on Saturday, February 26, at 9:00 AM PST. Justin Allgaier of JR Motorsports would set the fastest time in the session, with a time 40.353 seconds and a speed of 178.425 mph (287.147 km/h).

Pos.	#	Driver	Team	Make	Time	Speed
1	7	Justin Allgaier	JR Motorsports	Chevrolet	40.353	178.425
2	9	Noah Gragson	JR Motorsports	Chevrolet	40.489	177.826
3	19	Brandon Jones	Joe Gibbs Racing	Toyota	40.526	177.664
Full practice results

== Qualifying ==
Qualifying was held on Saturday, February 26, at 9:30 AM PST. Since Auto Club Speedway is an oval track, the qualifying system used is a single-car, single-lap system with only one round. Whoever sets the fastest time in the round wins the pole.

A. J. Allmendinger scored the pole for the race with a time of 40.038 seconds and a speed of 179.829 mph (289.407 km/h).

Pos.	#	Driver	Team	Make	Time	Speed
1	16	A. J. Allmendinger	Kaulig Racing	Chevrolet	40.038	179.829
2	07	Cole Custer (i)	SS-Green Light Racing	Ford	40.046	179.793
3	19	Brandon Jones	Joe Gibbs Racing	Toyota	40.072	179.677
4	18	Trevor Bayne	Joe Gibbs Racing	Toyota	40.093	179.582
5	11	Daniel Hemric	Kaulig Racing	Chevrolet	40.309	178.620
6	9	Noah Gragson	JR Motorsports	Chevrolet	40.324	178.554
7	10	Landon Cassill	Kaulig Racing	Chevrolet	40.466	177.927
8	21	Austin Hill (R)	Richard Childress Racing	Chevrolet	40.664	177.061
9	2	Sheldon Creed (R)	Richard Childress Racing	Chevrolet	40.665	177.056
10	51	Jeremy Clements	Jeremy Clements Racing	Chevrolet	40.695	176.926
11	8	Josh Berry	JR Motorsports	Chevrolet	40.759	176.648
12	54	Ty Gibbs	Joe Gibbs Racing	Toyota	40.763	176.631
13	1	Sam Mayer	JR Motorsports	Chevrolet	40.779	176.561
14	39	Ryan Sieg	RSS Racing	Ford	40.835	176.319
15	48	Jade Buford	Big Machine Racing	Chevrolet	40.975	175.717
16	98	Riley Herbst	Stewart-Haas Racing	Ford	41.025	175.503
17	02	Brett Moffitt	Our Motorsports	Chevrolet	41.029	175.486
18	38	Timmy Hill (i)	RSS Racing	Ford	41.040	175.439
19	36	Alex Labbé	DGM Racing	Chevrolet	41.092	175.217
20	7	Justin Allgaier	JR Motorsports	Chevrolet	41.104	175.165
21	27	Jeb Burton	Our Motorsports	Chevrolet	41.116	175.114
22	92	Kyle Weatherman	DGM Racing	Chevrolet	41.165	174.906
23	99	Stefan Parsons	B. J. McLeod Motorsports	Chevrolet	41.207	174.728
24	66	J. J. Yeley	MBM Motorsports	Toyota	41.220	174.672
25	5	Matt Mills	B. J. McLeod Motorsports	Chevrolet	41.255	174.524
26	4	Bayley Currey	JD Motorsports	Chevrolet	41.266	174.478
27	44	Tommy Joe Martins	Alpha Prime Racing	Chevrolet	41.310	174.292
28	23	Anthony Alfredo	Our Motorsports	Chevrolet	41.364	174.064
29	45	Kaz Grala (i)	Alpha Prime Racing	Chevrolet	41.565	173.223
30	68	Brandon Brown	Brandonbilt Motorsports	Chevrolet	41.695	172.683
31	31	Myatt Snider	Jordan Anderson Racing	Chevrolet	41.704	172.645
32	6	Ryan Vargas	JD Motorsports	Chevrolet	41.708	172.629
33	91	Mason Massey	DGM Racing	Chevrolet	41.772	172.364
Qualified by owner's points
34	78	Josh Williams	B. J. McLeod Motorsports	Chevrolet	42.023	171.335
35	34	Jesse Iwuji (R)	Jesse Iwuji Motorsports	Chevrolet	43.682	164.828
36	35	Joey Gase	Emerling-Gase Motorsports	Toyota	44.104	163.250
37	26	Jeffrey Earnhardt	Sam Hunt Racing	Toyota	—	—
38	28	Kyle Sieg	RSS Racing	Ford	—	—
Failed to qualify
39	33	Will Rodgers	Reaume Brothers Racing	Toyota	41.880	171.920
40	08	Joe Graf Jr.	SS-Green Light Racing	Ford	41.974	171.535
41	47	Brennan Poole	Mike Harmon Racing	Chevrolet	—	—
Withdrew
WD	52	Harrison Rhodes	Jimmy Means Racing	Chevrolet	—	—
WD	53	TBA	Emerling-Gase Motorsports	Ford	—	—
WD	90	Dexter Bean	DGM Racing	Chevrolet	—	—
Official qualifying results
Official starting lineup

== Race results ==
Stage 1 Laps: 35

Pos.	#	Driver	Team	Make	Pts
1	18	Trevor Bayne	Joe Gibbs Racing	Toyota	10
2	07	Cole Custer (i)	SS-Green Light Racing	Ford	0
3	7	Justin Allgaier	JR Motorsports	Chevrolet	8
4	9	Noah Gragson	JR Motorsports	Chevrolet	7
5	54	Ty Gibbs	Joe Gibbs Racing	Toyota	6
6	16	A. J. Allmendinger	Kaulig Racing	Chevrolet	5
7	8	Josh Berry	JR Motorsports	Chevrolet	4
8	39	Ryan Sieg	RSS Racing	Ford	3
9	11	Daniel Hemric	Kaulig Racing	Chevrolet	2
10	1	Sam Mayer	JR Motorsports	Chevrolet	1

Stage 2 Laps: 35

Pos.	#	Driver	Team	Make	Pts
1	07	Cole Custer (i)	SS-Green Light Racing	Ford	0
2	19	Brandon Jones	Joe Gibbs Racing	Toyota	9
3	7	Justin Allgaier	JR Motorsports	Chevrolet	8
4	9	Noah Gragson	JR Motorsports	Chevrolet	7
5	54	Ty Gibbs	Joe Gibbs Racing	Toyota	6
6	11	Daniel Hemric	Kaulig Racing	Chevrolet	5
7	16	A. J. Allmendinger	Kaulig Racing	Chevrolet	4
8	1	Sam Mayer	JR Motorsports	Chevrolet	3
9	8	Josh Berry	JR Motorsports	Chevrolet	2
10	98	Riley Herbst	Stewart-Haas Racing	Ford	1

Stage 3 Laps: 80*

Fin.	St	#	Driver	Team	Make	Laps	Led	Status	Points
1	2	07	Cole Custer (i)	SS-Green Light Racing	Ford	165	80	Running	0
2	6	9	Noah Gragson	JR Motorsports	Chevrolet	165	25	Running	49
3	4	18	Trevor Bayne	Joe Gibbs Racing	Toyota	165	24	Running	44
4	11	8	Josh Berry	JR Motorsports	Chevrolet	165	0	Running	39
5	28	23	Anthony Alfredo	Our Motorsports	Chevrolet	165	0	Running	32
6	13	1	Sam Mayer	JR Motorsports	Chevrolet	165	0	Running	35
7	1	16	A. J. Allmendinger	Kaulig Racing	Chevrolet	165	13	Running	39
8	20	7	Justin Allgaier	JR Motorsports	Chevrolet	165	7	Running	45
9	16	98	Riley Herbst	Stewart-Haas Racing	Ford	165	0	Running	29
10	14	39	Ryan Sieg	RSS Racing	Ford	165	0	Running	30
11	30	68	Brandon Brown	Brandonbilt Motorsports	Chevrolet	165	0	Running	26
12	5	11	Daniel Hemric	Kaulig Racing	Chevrolet	165	10	Running	32
13	12	54	Ty Gibbs	Joe Gibbs Racing	Toyota	165	3	Running	36
14	21	27	Jeb Burton	Our Motorsports	Chevrolet	165	0	Running	23
15	18	38	Joe Graf Jr.	RSS Racing	Ford	165	0	Running	22
16	22	92	Kyle Weatherman	DGM Racing	Chevrolet	165	0	Running	21
17	10	51	Jeremy Clements	Jeremy Clements Racing	Chevrolet	165	0	Running	20
18	38	28	Kyle Sieg	RSS Racing	Ford	165	0	Running	19
19	17	02	Brett Moffitt	Our Motorsports	Chevrolet	165	0	Running	18
20	36	35	Joey Gase	Emerling-Gase Motorsports	Toyota	165	0	Running	17
21	34	78	Josh Williams	B. J. McLeod Motorsports	Chevrolet	165	0	Running	16
22	24	66	J. J. Yeley	MBM Motorsports	Toyota	165	0	Running	15
23	25	5	Matt Mills	B. J. McLeod Motorsports	Chevrolet	165	0	Running	14
24	19	36	Alex Labbé	DGM Racing	Chevrolet	165	0	Running	13
25	29	45	Kaz Grala (i)	Alpha Prime Racing	Chevrolet	163	0	Running	0
26	31	31	Myatt Snider	Jordan Anderson Racing	Chevrolet	163	0	Running	11
27	8	21	Austin Hill (R)	Richard Childress Racing	Chevrolet	162	0	Running	10
28	33	91	Mason Massey	DGM Racing	Chevrolet	162	0	Running	9
29	37	26	Jeffrey Earnhardt	Sam Hunt Racing	Toyota	161	0	Running	8
30	23	99	Stefan Parsons	B. J. McLeod Motorsports	Chevrolet	159	0	Accident	7
31	27	44	Tommy Joe Martins	Alpha Prime Racing	Chevrolet	158	0	Running	6
32	9	2	Sheldon Creed (R)	Richard Childress Racing	Chevrolet	156	0	Accident	5
33	3	19	Brandon Jones	Joe Gibbs Racing	Toyota	155	3	Accident	13
34	26	4	Bayley Currey	JD Motorsports	Chevrolet	154	0	Running	3
35	32	6	Ryan Vargas	JD Motorsports	Chevrolet	150	0	Accident	2
36	35	34	Jesse Iwuji (R)	Jesse Iwuji Motorsports	Chevrolet	131	0	Running	1
37	15	48	Jade Buford	Big Machine Racing	Chevrolet	123	0	Accident	1
38	7	10	Landon Cassill	Kaulig Racing	Chevrolet	6	0	Engine	1
Official race results

*Race extended to 165 laps due to three overtime finishes.

== Standings after the race ==
Drivers' Championship standings

Pos	Driver	Points
1	A. J. Allmendinger	90
2	Noah Gragson	89 (-1)
3	Justin Allgaier	87 (–3)
4	Riley Herbst	71 (–19)
5	Ryan Sieg	71 (–19)
6	Ty Gibbs	71 (–19)
7	Josh Berry	63 (–27)
8	Anthony Alfredo	62 (–28)
9	Daniel Hemric	61 (–29)
10	Brandon Brown	60 (–30)
11	Austin Hill	57 (–33)
12	Sam Mayer	51 (–39)
Official driver's standings

- Note: Only the first 12 positions are included for the driver standings.

Previous race: 2022 Beef. It's What's for Dinner. 300	NASCAR Xfinity Series; 2022 season	Next race: 2022 Alsco Uniforms 300 (Las Vegas)
