= 2022 Alsco Uniforms 300 (Las Vegas) =

Third race of the 2022 NASCAR Xfinity Series

Race details
- Race 3 of 33 in the 2022 NASCAR Xfinity Series
- Date: March 5, 2022
- Official name: 26th Annual Alsco Uniforms 300
- Location: North Las Vegas, Nevada, Las Vegas Motor Speedway
- Course: Permanent racing facility
- Course length: 1.5 miles (2.41 km)
- Distance: 200 laps, 300 mi (482.893 km)
- Scheduled distance: 200 laps, 300 mi (482.803 km)
- Average speed: 102.128 mph (164.359 km/h)

Pole position
Driver	A. J. Allmendinger	Kaulig Racing
- Time: 29.318

Most laps led
Driver	Justin Allgaier	JR Motorsports
- Laps: 62

Winner
No. 54	Ty Gibbs	Joe Gibbs Racing

Television in the United States
- Network: Fox Sports 1
- Announcers: Adam Alexander, Ryan Blaney, Joey Logano

Radio in the United States
- Radio: Performance Racing Network

The 2022 Alsco Uniforms 300 was the third stock car race of the 2022 NASCAR Xfinity Series and the 26th iteration of the event. The race was held on Saturday, March 5, 2022, in North Las Vegas, Nevada at Las Vegas Motor Speedway, a 1.5 miles (2.4 km) permanent D-shaped oval racetrack. The race was run over 200 laps. Ty Gibbs of Joe Gibbs Racing would win the race after taking the lead on the final restart. This was Gibbs' fifth career Xfinity Series win, and his first of the season. To fill out the podium, Noah Gragson of JR Motorsports and Daniel Hemric of Kaulig Racing would finish second and third, respectively.

== Background ==
Las Vegas Motor Speedway, located in Clark County, Nevada outside the Las Vegas city limits and about 15 miles northeast of the Las Vegas Strip, is a 1,200-acre (490 ha) complex of multiple tracks for motorsports racing. The complex is owned by Speedway Motorsports, Inc., which is headquartered in Charlotte, North Carolina.

=== Entry list ===
#	Driver	Team	Make
1	Sam Mayer	JR Motorsports	Chevrolet
02	Brett Moffitt	Our Motorsports	Chevrolet
2	Sheldon Creed (R)	Richard Childress Racing	Chevrolet
4	Bayley Currey	JD Motorsports	Chevrolet
5	Matt Mills	B. J. McLeod Motorsports	Chevrolet
6	Ryan Vargas	JD Motorsports	Chevrolet
07	Joe Graf Jr.	SS-Green Light Racing	Ford
7	Justin Allgaier	JR Motorsports	Chevrolet
08	David Starr	SS-Green Light Racing	Ford
8	Josh Berry	JR Motorsports	Chevrolet
9	Noah Gragson	JR Motorsports	Chevrolet
10	Landon Cassill	Kaulig Racing	Chevrolet
11	Daniel Hemric	Kaulig Racing	Chevrolet
13	Stan Mullis	MBM Motorsports	Toyota
16	A. J. Allmendinger	Kaulig Racing	Chevrolet
18	Ryan Truex	Joe Gibbs Racing	Toyota
19	Brandon Jones	Joe Gibbs Racing	Toyota
21	Austin Hill (R)	Richard Childress Racing	Chevrolet
23	Anthony Alfredo	Our Motorsports	Chevrolet
26	John Hunter Nemechek (i)	Sam Hunt Racing	Toyota
27	Jeb Burton	Our Motorsports	Chevrolet
28	C. J. McLaughlin	RSS Racing	Ford
31	Myatt Snider	Jordan Anderson Racing	Chevrolet
33	Will Rodgers**	Reaume Brothers Racing	Toyota
34	Jesse Iwuji (R)	Jesse Iwuji Motorsports	Chevrolet
35	Joey Gase	Emerling-Gase Motorsports	Toyota
36	Alex Labbé	DGM Racing	Chevrolet
38	Kyle Sieg	RSS Racing	Ford
39	Ryan Sieg	RSS Racing	Ford
44	Ryan Ellis	Alpha Prime Racing	Chevrolet
45	Kaz Grala (i)	Alpha Prime Racing	Chevrolet
47	Brennan Poole	Mike Harmon Racing	Chevrolet
48	Jade Buford	Big Machine Racing	Chevrolet
51	Jeremy Clements	Jeremy Clements Racing	Chevrolet
54	Ty Gibbs	Joe Gibbs Racing	Toyota
66	J. J. Yeley	MBM Motorsports	Ford
68	Brandon Brown	Brandonbilt Motorsports	Chevrolet
78	Josh Williams	B. J. McLeod Motorsports	Chevrolet
91	Mason Massey	DGM Racing	Chevrolet
92	Kyle Weatherman	DGM Racing	Chevrolet
98	Riley Herbst	Stewart-Haas Racing	Ford
99	Stefan Parsons	B. J. McLeod Motorsports	Chevrolet
Official entry list

**Withdrew prior to the event.

== Practice ==
The only 30-minute practice session is scheduled to be held on Friday, March 4, at 3:30 PM PST. Noah Gragson of JR Motorsports would set the fastest time in the session, with a time of 30.226 seconds and a speed of 178.654 mph (287.516 km/h).

Pos.	#	Driver	Team	Make	Time	Speed
1	9	Noah Gragson	JR Motorsports	Chevrolet	30.226	178.654
2	1	Sam Mayer	JR Motorsports	Chevrolet	30.267	178.412
3	18	Ryan Truex	Joe Gibbs Racing	Toyota	30.404	177.608
Full practice results

== Qualifying ==
Qualifying was held on Friday, March 4, at 4:00 PM PST. Since Las Vegas Motor Speedway is an oval track, the qualifying system used is a single-car, single-lap system with only one round. Whoever sets the fastest time in the round wins the pole.

A. J. Allmendinger scored the pole for the race with a time of 29.318 seconds and a speed of 184.187 mph (296.420 km/h).

=== Full qualifying results ===
Pos.	#	Driver	Team	Make	Time	Speed
1	16	A. J. Allmendinger	Kaulig Racing	Chevrolet	29.318	184.187
2	8	Josh Berry	JR Motorsports	Chevrolet	29.508	183.001
3	98	Riley Herbst	Stewart-Haas Racing	Ford	29.550	182.741
4	9	Noah Gragson	JR Motorsports	Chevrolet	29.619	182.315
5	10	Landon Cassill	Kaulig Racing	Chevrolet	29.645	182.156
6	11	Daniel Hemric	Kaulig Racing	Chevrolet	29.648	182.137
7	18	Ryan Truex	Joe Gibbs Racing	Toyota	29.726	181.659
8	2	Sheldon Creed (R)	Richard Childress Racing	Chevrolet	29.769	181.397
9	1	Sam Mayer	JR Motorsports	Chevrolet	29.891	180.656
10	26	John Hunter Nemechek (i)	Sam Hunt Racing	Toyota	29.901	180.596
11	54	Ty Gibbs	Joe Gibbs Racing	Toyota	30.016	179.904
12	51	Jeremy Clements	Jeremy Clements Racing	Chevrolet	30.022	179.868
13	02	Brett Moffitt	Our Motorsports	Chevrolet	30.144	179.140
14	48	Jade Buford	Big Machine Racing	Chevrolet	30.181	178.921
15	21	Austin Hill (R)	Richard Childress Racing	Chevrolet	30.233	178.613
16	7	Justin Allgaier	JR Motorsports	Chevrolet	30.281	178.330
17	36	Alex Labbé	DGM Racing	Chevrolet	30.298	178.230
18	68	Brandon Brown	Brandonbilt Motorsports	Chevrolet	30.305	178.188
19	5	Matt Mills	B. J. McLeod Motorsports	Chevrolet	30.326	178.065
20	39	Ryan Sieg	RSS Racing	Ford	30.334	178.018
21	19	Brandon Jones	Joe Gibbs Racing	Toyota	30.393	177.672
22	45	Kaz Grala (i)	Alpha Prime Racing	Chevrolet	30.420	177.515
23	07	Joe Graf Jr.	SS-Green Light Racing	Ford	30.420	177.515
24	38	Kyle Sieg	RSS Racing	Ford	30.518	176.945
25	23	Anthony Alfredo	Our Motorsports	Chevrolet	30.528	176.887
26	92	Kyle Weatherman	DGM Racing	Chevrolet	30.550	176.759
27	4	Bayley Currey	JD Motorsports	Chevrolet	30.583	176.569
28	6	Ryan Vargas	JD Motorsports	Chevrolet	30.628	176.309
29	99	Stefan Parsons	B. J. McLeod Motorsports	Chevrolet	30.658	176.137
30	66	J. J. Yeley	MBM Motorsports	Ford	30.720	175.781
31	28	C. J. McLaughlin	RSS Racing	Ford	30.754	175.587
32	91	Mason Massey	DGM Racing	Chevrolet	30.755	175.581
33	47	Brennan Poole	Mike Harmon Racing	Chevrolet	30.901	174.752
Qualified by owner's points
34	31	Myatt Snider	Jordan Anderson Racing	Chevrolet	31.036	173.991
35	44	Ryan Ellis	Alpha Prime Racing	Chevrolet	31.336	172.326
36	35	Joey Gase	Emerling-Gase Motorsports	Toyota	31.921	169.168
37	34	Jesse Iwuji (R)	Jesse Iwuji Motorsports	Chevrolet	36.596	147.557
38	27	Jeb Burton	Our Motorsports	Chevrolet	—	—
Failed to qualify
39	08	David Starr	SS-Green Light Racing	Ford	31.418	171.876
40	13	Stan Mullis	MBM Motorsports	Toyota	32.849	164.389
41	78	Josh Williams	B. J. McLeod Motorsports	Chevrolet	—	—
Withdrew
42	33	Will Rodgers	Reaume Brothers Racing	Toyota	—	—
Official qualifying results
Official starting lineup

== Race results ==
Stage 1 Laps: 45

Pos.	#	Driver	Team	Make	Pts
1	9	Noah Gragson	JR Motorsports	Chevrolet	10
2	1	Sam Mayer	JR Motorsports	Chevrolet	9
3	8	Josh Berry	JR Motorsports	Chevrolet	8
4	54	Ty Gibbs	Joe Gibbs Racing	Toyota	7
5	18	Ryan Truex	Joe Gibbs Racing	Toyota	6
6	16	A. J. Allmendinger	Kaulig Racing	Chevrolet	5
7	21	Austin Hill (R)	Richard Childress Racing	Chevrolet	4
8	19	Brandon Jones	Joe Gibbs Racing	Toyota	3
9	11	Daniel Hemric	Kaulig Racing	Chevrolet	2
10	26	John Hunter Nemechek (i)	Sam Hunt Racing	Toyota	0

Stage 2 Laps: 45

Pos.	#	Driver	Team	Make	Pts
1	9	Noah Gragson	JR Motorsports	Chevrolet	10
2	54	Ty Gibbs	Joe Gibbs Racing	Toyota	9
3	1	Sam Mayer	JR Motorsports	Chevrolet	8
4	21	Austin Hill (R)	Richard Childress Racing	Chevrolet	7
5	11	Daniel Hemric	Kaulig Racing	Chevrolet	6
6	19	Brandon Jones	Joe Gibbs Racing	Toyota	5
7	8	Josh Berry	JR Motorsports	Chevrolet	4
8	26	John Hunter Nemechek (i)	Sam Hunt Racing	Toyota	0
9	18	Ryan Truex	Joe Gibbs Racing	Toyota	2
10	7	Justin Allgaier	JR Motorsports	Chevrolet	1

Stage 3 Laps: 110

Fin.	St	#	Driver	Team	Make	Laps	Led	Status	Points
1	11	54	Ty Gibbs	Joe Gibbs Racing	Toyota	200	6	Running	56
2	4	9	Noah Gragson	JR Motorsports	Chevrolet	200	52	Running	55
3	6	11	Daniel Hemric	Kaulig Racing	Chevrolet	200	0	Running	42
4	2	8	Josh Berry	JR Motorsports	Chevrolet	200	0	Running	45
5	16	7	Justin Allgaier	JR Motorsports	Chevrolet	200	62	Running	33
6	5	10	Landon Cassill	Kaulig Racing	Chevrolet	200	0	Running	31
7	8	2	Sheldon Creed (R)	Richard Childress Racing	Chevrolet	200	5	Running	30
8	13	02	Brett Moffitt	Our Motorsports	Chevrolet	200	0	Running	29
9	1	16	A. J. Allmendinger	Kaulig Racing	Chevrolet	200	32	Running	33
10	21	19	Brandon Jones	Joe Gibbs Racing	Toyota	200	2	Running	35
11	12	51	Jeremy Clements	Jeremy Clements Racing	Chevrolet	200	0	Running	26
12	10	26	John Hunter Nemechek (i)	Sam Hunt Racing	Toyota	200	0	Running	0
13	35	44	Ryan Ellis	Alpha Prime Racing	Chevrolet	200	0	Running	24
14	3	98	Riley Herbst	Stewart-Haas Racing	Ford	200	0	Running	23
15	17	36	Alex Labbé	DGM Racing	Chevrolet	199	0	Running	22
16	24	38	Kyle Sieg	RSS Racing	Ford	199	0	Running	21
17	25	23	Anthony Alfredo	Our Motorsports	Chevrolet	199	0	Running	20
18	27	4	Bayley Currey	JD Motorsports	Chevrolet	199	0	Running	19
19	38	27	Jeb Burton	Our Motorsports	Chevrolet	198	0	Running	18
20	30	66	J. J. Yeley	MBM Motorsports	Ford	198	0	Running	17
21	34	31	Myatt Snider	Jordan Anderson Racing	Chevrolet	198	0	Running	16
22	36	35	Joey Gase	Emerling-Gase Motorsports	Toyota	198	0	Running	15
23	23	45	Kaz Grala (i)	Alpha Prime Racing	Chevrolet	198	0	Running	0
24	31	28	C. J. McLaughlin	RSS Racing	Ford	198	0	Running	13
25	9	1	Sam Mayer	JR Motorsports	Chevrolet	198	25	Running	29
26	26	92	Kyle Weatherman	DGM Racing	Chevrolet	196	0	Running	11
27	32	91	Mason Massey	DGM Racing	Chevrolet	195	0	Running	10
28	14	48	Jade Buford	Big Machine Racing	Chevrolet	195	0	Running	9
29	18	68	Brandon Brown	Brandonbilt Motorsports	Chevrolet	193	3	Running	7
30	7	18	Ryan Truex	Joe Gibbs Racing	Toyota	190	0	Accident	14
31	15	21	Austin Hill (R)	Richard Childress Racing	Chevrolet	188	13	Accident	16
32	28	6	Ryan Vargas	JD Motorsports	Chevrolet	168	0	Accident	4
33	29	99	Stefan Parsons	B. J. McLeod Motorsports	Chevrolet	168	0	Accident	3
34	37	34	Jesse Iwuji (R)	Jesse Iwuji Motorsports	Chevrolet	156	0	Accident	2
35	19	5	Matt Mills	B. J. McLeod Motorsports	Chevrolet	83	0	Accident	1
36	20	39	Ryan Sieg	RSS Racing	Ford	25	0	Accident	1
37	33	47	Brennan Poole	Mike Harmon Racing	Chevrolet	3	0	Engine	1
38	22	07	Joe Graf Jr.	SS-Green Light Racing	Ford	194	0	Disqualified	1
Official race results

== Standings after the race ==
Drivers' Championship standings

Pos	Driver	Points
1	Noah Gragson	144
2	Ty Gibbs	127 (-17)
3	A. J. Allmendinger	123 (–21)
4	Justin Allgaier	120 (–24)
5	Josh Berry	108 (–36)
6	Daniel Hemric	103 (–41)
7	Riley Herbst	94 (–50)
8	Anthony Alfredo	82 (–62)
9	Sam Mayer	80 (–64)
10	Austin Hill	74 (–70)
11	Ryan Sieg	72 (–72)
12	Brandon Jones	70 (–74)
Official driver's standings

- Note: Only the first 12 positions are included for the driver standings.

Previous race: 2022 Production Alliance Group 300	NASCAR Xfinity Series; 2022 season	Next race: 2022 United Rentals 200
