= 2022 United Rentals 200 =

Fourth race of the 2022 NASCAR Xfinity Series

Race details
- Race 4 of 33 in the 2022 NASCAR Xfinity Series
- Date: March 12, 2022
- Official name: 18th Annual United Rentals 200
- Location: Avondale, Arizona, Phoenix Raceway
- Course: Permanent racing facility
- Course length: 1.0 miles (1.6 km)
- Distance: 200 laps, 200 mi (320 km)
- Scheduled distance: 200 laps, 200 mi (320 km)
- Average speed: 98.698 mph (158.839 km/h)

Pole position
Driver	Trevor Bayne	Joe Gibbs Racing
- Time: 26.306

Most laps led
Driver	Noah Gragson	JR Motorsports
- Laps: 114

Winner
No. 9	Noah Gragson	JR Motorsports

Television in the United States
- Network: Fox Sports 1
- Announcers: Adam Alexander, Daniel Suárez, Joey Logano

Radio in the United States
- Radio: Motor Racing Network

The 2022 United Rentals 200 was the fourth stock car race of the 2022 NASCAR Xfinity Series and the 18th iteration of the event. The race was held on Saturday, March 12, 2022, in Avondale, Arizona at Phoenix Raceway, a 1.0 mile (1.6 km) permanent tri-oval racetrack. The race was run over 200 laps. Noah Gragson of JR Motorsports would dominate, leading 114 laps, and winning the race. This was Gragson's sixth career win in the Xfinity Series, and his first of the season. To fill out the podium, Brandon Jones of Joe Gibbs Racing and Josh Berry of JR Motorsports would finish 2nd and 3rd, respectively.

== Background ==
Phoenix Raceway is a 1-mile, low-banked tri-oval race track located in Avondale, Arizona, near Phoenix. The motorsport track opened in 1964 and currently hosts two NASCAR race weekends annually. Phoenix Raceway has also hosted the CART, IndyCar Series, USAC and the WeatherTech SportsCar Championship. The raceway is currently owned and operated by NASCAR.

=== Entry list ===
#	Driver	Team	Make
1	Sam Mayer	JR Motorsports	Chevrolet
02	Brett Moffitt	Our Motorsports	Chevrolet
2	Sheldon Creed (R)	Richard Childress Racing	Chevrolet
4	Bayley Currey	JD Motorsports	Chevrolet
5	Nick Sanchez	B. J. McLeod Motorsports	Chevrolet
6	Ryan Vargas	JD Motorsports	Chevrolet
07	Joe Graf Jr.	SS-Green Light Racing	Ford
7	Justin Allgaier	JR Motorsports	Chevrolet
08	David Starr	SS-Green Light Racing	Ford
8	Josh Berry	JR Motorsports	Chevrolet
9	Noah Gragson	JR Motorsports	Chevrolet
10	Landon Cassill	Kaulig Racing	Chevrolet
11	Daniel Hemric	Kaulig Racing	Chevrolet
13	Stan Mullis	MBM Motorsports	Toyota
16	A. J. Allmendinger	Kaulig Racing	Chevrolet
18	Trevor Bayne	Joe Gibbs Racing	Toyota
19	Brandon Jones	Joe Gibbs Racing	Toyota
21	Austin Hill (R)	Richard Childress Racing	Chevrolet
23	Anthony Alfredo	Our Motorsports	Chevrolet
26	John Hunter Nemechek (i)	Sam Hunt Racing	Toyota
27	Jeb Burton	Our Motorsports	Chevrolet
28	Kyle Sieg	RSS Racing	Ford
31	Myatt Snider	Jordan Anderson Racing	Chevrolet
33	Loris Hezemans (i)	Reaume Brothers Racing	Toyota
34	Jesse Little (i)	Jesse Iwuji Motorsports	Chevrolet
35	Jeffrey Earnhardt	Emerling-Gase Motorsports	Toyota
36	Alex Labbé	DGM Racing	Chevrolet
38	Parker Retzlaff	RSS Racing	Ford
39	Ryan Sieg	RSS Racing	Ford
44	Ryan Ellis	Alpha Prime Racing	Chevrolet
45	Kaz Grala (i)	Alpha Prime Racing	Chevrolet
47	Brennan Poole	Mike Harmon Racing	Chevrolet
48	Jade Buford	Big Machine Racing	Chevrolet
51	Jeremy Clements	Jeremy Clements Racing	Chevrolet
54	Ty Gibbs	Joe Gibbs Racing	Toyota
66	J. J. Yeley	MBM Motorsports	Ford
68	Brandon Brown	Brandonbilt Motorsports	Chevrolet
78	Josh Williams	B. J. McLeod Motorsports	Chevrolet
91	Mason Massey	DGM Racing	Chevrolet
92	Kyle Weatherman	DGM Racing	Chevrolet
98	Riley Herbst	Stewart-Haas Racing	Ford
99	Stefan Parsons	B. J. McLeod Motorsports	Chevrolet
Official entry list

== Practice ==
The only 30-minute practice session was held on Saturday, March 12, at 9:30 AM MST. Ty Gibbs of Joe Gibbs Racing would set the fastest time in the session, with a time of 27.607 seconds and a speed of 130.402 mph (209.862 km/h).

Pos.	#	Driver	Team	Make	Time	Speed
1	54	Ty Gibbs	Joe Gibbs Racing	Toyota	27.609	130.402
2	1	Sam Mayer	JR Motorsports	Chevrolet	27.613	130.373
3	18	Trevor Bayne	Joe Gibbs Racing	Toyota	27.685	130.034
Full practice results

== Qualifying ==
Qualifying was held on Saturday, March 12, at 10:00 AM MST. Since Phoenix Raceway is a tri-oval track, the qualifying system used is a single-car, single-lap system with only one round. Whoever sets the fastest time in the round wins the pole.

Trevor Bayne of Joe Gibbs Racing scored the pole for the race with a time of 27.306 seconds and a speed of 131.839 mph (212.174 km/h).

=== Full qualifying results ===
Pos.	#	Driver	Team	Make	Time	Speed
1	18	Trevor Bayne	Joe Gibbs Racing	Toyota	27.306	131.839
2	9	Noah Gragson	JR Motorsports	Chevrolet	27.363	131.565
3	54	Ty Gibbs	Joe Gibbs Racing	Toyota	27.427	131.258
4	39	Ryan Sieg	RSS Racing	Ford	27.451	131.143
5	19	Brandon Jones	Joe Gibbs Racing	Toyota	27.481	131.000
6	38	Parker Retzlaff	RSS Racing	Ford	27.631	130.288
7	1	Sam Mayer	JR Motorsports	Chevrolet	27.648	130.208
8	8	Josh Berry	JR Motorsports	Chevrolet	27.656	130.171
9	2	Sheldon Creed (R)	Richard Childress Racing	Chevrolet	27.661	130.147
10	92	Kyle Weatherman	DGM Racing	Chevrolet	27.697	129.978
11	26	John Hunter Nemechek (i)	Sam Hunt Racing	Toyota	27.727	129.837
12	21	Austin Hill (R)	Richard Childress Racing	Chevrolet	27.736	129.795
13	4	Bayley Currey	JD Motorsports	Chevrolet	27.744	129.758
14	51	Jeremy Clements	Jeremy Clements Racing	Chevrolet	27.781	129.585
15	11	Daniel Hemric	Kaulig Racing	Chevrolet	27.782	129.580
16	27	Jeb Burton	Our Motorsports	Chevrolet	27.804	129.478
17	16	A. J. Allmendinger	Kaulig Racing	Chevrolet	27.816	129.422
18	02	Brett Moffitt	Our Motorsports	Chevrolet	27.817	129.417
19	99	Stefan Parsons	B. J. McLeod Motorsports	Chevrolet	27.825	129.380
20	28	Kyle Sieg	RSS Racing	Ford	27.847	129.278
21	98	Riley Herbst	Stewart-Haas Racing	Ford	27.869	129.176
22	10	Landon Cassill	Kaulig Racing	Chevrolet	27.871	129.167
23	36	Alex Labbé	DGM Racing	Chevrolet	27.873	129.157
24	7	Justin Allgaier	JR Motorsports	Chevrolet	27.884	129.106
25	31	Myatt Snider	Jordan Anderson Racing	Chevrolet	27.915	128.963
26	68	Brandon Brown	Brandonbilt Motorsports	Chevrolet	28.028	128.443
27	45	Kaz Grala (i)	Alpha Prime Racing	Chevrolet	28.226	127.542
28	5	Nick Sanchez	B. J. McLeod Motorsports	Chevrolet	28.332	127.065
29	08	David Starr	SS-Green Light Racing	Ford	28.337	127.042
30	78	Josh Williams	B. J. McLeod Motorsports	Chevrolet	28.357	126.953
31	91	Mason Massey	DGM Racing	Chevrolet	28.383	126.836
32	66	J. J. Yeley	MBM Motorsports	Ford	28.392	126.796
33	48	Jade Buford	Big Machine Racing	Chevrolet	28.477	126.418
Qualified by owner's points
34	35	Jeffrey Earnhardt	Emerling-Gase Motorsports	Toyota	28.506	126.289
35	44	Ryan Ellis	Alpha Prime Racing	Chevrolet	28.660	125.611
36	07	Joe Graf Jr.	SS-Green Light Racing	Ford	28.970	124.266
37	23	Anthony Alfredo	Our Motorsports	Chevrolet	—	—
38	6	Ryan Vargas	JD Motorsports	Chevrolet	—	—
Failed to qualify
39	34	Jesse Little (i)	Jesse Iwuji Motorsports	Chevrolet	28.690	125.479
40	33	Loris Hezemans (i)	Reaume Brothers Racing	Toyota	29.051	123.920
41	13	Stan Mullis	MBM Motorsports	Toyota	29.770	120.927
42	47	Brennan Poole	Mike Harmon Racing	Chevrolet	—	—
Official qualifying results
Official starting lineup

== Race results ==
Stage 1 Laps: 45

Pos.	#	Driver	Team	Make	Pts
1	18	Trevor Bayne	Joe Gibbs Racing	Toyota	10
2	9	Noah Gragson	JR Motorsports	Chevrolet	9
3	19	Brandon Jones	Joe Gibbs Racing	Toyota	8
4	26	John Hunter Nemechek (i)	Sam Hunt Racing	Toyota	0
5	54	Ty Gibbs	Joe Gibbs Racing	Toyota	6
6	7	Justin Allgaier	JR Motorsports	Chevrolet	5
7	10	Landon Cassill	Kaulig Racing	Chevrolet	4
8	16	A. J. Allmendinger	Kaulig Racing	Chevrolet	3
9	8	Josh Berry	JR Motorsports	Chevrolet	2
10	1	Sam Mayer	JR Motorsports	Chevrolet	1

Stage 2 Laps: 45

Pos.	#	Driver	Team	Make	Pts
1	9	Noah Gragson	JR Motorsports	Chevrolet	10
2	7	Justin Allgaier	JR Motorsports	Chevrolet	9
3	19	Brandon Jones	Joe Gibbs Racing	Toyota	8
4	18	Trevor Bayne	Joe Gibbs Racing	Toyota	7
5	8	Josh Berry	JR Motorsports	Chevrolet	6
6	26	John Hunter Nemechek (i)	Sam Hunt Racing	Toyota	0
7	16	A. J. Allmendinger	Kaulig Racing	Chevrolet	4
8	11	Daniel Hemric	Kaulig Racing	Chevrolet	3
9	10	Landon Cassill	Kaulig Racing	Chevrolet	2
10	1	Sam Mayer	JR Motorsports	Chevrolet	1

Stage 3 Laps: 110

Fin.	St	#	Driver	Team	Make	Laps	Led	Status	Points
1	2	9	Noah Gragson	JR Motorsports	Chevrolet	200	114	Running	59
2	5	19	Brandon Jones	Joe Gibbs Racing	Toyota	200	30	Running	51
3	8	8	Josh Berry	JR Motorsports	Chevrolet	200	0	Running	42
4	1	18	Trevor Bayne	Joe Gibbs Racing	Toyota	200	38	Running	50
5	11	26	John Hunter Nemechek (i)	Sam Hunt Racing	Toyota	200	11	Running	0
6	3	54	Ty Gibbs	Joe Gibbs Racing	Toyota	200	0	Running	37
7	17	16	A. J. Allmendinger	Kaulig Racing	Chevrolet	200	0	Running	37
8	15	11	Daniel Hemric	Kaulig Racing	Chevrolet	200	0	Running	32
9	22	10	Landon Cassill	Kaulig Racing	Chevrolet	200	0	Running	34
10	24	7	Justin Allgaier	JR Motorsports	Chevrolet	200	5	Running	41
11	4	39	Ryan Sieg	RSS Racing	Ford	199	2	Running	26
12	16	27	Jeb Burton	Our Motorsports	Chevrolet	199	0	Running	25
13	26	68	Brandon Brown	Brandonbilt Motorsports	Chevrolet	199	0	Running	24
14	9	2	Sheldon Creed (R)	Richard Childress Racing	Chevrolet	199	0	Running	23
15	18	02	Brett Moffitt	Our Motorsports	Chevrolet	199	0	Running	22
16	35	44	Ryan Ellis	Alpha Prime Racing	Chevrolet	199	0	Running	21
17	12	21	Austin Hill (R)	Richard Childress Racing	Chevrolet	199	0	Running	20
18	14	51	Jeremy Clements	Jeremy Clements Racing	Chevrolet	199	0	Running	19
19	23	36	Alex Labbé	DGM Racing	Chevrolet	199	0	Running	18
20	13	4	Bayley Currey	JD Motorsports	Chevrolet	199	0	Running	17
21	19	99	Stefan Parsons	B. J. McLeod Motorsports	Chevrolet	198	0	Running	16
22	7	1	Sam Mayer	JR Motorsports	Chevrolet	198	0	Running	17
23	31	91	Mason Massey	DGM Racing	Chevrolet	198	0	Running	14
24	25	31	Myatt Snider	Jordan Anderson Racing	Chevrolet	198	0	Running	13
25	32	66	J. J. Yeley	MBM Motorsports	Ford	198	0	Running	12
26	28	5	Nick Sanchez	B. J. McLeod Motorsports	Chevrolet	198	0	Running	11
27	36	07	Joe Graf Jr.	SS-Green Light Racing	Ford	197	0	Running	10
28	33	48	Jade Buford	Big Machine Racing	Chevrolet	197	0	Running	9
29	38	6	Ryan Vargas	JD Motorsports	Chevrolet	197	0	Running	8
30	10	92	Kyle Weatherman	DGM Racing	Chevrolet	197	0	Running	7
31	29	08	David Starr	SS-Green Light Racing	Ford	196	0	Running	6
32	20	28	Kyle Sieg	RSS Racing	Ford	196	0	Running	5
33	27	45	Kaz Grala (i)	Alpha Prime Racing	Chevrolet	196	0	Running	0
34	34	35	Jeffrey Earnhardt	Emerling-Gase Motorsports	Toyota	196	0	Running	3
35	30	78	Josh Williams	B. J. McLeod Motorsports	Chevrolet	178	0	Ignition	2
36	6	38	Parker Retzlaff	RSS Racing	Ford	158	0	Fuel Pump	1
37	37	23	Anthony Alfredo	Our Motorsports	Chevrolet	147	0	Running	1
38	21	98	Riley Herbst	Stewart-Haas Racing	Ford	20	0	Accident	1
Official race results

== Standings after the race ==
Drivers' Championship standings

Pos	Driver	Points
1	Noah Gragson	203
2	Ty Gibbs	164 (-39)
3	Justin Allgaier	161 (–42)
4	A. J. Allmendinger	160 (–43)
5	Josh Berry	150 (–53)
6	Daniel Hemric	135 (–68)
7	Brandon Jones	121 (–82)
8	Ryan Sieg	98 (–105)
9	Sam Mayer	97 (–106)
10	Riley Herbst	95 (–108)
11	Austin Hill	94 (–109)
12	Trevor Bayne	94 (–109)
Official driver's standings

- Note: Only the first 12 positions are included for the driver standings.

Previous race: 2022 Alsco Uniforms 300 (Las Vegas)	NASCAR Xfinity Series; 2022 season	Next race: 2022 Nalley Cars 250
