= Brandonbilt Motorsports =

American stock car racing team

- Owner: Jerry Brown
- Base: Fredericksburg, Virginia
- Series: NASCAR Xfinity Series
- Race drivers: Brandon Brown; Austin Dillon; Kris Wright
- Manufacturer: Chevrolet
- Opened: 2014
- Closed: 2022

Career
- Debut: Xfinity Series: 2016 Virginia 529 College Savings 250 (Richmond); Truck Series: 2014 American Ethanol 200 (Iowa)
- Latest race: Xfinity Series: 2022 NASCAR Xfinity Series Championship Race (Phoenix); Truck Series: 2017 Texas Roadhouse 200 (Martinsville)
- Races competed: Total: 166; Xfinity Series: 143; Camping World Truck Series: 23
- Drivers' Championships: Total: 0 Xfinity Series: 0 Camping World Truck Series: 0
- Race victories: Total: 1 Xfinity Series: 1 Camping World Truck Series: 0
- Pole positions: Total: 0 Xfinity Series: 0 Camping World Truck Series: 0

Brandonbilt Motorsports was an American professional stock car racing team that competed in the NASCAR Xfinity Series. The team was owned by Jerry Brown, who is Southern National Motorsports Park's co-owner. The team fielded the No. 68 Chevrolet Camaro SS full-time for Brandon Brown, Austin Dillon, and Kris Wright.

== Xfinity Series ==
=== Car No. 68 history ===
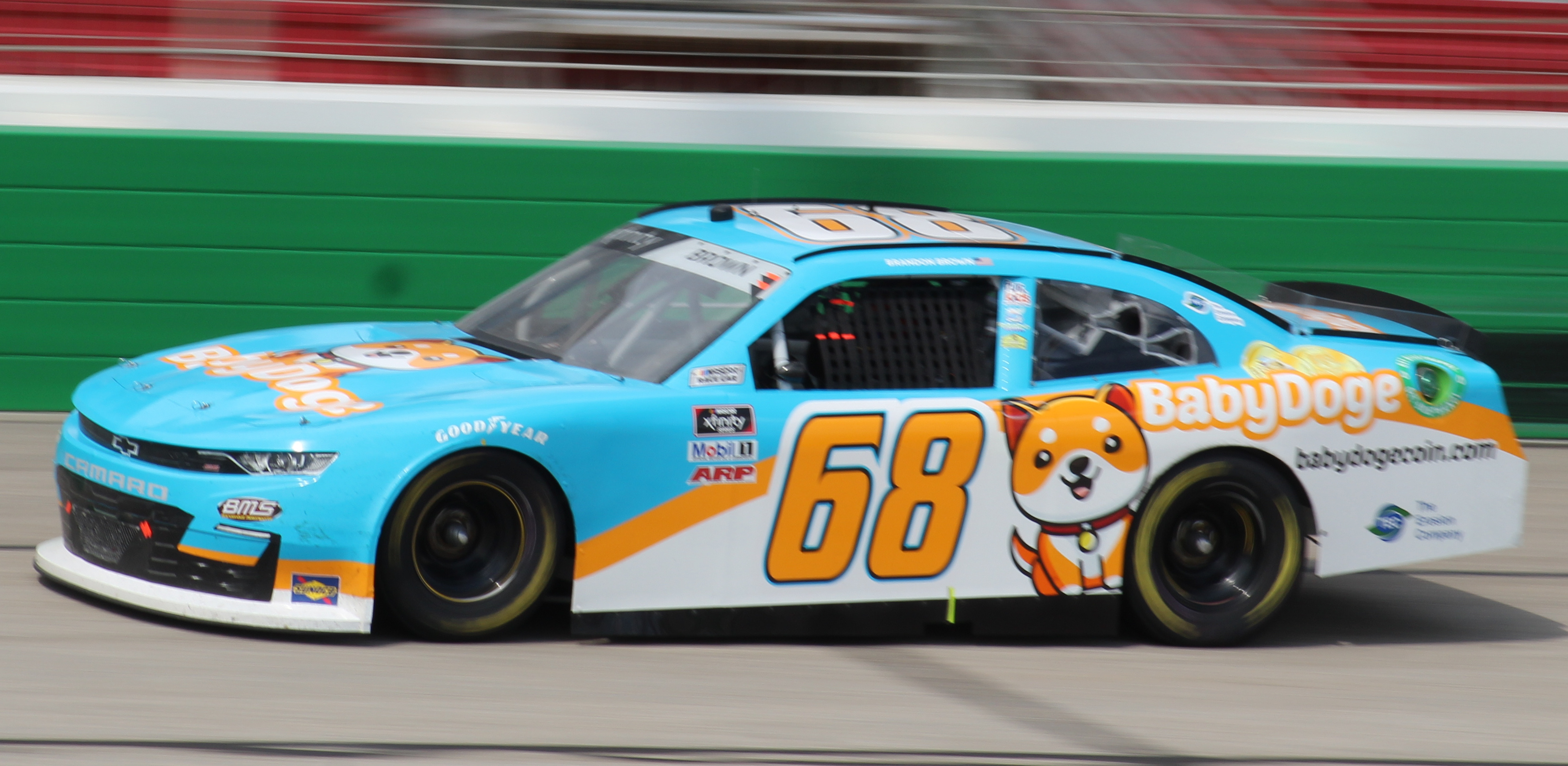
Brandon Brown driving the No. 68 at Atlanta Motor Speedway in 2021

On May 20, 2019, the team announced that it would expand to two cars for the Alsco 300 that weekend at Charlotte Motor Speedway. Brandon Brown was announced as driver, and Vero was announced as sponsor. Jeff Stankiewicz was later confirmed as crew chief.

Before the 2020 season, Brown moved full-time to the No. 68, and picked up industry insider Doug Randolph as crew chief.

During the 2021 season, Brown scored a career-best finish of third at Phoenix in March, followed by a fourth-place finish at Charlotte in May. This was bested by his first career win in October at Talladega.

On December 30, 2021, it was announced that LGBcoin.io will serve as his full-time sponsor throughout the 2022 season. On January 5, 2022, Bob Pockrass of Fox Sports reported that NASCAR rejected the sponsorship. Due to sponsorship issues the team announced that Austin Dillon would replace Brown at Indy RC with sponsorship from Maestro's.

The team closed after the 2022 season due to a lack of sponsorship.

==== Car No. 68 results ====
Year	Driver	No.	Make	1	2	3	4	5	6	7	8	9	10	11	12	13	14	15	16	17	18	19	20	21	22	23	24	25	26	27	28	29	30	31	32	33	NXSC	Pts
2019	Brandon Brown	68	Chevy	DAY	ATL	LVS	PHO	CAL	TEX	BRI	RCH	TAL	DOV	CLT; 20	POC	MCH	IOW	CHI	DAY	KEN				MOH; 24							CLT; 17	DOV	KAN	TEX	PHO	HOM; 13	40th	84
2019	Dillon Bassett	68	Chevy																		NHA; DNQ																40th	84
2019	Will Rodgers	68	Chevy																			IOW; 28	GLN														40th	84
2019	Mason Diaz	68	Chevy																						BRI; 38	ROA	DAR	IND	LVS	RCH							40th	84
2020	Brandon Brown	68	Chevy	DAY; 7	LVS; 11	CAL; 33	PHO; 12	DAR; 13	CLT; 8	BRI; 7	ATL; 12	HOM; 14	HOM; 36	TAL; 11	POC; 33	IND; 11	KEN; 27	KEN; 13	TEX; 10	KAN; 11	ROA; 12	DAY; 34	DOV; 14	DOV; 16	DAY; 26	DAR; 17	RCH; 18	RCH; 11	BRI; 12	LVS; 15	TAL; 9	CLT; 26	KAN; 13	TEX; 5	MAR; 18	PHO; 12	14th	732
2021	Brandon Brown	68	Chevy	DAY; 6	DAY; 8	HOM; 34	LVS; 11	PHO; 3	ATL; 33	MAR; 27	TAL; 7	DAR; 24	DOV; 10	COA; 26	CLT; 4	MOH; 6	TEX; 13	NSH; 35	POC; 15	ROA; 11	ATL; 31	NHA; 17	GLN; 12	IND; 34	MCH; 40	DAY; 34	DAR; 28	RCH; 8	BRI; 14	LVS; 22	TAL; 1	CLT; 22	TEX; 33	KAN; 14	MAR; 36	PHO; 20	18th	620
2022	Brandon Brown	68	Chevy	DAY; 10	CAL; 11	LVS; 29	PHO; 13	ATL; 18	COA; 20	RCH; 8	MAR; 34	TAL; 30	DOV; 18	DAR; 35	TEX; 15	CLT; 17	PIR; 12	NSH; 11	ROA; 34	ATL; 33	NHA; 3	POC; 13		MCH; 13		DAY; 4				TEX; 24	TAL; 33						21st	555
2022	Austin Dillon	68	Chevy																				IND; 26														21st	555
2022	Kris Wright	68	Chevy																						GLN; 34		DAR; 36	KAN; 20	BRI; 25			CLT; 38	LVS; 24	HOM; 27	MAR; 26	PHO; 26	21st	555

=== Car No. 86 history ===
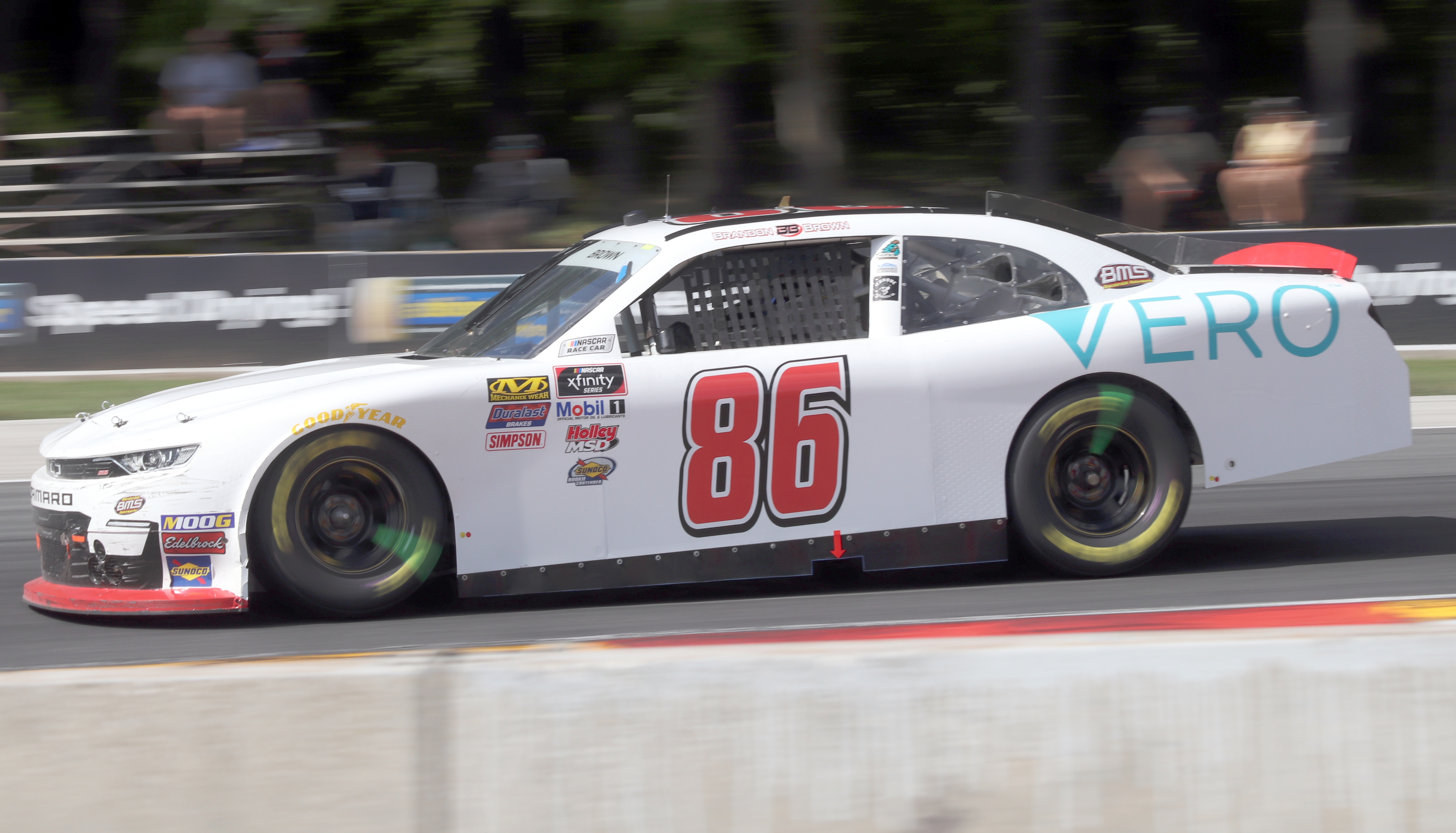
Brandon Brown driving the No. 86 in 2019 at Road America

Brown ran three Xfinity Series races in 2016 with a partnership with GMS Racing. The team finished 29th in its debut race, at Richmond International Raceway. There were a few bumps in the road, such as withdrawing at Charlotte Motor Speedway, but improved its finishes in all three of its races, culminating with a 23rd in the season's final race.

On January 2, 2018, it was announced that Brown would return to the No. 86 car for the season-opening PowerShares QQQ 300 as well as a partial schedule in the No. 90 car.

On September 21, 2018, it was announced that Brandonbilt Motorsports would be competing full-time in the 2019 Xfinity Series under the rebranding title of BMS. The team later announced it would run the number 86.

On January 3, 2019, it was announced that driver Brandon Brown had taken an executive role within the organization. Brown stated it would not affect his driving duties and he was looking forward to the opportunity.

==== Car No. 86 results ====
Year	Driver	No.	Make	1	2	3	4	5	6	7	8	9	10	11	12	13	14	15	16	17	18	19	20	21	22	23	24	25	26	27	28	29	30	31	32	33	Owners	Pts
2016	Brandon Brown	86	Chevy	DAY	ATL	LVS	PHO	CAL	TEX	BRI	RCH	TAL	DOV	CLT	POC	MCH	IOW	DAY	KEN	NHA	IND	IOW	GLN	MOH	BRI	ROA	DAR	RCH; 29	CHI	KEN	DOV	CLT	KAN; 25	TEX	PHO	HOM; 23		
2018	Brandon Brown	86	Chevy	DAY; 36	ATL	LVS	PHO	CAL	TEX	BRI	RCH	TAL	DOV	CLT	POC	MCH	IOW	CHI	DAY	KEN	NHA	IOW	GLN	MOH	BRI	ROA	DAR	IND	LVS	RCH	CLT	DOV	KAN	TEX	PHO	HOM; 24		
2019	Brandon Brown	86	Chevy	DAY; 18	ATL; 13	LVS; 17	PHO; 15	CAL; 15	TEX; 17	BRI; 23		TAL; 15	DOV; 13		POC; 13	MCH; 26	IOW; 31	CHI; 22	DAY; 6	KEN; 17	NHA; 16	IOW; 27	GLN; 18		BRI; 12	ROA; 37	DAR; 33	IND; 28	LVS; 16	RCH; 34		DOV; 11	KAN; 18	TEX; 25	PHO; 20		19th	540
2019	Mason Diaz	86	Chevy								RCH; 36			CLT; 30																							19th	540
2019	Will Rodgers	86	Chevy																					MOH; 12							CLT; 28					HOM; 22	19th	540

=== Car No. 90 history ===
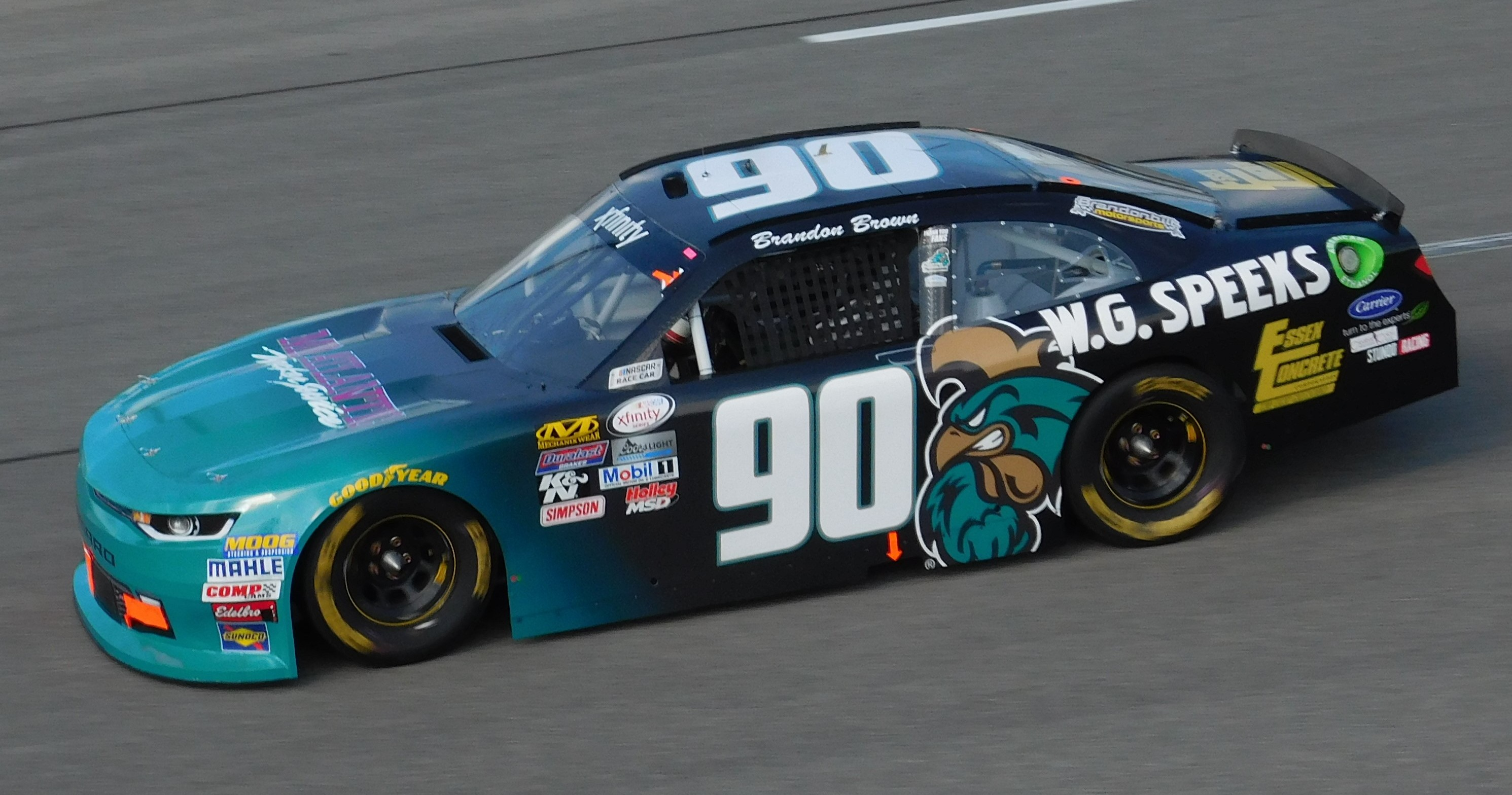
Brandon Brown driving the No. 90 at Richmond Raceway in 2017

On January 5, 2017, it was announced that Brown would attempt to run at least 10 races driving the No. 86 Camaro in the NASCAR Xfinity Series, starting with the season opener at Daytona. Adam Brenner was named the crew chief, and Coastal Carolina University was announced to be the primary sponsor for all but one of the races. The team never entered the Daytona race, and Brandonbilt formed a partnership the following week with King Autosport to have Brown's ten races be in the No. 90 and having Mario Gosselin be the listed owner. Brian Henderson drove for the team at Watkins Glen, finishing 33rd.

On January 2, 2018, it was announced that Brown would return to the Xfinity Series and the 90 in 2018, mixing short tracks, intermediate tracks, and superspeedways.

== Camping World Truck Series ==
=== Truck No. 44 history ===
Although not officially part of the team, Brandonbilt announced that it would use the No. 44 of Martins Motorsports for "select races" in the 2017 season. Brown DNQed at Daytona International Speedway and made the race at spring Martinsville race in the No. 44, Brown was scheduled to attempt also Charlotte, Eldora and fall Martinsville race, but the future of the team was in question after Martins moved up to the Xfinity Series and shut down the No. 44 truck. The team abandoned the No. 44 and went back to the No. 86.

=== Truck No. 86 history ===
The team debuted in 2014, running three races. Brown turned in finishes of 25th at Iowa Speedway in his first Truck start, 19th at New Hampshire Motor Speedway in his second start, and 24th at Martinsville Speedway in his third. He failed to turn in a lead lap finish, but finished all three races. In 2015, the team ran five races. Brown failed to qualify for four others. An oil line failure caused the team's first failure to finish, in the Hyundai Construction Equipment 200 at Atlanta Motor Speedway. Even with four races where the team did not qualify, Brown improved to a then-best finish of 14th at the Lucas Oil 200 at Dover International Speedway. In the season's final race at Homestead-Miami Speedway, Brown's truck stalled after two laps and retired with transmission problems.

The team ran half the schedule in 2016, and Brown finished fourth in the season-opening NextEra Energy Resources 250 with funding from NCaseIt Sports Displays. The team failed to finish its first race of the year in the Jacob Companies 200, when suspension troubles hampered the team's efforts. Brown would not crack the top ten for the rest of the season, and finished last at Gateway Motorsports Park. During 2016, Brandonbilt developed an alliance with Mike Harmon Racing, resulting in Tim Viens running one race for the team.

The No. 86 returned to the track at Charlotte Motor Speedway in 2017 but failed to qualify. The team signed Mason Diaz to drive the No. 86 at Martinsville Speedway. Diaz made a splash during qualifying and scored stage points in Stage One before a cut tire ended his hopes of a good run.
