= 2020 Alsco Uniforms 500 =

NASCAR Cup Series race

Race details
- Race 8 of 36 in the 2020 NASCAR Cup Series
- Date: May 28, 2020
- Location: Charlotte Motor Speedway in Concord, North Carolina
- Course: Permanent racing facility
- Course length: 1.5 miles (2.4 km)
- Distance: 208 laps, 312 mi (500 km)
- Average speed: 125.315 miles per hour (201.675 km/h)

Pole position
Driver	William Byron	Hendrick Motorsports
- Grid positions set by partial inversion of previous race's finishing order

Most laps led
Driver	Kevin Harvick	Stewart-Haas Racing
- Laps: 63

Winner
No. 9	Chase Elliott	Hendrick Motorsports

Television in the United States
- Network: FS1
- Announcers: Mike Joy and Jeff Gordon
- Nielsen ratings: 1.508 million

Radio in the United States
- Radio: PRN
- Booth announcers: Doug Rice and Mark Garrow
- Turn announcers: Rob Albright (1 & 2) and Pat Patterson (3 & 4)

The 2020 Alsco Uniforms 500 was a NASCAR Cup Series race scheduled to be held on May 27, 2020, but run on May 28, 2020 due to Tropical Depression Bertha at Charlotte Motor Speedway in Concord, North Carolina, replacing Sonoma Raceway event. Contested over 208 laps on the 1.5 mile (2.42 km) asphalt speedway, it was the eighth race of the 2020 NASCAR Cup Series season.

The first two stages were 60 laps each, and the final was 88.

== Report ==
=== Background ===
Charlotte Motor Speedway, the track where the race was held.

The race was held at Charlotte Motor Speedway, which is located in Concord, North Carolina. The speedway complex includes a 1.5-mile (2.4 km) quad-oval track that will be utilized for the race, as well as a dragstrip and a dirt track. The speedway was built in 1959 by Bruton Smith and is considered the home track for NASCAR with many race teams based in the Charlotte metropolitan area. The track is owned and operated by Speedway Motorsports Inc. (SMI) with Marcus G. Smith serving as track president.

==== Entry list ====
- (R) denotes rookie driver.
- (i) denotes driver who are ineligible for series driver points.

No.	Driver	Team	Manufacturer
00	Quin Houff (R)	StarCom Racing	Chevrolet
1	Kurt Busch	Chip Ganassi Racing	Chevrolet
2	Brad Keselowski	Team Penske	Ford
3	Austin Dillon	Richard Childress Racing	Chevrolet
4	Kevin Harvick	Stewart-Haas Racing	Ford
6	Ryan Newman	Roush Fenway Racing	Ford
7	Josh Bilicki (i)	Tommy Baldwin Racing	Chevrolet
8	Tyler Reddick (R)	Richard Childress Racing	Chevrolet
9	Chase Elliott	Hendrick Motorsports	Chevrolet
10	Aric Almirola	Stewart-Haas Racing	Ford
11	Denny Hamlin	Joe Gibbs Racing	Toyota
12	Ryan Blaney	Team Penske	Ford
13	Ty Dillon	Germain Racing	Chevrolet
14	Clint Bowyer	Stewart-Haas Racing	Ford
15	Brennan Poole (R)	Premium Motorsports	Chevrolet
17	Chris Buescher	Roush Fenway Racing	Ford
18	Kyle Busch	Joe Gibbs Racing	Toyota
19	Martin Truex Jr.	Joe Gibbs Racing	Toyota
20	Erik Jones	Joe Gibbs Racing	Toyota
21	Matt DiBenedetto	Wood Brothers Racing	Ford
22	Joey Logano	Team Penske	Ford
24	William Byron	Hendrick Motorsports	Chevrolet
27	Gray Gaulding	Rick Ware Racing	Ford
32	Corey LaJoie	Go Fas Racing	Ford
34	Michael McDowell	Front Row Motorsports	Ford
37	Ryan Preece	JTG Daugherty Racing	Chevrolet
38	John Hunter Nemechek (R)	Front Row Motorsports	Ford
41	Cole Custer (R)	Stewart-Haas Racing	Ford
42	Matt Kenseth	Chip Ganassi Racing	Chevrolet
43	Bubba Wallace	Richard Petty Motorsports	Chevrolet
47	Ricky Stenhouse Jr.	JTG Daugherty Racing	Chevrolet
48	Jimmie Johnson	Hendrick Motorsports	Chevrolet
51	Joey Gase (i)	Petty Ware Racing	Ford
53	Garrett Smithley (i)	Rick Ware Racing	Chevrolet
66	Timmy Hill (i)	MBM Motorsports	Toyota
77	J. J. Yeley (i)	Spire Motorsports	Chevrolet
78	B. J. McLeod (i)	B. J. McLeod Motorsports	Ford
88	Alex Bowman	Hendrick Motorsports	Chevrolet
95	Christopher Bell (R)	Leavine Family Racing	Toyota
96	Daniel Suárez	Gaunt Brothers Racing	Toyota
Official entry list

== Qualifying ==
William Byron was awarded the pole for the race as determined by the top 20 from Sunday's finishing order inverted.

=== Starting Lineup ===
Pos	No.	Driver	Team	Manufacturer
1	24	William Byron	Hendrick Motorsports	Chevrolet
2	88	Alex Bowman	Hendrick Motorsports	Chevrolet
3	34	Michael McDowell	Front Row Motorsports	Ford
4	21	Matt DiBenedetto	Wood Brothers Racing	Ford
5	38	John Hunter Nemechek (R)	Front Row Motorsports	Ford
6	10	Aric Almirola	Stewart-Haas Racing	Ford
7	3	Austin Dillon	Richard Childress Racing	Chevrolet
8	22	Joey Logano	Team Penske	Ford
9	41	Cole Custer (R)	Stewart-Haas Racing	Ford
10	20	Erik Jones	Joe Gibbs Racing	Toyota
11	17	Chris Buescher	Roush Fenway Racing	Ford
12	95	Christopher Bell (R)	Leavine Family Racing	Toyota
13	8	Tyler Reddick (R)	Richard Childress Racing	Chevrolet
14	1	Kurt Busch	Chip Ganassi Racing	Chevrolet
15	19	Martin Truex Jr.	Joe Gibbs Racing	Toyota
16	4	Kevin Harvick	Stewart-Haas Racing	Ford
17	18	Kyle Busch	Joe Gibbs Racing	Toyota
18	12	Ryan Blaney	Team Penske	Ford
19	9	Chase Elliott	Hendrick Motorsports	Chevrolet
20	2	Brad Keselowski	Team Penske	Ford
21	77	J. J. Yeley (i)	Spire Motorsports	Chevrolet
22	37	Ryan Preece	JTG Daugherty Racing	Chevrolet
23	32	Corey LaJoie	Go Fas Racing	Ford
24	47	Ricky Stenhouse Jr.	JTG Daugherty Racing	Chevrolet
25	13	Ty Dillon	Germain Racing	Chevrolet
26	42	Matt Kenseth	Chip Ganassi Racing	Chevrolet
27	6	Ryan Newman	Roush Fenway Racing	Ford
28	96	Daniel Suárez	Gaunt Brothers Racing	Toyota
29	11	Denny Hamlin	Joe Gibbs Racing	Toyota
30	15	Brennan Poole (R)	Premium Motorsports	Chevrolet
31	27	Gray Gaulding	Rick Ware Racing	Ford
32	78	B. J. McLeod (i)	B. J. McLeod Motorsports	Ford
33	53	Garrett Smithley (i)	Rick Ware Racing	Chevrolet
34	66	Timmy Hill (i)	MBM Motorsports	Toyota
35	00	Quin Houff (R)	StarCom Racing	Chevrolet
36	51	Joey Gase (i)	Petty Ware Racing	Ford
37	7	Josh Bilicki (i)	Tommy Baldwin Racing	Chevrolet
38	43	Bubba Wallace	Richard Petty Motorsports	Chevrolet
39	14	Clint Bowyer	Stewart-Haas Racing	Ford
40	48	Jimmie Johnson	Hendrick Motorsports	Chevrolet
Official starting lineup

== Race ==
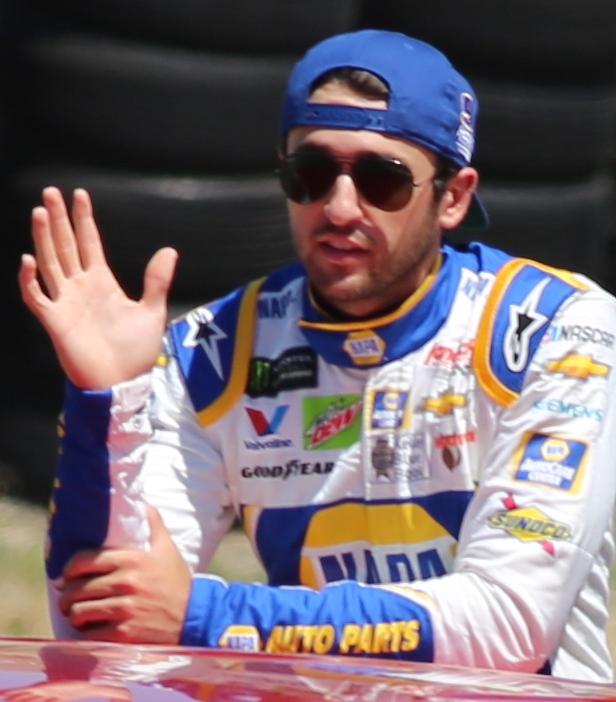
Chase Elliott won the race.

=== Stage Results ===
Stage One Laps: 55

Pos	No	Driver	Team	Manufacturer	Points
1	22	Joey Logano	Team Penske	Ford	10
2	12	Ryan Blaney	Team Penske	Ford	9
3	21	Matt DiBenedetto	Wood Brothers Racing	Ford	8
4	4	Kevin Harvick	Stewart-Haas Racing	Ford	7
5	88	Alex Bowman	Hendrick Motorsports	Chevrolet	6
6	47	Ricky Stenhouse Jr.	JTG Daugherty Racing	Chevrolet	5
7	3	Austin Dillon	Richard Childress Racing	Chevrolet	4
8	1	Kurt Busch	Chip Ganassi Racing	Chevrolet	3
9	9	Chase Elliott	Hendrick Motorsports	Chevrolet	2
10	17	Chris Buescher	Roush Fenway Racing	Ford	1
Official stage one results

Stage Two Laps: 60

Pos	No	Driver	Team	Manufacturer	Points
1	88	Alex Bowman	Hendrick Motorsports	Chevrolet	10
2	12	Ryan Blaney	Team Penske	Ford	9
3	22	Joey Logano	Team Penske	Ford	8
4	9	Chase Elliott	Hendrick Motorsports	Chevrolet	7
5	4	Kevin Harvick	Stewart-Haas Racing	Ford	6
6	1	Kurt Busch	Chip Ganassi Racing	Chevrolet	5
7	3	Austin Dillon	Richard Childress Racing	Chevrolet	4
8	38	John Hunter Nemechek (R)	Front Row Motorsports	Ford	3
9	95	Christopher Bell (R)	Leavine Family Racing	Toyota	2
10	43	Bubba Wallace	Richard Petty Motorsports	Chevrolet	1
Official stage two results

=== Final Stage Results ===
Stage Three Laps: 93

Pos	Grid	No	Driver	Team	Manufacturer	Laps	Points
1	19	9	Chase Elliott	Hendrick Motorsports	Chevrolet	208	49
2	29	11	Denny Hamlin	Joe Gibbs Racing	Toyota	208	35
3	18	12	Ryan Blaney	Team Penske	Ford	208	52
4	24	47	Ricky Stenhouse Jr.	JTG Daugherty Racing	Chevrolet	208	38
5	14	1	Kurt Busch	Chip Ganassi Racing	Chevrolet	208	40
6	8	22	Joey Logano	Team Penske	Ford	208	49
7	20	2	Brad Keselowski	Team Penske	Ford	208	30
8	7	3	Austin Dillon	Richard Childress Racing	Chevrolet	208	37
9	15	19	Martin Truex Jr.	Joe Gibbs Racing	Toyota	208	28
10	16	4	Kevin Harvick	Stewart-Haas Racing	Ford	208	40
11	40	48	Jimmie Johnson	Hendrick Motorsports	Chevrolet	208	26
12	1	24	William Byron	Hendrick Motorsports	Chevrolet	208	25
13	5	38	John Hunter Nemechek (R)	Front Row Motorsports	Ford	208	27
14	13	8	Tyler Reddick (R)	Richard Childress Racing	Chevrolet	208	23
15	4	21	Matt DiBenedetto	Wood Brothers Racing	Ford	208	30
16	39	14	Clint Bowyer	Stewart-Haas Racing	Ford	208	21
17	27	6	Ryan Newman	Roush Fenway Racing	Ford	208	20
18	9	41	Cole Custer (R)	Stewart-Haas Racing	Ford	208	19
19	23	32	Corey LaJoie	Go Fas Racing	Ford	208	18
20	6	10	Aric Almirola	Stewart-Haas Racing	Ford	208	17
21	12	95	Christopher Bell (R)	Leavine Family Racing	Toyota	208	18
22	11	17	Chris Buescher	Roush Fenway Racing	Ford	208	16
23	26	42	Matt Kenseth	Chip Ganassi Racing	Chevrolet	207	14
24	22	37	Ryan Preece	JTG Daugherty Racing	Chevrolet	207	13
25	3	34	Michael McDowell	Front Row Motorsports	Ford	207	12
26	10	20	Erik Jones	Joe Gibbs Racing	Toyota	207	11
27	25	13	Ty Dillon	Germain Racing	Chevrolet	207	10
28	28	96	Daniel Suárez	Gaunt Brothers Racing	Toyota	207	9
29	17	18	Kyle Busch	Joe Gibbs Racing	Toyota	207	8
30	31	27	Gray Gaulding	Rick Ware Racing	Ford	206	7
31	2	88	Alex Bowman	Hendrick Motorsports	Chevrolet	206	22
32	35	00	Quin Houff (R)	StarCom Racing	Chevrolet	205	5
33	34	66	Timmy Hill (i)	MBM Motorsports	Toyota	205	0
34	21	77	J. J. Yeley (i)	Spire Motorsports	Chevrolet	204	0
35	32	78	B. J. McLeod (i)	B. J. McLeod Motorsports	Ford	203	0
36	37	7	Josh Bilicki (i)	Tommy Baldwin Racing	Chevrolet	200	0
37	38	43	Bubba Wallace	Richard Petty Motorsports	Chevrolet	165	2
38	30	15	Brennan Poole (R)	Premium Motorsports	Chevrolet	86	1
39	36	51	Joey Gase (i)	Petty Ware Racing	Ford	8	0
40	33	53	Garrett Smithley (i)	Rick Ware Racing	Chevrolet	0	0
Official race results

=== Race statistics ===
- Lead changes: 15 among 8 different drivers
- Cautions/Laps: 7 for 37
- Red flags: 1 for 1 hour, 14 minutes and 2 seconds
- Time of race: 2 hours, 29 minutes and 23 seconds
- Average speed: 125.315 miles per hour (201.675 km/h)

== Media ==
=== Television ===
The Alsco Uniforms 500 was carried by FS1 in the United States. Mike Joy and five-time Charlotte winner Jeff Gordon covered the race from the Fox Sports studio in Charlotte. Vince Welch handled the pit road duties. Larry McReynolds provided insight from the Fox Sports studio in Charlotte.

FS1
Booth announcers	Pit reporter	In-race analyst
Lap-by-lap: Mike Joy; Color-commentator: Jeff Gordon	Vince Welch	Larry McReynolds

=== Radio ===
Radio coverage of the race was broadcast by the Performance Racing Network (PRN), and was simulcasted on Sirius XM NASCAR Radio. Doug Rice and Mark Garrow called the race in the booth when the field raced through the quad-oval. Rob Albright reported the race from a billboard in turn 2 when the field was racing through turns 1 and 2 and halfway down the backstretch. Pat Patterson called the race from a billboard outside of turn 3 when the field raced through the other half of the backstretch and through turns 3 and 4. Brad Gillie, Brett McMillan and Wendy Venturini were the pit reporters during the broadcast.

PRN Radio
Booth announcers	Turn announcers	Pit reporters
Lead announcer: Doug Rice; Announcer: Mark Garrow	Turns 1 & 2: Rob Albright; Turns 3 & 4: Pat Patterson	Brad Gillie; Brett McMillan; Wendy Venturini

== Standings after the race ==
Drivers' Championship standings

	Pos	Driver	Points
	1	Kevin Harvick	331
	2	Joey Logano	317 (–14)
1	3	Chase Elliott	290 (–41)
1	4	Alex Bowman	288 (–43)
	5	Brad Keselowski	265 (–66)
1	6	Ryan Blaney	264 (–67)
1	7	Martin Truex Jr.	263 (–68)
	8	Denny Hamlin	244 (–87)
1	9	Aric Almirola	225 (–106)
2	10	Kurt Busch	223 (–108)
	11	Matt DiBenedetto	220 (–111)
3	12	Kyle Busch	217 (–114)
	13	Erik Jones	193 (–138)
	14	Clint Bowyer	192 (–139)
3	15	Austin Dillon	190 (–141)
1	16	Jimmie Johnson	188 (–143)
Official driver's standings

Manufacturers' Championship standings

	Pos	Manufacturer	Points
	1	Ford	295
1	2	Chevrolet	276 (–19)
1	3	Toyota	271 (–24)

- Note: Only the first 16 positions are included for the driver standings.
- . – Driver has clinched a position in the NASCAR Cup Series playoffs.

Previous race: 2020 Coca-Cola 600	NASCAR Cup Series; 2020 season	Next race: 2020 Supermarket Heroes 500
