= 2020 Coca-Cola 600 =

NASCAR Cup Series race

Race details
- Race 7 of 36 in the 2020 NASCAR Cup Series
- 2020 Coca-Cola 600 program cover
- Date: May 24–25, 2020 (Note: The race started on Sunday evening, and following a rain delay of over an hour, concluded at 12:09 am Eastern Daylight Time (EDT) on Monday morning.)
- Location: Charlotte Motor Speedway in Concord, North Carolina
- Course: Permanent racing facility
- Course length: 1.5 miles (2.4 km)
- Distance: 405 laps, 607.5 mi (977.67 km)
- Scheduled distance: 400 laps, 600 mi (965.6 km)
- Average speed: 135.024 miles per hour (217.300 km/h)

Pole position
Driver	Kurt Busch	Chip Ganassi Racing
- Time: 29.790

Most laps led
Driver	Alex Bowman	Hendrick Motorsports
- Laps: 164

Winner
No. 2	Brad Keselowski	Team Penske

Television in the United States
- Network: Fox
- Announcers: Mike Joy and Jeff Gordon
- Nielsen ratings: 3.963 million

Radio in the United States
- Radio: PRN
- Booth announcers: Doug Rice and Mark Garrow
- Turn announcers: Rob Albright (1 & 2) and Pat Patterson (3 & 4)

The 2020 Coca-Cola 600, the 61st running of the event, was a NASCAR Cup Series race held at Charlotte Motor Speedway in Concord, North Carolina, which started on May 24 and concluded in the early hours of May 25, 2020.

The seventh race of the 2020 NASCAR Cup Series season, the Coca-Cola 600 was scheduled to be held over 400 laps of the 1.5-mile (2.4-kilometre) asphalt speedway, but following a late-race spin by William Byron, a caution period took the race into an overtime finish. Brad Keselowski took the victory after 405 laps had been completed; the 607.5 miles (977.7 kilometres) completed was the longest race distance in NASCAR history.

== Report ==
=== Background ===
Charlotte Motor Speedway, the track where the race was held.

The race was held at Charlotte Motor Speedway, located in Concord, North Carolina. The speedway complex includes a 1.5-mile (2.4 km) quad-oval track that was utilized for the race, as well as a dragstrip and a dirt track. The speedway was built in 1959 by Bruton Smith and is considered the home track for NASCAR with many race teams based in the Charlotte metropolitan area. The track is owned and operated by Speedway Motorsports Inc. (SMI) with Marcus G. Smith serving as track president.

All four stages were scheduled to consist of 100 laps.

The race was held behind closed doors to an extent, with no spectators admitted in the grandstands. However, owners of the condominiums overlooking turn 1 of the track were able to watch the race from their residences (restricted to up to five per residence for social distancing requirements), for a maximum of 260 fans. As one of the first major events to allow limited spectators, tickets to the event, available exclusively to ownership of the units, started at $7,802 for two nights in a unit, as offered on short-term vacation rental sites.

==== Entry list ====
- (R) denotes rookie driver.
- (i) denotes driver who are ineligible for series driver points.

No.	Driver	Team	Manufacturer
00	Quin Houff (R)	StarCom Racing	Chevrolet
1	Kurt Busch	Chip Ganassi Racing	Chevrolet
2	Brad Keselowski	Team Penske	Ford
3	Austin Dillon	Richard Childress Racing	Chevrolet
4	Kevin Harvick	Stewart-Haas Racing	Ford
6	Ryan Newman	Roush Fenway Racing	Ford
7	J. J. Yeley (i)	Tommy Baldwin Racing	Chevrolet
8	Tyler Reddick (R)	Richard Childress Racing	Chevrolet
9	Chase Elliott	Hendrick Motorsports	Chevrolet
10	Aric Almirola	Stewart-Haas Racing	Ford
11	Denny Hamlin	Joe Gibbs Racing	Toyota
12	Ryan Blaney	Team Penske	Ford
13	Ty Dillon	Germain Racing	Chevrolet
14	Clint Bowyer	Stewart-Haas Racing	Ford
15	Brennan Poole (R)	Premium Motorsports	Chevrolet
17	Chris Buescher	Roush Fenway Racing	Ford
18	Kyle Busch	Joe Gibbs Racing	Toyota
19	Martin Truex Jr.	Joe Gibbs Racing	Toyota
20	Erik Jones	Joe Gibbs Racing	Toyota
21	Matt DiBenedetto	Wood Brothers Racing	Ford
22	Joey Logano	Team Penske	Ford
24	William Byron	Hendrick Motorsports	Chevrolet
27	Gray Gaulding	Rick Ware Racing	Ford
32	Corey LaJoie	Go Fas Racing	Ford
34	Michael McDowell	Front Row Motorsports	Ford
37	Ryan Preece	JTG Daugherty Racing	Chevrolet
38	John Hunter Nemechek (R)	Front Row Motorsports	Ford
41	Cole Custer (R)	Stewart-Haas Racing	Ford
42	Matt Kenseth	Chip Ganassi Racing	Chevrolet
43	Bubba Wallace	Richard Petty Motorsports	Chevrolet
47	Ricky Stenhouse Jr.	JTG Daugherty Racing	Chevrolet
48	Jimmie Johnson	Hendrick Motorsports	Chevrolet
51	Joey Gase (i)	Petty Ware Racing	Ford
53	Garrett Smithley (i)	Rick Ware Racing	Chevrolet
66	Timmy Hill (i)	MBM Motorsports	Toyota
77	Ross Chastain (i)	Spire Motorsports	Chevrolet
78	B. J. McLeod (i)	B. J. McLeod Motorsports	Ford
88	Alex Bowman	Hendrick Motorsports	Chevrolet
95	Christopher Bell (R)	Leavine Family Racing	Toyota
96	Daniel Suárez	Gaunt Brothers Racing	Toyota
Official entry list

== Qualifying ==
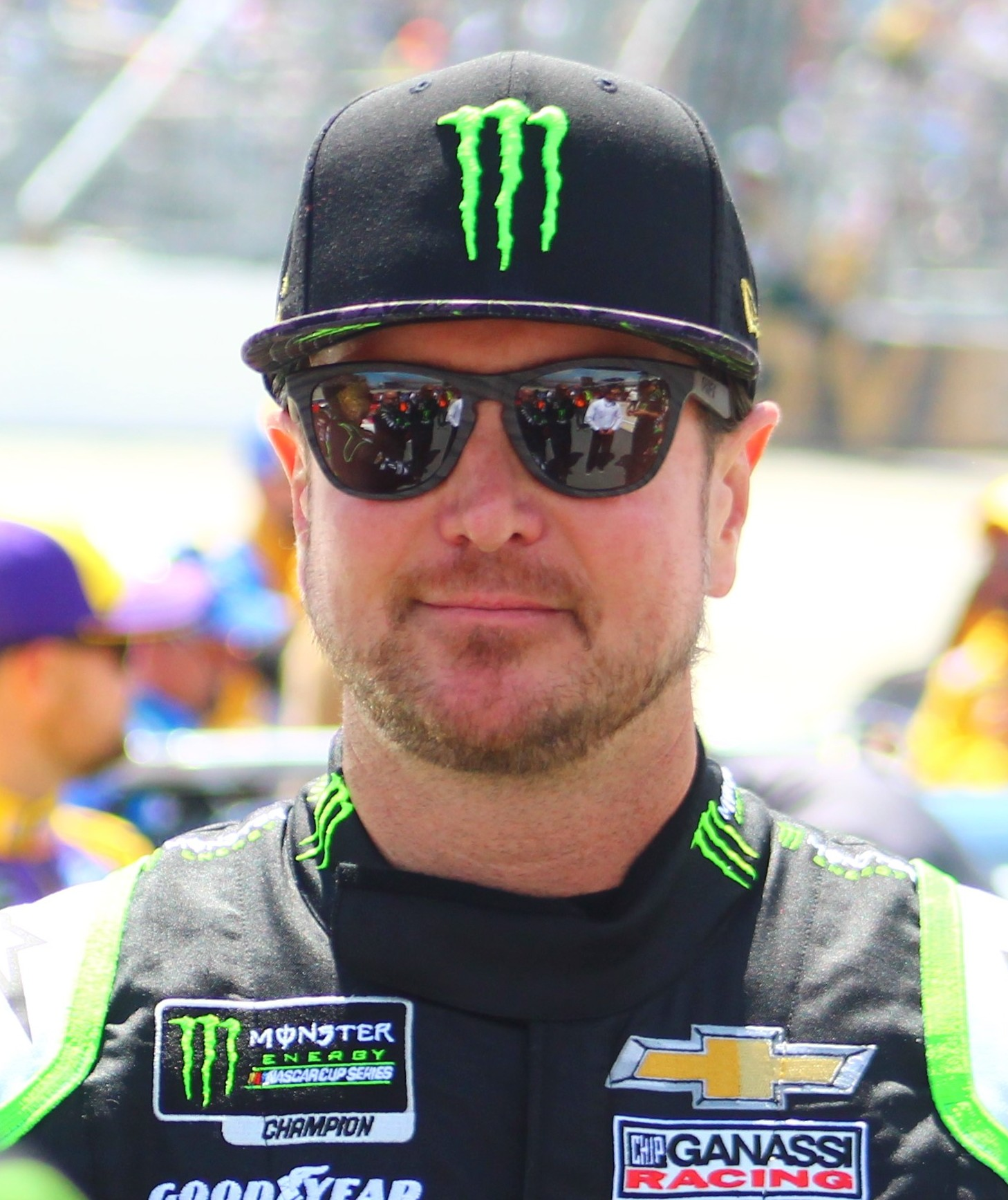
Kurt Busch scored the pole position.

Kurt Busch scored the pole for the race with a time of 29.790 and a speed of 181.269 mph (291.724 km/h).

=== Qualifying results ===
Pos	No.	Driver	Team	Manufacturer	Time
1	1	Kurt Busch	Chip Ganassi Racing	Chevrolet	29.790
2	48	Jimmie Johnson	Hendrick Motorsports	Chevrolet	29.799
3	9	Chase Elliott	Hendrick Motorsports	Chevrolet	29.834
4	42	Matt Kenseth	Chip Ganassi Racing	Chevrolet	29.847
5	8	Tyler Reddick (R)	Richard Childress Racing	Chevrolet	29.850
6	3	Austin Dillon	Richard Childress Racing	Chevrolet	29.877
7	22	Joey Logano	Team Penske	Ford	29.925
8	19	Martin Truex Jr.	Joe Gibbs Racing	Toyota	29.946
9	2	Brad Keselowski	Team Penske	Ford	29.953
10	24	William Byron	Hendrick Motorsports	Chevrolet	29.956
11	18	Kyle Busch	Joe Gibbs Racing	Toyota	30.019
12	88	Alex Bowman	Hendrick Motorsports	Chevrolet	30.020
13	11	Denny Hamlin	Joe Gibbs Racing	Toyota	30.027
14	20	Erik Jones	Joe Gibbs Racing	Toyota	30.033
15	95	Christopher Bell (R)	Leavine Family Racing	Toyota	30.042
16	13	Ty Dillon	Germain Racing	Chevrolet	30.059
17	47	Ricky Stenhouse Jr.	JTG Daugherty Racing	Chevrolet	30.071
18	6	Ryan Newman	Roush Fenway Racing	Ford	30.072
19	17	Chris Buescher	Roush Fenway Racing	Ford	30.081
20	14	Clint Bowyer	Stewart-Haas Racing	Ford	30.095
21	77	Ross Chastain (i)	Spire Motorsports	Chevrolet	30.150
22	4	Kevin Harvick	Stewart-Haas Racing	Ford	30.156
23	43	Bubba Wallace	Richard Petty Motorsports	Chevrolet	30.172
24	32	Corey LaJoie	Go Fas Racing	Ford	30.183
25	38	John Hunter Nemechek (R)	Front Row Motorsports	Ford	30.254
26	12	Ryan Blaney	Team Penske	Ford	30.313
27	34	Michael McDowell	Front Row Motorsports	Ford	30.324
28	41	Cole Custer (R)	Stewart-Haas Racing	Ford	30.334
29	37	Ryan Preece	JTG Daugherty Racing	Chevrolet	30.352
30	00	Quin Houff (R)	StarCom Racing	Chevrolet	30.848
31	27	Gray Gaulding	Rick Ware Racing	Ford	31.160
32	66	Timmy Hill (i)	MBM Motorsports	Toyota	31.234
33	21	Matt DiBenedetto	Wood Brothers Racing	Ford	31.452
34	7	J. J. Yeley (i)	Tommy Baldwin Racing	Chevrolet	31.480
35	15	Brennan Poole (R)	Premium Motorsports	Chevrolet	31.502
36	78	B. J. McLeod (i)	B. J. McLeod Motorsports	Ford	31.590
37	96	Daniel Suárez	Gaunt Brothers Racing	Toyota	31.858
38	53	Garrett Smithley (i)	Rick Ware Racing	Chevrolet	31.971
39	51	Joey Gase (i)	Petty Ware Racing	Ford	33.538
40	10	Aric Almirola	Stewart-Haas Racing	Ford	0.000
Official qualifying results

== Race ==
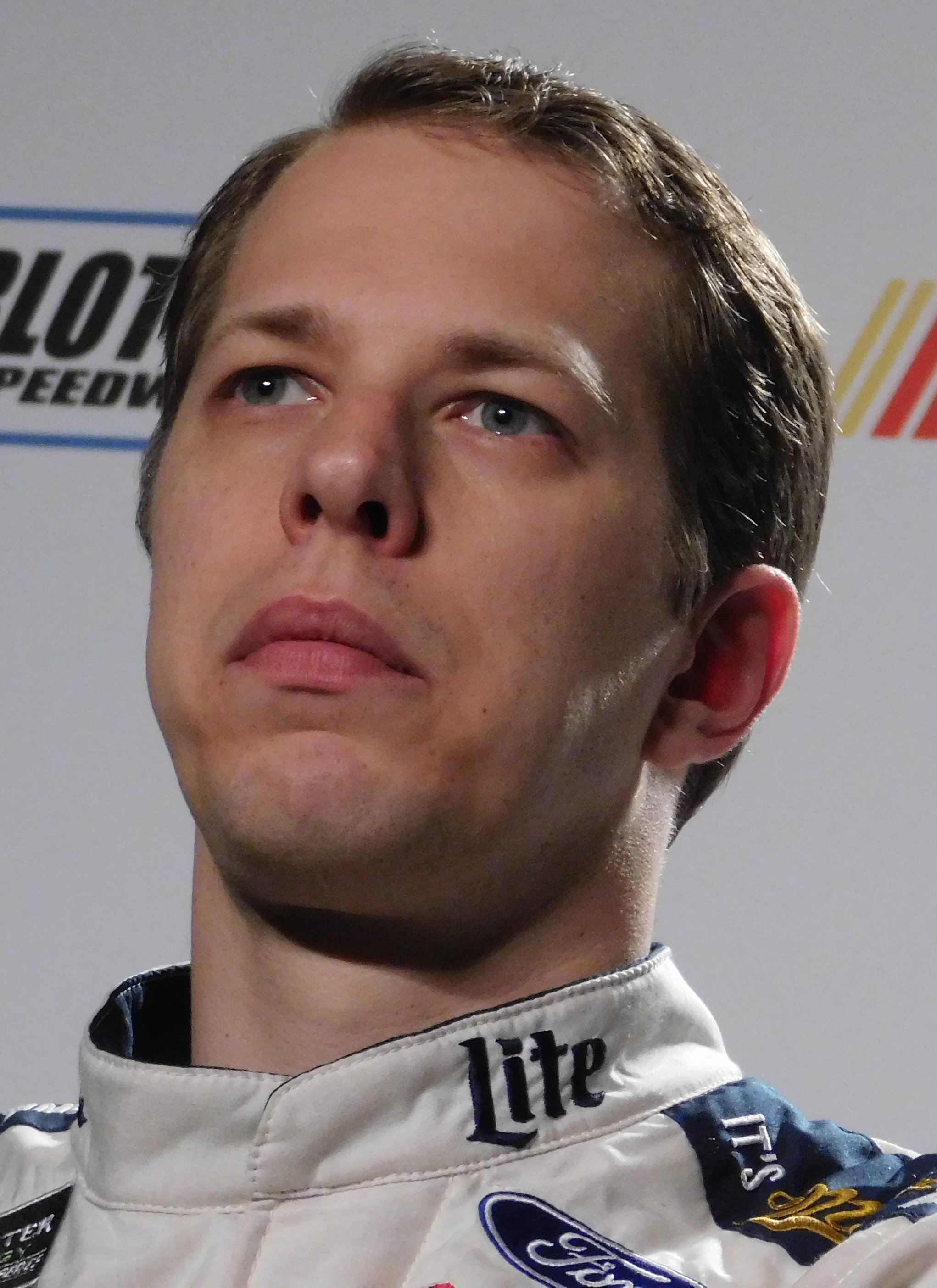
Brad Keselowski won the race.

=== Stage Results ===
Stage One Laps: 100

Pos	No	Driver	Team	Manufacturer	Points
1	88	Alex Bowman	Hendrick Motorsports	Chevrolet	10
2	19	Martin Truex Jr.	Joe Gibbs Racing	Toyota	9
3	9	Chase Elliott	Hendrick Motorsports	Chevrolet	8
4	8	Tyler Reddick (R)	Richard Childress Racing	Chevrolet	7
5	22	Joey Logano	Team Penske	Ford	6
6	18	Kyle Busch	Joe Gibbs Racing	Toyota	5
7	3	Austin Dillon	Richard Childress Racing	Chevrolet	4
8	24	William Byron	Hendrick Motorsports	Chevrolet	3
9	1	Kurt Busch	Chip Ganassi Racing	Chevrolet	2
10	6	Ryan Newman	Roush Fenway Racing	Ford	1
Official stage one results

Stage Two Laps: 100

Pos	No	Driver	Team	Manufacturer	Points
1	88	Alex Bowman	Hendrick Motorsports	Chevrolet	10
2	19	Martin Truex Jr.	Joe Gibbs Racing	Toyota	9
3	18	Kyle Busch	Joe Gibbs Racing	Toyota	8
4	24	William Byron	Hendrick Motorsports	Chevrolet	7
5	9	Chase Elliott	Hendrick Motorsports	Chevrolet	6
6	20	Erik Jones	Joe Gibbs Racing	Toyota	5
7	22	Joey Logano	Team Penske	Ford	4
8	3	Austin Dillon	Richard Childress Racing	Chevrolet	3
9	12	Ryan Blaney	Team Penske	Ford	2
10	4	Kevin Harvick	Stewart-Haas Racing	Ford	1
Official stage two results

Stage Three Laps: 100

Pos	No	Driver	Team	Manufacturer	Points
1	22	Joey Logano	Team Penske	Ford	10
2	88	Alex Bowman	Hendrick Motorsports	Chevrolet	9
3	12	Ryan Blaney	Team Penske	Ford	8
4	19	Martin Truex Jr.	Joe Gibbs Racing	Toyota	7
5	18	Kyle Busch	Joe Gibbs Racing	Toyota	6
6	20	Erik Jones	Joe Gibbs Racing	Toyota	5
7	2	Brad Keselowski	Team Penske	Ford	4
8	3	Austin Dillon	Richard Childress Racing	Chevrolet	3
9	24	William Byron	Hendrick Motorsports	Chevrolet	2
10	8	Tyler Reddick (R)	Richard Childress Racing	Chevrolet	1
Official stage three results

=== Final Stage Results ===
Stage Four Laps: 100

Pos	Grid	No	Driver	Team	Manufacturer	Laps	Points
1	9	2	Brad Keselowski	Team Penske	Ford	405	44
2	3	9	Chase Elliott	Hendrick Motorsports	Chevrolet	405	49
3	26	12	Ryan Blaney	Team Penske	Ford	405	44
4	11	18	Kyle Busch	Joe Gibbs Racing	Toyota	405	52
5	22	4	Kevin Harvick	Stewart-Haas Racing	Ford	405	33
6	8	19	Martin Truex Jr.	Joe Gibbs Racing	Toyota	405	56
7	1	1	Kurt Busch	Chip Ganassi Racing	Chevrolet	405	32
8	5	8	Tyler Reddick (R)	Richard Childress Racing	Chevrolet	405	37
9	15	95	Christopher Bell (R)	Leavine Family Racing	Toyota	405	28
10	19	17	Chris Buescher	Roush Fenway Racing	Ford	405	27
11	14	20	Erik Jones	Joe Gibbs Racing	Toyota	405	36
12	28	41	Cole Custer (R)	Stewart-Haas Racing	Ford	405	25
13	7	22	Joey Logano	Team Penske	Ford	405	44
14	6	3	Austin Dillon	Richard Childress Racing	Chevrolet	405	33
15	40	10	Aric Almirola	Stewart-Haas Racing	Ford	405	22
16	25	38	John Hunter Nemechek (R)	Front Row Motorsports	Ford	405	21
17	33	21	Matt DiBenedetto	Wood Brothers Racing	Ford	405	20
18	27	34	Michael McDowell	Front Row Motorsports	Ford	405	19
19	12	88	Alex Bowman	Hendrick Motorsports	Chevrolet	405	47
20	10	24	William Byron	Hendrick Motorsports	Chevrolet	404	29
21	21	77	Ross Chastain (i)	Spire Motorsports	Chevrolet	403	0
22	29	37	Ryan Preece	JTG Daugherty Racing	Chevrolet	403	15
23	24	32	Corey LaJoie	Go Fas Racing	Ford	403	14
24	17	47	Ricky Stenhouse Jr.	JTG Daugherty Racing	Chevrolet	402	13
25	16	13	Ty Dillon	Germain Racing	Chevrolet	401	12
26	4	42	Matt Kenseth	Chip Ganassi Racing	Chevrolet	401	11
27	18	6	Ryan Newman	Roush Fenway Racing	Ford	400	11
28	37	96	Daniel Suárez	Gaunt Brothers Racing	Toyota	399	9
29	13	11	Denny Hamlin	Joe Gibbs Racing	Toyota	398	8
30	35	15	Brennan Poole (R)	Premium Motorsports	Chevrolet	398	7
31	31	27	Gray Gaulding	Rick Ware Racing	Ford	397	6
32	36	78	B. J. McLeod (i)	B. J. McLeod Motorsports	Ford	393	0
33	38	53	Garrett Smithley (i)	Rick Ware Racing	Chevrolet	391	0
34	32	66	Timmy Hill (i)	MBM Motorsports	Toyota	390	0
35	30	00	Quin Houff	StarCom Racing	Chevrolet	390	2
36	39	51	Joey Gase (i)	Petty Ware Racing	Ford	385	0
37	34	7	J. J. Yeley (i)	Tommy Baldwin Racing	Chevrolet	251	0
38	23	43	Bubba Wallace	Richard Petty Motorsports	Chevrolet	164	1
39	20	14	Clint Bowyer	Stewart-Haas Racing	Ford	96	1
DSQ	2	48	Jimmie Johnson (Note: Johnson initially finished 2nd, but was disqualified after failing post-race inspection.)	Hendrick Motorsports	Chevrolet	405	1
Official race results

=== Race statistics ===
- Lead changes: 20 among 11 different drivers
- Cautions/Laps: 8 for 52
- Red flags: 1 for 1 hour, 8 minutes and 35 seconds
- Time of race: 4 hours, 29 minutes and 55 seconds
- Average speed: 135.024 miles per hour (217.300 km/h)

== Media ==
=== Television ===
Fox Sports televised the race in the United States for the 20th consecutive year. Mike Joy and three-time Coca-Cola 600 winner, Jeff Gordon covered the race from the Steve Byrnes Studio in Charlotte. Jamie Little and Regan Smith handled the pit road duties. Larry McReynolds provided insight from the Fox Sports studio in Charlotte.

Fox
Booth announcers	Pit reporters	In-race analyst
Lap-by-lap: Mike Joy; Color-commentator: Jeff Gordon	Jamie Little; Regan Smith	Larry McReynolds

=== Radio ===
Radio coverage of the race was broadcast by the Performance Racing Network (PRN), and was simulcasted on Sirius XM NASCAR Radio. Doug Rice and Mark Garrow called the race in the booth when the field raced through the quad-oval. Rob Albright called the race from a billboard in turn 2 when the field was racing through turns 1 and 2 and halfway down the backstretch. Pat Patterson called the race from a billboard outside of turn 3 when the field raced through the other half of the backstretch and through turns 3 and 4. Brad Gillie, Brett McMillan and Wendy Venturini were the pit reporters during the broadcast.

PRN Radio
Booth announcers	Turn announcers	Pit reporters
Lead announcer: Doug Rice; Announcer: Mark Garrow	Turns 1 & 2: Rob Albright; Turns 3 & 4: Pat Patterson	Brad Gillie; Brett McMillan; Wendy Venturini

== Standings after the race ==
Drivers' Championship standings

	Pos	Driver	Points
	1	Kevin Harvick	291
	2	Joey Logano	268 (–23)
	3	Alex Bowman	266 (–25)
1	4	Chase Elliott	241 (–50)
1	5	Brad Keselowski	235 (–56)
2	6	Martin Truex Jr.	235 (–56)
4	7	Ryan Blaney	212 (–79)
4	8	Denny Hamlin	209 (–82)
4	9	Kyle Busch	209 (–82)
3	10	Aric Almirola	208 (–83)
2	11	Matt DiBenedetto	190 (–101)
2	12	Kurt Busch	182 (–108)
2	13	Erik Jones	182 (–109)
4	14	Clint Bowyer	171 (–120)
3	15	Jimmie Johnson	162 (–129)
1	16	Tyler Reddick	162 (–129)
Official driver's standings

Manufacturers' Championship standings

Pos	Manufacturer	Points
1	Ford	261
2	Toyota	236 (–25)
3	Chevrolet	236 (–25)

- Note: Only the first 16 positions are included for the driver standings.
- . – Driver has clinched a position in the NASCAR Cup Series playoffs.

== Notes ==
Previous race: 2020 Toyota 500	NASCAR Cup Series; 2020 season	Next race: 2020 Alsco Uniforms 500
