= 2020 Toyota 500 =

NASCAR Cup Series race

Race details
- Race 6 of 36 in the 2020 NASCAR Cup Series
- Date: May 20, 2020
- Location: Darlington Raceway in Darlington, South Carolina
- Course: Permanent racing facility
- Course length: 1.366 miles (2.198 km)
- Distance: 208 laps, 284.128 mi (457.162 km)
- Scheduled distance: 228 laps, 311.448 mi (501.12 km)
- Average speed: 104.984 miles per hour (168.955 km/h)

Pole position
Driver	Ryan Preece	JTG Daugherty Racing
- Grid positions set by partial inversion of previous race's finishing order

Most laps led
Driver	Clint Bowyer	Stewart-Haas Racing
- Laps: 71

Winner
No. 11	Denny Hamlin	Joe Gibbs Racing

Television in the United States
- Network: FS1
- Announcers: Mike Joy and Jeff Gordon
- Nielsen ratings: 2.087 million

Radio in the United States
- Radio: MRN
- Booth announcers: Alex Hayden and Dave Moody
- Turn announcers: Dillon Welch (1 & 2) and Steve Post (3 & 4)

The 2020 Toyota 500 was a NASCAR Cup Series race held on May 20, 2020, at Darlington Raceway in Darlington, South Carolina, replacing Richmond Raceway's Toyota Owners 400. Contested over 208 laps—shortened from 228 laps due to rain, on the 1.366-mile (2.198 km) egg-shaped oval, it was the sixth race of the 2020 NASCAR Cup Series season and the 57th edition of the event.

There were three stages: first two were 75 laps each & the final was originally scheduled 78 laps, but reduced to 58 laps by weather.

== Report ==
=== Background ===
Layout of Darlington Raceway, the track where the race is held.

The event was the second NASCAR Cup Series race held following a hiatus brought on by the COVID-19 pandemic in the United States, after the formal resumption of the season with The Real Heroes 400 three days earlier, also at Darlington. The race marked the first Cup Series event to be held on a Wednesday since the 1984 Firecracker 400 at Daytona (until 1987, the Firecracker 400 was always held on July 4, regardless of day) — a race also noted for hosting Richard Petty's 200th and final Cup Series victory. It was the 57th edition of the event, dating to the 1950 Southern 500 (races billed as the Southern 500 from 2005 to 2020 ware lineally related the 1957 Rebel 300; for the 2021 season, with two race meetings scheduled, Darlington swapped the lineage of both races). It was the first scheduled Cup Series Darlington race with scheduled 300 mile (or 500 km distance, which is similar) distance since 1963, when the Rebel 300 was run in two 150-mile heat races.

==== Entry list ====
- (R) denotes rookie driver.
- (i) denotes driver who are ineligible for series driver points.

No.	Driver	Team	Manufacturer
00	Quin Houff (R)	StarCom Racing	Chevrolet
1	Kurt Busch	Chip Ganassi Racing	Chevrolet
2	Brad Keselowski	Team Penske	Ford
3	Austin Dillon	Richard Childress Racing	Chevrolet
4	Kevin Harvick	Stewart-Haas Racing	Ford
6	Ryan Newman	Roush Fenway Racing	Ford
8	Tyler Reddick (R)	Richard Childress Racing	Chevrolet
9	Chase Elliott	Hendrick Motorsports	Chevrolet
10	Aric Almirola	Stewart-Haas Racing	Ford
11	Denny Hamlin	Joe Gibbs Racing	Toyota
12	Ryan Blaney	Team Penske	Ford
13	Ty Dillon	Germain Racing	Chevrolet
14	Clint Bowyer	Stewart-Haas Racing	Ford
15	Brennan Poole (R)	Premium Motorsports	Chevrolet
17	Chris Buescher	Roush Fenway Racing	Ford
18	Kyle Busch	Joe Gibbs Racing	Toyota
19	Martin Truex Jr.	Joe Gibbs Racing	Toyota
20	Erik Jones	Joe Gibbs Racing	Toyota
21	Matt DiBenedetto	Wood Brothers Racing	Ford
22	Joey Logano	Team Penske	Ford
24	William Byron	Hendrick Motorsports	Chevrolet
27	Gray Gaulding	Rick Ware Racing	Ford
32	Corey LaJoie	Go Fas Racing	Ford
34	Michael McDowell	Front Row Motorsports	Ford
37	Ryan Preece	JTG Daugherty Racing	Chevrolet
38	John Hunter Nemechek (R)	Front Row Motorsports	Ford
41	Cole Custer (R)	Stewart-Haas Racing	Ford
42	Matt Kenseth	Chip Ganassi Racing	Chevrolet
43	Bubba Wallace	Richard Petty Motorsports	Chevrolet
47	Ricky Stenhouse Jr.	JTG Daugherty Racing	Chevrolet
48	Jimmie Johnson	Hendrick Motorsports	Chevrolet
51	Joey Gase (i)	Petty Ware Racing	Ford
53	Garrett Smithley	Rick Ware Racing	Chevrolet
66	Timmy Hill (i)	MBM Motorsports	Toyota
77	J. J. Yeley (i)	Spire Motorsports	Chevrolet
78	B. J. McLeod (i)	B. J. McLeod Motorsports	Chevrolet
88	Alex Bowman	Hendrick Motorsports	Chevrolet
95	Christopher Bell (R)	Leavine Family Racing	Toyota
96	Daniel Suárez	Gaunt Brothers Racing	Toyota
Official entry list

== Qualifying ==
Under modified operational procedures, no qualifying sessions were held for this race. The starting order was determined by the results of The Real Heroes 400, but with the order of the top 20 inverted.

=== Starting Lineup ===
Pos	No.	Driver	Team	Manufacturer
1	37	Ryan Preece	JTG Daugherty Racing	Chevrolet
2	13	Ty Dillon	Germain Racing	Chevrolet
3	22	Joey Logano	Team Penske	Ford
4	14	Clint Bowyer	Stewart-Haas Racing	Ford
5	12	Ryan Blaney	Team Penske	Ford
6	6	Ryan Newman	Roush Fenway Racing	Ford
7	21	Matt DiBenedetto	Wood Brothers Racing	Ford
8	2	Brad Keselowski	Team Penske	Ford
9	10	Aric Almirola	Stewart-Haas Racing	Ford
10	3	Austin Dillon	Richard Childress Racing	Chevrolet
11	42	Matt Kenseth	Chip Ganassi Racing	Chevrolet
12	38	John Hunter Nemechek (R)	Front Row Motorsports	Ford
13	20	Erik Jones	Joe Gibbs Racing	Toyota
14	8	Tyler Reddick (R)	Richard Childress Racing	Chevrolet
15	19	Martin Truex Jr.	Joe Gibbs Racing	Toyota
16	11	Denny Hamlin	Joe Gibbs Racing	Toyota
17	9	Chase Elliott	Hendrick Motorsports	Chevrolet
18	1	Kurt Busch	Chip Ganassi Racing	Chevrolet
19	88	Alex Bowman	Hendrick Motorsports	Chevrolet
20	4	Kevin Harvick	Stewart-Haas Racing	Ford
21	43	Bubba Wallace	Richard Petty Motorsports	Chevrolet
22	41	Cole Custer (R)	Stewart-Haas Racing	Ford
23	34	Michael McDowell	Front Row Motorsports	Ford
24	95	Christopher Bell (R)	Leavine Family Racing	Toyota
25	96	Daniel Suárez	Gaunt Brothers Racing	Toyota
26	18	Kyle Busch	Joe Gibbs Racing	Toyota
27	15	Brennan Poole (R)	Premium Motorsports	Chevrolet
28	27	Gray Gaulding	Rick Ware Racing	Ford
29	77	J. J. Yeley (i)	Spire Motorsports	Chevrolet
30	51	Joey Gase (i)	Petty Ware Racing	Ford
31	32	Corey LaJoie	Go Fas Racing	Ford
32	17	Chris Buescher	Roush Fenway Racing	Ford
33	66	Timmy Hill (i)	MBM Motorsports	Toyota
34	24	William Byron	Hendrick Motorsports	Chevrolet
35	00	Quin Houff (R)	StarCom Racing	Chevrolet
36	53	Garrett Smithley	Rick Ware Racing	Chevrolet
37	48	Jimmie Johnson	Hendrick Motorsports	Chevrolet
38	78	B. J. McLeod (i)	B. J. McLeod Motorsports	Chevrolet
39	47	Ricky Stenhouse Jr.	JTG Daugherty Racing	Chevrolet
Official starting lineup

== Race ==
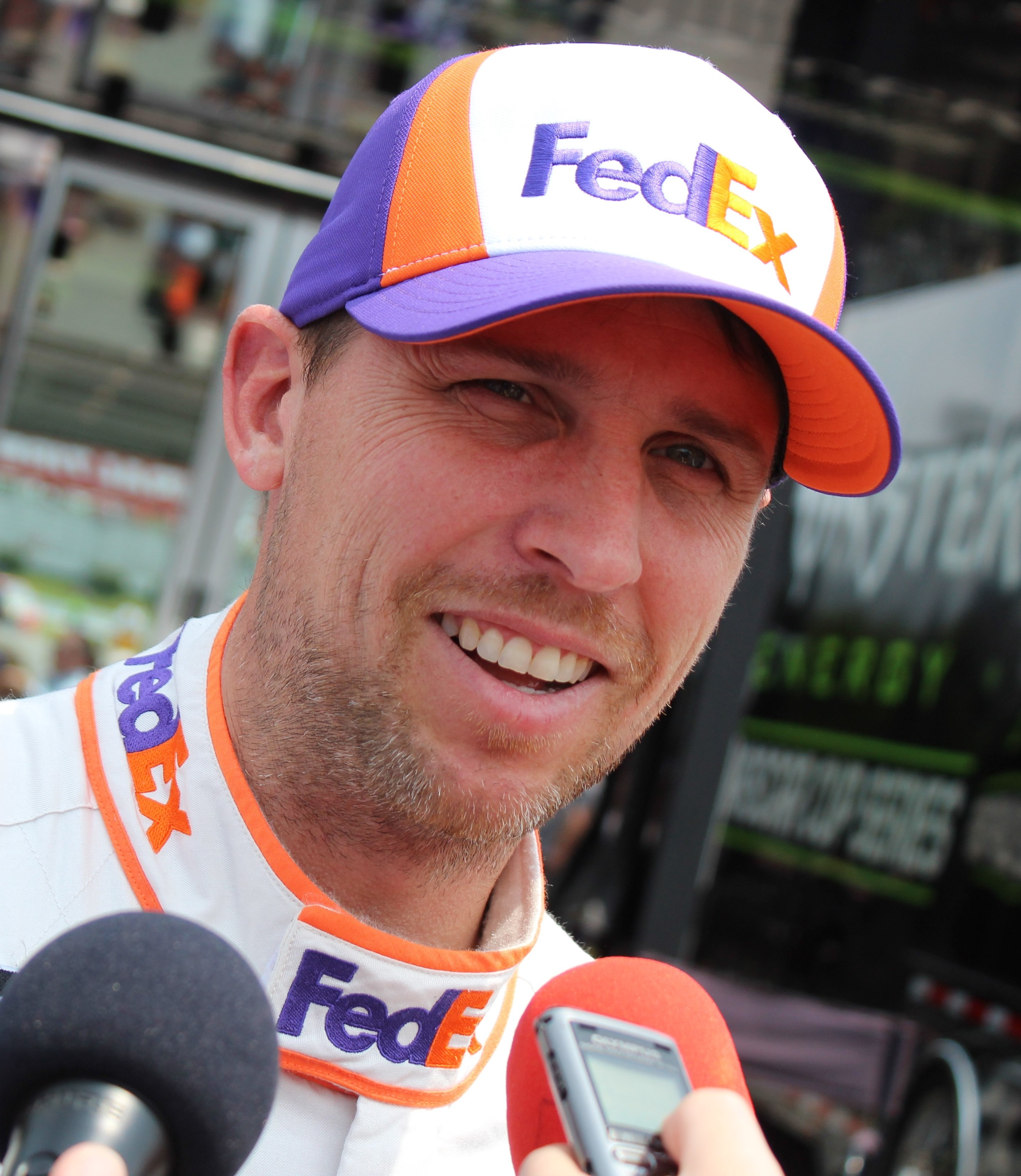
Denny Hamlin was declared the winner after rain shortened the race to 208 laps.

=== Stage Results ===
Stage One Laps: 60

Pos	No	Driver	Team	Manufacturer	Points
1	14	Clint Bowyer	Stewart-Haas Racing	Ford	10
2	19	Martin Truex Jr.	Joe Gibbs Racing	Toyota	9
3	12	Ryan Blaney	Team Penske	Ford	8
4	88	Alex Bowman	Hendrick Motorsports	Chevrolet	7
5	22	Joey Logano	Team Penske	Ford	6
6	10	Aric Almirola	Stewart-Haas Racing	Ford	5
7	9	Chase Elliott	Hendrick Motorsports	Chevrolet	4
8	11	Denny Hamlin	Joe Gibbs Racing	Toyota	3
9	42	Matt Kenseth	Chip Ganassi Racing	Chevrolet	2
10	37	Ryan Preece	JTG Daugherty Racing	Chevrolet	1
Official stage one results

Stage Two Laps: 65

Pos	No	Driver	Team	Manufacturer	Points
1	14	Clint Bowyer	Stewart-Haas Racing	Ford	10
2	9	Chase Elliott	Hendrick Motorsports	Chevrolet	9
3	19	Martin Truex Jr.	Joe Gibbs Racing	Toyota	8
4	20	Erik Jones	Joe Gibbs Racing	Toyota	7
5	4	Kevin Harvick	Stewart-Haas Racing	Ford	6
6	24	William Byron	Hendrick Motorsports	Chevrolet	5
7	11	Denny Hamlin	Joe Gibbs Racing	Toyota	4
8	88	Alex Bowman	Hendrick Motorsports	Chevrolet	3
9	22	Joey Logano	Team Penske	Ford	2
10	21	Matt DiBenedetto	Wood Brothers Racing	Ford	1
Official stage two results

=== Final Stage Results ===
Final Stage Laps: 83

Pos	Grid	No	Driver	Team	Manufacturer	Laps	Points
1	16	11	Denny Hamlin	Joe Gibbs Racing	Toyota	208	47
2	26	18	Kyle Busch	Joe Gibbs Racing	Toyota	208	35
3	20	4	Kevin Harvick	Stewart-Haas Racing	Ford	208	40
4	8	2	Brad Keselowski	Team Penske	Ford	208	33
5	13	20	Erik Jones	Joe Gibbs Racing	Toyota	208	39
6	3	22	Joey Logano	Team Penske	Ford	208	39
7	9	10	Aric Almirola	Stewart-Haas Racing	Ford	208	35
8	37	48	Jimmie Johnson	Hendrick Motorsports	Chevrolet	208	29
9	7	21	Matt DiBenedetto	Wood Brothers Racing	Ford	208	29
10	15	19	Martin Truex Jr.	Joe Gibbs Racing	Toyota	208	44
11	24	95	Christopher Bell (R)	Leavine Family Racing	Toyota	208	26
12	34	24	William Byron	Hendrick Motorsports	Chevrolet	208	30
13	14	8	Tyler Reddick (R)	Richard Childress Racing	Chevrolet	208	24
14	6	6	Ryan Newman	Roush Fenway Racing	Ford	208	23
15	18	1	Kurt Busch	Chip Ganassi Racing	Chevrolet	208	22
16	21	43	Bubba Wallace	Richard Petty Motorsports	Chevrolet	208	21
17	23	34	Michael McDowell	Front Row Motorsports	Ford	208	20
18	19	88	Alex Bowman	Hendrick Motorsports	Chevrolet	208	29
19	2	13	Ty Dillon	Germain Racing	Chevrolet	208	18
20	10	3	Austin Dillon	Richard Childress Racing	Chevrolet	208	17
21	5	12	Ryan Blaney	Team Penske	Ford	208	24
22	4	14	Clint Bowyer	Stewart-Haas Racing	Ford	208	35
23	32	17	Chris Buescher	Roush Fenway Racing	Ford	208	14
24	31	32	Corey LaJoie	Go Fas Racing	Ford	207	13
25	39	47	Ricky Stenhouse Jr.	JTG Daugherty Racing	Chevrolet	207	12
26	35	00	Quin Houff (R)	StarCom Racing	Chevrolet	207	11
27	25	96	Daniel Suárez	Gaunt Brothers Racing	Toyota	207	10
28	29	77	J. J. Yeley (i)	Spire Motorsports	Chevrolet	207	0
29	30	51	Joey Gase (i)	Petty Ware Racing	Ford	207	0
30	11	42	Matt Kenseth	Chip Ganassi Racing	Chevrolet	206	9
31	22	41	Cole Custer (R)	Stewart-Haas Racing	Ford	206	6
32	28	27	Gray Gaulding	Rick Ware Racing	Ford	206	5
33	33	66	Timmy Hill (i)	MBM Motorsports	Toyota	204	0
34	36	53	Garrett Smithley	Rick Ware Racing	Chevrolet	204	3
35	12	38	John Hunter Nemechek (R)	Front Row Motorsports	Ford	202	2
36	38	78	B. J. McLeod (i)	B. J. McLeod Motorsports	Chevrolet	202	0
37	27	15	Brennan Poole (R)	Premium Motorsports	Chevrolet	201	1
38	17	9	Chase Elliott	Hendrick Motorsports	Chevrolet	200	14
39	1	37	Ryan Preece	JTG Daugherty Racing	Chevrolet	69	2
Official race results

=== Race statistics ===
- Lead changes: 17 among 13 different drivers
- Cautions/Laps: 11 for 54
- Red flags: 1
- Time of race: 2 hours, 42 minutes and 23 seconds
- Average speed: 104.984 miles per hour (168.955 km/h) It was the slowest hardtop race since the 1958 Southern 500.

== Media ==
=== Television ===
The Toyota 500 was carried by FS1 in the United States. Mike Joy and five-time Darlington winner Jeff Gordon covered the race from the Fox Sports studio in Charlotte. Matt Yocum handled the pit road duties. Larry McReynolds provided insight from the Fox Sports studio in Charlotte.

FS1
Booth announcers	Pit reporter	In-race analyst
Lap-by-lap: Mike Joy; Color-commentator: Jeff Gordon	Matt Yocum	Larry McReynolds

=== Radio ===
The Motor Racing Network (MRN) called the race for radio, which was simulcast on Sirius XM NASCAR Radio. Alex Hayden and Dave Moody called the action for MRN when the field raced down the front stretch. Dillon Welch called the race from a Billboard outside of turn 1 when the field raced through turns 1 and 2, and Steve Post called the race atop of the Darlington Raceway Club outside of turn 3 when the field raced through turns 3 and 4. Kim Coon and Hannah Newhouse called the action on pit road for MRN.

MRN
Booth announcers	Turn announcers	Pit reporters
Lead announcer: Alex Hayden; Announcer: Dave Moody	Turns 1 & 2: Dillon Welch; Turns 3 & 4: Steve Post	Kim Coon; Hannah Newhouse

== Standings after the race ==
Drivers' Championship standings

	Pos	Driver	Points
	1	Kevin Harvick	258
1	2	Joey Logano	224 (–34)
1	3	Alex Bowman	219 (–39)
2	4	Denny Hamlin	201 (–57)
1	5	Chase Elliott	192 (–66)
1	6	Brad Keselowski	191 (–67)
	7	Aric Almirola	186 (–72)
3	8	Martin Truex Jr.	179 (–79)
	9	Matt DiBenedetto	170 (–88)
	10	Clint Bowyer	170 (–88)
3	11	Ryan Blaney	168 (–90)
	12	Jimmie Johnson	161 (–97)
1	13	Kyle Busch	157 (–101)
1	14	Kurt Busch	151 (–107)
2	15	Erik Jones	146 (–112)
	16	William Byron	129 (–129)
Official driver's standings

Manufacturers' Championship standings

	Pos	Manufacturer	Points
	1	Ford	221
1	2	Toyota	203 (–18)
1	3	Chevrolet	201 (–21)

- Note: Only the first 16 positions are included for the driver standings.

Previous race: 2020 The Real Heroes 400	NASCAR Cup Series; 2020 season	Next race: 2020 Coca-Cola 600
