= 2020 The Real Heroes 400 =

NASCAR Cup Series race

Race details
- Race 5 of 36 in the 2020 NASCAR Cup Series
- Date: May 17, 2020
- Location: Darlington Raceway in Darlington, South Carolina
- Course: Permanent racing facility
- Course length: 1.366 miles (2.198 km)
- Distance: 293 laps, 400.238 mi (644.12 km)
- Average speed: 115.815 miles per hour (186.386 km/h)
- Attendance: 0 (behind closed doors)

Pole position
Driver	Brad Keselowski	Team Penske
- Grid positions set by ballot

Most laps led
Driver	Kevin Harvick	Stewart-Haas Racing
- Laps: 159

Winner
No. 4	Kevin Harvick	Stewart-Haas Racing

Television in the United States
- Network: Fox
- Announcers: Mike Joy and Jeff Gordon
- Nielsen ratings: 6.323 million

Radio in the United States
- Radio: MRN
- Booth announcers: Alex Hayden and Dave Moody
- Turn announcers: Dillon Welch (1 & 2) and Steve Post (3 & 4)

The 2020 The Real Heroes 400 was a NASCAR Cup Series race held on May 17, 2020, at Darlington Raceway in Darlington, South Carolina, replacing Chicagoland Speedway event. Contested over 293 laps on the 1.366-mile (2.198 km) egg-shaped oval, it was the fifth race of the 2020 NASCAR Cup Series season. It was the first Darlington event held in the spring since 2014, and the first major sporting event in the United States since COVID-19 was declared a pandemic.

== Report ==
=== Background ===
Layout of Darlington Raceway, the track where the race is held.

The 56th edition of this race, last held in 2004, was the first of the NASCAR Cup Series season following a hiatus brought on by the COVID-19 pandemic in the United States, beginning with the postponement of the Atlanta Motor Speedway race weekend on March 13, 2020, and subsequent postponement of all races through at least early-May. On April 30, 2020, NASCAR announced the resumption of races with twin races at Darlington, including a 400-mile race on May 17, 2020 and a 310-mile (500 kilometer) race the following Wednesday, May 20, 2020. All races will be held behind closed doors with only essential staff present, guidelines for social distancing and use of protective equipment by team staff, and logging to help with contact tracing efforts.

On May 14, 2020, NASCAR announced that the May 17 race would be branded as The Real Heroes 400, the naming was in support of The Real Heroes Project—a collaboration of major U.S. sports leagues to honor health care professionals working during the pandemic. As part of the initiative, the names of drivers printed above the cars' driver-side windows were replaced with the names of health care professionals (determined in collaboration with local Fox affiliates). The selected workers collectively served as Grand Marshals of the race via a video "mosaic".

Ryan Newman returned to racing, having recovered from injuries sustained after the final lap crash of the 2020 Daytona 500. Matt Kenseth made his return to the series, having been named the new driver of the Chip Ganassi Racing No. 42 Chevrolet, after the suspension and firing of Kyle Larson.

==== Entry list ====
- (R) denotes rookie driver.
- (i) denotes driver who are ineligible for series driver points.

No.	Driver	Team	Manufacturer
00	Quin Houff (R)	StarCom Racing	Chevrolet
1	Kurt Busch	Chip Ganassi Racing	Chevrolet
2	Brad Keselowski	Team Penske	Ford
3	Austin Dillon	Richard Childress Racing	Chevrolet
4	Kevin Harvick	Stewart-Haas Racing	Ford
6	Ryan Newman	Roush Fenway Racing	Ford
7	Josh Bilicki (i)	Tommy Baldwin Racing	Chevrolet
8	Tyler Reddick (R)	Richard Childress Racing	Chevrolet
9	Chase Elliott	Hendrick Motorsports	Chevrolet
10	Aric Almirola	Stewart-Haas Racing	Ford
11	Denny Hamlin	Joe Gibbs Racing	Toyota
12	Ryan Blaney	Team Penske	Ford
13	Ty Dillon	Germain Racing	Chevrolet
14	Clint Bowyer	Stewart-Haas Racing	Ford
15	Brennan Poole (R)	Premium Motorsports	Chevrolet
17	Chris Buescher	Roush Fenway Racing	Ford
18	Kyle Busch	Joe Gibbs Racing	Toyota
19	Martin Truex Jr.	Joe Gibbs Racing	Toyota
20	Erik Jones	Joe Gibbs Racing	Toyota
21	Matt DiBenedetto	Wood Brothers Racing	Ford
22	Joey Logano	Team Penske	Ford
24	William Byron	Hendrick Motorsports	Chevrolet
27	J. J. Yeley (i)	Rick Ware Racing	Ford
32	Corey LaJoie	Go Fas Racing	Ford
34	Michael McDowell	Front Row Motorsports	Ford
37	Ryan Preece	JTG Daugherty Racing	Chevrolet
38	John Hunter Nemechek (R)	Front Row Motorsports	Ford
41	Cole Custer (R)	Stewart-Haas Racing	Ford
42	Matt Kenseth	Chip Ganassi Racing	Chevrolet
43	Bubba Wallace	Richard Petty Motorsports	Chevrolet
47	Ricky Stenhouse Jr.	JTG Daugherty Racing	Chevrolet
48	Jimmie Johnson	Hendrick Motorsports	Chevrolet
51	Joey Gase (i)	Petty Ware Racing	Ford
53	Garrett Smithley	Rick Ware Racing	Chevrolet
66	Timmy Hill (i)	MBM Motorsports	Toyota
77	Reed Sorenson	Spire Motorsports	Chevrolet
78	B. J. McLeod (i)	B. J. McLeod Motorsports	Chevrolet
88	Alex Bowman	Hendrick Motorsports	Chevrolet
95	Christopher Bell (R)	Leavine Family Racing	Toyota
96	Daniel Suárez	Gaunt Brothers Racing	Toyota
Official entry list

- Brennan Poole competed under Premium Motorsports banner but the team is now owned by Rick Ware (also owner of the Rick Ware Racing).

== Qualifying ==
Under modified operational procedures, no qualifying sessions were held for this race. The starting order was determined by a random draw, with drivers grouped into pots of positions based on segments of the owners' points standings going into the race.

=== Starting Lineup ===
Pos	No.	Driver	Team	Manufacturer
1	2	Brad Keselowski	Team Penske	Ford
2	88	Alex Bowman	Hendrick Motorsports	Chevrolet
3	21	Matt DiBenedetto	Wood Brothers Racing	Ford
4	18	Kyle Busch	Joe Gibbs Racing	Toyota
5	10	Aric Almirola	Stewart-Haas Racing	Ford
6	4	Kevin Harvick	Stewart-Haas Racing	Ford
7	12	Ryan Blaney	Team Penske	Ford
8	48	Jimmie Johnson	Hendrick Motorsports	Chevrolet
9	22	Joey Logano	Team Penske	Ford
10	11	Denny Hamlin	Joe Gibbs Racing	Toyota
11	9	Chase Elliott	Hendrick Motorsports	Chevrolet
12	42	Matt Kenseth	Chip Ganassi Racing	Chevrolet
13	14	Clint Bowyer	Stewart-Haas Racing	Ford
14	41	Cole Custer (R)	Stewart-Haas Racing	Ford
15	19	Martin Truex Jr.	Joe Gibbs Racing	Toyota
16	3	Austin Dillon	Richard Childress Racing	Chevrolet
17	43	Bubba Wallace	Richard Petty Motorsports	Chevrolet
18	24	William Byron	Hendrick Motorsports	Chevrolet
19	32	Corey LaJoie	Go Fas Racing	Ford
20	20	Erik Jones	Joe Gibbs Racing	Toyota
21	6	Ryan Newman	Roush Fenway Racing	Ford
22	1	Kurt Busch	Chip Ganassi Racing	Chevrolet
23	47	Ricky Stenhouse Jr.	JTG Daugherty Racing	Chevrolet
24	17	Chris Buescher	Roush Fenway Racing	Ford
25	37	Ryan Preece	JTG Daugherty Racing	Chevrolet
26	53	Garrett Smithley	Rick Ware Racing	Chevrolet
27	00	Quin Houff (R)	StarCom Racing	Chevrolet
28	95	Christopher Bell (R)	Leavine Family Racing	Toyota
29	8	Tyler Reddick (R)	Richard Childress Racing	Chevrolet
30	27	J. J. Yeley (i)	Rick Ware Racing	Ford
31	34	Michael McDowell	Front Row Motorsports	Ford
32	51	Joey Gase (i)	Petty Ware Racing	Ford
33	13	Ty Dillon	Germain Racing	Chevrolet
34	38	John Hunter Nemechek (R)	Front Row Motorsports	Ford
35	15	Brennan Poole (R)	Premium Motorsports	Chevrolet
36	77	Reed Sorenson	Spire Motorsports	Chevrolet
37	96	Daniel Suárez	Gaunt Brothers Racing	Toyota
38	66	Timmy Hill (i)	MBM Motorsports	Toyota
39	78	B. J. McLeod (i)	B. J. McLeod Motorsports	Chevrolet
40	7	Josh Bilicki (i)	Tommy Baldwin Racing	Chevrolet
Official starting lineup

== Race ==
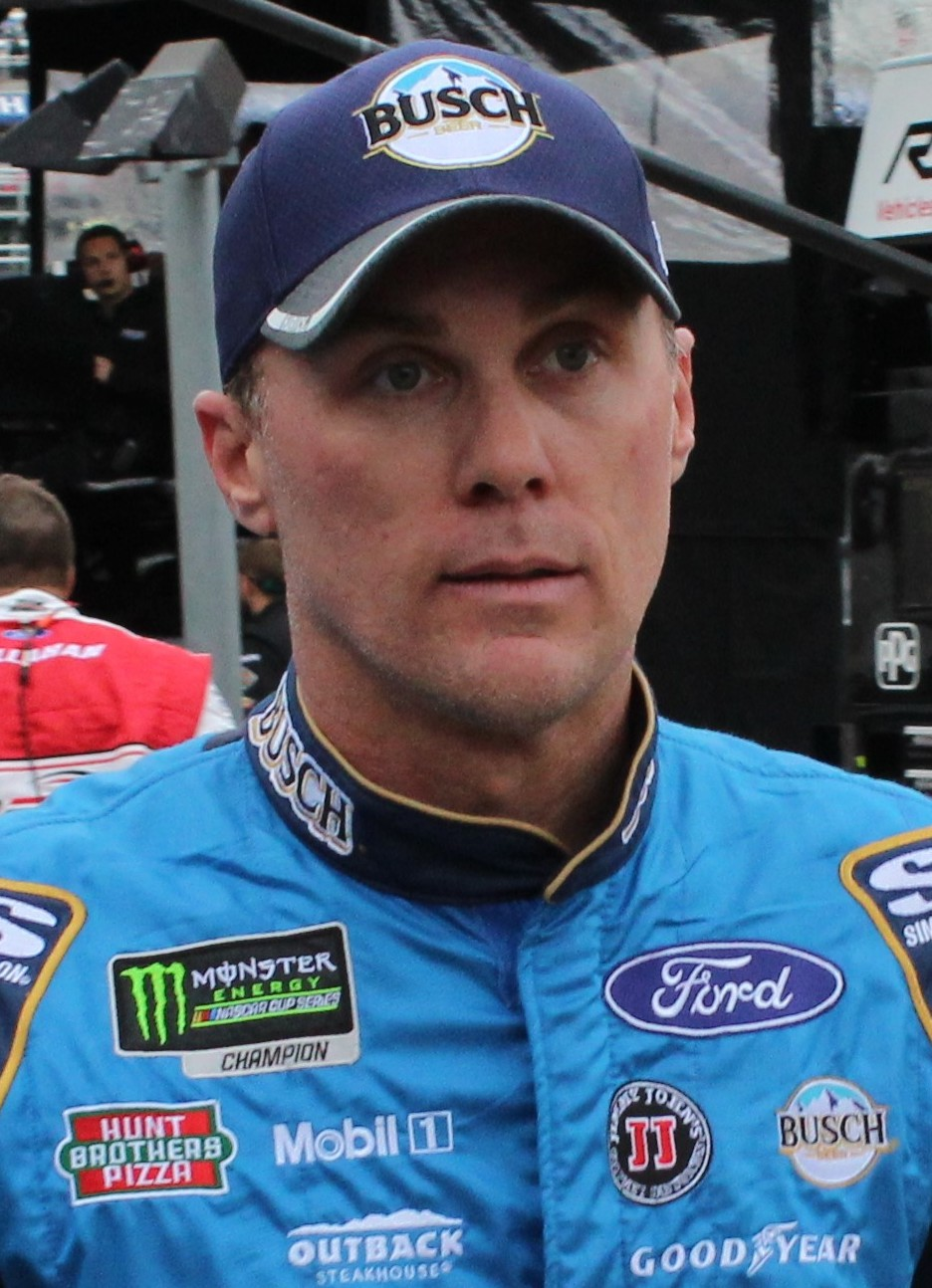
Kevin Harvick won the race.

=== Stage Results ===
Stage One Laps: 90

Pos	No	Driver	Team	Manufacturer	Points
1	24	William Byron	Hendrick Motorsports	Chevrolet	10
2	11	Denny Hamlin	Joe Gibbs Racing	Toyota	9
3	88	Alex Bowman	Hendrick Motorsports	Chevrolet	8
4	4	Kevin Harvick	Stewart-Haas Racing	Ford	7
5	2	Brad Keselowski	Team Penske	Ford	6
6	10	Aric Almirola	Stewart-Haas Racing	Ford	5
7	14	Clint Bowyer	Stewart-Haas Racing	Ford	4
8	8	Tyler Reddick (R)	Richard Childress Racing	Chevrolet	3
9	6	Ryan Newman	Roush Fenway Racing	Ford	2
10	9	Chase Elliott	Hendrick Motorsports	Chevrolet	1
Official stage one results

Stage Two Laps: 95

Pos	No	Driver	Team	Manufacturer	Points
1	2	Brad Keselowski	Team Penske	Ford	10
2	88	Alex Bowman	Hendrick Motorsports	Chevrolet	9
3	19	Martin Truex Jr.	Joe Gibbs Racing	Toyota	8
4	4	Kevin Harvick	Stewart-Haas Racing	Ford	7
5	14	Clint Bowyer	Stewart-Haas Racing	Ford	6
6	1	Kurt Busch	Chip Ganassi Racing	Chevrolet	5
7	37	Ryan Preece	JTG Daugherty Racing	Chevrolet	4
8	22	Joey Logano	Team Penske	Ford	3
9	11	Denny Hamlin	Joe Gibbs Racing	Toyota	2
10	20	Erik Jones	Joe Gibbs Racing	Toyota	1
Official stage two results

=== Final Stage Results ===
Stage Three Laps: 108

Pos	Grid	No	Driver	Team	Manufacturer	Laps	Points
1	6	4	Kevin Harvick	Stewart-Haas Racing	Ford	293	54
2	2	88	Alex Bowman	Hendrick Motorsports	Chevrolet	293	52
3	22	1	Kurt Busch	Chip Ganassi Racing	Chevrolet	293	39
4	11	9	Chase Elliott	Hendrick Motorsports	Chevrolet	293	34
5	10	11	Denny Hamlin	Joe Gibbs Racing	Toyota	293	43
6	15	19	Martin Truex Jr.	Joe Gibbs Racing	Toyota	293	39
7	29	8	Tyler Reddick (R)	Richard Childress Racing	Chevrolet	293	33
8	20	20	Erik Jones	Joe Gibbs Racing	Toyota	293	30
9	34	38	John Hunter Nemechek (R)	Front Row Motorsports	Ford	293	28
10	12	42	Matt Kenseth	Chip Ganassi Racing	Chevrolet	293	27
11	16	3	Austin Dillon	Richard Childress Racing	Chevrolet	293	26
12	5	10	Aric Almirola	Stewart-Haas Racing	Ford	293	30
13	1	2	Brad Keselowski	Team Penske	Ford	293	40
14	3	21	Matt DiBenedetto	Wood Brothers Racing	Ford	293	23
15	21	6	Ryan Newman	Roush Fenway Racing	Ford	293	24
16	7	12	Ryan Blaney	Team Penske	Ford	293	21
17	13	14	Clint Bowyer	Stewart-Haas Racing	Ford	293	30
18	9	22	Joey Logano	Team Penske	Ford	293	22
19	33	13	Ty Dillon	Germain Racing	Chevrolet	293	18
20	25	37	Ryan Preece	JTG Daugherty Racing	Chevrolet	293	21
21	17	43	Bubba Wallace	Richard Petty Motorsports	Chevrolet	293	16
22	14	41	Cole Custer (R)	Stewart-Haas Racing	Ford	293	15
23	31	34	Michael McDowell	Front Row Motorsports	Ford	293	14
24	28	95	Christopher Bell (R)	Leavine Family Racing	Toyota	293	13
25	37	96	Daniel Suárez	Gaunt Brothers Racing	Toyota	292	12
26	4	18	Kyle Busch	Joe Gibbs Racing	Toyota	292	11
27	35	15	Brennan Poole (R)	Premium Motorsports	Chevrolet	292	10
28	30	27	J. J. Yeley (i)	Rick Ware Racing	Ford	291	0
29	36	77	Reed Sorenson	Spire Motorsports	Chevrolet	291	8
30	32	51	Joey Gase (i)	Petty Ware Racing	Ford	289	0
31	19	32	Corey LaJoie	Go Fas Racing	Ford	289	6
32	24	17	Chris Buescher	Roush Fenway Racing	Ford	287	5
33	38	66	Timmy Hill (i)	MBM Motorsports	Toyota	286	0
34	40	7	Josh Bilicki (i)	Tommy Baldwin Racing	Chevrolet	286	0
35	18	24	William Byron	Hendrick Motorsports	Chevrolet	279	12
36	27	00	Quin Houff (R)	StarCom Racing	Chevrolet	137	1
37	26	53	Garrett Smithley	Rick Ware Racing	Chevrolet	127	1
38	8	48	Jimmie Johnson	Hendrick Motorsports	Chevrolet	89	1
39	39	78	B. J. McLeod (i)	B. J. McLeod Motorsports	Chevrolet	13	0
40	23	47	Ricky Stenhouse Jr.	JTG Daugherty Racing	Chevrolet	0	1
Official race results

=== Race statistics ===
- Lead changes: 10 among 6 different drivers
- Cautions/Laps: 10 for 57
- Red flags: 0
- Time of race: 3 hours, 27 minutes and 21 seconds
- Average speed: 115.815 miles per hour (186.386 km/h)

== Media ==
=== Television ===
The Real Heroes 400 was carried by Fox in the United States. Mike Joy and seven-time Darlington winner Jeff Gordon called the race from the Fox Sports Studio in Charlotte. Regan Smith handled pit road duties. Larry McReynolds provided insight from the Fox Sports studio in Charlotte.

Fox
Booth announcers	Pit reporter	In-race analyst
Lap-by-lap: Mike Joy; Color-commentator: Jeff Gordon	Regan Smith	Larry McReynolds

=== Radio ===
The Motor Racing Network (MRN) called the race for radio, which was simulcast on Sirius XM NASCAR Radio. Alex Hayden and Dave Moody called the action for MRN when the field raced down the front stretch. Dillon Welch called the race from a Billboard outside of turn 1 when the field raced through turns 1 and 2, and Steve Post called the race atop of the Darlington Raceway Club outside of turn 3 when the field raced through turns 3 and 4. Kim Coon and Hannah Newhouse called the action on pit road for MRN.

MRN
Booth announcers	Turn announcers	Pit reporters
Lead announcer: Alex Hayden; Announcer: Dave Moody	Turns 1 & 2: Dillon Welch; Turns 3 & 4: Steve Post	Kim Coon; Hannah Newhouse

== Standings after the race ==
Drivers' Championship standings

	Pos	Driver	Points
	1	Kevin Harvick	218
2	2	Alex Bowman	190 (−28)
1	3	Joey Logano	185 (−33)
1	4	Chase Elliott	178 (−40)
5	5	Brad Keselowski	158 (−60)
5	6	Denny Hamlin	154 (−64)
1	7	Aric Almirola	151 (−67)
2	8	Ryan Blaney	144 (−74)
	9	Matt DiBenedetto	141 (−77)
4	10	Clint Bowyer	135 (−83)
4	11	Martin Truex Jr.	135 (−83)
7	12	Jimmie Johnson	132 (−86)
3	13	Kurt Busch	129 (−89)
2	14	Kyle Busch	122 (−96)
8	15	Kyle Larson	121 (−97)
2	16	Chris Buescher	107 (−111)
Official driver's standings

Manufacturers' Championship standings

Pos	Manufacturer	Points
1	Ford	187
2	Chevrolet	172 (−15)
3	Toyota	163 (−24)

- Note: Only the first 16 positions are included for the driver standings.

Previous race: 2020 FanShield 500	NASCAR Cup Series; 2020 season	Next race: 2020 Toyota 500
