= B. J. McLeod Motorsports =

American auto race team

- Owner(s): B. J. McLeod; Jessica Smith-McLeod
- Base: Mooresville, North Carolina
- Series: NASCAR Xfinity Series
- Race drivers: Xfinity Series: 78. B. J. McLeod (part-time)
- Manufacturer: Chevrolet
- Opened: 2011
- Closed: 2024

Career
- Debut: Cup Series: 2020 The Real Heroes 400 (Darlington); Xfinity Series: 2016 PowerShares QQQ 300 (Daytona); Camping World Truck Series: 2011 Lucas Deep Clean 200 (Nashville)
- Latest race: Cup Series: 2021 Buschy McBusch Race 400 (Kansas); Xfinity Series: 2024 Call811.com Every Dig. Every Time. 200 (Phoenix); Camping World Truck Series: 2015 Rhino Linings 350 (Las Vegas)
- Races competed: Total: 303; Cup Series: 16; Xfinity Series: 266; Camping World Truck Series: 21
- Drivers' Championships: Total: 0 Cup Series: 0 Xfinity Series: 0 Camping World Truck Series: 0
- Race victories: Total: 0 Cup Series: 0 Xfinity Series: 0 Camping World Truck Series: 0
- Pole positions: Total: 0 Cup Series: 0 Xfinity Series: 0 Camping World Truck Series: 0

B. J. McLeod Motorsports was an American professional stock car racing team that last competed part-time in the NASCAR Xfinity Series. The team is owned by B. J. McLeod and his wife, Jessica. The team last fielded the No. 78 part-time for B. J. McLeod.

== Founding ==
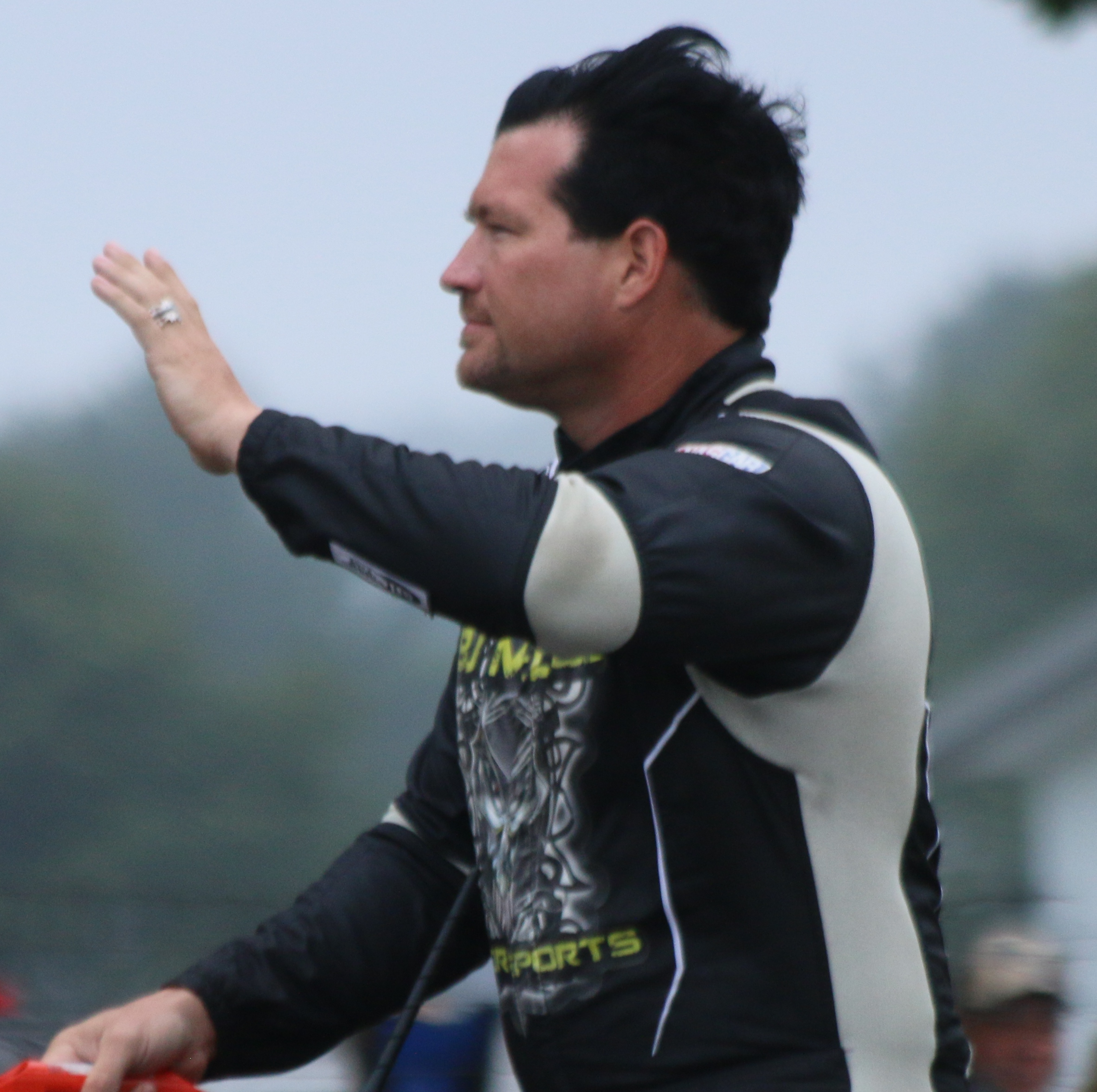
B. J. McLeod

On February 3, 2016, team owner B. J. McLeod said that the team fielded two full-time cars, including the No. 78 Ford Mustang driven by himself. Batteries Plus Bulbs sponsored the car for three races in 2016.

On October 23, 2020, McLeod and Matt Tifft purchased Archie St. Hilare's half of Go Fas Racing's charter. McLeod, Tifft, and Joe Falk used the charter to form Live Fast Motorsports as a full-time Cup team in 2021. Although McLeod became Live Fast's driver, B. J. McLeod Motorsports continued to operate as an Xfinity team. On April 26, 2021, the team returned with the 55 with fellow Xfinity driver Matt Mills.

== Cup Series ==
=== Car No. 55 history ===
Although Live Fast Motorsports replaced the team's Cup operations, the team announced that they would return to compete in the Buschy McBusch Race 400 at Kansas Speedway with the team's Xfinity Series driver, Matt Mills. The team would be renumbered to the No. 55 due to Live Fast Motorsports bearing the No. 78. Mills finished 38th, 12 laps down.

==== Car No. 55 results ====
Year	Driver	No.	Make	1	2	3	4	5	6	7	8	9	10	11	12	13	14	15	16	17	18	19	20	21	22	23	24	25	26	27	28	29	30	31	32	33	34	35	36	NCSC	Pts	Ref
2021	Matt Mills	55	Ford	DAY	DAY	HOM	LVS	PHO	ATL	BRI	MAR	RCH	TAL	KAN; 38	DAR	DOV	COA	CLT	SON	NSH	POC	POC	ROA	ATL	NHA	GLN	IND	MCH	DAY	DAR	RCH	BRI	LVS	TAL	CLT	TEX	KAN	MAR	PHO	44th	1	

=== Car No. 78 history ===
In 2020, it was announced that B. J. McLeod would make his first attempt in the NASCAR Cup Series at Darlington. B. J. McLeod would drive his own No. 78 Chevy to a 39th-place finish in the team's Cup debut. He improved to a 36th-place finish at the next race at Darlington. The No. 78 switched to a Ford for the next three races before running a Chevy again at Atlanta. The No. 78 skipped the next two races (Withdrawing from both events) and returned with Garrett Smithley behind the wheel at Talladega, where he scored a 34th-place finish. After that, B. J. McLeod returned to the No. 78 for the two Pocono races, and Indianapolis, where he scored a season-best 22nd-place finish.

The team's Cup operations were replaced by Live Fast Motorsports in 2021.

==== Car No. 78 results ====
Year	Driver	No.	Make	1	2	3	4	5	6	7	8	9	10	11	12	13	14	15	16	17	18	19	20	21	22	23	24	25	26	27	28	29	30	31	32	33	34	35	36	NCSC	Pts	Ref
2020	B. J. McLeod	78	Chevy	DAY	LVS	CAL	PHO	DAR; 39	DAR; 36				ATL; 40	MAR	HOM		POC; 39	POC; 37	IND; 22	KEN	TEX; 33	KAN; 39	NHA	MCH	MCH	DAY	DOV; 38	DOV; 31	DAY	DAR	RCH									41st	56	
2020	B. J. McLeod	78	Ford							CLT; 32	CLT; 35	BRI; 28																												41st	56	
2020	Garrett Smithley	78	Chevy													TAL; 34																BRI; 32	LVS	TAL	CLT	KAN	TEX	MAR	PHO	41st	56	

== Xfinity Series ==
=== Primary Car history ===
==== #78 (2016-2024) ====
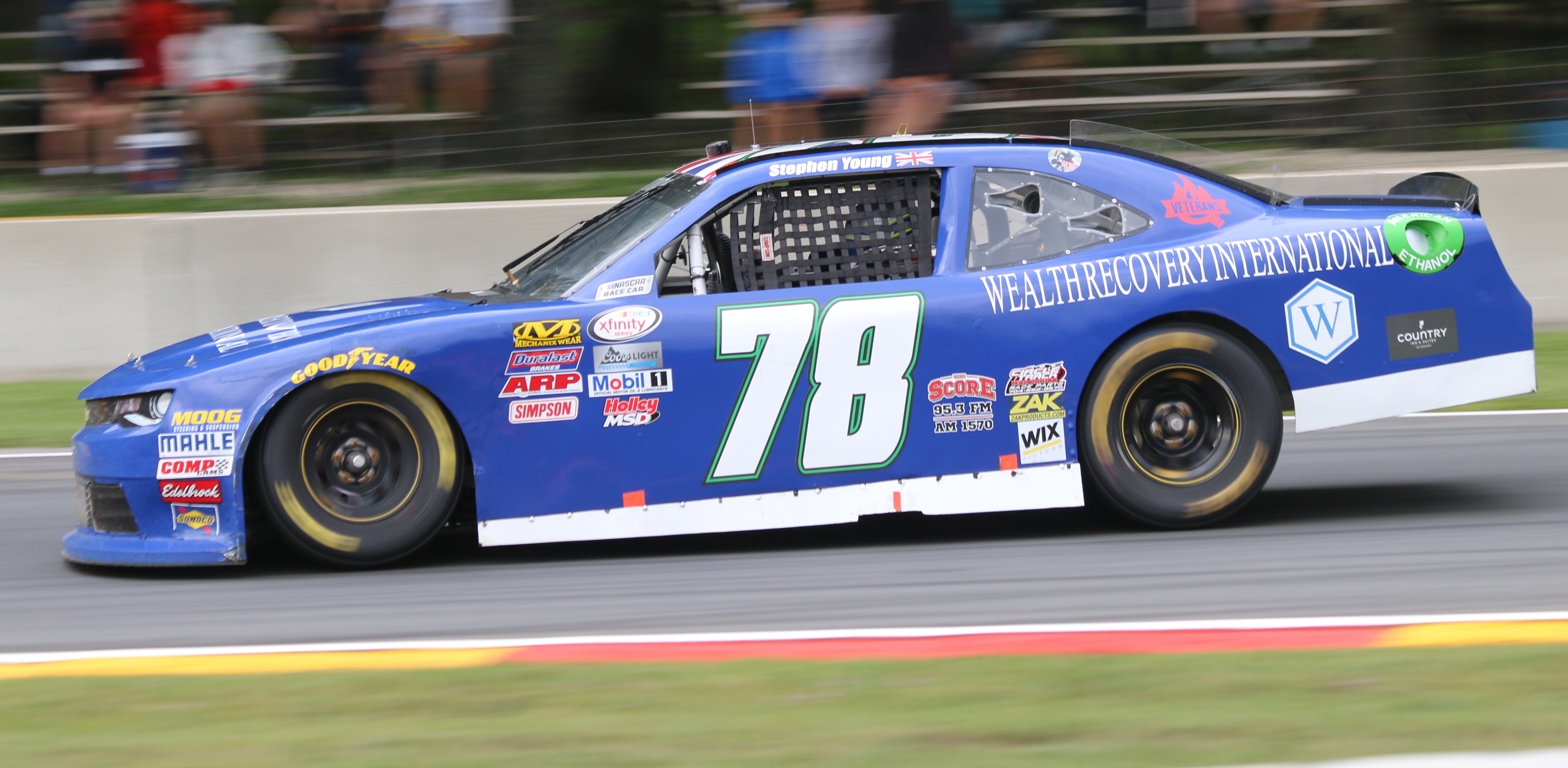
Stephen Young in the No. 78 car at Road America in 2017

Team owner McLeod drove this car as an owner-driver in 2016. He made the first ten races and scored one top twenty finish, a nineteenth at Dover International Speedway. McLeod also had two engine failures, at Auto Club and Talladega Superspeedway.

In 2017, the team returned with Clint King in the two first races of the season. McLeod returned at Las Vegas. At Charlotte Jeff Green went to the No. 78 for a one-race deal but failed to qualify. Jordan Anderson, Tommy Joe Martins, Angela Ruch, John Graham, Josh Bilicki and Jennifer Jo Cobb have driven the No. 78. Stephen Young drove the No. 78 at the road course races.

In 2018, the team returned once again with multiple drivers behind the wheel. Ryan Ellis, McLeod, Ray Black Jr., Tommy Joe Martins, Blake Jones, Scott Heckert, and Jairo Avila Jr. shared the car. Vinnie Miller took over the No. 78 car for the remainder of the 2018 season and a full schedule in 2019 and 2020, although he was replaced at Mid-Ohio with Scott Heckert.

In 2021, Jesse Little would drive the No. 78 car for the majority of the season while Ellis, Andy Lally, Mason Massey, Stefan Parsons, Akinori Ogata, and Sheldon Creed shared the ride.

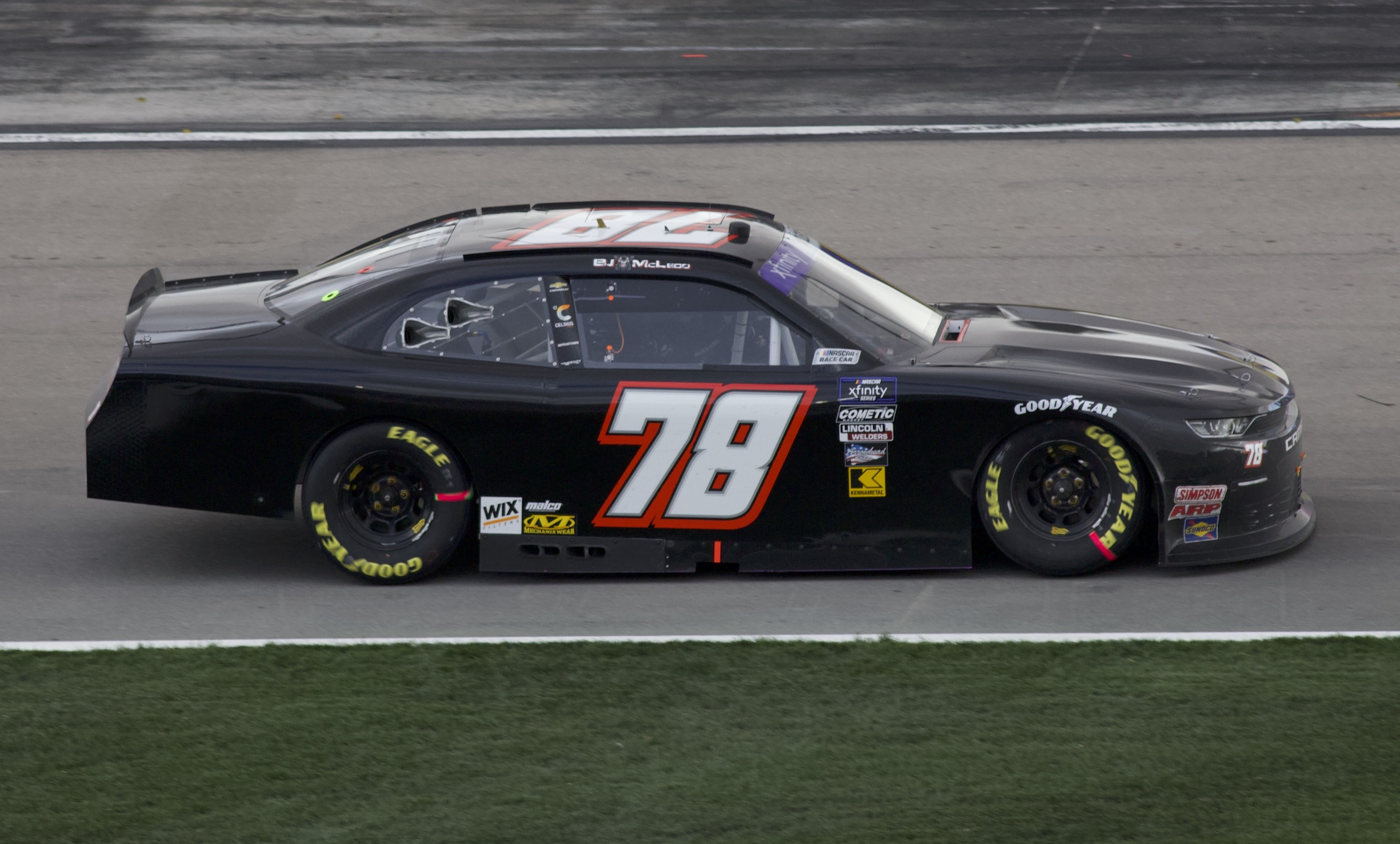
B.J. McLeod in the No. 78 car at Las Vegas in 2024.

In 2022, Josh Williams would drive the No. 78 full-time. After Indy Road Course Williams left the team and he was replaced by multiple drivers such as Mills, Heckert, Brandon Brown, Parsons, McLeod, and Garrett Smithley.

In 2023, BJMM announced that Anthony Alfredo would join the team as the full-time driver in the No. 78 Chevrolet. Alfredo finished the season 24th in the points standings. On November 15, BJMM parted ways with Alfredo.

In 2024, although the team started the season with three top-20s through the first four races of the season, including two top-15s, BJMM announced early in the season that the team would scale back to a part-time schedule. The team sold its owns points to the No. 07 for SS-Green Light Racing and didn't attempt any races for the rest of the season.

==== Primary Car results ====
Year	Driver	No.	Make	1	2	3	4	5	6	7	8	9	10	11	12	13	14	15	16	17	18	19	20	21	22	23	24	25	26	27	28	29	30	31	32	33	Owners	Pts	Ref
2016	B. J. McLeod	78	Ford	DAY; 24	ATL; 26	LVS; 27	PHO; 29	CAL; 33	TEX; 29	BRI; 28	RCH; 28	TAL; 36	DOV; 19	CHA; 25	POC; 22	MCH; 34	IOW; 19	DAY; 40	KEN; 23	NHA; 20	IND; 26	IOW; 23	GLN; 26	MOH; 27	BRI; 19	ROA; 28	DAR; 37	RCH; 32	CHI; 24	KEN; 21	DOV; 33	CHA; 30	KAN; 22	TEX; 28	PHO; 25	HOM; 31	26th	459	
2017	Clint King	78	Chevy	DAY; 38	ATL; 35																																38th	222	
2017	Jeff Green	78	Chevy										CLT; DNQ																								38th	222	
2017	Jordan Anderson	78	Chevy											DOV; 26																							38th	222	
2017	Tommy Joe Martins	78	Chevy												POC; 29	MCH; 28	IOW; 11			NHA; 29	IND; 26	IOW; 27			BRI; 33		DAR; 31										38th	222	
2017	Angela Ruch	78	Chevy																KEN; 30											KEN; 32		CLT; 36		TEX; 38			38th	222	
2017	Stephen Young	78	Chevy																				GLN; 28	MOH; 29		ROA; 12											38th	222	
2017	John Graham	78	Chevy																									RCH; 37							PHO; 31		38th	222	
2017	Josh Bilicki	78	Chevy																										CHI; 34		DOV; 30						38th	222	
2017	Jennifer Jo Cobb	78	Chevy																														KAN; 35				38th	222	
2017	B. J. McLeod	78	Chevy			LVS; 37	PHO; 25	CAL; 23	TEX; 27	BRI; 29	RCH; 37																									HOM; 33	38th	222	
2017	B. J. McLeod	78	Toyota									TAL; DNQ						DAY; 11																			38th	222	
2018	Ryan Ellis	78	Toyota	DAY; 30																																	25th	369	
2018	Ryan Ellis	78	Chevy																							ROA; 17											25th	369	
2018	B. J. McLeod	78	Chevy		ATL; 30	LVS; 26	PHO; 26	CAL; 22	TEX; 29	BRI; 20	RCH; 32		DOV; 23		POC; 22																						25th	369	
2018	B. J. McLeod	78	Toyota									TAL; 19																									25th	369	
2018	Tommy Joe Martins	78	Toyota																				GLN; 40														25th	369	
2018	Tommy Joe Martins	78	Chevy													MCH; 24	IOW; 32				NHA; 20	IOW; 21		MOH; 19				IND; 27									25th	369	
2018	Blake Jones	78	Chevy																	KEN; 25																	25th	369	
2018	Blake Jones	78	Toyota																DAY; 37																		25th	369	
2018	Ray Black Jr.	78	Chevy											CLT; 19																							25th	369	
2018	Scott Heckert	78	Chevy															CHI; 28																			25th	369	
2018	Jairo Avila Jr.	78	Chevy																						BRI; 20												25th	369	
2018	Cody Ware	78	Chevy																								DAR; 22										25th	369	
2018	Cole Rouse	78	Chevy																										LVS; 21								25th	369	
2018	Matt Mills	78	Chevy																											RCH; 27							25th	369	
2018	Vinnie Miller	78	Chevy																												CLT; 31	DOV; 25	KAN; 22	TEX; 27	PHO; 36	HOM; 40	25th	369	
2019	Vinnie Miller	78	Chevy		ATL; 32	LVS; 26	PHO; 23	CAL; 25	TEX; 25	BRI; 24	RCH; 27		DOV; 32	CLT; 23	POC; 25	MCH; 28	IOW; 32	CHI; 29		KEN; 25	NHA; 27	IOW; 20	GLN; 36		BRI; 21		DAR; 28	IND; 26	LVS; 30			DOV; 20	KAN; 30				28th	380	
2019	Vinnie Miller	78	Toyota	DAY; 25								TAL; 19							DAY; 11																		28th	380	
2019	Scott Heckert	78	Toyota																					MOH; 29													28th	380	
2019	Ryan Ellis	78	Toyota																							ROA; 21											28th	380	
2019	J. J. Yeley	78	Toyota																											RCH; 21	CLT; 38						28th	380	
2019	Matt Mills	78	Chevy																															TEX; 18	PHO; 19	HOM; 30	28th	380	
2020	Vinnie Miller	78	Toyota	DAY; 14										TAL; 21											DAY; 11						TAL; 22		KAN; 31				24th	438	
2020	Vinnie Miller	78	Chevy		LVS; 28	CAL; 15	PHO; 27	DAR; 29	CLT; 23	BRI; 12	ATL; 31	HOM; 34	HOM; 29		POC; 18	IND; 32	KEN; 23	KEN; 28	TEX; 25	KAN; 30			DOV; 28	DOV; 36													24th	438	
2020	B. J. McLeod	78	Chevy																							DAR; 14									MAR; 33	PHO; 14	24th	438	
2020	Scott Heckert	78	Toyota																		ROA; 33	DAY; 19															24th	438	
2020	Mason Massey	78	Toyota																								RCH; 27	RCH; 21									24th	438	
2020	Stefan Parsons	78	Toyota																										BRI; 23	LVS; 20							24th	438	
2020	Josh Bilicki	78	Toyota																													CLT; 13					24th	438	
2020	C. J. McLaughlin	78	Toyota																															TEX; 20			24th	438	
2021	Jesse Little	78	Chevy	DAY; 17	DAY; 14				ATL; 22	MAR; 32	TAL; 26	DAR; 32	DOV; 37			MOH; 24	TEX; 29						GLN; 27				DAR; 32		BRI; 28				TEX; 31	KAN; 30			28th	394	
2021	Jesse Little	78	Toyota			HOM; 32	LVS; 26	PHO; 40						COA; DNQ	CLT; 18			NSH; 27	POC; 29		ATL; 28	NHA; 28															28th	394	
2021	Ryan Ellis	78	Toyota																	ROA; 30																	28th	394	
2021	Andy Lally	78	Chevy																					IND; 10													28th	394	
2021	Mason Massey	78	Toyota																						MCH; 30	DAY; 25		RCH; 17		LVS; 23	TAL; 35						28th	394	
2021	Stefan Parsons	78	Chevy																													CLT; 24					28th	394	
2021	Akinori Ogata	78	Toyota																																MAR; 26		28th	394	
2021	Sheldon Creed	78	Chevy																																	PHO; 10	28th	394	
2022	Josh Williams	78	Chevy	DAY; 31	CAL; 21	LVS; DNQ	PHO; 35	ATL; 22	COA; DNQ	RCH; 27	MAR; DNQ	TAL; 19	DOV; 25	DAR; 34	TEX; 20	CLT; 27	PIR; 22	NSH; 34	ROA; 17	ATL; 25		POC; 25	IND; DNQ														35th	327	
2022	Matt Mills	78	Chevy																		NHA; 22			MCH; 38													35th	327	
2022	Matt Mills	78	Toyota																							DAY; 24											35th	327	
2022	Scott Heckert	78	Chevy																						GLN; 23												35th	327	
2022	Brandon Brown	78	Chevy																								DAR; 29					CLT; 20					35th	327	
2022	Stefan Parsons	78	Chevy																									KAN; 26							MAR; 31		35th	327	
2022	B. J. McLeod	78	Chevy																										BRI; 34		TAL; 26			HOM; 36		PHO; 32	35th	327	
2022	Garrett Smithley	78	Chevy																											TEX; 23			LVS; 25				35th	327	
2023	Anthony Alfredo	78	Chevy	DAY; 24	CAL; 17	LVS; 19	PHO; 14	ATL; 14	COA; 16	RCH; 38	MAR; 24	TAL; 37	DOV; 36	DAR; 15	CLT; 32	PIR; 21	SON; 37	NSH; 23	CSC; 27	ATL; 34	NHA; 34	POC; 13	ROA; 16	MCH; 18	IRC; 23	GLN; 31	DAY; 8	DAR; 33	KAN; 27	BRI; 25	TEX; 14	ROV; 30	LVS; 34	HOM; 28	MAR; 8	PHO; 24	24th	454	
2024	B. J. McLeod	78	Chevy	DAY; 15	ATL; 18	LVS; 32	PHO; 14	COA	RCH	MAR	TEX	TAL	DOV	DAR	CLT	PIR	SON	IOW	NHA	NSH	CSC	POC	IND	MCH	DAY	DAR	ATL	GLN	BRI	KAN	TAL	ROV	LVS	HOM	MAR	PHO	-*	-*	

=== Secondary Car history ===
==== #99 (2016) ====
In 2016, the No. 99 car entered Daytona with Chris Fontaine at the wheel, missing the show. The car qualified the following week at Atlanta, with Todd Peck driving. However, Peck also failed to qualify the car in two races. The No. 99 team shut down the rest of the season because they missed most of their races. They returned at Road America with Stanton Barrett. The team returned as the No. 25 at the second Kentucky race, because Chris Cockrum crashed the only car he had for the weekend. Peck replaced him the No. 25 (McLeod's third entry, Blake Jones was in the No. 15, and McLeod in the No. 78). The No. 99 returned at Kansas, Phoenix and Homestead with Jeff Green.

==== #8 (2017-2018) ====
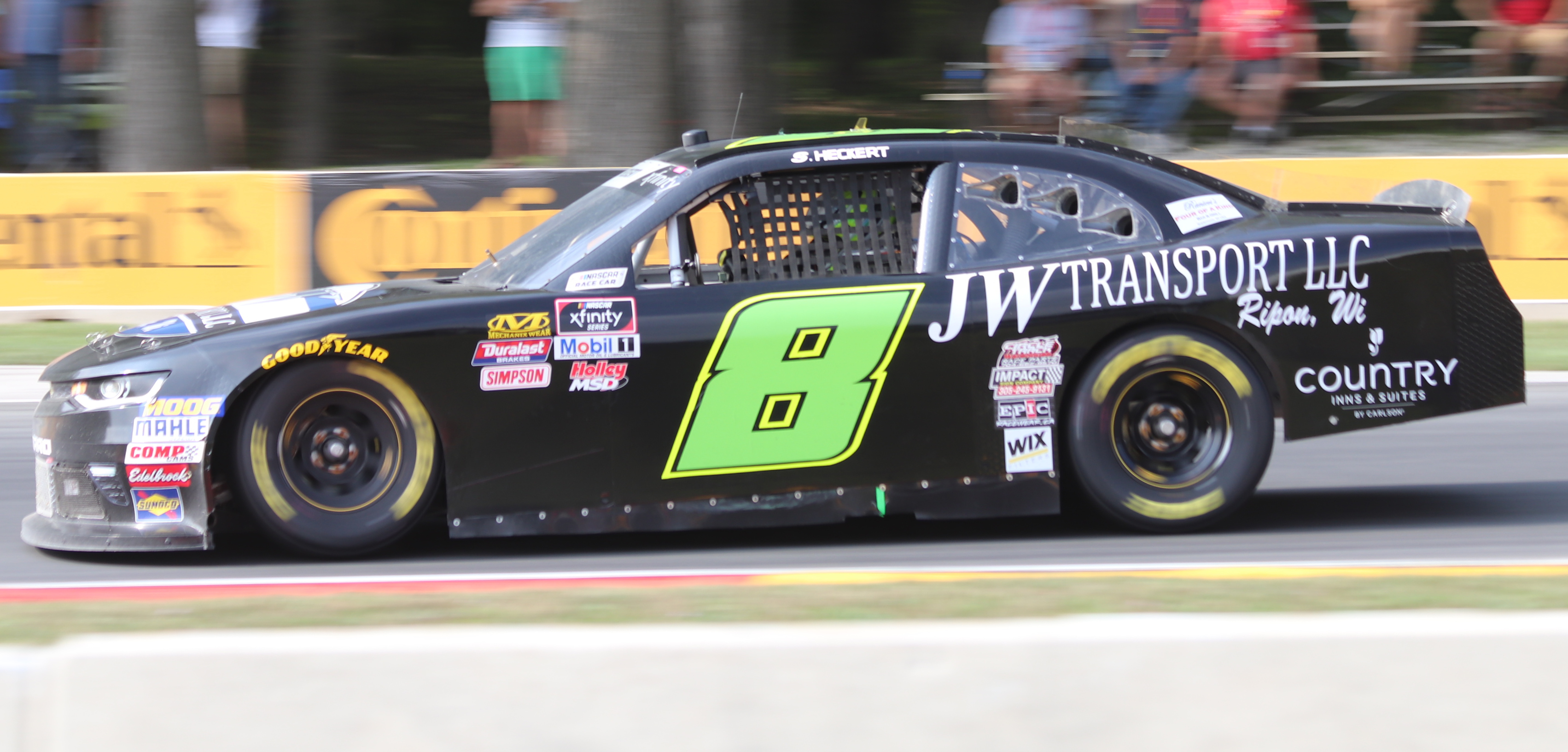
Scott Heckert's 2018 Road America car

In 2017, it was announced that Jeff Green would drive the No. 8 full-time. The team used owner points of the No. 99 from last year, so the team needed to qualify in the Top-33 to make the field. As Green had a Past Champion Provisional, he was locked in the field for the season opener at Daytona. The number was expected to be the No. 15, but Green asked to renumber to No. 8 because he and his brother David Green had both used it in the past. Despite the initial announcement of a full-time campaign for Green, Matt Mills brought sponsorship from Thompson Electric and he drove the car at Phoenix and Richmond. After Charlotte, B. J. McLeod started driving the No. 8 in every race besides the Daytona July race when Green returned to the team for one race. Josh Bilicki drove the No. 8 at the road course races. Tommy Joe Martins drove at Richmond's fall race and Caesar Bacarella ran the final two races (Phoenix and Homestead) for the team.

In 2018, the team returned once again with multiple drivers behind the wheel. Caesar Bacarella, Tommy Joe Martins, Ray Black Jr., Bayley Currey, Blake Jones, Angela Ruch, Scott Heckert and Cody Ware shared the car.

==== #5 (2019-2022) ====
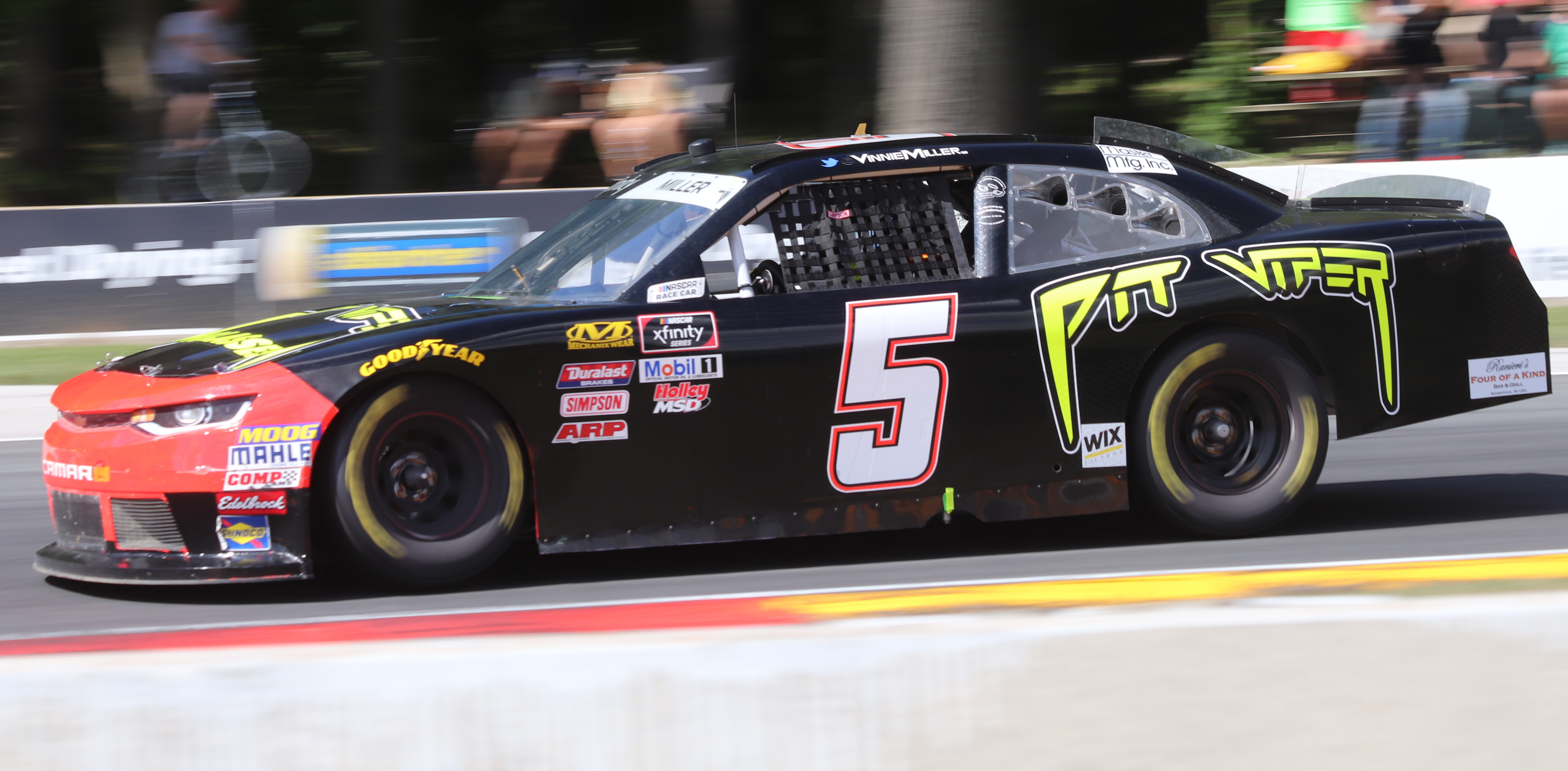
Vinnie Miller in the No. 5 car in 2019 at Road America

Matt Mills was announced as the full-time driver of the No. 8 in 2019, though the number was changed to 5 after JR Motorsports acquired No. 8 from McLeod. Mills would drive for the first 19 races of the season, driving a mix of Chevy's and Toyota's, only getting four top 20's, and 1 top 10 at Daytona. He would be replaced at Watkins Glen by road course ace Scott Heckert who would finish 13th. Vinnie Miller would drive the car at Mid-Ohio and would finish 25th a lap down. Mills would return to the No. 5 at Bristol.

In 2020, Mills returned for full season while Miller drove at Road America and Darlington.

In 2021, Mills drove the No. 5 car for majority of the season while drivers such as Kevin Harvick, Andy Lally, James Davison, Stefan Parsons, and Mason Massey shared the ride.

In 2022, Mills will run a handful of races whilst Rev Racing ARCA Menards Series star Nick Sanchez, Scott Heckert, Stewart–Haas Racing-based Ryan Preece, Joe Graf Jr., and Stefan Parsons drove the rounds Mills wasn't entered in.

==== Secondary Car results ====
Year	Driver	No.	Make	1	2	3	4	5	6	7	8	9	10	11	12	13	14	15	16	17	18	19	20	21	22	23	24	25	26	27	28	29	30	31	32	33	Owners	Pts	ref
2016	Chris Fontaine	99	Ford	DAY; DNQ																																	47th	50	
2016	Todd Peck	99	Ford		ATL; 38	LVS; DNQ	PHO; DNQ	CAL	TEX	BRI	RCH	TAL	DOV	CLT	POC	MCH	IOW	DAY	KEN	NHA	IND	IOW	GLN	MOH	BRI												47th	50	
2016	Stanton Barrett	99	Ford																							ROA; 27	DAR	RCH	CHI	KEN	DOV	CLT					47th	50	
2016	Jeff Green	99	Ford																														KAN; 21	TEX	PHO; 37	HOM; 32	47th	50	
2017	Jeff Green	8	Chevy	DAY; 39	ATL; 26	LVS; 36		CAL; 29	TEX; 36	BRI; 25																											32nd	326	
2017	Jeff Green	8	Toyota									TAL; 10						DAY; 20																			32nd	326	
2017	Matt Mills	8	Chevy				PHO; 30				RCH; 31																										32nd	326	
2017	B. J. McLeod	8	Chevy										CLT; 29	DOV; 22	POC; 26	MCH; 30	IOW; 17		KEN; 24	NHA; 26	IND; 33	IOW; 22			BRI; 26		DAR; 27		CHI; 35	KEN; 28	DOV; 27	CLT; 28	KAN; 32	TEX; 26			32nd	326	
2017	Josh Bilicki	8	Chevy																				GLN; 28	MOH; 29		ROA; 12											32nd	326	
2017	Tommy Joe Martins	8	Chevy																									RCH; 29									32nd	326	
2017	Caesar Bacarella	8	Chevy																																PHO; 30	HOM; 31	32nd	326	
2018	Caesar Bacarella	8	Toyota	DAY; 13																																	26th	364	
2018	Caesar Bacarella	8	Chevy													MCH; 34			DAY; 38									IND; 23									26th	364	
2018	Tommy Joe Martins	8	Chevy		ATL; 33	LVS; 25	PHO; 27	CAL; 24		BRI; 26	RCH; 23			CLT; 24	POC; 25												DAR; 22								PHO; 35	HOM; 26	26th	364	
2018	Tommy Joe Martins	8	Toyota									TAL; 18																									26th	364	
2018	Bayley Currey	8	Chevy						TEX; 22																												26th	364	
2018	Ray Black Jr.	8	Chevy										DOV; 27							KEN; 22		IOW; 28			BRI; 37				LVS; 17	RCH; 23				TEX; 19			26th	364	
2018	Blake Jones	8	Chevy														IOW; 27	CHI; 24																			26th	364	
2018	Angela Ruch	8	Chevy																		NHA; 30																26th	364	
2018	Scott Heckert	8	Chevy																				GLN; 30			ROA; 29											26th	364	
2018	Cody Ware	8	Chevy																					MOH; 33													26th	364	
2018	Dylan Murcott	8	Chevy																												CLT; 30						26th	364	
2018	Matt Mills	8	Chevy																													DOV; 28					26th	364	
2018	Jairo Avila Jr.	8	Chevy																														KAN; 18				26th	364	
2019	Matt Mills	5	Toyota	DAY; 26								TAL; 17			POC; 30				DAY; 10																		26th	408	
2019	Matt Mills	5	Chevy		ATL; 30	LVS; 29	PHO; 28	CAL; 23	TEX; 27	BRI; 21	RCH; 28		DOV; 31	CLT; 26		MCH; 24	IOW; 26	CHI; 27		KEN; 23	NHA; 20	IOW; 18			BRI; 18		DAR; 31	IND; 25	LVS; 24			DOV; 24	KAN; 20				26th	408	
2019	Vinnie Miller	5	Chevy																					MOH; 25		ROA; 28				RCH; 35	CLT; 25			TEX; 24	PHO; 31	HOM; 26	26th	408	
2019	Scott Heckert	5	Toyota																				GLN; 13														26th	408	
2020	Matt Mills	5	Toyota	DAY; 31										TAL; 38			KEN; 30	KEN; 19	TEX; 26	KAN; 26					DAY; 16					LVS; 30	TAL; 21	CLT; 25	KAN; 25	TEX; 13			27th	430	
2020	Matt Mills	5	Chevy		LVS; 25	CAL; 27	PHO; DNQ	DAR; 34	CLT; 30	BRI; 25	ATL; 30	HOM; 27	HOM; 24		POC; 25	IND; 30						DAY; 22	DOV; 33	DOV; 30			RCH; 13	RCH; 13	BRI; 22						MAR; 38	PHO; 35	27th	430	
2020	Vinnie Miller	5	Chevy																		ROA; 34					DAR; 28											27th	430	
2021	Matt Mills	5	Chevy	DAY; 16			LVS; 39	PHO; 35	ATL; 34	MAR; 33		DAR; 40			CLT; 35			NSH; 25	POC; 23		ATL; 26	NHA; 32			MCH; 14		DAR; 23	RCH; 21		LVS; 28					MAR; 29	PHO; 29	29th	378	
2021	Matt Mills	5	Toyota		DAY; 19	HOM; 29					TAL; 25		DOV; 27			MOH; 23	TEX; 26						GLN; 38			DAY; 33					TAL; 23	CLT; 30					29th	378	
2021	Kevin Harvick	5	Ford											COA; 4																							29th	378	
2021	Andy Lally	5	Toyota																	ROA; 13																	29th	378	
2021	James Davison	5	Toyota																					IND; 18													29th	378	
2021	Stefan Parsons	5	Toyota																										BRI; 22								29th	378	
2021	Mason Massey	5	Toyota																														TEX; 27	KAN; 37			29th	378	
2022	Matt Mills	5	Chevy	DAY; 25	CAL; 23	LVS; 35		ATL; 31			MAR; 18	TAL; 31	DOV; 31	DAR; 31	TEX; 37					ATL; 37										TEX; 16			LVS; 35	HOM; 32	MAR; 35	PHO; DNQ	36th	326	
2022	Nick Sanchez	5	Chevy				PHO; 26																														36th	326	
2022	Scott Heckert	5	Chevy						COA; 32								PIR; 13						IND; 31									CLT; 22					36th	326	
2022	Ryan Preece	5	Ford							RCH; 16						CLT; 5		NSH; 6																			36th	326	
2022	Joe Graf Jr.	5	Ford																ROA; 36																		36th	326	
2022	Josh Williams	5	Chevy																		NHA; 24			MCH; 36													36th	326	
2022	Josh Williams	5	Ford																							DAY; 29											36th	326	
2022	Stefan Parsons	5	Chevy																			POC; 23															36th	326	
2022	Brandon Brown	5	Chevy																						GLN; 33				BRI; 38								36th	326	
2022	Tommy Joe Martins	5	Chevy																								DAR; 38										36th	326	
2022	Garrett Smithley	5	Chevy																									KAN; 32									36th	326	
2022	Joey Gase	5	Ford																												TAL; 21						36th	326	

=== Tertiary Car history ===
==== #15 Partnership with Rick Ware (2016) ====
Todd Peck attempted three of the first four races of the 2016 season (Atlanta Motor Speedway, Las Vegas Motor Speedway and Phoenix International Raceway) with the No. 99 but he only was able to make the field at Atlanta. At Phoenix, Ryan Ellis made the field but crashed his only car for the weekend in the No. 15 for Rick Ware Racing, so they called Peck to make the race with his former No. 99, renumbered as the No. 15 car. After this, RWR and B. J. McLeod Motorsports started a partnership to share the No. 15 car full-time. McLeod fielded the car for Peck, Blake Jones, Cody Ware, Travis Kvapil, Timmy Hill, Scott Heckert, Josh Wise, Jeff Green, Stanton Barrett, Michael Lira, Clint King, Josh Reaume and D. J. Kennington. Kvapil recorded a best finish of 20th at Bristol.

==== #99 (2017-2023) ====
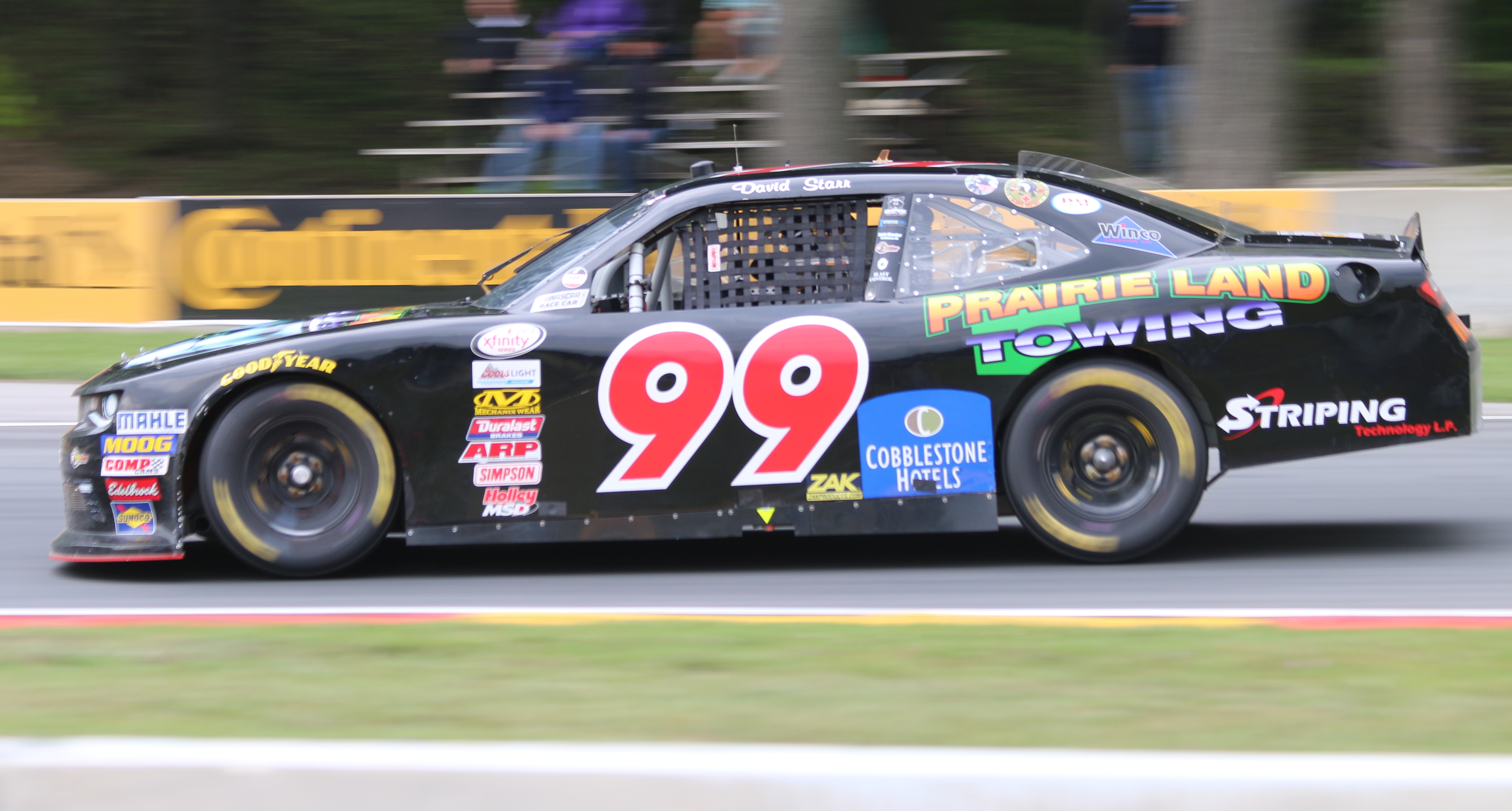
The No. 99 car driven by David Starr at Road America in 2017

In February 2017, it was announced that David Starr would drive the No. 99 Chevrolet Camaro with help from SS-Green Light Racing full-time with sponsorship Striping Technology and Whataburger. The No. 99 used the owner points from the No. 15 from last year to make the field in the first three races. Despite a slow start to the season, Starr recorded a fifth-place finish at the July Daytona race; Starr was originally not entered in the race, as the No. 99 had been scheduled to be driven by Korbin Forrister, but Forrister came down with the flu and Starr was summoned from Texas to race at Daytona.

On January 20, 2018, Ray Black Jr. was announced to drive the No. 99 car starting at Daytona. However, without SS-Green Light Racing's help, the team became part-time. Black attempt the season-opener at Daytona but failed to qualify. B. J. McLeod start and parked the car at Charlotte. Ray Black returned at July's Daytona race and finished 22nd.

In late 2018, Stephen Leicht drove the No. 99 part-time.

In 2019, the team would field for McLeod, Tommy Joe Martins, Jairo Avila Jr., D. J. Kennington, Ryan Ellis, Stefan Parsons, Cody Ware, Todd Peck, Patrick Gallagher, and C. J. McLaughlin. The team usually ran Toyota Supras while the No. 78 and No. 5 usually ran Chevrolet Camaros. Martins would leave the #99 after New Hampshire.

In 2023, Garrett Smithley was announced to drive No. 78 car full-time. However, it was announced in January that he will move to the No. 99 car. Smithley left the team following the race at Las Vegas and joined DGM Racing to drive the No. 91 instead.

==== Tertiary Car results ====
Year	Driver	No.	Make	1	2	3	4	5	6	7	8	9	10	11	12	13	14	15	16	17	18	19	20	21	22	23	24	25	26	27	28	29	30	31	32	33	Owners	Pts	Ref
2016	Travis Kvapil	15	Ford	DAY	ATL	LVS	PHO	CAL	TEX	BRI	RCH; 25	TAL; 25	DOV; 30						KEN; 25						BRI; 20				CHI; 33							HOM; 26	28th	395	
2016	Cody Ware	15	Ford											CLT; 38																							28th	395	
2016	Todd Peck	15	Ford												POC; 28	MCH; 30					IND; 40						DAR; 28										28th	395	
2016	Timmy Hill	15	Ford														IOW; 35	DAY																			28th	395	
2016	Scott Heckert	15	Ford																	NHA; 26			GLN; 16			ROA; 29											28th	395	
2016	Michael Lira	15	Ford																			IOW; 26															28th	395	
2016	Stanton Barrett	15	Ford																					MOH; 20													28th	395	
2016	Clint King	15	Ford																									RCH; 30				CLT; 26		TEX; 26			28th	395	
2016	Blake Jones	15	Ford																											KEN; 35							28th	395	
2016	Josh Wise	15	Ford																												DOV; 39						28th	395	
2016	Josh Reaume	15	Ford																														KAN; 27				28th	395	
2016	D. J. Kennington	15	Ford																																PHO; 30		28th	395	
2017	David Starr	99	Chevy	DAY; 40	ATL; 32	LVS; 28	PHO; 32	CAL; 24	TEX; 24	BRI; 36	RCH; 17	TAL; 18	CLT; 31	DOV; 33	POC; 25	MCH; 21	IOW; 14	DAY; 5	KEN; 31	NHA; 30	IND; 29	IOW; 26	GLN; 30	MOH; 17	BRI; 40	ROA; 28	DAR; 36	RCH; 35	CHI; 22	KEN; 29	DOV; 38	CLT; 26	KAN; 27	TEX; 31	PHO; 29	HOM; 32	33rd	315	
2018	B. J. McLeod	99	Chevy											CLT; 40	POC	MCH	IOW	CHI																			49th	24	
2018	Stephen Leicht	99	Chevy																													DOV; 40	KAN; 32	TEX; 37	PHO; 38	HOM; DNQ	49th	24	
2018	Ray Black Jr.	99	Toyota	DAY; DNQ	ATL	LVS	PHO	CAL	TEX	BRI	RCH	TAL	DOV						DAY; 22	KEN	NHA	IOW	GLN	MOH	BRI	ROA	DAR	IND	LVS	RCH	CLT						49th	24	
2019	D. J. Kennington	99	Toyota	DAY; 33																																	27th	407	
2019	Tommy Joe Martins	99	Toyota		ATL; 31		PHO; 35	CAL; 20	TEX; 19	BRI; 26			DOV; 21			MCH; 18		CHI; 28			NHA; 25																27th	407	
2019	B. J. McLeod	99	Toyota								RCH; 30																										27th	407	
2019	Ryan Ellis	99	Toyota														IOW; 23																				27th	407	
2019	C. J. McLaughlin	99	Toyota																						BRI; 23												27th	407	
2019	Josh Bilicki	99	Toyota																														KAN; 29	TEX; 21	PHO; 23		27th	407	
2019	Stefan Parsons	99	Toyota																DAY; 12			IOW; 21					DAR; 22	IND; 19				DOV; 19					27th	407	
2019	Stefan Parsons	99	Chevy																												CLT; RL^{†}						27th	407	
2019	Cody Ware	99	Toyota									TAL; 21																									27th	407	
2019	Cody Ware	99	Chevy																				GLN; 21								CLT; 24						27th	407	
2019	Jairo Avila Jr.	99	Chevy			LVS; 25								CLT; DNQ						KEN; 38																HOM; 25	27th	407	
2019	Jairo Avila Jr.	99	Toyota																										LVS; 27								27th	407	
2019	Todd Peck	99	Chevy												POC; 27																						27th	407	
2019	Patrick Gallagher	99	Chevy																					MOH; 23													27th	407	
2019	Loris Hezemans	99	Chevy																							ROA; 22											27th	407	
2019	Matt Mills	99	Chevy																											RCH; 28							27th	407	
2020	Josh Bilicki	99	Toyota	DAY; 21		CAL; 29										IND; 23					ROA; 17	DAY; 12									TAL; 18						36th	296	
2020	Mason Massey	99	Toyota		LVS; 29			DAR; 30	CLT; 21	BRI; 30	ATL; 23			TAL; 20			KEN; 28	KEN; 23																			36th	296	
2020	Stefan Parsons	99	Toyota									HOM; 22	HOM; 32		POC; 21				TEX; 18				DOV; 26	DOV; 28											MAR; 24		36th	296	
2020	Jairo Avila Jr.	99	Toyota																	KAN; 32																	36th	296	
2020	Joey Gase	99	Toyota																						DAY; 28												36th	296	
2020	J. J. Yeley	99	Chevy				PHO; DNQ																														36th	296	
2020	Matt Mills	99	Chevy																							DAR; 22											36th	296	
2020	Vinnie Miller	99	Chevy																								RCH; 30	RCH; 32	BRI; 33	LVS; 34							36th	296	
2020	C. J. McLaughlin	99	Chevy																													CLT; 29					36th	296	
2020	Jesse Iwuji	99	Chevy																														KAN; 27	TEX; 23		PHO; 30	36th	296	
2021	Stefan Parsons	99	Chevy	DAY; 13			LVS; 36										TEX; 35																			PHO; 34	33rd	337	
2021	Stefan Parsons	99	Toyota			HOM; 31		PHO; 18		MAR; 20								NSH; 36																			33rd	337	
2021	Andy Lally	99	Chevy		DAY; 31																																33rd	337	
2021	Mason Massey	99	Toyota						ATL; 32		TAL; 27								POC; 30		ATL; 29																33rd	337	
2021	Mason Massey	99	Chevy																			NHA; 40															33rd	337	
2021	Ryan Ellis	99	Toyota									DAR; 16		COA; 24		MOH; 28											DAR; 35										33rd	337	
2021	Ryan Ellis	99	Chevy																																MAR; 23		33rd	337	
2021	B. J. McLeod	99	Chevy										DOV; 21																	LVS; 30							33rd	337	
2021	Chase Briscoe	99	Ford												CLT; 6											DAY; 19											33rd	337	
2021	Kevin Harvick	99	Ford																	ROA; 6				IND; 33													33rd	337	
2021	Kyle Tilley	99	Chevy																				GLN; 40														33rd	337	
2021	Jesse Little	99	Toyota																						MCH; 32												33rd	337	
2021	Sam Mayer	99	Chevy																									RCH; 12									33rd	337	
2021	Matt Mills	99	Chevy																										BRI; 36				TEX; 32	KAN; 25			33rd	337	
2021	J. J. Yeley	99	Chevy																												TAL; 16	CLT; 19					33rd	337	
2022	Stefan Parsons	99	Chevy	DAY; DNQ	CAL; 30	LVS; 33	PHO; 21	ATL; 25	COA; 21	RCH; 35	MAR; 28	TAL	DOV; 30	DAR; 20	TEX																						41st	82	
2022	Nick Sanchez	99	Chevy													CLT; 28	PIR																				41st	82	
2022	Matt Mills	99	Chevy															NSH; DNQ	ROA	ATL	NHA	POC	IND	MCH	GLN	DAY	DAR	KAN	BRI	TEX	TAL	CLT	LVS	HOM	MAR	PHO	41st	82	
2023	Garrett Smithley	99	Chevy	DAY; DNQ	CAL; DNQ	LVS; 36	PHO	ATL	COA	RCH	MAR	TAL	DOV	DAR	CLT	PIR	SON	NSH	CSC	ATL	NHA	POC	ROA	MCH	IRC	GLN	DAY	DAR	KAN	BRI	TEX	ROV	LVS	HOM	MAR	PHO	51st	1	
^{†} – Relieved Cody Ware.

=== Fourth Part-Time Car history ===
In 2021, the team fielded the No. 76 car for Stefan Parsons at Charlotte Motor Speedway.

In 2022, the team fielded the No. 55 car for Matt Mills at Richmond Raceway and Charlotte Motor Speedway.

==== Car No. 55/76 results ====
Year	Driver	No.	Make	1	2	3	4	5	6	7	8	9	10	11	12	13	14	15	16	17	18	19	20	21	22	23	24	25	26	27	28	29	30	31	32	33	Owners	Pts	ref
2021	Stefan Parsons	76	Chevy	DAY	DAY	HOM	LVS	PHO	ATL	MAR	TAL	DAR	DOV	COA	CLT; 23	MOH	TEX	NSH	POC	ROA	ATL	NHA	GLN	IND	MCH	DAY	DAR	RCH	BRI	LVS	TAL	CLT	TEX	KAN	MAR	PHO	46th	14	
2022	Matt Mills	55	Chevy	DAY	CAL	LVS	PHO	ATL	COA	RCH; DNQ	MAR	TAL	DOV	DAR	TEX	CLT; 20	PIR	NSH	ROA	ATL	NHA	POC	IND	MCH	GLN	DAY	DAR	KAN	BRI	TEX	TAL	CLT	LVS	HOM	MAR	PHO			

=== Car No. 90 (Partnership with King Autosport) history ===
In 2015, McLeod fielded a part-time team in partner with King Autosport, sharing the owner points of the 90/92 team. In 2016, Todd Peck returned to the No. 90 team at the Richmond spring race.

==== Car No. 90 results ====
Year	Driver	No.	Make	1	2	3	4	5	6	7	8	9	10	11	12	13	14	15	16	17	18	19	20	21	22	23	24	25	26	27	28	29	30	31	32	33	Owners	Pts	Ref
2016	Todd Peck	90	Ford	DAY	ATL	LVS	PHO	CAL	TEX	BRI	RCH; 32	TAL	DOV	CLT	POC	MCH	IOW	DAY	KEN	NHA	IND	IOW	GLN	MOH	BRI	ROA	DAR	RCH	CHI	KEN	DOV	CLT	KAN	TEX	PHO	HOM	25th*	477*	
* Finished 25th in owner points with 477 points as it was their own entry however the points were owned by King Autosport.

== Camping World Truck Series ==
Note: Christopher Long is listed as the owner for these races.

=== Truck No. 0 history ===
Matt Tifft made one start with this truck, at Martinsville Speedway in 2014. He scored an eighth-place finish, the team's best in the Truck Series.

==== Truck No. 0 results ====
Year	Team	No.	Make	1	2	3	4	5	6	7	8	9	10	11	12	13	14	15	16	17	18	19	20	21	22	Owners	Pts
2014	Matt Tifft	0	Chevy	DAY	MAR	KAN	CLT	DOV	TEX	GTW	KEN	IOW	ELD	POC	MCH	BRI	MSP	CHI	NHA	LVS	TAL	MAR; 8	TEX	PHO	HOM		

=== Truck No. 35 history ===
Tommy Regan made one start in this truck, at Martinsville in 2015.

==== Truck No. 35 results ====
Year	Team	No.	Make	1	2	3	4	5	6	7	8	9	10	11	12	13	14	15	16	17	18	19	20	21	22	23	Owners	Pts
2015	Tommy Regan	35	Chevy	DAY	ATL	MAR; 25	KAN	CLT	DOV	TEX	GTW	IOW	KEN	ELD	POC	MCH	BRI	MSP	CHI	NHA	LVS	TAL	MAR	TEX	PHO	HOM		

=== Truck No. 45 history ===
Regan debuted this truck in 2014, making one start with it at Iowa Speedway. Tifft made two starts in it later in the season. Chris Fontaine ran this number for the Eldora Speedway race in 2015 and also ran in Talladega late in the season. McLeod made ten other starts, receiving funding from Tilted Kilt Pub & Eatery. Regan also made two starts with the truck at Iowa and Gateway.

==== Truck No. 45 results ====
Year	Team	No.	Make	1	2	3	4	5	6	7	8	9	10	11	12	13	14	15	16	17	18	19	20	21	22	23	Owners	Pts
2014	Tommy Regan	45	Chevy	DAY	MAR	KAN	CLT	DOV	TEX	GTW	KEN	IOW; 36	ELD	POC	MCH	BRI	MSP	CHI	NHA	LVS	TAL	MAR	TEX					
2014	Matt Tifft	45	Chevy																					PHO; 20	HOM; 21			
2015	B. J. McLeod	45	Chevy	DAY	ATL	MAR	KAN; 28	CLT; 31	DOV; 27	TEX; 27			KEN; 29		POC; 29	MCH; 30	BRI; DNQ	MSP; 28	CHI; 28	NHA	LVS; 28	TAL	MAR					
2015	Tommy Regan	45	Chevy								GTW; 24	IOW; 28																
2015	Chris Fontaine	45	Chevy											ELD; 16														
2015	Todd Peck	45	Chevy																					TEX; 28				
2015	Brandon Hightower	45	Chevy																						PHO; DNQ	HOM		

=== Truck No. 78 history ===
McLeod ran this truck for two races in 2011, with a best finish of 20th at Nashville its team debut in NASCAR. He also made one race with this truck in 2013. Tommy Regan returned at Texas (fall) in 2016 but failed to qualify.

==== Truck No. 78 results ====
Year	Team	No.	Make	1	2	3	4	5	6	7	8	9	10	11	12	13	14	15	16	17	18	19	20	21	22	23	24	25	Owners	Pts
2011	B. J. McLeod	78	Chevy	DAY	PHO	DAR	MAR	NSH	DOV	CLT	KAN	TEX	KEN	IOW	NSH; 20	IRP	POC	MCH	BRI	ATL; 30	CHI	NHA	KEN	LVS	TAL	MAR	TEX	HOM		
2013	B. J. McLeod	78	Chevy	DAY	MAR	CAR	KAN	CLT	DOV	TEX	KEN	IOW	ELD	POC	MCH	BRI; Wth	MSP	IOW	CHI	LVS	TAL	MAR	TEX	PHO	HOM; 19					
2016	Tommy Regan	78	Chevy	DAY	ATL	MAR	KAN	DOV	CLT	TEX	IOW	GTW	KEN	ELD	POC	BRI	MCH	MSP	CHI	NHA	LVS	TAL	MAR	TEX; DNQ	PHO	HOM				
