= Jairo Avila Jr. =

American racing driver (born 1995)

- Born: May 11, 1995 (age 31); Alhambra, California, U.S.

NASCAR O'Reilly Auto Parts Series career
- 8 races run over 3 years
- 2020 position: 67th
- Best finish: 54th (2018)
- First race: 2018 Food City 300 (Bristol)
- Last race: 2020 Kansas Lottery 250 (Kansas)
Wins	Top tens	Poles
0	0	0
- Statistics up to date as of November 9, 2020.

Jairo Avila Jr. (born May 11, 1995) is a Colombian-American professional stock car racing driver. He last competed part-time in the NASCAR Xfinity Series, driving the No. 02 Chevrolet Camaro for Our Motorsports and the No. 99 Toyota Supra for B. J. McLeod Motorsports.

== Racing career ==
=== NASCAR Xfinity Series ===
Avila made his NASCAR Xfinity Series debut in 2018. He drove the No. 78 Chevrolet for B. J. McLeod Motorsports at Bristol Motor Speedway, where he finished 20th after starting 27th. He returned to the team for the Kansas Speedway race, driving the No. 8 Chevrolet instead. He finished 18th after starting 32nd.

In 2019, Avila drove the No. 99 Chevrolet for B. J. McLeod Motorsports at Las Vegas. He finished 25th after starting 24th.

Avila joined Our Motorsports in June 2020, driving the No. 02 in the second race at Homestead–Miami Speedway. Brett Moffitt had driven the car in the weekend's first event, with the driver switch meaning Avila had to start at the rear.

=== NASCAR K&N Pro Series West ===
Avila made his NASCAR debut in the NASCAR K&N Pro Series West in 2014, driving the No. 39 Ford at the Stateline Speedway race. He finished seventh after starting 11th. Afterwards, he ran the next four races, in the No. 38 Chevrolet/Ford at Colorado and Evergreen, and the No. 36 Ford/Toyota at Iowa and Kern County Raceway Park.

=== NASCAR K&N Pro Series East ===
Avila ran the first 11 races in the 2016 NASCAR K&N Pro Series East season. He drove the No. 42 Toyota for Rev Racing. He had an average start of 14th and an average finish of 16th throughout the season.

=== ARCA Racing Series ===
In 2015, Avila participated in two ARCA Racing Series races. He drove the No. 58 Ford at Pocono, finishing 16th after starting 25th. He then drove the No. 36 Ford at Kansas, finishing tenth after starting 15th.

== Motorsports career results ==
=== NASCAR ===
(key) (Bold – Pole position awarded by qualifying time. Italics – Pole position earned by points standings or practice time. * – Most laps led.)

==== Xfinity Series ====
NASCAR Xfinity Series results
Year	Team	No.	Make	1	2	3	4	5	6	7	8	9	10	11	12	13	14	15	16	17	18	19	20	21	22	23	24	25	26	27	28	29	30	31	32	33	NXSC	Pts	Ref
2018	B. J. McLeod Motorsports	78	Chevy	DAY	ATL	LVS	PHO	CAL	TEX	BRI	RCH	TAL	DOV	CLT	POC	MCH	IOW	CHI	DAY	KEN	NHA	IOW	GLN	MOH	BRI; 20	ROA	DAR	IND	LVS	RCH	CLT	DOV					54th	36	
2018	B. J. McLeod Motorsports	8	Chevy																														KAN; 18	TEX	PHO	HOM	54th	36	
2019	B. J. McLeod Motorsports	99	Chevy	DAY	ATL	LVS; 25	PHO	CAL	TEX	BRI	RCH	TAL	DOV	CLT; DNQ	POC	MCH	IOW	CHI	DAY	KEN; 38	NHA	IOW	GLN	MOH	BRI	ROA	DAR	IND								HOM; 25	55th	35	
2019	B. J. McLeod Motorsports	99	Toyota																										LVS; 27	RCH	CLT	DOV	KAN	TEX	PHO		55th	35	
2020	Our Motorsports	02	Chevy	DAY	LVS	CAL	PHO	DAR	CLT	BRI	ATL	HOM	HOM; 37	TAL	POC	IND	KEN	KEN	TEX																		67th	6	
2020	B. J. McLeod Motorsports	99	Toyota																	KAN; 32	ROA	DAY	DOV	DOV	DAY	DAR	RCH	RCH	BRI	LVS	TAL	CLT	KAN	TEX	MAR	PHO	67th	6	

==== K&N Pro Series East ====
NASCAR K&N Pro Series East results
Year	Team	No.	Make	1	2	3	4	5	6	7	8	9	10	11	12	13	14	NKNPSEC	Pts	Ref
2016	Rev Racing	42	Toyota	NSM; 23	MOB; 15	GRE; 12	BRI; 22	VIR; 7	DOM; 12	STA; 19	COL; 14	NHA; 19	IOW; 12	GLN; 21	GRE	NJE	DOV	14th	308	

==== K&N Pro Series West ====
NASCAR K&N Pro Series West results
Year	Team	No.	Make	1	2	3	4	5	6	7	8	9	10	11	12	13	14	NKNPSWC	Pts	Ref
2014	Patriot Motorsports Group	39	Ford	PHO	IRW	S99	IOW	KCR	SON	SLS; 7								16th	169	
2014	Patriot Motorsports Group	38	Chevy								CNS; 10							16th	169	
2014	Patriot Motorsports Group	36	Ford									IOW; 10						16th	169	
2014	Patriot Motorsports Group	38	Ford										EVG; 16					16th	169	
2014	Patriot Motorsports Group	36	Toyota											KCR; 8	MMP	AAS	PHO	16th	169	

=== ARCA Racing Series ===
(key) (Bold – Pole position awarded by qualifying time. Italics – Pole position earned by points standings or practice time. * – Most laps led.)

ARCA Racing Series results
Year	Team	No.	Make	1	2	3	4	5	6	7	8	9	10	11	12	13	14	15	16	17	18	19	20	ARSC	Pts	Ref
2015	Lira Motorsports	58	Ford	DAY	MOB	NSH	SLM	TAL	TOL	NJE	POC	MCH	CHI	WIN	IOW	IRP	POC; 16	BLN	ISF	DSF	SLM	KEN		71st	330	
2015	Lira Motorsports	36	Ford																				KAN; 10	71st	330	
2016	Lira Motorsports	59	Ford	DAY; 39	NSH	SLM	TAL	TOL	NJE	POC	MCH	MAD	WIN	IOW	IRP	POC	BLN	ISF	DSF	SLM	CHI	KEN	KAN	134th	35	
