= Ray Black Jr. =

American racing driver (born 1991)

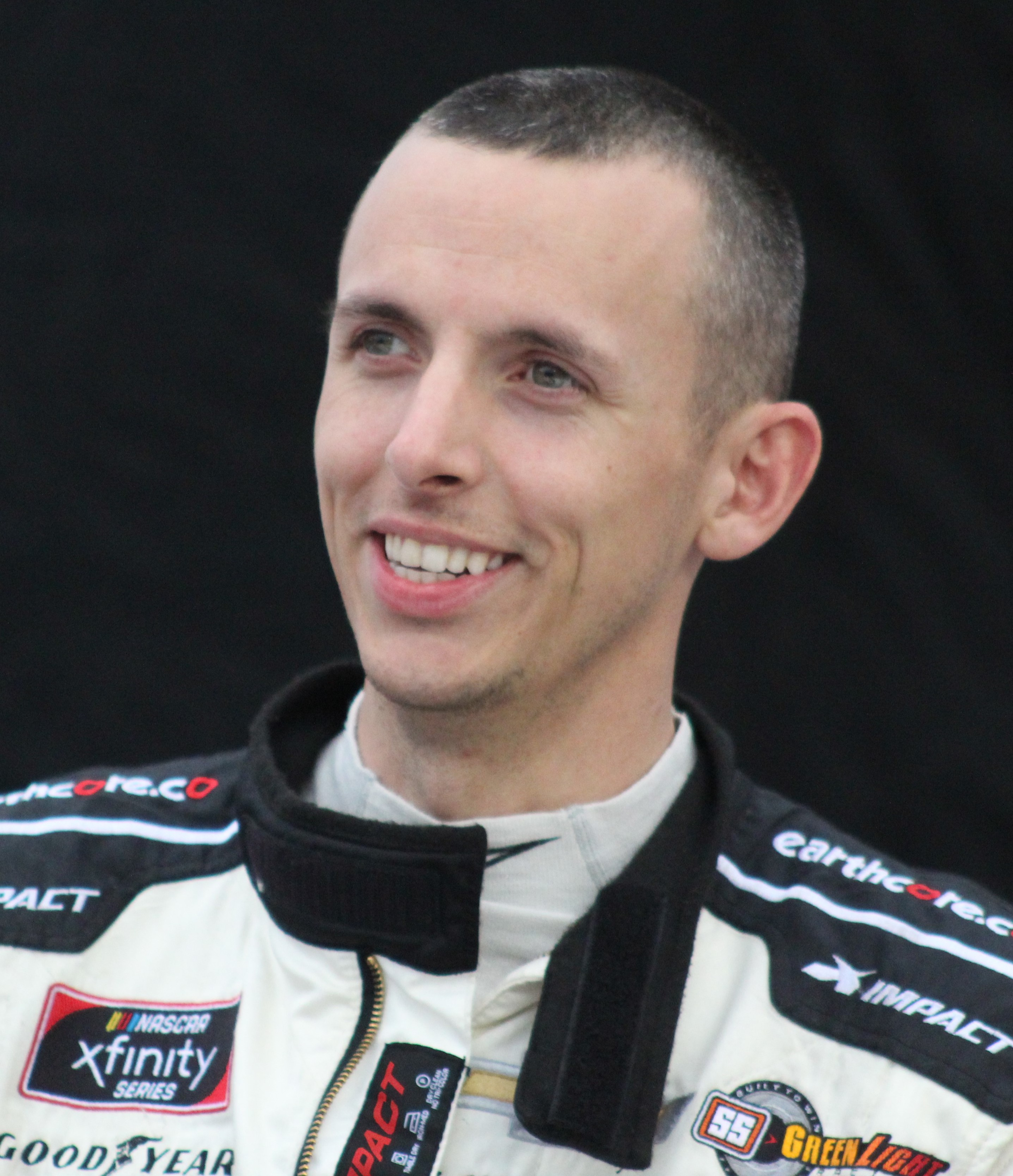
- Black at Richmond Raceway in 2019
- Born: Raymond Black Jr. May 17, 1991 (age 35); Montgomery, Alabama, U.S.

NASCAR Cup Series career
- 4 races run over 2 years
- 2018 position: 55th
- Best finish: 55th (2018)
- First race: 2017 Tales of the Turtles 400 (Chicagoland)
- Last race: 2018 Coke Zero Sugar 400 (Daytona Beach)
Wins	Top tens	Poles
0	0	0

NASCAR O'Reilly Auto Parts Series career
- 103 races run over 6 years
- 2020 position: 40th
- Best finish: 16th (2019)
- First race: 2015 O'Reilly Auto Parts Challenge (Texas)
- Last race: 2020 Toyota 200 (Darlington)
Wins	Top tens	Poles
0	1	0

NASCAR FedEx Freight Truck Series career
- 31 races run over 3 years
- 2016 position: 99th
- Best finish: 11th (2015)
- First race: 2014 Kroger 250 (Martinsville)
- Last race: 2016 American Ethanol E15 225 (Chicagoland)
Wins	Top tens	Poles
0	1	0
- Statistics up to date as of November 9, 2020.

Raymond Black Jr. (born May 17, 1991) is an American former professional stock car racing driver. He last competed full-time in the NASCAR Xfinity Series, driving the No. 07 Chevrolet Camaro for SS-Green Light Racing.

== Racing career ==
Born in Montgomery, Alabama, Black moved to Palm Coast, Florida when he was nine years old. After playing racing video games on his PlayStation, Black developed an interest in racing professionally at the age of fourteen. In 2006, Black began racing in the Florida Mini Cup Racing Association's Junior All-Star division, winning the championship after finishing in the top five in every race. In 2013, he began racing Pro Late Models.

=== Camping World Truck Series ===
In 2014, Black made his NASCAR Camping World Truck Series debut at Martinsville Speedway for SS-Green Light Racing, driving the No. 07. Due to qualifying being rained out, Black started 29th based on his team's owners points standing in 2013. Black finished 24th, five laps behind race winner Matt Crafton. Black made six additional starts for the team in 2014, with a best finish of eighteenth at Chicagoland Speedway and Texas Motor Speedway, the former being where he led his only lap of the season.

On December 16, Black announced he would compete full-time in the Truck Series with SS-Green Light for 2015, competing for Rookie of the Year honors. In the season-opening race at Daytona International Speedway, Black finished fifth after avoiding a crash on the backstretch. After not finishing in the top-ten for the rest of the season, but rarely finishing outside the top-twenty, he managed an eleventh-place points finish.

=== Xfinity Series ===
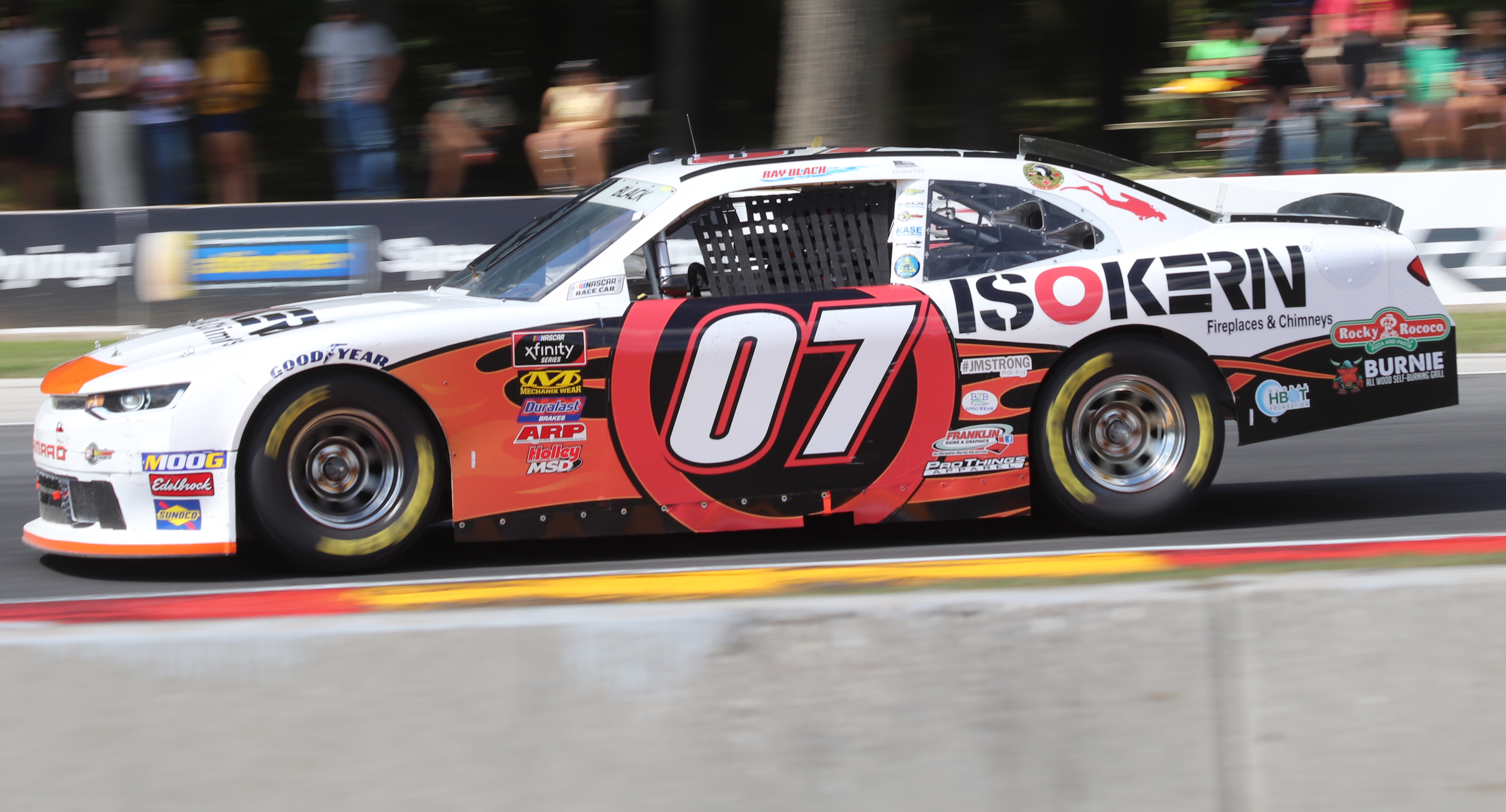
Black at Road America in 2019

In November 2015, Black made his Xfinity Series debut at Texas, driving the No. 15 for Rick Ware Racing. On January 13, 2016, Black announced he would drive the No. 07 Chevrolet Camaro full-time for SS-Green Light Racing. He finished nineteenth in his debut season, failing to break in to the top-ten in any races.

After starting the 2017 NASCAR Xfinity Series season with SS-Green Light, Black was replaced by Todd Bodine for the Charlotte race in 2017 due to a lack of sponsorship. Spencer Boyd, Korbin Forrister, Andy Lally, Ryan Ellis and Devin Jones also ran in the 07 when Black could not bring sponsorship. Boyd took over the ride that Black ran 21 of the 33 races in 2017 for 2018 with funding from Grunt Style.

After losing his ride with Ware in the Cup Series, Black returned with B. J. McLeod Motorsports at Daytona in 2018. The team failed to qualify along with five other cars. Black returned to the Xfinity Series sporadically in summer 2018, with Isokern Fireplaces as his sponsor.

In January 2019, it was announced that Black would compete full-time in 2019, driving the No. 07 car for SS-Green Light Racing.

Black began the 2020 season by scoring his first career Xfinity top-ten finish, avoiding late crashes to finish eighth at Daytona. Despite enjoying a strong start to the year with an average finish of 18.6 across the first five races, he withdrew from full-time racing in late May to help his sponsor and father's business CDA Technical Institute, which was struggling financially due to the COVID-19 pandemic.

=== Monster Energy Cup Series ===
In September 2017, Black joined Rick Ware Racing's No. 51 Monster Energy NASCAR Cup Series car at Chicagoland's Tales of the Turtles 400. After qualifying 39th, he finished 40th, sixteen laps behind race winner Martin Truex Jr. He made two more starts in the Playoffs, finishing 34th at Texas and 38th at Homestead. On November 22, 2017, Black joined the RWR team for a full 2018 Monster Energy NASCAR Cup Series season and a Rookie of the Year effort. However the deal fell through later in the offseason, as Black's family, which owned reported sponsor ScubaLife, allegedly backed out of the commitment in December.

Despite no longer having a deal to drive full-time in the Cup Series for Ware, Black did drive RWR's No. 51 Chevrolet Camaro Zl1 for the 2018 Coke Zero Sugar 400, with a 16th-place finish. It is worth mentioning, that Black's car was serviced by two female pit crew members, for the first time in NASCAR Cup Series history.

== Motorsports career results ==
=== NASCAR ===
(key) (Bold – Pole position awarded by qualifying time. Italics – Pole position earned by points standings or practice time. * – Most laps led.)

==== Monster Energy Cup Series ====
Monster Energy NASCAR Cup Series results
Year	Team	No.	Make	1	2	3	4	5	6	7	8	9	10	11	12	13	14	15	16	17	18	19	20	21	22	23	24	25	26	27	28	29	30	31	32	33	34	35	36	MENCC	Pts	Ref
2017	Rick Ware Racing	51	Chevy	DAY	ATL	LVS	PHO	CAL	MAR	TEX	BRI	RCH	TAL	KAN	CLT	DOV	POC	MCH	SON	DAY	KEN	NHA	IND	POC	GLN	MCH	BRI	DAR	RCH	CHI; 40	NHA	DOV	CLT	TAL	KAN	MAR	TEX; 34	PHO	HOM; 38	64th	0^{1}	
2018	Rick Ware Racing	51	Chevy	DAY	ATL	LVS	PHO	CAL	MAR	TEX	BRI	RCH	TAL	DOV	KAN	CLT	POC	MCH	SON	CHI	DAY; 16	KEN	NHA	POC	GLN	MCH	BRI	DAR	IND	LVS	RCH	CLT	DOV	TAL	KAN	MAR	TEX	PHO	HOM	55th	0^{1}	

==== Xfinity Series ====
NASCAR Xfinity Series results
Year	Team	No.	Make	1	2	3	4	5	6	7	8	9	10	11	12	13	14	15	16	17	18	19	20	21	22	23	24	25	26	27	28	29	30	31	32	33	NXSC	Pts	Ref
2015	SS-Green Light Racing	15	Chevy	DAY	ATL	LVS	PHO	CAL	TEX	BRI	RCH	TAL	IOW	CLT	DOV	MCH	CHI	DAY	KEN	NHA	IND	IOW	GLN	MOH	BRI	ROA	DAR	RCH	CHI	KEN	DOV	CLT	KAN	TEX; 27	PHO	HOM	107th	0^{1}	
2016	SS-Green Light Racing	07	Chevy	DAY; 33	ATL; 33	LVS; 25	PHO; 25	CAL; 37	TEX; 22	BRI; 20	RCH; 24	TAL; 29	DOV; 17	CLT; 37	POC; 21	MCH; 23	IOW; 30	DAY; 39	KEN; 19	NHA; 21	IND; 33	IOW; 20	GLN; 20	MOH; 30	BRI; 14	ROA; 15	DAR; 21	RCH; 25	CHI; 28	KEN; 20	DOV; 24	CLT; 28	KAN; 19	TEX; 27	PHO; 36	HOM; 28	19th	515	
2017	SS-Green Light Racing	07	Chevy	DAY; 18	ATL; 29	LVS; 31	PHO; 29	CAL; 27	TEX; 25	BRI; 37	RCH; 18	TAL; 40	CLT	DOV; 24	POC	MCH	IOW; 29	DAY; 12	KEN; 27	NHA	IND; 24	IOW; 30	GLN	MOH	BRI; 21	ROA	DAR; 25	RCH	CHI	KEN	DOV; 21	CLT; 21	KAN	TEX	PHO; 24	HOM; 25	27th	245	
2018	B. J. McLeod Motorsports	99	Toyota	DAY; DNQ	ATL	LVS	PHO	CAL	TEX	BRI	RCH	TAL							DAY; 22																		35th	131	
2018	B. J. McLeod Motorsports	8	Chevy										DOV; 27							KEN; 22	NHA	IOW; 28	GLN	MOH	BRI; 37	ROA	DAR	IND	LVS; 17	RCH; 23				TEX; 19	PHO	HOM	35th	131	
2018	B. J. McLeod Motorsports	78	Chevy											CLT; 19	POC	MCH	IOW	CHI																			35th	131	
2018	B. J. McLeod Motorsports	74	Chevy																												CLT; 26	DOV	KAN				35th	131	
2019	SS-Green Light Racing	07	Chevy	DAY; 30	ATL; 23	LVS; 11	PHO; 18	CAL; 17	TEX; 35	BRI; 16	RCH; 21	TAL; 34	DOV; 24	CLT; 16	POC; 18	MCH; 30	IOW; 16	CHI; 20	DAY; 13	KEN; 35	NHA; 18	IOW; 11	GLN; 22	MOH; 19	BRI; 15	ROA; 14	DAR; 16	IND; 20	LVS; 19	RCH; 18	CLT; 32	DOV; 17	KAN; 14	TEX; 12	PHO; 14	HOM; 38	16th	547	
2020	SS-Green Light Racing	07	Chevy	DAY; 8	LVS; 17	CAL; 22	PHO; 25	DAR; 21	CLT	BRI	ATL	HOM	HOM	TAL	POC	IND	KEN	KEN	TEX	KAN	ROA	DAY	DOV	DOV	DAY	DAR	RCH	RCH	BRI	LVS	TAL	CLT	KAN	TEX	MAR	PHO	40th	92	

==== Camping World Truck Series ====
NASCAR Camping World Truck Series results
Year	Team	No.	Make	1	2	3	4	5	6	7	8	9	10	11	12	13	14	15	16	17	18	19	20	21	22	23	NCWTC	Pts	Ref
2014	SS-Green Light Racing	07	Chevy	DAY	MAR; 24	KAN	CLT	DOV	TEX	GTW; 24	KEN	IOW	ELD														29th	148	
2014	SS-Green Light Racing	08	Chevy											POC; 28	MCH	BRI	MSP	CHI; 18	NHA; 21	LVS	TAL	MAR	TEX; 18	PHO	HOM; 28		29th	148	
2015	SS-Green Light Racing	07	Chevy	DAY; 5	ATL; 25	MAR; 13	KAN; 21	CLT; 22	DOV; 11	TEX; 16	GTW; 13	IOW; 15	KEN; 13	ELD; 15	POC; 24	MCH; 26	BRI; 21	MSP; 15	CHI; 11	NHA; 13	LVS; 12	TAL; 14	MAR; 20	TEX; 19	PHO; 20	HOM; 18	11th	635	
2016	SS-Green Light Racing	07	Chevy	DAY	ATL	MAR	KAN	DOV	CLT	TEX	IOW	GTW	KEN	ELD	POC	BRI	MCH	MSP	CHI; 18	NHA	LVS	TAL	MAR	TEX	PHO	HOM	99th	0^{1}	

^{*} Season still in progress
^{1} Ineligible for series points
