= ACG Motorsports =

NASCAR team

- Owner: Chris Cockrum
- Base: Conyers, Georgia
- Series: Xfinity Series
- Race drivers: Chris Cockrum
- Manufacturer: Chevrolet
- Opened: 2015

Career
- Races competed: 14
- Drivers' Championships: 0
- Race victories: 0
- Pole positions: 0

ACG Motorsports, formerly known as Chris Cockrum Racing, is an American professional stock car racing team that formerly competed in the NASCAR Xfinity Series. The team last fielded the No. 25 Chevrolet Camaro part-time for Chris Cockrum, who also is the team's owner.

== History ==
=== Xfinity Series ===
==== Car No. 25 history ====
Chris Cockrum fielded the No. 25 Chevrolet Camaro part-time since his team opened in 2015, attempting mostly superspeedway races. In 2017, P. J. Jones attempted to drive the car at Watkins Glen, but failed to qualify.

In 2019, the team returned in a partnership with Rick Ware Racing at Daytona in February and Talladega in April. Cockrum drove the RWR No. 17 in those two races, scoring a Top-10 finish at Talladega. At Daytona in July, Cockrum returned to fielding his own team with his own owner points (independent from Rick Ware Racing) under the name ACG Motorsports (ACG standing for sponsor Advanced Communications Group), and using the No. 25.

He continued in 2020 by attempting the season opener at Daytona, with plans to run the other two superspeedway races later in the year. These plans were scrapped as a result of the Covid-19 pandemic. Cockrum again attempted the season opener in 2021, failing to qualify. The team has not made any starts since.

==== Car No. 25 Results ====
NASCAR Xfinity Series results
Year	Driver	No.	Make	1	2	3	4	5	6	7	8	9	10	11	12	13	14	15	16	17	18	19	20	21	22	23	24	25	26	27	28	29	30	31	32	33	NXSC	Pts
2015	Chris Cockrum	37	Chevrolet	DAY	ATL	LVS	PHO	CAL	TEX	BRI	RCH	TAL	IOW	CLT	DOV	MCH	CHI	DAY; DNQ	KEN	NHA	IND	IOW	GLN	MOH	BRI	ROA	DAR	RCH	CHI	KEN	DOV	CLT	KAN	TEX	PHO	HOM		
2016	Chris Cockrum	25	Chevrolet	DAY; 28	ATL; 29	LVS	PHO	CAL	TEX	BRI	RCH	TAL; 37	DOV	CLT	POC	MCH; 32	IOW	DAY	KEN	NHA; 29	IND	IOW	GLN	MOH	BRI	ROA	DAR	RCH; QL^{†}	CHI	KEN	DOV	CLT; 35	KAN	TEX	PHO	HOM		
2017	Chris Cockrum	25	Chevrolet	DAY; 28	ATL; 34	LVS	PHO	CAL	TEX	BRI	RCH	TAL; 33	CLT	DOV	POC	MCH	IOW	DAY; 26	KEN	NHA	IND	IOW		MOH	BRI	ROA	DAR	RCH	CHI; 30	KEN	DOV	CLT	KAN	TEX	PHO	HOM		
2017	P. J. Jones	25	Chevrolet																				GLN; DNQ															
2018	Chris Cockrum	25	Chevrolet	DAY; DNQ	ATL	LVS	PHO	CAL	TEX	BRI	RCH	TAL	DOV	CLT	POC	MCH	IOW	CHI	DAY	KEN	NHA	IOW	GLN	MOH	BRI	ROA	DAR	IND	LVS	RCH	CLT	DOV	KAN	TEX	PHO	HOM		
2019	Chris Cockrum	17	Chevrolet	DAY; 31	ATL	LVS	PHO	CAL	TEX	BRI	RCH	TAL; 10	DOV	CLT	POC	MCH	IOW	CHI																				
2019	Chris Cockrum	25	Chevrolet																DAY; 19	KEN	NHA	IOW	GLN	MOH	BRI	ROA	DAR	IND	LVS	RCH	CLT	DOV	KAN	TEX	PHO	HOM		
2020	Chris Cockrum	25	Chevrolet	DAY; 34	LVS	CAL	PHO	DAR	CLT	BRI	ATL	HOM	HOM	TAL	POC	IND	KEN	KEN	TEX	KAN	ROA	DAY	DOV	DOV	DAY	DAR	RCH	RCH	BRI	LVS	TAL	CLT	KAN	TEX	MAR	PHO		
2021	Chris Cockrum	25	Chevrolet	DAY; DNQ	DAY	HOM	LVS	PHO	ATL	MAR	TAL	DAR	DOV	COA	CLT	MOH	TEX	NSH	POC	ROA	ATL	NHA	GLN	IND	MCH	DAY	DAR	RCH	BRI	LVS	TAL	CLT	TEX	KAN	MAR	PHO		
^{†} – Qualified but replaced by Austin Theriault
