= Scott Lagasse Jr. =

American racing driver (born 1981)

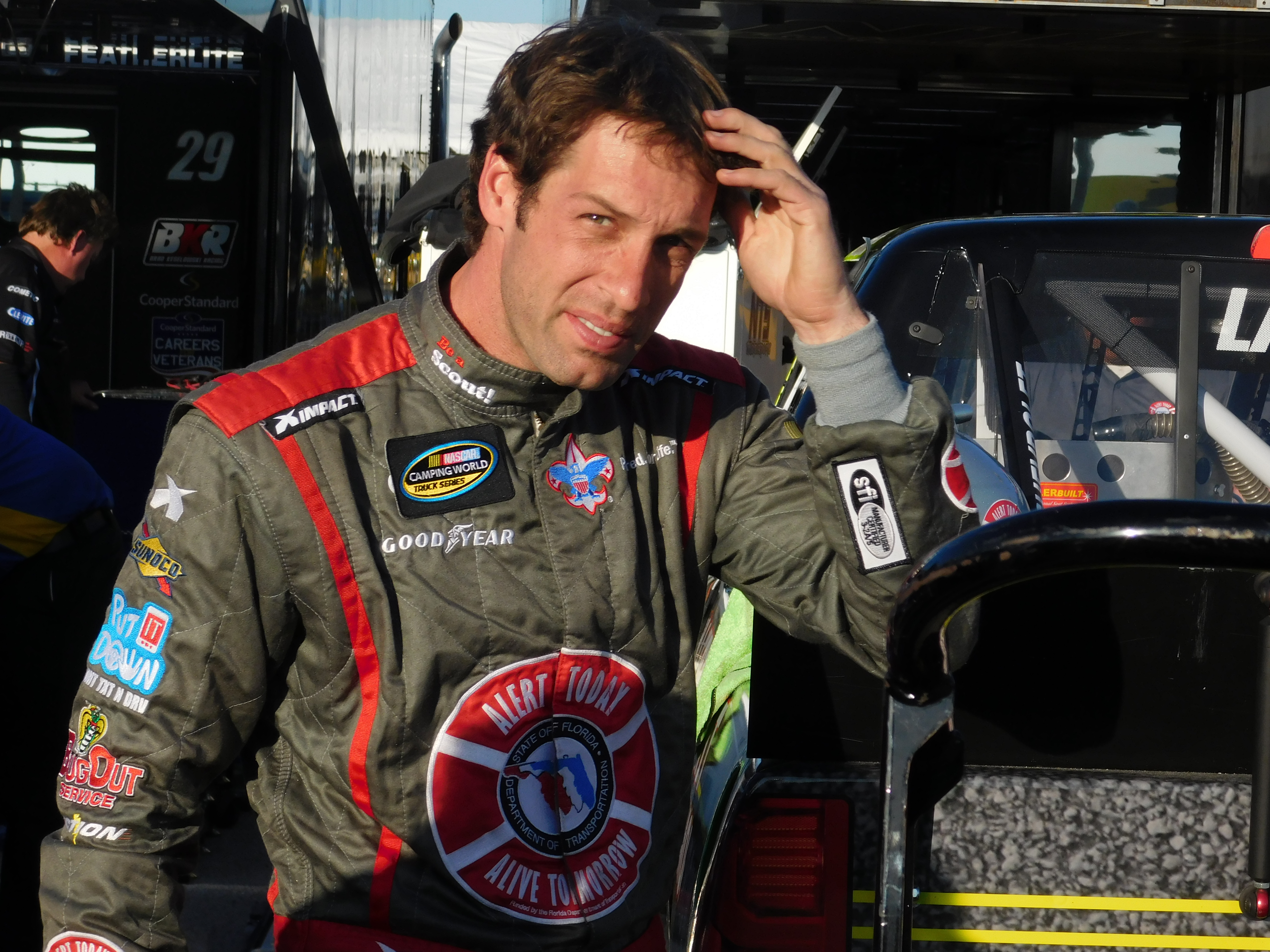
- Lagasse during practice for the 2016 NextEra Energy Resources 250
- Born: Scott Emile Lagasse Jr. January 31, 1981 (age 45); St. Augustine, Florida, U.S.
- Achievements: 1999 Top Gun Challenge Championship; 2001 Late Model Series Champion
- Awards: 2000 Late Model Asphalt Rookie of the Year

NASCAR O'Reilly Auto Parts Series career
- 70 races run over 11 years
- 2019 position: 66th
- Best finish: 21st (2009)
- First race: 2005 Bashas' Supermarkets 200 (Phoenix)
- Last race: 2019 Circle K Firecracker 250 (Daytona)
Wins	Top tens	Poles
0	6	0

NASCAR FedEx Freight Truck Series career
- 31 races run over 8 years
- 2020 position: 54th
- Best finish: 37th (2006)
- First race: 2006 racetickets.com 200 (Fontana)
- Last race: 2020 Sunoco 159 (Daytona RC)
Wins	Top tens	Poles
0	6	0
- Statistics up to date as of November 11, 2020.

Scott Emile Lagasse Jr. (/ˈlæɡəseɪ/; born January 31, 1981) is an American former professional stock car racing driver. He formerly drove in the NASCAR Camping World Truck Series. He is the son of former sports car and NASCAR driver Scott Lagasse Sr.

He is the owner of Scott Lagasse Racing (TeamSLR), which is located in St. Augustine, Florida. TeamSLR currently operates a Trans Am Road Race program, dirt late model race team, show car program and a NASCAR team. The team is currently building a new headquarters in St. Augustine.

== Racing career ==
Lagasse Jr. is a former member of Chip Ganassi Racing's driver development program. He has also driven in a total of 14 ARCA (Automobile Racing Club of America) races in 2006, 2007, 2008 for Cunningham Motorsports and Venturini Motorsports, winning twice – Kansas and Chicagoland Speedway. In 2003 and 2004, besides graduating from college with honors, he was racing dirt cars and competed on a limited schedule in the ASA National Touring Series. In just 12 starts, Lagasse racked up eight top-tens, five top-fives and a win at Kentucky Speedway. From 1998 through 2002 he won over 25 races on dirt and asphalt in modifieds, Sportsman and late models.

Lagasse made his NASCAR Busch Series debut at the Phoenix International Raceway in 2005. He started 33rd while driving the No. 40 Dodge for FitzBradshaw Racing and he finished 40th after he was involved in a crash on the 81st of 200 laps. His best starting position in a part-time season was 18th at the Dover International Speedway, and his best finish was 22nd at the Milwaukee Mile. Lagasse originally was signed by Ganassi for the 2006 Busch Series season, and Dodge wanted to keep him in their camp, so it moved him to a third Truck team at Bobby Hamilton Racing after Ganassi failed to secure sponsorship. He appeared in ten races in 2006 for Hamilton, with a season-best 18th-place finish at the Atlanta Motor Speedway.

In 2007, Lagasse made two Busch Series starts in the No. 41 Juicy Fruit Dodge for Chip Ganassi Racing, and he drove the No. 16 Truck for Xpress Motorsports at Dover, finishing 21st.

Lagasse drove the No. 20 Ford for JTG Racing in the first eight races of the 2008 NASCAR Craftsman Truck Series season; the No. 11 Toyota for 21 NASCAR Nationwide Series races with CJM Racing in 2009, where he posted three top-ten finishes; and the No. 43 Nationwide Ford for 14 races for Baker Curb Racing in 2010, with a season-best eighth-place finish at Phoenix.

Lagasse drove his own SLR Chevrolets in 2012 and 2013, concentrating on both Nationwide Series races at the Daytona International Speedway and the season-finale at Homestead-Miami Speedway, before making two Nationwide starts in 2014 and 2015.

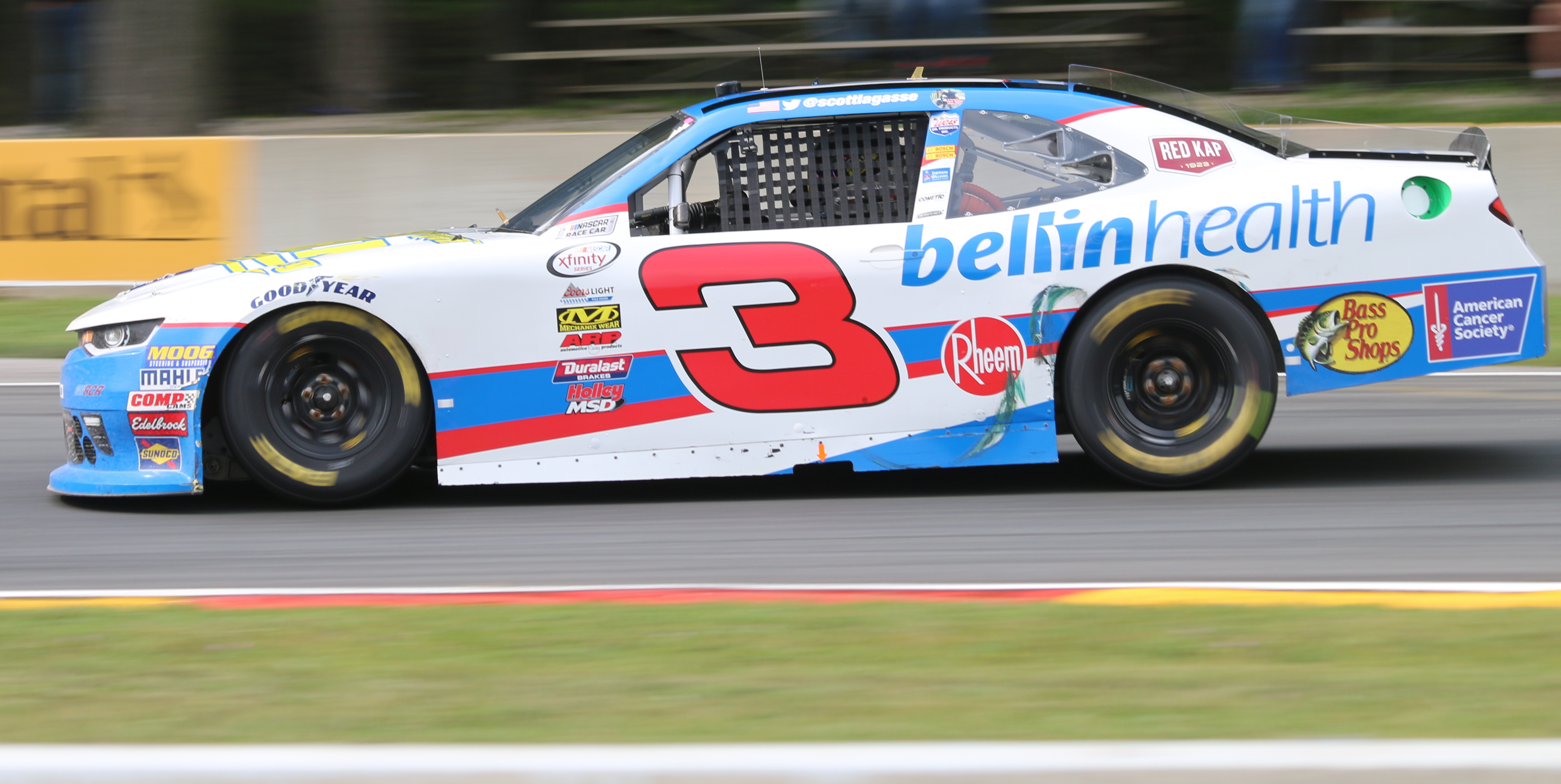
Lagasse in the Childress No. 3 car at Road America in 2017

In 2017, Lagasse joined JGL Racing's No. 24 car at Daytona and also drove the No. 24 truck for GMS Racing in replacement of an ineligible Justin Haley. Later in the year, he was the part-time driver of Richard Childress Racing's No. 3 Xfinity team, splitting the ride with Ty Dillon.

After not racing in the series in 2018, Lagasse returned to the NASCAR Xfinity Series in 2019, driving the No. 4 Chevrolet for JD Motorsports at Daytona. He made his Truck return a year later at the Daytona road course event for On Point Motorsports.

== Cancer survivor ==
In 2015, Lagasse had surgery for colon cancer. He used a bond with fellow-cancer patient Reece King, who fought a rare form of leukemia for three years. Both celebrated their remission by sharing the stage during driver introductions before the 2016 Subway Firecracker 250 Xfinity Series race at the Daytona International Speedway. Lagasse since has forged a relationship with Stand Up to Cancer.

== Personal life ==
Lagasse was born on January 31, 1981, in St. Augustine, Florida. He attended St. Joseph Academy Catholic High School. As a student, Lagasse played basketball before graduating with a Florida academic scholarship. Afterward, he proceeded to pursue an associate's degree at the University of Central Florida, while competing in local off-road and asphalt races on weekends. He continued his education at Flagler College, where he pursued a bachelor's degree in business administration. Lagasse Jr. graduated with honors from Flagler College in 2004, while competing in the American Speed Association National Touring Series.

Lagasse is a spokesperson for Florida Department of Transportation's 'Alert Today Florida' campaign, which raises awareness about pedestrian and bicyclist safety. In 2015, he established a 60-mile (97 km) charity bike event at Daytona International Speedway. The event, called Champions Ride for Bicycle Safety, attracts professional bicyclists, NASCAR drivers, and triathletes to support the 'Alert Today Florida' campaign. He is married to his wife Kelley, and has one daughter, who was born in 2015.

== Motorsports career results ==
=== NASCAR ===
(key) (Bold – Pole position awarded by qualifying time. Italics – Pole position earned by points standings or practice time. * – Most laps led.)

==== Xfinity Series ====
NASCAR Xfinity Series results
Year	Team	No.	Make	1	2	3	4	5	6	7	8	9	10	11	12	13	14	15	16	17	18	19	20	21	22	23	24	25	26	27	28	29	30	31	32	33	34	35	NXSC	Pts	Ref
2005	FitzBradshaw Racing	40	Dodge	DAY	CAL	MXC	LVS	ATL	NSH	BRI	TEX	PHO; 40	TAL	DAR	RCH	CLT	DOV; 42	NSH	KEN	MLW; 22	DAY	CHI	NHA; 40	PPR; 28	GTY	IRP	GLN	MCH	BRI	CAL	RCH	DOV	KAN	CLT	MEM	TEX	PHO	HOM	81st	299	
2007	Chip Ganassi Racing	41	Dodge	DAY	CAL	MXC	LVS	ATL	BRI	NSH	TEX	PHO	TAL	RCH	DAR	CLT	DOV	NSH	KEN	MLW; 35	NHA	DAY	CHI	GTY	IRP; 34	CGV	GLN	MCH	BRI	CAL	RCH	DOV	KAN	CLT	MEM	TEX	PHO	HOM	123rd	119	
2008	CJM Racing	11	Chevy	DAY	CAL	LVS	ATL	BRI	NSH	TEX	PHO	MXC	TAL	RCH	DAR	CLT	DOV	NSH	KEN	MLW	NHA	DAY	CHI	GTY	IRP	CGV	GLN	MCH	BRI	CAL	RCH	DOV; 31	KAN; 20	CLT; 13	MEM; 24	TEX; 25	PHO; 20	HOM; 37	59th	631	
2009	CJM Racing	11	Toyota	DAY; 43	CAL; 12	LVS; 9	BRI; 13	TEX; 16	NSH; 10	PHO; 32	TAL; 8	RCH; 17	DAR; 22	CLT; 32	DOV; 27	NSH; 11	KEN; 13	MLW; 16	NHA; 16	DAY; 18	CHI; 20	GTY; 33	IRP; 37	IOW; 9	GLN	MCH													21st	2194	
2009	Smith-Ganassi Racing	42	Dodge																								BRI; DNQ	CGV	ATL	RCH	DOV	KAN	CAL	CLT	MEM	TEX	PHO	HOM	21st	2194	
2010	Baker Curb Racing	43	Ford	DAY; 32	CAL; 15	LVS; 17	BRI; 13	NSH; 21	PHO; 8	TEX; 24	TAL; 21	RCH; 34	DAR; 36	DOV; 19	CLT; 30	NSH; 33	KEN; 16	ROA	NHA	DAY	CHI	GTY	IRP	IOW	GLN	MCH	BRI	CGV	ATL	RCH	DOV	KAN	CAL	CLT	GTY	TEX	PHO	HOM	37th	1328	
2012	Team SLR	8	Chevy	DAY	PHO	LVS	BRI	CAL	TEX	RCH	TAL	DAR	IOW	CLT	DOV	MCH	ROA	KEN	DAY	NHA	CHI	IND	IOW	GLN	CGV	BRI	ATL	RCH	CHI	KEN; 26	DOV	CLT	KAN; 24	TEX	PHO	HOM; 20			56th	62	
2013	Team SLR	8	Chevy	DAY; 39	PHO	LVS; 20	BRI	CAL	TEX	RCH; 21	TAL	DAR	CLT	DOV	IOW	MCH	ROA	KEN	DAY	NHA	CHI	IND	IOW	GLN	MOH	BRI	ATL	RCH	CHI	KEN	DOV	KAN	CLT	TEX	PHO	HOM			57th	52	
2014	RAB Racing	29	Toyota	DAY; 26	PHO	LVS	BRI	CAL	TEX	DAR	RCH	TAL	IOW	CLT	DOV	MCH	ROA	KEN	DAY; 31	NHA	CHI	IND	IOW	GLN	MOH	BRI	ATL	RCH	CHI	KEN	DOV	KAN	CLT	TEX	PHO	HOM			61st	31	
2015	TriStar Motorsports	19	Toyota	DAY; DNQ																																			74th	14	
2015	TriStar Motorsports	10	Toyota	DAY; 37	ATL	LVS	PHO	CAL	TEX	BRI	RCH	TAL	IOW	CLT	DOV	MCH	CHI																						74th	14	
2015	NTS Motorsports	15	Chevy															DAY; 37	KEN	NHA	IND	IOW	GLN	MOH	BRI	ROA	DAR	RCH	CHI	KEN	DOV	CLT	KAN	TEX	PHO	HOM			74th	14	
2016	RSS Racing	93	Chevy	DAY; 29	ATL	LVS	PHO	CAL	TEX	BRI	RCH	TAL	DOV	CLT	POC	MCH	IOW																						57th	28	
2016	Rick Ware Racing	25	Ford															DAY; 25	KEN	NHA	IND	IOW	GLN	MOH	BRI	ROA	DAR	RCH	CHI	KEN	DOV	CLT	KAN	TEX	PHO	HOM			57th	28	
2017	JGL Racing	24	Toyota	DAY; 6	ATL	LVS	PHO	CAL	TEX	BRI	RCH	TAL; 34	CLT	DOV	POC	MCH																							34th	117	
2017	Richard Childress Racing	3	Chevy														IOW; 32							MOH; 22	BRI	ROA; 23	DAR	RCH	CHI	KEN	DOV	CLT	KAN	TEX	PHO	HOM; 21			34th	117	
2017	JGL Racing	26	Toyota															DAY; 14	KEN	NHA	IND	IOW	GLN																34th	117	
2019	JD Motorsports	4	Chevy	DAY; 21	ATL	LVS	PHO	CAL	TEX	BRI	RCH	TAL	DOV	CLT	POC	MCH	IOW	CHI																					66th	22	
2019	RSS Racing	93	Chevy																DAY; 31	KEN	NHA	IOW	GLN	MOH	BRI	ROA	DAR	IND	LVS	RCH	CLT	DOV	KAN	TEX	PHO	HOM			66th	22	

==== Gander RV & Outdoors Truck Series ====
NASCAR Gander RV & Outdoors Truck Series results
Year	Team	No.	Make	1	2	3	4	5	6	7	8	9	10	11	12	13	14	15	16	17	18	19	20	21	22	23	24	25	NGTC	Pts	Ref
2006	Bobby Hamilton Racing	04	Dodge	DAY	CAL; 30	ATL; 31	MAR	GTY; 21	CLT; 32	MFD; 20	DOV; 35	TEX; 29	MCH	MLW	KAN	KEN	MEM; 26	IRP	NSH	BRI	NHA	LVS	TAL; 34	MAR	ATL; 18	TEX	PHO	HOM	37th	741	
2007	Xpress Motorsports	16	Ford	DAY	CAL	ATL	MAR	KAN	CLT	MFD	DOV; 21	TEX	MCH	MLW	MEM	KEN	IRP	NSH	BRI	GTW	NHA	LVS	TAL	MAR	ATL	TEX	PHO	HOM	90th	100	
2008	JTG Racing	20	Ford	DAY; 26	CAL; 19	ATL; 29	MAR; 23	KAN; 30	CLT; 27	MFD; 33	DOV; 26	TEX	MCH	MLW	MEM	KEN	IRP	NSH	BRI	GTW	NHA	LVS	TAL	MAR	ATL	TEX	PHO	HOM	38th	665	
2015	NTS Motorsports	20	Chevy	DAY; 3	ATL	MAR																							89th	0^{1}	
2015	NTS Motorsports	31	Chevy				KAN; 8	CLT; 12	DOV	TEX	GTW	IOW	KEN	ELD	POC	MCH	BRI	MSP	CHI	NHA	LVS	TAL	MAR	TEX	PHO				89th	0^{1}	
2015	NTS Motorsports	0	Chevy																							HOM; 15			89th	0^{1}	
2016	NTS Motorsports	14	Chevy	DAY; 9	ATL	MAR	KAN	DOV	CLT	TEX	IOW	GTW	KEN	ELD	POC	BRI	MCH	MSP	CHI	NHA	LVS	TAL	MAR	TEX	PHO				88th	0^{1}	
2016	Young's Motorsports	02	Chevy																							HOM; 22			88th	0^{1}	
2017	GMS Racing	24	Chevy	DAY; 7	ATL	MAR	KAN	CLT	DOV	TEX	GTW																		81st	0^{1}	
2017	Young's Motorsports	02	Chevy									IOW; 13	KEN	ELD	POC	MCH	BRI	MSP	CHI	NHA	LVS	TAL	MAR	TEX	PHO	HOM			81st	0^{1}	
2018	Young's Motorsports	20	Chevy	DAY; 5	ATL	LVS	MAR	DOV	KAN	CLT	TEX	IOW	GTW	CHI	KEN	ELD	POC	MCH											95th	0^{1}	
2018	On Point Motorsports	30	Toyota																BRI; 31	MSP	LVS	TAL; 18	MAR	TEX	PHO	HOM			95th	0^{1}	
2020	On Point Motorsports	30	Toyota	DAY	LVS	CLT	ATL	HOM	POC	KEN	TEX	KAN	KAN	MCH	DRC; 9	DOV	GTW	DAR	RCH	BRI	LVS	TAL	KAN	TEX	MAR	PHO			54th	28	

^{*} Season still in progress
^{1} Ineligible for series points

=== ARCA Racing Series ===
(key) (Bold – Pole position awarded by qualifying time. Italics – Pole position earned by points standings or practice time. * – Most laps led.)

ARCA Racing Series results
Year	Team	No.	Make	1	2	3	4	5	6	7	8	9	10	11	12	13	14	15	16	17	18	19	20	21	22	23	ARSC	Pts	Ref
2006	Cunningham Motorsports	4	Dodge	DAY; 29	NSH	SLM	WIN	KEN; 34	TOL; 19	POC	MCH; 9	KAN; 26*	KEN; 11	BLN	POC	GTW	NSH; 6	MCH; 12	ISF	MIL	TOL	DSF	CHI; 3	SLM	TAL	IOW	32nd	1370	
2007	Cunningham Motorsports	4	Dodge	DAY; 8	USA			KAN; 1*	WIN	KEN; 4	TOL	IOW	POC	MCH	BLN	KEN	POC	NSH	ISF	MIL	GTW	DSF	CHI	SLM	TAL	TOL	43rd	780	
2007	Mark Gibson Racing	13	Dodge			NSH; 4	SLM																				43rd	780	
2008	Venturini Motorsports	25	Chevy	DAY	SLM	IOW	KAN	CAR	KEN	TOL	POC	MCH	CAY	KEN	BLN	POC	NSH	ISF	DSF	CHI; 1	SLM	NJE	TAL	TOL			82nd	240	
2011	Venturini Motorsports	25	Toyota	DAY	TAL; 8	SLM	TOL	NJE	CHI	POC	MCH	WIN	BLN	IOW	IRP	POC	ISF	MAD	DSF	SLM							66th	345	
2011	Venturini Motorsports	20	Chevy																		KAN; 15	TOL					66th	345	
2013	Cunningham Motorsports	22	Dodge	DAY	MOB	SLM	TAL	TOL	ELK	POC	MCH	ROA	WIN	CHI	NJE	POC	BLN	ISF	MAD	DSF	IOW	SLM	KEN	KAN; 27			73rd	350	
