= 2021 Beef. It's What's for Dinner. 300 =

2021 Beef. It's What's For Dinner 300
Race details
- Race 1 of 33 in the 2021 NASCAR Xfinity Series season
- Daytona International Speedway
- Date: February 13, 2021
- Location: Daytona International Speedway in Daytona Beach, Florida
- Course: Permanent racing facility
- Course length: 2.5 miles (4.023 km)
- Distance: 122 laps, 305 mi (490.850 km)
- Scheduled distance: 120 laps, 300 mi (482.803 km)
- Average speed: 118.677 miles per hour (190.992 km/h)

Pole position
Driver	Austin Cindric	Team Penske
- Grid positions set by competition-based formula

Most laps led
Driver	Austin Cindric	Team Penske
- Laps: 28

Winner
No. 22	Austin Cindric	Team Penske

Television in the United States
- Network: FS1
- Announcers: Adam Alexander, Clint Bowyer, and Tony Stewart

The 2021 Beef. It's What's For Dinner. 300 was a NASCAR Xfinity Series race held on February 13, 2021. It was contested over 122 laps—extended from 120 laps due to an overtime finish—on the 2.5-mile (4.0 km) asphalt superspeedway. It was the first race of the 2021 NASCAR Xfinity Series season. Team Penske driver Austin Cindric, the reigning Xfinty Series champion, collected his first win of the season.

== Background ==
Daytona International Speedway is one of three superspeedways to hold NASCAR races, the other two being Indianapolis Motor Speedway and Talladega Superspeedway. The standard track at Daytona International Speedway is a four-turn superspeedway that is 2.5 miles (4.0 km) long. The track's turns are banked at 31 degrees, while the front stretch, the location of the finish line, is banked at 18 degrees.

== Entry list ==
- (R) denotes rookie driver.
- (i) denotes driver who is ineligible for series driver points.

No.	Driver	Team	Manufacturer
0	Jeffrey Earnhardt	JD Motorsports	Chevrolet
1	Michael Annett	JR Motorsports	Chevrolet
02	Brett Moffitt (i)	Our Motorsports	Chevrolet
2	Myatt Snider	Richard Childress Racing	Chevrolet
03	Tyler Reddick (i)	Our Motorsports	Chevrolet
4	Landon Cassill	JD Motorsports	Chevrolet
5	Matt Mills	B. J. McLeod Motorsports	Chevrolet
6	Ryan Vargas (R)	JD Motorsports	Chevrolet
7	Justin Allgaier	JR Motorsports	Chevrolet
07	Joe Graf Jr.	SS-Green Light Racing	Chevrolet
8	Josh Berry (R)	JR Motorsports	Chevrolet
9	Noah Gragson	JR Motorsports	Chevrolet
10	Jeb Burton	Kaulig Racing	Chevrolet
11	Justin Haley	Kaulig Racing	Chevrolet
13	Chad Finchum	MBM Motorsports	Ford
15	Colby Howard	JD Motorsports	Chevrolet
16	A. J. Allmendinger	Kaulig Racing	Chevrolet
17	Cody Ware (I)	SS-Green Light Racing with Rick Ware Racing	Chevrolet
18	Daniel Hemric	Joe Gibbs Racing	Toyota
19	Brandon Jones	Joe Gibbs Racing	Toyota
20	Harrison Burton	Joe Gibbs Racing	Toyota
22	Austin Cindric	Team Penske	Ford
23	Jason White	RSS Racing with Reaume Brothers Racing	Chevrolet
25	Chris Cockrum	ACG Motorsports	Chevrolet
26	Brandon Gdovic	Sam Hunt Racing	Toyota
31	Jordan Anderson	Jordan Anderson Racing	Chevrolet
36	Alex Labbé	DGM Racing	Chevrolet
39	Ryan Sieg	RSS Racing	Ford
44	Tommy Joe Martins	Martins Motorsports	Chevrolet
47	Kyle Weatherman	Mike Harmon Racing	Chevrolet
48	Danny Bohn (I)	Big Machine Racing	Chevrolet
51	Jeremy Clements	Jeremy Clements Racing	Chevrolet
52	Gray Gaulding	Jimmy Means Racing	Chevrolet
54	Ty Dillon	Joe Gibbs Racing	Toyota
61	Robby Lyons	Hattori Racing Enterprises	Toyota
66	Timmy Hill (I)	MBM Motorsports	Ford
68	Brandon Brown	Brandonbilt Motorsports	Chevrolet
74	Bayley Currey (I)	Mike Harmon Racing	Chevrolet
77	Ronnie Bassett Jr.	Bassett Racing	Chevrolet
78	Jesse Little	B. J. McLeod Motorsports	Chevrolet
90	Caesar Bacarella	DGM Racing	Chevrolet
91	Mario Gosselin	DGM Racing	Chevrolet
92	Josh Williams	DGM Racing	Chevrolet
98	Riley Herbst	Stewart-Haas Racing	Ford
99	Stefan Parsons	B. J. McLeod Motorsports	Toyota
Official entry list

== Practice ==
Ty Dillon was the fastest in the first practice session with a time of 46.691 seconds and a speed of 192.757 mph (310.212 km/h).

Pos	No.	Driver	Team	Manufacturer	Time	Speed
1	54	Ty Dillon	Joe Gibbs Racing	Toyota	46.691	192.757
2	98	Riley Herbst	Stewart-Haas Racing	Ford	46.756	192.489
3	22	Austin Cindric	Team Penske	Ford	46.783	192.378
Official first practice results

== Qualifying ==
Austin Cindric was awarded the pole for the race as determined by 2020 owner points. Chris Cockrum, Ronnie Bassett Jr., Mario Gosselin, Tyler Reddick, and Jordan Anderson did not qualify.

=== Starting Lineups ===
Pos	No	Driver	Team	Manufacturer
1	22	Austin Cindric	Team Penske	Ford
2	7	Justin Allgaier	JR Motorsports	Chevrolet
3	11	Justin Haley	Kaulig Racing	Chevrolet
4	98	Riley Herbst	Stewart-Haas Racing	Ford
5	9	Noah Gragson	JR Motorsports	Chevrolet
6	19	Brandon Jones	Joe Gibbs Racing	Toyota
7	10	Jeb Burton	Kaulig Racing	Chevrolet
8	20	Harrison Burton (R)	Joe Gibbs Racing	Toyota
9	8	Josh Berry(R)	JR Motorsports	Chevrolet
10	1	Michael Annett	JR Motorsports	Chevrolet
11	2	Myatt Snider	Richard Childress Racing	Chevrolet
12	18	Daniel Hemric	Joe Gibbs Racing	Toyota
13	39	Ryan Sieg	RSS Racing	Ford
14	68	Brandon Brown	DGM Racing	Chevrolet
15	02	Brett Moffitt(I)	Our Motorsports	Chevrolet
16	51	Jeremy Clements	Jeremy Clements Racing	Chevrolet
17	92	Josh Williams	DGM Racing	Chevrolet
18	07	Joe Graf Jr.	SS-Green Light Racing	Chevrolet
19	36	Alex Labbé	DGM Racing	Chevrolet
20	15	Colby Howard	JD Motorsports	Chevrolet
21	6	Ryan Vargas(R)	JD Motorsports	Chevrolet
22	44	Tommy Joe Martins	Martins Motorsports	Chevrolet
23	61	Robby Lyons	Hattori Racing Enterprises	Toyota
24	78	Jesse Little	B. J. McLeod Motorsports	Chevrolet
25	0	Jeffrey Earnhardt	JD Motorsports	Chevrolet
26	13	Chad Finchum	MBM Motorsports	Ford
27	5	Matt Mills	B. J. McLeod Motorsports	Chevrolet
28	48	Danny Bohn (i)	Big Machine Racing	Chevrolet
29	17	Cody Ware(I)	SS-Green Light Racing with Rick Ware Racing	Chevrolet
30	74	Bayley Currey(I)	Mike Harmon Racing	Chevrolet
31	16	A. J. Allmendinger	Kaulig Racing	Chevrolet
32	54	Ty Dillon	Joe Gibbs Racing	Toyota
33	4	Landon Cassill	JD Motorsports	Chevrolet
34	47	Kyle Weatherman	Mike Harmon Racing	Chevrolet
35	52	Gray Gaulding	Jimmy Means Racing	Chevrolet
36	99	Stefan Parsons	B. J. McLeod Motorsports	Chevrolet
37	66	Timmy Hill(I)	MBM Motorsports	Ford
38	90	Caesar Bacarella	DGM Racing	Chevrolet
39	26	Brandon Gdovic	Sam Hunt Racing	Toyota
40	23	Jason White	Our Motorsports	Chevrolet
Official qualifying results

== Race ==
=== Race results ===
==== Stage Results ====
Stage One Laps: 30

Pos	No	Driver	Team	Manufacturer	Points
1	19	Brandon Jones	Joe Gibbs Racing	Toyota	10
2	98	Riley Herbst	Stewart-Haas Racing	Ford	9
3	54	Ty Dillon	Joe Gibbs Racing	Toyota	8
4	22	Austin Cindric	Team Penske	Ford	7
5	9	Noah Gragson	JR Motorsports	Chevrolet	6
6	18	Daniel Hemric	Joe Gibbs Racing	Toyota	5
7	7	Justin Allgaier	JR Motorsports	Chevrolet	4
8	20	Harrison Burton	Joe Gibbs Racing	Toyota	3
9	39	Ryan Sieg	RSS Racing	Ford	2
10	68	Brandon Brown	Brandonbilt Motorsports	Chevrolet	1

Stage Two Laps: 30

Pos	No	Driver	Team	Manufacturer	Points
1	02	Brett Moffitt	Our Motorsports	Chevrolet	10
2	54	Ty Dillon	Joe Gibbs Racing	Toyota	9
3	22	Austin Cindric	Team Penske	Ford	8
4	11	Justin Haley	Kaulig Racing	Chevrolet	7
5	68	Brandon Brown	Brandonbilt Motorsports	Chevrolet	6
6	39	Ryan Sieg	RSS Racing	Ford	5
7	51	Jeremy Clements	Jeremy Clements Racing	Chevrolet	4
8	2	Myatt Snider	Richard Childress Racing	Chevrolet	3
9	9	Noah Gragson	JR Motorsports	Chevrolet	2
10	8	Josh Berry(R)	JR Motorsports	Chevrolet	1

=== Final Stage Results ===
Laps: 60

Pos	Grid	No	Driver	Team	Manufacturer	Laps	Points	Status
1	1	22	Austin Cindric	Team Penske	Ford	122	55	Running
2	15	02	Brett Moffitt	Our Motorsports	Chevrolet	122	0	Running
3	8	20	Harrison Burton	Joe Gibbs Racing	Toyota	122	37	Running
4	7	10	Jeb Burton	Kaulig Racing	Chevrolet	122	33	Running
5	31	16	A. J. Allmendinger	Kaulig Racing	Chevrolet	122	32	Running
6	14	68	Brandon Brown	Brandonbilt Motorsports	Chevrolet	122	46	Running
7	11	2	Myatt Snider	Richard Childress Racing	Chevrolet	122	33	Running
8	39	26	Brandon Gdovic	Sam Hunt Racing	Toyota	122	29	Running
9	12	18	Daniel Hemric	Joe Gibbs Racing	Toyota	122	33	Running
10	40	23	Jason White	RSS Racing with Reaume Brothers Racing	Chevrolet	122	27	Running
11	18	07	Joe Graf Jr.	SS-Green Light Racing	Chevrolet	122	26	Running
12	38	90	Caesar Bacarella	DGM Racing	Chevrolet	122	25	Running
13	36	99	Stefan Parsons	B. J. McLeod Motorsports	Chevrolet	122	24	Running
14	32	54	Ty Dillon	Joe Gibbs Racing	Toyota	122	40	Running
15	34	47	Kyle Weatherman	Mike Harmon Racing	Chevrolet	122	22	Running
16	27	5	Matt Mills	B. J. McLeod Motorsports	Chevrolet	122	21	Running
17	24	78	Jesse Little	B. J. McLeod Motorsports	Chevrolet	122	20	Running
18	21	6	Ryan Vargas	JD Motorsports	Chevrolet	122	19	Running
19	28	48	Danny Bohn (I)	Big Machine Racing	Chevrolet	122	0	Running
20	37	66	Timmy Hill	MBM Motorsports	Ford	121	17	Running
21	17	92	Josh Williams	DGM Racing	Chevrolet	120	16	Running
22	16	51	Jeremy Clements	Jeremy Clements Racing	Chevrolet	120	19	Running
23	33	4	Landon Cassill	JD Motorsports	Chevrolet	114	14	Accident
24	22	44	Tommy Joe Martins	Martins Motorsports	Chevrolet	114	13	Accident
25	23	61	Robby Lyons	Hattori Racing Enterprises	Toyota	105	12	Accident
26	4	98	Riley Herbst	Stewart-Haas Racing	Ford	105	20	Accident
27	9	8	Josh Berry(R)	JR Motorsports	Chevrolet	104	11	Running
28	2	7	Justin Allgaier	JR Motorsports	Chevrolet	104	13	Running
29	3	11	Justin Haley	Kaulig Racing	Chevrolet	104	15	Accident
30	26	13	Chad Finchum	MBM Motorsports	Ford	104	7	Accident
31	13	39	Ryan Sieg	RSS Racing	Ford	81	13	DVP
32	5	9	Noah Gragson	JR Motorsports	Chevrolet	76	13	Accident
33	30	74	Bayley Currey(I)	Mike Harmon Racing	Chevrolet	75	0	Accident
34	35	52	Gray Gaulding	Means Motorsports	Chevrolet	75	3	Accident
35	20	15	Colby Howard	JD Motorsports	Chevrolet	75	2	Accident
36	10	1	Michael Annett	JR Motorsports	Chevrolet	74	1	Accident
37	25	0	Jeffrey Earnhardt	JD Motorsports	Chevrolet	74	1	Accident
38	6	19	Brandon Jones	Joe Gibbs Racing	Toyota	60	11	Accident
39	29	17	Cody Ware (I)	SS-Green Light Racing with Rick Ware Racing	Chevrolet	60	0	Accident
40	19	36	Alex Labbe	DGM Racing	Chevrolet	60	1	Accident
Official race results

=== Race statistics ===
- Lead changes: 16 among 11 different drivers
- Cautions/Laps: 9 for 42
- Red flags: 1
- Time of race: 2 hours, 34 minutes, and 12 seconds
- Average speed: 118.677 mph (190.992 km/h)

Previous race: 2020 Desert Diamond Casino West Valley 200	NASCAR Xfinity Series; 2021 season	Next race: 2021 Super Start Batteries 188
