= 2019 NASCAR Racing Experience 300 =

Race details
- Race 1 of 33 in the 2019 NASCAR Xfinity Series season
- Date: February 16, 2019
- Location: Daytona International Speedway in Daytona Beach, Florida
- Course: Permanent racing facility
- Course length: 2.5 miles (4 km)
- Distance: 120 laps, 300 mi (480 km)

Pole position
Driver	Tyler Reddick	Richard Childress Racing
- Time: 47.604

Most laps led
Driver	Michael Annett	JR Motorsports
- Laps: 45

Winner
No. 1	Michael Annett	JR Motorsports

Television in the United States
- Network: FS1

Radio in the United States
- Radio: MRN

The 2019 NASCAR Racing Experience 300 was a NASCAR Xfinity Series race held on February 16, 2019, contested over 120 laps, on the 2.5-mile (4.0 km) asphalt superspeedway. It was the first race of the 2019 NASCAR Xfinity Series season.

== Entry list ==
No.	Driver	Team	Manufacturer
00	Cole Custer	Stewart-Haas Racing with Biagi-DenBeste Racing	Ford
0	Garrett Smithley	JD Motorsports	Chevrolet
01	Stephen Leicht	JD Motorsports	Chevrolet
1	Michael Annett	JR Motorsports	Chevrolet
2	Tyler Reddick	Richard Childress Racing	Chevrolet
4	Scott Lagasse Jr.	JD Motorsports	Chevrolet
5	Matt Mills (R)	B. J. McLeod Motorsports	Toyota
07	Ray Black Jr.	SS-Green Light Racing	Chevrolet
7	Justin Allgaier	JR Motorsports	Chevrolet
08	Gray Gaulding (R)	SS-Green Light Racing	Chevrolet
8	Chase Elliott (i)	JR Motorsports	Chevrolet
9	Noah Gragson (R)	JR Motorsports	Chevrolet
10	Ross Chastain	Kaulig Racing	Chevrolet
11	Justin Haley (R)	Kaulig Racing	Chevrolet
12	Brad Keselowski (i)	Team Penske	Ford
13	Max Tullman	MBM Motorsports	Toyota
15	B. J. McLeod	JD Motorsports	Chevrolet
17	Chris Cockrum	ACG Motorsports	Chevrolet
18	Jeffrey Earnhardt	Joe Gibbs Racing	Toyota
19	Brandon Jones	Joe Gibbs Racing	Toyota
20	Christopher Bell	Joe Gibbs Racing	Toyota
22	Austin Cindric	Team Penske	Ford
23	John Hunter Nemechek (R)	GMS Racing	Chevrolet
35	Joey Gase	MBM Motorsports	Toyota
36	Josh Williams	DGM Racing	Chevrolet
38	Josh Bilicki	RSS Racing	Chevrolet
39	Ryan Sieg	RSS Racing	Chevrolet
42	John Jackson	MBM Motorsports	Toyota
51	Jeremy Clements	Jeremy Clements Racing	Chevrolet
52	David Starr	Jimmy Means Racing	Chevrolet
66	Timmy Hill	MBM Motorsports	Toyota
74	Mike Harmon	Mike Harmon Racing	Chevrolet
78	Vinnie Miller	B. J. McLeod Motorsports	Toyota
86	Brandon Brown (R)	Brandonbilt Motorsports	Chevrolet
90	Caesar Bacarella	DGM Racing	Chevrolet
93	Jeff Green	RSS Racing	Chevrolet
98	Chase Briscoe (R)	Stewart-Haas Racing with Biagi-DenBeste Racing	Ford
99	D. J. Kennington	B. J. McLeod Motorsports	Toyota

== Practice ==
=== First practice ===
Chase Briscoe was the fastest in the first practice session with a time of 45.812 seconds and a speed of 196.455 mph (316.164 km/h).

Pos	No.	Driver	Team	Manufacturer	Time	Speed
1	98	Chase Briscoe (R)	Stewart-Haas Racing with Biagi-DenBeste Racing	Ford	47.014	191.432
2	2	Tyler Reddick	Richard Childress Racing	Chevrolet	45.838	196.344
3	23	John Hunter Nemechek (R)	GMS Racing	Chevrolet	45.871	196.202

=== Final practice ===
Justin Haley was the fastest in the final practice session with a time of 47.473 seconds and a speed of 189.581 mph (305.101 km/h).

Pos	No.	Driver	Team	Manufacturer	Time	Speed
1	11	Justin Haley (R)	Kaulig Racing	Chevrolet	47.473	189.581
2	9	Noah Gragson (R)	JR Motorsports	Chevrolet	47.684	188.743
3	39	Ryan Sieg	RSS Racing	Chevrolet	47.798	188.292

== Qualifying ==
Tyler Reddick scored the pole for the race with a time of 47.604 seconds and a speed of 189.060 mph (304.263 km/h).

=== Qualifying results ===
Pos	No	Driver	Team	Manufacturer	R1	R2
1	2	Tyler Reddick	Richard Childress Racing	Chevrolet	47.661	47.604
2	18	Jeffrey Earnhardt	Joe Gibbs Racing	Toyota	48.043	47.703
3	1	Michael Annett	JR Motorsports	Chevrolet	48.004	47.739
4	11	Justin Haley (R)	Kaulig Racing	Chevrolet	47.851	47.803
5	08	Gray Gaulding (R)	SS-Green Light Racing	Chevrolet	47.887	47.868
6	10	Ross Chastain	Kaulig Racing	Chevrolet	47.963	47.875
7	8	Chase Elliott (i)	JR Motorsports	Chevrolet	48.093	47.887
8	39	Ryan Sieg	RSS Racing	Chevrolet	47.880	47.893
9	12	Brad Keselowski (i)	Team Penske	Ford	48.143	47.895
10	98	Chase Briscoe (R)	Stewart-Haas Racing with Biagi-DenBeste Racing	Ford	48.111	47.937
11	20	Christopher Bell	Joe Gibbs Racing	Toyota	48.148	47.958
12	90	Caesar Bacarella	DGM Racing	Chevrolet	48.166	48.033
13	22	Austin Cindric	Team Penske	Ford	48.216	—
14	23	John Hunter Nemechek (R)	GMS Racing	Chevrolet	48.321	—
15	7	Justin Allgaier	JR Motorsports	Chevrolet	48.347	—
16	19	Brandon Jones	Joe Gibbs Racing	Toyota	48.361	—
17	4	Scott Lagasse Jr.	JD Motorsports	Chevrolet	48.387	—
18	9	Noah Gragson (R)	JR Motorsports	Chevrolet	48.460	—
19	17	Chris Cockrum	ACG Motorsports	Chevrolet	48.712	—
20	38	Josh Bilicki	RSS Racing	Chevrolet	48.774	—
21	93	Jeff Green	RSS Racing	Chevrolet	48.776	—
22	66	Timmy Hill	MBM Motorsports	Toyota	48.779	—
23	01	Stephen Leicht	JD Motorsports	Chevrolet	48.854	—
24	36	Josh Williams	DGM Racing	Chevrolet	48.971	—
25	51	Jeremy Clements	Jeremy Clements Racing	Chevrolet	49.002	—
26	0	Garrett Smithley	JD Motorsports	Chevrolet	49.031	—
27	99	D. J. Kennington	B. J. McLeod Motorsports	Toyota	49.075	—
28	86	Brandon Brown (R)	Brandonbilt Motorsports	Chevrolet	49.201	—
29	78	Vinnie Miller	B. J. McLeod Motorsports	Toyota	49.237	—
30	35	Joey Gase	MBM Motorsports	Toyota	49.264	—
31	5	Matt Mills (R)	B. J. McLeod Motorsports	Toyota	49.287	—
32	52	David Starr	Jimmy Means Racing	Chevrolet	49.383	—
33	07	Ray Black Jr.	SS-Green Light Racing	Chevrolet	49.426	—
34	13	Max Tullman	MBM Motorsports	Toyota	49.549	—
35	15	B. J. McLeod	JD Motorsports	Chevrolet	49.620	—
36	74	Mike Harmon	Mike Harmon Racing	Chevrolet	49.699	—
37	42	John Jackson	MBM Motorsports	Toyota	49.914	—
38	00	Cole Custer	Stewart-Haas Racing with Biagi-DenBeste Racing	Ford	49.992	—

== Race ==
=== Race results ===
==== Stage Results ====
Stage One Laps: 30

Pos	No	Driver	Team	Manufacturer	Points
1	11	Justin Haley (R)	Kaulig Racing	Chevrolet	10
2	10	Ross Chastain	Kaulig Racing	Chevrolet	9
3	23	John Hunter Nemechek (R)	GMS Racing	Chevrolet	8
4	18	Jeffrey Earnhardt	Joe Gibbs Racing	Toyota	7
5	19	Brandon Jones	Joe Gibbs Racing	Toyota	6
6	9	Noah Gragson (R)	JR Motorsports	Chevrolet	5
7	39	Ryan Sieg	RSS Racing	Chevrolet	4
8	20	Christopher Bell	Joe Gibbs Racing	Toyota	3
9	2	Tyler Reddick	Richard Childress Racing	Chevrolet	2
10	22	Austin Cindric	Team Penske	Ford	1

Stage Two Laps: 30

Pos	No	Driver	Team	Manufacturer	Points
1	10	Ross Chastain	Kaulig Racing	Chevrolet	10
2	19	Brandon Jones	Joe Gibbs Racing	Toyota	9
3	22	Austin Cindric	Team Penske	Ford	8
4	8	Chase Elliott (i)	JR Motorsports	Chevrolet	0
5	18	Jeffrey Earnhardt	Joe Gibbs Racing	Toyota	6
6	20	Christopher Bell	Joe Gibbs Racing	Toyota	5
7	7	Justin Allgaier	JR Motorsports	Chevrolet	4
8	2	Tyler Reddick	Richard Childress Racing	Chevrolet	3
9	1	Michael Annett	JR Motorsports	Chevrolet	2
10	11	Justin Haley (R)	Kaulig Racing	Chevrolet	1

=== Final Stage Results ===
Laps: 60

Pos	Grid	No	Driver	Team	Manufacturer	Laps	Points	Status
1	3	1	Michael Annett	JR Motorsports	Chevrolet	120	42	Running
2	15	7	Justin Allgaier	JR Motorsports	Chevrolet	120	39	Running
3	16	19	Brandon Jones	Joe Gibbs Racing	Toyota	120	49	Running
4	8	39	Ryan Sieg	RSS Racing	Chevrolet	120	37	Running
5	13	22	Austin Cindric	Team Penske	Ford	120	41	Running
6	11	20	Christopher Bell	Joe Gibbs Racing	Toyota	120	39	Running
7	21	93	Jeff Green	RSS Racing	Chevrolet	120	30	Running
8	14	23	John Hunter Nemechek (R)	GMS Racing	Chevrolet	120	37	Running
9	1	2	Tyler Reddick	Richard Childress Racing	Chevrolet	120	33	Running
10	7	8	Chase Elliott (i)	JR Motorsports	Chevrolet	120	0	Running
11	18	9	Noah Gragson (R)	JR Motorsports	Chevrolet	120	31	Running
12	10	98	Chase Briscoe (R)	Stewart-Haas Racing with Biagi-DenBeste Racing	Ford	120	25	Running
13	6	10	Ross Chastain	Kaulig Racing	Chevrolet	120	43	Running
14	38	00	Cole Custer	Stewart-Haas Racing with Biagi-DenBeste Racing	Ford	120	23	Running
15	2	18	Jeffrey Earnhardt	Joe Gibbs Racing	Toyota	120	35	Running
16	30	35	Joey Gase	MBM Motorsports	Toyota	120	21	Running
17	4	11	Justin Haley (R)	Kaulig Racing	Chevrolet	120	31	Running
18	28	86	Brandon Brown (R)	Brandonbilt Motorsports	Chevrolet	120	19	Running
19	22	66	Timmy Hill	MBM Motorsports	Toyota	120	18	Running
20	32	52	David Starr	Jimmy Means Racing	Chevrolet	120	17	Running
21	17	4	Scott Lagasse Jr.	JD Motorsports	Chevrolet	120	16	Running
22	24	36	Josh Williams	DGM Racing	Chevrolet	120	15	Running
23	20	38	Josh Bilicki	RSS Racing	Chevrolet	120	14	Running
24	26	0	Garrett Smithley	JD Motorsports	Chevrolet	120	13	Running
25	29	78	Vinnie Miller	B. J. McLeod Motorsports	Toyota	120	12	Running
26	31	5	Matt Mills (R)	B. J. McLeod Motorsports	Toyota	120	11	Running
27	35	15	B. J. McLeod	JD Motorsports	Chevrolet	120	10	Running
28	34	13	Max Tullman	MBM Motorsports	Toyota	120	9	Running
29	12	90	Caesar Bacarella	DGM Racing	Chevrolet	119	8	Running
30	33	07	Ray Black Jr.	SS-Green Light Racing	Chevrolet	119	7	Running
31	19	17	Chris Cockrum	ACG Motorsports	Chevrolet	118	6	Running
32	37	42	John Jackson	MBM Motorsports	Toyota	118	5	Running
33	27	99	D. J. Kennington	B. J. McLeod Motorsports	Toyota	113	4	Running
34	5	08	Gray Gaulding (R)	SS-Green Light Racing	Chevrolet	110	3	Running
35	36	74	Mike Harmon	Mike Harmon Racing	Chevrolet	108	2	Running
36	25	51	Jeremy Clements	Jeremy Clements Racing	Chevrolet	90	1	Engine
37	9	12	Brad Keselowski (i)	Team Penske	Ford	71	0	Roof Hatch
38	23	01	Stephen Leicht	JD Motorsports	Chevrolet	24	1	Overheating

Previous race: 2018 Ford EcoBoost 300	NASCAR Xfinity Series; 2019 season	Next race: 2019 Rinnai 250
