= 2019 Circle K Firecracker 250 =

Race details
- Race 16 of 33 in the 2019 NASCAR Xfinity Series season
- Date: July 5, 2019
- Location: Daytona International Speedway in Daytona Beach, Florida
- Course: Permanent racing facility
- Course length: 2.5 miles (4 km)
- Distance: 100 laps, 250 mi (400 km)

Pole position
Driver	Tyler Reddick	Richard Childress Racing
- Time: 47.938

Most laps led
Driver	Ross Chastain	Kaulig Racing
- Laps: 49

Winner
No. 16	Ross Chastain	Kaulig Racing

Television in the United States
- Network: NBCSN

Radio in the United States
- Radio: MRN

The 2019 Circle K Firecracker 250 was a NASCAR Xfinity Series race held on July 5, 2019, at Daytona International Speedway in Daytona Beach, Florida. Contested over 100 laps on the 2.5-mile (4.0 km) superspeedway, it was the 16th race of the 2019 NASCAR Xfinity Series season.

== Background ==
=== Track ===
Daytona International Speedway, the site of the race.

The race was held at Daytona International Speedway, a race track located in Daytona Beach, Florida, United States. Since opening in 1959, the track is the home of the Daytona 500, the most prestigious race in NASCAR. In addition to NASCAR, the track also hosts races of ARCA, AMA Superbike, USCC, SCCA, and Motocross. It features multiple layouts including the primary 2.5 miles (4.0 km) high speed tri-oval, a 3.56 miles (5.73 km) sports car course, a 2.95 miles (4.75 km) motorcycle course, and a .25 miles (0.40 km) karting and motorcycle flat-track. The track's 180-acre (73 ha) infield includes the 29-acre (12 ha) Lake Lloyd, which has hosted powerboat racing. The speedway is owned and operated by International Speedway Corporation.

== Entry list ==
No.	Driver	Team	Manufacturer
00	Cole Custer	Stewart-Haas Racing with Biagi-DenBeste Racing	Ford
0	Garrett Smithley	JD Motorsports	Chevrolet
01	Stephen Leicht	JD Motorsports	Chevrolet
1	Michael Annett	JR Motorsports	Chevrolet
2	Tyler Reddick	Richard Childress Racing	Chevrolet
4	Landon Cassill	JD Motorsports	Chevrolet
5	Matt Mills (R)	B. J. McLeod Motorsports	Toyota
07	Ray Black Jr.	SS-Green Light Racing	Chevrolet
7	Justin Allgaier	JR Motorsports	Chevrolet
08	Gray Gaulding (R)	SS-Green Light Racing	Chevrolet
8	Sheldon Creed (i)	JR Motorsports	Chevrolet
9	Noah Gragson (R)	JR Motorsports	Chevrolet
10	A. J. Allmendinger	Kaulig Racing	Chevrolet
11	Justin Haley (R)	Kaulig Racing	Chevrolet
13	Joe Nemechek (i)	MBM Motorsports	Toyota
15	B. J. McLeod	JD Motorsports	Chevrolet
16	Ross Chastain (i)	Kaulig Racing	Chevrolet
18	Riley Herbst (i)	Joe Gibbs Racing	Toyota
19	Brandon Jones	Joe Gibbs Racing	Toyota
20	Christopher Bell	Joe Gibbs Racing	Toyota
21	Joe Graf Jr.	Richard Childress Racing	Chevrolet
22	Austin Cindric	Team Penske	Ford
23	John Hunter Nemechek (R)	GMS Racing	Chevrolet
25	Chris Cockrum	ACG Motorsports	Chevrolet
28	Shane Lee	H2 Motorsports	Toyota
35	Joey Gase	MBM Motorsports	Toyota
36	Josh Williams	DGM Racing	Chevrolet
38	Jeff Green	RSS Racing	Chevrolet
39	Ryan Sieg	RSS Racing	Chevrolet
42	Chad Finchum	MBM Motorsports	Toyota
51	Jeremy Clements	Jeremy Clements Racing	Chevrolet
52	David Starr	Jimmy Means Racing	Chevrolet
61	Austin Hill (i)	Hattori Racing Enterprises	Toyota
66	Timmy Hill	MBM Motorsports	Toyota
74	Mike Harmon	Mike Harmon Racing	Chevrolet
78	Vinnie Miller	B. J. McLeod Motorsports	Toyota
86	Brandon Brown	Brandonbilt Motorsports	Chevrolet
90	Caesar Bacarella	DGM Racing	Chevrolet
93	Scott Lagasse Jr.	RSS Racing	Chevrolet
98	Chase Briscoe (R)	Stewart-Haas Racing with Biagi-DenBeste Racing	Ford
99	Stefan Parsons	B. J. McLeod Motorsports	Toyota

== Practice ==
=== Final practice ===
A. J. Allmendinger was the fastest in the first practice session with a time of 46.177 seconds and a speed of 194.902 mph (313.664 km/h).

Pos	No.	Driver	Team	Manufacturer	Time	Speed
1	10	A. J. Allmendinger	Kaulig Racing	Chevrolet	46.177	194.902
2	25	Chris Cockrum	ACG Motorsports	Chevrolet	46.295	194.405
3	19	Brandon Jones	Joe Gibbs Racing	Toyota	46.360	194.133

== Qualifying ==
Tyler Reddick scored the pole for the race with a time of 47.938 seconds and a speed of 187.743 mph (302.143 km/h).

=== Qualifying results ===
Pos	No	Driver	Team	Manufacturer	Time
1	2	Tyler Reddick	Richard Childress Racing	Chevrolet	47.938
2	10	A. J. Allmendinger	Kaulig Racing	Chevrolet	48.060
3	1	Michael Annett	JR Motorsports	Chevrolet	48.064
4	16	Ross Chastain (i)	Kaulig Racing	Chevrolet	48.065
5	08	Gray Gaulding (R)	SS-Green Light Racing	Chevrolet	48.101
6	21	Joe Graf Jr.	Richard Childress Racing	Chevrolet	48.119
7	11	Justin Haley (R)	Kaulig Racing	Chevrolet	48.140
8	20	Christopher Bell	Joe Gibbs Racing	Toyota	48.157
9	8	Sheldon Creed (i)	JR Motorsports	Chevrolet	48.194
10	98	Chase Briscoe (R)	Stewart-Haas Racing with Biagi-DenBeste Racing	Ford	48.271
11	18	Riley Herbst (i)	Joe Gibbs Racing	Toyota	48.278
12	7	Justin Allgaier	JR Motorsports	Chevrolet	48.309
13	90	Caesar Bacarella	DGM Racing	Chevrolet	48.327
14	39	Ryan Sieg	RSS Racing	Chevrolet	48.334
15	00	Cole Custer	Stewart-Haas Racing with Biagi-DenBeste Racing	Ford	48.353
16	9	Noah Gragson (R)	JR Motorsports	Chevrolet	48.358
17	19	Brandon Jones	Joe Gibbs Racing	Toyota	48.377
18	66	Timmy Hill	MBM Motorsports	Toyota	48.390
19	22	Austin Cindric	Team Penske	Ford	48.553
20	38	Jeff Green	RSS Racing	Chevrolet	48.607
21	23	John Hunter Nemechek (R)	GMS Racing	Chevrolet	48.618
22	25	Chris Cockrum	ACG Motorsports	Chevrolet	48.626
23	93	Scott Lagasse Jr.	RSS Racing	Chevrolet	48.692
24	4	Landon Cassill	JD Motorsports	Chevrolet	48.872
25	01	Stephen Leicht	JD Motorsports	Chevrolet	48.883
26	36	Josh Williams	DGM Racing	Chevrolet	48.890
27	78	Vinnie Miller	B. J. McLeod Motorsports	Toyota	49.031
28	5	Matt Mills (R)	B. J. McLeod Motorsports	Toyota	49.164
29	99	Stefan Parsons	B. J. McLeod Motorsports	Toyota	49.182
30	15	B. J. McLeod	JD Motorsports	Chevrolet	49.213
31	42	Chad Finchum	MBM Motorsports	Toyota	49.300
32	28	Shane Lee	H2 Motorsports	Toyota	49.366
33	86	Brandon Brown	Brandonbilt Motorsports	Chevrolet	49.386
34	52	David Starr	Jimmy Means Racing	Chevrolet	49.424
35	0	Garrett Smithley	JD Motorsports	Chevrolet	49.724
36	07	Ray Black Jr.	SS-Green Light Racing	Chevrolet	49.751
37	51	Jeremy Clements	Jeremy Clements Racing	Chevrolet	49.905
38	13	Joe Nemechek (i)	MBM Motorsports	Toyota	49.706
Did not qualify
39	74	Mike Harmon	Mike Harmon Racing	Chevrolet	49.577
40	35	Joey Gase	MBM Motorsports	Toyota	49.600
41	61	Austin Hill (i)	Hattori Racing Enterprises	Toyota	0.000

== Race ==
=== Summary ===
Tyler Reddick began on pole. The first caution occurred when Caesar Bacarella lost control of his car and spun, causing seven other drivers to be involved. Landon Cassill was the only driver taken out in this caution due to a bent track bar.

As the first stage neared its end, Ross Chastain blocked Reddick and narrowly missed the wall, but Reddick made contact with it. The stack-up from the two drivers resulted in Sheldon Creed and John Hunter Nemechek simultaneously spinning from contact, bringing out the second caution.

Chastain won Stage 1. On the final lap of the first stage, Justin Haley blocked several drivers from making a run, causing them to pass him from underneath, but NASCAR deemed he forced them below the double-yellow line, and sent him to the rear of the field.

Reddick got a flat tire in the middle of Stage 2 and collected Chase Briscoe, ending his day. A. J. Allmendinger blocked Chastain to win Stage 2. The first “Big One” occurred in the middle of the field later on and collected ten drivers. Riley Herbst spun with 21 laps remaining, but no caution was thrown. Another “Big One” 7 laps later took out fifteen drivers, including Michael Annett and Cole Custer, and also brought out a red flag.

On the final restart, Shane Lee and Justin Allgaier both spun out on separate occasions, but no caution was thrown for either instance. The trio of Kaulig Racing drivers proved too fast for any other driver to contend them. Chastain would win the race and was followed by teammates Haley and Allmendinger, Allmendinger would soon be disqualified after failing post race inspection.

=== Stage Results ===
Stage One Laps: 30

Pos	No	Driver	Team	Manufacturer	Points
1	16	Ross Chastain (i)	Kaulig Racing	Chevrolet	0
2	39	Ryan Sieg	RSS Racing	Chevrolet	9
3	18	Riley Herbst (i)	Joe Gibbs Racing	Toyota	0
4	9	Noah Gragson (R)	JR Motorsports	Chevrolet	7
5	66	Timmy Hill	MBM Motorsports	Toyota	6
6	7	Justin Allgaier	JR Motorsports	Chevrolet	5
7	2	Tyler Reddick	Richard Childress Racing	Chevrolet	4
8	20	Christopher Bell	Joe Gibbs Racing	Toyota	3
9	86	Brandon Brown (R)	Brandonbilt Motorsports	Chevrolet	2
10	98	Chase Briscoe (R)	Stewart-Haas Racing with Biagi-DenBeste	Ford	1

Stage Two Laps: 30

Pos	No	Driver	Team	Manufacturer	Points
1	1	Michael Annett	JR Motorsports	Chevrolet	10
2	16	Ross Chastain (i)	Kaulig Racing	Chevrolet	0
3	11	Justin Haley (R)	Kaulig Racing	Chevrolet	8
4	7	Justin Allgaier	JR Motorsports	Chevrolet	7
5	20	Christopher Bell	Joe Gibbs Racing	Toyota	6
6	9	Noah Gragson (R)	JR Motorsports	Chevrolet	5
7	00	Cole Custer	Stewart-Haas Racing with Biagi-DenBeste	Ford	4
8	18	Riley Herbst (i)	Joe Gibbs Racing	Toyota	0
9	22	Austin Cindric	Team Penske	Ford	2
10	39	Ryan Sieg	RSS Racing	Chevrolet	1

=== Final Stage Results ===
Stage Three Laps: 40

Pos	Grid	No	Driver	Team	Manufacturer	Laps	Points
1	4	16	Ross Chastain (i)	Kaulig Racing	Chevrolet	100	0
2	7	11	Justin Haley (R)	Kaulig Racing	Chevrolet	100	42
3	8	20	Christopher Bell	Joe Gibbs Racing	Toyota	100	43
4	19	22	Austin Cindric	Team Penske	Ford	100	35
5	25	01	Stephen Leicht	JD Motorsports	Chevrolet	100	32
6	33	86	Brandon Brown	Brandonbilt Motorsports	Chevrolet	100	33
7	20	38	Jeff Green	RSS Racing	Chevrolet	100	30
8	5	08	Gray Gaulding (R)	SS-Green Light Racing	Chevrolet	100	29
9	37	51	Jeremy Clements	Jeremy Clements Racing	Chevrolet	100	28
10	28	5	Matt Mills (R)	B. J. McLeod Motorsports	Toyota	100	27
11	27	78	Vinnie Miller	B. J. McLeod Motorsports	Toyota	100	26
12	29	99	Stefan Parsons	B. J. McLeod Motorsports	Toyota	100	25
13	36	07	Ray Black Jr.	SS-Green Light Racing	Chevrolet	100	24
14	35	0	Garrett Smithley	JD Motorsports	Chevrolet	100	23
15	16	9	Noah Gragson (R)	JR Motorsports	Chevrolet	99	34
16	1	2	Tyler Reddick	Richard Childress Racing	Chevrolet	99	25
17	12	7	Justin Allgaier	JR Motorsports	Chevrolet	99	32
18	11	18	Riley Herbst (i)	Joe Gibbs Racing	Toyota	98	0
19	22	25	Chris Cockrum	ACG Motorsports	Chevrolet	97	18
20	18	66	Timmy Hill	MBM Motorsports	Toyota	97	23
21	32	28	Shane Lee	H2 Motorsports	Toyota	97	16
22	21	23	John Hunter Nemechek (R)	GMS Racing	Chevrolet	93	15
23	6	21	Joe Graf Jr.	Richard Childress Racing	Chevrolet	92	14
24	14	39	Ryan Sieg	RSS Racing	Chevrolet	89	23
25	3	1	Michael Annett	JR Motorsports	Chevrolet	86	22
26	15	00	Cole Custer	Stewart-Haas Racing with Biagi-DenBeste	Ford	86	15
27	31	42	Chad Finchum	MBM Motorsports	Toyota	86	10
28	26	36	Josh Williams	DGM Motorsports	Chevrolet	86	9
29	13	90	Caesar Bacarella	DGM Motorsports	Chevrolet	86	8
30	17	19	Brandon Jones	Joe Gibbs Racing	Toyota	76	7
31	23	93	Scott Lagasse Jr.	RSS Racing	Chevrolet	73	6
32	34	52	David Starr	Jimmy Means Racing	Chevrolet	72	5
33	30	15	B. J. McLeod	JD Motorsports	Chevrolet	72	4
34	9	8	Sheldon Creed (i)	JR Motorsports	Chevrolet	71	0
35	10	98	Chase Briscoe (R)	Stewart-Haas Racing with Biagi-DenBeste	Ford	44	3
36	38	13	Joe Nemechek (i)	MBM Motorsports	Toyota	39	0
37	24	4	Landon Cassill	JD Motorsports	Chevrolet	12	1
38	2	10	A. J. Allmendinger	Kaulig Racing	Chevrolet	100	1

== After the race ==
A. J. Allmendinger was disqualified from his third-place finish after his car failed post-race inspection. This was the third consecutive week where a driver was disqualified with respect to the 2019 rules. Allmendinger's car failed an engine vacuum test, dialling back the initial 1-2-3 finish for Kaulig Racing to simply a 1-2 finish. Allmendinger was also stripped of his stage points after being relegated to last place.

Previous race: 2019 Camping World 300	NASCAR Xfinity Series; 2019 season	Next race: 2019 Alsco 300 (Kentucky)
