= Chris Cockrum =

American racing driver (born 1986)

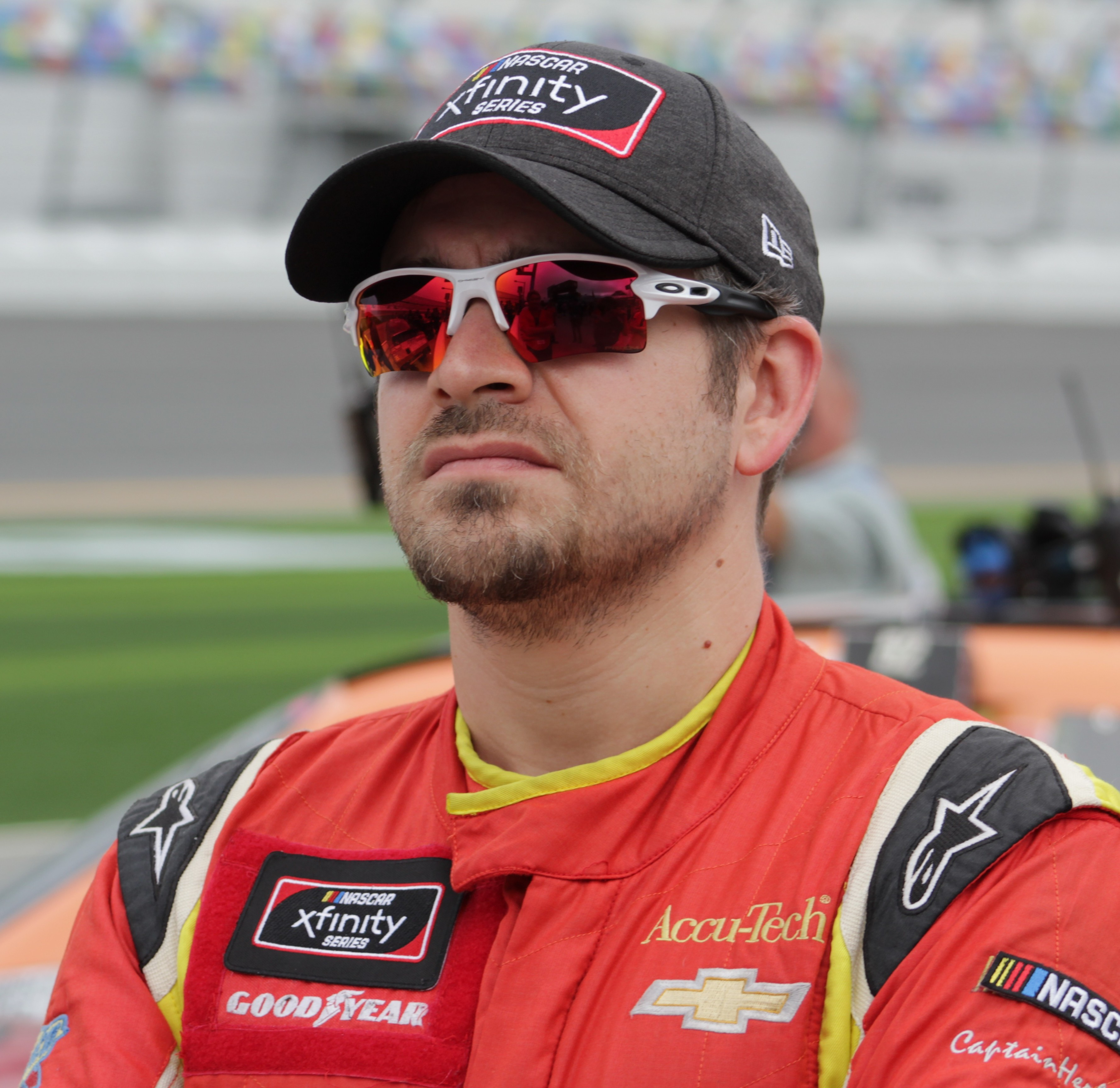
- Cockrum at Daytona International Speedway in 2018
- Born: Christopher Ryan Cockrum; December 24, 1986 (age 39); Conyers, Georgia, U.S.

NASCAR O'Reilly Auto Parts Series career
- 19 races run over 6 years
- 2021 position: 109th
- Best finish: 44th (2016)
- First race: 2014 History 300 (Charlotte)
- Last race: 2020 NASCAR Racing Experience 300 (Daytona)
Wins	Top tens	Poles
0	1	0

NASCAR FedEx Freight Truck Series career
- 10 races run over 4 years
- 2014 position: 85th
- Best finish: 40th (2013)
- First race: 2011 Good Sam Club 200 (Atlanta)
- Last race: 2014 NextEra Energy Resources 250 (Daytona)
Wins	Top tens	Poles
0	0	0
- Statistics up to date as of December 28, 2021.

Christopher Ryan Cockrum (born December 24, 1986) is an American professional stock car racing driver. He last competed part-time in the NASCAR Xfinity Series, driving the No. 25 Chevrolet Camaro for ACG Motorsports.

== Racing career ==
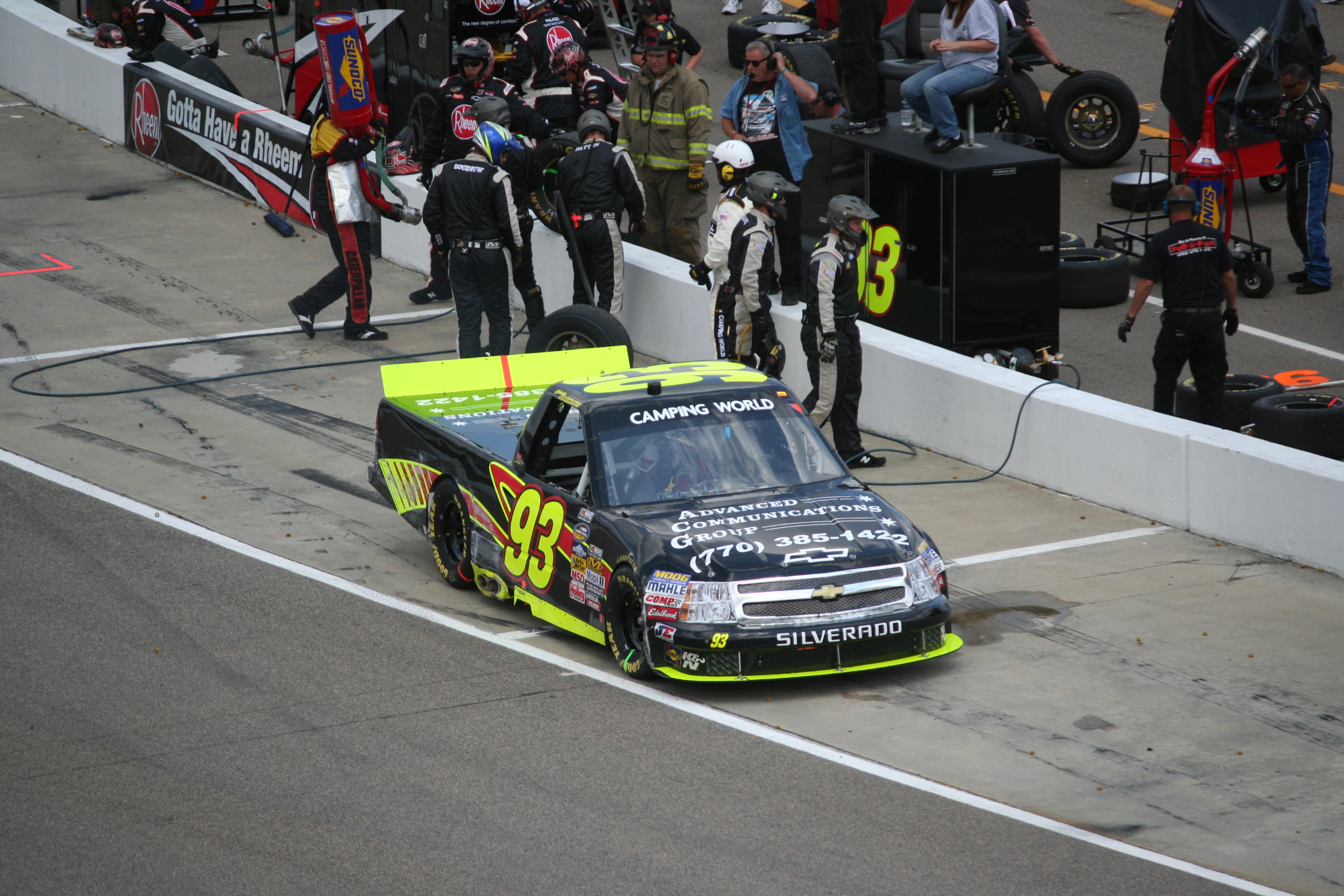
Cockrum's No. 93 RSS truck at Rockingham in 2012 after finishing a pit stop

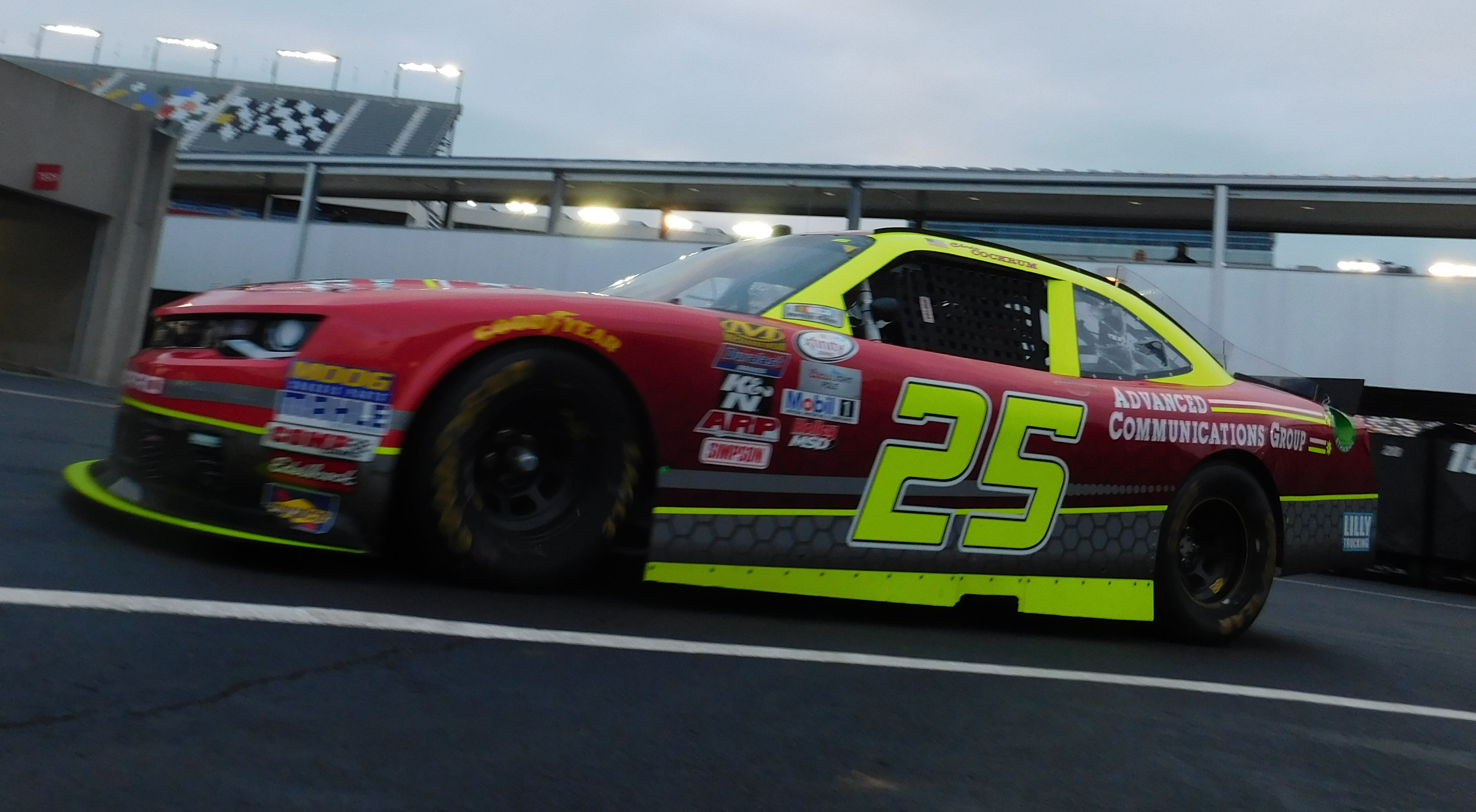
Cockrum's No. 25 in the garage area at Charlotte in October 2016

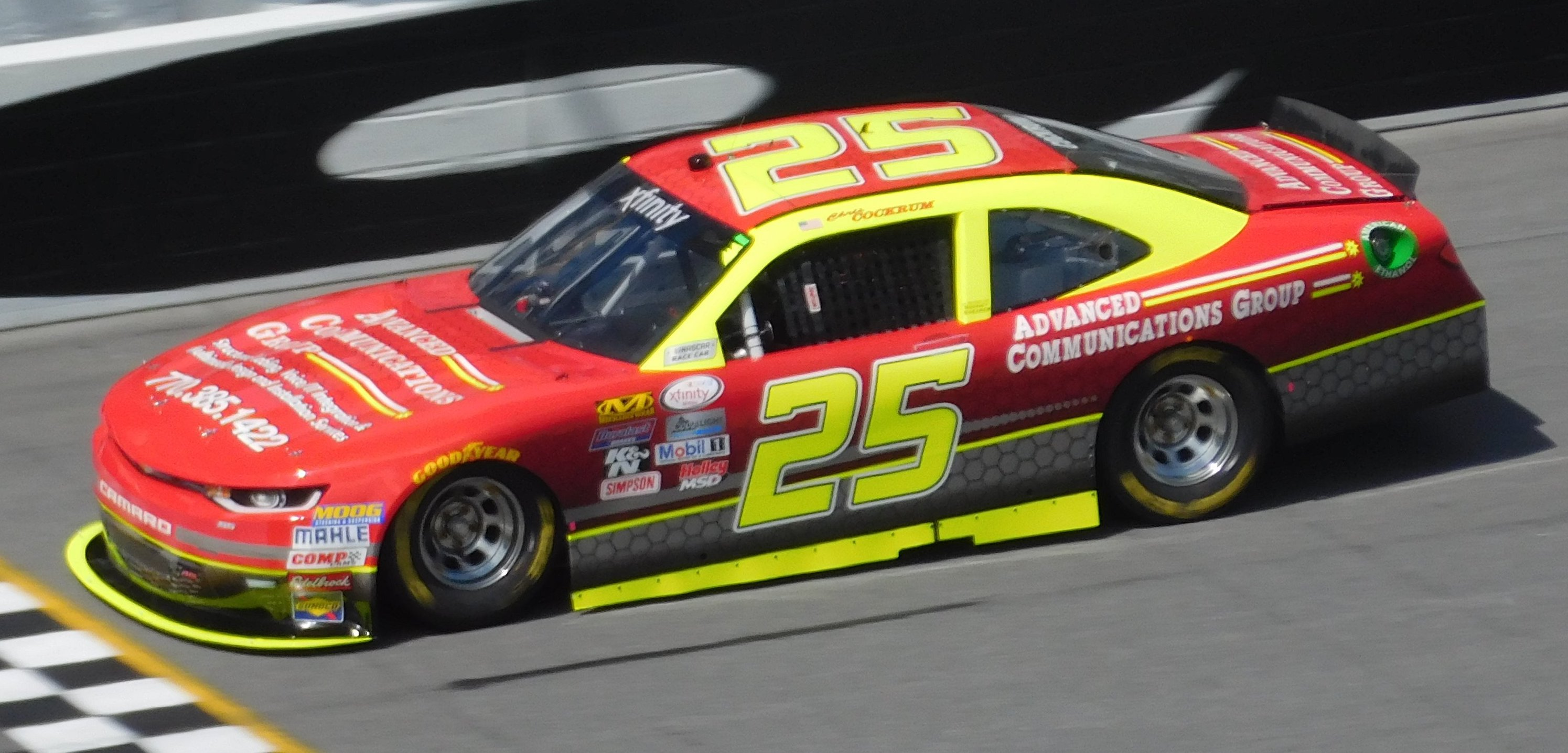
Cockrum's No. 25 at the Daytona season-opener in 2017

Cockrum began his racing career at the age of eight, competing in kart racing events; he transitioned to full-bodied stock cars at the age of 16. He moved to the ARCA Re/Max Series in 2006, making his series debut at Kentucky Speedway in Mark Gibson's No. 56 car. He ran nine races in the series between 2006 and 2010, posting a best finish of twelfth at Daytona International Speedway in 2010 in his family-owned No. 28 car.

Cockrum moved up to the NASCAR Camping World Truck Series in 2011, making his debut in the at Atlanta Motor Speedway for Turn One Racing, finishing 24th. He drove in the first four races of the 2012 season for RSS Racing, posting a best finish of 16th in the season-opening event at Daytona before leaving the team.

The 2013 season saw Cockrum joining SS-Green Light Racing for the Truck Series season opener at Daytona, finishing 15th, his best career run in the series.

In 2014, Cockrum ran the season-opening Truck Series race at Daytona International Speedway; in May, he announced he would attempt to make his debut in the Nationwide Series at Charlotte Motor Speedway.

In 2015, Cockrum joined MBM Motorsports to drive the No. 13 Chevrolet for one race at Daytona, where he finished career best finish 21st. Cockrum also raced at his hometown track Atlanta where he finished 29th, driving the No. 15 Chevrolet for RWR. Cockrum joined a new Xfinity Series team Deese Racing Enterprises, driving the No. 35 Chevrolet to attempt to qualify at Talledega but he failed to. Cockrum formed his team to race at the fall Daytona race but he failed to qualify.

In 2019, Cockrum scored his first Xfinity Series top-ten at Talladega Superspeedway, driving the No. 17 car.

== Motorsports career results ==
=== NASCAR ===
(key) (Bold – Pole position awarded by qualifying time. Italics – Pole position earned by points standings or practice time. * – Most laps led.)

==== Xfinity Series ====
NASCAR Xfinity Series results
Year	Team	No.	Make	1	2	3	4	5	6	7	8	9	10	11	12	13	14	15	16	17	18	19	20	21	22	23	24	25	26	27	28	29	30	31	32	33	NXSC	Pts	Ref
2014	Rick Ware Racing	87	Chevy	DAY	PHO	LVS	BRI	CAL	TEX	DAR	RCH	TAL	IOW	CLT; 35	DOV	MCH	ROA	KEN	DAY	NHA	CHI	IND	IOW	GLN	MOH	BRI											114th	0^{1}	
2014	Rick Ware Racing	87	Ford																								ATL; 29	RCH	CHI	KEN	DOV	KAN	CLT	TEX	PHO	HOM	114th	0^{1}	
2015	MBM Motorsports	13	Chevy	DAY; 21																																	49th	38	
2015	Rick Ware Racing	15	Chevy		ATL; 29	LVS	PHO	CAL	TEX	BRI	RCH																										49th	38	
2015	Deese Racing Enterprises	35	Chevy									TAL; DNQ	IOW	CLT	DOV	MCH	CHI																				49th	38	
2015	Chris Cockrum Racing	37	Chevy															DAY; DNQ	KEN	NHA	IND	IOW	GLN	MOH	BRI	ROA	DAR	RCH	CHI	KEN	DOV	CLT	KAN	TEX	PHO	HOM	49th	38	
2016	Chris Cockrum Racing	25	Chevy	DAY; 28	ATL; 29	LVS	PHO	CAL	TEX	BRI	RCH	TAL; 37	DOV	CLT	POC	MCH; 32	IOW	DAY	KEN	NHA; 29	IND	IOW	GLN	MOH	BRI	ROA	DAR	RCH; QL^{†}	CHI			CLT; 35	KAN	TEX	PHO	HOM	44th	56	
2016	Rick Ware Racing	25	Ford																											KEN; QL^{‡}	DOV						44th	56	
2017	Chris Cockrum Racing	25	Chevy	DAY; 28	ATL; 34	LVS	PHO	CAL	TEX	BRI	RCH	TAL; 33	CLT	DOV	POC	MCH	IOW	DAY; 26	KEN	NHA	IND	IOW	GLN	MOH	BRI	ROA	DAR	RCH	CHI; 30	KEN	DOV	CLT	KAN	TEX	PHO	HOM	53rd	34	
2018	Chris Cockrum Racing	25	Chevy	DAY; DNQ	ATL	LVS	PHO	CAL	TEX	BRI	RCH	TAL	DOV	CLT	POC	MCH	IOW	CHI	DAY	KEN	NHA	IOW	GLN	MOH	BRI	ROA	DAR	IND	LVS	RCH	CLT	DOV	KAN	TEX	PHO	HOM	N/A	0	
2019	ACG Motorsports	17	Chevy	DAY; 31	ATL	LVS	PHO	CAL	TEX	BRI	RCH	TAL; 10	DOV	CLT	POC	MCH	IOW	CHI																			47th	51	
2019	ACG Motorsports	25	Chevy																DAY; 19	KEN	NHA	IOW	GLN	MOH	BRI	ROA	DAR	IND	LVS	RCH	CLT	DOV	KAN	TEX	PHO	HOM	47th	51	
2020	ACG Motorsports	25	Chevy	DAY; 34	LVS	CAL	PHO	DAR	CLT	BRI	ATL	HOM	HOM	TAL	POC	IND	KEN	KEN	TEX	KAN	ROA	DAY	DOV	DOV	DAY	DAR	RCH	RCH	BRI	LVS	TAL	CLT	KAN	TEX	MAR	PHO	70th	3	
2021	ACG Motorsports	25	Chevy	DAY; DNQ	DAY	HOM	LVS	PHO	ATL	MAR	TAL	DAR	DOV	COA	CLT	MOH	TEX	NSH	POC	ROA	ATL	NHA	GLN	IND	MCH	DAY	DAR	RCH	BRI	LVS	TAL	CLT	TEX	KAN	MAR	PHO	109th	-	
^{†} – Qualified but replaced by Austin Theriault · ^{‡} – Qualified for Todd Peck

==== Camping World Truck Series ====
NASCAR Camping World Truck Series results
Year	Team	No.	Make	1	2	3	4	5	6	7	8	9	10	11	12	13	14	15	16	17	18	19	20	21	22	23	24	25	NCWTC	Pts	Ref
2011	Turn One Racing	66	Chevy	DAY	PHO	DAR	MAR	NSH	DOV	CLT	KAN	TEX	KEN	IOW	NSH	IRP	POC	MCH	BRI	ATL; 24	CHI	NHA	KEN	LVS	TAL	MAR	TEX	HOM	68th	20	
2012	RSS Racing	93	Chevy	DAY; 16	MAR; 27	CAR; 29	KAN; 26	CLT	DOV	TEX	KEN	IOW	CHI	POC	MCH	BRI	ATL	IOW	KEN	LVS	TAL	MAR	TEX	PHO	HOM				44th	78	
2013	SS-Green Light Racing	07	Toyota	DAY; 15	MAR	CAR	KAN			TEX; 28	KEN	IOW	ELD	POC	MCH	BRI	MSP	IOW	CHI	LVS	TAL; 34	MAR	TEX	PHO	HOM				40th	77	
2013	SS-Green Light Racing	07	Chevy					CLT; 22	DOV																				40th	77	
2014	Rick Ware Racing	74	Chevy	DAY; 35	MAR	KAN	CHA	DOV	TEX	GTW	KEN	IOW	ELD	POC	MCH	BRI	MSP	CHI	NHA	LVS	TAL	MAR	TEX	PHO	HOM				86th	9	

^{*} Season still in progress
^{1} Ineligible for series points

=== ARCA Racing Series ===
(key) (Bold – Pole position awarded by qualifying time. Italics – Pole position earned by points standings or practice time. * – Most laps led.)

ARCA Racing Series results
Year	Team	No.	Make	1	2	3	4	5	6	7	8	9	10	11	12	13	14	15	16	17	18	19	20	21	22	23	ARSC	Pts	Ref
2006	Mark Gibson Racing	56	Chevy	DAY	NSH; DNQ	SLM	WIN	KEN; 19	TOL	POC	MCH	KAN	KEN; DNQ	BLN	POC	GTW	NSH; DNQ	MCH	ISF	MIL	TOL	DSF	CHI; DNQ	SLM	TAL	IOW	97th	235	
2007	Mark Gibson Racing	13	Chevy	DAY; DNQ	USA																						96th	225	
2007	Mark Gibson Racing	21	Chevy													KEN; DNQ	POC	NSH	ISF	MIL	GTW	DSF	CHI; DNQ	SLM	TAL	TOL	96th	225	
2007	Hagans Racing	9	Chevy			NSH; 26	SLM	KAN; 36	WIN	KEN	TOL	IOW	POC	MCH	BLN												96th	225	
2008	ACG Motorsports	87	Chevy	DAY; DNQ	SLM	IOW	KAN	CAR	KEN	TOL	POC	MCH	CAY														120th	140	
2008	Mark Gibson Racing	21	Chevy											KEN; 37	BLN	POC	NSH; 32	ISF	DSF	CHI	SLM	NJM	TAL	TOL			120th	140	
2009	ACG Motorsports	28	Chevy	DAY; 33	SLM	CAR	TAL	KEN	TOL	POC	MCH	MFD	IOW	KEN; 17	BLN	POC	ISF	CHI	TOL	DSF	NJE	SLM	KAN	CAR			103rd	210	
2010	ACG Motorsports	28	Chevy	DAY; 12	PBE	SLM	TEX	TAL	TOL	POC	MCH	IOW	MFD	POC	BLN	NJE	ISF	CHI; 15	DSF	TOL	SLM	KAN	CAR				66th	325	
