= 2019 MoneyLion 300 =

Race details
- Race 9 of 33 in the 2019 NASCAR Xfinity Series season
- Date: April 27, 2019
- Location: Talladega Superspeedway in Lincoln, Alabama
- Course: Permanent racing facility
- Course length: 2.66 miles (4.28 km)
- Distance: 113 laps, 300.58 mi (483.74 km)

Pole position
Driver	Michael Annett	JR Motorsports
- Time: 50.596

Most laps led
Driver	Tyler Reddick	Richard Childress Racing
- Laps: 34

Winner
No. 2	Tyler Reddick	Richard Childress Racing

Television in the United States
- Network: FS1

Radio in the United States
- Radio: MRN

The 2019 MoneyLion 300 was a NASCAR Xfinity Series race held on April 27, 2019, at Talladega Superspeedway in Lincoln, Alabama. Contested over 113 laps on the 2.66 mile (4.28 km) superspeedway, it was the ninth race of the 2019 NASCAR Xfinity Series season. This was the season's third Dash 4 Cash race.

== Background ==
=== Track ===
Talladega Superspeedway, the track where the race will be held

Talladega Superspeedway, formerly known as Alabama International Motor Speedway, is a motorsports complex located north of Talladega, Alabama. It is located on the former Anniston Air Force Base in the small city of Lincoln. A tri-oval, the track was constructed in 1969 by the International Speedway Corporation, a business controlled by the France family. Talladega is most known for its steep banking. The track currently hosts NASCAR's Monster Energy NASCAR Cup Series, Xfinity Series and Gander Outdoors Truck Series. Talladega is the longest NASCAR oval with a length of 2.66-mile-long (4.28 km) tri-oval like the Daytona International Speedway, which is a 2.5-mile-long (4.0 km).

=== Dash 4 Cash ===
For this race, Cole Custer, Austin Cindric, Justin Allgaier, and Tyler Reddick had qualified for Dash 4 Cash at the previous race. Custer was the defending winner of the award.

== Entry list ==
No.	Driver	Team	Manufacturer
00	Cole Custer	Stewart-Haas Racing with Biagi-DenBeste Racing	Ford
0	Garrett Smithley	JD Motorsports	Chevrolet
01	Stephen Leicht	JD Motorsports	Chevrolet
1	Michael Annett	JR Motorsports	Chevrolet
2	Tyler Reddick	Richard Childress Racing	Chevrolet
4	Landon Cassill	JD Motorsports	Chevrolet
5	Matt Mills (R)	B. J. McLeod Motorsports	Toyota
07	Ray Black Jr.	SS-Green Light Racing	Chevrolet
7	Justin Allgaier	JR Motorsports	Chevrolet
08	Gray Gaulding (R)	SS-Green Light Racing	Chevrolet
8	Brett Moffitt (i)	JR Motorsports	Chevrolet
9	Noah Gragson (R)	JR Motorsports	Chevrolet
10	Ross Chastain	Kaulig Racing	Chevrolet
11	Justin Haley (R)	Kaulig Racing	Chevrolet
13	Chad Finchum	MBM Motorsports	Toyota
15	B. J. McLeod	JD Motorsports	Chevrolet
17	Chris Cockrum	ACG Motorsports	Chevrolet
18	Jeffrey Earnhardt	Joe Gibbs Racing	Toyota
19	Brandon Jones	Joe Gibbs Racing	Toyota
20	Christopher Bell	Joe Gibbs Racing	Toyota
22	Austin Cindric	Team Penske	Ford
23	John Hunter Nemechek (R)	GMS Racing	Chevrolet
35	Joey Gase	MBM Motorsports	Toyota
36	Josh Williams	DGM Racing	Chevrolet
38	Jeff Green	RSS Racing	Chevrolet
39	Ryan Sieg	RSS Racing	Chevrolet
42	Max Tullman	MBM Motorsports	Toyota
51	Jeremy Clements	Jeremy Clements Racing	Chevrolet
52	David Starr	Jimmy Means Racing	Chevrolet
66	Timmy Hill	MBM Motorsports	Toyota
74	Mike Harmon	Mike Harmon Racing	Chevrolet
78	Vinnie Miller	B. J. McLeod Motorsports	Toyota
86	Brandon Brown (R)	Brandonbilt Motorsports	Chevrolet
90	Alex Labbé	DGM Racing	Chevrolet
93	Josh Bilicki	RSS Racing	Chevrolet
98	Chase Briscoe (R)	Stewart-Haas Racing with Biagi-DenBeste Racing	Ford
99	Cody Ware	B. J. McLeod Motorsports	Toyota

== Practice ==
=== First practice ===
Ross Chastain was the fastest in the first practice session with a time of 49.417 seconds and a speed of 193.779 mph (311.857 km/h).

Pos	No.	Driver	Team	Manufacturer	Time	Speed
1	10	Ross Chastain	Kaulig Racing	Chevrolet	49.417	193.779
2	9	Noah Gragson (R)	JR Motorsports	Chevrolet	49.649	192.874
3	98	Chase Briscoe (R)	Stewart-Haas Racing with Biagi-DenBeste Racing	Ford	49.662	192.823

=== Final practice ===
Ryan Sieg was the fastest in the final practice session with a time of 50.984 seconds and a speed of 187.824 mph (302.273 km/h).

Pos	No.	Driver	Team	Manufacturer	Time	Speed
1	39	Ryan Sieg	RSS Racing	Chevrolet	50.984	187.824
2	10	Ross Chastain	Kaulig Racing	Chevrolet	51.179	187.108
3	23	John Hunter Nemechek (R)	GMS Racing	Chevrolet	51.831	184.754

== Qualifying ==
Michael Annett scored the pole for the race with a time of 50.596 seconds and a speed of 189.264 mph (304.591 km/h).

=== Qualifying results ===
Pos	No	Driver	Team	Manufacturer	Time
1	1	Michael Annett	JR Motorsports	Chevrolet	50.596
2	2	Tyler Reddick	Richard Childress Racing	Chevrolet	50.771
3	10	Ross Chastain	Kaulig Racing	Chevrolet	50.797
4	39	Ryan Sieg	RSS Racing	Chevrolet	50.836
5	11	Justin Haley (R)	Kaulig Racing	Chevrolet	50.842
6	8	Brett Moffitt (i)	JR Motorsports	Chevrolet	50.844
7	18	Jeffrey Earnhardt	Joe Gibbs Racing	Toyota	50.921
8	08	Gray Gaulding (R)	SS-Green Light Racing	Chevrolet	50.954
9	98	Chase Briscoe (R)	Stewart-Haas Racing with Biagi-DenBeste Racing	Ford	50.998
10	20	Christopher Bell	Joe Gibbs Racing	Toyota	51.043
11	7	Justin Allgaier	JR Motorsports	Chevrolet	51.074
12	00	Cole Custer	Stewart-Haas Racing with Biagi-DenBeste Racing	Ford	51.270
13	19	Brandon Jones	Joe Gibbs Racing	Toyota	51.247
14	9	Noah Gragson (R)	JR Motorsports	Chevrolet	51.261
15	23	John Hunter Nemechek (R)	GMS Racing	Chevrolet	51.445
16	36	Josh Williams	DGM Racing	Chevrolet	51.573
17	22	Austin Cindric	Team Penske	Ford	51.601
18	17	Chris Cockrum	ACG Motorsports	Chevrolet	51.743
19	66	Timmy Hill	MBM Motorsports	Toyota	51.814
20	01	Stephen Leicht	JD Motorsports	Chevrolet	51.869
21	38	Jeff Green	RSS Racing	Chevrolet	51.929
22	4	Landon Cassill	JD Motorsports	Chevrolet	51.945
23	93	Josh Bilicki	RSS Racing	Chevrolet	51.966
24	90	Alex Labbé	DGM Racing	Chevrolet	52.010
25	15	B. J. McLeod	JD Motorsports	Chevrolet	52.189
26	5	Matt Mills (R)	B. J. McLeod Motorsports	Toyota	52.287
27	35	Joey Gase	MBM Motorsports	Toyota	52.399
28	52	David Starr	Jimmy Means Racing	Chevrolet	52.467
29	78	Vinnie Miller	B. J. McLeod Motorsports	Toyota	52.489
30	51	Jeremy Clements	Jeremy Clements Racing	Chevrolet	52.545
31	74	Mike Harmon	Mike Harmon Racing	Chevrolet	52.571
32	86	Brandon Brown (R)	Brandonbilt Motorsports	Chevrolet	52.716
33	0	Garrett Smithley	JD Motorsports	Chevrolet	52.734
34	99	Cody Ware	B. J. McLeod Motorsports	Toyota	52.744
35	42	Max Tullman	MBM Motorsports	Toyota	52.826
36	07	Ray Black Jr.	SS-Green Light Racing	Chevrolet	52.837
37	13	Chad Finchum	MBM Motorsports	Toyota	52.837

. – Eligible for Dash 4 Cash prize money

== Race ==
=== Summary ===
Michael Annett began on pole. Brandon Jones spun out early during Stage 1, which was won by Tyler Reddick after he overtook Annett before the first lap. Noah Gragson would win Stage 2. Gragson brought out the fifth caution of the race when he spun out trying to overtake Reddick on lap 86.

Annett got loose and crashed into Justin Allgaier and Cole Custer on lap 96, though Allgaier's car was able to get repaired and return to the race. Annett and Custer were eliminated in the crash, which also collected Stephen Leicht, Austin Cindric, Ryan Sieg, and Cody Ware. Nearing the end of the race on lap 110, Jeffrey Earnhardt got loose and caused a Big One that took out Allgaier, Jeremy Clements, and Timmy Hill. David Starr and Alex Labbé also were involved but stayed in the race. The race was won by Reddick despite the minor damage to his car. He was able to hold off Gray Gaulding (who had his highest finish in the series) and the rest of the field after a late restart, also winning the Dash 4 Cash prize money.

=== Stage Results ===
Stage One Laps: 25

Pos	No	Driver	Team	Manufacturer	Points
1	2	Tyler Reddick	Richard Childress Racing	Chevrolet	10
2	10	Ross Chastain	Kaulig Racing	Chevrolet	9
3	22	Austin Cindric	Team Penske	Ford	8
4	39	Ryan Sieg	RSS Racing	Chevrolet	7
5	08	Gray Gaulding	SS-Green Light Racing	Chevrolet	6
6	7	Justin Allgaier	JR Motorsports	Chevrolet	5
7	9	Noah Gragson (R)	JR Motorsports	Chevrolet	4
8	20	Christopher Bell	Joe Gibbs Racing	Toyota	3
9	23	John Hunter Nemechek	GMS Racing	Chevrolet	2
10	11	Justin Haley (R)	Kaulig Racing	Chevrolet	1

Stage Two Laps: 25

Pos	No	Driver	Team	Manufacturer	Points
1	9	Noah Gragson (R)	JR Motorsports	Chevrolet	10
2	7	Justin Allgaier	JR Motorsports	Chevrolet	9
3	39	Ryan Sieg	RSS Racing	Chevrolet	8
4	98	Chase Briscoe (R)	Stewart-Haas Racing with Biagi-DenBeste	Ford	7
5	10	Ross Chastain	Kaulig Racing	Chevrolet	6
6	20	Christopher Bell	Joe Gibbs Racing	Toyota	5
7	19	Brandon Jones	Joe Gibbs Racing	Toyota	4
8	11	Justin Haley (R)	Kaulig Racing	Chevrolet	3
9	1	Michael Annett	JR Motorsports	Chevrolet	2
10	2	Tyler Reddick	Richard Childress Racing	Chevrolet	1

=== Final Stage Results ===
Stage Three Laps: 83

Pos	Grid	No	Driver	Team	Manufacturer	Laps	Points
1	2	2	Tyler Reddick	Richard Childress Racing	Chevrolet	113	51
2	8	08	Gray Gaulding	SS-Green Light Racing	Chevrolet	113	41
3	10	20	Christopher Bell	Joe Gibbs Racing	Toyota	113	43
4	9	98	Chase Briscoe (R)	Stewart-Haas Racing with Biagi-DenBeste	Ford	113	40
5	17	22	Austin Cindric	Team Penske	Ford	113	40
6	15	23	John Hunter Nemechek (R)	GMS Racing	Chevrolet	113	32
7	5	11	Justin Haley (R)	Kaulig Racing	Chevrolet	113	36
8	16	36	Josh Williams	DGM Racing	Chevrolet	113	29
9	22	4	Landon Cassill	JD Motorsports	Chevrolet	113	0
10	18	17	Chris Cockrum	ACG Motorsports	Chevrolet	113	27
11	14	9	Noah Gragson (R)	JR Motorsports	Chevrolet	113	38
12	33	0	Garrett Smithley	JD Motorsports	Chevrolet	113	25
13	6	8	Brett Moffitt (i)	JR Motorsports	Chevrolet	113	0
14	28	52	David Starr	Jimmy Means Racing	Chevrolet	113	23
15	32	86	Brandon Brown (R)	Brandonbilt Motorsports	Chevrolet	113	22
16	4	39	Ryan Sieg	RSS Racing	Chevrolet	113	36
17	26	5	Matt Mills (R)	B. J. McLeod Motorsports	Toyota	113	20
18	13	19	Brandon Jones	Joe Gibbs Racing	Toyota	113	23
19	29	78	Vinnie Miller	B. J. McLeod Motorsports	Toyota	113	18
20	35	42	Max Tullman	MBM Motorsports	Toyota	113	17
21	34	99	Cody Ware	B. J. McLeod Motorsports	Toyota	113	0
22	25	15	B. J. McLeod	JD Motorsports	Chevrolet	113	15
23	31	74	Mike Harmon	Mike Harmon Racing	Chevrolet	111	14
24	20	01	Stephen Leicht	JD Motorsports	Chevrolet	111	13
25	24	90	Alex Labbé	DGM Racing	Chevrolet	111	12
26	7	18	Jeffrey Earnhardt	Joe Gibbs Racing	Toyota	110	11
27	30	51	Jeremy Clements	Jeremy Clements Racing	Chevrolet	108	10
28	11	7	Justin Allgaier	JR Motorsports	Chevrolet	108	23
29	19	66	Timmy Hill	MBM Motorsports	Toyota	108	8
30	3	10	Ross Chastain	Kaulig Racing	Chevrolet	105	22
31	1	1	Michael Annett	JR Motorsports	Chevrolet	95	8
32	12	00	Cole Custer	Stewart-Haas Racing with Biagi-DenBeste	Ford	94	5
33	23	93	Josh Bilicki	RSS Racing	Chevrolet	86	4
34	36	07	Ray Black Jr.	SS-Green Light Racing	Chevrolet	65	3
35	21	38	Jeff Green	RSS Racing	Chevrolet	52	2
36	37	13	Chad Finchum	MBM Motorsports	Toyota	36	1
37	27	35	Joey Gase	MBM Motorsports	Toyota	35	1

. – Won the Dash 4 Cash prize money and subsequently qualified for the Dash 4 Cash prize money in the next race.

. – Qualified for Dash 4 Cash prize money in the next race.

Previous race: 2019 ToyotaCare 250	NASCAR Xfinity Series; 2019 season	Next race: 2019 Allied Steel Buildings 200
