= 2015 Alert Today Florida 300 =

Race details
- Map of Speedway
- Date: February 21, 2015
- Official name: 2015 Alert Today Florida 300
- Location: Daytona International Speedway in Daytona Beach, Florida
- Course: Tri-oval
- Course length: 2.5 miles (4.023 km)
- Distance: 120 laps, 300 mi (400 km)
- Weather: Cloudy/Sunny
- Average speed: 148.781 mph (239.440 km/h)

Pole position
Driver	Austin Dillon	Richard Childress Racing
- Time: 47.306

Most laps led
Driver	Kyle Busch	Joe Gibbs Racing
- Laps: 27

Winner
No. 16	Ryan Reed	Roush Fenway Racing

Television in the United States
- Network: Fox Sports 1
- Announcers: Adam Alexander, Kevin Harvick, Michael Waltrip.

The 2015 Alert Today Florida 300 was a NASCAR Xfinity Series race held on February 21, 2015, at Daytona International Speedway Daytona Beach, Florida. The race was the first of the 2015 NASCAR Xfinity Series. It was also the 34th iteration of the event. It also had a couple of firsts. It was the first ever race with the title sponsor Xfinity to sponsor the 2nd of the top 3 series of NASCAR with Xfinity replacing Nationwide. It was also the first race since 2006 that Fox would broadcast the lower series of NASCAR. Austin Dillon won the pole while Kyle Busch led the most laps but the race would feature a surprise winner as Ryan Reed won his first ever NASCAR Xfinity Series race of his career in his 40th Xfinity Series start. But the race was most remembered for a crash that left Kyle Busch with a broken leg and foot.

== Background ==
Daytona International Speedway is a race track in Daytona Beach, Florida, United States. Since opening in 1959, it has been the home of the Daytona 500, the most prestigious race in NASCAR as well as its season opening event. In addition to NASCAR, the track also hosts races for ARCA, AMA Superbike, IMSA, SCCA, and Motocross. The track features multiple layouts including the primary 2.500 mi (4.023 km) high-speed tri-oval, a 3.560 mi (5.729 km) sports car course, a 2.950 mi (4.748 km) motorcycle course, and a 1,320 ft (402.3 m) karting and motorcycle flat-track. The track's 180-acre (72.8 ha) infield includes the 29-acre (11.7 ha) Lake Lloyd, which has hosted powerboat racing. The speedway is operated by NASCAR pursuant to a lease with the City of Daytona Beach on the property that runs until 2054. Dale Earnhardt is Daytona International Speedway's all-time winningest driver, with a total of 34 career victories (12- Daytona 500 Qualifying Races) (7- NASCAR Xfinity Series Races) (6- Busch Clash Races) (6- IROC Races) (2- Pepsi 400 July Races) (1- The 1998 Daytona 500).

=== Entry list ===
- (R) denotes rookie driver
- (i) denotes driver who is ineligible for series driver points

#	Driver	Team	Make
0	Harrison Rhodes (R)	JD Motorsports	Chevrolet
01	Landon Cassill	JD Motorsports	Chevrolet
1	Elliott Sadler	Roush Fenway Racing	Ford
2	Brian Scott	Richard Childress Racing	Chevrolet
3	Ty Dillon	Richard Childress Racing	Chevrolet
4	Ross Chastain (R)	JD Motorsports	Chevrolet
6	Bubba Wallace (R)	Roush Fenway Racing	Ford
7	Regan Smith	JR Motorsports	Chevrolet
8	Blake Koch	TriStar Motorsports	Toyota
9	Chase Elliott	JR Motorsports	Chevrolet
10	Jeff Green	TriStar Motorsports	Toyota
13	Chris Cockrum	MBM Motorsports	Chevrolet
14	Cale Conley (R)	TriStar Motorsports	Toyota
15	Carlos Contreras	Rick Ware Racing	Chevrolet
16	Ryan Reed	Roush Fenway Racing	Ford
17	Tanner Berryhill	Vision Racing	Toyota
18	Daniel Suárez (R)	Joe Gibbs Racing	Toyota
19	Scott Lagasse Jr.	TriStar Motorsports	Toyota
20	Erik Jones (i)	Joe Gibbs Racing	Toyota
22	Brad Keselowski (i)	Team Penske	Ford
24	Eric McClure	JGL Racing	Toyota
25	John Wes Townley (i)	Athenian Motorsports	Chevrolet
26	Mike Wallace (i)	JGL Racing	Toyota
28	J. J. Yeley	JGL Racing	Toyota
29	Justin Marks	RAB Racing	Toyota
33	Austin Dillon (i)	Richard Childress Racing	Chevrolet
39	Ryan Sieg	RSS Racing	Chevrolet
40	Derek White	MBM Motorsports	Dodge
42	Kyle Larson (i)	HScott Motorsports with Chip Ganassi	Chevrolet
43	Dakoda Armstrong	Richard Petty Motorsports	Ford
44	David Starr	TriStar Motorsports	Toyota
51	Jeremy Clements	Jeremy Clements Racing	Chevrolet
52	Joey Gase	Jimmy Means Racing	Chevrolet
54	Kyle Busch (i)	Joe Gibbs Racing	Toyota
55	Jeffery Earnhardt	Viva Motorsports	Chevrolet
60	Chris Buescher	Roush Fenway Racing	Ford
62	Brendan Gaughan	Richard Childress Racing	Chevrolet
70	Derrike Cope	Derrike Cope Racing	Chevrolet
74	Mike Harmon	Mike Harmon Racing	Dodge
84	Chad Boat (i)	Billy Boat Motorsports	Chevrolet
85	Bobby Gerhart	Bobby Gerhart Racing	Chevrolet
87	Joe Nemechek (i)	NEMCO Motorsports	Chevrolet
88	Dale Earnhardt Jr. (i)	JR Motorsports	Chevrolet
89	Morgan Shepherd*	Shepherd Racing Ventures	Chevrolet
90	Mario Gosselin	King Autosport	Chevrolet
92	Dexter Bean	King Autosport	Chevrolet
97	Josh Reaume (R)	Obaika Racing	Chevrolet
98	Aric Almirola (i)	Biagi-DenBeste Racing	Ford
Official Entry List

== Qualifying ==
Austin Dillon won the pole for the race.

Pos	No.	Driver	Team	Manufacturer	R1	R2	R3
1	33	Austin Dillon (i)	Richard Childress Racing	Chevrolet	48.358	48.048	47.306
2	29	Justin Marks	RAB Racing	Toyota	47.843	47.663	47.329
3	84	Chad Boat (i)	Billy Boat Motorsports	Chevrolet	48.291	48.041	47.332
4	62	Brendan Gaughan	Richard Childress Racing	Chevrolet	47.993	48.032	47.510
5	98	Aric Almirola (i)	Biagi-DenBeste Racing	Ford	48.288	48.033	47.531
6	20	Erik Jones (i)	Joe Gibbs Racing	Toyota	47.553	47.659	47.534
7	43	Dakoda Armstrong	Richard Petty Motorsports	Ford	48.275	48.009	47.562
8	16	Ryan Reed	Roush Fenway Racing	Ford	47.956	47.967	47.572
9	28	J. J. Yeley	JGL Racing	Toyota	47.599	47.640	47.577
10	60	Chris Buescher	Roush Fenway Racing	Ford	48.127	47.908	47.589
11	1	Elliott Sadler	Roush Fenway Racing	Ford	47.664	47.979	49.277
12	7	Regan Smith	JR Motorsports	Chevrolet	47.568	47.990	49.306
13	55	Jeffery Earnhardt	Viva Motorsports	Chevrolet	48.333	48.119	—
14	22	Brad Keselowski (i)	Team Penske	Ford	48.277	48.237	—
15	2	Brian Scott	Richard Childress Racing	Chevrolet	48.299	48.391	—
16	39	Ryan Sieg	RSS Racing	Chevrolet	48.353	48.433	—
17	14	Cale Conley (R)	TriStar Motorsports	Toyota	48.290	48.607	—
18	44	David Starr***	TriStar Motorsports	Toyota	48.239	48.907	—
19	74	Mike Harmon	Mike Harmon Racing	Dodge	48.388	50.125	—
20	13	Chris Cockrum	MBM Motorsports	Chevrolet	48.404	51.629	—
21	4	Ross Chastain (R)	JD Motorsports	Chevrolet	48.156	—	—
22	10	Scott Lagasse Jr.*** ****	TriStar Motorsports	Toyota	48.248	—	—
23	51	Jeremy Clements	Jeremy Clements Racing	Chevrolet	48.272	—	—
24	97	Josh Reaume (R)	Obaika Racing	Chevrolet	48.361	—	—
25	24	Eric McClure	JGL Racing	Toyota	48.423	—	—
26	52	Joey Gase	Jimmy Means Racing	Chevrolet	48.438	—	—
27	42	Kyle Larson (i)	HScott Motorsports with Chip Ganassi	Chevrolet	48.487	—	—
28	6	Bubba Wallace (R)	Roush Fenway Racing	Ford	48.571	—	—
29	25	John Wes Townley (i)	Athenian Motorsports	Chevrolet	48.599	—	—
30	92	Dexter Bean	King Autosport	Chevrolet	48.634	—	—
31	26	Mike Wallace (i)	JGL Racing	Toyota	48.652	—	—
32	54	Kyle Busch (i)	Joe Gibbs Racing	Toyota	48.653	—	—
33	40	Derek White	MBM Motorsports	Dodge	48.674	—	—
34	3	Ty Dillon*	Richard Childress Racing	Chevrolet	48.755	—	—
35	9	Chase Elliott*	JR Motorsports	Chevrolet	48.838	—	—
36	18	Daniel Suárez (R)* ***	Joe Gibbs Racing	Toyota	48.841	—	—
37	90	Mario Gosselin*	King Autosport	Chevrolet	49.053	—	—
38	8	Blake Koch* ***	TriStar Motorsports	Toyota	51.093	—	—
39	01	Landon Cassill* ***	JD Motorsports	Chevrolet	54.757	—	—
40	88	Dale Earnhardt Jr. (i)**	JR Motorsports	Chevrolet	50.130	—	—
Failed to Qualify, withdrew, or driver changes
41	87	Joe Nemechek (i)	NEMCO Motorsports	Chevrolet	48.796	—	—
42	19	Scott Lagasse Jr.	TriStar Motorsports	Toyota	48.833	—	—
43	85	Bobby Gerhart	Bobby Gerhart Racing	Chevrolet	48.884	—	—
44	17	Tanner Berryhill	Vision Racing	Toyota	50.944	—	—
45	0	Harrison Rhodes (R)	JD Motorsports	Chevrolet	50.954	—	—
46	70	Derrike Cope	Derrike Cope Racing	Chevrolet	52.422	—	—
47	15	Carlos Contreras	Rick Ware Racing	Chevrolet	54.532	—	—
DC	10	Jeff Green	TriStar Motorsports	Toyota	—	—	—
WD	89	Morgan Shepherd	Shepherd Racing Ventures	Chevrolet	—	—	—
Official Starting Lineup

* – Made the field via owners points

** – Made the field via past champion.

*** – Landon Cassill, Blake Koch, Scott Lagasse Jr., Daniel Suárez, and David Starr had to start at the rear of the field. Cassill, Koch, and Suárez had back up cars, Lagasse Jr. had a drivers change, and Starr had unapproved adjustments.

**** – Jeff Green qualified to car before they switched to Scott Lagasse Jr. for the race.

== Race ==
Pole sitter Austin Dillon led the first lap of the race. On lap 2, Ryan Reed attempted to pass Dillon for the lead but Chris Buescher made a three wide pass for the lead and took the lead. On lap 8, Ty Dillon race side by side for the lead with Buescher and led lap 8 and 9 before he got in front of Buescher. On lap 13, Bubba Wallace took the lead. Ty took it back on the next lap. Wallace led lap 15 as he and Dillon raced side by side for the lead. Wallace led lap 15 and 16 before Ty took it back on lap 17. Wallace took it back on lap 19. Ty took it back on lap 22. Wallace would lead on lap 24. But Ty would take it back on lap 27. Wallace led lap 28 before Ty took back full advantage on lap 29. Wallace led lap 30 and 31 before Ty took it back on lap 32. On lap 35, Bubba Wallace took the lead. Soon, green flag pitstops began. Ty Dillon took the lead from Bubba Wallace on lap 41 after they both made their pitstops. On lap 42, Kyle Busch stormed his way from 5th to the lead.

=== Final laps ===
On lap 69, Regan Smith took the lead. Soon green flag pitstops started up again. With 42 to go, Regan Smith pitted giving Kyle Larson the lead. With 41 to go, the first caution flew after a tire got away from Chris Cockrum's pit stall and sat in the infield grass near the racetrack. Regan Smith got his lead back and led the field to the restart with 35 laps to go. With 33 laps to go, Ryan Reed got side by side with Smith for the lead and led the laps before he got in front with 30 to go. With 28 laps to go, the second caution flew for the first big one out of turn 4 that collected 12 cars. It started when the lapped car of rookie Daniel Suárez was getting pushed by Kyle Larson when Larson got Suárez loose and Suárez spun down and clipped Regan Smith sending Smith into a roll before Smith landed on all fours while other cars crashed with them. The cars involved were Ryan Sieg, Justin Marks, Brendan Gaughan, Daniel Suárez, Regan Smith, Chad Boat, John Wes Townley, Kyle Larson, Chase Elliott, Austin Dillon, Scott Lagasse Jr., and David Starr. A red flag occurred for the incident. But while the cars were coming to a stop, Mike Wallace wasn't paying attention and ran into the rear of Austin Dillon which lifted Dillon's rear wheels off the ground and gave both cars damage. The red flag was soon lifted and the cars got back going again under caution. Ryan Reed led the field to the restart with 21 laps to go. With 20 to go, Chris Buescher took the lead from his teammate. With 18 to go, the third caution flew for debris that came off of Chase Elliott's car. The race restarted with 14 to go. On the restart, Brad Keselowski took the lead from Chris Buescher. Ty Dillon attempted to take the lead but failed to do so. With 9 laps to go, the fourth and final caution flew for the second and final big one of the race that collected 10 cars and involved a scary crash. Coming out of the tri-oval, Erik Jones got turned by Kyle Busch. Jones overcorrected his car back across the field taking out more cars. Busch went high to avoid Jones but lost control of his car and Busch spun down the racetrack. His car slid across the infield grass before it pounded the inside concrete wall head on at about 90 mph. Busch climbed out of his car but immediately laid down in the infield grass and appeared to be hurt. He was carried on a stretcher and was taken to Halifax Medical Center for further evaluation. Busch had a massive compound fracture in the lower right leg, a small fracture in the left foot, and a sprained left finger. Busch would end up missing the first 11 races of the Sprint Cup Series season due to his injury. The cars involved were Kyle Busch, Chase Elliott, J. J. Yeley, Brendan Gaughan, Erik Jones, Brian Scott, Elliott Sadler, Bubba Wallace, Jeffery Earnhardt, and Cale Conley. The race was once again red flagged for the accident. The red flag lifted and the race restarted with 5 laps to go. Keselowski held onto his lead. Kyle Larson took the lead on the restart but was immeadeatly split in between Keselowski and Chris Buescher and Keselowski got the lead back and was racing with Buescher. Larson eventually got side by side with Keselowski again but could not make the pass. On the last lap out of the tri-oval, Larson got loose after contact with Aric Almirola and Larson spun down and collected Ross Chastain. No caution was thrown. In turn 3, Ryan Reed slingshotted Keselowski and Reed took the lead with his teammate Chris Buescher behind him. Reed held off the pack in the last two turns and Reed took home his first career Xfinity Series win in his 40th start with his teammate Buescher finishing 2nd giving owner Jack Roush a one-two finish. Ty Dillon, Austin Dillon, and Brad Keselowski rounded out the top 5 while David Starr, Aric Almirola, Kyle Larson, Ross Chastain, and Dale Earnhardt Jr. rounded out the top 10.

== Race results ==
Pos	Car	Driver	Team	Manufacturer	Laps Run	Laps Led	Status	Points
1	16	Ryan Reed	Roush Fenway Racing	Ford	120	14	running	47
2	60	Chris Buescher	Roush Fenway Racing	Ford	120	12	running	43
3	3	Ty Dillon	Richard Childress Racing	Chevrolet	120	16	running	42
4	33	Austin Dillon (i)	Richard Childress Racing	Chevrolet	120	1	running	0
5	22	Brad Keselowski (i)	Team Penske	Ford	120	13	running	0
6	44	David Starr	TriStar Motorsports	Toyota	120	0	running	38
7	98	Aric Almirola (i)	Biagi-DenBeste Racing	Ford	120	0	running	0
8	42	Kyle Larson (i)	HScott Motorsports with Chip Ganassi	Chevrolet	120	4	running	0
9	4	Ross Chastain (R)	JD Motorsports	Chevrolet	120	0	running	35
10	88	Dale Earnhardt Jr. (i)	JR Motorsports	Chevrolet	119	0	running	0
11	43	Dakoda Armstrong	Richard Petty Motorsports	Ford	119	0	running	33
12	6	Bubba Wallace (R)	Roush Fenway Racing	Ford	119	18	running	33
13	26	Mike Wallace (i)	JGL Racing	Toyota	119	0	running	0
14	51	Jeremy Clements	Jeremy Clements Racing	Chevrolet	118	0	running	30
15	90	Mario Gosselin	King Autosport	Chevrolet	118	0	running	29
16	55	Jeffery Earnhardt	Viva Motorsports	Chevrolet	118	0	running	28
17	24	Eric McClure	JGL Racing	Toyota	116	0	running	27
18	20	Erik Jones (i)	Joe Gibbs Racing	Toyota	116	0	running	0
19	1	Elliott Sadler	Roush Fenway Racing	Ford	116	0	running	25
20	8	Blake Koch	TriStar Motorsports	Toyota	115	0	running	24
21	13	Chris Cockrum	MBM Motorsports	Chevrolet	115	0	running	23
22	40	Derek White	MBM Motorsports	Dodge	115	0	running	22
23	97	Josh Reaume (R)	Obaika Racing	Chevrolet	115	0	running	21
24	74	Mike Harmon	Mike Harmon Racing	Dodge	114	0	running	20
25	2	Brian Scott	Richard Childress Racing	Chevrolet	112	0	crash	19
26	54	Kyle Busch (i)	Joe Gibbs Racing	Toyota	111	27	crash	0
27	28	J. J. Yeley	JGL Racing	Toyota	111	0	crash	17
28	9	Chase Elliott	JR Motorsports	Chevrolet	111	0	crash	16
29	62	Brendan Gaughan	Richard Childress Racing	Chevrolet	110	0	crash	15
30	14	Cale Conley (R)	TriStar Motorsports	Toyota	110	0	crash	14
31	01	Landon Cassill	JD Motorsports	Chevrolet	108	0	running	13
32	52	Joey Gase	Jimmy Means Racing	Chevrolet	107	0	running	12
33	25	John Wes Townley (i)	Athenian Motorsports	Chevrolet	106	0	running	0
34	29	Justin Marks	RAB Racing	Toyota	93	0	crash	10
35	7	Regan Smith	JR Motorsports	Chevrolet	93	15	crash	10
36	84	Chad Boat (i)	Billy Boat Motorsports	Chevrolet	92	0	crash	0
37	10	Scott Lagasse Jr.	TriStar Motorsports	Toyota	92	0	crash	7
38	39	Ryan Sieg	RSS Racing	Chevrolet	92	0	crash	6
39	18	Daniel Suárez (R)	Joe Gibbs Racing	Toyota	91	0	crash	5
40	92	Dexter Bean	King Autosport	Chevrolet	5	0	fuel pump	4
Official Race results

Previous race: 2014 Ford EcoBoost 400	NASCAR Xfinity Series; 2015 season	Next race: 2015 Hisense 250
