= 2020 Drydene 200 =

2020 Drydene 200 may refer to two races held at the Dover International Speedway:

- 2020 Drydene 200 (Saturday), the Xfinity Series race held on Saturday, August 22, 2020.
- 2020 Drydene 200 (Sunday), the Xfinity Series race held on Sunday, August 23, 2020.
