= Caesar Bacarella =

American racing driver (born 1975)

- Born: Caesar Peter Bacarella; December 18, 1975 (age 50); Parkland, Florida, U.S.

NASCAR O'Reilly Auto Parts Series career
- 38 races run over 10 years
- Car no., team: No. 4 (Alpha Prime Racing)
- 2026 position: 62nd
- Best finish: 42nd (2025)
- First race: 2017 Ticket Galaxy 200 (Phoenix)
- Last race: 2026 TPG 250 (Talladega)
Wins	Top tens	Poles
0	4	0

ARCA Menards Series career
- 2 races run over 1 year
- Best finish: 92nd (2017)
- First race: 2017 Lucas Oil 200 (Daytona)
- Last race: 2017 General Tire 200 (Talladega)
Wins	Top tens	Poles
0	0	0
- Statistics up to date as of November 7, 2026.

Caesar Peter Bacarella (born December 18, 1975) is an American professional stock car racing driver and team owner. He competes part-time in the NASCAR O'Reilly Auto Parts Series, driving the No. 4 Ford Mustang Dark Horse, for his own team, Alpha Prime Racing. Bacarella has also driven in the ARCA Menards Series and Pirelli World Challenge.

== Racing career ==
=== Pirelli World Challenge ===
For the 2018 season, Bacarella joined Squadra Corse Garage Italia Americas for the series Sprint-X races.

=== ARCA Racing Series ===
Bacarella drove in two races in the 2017 ARCA Racing Series with Finney Racing, driving the No. 80 car. Bacarella finished 33rd after being involved in a wreck in his first start, at Daytona. His second start, also with Finney Racing and his No. 80 car, came at Talladega. There, he yielded a DNF once again but finished 25th.

=== NASCAR O'Reilly Auto Parts Series ===
Teaming up with B. J. McLeod Motorsports, Bacarella made his debut in the 2017 Ticket Galaxy 200 at Phoenix. After qualifying on owner points in 37th, he cut down on Playoff contender Brennan Poole early in the race as a lapped car, eliminating Poole from the race and ending his championship hopes. Poole later sounded off on the dangers of lapped cars, as did Monster Energy NASCAR Cup Series driver Austin Dillon, who was running the race. Referring to Bacarella's overall driving, Dillon said over in-car communications, "Get that guy off the freaking track, man! Where did he get a license to do this?" Poole, for his part, commented on what he saw as the need for NASCAR to look at how it approves drivers for competition. Bacarella finished 30th in the race, and ran the following week at Homestead, finishing 31st.

During the off-season, Bacarella was tapped to drive the No. 8 car once again at the season opener at Daytona in 2018.

On August 30, 2021, it was announced that Bacarella and Tommy Joe Martins will form Alpha Prime Racing, and will compete full-time in the Xfinity Series in 2022. Bacarella, Martins, and Rajah Caruth are expected to run the full season under part-time schedules. On November 22, NASCAR indefinitely suspended Bacarella for substance abuse after he claimed he unknowingly took a workout supplement that is on the banned substances list. Bacarella has since enrolled in the Road to Recovery program and is expected to return for the Daytona race. On February 14, 2022, Bacarella was reinstated by NASCAR.

For 2023, Bacarella continued to run a partial schedule in the Xfinity Series. On April 22 at Talladega, Bacarella scored his first career Xfinity Series top-ten with a sixth-place finish.

On January 3, 2024, Bacarella and Alpha Prime announced that he would run at least four races in the No. 45 on superspeedways in the Xfinity Series during the 2024 season, starting with the February Daytona race. Bacarella scored his second career top-ten at Talladega with a seventh-place finish. He would then score his third career top-ten at Michigan, his first top-ten on a non-superspeedway.

On August 18, 2025, Alpha Prime announced that Bacarella would drive a fourth entry for the team at Daytona, which is the No. 5, using the owner's points from the now-defunct Our Motorsports team of the same number. At the fall Talladega race, Bacarella scored a new career-best fifth-place finish, his first top-five in the series.

On January 28, 2026, it was announced that Bacarella would compete in the season-opening United Rentals 300 at Daytona International Speedway, driving the No. 4 entry for Alpha Prime Racing. Bacarella qualified 26th but gave up his seat to full-time driver Anthony Alfredo, who was not fast enough in qualifying to make the race on speed.

== Motorsports career results ==
=== Racing career summary ===
Season	Series	Team	Races	Wins	Top 5	Top 10	Points	Position
2017	ARCA Racing Series	Finney Racing	2	0	0	0	170	92nd
2017	NASCAR Xfinity Series	B. J. McLeod Motorsports	2	0	0	0	13	68th
2018	NASCAR Xfinity Series	B. J. McLeod Motorsports	4	0	0	0	45	52nd
2018	NASCAR Xfinity Series	DGM Racing	1	0	0	0	45	52nd
2019	NASCAR Xfinity Series	DGM Racing	3	0	0	0	17	67th
2020	NASCAR Xfinity Series	DGM Racing	6	0	0	0	68	46th
2021	NASCAR Xfinity Series	DGM Racing	5	0	0	0	37	54th
2022	NASCAR Xfinity Series	Alpha Prime Racing	5	0	0	0	37	54th
2023	NASCAR Xfinity Series	Alpha Prime Racing	3	0	0	1	38	51st
2024	NASCAR Xfinity Series	Alpha Prime Racing	3	0	0	2	46	52nd
2025	NASCAR Xfinity Series	Alpha Prime Racing	4	0	1	1	72	42nd
2026	NASCAR O'Reilly Auto Parts Series	Alpha Prime Racing	1	0	0	0	6*	61st*

=== NASCAR ===
(key) (Bold – Pole position awarded by qualifying time. Italics – Pole position earned by points standings or practice time. * – Most laps led.)

==== O'Reilly Auto Parts Series ====
NASCAR O'Reilly Auto Parts Series results
Year	Team	No.	Make	1	2	3	4	5	6	7	8	9	10	11	12	13	14	15	16	17	18	19	20	21	22	23	24	25	26	27	28	29	30	31	32	33	NOAPSC	Pts	Ref
2017	B. J. McLeod Motorsports	8	Chevy	DAY	ATL	LVS	PHO	CAL	TEX	BRI	RCH	TAL	CLT	DOV	POC	MCH	IOW	DAY	KEN	NHA	IND	IOW	GLN	MOH	BRI	ROA	DAR	RCH	CHI	KEN	DOV	CLT	KAN	TEX	PHO; 30	HOM; 31	68th	13	
2018	B. J. McLeod Motorsports	8	Toyota	DAY; 13	ATL	LVS	PHO	CAL	TEX	BRI	RCH	TAL	DOV	CLT	POC																						52nd	45	
2018	B. J. McLeod Motorsports	8	Chevy													MCH; 34	IOW	CHI	DAY; 38	KEN	NHA	IOW	GLN	MOH	BRI	ROA	DAR	IND; 23	LVS	RCH	ROV	DOV	KAN	TEX	PHO		52nd	45	
2018	DGM Racing	90	Chevy																																	HOM; 34	52nd	45	
2019	DGM Racing	90	Chevy	DAY; 29	ATL	LVS	PHO	CAL; 37	TEX	BRI	RCH	TAL	DOV	CLT	POC	MCH	IOW	CHI	DAY; 29	KEN	NHA	IOW	GLN	MOH	BRI	ROA	DAR	IND	LVS	RCH	ROV	DOV	KAN	TEX	PHO	HOM	67th	17	
2020	DGM Racing	90	Chevy	DAY; 29	LVS	CAL	PHO	DAR	CLT	BRI	ATL	HOM; 29	HOM; 30	TAL; 17	POC	IRC	KEN	KEN	TEX	KAN	ROA	DRC	DOV	DOV	DAY; 36	DAR	RCH	RCH	BRI	LVS	TAL; 13	ROV	KAN	TEX	MAR	PHO	46th	68	
2021	DGM Racing	90	Chevy	DAY; 12	DRC	HOM	LVS	PHO	ATL	MAR	TAL; 38	DAR	DOV	COA; DNQ	CLT	MOH	TEX	NSH	POC	ROA	ATL	NHA	GLN	IRC	MCH; 35	DAY; 36	DAR	RCH	BRI	LVS	TAL; 32	ROV	TEX	KAN	MAR	PHO	54th	37	
2022	Alpha Prime Racing	45	Chevy	DAY; 38	CAL	LVS	PHO	ATL	COA	RCH	MAR	TAL; 25	DOV	DAR	TEX	CLT	PIR	NSH	ROA	ATL; 28	NHA	POC	IRC	MCH	GLN	DAY; 28	DAR	KAN	BRI	TEX	TAL; 31	ROV	LVS	HOM	MAR	PHO	54th	37	
2023	Alpha Prime Racing	45	Chevy	DAY; INQ^{†}	CAL	LVS	PHO																														51st	38	
2023	Alpha Prime Racing	66	Chevy					ATL; 38	COA	RCH	MAR																										51st	38	
2023	Alpha Prime Racing	43	Chevy									TAL; 6	DOV	DAR	CLT	PIR	SON	NSH	CSC	ATL	NHA	POC	ROA	MCH	IRC	GLN											51st	38	
2023	Alpha Prime Racing	44	Chevy																								DAY; 31	DAR	KAN	BRI	TEX	ROV	LVS	HOM	MAR	PHO	51st	38	
2024	Alpha Prime Racing	45	Chevy	DAY; DNQ	ATL	LVS	PHO	COA	RCH	MAR	TEX	TAL; 7	DOV	DAR	CLT	PIR	SON	IOW	NHA	NSH	CSC	POC	IND	MCH; 9	DAY; 29	DAR	ATL	GLN	BRI	KAN	TAL; QL^{‡}	ROV	LVS	HOM	MAR	PHO	52nd	46	
2025	Alpha Prime Racing	45	Chevy	DAY; 13	ATL	COA	PHO	LVS	HOM	MAR	DAR	BRI	CAR	TAL; 30	TEX	CLT	NSH	MXC	POC	ATL	CSC	SON	DOV	IND	IOW	GLN											42nd	72	
2025	Alpha Prime Racing	5	Chevy																								DAY; 28	PIR	GTW	BRI	KAN	ROV	LVS	TAL; 5	MAR	PHO	42nd	72	
2026	Alpha Prime Racing	4	Chevy	DAY; QL^{¶}	ATL	COA	PHO	LVS	DAR	MAR	CAR	BRI	KAN	TAL	TEX	GLN	DOV	CLT	NSH	POC	COR	SON	CHI	ATL	IND	IOW	DAY; 31	DAR	GTW	BRI	LVS	CLT	PHO	TAL; 37	MAR	HOM	62nd	7	
^{†} – Qualified but replaced by Stefan Parsons ^{‡} – Qualified but replaced by Tommy Joe Martins ^{¶} – Qualified but replaced by Anthony Alfredo

^{*} Season still in progress
^{1} Ineligible for series points

=== ARCA Racing Series ===
(key) (Bold – Pole position awarded by qualifying time. Italics – Pole position earned by points standings or practice time. * – Most laps led.)

ARCA Racing Series results
Year	Team	No.	Make	1	2	3	4	5	6	7	8	9	10	11	12	13	14	15	16	17	18	19	20	ARSC	Pts	Ref
2017	Finney Racing	80	Chevy	DAY; 33	NSH	SLM	TAL; 25	TOL	ELK	POC	MCH	MAD	IOW	IRP	POC	WIN	ISF	ROA	DSF	SLM	CHI	KEN	KAN	92nd	170	
