= 2018 PowerShares QQQ 300 =

First race of the 2018 NASCAR Xfinity Series

Race details
- Race 1 of 33 of the 2018 NASCAR Xfinity Series
- Date: February 17, 2018
- Official name: PowerShares QQQ 300
- Location: Daytona Beach, Florida, Daytona International Speedway
- Course: Permanent racing facility
- Course length: 2.5 miles (4.0 km)
- Distance: 143 laps, 357.5 mi (575.34 km)
- Scheduled distance: 120 laps, 300 mi (482.803 km)
- Average speed: 119.1 miles per hour (191.7 km/h)

Pole position
Driver	Daniel Hemric	Richard Childress Racing
- Time: 47.541

Most laps led
Driver	Kyle Larson	Chip Ganassi Racing
- Laps: 61

Winner
No. 9	Tyler Reddick	JR Motorsports

Television in the United States
- Network: Fox Sports 1
- Announcers: Adam Alexander, Michael Waltrip, Brad Keselowski

Radio in the United States
- Radio: Motor Racing Network

The 2018 PowerShares QQQ 300 was the 1st stock car race of the 2018 NASCAR Xfinity Series season, and the 37th iteration of the event. The race was held on Saturday, February 17, 2018 in Daytona Beach, Florida at Daytona International Speedway, a 2.5 miles (4.0 km) permanent triangular-shaped superspeedway. The race was extended from the scheduled 120 laps to 143 laps due to five NASCAR overtime attempts. At race's end, Tyler Reddick of JR Motorsports would best out teammate Elliott Sadler in the closest finish in NASCAR history, beating Sadler out by only 0.0004 seconds. To fill out the podium, Ryan Reed of Roush Fenway Racing would finish 3rd.

== Background ==
The layout of Daytona International Speedway, the venue where the race was held.

Daytona International Speedway is one of three superspeedways to hold NASCAR races, the other two being Indianapolis Motor Speedway and Talladega Superspeedway. The standard track at Daytona International Speedway is a four-turn superspeedway that is 2.5 miles (4.0 km) long. The track's turns are banked at 31 degrees, while the front stretch, the location of the finish line, is banked at 18 degrees.

=== Entry list ===
#	Driver	Team	Make	Sponsor
0	Garrett Smithley	JD Motorsports	Chevrolet	Flex Tape
00	Cole Custer	Stewart-Haas Racing with Biagi-DenBeste	Ford	Haas CNC
1	Elliott Sadler	JR Motorsports	Chevrolet	OneMain Financial "Lending Done Human"
01	Vinnie Miller	JD Motorsports	Chevrolet	Flex Glue
2	Matt Tifft	Richard Childress Racing	Chevrolet	Nexteer
3	Austin Dillon	Richard Childress Racing	Chevrolet	Cabela's, Bass Pro Shops
4	Ross Chastain	JD Motorsports	Chevrolet	Flex Seal
5	Michael Annett	JR Motorsports	Chevrolet	Pilot Flying J
7	Justin Allgaier	JR Motorsports	Chevrolet	Brandt Professional Agriculture
8	Caesar Bacarella	B. J. McLeod Motorsports	Toyota	Alpha Prime Regimen
9	Tyler Reddick	JR Motorsports	Chevrolet	BurgerFi
11	Ryan Truex	Kaulig Racing	Chevrolet	Bar Harbor
15	Joe Nemechek	JD Motorsports	Chevrolet	D. A. B. Constructors, Inc., Fleetwing
16	Ryan Reed	Roush Fenway Racing	Ford	DriveDownA1C.com
18	Daniel Suárez	Joe Gibbs Racing	Toyota	Interstate Batteries
19	Brandon Jones	Joe Gibbs Racing	Toyota	Juniper Networks
20	Christopher Bell	Joe Gibbs Racing	Toyota	Rheem
21	Daniel Hemric	Richard Childress Racing	Chevrolet	South Point Hotel, Casino & Spa
22	Joey Logano	Team Penske	Ford	Fitzgerald Glider Kits
23	Spencer Gallagher	GMS Racing	Chevrolet	Allegiant Air
24	Kaz Grala	JGL Racing	Ford	Nettts
25	Chris Cockrum	Chris Cockrum Racing	Chevrolet	Advanced Communications Group
28	Dylan Lupton	JGL Racing	Ford	ThinQ Technology Partners
35	Joey Gase	Go Green Racing with SS-Green Light Racing	Chevrolet	Sparks Energy
36	Alex Labbé	DGM Racing	Chevrolet	Wholey's, Can-Am
38	Jeff Green	RSS Racing	Chevrolet	Night Owl Contractors
39	J. J. Yeley	RSS Racing	Chevrolet	Superior Essex
40	Chad Finchum	MBM Motorsports	Toyota	Smithbilt Homes
42	Kyle Larson	Chip Ganassi Racing	Chevrolet	DC Solar
45	Josh Bilicki	JP Motorsports	Toyota	Prevagen
51	Jeremy Clements	Jeremy Clements Racing	Chevrolet	RepairableVehicles.com
52	David Starr	Jimmy Means Racing	Chevrolet	Whataburger
54	Gray Gaulding	NXT Motorsports	Toyota	Earthwater, VS1 Racing
55	Stephen Leicht	JP Motorsports	Toyota	Jani-King "The King of Clean"
60	Austin Cindric	Roush Fenway Racing	Ford	Pirtek
66	Timmy Hill	MBM Motorsports	Toyota	CrashClaimsR.Us
74	Mike Harmon	Mike Harmon Racing	Dodge	Shadow Warriors Project
76	Spencer Boyd	SS-Green Light Racing	Chevrolet	Grunt Style "This We'll Defend"
78	Ryan Ellis	B. J. McLeod Motorsports	Toyota	Densify
86	Brandon Brown	Brandonbilt Motorsports	Chevrolet	CONO.io, Coastal Carolina University
88	Chase Elliott	JR Motorsports	Chevrolet	Hellmann's
89	Morgan Shepherd	Shepherd Racing Ventures	Chevrolet	Visone RV Motorhome Parts, Racing with Jesus
90	Josh Williams	DGM Racing	Chevrolet	Star Tron, Sleep Well Sleep Disorder Specialists
93	Ryan Sieg	RSS Racing	Chevrolet	Code Rum "Keep To The Code."
98	Aric Almirola	Stewart-Haas Racing with Biagi-DenBeste	Ford	DenBeste Water Solutions, Smithfield
99	Ray Black Jr.	B. J. McLeod Motorsports	Toyota	America's Donuts, Zomongo
Official entry list

== Practice ==
=== First practice ===
First practice was held on Friday, February 16, at 12:05 PM EST. Tyler Reddick of JR Motorsports would set the fastest lap, with a 45.874 and an average speed of 196.190 miles per hour (315.737 km/h).

Pos.	#	Driver	Team	Make	Time	Speed
1	9	Tyler Reddick	JR Motorsports	Chevrolet	45.874	196.190
2	18	Daniel Suárez	Joe Gibbs Racing	Toyota	45.927	195.963
3	23	Spencer Gallagher	GMS Racing	Chevrolet	45.973	195.767
Full first practice results

=== Second practice ===
The second and final practice was held on Friday, February 16, at 2:05 PM EST. Daniel Hemric of Richard Childress Racing would set the fastest lap, with a 47.041 and an average speed of 191.322 miles per hour (307.903 km/h).

Pos.	#	Driver	Team	Make	Time	Speed
1	21	Daniel Hemric	Richard Childress Racing	Chevrolet	47.041	191.322
2	3	Austin Dillon	Richard Childress Racing	Chevrolet	47.044	191.310
3	1	Elliott Sadler	JR Motorsports	Chevrolet	47.231	190.553
Full final practice results

== Qualifying ==
Qualifying would take place on Saturday, February 17, at 9:35 AM EST. Since Daytona International Speedway is at least 2 miles (3.2 km), the qualifying system was a single car, single lap, two round system where in the first round, everyone would set a time to determine positions 13-40. Then, the fastest 12 qualifiers would move on to the second round to determine positions 1-12.

Daniel Hemric of Richard Childress Racing would advance from Round 1 and set the fastest lap in Round 2, with a time of 47.541 and an average speed of 189.310 miles per hour (304.665 km/h), winning the pole for the race.

The drivers that would fail to qualify would consist of: Ray Black Jr., Chris Cockrum, Timmy Hill, Morgan Shepherd, Josh Bilicki, and Mike Harmon. Originally, Timmy Hill was slated to qualify for the race after qualifying on owner's points, supposed to be starting in 36th. However, the times of Matt Tifft and Josh Williams were both disallowed after they both failed post-qualifying inspection. This would allow Gray Gaulding, previously a non-qualifier, to make the race and bump Hill out of the race.

=== Full starting lineup ===
Pos.	#	Driver	Team	Make	Time (R1)	Speed (R1)	Time (R2)	Speed (R2)
1	21	Daniel Hemric	Richard Childress Racing	Chevrolet	47.672	188.790	47.541	189.310
2	42	Kyle Larson	Chip Ganassi Racing	Chevrolet	47.839	188.131	47.624	188.980
3	22	Joey Logano	Team Penske	Ford	47.789	188.328	47.808	188.253
4	23	Spencer Gallagher	GMS Racing	Chevrolet	47.914	187.837	47.839	188.131
5	7	Justin Allgaier	JR Motorsports	Chevrolet	47.931	187.770	47.843	188.115
6	11	Ryan Truex	Kaulig Racing	Chevrolet	47.976	187.594	47.846	188.103
7	5	Michael Annett	JR Motorsports	Chevrolet	47.926	187.790	47.857	188.060
8	88	Chase Elliott	JR Motorsports	Chevrolet	48.212	186.676	48.117	187.044
9	9	Tyler Reddick	JR Motorsports	Chevrolet	48.148	186.924	48.143	186.943
10	60	Austin Cindric	Roush Fenway Racing	Ford	48.149	186.920	48.188	186.768
11	1	Elliott Sadler	JR Motorsports	Chevrolet	48.044	187.328	—	—
12	98	Aric Almirola	Stewart-Haas Racing with Biagi-DenBeste	Ford	48.242	186.559	—	—
Eliminated in Round 1
13	20	Christopher Bell	Joe Gibbs Racing	Toyota	48.294	186.359	—	—
14	00	Cole Custer	Stewart-Haas Racing with Biagi-DenBeste	Ford	48.328	186.227	—	—
15	16	Ryan Reed	Roush Fenway Racing	Ford	48.410	185.912	—	—
16	15	Joe Nemechek	JD Motorsports	Chevrolet	48.450	185.759	—	—
17	18	Daniel Suárez	Joe Gibbs Racing	Toyota	48.457	185.732	—	—
18	19	Brandon Jones	Joe Gibbs Racing	Toyota	48.459	185.724	—	—
19	35	Joey Gase	Go Green Racing with SS-Green Light Racing	Chevrolet	48.594	185.208	—	—
20	28	Dylan Lupton	JGL Racing	Ford	48.710	184.767	—	—
21	93	Ryan Sieg	RSS Racing	Chevrolet	48.723	184.718	—	—
22	36	Alex Labbé	DGM Racing	Chevrolet	48.738	184.661	—	—
23	4	Ross Chastain	JD Motorsports	Chevrolet	48.799	184.430	—	—
24	51	Jeremy Clements	Jeremy Clements Racing	Chevrolet	48.826	184.328	—	—
25	0	Garrett Smithley	JD Motorsports	Chevrolet	48.861	184.196	—	—
26	01	Vinnie Miller	JD Motorsports	Chevrolet	49.016	183.614	—	—
27	24	Kaz Grala	JGL Racing	Ford	49.081	183.370	—	—
28	86	Brandon Brown	Brandonbilt Motorsports	Chevrolet	49.108	183.270	—	—
29	78	Ryan Ellis	B. J. McLeod Motorsports	Toyota	49.116	183.240	—	—
30	8	Caesar Bacarella	B. J. McLeod Motorsports	Toyota	49.224	182.838	—	—
31	38	Jeff Green	RSS Racing	Chevrolet	49.227	182.826	—	—
32	52	David Starr	Jimmy Means Racing	Chevrolet	49.327	182.456	—	—
33	54	Gray Gaulding	NXT Motorsports	Toyota	49.453	181.991	—	—
Qualified by owner's points
34	76	Spencer Boyd	SS-Green Light Racing	Chevrolet	49.505	181.800	—	—
35	55	Stephen Leicht	JP Motorsports	Toyota	50.192	179.311	—	—
36	40	Chad Finchum	MBM Motorsports	Toyota	51.453	174.917	—	—
37	39	J. J. Yeley	RSS Racing	Chevrolet	51.660	174.216	—	—
38	3	Austin Dillon	Richard Childress Racing	Chevrolet	—	—	—	—
Qualified by time
39	2	Matt Tifft	Richard Childress Racing	Chevrolet	47.708*	188.648*	47.640*	188.917*
40	90	Josh Williams	DGM Racing	Chevrolet	48.937*	183.910*	—	—
Failed to qualify
41	99	Ray Black Jr.	B. J. McLeod Motorsports	Toyota	49.467	181.939	—	—
42	25	Chris Cockrum	Chris Cockrum Racing	Chevrolet	49.475	181.910	—	—
43	66	Timmy Hill	MBM Motorsports	Toyota	49.511	181.778	—	—
44	89	Morgan Shepherd	Shepherd Racing Ventures	Chevrolet	49.805	180.705	—	—
45	45	Josh Bilicki	JP Motorsports	Toyota	50.681	177.581	—	—
46	74	Mike Harmon	Mike Harmon Racing	Dodge	—	—	—	—
Official qualifying results
Official starting lineup

*Times disallowed after Tifft and Williams both failed post-qualifying inspection.

== Race results ==
Stage 1 Laps: 30

Fin	#	Driver	Team	Make	Pts
1	42	Kyle Larson	Chip Ganassi Racing	Chevrolet	0
2	22	Joey Logano	Team Penske	Ford	0
3	7	Justin Allgaier	JR Motorsports	Chevrolet	8
4	9	Tyler Reddick	JR Motorsports	Chevrolet	7
5	1	Elliott Sadler	JR Motorsports	Chevrolet	6
6	21	Daniel Hemric	Richard Childress Racing	Chevrolet	5
7	5	Michael Annett	JR Motorsports	Chevrolet	4
8	18	Daniel Suárez	Joe Gibbs Racing	Toyota	0
9	23	Spencer Gallagher	GMS Racing	Chevrolet	2
10	00	Cole Custer	Stewart-Haas Racing with Biagi-DenBeste	Ford	1

Stage 2 Laps: 30

Fin	#	Driver	Team	Make	Pts
1	88	Chase Elliott	JR Motorsports	Chevrolet	0
2	98	Aric Almirola	Stewart-Haas Racing with Biagi-DenBeste	Ford	0
3	42	Kyle Larson	Chip Ganassi Racing	Chevrolet	0
4	18	Daniel Suárez	Joe Gibbs Racing	Toyota	0
5	23	Spencer Gallagher	GMS Racing	Chevrolet	6
6	11	Ryan Truex	Kaulig Racing	Chevrolet	5
7	3	Austin Dillon	Richard Childress Racing	Chevrolet	0
8	9	Tyler Reddick	JR Motorsports	Chevrolet	3
9	21	Daniel Hemric	Richard Childress Racing	Chevrolet	2
10	7	Justin Allgaier	JR Motorsports	Chevrolet	1

Stage 3 Laps: 83

Fin	St	#	Driver	Team	Make	Laps	Led	Status	Pts
1	9	9	Tyler Reddick	JR Motorsports	Chevrolet	143	11	running	50
2	11	1	Elliott Sadler	JR Motorsports	Chevrolet	143	2	running	41
3	15	16	Ryan Reed	Roush Fenway Racing	Ford	143	3	running	34
4	27	24	Kaz Grala	JGL Racing	Ford	143	0	running	33
5	25	0	Garrett Smithley	JD Motorsports	Chevrolet	143	2	running	32
6	4	23	Spencer Gallagher	GMS Racing	Chevrolet	143	0	running	39
7	6	11	Ryan Truex	Kaulig Racing	Chevrolet	143	3	running	35
8	17	18	Daniel Suárez	Joe Gibbs Racing	Toyota	143	5	running	0
9	23	4	Ross Chastain	JD Motorsports	Chevrolet	143	0	running	28
10	18	19	Brandon Jones	Joe Gibbs Racing	Toyota	143	0	running	27
11	31	38	Jeff Green	RSS Racing	Chevrolet	143	0	running	26
12	8	88	Chase Elliott	JR Motorsports	Chevrolet	143	17	running	0
13	30	8	Caesar Bacarella	B. J. McLeod Motorsports	Toyota	143	0	running	24
14	14	00	Cole Custer	Stewart-Haas Racing with Biagi-DenBeste	Ford	143	0	running	24
15	35	55	Stephen Leicht	JP Motorsports	Toyota	143	0	running	22
16	24	51	Jeremy Clements	Jeremy Clements Racing	Chevrolet	143	0	running	21
17	32	52	David Starr	Jimmy Means Racing	Chevrolet	143	0	running	20
18	37	39	J. J. Yeley	RSS Racing	Chevrolet	143	0	running	19
19	39	2	Matt Tifft	Richard Childress Racing	Chevrolet	143	0	running	18
20	26	01	Vinnie Miller	JD Motorsports	Chevrolet	143	0	running	17
21	21	93	Ryan Sieg	RSS Racing	Chevrolet	143	0	running	16
22	40	90	Josh Williams	DGM Racing	Chevrolet	143	0	running	15
23	16	15	Joe Nemechek	JD Motorsports	Chevrolet	143	0	running	0
24	22	36	Alex Labbé	DGM Racing	Chevrolet	142	0	running	13
25	34	76	Spencer Boyd	SS-Green Light Racing	Chevrolet	142	0	running	12
26	1	21	Daniel Hemric	Richard Childress Racing	Chevrolet	140	7	running	18
27	20	28	Dylan Lupton	JGL Racing	Ford	137	0	crash	10
28	36	40	Chad Finchum	MBM Motorsports	Toyota	136	0	running	9
29	2	42	Kyle Larson	Chip Ganassi Racing	Chevrolet	134	61	crash	0
30	29	78	Ryan Ellis	B. J. McLeod Motorsports	Toyota	133	0	crash	7
31	5	7	Justin Allgaier	JR Motorsports	Chevrolet	124	0	crash	15
32	38	3	Austin Dillon	Richard Childress Racing	Chevrolet	122	0	crash	0
33	19	35	Joey Gase	Go Green Racing with SS-Green Light Racing	Chevrolet	122	0	crash	4
34	3	22	Joey Logano	Team Penske	Ford	121	28	crash	0
35	12	98	Aric Almirola	Stewart-Haas Racing with Biagi-DenBeste	Ford	121	4	crash	0
36	28	86	Brandon Brown	Brandonbilt Motorsports	Chevrolet	121	0	crash	1
37	7	5	Michael Annett	JR Motorsports	Chevrolet	106	0	crash	5
38	33	54	Gray Gaulding	NXT Motorsports	Toyota	82	0	rear gear	0
39	13	20	Christopher Bell	Joe Gibbs Racing	Toyota	11	0	crash	1
40	10	60	Austin Cindric	Roush Fenway Racing	Ford	10	0	crash	1
Failed to qualify
41		99	Ray Black Jr.	B. J. McLeod Motorsports	Toyota				
42		25	Chris Cockrum	Chris Cockrum Racing	Chevrolet				
43		66	Timmy Hill	MBM Motorsports	Toyota				
44		89	Morgan Shepherd	Shepherd Racing Ventures	Chevrolet				
45		45	Josh Bilicki	JP Motorsports	Toyota				
46		74	Mike Harmon	Mike Harmon Racing	Dodge				
Official race results

Previous race: 2017 Ford EcoBoost 300	NASCAR Xfinity Series; 2018 season	Next race: 2018 Rinnai 250
