= 2017 Ticket Galaxy 200 =

32nd race of the 2017 NASCAR Xfinity Series

Race details
- Race 32 of 33 in the 2017 NASCAR Xfinity Series
- Date: November 11, 2017
- Official name: 19th Annual Ticket Galaxy 200
- Location: Avondale, Arizona, Phoenix International Raceway
- Course: Permanent racing facility
- Course length: 1 miles (1.6 km)
- Distance: 200 laps, 200 mi (321.868 km)
- Scheduled distance: 200 laps, 200 mi (321.868 km)
- Average speed: 104.758 miles per hour (168.592 km/h)

Pole position
Driver	Erik Jones	Joe Gibbs Racing
- Time: 26.880

Most laps led
Driver	Ryan Blaney	Team Penske
- Laps: 147

Winner
No. 9	William Byron	JR Motorsports

Television in the United States
- Network: NBC
- Announcers: Rick Allen, Jeff Burton, Steve Letarte

Radio in the United States
- Radio: Motor Racing Network

The 2017 Ticket Galaxy 200 was the 32nd stock car race of the 2017 NASCAR Xfinity Series season, the third and elimination race of the Round of 8, and the 19th iteration of the event. The race was held on Saturday, November 11, 2017, in Avondale, Arizona at Phoenix International Raceway, a 1-mile (1.6 km) permanent low-banked tri-oval race track. The race took the scheduled 200 laps to complete. On the final restart with 17 to go, with the help of his pit crew, William Byron, driving for JR Motorsports, would manage to pull away from the field to win his fourth and to date, final career NASCAR Xfinity Series victory, his fourth and final win of the season, and a guaranteed spot in the Championship 4. To fill out the podium, Ryan Blaney, driving for Team Penske, and Erik Jones, driving for Joe Gibbs Racing, would finish second and third, respectively.

The drivers to qualify for the Championship 4 were William Byron, Justin Allgaier, Elliott Sadler, and Daniel Hemric.

== Entry list ==
- (R) denotes rookie driver.

#	Driver	Team	Make
0	Garrett Smithley	JD Motorsports	Chevrolet
00	Cole Custer (R)	Stewart–Haas Racing	Ford
1	Elliott Sadler	JR Motorsports	Chevrolet
01	Harrison Rhodes	JD Motorsports	Chevrolet
2	Austin Dillon (i)	Richard Childress Racing	Chevrolet
3	Ty Dillon (i)	Richard Childress Racing	Chevrolet
4	Ross Chastain	JD Motorsports	Chevrolet
5	Michael Annett	JR Motorsports	Chevrolet
7	Justin Allgaier	JR Motorsports	Chevrolet
07	Ray Black Jr.	SS-Green Light Racing	Chevrolet
8	Caesar Bacarella	B. J. McLeod Motorsports	Chevrolet
9	William Byron (R)	JR Motorsports	Chevrolet
11	Blake Koch	Kaulig Racing	Chevrolet
13	Carl Long	MBM Motorsports	Toyota
14	J. J. Yeley	TriStar Motorsports	Toyota
15	Joe Nemechek (i)	JD Motorsports	Chevrolet
16	Ryan Reed	Roush Fenway Racing	Ford
18	Christopher Bell (i)	Joe Gibbs Racing	Toyota
19	Matt Tifft (R)	Joe Gibbs Racing	Toyota
20	Erik Jones (i)	Joe Gibbs Racing	Toyota
21	Daniel Hemric (R)	Richard Childress Racing	Chevrolet
22	Ryan Blaney (i)	Team Penske	Ford
23	Spencer Gallagher (R)	GMS Racing	Chevrolet
24	Corey LaJoie (i)	JGL Racing	Toyota
33	Brandon Jones	Richard Childress Racing	Chevrolet
38	Jeff Green	RSS Racing	Chevrolet
39	Ryan Sieg	RSS Racing	Chevrolet
40	Timmy Hill	MBM Motorsports	Chevrolet
42	Alex Bowman (i)	Chip Ganassi Racing	Chevrolet
48	Brennan Poole	Chip Ganassi Racing	Chevrolet
51	Jeremy Clements	Jeremy Clements Racing	Chevrolet
52	Joey Gase	Jimmy Means Racing	Chevrolet
62	Brendan Gaughan	Richard Childress Racing	Chevrolet
74	Mike Harmon	Mike Harmon Racing	Dodge
78	John Graham	B. J. McLeod Motorsports	Chevrolet
89	Morgan Shepherd	Shepherd Racing Ventures	Chevrolet
90	Mario Gosselin	King Autosport	Chevrolet
93	Gray Gaulding (i)	RSS Racing	Chevrolet
98	Casey Mears	Biagi-DenBeste Racing	Ford
99	David Starr	BJMM with SS-Green Light Racing	Chevrolet
Official entry list

== Practice ==
=== First practice ===
The first practice session was held on Friday, November 10, at 12:30 PM MST. The session would last for 55 minutes. Ryan Blaney, driving for Team Penske, would set the fastest time in the session, with a lap of 27.404 and an average speed of 131.368 mph (211.416 km/h).

Pos.	#	Driver	Team	Make	Time	Speed
1	22	Ryan Blaney (i)	Team Penske	Ford	27.404	131.368
2	7	Justin Allgaier	JR Motorsports	Chevrolet	27.448	131.157
3	19	Matt Tifft (R)	Joe Gibbs Racing	Toyota	27.452	131.138
Full first practice results

=== Second and final practice ===
The final practice session, sometimes known as Happy Hour, was held on Friday, November 10, at 2:30 PM MST. The session would last for 55 minutes. William Byron, driving for JR Motorsports, would set the fastest time in the session, with a lap of 27.343 and an average speed of 131.661 mph (211.888 km/h).

Pos.	#	Driver	Team	Make	Time	Speed
1	9	William Byron (R)	JR Motorsports	Chevrolet	27.343	131.661
2	7	Justin Allgaier	JR Motorsports	Chevrolet	27.463	131.085
3	18	Christopher Bell (i)	Joe Gibbs Racing	Toyota	27.489	130.961
Full Happy Hour practice results

== Qualifying ==
Qualifying was held on Saturday, November 11, at 10:35 AM MST. Since Phoenix International Raceway is under 2 miles (3.2 km) in length, the qualifying system was a multi-car system that included three rounds. The first round was 15 minutes, where every driver would be able to set a lap within the 15 minutes. Then, the second round would consist of the fastest 24 cars in Round 1, and drivers would have 10 minutes to set a lap. Round 3 consisted of the fastest 12 drivers from Round 2, and the drivers would have 5 minutes to set a time. Whoever was fastest in Round 3 would win the pole.

Erik Jones, driving for Joe Gibbs Racing, would win the pole after setting a time of 26.880 and an average speed of 133.929 mph (215.538 km/h) in the third round.

No drivers would fail to qualify.

=== Full qualifying results ===
Pos.	#	Driver	Team	Make	Time (R1)	Speed (R1)	Time (R2)	Speed (R2)	Time (R3)	Speed (R3)
1	20	Erik Jones (i)	Joe Gibbs Racing	Toyota	27.722	129.861	27.186	132.421	26.880	133.929
2	9	William Byron (R)	JR Motorsports	Chevrolet	27.341	131.670	27.103	132.827	27.018	133.245
3	00	Cole Custer (R)	Stewart–Haas Racing	Ford	27.426	131.262	27.171	132.494	27.034	133.166
4	19	Matt Tifft (R)	Joe Gibbs Racing	Toyota	27.519	130.819	27.178	132.460	27.076	132.959
5	42	Alex Bowman (i)	Chip Ganassi Racing	Chevrolet	27.493	130.942	27.293	131.902	27.082	132.930
6	22	Ryan Blaney (i)	Team Penske	Ford	27.453	131.133	27.169	132.504	27.108	132.802
7	21	Daniel Hemric (R)	Richard Childress Racing	Chevrolet	27.584	130.510	27.223	132.241	27.168	132.509
8	18	Christopher Bell (i)	Joe Gibbs Racing	Toyota	27.285	131.941	27.073	132.974	27.177	132.465
9	11	Blake Koch	Kaulig Racing	Chevrolet	27.777	129.604	27.310	131.820	27.233	132.193
10	7	Justin Allgaier	JR Motorsports	Chevrolet	27.552	130.662	27.152	132.587	27.303	131.854
11	62	Brendan Gaughan	Richard Childress Racing	Chevrolet	27.679	130.063	27.308	131.830	27.387	131.449
12	5	Michael Annett	JR Motorsports	Chevrolet	27.690	130.011	27.315	131.796	27.404	131.368
Eliminated in Round 2
13	1	Elliott Sadler	JR Motorsports	Chevrolet	27.691	130.006	27.325	131.747	-	-
14	48	Brennan Poole	Chip Ganassi Racing	Chevrolet	27.428	131.253	27.331	131.719	-	-
15	33	Brandon Jones	Richard Childress Racing	Chevrolet	27.761	129.678	27.332	131.714	-	-
16	2	Austin Dillon (i)	Richard Childress Racing	Chevrolet	27.585	130.506	27.356	131.598	-	-
17	24	Corey LaJoie (i)	JGL Racing	Toyota	27.838	129.320	27.364	131.560	-	-
18	98	Casey Mears	Biagi-DenBeste Racing	Ford	27.689	130.016	27.388	131.444	-	-
19	23	Spencer Gallagher (R)	GMS Racing	Chevrolet	27.507	130.876	27.553	130.657	-	-
20	16	Ryan Reed	Roush Fenway Racing	Ford	27.722	129.861	27.560	130.624	-	-
21	3	Ty Dillon (i)	Richard Childress Racing	Chevrolet	27.657	130.166	27.561	130.619	-	-
22	4	Ross Chastain	JD Motorsports	Chevrolet	27.753	129.716	27.673	130.091	-	-
23	14	J. J. Yeley	TriStar Motorsports	Toyota	27.763	129.669	27.676	130.077	-	-
24	51	Jeremy Clements	Jeremy Clements Racing	Chevrolet	27.770	129.636	27.722	129.861	-	-
Eliminated in Round 1
25	07	Ray Black Jr.	SS-Green Light Racing	Chevrolet	27.988	128.627	-	-	-	-
26	39	Ryan Sieg	RSS Racing	Chevrolet	28.074	128.233	-	-	-	-
27	15	Joe Nemechek (i)	JD Motorsports	Chevrolet	28.209	127.619	-	-	-	-
28	52	Joey Gase	Jimmy Means Racing	Chevrolet	28.276	127.316	-	-	-	-
29	0	Garrett Smithley	JD Motorsports	Chevrolet	28.277	127.312	-	-	-	-
30	99	David Starr	BJMM with SS-Green Light Racing	Chevrolet	28.336	127.047	-	-	-	-
31	90	Mario Gosselin	King Autosport	Chevrolet	28.371	126.890	-	-	-	-
32	01	Harrison Rhodes	JD Motorsports	Chevrolet	28.403	126.747	-	-	-	-
33	89	Morgan Shepherd	Shepherd Racing Ventures	Chevrolet	28.494	126.342	-	-	-	-
Qualified by owner's points
34	38	Jeff Green	RSS Racing	Chevrolet	28.521	126.223	-	-	-	-
35	93	Gray Gaulding	RSS Racing	Chevrolet	28.646	125.672	-	-	-	-
36	40	Timmy Hill	MBM Motorsports	Chevrolet	28.725	125.326	-	-	-	-
37	8	Caesar Bacarella	B. J. McLeod Motorsports	Chevrolet	28.732	125.296	-	-	-	-
38	78	John Graham	B. J. McLeod Motorsports	Chevrolet	29.399	122.453	-	-	-	-
39	74	Mike Harmon	Mike Harmon Racing	Dodge	29.757	120.980	-	-	-	-
40	13	Carl Long	MBM Motorsports	Toyota	-	-	-	-	-	-
Official qualifying results
Official starting lineup

== Race results ==
Stage 1 Laps: 60

Pos.	#	Driver	Team	Make	Pts
1	22	Ryan Blaney (i)	Team Penske	Ford	0
2	42	Alex Bowman (i)	Chip Ganassi Racing	Chevrolet	0
3	20	Erik Jones (i)	Joe Gibbs Racing	Toyota	0
4	21	Daniel Hemric (R)	Richard Childress Racing	Chevrolet	7
5	7	Justin Allgaier	JR Motorsports	Chevrolet	6
6	9	William Byron (R)	JR Motorsports	Chevrolet	5
7	00	Cole Custer (R)	Stewart–Haas Racing	Ford	4
8	18	Christopher Bell (i)	Joe Gibbs Racing	Toyota	0
9	2	Austin Dillon (i)	Richard Childress Racing	Chevrolet	0
10	11	Blake Koch	Kaulig Racing	Chevrolet	1

Stage 2 Laps: 60

Pos.	#	Driver	Team	Make	Pts
1	22	Ryan Blaney (i)	Team Penske	Ford	0
2	20	Erik Jones (i)	Joe Gibbs Racing	Toyota	0
3	21	Daniel Hemric (R)	Richard Childress Racing	Chevrolet	8
4	7	Justin Allgaier	JR Motorsports	Chevrolet	7
5	18	Christopher Bell (i)	Joe Gibbs Racing	Toyota	0
6	9	William Byron (R)	JR Motorsports	Chevrolet	5
7	00	Cole Custer (R)	Stewart–Haas Racing	Ford	4
8	2	Austin Dillon (i)	Richard Childress Racing	Chevrolet	0
9	11	Blake Koch	Kaulig Racing	Chevrolet	2
10	3	Ty Dillon (i)	Richard Childress Racing	Chevrolet	0

Stage 3 Laps: 80

Pos	No.	Driver	Team	Make	Laps	Led	Status	Pts
1	9	William Byron (R)	JR Motorsports	Chevrolet	200	17	running	50
2	22	Ryan Blaney (i)	Team Penske	Ford	200	147	running	0
3	20	Erik Jones (i)	Joe Gibbs Racing	Toyota	200	36	running	0
4	18	Christopher Bell (i)	Joe Gibbs Racing	Toyota	200	0	running	0
5	21	Daniel Hemric (R)	Richard Childress Racing	Chevrolet	200	0	running	47
6	11	Blake Koch	Kaulig Racing	Chevrolet	200	0	running	34
7	00	Cole Custer (R)	Stewart–Haas Racing	Ford	200	0	running	38
8	42	Alex Bowman (i)	Chip Ganassi Racing	Chevrolet	200	0	running	0
9	2	Austin Dillon (i)	Richard Childress Racing	Chevrolet	200	0	running	0
10	7	Justin Allgaier	JR Motorsports	Chevrolet	200	0	running	40
11	19	Matt Tifft (R)	Joe Gibbs Racing	Toyota	200	0	running	26
12	98	Casey Mears	Biagi-DenBeste Racing	Ford	200	0	running	25
13	3	Ty Dillon (i)	Richard Childress Racing	Chevrolet	200	0	running	0
14	16	Ryan Reed	Roush Fenway Racing	Ford	200	0	running	23
15	33	Brandon Jones	Richard Childress Racing	Chevrolet	200	0	running	22
16	5	Michael Annett	JR Motorsports	Chevrolet	200	0	running	21
17	23	Spencer Gallagher (R)	GMS Racing	Chevrolet	200	0	running	20
18	1	Elliott Sadler	JR Motorsports	Chevrolet	200	0	running	19
19	4	Ross Chastain	JD Motorsports	Chevrolet	200	0	running	18
20	14	J. J. Yeley	TriStar Motorsports	Toyota	200	0	running	17
21	39	Ryan Sieg	RSS Racing	Chevrolet	200	0	running	16
22	24	Corey LaJoie (i)	JGL Racing	Toyota	199	0	running	0
23	51	Jeremy Clements	Jeremy Clements Racing	Chevrolet	199	0	running	14
24	07	Ray Black Jr.	SS-Green Light Racing	Chevrolet	199	0	running	13
25	0	Garrett Smithley	JD Motorsports	Chevrolet	197	0	running	12
26	90	Mario Gosselin	King Autosport	Chevrolet	197	0	running	11
27	01	Harrison Rhodes	JD Motorsports	Chevrolet	195	0	running	10
28	40	Timmy Hill	MBM Motorsports	Chevrolet	194	0	running	9
29	99	David Starr	BJMM with SS-Green Light Racing	Chevrolet	190	0	running	8
30	8	Caesar Bacarella	B. J. McLeod Motorsports	Chevrolet	190	0	running	7
31	78	John Graham	B. J. McLeod Motorsports	Chevrolet	188	0	running	6
32	62	Brendan Gaughan	Richard Childress Racing	Chevrolet	179	0	crash	5
33	52	Joey Gase	Jimmy Means Racing	Chevrolet	169	0	running	4
34	89	Morgan Shepherd	Shepherd Racing Ventures	Chevrolet	47	0	brakes	3
35	15	Joe Nemechek (i)	JD Motorsports	Chevrolet	44	0	brakes	0
36	13	Carl Long	MBM Motorsports	Toyota	37	0	electrical	1
37	38	Jeff Green	RSS Racing	Chevrolet	30	0	brakes	1
38	48	Brennan Poole	Chip Ganassi Racing	Chevrolet	24	0	crash	1
39	74	Mike Harmon	Mike Harmon Racing	Dodge	19	0	engine	1
40	93	Gray Gaulding	RSS Racing	Chevrolet	6	0	electrical	0
Official race results

== Standings after the race ==
Drivers' Championship standings

	Pos	Driver	Points
1	1	William Byron	4,000
1	2	Justin Allgaier	4,000 (-0)
2	3	Elliott Sadler	4,000 (-0)
3	4	Daniel Hemric	4,000 (–204)
1	5	Cole Custer	2,228 (–1,772)
1	6	Matt Tifft	2,191 (-1,809)
3	7	Brennan Poole	2,188 (-1,812)
2	8	Ryan Reed	2,144 (-1,856)
	9	Brendan Gaughan	2,129 (-1,871)
	10	Michael Annett	2,127 (-1,883)
	11	Blake Koch	2,117 (-1,893)
	12	Jeremy Clements	2,093 (-1,907)
Official driver's standings

- Note: Only the first 12 positions are included for the driver standings.

Previous race: 2017 O'Reilly Auto Parts 300	NASCAR Xfinity Series; 2017 season	Next race: 2017 Ford EcoBoost 300
