= 2024 United Rentals 250 =

28th race of the 2024 NASCAR Xfinity Series

Race details
- Race 28 of 33 in the 2024 NASCAR Xfinity Series
- Date: October 5, 2024
- Location: Talladega Superspeedway in Lincoln, Alabama
- Course: Permanent racing facility
- Course length: 2.66 miles (4.28 km)
- Distance: 98 laps, 260 mi (418 km)
- Scheduled distance: 94 laps, 250 mi (402 km)
- Average speed: 124.927 mph (201.051 km/h)

Pole position
Driver	Jesse Love	Richard Childress Racing
- Time: 52.578

Most laps led
Driver	Jesse Love	Richard Childress Racing
- Laps: 28

Winner
No. 8	Sammy Smith	JR Motorsports

Television in the United States
- Network: The CW (produced by NBC Sports)
- Announcers: Rick Allen, Jeff Burton, and Steve Letarte.

Radio in the United States
- Radio: MRN

The 2024 United Rentals 250 was the 28th stock car race of the 2024 NASCAR Xfinity Series, the second race of the Round of 12, and the 4th iteration of the event. The race was held on Saturday, October 5, 2024, at Talladega Superspeedway in Lincoln, Alabama, a 2.66-mile (4.28 km) permanent quad-oval shaped superspeedway. The race was originally scheduled to be contested over 94 laps, but was increased to 98 laps due to an overtime finish. Sammy Smith, driving for JR Motorsports, would survive numerous late-race incidents, and held off a charging field on the final restart to earn his second career NASCAR Xfinity Series win, and his first of the season. Smith would also claim a spot in the next round of the playoffs. Pole-sitter Jesse Love led a race-high 28 laps, and after getting involved in a late incident, he rebounded to finish sixth. To fill out the podium, Ryan Sieg, driving for RSS Racing, and Riley Herbst, driving for Stewart–Haas Racing, would finish 2nd and 3rd, respectively.

== Report ==
=== Background ===
Talladega Superspeedway, the circuit where the race was held.

Talladega Superspeedway, formerly known as Alabama International Motor Speedway, is a motorsports complex located north of Talladega, Alabama. It is located on the former Anniston Air Force Base in the small city of Lincoln. A tri-oval, the track was constructed in 1969 by the International Speedway Corporation, a business controlled by the France family. Talladega is most known for its steep banking. The track currently hosts NASCAR's Cup Series, Xfinity Series and Craftsman Truck Series. Talladega is the longest NASCAR oval with a length of 2.66-mile-long (4.28 km) tri-oval like the Daytona International Speedway, which is 2.5-mile-long (4.0 km).

==== Entry list ====
- (R) denotes rookie driver.
- (i) denotes driver who is ineligible for series driver points.
- (P) denotes playoff driver.
- (OP) denotes owner's playoff car.

#	Driver	Team	Make
00	Cole Custer (P)	Stewart–Haas Racing	Ford
1	Sam Mayer (P)	JR Motorsports	Chevrolet
2	Jesse Love (R) (P)	Richard Childress Racing	Chevrolet
5	Anthony Alfredo	Our Motorsports	Chevrolet
07	C. J. McLaughlin	SS-Green Light Racing	Chevrolet
7	Justin Allgaier (P)	JR Motorsports	Chevrolet
8	Sammy Smith (P)	JR Motorsports	Chevrolet
9	Brandon Jones	JR Motorsports	Chevrolet
11	Josh Williams	Kaulig Racing	Chevrolet
14	David Starr	SS-Green Light Racing	Chevrolet
15	Dylan Lupton	AM Racing	Ford
16	A. J. Allmendinger (P)	Kaulig Racing	Chevrolet
18	Sheldon Creed (P)	Joe Gibbs Racing	Toyota
19	Taylor Gray (i)	Joe Gibbs Racing	Toyota
20	Aric Almirola (OP)	Joe Gibbs Racing	Toyota
21	Austin Hill (P)	Richard Childress Racing	Chevrolet
26	Dean Thompson (i)	Sam Hunt Racing	Toyota
27	Jeb Burton	Jordan Anderson Racing	Chevrolet
28	Kyle Sieg	RSS Racing	Ford
29	Blaine Perkins	RSS Racing	Ford
31	Parker Retzlaff	Jordan Anderson Racing	Chevrolet
32	Jordan Anderson	Jordan Anderson Racing	Chevrolet
35	Joey Gase	Joey Gase Motorsports	Chevrolet
38	Matt DiBenedetto	RSS Racing	Ford
39	Ryan Sieg	RSS Racing	Ford
42	Leland Honeyman (R)	Young's Motorsports	Chevrolet
43	Ryan Ellis	Alpha Prime Racing	Chevrolet
44	Brennan Poole	Alpha Prime Racing	Chevrolet
45	Caesar Bacarella (Note: Due to Caesar Bacarella feeling under the weather following qualifying, Tommy Joe Martins would replace Bacaralla in the race.)	Alpha Prime Racing	Chevrolet
48	Parker Kligerman (P)	Big Machine Racing	Chevrolet
51	Jeremy Clements	Jeremy Clements Racing	Chevrolet
53	Carson Ware	Joey Gase Motorsports	Ford
81	Chandler Smith (P)	Joe Gibbs Racing	Toyota
88	Carson Kvapil	JR Motorsports	Chevrolet
91	Kyle Weatherman	DGM Racing	Chevrolet
92	Nick Leitz	DGM Racing	Chevrolet
97	Shane van Gisbergen (R) (P)	Kaulig Racing	Chevrolet
98	Riley Herbst (P)	Stewart–Haas Racing	Ford
Official entry list

== Qualifying ==
Qualifying was held on Saturday, October 5, at 11:00 PM CST. Since Talladega Superspeedway is a superspeedway, the qualifying system used is a single-car, one-lap system with two rounds. In the first round, drivers will be on track by themselves and will have one lap to set a time to determine positions 11-38. The fastest ten drivers from the first round move on to the second round to determine positions 1-10. Whoever sets the fastest time in Round 2 will win the pole.

Jesse Love, driving for Richard Childress Racing, would win the pole after advancing from the preliminary round and setting the fastest time in Round 2, with a lap of 52.578, and a speed of 182.129 mph (293.108 km/h).

No drivers would fail to qualify, except the #74 Mike Harmon Racing team, which withdrew from the race before qualifying session started.

=== Qualifying results ===
Pos.	#	Driver	Team	Make	Time (R1)	Speed (R1)	Time (R2)	Speed (R2)
1	2	Jesse Love (R) (P)	Richard Childress Racing	Chevrolet	52.714	181.660	52.578	182.129
2	21	Austin Hill (P)	Richard Childress Racing	Chevrolet	52.837	181.237	52.682	181.770
3	81	Chandler Smith (P)	Joe Gibbs Racing	Toyota	52.744	181.556	52.715	181.656
4	18	Sheldon Creed (P)	Joe Gibbs Racing	Toyota	52.903	181.011	52.794	181.384
5	16	A. J. Allmendinger (P)	Kaulig Racing	Chevrolet	52.906	181.000	52.825	181.278
6	48	Parker Kligerman (P)	Big Machine Racing	Chevrolet	53.156	180.149	52.969	180.785
7	98	Riley Herbst (P)	Stewart–Haas Racing	Ford	53.116	180.285	53.018	180.618
8	97	Shane van Gisbergen (R) (P)	Kaulig Racing	Chevrolet	53.138	180.210	53.037	180.553
9	20	Aric Almirola (OP)	Joe Gibbs Racing	Toyota	53.100	180.339	53.059	180.478
10	00	Cole Custer (P)	Stewart–Haas Racing	Ford	53.149	180.173	53.108	180.312
Eliminated in Round 1
11	19	Taylor Gray (i)	Joe Gibbs Racing	Toyota	53.200	180.000	—	—
12	1	Sam Mayer (P)	JR Motorsports	Chevrolet	53.215	179.949	—	—
13	5	Anthony Alfredo	Our Motorsports	Chevrolet	53.272	179.757	—	—
14	7	Justin Allgaier (P)	JR Motorsports	Chevrolet	53.295	179.679	—	—
15	39	Ryan Sieg	RSS Racing	Ford	53.325	179.578	—	—
16	27	Jeb Burton	Jordan Anderson Racing	Chevrolet	53.374	179.413	—	—
17	11	Josh Williams	Kaulig Racing	Chevrolet	53.460	179.125	—	—
18	88	Carson Kvapil	JR Motorsports	Chevrolet	53.473	179.081	—	—
19	42	Leland Honeyman (R)	Young's Motorsports	Chevrolet	53.485	179.041	—	—
20	9	Brandon Jones	JR Motorsports	Chevrolet	53.495	179.007	—	—
21	07	C. J. McLaughlin	SS-Green Light Racing	Chevrolet	53.509	178.961	—	—
22	26	Dean Thompson (i)	Sam Hunt Racing	Toyota	53.517	178.934	—	—
23	14	David Starr	SS-Green Light Racing	Chevrolet	53.572	178.750	—	—
24	31	Parker Retzlaff	Jordan Anderson Racing	Chevrolet	53.629	178.560	—	—
25	92	Nick Leitz	DGM Racing	Chevrolet	53.633	178.547	—	—
26	32	Jordan Anderson	Jordan Anderson Racing	Chevrolet	53.663	178.447	—	—
27	8	Sammy Smith (P)	JR Motorsports	Chevrolet	53.667	178.434	—	—
28	51	Jeremy Clements	Jeremy Clements Racing	Chevrolet	53.675	178.407	—	—
29	35	Joey Gase	Joey Gase Motorsports	Chevrolet	53.704	178.311	—	—
30	44	Brennan Poole	Alpha Prime Racing	Chevrolet	53.705	178.307	—	—
31	29	Blaine Perkins	RSS Racing	Ford	53.709	178.294	—	—
32	43	Ryan Ellis	Alpha Prime Racing	Chevrolet	53.751	178.155	—	—
33	38	Matt DiBenedetto	RSS Racing	Ford	53.785	178.042	—	—
Qualified by owner's points
34	28	Kyle Sieg	RSS Racing	Ford	53.811	177.956	—	—
35	91	Kyle Weatherman	DGM Racing	Chevrolet	53.880	177.728	—	—
36	15	Dylan Lupton	AM Racing	Ford	54.193	176.702	—	—
37	53	Carson Ware	Joey Gase Motorsports	Ford	54.480	175.771	—	—
38	45	Caesar Bacarella	Alpha Prime Racing	Chevrolet	—	—	—	—
Official qualifying results
Official starting lineup

== Race results ==
Stage 1 Laps: 20

Pos.	#	Driver	Team	Make	Pts
1	81	Chandler Smith (P)	Joe Gibbs Racing	Toyota	10
2	16	A. J. Allmendinger (P)	Kaulig Racing	Chevrolet	9
3	7	Justin Allgaier (P)	JR Motorsports	Chevrolet	8
4	21	Austin Hill (P)	Richard Childress Racing	Chevrolet	7
5	18	Sheldon Creed (P)	Joe Gibbs Racing	Toyota	6
6	5	Anthony Alfredo	Our Motorsports	Chevrolet	5
7	19	Taylor Gray (i)	Joe Gibbs Racing	Toyota	0
8	00	Cole Custer (P)	Stewart–Haas Racing	Ford	3
9	26	Dean Thompson (i)	Sam Hunt Racing	Toyota	0
10	8	Sammy Smith (P)	JR Motorsports	Chevrolet	1

Stage 2 Laps: 20

Pos.	#	Driver	Team	Make	Pts
1	21	Austin Hill (P)	Richard Childress Racing	Chevrolet	10
2	8	Sammy Smith (P)	JR Motorsports	Chevrolet	9
3	2	Jesse Love (R) (P)	Richard Childress Racing	Chevrolet	8
4	97	Shane van Gisbergen (R) (P)	Kaulig Racing	Chevrolet	7
5	81	Chandler Smith (P)	Joe Gibbs Racing	Toyota	6
6	98	Riley Herbst (P)	Stewart–Haas Racing	Ford	5
7	16	A. J. Allmendinger (P)	Kaulig Racing	Chevrolet	4
8	18	Sheldon Creed (P)	Joe Gibbs Racing	Toyota	3
9	00	Cole Custer (P)	Stewart–Haas Racing	Ford	2
10	9	Brandon Jones	JR Motorsports	Chevrolet	1

Stage 3 Laps: 58

Pos.	St	#	Driver	Team	Make	Laps	Led	Status	Pts
1	27	8	Sammy Smith (P)	JR Motorsports	Chevrolet	98	5	Running	49
2	15	39	Ryan Sieg	RSS Racing	Ford	98	1	Running	35
3	7	98	Riley Herbst (P)	Stewart–Haas Racing	Ford	98	22	Running	39
4	4	18	Sheldon Creed (P)	Joe Gibbs Racing	Toyota	98	0	Running	42
5	3	81	Chandler Smith (P)	Joe Gibbs Racing	Toyota	98	11	Running	48
6	1	2	Jesse Love (R) (P)	Richard Childress Racing	Chevrolet	98	28	Running	39
7	16	27	Jeb Burton	Jordan Anderson Racing	Chevrolet	98	0	Running	30
8	23	14	David Starr	SS-Green Light Racing	Chevrolet	98	1	Running	29
9	30	44	Brennan Poole	Alpha Prime Racing	Chevrolet	98	0	Running	28
10	34	28	Kyle Sieg	RSS Racing	Ford	98	0	Running	27
11	5	16	A. J. Allmendinger (P)	Kaulig Racing	Chevrolet	98	13	Running	39
12	6	48	Parker Kligerman (P)	Big Machine Racing	Chevrolet	98	0	Running	25
13	38	45	Tommy Joe Martins	Alpha Prime Racing	Chevrolet	98	0	Running	24
14	19	42	Leland Honeyman (R)	Young's Motorsports	Chevrolet	98	0	Running	23
15	32	43	Ryan Ellis	Alpha Prime Racing	Chevrolet	98	0	Running	22
16	33	38	Matt DiBenedetto	RSS Racing	Ford	98	0	Running	20
17	21	07	C. J. McLaughlin	SS-Green Light Racing	Chevrolet	98	0	Running	19
18	31	29	Blaine Perkins	RSS Racing	Ford	98	1	Running	18
19	9	20	Aric Almirola (OP)	Joe Gibbs Racing	Toyota	98	0	Running	17
20	22	26	Dean Thompson (i)	Sam Hunt Racing	Toyota	98	0	Running	0
21	29	35	Joey Gase	Joey Gase Motorsports	Chevrolet	98	0	Running	15
22	37	53	Carson Ware	Joey Gase Motorsports	Ford	98	0	Running	14
23	2	21	Austin Hill (P)	Richard Childress Racing	Chevrolet	98	7	Running	30
24	36	15	Dylan Lupton	AM Racing	Ford	97	0	Running	12
25	14	7	Justin Allgaier (P)	JR Motorsports	Chevrolet	97	8	Running	19
26	10	00	Cole Custer (P)	Stewart–Haas Racing	Ford	97	0	Running	14
27	18	88	Carson Kvapil	JR Motorsports	Chevrolet	91	0	Accident	9
28	20	9	Brandon Jones	JR Motorsports	Chevrolet	91	0	Accident	9
29	13	5	Anthony Alfredo	Our Motorsports	Chevrolet	91	0	Accident	12
30	24	31	Parker Retzlaff	Jordan Anderson Racing	Chevrolet	91	0	Accident	6
31	35	91	Kyle Weatherman	DGM Racing	Chevrolet	87	0	Running	5
32	11	19	Taylor Gray (i)	Joe Gibbs Racing	Toyota	75	0	Accident	0
33	26	32	Jordan Anderson	Jordan Anderson Racing	Chevrolet	75	0	Accident	3
34	17	11	Josh Williams	Kaulig Racing	Chevrolet	75	0	Accident	2
35	8	97	Shane van Gisbergen (R) (P)	Kaulig Racing	Chevrolet	75	0	Accident	8
36	28	51	Jeremy Clements	Jeremy Clements Racing	Chevrolet	60	0	Brakes	1
37	25	92	Nick Leitz	DGM Racing	Chevrolet	41	0	Accident	1
DSQ	12	1	Sam Mayer (P) (Note: Mayer originally finished 16th, but was later disqualified as it was determined that the rear of his car did not meet minimum height requirements.)	JR Motorsports	Chevrolet	98	1	Running	1
Official race results

== Standings after the race ==
Drivers' Championship standings

	Pos	Driver	Points
1	1	Chandler Smith	2,122
1	2	Austin Hill	2,094 (-28)
2	3	Cole Custer	2,093 (–29)
1	4	Sheldon Creed	2,090 (–32)
2	5	Jesse Love	2,080 (–42)
2	6	Riley Herbst	2,078 (–44)
3	7	Sam Mayer	2,075 (–47)
4	8	Sammy Smith	2,065 (–57)
1	9	A. J. Allmendinger	2,065 (–57)
1	10	Justin Allgaier	2,057 (–65)
5	11	Shane van Gisbergen	2,054 (–68)
1	12	Parker Kligerman	2,049 (–73)
Official driver's standings

Manufacturers' Championship standings

Pos	Manufacturer	Points
1	Chevrolet	1,038
2	Toyota	999 (-39)
3	Ford	905 (–133)

- Note: Only the first 12 positions are included for the driver standings.

Previous race: 2024 Kansas Lottery 300	NASCAR Xfinity Series; 2024 season	Next race: 2024 Drive for the Cure 250
