= 2017 Ford EcoBoost 300 =

33rd race of the 2017 NASCAR Xfinity Series

Race details
- Race 33 of 33 in the 2017 NASCAR Xfinity Series
- Date: November 18, 2017
- Official name: 23rd Annual Ford EcoBoost 300
- Location: Homestead, Florida, Homestead–Miami Speedway
- Course: Permanent racing facility
- Course length: 1.5 miles (2.41 km)
- Distance: 200 laps, 300 mi (482.803 km)
- Scheduled distance: 200 laps, 300 mi (482.803 km)
- Average speed: 136.14 miles per hour (219.10 km/h)

Pole position
Driver	Tyler Reddick	Chip Ganassi Racing
- Time: 32.604

Most laps led
Driver	Cole Custer	Stewart–Haas Racing
- Laps: 182

Winner
No. 00	Cole Custer	Stewart–Haas Racing

Television in the United States
- Network: NBC
- Announcers: Rick Allen, Jeff Burton, Steve Letarte

Radio in the United States
- Radio: Motor Racing Network

The 2017 Ford EcoBoost 300 was the 33rd and final stock car race of the 2017 NASCAR Xfinity Series season, the Championship 4 race, and the 23rd iteration of the event. The race was held on Saturday, November 18, 2017, in Homestead, Florida at Homestead–Miami Speedway, a 1.5 miles (2.4 km) permanent oval-shaped racetrack. The race took the scheduled 200 laps to complete. At race's end, Cole Custer, driving for Stewart–Haas Racing, would dominate the race to take his first career NASCAR Xfinity Series victory and his only victory of the season.

Meanwhile, third-place finisher, JR Motorsports driver William Byron would win his only NASCAR Xfinity Series championship after battling with teammate Elliott Sadler, passing Sadler with nine to go using the car of Ryan Preece to pass Sadler for the championship.

== Background ==
=== Championship drivers ===
- Justin Allgaier advanced by virtue of points.
- William Byron advanced by winning the 2017 Ticket Galaxy 200.
- Daniel Hemric advanced by virtue of points.
- Elliott Sadler advanced by virtue of points.

=== Entry list ===
#	Driver	Team	Make
0	Garrett Smithley	JD Motorsports	Chevrolet
00	Cole Custer (R)	Stewart–Haas Racing	Ford
1	Elliott Sadler	JR Motorsports	Chevrolet
01	Joe Nemechek (i)	JD Motorsports	Chevrolet
2	Ben Kennedy (R)	Richard Childress Racing	Chevrolet
3	Scott Lagasse Jr.	Richard Childress Racing	Chevrolet
4	Ross Chastain	JD Motorsports	Chevrolet
5	Michael Annett	JR Motorsports	Chevrolet
7	Justin Allgaier	JR Motorsports	Chevrolet
07	Ray Black Jr.	SS-Green Light Racing	Chevrolet
8	Caesar Bacarella	B. J. McLeod Motorsports	Chevrolet
9	William Byron (R)	JR Motorsports	Chevrolet
11	Blake Koch	Kaulig Racing	Chevrolet
13	Timmy Hill	MBM Motorsports	Dodge
14	J. J. Yeley	TriStar Motorsports	Toyota
15	Harrison Rhodes	JD Motorsports	Chevrolet
16	Ryan Reed	Roush Fenway Racing	Ford
18	Ryan Preece	Joe Gibbs Racing	Toyota
19	Matt Tifft (R)	Joe Gibbs Racing	Toyota
20	Christopher Bell (i)	Joe Gibbs Racing	Toyota
21	Daniel Hemric (R)	Richard Childress Racing	Chevrolet
22	Sam Hornish Jr.	Team Penske	Ford
23	Spencer Gallagher (R)	GMS Racing	Chevrolet
24	Corey LaJoie (i)	JGL Racing	Toyota
33	Brandon Jones	Richard Childress Racing	Chevrolet
38	Jeff Green	RSS Racing	Chevrolet
39	Stephen Leicht	RSS Racing	Chevrolet
40	Chad Finchum	MBM Motorsports	Toyota
42	Tyler Reddick	Chip Ganassi Racing	Chevrolet
46	Quin Houff	Precision Performance Motorsports	Chevrolet
48	Brennan Poole	Chip Ganassi Racing	Chevrolet
51	Jeremy Clements	Jeremy Clements Racing	Chevrolet
52	Joey Gase	Jimmy Means Racing	Chevrolet
55	Matt Mills	NextGen Motorsports	Toyota
60	Ty Majeski	Roush Fenway Racing	Ford
62	Brendan Gaughan	Richard Childress Racing	Chevrolet
74	John Graham	Mike Harmon Racing	Dodge
78	B. J. McLeod	B. J. McLeod Motorsports	Chevrolet
89	Morgan Shepherd	Shepherd Racing Ventures	Chevrolet
90	Josh Williams	King Autosport	Chevrolet
93	Ryan Sieg	RSS Racing	Chevrolet
98	Casey Mears	Biagi-DenBeste Racing	Ford
99	David Starr	BJMM with SS-Green Light Racing	Chevrolet
Official entry list

== Practice ==
=== First practice ===
The first practice session was held on Friday, November 17, at 2:30 PM EST. The session would last for 55 minutes. Tyler Reddick, driving for Chip Ganassi Racing, would set the fastest time in the session, with a lap of 32.609 and an average speed of 165.598 mph (266.504 km/h).

Pos.	#	Driver	Team	Make	Time	Speed
1	42	Tyler Reddick	Chip Ganassi Racing	Chevrolet	32.609	165.598
2	2	Ben Kennedy (R)	Richard Childress Racing	Chevrolet	32.669	165.294
3	00	Cole Custer (R)	Stewart–Haas Racing	Ford	32.773	164.770
Full first practice results

=== Second and final practice ===
The final practice session, sometimes known as Happy Hour, was held on Friday, November 17, at 5:00 PM EST. The session would last for 55 minutes. William Byron, driving for JR Motorsports, would set the fastest time in the session, with a lap of 32.513 and an average speed of 166.087 mph (267.291 km/h).

Pos.	#	Driver	Team	Make	Time	Speed
1	9	William Byron (R) (CC)	JR Motorsports	Chevrolet	32.513	166.087
2	2	Ben Kennedy (R)	Richard Childress Racing	Chevrolet	32.592	165.685
3	00	Cole Custer (R)	Stewart–Haas Racing	Ford	32.631	165.487
Full Happy Hour practice results

== Qualifying ==
Qualifying was held on Saturday, November 11, at 11:15 AM EST. Since Homestead–Miami Speedway is under 2 miles (3.2 km) in length, the qualifying system was a multi-car system that included three rounds. The first round was 15 minutes, where every driver would be able to set a lap within the 15 minutes. Then, the second round would consist of the fastest 24 cars in Round 1, and drivers would have 10 minutes to set a lap. Round 3 consisted of the fastest 12 drivers from Round 2, and the drivers would have 5 minutes to set a time. Whoever was fastest in Round 3 would win the pole.

Tyler Reddick, driving for Chip Ganassi Racing, would win the pole after setting a time of 32.604 and an average speed of 165.624 mph (266.546 km/h) in the third round.

Three drivers would fail to qualify: Quin Houff, Matt Mills, and Morgan Shepherd.

=== Full qualifying results ===
Pos.	#	Driver	Team	Make	Time (R1)	Speed (R1)	Time (R2)	Speed (R2)	Time (R3)	Speed (R3)
1	42	Tyler Reddick	Chip Ganassi Racing	Chevrolet	32.864	164.314	32.486	166.225	32.604	165.624
2	00	Cole Custer (R)	Stewart–Haas Racing	Ford	32.885	164.209	32.707	165.102	32.745	164.911
3	20	Christopher Bell (i)	Joe Gibbs Racing	Toyota	32.798	164.644	32.824	164.514	32.810	164.584
4	21	Daniel Hemric (R) (CC)	Richard Childress Racing	Chevrolet	33.020	163.537	32.838	164.444	32.820	164.534
5	18	Ryan Preece	Joe Gibbs Racing	Toyota	33.184	162.729	32.908	164.094	32.839	164.439
6	9	William Byron (R) (CC)	JR Motorsports	Chevrolet	33.289	162.216	32.967	163.800	32.986	163.706
7	48	Brennan Poole	Chip Ganassi Racing	Chevrolet	33.197	162.665	32.751	164.880	32.996	163.656
8	22	Sam Hornish Jr.	Team Penske	Ford	32.989	163.691	33.070	163.290	32.998	163.646
9	60	Ty Majeski	Roush Fenway Racing	Ford	32.855	164.359	32.876	164.254	33.096	163.162
10	19	Matt Tifft (R)	Joe Gibbs Racing	Toyota	33.261	162.352	32.933	163.969	33.143	162.930
11	11	Blake Koch	Kaulig Racing	Chevrolet	33.353	161.904	33.027	163.503	33.188	162.709
12	98	Casey Mears	Biagi-DenBeste Racing	Ford	33.495	161.218	33.048	163.399	33.263	162.343
Eliminated in Round 2
13	3	Scott Lagasse Jr.	Richard Childress Racing	Chevrolet	33.198	162.660	33.071	163.285	-	-
14	1	Elliott Sadler (CC)	JR Motorsports	Chevrolet	33.234	162.484	33.122	163.034	-	-
15	16	Ryan Reed	Roush Fenway Racing	Ford	33.479	161.295	33.242	162.445	-	-
16	7	Justin Allgaier (CC)	JR Motorsports	Chevrolet	33.350	161.919	33.272	162.299	-	-
17	24	Corey LaJoie	JGL Racing	Toyota	33.273	162.294	33.319	162.070	-	-
18	5	Michael Annett	JR Motorsports	Chevrolet	33.217	162.567	33.332	162.006	-	-
19	4	Ross Chastain	JD Motorsports	Chevrolet	33.101	163.137	33.382	161.764	-	-
20	33	Brandon Jones	Richard Childress Racing	Chevrolet	33.423	161.565	33.531	161.045	-	-
21	14	J. J. Yeley	TriStar Motorsports	Toyota	33.457	161.401	33.629	160.576	-	-
22	01	Joe Nemechek (i)	JD Motorsports	Chevrolet	33.425	161.556	33.714	160.171	-	-
23	62	Brendan Gaughan	Richard Childress Racing	Chevrolet	33.449	161.440	33.723	160.128	-	-
24	93	Ryan Sieg	RSS Racing	Chevrolet	33.456	161.406	-	-	-	-
Eliminated in Round 1
25	2	Ben Kennedy (R)	Richard Childress Racing	Chevrolet	33.509	161.151	-	-	-	-
26	0	Garrett Smithley	JD Motorsports	Chevrolet	33.540	161.002	-	-	-	-
27	07	Ray Black Jr.	SS-Green Light Racing	Chevrolet	33.572	160.848	-	-	-	-
28	23	Spencer Gallagher (R)	GMS Racing	Chevrolet	33.582	160.800	-	-	-	-
29	51	Jeremy Clements	Jeremy Clements Racing	Chevrolet	33.650	160.475	-	-	-	-
30	8	Caesar Bacarella	B. J. McLeod Motorsports	Chevrolet	33.841	159.570	-	-	-	-
31	15	Harrison Rhodes	JD Motorsports	Chevrolet	33.885	159.363	-	-	-	-
32	52	Joey Gase	Jimmy Means Racing	Chevrolet	34.017	158.744	-	-	-	-
33	90	Josh Williams	King Autosport	Chevrolet	34.023	158.716	-	-	-	-
Qualified by owner's points
34	13	Timmy Hill	MBM Motorsports	Dodge	34.049	158.595	-	-	-	-
35	78	B. J. McLeod	B. J. McLeod Motorsports	Chevrolet	34.067	158.511	-	-	-	-
36	40	Chad Finchum	MBM Motorsports	Toyota	34.298	157.444	-	-	-	-
37	39	Stephen Leicht	RSS Racing	Chevrolet	34.402	156.968	-	-	-	-
38	99	David Starr	BJMM with SS-Green Light Racing	Chevrolet	34.622	155.970	-	-	-	-
39	74	John Graham	Mike Harmon Racing	Dodge	36.100	149.584	-	-	-	-
40	38	Jeff Green	RSS Racing	Chevrolet	36.229	149.052	-	-	-	-
Failed to qualify
41	46	Quin Houff	Precision Performance Motorsports	Chevrolet	34.170	158.033	-	-	-	-
42	55	Matt Mills	NextGen Motorsports	Toyota	34.184	157.969	-	-	-	-
43	89	Morgan Shepherd	Shepherd Racing Ventures	Chevrolet	34.504	156.504	-	-	-	-
Official qualifying results
Official starting lineup

== Race results ==
- Note: Justin Allgaier, William Byron, Daniel Hemric, and Elliott Sadler are not eligible for stage points because of their participation in the Championship 4.

Stage 1 Laps: 45

Pos.	#	Driver	Team	Make	Pts
1	00	Cole Custer (R)	Stewart–Haas Racing	Ford	10
2	42	Tyler Reddick	Chip Ganassi Racing	Chevrolet	9
3	23	Spencer Gallagher (R)	GMS Racing	Chevrolet	8
4	3	Scott Lagasse Jr.	Richard Childress Racing	Chevrolet	7
5	18	Ryan Preece	Joe Gibbs Racing	Toyota	6
6	60	Ty Majeski	Roush Fenway Racing	Ford	5
7	21	Daniel Hemric (R) (CC)	Richard Childress Racing	Chevrolet	0
8	1	Elliott Sadler (CC)	JR Motorsports	Chevrolet	0
9	14	J. J. Yeley	TriStar Motorsports	Toyota	2
10	01	Joe Nemechek (i)	JD Motorsports	Chevrolet	0

Stage 2 Laps: 45

Pos.	#	Driver	Team	Make	Pts
1	00	Cole Custer (R)	Stewart–Haas Racing	Ford	10
2	22	Sam Hornish Jr.	Team Penske	Ford	9
3	42	Tyler Reddick	Chip Ganassi Racing	Chevrolet	8
4	18	Ryan Preece	Joe Gibbs Racing	Toyota	7
5	9	William Byron (R) (CC)	JR Motorsports	Chevrolet	0
6	1	Elliott Sadler (CC)	JR Motorsports	Chevrolet	0
7	48	Brennan Poole	Chip Ganassi Racing	Chevrolet	4
8	60	Ty Majeski	Roush Fenway Racing	Ford	3
9	7	Justin Allgaier (CC)	JR Motorsports	Chevrolet	0
10	24	Corey LaJoie	JGL Racing	Toyota	1

Stage 3 Laps: 110

Pos	No.	Driver	Team	Make	Laps	Led	Status	Pts
1	00	Cole Custer (R)	Stewart–Haas Racing	Ford	200	182	running	60
2	22	Sam Hornish Jr.	Team Penske	Ford	200	0	running	44
3	9	William Byron (R) (CC)	JR Motorsports	Chevrolet	200	0	running	34
4	42	Tyler Reddick	Chip Ganassi Racing	Chevrolet	200	18	running	50
5	18	Ryan Preece	Joe Gibbs Racing	Toyota	200	0	running	45
6	48	Brennan Poole	Chip Ganassi Racing	Chevrolet	200	0	running	35
7	19	Matt Tifft (R)	Joe Gibbs Racing	Toyota	200	0	running	30
8	1	Elliott Sadler (CC)	JR Motorsports	Chevrolet	200	0	running	29
9	5	Michael Annett	JR Motorsports	Chevrolet	199	0	running	28
10	60	Ty Majeski	Roush Fenway Racing	Ford	199	0	running	35
11	98	Casey Mears	Biagi-DenBeste Racing	Ford	199	0	running	26
12	7	Justin Allgaier (CC)	JR Motorsports	Chevrolet	199	0	running	25
13	62	Brendan Gaughan	Richard Childress Racing	Chevrolet	199	0	running	24
14	33	Brandon Jones	Richard Childress Racing	Chevrolet	199	0	running	23
15	24	Corey LaJoie	JGL Racing	Toyota	199	0	running	23
16	11	Blake Koch	Kaulig Racing	Chevrolet	199	0	running	21
17	4	Ross Chastain	JD Motorsports	Chevrolet	198	0	running	20
18	2	Ben Kennedy (R)	Richard Childress Racing	Chevrolet	198	0	running	19
19	23	Spencer Gallagher (R)	GMS Racing	Chevrolet	198	0	running	26
20	16	Ryan Reed	Roush Fenway Racing	Ford	198	0	running	17
21	3	Scott Lagasse Jr.	Richard Childress Racing	Chevrolet	198	0	running	23
22	14	J. J. Yeley	TriStar Motorsports	Toyota	198	0	running	17
23	51	Jeremy Clements	Jeremy Clements Racing	Chevrolet	197	0	running	14
24	0	Garrett Smithley	JD Motorsports	Chevrolet	196	0	running	13
25	07	Ray Black Jr.	SS-Green Light Racing	Chevrolet	196	0	running	12
26	93	Ryan Sieg	RSS Racing	Chevrolet	196	0	running	11
27	01	Joe Nemechek (i)	JD Motorsports	Chevrolet	196	0	running	0
28	90	Josh Williams	King Autosport	Chevrolet	196	0	running	9
29	52	Joey Gase	Jimmy Means Racing	Chevrolet	195	0	running	8
30	40	Chad Finchum	MBM Motorsports	Toyota	194	0	running	7
31	8	Caesar Bacarella	B. J. McLeod Motorsports	Chevrolet	193	0	running	6
32	99	David Starr	BJMM with SS-Green Light Racing	Chevrolet	192	0	running	5
33	78	B. J. McLeod	B. J. McLeod Motorsports	Chevrolet	191	0	running	4
34	21	Daniel Hemric (R) (CC)	Richard Childress Racing	Chevrolet	187	0	running	3
35	39	Stephen Leicht	RSS Racing	Chevrolet	102	0	brakes	2
36	20	Christopher Bell (i)	Joe Gibbs Racing	Toyota	78	0	engine	0
37	13	Timmy Hill	MBM Motorsports	Dodge	54	0	vibration	1
38	74	John Graham	Mike Harmon Racing	Dodge	31	0	parked	1
39	15	Harrison Rhodes	JD Motorsports	Chevrolet	19	0	electrical	1
40	38	Jeff Green	RSS Racing	Chevrolet	10	0	clutch	1
Official race results

== Standings after the race ==
Drivers' Championship standings

	Pos	Driver	Points
	1	William Byron	4,034
1	2	Elliott Sadler	4,029 (-5)
1	3	Justin Allgaier	4,025 (-9)
	4	Daniel Hemric	4,003 (–31)
	5	Cole Custer	2,288 (–1,746)
1	6	Brennan Poole	2,223 (-1,811)
1	7	Matt Tifft	2,211 (-1,823)
	8	Ryan Reed	2,161 (-1,873)
1	9	Michael Annett	2,155 (-1,879)
1	10	Brendan Gaughan	2,153 (-1,881)
	11	Blake Koch	2,138 (-1,896)
	12	Jeremy Clements	2,107 (-1,927)
Official driver's standings

- Note: Only the first 12 positions are included for the driver standings.

Previous race: 2017 Ticket Galaxy 200	NASCAR Xfinity Series; 2017 season	Next race: 2018 PowerShares QQQ 300
