= 2020 Wawa 250 =

2020 Wawa 250 Powered by Coca-Cola
Race details
- Race 22 of 33 of the 2020 NASCAR Xfinity Series
- Date: August 28, 2020
- Official name: Wawa 250 Powered by Coca-Cola
- Location: Daytona Beach, Florida, Daytona International Speedway
- Course: Permanent racing facility
- Course length: 2.5 miles (4.0 km)
- Distance: 100 laps, 250 mi (402.336 km)
- Scheduled distance: 100 laps, 250 mi (402.336 km)
- Average speed: 122.034 miles per hour (196.395 km/h)

Pole position
Driver	Chase Briscoe	Stewart-Haas Racing
- Grid positions set by competition-based formula

Most laps led
Driver	A. J. Allmendinger	Kaulig Racing
- Laps: 58

Winner
No. 11	Justin Haley	Kaulig Racing

Television in the United States
- Network: NBCSN
- Announcers: Rick Allen, Jeff Burton, Dale Earnhardt Jr.

Radio in the United States
- Radio: Motor Racing Network

The 2020 Wawa 250 Powered by Coca-Cola was the 22nd stock car race of the 2020 NASCAR Xfinity Series season and the 19th iteration of the event. The race was held on Friday, August 28, 2020 in Daytona Beach, Florida at Daytona International Speedway, a 2.5 miles (4.0 km) permanent triangular-shaped superspeedway. The race took the scheduled 100 laps to complete. After a wild ending that saw the leaders wreck in the middle of Turn 3-4, Justin Haley of Kaulig Racing would survive the last lap wreck and hold off Gray Gaulding to win the race, the 2nd NASCAR Xfinity Series win of his career and the 2nd of the season. To fill the podium, Gray Gaulding of SS-Green Light Racing and Chase Briscoe of Stewart-Haas Racing would finish 2nd and third, respectively.

== Background ==
Daytona International Speedway is one of three superspeedways to hold NASCAR races, the other two being Indianapolis Motor Speedway and Talladega Superspeedway. The standard track at Daytona International Speedway is a four-turn superspeedway that is 2.5 miles (4.0 km) long. The track's turns are banked at 31 degrees, while the front stretch, the location of the finish line, is banked at 18 degrees.

=== Entry list ===
#	Driver	Team	Make	Sponsor
0	Jeffrey Earnhardt	JD Motorsports	Chevrolet	Drydene
1	Michael Annett	JR Motorsports	Chevrolet	TMC Transportation
02	Brett Moffitt	Our Motorsports	Chevrolet	Destiny Homes
4	Jesse Little	JD Motorsports	Chevrolet	SkuttleTight
5	Matt Mills	B. J. McLeod Motorsports	Toyota	J. F. Electric
6	B. J. McLeod	JD Motorsports	Chevrolet	Florida Sheriffs Youth Ranches "Put A Star On Your Car"
7	Justin Allgaier	JR Motorsports	Chevrolet	Suave
07	Gray Gaulding	SS-Green Light Racing	Chevrolet	Walk-On's Sports Bistreaux
8	Daniel Hemric	JR Motorsports	Chevrolet	Poppy Bank
08	Joe Graf Jr.	SS-Green Light Racing	Chevrolet	Bucked Up Energy Woke AF
9	Noah Gragson	JR Motorsports	Chevrolet	Bass Pro Shops, Black Rifle Coffee Company
10	Ross Chastain	Kaulig Racing	Chevrolet	Nutrien Ag Solutions
11	Justin Haley	Kaulig Racing	Chevrolet	LeafFilter Gutter Protection
13	Chad Finchum	MBM Motorsports	Toyota	RoofClaim.com
15	Colby Howard	JD Motorsports	Chevrolet	Project Hope Foundation
16	A. J. Allmendinger	Kaulig Racing	Chevrolet	Ellsworth Advisors
18	Riley Herbst	Joe Gibbs Racing	Toyota	Monster Energy
19	Brandon Jones	Joe Gibbs Racing	Toyota	Menards, Pelonis
20	Harrison Burton	Joe Gibbs Racing	Toyota	DEX Imaging
21	Anthony Alfredo	Richard Childress Racing	Chevrolet	Pyro Putty
22	Austin Cindric	Team Penske	Ford	Odyssey Battery
36	Alex Labbé	DGM Racing	Chevrolet	La Rue Industrial Snowblowers, Les Excavations C. A. T. Inc.
39	Ryan Sieg	RSS Racing	Chevrolet	CMR Construction & Roofing
44	Tommy Joe Martins	Martins Motorsports	Chevrolet	AAN Adjusters
47	Tim Viens	Mike Harmon Racing	Chevrolet	Mike Harmon Racing
51	Jeremy Clements	Jeremy Clements Racing	Chevrolet	Repairables.com
52	Kody Vanderwal	Jimmy Means Racing	Chevrolet	The Swag Spot
61	Timmy Hill	Hattori Racing Enterprises	Toyota	RoofClaim.com
66	John Jackson	MBM Motorsports	Toyota	James Carter Attorney at Law
68	Brandon Brown	Brandonbilt Motorsports	Chevrolet	Larry's Hard Lemonade
74	Mike Harmon	Mike Harmon Racing	Chevrolet	Thin Blue Line USA "#BackTheBlue"
78	Vinnie Miller	B. J. McLeod Motorsports	Toyota	Koolbox ICE
90	Caesar Bacarella	DGM Racing	Chevrolet	Maxim, Alpha Prime Regimen
92	Josh Williams	DGM Racing	Chevrolet	Alloy Employer Services "Stronger by design"
93	Myatt Snider	RSS Racing	Chevrolet	Superior Essex
98	Chase Briscoe	Stewart-Haas Racing	Ford	Ford Performance Racing School
99	Joey Gase	B. J. McLeod Motorsports	Toyota	Eternal Fan, EFX Corp.
Official entry list

== Starting lineup ==
The starting lineup was determined by a metric qualifying system based on the results and fastest lap of the second race of the 2020 Drydene 200 weekend, and owner's points. As a result, Chase Briscoe of Stewart-Haas Racing won the pole.

Pos.	#	Driver	Team	Make
1	98	Chase Briscoe	Stewart-Haas Racing	Ford
2	10	Ross Chastain	Kaulig Racing	Chevrolet
3	22	Austin Cindric	Team Penske	Ford
4	9	Noah Gragson	JR Motorsports	Chevrolet
5	7	Justin Allgaier	JR Motorsports	Chevrolet
6	19	Brandon Jones	Joe Gibbs Racing	Toyota
7	8	Daniel Hemric	JR Motorsports	Chevrolet
8	1	Michael Annett	JR Motorsports	Chevrolet
9	11	Justin Haley	Kaulig Racing	Chevrolet
10	18	Riley Herbst	Joe Gibbs Racing	Toyota
11	20	Harrison Burton	Joe Gibbs Racing	Toyota
12	02	Brett Moffitt	Our Motorsports	Chevrolet
13	21	Anthony Alfredo	Richard Childress Racing	Chevrolet
14	39	Ryan Sieg	RSS Racing	Chevrolet
15	68	Brandon Brown	Brandonbilt Motorsports	Chevrolet
16	51	Jeremy Clements	Jeremy Clements Racing	Chevrolet
17	36	Alex Labbé	DGM Racing	Chevrolet
18	44	Tommy Joe Martins	Martins Motorsports	Chevrolet
19	93	Myatt Snider	RSS Racing	Chevrolet
20	92	Josh Williams	DGM Racing	Chevrolet
21	4	Jesse Little	JD Motorsports	Chevrolet
22	08	Joe Graf Jr.	SS-Green Light Racing	Chevrolet
23	6	B. J. McLeod	JD Motorsports	Chevrolet
24	0	Jeffrey Earnhardt	JD Motorsports	Chevrolet
25	13	Chad Finchum	MBM Motorsports	Toyota
26	15	Colby Howard	JD Motorsports	Chevrolet
27	52	Kody Vanderwal	Jimmy Means Racing	Chevrolet
28	07	Gray Gaulding	SS-Green Light Racing	Chevrolet
29	5	Matt Mills	B. J. McLeod Motorsports	Toyota
30	78	Vinnie Miller	B. J. McLeod Motorsports	Toyota
31	61	Timmy Hill	Hattori Racing Enterprises	Toyota
32	90	Caesar Bacarella	DGM Racing	Chevrolet
33	99	Joey Gase	B. J. McLeod Motorsports	Toyota
34	16	A. J. Allmendinger	Kaulig Racing	Chevrolet
35	74	Mike Harmon	Mike Harmon Racing	Chevrolet
36	47	Tim Viens	Mike Harmon Racing	Chevrolet
37	66	John Jackson	MBM Motorsports	Toyota
Official starting lineup

== Race results ==
Stage 1 Laps: 30

Fin	#	Driver	Team	Make	Pts
1	11	Justin Haley	Kaulig Racing	Chevrolet	10
2	10	Ross Chastain	Kaulig Racing	Chevrolet	9
3	22	Austin Cindric	Team Penske	Ford	8
4	68	Brandon Brown	Brandonbilt Motorsports	Chevrolet	7
5	98	Chase Briscoe	Stewart-Haas Racing	Ford	6
6	18	Riley Herbst	Joe Gibbs Racing	Toyota	5
7	9	Noah Gragson	JR Motorsports	Chevrolet	4
8	7	Justin Allgaier	JR Motorsports	Chevrolet	3
9	19	Brandon Jones	Joe Gibbs Racing	Toyota	2
10	8	Daniel Hemric	JR Motorsports	Chevrolet	1

Stage 2 Laps: 30

Fin	#	Driver	Team	Make	Pts
1	16	A. J. Allmendinger	Kaulig Racing	Chevrolet	10
2	10	Ross Chastain	Kaulig Racing	Chevrolet	9
3	11	Justin Haley	Kaulig Racing	Chevrolet	8
4	07	Gray Gaulding	SS-Green Light Racing	Chevrolet	0
5	1	Michael Annett	JR Motorsports	Chevrolet	6
6	18	Riley Herbst	Joe Gibbs Racing	Toyota	5
7	20	Harrison Burton	Joe Gibbs Racing	Toyota	4
8	98	Chase Briscoe	Stewart-Haas Racing	Ford	3
9	22	Austin Cindric	Team Penske	Ford	2
10	39	Ryan Sieg	RSS Racing	Chevrolet	1

Stage 3 Laps: 40

Fin	St	#	Driver	Team	Make	Laps	Led	Status	Pts
1	9	11	Justin Haley	Kaulig Racing	Chevrolet	100	9	running	58
2	28	07	Gray Gaulding	SS-Green Light Racing	Chevrolet	100	2	running	0
3	1	98	Chase Briscoe	Stewart-Haas Racing	Ford	100	22	running	43
4	10	18	Riley Herbst	Joe Gibbs Racing	Toyota	100	4	running	33
5	11	20	Harrison Burton	Joe Gibbs Racing	Toyota	100	0	running	36
6	2	10	Ross Chastain	Kaulig Racing	Chevrolet	100	1	running	49
7	8	1	Michael Annett	JR Motorsports	Chevrolet	100	0	running	36
8	3	22	Austin Cindric	Team Penske	Ford	100	0	running	39
9	20	92	Josh Williams	DGM Racing	Chevrolet	100	0	running	28
10	21	4	Jesse Little	JD Motorsports	Chevrolet	100	0	running	27
11	30	78	Vinnie Miller	B. J. McLeod Motorsports	Toyota	100	0	running	26
12	26	15	Colby Howard	JD Motorsports	Chevrolet	100	0	running	25
13	6	19	Brandon Jones	Joe Gibbs Racing	Toyota	100	0	running	26
14	18	44	Tommy Joe Martins	Martins Motorsports	Chevrolet	100	0	running	23
15	34	16	A. J. Allmendinger	Kaulig Racing	Chevrolet	99	58	crash	32
16	29	5	Matt Mills	B. J. McLeod Motorsports	Toyota	99	0	running	21
17	35	74	Mike Harmon	Mike Harmon Racing	Chevrolet	99	0	running	20
18	36	47	Tim Viens	Mike Harmon Racing	Chevrolet	99	0	running	0
19	19	93	Myatt Snider	RSS Racing	Chevrolet	99	0	running	18
20	16	51	Jeremy Clements	Jeremy Clements Racing	Chevrolet	98	0	running	17
21	13	21	Anthony Alfredo	Richard Childress Racing	Chevrolet	98	0	running	16
22	31	61	Timmy Hill	Hattori Racing Enterprises	Toyota	97	4	running	0
23	14	39	Ryan Sieg	RSS Racing	Chevrolet	96	0	running	15
24	7	8	Daniel Hemric	JR Motorsports	Chevrolet	92	0	running	14
25	25	13	Chad Finchum	MBM Motorsports	Toyota	88	0	engine	12
26	15	68	Brandon Brown	Brandonbilt Motorsports	Chevrolet	48	0	dvp	18
27	12	02	Brett Moffitt	Our Motorsports	Chevrolet	47	0	crash	0
28	33	99	Joey Gase	B. J. McLeod Motorsports	Toyota	46	0	dvp	9
29	5	7	Justin Allgaier	JR Motorsports	Chevrolet	46	0	crash	11
30	17	36	Alex Labbé	DGM Racing	Chevrolet	45	0	crash	7
31	4	9	Noah Gragson	JR Motorsports	Chevrolet	40	0	crash	10
32	23	6	B. J. McLeod	JD Motorsports	Chevrolet	36	0	crash	5
33	24	0	Jeffrey Earnhardt	JD Motorsports	Chevrolet	24	0	crash	4
34	27	52	Kody Vanderwal	Jimmy Means Racing	Chevrolet	24	0	crash	3
35	37	66	John Jackson	MBM Motorsports	Toyota	14	0	handling	2
36	32	90	Caesar Bacarella	DGM Racing	Chevrolet	12	0	crash	1
37	22	08	Joe Graf Jr.	SS-Green Light Racing	Chevrolet	7	0	crash	1
Official race results

Previous race: 2020 Drydene 200 (Sunday)	NASCAR Xfinity Series; 2020 season	Next race: 2020 Sport Clips Haircuts VFW 200
