= 2023 Wawa 250 =

24th race of the 2023 NASCAR Xfinity Series

2023 Wawa 250 Powered by Coca-Cola
Race details
- Race 24 of 33 of the 2023 NASCAR Xfinity Series
- Date: August 25, 2023
- Official name: 22nd Annual Wawa 250 Powered by Coca-Cola
- Location: Daytona International Speedway, Daytona Beach, Florida
- Course: Permanent racing facility
- Course length: 2.5 miles (4.0 km)
- Distance: 110 laps, 275 mi (442 km)
- Scheduled distance: 100 laps, 250 mi (400 km)
- Average speed: 124.779 mph (200.812 km/h)

Pole position
Driver	Austin Hill	Richard Childress Racing
- Time: 49.256

Most laps led
Driver	Austin Hill	Richard Childress Racing
- Laps: 36

Winner
No. 7	Justin Allgaier	JR Motorsports

Television in the United States
- Network: USA
- Announcers: Rick Allen and Steve Letarte

Radio in the United States
- Radio: MRN

The 2023 Wawa 250 Powered by Coca-Cola was the 24th stock car race of the 2023 NASCAR Xfinity Series, and the 22nd iteration of the event. The race was held on Friday, August 25, 2023, in Daytona Beach, Florida at Daytona International Speedway, a 2.5 miles (4.0 km) permanent quad-oval shaped superspeedway. The race was originally scheduled to be contested over 100 laps, but was extended to 110 laps due to several NASCAR overtime attempts. In a wild race that saw numerous wrecks with under 10 laps to go, Justin Allgaier, driving for JR Motorsports, would hold off Sheldon Creed in a photo finish to earn his 21st career NASCAR Xfinity Series win, and his second of the season. Allgaier would beat Creed by 0.005 of a second, tying the fourth closest finish in Xfinity Series history. To fill out the podium, Creed, driving for Richard Childress Racing, and Daniel Hemric, driving for Kaulig Racing, would finish 2nd and 3rd, respectively.

== Background ==
The race was held at Daytona International Speedway, a race track located in Daytona Beach, Florida, United States. Since its opening in 1959, the track has been the home of the Daytona 500, the most prestigious race in NASCAR. In addition to NASCAR, the track also hosts ARCA, AMA Superbike, USCC, SCCA, and Motocross races. It features multiple layouts including the primary 2.5 miles (4.0 km) high speed tri-oval, a 3.56 miles (5.73 km) sports car course, a 2.95 miles (4.75 km) motorcycle course, and a .25 miles (0.40 km) karting and motorcycle flat-track. The track's 180-acre (73 ha) infield includes the 29-acre (12 ha) Lake Lloyd, which has hosted powerboat racing. The speedway is owned and operated by International Speedway Corporation.

The track was built in 1959 by NASCAR founder William "Bill" France, Sr. to host racing held at the former Daytona Beach Road Course. His banked design permitted higher speeds and gave fans a better view of the cars. Lights were installed around the track in 1998 and today, it is the third-largest single lit outdoor sports facility. The speedway has been renovated three times, with the infield renovated in 2004 and the track repaved twice — in 1978 and in 2010. On January 22, 2013, the track unveiled artist depictions of a renovated speedway. On July 5 of that year, ground was broken for a project that would remove the backstretch seating and completely redevelop the frontstretch seating. The renovation to the speedway was done by Rossetti Architects. The project, named "Daytona Rising", was completed in January 2016, at a cost of US $400 million, placing emphasis on improving fan experience with five expanded and redesigned fan entrances (called "injectors") as well as wider and more comfortable seating with more restrooms and concession stands. After the renovations, the track's grandstands included 101,000 permanent seats with the ability to increase permanent seating to 125,000. The project was completed before the start of Speedweeks.

=== Entry list ===
- (R) denotes rookie driver.
- (i) denotes driver who is ineligible for series driver points.

#	Driver	Team	Make
00	Cole Custer	Stewart-Haas Racing	Ford
1	Sam Mayer	JR Motorsports	Chevrolet
02	Blaine Perkins (R)	Our Motorsports	Chevrolet
2	Sheldon Creed	Richard Childress Racing	Chevrolet
4	Kyle Weatherman	JD Motorsports	Chevrolet
6	Garrett Smithley	JD Motorsports	Chevrolet
07	J. J. Yeley	SS-Green Light Racing	Chevrolet
7	Justin Allgaier	JR Motorsports	Chevrolet
08	Gray Gaulding	SS-Green Light Racing	Chevrolet
8	Josh Berry	JR Motorsports	Chevrolet
9	Brandon Jones	JR Motorsports	Chevrolet
10	Justin Haley (i)	Kaulig Racing	Chevrolet
11	Daniel Hemric	Kaulig Racing	Chevrolet
16	Chandler Smith (R)	Kaulig Racing	Chevrolet
18	Sammy Smith (R)	Joe Gibbs Racing	Toyota
19	Trevor Bayne	Joe Gibbs Racing	Toyota
20	John Hunter Nemechek	Joe Gibbs Racing	Toyota
21	Austin Hill	Richard Childress Racing	Chevrolet
22	Jeb Burton	Jordan Anderson Racing	Chevrolet
24	Connor Mosack (R)	Sam Hunt Racing	Toyota
25	Brett Moffitt	AM Racing	Ford
26	Kaz Grala	Sam Hunt Racing	Toyota
27	Jordan Anderson	Jordan Anderson Racing	Chevrolet
28	Kyle Sieg	RSS Racing	Ford
31	Parker Retzlaff (R)	Jordan Anderson Racing	Chevrolet
35	Joey Gase	Emerling-Gase Motorsports	Chevrolet
38	Joe Graf Jr.	RSS Racing	Ford
39	Ryan Sieg	RSS Racing	Ford
43	Ryan Ellis	Alpha Prime Racing	Chevrolet
44	Caesar Bacarella	Alpha Prime Racing	Chevrolet
45	Jeffrey Earnhardt	Alpha Prime Racing	Chevrolet
48	Parker Kligerman	Big Machine Racing	Chevrolet
51	Jeremy Clements	Jeremy Clements Racing	Chevrolet
53	Natalie Decker	Emerling-Gase Motorsports	Ford
78	Anthony Alfredo	B. J. McLeod Motorsports	Chevrolet
91	Alex Guenette	DGM Racing	Chevrolet
92	Josh Williams	DGM Racing	Chevrolet
98	Riley Herbst	Stewart-Haas Racing	Ford
Official entry list

== Qualifying ==
Qualifying was held on Friday, August 25, at 3:00 PM EST. Since Daytona International Speedway is a superspeedway, the qualifying system used is a single-car, single-lap system with two rounds. In the first round, drivers have one lap to set a time. The fastest ten drivers from the first round move on to the second round. Whoever sets the fastest time in Round 2 wins the pole. Austin Hill, driving for Richard Childress Racing, would score the pole for the race after advancing from the preliminary round and setting the fastest time in Round 2, with a lap of 49.256, and an average speed of 182.719 mph (294.058 km/h).

Pos.	#	Driver	Team	Make	Time (R1)	Speed (R1)	Time (R2)	Speed (R2)
1	21	Austin Hill	Richard Childress Racing	Chevrolet	49.371	182.293	49.256	182.719
2	2	Sheldon Creed	Richard Childress Racing	Chevrolet	49.589	181.492	49.554	181.620
3	18	Sammy Smith (R)	Joe Gibbs Racing	Toyota	49.626	181.357	49.584	181.510
4	16	Chandler Smith (R)	Kaulig Racing	Chevrolet	49.568	181.569	49.630	181.342
5	48	Parker Kligerman	Big Machine Racing	Chevrolet	49.687	181.134	49.663	181.221
6	11	Daniel Hemric	Kaulig Racing	Chevrolet	49.721	181.010	49.683	181.148
7	20	John Hunter Nemechek	Joe Gibbs Racing	Toyota	49.793	180.748	49.712	181.043
8	19	Trevor Bayne	Joe Gibbs Racing	Toyota	49.753	180.894	49.734	180.963
9	10	Justin Haley (i)	Kaulig Racing	Chevrolet	49.767	180.843	49.735	180.959
10	22	Jeb Burton	Jordan Anderson Racing	Chevrolet	49.782	180.788	49.850	180.542
Eliminated in Round 1
11	00	Cole Custer	Stewart-Haas Racing	Ford	49.797	180.734	—	—
12	7	Justin Allgaier	JR Motorsports	Chevrolet	49.851	180.538	—	—
13	8	Josh Berry	JR Motorsports	Chevrolet	49.915	180.307	—	—
14	1	Sam Mayer	JR Motorsports	Chevrolet	49.928	180.260	—	—
15	35	Joey Gase	Emerling-Gase Motorsports	Chevrolet	49.951	180.177	—	—
16	98	Riley Herbst	Stewart-Haas Racing	Ford	49.977	180.083	—	—
17	9	Brandon Jones	JR Motorsports	Chevrolet	49.985	180.054	—	—
18	26	Kaz Grala	Sam Hunt Racing	Toyota	50.016	179.942	—	—
19	4	Kyle Weatherman	JD Motorsports	Chevrolet	50.114	179.591	—	—
20	78	Anthony Alfredo	B. J. McLeod Motorsports	Chevrolet	50.149	179.465	—	—
21	92	Josh Williams	DGM Racing	Chevrolet	50.194	179.304	—	—
22	25	Brett Moffitt	AM Racing	Ford	50.235	179.158	—	—
23	31	Parker Retzlaff (R)	Jordan Anderson Racing	Chevrolet	50.262	179.062	—	—
24	28	Kyle Sieg	RSS Racing	Ford	50.269	179.037	—	—
25	02	Blaine Perkins (R)	Our Motorsports	Chevrolet	50.277	179.008	—	—
26	38	Joe Graf Jr.	RSS Racing	Ford	50.311	178.887	—	—
27	45	Jeffrey Earnhardt	Alpha Prime Racing	Chevrolet	50.338	178.791	—	—
28	43	Ryan Ellis	Alpha Prime Racing	Chevrolet	50.389	178.610	—	—
29	24	Connor Mosack (R)	Sam Hunt Racing	Toyota	50.412	178.529	—	—
30	44	Caesar Bacarella	Alpha Prime Racing	Chevrolet	50.511	178.179	—	—
31	91	Alex Guenette	DGM Racing	Chevrolet	50.569	177.975	—	—
32	51	Jeremy Clements	Jeremy Clements Racing	Chevrolet	50.596	177.880	—	—
33	08	Gray Gaulding	SS-Green Light Racing	Chevrolet	50.598	177.873	—	—
Qualified by owner's points
34	07	J. J. Yeley	SS-Green Light Racing	Chevrolet	50.690	177.550	—	—
35	53	Natalie Decker	Emerling-Gase Motorsports	Ford	50.692	177.543	—	—
36	6	Garrett Smithley	JD Motorsports	Chevrolet	51.059	176.267	—	—
37	27	Jordan Anderson	Jordan Anderson Racing	Chevrolet	—	—	—	—
38	39	Ryan Sieg	RSS Racing	Ford	—	—	—	—
Official qualifying results
Official starting lineup

== Race results ==
Stage 1 Laps: 30

Pos.	#	Driver	Team	Make	Pts
1	21	Austin Hill	Richard Childress Racing	Chevrolet	10
2	2	Sheldon Creed	Richard Childress Racing	Chevrolet	9
3	16	Chandler Smith (R)	Kaulig Racing	Chevrolet	8
4	25	Brett Moffitt	AM Racing	Ford	7
5	78	Anthony Alfredo	B. J. McLeod Motorsports	Chevrolet	6
6	9	Brandon Jones	JR Motorsports	Chevrolet	5
7	11	Daniel Hemric	Kaulig Racing	Chevrolet	4
8	51	Jeremy Clements	Jeremy Clements Racing	Chevrolet	3
9	00	Cole Custer	Stewart-Haas Racing	Ford	2
10	19	Trevor Bayne	Joe Gibbs Racing	Toyota	1

Stage 2 Laps: 30

Pos.	#	Driver	Team	Make	Pts
1	2	Sheldon Creed	Richard Childress Racing	Chevrolet	10
2	21	Austin Hill	Richard Childress Racing	Chevrolet	9
3	00	Cole Custer	Stewart-Haas Racing	Ford	8
4	18	Sammy Smith (R)	Joe Gibbs Racing	Toyota	7
5	11	Daniel Hemric	Kaulig Racing	Chevrolet	6
6	20	John Hunter Nemechek	Joe Gibbs Racing	Toyota	5
7	19	Trevor Bayne	Joe Gibbs Racing	Toyota	4
8	48	Parker Kligerman	Big Machine Racing	Chevrolet	3
9	1	Sam Mayer	JR Motorsports	Chevrolet	2
10	16	Chandler Smith (R)	Kaulig Racing	Chevrolet	1

Stage 3 Laps: 50

Pos.	St	#	Driver	Team	Make	Laps	Led	Status	Pts
1	12	7	Justin Allgaier	JR Motorsports	Chevrolet	110	14	Running	40
2	2	2	Sheldon Creed	Richard Childress Racing	Chevrolet	110	21	Running	54
3	6	11	Daniel Hemric	Kaulig Racing	Chevrolet	110	0	Running	44
4	5	48	Parker Kligerman	Big Machine Racing	Chevrolet	110	1	Running	36
5	11	00	Cole Custer	Stewart-Haas Racing	Ford	110	1	Running	42
6	38	39	Ryan Sieg	RSS Racing	Ford	110	0	Running	31
7	23	31	Parker Retzlaff (R)	Jordan Anderson Racing	Chevrolet	110	0	Running	30
8	20	78	Anthony Alfredo	B. J. McLeod Motorsports	Chevrolet	110	0	Running	35
9	33	08	Gray Gaulding	SS-Green Light Racing	Chevrolet	110	0	Running	28
10	9	10	Justin Haley (i)	Kaulig Racing	Chevrolet	110	0	Running	0
11	27	45	Jeffrey Earnhardt	Alpha Prime Racing	Chevrolet	110	0	Running	26
12	10	22	Jeb Burton	Jordan Anderson Racing	Chevrolet	110	0	Running	25
13	24	28	Kyle Sieg	RSS Racing	Ford	110	0	Running	24
14	15	35	Joey Gase	Emerling-Gase Motorsports	Chevrolet	110	0	Running	23
15	37	27	Jordan Anderson	Jordan Anderson Racing	Chevrolet	110	0	Running	22
16	36	6	Garrett Smithley	JD Motorsports	Chevrolet	110	0	Running	21
17	13	8	Josh Berry	JR Motorsports	Chevrolet	110	0	Running	20
18	22	25	Brett Moffitt	AM Racing	Ford	110	0	Running	26
19	14	1	Sam Mayer	JR Motorsports	Chevrolet	110	6	Running	20
20	18	26	Kaz Grala	Sam Hunt Racing	Toyota	109	0	Running	17
21	3	18	Sammy Smith (R)	Joe Gibbs Racing	Toyota	109	4	Running	23
22	4	16	Chandler Smith (R)	Kaulig Racing	Chevrolet	109	1	Running	24
23	1	21	Austin Hill	Richard Childress Racing	Chevrolet	109	36	Running	33
24	16	98	Riley Herbst	Stewart-Haas Racing	Ford	108	0	Running	13
25	25	02	Blaine Perkins (R)	Our Motorsports	Chevrolet	108	0	Running	12
26	32	51	Jeremy Clements	Jeremy Clements Racing	Chevrolet	104	0	Accident	14
27	21	92	Josh Williams	DGM Racing	Chevrolet	103	0	Accident	10
28	7	20	John Hunter Nemechek	Joe Gibbs Racing	Toyota	103	0	Accident	14
29	8	19	Trevor Bayne	Joe Gibbs Racing	Toyota	103	26	Accident	13
30	34	07	J. J. Yeley	SS-Green Light Racing	Chevrolet	98	0	Accident	7
31	30	44	Caesar Bacarella	Alpha Prime Racing	Chevrolet	92	0	Accident	6
32	28	43	Ryan Ellis	Alpha Prime Racing	Chevrolet	91	0	Accident	5
33	19	4	Kyle Weatherman	JD Motorsports	Chevrolet	45	0	DVP	4
34	26	38	Joe Graf Jr.	RSS Racing	Ford	42	0	DVP	3
35	35	53	Natalie Decker	Emerling-Gase Motorsports	Ford	42	0	Accident	2
36	17	9	Brandon Jones	JR Motorsports	Chevrolet	41	0	Accident	6
37	29	24	Connor Mosack (R)	Sam Hunt Racing	Toyota	41	0	Accident	1
38	31	91	Alex Guenette	DGM Racing	Chevrolet	41	0	Accident	1
Official race results

== Standings after the race ==
Drivers' Championship standings

	Pos	Driver	Points
	1	Austin Hill	919
1	2	Justin Allgaier	892 (-27)
1	3	John Hunter Nemechek	891 (–28)
	4	Cole Custer	817 (–102)
	5	Sam Mayer	755 (–164)
	6	Josh Berry	733 (–186)
2	7	Sheldon Creed	683 (–236)
	8	Daniel Hemric	679 (–240)
2	9	Chandler Smith	675 (–244)
1	10	Parker Kligerman	643 (–276)
1	11	Riley Herbst	623 (–296)
	12	Sammy Smith	609 (–310)
Official driver's standings

- Note: Only the first 12 positions are included for the driver standings.

Previous race: 2023 Shriners Children's 200 at The Glen	NASCAR Xfinity Series; 2023 season	Next race: 2023 Sport Clips Haircuts VFW 200
