= 2020 Drydene 200 (Sunday) =

2020 Drydene 200 Race 2
Race details
- Race 21 of 33 of the 2020 NASCAR Xfinity Series
- Date: August 23, 2020
- Official name: Drydene 200 Race 2
- Location: Dover, Delaware, Dover International Speedway
- Course: Permanent racing facility
- Course length: 1 miles (1.6 km)
- Distance: 200 laps, 200 mi (321.868 km)
- Scheduled distance: 200 laps, 200 mi (321.868 km)
- Average speed: 111.784 miles per hour (179.899 km/h)

Pole position
Driver	Brett Moffitt	Our Motorsports

Most laps led
Driver	Chase Briscoe	Stewart-Haas Racing
- Laps: 107

Winner
No. 98	Chase Briscoe	Stewart-Haas Racing

Television in the United States
- Network: NBCSN
- Announcers: Steve Letarte, Jeff Burton, Dale Earnhardt Jr., Dale Jarrett

Radio in the United States
- Radio: Motor Racing Network

The second race of the 2020 Drydene 200 doubleheader was the 21st stock car race of the 2020 NASCAR Xfinity Series season and the 35th iteration of the event. The race was originally going to be held on August 22, 2020, but was delayed by a day due to the COVID-19 pandemic. The race was held on Sunday, August 23, 2020, in Dover, Delaware at Dover International Speedway, a 1-mile (1.6 km) permanent oval-shaped racetrack. The race took the scheduled 200 laps to complete. At race's end, Chase Briscoe of Stewart-Haas Racing would come to dominate and win the race, the 8th NASCAR Xfinity Series win of his career and the 6th of the season. To fill out the podium, Ross Chastain of Kaulig Racing and Austin Cindric of Team Penske would finish 2nd and 3rd, respectively.

== Background ==
Dover International Speedway is an oval race track in Dover, Delaware, United States that has held at least two NASCAR races since it opened in 1969. In addition to NASCAR, the track also hosted USAC and the NTT IndyCar Series. The track features one layout, a 1-mile (1.6 km) concrete oval, with 24° banking in the turns and 9° banking on the straights. The speedway is owned and operated by Dover Motorsports.

The track, nicknamed "The Monster Mile", was built in 1969 by Melvin Joseph of Melvin L. Joseph Construction Company, Inc., with an asphalt surface, but was replaced with concrete in 1995. Six years later in 2001, the track's capacity moved to 135,000 seats, making the track have the largest capacity of sports venue in the mid-Atlantic. In 2002, the name changed to Dover International Speedway from Dover Downs International Speedway after Dover Downs Gaming and Entertainment split, making Dover Motorsports. From 2007 to 2009, the speedway worked on an improvement project called "The Monster Makeover", which expanded facilities at the track and beautified the track. After the 2014 season, the track's capacity was reduced to 95,500 seats.

=== Entry list ===
#	Driver	Team	Make	Sponsor
0	Jeffrey Earnhardt	JD Motorsports	Chevrolet	Drydene
1	Michael Annett	JR Motorsports	Chevrolet	Pilot Flying J
02	Brett Moffitt	Our Motorsports	Chevrolet	Robert B. Our Co.
4	Jesse Little	JD Motorsports	Chevrolet	Drydene
5	Matt Mills	B. J. McLeod Motorsports	Chevrolet	J. F. Electric
6	B. J. McLeod	JD Motorsports	Chevrolet	Drydene
7	Justin Allgaier	JR Motorsports	Chevrolet	National FFA Organization
07	David Starr	SS-Green Light Racing	Chevrolet	Jacob Companies, Alarm Tech Systems
8	Daniel Hemric	JR Motorsports	Chevrolet	Poppy Bank
08	Joe Graf Jr.	SS-Green Light Racing	Chevrolet	Bucked Up Energy
9	Noah Gragson	JR Motorsports	Chevrolet	Bass Pro Shops, Black Rifle Coffee Company
10	Ross Chastain	Kaulig Racing	Chevrolet	Moose Fraternity
11	Justin Haley	Kaulig Racing	Chevrolet	LeafFilter Gutter Protection
13	Chad Finchum	MBM Motorsports	Toyota	Garrison Homes
15	Colby Howard	JD Motorsports	Chevrolet	Project Hope Foundation
18	Riley Herbst	Joe Gibbs Racing	Toyota	Monster Energy
19	Brandon Jones	Joe Gibbs Racing	Toyota	Menards, Pelonis
20	Harrison Burton	Joe Gibbs Racing	Toyota	DEX Imaging
21	Anthony Alfredo	Richard Childress Racing	Chevrolet	Footing First, Advanced Draining Systems
22	Austin Cindric	Team Penske	Ford	PPG Industries
36	Korbin Forrister	DGM Racing	Chevrolet	Nursing Home Caregivers
39	Ryan Sieg	RSS Racing	Chevrolet	CMR Construction & Roofing
44	Tommy Joe Martins	Martins Motorsports	Chevrolet	Gilreath Farms Black Angus "The New Black"
47	Kyle Weatherman	Mike Harmon Racing	Chevrolet	Thin Blue Line USA "#BackTheBlue"
51	Jeremy Clements	Jeremy Clements Racing	Chevrolet	Repairables.com
52	Kody Vanderwal	Jimmy Means Racing	Chevrolet	Circle Track Warehouse
61	Stephen Leicht	Hattori Racing Enterprises	Toyota	Jani-King
66	Timmy Hill	MBM Motorsports	Toyota	Jani-King
68	Brandon Brown	Brandonbilt Motorsports	Chevrolet	JABS Construction
74	Bayley Currey	Mike Harmon Racing	Chevrolet	Mutt & Jeff Porkskins
78	Vinnie Miller	B. J. McLeod Motorsports	Chevrolet	GlassSkinz
90	Alex Labbé	DGM Racing	Chevrolet	Prolon Controls
92	Josh Williams	DGM Racing	Chevrolet	Musselman's
93	Myatt Snider	RSS Racing	Chevrolet	Louisiana Hot Sauce
98	Chase Briscoe	Stewart-Haas Racing	Ford	HighPoint.com
99	Stefan Parsons	B. J. McLeod Motorsports	Toyota	Rich Mar Florist

== Starting lineup ==
The starting lineup was based on a partial inversion of the previous race, the Saturday's running of the Drydene 200. As a result, Brett Moffitt of Our Motorsports would win the pole.

Pos.	#	Driver	Team	Make
1	02	Brett Moffitt	Our Motorsports	Chevrolet
2	68	Brandon Brown	Brandonbilt Motorsports	Chevrolet
3	51	Jeremy Clements	Jeremy Clements Racing	Chevrolet
4	39	Ryan Sieg	RSS Racing	Chevrolet
5	21	Anthony Alfredo	Richard Childress Racing	Chevrolet
6	98	Chase Briscoe	Stewart-Haas Racing	Ford
7	1	Michael Annett	JR Motorsports	Chevrolet
8	11	Justin Haley	Kaulig Racing	Chevrolet
9	8	Daniel Hemric	JR Motorsports	Chevrolet
10	18	Riley Herbst	Joe Gibbs Racing	Toyota
11	20	Harrison Burton	Joe Gibbs Racing	Toyota
12	9	Noah Gragson	JR Motorsports	Chevrolet
13	10	Ross Chastain	Kaulig Racing	Chevrolet
14	22	Austin Cindric	Team Penske	Ford
15	7	Justin Allgaier	JR Motorsports	Chevrolet
16	19	Brandon Jones	Joe Gibbs Racing	Toyota
17	93	Myatt Snider	RSS Racing	Chevrolet
18	90	Alex Labbé	DGM Racing	Chevrolet
19	0	Jeffrey Earnhardt	JD Motorsports	Chevrolet
20	4	Jesse Little	JD Motorsports	Chevrolet
21	08	Joe Graf Jr.	SS-Green Light Racing	Chevrolet
22	92	Josh Williams	DGM Racing	Chevrolet
23	61	Stephen Leicht	Hattori Racing Enterprises	Toyota
24	44	Tommy Joe Martins	Martins Motorsports	Chevrolet
25	07	David Starr	SS-Green Light Racing	Chevrolet
26	47	Kyle Weatherman	Mike Harmon Racing	Chevrolet
27	99	Stefan Parsons	B. J. McLeod Motorsports	Toyota
28	6	B. J. McLeod	JD Motorsports	Chevrolet
29	78	Vinnie Miller	B. J. McLeod Motorsports	Chevrolet
30	36	Korbin Forrister	DGM Racing	Chevrolet
31	15	Colby Howard	JD Motorsports	Chevrolet
32	13	Chad Finchum	MBM Motorsports	Toyota
33	74	Bayley Currey	Mike Harmon Racing	Chevrolet
34	52	Kody Vanderwal	Jimmy Means Racing	Chevrolet
35	5	Matt Mills	B. J. McLeod Motorsports	Chevrolet
36	66	Timmy Hill	MBM Motorsports	Toyota
Official starting lineup

== Race results ==
Stage 1 Laps: 45

Fin	#	Driver	Team	Make	Pts
1	10	Ross Chastain	Kaulig Racing	Chevrolet	10
2	7	Justin Allgaier	JR Motorsports	Chevrolet	9
3	02	Brett Moffitt	Our Motorsports	Chevrolet	0
4	18	Riley Herbst	Joe Gibbs Racing	Toyota	7
5	9	Noah Gragson	JR Motorsports	Chevrolet	6
6	98	Chase Briscoe	Stewart-Haas Racing	Ford	5
7	22	Austin Cindric	Team Penske	Ford	4
8	11	Justin Haley	Kaulig Racing	Chevrolet	3
9	8	Daniel Hemric	JR Motorsports	Chevrolet	2
10	68	Brandon Brown	Brandonbilt Motorsports	Chevrolet	1

Stage 2 Laps: 45

Fin	#	Driver	Team	Make	Pts
1	98	Chase Briscoe	Stewart-Haas Racing	Ford	10
2	7	Justin Allgaier	JR Motorsports	Chevrolet	9
3	10	Ross Chastain	Kaulig Racing	Chevrolet	8
4	22	Austin Cindric	Team Penske	Ford	7
5	9	Noah Gragson	JR Motorsports	Chevrolet	6
6	8	Daniel Hemric	JR Motorsports	Chevrolet	5
7	19	Brandon Jones	Joe Gibbs Racing	Toyota	4
8	02	Brett Moffitt	Our Motorsports	Chevrolet	0
9	20	Harrison Burton	Joe Gibbs Racing	Toyota	2
10	11	Justin Haley	Kaulig Racing	Chevrolet	1

Stage 3 Laps: 110

Fin	St	#	Driver	Team	Make	Laps	Led	Status	Pts
1	6	98	Chase Briscoe	Stewart-Haas Racing	Ford	200	107	running	55
2	13	10	Ross Chastain	Kaulig Racing	Chevrolet	200	24	running	53
3	14	22	Austin Cindric	Team Penske	Ford	200	1	running	45
4	16	19	Brandon Jones	Joe Gibbs Racing	Toyota	200	8	running	37
5	9	8	Daniel Hemric	JR Motorsports	Chevrolet	200	0	running	39
6	12	9	Noah Gragson	JR Motorsports	Chevrolet	200	11	running	43
7	15	7	Justin Allgaier	JR Motorsports	Chevrolet	200	19	running	48
8	7	1	Michael Annett	JR Motorsports	Chevrolet	199	5	running	29
9	10	18	Riley Herbst	Joe Gibbs Racing	Toyota	199	0	running	35
10	1	02	Brett Moffitt	Our Motorsports	Chevrolet	199	25	running	0
11	11	20	Harrison Burton	Joe Gibbs Racing	Toyota	199	0	running	28
12	8	11	Justin Haley	Kaulig Racing	Chevrolet	199	0	running	29
13	5	21	Anthony Alfredo	Richard Childress Racing	Chevrolet	199	0	running	24
14	4	39	Ryan Sieg	RSS Racing	Chevrolet	199	0	running	23
15	24	44	Tommy Joe Martins	Martins Motorsports	Chevrolet	198	0	running	22
16	2	68	Brandon Brown	Brandonbilt Motorsports	Chevrolet	198	0	running	22
17	18	90	Alex Labbé	DGM Racing	Chevrolet	198	0	running	20
18	17	93	Myatt Snider	RSS Racing	Chevrolet	197	0	running	19
19	3	51	Jeremy Clements	Jeremy Clements Racing	Chevrolet	197	0	running	18
20	25	07	David Starr	SS-Green Light Racing	Chevrolet	197	0	running	17
21	21	08	Joe Graf Jr.	SS-Green Light Racing	Chevrolet	197	0	running	16
22	22	92	Josh Williams	DGM Racing	Chevrolet	197	0	running	15
23	20	4	Jesse Little	JD Motorsports	Chevrolet	197	0	running	14
24	32	13	Chad Finchum	MBM Motorsports	Toyota	196	0	running	13
25	28	6	B. J. McLeod	JD Motorsports	Chevrolet	196	0	running	12
26	31	15	Colby Howard	JD Motorsports	Chevrolet	196	0	running	11
27	34	52	Kody Vanderwal	Jimmy Means Racing	Chevrolet	196	0	running	10
28	27	99	Stefan Parsons	B. J. McLeod Motorsports	Toyota	196	0	running	9
29	19	0	Jeffrey Earnhardt	JD Motorsports	Chevrolet	195	0	running	8
30	35	5	Matt Mills	B. J. McLeod Motorsports	Chevrolet	194	0	running	7
31	23	61	Stephen Leicht	Hattori Racing Enterprises	Toyota	192	0	running	6
32	30	36	Korbin Forrister	DGM Racing	Chevrolet	167	0	brakes	0
33	33	74	Bayley Currey	Mike Harmon Racing	Chevrolet	106	0	engine	0
34	36	66	Timmy Hill	MBM Motorsports	Toyota	59	0	overheating	0
35	26	47	Kyle Weatherman	Mike Harmon Racing	Chevrolet	23	0	suspension	2
36	29	78	Vinnie Miller	B. J. McLeod Motorsports	Chevrolet	11	0	crash	1
Official race results

Previous race: 2020 Drydene 200 (Saturday)	NASCAR Xfinity Series; 2020 season	Next race: 2020 Wawa 250
