= 2020 Drydene 200 (Saturday) =

2020 Drydene 200 Race 1
Race details
- Race 20 of 33 of the 2020 NASCAR Xfinity Series
- Date: August 22, 2020
- Official name: Drydene 200 Race 1
- Location: Dover, Delaware, Dover International Speedway
- Course: Permanent racing facility
- Course length: 1 miles (1.6 km)
- Distance: 200 laps, 200 mi (321.868 km)
- Scheduled distance: 200 laps, 200 mi (321.868 km)
- Average speed: 110.142 miles per hour (177.256 km/h)

Pole position
Driver	Austin Cindric	Team Penske
- Grid positions set by competition-based formula

Most laps led
Driver	Justin Allgaier	JR Motorsports
- Laps: 120

Winner
No. 7	Justin Allgaier	JR Motorsports

Television in the United States
- Network: NBCSN
- Announcers: Rick Allen, Dale Earnhardt Jr., Brad Daugherty

Radio in the United States
- Radio: Motor Racing Network

The first of the two 2020 Drydene 200s was the 20th stock car race of the 2020 NASCAR Xfinity Series season, and the 39th iteration of the event. The race was held on Saturday, August 22, 2020 in Dover, Delaware at Dover International Speedway, a 1 mile (1.6 km) permanent oval-shaped racetrack. The race was originally to be held on May 2, but was postponed to August 22 due to the COVID-19 pandemic. The race took the scheduled 200 laps to complete. At race's end, Justin Allgaier of JR Motorsports would win the race in dominating fashion, winning the 12th race of his career in the NASCAR Xfinity Series and the first of the season. To fill the podium, Austin Cindric of Team Penske and Ross Chastain of Kaulig Racing would finish 2nd and 3rd, respectively.

== Background ==
The layout of Dover International Speedway, the venue where the race was held.

Dover International Speedway is an oval race track in Dover, Delaware, United States that has held at least two NASCAR races since it opened in 1969. In addition to NASCAR, the track also hosted USAC and the NTT IndyCar Series. The track features one layout, a 1 mile (1.6 km) concrete oval, with 24° banking in the turns and 9° banking on the straights. The speedway is owned and operated by Dover Motorsports.

The track, nicknamed "The Monster Mile", was built in 1969 by Melvin Joseph of Melvin L. Joseph Construction Company, Inc., with an asphalt surface, but was replaced with concrete in 1995. Six years later in 2001, the track's capacity moved to 135,000 seats, making the track have the largest capacity of sports venue in the mid-Atlantic. In 2002, the name changed to Dover International Speedway from Dover Downs International Speedway after Dover Downs Gaming and Entertainment split, making Dover Motorsports. From 2007 to 2009, the speedway worked on an improvement project called "The Monster Makeover", which expanded facilities at the track and beautified the track. After the 2014 season, the track's capacity was reduced to 95,500 seats.

#	Driver	Team	Make	Sponsor
0	Jeffrey Earnhardt	JD Motorsports	Chevrolet	Drydene
1	Michael Annett	JR Motorsports	Chevrolet	Pilot Flying J
02	Brett Moffitt	Our Motorsports	Chevrolet	Robert B. Our Co.
4	Jesse Little	JD Motorsports	Chevrolet	Drydene
5	Matt Mills	B. J. McLeod Motorsports	Chevrolet	J. F. Electric
6	B. J. McLeod	JD Motorsports	Chevrolet	Drydene
7	Justin Allgaier	JR Motorsports	Chevrolet	National FFA Organization
07	David Starr	SS-Green Light Racing	Chevrolet	Jacob Companies, Alarm Tech Systems
8	Jeb Burton	JR Motorsports	Chevrolet	State Water Heaters
08	Joe Graf Jr.	SS-Green Light Racing	Chevrolet	Bucked Up Energy
9	Noah Gragson	JR Motorsports	Chevrolet	Bass Pro Shops, Black Rifle Coffee Company
10	Ross Chastain	Kaulig Racing	Chevrolet	Moose Fraternity
11	Justin Haley	Kaulig Racing	Chevrolet	LeafFilter Gutter Protection
13	Chad Finchum	MBM Motorsports	Toyota	Garrison Homes
15	Colby Howard	JD Motorsports	Chevrolet	Project Hope Foundation
18	Riley Herbst	Joe Gibbs Racing	Toyota	Monster Energy
19	Brandon Jones	Joe Gibbs Racing	Toyota	Menards, Pelonis
20	Harrison Burton	Joe Gibbs Racing	Toyota	DEX Imaging, FIELDS
21	Anthony Alfredo	Richard Childress Racing	Chevrolet	Footing First, Advanced Draining Systems
22	Austin Cindric	Team Penske	Ford	PPG Industries
36	Korbin Forrister	DGM Racing	Chevrolet	Nursing Home Caregivers
39	Ryan Sieg	RSS Racing	Chevrolet	CMR Construction & Roofing
44	Tommy Joe Martins	Martins Motorsports	Chevrolet	Gilreath Farms Black Angus "The New Black"
47	Kyle Weatherman	Mike Harmon Racing	Chevrolet	Thin Blue Line USA "#BackTheBlue"
51	Jeremy Clements	Jeremy Clements Racing	Chevrolet	Repairables.com
52	Kody Vanderwal	Jimmy Means Racing	Chevrolet	Circle Track Warehouse
61	Stephen Leicht	Hattori Racing Enterprises	Toyota	Jani-King
66	Timmy Hill	MBM Motorsports	Toyota	Jani-King
68	Brandon Brown	Brandonbilt Motorsports	Chevrolet	JABS Construction
74	Bayley Currey	Mike Harmon Racing	Chevrolet	Mutt & Jeff Porkskins
78	Vinnie Miller	B. J. McLeod Motorsports	Chevrolet	GlassSkinz
90	Alex Labbé	DGM Racing	Chevrolet	Prolon Controls
92	Josh Williams	DGM Racing	Chevrolet	Musselman's
93	Myatt Snider	RSS Racing	Chevrolet	Louisiana Hot Sauce
98	Chase Briscoe	Stewart-Haas Racing	Ford	HighPoint.com
99	Stefan Parsons	B. J. McLeod Motorsports	Toyota	Rich Mar Florist
Official entry list

== Starting lineup ==
The starting lineup was based on a metric qualifying system based on the previous race, the 2020 UNOH 188 and owner's points. As a result, Austin Cindric of Team Penske won the pole.

Pos.	#	Driver	Team	Make
1	22	Austin Cindric	Team Penske	Ford
2	9	Noah Gragson	JR Motorsports	Chevrolet
3	19	Brandon Jones	Joe Gibbs Racing	Toyota
4	20	Harrison Burton	Joe Gibbs Racing	Toyota
5	7	Justin Allgaier	JR Motorsports	Chevrolet
6	18	Riley Herbst	Joe Gibbs Racing	Toyota
7	51	Jeremy Clements	Jeremy Clements Racing	Chevrolet
8	1	Michael Annett	JR Motorsports	Chevrolet
9	39	Ryan Sieg	RSS Racing	Chevrolet
10	98	Chase Briscoe	Stewart-Haas Racing	Ford
11	93	Myatt Snider	RSS Racing	Chevrolet
12	4	Jesse Little	JD Motorsports	Chevrolet
13	10	Ross Chastain	Kaulig Racing	Chevrolet
14	44	Tommy Joe Martins	Martins Motorsports	Chevrolet
15	61	Stephen Leicht	Hattori Racing Enterprises	Toyota
16	74	Bayley Currey	Mike Harmon Racing	Chevrolet
17	6	B. J. McLeod	JD Motorsports	Chevrolet
18	92	Josh Williams	DGM Racing	Chevrolet
19	90	Alex Labbé	DGM Racing	Chevrolet
20	47	Kyle Weatherman	Mike Harmon Racing	Chevrolet
21	68	Brandon Brown	Brandonbilt Motorsports	Chevrolet
22	11	Justin Haley	Kaulig Racing	Chevrolet
23	08	Joe Graf Jr.	SS-Green Light Racing	Chevrolet
24	52	Kody Vanderwal	Jimmy Means Racing	Chevrolet
25	5	Matt Mills	B. J. McLeod Motorsports	Chevrolet
26	21	Anthony Alfredo	Richard Childress Racing	Chevrolet
27	8	Jeb Burton	JR Motorsports	Chevrolet
28	02	Brett Moffitt	Our Motorsports	Chevrolet
29	07	David Starr	SS-Green Light Racing	Chevrolet
30	0	Jeffrey Earnhardt	JD Motorsports	Chevrolet
31	36	Korbin Forrister	DGM Racing	Chevrolet
32	99	Stefan Parsons	B. J. McLeod Motorsports	Toyota
33	15	Colby Howard	JD Motorsports	Chevrolet
34	13	Chad Finchum	MBM Motorsports	Toyota
35	78	Vinnie Miller	B. J. McLeod Motorsports	Chevrolet
36	66	Timmy Hill	MBM Motorsports	Toyota
Official starting lineup

== Race results ==
Stage 1 Laps: 45

Fin	#	Driver	Team	Make	Pts
1	22	Austin Cindric	Team Penske	Ford	10
2	9	Noah Gragson	JR Motorsports	Chevrolet	9
3	7	Justin Allgaier	JR Motorsports	Chevrolet	8
4	10	Ross Chastain	Kaulig Racing	Chevrolet	7
5	20	Harrison Burton	Joe Gibbs Racing	Toyota	6
6	18	Riley Herbst	Joe Gibbs Racing	Toyota	5
7	19	Brandon Jones	Joe Gibbs Racing	Toyota	4
8	98	Chase Briscoe	Stewart-Haas Racing	Ford	3
9	1	Michael Annett	JR Motorsports	Chevrolet	2
10	39	Ryan Sieg	RSS Racing	Chevrolet	1

Stage 2 Laps: 45

Fin	#	Driver	Team	Make	Pts
1	7	Justin Allgaier	JR Motorsports	Chevrolet	10
2	22	Austin Cindric	Team Penske	Ford	9
3	10	Ross Chastain	Kaulig Racing	Chevrolet	8
4	9	Noah Gragson	JR Motorsports	Chevrolet	7
5	18	Riley Herbst	Joe Gibbs Racing	Toyota	6
6	20	Harrison Burton	Joe Gibbs Racing	Toyota	5
7	11	Justin Haley	Kaulig Racing	Chevrolet	4
8	19	Brandon Jones	Joe Gibbs Racing	Toyota	3
9	8	Jeb Burton	JR Motorsports	Chevrolet	2
10	1	Michael Annett	JR Motorsports	Chevrolet	1

Stage 3 Laps: 110

Fin	St	#	Driver	Team	Make	Laps	Led	Status	Pts
1	5	7	Justin Allgaier	JR Motorsports	Chevrolet	200	120	running	58
2	1	22	Austin Cindric	Team Penske	Ford	200	49	running	54
3	13	10	Ross Chastain	Kaulig Racing	Chevrolet	200	0	running	49
4	2	9	Noah Gragson	JR Motorsports	Chevrolet	200	27	running	49
5	4	20	Harrison Burton	Joe Gibbs Racing	Toyota	200	0	running	43
6	6	18	Riley Herbst	Joe Gibbs Racing	Toyota	200	0	running	42
7	27	8	Jeb Burton	JR Motorsports	Chevrolet	200	0	running	32
8	22	11	Justin Haley	Kaulig Racing	Chevrolet	200	0	running	33
9	8	1	Michael Annett	JR Motorsports	Chevrolet	200	0	running	31
10	10	98	Chase Briscoe	Stewart-Haas Racing	Ford	200	0	running	30
11	26	21	Anthony Alfredo	Richard Childress Racing	Chevrolet	200	0	running	26
12	9	39	Ryan Sieg	RSS Racing	Chevrolet	200	0	running	26
13	7	51	Jeremy Clements	Jeremy Clements Racing	Chevrolet	200	0	running	24
14	21	68	Brandon Brown	Brandonbilt Motorsports	Chevrolet	200	4	running	23
15	28	02	Brett Moffitt	Our Motorsports	Chevrolet	200	0	running	0
16	3	19	Brandon Jones	Joe Gibbs Racing	Toyota	200	0	running	28
17	11	93	Myatt Snider	RSS Racing	Chevrolet	200	0	running	20
18	23	08	Joe Graf Jr.	SS-Green Light Racing	Chevrolet	199	0	running	19
19	19	90	Alex Labbé	DGM Racing	Chevrolet	199	0	running	18
20	30	0	Jeffrey Earnhardt	JD Motorsports	Chevrolet	198	0	running	17
21	14	44	Tommy Joe Martins	Martins Motorsports	Chevrolet	198	0	running	16
22	15	61	Stephen Leicht	Hattori Racing Enterprises	Toyota	198	0	running	15
23	12	4	Jesse Little	JD Motorsports	Chevrolet	198	0	running	14
24	18	92	Josh Williams	DGM Racing	Chevrolet	198	0	running	13
25	20	47	Kyle Weatherman	Mike Harmon Racing	Chevrolet	198	0	running	12
26	32	99	Stefan Parsons	B. J. McLeod Motorsports	Toyota	198	0	running	11
27	29	07	David Starr	SS-Green Light Racing	Chevrolet	197	0	running	10
28	35	78	Vinnie Miller	B. J. McLeod Motorsports	Chevrolet	196	0	running	9
29	34	13	Chad Finchum	MBM Motorsports	Toyota	196	0	running	8
30	33	15	Colby Howard	JD Motorsports	Chevrolet	195	0	running	7
31	24	52	Kody Vanderwal	Jimmy Means Racing	Chevrolet	194	0	running	6
32	31	36	Korbin Forrister	DGM Racing	Chevrolet	191	0	running	0
33	25	5	Matt Mills	B. J. McLeod Motorsports	Chevrolet	161	0	running	4
34	17	6	B. J. McLeod	JD Motorsports	Chevrolet	146	0	suspension	3
35	16	74	Bayley Currey	Mike Harmon Racing	Chevrolet	92	0	fuel pressure	0
36	36	66	Timmy Hill	MBM Motorsports	Toyota	55	0	vibration	0
Official race results

Previous race: 2020 UNOH 188	NASCAR Xfinity Series; 2020 season	Next race: 2020 Drydene 200 (Sunday)
