= Jani-King =

Commercial Cleaning services company

Jani-King International, Inc.
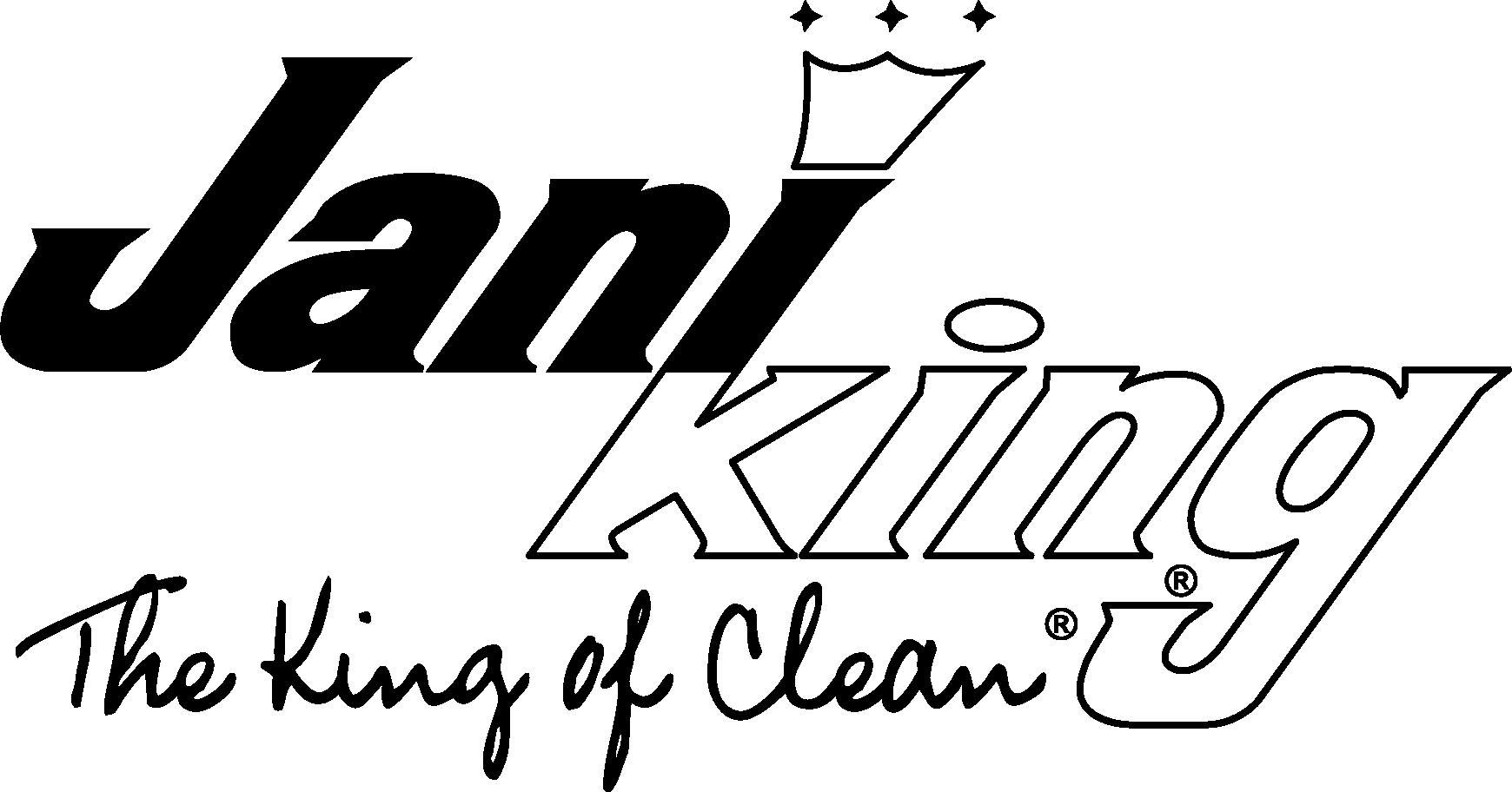
- Type: Private
- Industry: Janitorial Services and Commercial Cleaning Services
- Founded: June 15, 1969; 57 years ago in Oklahoma City, US
- Headquarters: Addison, Texas, US
- Key people: John Crawford (COO)
- Services: Janitorial services and commercial cleaning services
- Revenue: ▲US$859 million (2021); ▲US$774 million (2017)

Jani-King International, Inc. is an American chain of commercial cleaning services franchises. The company provides janitorial services and commercial cleaning services for public spaces such as offices, retails spaces, hotels, and stadiums.

== History ==
The company was founded by James Cavanaugh, Jr., in 1969. In 2001, it was the title sponsor of the NASCAR event at the Texas Motor Speedway now known as the SRS Distribution 250. In 2002, Cavanaugh was involved in a scandal when his girlfriend, Claire Robinson, died of a cocaine overdose while on vacation with him at his Caribbean holiday home. In 2019, a court found that a settlement payment of $2.3 million he had made to avoid negative publicity for the company and liability arising from Robinson's death was not a deductible business expense for his S corporation.

== Current organization ==
Jani-King's corporate offices are in Addison, Texas.

From its corporate headquarters, and through regional support offices in local markets, Jani-King provides its franchise owners additional training and certification programs for servicing hotels and hospitals. In August 2012, Jani-King partnered with a sports team, the Buffalo Bills.

== See also ==
- List of cleaning companies
