= 2018 TicketGuardian 500 =

Race details
- Race 4 of 36 in the 2018 Monster Energy NASCAR Cup Series
- The 2018 TicketGuardian 500 program cover.
- Date: March 11, 2018
- Location: ISM Raceway in Avondale, Arizona
- Course: Permanent racing facility
- Course length: 1 miles (1.6 km)
- Distance: 312 laps, 312 mi (499.2 km)
- Average speed: 108.073 miles per hour (173.927 km/h)

Pole position
Driver	Martin Truex Jr.	Furniture Row Racing
- Time: 26.288

Most laps led
Driver	Kyle Busch	Joe Gibbs Racing
- Laps: 128

Winner
No. 4	Kevin Harvick	Stewart–Haas Racing

Television in the United States
- Network: Fox
- Announcers: Mike Joy, Jeff Gordon and Darrell Waltrip
- Nielsen ratings: 2.9/2.8 (Overnight)

Radio in the United States
- Radio: MRN
- Booth announcers: Joe Moore, Jeff Striegle and Rusty Wallace
- Turn announcers: Dan Hubbard (1 & 2) and Kyle Rickey (3 & 4)

The 2018 TicketGuardian 500 was a Monster Energy NASCAR Cup Series race held on March 11, 2018, at ISM Raceway in Avondale, Arizona. Contested over 312 laps on the one-mile (1.6 km) oval, it was the fourth race of the 2018 Monster Energy NASCAR Cup Series season. It would also be the last Phoenix race to be using the 2011 reconfiguration as the start/finish line will be moved to the back-straightaway just past turn two for the November race.

== Report ==
=== Background ===
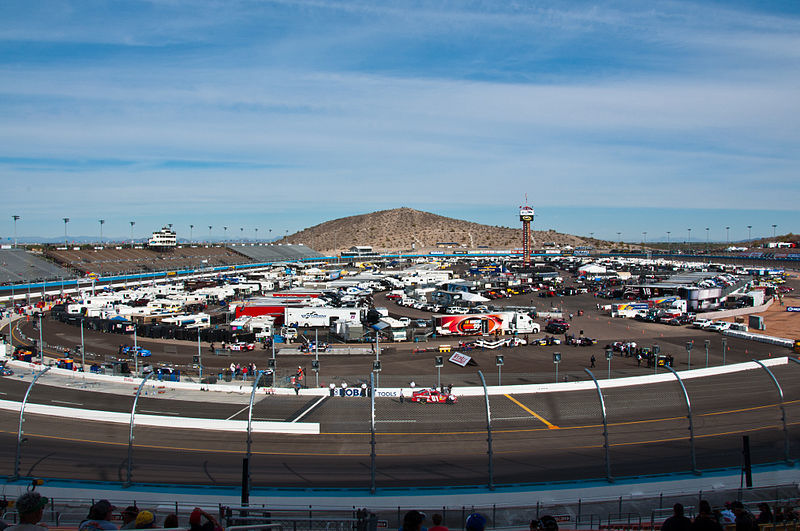
ISM Raceway was the site of the fourth race of the season

ISM Raceway, is a one-mile, low-banked tri-oval race track located in Avondale, Arizona. The motorsport track opened in 1964 and currently hosts two NASCAR race weekends annually. PIR has also hosted the IndyCar Series, CART, USAC and the Rolex Sports Car Series. The raceway is currently owned and operated by International Speedway Corporation.

==== Entry list ====
No.	Driver	Team	Manufacturer
00	Jeffrey Earnhardt	StarCom Racing	Chevrolet
1	Jamie McMurray	Chip Ganassi Racing	Chevrolet
2	Brad Keselowski	Team Penske	Ford
3	Austin Dillon	Richard Childress Racing	Chevrolet
4	Kevin Harvick	Stewart–Haas Racing	Ford
6	Trevor Bayne	Roush Fenway Racing	Ford
9	Chase Elliott	Hendrick Motorsports	Chevrolet
10	Aric Almirola	Stewart–Haas Racing	Ford
11	Denny Hamlin	Joe Gibbs Racing	Toyota
12	Ryan Blaney	Team Penske	Ford
13	Ty Dillon	Germain Racing	Chevrolet
14	Clint Bowyer	Stewart–Haas Racing	Ford
15	Ross Chastain (i)	Premium Motorsports	Chevrolet
17	Ricky Stenhouse Jr.	Roush Fenway Racing	Ford
18	Kyle Busch	Joe Gibbs Racing	Toyota
19	Daniel Suárez	Joe Gibbs Racing	Toyota
20	Erik Jones	Joe Gibbs Racing	Toyota
21	Paul Menard	Wood Brothers Racing	Ford
22	Joey Logano	Team Penske	Ford
23	Gray Gaulding	BK Racing	Toyota
24	William Byron (R)	Hendrick Motorsports	Chevrolet
31	Ryan Newman	Richard Childress Racing	Chevrolet
32	Matt DiBenedetto	Go Fas Racing	Ford
34	Michael McDowell	Front Row Motorsports	Ford
37	Chris Buescher	JTG Daugherty Racing	Chevrolet
38	David Ragan	Front Row Motorsports	Ford
41	Kurt Busch	Stewart–Haas Racing	Ford
42	Kyle Larson	Chip Ganassi Racing	Chevrolet
43	Bubba Wallace (R)	Richard Petty Motorsports	Chevrolet
47	A. J. Allmendinger	JTG Daugherty Racing	Chevrolet
48	Jimmie Johnson	Hendrick Motorsports	Chevrolet
51	Timmy Hill (i)	Rick Ware Racing	Chevrolet
72	Corey LaJoie	TriStar Motorsports	Chevrolet
78	Martin Truex Jr.	Furniture Row Racing	Toyota
88	Alex Bowman	Hendrick Motorsports	Chevrolet
95	Kasey Kahne	Leavine Family Racing	Chevrolet
96	D. J. Kennington	Gaunt Brothers Racing	Toyota
Official entry list

== First practice ==
Kyle Larson was the fastest in the first practice session with a time of 26.034 seconds and a speed of 138.281 mph (222.542 km/h).

Pos	No.	Driver	Team	Manufacturer	Time	Speed
1	42	Kyle Larson	Chip Ganassi Racing	Chevrolet	26.034	138.281
2	1	Jamie McMurray	Chip Ganassi Racing	Chevrolet	26.132	137.762
3	18	Kyle Busch	Joe Gibbs Racing	Toyota	26.151	137.662
Official first practice results

== Qualifying ==
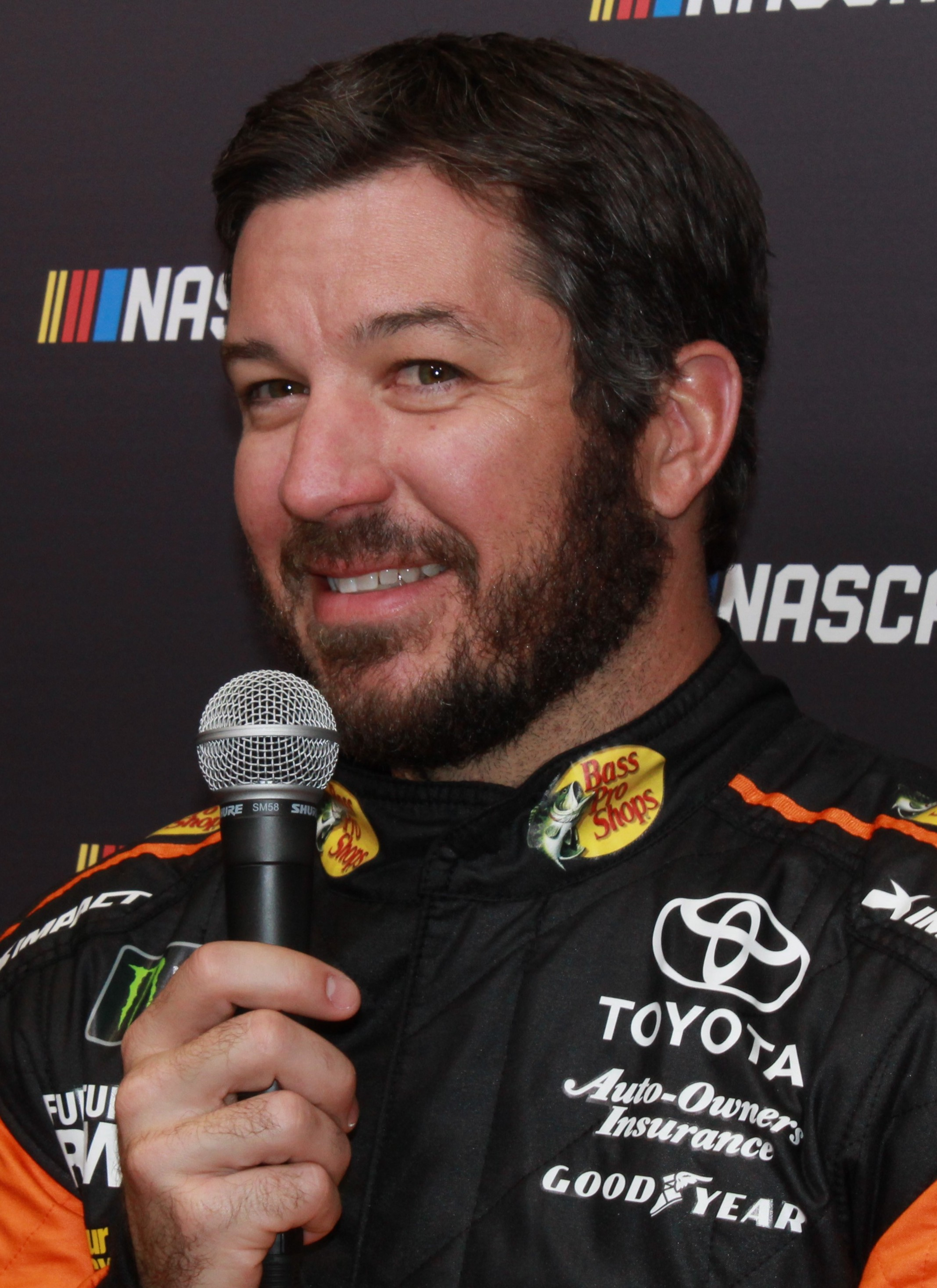
Martin Truex Jr. scored the pole position.

Martin Truex Jr. scored the pole for the race with a time of 26.288 and a speed of 136.945 mph (220.392 km/h).

=== Qualifying results ===
Pos	No.	Driver	Team	Manufacturer	R1	R2	R3
1	78	Martin Truex Jr.	Furniture Row Racing	Toyota	26.704	26.497	26.288
2	42	Kyle Larson	Chip Ganassi Racing	Chevrolet	26.706	26.400	26.346
3	9	Chase Elliott	Hendrick Motorsports	Chevrolet	26.655	26.406	26.446
4	88	Alex Bowman	Hendrick Motorsports	Chevrolet	26.770	26.439	26.455
5	11	Denny Hamlin	Joe Gibbs Racing	Toyota	26.682	26.445	26.490
6	18	Kyle Busch	Joe Gibbs Racing	Toyota	26.685	26.484	26.496
7	1	Jamie McMurray	Chip Ganassi Racing	Chevrolet	26.766	26.551	26.497
8	20	Erik Jones	Joe Gibbs Racing	Toyota	26.653	26.523	26.504
9	4	Kevin Harvick	Stewart–Haas Racing	Ford	26.771	26.596	26.564
10	22	Joey Logano	Team Penske	Ford	26.717	26.566	26.622
11	24	William Byron (R)	Hendrick Motorsports	Chevrolet	26.829	26.614	26.708
12	12	Ryan Blaney	Team Penske	Ford	26.840	26.614	26.711
13	31	Ryan Newman	Richard Childress Racing	Chevrolet	26.780	26.615	—
14	21	Paul Menard	Wood Brothers Racing	Ford	26.800	26.631	—
15	19	Daniel Suárez	Joe Gibbs Racing	Toyota	26.932	26.652	—
16	38	David Ragan	Front Row Motorsports	Ford	26.938	26.664	—
17	48	Jimmie Johnson	Hendrick Motorsports	Chevrolet	26.544	26.665	—
18	3	Austin Dillon	Richard Childress Racing	Chevrolet	26.914	26.667	—
19	14	Clint Bowyer	Stewart–Haas Racing	Ford	26.772	26.726	—
20	47	A. J. Allmendinger	JTG Daugherty Racing	Chevrolet	26.930	26.809	—
21	6	Trevor Bayne	Roush Fenway Racing	Ford	26.953	26.818	—
22	10	Aric Almirola	Stewart–Haas Racing	Ford	26.939	26.850	—
23	41	Kurt Busch	Stewart–Haas Racing	Ford	26.940	26.913	—
24	37	Chris Buescher	JTG Daugherty Racing	Chevrolet	26.941	26.953	—
25	2	Brad Keselowski	Team Penske	Ford	27.012	—	—
26	95	Kasey Kahne	Leavine Family Racing	Chevrolet	27.024	—	—
27	43	Bubba Wallace (R)	Richard Petty Motorsports	Chevrolet	27.057	—	—
28	13	Ty Dillon	Germain Racing	Chevrolet	27.065	—	—
29	17	Ricky Stenhouse Jr.	Roush Fenway Racing	Ford	27.084	—	—
30	32	Matt DiBenedetto	Go Fas Racing	Ford	27.150	—	—
31	34	Michael McDowell	Front Row Motorsports	Ford	27.305	—	—
32	23	Gray Gaulding	BK Racing	Toyota	27.542	—	—
33	72	Corey LaJoie	TriStar Motorsports	Chevrolet	27.612	—	—
34	96	D. J. Kennington	Gaunt Brothers Racing	Toyota	27.757	—	—
35	51	Timmy Hill (i)	Rick Ware Racing	Chevrolet	27.931	—	—
36	15	Ross Chastain (i)	Premium Motorsports	Chevrolet	28.004	—	—
37	00	Jeffrey Earnhardt	StarCom Racing	Chevrolet	0.000	—	—
Official qualifying results

== Practice (post-qualifying) ==
=== Second practice ===
Kevin Harvick was the fastest in the second practice session with a time of 26.705 seconds and a speed of 134.806 mph (216.949 km/h).

Pos	No.	Driver	Team	Manufacturer	Time	Speed
1	4	Kevin Harvick	Stewart–Haas Racing	Ford	26.705	134.806
2	9	Chase Elliott	Hendrick Motorsports	Chevrolet	26.705	134.806
3	18	Kyle Busch	Joe Gibbs Racing	Toyota	26.735	134.655
Official second practice results

=== Final practice ===
Kevin Harvick was the fastest in the final practice session with a time of 26.757 seconds and a speed of 134.544 mph (216.528 km/h).

Pos	No.	Driver	Team	Manufacturer	Time	Speed
1	4	Kevin Harvick	Stewart–Haas Racing	Ford	26.757	134.544
2	1	Jamie McMurray	Chip Ganassi Racing	Chevrolet	26.765	134.504
3	78	Martin Truex Jr.	Furniture Row Racing	Toyota	26.775	134.454
Official final practice results

== Race results ==
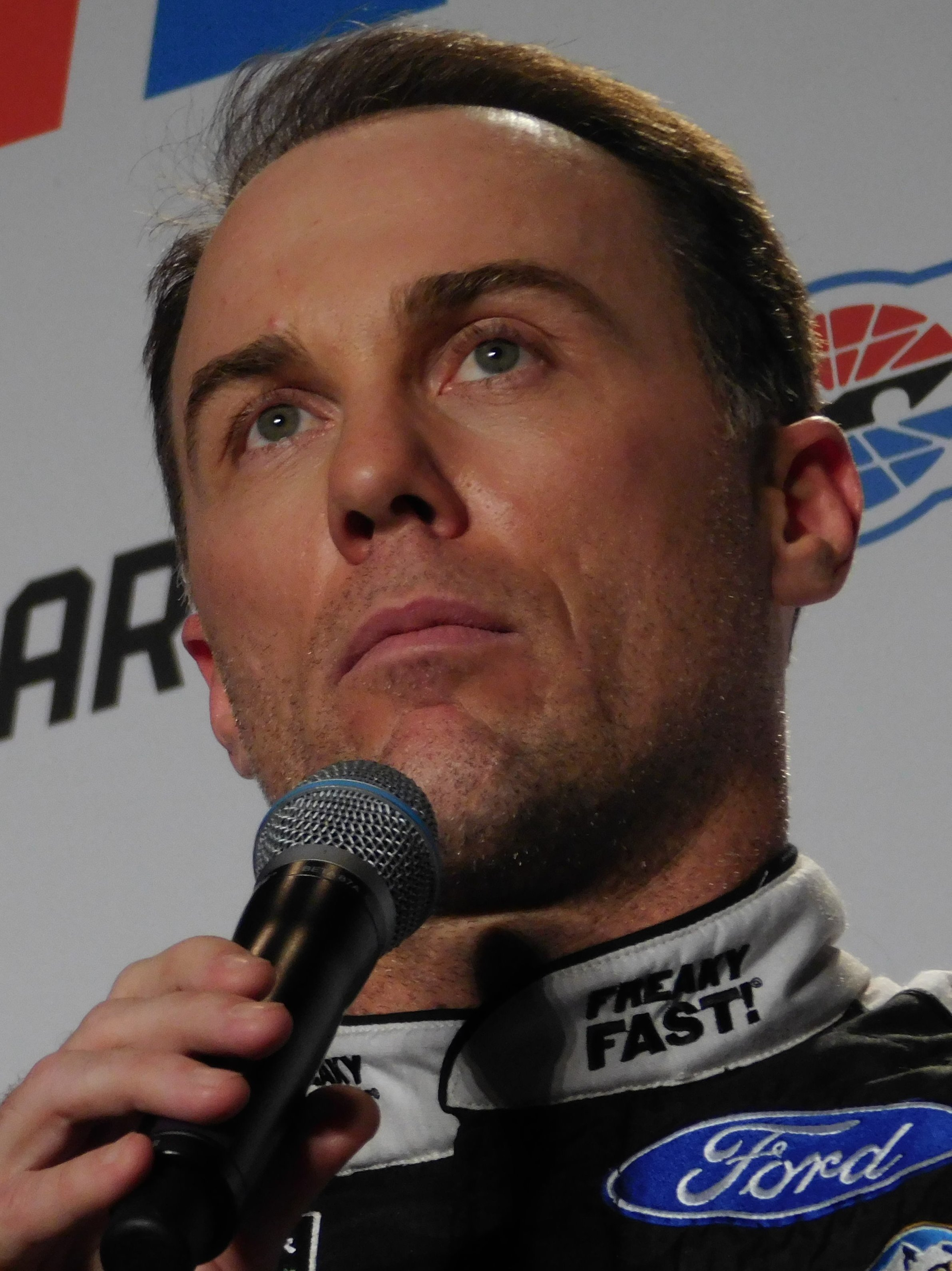
Kevin Harvick won the race.

=== Stage Results ===
Stage 1 Laps: 75

Pos	No	Driver	Team	Manufacturer	Points
1	18	Kyle Busch	Joe Gibbs Racing	Toyota	10
2	4	Kevin Harvick	Stewart-Hass Racing	Ford	9
3	42	Kyle Larson	Chip Ganassi Racing	Chevrolet	8
4	11	Denny Hamlin	Joe Gibbs Racing	Toyota	7
5	78	Martin Truex Jr.	Furniture Row Racing	Toyota	6
6	9	Chase Elliott	Hendrick Motorsports	Chevrolet	5
7	2	Brad Keselowski	Team Penske	Ford	4
8	41	Kurt Busch	Stewart–Haas Racing	Ford	3
9	22	Joey Logano	Team Penske	Ford	2
10	20	Erik Jones	Joe Gibbs Racing	Toyota	1
Official stage one results

Stage 2 Laps: 75

Pos	No	Driver	Team	Manufacturer	Points
1	41	Kurt Busch	Stewart–Haas Racing	Ford	10
2	2	Brad Keselowski	Team Penske	Ford	9
3	17	Ricky Stenhouse Jr.	Roush Fenway Racing	Ford	8
4	18	Kyle Busch	Joe Gibbs Racing	Toyota	7
5	34	Michael McDowell	Front Row Racing	Ford	6
6	13	Ty Dillon	Germain Racing	Chevrolet	5
7	4	Kevin Harvick	Stewart–Haas Racing	Ford	4
8	78	Martin Truex Jr.	Furniture Row Racing	Toyota	3
9	95	Kasey Kahne	Leavine Family Racing	Chevrolet	2
10	14	Clint Bowyer	Stewart–Haas Racing	Ford	1
Official stage two results

=== Final Stage Results ===
Stage 3 Laps: 162

Pos	Grid	No	Driver	Team	Manufacturer	Laps	Points
1	10	4	Kevin Harvick	Stewart–Haas Racing	Ford	312	53
2	7	18	Kyle Busch	Joe Gibbs Racing	Toyota	312	52
3	3	9	Chase Elliott	Hendrick Motorsports	Chevrolet	312	39
4	6	11	Denny Hamlin	Joe Gibbs Racing	Toyota	312	40
5	1	78	Martin Truex Jr.	Furniture Row Racing	Toyota	312	41
6	19	14	Clint Bowyer	Stewart–Haas Racing	Ford	312	32
7	22	10	Aric Almirola	Stewart–Haas Racing	Ford	312	30
8	15	19	Daniel Suárez	Joe Gibbs Racing	Toyota	312	29
9	9	20	Erik Jones	Joe Gibbs Racing	Toyota	312	29
10	23	41	Kurt Busch	Stewart–Haas Racing	Ford	312	40
11	13	31	Ryan Newman	Richard Childress Racing	Chevrolet	312	26
12	11	24	William Byron (R)	Hendrick Motorsports	Chevrolet	312	25
13	4	88	Alex Bowman	Hendrick Motorsports	Chevrolet	312	24
14	17	48	Jimmie Johnson	Hendrick Motorsports	Chevrolet	312	23
15	25	2	Brad Keselowski	Team Penske	Ford	312	35
16	12	12	Ryan Blaney	Team Penske	Ford	311	21
17	18	3	Austin Dillon	Richard Childress Racing	Chevrolet	311	20
18	2	42	Kyle Larson	Chip Ganassi Racing	Chevrolet	311	27
19	5	22	Joey Logano	Team Penske	Ford	311	20
20	21	6	Trevor Bayne	Roush Fenway Racing	Ford	311	17
21	20	47	A. J. Allmendinger	JTG Daugherty Racing	Chevrolet	311	16
22	16	38	David Ragan	Front Row Motorsports	Ford	311	15
23	29	17	Ricky Stenhouse Jr.	Roush Fenway Racing	Ford	311	22
24	26	95	Kasey Kahne	Leavine Family Racing	Chevrolet	311	15
25	30	32	Matt DiBenedetto	Go Fas Racing	Ford	311	12
26	8	1	Jamie McMurray	Chip Ganassi Racing	Chevrolet	310	11
27	36	15	Ross Chastain (i)	Premium Motorsports	Chevrolet	310	0
28	27	43	Bubba Wallace (R)	Richard Petty Motorsports	Chevrolet	309	9
29	24	37	Chris Buescher	JTG Daugherty Racing	Chevrolet	309	8
30	28	13	Ty Dillon	Germain Racing	Chevrolet	309	12
31	34	96	D. J. Kennington	Gault Brothers Racing	Toyota	309	6
32	31	34	Michael McDowell	Front Row Motorsports	Ford	308	11
33	35	51	Timmy Hill (i)	Rick Ware Racing	Chevrolet	306	0
34	32	23	Gray Gaulding	BK Racing	Toyota	304	3
35	37	00	Jeffrey Earnhardt	StarCom Racing	Chevrolet	292	2
36	14	21	Paul Menard	Wood Brothers Racing	Ford	189	1
37	33	72	Corey LaJoie	TriStar Motorsports	Chevrolet	23	1
Official race results

=== Race statistics ===
- Lead changes: 9 among different drivers
- Cautions/Laps: 6 for 36
- Red flags: 0
- Time of race: 2 hours, 53 minutes and 13 seconds
- Average speed: 107.617 miles per hour (173.193 km/h)

== Media ==
=== Television ===
Fox Sports covered their 14th race at the Phoenix International Raceway. Mike Joy, two-time Phoenix winner Jeff Gordon and Darrell Waltrip had the call in the booth for the race. Jamie Little, Vince Welch and Matt Yocum handled the pit road duties for the television side.

Fox
Booth announcers	Pit reporters
Lap-by-lap: Mike Joy; Color-commentator: Jeff Gordon; Color commentator: Darrell Waltrip	Jamie Little; Vince Welch; Matt Yocum

=== Radio ===
MRN had the radio call for the race which also was simulcasted on Sirius XM NASCAR Radio.

MRN
Booth announcers	Turn announcers	Pit reporters
Lead announcer: Joe Moore; Announcer: Jeff Striegle; Announcer: Rusty Wallace	Turns 1 & 2: Dan Hubbard; Turns 3 & 4: Kyle Rickey	Alex Hayden; Glenn Jarrett; Steve Post

== Standings after the race ==
Drivers' Championship standings

	Pos	Driver	Points
2	1	Kevin Harvick	168
3	2	Kyle Busch	156 (–12)
1	3	Martin Truex Jr.	156 (–12)
3	4	Joey Logano	152 (–16)
3	5	Ryan Blaney	152 (–16)
2	6	Denny Hamlin	137 (–31)
	7	Brad Keselowski	134 (–34)
2	8	Kyle Larson	131 (–37)
2	9	Clint Bowyer	125 (–43)
2	10	Aric Almirola	123 (–45)
2	11	Kurt Busch	117 (–51)
2	12	Austin Dillon	114 (–54)
1	13	Ryan Newman	101 (–67)
5	14	Paul Menard	97 (–71)
4	15	Erik Jones	93 (–75)
5	16	Chase Elliott	91 (–77)
Official driver's standings

Manufacturers' Championship standings

	Pos	Manufacturer	Points
	1	Ford	145
1	2	Toyota	137 (–8)
1	3	Chevrolet	136 (–9)
Official manufacturers' standings

- Note: Only the first 16 positions are included for the driver standings.

Previous race: 2018 Pennzoil 400	Monster Energy NASCAR Cup Series; 2018 season	Next race: 2018 Auto Club 400
