= Gray Gaulding =

American racing driver (born 1998)

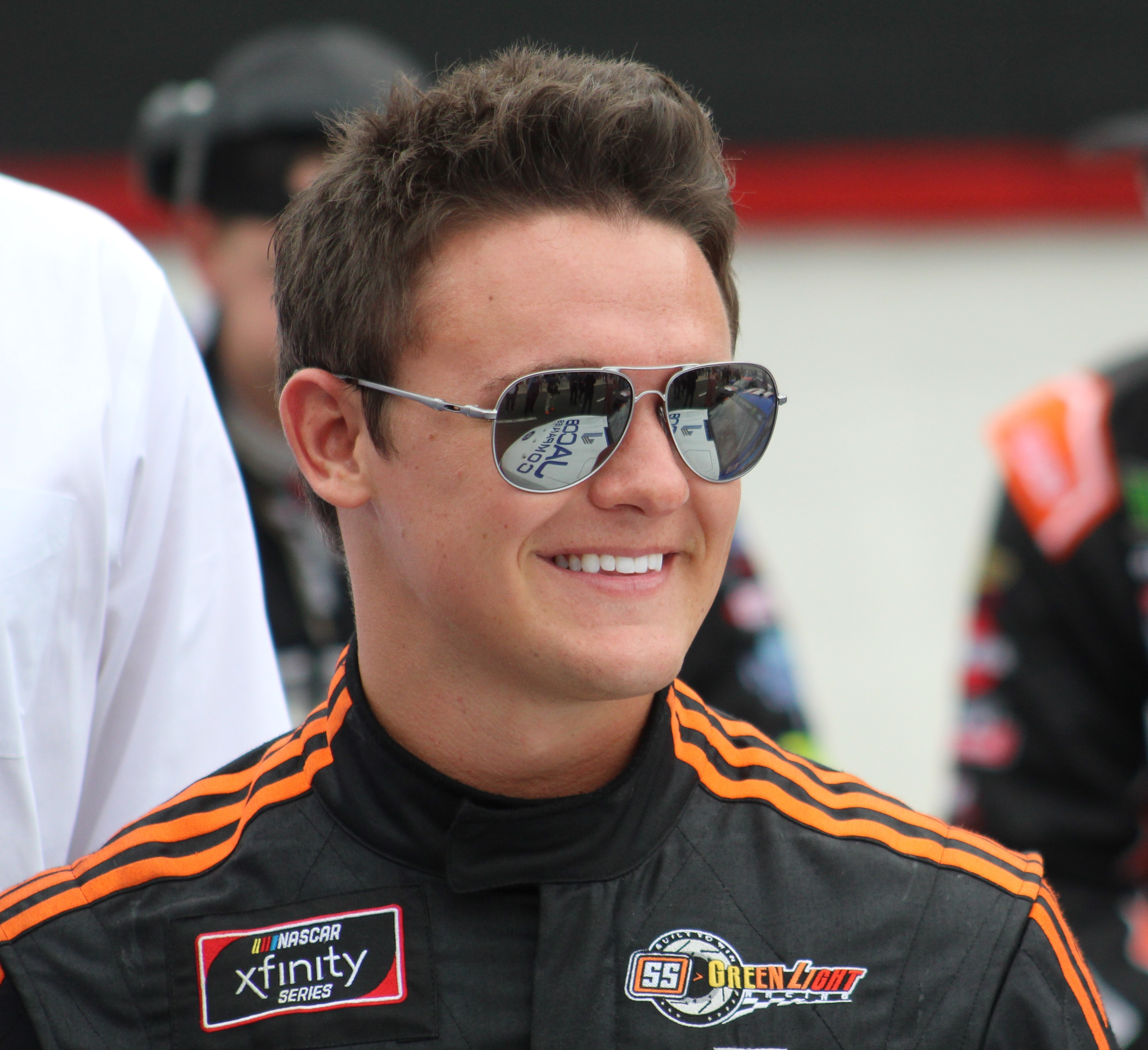
- Gaulding at Bristol Motor Speedway in 2019
- Born: Dwayne Gray Gaulding Jr. February 10, 1998 (age 28); Colonial Heights, Virginia, U.S.
- Achievements: 3rd Youngest winner ever in a NASCAR-sanctioned series (15y/8m/28d); 2nd Youngest winner ever in the NASCAR K&N Pro Series East (15); Youngest Legend Car winner ever (12); Youngest Legend Car Champion ever (12)

NASCAR Cup Series career
- 62 races run over 7 years
- 2026 position: 49th
- Best finish: 34th (2017)
- First race: 2016 Goody's Fast Relief 500 (Martinsville)
- Last race: 2026 YellaWood 500 (Talladega)
Wins	Top tens	Poles
0	1	0

NASCAR O'Reilly Auto Parts Series career
- 80 races run over 9 years
- 2026 position: 55th
- Best finish: 13th (2019)
- First race: 2016 Food City 300 (Bristol)
- Last race: 2026 Suburban Propane 300 (Bristol)
Wins	Top tens	Poles
0	8	0

NASCAR FedEx Freight Truck Series career
- 19 races run over 4 years
- 2020 position: 69th
- Best finish: 26th (2014)
- First race: 2014 Kroger 250 (Martinsville)
- Last race: 2020 Baptist Health 200 (Homestead)
Wins	Top tens	Poles
0	2	0
- Statistics up to date as of November 8, 2026.

Dwayne Gray Gaulding Jr. (born February 10, 1998) is an American professional stock car racing driver. He last competed part-time in the NASCAR O'Reilly Auto Parts Series, driving the No. 74 Chevrolet Camaro SS for Mike Harmon Racing, and part-time in the NASCAR Cup Series, driving the No. 66 Ford Mustang Dark Horse for Garage 66. He previously competed in the NASCAR Gander RV & Outdoors Truck Series.

== Racing career ==
Gaulding began racing motorbikes at the age of four, and raced cars five years later. When he was ten, Gaulding received two Bandolero cars, and won in his first Bandolero race. At the age of 12, Gaulding was the youngest driver in a NASCAR Legends Division, and won a Legends car national championship, gaining sponsorship from firearm distributor GunBroker.com. Also at the age of twelve, Gaulding defeated NASCAR Sprint Cup Series driver Kevin Harvick at Harvick's karting track, which prompted Harvick to sign Gaulding to Kevin Harvick Incorporated's driver development program. At thirteen, Gaulding became the youngest Super late model race winner, and was also the youngest driver to win the Pro All Stars Series (PASS) Rookie of the Year Award. After KHI shut down in 2011, he was released from the team's driver development program. When he was fourteen, Gaulding was volunteering at the Victory Junction Gang Camp when he agreed to five one-year contracts with Krispy Kreme as a sponsor.

=== K&N Pro Series East ===
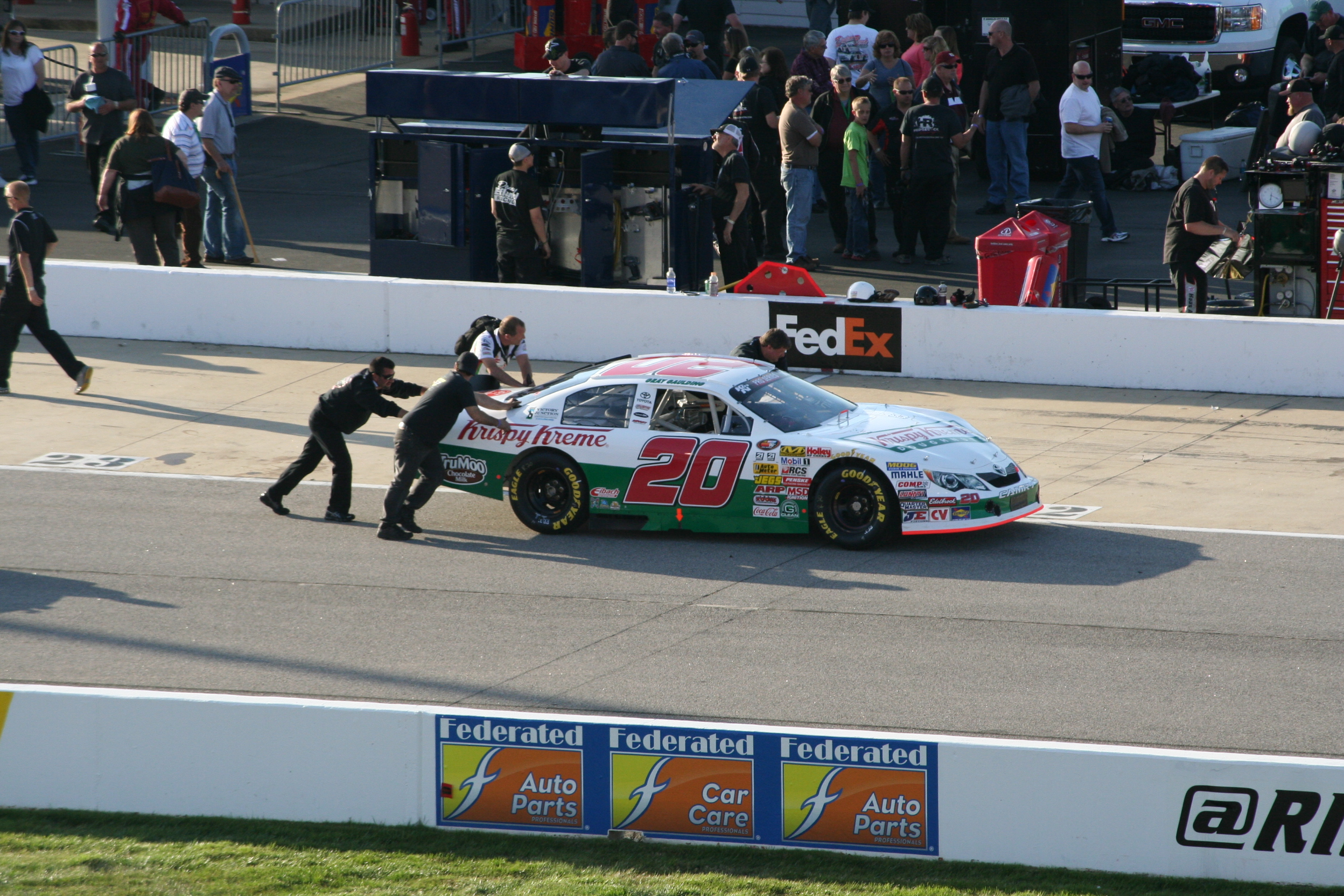
Gaulding's No. 20 Toyota in the K&N Pro Series East race at Richmond International Raceway

In 2013, Gaulding ran the No. 20 Krispy Kreme Toyota in both the K&N Pro Series East and West. He won the pole position at Richmond International Raceway at fifteen years, two months, fifteen days, becoming the youngest pole-sitter in NASCAR history, more than four months younger than Cole Custer, the previous record holder. In the season-ending Pro Series West race at Phoenix International Raceway, Gaulding spun out Custer on the final lap to win, becoming the youngest race winner in K&N series history at 15 years, 8 months and 30 days. During the year, Gaulding was named to the NASCAR Next program, which highlights NASCAR's future stars. In 2014, Gaulding was hired by NTS Motorsports to run full-time in the K&N East series.

=== Truck Series ===
Gaulding joined NTS Motorsports in the No. 20, and ran eight races in the 2014 NASCAR Camping World Truck Series season; he made his Truck Series debut at Martinsville Speedway. On lap 243, Gaulding was running three-wide, and was turned around. Gaulding finished nineteenth. Gaulding recorded his best finish of the year at Canadian Tire Motorsport Park, finishing fourth in the Chevrolet Silverado 250.

On March 23, 2015, Gaulding was released by NTS Motorsports, and joined Red Horse Racing, making his debut for the team at Martinsville where he finished seventeenth. He later joined Kyle Busch Motorsports, driving the No. 54 Toyota Tundra in three races at Mosport, New Hampshire and Martinsville.

=== O'Reilly Auto Parts Series ===
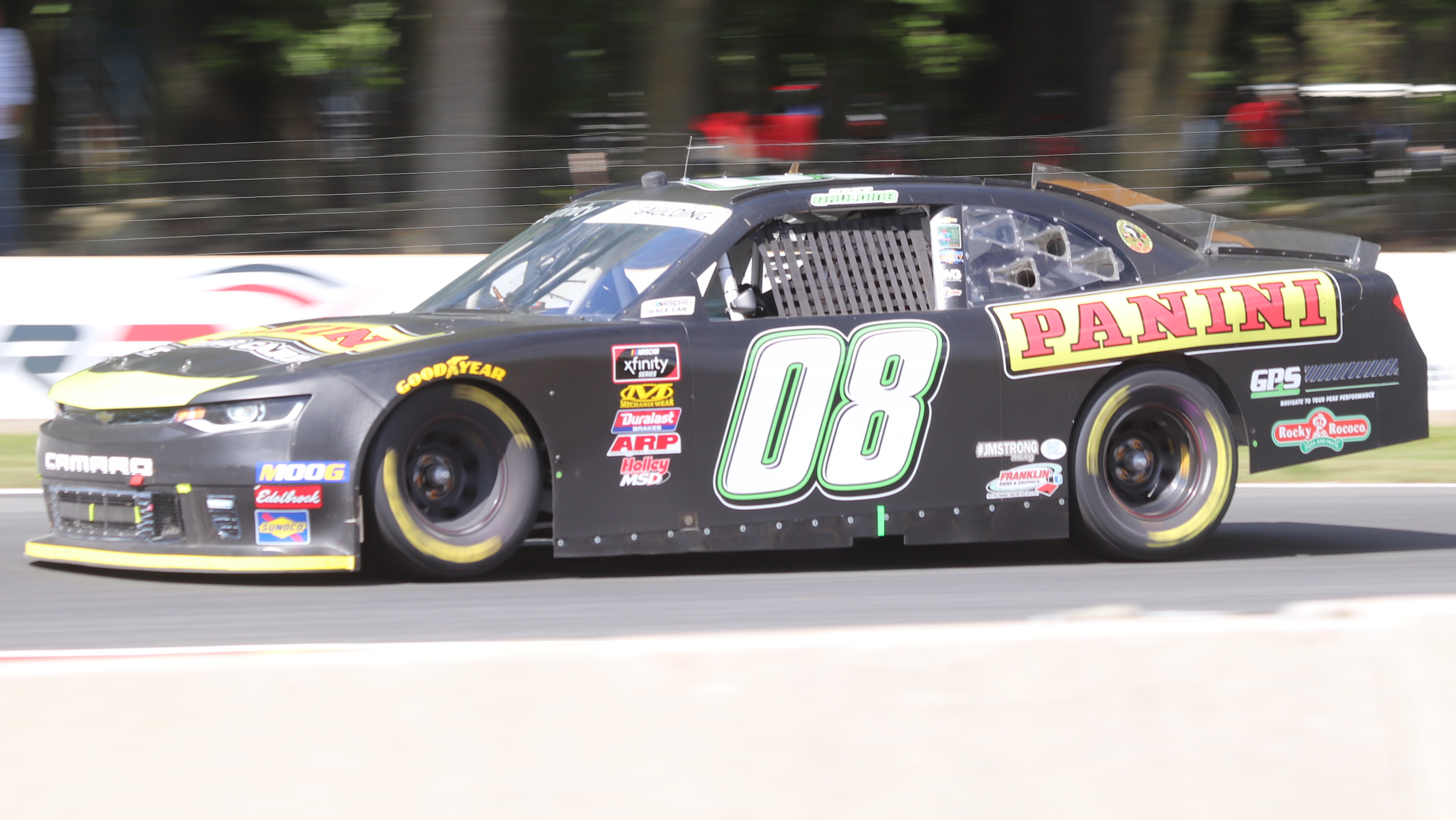
Gaulding in the No. 08 at Road America in 2019

In 2016, Gaulding joined Roush Fenway Racing's driver development program and made his NASCAR Xfinity Series debut in the No. 60 at Bristol Motor Speedway, while also running another round at Richmond.

For the 2019 season, Gaulding drove No. 08 Chevy for SS-Green Light Racing full-time. In April's MoneyLion 300 at Talladega Superspeedway, Gaulding finished a career-best second behind Tyler Reddick.

On January 16, 2020, it was announced that Joe Graf Jr. would take over the No. 08 car for the 2020 NASCAR Xfinity Series season, leaving Gaulding without a ride. Despite losing his full-time seat with the team, Gaulding returned to SS-Green Light for Talladega, where he piloted the No. 07 to an eighth-place run. Another ride opportunity with the same team saw Gaulding score another second-place finish in the Wawa 250 at Daytona International Speedway, being beaten by eventual winner Justin Haley. Gaulding later joined Mike Harmon Racing for a late-season drive at the Charlotte Motor Speedway Roval.

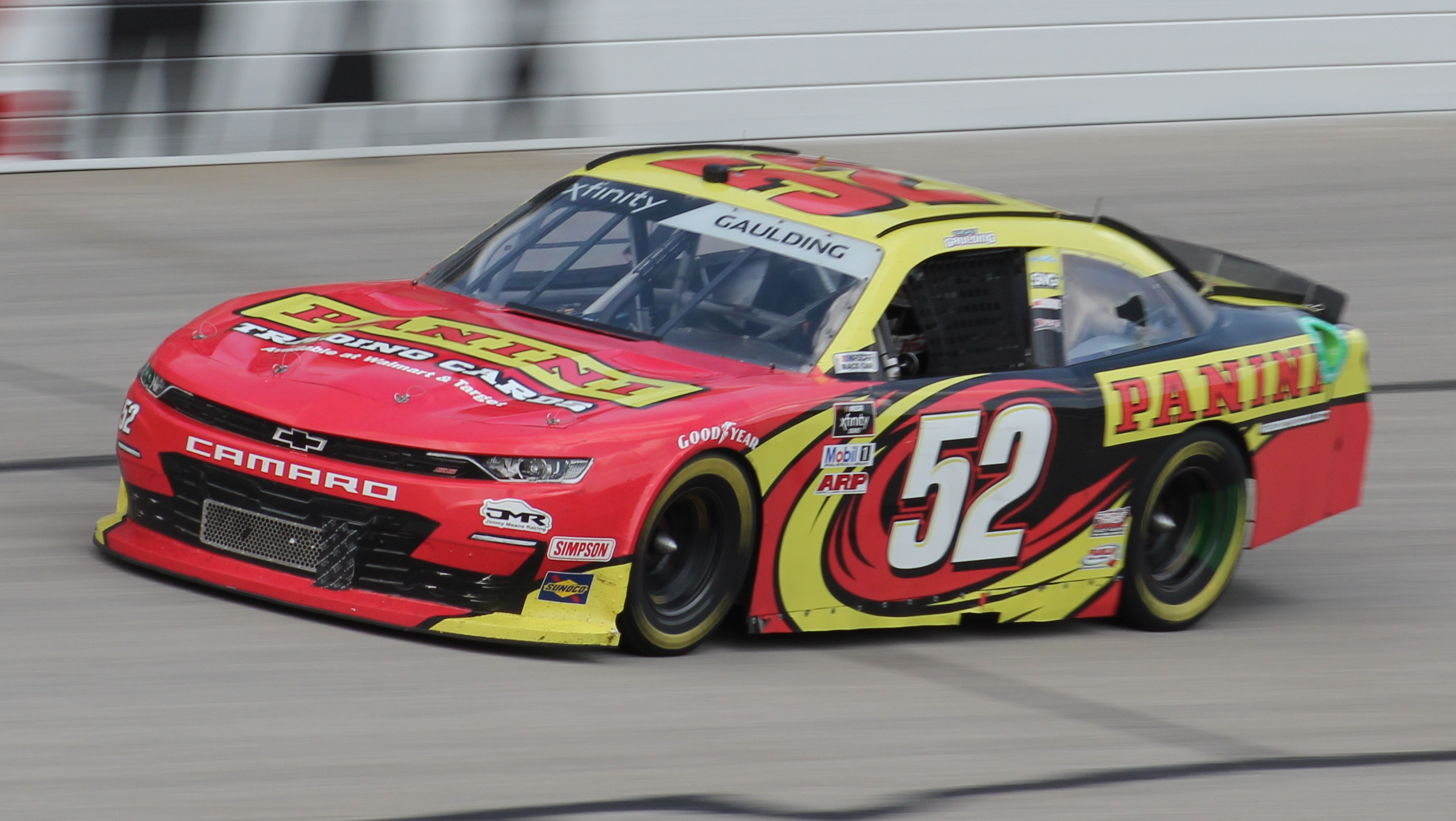
Gaulding's No. 52 car at Atlanta Motor Speedway in 2021

On January 26, 2021, it was reported that Gaulding would return to the Xfinity Series full-time for Jimmy Means Racing. At the conclusion of the Martinsville race, a fight broke out on pit road between Gaulding and Joe Graf Jr. after Gaulding wrecked Graf on lap 177.

Gaulding would only make a handful of starts in 2022, splitting time between Mike Harmon Racing and JD Motorsports with a best finish of 21st at Talladega Superspeedway.

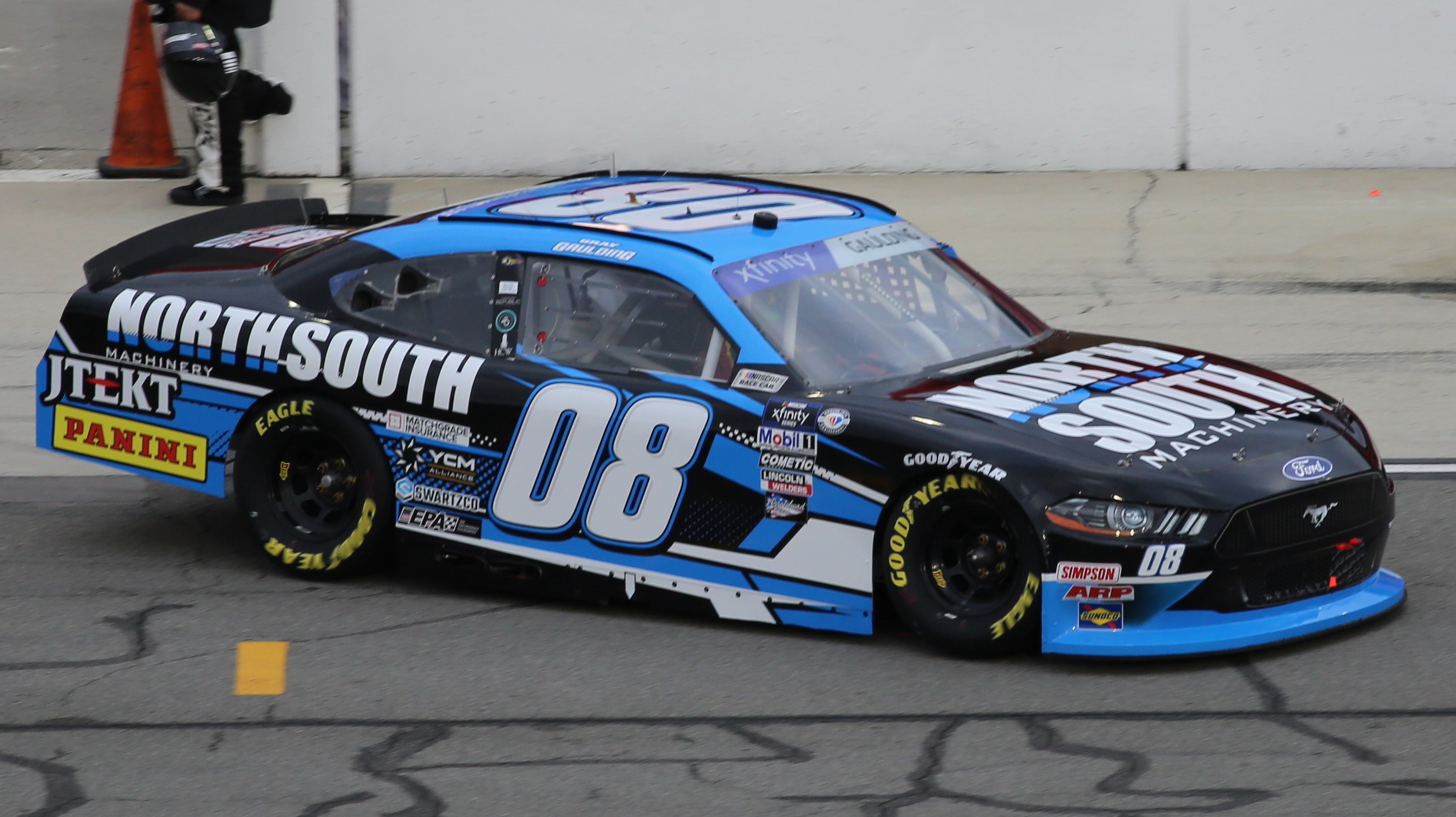
Gaulding at Auto Club Speedway in 2023

In 2023, Gaulding would return to SS-Green Light Racing in the No. 08 in a mix of Chevrolets and Fords with Blaine Perkins as his teammate.

On April 8, 2026, it was announced that Gaulding would drive the No. 74 Chevrolet for Mike Harmon Racing at Bristol, marking his first race since 2023.

=== Cup Series ===
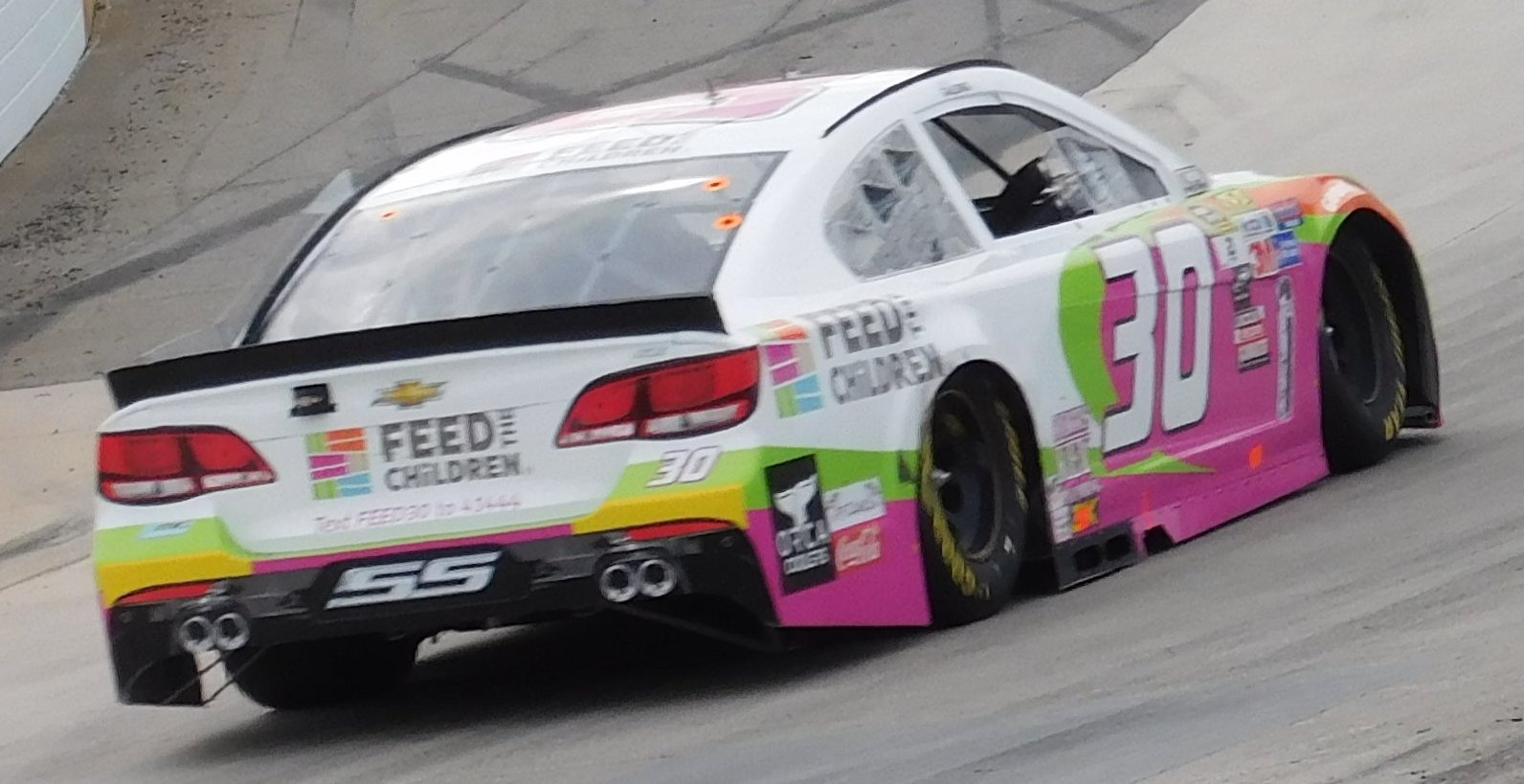
Gaulding's No. 30 car at Martinsville Speedway in 2016

In late 2016, Gaulding attempted to make his Sprint Cup Series debut at Martinsville, driving the No. 30 car for The Motorsports Group. Gaulding joined BK Racing's No. 23 car for the 2017 season, driving in 33 races. Gaulding was not approved to run the Daytona 500 due to lack of experience on larger tracks (1.5 miles or greater). On June 13, 2017, he was replaced by Ryan Sieg at Michigan. Later in the month, Gaulding announced he had joined Premium Motorsports' No. 55 Camry for the Cup races at Kentucky and Loudon. On June 5, 2017, BK Racing released Gaulding because of financial issues; however, he would later return to the team at Darlington. At Talladega, Gaulding survived a crash-filled race to post his career-best finish of ninth.

Gaulding would return to BK Racing in 2018, but left the team after running the first seventeen races as it fell into financial turmoil. He joined StarCom Racing for two races in the No. 99 before moving to Rick Ware Racing. He returned to Ware for the 2019 Food City 500 and a part-time schedule in 2020.

In 2023, Gaulding rejoined Rick Ware Racing at Gateway, this time in the No. 15 Ford, where he finished in 29th.

In 2026, it was revealed that Gaulding would attempt to run at the summer race at Daytona with Garage 66 in the No. 66 Ford. After failing to qualify, it was revealed that he will attempt to run at Charlotte and Martinsville with the team.

== Personal life ==
Gaulding is the son of Dwayne and Kristin (Martek) Gaulding. A native of Colonial Heights, Virginia, Gaulding's father, Dwayne, was the vice president of operations at NTS Motorsports.

Gaulding's brother-in-law is fellow race car driver Zane Smith.

On April 2, 2024, Gaulding was arrested for a misdemeanor crime of domestic violence. He was indefinitely suspended by NASCAR the following day. The misdemeanor would later be dismissed on July 29.

== Motorsports career results ==
=== Career summary ===
Season	Series	Team	Races	Wins	Top 5s	Top 10s	Poles	Points	Position
2013	NASCAR K&N Pro Series West	Steve Urvan	3	1	1	2	1	109	27th
2013	NASCAR K&N Pro Series East	Steve Urvan	14	0	3	8	1	456	8th
2014	NASCAR K&N Pro Series East	NTS Motorsports	16	0	4	9	1	562	3rd
2014	NASCAR K&N Pro Series West	NTS Motorsports	2	0	1	1	0	57	41st
2014	NASCAR Camping World Truck Series	NTS Motorsports	9	0	1	1	0	243	26th
2015	NASCAR Camping World Truck Series	Red Horse Racing; Kyle Busch Motorsports	4	0	0	0	0	118	34th
2016	NASCAR Sprint Cup Series	The Motorsports Group	2	0	0	0	0	6	48th
2016	NASCAR Xfinity Series	Roush Fenway Racing	2	0	0	0	0	0	108th
2017	Monster Energy NASCAR Cup Series	BK Racing; Premium Motorsports	27	0	0	1	0	164	34th
2017	NASCAR Xfinity Series	RSS Racing	5	0	0	0	0	0	111th
2018	Monster Energy NASCAR Cup Series	BK Racing; Premium Motorsports; StarCom Racing; Rick Ware Racing	20	0	0	0	0	119	36th
2018	NASCAR Xfinity Series	NXT Motorsports	1	0	0	0	0	0	106th
2019	Monster Energy NASCAR Cup Series	Rick Ware Racing	1	0	0	0	0	0	64th
2019	NASCAR Xfinity Series	SS-Green Light Racing	33	0	1	4	0	713	13th
2020	NASCAR Cup Series	Rick Ware Racing	9	0	0	0	0	0	50th
2020	NASCAR Xfinity Series	SS-Green Light Racing, Mike Harmon Racing	6	0	1	2	0	0	74th
2020	NASCAR Gander RV & Outdoors Truck Series	Reaume Brothers Racing	2	0	0	0	0	16	69th
2021	NASCAR Xfinity Series	Jimmy Means Racing, Mike Harmon Racing	19	0	0	0	0	140	34th
2022	NASCAR Xfinity Series	JD Motorsports, Mike Harmon Racing	2	0	0	0	0	17	62nd
2023	NASCAR Cup Series	Rick Ware Racing	1	0	0	0	0	0	59th
2023	NASCAR Xfinity Series	SS-Green Light Racing	11	0	0	2	0	132	37th

=== NASCAR ===
(key) (Bold – Pole position awarded by time. Italics – Pole position earned by points standings. * – Most laps led.)

==== Cup Series ====
NASCAR Cup Series results
Year	Team	No.	Make	1	2	3	4	5	6	7	8	9	10	11	12	13	14	15	16	17	18	19	20	21	22	23	24	25	26	27	28	29	30	31	32	33	34	35	36	NCSC	Pts	Ref
2016	The Motorsports Group	30	Chevy	DAY	ATL	LVS	PHO	CAL	MAR	TEX	BRI	RCH	TAL	KAN	DOV	CLT	POC	MCH	SON	DAY	KEN	NHA	IND	POC	GLN	BRI	MCH	DAR	RCH	CHI	NHA	DOV	CLT	KAN	TAL	MAR; 39	TEX	PHO; 37	HOM; DNQ	48th	6	
2017	BK Racing	23	Toyota	DAY	ATL; 37	LVS; 34	PHO; 36	CAL; 37	MAR; 29	TEX; 34	BRI; 29	RCH; 31	TAL; 20	KAN; 34	CLT; 27	DOV; 24	POC; 29	MCH	SON	DAY									RCH; 35											34th	164	
2017	Premium Motorsports	55	Toyota																		KEN; 35	NHA; 35								CHI; 38	NHA; 33	DOV	CLT; 36		KAN; 28					34th	164	
2017	Premium Motorsports	55	Chevy																				IND; 24				BRI; 31													34th	164	
2017	Premium Motorsports	15	Chevy																					POC; 31	GLN	MCH														34th	164	
2017	BK Racing	83	Toyota																									DAR; 36						TAL; 9		MAR; 31	TEX; 40	PHO	HOM	34th	164	
2018	BK Racing	23	Toyota	DAY; 20	ATL; 36	LVS; 33	PHO; 34	CAL; 32	MAR; 36	TEX; 20	BRI; 31	RCH; 35	TAL; 24	DOV; 30	KAN; 29	CLT; 31	POC; 33	MCH; 31	SON; 30	CHI; 31	DAY	KEN	NHA																	36th	119	
2018	Premium Motorsports	15	Chevy																					POC; QL^{†}	GLN															36th	119	
2018	StarCom Racing	99	Chevy																							MCH; 33	BRI; 40	DAR	IND	LVS										36th	119	
2018	Rick Ware Racing	52	Ford																												RCH; 40	ROV	DOV	TAL	KAN	MAR	TEX	PHO	HOM	36th	119	
2019	Rick Ware Racing	51	Ford	DAY	ATL	LVS	PHO	CAL	MAR	TEX	BRI; 36	RCH	TAL	DOV	KAN	CLT	POC	MCH	SON	CHI	DAY	KEN	NHA	POC	GLN	MCH	BRI	DAR	IND	LVS	RCH	ROV	DOV	TAL	KAN	MAR	TEX	PHO	HOM	64th	0^{1}	
2020	Rick Ware Racing	27	Ford	DAY	LVS	CAL	PHO	DAR	DAR; 32	CLT; 31	CLT; 30	BRI; 30	ATL	MAR	HOM	TAL; 30	POC	POC	IND	KEN	TEX; 25	KAN	NHA	MCH	MCH	DRC	DOV	DOV	DAY	DAR	RCH	BRI; 27	LVS; 31	TAL	ROV; 26	KAN	TEX	MAR	PHO	50th	0^{1}	
2023	Rick Ware Racing	15	Ford	DAY	CAL	LVS	PHO	ATL	COA	RCH	BRD	MAR	TAL	DOV	KAN	DAR	CLT	GTW; 29	SON	NSH	CSC	ATL	NHA	POC	RCH	MCH	IRC	GLN	DAY	DAR	KAN	BRI	TEX	TAL	ROV	LVS	HOM	MAR	PHO	59th	0^{1}	
2026	Garage 66	66	Ford	DAY	ATL	COA	PHO	LVS	DAR	MAR	BRI	KAN	TAL	TEX	GLN	CLT	NSH	MCH	POC	COR	SON	CHI	ATL	NWS	IND	IOW	RCH	NHA	DAY; DNQ	DAR	GTW	BRI	KAN	LVS	CLT; 36	PHO	TAL; 23	MAR	HOM	49th	0^{1}	
^{†} – Qualified for Ross Chastain.

^{*} Season still in progress
^{1} Ineligible for series points

===== Daytona 500 =====
Year	Team	Manufacturer	Start	Finish
2018	BK Racing	Toyota	34	20

==== O'Reilly Auto Parts Series ====
NASCAR O'Reilly Auto Parts Series results
Year	Team	No.	Make	1	2	3	4	5	6	7	8	9	10	11	12	13	14	15	16	17	18	19	20	21	22	23	24	25	26	27	28	29	30	31	32	33	NOAPSC	Pts	Ref
2016	Roush Fenway Racing	60	Ford	DAY	ATL	LVS	PHO	CAL	TEX	BRI	RCH	TAL	DOV	CLT	POC	MCH	IOW	DAY	KEN	NHA	IND	IOW	GLN	MOH	BRI; 13	ROA	DAR	RCH; 13	CHI	KEN	DOV	CLT	KAN	TEX	PHO	HOM	108th	0^{1}	
2017	RSS Racing	38	Chevy	DAY	ATL	LVS	PHO	CAL	TEX	BRI	RCH	TAL	CLT	DOV	POC	MCH	IOW	DAY	KEN	NHA	IND	IOW	GLN	MOH	BRI	ROA	DAR	RCH	CHI	KEN	DOV; 34						111th	0^{1}	
2017	RSS Racing	93	Chevy																													CLT; 39	KAN; 39	TEX; 33	PHO; 40	HOM	111th	0^{1}	
2018	NXT Motorsports	54	Toyota	DAY; 38	ATL	LVS	PHO	CAL	TEX	BRI	RCH	TAL	DOV	CLT	POC	MCH	IOW	CHI	DAY	KEN	NHA	IOW	GLN	MOH	BRI	ROA	DAR	IND	LVS	RCH	ROV	DOV	KAN	TEX	PHO	HOM	108th	0^{1}	
2019	SS-Green Light Racing	08	Chevy	DAY; 34	ATL; 16	LVS; 12	PHO; 16	CAL; 16	TEX; 21	BRI; 15	RCH; 17	TAL; 2	DOV; 20	CLT; 14	POC; 20	MCH; 16	IOW; 14	CHI; 14	DAY; 8	KEN; 15	NHA; 17	IOW; 14	GLN; 15	MOH; 14	BRI; 6	ROA; 29	DAR; 15	IND; 13	LVS; 7	RCH; 22	ROV; 29	DOV; 18	KAN; 17	TEX; 13	PHO; 12	HOM; 17	13th	713	
2020	SS-Green Light Racing	07	Chevy	DAY	LVS	CAL	PHO	DAR	CLT	BRI	ATL	HOM	HOM	TAL; 8	POC	IRC	KEN	KEN	TEX	KAN	ROA	DRC	DOV	DOV	DAY; 2	DAR	RCH	RCH	BRI; 18	LVS; 24	TAL				MAR; 35	PHO	74th	0^{1}	
2020	Mike Harmon Racing	74	Chevy																													ROV; 28	KAN	TEX			74th	0^{1}	
2021	Jimmy Means Racing	52	Chevy	DAY; 34	DRC; 21	HOM; 28	LVS; 27	PHO; 27	ATL; 36	MAR; 21	TAL; 34	DAR; 38	DOV; 31	COA; 27	CLT; DNQ	MOH; 17	TEX; 38	NSH; DNQ	POC	ROA; DNQ	ATL; 35	NHA	GLN	IRC; DNQ	MCH; 27	DAY	DAR; 40	RCH	BRI; 18	LVS	TAL						34th	140	
2021	Mike Harmon Racing	74	Chevy																													ROV; 40	TEX	KAN; 39	MAR	PHO	34th	140	
2022	Mike Harmon Racing	47	Chevy	DAY; DNQ	CAL	LVS	PHO	ATL	COA	RCH	MAR	TAL; 21	DOV	DAR	TEX	CLT																ROV; DNQ	LVS	HOM	MAR	PHO	62nd	17	
2022	JD Motorsports	6	Chevy														PIR; 36	NSH	ROA	ATL	NHA	POC	IRC	MCH	GLN	DAY	DAR	KAN	BRI	TEX	TAL						62nd	17	
2023	SS-Green Light Racing	08	Chevy	DAY; 20				ATL; 20	COA			TAL; 8															DAY; 9	DAR	KAN	BRI	TEX	ROV					37th	132	
2023	SS-Green Light Racing	08	Ford		CAL; 38	LVS; 32	PHO; 37			RCH; 35	MAR; 23		DOV; 27	DAR; 29	CLT	PIR	SON	NSH	CSC	ATL	NHA	POC	ROA	MCH	IRC	GLN											37th	132	
2023	SS-Green Light Racing	07	Chevy																														LVS; DNQ	HOM	MAR	PHO	37th	132	
2026	Mike Harmon Racing	74	Chevy	DAY	ATL	COA	PHO	LVS	DAR	MAR	CAR	BRI; 28	KAN	TAL	TEX	GLN	DOV	CLT	NSH	POC	COR	SON	CHI	ATL	IND	IOW	DAY	DAR	GTW	BRI	LVS	CLT	PHO	TAL	MAR	HOM	55th	9	

==== Gander RV & Outdoors Truck Series ====
NASCAR Gander RV & Outdoors Truck Series results
Year	Team	No.	Make	1	2	3	4	5	6	7	8	9	10	11	12	13	14	15	16	17	18	19	20	21	22	23	NGTC	Pts	Ref
2014	NTS Motorsports	20	Chevy	DAY	MAR; 19	KAN	CLT	DOV; 21	TEX	GTW; 20	KEN	IOW	ELD; 20	POC	MCH	BRI; 23	MSP; 4	CHI	NHA; 16	LVS	TAL	MAR; 14	TEX	PHO; 17	HOM		26th	243	
2015	Red Horse Racing	7	Toyota	DAY	ATL	MAR; 17	KAN	CLT	DOV	TEX	GTW	IOW	KEN	ELD	POC	MCH	BRI										34th	118	
2015	Kyle Busch Motorsports	54	Toyota															MSP; 11	CHI	NHA; 10	LVS	TAL	MAR; 21	TEX	PHO	HOM	34th	118	
2017	Premium Motorsports	15	Chevy	DAY	ATL	MAR	KAN	CLT	DOV	TEX	GTW	IOW	KEN	ELD	POC	MCH	BRI	MSP	CHI; 25	NHA; 25	LVS	TAL	MAR; 31	TEX; 27	PHO	HOM	95th	0^{1}	
2018	Beaver Motorsports	50	Chevy	DAY	ATL	LVS	MAR	DOV	KAN	CLT	TEX	IOW	GTW	CHI	KEN	ELD	POC	MCH	BRI; DNQ	MSP	LVS	TAL	MAR	TEX	PHO	HOM	116th	0^{1}	
2020	Reaume Brothers Racing	33	Toyota	DAY	LVS	CLT	ATL; 34	HOM; 26	POC	KEN	TEX	KAN	KAN	MCH	DRC	DOV	GTW	DAR	RCH	BRI	LVS	TAL	KAN	TEX	MAR	PHO	69th	16	

==== K&N Pro Series East ====
NASCAR K&N Pro Series East results
Year	Team	No.	Make	1	2	3	4	5	6	7	8	9	10	11	12	13	14	15	16	NKNPSEC	Pts	Ref
2013	SS-Green Light Racing	20	Toyota	BRI; 6	GRE; 10	FIF; 2	**RCH**; 24*	BGS; 8	IOW; 6	LGY; 17	COL; 14	IOW; 23	VIR; 5	GRE; 3	NHA; 8	DOV; 21	RAL; 15			7th	456	
2014	NTS Motorsports	20	Chevy	NSM; 7	DAY; 7	BRI; 2	GRE; 11	RCH; 11	IOW; 17	BGS; 6	**FIF**; 5*	LGY; 18	NHA; 8*	COL; 15	IOW; 11	GLN; 18	VIR; 4	GRE; 3	DOV; 8	3rd	562	
2015	NTS Motorsports	20	Chevy	NSM; 3																17th	282	
2015	Precision Performance Motorsports	12	Toyota		GRE; 2	BRI; 11	IOW; 21	BGS; 5	LGY; 4	COL; 17	NHA; 7	IOW	GLN	MOT	VIR	RCH	DOV			17th	282	

==== K&N Pro Series West ====
NASCAR K&N Pro Series West results
Year	Team	No.	Make	1	2	3	4	5	6	7	8	9	10	11	12	13	14	15	NKNPSWC	Pts	Ref
2013	SS-Green Light Racing	02	Toyota	PHO; 6	S99	BIR	IOW	L44	SON	CNS	IOW	EVG	SPO	MMP	SMP	AAS	**KCR**; 21	PHO; 1	27th	109	
2014	NTS Motorsports	02	Chevy	PHO; 29	IRW	S99	IOW	KCR	SON	SLS	CNS	IOW	EVG	KCR	MMP	AAS			41st	57	
2014	NTS Motorsports	20	Chevy														PHO; 2		41st	57	

=== ARCA Racing Series ===
(key) (Bold – Pole position awarded by qualifying time. Italics – Pole position earned by points standings or practice time. * – Most laps led.)

ARCA Racing Series results
Year	Team	No.	Make	1	2	3	4	5	6	7	8	9	10	11	12	13	14	15	16	17	18	19	20	ARSC	Pts	Ref
2016	Lira Motorsports	38	Ford	DAY; 9	NSH	SLM	TAL	TOL	NJE	POC	MCH	MAD	WIN	IOW	IRP	POC	BLN	ISF	DSF	SLM	CHI	KEN	KAN	100th	185	
