= 2018 Auto Club 400 =

Race details
- Race 5 of 36 in the 2018 Monster Energy NASCAR Cup Series
- 2018 Auto Club 400 program cover
- Date: March 18, 2018
- Location: Auto Club Speedway in Fontana, California
- Course: Permanent racing facility
- Course length: 2 miles (3.22 km)
- Distance: 200 laps, 400 mi (640 km)
- Average speed: 147.526 miles per hour (237.420 km/h)

Pole position
Driver	Martin Truex Jr.	Furniture Row Racing
- Time: 38.592

Most laps led
Driver	Martin Truex Jr.	Furniture Row Racing
- Laps: 125

Winner
No. 78	Martin Truex Jr.	Furniture Row Racing

Television in the United States
- Network: Fox
- Announcers: Mike Joy, Jeff Gordon and Darrell Waltrip
- Nielsen ratings: 2.4 (Overnight)

Radio in the United States
- Radio: MRN
- Booth announcers: Joe Moore, Jeff Striegle and Rusty Wallace
- Turn announcers: Dan Hubbard (1 & 2) and Kurt Becker (3 & 4)

The 2018 Auto Club 400 was a Monster Energy NASCAR Cup Series race that was held on March 18, 2018, at Auto Club Speedway in Fontana, California. Contested over 200 laps on the two-mile (3.2 km) D-shaped oval, it was the fifth race of the 2018 Monster Energy NASCAR Cup Series season.

== Report ==
=== Background ===
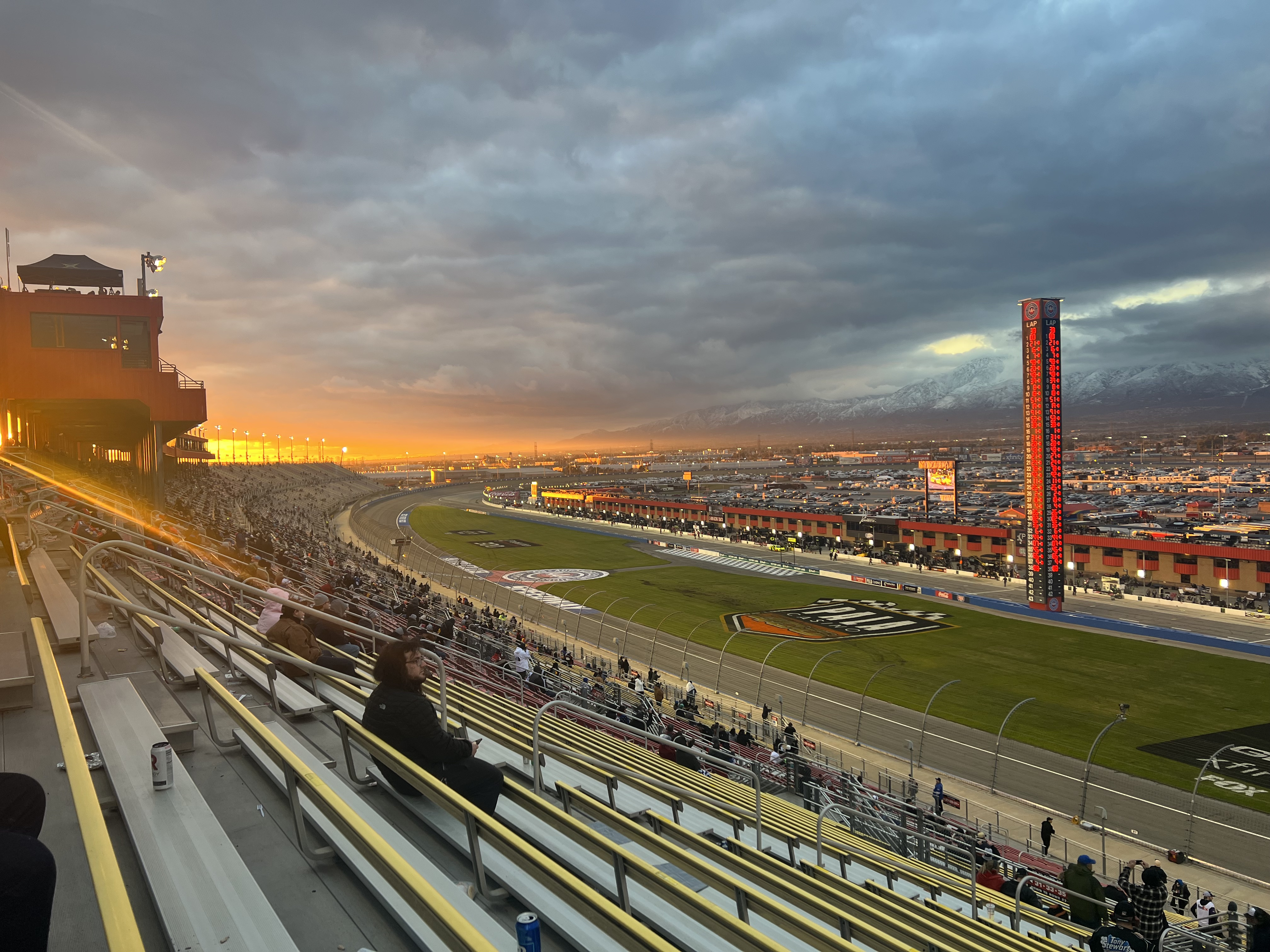
Auto Club Speedway, the track where the race was held.

Auto Club Speedway (previously California Speedway) was a two-mile (3.2 km), low-banked, D-shaped oval superspeedway in Fontana, California which hosted NASCAR racing annually from 1997 to 2023. It was also used for open wheel racing events. The racetrack was located near the former locations of Ontario Motor Speedway and Riverside International Raceway. The track was owned and operated by International Speedway Corporation and was the only track owned by ISC to have its naming rights sold. The speedway was served by the nearby Interstate 10 and Interstate 15 freeways as well as a Metrolink station located behind the backstretch.

==== Entry list ====
No.	Driver	Team	Manufacturer
00	Jeffrey Earnhardt	StarCom Racing	Chevrolet
1	Jamie McMurray	Chip Ganassi Racing	Chevrolet
2	Brad Keselowski	Team Penske	Ford
3	Austin Dillon	Richard Childress Racing	Chevrolet
4	Kevin Harvick	Stewart–Haas Racing	Ford
6	Trevor Bayne	Roush Fenway Racing	Ford
9	Chase Elliott	Hendrick Motorsports	Chevrolet
10	Aric Almirola	Stewart–Haas Racing	Ford
11	Denny Hamlin	Joe Gibbs Racing	Toyota
12	Ryan Blaney	Team Penske	Ford
13	Ty Dillon	Germain Racing	Chevrolet
14	Clint Bowyer	Stewart–Haas Racing	Ford
15	Ross Chastain (i)	Premium Motorsports	Chevrolet
17	Ricky Stenhouse Jr.	Roush Fenway Racing	Ford
18	Kyle Busch	Joe Gibbs Racing	Toyota
19	Daniel Suárez	Joe Gibbs Racing	Toyota
20	Erik Jones	Joe Gibbs Racing	Toyota
21	Paul Menard	Wood Brothers Racing	Ford
22	Joey Logano	Team Penske	Ford
23	Gray Gaulding	BK Racing	Toyota
24	William Byron (R)	Hendrick Motorsports	Chevrolet
31	Ryan Newman	Richard Childress Racing	Chevrolet
32	Matt DiBenedetto	Go Fas Racing	Ford
34	Michael McDowell	Front Row Motorsports	Ford
37	Chris Buescher	JTG Daugherty Racing	Chevrolet
38	David Ragan	Front Row Motorsports	Ford
41	Kurt Busch	Stewart–Haas Racing	Ford
42	Kyle Larson	Chip Ganassi Racing	Chevrolet
43	Bubba Wallace (R)	Richard Petty Motorsports	Chevrolet
47	A. J. Allmendinger	JTG Daugherty Racing	Chevrolet
48	Jimmie Johnson	Hendrick Motorsports	Chevrolet
51	Timmy Hill (i)	Rick Ware Racing	Toyota
55	Reed Sorenson	Premium Motorsports	Chevrolet
72	Cole Whitt	TriStar Motorsports	Chevrolet
78	Martin Truex Jr.	Furniture Row Racing	Toyota
88	Alex Bowman	Hendrick Motorsports	Chevrolet
95	Kasey Kahne	Leavine Family Racing	Chevrolet
Official entry list

== First practice ==
Kevin Harvick was the fastest in the first practice session with a time of 38.082 seconds and a speed of 189.066 mph (304.272 km/h).

Pos	No.	Driver	Team	Manufacturer	Time	Speed
1	4	Kevin Harvick	Stewart–Haas Racing	Ford	38.082	189.066
2	14	Clint Bowyer	Stewart–Haas Racing	Ford	38.255	188.211
3	10	Aric Almirola	Stewart–Haas Racing	Ford	38.311	187.936
Official first practice results

== Qualifying ==
Martin Truex Jr. scored the pole for the race with a time of 38.592 and a speed of 186.567 mph (300.250 km/h).

=== Qualifying results ===
Pos	No.	Driver	Team	Manufacturer	R1	R2	R3
1	78	Martin Truex Jr.	Furniture Row Racing	Toyota	38.390	38.686	38.592
2	18	Kyle Busch	Joe Gibbs Racing	Toyota	38.847	38.411	38.619
3	42	Kyle Larson	Chip Ganassi Racing	Chevrolet	38.193	38.491	38.683
4	20	Erik Jones	Joe Gibbs Racing	Toyota	38.555	38.683	38.700
5	3	Austin Dillon	Richard Childress Racing	Chevrolet	38.690	38.749	38.770
6	22	Joey Logano	Team Penske	Ford	38.622	38.614	38.798
7	41	Kurt Busch	Stewart–Haas Racing	Ford	38.706	38.533	38.880
8	12	Ryan Blaney	Team Penske	Ford	38.602	38.582	38.903
9	31	Ryan Newman	Richard Childress Racing	Chevrolet	38.616	38.820	38.951
10	4	Kevin Harvick	Stewart–Haas Racing	Ford	38.147	38.355	39.038
11	2	Brad Keselowski	Team Penske	Ford	38.583	38.892	39.054
12	37	Chris Buescher	JTG Daugherty Racing	Chevrolet	38.895	38.677	39.058
13	6	Trevor Bayne	Roush Fenway Racing	Ford	39.034	38.973	—
14	21	Paul Menard	Wood Brothers Racing	Ford	38.429	39.004	—
15	1	Jamie McMurray	Chip Ganassi Racing	Chevrolet	39.093	39.106	—
16	17	Ricky Stenhouse Jr.	Roush Fenway Racing	Ford	39.514	39.169	—
17	13	Ty Dillon	Germain Racing	Chevrolet	39.091	39.198	—
18	32	Matt DiBenedetto	Go Fas Racing	Ford	39.088	39.259	—
19	43	Bubba Wallace (R)	Richard Petty Motorsports	Chevrolet	38.965	39.377	—
20	23	Gray Gaulding	BK Racing	Toyota	40.549	41.105	—
21	38	David Ragan	Front Row Motorsports	Ford	39.158	0.000	—
22	34	Michael McDowell	Front Row Motorsports	Ford	39.215	0.000	—
23	00	Jeffrey Earnhardt	StarCom Racing	Chevrolet	40.899	0.000	—
24	55	Reed Sorenson	Premium Motorsports	Chevrolet	53.838	0.000	—
25	11	Denny Hamlin	Joe Gibbs Racing	Toyota	0.000	—	—
26	14	Clint Bowyer	Stewart–Haas Racing	Ford	0.000	—	—
27	10	Aric Almirola	Stewart–Haas Racing	Ford	0.000	—	—
28	88	Alex Bowman	Hendrick Motorsports	Chevrolet	0.000	—	—
29	24	William Byron (R)	Hendrick Motorsports	Chevrolet	0.000	—	—
30	19	Daniel Suárez	Joe Gibbs Racing	Toyota	0.000	—	—
31	9	Chase Elliott	Hendrick Motorsports	Chevrolet	0.000	—	—
32	47	A. J. Allmendinger	JTG Daugherty Racing	Chevrolet	0.000	—	—
33	48	Jimmie Johnson	Hendrick Motorsports	Chevrolet	0.000	—	—
34	95	Kasey Kahne	Leavine Family Racing	Chevrolet	0.000	—	—
35	51	Timmy Hill (i)	Rick Ware Racing	Toyota	0.000	—	—
36	15	Ross Chastain (i)	Premium Motorsports	Chevrolet	0.000	—	—
37	72	Cole Whitt	TriStar Motorsports	Chevrolet	0.000	—	—
Official qualifying results

== Practice (post-qualifying) ==
=== Second practice ===
Kevin Harvick was the fastest in the second practice session with a time of 38.694 seconds and a speed of 186.075 mph (299.459 km/h).

Pos	No.	Driver	Team	Manufacturer	Time	Speed
1	4	Kevin Harvick	Stewart–Haas Racing	Ford	38.694	186.075
2	41	Kurt Busch	Stewart–Haas Racing	Ford	39.039	184.431
3	9	Chase Elliott	Hendrick Motorsports	Chevrolet	39.126	184.021
Official second practice results

=== Final practice ===
Kyle Busch was the fastest in the final practice session with a time of 38.779 seconds and a speed of 185.668 mph (298.804 km/h).

Pos	No.	Driver	Team	Manufacturer	Time	Speed
1	18	Kyle Busch	Joe Gibbs Racing	Toyota	38.779	185.668
2	78	Martin Truex Jr.	Furniture Row Racing	Toyota	38.852	185.319
3	48	Jimmie Johnson	Hendrick Motorsports	Chevrolet	39.019	184.525
Official final practice results

== Race results ==
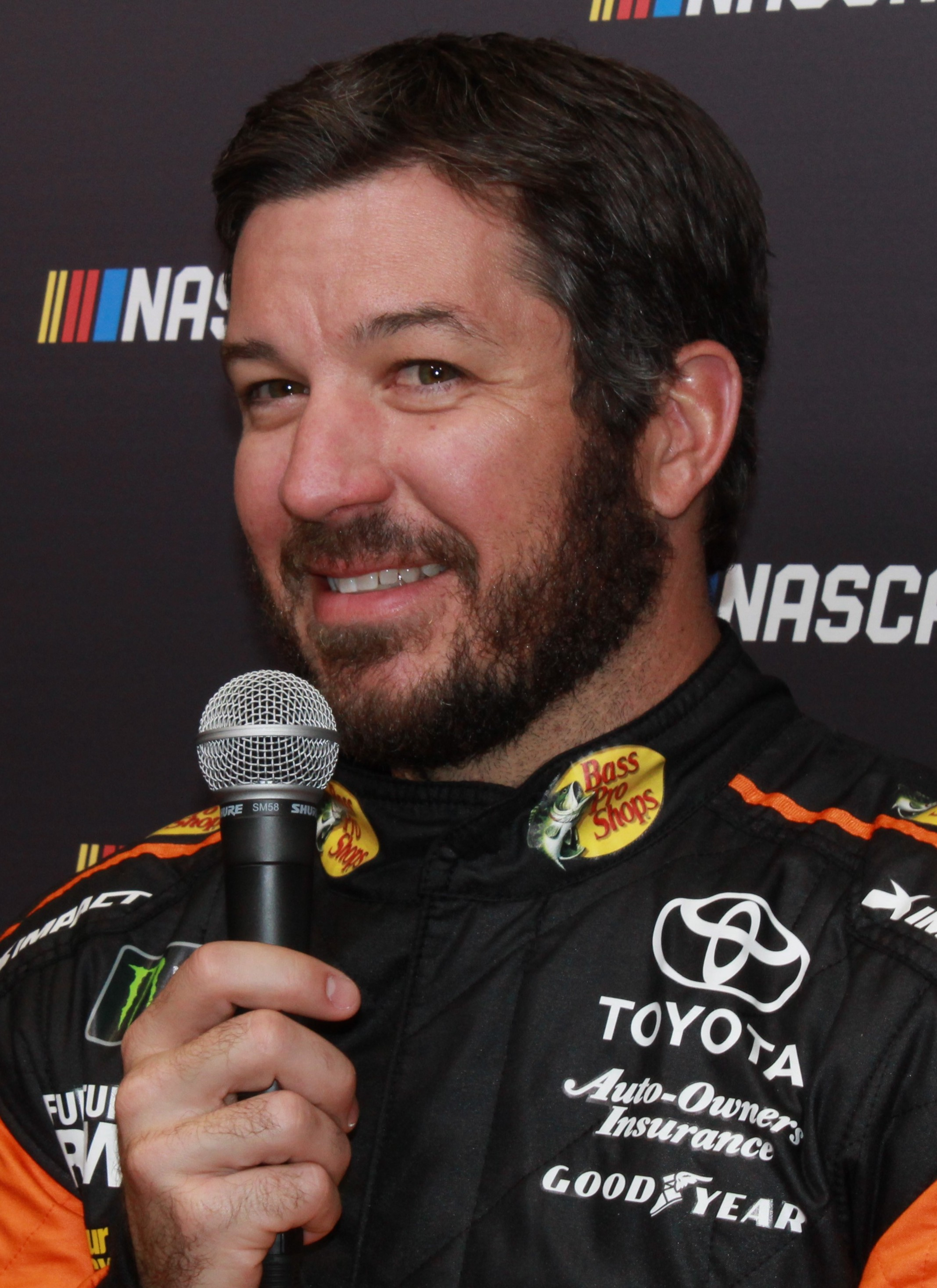
Martin Truex Jr. swept all three stages and won the race from the pole position.

=== Stage Results ===
Stage 1 Laps: 60

Pos	No	Driver	Team	Manufacturer	Points
1	78	Martin Truex Jr.	Furniture Row Racing	Toyota	10
2	18	Kyle Busch	Joe Gibbs Racing	Toyota	9
3	22	Joey Logano	Team Penske	Ford	8
4	2	Brad Keselowski	Team Penske	Ford	7
5	48	Jimmie Johnson	Hendrick Motorsports	Chevrolet	6
6	42	Kyle Larson	Chip Ganassi Racing	Chevrolet	5
7	41	Kurt Busch	Stewart–Haas Racing	Ford	4
8	20	Erik Jones	Joe Gibbs Racing	Toyota	3
9	14	Clint Bowyer	Stewart–Haas Racing	Ford	2
10	11	Denny Hamlin	Joe Gibbs Racing	Toyota	1
Official stage one results

Stage 2 Laps: 60

Pos	No	Driver	Team	Manufacturer	Points
1	78	Martin Truex Jr.	Furniture Row Racing	Toyota	10
2	2	Brad Keselowski	Team Penske	Ford	9
3	18	Kyle Busch	Joe Gibbs Racing	Toyota	8
4	11	Denny Hamlin	Joe Gibbs Racing	Toyota	7
5	20	Erik Jones	Joe Gibbs Racing	Toyota	6
6	22	Joey Logano	Team Penske	Ford	5
7	48	Jimmie Johnson	Hendrick Motorsports	Chevrolet	4
8	42	Kyle Larson	Chip Ganassi Racing	Chevrolet	3
9	14	Clint Bowyer	Stewart–Haas Racing	Ford	2
10	24	William Byron (R)	Hendrick Motorsports	Chevrolet	1
Official stage two results

=== Final Stage Results ===
Stage 3 Laps: 80

Pos	Grid	No	Driver	Team	Manufacturer	Laps	Points
1	1	78	Martin Truex Jr.	Furniture Row Racing	Toyota	200	60
2	3	42	Kyle Larson	Chip Ganassi Racing	Chevrolet	200	43
3	2	18	Kyle Busch	Joe Gibbs Racing	Toyota	200	51
4	11	2	Brad Keselowski	Team Penske	Ford	200	49
5	6	22	Joey Logano	Team Penske	Ford	200	45
6	25	11	Denny Hamlin	Joe Gibbs Racing	Toyota	200	39
7	4	20	Erik Jones	Joe Gibbs Racing	Toyota	200	39
8	8	12	Ryan Blaney	Team Penske	Ford	200	29
9	33	48	Jimmie Johnson	Hendrick Motorsports	Chevrolet	200	38
10	5	3	Austin Dillon	Richard Childress Racing	Chevrolet	200	27
11	26	14	Clint Bowyer	Stewart–Haas Racing	Ford	199	30
12	27	10	Aric Almirola	Stewart–Haas Racing	Ford	199	25
13	28	88	Alex Bowman	Hendrick Motorsports	Chevrolet	199	24
14	7	41	Kurt Busch	Stewart–Haas Racing	Ford	199	27
15	29	24	William Byron (R)	Hendrick Motorsports	Chevrolet	199	23
16	31	9	Chase Elliott	Hendrick Motorsports	Chevrolet	199	21
17	15	1	Jamie McMurray	Chip Ganassi Racing	Chevrolet	199	20
18	16	17	Ricky Stenhouse Jr.	Roush Fenway Racing	Ford	199	19
19	14	21	Paul Menard	Wood Brothers Racing	Ford	199	18
20	19	43	Bubba Wallace (R)	Richard Petty Motorsports	Chevrolet	199	17
21	9	31	Ryan Newman	Richard Childress Racing	Chevrolet	199	16
22	32	47	A. J. Allmendinger	JTG Daugherty Racing	Chevrolet	199	15
23	30	19	Daniel Suárez	Joe Gibbs Racing	Toyota	199	14
24	34	95	Kasey Kahne	Leavine Family Racing	Chevrolet	199	13
25	21	38	David Ragan	Front Row Motorsports	Ford	199	12
26	22	34	Michael McDowell	Front Row Motorsports	Ford	199	11
27	17	13	Ty Dillon	Germain Racing	Chevrolet	198	10
28	37	72	Cole Whitt	TriStar Motorsports	Chevrolet	198	9
29	36	15	Ross Chastain (i)	Premium Motorsports	Chevrolet	198	0
30	12	37	Chris Buescher	JTG Daugherty Racing	Chevrolet	197	7
31	18	32	Matt DiBenedetto	Go Fas Racing	Ford	196	6
32	20	23	Gray Gaulding	BK Racing	Toyota	194	5
33	35	51	Timmy Hill (i)	Rick Ware Racing	Toyota	193	0
34	24	55	Reed Sorenson	Premium Motorsports	Chevrolet	193	3
35	10	4	Kevin Harvick	Stewart–Haas Racing	Ford	191	2
36	23	00	Jeffrey Earnhardt	StarCom Racing	Chevrolet	189	1
37	13	6	Trevor Bayne	Roush Fenway Racing	Ford	108	1
Official race results

=== Race statistics ===
- Lead changes: 7 among different drivers
- Cautions/Laps: 5 for 21
- Red flags: 0
- Time of race: 2 hours, 42 minutes and 41 seconds
- Average speed: 147.526 miles per hour (237.420 km/h)

== Media ==
=== Television ===
The race was the 18th race Fox Sports covered at the Auto Club Speedway. Mike Joy, three-time Auto Club winner Jeff Gordon and Darrell Waltrip had call in the booth for the race. Jamie Little, Vince Welch and Matt Yocum handled the pit road duties for the television side.

Fox
Booth announcers	Pit reporters
Lap-by-lap: Mike Joy; Color-commentator: Jeff Gordon; Color commentator: Darrell Waltrip	Jamie Little; Vince Welch; Matt Yocum

=== Radio ===
MRN had the radio call for the race which was also simulcasted on Sirius XM NASCAR Radio. Joe Moore, Jeff Striegle and 2001 race winner Rusty Wallace called the race from the booth when the field was racing down the front stretch. Dan Hubbard called race from a billboard outside turn 2 when the field was racing through turns 1 and 2. Kurt Becker called the race from a billboard outside turn 3 when the field was racing through turns 3 and 4. Alex Hayden, Winston Kelley and Steve Post worked pit road for MRN.

MRN
Booth announcers	Turn announcers	Pit reporters
Lead announcer: Joe Moore; Announcer: Jeff Striegle; Announcer: Rusty Wallace	Turns 1 & 2: Dan Hubbard; Turns 3 & 4: Kurt Becker	Alex Hayden; Winston Kelley; Steve Post

== Standings after the race ==
Drivers' Championship standings

	Pos	Driver	Points
2	1	Martin Truex Jr.	216
	2	Kyle Busch	207 (–9)
1	3	Joey Logano	197 (–19)
3	4	Brad Keselowski	183 (–33)
	5	Ryan Blaney	181 (–35)
	6	Denny Hamlin	176 (–40)
1	7	Kyle Larson	174 (–42)
7	8	Kevin Harvick	170 (–46)
	9	Clint Bowyer	155 (–61)
	10	Aric Almirola	148 (–68)
	11	Kurt Busch	144 (–72)
	12	Austin Dillon	141 (–75)
2	13	Erik Jones	132 (–84)
1	14	Ryan Newman	117 (–99)
1	15	Paul Menard	115 (–101)
1	16	Alex Bowman	115 (–101)
Official driver's standings

Manufacturers' Championship standings

Pos	Manufacturer	Points
1	Ford	178
2	Toyota	177 (–1)
3	Chevrolet	163 (–15)
Official manufacturers' standings

- Note: Only the first 16 positions are included for the driver standings.

Previous race: 2018 TicketGuardian 500	Monster Energy NASCAR Cup Series; 2018 season	Next race: 2018 STP 500
