= 2018 O'Reilly Auto Parts 500 =

Race details
- Race 7 of 36 in the 2018 Monster Energy NASCAR Cup Series
- Date: April 8, 2018
- Location: Texas Motor Speedway in Fort Worth, Texas
- Course: Permanent racing facility
- Course length: 1.5 miles (2.4 km)
- Distance: 334 laps, 501 mi (801.6 km)
- Average speed: 141.714 miles per hour (228.067 km/h)

Pole position
Driver	Kurt Busch	Stewart–Haas Racing
- Time: 27.360

Most laps led
Driver	Kyle Busch	Joe Gibbs Racing
- Laps: 116

Winner
No. 18	Kyle Busch	Joe Gibbs Racing

Television in the United States
- Network: FS1
- Announcers: Mike Joy, Jeff Gordon and Darrell Waltrip
- Nielsen ratings: 1.7/1.7 (Overnight)

Radio in the United States
- Radio: PRN
- Booth announcers: Doug Rice, Mark Garrow and Wendy Venturini
- Turn announcers: Rob Albright (1 & 2) and Pat Patterson (3 & 4)

The 2018 O'Reilly Auto Parts 500 was a Monster Energy NASCAR Cup Series race held on April 8, 2018, at Texas Motor Speedway in Fort Worth, Texas. Contested over 334 laps on the 1.5-mile (2.4 km) intermediate quad-oval, it was the seventh race of the 2018 Monster Energy NASCAR Cup Series season.

== Report ==
=== Background ===
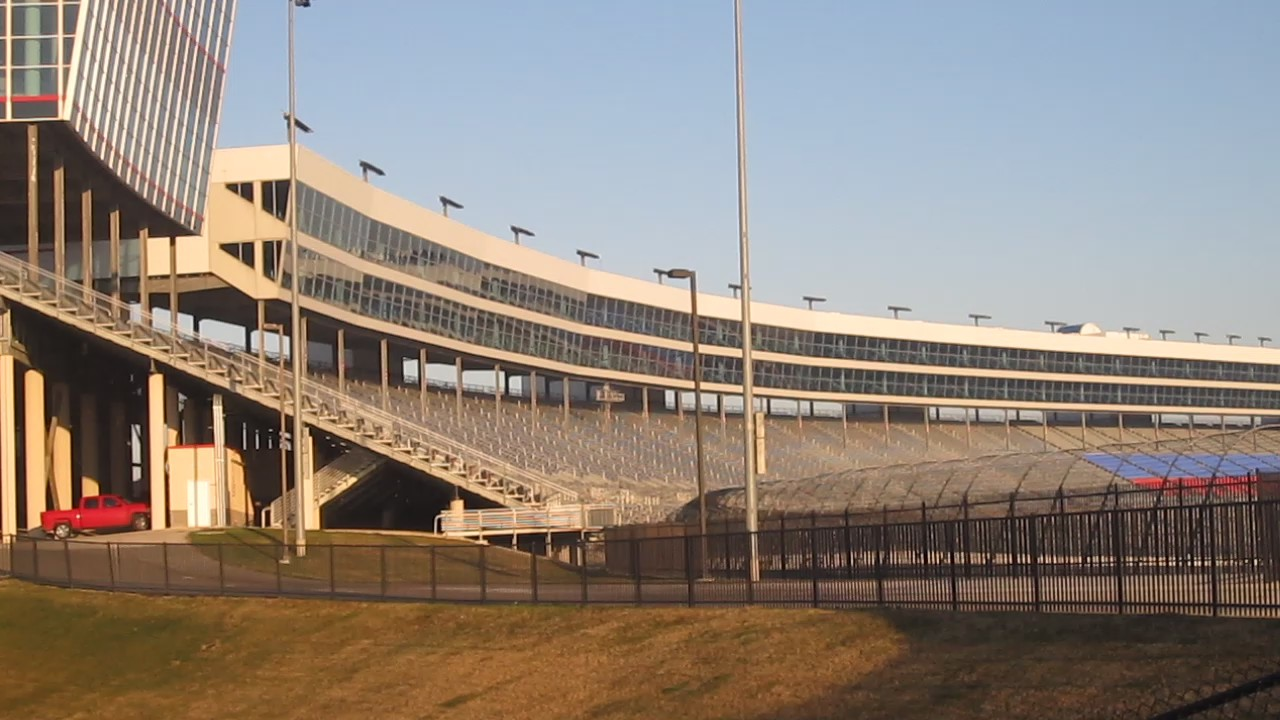
Texas Motor Speedway, the track where the race was held.

Texas Motor Speedway is a speedway located in the northernmost portion of the U.S. city of Fort Worth, Texas – the portion located in Denton County, Texas. The track measures 1.5 miles (2.4 km) around and is banked 24 degrees in the turns, and is of the oval design, where the front straightaway juts outward slightly. The track layout is similar to Atlanta Motor Speedway and Charlotte Motor Speedway (formerly Lowe's Motor Speedway). The track is owned by Speedway Motorsports, Inc., the same company that owns Atlanta and Charlotte Motor Speedways, as well as the short-track Bristol Motor Speedway.

==== Entry list ====
No.	Driver	Team	Manufacturer
00	Landon Cassill	StarCom Racing	Chevrolet
1	Jamie McMurray	Chip Ganassi Racing	Chevrolet
2	Brad Keselowski	Team Penske	Ford
3	Austin Dillon	Richard Childress Racing	Chevrolet
4	Kevin Harvick	Stewart–Haas Racing	Ford
6	Trevor Bayne	Roush Fenway Racing	Ford
9	Chase Elliott	Hendrick Motorsports	Chevrolet
10	Aric Almirola	Stewart–Haas Racing	Ford
11	Denny Hamlin	Joe Gibbs Racing	Toyota
12	Ryan Blaney	Team Penske	Ford
13	Ty Dillon	Germain Racing	Chevrolet
14	Clint Bowyer	Stewart–Haas Racing	Ford
15	Ross Chastain (i)	Premium Motorsports	Chevrolet
17	Ricky Stenhouse Jr.	Roush Fenway Racing	Ford
18	Kyle Busch	Joe Gibbs Racing	Toyota
19	Daniel Suárez	Joe Gibbs Racing	Toyota
20	Erik Jones	Joe Gibbs Racing	Toyota
21	Paul Menard	Wood Brothers Racing	Ford
22	Joey Logano	Team Penske	Ford
23	Gray Gaulding	BK Racing	Toyota
24	William Byron (R)	Hendrick Motorsports	Chevrolet
31	Ryan Newman	Richard Childress Racing	Chevrolet
32	Matt DiBenedetto	Go Fas Racing	Ford
34	Michael McDowell	Front Row Motorsports	Ford
37	Chris Buescher	JTG Daugherty Racing	Chevrolet
38	David Ragan	Front Row Motorsports	Ford
41	Kurt Busch	Stewart–Haas Racing	Ford
42	Kyle Larson	Chip Ganassi Racing	Chevrolet
43	Bubba Wallace (R)	Richard Petty Motorsports	Chevrolet
47	A. J. Allmendinger	JTG Daugherty Racing	Chevrolet
48	Jimmie Johnson	Hendrick Motorsports	Chevrolet
51	Harrison Rhodes	Rick Ware Racing	Chevrolet
55	Reed Sorenson	Premium Motorsports	Chevrolet
72	Cole Whitt	TriStar Motorsports	Chevrolet
78	Martin Truex Jr.	Furniture Row Racing	Toyota
88	Alex Bowman	Hendrick Motorsports	Chevrolet
95	Kasey Kahne	Leavine Family Racing	Chevrolet
Official entry list

== First practice ==
Kurt Busch was the fastest in the first practice session with a time of 27.523 seconds and a speed of 196.200 mph (315.753 km/h).

Pos	No.	Driver	Team	Manufacturer	Time	Speed
1	41	Kurt Busch	Stewart–Haas Racing	Ford	27.523	196.200
2	4	Kevin Harvick	Stewart–Haas Racing	Ford	27.559	195.943
3	14	Clint Bowyer	Stewart–Haas Racing	Ford	27.632	195.426
Official first practice results

== Qualifying ==
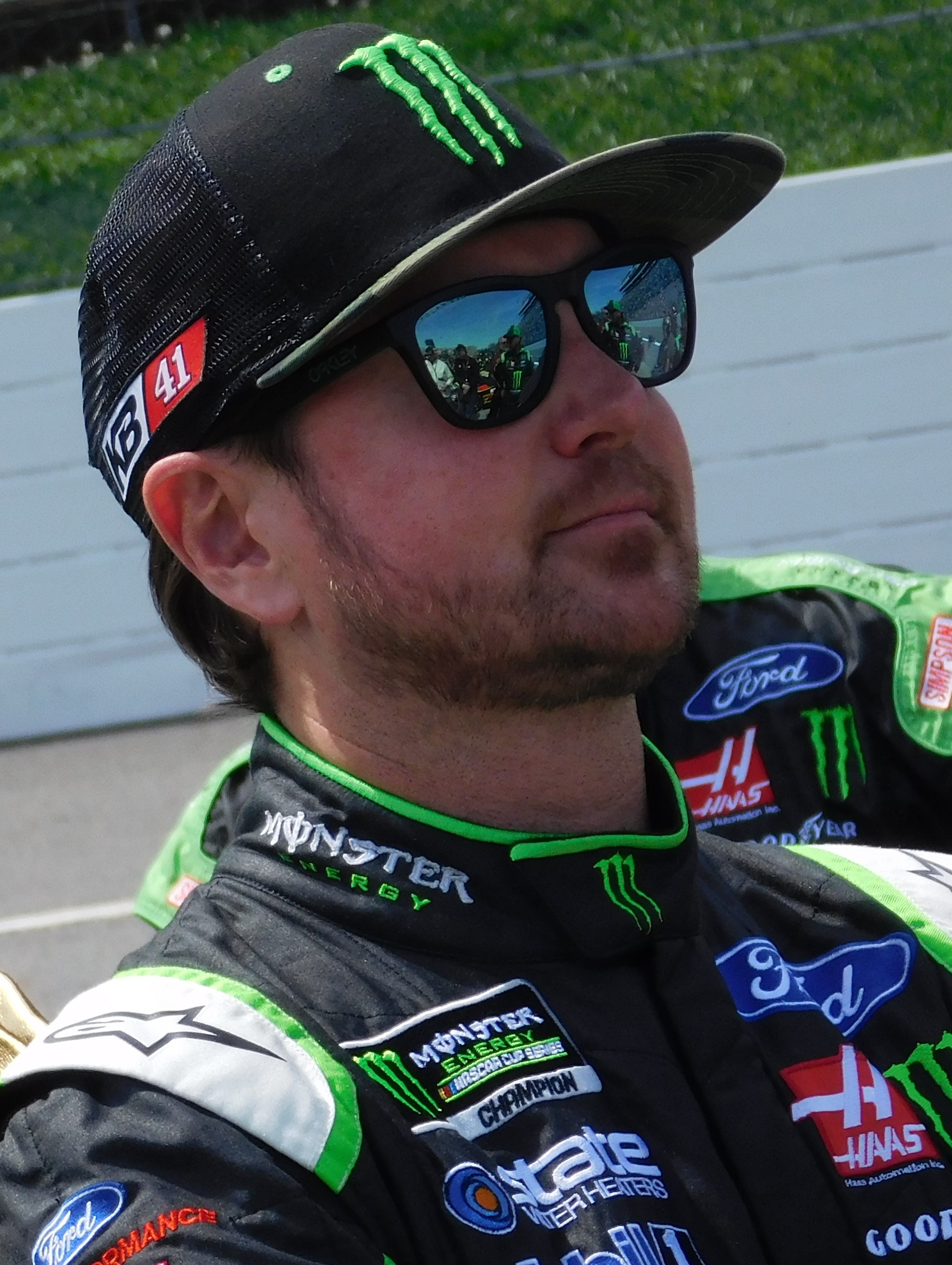
Kurt Busch scored the pole position.

Kurt Busch scored the pole for the race with a time of 27.360 and a speed of 197.368 mph (317.633 km/h) after only one round of qualifying was completed due to lightning in the area.

=== Qualifying results ===
Pos	No.	Driver	Team	Manufacturer	R1
1	41	Kurt Busch	Stewart–Haas Racing	Ford	27.360
2	4	Kevin Harvick	Stewart–Haas Racing	Ford	27.395
3	14	Clint Bowyer	Stewart–Haas Racing	Ford	27.435
4	12	Ryan Blaney	Team Penske	Ford	27.467
5	11	Denny Hamlin	Joe Gibbs Racing	Toyota	27.515
6	78	Martin Truex Jr.	Furniture Row Racing	Toyota	27.554
7	22	Joey Logano	Team Penske	Ford	27.562
8	18	Kyle Busch	Joe Gibbs Racing	Toyota	27.583
9	48	Jimmie Johnson	Hendrick Motorsports	Chevrolet	27.607
10	42	Kyle Larson	Chip Ganassi Racing	Chevrolet	27.688
11	2	Brad Keselowski	Team Penske	Ford	27.689
12	10	Aric Almirola	Stewart–Haas Racing	Ford	27.693
13	6	Trevor Bayne	Roush Fenway Racing	Ford	27.715
14	19	Daniel Suárez	Joe Gibbs Racing	Toyota	27.719
15	43	Bubba Wallace (R)	Richard Petty Motorsports	Chevrolet	27.726
16	88	Alex Bowman	Hendrick Motorsports	Chevrolet	27.729
17	3	Austin Dillon	Richard Childress Racing	Chevrolet	27.757
18	37	Chris Buescher	JTG Daugherty Racing	Chevrolet	27.758
19	21	Paul Menard	Wood Brothers Racing	Ford	27.774
20	9	Chase Elliott	Hendrick Motorsports	Chevrolet	27.789
21	20	Erik Jones	Joe Gibbs Racing	Toyota	27.810
22	47	A. J. Allmendinger	JTG Daugherty Racing	Chevrolet	27.842
23	13	Ty Dillon	Germain Racing	Chevrolet	27.861
24	1	Jamie McMurray	Chip Ganassi Racing	Chevrolet	27.873
25	31	Ryan Newman	Richard Childress Racing	Chevrolet	27.905
26	17	Ricky Stenhouse Jr.	Roush Fenway Racing	Ford	27.913
27	34	Michael McDowell	Front Row Motorsports	Ford	27.919
28	95	Kasey Kahne	Leavine Family Racing	Chevrolet	28.030
29	38	David Ragan	Front Row Motorsports	Ford	28.082
30	32	Matt DiBenedetto	Go Fas Racing	Ford	28.184
31	15	Ross Chastain (i)	Premium Motorsports	Chevrolet	28.325
32	23	Gray Gaulding	BK Racing	Toyota	28.569
33	24	William Byron (R)	Hendrick Motorsports	Chevrolet	28.694
34	72	Cole Whitt	TriStar Motorsports	Chevrolet	28.963
35	00	Landon Cassill	StarCom Racing	Chevrolet	30.276
36	51	Harrison Rhodes	Rick Ware Racing	Chevrolet	32.729
37	55	Reed Sorenson	Premium Motorsports	Chevrolet	0.000
Official qualifying results

== Practice (post-qualifying) ==
=== Second practice ===
Daniel Suárez was the fastest in the second practice session with a time of 27.136 seconds and a speed of 198.998 mph (320.256 km/h).

Pos	No.	Driver	Team	Manufacturer	Time	Speed
1	19	Daniel Suárez	Joe Gibbs Racing	Toyota	27.136	198.998
2	11	Denny Hamlin	Joe Gibbs Racing	Toyota	27.163	198.800
3	24	William Byron	Hendrick Motorsports	Chevrolet	27.171	198.741
Official second practice results

=== Final practice ===
Jimmie Johnson was the fastest in the final practice session with a time of 27.253 seconds and a speed of 198.143 mph (318.880 km/h).

Pos	No.	Driver	Team	Manufacturer	Time	Speed
1	48	Jimmie Johnson	Hendrick Motorsports	Chevrolet	27.253	198.143
2	4	Kevin Harvick	Stewart–Haas Racing	Ford	27.275	197.984
3	19	Daniel Suárez	Joe Gibbs Racing	Toyota	27.303	197.780
Official final practice results

== Race results ==
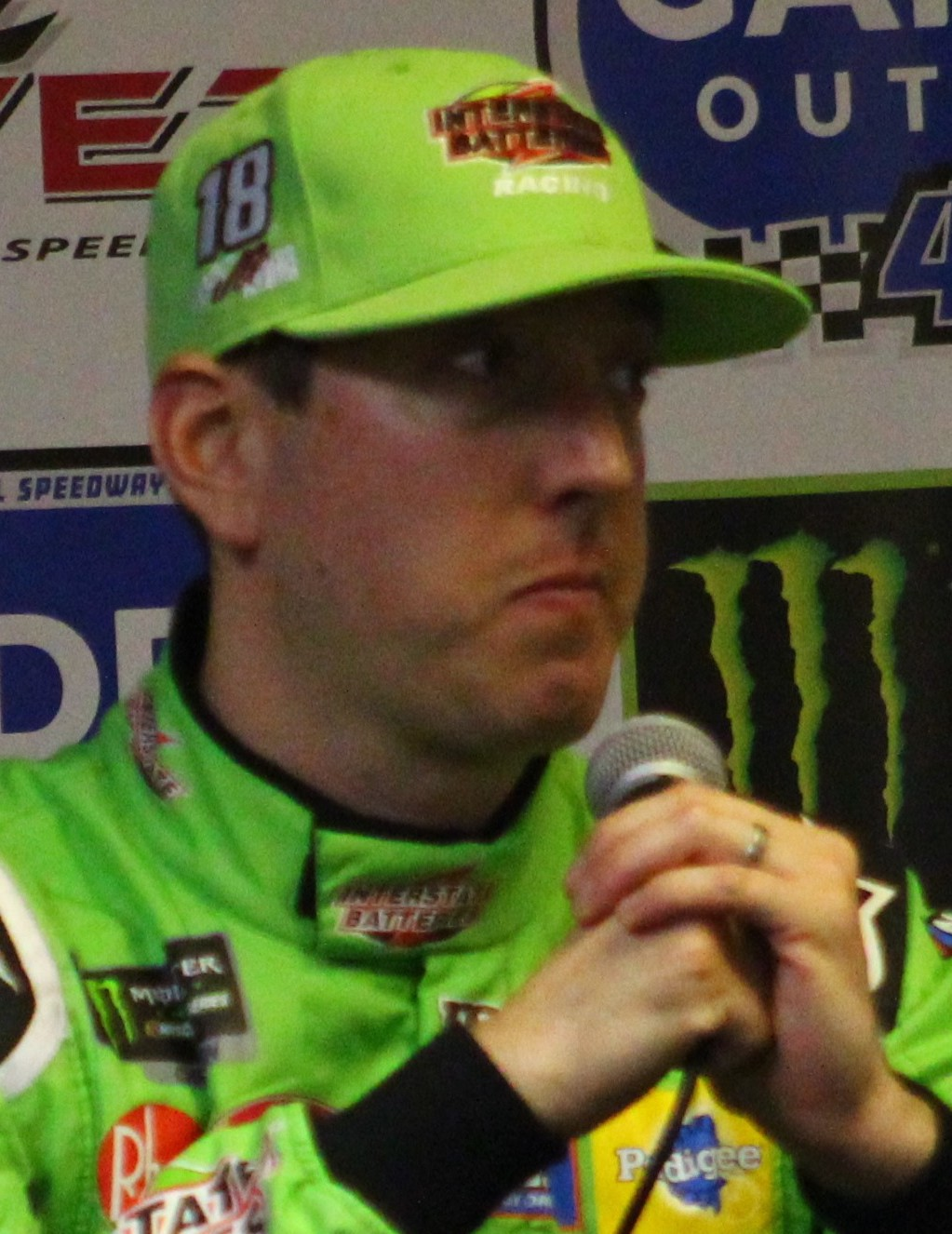
Kyle Busch won the race.

=== Stage Results ===
Stage 1 Laps: 85

Pos	No	Driver	Team	Manufacturer	Points
1	4	Kevin Harvick	Stewart-Hass Racing	Ford	10
2	18	Kyle Busch	Joe Gibbs Racing	Toyota	9
3	41	Kurt Busch	Stewart-Hass Racing	Ford	8
4	22	Joey Logano	Team Penske	Ford	7
5	42	Kyle Larson	Chip Ganassi Racing	Chevrolet	6
6	14	Clint Bowyer	Stewart-Hass Racing	Ford	5
7	1	Jamie McMurray	Chip Ganassi Racing	Chevrolet	4
8	2	Brad Keselowski	Team Penske	Ford	3
9	9	Chase Elliott	Hendrick Motorsports	Chevrolet	2
10	20	Erik Jones	Joe Gibbs Racing	Toyota	1
Official stage one results

Stage 2 Laps: 85

Pos	No	Driver	Team	Manufacturer	Points
1	18	Kyle Busch	Joe Gibbs Racing	Toyota	10
2	41	Kurt Busch	Stewart-Hass Racing	Ford	9
3	22	Joey Logano	Team Penske	Ford	8
4	20	Erik Jones	Joe Gibbs Racing	Toyota	7
5	14	Clint Bowyer	Stewart-Hass Racing	Ford	6
6	9	Chase Elliott	Hendrick Motorsports	Chevrolet	5
7	2	Brad Keselowski	Team Penske	Ford	4
8	17	Ricky Stenhouse Jr.	Roush Fenway Racing	Ford	3
9	11	Denny Hamlin	Joe Gibbs Racing	Toyota	2
10	10	Aric Almirola	Stewart–Haas Racing	Ford	1
Official stage two results

=== Final Stage Results ===
Stage 3 Laps: 164

Pos	Grid	No	Driver	Team	Manufacturer	Laps	Points
1	8	18	Kyle Busch	Joe Gibbs Racing	Toyota	334	59
2	2	4	Kevin Harvick	Stewart–Haas Racing	Ford	334	45
3	24	1	Jamie McMurray	Chip Ganassi Racing	Chevrolet	334	38
4	21	20	Erik Jones	Joe Gibbs Racing	Toyota	334	41
5	4	12	Ryan Blaney	Team Penske	Ford	334	32
6	7	22	Joey Logano	Team Penske	Ford	334	46
7	1	41	Kurt Busch	Stewart–Haas Racing	Ford	334	47
8	15	43	Bubba Wallace (R)	Richard Petty Motorsports	Chevrolet	334	29
9	3	14	Clint Bowyer	Stewart–Haas Racing	Ford	334	39
10	33	24	William Byron (R)	Hendrick Motorsports	Chevrolet	334	27
11	20	9	Chase Elliott	Hendrick Motorsports	Chevrolet	333	33
12	13	6	Trevor Bayne	Roush Fenway Racing	Ford	333	25
13	23	13	Ty Dillon	Germain Racing	Chevrolet	332	24
14	27	34	Michael McDowell	Front Row Motorsports	Ford	332	23
15	18	37	Chris Buescher	JTG Daugherty Racing	Chevrolet	331	22
16	30	32	Matt DiBenedetto	Go Fas Racing	Ford	329	21
17	28	95	Kasey Kahne	Leavine Family Racing	Chevrolet	328	20
18	31	15	Ross Chastain (i)	Premium Motorsports	Chevrolet	325	0
19	34	72	Cole Whitt	TriStar Motorsports	Chevrolet	324	18
20	32	23	Gray Gaulding	BK Racing	Toyota	322	17
21	35	00	Landon Cassill	StarCom Racing	Chevrolet	321	16
22	36	51	Harrison Rhodes	Rick Ware Racing	Chevrolet	319	15
23	29	38	David Ragan	Front Row Motorsports	Ford	317	14
24	22	47	A. J. Allmendinger	JTG Daugherty Racing	Chevrolet	316	13
25	26	17	Ricky Stenhouse Jr.	Roush Fenway Racing	Ford	315	15
26	17	3	Austin Dillon	Richard Childress Racing	Chevrolet	304	11
27	25	31	Ryan Newman	Richard Childress Racing	Chevrolet	303	10
28	16	88	Alex Bowman	Hendrick Motorsports	Chevrolet	294	9
29	14	19	Daniel Suárez	Joe Gibbs Racing	Toyota	290	8
30	19	21	Paul Menard	Wood Brothers Racing	Ford	215	7
31	37	55	Reed Sorenson	Premium Motorsports	Chevrolet	209	6
32	12	10	Aric Almirola	Stewart-Hass Racing	Ford	178	6
33	11	2	Brad Keselowski	Team Penske	Ford	178	11
34	5	11	Denny Hamlin	Joe Gibbs Racing	Toyota	177	5
35	9	48	Jimmie Johnson	Hendricks Motorsports	Chevrolet	175	2
36	10	42	Kyle Larson	Chip Ganassi Racing	Chevrolet	126	7
37	6	78	Martin Truex Jr.	Furniture Row Racing	Toyota	80	1
Official race results

=== Race statistics ===
- Lead changes: 8 among different drivers
- Cautions/Laps: 8 for 48
- Red flags: 1 for 11 minutes and 5 seconds
- Time of race: 3 hours, 32 minutes and 7 seconds
- Average speed: 141.714 miles per hour (228.067 km/h)

== Media ==
=== Television ===
Fox Sports covered their 18th race at the Texas Motor Speedway. Mike Joy, 2009 race winner Jeff Gordon and Darrell Waltrip had the call in the booth for the race. Jamie Little, Vince Welch and Matt Yocum handled the pit road duties for the television side.

FS1
Booth announcers	Pit reporters
Lap-by-lap: Mike Joy; Color-commentator: Jeff Gordon; Color commentator: Darrell Waltrip	Jamie Little; Vince Welch; Matt Yocum

=== Radio ===
The race was broadcast on radio by the Performance Racing Network and simulcast on Sirius XM NASCAR Radio.

PRN
Booth announcers	Turn announcers	Pit reporters
Lead announcer: Doug Rice; Announcer: Mark Garrow; Announcer: Wendy Venturini	Turns 1 & 2: Rob Albright; Turns 3 & 4: Pat Patterson	Brad Gillie; Brett McMillan; Jim Noble; Steve Richards

== Standings after the race ==
Drivers' Championship standings

	Pos	Driver	Points
	1	Kyle Busch	316
2	2	Joey Logano	278 (–38)
	3	Ryan Blaney	265 (–51)
3	4	Kevin Harvick	257 (–59)
3	5	Martin Truex Jr.	250 (–66)
2	6	Clint Bowyer	249 (–67)
2	7	Brad Keselowski	237 (–79)
2	8	Kurt Busch	224 (–92)
3	9	Denny Hamlin	222 (–94)
1	10	Kyle Larson	202 (–114)
1	11	Erik Jones	193 (–123)
1	12	Aric Almirola	177 (–139)
	13	Austin Dillon	159 (–157)
	14	Alex Bowman	154 (–162)
3	15	Chase Elliott	148 (–168)
1	16	Paul Menard	146 (–170)
Official driver's standings

Manufacturers' Championship standings

Pos	Manufacturer	Points
1	Ford	253
2	Toyota	252 (–1)
3	Chevrolet	227 (–26)
Official manufacturers' standings

- Note: Only the first 16 positions are included for the driver standings.
- . – Driver has clinched a position in the Monster Energy NASCAR Cup Series playoffs.

Previous race: 2018 STP 500	Monster Energy NASCAR Cup Series; 2018 season	Next race: 2018 Food City 500
