= 2018 STP 500 =

Race details
- Race 6 of 36 in the 2018 Monster Energy NASCAR Cup Series
- 2018 STP 500 program cover
- Date: March 26, 2018
- Location: Martinsville Speedway in Ridgeway, Virginia
- Course: Permanent racing facility
- Course length: 0.526 miles (0.847 km)
- Distance: 500 laps, 263 mi (423.5 km)
- Average speed: 81.663 miles per hour (131.424 km/h)

Pole position
Driver	Martin Truex Jr.	Furniture Row Racing
- Time: N/A

Most laps led
Driver	Clint Bowyer	Stewart–Haas Racing
- Laps: 215

Winner
No. 14	Clint Bowyer	Stewart–Haas Racing

Television in the United States
- Network: FS1
- Announcers: Mike Joy, Jeff Gordon and Darrell Waltrip

Radio in the United States
- Radio: MRN
- Booth announcers: Joe Moore, Jeff Striegle and Rusty Wallace
- Turn announcers: Dave Moody (Backstretch)

The 2018 STP 500 was a Monster Energy NASCAR Cup Series race held on March 26, 2018, at Martinsville Speedway in Ridgeway, Virginia. Contested over 500 laps on the .526 mile (.847 km) paperclip-shaped short track, it was sixth race of the 2018 Monster Energy NASCAR Cup Series season. The race was postponed from Sunday, March 25 to Monday, March 26 due to snow accumulation in Martinsville.

== Report ==
=== Background ===
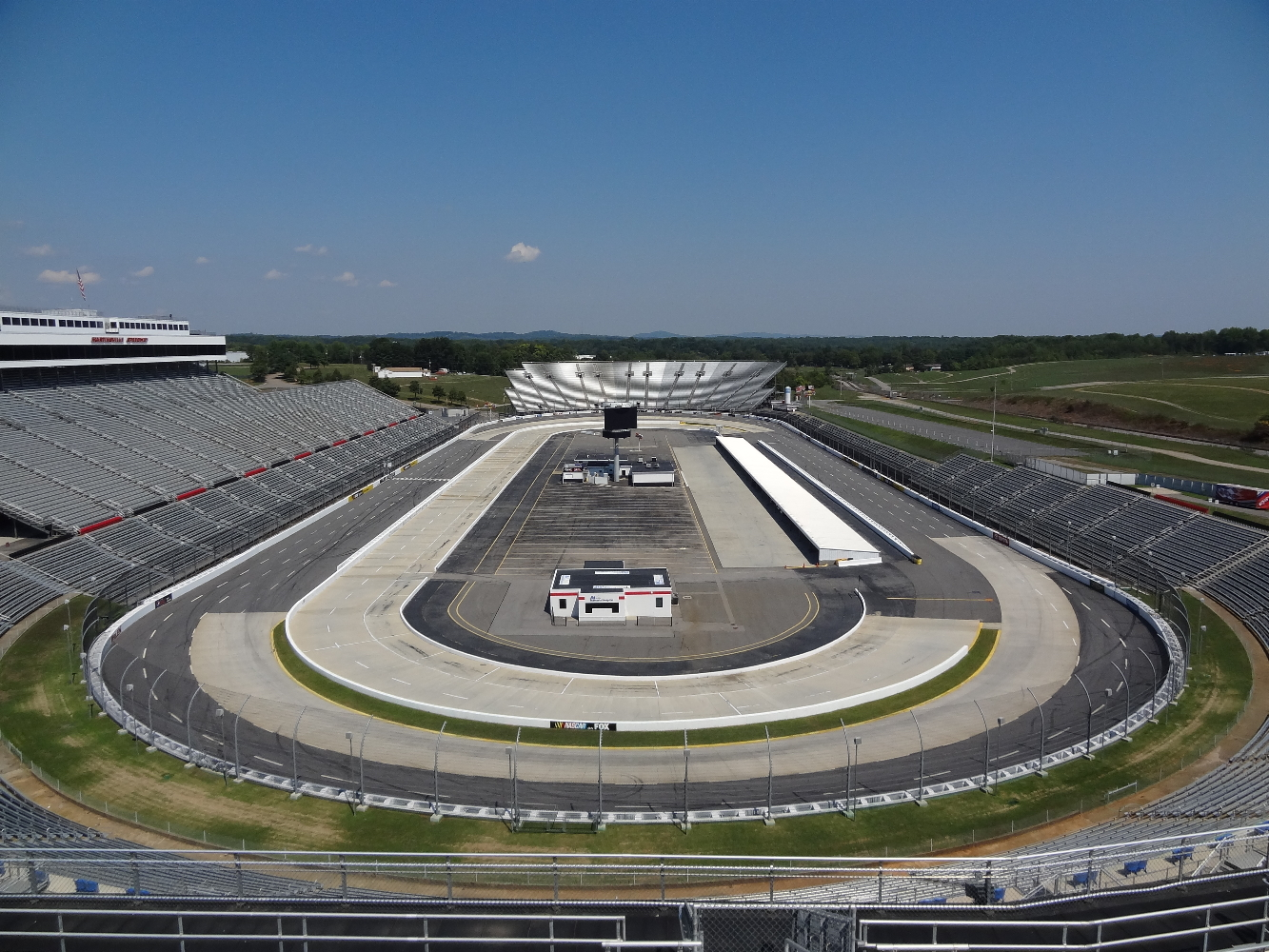
Martinsville Speedway, the track where the race was held.

Martinsville Speedway is an International Speedway Corporation-owned NASCAR stock car racing track located in Henry County, in Ridgeway, Virginia, just to the south of Martinsville. At 0.526 miles (0.847 km) in length, it is the shortest track in the Monster Energy NASCAR Cup Series. The track was also one of the first paved oval tracks in NASCAR, being built in 1947 by H. Clay Earles. It is also the only remaining race track that has been on the NASCAR circuit from its beginning in 1948.

==== Entry list ====
No.	Driver	Team	Manufacturer
00	Landon Cassill	StarCom Racing	Chevrolet
1	Jamie McMurray	Chip Ganassi Racing	Chevrolet
2	Brad Keselowski	Team Penske	Ford
3	Austin Dillon	Richard Childress Racing	Chevrolet
4	Kevin Harvick	Stewart–Haas Racing	Ford
6	Trevor Bayne	Roush Fenway Racing	Ford
9	Chase Elliott	Hendrick Motorsports	Chevrolet
10	Aric Almirola	Stewart–Haas Racing	Ford
11	Denny Hamlin	Joe Gibbs Racing	Toyota
12	Ryan Blaney	Team Penske	Ford
13	Ty Dillon	Germain Racing	Chevrolet
14	Clint Bowyer	Stewart–Haas Racing	Ford
15	Ross Chastain (i)	Premium Motorsports	Chevrolet
17	Ricky Stenhouse Jr.	Roush Fenway Racing	Ford
18	Kyle Busch	Joe Gibbs Racing	Toyota
19	Daniel Suárez	Joe Gibbs Racing	Toyota
20	Erik Jones	Joe Gibbs Racing	Toyota
21	Paul Menard	Wood Brothers Racing	Ford
22	Joey Logano	Team Penske	Ford
23	Gray Gaulding	BK Racing	Toyota
24	William Byron (R)	Hendrick Motorsports	Chevrolet
31	Ryan Newman	Richard Childress Racing	Chevrolet
32	Matt DiBenedetto	Go Fas Racing	Ford
34	Michael McDowell	Front Row Motorsports	Ford
37	Chris Buescher	JTG Daugherty Racing	Chevrolet
38	David Ragan	Front Row Motorsports	Ford
41	Kurt Busch	Stewart–Haas Racing	Ford
42	Kyle Larson	Chip Ganassi Racing	Chevrolet
43	Bubba Wallace (R)	Richard Petty Motorsports	Chevrolet
47	A. J. Allmendinger	JTG Daugherty Racing	Chevrolet
48	Jimmie Johnson	Hendrick Motorsports	Chevrolet
51	Harrison Rhodes	Rick Ware Racing	Chevrolet
55	J. J. Yeley (i)	Premium Motorsports	Chevrolet
72	Cole Whitt	TriStar Motorsports	Chevrolet
78	Martin Truex Jr.	Furniture Row Racing	Toyota
88	Alex Bowman	Hendrick Motorsports	Chevrolet
95	Kasey Kahne	Leavine Family Racing	Chevrolet
96	D. J. Kennington	Gaunt Brothers Racing	Toyota
Official entry list

== Practice ==
=== First practice ===
Martin Truex Jr. was the fastest in the first practice session with a time of 19.776 seconds and a speed of 95.752 mph (154.098 km/h).

Pos	No.	Driver	Team	Manufacturer	Time	Speed
1	78	Martin Truex Jr.	Furniture Row Racing	Toyota	19.776	95.752
2	2	Brad Keselowski	Team Penske	Ford	19.798	95.646
3	18	Kyle Busch	Joe Gibbs Racing	Toyota	19.888	95.213
Official first practice results

=== Final practice ===
Martin Truex Jr. was the fastest in the final practice session with a time of 19.846 seconds and a speed of 95.415 mph (153.556 km/h).

Pos	No.	Driver	Team	Manufacturer	Time	Speed
1	78	Martin Truex Jr.	Furniture Row Racing	Toyota	19.846	95.415
2	2	Brad Keselowski	Team Penske	Ford	19.874	95.280
3	19	Daniel Suárez	Joe Gibbs Racing	Toyota	19.882	95.242
Official final practice results

== Qualifying ==
Qualifying for Saturday was cancelled due to snow and Martin Truex Jr., the point leader, was awarded the pole as a result.

=== Starting Lineup ===
Pos	No.	Driver	Team	Manufacturer
1	78	Martin Truex Jr.	Furniture Row Racing	Toyota
2	18	Kyle Busch	Joe Gibbs Racing	Toyota
3	22	Joey Logano	Team Penske	Ford
4	2	Brad Keselowski	Team Penske	Ford
5	12	Ryan Blaney	Team Penske	Ford
6	11	Denny Hamlin	Joe Gibbs Racing	Toyota
7	42	Kyle Larson	Chip Ganassi Racing	Chevrolet
8	4	Kevin Harvick	Stewart–Haas Racing	Ford
9	14	Clint Bowyer	Stewart–Haas Racing	Ford
10	10	Aric Almirola	Stewart–Haas Racing	Ford
11	41	Kurt Busch	Stewart–Haas Racing	Ford
12	3	Austin Dillon	Richard Childress Racing	Chevrolet
13	20	Erik Jones	Joe Gibbs Racing	Toyota
14	31	Ryan Newman	Richard Childress Racing	Chevrolet
15	21	Paul Menard	Wood Brothers Racing	Ford
16	88	Alex Bowman	Hendrick Motorsports	Chevrolet
17	17	Ricky Stenhouse Jr.	Roush Fenway Racing	Ford
18	48	Jimmie Johnson	Hendrick Motorsports	Chevrolet
19	43	Bubba Wallace (R)	Richard Petty Motorsports	Chevrolet
20	24	William Byron (R)	Hendrick Motorsports	Chevrolet
21	9	Chase Elliott	Hendrick Motorsports	Chevrolet
22	37	Chris Buescher	JTG Daugherty Racing	Chevrolet
23	19	Daniel Suárez	Joe Gibbs Racing	Toyota
24	34	Michael McDowell	Front Row Motorsports	Ford
25	47	A. J. Allmendinger	JTG Daugherty Racing	Chevrolet
26	1	Jamie McMurray	Chip Ganassi Racing	Chevrolet
27	6	Trevor Bayne	Roush Fenway Racing	Ford
28	38	David Ragan	Front Row Motorsports	Ford
29	95	Kasey Kahne	Leavine Family Racing	Chevrolet
30	51	Harrison Rhodes	Rick Ware Racing	Chevrolet
31	32	Matt DiBenedetto	Go Fas Racing	Ford
32	13	Ty Dillon	Germain Racing	Chevrolet
33	15	Ross Chastain (i)	Premium Motorsports	Chevrolet
34	23	Gray Gaulding	BK Racing	Toyota
35	72	Cole Whitt	Tri-Star Motorsports	Chevrolet
36	00	Landon Cassill	StarCom Racing	Chevrolet
37	96	D. J. Kennington	Gaunt Brothers Racing	Toyota
38	55	J. J. Yeley (i)	Premium Motorsports	Chevrolet
Official starting lineup

== Race ==
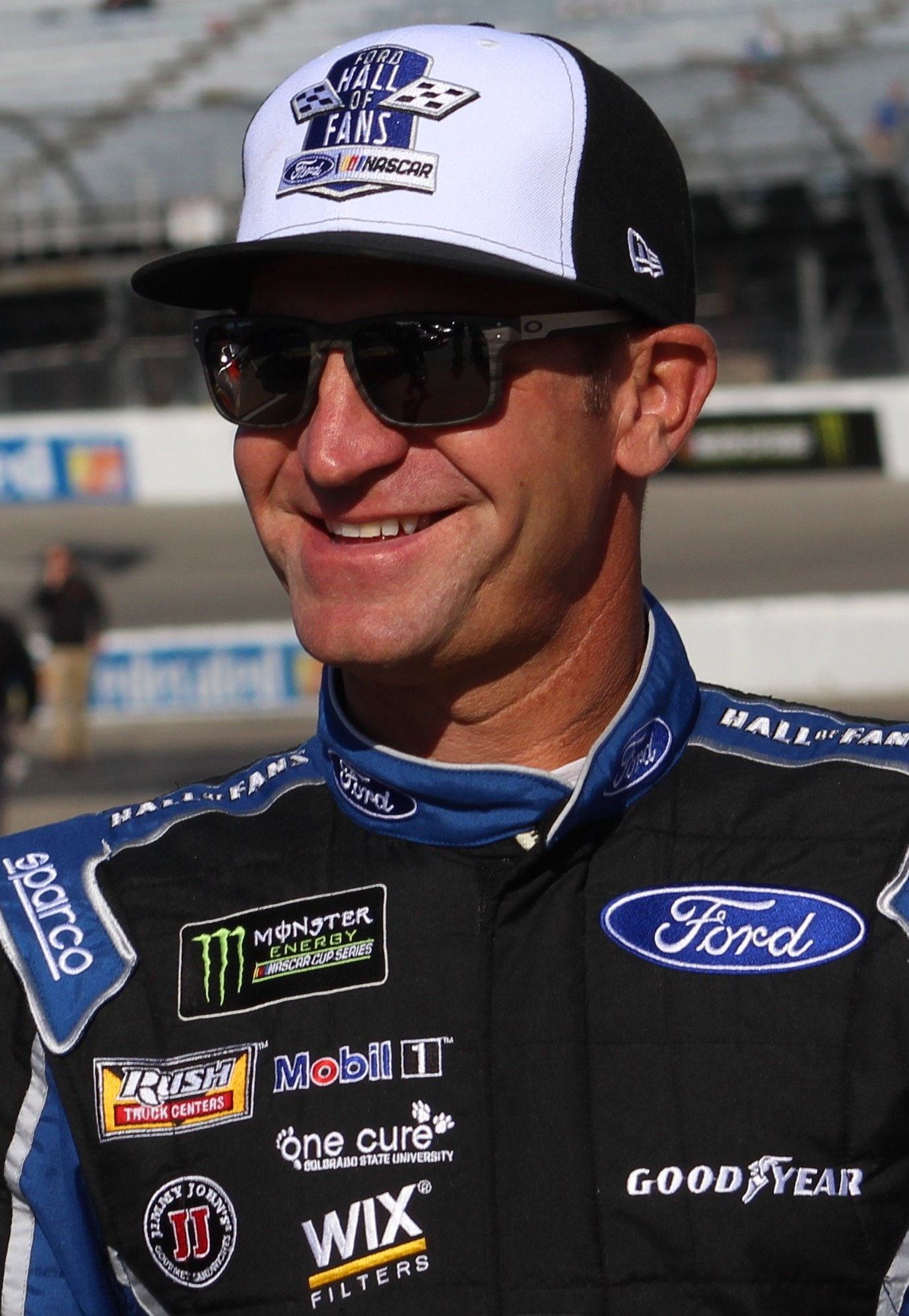
Clint Bowyer won the race, breaking a dry spell of 190 losses.

=== Stage Results ===
Stage One Laps: 130

Pos	No	Driver	Team	Manufacturer	Points
1	11	Denny Hamlin	Joe Gibbs Racing	Toyota	10
2	2	Brad Keselowski	Team Penske	Ford	9
3	12	Ryan Blaney	Team Penske	Ford	8
4	18	Kyle Busch	Joe Gibbs Racing	Toyota	7
5	14	Clint Bowyer	Stewart–Haas Racing	Ford	6
6	4	Kevin Harvick	Stewart–Haas Racing	Ford	5
7	47	A. J. Allmendinger	JTG Daugherty Racing	Chevrolet	4
8	41	Kurt Busch	Stewart–Haas Racing	Ford	3
9	22	Joey Logano	Team Penske	Ford	2
10	48	Jimmie Johnson	Hendrick Motorsports	Chevrolet	1
Official stage one results

Stage Two Laps: 130

Pos	No	Driver	Team	Manufacturer	Points
1	12	Ryan Blaney	Team Penske	Ford	10
2	14	Clint Bowyer	Stewart–Haas Racing	Ford	9
3	18	Kyle Busch	Joe Gibbs Racing	Toyota	8
4	2	Brad Keselowski	Team Penske	Ford	7
5	11	Denny Hamlin	Joe Gibbs Racing	Toyota	6
6	4	Kevin Harvick	Stewart–Haas Racing	Ford	5
7	41	Kurt Busch	Stewart–Haas Racing	Ford	4
8	47	A. J. Allmendinger	JTG Daugherty Racing	Chevrolet	3
9	22	Joey Logano	Team Penske	Ford	2
10	48	Jimmie Johnson	Hendrick Motorsports	Chevrolet	1
Official stage two results

=== Final Stage Results ===
Stage Three Laps: 240

Pos	Grid	No	Driver	Team	Manufacturer	Laps	Points
1	9	14	Clint Bowyer	Stewart–Haas Racing	Ford	500	55
2	2	18	Kyle Busch	Joe Gibbs Racing	Toyota	500	50
3	5	12	Ryan Blaney	Team Penske	Ford	500	52
4	1	78	Martin Truex Jr.	Furniture Row Racing	Toyota	500	33
5	8	4	Kevin Harvick	Stewart–Haas Racing	Ford	500	42
6	3	22	Joey Logano	Team Penske	Ford	500	35
7	16	88	Alex Bowman	Hendrick Motorsports	Chevrolet	500	30
8	25	47	A. J. Allmendinger	JTG Daugherty Racing	Chevrolet	500	36
9	21	9	Chase Elliott	Hendrick Motorsports	Chevrolet	500	28
10	4	2	Brad Keselowski	Team Penske	Ford	500	43
11	11	41	Kurt Busch	Stewart–Haas Racing	Ford	500	33
12	6	11	Denny Hamlin	Joe Gibbs Racing	Toyota	500	41
13	15	21	Paul Menard	Wood Brothers Racing	Ford	500	24
14	10	10	Aric Almirola	Stewart–Haas Racing	Ford	500	23
15	18	48	Jimmie Johnson	Hendrick Motorsports	Chevrolet	499	24
16	7	42	Kyle Larson	Chip Ganassi Racing	Chevrolet	499	21
17	13	20	Erik Jones	Joe Gibbs Racing	Toyota	497	20
18	23	19	Daniel Suárez	Joe Gibbs Racing	Toyota	497	19
19	14	31	Ryan Newman	Richard Childress Racing	Chevrolet	497	18
20	20	24	William Byron (R)	Hendrick Motorsports	Chevrolet	497	17
21	24	34	Michael McDowell	Front Row Motorsports	Ford	497	16
22	32	13	Ty Dillon	Germain Racing	Chevrolet	496	15
23	22	37	Chris Buescher	JTG Daugherty Racing	Chevrolet	496	14
24	29	95	Kasey Kahne	Leavine Family Racing	Chevrolet	496	13
25	28	38	David Ragan	Front Row Motorsports	Ford	495	12
26	26	1	Jamie McMurray	Chip Ganassi Racing	Chevrolet	495	11
27	35	72	Cole Whitt	TriStar Motorsports	Chevrolet	493	10
28	37	96	D. J. Kennington	Gaunt Brothers Racing	Toyota	493	9
29	33	15	Ross Chastain (i)	Premium Motorsports	Chevrolet	493	0
30	12	3	Austin Dillon	Richard Childress Racing	Chevrolet	493	7
31	38	55	J. J. Yeley (i)	Premium Motorsports	Chevrolet	493	0
32	31	32	Matt DiBenedetto	Go Fas Racing	Ford	488	5
33	27	6	Trevor Bayne	Roush Fenway Racing	Ford	486	4
34	19	43	Bubba Wallace (R)	Richard Petty Motorsports	Chevrolet	486	3
35	30	51	Harrison Rhodes	Rick Ware Racing	Chevrolet	482	2
36	34	23	Gray Gaulding	BK Racing	Toyota	481	1
37	17	17	Ricky Stenhouse Jr.	Roush Fenway Racing	Ford	481	1
38	36	00	Landon Cassill	StarCom Racing	Chevrolet	211	1
Official race results

=== Race statistics ===
- Lead changes: 6 among different drivers
- Cautions/Laps: 4 for 33
- Red flags: 0
- Time of race: 3 hours, 13 minutes and 14 seconds
- Average speed: 81.663 miles per hour (131.424 km/h)

== Media ==
=== Television ===
Fox Sports was covering their 18th race at the Martinsville Speedway. Mike Joy, nine-time Martinsville winner Jeff Gordon and 11-time Martinsville winner Darrell Waltrip called in the booth for the race. Jamie Little, Vince Welch and Matt Yocum handled pit road duties for the entire race.

FS1
Booth announcers	Pit reporters
Lap-by-lap: Mike Joy; Color-commentator: Jeff Gordon; Color commentator: Darrell Waltrip	Jamie Little; Vince Welch; Matt Yocum

=== Radio ===
MRN had the radio call for the race which would also be simulcasted on Sirius XM NASCAR Radio. Joe Moore, Jeff Striegle and seven-time Martinsville winner Rusty Wallace called the race in the booth as the cars were on the frontstretch. Dave Moody called the race from atop the turn 3 stands as the field is racing down the backstretch. Alex Hayden, Winston Kelley and Steve Post worked pit road for the radio side.

MRN
Booth announcers	Turn announcers	Pit reporters
Lead announcer: Joe Moore; Announcer: Jeff Striegle; Announcer: Rusty Wallace	Backstretch: Dave Moody	Alex Hayden; Winston Kelley; Steve Post

== Standings after the race ==
Drivers' Championship standings

	Pos	Driver	Points
1	1	Kyle Busch	257
1	2	Martin Truex Jr.	249 (–8)
2	3	Ryan Blaney	233 (–24)
1	4	Joey Logano	232 (–25)
1	5	Brad Keselowski	226 (–31)
	6	Denny Hamlin	217 (–40)
1	7	Kevin Harvick	212 (–45)
1	8	Clint Bowyer	210 (–47)
2	9	Kyle Larson	195 (–62)
1	10	Kurt Busch	177 (–80)
1	11	Aric Almirola	171 (–86)
1	12	Erik Jones	152 (–105)
1	13	Austin Dillon	148 (–109)
2	14	Alex Bowman	145 (–112)
	15	Paul Menard	139 (–118)
2	16	Ryan Newman	135 (–122)
Official driver's standings

Manufacturers' Championship standings

Pos	Manufacturer	Points
1	Ford	218
2	Toyota	212 (–6)
3	Chevrolet	193 (–25)
Official manufacturers' standings

- Note: Only the first 16 positions are included for the driver standings.

Previous race: 2018 Auto Club 400	Monster Energy NASCAR Cup Series; 2018 season	Next race: 2018 O'Reilly Auto Parts 500
