= 2016 O'Reilly Auto Parts 300 =

Sixth race of the 2016 NASCAR Xfinity Series

Race details
- Race 6 of 33 in the 2016 NASCAR Xfinity Series
- Date: April 8, 2016
- Official name: 20th Annual O'Reilly Auto Parts 300
- Location: Fort Worth, Texas, Texas Motor Speedway
- Course: Permanent racing facility
- Course length: 1.5 miles (2.41 km)
- Distance: 200 laps, 300 mi (482.803 km)
- Scheduled distance: 200 laps, 300 mi (482.803 km)
- Average speed: 141.121 miles per hour (227.112 km/h)

Pole position
Driver	Kyle Busch	Joe Gibbs Racing
- Time: 28.651

Most laps led
Driver	Kyle Busch	Joe Gibbs Racing
- Laps: 150

Winner
No. 18	Kyle Busch	Joe Gibbs Racing

Television in the United States
- Network: Fox Sports 1
- Announcers: Adam Alexander, Michael Waltrip, Carl Edwards

Radio in the United States
- Radio: Performance Racing Network

The 2016 O'Reilly Auto Parts 300 was the sixth stock car race of the 2016 NASCAR Xfinity Series season and the 20th iteration of the event. The race was held on Friday, April 8, 2016, in Fort Worth, Texas, at Texas Motor Speedway, a 1.5 miles (2.4 km) permanent tri-oval shaped racetrack. The race took the scheduled 200 laps to complete. At race's end, Kyle Busch, driving for Joe Gibbs Racing, would dominate the race to win his 80th career NASCAR Xfinity Series win and his fourth of the season. To fill out the podium, Erik Jones, driving for Joe Gibbs Racing, and Brad Keselowski, driving for Team Penske, would finish second and third, respectively.

== Background ==
The layout of Texas Motor Speedway, the venue where the race was held.

Texas Motor Speedway is a speedway located in the northernmost portion of the U.S. city of Fort Worth, Texas – the portion located in Denton County, Texas. The track measures 1.5 miles (2.4 km) around and is banked 24 degrees in the turns, and is of the oval design, where the front straightaway juts outward slightly. The track layout is similar to Atlanta Motor Speedway and Charlotte Motor Speedway (formerly Lowe's Motor Speedway). The track is owned by Speedway Motorsports, Inc., the same company that owns Atlanta and Charlotte Motor Speedway, as well as the short-track Bristol Motor Speedway.

=== Entry list ===
- (R) denotes rookie driver.
- (i) denotes driver who is ineligible for series driver points.

#	Driver	Team	Make	Sponsor
0	Garrett Smithley	JD Motorsports	Chevrolet	Third Gen Automotive
1	Elliott Sadler	JR Motorsports	Chevrolet	OneMain Financial
01	Ryan Preece (R)	JD Motorsports	Chevrolet	G&K Services
2	Austin Dillon (i)	Richard Childress Racing	Chevrolet	Ruud, Smurfit Kappa
3	Ty Dillon	Richard Childress Racing	Chevrolet	Bulwark Protective Apparel
4	Ross Chastain	JD Motorsports	Chevrolet	Flex Seal
5	Chase Elliott (i)	JR Motorsports	Chevrolet	TaxSlayer
6	Bubba Wallace	Roush Fenway Racing	Ford	Fastenal
7	Justin Allgaier	JR Motorsports	Chevrolet	Breyers
07	Ray Black Jr. (R)	SS-Green Light Racing	Chevrolet	ScubaLife
10	Jeff Green	TriStar Motorsports	Toyota	TriStar Motorsports
11	Blake Koch	Kaulig Racing	Chevrolet	LeafFilter Gutter Protection
13	Matt DiBenedetto (i)	MBM Motorsports	Toyota	Truxx Outfitters, Chris Kyle Memorial Benefit
14	J. J. Yeley	TriStar Motorsports	Toyota	ZAK Products
15	Todd Peck	Rick Ware Racing	Ford	X-treme pH Sports Water
16	Ryan Reed	Roush Fenway Racing	Ford	Lilly Diabetes
18	Kyle Busch (i)	Joe Gibbs Racing	Toyota	NOS Energy
19	Daniel Suárez	Joe Gibbs Racing	Toyota	Juniper Networks
20	Erik Jones (R)	Joe Gibbs Racing	Toyota	GameStop, Turtle Beach
22	Brad Keselowski (i)	Team Penske	Ford	Discount Tire
24	Matt Tifft (i)	JGL Racing	Toyota	Arch Day
25	Cody Ware (R)	Rick Ware Racing	Chevrolet	Lilly Trucking
28	Dakoda Armstrong	JGL Racing	Toyota	WinField United
33	Brandon Jones (R)	Richard Childress Racing	Chevrolet	Texas Rangers
39	Ryan Sieg	RSS Racing	Chevrolet	Aries Well Service
40	Carl Long	MBM Motorsports	Dodge	MBM Motorsports
42	Kyle Larson (i)	Chip Ganassi Racing	Chevrolet	Eneos
43	Jeb Burton	Richard Petty Motorsports	Ford	J. Streicher
44	David Starr	TriStar Motorsports	Toyota	Zachry
48	Brennan Poole (R)	Chip Ganassi Racing	Chevrolet	DC Solar
51	Jeremy Clements	Jeremy Clements Racing	Chevrolet	RepairableVehicles.com
52	Joey Gase	Jimmy Means Racing	Chevrolet	Donate Life Texas
62	Brendan Gaughan	Richard Childress Racing	Chevrolet	WIX Filters
70	Derrike Cope	Derrike Cope Racing	Chevrolet	Rhino Linings, E-Hydrate
74	Mike Harmon	Mike Harmon Racing	Dodge	Mike Harmon Racing
78	B. J. McLeod (R)	B. J. McLeod Motorsports	Ford	X-treme pH Sports Water
88	Dale Earnhardt Jr. (i)	JR Motorsports	Chevrolet	Goody's Mixed Fruit Blast
90	Martin Roy	King Autosport	Chevrolet	Côté Snow Plows, Gamache Truck Center
93	Josh Wise (i)	RSS Racing	Chevrolet	RSS Racing
97	Ryan Ellis	Obaika Racing	Chevrolet	Vroom! Brands
98	Aric Almirola (i)	Biagi-DenBeste Racing	Ford	Carroll Shelby Foundation
Official entry list

== Practice ==
=== First practice ===
The first practice session was held on Thursday, April 7, at 3:00 p.m. CST. The session would last for one hour and 25 minutes. Erik Jones, driving for Joe Gibbs Racing, would set the fastest time in the session, with a lap of 28.882 and an average speed of 186.968 miles per hour (300.896 km/h).

Pos.	#	Driver	Team	Make	Time	Speed
1	20	Erik Jones (R)	Joe Gibbs Racing	Toyota	28.882	186.968
2	3	Ty Dillon	Richard Childress Racing	Chevrolet	29.353	183.968
3	33	Brandon Jones (R)	Richard Childress Racing	Chevrolet	29.480	183.175
Full first practice results

=== Second and final practice ===
The final practice session, sometimes known as Happy Hour, was held on Thursday, April 7, at 6:00 p.m. CST. The session would last for 55 minutes. Erik Jones, driving for Joe Gibbs Racing, would set the fastest time in the session, with a lap of 29.375 and an average speed of 183.830 miles per hour (295.846 km/h).

Pos.	#	Driver	Team	Make	Time	Speed
1	20	Erik Jones (R)	Joe Gibbs Racing	Toyota	29.375	183.830
2	18	Kyle Busch (i)	Joe Gibbs Racing	Toyota	29.622	182.297
3	42	Kyle Larson (i)	Chip Ganassi Racing	Chevrolet	29.683	181.922
Full Happy Hour practice results

== Qualifying ==
Qualifying was held on Friday, April 8, at 3:45 p.m. CST. Since Texas Motor Speedway is under 2 miles (3.2 km) in length, the qualifying system was a multi-car system that included three rounds. The first round was 15 minutes, where every driver would be able to set a lap within the 15 minutes. Then, the second round would consist of the fastest 24 cars in Round 1, and drivers would have 10 minutes to set a lap. Round 3 consisted of the fastest 12 drivers from Round 2, and the drivers would have 5 minutes to set a time. Whoever was fastest in Round 3 would win the pole.

Kyle Busch, driving for Joe Gibbs Racing, would win the pole after advancing from both preliminary rounds and setting the fastest lap in Round 3, with a time of 28.651 and an average speed of 188.475 miles per hour (303.321 km/h).

Jeff Green was the only driver to fail to qualify.

=== Full qualifying results ===
Pos.	#	Driver	Team	Make	Time (R1)	Speed (R1)	Time (R2)	Speed (R2)	Time (R3)	Speed (R3)
1	18	Kyle Busch (i)	Joe Gibbs Racing	Toyota	28.720	188.022	28.621	188.673	28.651	188.475
2	20	Erik Jones (R)	Joe Gibbs Racing	Toyota	28.587	188.897	28.750	187.826	28.715	188.055
3	19	Daniel Suárez	Joe Gibbs Racing	Toyota	29.086	185.656	28.777	187.650	28.755	187.793
4	42	Kyle Larson (i)	Chip Ganassi Racing	Chevrolet	28.812	187.422	28.824	187.344	28.862	187.097
5	48	Brennan Poole (R)	Chip Ganassi Racing	Chevrolet	28.881	186.974	28.919	186.728	28.878	186.994
6	3	Ty Dillon	Richard Childress Racing	Chevrolet	28.922	186.709	28.870	187.045	28.913	186.767
7	2	Austin Dillon (i)	Richard Childress Racing	Chevrolet	29.068	185.771	28.863	187.091	28.924	186.696
8	22	Brad Keselowski (i)	Team Penske	Ford	28.704	188.127	28.840	187.240	28.967	186.419
9	33	Brandon Jones (R)	Richard Childress Racing	Chevrolet	29.071	185.752	28.926	186.683	29.014	186.117
10	16	Ryan Reed	Roush Fenway Racing	Ford	28.961	186.458	28.997	186.226	29.030	186.014
11	88	Dale Earnhardt Jr. (i)	JR Motorsports	Chevrolet	29.033	185.995	28.987	186.290	29.060	185.822
12	43	Jeb Burton	Richard Petty Motorsports	Ford	29.004	186.181	28.966	186.425	29.236	184.704
Eliminated in Round 2
13	62	Brendan Gaughan	Richard Childress Racing	Chevrolet	29.209	184.875	29.000	186.207	-	-
14	39	Ryan Sieg	RSS Racing	Chevrolet	28.858	187.123	29.001	186.200	-	-
15	1	Elliott Sadler	JR Motorsports	Chevrolet	29.387	183.755	29.025	186.047	-	-
16	5	Chase Elliott (i)	JR Motorsports	Chevrolet	29.036	185.976	29.030	186.014	-	-
17	4	Ross Chastain	JD Motorsports	Chevrolet	28.970	186.400	29.065	185.790	-	-
18	98	Aric Almirola (i)	Biagi-DenBeste Racing	Ford	29.042	185.938	29.159	185.192	-	-
19	6	Bubba Wallace	Roush Fenway Racing	Ford	29.214	184.843	29.193	184.976	-	-
20	51	Jeremy Clements	Jeremy Clements Racing	Chevrolet	29.229	184.748	29.321	184.168	-	-
21	01	Ryan Preece (R)	JD Motorsports	Chevrolet	29.412	183.599	29.390	183.736	-	-
22	28	Dakoda Armstrong	JGL Racing	Toyota	29.279	184.433	29.407	183.630	-	-
23	7	Justin Allgaier	JR Motorsports	Chevrolet	29.194	184.970	-	-	-	-
24	0	Garrett Smithley (R)	JD Motorsports	Chevrolet	29.427	183.505	-	-	-	-
Eliminated in Round 1
25	11	Blake Koch	Kaulig Racing	Chevrolet	29.432	183.474	-	-	-	-
26	44	David Starr	TriStar Motorsports	Toyota	29.445	183.393	-	-	-	-
27	24	Matt Tifft (i)	JGL Racing	Toyota	29.474	183.212	-	-	-	-
28	93	Josh Wise (i)	RSS Racing	Chevrolet	29.479	183.181	-	-	-	-
29	14	J. J. Yeley	TriStar Motorsports	Toyota	29.648	182.137	-	-	-	-
30	52	Joey Gase	Jimmy Means Racing	Chevrolet	29.741	181.568	-	-	-	-
31	13	Matt DiBenedetto (i)	MBM Motorsports	Toyota	29.748	181.525	-	-	-	-
32	40	Carl Long	MBM Motorsports	Dodge	29.872	180.771	-	-	-	-
33	07	Ray Black Jr. (R)	SS-Green Light Racing	Chevrolet	29.889	180.668	-	-	-	-
Qualified by owner's points
34	97	Ryan Ellis	Obaika Racing	Chevrolet	30.226	178.654	-	-	-	-
35	70	Derrike Cope	Derrike Cope Racing	Chevrolet	30.628	176.309	-	-	-	-
36	90	Martin Roy	King Autosport	Chevrolet	30.750	175.610	-	-	-	-
37	78	B. J. McLeod (R)	B. J. McLeod Motorsports	Ford	30.883	174.853	-	-	-	-
38	25	Cody Ware (R)	Rick Ware Racing	Chevrolet	31.144	173.388	-	-	-	-
39	74	Mike Harmon	Mike Harmon Racing	Dodge	31.367	172.155	-	-	-	-
40	15	Todd Peck	Rick Ware Racing	Ford	31.807	169.774	-	-	-	-
Failed to qualify
41	10	Jeff Green	TriStar Motorsports	Toyota	30.172	178.974	-	-	-	-
Official qualifying results
Official starting lineup

== Race results ==
Fin	St	#	Driver	Team	Make	Laps	Led	Status	Pts
1	1	18	Kyle Busch (i)	Joe Gibbs Racing	Toyota	200	150	running	0
2	2	20	Erik Jones (R)	Joe Gibbs Racing	Toyota	200	12	running	40
3	8	22	Brad Keselowski (i)	Team Penske	Ford	200	0	running	0
4	16	5	Chase Elliott (i)	JR Motorsports	Chevrolet	200	0	running	0
5	11	88	Dale Earnhardt Jr. (i)	JR Motorsports	Chevrolet	200	0	running	0
6	23	7	Justin Allgaier	JR Motorsports	Chevrolet	200	0	running	35
7	15	1	Elliott Sadler	JR Motorsports	Chevrolet	200	0	running	34
8	7	2	Austin Dillon (i)	Richard Childress Racing	Chevrolet	200	0	running	0
9	9	33	Brandon Jones (R)	Richard Childress Racing	Chevrolet	200	0	running	32
10	14	39	Ryan Sieg	RSS Racing	Chevrolet	200	0	running	31
11	4	42	Kyle Larson (i)	Chip Ganassi Racing	Chevrolet	200	38	running	0
12	13	62	Brendan Gaughan	Richard Childress Racing	Chevrolet	200	0	running	29
13	6	3	Ty Dillon	Richard Childress Racing	Chevrolet	200	0	running	28
14	10	16	Ryan Reed	Roush Fenway Racing	Ford	200	0	running	27
15	19	6	Bubba Wallace	Roush Fenway Racing	Ford	200	0	running	26
16	3	19	Daniel Suárez	Joe Gibbs Racing	Toyota	199	0	running	25
17	18	98	Aric Almirola (i)	Biagi-DenBeste Racing	Ford	197	0	running	0
18	26	44	David Starr	TriStar Motorsports	Toyota	197	0	running	23
19	5	48	Brennan Poole (R)	Chip Ganassi Racing	Chevrolet	197	0	running	22
20	27	24	Matt Tifft (i)	JGL Racing	Toyota	197	0	running	0
21	17	4	Ross Chastain	JD Motorsports	Chevrolet	196	0	running	20
22	33	07	Ray Black Jr. (R)	SS-Green Light Racing	Chevrolet	196	0	running	19
23	24	0	Garrett Smithley (R)	JD Motorsports	Chevrolet	195	0	running	18
24	20	51	Jeremy Clements	Jeremy Clements Racing	Chevrolet	195	0	running	17
25	36	90	Martin Roy	King Autosport	Chevrolet	194	0	running	16
26	22	28	Dakoda Armstrong	JGL Racing	Toyota	193	0	running	15
27	30	52	Joey Gase	Jimmy Means Racing	Chevrolet	192	0	running	14
28	21	01	Ryan Preece (R)	JD Motorsports	Chevrolet	190	0	running	13
29	37	78	B. J. McLeod (R)	B. J. McLeod Motorsports	Ford	189	0	running	12
30	34	97	Ryan Ellis	Obaika Racing	Chevrolet	189	0	running	11
31	35	70	Derrike Cope	Derrike Cope Racing	Chevrolet	188	0	running	10
32	31	13	Matt DiBenedetto (i)	MBM Motorsports	Toyota	186	0	running	0
33	39	74	Mike Harmon	Mike Harmon Racing	Dodge	182	0	running	8
34	25	11	Blake Koch	Kaulig Racing	Chevrolet	143	0	crash	7
35	12	43	Jeb Burton	Richard Petty Motorsports	Ford	142	0	crash	6
36	38	25	Cody Ware (R)	Rick Ware Racing	Chevrolet	85	0	electrical	5
37	40	15	Todd Peck	Rick Ware Racing	Ford	42	0	overheating	4
38	29	14	J. J. Yeley	TriStar Motorsports	Toyota	40	0	clutch	3
39	32	40	Carl Long	MBM Motorsports	Dodge	9	0	engine	2
40	28	93	Josh Wise (i)	RSS Racing	Chevrolet	8	0	brakes	0
Failed to qualify
41		10	Jeff Green	TriStar Motorsports	Toyota				
Official race results

== Standings after the race ==
Drivers' Championship standings

Pos	Driver	Points
1	Daniel Suárez	207
2	Elliott Sadler	206 (-1)
3	Justin Allgaier	198 (–9)
4	Brandon Jones	193 (–14)
5	Erik Jones	192 (–15)
6	Ty Dillon	187 (-20)
7	Brendan Gaughan	183 (-24)
8	Bubba Wallace	160 (-47)
9	Ryan Reed	160 (-47)
10	Brennan Poole	152 (-55)
11	Ryan Sieg	130 (-77)
12	Blake Koch	129 (-78)
Official driver's standings

- Note: Only the first 12 positions are included for the driver standings.

Previous race: 2016 TreatMyClot.com 300	NASCAR Xfinity Series; 2016 season	Next race: 2016 Fitzgerald Glider Kits 300
