= 2016 Fitzgerald Glider Kits 300 =

Seventh race of the 2016 NASCAR Xfinity Series

Race details
- Race 7 of 33 in the 2016 NASCAR Xfinity Series
- Date: April 16, 2016
- Official name: 34th Annual Fitzgerald Glider Kits 300
- Location: Bristol, Tennessee, Bristol Motor Speedway
- Course: Permanent racing facility
- Course length: 0.533 miles (0.828 km)
- Distance: 200 laps, 106.6 mi (171.556 km)
- Scheduled distance: 200 laps, 106.6 mi (171.556 km)
- Average speed: 93.829 miles per hour (151.003 km/h)

Pole position
Driver	Erik Jones	Joe Gibbs Racing
- Grid positions set by heat results

Most laps led
Driver	Kyle Larson	Chip Ganassi Racing
- Laps: 94

Winner
No. 20	Erik Jones	Joe Gibbs Racing

Television in the United States
- Network: Fox Sports 1
- Announcers: Adam Alexander, Michael Waltrip, Brad Keselowski

Radio in the United States
- Radio: Performance Racing Network

The 2016 Fitzgerald Glider Kits 300 was the seventh stock car race of the 2016 NASCAR Xfinity Series season and the 34th iteration of the event. The race was held on Saturday, April 16, 2016, in Bristol, Tennessee at Bristol Motor Speedway, a 0.533 miles (0.858 km) permanent oval-shaped racetrack. The race took the scheduled 200 laps to complete, with the first 100 laps being split into two 50-lap heats of 20 cars. At race's end, Erik Jones, driving for Joe Gibbs Racing, would complete a late race charge on the final restart with three to go to win his third career NASCAR Xfinity Series win and his first of the season. To fill out the podium, Kyle Busch, driving for Joe Gibbs Racing, and Kyle Larson, driving for Chip Ganassi Racing, would finish second and third, respectively.

== Background ==
The layout of Bristol Motor Speedway, the venue where the race was held.

The Bristol Motor Speedway, formerly known as Bristol International Raceway and Bristol Raceway, is a NASCAR short track venue located in Bristol, Tennessee. Constructed in 1960, it held its first NASCAR race on July 30, 1961. Despite its short length, Bristol is among the most popular tracks on the NASCAR schedule because of its distinct features, which include extraordinarily steep banking, an all concrete surface, two pit roads, and stadium-like seating. It has also been named one of the loudest NASCAR tracks.

=== Dash 4 Cash format and eligibility ===
In 2016, NASCAR would announce changes to its Dash 4 Cash format. The format would now include heat races to determine qualifiers. Each driver would qualify for heats in knockout qualifying, with odd-position drivers driving in heat #1, and even-position drivers competing in heat #2. The top two finishers of each heat would compete for the Dash 4 Cash in the main race after the heats.

=== Entry list ===
- (R) denotes rookie driver.
- (i) denotes driver who is ineligible for series driver points.

#	Driver	Team	Make	Sponsor
0	Garrett Smithley	JD Motorsports	Chevrolet	JD Motorsports
1	Elliott Sadler	JR Motorsports	Chevrolet	OneMain Financial
01	Ryan Preece (R)	JD Motorsports	Chevrolet	G&K Services
2	Austin Dillon (i)	Richard Childress Racing	Chevrolet	Rheem
3	Ty Dillon	Richard Childress Racing	Chevrolet	Red Kap
4	Ross Chastain	JD Motorsports	Chevrolet	JD Motorsports
6	Bubba Wallace	Roush Fenway Racing	Ford	Ford EcoBoost
7	Justin Allgaier	JR Motorsports	Chevrolet	Hellmann's, Food City
07	Ray Black Jr. (R)	SS-Green Light Racing	Chevrolet	ScubaLife
10	Matt DiBenedetto (i)	TriStar Motorsports	Toyota	TriStar Motorsports
11	Blake Koch	Kaulig Racing	Chevrolet	LeafFilter Gutter Protection
13	Timmy Hill (i)	MBM Motorsports	Dodge	Truxx, Chris Kyle Memorial Benefit
14	J. J. Yeley	TriStar Motorsports	Toyota	TriStar Motorsports
15	Jeff Green	Rick Ware Racing	Ford	Main Gate Enterprises
16	Ryan Reed	Roush Fenway Racing	Ford	Lilly Diabetes
18	Kyle Busch (i)	Joe Gibbs Racing	Toyota	NOS Energy
19	Daniel Suárez	Joe Gibbs Racing	Toyota	Juniper Networks
20	Erik Jones (R)	Joe Gibbs Racing	Toyota	GameStop, Afterglow
22	Joey Logano (i)	Team Penske	Ford	Fitzgerald Glider Kits
24	Matt Tifft (i)	JGL Racing	Toyota	Arch Day
25	Harrison Rhodes	Rick Ware Racing	Chevrolet	Industrial Piping Solutions, Carport Empire
28	Dakoda Armstrong	JGL Racing	Toyota	WinField United
33	Brandon Jones (R)	Richard Childress Racing	Chevrolet	Check Into Cash
39	Ryan Sieg	RSS Racing	Chevrolet	RSS Racing
40	Carl Long	MBM Motorsports	Dodge	MBM Motorsports
42	Kyle Larson (i)	Chip Ganassi Racing	Chevrolet	Belkin
43	Jeb Burton	Richard Petty Motorsports	Ford	J. Streicher
44	David Starr	TriStar Motorsports	Toyota	Zachry
46	Brandon Gdovic	Precision Performance Motorsports	Chevrolet	Pitt Ohio Express
48	Brennan Poole (R)	Chip Ganassi Racing	Chevrolet	DC Solar
51	Jeremy Clements	Jeremy Clements Racing	Chevrolet	BRT Extrusions, All South Electric
52	Joey Gase	Jimmy Means Racing	Chevrolet	Donate Life Tennessee, Racing 2 Cure
62	Brendan Gaughan	Richard Childress Racing	Chevrolet	South Point Hotel, Casino & Spa
70	Derrike Cope	Derrike Cope Racing	Chevrolet	To The Point Apparel, E-Hydrate
74	Mike Harmon	Mike Harmon Racing	Dodge	Mike Harmon Racing
78	B. J. McLeod (R)	B. J. McLeod Motorsports	Ford	Main Gate Enterprises
88	Kevin Harvick (i)	JR Motorsports	Chevrolet	Hunt Brothers Pizza
89	Morgan Shepherd	Shepherd Racing Ventures	Chevrolet	Courtney Construction, Racing with Jesus
90	Mario Gosselin	King Autosport	Chevrolet	Bucked Up Apparel
93	Josh Wise (i)	RSS Racing	Chevrolet	RSS Racing
97	Ryan Ellis	Obaika Racing	Chevrolet	Vroom! Brands
98	Aric Almirola (i)	Biagi-DenBeste Racing	Ford	Fresh From Florida
Official entry list

== Practice ==
=== First practice ===
The first practice session was held on Friday, April 15, at 12:30 PM EST. The session would last for one hour and 25 minutes. Austin Dillon, driving for Richard Childress Racing, would set the fastest time in the session, with a time of 15.570 and an average speed of 123.237 miles per hour (198.331 km/h).

Pos.	#	Driver	Team	Make	Time	Speed
1	2	Austin Dillon (i)	Richard Childress Racing	Chevrolet	15.570	123.237
2	42	Kyle Larson (i)	Chip Ganassi Racing	Chevrolet	15.588	123.095
3	33	Brandon Jones (R)	Richard Childress Racing	Chevrolet	15.598	123.016
Full first practice results

=== Second and final practice ===
The final practice session, sometimes known as Happy Hour, was held on Friday, April 15, at 3:00 PM EST. The session would last for 55 minutes. Blake Koch, driving for Kaulig Racing, would set the fastest time in the session, with a time of 15.516 and an average speed of 123.666 miles per hour (199.021 km/h).

Pos.	#	Driver	Team	Make	Time	Speed
1	11	Blake Koch	Kaulig Racing	Chevrolet	15.516	123.666
2	18	Kyle Busch (i)	Joe Gibbs Racing	Toyota	15.554	123.364
3	2	Austin Dillon (i)	Richard Childress Racing	Chevrolet	15.555	123.356
Full Happy Hour practice results

== Heat qualifying ==
Qualifying for the two preliminary heat races was held on Saturday, April 16, at 9:30 AM EST. Since Bristol Motor Speedway is under 2 miles (3.2 km) in length, the qualifying system was a multi-car system that included three rounds. The first round was 15 minutes, where every driver would be able to set a lap within the 15 minutes. Then, the second round would consist of the fastest 24 cars in Round 1, and drivers would have 10 minutes to set a lap. Round 3 consisted of the fastest 12 drivers from Round 2, and the drivers would have 5 minutes to set a time. Whoever was fastest in Round 3 would win the pole.

Erik Jones, driving for Joe Gibbs Racing, would win the pole for heat #1, setting a time of 15.239 and an average speed of 125.914 miles per hour (202.639 km/h) in the third round. Meanwhile, Austin Dillon, driving for Richard Childress Racing would win the pole for heat #2, setting a time of 15.284 and an average speed of 125.543 miles per hour (202.042 km/h) in the third round.

Two drivers would fail to qualify: Morgan Shepherd and Carl Long.

=== Full qualifying results ===
Pos.	#	Driver	Team	Make	Time (R1)	Speed (R1)	Time (R2)	Speed (R2)	Time (R3)	Speed (R3)
1	20	Erik Jones (R)	Joe Gibbs Racing	Toyota	15.363	124.897	15.299	125.420	15.239	125.914
2	2	Austin Dillon (i)	Richard Childress Racing	Chevrolet	15.485	123.913	15.383	124.735	15.284	125.543
3	42	Kyle Larson (i)	Chip Ganassi Racing	Chevrolet	15.283	125.551	15.326	125.199	15.337	125.109
4	19	Daniel Suárez	Joe Gibbs Racing	Toyota	15.422	124.420	15.352	124.987	15.347	125.028
5	18	Kyle Busch (i)	Joe Gibbs Racing	Toyota	15.363	124.897	15.464	124.082	15.355	124.963
6	22	Joey Logano (i)	Team Penske	Ford	15.370	124.841	15.456	124.146	15.431	124.347
7	7	Justin Allgaier	JR Motorsports	Chevrolet	15.337	125.109	15.458	124.130	15.440	124.275
8	98	Aric Almirola (i)	Biagi-DenBeste Racing	Ford	15.430	124.355	15.354	124.971	15.440	124.275
9	33	Brandon Jones (R)	Richard Childress Racing	Chevrolet	15.609	122.929	15.453	124.170	15.477	123.978
10	3	Ty Dillon	Richard Childress Racing	Chevrolet	15.466	124.066	15.450	124.194	15.549	123.403
11	4	Ross Chastain	JD Motorsports	Chevrolet	15.499	123.802	15.464	124.082	15.570	123.237
12	88	Kevin Harvick (i)	JR Motorsports	Chevrolet	15.508	123.730	15.426	124.387	15.610	122.921
Eliminated in Round 2
13	62	Brendan Gaughan	Richard Childress Racing	Chevrolet	15.606	122.953	15.472	124.018	-	-
14	11	Blake Koch	Kaulig Racing	Chevrolet	15.584	123.126	15.493	123.849	-	-
15	6	Bubba Wallace	Roush Fenway Racing	Ford	15.531	123.546	15.496	123.826	-	-
16	43	Jeb Burton	Richard Petty Motorsports	Ford	15.257	125.765	15.538	123.491	-	-
17	48	Brennan Poole (R)	Chip Ganassi Racing	Chevrolet	15.550	123.395	15.545	123.435	-	-
18	39	Ryan Sieg	RSS Racing	Chevrolet	15.465	124.074	15.569	123.245	-	-
19	1	Elliott Sadler	JR Motorsports	Chevrolet	15.535	123.515	15.571	123.229	-	-
20	90	Mario Gosselin	King Autosport	Chevrolet	15.576	123.190	15.657	122.552	-	-
21	16	Ryan Reed	Roush Fenway Racing	Ford	15.532	123.539	15.662	122.513	-	-
22	51	Jeremy Clements	Jeremy Clements Racing	Chevrolet	15.594	123.047	15.698	122.232	-	-
23	10	Matt DiBenedetto (i)	TriStar Motorsports	Toyota	15.605	122.961	-	-	-	-
24	93	Josh Wise (i)	RSS Racing	Chevrolet	15.616	122.874	-	-	-	-
Eliminated in Round 1
25	28	Dakoda Armstrong	JGL Racing	Toyota	15.637	122.709	-	-	-	-
26	01	Ryan Preece (R)	JD Motorsports	Chevrolet	15.694	122.263	-	-	-	-
27	15	Jeff Green	Rick Ware Racing	Ford	15.714	122.108	-	-	-	-
28	14	J. J. Yeley	TriStar Motorsports	Toyota	15.726	122.014	-	-	-	-
29	24	Matt Tifft (i)	JGL Racing	Toyota	15.746	121.860	-	-	-	-
30	44	David Starr	TriStar Motorsports	Toyota	15.753	121.805	-	-	-	-
31	46	Brandon Gdovic	Precision Performance Motorsports	Chevrolet	15.754	121.798	-	-	-	-
32	78	B. J. McLeod (R)	B. J. McLeod Motorsports	Ford	15.756	121.782	-	-	-	-
33	52	Joey Gase	Jimmy Means Racing	Chevrolet	15.775	121.635	-	-	-	-
34	07	Ray Black Jr. (R)	SS-Green Light Racing	Chevrolet	15.803	121.420	-	-	-	-
35	25	Harrison Rhodes	Rick Ware Racing	Chevrolet	15.812	121.351	-	-	-	-
36	0	Garrett Smithley (R)	JD Motorsports	Chevrolet	15.827	121.236	-	-	-	-
37	13	Timmy Hill (i)	MBM Motorsports	Dodge	15.934	120.422	-	-	-	-
38	97	Ryan Ellis	Obaika Racing	Chevrolet	16.018	119.790	-	-	-	-
39	74	Mike Harmon	Mike Harmon Racing	Dodge	16.054	119.522	-	-	-	-
40	70	Derrike Cope	Derrike Cope Racing	Chevrolet	16.311	117.638	-	-	-	-
Failed to qualify
41	89	Morgan Shepherd	Shepherd Racing Ventures	Chevrolet	15.776	121.628	-	-	-	-
42	40	Carl Long	MBM Motorsports	Dodge	15.844	121.106	-	-	-	-
Official qualifying results
Heat #1 lineup
Heat #2 lineup

== Heat #1 results ==
Heat #1 was held on Saturday, April 16, at 12:30 PM EST. The race took 50 laps to complete. Erik Jones, driving for Joe Gibbs Racing, would dominate the race to win the heat and the overall pole. Kyle Larson would complete the two drivers in the heat eligible for the Dash 4 Cash.

Fin	St	#	Driver	Team	Make	Laps	Led	Status
1	1	20	Erik Jones (R)	Joe Gibbs Racing	Toyota	50	50	running
2	2	42	Kyle Larson (i)	Chip Ganassi Racing	Chevrolet	50	0	running
3	3	18	Kyle Busch (i)	Joe Gibbs Racing	Toyota	50	0	running
4	4	7	Justin Allgaier	JR Motorsports	Chevrolet	50	0	running
5	5	33	Brandon Jones (R)	Richard Childress Racing	Chevrolet	50	0	running
6	7	62	Brendan Gaughan	Richard Childress Racing	Chevrolet	50	0	running
7	8	6	Bubba Wallace	Roush Fenway Racing	Ford	50	0	running
8	10	1	Elliott Sadler	JR Motorsports	Chevrolet	50	0	running
9	11	16	Ryan Reed	Roush Fenway Racing	Ford	50	0	running
10	9	48	Brennan Poole (R)	Chip Ganassi Racing	Chevrolet	49	0	running
11	6	4	Ross Chastain	JD Motorsports	Chevrolet	49	0	running
12	14	15	Jeff Green	Rick Ware Racing	Ford	49	0	running
13	15	24	Matt Tifft (i)	JGL Racing	Toyota	49	0	running
14	16	46	Brandon Gdovic	Precision Performance Motorsports	Chevrolet	49	0	running
15	18	25	Harrison Rhodes	Rick Ware Racing	Chevrolet	49	0	running
16	13	28	Dakoda Armstrong	JGL Racing	Toyota	49	0	running
17	17	52	Joey Gase	Jimmy Means Racing	Chevrolet	48	0	running
18	20	74	Mike Harmon	Mike Harmon Racing	Dodge	46	0	running
19	19	13	Timmy Hill (i)	MBM Motorsports	Dodge	14	0	radiator
20	12	10	Matt DiBenedetto (i)	TriStar Motorsports	Toyota	3	0	vibration
Official Heat #1 results

== Heat #2 results ==
Heat #2 was held on Saturday, April 16, at approximately 1:10 PM EST. The race took 50 laps to complete. Austin Dillon, driving for Richard Childress Racing, would dominate the race to win the outside pole. Ty Dillon would complete the two drivers in the heat eligible for the Dash 4 Cash.

Fin	St	#	Driver	Team	Make	Laps	Led	Status
1	1	2	Austin Dillon (i)	Richard Childress Racing	Chevrolet	50	50	running
2	5	3	Ty Dillon	Richard Childress Racing	Chevrolet	50	0	running
3	3	22	Joey Logano (i)	Team Penske	Ford	50	0	running
4	2	19	Daniel Suárez	Joe Gibbs Racing	Toyota	50	0	running
5	6	88	Kevin Harvick (i)	JR Motorsports	Chevrolet	50	0	running
6	4	98	Aric Almirola (i)	Biagi-DenBeste Racing	Ford	50	0	running
7	8	43	Jeb Burton	Richard Petty Motorsports	Ford	50	0	running
8	7	11	Blake Koch	Kaulig Racing	Chevrolet	50	0	running
9	11	51	Jeremy Clements	Jeremy Clements Racing	Chevrolet	50	0	running
10	9	39	Ryan Sieg	RSS Racing	Chevrolet	50	0	running
11	10	90	Mario Gosselin	King Autosport	Chevrolet	49	0	running
12	15	44	David Starr	TriStar Motorsports	Toyota	49	0	running
13	13	01	Ryan Preece (R)	JD Motorsports	Chevrolet	49	0	running
14	16	78	B. J. McLeod (R)	B. J. McLeod Motorsports	Ford	48	0	running
15	18	0	Garrett Smithley (R)	JD Motorsports	Chevrolet	48	0	running
16	19	97	Ryan Ellis	Obaika Racing	Chevrolet	44	0	running
17	20	70	Derrike Cope	Derrike Cope Racing	Chevrolet	35	0	running
18	17	07	Ray Black Jr. (R)	SS-Green Light Racing	Chevrolet	31	0	running
19	14	14	J. J. Yeley	TriStar Motorsports	Toyota	17	0	vibration
20	12	93	Josh Wise (i)	RSS Racing	Chevrolet	9	0	brakes
Official Heat #2 results

== Main race lineup ==
Pos.	#	Driver	Team	Make
1	20	Erik Jones (R)	Joe Gibbs Racing	Toyota
2	2	Austin Dillon (i)	Richard Childress Racing	Chevrolet
3	42	Kyle Larson (i)	Chip Ganassi Racing	Chevrolet
4	3	Ty Dillon	Richard Childress Racing	Chevrolet
5	18	Kyle Busch (i)	Joe Gibbs Racing	Toyota
6	22	Joey Logano (i)	Team Penske	Ford
7	7	Justin Allgaier	JR Motorsports	Chevrolet
8	19	Daniel Suárez	Joe Gibbs Racing	Toyota
9	33	Brandon Jones (R)	Richard Childress Racing	Chevrolet
10	88	Kevin Harvick (i)	JR Motorsports	Chevrolet
11	62	Brendan Gaughan	Richard Childress Racing	Chevrolet
12	98	Aric Almirola (i)	Biagi-DenBeste Racing	Ford
13	6	Bubba Wallace	Roush Fenway Racing	Ford
14	43	Jeb Burton	Richard Petty Motorsports	Ford
15	1	Elliott Sadler	JR Motorsports	Chevrolet
16	11	Blake Koch	Kaulig Racing	Chevrolet
17	16	Ryan Reed	Roush Fenway Racing	Ford
18	51	Jeremy Clements	Jeremy Clements Racing	Chevrolet
19	48	Brennan Poole (R)	Chip Ganassi Racing	Chevrolet
20	39	Ryan Sieg	RSS Racing	Chevrolet
21	4	Ross Chastain	JD Motorsports	Chevrolet
22	90	Mario Gosselin	King Autosport	Chevrolet
23	15	Jeff Green	Rick Ware Racing	Ford
24	44	David Starr	TriStar Motorsports	Toyota
25	24	Matt Tifft (i)	JGL Racing	Toyota
26	01	Ryan Preece (R)	JD Motorsports	Chevrolet
27	46	Brandon Gdovic	Precision Performance Motorsports	Chevrolet
28	78	B. J. McLeod (R)	B. J. McLeod Motorsports	Ford
29	25	Harrison Rhodes	Rick Ware Racing	Chevrolet
30	0	Garrett Smithley (R)	JD Motorsports	Chevrolet
31	28	Dakoda Armstrong	JGL Racing	Toyota
32	97	Ryan Ellis	Obaika Racing	Chevrolet
33	52	Joey Gase	Jimmy Means Racing	Chevrolet
34	70	Derrike Cope	Derrike Cope Racing	Chevrolet
35	74	Mike Harmon	Mike Harmon Racing	Dodge
36	07	Ray Black Jr. (R)	SS-Green Light Racing	Chevrolet
37	13	Timmy Hill (i)	MBM Motorsports	Dodge
38	14	J. J. Yeley	TriStar Motorsports	Toyota
39	10	Matt DiBenedetto (i)	TriStar Motorsports	Toyota
40	93	Josh Wise (i)	RSS Racing	Chevrolet
Official main race lineup

== Main race results ==
Fin	St	#	Driver	Team	Make	Laps	Led	Status	Pts
1	1	20	Erik Jones (R)	Joe Gibbs Racing	Toyota	200	62	running	44
2	5	18	Kyle Busch (i)	Joe Gibbs Racing	Toyota	200	43	running	0
3	3	42	Kyle Larson (i)	Chip Ganassi Racing	Chevrolet	200	94	running	0
4	2	2	Austin Dillon (i)	Richard Childress Racing	Chevrolet	200	0	running	0
5	7	7	Justin Allgaier	JR Motorsports	Chevrolet	200	0	running	36
6	8	19	Daniel Suárez	Joe Gibbs Racing	Toyota	200	0	running	35
7	4	3	Ty Dillon	Richard Childress Racing	Chevrolet	200	0	running	34
8	10	88	Kevin Harvick (i)	JR Motorsports	Chevrolet	200	0	running	0
9	6	22	Joey Logano (i)	Team Penske	Ford	200	0	running	0
10	12	98	Aric Almirola (i)	Biagi-DenBeste Racing	Ford	200	0	running	0
11	9	33	Brandon Jones (R)	Richard Childress Racing	Chevrolet	199	0	running	30
12	14	43	Jeb Burton	Richard Petty Motorsports	Ford	199	0	running	29
13	19	48	Brennan Poole (R)	Chip Ganassi Racing	Chevrolet	199	0	running	28
14	20	39	Ryan Sieg	RSS Racing	Chevrolet	199	0	running	27
15	15	1	Elliott Sadler	JR Motorsports	Chevrolet	199	0	running	26
16	11	62	Brendan Gaughan	Richard Childress Racing	Chevrolet	198	0	running	25
17	24	44	David Starr	TriStar Motorsports	Toyota	198	0	running	24
18	27	46	Brandon Gdovic	Precision Performance Motorsports	Chevrolet	197	0	running	23
19	26	01	Ryan Preece (R)	JD Motorsports	Chevrolet	197	0	running	22
20	36	07	Ray Black Jr. (R)	SS-Green Light Racing	Chevrolet	197	0	running	21
21	17	16	Ryan Reed	Roush Fenway Racing	Ford	197	0	running	20
22	21	4	Ross Chastain	JD Motorsports	Chevrolet	197	0	running	19
23	25	24	Matt Tifft (i)	JGL Racing	Toyota	197	0	running	0
24	22	90	Mario Gosselin	King Autosport	Chevrolet	197	0	running	17
25	13	6	Bubba Wallace	Roush Fenway Racing	Ford	196	0	running	16
26	29	25	Harrison Rhodes	Rick Ware Racing	Chevrolet	196	0	running	15
27	23	15	Jeff Green	Rick Ware Racing	Ford	196	1	running	15
28	28	78	B. J. McLeod (R)	B. J. McLeod Motorsports	Ford	196	0	running	13
29	30	0	Garrett Smithley (R)	JD Motorsports	Chevrolet	195	0	running	12
30	31	28	Dakoda Armstrong	JGL Racing	Toyota	195	0	running	11
31	33	52	Joey Gase	Jimmy Means Racing	Chevrolet	193	0	running	10
32	37	13	Timmy Hill (i)	MBM Motorsports	Dodge	193	0	running	0
33	18	51	Jeremy Clements	Jeremy Clements Racing	Chevrolet	192	0	ignition	8
34	34	70	Derrike Cope	Derrike Cope Racing	Chevrolet	192	0	running	7
35	32	97	Ryan Ellis	Obaika Racing	Chevrolet	187	0	running	6
36	35	74	Mike Harmon	Mike Harmon Racing	Dodge	182	0	running	5
37	16	11	Blake Koch	Kaulig Racing	Chevrolet	133	0	running	4
38	38	14	J. J. Yeley	TriStar Motorsports	Toyota	74	0	electrical	3
39	40	93	Josh Wise (i)	RSS Racing	Chevrolet	21	0	transmission	0
40	39	10	Matt DiBenedetto (i)	TriStar Motorsports	Toyota	4	0	vibration	0
Failed to qualify
41		89	Morgan Shepherd	Shepherd Racing Ventures	Chevrolet				
42		40	Carl Long	MBM Motorsports	Dodge				
Official race results

== Standings after the race ==
Drivers' Championship standings

Pos	Driver	Points
1	Daniel Suárez	242
2	Erik Jones	236 (-6)
3	Justin Allgaier	234 (–8)
4	Elliott Sadler	232 (–10)
5	Brandon Jones	223 (–19)
6	Ty Dillon	221 (-21)
7	Brendan Gaughan	208 (-34)
8	Brennan Poole	180 (-62)
9	Ryan Reed	180 (-62)
10	Bubba Wallace	176 (-66)
11	Ryan Sieg	157 (-85)
12	Jeb Burton	156 (-86)
Official driver's standings

- Note: Only the first 12 positions are included for the driver standings.

Previous race: 2016 O'Reilly Auto Parts 300	NASCAR Xfinity Series; 2016 season	Next race: 2016 ToyotaCare 250
