= 2016 ToyotaCare 250 =

Eighth race of the 2016 NASCAR Xfinity Series

Race details
- Race 7 of 33 in the 2016 NASCAR Xfinity Series
- Date: April 23, 2016
- Official name: 30th Annual ToyotaCare 250
- Location: Richmond International Raceway, Richmond, Virginia
- Course: Permanent racing facility
- Course length: 0.75 miles (1.21 km)
- Distance: 149 laps, 111 mi (179 km)
- Scheduled distance: 140 laps, 105 mi (168 km)
- Average speed: 93.623 miles per hour (150.672 km/h)

Pole position
Driver	Erik Jones	Joe Gibbs Racing
- Grid positions set by heat results

Most laps led
Driver	Dale Earnhardt Jr.	JR Motorsports
- Laps: 128

Winner
No. 88	Dale Earnhardt Jr.	JR Motorsports

Television in the United States
- Network: FS1
- Announcers: Adam Alexander, Joey Logano, and Michael Waltrip

Radio in the United States
- Radio: MRN

ToyotaCare 250

The 2016 ToyotaCare 250 was the eighth stock car race of the 2016 NASCAR Xfinity Series season and the 30th iteration of the event. The race was held on Saturday, April 23, 2016, in Richmond, Virginia at Richmond International Raceway, a 0.75 miles (1.21 km) permanent tri-oval shaped racetrack. The race was increased from 140 laps to 149 laps, due to a NASCAR overtime finish. The first 70 laps would be split into two 35-lap heats of 20 cars. Dale Earnhardt Jr., driving for his team, JR Motorsports, would charge to the lead on the final restart, and held off Ty Dillon for his 24th career NASCAR Xfinity Series win, his first of the season, and his first win since 2010. This would also end up being his last win in the Xfinity Series. Junior would also dominate the race as well, leading 128 of the 149 laps. To fill out the podium, Elliott Sadler, driving for JR Motorsports, would finish in third, respectively.

== Background ==
The layout of Richmond International Raceway, the venue where the race was held.

Richmond International Raceway is a 0.75 miles (1.21 km), D-shaped, asphalt race track located just outside Richmond, Virginia in unincorporated Henrico County. It hosts the NASCAR Sprint Cup Series, NASCAR Xfinity Series and the NASCAR Camping World Truck Series. Known as "America's premier short track", it has formerly hosted events such as the International Race of Champions, Denny Hamlin Short Track Showdown, and the USAC sprint car series. Due to Richmond Raceway's unique "D" shape which allows drivers to reach high speeds, its racing grooves, and proclivity for contact Richmond is a favorite among NASCAR drivers and fans.

=== Dash 4 Cash format and eligibility ===
In 2016, NASCAR would announce changes to its Dash 4 Cash format. The format would now include heat races to determine qualifiers. Each driver would qualify for heats in knockout qualifying, with odd-position drivers driving in heat #1, and even-position drivers competing in heat #2. The top two finishers of each heat would compete for the Dash 4 Cash in the main race after the heats.

=== Entry list ===
- (R) denotes rookie driver.
- (i) denotes driver who is ineligible for series driver points.

#	Driver	Team	Make	Sponsor
0	Garrett Smithley (R)	JD Motorsports	Chevrolet	JD Motorsports
01	Ryan Preece (R)	JD Motorsports	Chevrolet	G&K Services
1	Elliott Sadler	JR Motorsports	Chevrolet	OneMain Financial
2	Austin Dillon (i)	Richard Childress Racing	Chevrolet	Ruud
3	Ty Dillon	Richard Childress Racing	Chevrolet	WESCO
4	Ross Chastain	JD Motorsports	Chevrolet	Florida Watermelon Association
5	Cole Custer (i)	JR Motorsports	Chevrolet	Haas Automation
6	Bubba Wallace	Roush Fenway Racing	Ford	Ford EcoBoost
07	Ray Black Jr. (R)	SS-Green Light Racing	Chevrolet	Scuba Life
7	Justin Allgaier	JR Motorsports	Chevrolet	BRANDT
11	Blake Koch	Kaulig Racing	Chevrolet	LeafFilter Gutter Protection
13	Timmy Hill (i)	MBM Motorsports	Dodge	Braille Battery, Grafoid
14	Jeff Green	TriStar Motorsports	Toyota	TriStar Motorsports
15	Travis Kvapil	Rick Ware Racing	Ford	CorvetteParts.net
16	Ryan Reed	Roush Fenway Racing	Ford	Lilly Diabetes, American Diabetes Association
18	Matt Tifft (i)	Joe Gibbs Racing	Toyota	NOS Energy Drink
19	Daniel Suárez	Joe Gibbs Racing	Toyota	Juniper Networks
20	Erik Jones (R)	Joe Gibbs Racing	Toyota	Hisense
21	Spencer Gallagher (i)	GMS Racing	Chevrolet	Water Pulse
22	Brad Keselowski (i)	Team Penske	Ford	Discount Tire
23	Harrison Rhodes	Rick Ware Racing	Chevrolet	Lilly Trucking, CarportEmpire.com
28	Dakoda Armstrong	JGL Racing	Toyota	WinField
33	Brandon Jones (R)	Richard Childress Racing	Chevrolet	Chevrolet Military Discount
39	Ryan Sieg	RSS Racing	Chevrolet	RSS Racing
40	Carl Long	MBM Motorsports	Dodge	TLC Vacation Club
42	Justin Marks	Chip Ganassi Racing	Chevrolet	Katerra
43	Jeb Burton	Richard Petty Motorsports	Ford	J. Striecher
44	J. J. Yeley	TriStar Motorsports	Toyota	Zachry
48	Brennan Poole (R)	Chip Ganassi Racing	Chevrolet	DC Solar
51	Jeremy Clements	Jeremy Clements Racing	Chevrolet	RepairableVehicles.com
52	Joey Gase	Jimmy Means Racing	Chevrolet	Donate Life Virginia
62	Brendan Gaughan	Richard Childress Racing	Chevrolet	South Point Hotel, Casino & Spa
70	Derrike Cope	Derrike Cope Racing	Chevrolet	Acredale Vending
74	Mike Harmon	Mike Harmon Racing	Dodge	Mike Harmon Racing
78	B. J. McLeod (R)	B. J. McLeod Motorsports	Ford	Main Gate
88	Dale Earnhardt Jr. (i)	JR Motorsports	Chevrolet	Hellmann's
89	Morgan Shepherd	Shepherd Racing Ventures	Chevrolet	Shepherd Racing Ventures
90	Todd Peck	B. J. McLeod Motorsports	Ford	BuckedUp Apparel
93	Josh Wise (i)	RSS Racing	Chevrolet	RSS Racing
97	Ryan Ellis	Obaika Racing	Chevrolet	Vroom! Brands
Official entry list

== Practice ==
The lone practice session was held on Saturday, April 23, at 9:00 AM EST. The session would last for one hour and 25 minutes. Justin Allgaier, driving for JR Motorsports, would set the fastest time in the session, with a lap of 22.282 and an average speed of 121.174 mph (195.011 km/h).

Pos.	#	Driver	Team	Make	Time	Speed
1	7	Justin Allgaier	JR Motorsports	Chevrolet	22.282	121.174
2	2	Austin Dillon (i)	Richard Childress Racing	Chevrolet	22.389	120.595
3	22	Brad Keselowski (i)	Team Penske	Ford	22.392	120.579
Full first practice results

== Heat #1 results ==
Qualifying would be based on two different heat races, which would determine the starting lineup. Heat #1 was held on Saturday, April 23, at 12:30 PM EST. The race took 35 laps to complete. Erik Jones, driving for Joe Gibbs Racing, would dominate the race and lead every lap to win the heat and the pole for the race. Brennan Poole would complete the two drivers in the heat eligible for the Dash 4 Cash.

Fin	St	#	Driver	Team	Make	Laps	Led	Status
1	3	20	Erik Jones (R)	Joe Gibbs Racing	Toyota	35	35	Running
2	2	88	Dale Earnhardt Jr. (i)	JR Motorsports	Chevrolet	35	0	Running
3	1	18	Matt Tifft (i)	Joe Gibbs Racing	Toyota	35	0	Running
4	7	48	Brennan Poole (R)	Chip Ganassi Racing	Chevrolet	35	0	Running
5	4	1	Elliott Sadler	JR Motorsports	Chevrolet	35	0	Running
6	8	6	Bubba Wallace	Roush Fenway Racing	Ford	35	0	Running
7	5	33	Brandon Jones (R)	Richard Childress Racing	Chevrolet	35	0	Running
8	6	62	Brendan Gaughan	Richard Childress Racing	Chevrolet	35	0	Running
9	15	5	Cole Custer (i)	JR Motorsports	Chevrolet	35	0	Running
10	12	44	J. J. Yeley	TriStar Motorsports	Toyota	35	0	Running
11	9	43	Jeb Burton	Richard Petty Motorsports	Ford	35	0	Running
12	11	51	Jeremy Clements	Jeremy Clements Racing	Chevrolet	35	0	Running
13	10	28	Dakoda Armstrong	JGL Racing	Toyota	35	0	Running
14	14	14	Jeff Green	TriStar Motorsports	Toyota	35	0	Running
15	13	07	Ray Black Jr. (R)	SS-Green Light Racing	Chevrolet	34	0	Running
16	16	25	Harrison Rhodes	Rick Ware Racing	Chevrolet	34	0	Running
17	17	97	Ryan Ellis	Obaika Racing	Chevrolet	34	0	Running
18	19	40	Carl Long	MBM Motorsports	Dodge	31	0	Running
19	18	70	Derrike Cope	Derrike Cope Racing	Chevrolet	27	0	Running
20	20	89	Morgan Shepherd	Shepherd Racing Ventures	Chevrolet	11	0	Overheating
Official Heat #1 results

== Heat #2 results ==
Heat #2 was held on Saturday, April 23, at approximately 1:10 PM EST. The race took 35 laps to complete. Ty Dillon, driving for Richard Childress Racing, would dominate the race and lead every lap to win the outside pole. Justin Allgaier would complete the two drivers in the heat eligible for the Dash 4 Cash.

Fin	St	#	Driver	Team	Make	Laps	Led	Status
1	5	3	Ty Dillon	Richard Childress Racing	Chevrolet	35	35	Running
2	3	7	Justin Allgaier	JR Motorsports	Chevrolet	35	0	Running
3	2	19	Daniel Suárez	Joe Gibbs Racing	Toyota	35	0	Running
4	4	22	Brad Keselowski (i)	Team Penske	Ford	35	0	Running
5	1	2	Austin Dillon (i)	Richard Childress Racing	Chevrolet	35	0	Running
6	6	42	Justin Marks	Chip Ganassi Racing	Chevrolet	35	0	Running
7	9	4	Ross Chastain	JD Motorsports	Chevrolet	35	0	Running
8	10	11	Blake Koch	Kaulig Racing	Chevrolet	35	0	Running
9	7	16	Ryan Reed	Roush Fenway Racing	Ford	35	0	Running
10	8	39	Ryan Sieg	RSS Racing	Chevrolet	35	0	Running
11	20	21	Spencer Gallagher (i)	GMS Racing	Chevrolet	35	0	Running
12	11	01	Ryan Preece (R)	JD Motorsports	Chevrolet	35	0	Running
13	12	0	Garrett Smithley (R)	JD Motorsports	Chevrolet	34	0	Running
14	13	78	B. J. McLeod (R)	B. J. McLeod Motorsports	Ford	34	0	Running
15	16	15	Travis Kvapil	Rick Ware Racing	Ford	34	0	Running
16	15	52	Joey Gase	Jimmy Means Racing	Chevrolet	34	0	Running
17	17	74	Mike Harmon	Mike Harmon Racing	Dodge	33	0	Running
18	14	90	Todd Peck	B. J. McLeod Motorsports	Ford	33	0	Running
19	18	13	Timmy Hill (i)	MBM Motorsports	Dodge	26	0	Running
20	19	93	Josh Wise (i)	RSS Racing	Chevrolet	8	0	Brakes
Official Heat #2 results

== Main race lineup ==
Pos.	#	Driver	Team	Make
1	20	Erik Jones (R)	Joe Gibbs Racing	Toyota
2	3	Ty Dillon	Richard Childress Racing	Chevrolet
3	88	Dale Earnhardt Jr. (i)	JR Motorsports	Chevrolet
4	7	Justin Allgaier	JR Motorsports	Chevrolet
5	18	Matt Tifft (i)	Joe Gibbs Racing	Toyota
6	19	Daniel Suárez	Joe Gibbs Racing	Toyota
7	48	Brennan Poole (R)	Chip Ganassi Racing	Chevrolet
8	22	Brad Keselowski (i)	Team Penske	Ford
9	1	Elliott Sadler	JR Motorsports	Chevrolet
10	2	Austin Dillon (i)	Richard Childress Racing	Chevrolet
11	6	Bubba Wallace	Roush Fenway Racing	Ford
12	42	Justin Marks	Chip Ganassi Racing	Chevrolet
13	33	Brandon Jones (R)	Richard Childress Racing	Chevrolet
14	4	Ross Chastain	JD Motorsports	Chevrolet
15	62	Brendan Gaughan	Richard Childress Racing	Chevrolet
16	11	Blake Koch	Kaulig Racing	Chevrolet
17	5	Cole Custer (i)	JR Motorsports	Chevrolet
18	16	Ryan Reed	Roush Fenway Racing	Ford
19	44	J. J. Yeley	TriStar Motorsports	Toyota
20	39	Ryan Sieg	RSS Racing	Chevrolet
21	43	Jeb Burton	Richard Petty Motorsports	Ford
22	21	Spencer Gallagher (i)	GMS Racing	Chevrolet
23	51	Jeremy Clements	Jeremy Clements Racing	Chevrolet
24	01	Ryan Preece (R)	JD Motorsports	Chevrolet
25	28	Dakoda Armstrong	JGL Racing	Toyota
26	0	Garrett Smithley (R)	JD Motorsports	Chevrolet
27	14	Jeff Green	TriStar Motorsports	Toyota
28	78	B. J. McLeod (R)	B. J. McLeod Motorsports	Ford
29	07	Ray Black Jr. (R)	SS-Green Light Racing	Chevrolet
30	15	Travis Kvapil (i)	Rick Ware Racing	Ford
31	25	Harrison Rhodes	Rick Ware Racing	Chevrolet
32	52	Joey Gase	Jimmy Means Racing	Chevrolet
33	97	Ryan Ellis	Obaika Racing	Chevrolet
34	74	Mike Harmon	Mike Harmon Racing	Dodge
35	40	Carl Long	MBM Motorsports	Dodge
36	90	Todd Peck	B. J. McLeod Motorsports	Ford
37	70	Derrike Cope	Derrike Cope Racing	Chevrolet
38	13	Timmy Hill (i)	MBM Motorsports	Dodge
39	89	Morgan Shepherd	Shepherd Racing Ventures	Chevrolet
40	93	Josh Wise (i)	RSS Racing	Chevrolet
Official main race lineup

== Main race results ==
Fin	St	#	Driver	Team	Make	Laps	Led	Status	Pts
1	3	88	Dale Earnhardt Jr. (i)	JR Motorsports	Chevrolet	149	128	Running	0
2	2	3	Ty Dillon	Richard Childress Racing	Chevrolet	149	0	Running	39
3	9	1	Elliott Sadler	JR Motorsports	Chevrolet	149	0	Running	38
4	6	19	Daniel Suárez	Joe Gibbs Racing	Toyota	149	0	Running	37
5	10	2	Austin Dillon (i)	Richard Childress Racing	Chevrolet	149	0	Running	0
6	17	5	Cole Custer (i)	JR Motorsports	Chevrolet	149	0	Running	0
7	15	62	Brendan Gaughan	Richard Childress Racing	Chevrolet	149	0	Running	34
8	16	11	Blake Koch	Kaulig Racing	Chevrolet	149	0	Running	33
9	8	22	Brad Keselowski (i)	Team Penske	Ford	149	0	Running	0
10	7	48	Brennan Poole (R)	Chip Ganassi Racing	Chevrolet	149	3	Running	32
11	18	16	Ryan Reed	Roush Fenway Racing	Ford	149	0	Running	30
12	19	44	J. J. Yeley	TriStar Motorsports	Toyota	149	0	Running	29
13	12	42	Justin Marks	Chip Ganassi Racing	Chevrolet	149	0	Running	28
14	25	28	Dakoda Armstrong	JGL Racing	Toyota	149	0	Running	27
15	13	33	Brandon Jones (R)	Richard Childress Racing	Chevrolet	148	0	Running	26
16	11	6	Bubba Wallace	Roush Fenway Racing	Ford	148	0	Running	25
17	22	21	Spencer Gallagher (i)	GMS Racing	Chevrolet	148	0	Running	0
18	14	4	Ross Chastain	JD Motorsports	Chevrolet	148	0	Running	23
19	21	43	Jeb Burton	Richard Petty Motorsports	Ford	148	0	Running	22
20	26	0	Garrett Smithley (R)	JD Motorsports	Chevrolet	147	0	Running	21
21	20	39	Ryan Sieg	RSS Racing	Chevrolet	147	0	Running	20
22	23	51	Jeremy Clements	Jeremy Clements Racing	Chevrolet	147	0	Running	19
23	24	01	Ryan Preece (R)	JD Motorsports	Chevrolet	146	0	Running	18
24	29	07	Ray Black Jr. (R)	SS-Green Light Racing	Chevrolet	146	0	Running	17
25	30	15	Travis Kvapil	Rick Ware Racing	Ford	146	0	Running	16
26	32	52	Joey Gase	Jimmy Means Racing	Chevrolet	146	0	Running	15
27	31	25	Harrison Rhodes	Rick Ware Racing	Chevrolet	146	0	Running	14
28	28	78	B. J. McLeod (R)	B. J. McLeod Motorsports	Ford	146	0	Running	13
29	33	97	Ryan Ellis	Obaika Racing	Chevrolet	145	0	Running	12
30	37	70	Derrike Cope	Derrike Cope Racing	Chevrolet	144	0	Running	11
31	38	13	Timmy Hill (i)	MBM Motorsports	Dodge	143	0	Running	0
32	36	90	Todd Peck	B. J. McLeod Motorsports	Ford	143	0	Running	9
33	5	18	Matt Tifft (i)	Joe Gibbs Racing	Toyota	135	0	Accident	0
34	1	20	Erik Jones (R)	Joe Gibbs Racing	Toyota	134	17	Accident	8
35	4	7	Justin Allgaier	JR Motorsports	Chevrolet	134	1	Accident	7
36	34	74	Mike Harmon	Mike Harmon Racing	Dodge	123	0	Accident	5
37	27	14	Jeff Green	TriStar Motorsports	Toyota	104	0	Brakes	4
38	35	40	Carl Long	MBM Motorsports	Dodge	17	0	Brakes	3
39	39	89	Morgan Shepherd	Shepherd Racing Ventures	Chevrolet	12	0	Suspension	2
40	40	93	Josh Wise (i)	RSS Racing	Chevrolet	7	0	Transmission	0
Official race results

== Standings after the race ==
Drivers' Championship standings

	Pos	Driver	Points
	1	Daniel Suárez	279
2	2	Elliott Sadler	270 (-9)
3	3	Ty Dillon	260 (–19)
1	4	Brandon Jones	249 (–30)
3	5	Erik Jones	244 (–35)
1	6	Brendan Gaughan	242 (–37)
4	7	Justin Allgaier	241 (–38)
	8	Brennan Poole	212 (–67)
	9	Ryan Reed	210 (–69)
	10	Bubba Wallace	201 (–78)
1	11	Jeb Burton	178 (–101)
1	12	Ryan Sieg	177 (–102)
Official driver's standings

- Note: Only the first 12 positions are included for the driver standings.

Previous race: 2016 Fitzgerald Glider Kits 300	NASCAR Xfinity Series; 2016 season	Next race: 2016 Sparks Energy 300
