= 2017 Overton's 200 =

17th race of the 2017 NASCAR Xfinity Series

Race details
- Race 17 of 33 in the 2017 NASCAR Xfinity Series
- Date: July 15, 2017
- Official name: 28th Annual Overton's 200
- Location: Loudon, New Hampshire, New Hampshire Motor Speedway
- Course: Permanent racing facility
- Course length: 1.058 miles (1.703 km)
- Distance: 200 laps, 211.6 mi (340.537 km)
- Scheduled distance: 200 laps, 211.6 mi (340.537 km)
- Average speed: 109.276 miles per hour (175.863 km/h)

Pole position
Driver	Kyle Busch	Joe Gibbs Racing
- Time: 29.445

Most laps led
Driver	Brad Keselowski	Team Penske
- Laps: 102

Winner
No. 18	Kyle Busch	Joe Gibbs Racing

Television in the United States
- Network: NBCSN
- Announcers: Rick Allen, Jeff Burton, Steve Letarte

Radio in the United States
- Radio: Performance Racing Network

The 2017 Overton's 200 was the 17th stock car race of the 2017 NASCAR Xfinity Series season and the 28th iteration of the event. The race was held on Saturday, July 15, 2017, in Loudon, New Hampshire, at New Hampshire Motor Speedway a 1.058 miles (1.703 km) permanent, oval-shaped, low-banked racetrack. The race took the scheduled 200 laps to complete. At race's end, Kyle Busch, driving for Joe Gibbs Racing, would dominate late in the race to win his 89th career NASCAR Xfinity Series win and his third of the season. To fill out the podium, Ryan Preece of Joe Gibbs Racing and William Byron of JR Motorsports would finish second and third, respectively.

== Entry list ==
- (R) denotes rookie driver.
- (i) denotes driver who is ineligible for series driver points.

#	Driver	Team	Make
0	Garrett Smithley	JD Motorsports	Chevrolet
00	Cole Custer (R)	Stewart–Haas Racing	Ford
1	Elliott Sadler	JR Motorsports	Chevrolet
01	Harrison Rhodes	JD Motorsports	Chevrolet
2	Ben Kennedy (R)	Richard Childress Racing	Chevrolet
3	Ty Dillon (i)	Richard Childress Racing	Chevrolet
4	Ross Chastain	JD Motorsports	Chevrolet
5	Michael Annett	JR Motorsports	Chevrolet
7	Justin Allgaier	JR Motorsports	Chevrolet
07	Spencer Boyd	SS-Green Light Racing	Chevrolet
8	B. J. McLeod	B. J. McLeod Motorsports	Chevrolet
9	William Byron (R)	JR Motorsports	Chevrolet
11	Blake Koch	Kaulig Racing	Chevrolet
13	Carl Long	MBM Motorsports	Chevrolet
14	J. J. Yeley	TriStar Motorsports	Toyota
15	Reed Sorenson (i)	JD Motorsports	Chevrolet
16	Ryan Reed	Roush Fenway Racing	Ford
18	Kyle Busch (i)	Joe Gibbs Racing	Toyota
19	Matt Tifft (R)	Joe Gibbs Racing	Toyota
20	Ryan Preece	Joe Gibbs Racing	Toyota
21	Daniel Hemric (R)	Richard Childress Racing	Chevrolet
22	Brad Keselowski (i)	Team Penske	Ford
23	Spencer Gallagher (R)	GMS Racing	Chevrolet
24	Dylan Lupton	JGL Racing	Toyota
28	Dakoda Armstrong	JGL Racing	Toyota
33	Brandon Jones	Richard Childress Racing	Chevrolet
39	Ryan Sieg	RSS Racing	Chevrolet
40	Timmy Hill	MBM Motorsports	Dodge
42	Kyle Larson (i)	Chip Ganassi Racing	Chevrolet
48	Brennan Poole	Chip Ganassi Racing	Chevrolet
51	Jeremy Clements	Jeremy Clements Racing	Chevrolet
52	Joey Gase	Jimmy Means Racing	Chevrolet
62	Brendan Gaughan	Richard Childress Racing	Chevrolet
72	John Jackson	MBM Motorsports	Dodge
74	Mike Harmon	Mike Harmon Racing	Dodge
78	Tommy Joe Martins	B. J. McLeod Motorsports	Chevrolet
89	Morgan Shepherd	Shepherd Racing Ventures	Chevrolet
90	Martin Roy	King Autosport	Chevrolet
93	Jeff Green	RSS Racing	Chevrolet
99	David Starr	B. J. McLeod Motorsports with SS-Green Light Racing	Chevrolet
Official entry list

== Practice ==
=== First practice ===
The first practice session was held on Friday, July 14, at 1:00 PM EST. The session would last for 55 minutes. Kyle Busch of Joe Gibbs Racing would set the fastest time in the session, with a lap of 29.602 and an average speed of 128.667 mph (207.069 km/h).

Pos	#	Driver	Team	Make	Time	Speed
1	18	Kyle Busch (i)	Joe Gibbs Racing	Toyota	29.602	128.667
2	19	Matt Tifft (R)	Joe Gibbs Racing	Toyota	29.654	128.441
3	23	Spencer Gallagher (R)	GMS Racing	Chevrolet	29.673	128.359
Full first practice results

=== Final practice ===
The final practice session was held on Friday, July 14, at 3:00 PM EST. The session would last for 20 minutes due to inclement weather. Kyle Busch of Joe Gibbs Racing would set the fastest time in the session, with a lap of 29.628 and an average speed of 128.554 mph (206.888 km/h).

Pos	#	Driver	Team	Make	Time	Speed
1	18	Kyle Busch (i)	Joe Gibbs Racing	Toyota	29.628	128.554
2	22	Brad Keselowski (i)	Team Penske	Ford	29.659	128.420
3	20	Ryan Preece	Joe Gibbs Racing	Toyota	29.737	128.083
Full final practice results

== Qualifying ==
Qualifying was held on Saturday, July 15, at 11:05 AM EST. Since New Hampshire Motor Speedway is under 2 miles (3.2 km) in length, the qualifying system was a multi-car system that included three rounds. The first round was 15 minutes, where every driver would be able to set a lap within the 15 minutes. Then, the second round would consist of the fastest 24 cars in Round 1, and drivers would have 10 minutes to set a lap. Round 3 consisted of the fastest 12 drivers from Round 2, and the drivers would have 5 minutes to set a time. Whoever was fastest in Round 3 would win the pole.

Kyle Busch of Joe Gibbs Racing would win the pole after advancing from both preliminary rounds and setting the fastest lap in Round 3, with a time of 29.445 and an average speed of 129.353 mph (208.173 km/h).

No drivers would fail to qualify.

=== Full qualifying results ===
Pos	#	Driver	Team	Make	Time (R1)	Speed (R1)	Time (R2)	Speed (R2)	Time (R3)	Speed (R3)
1	18	Kyle Busch (i)	Joe Gibbs Racing	Toyota	29.853	127.585	29.753	128.014	29.445	129.353
2	22	Brad Keselowski (i)	Team Penske	Ford	29.944	127.197	29.656	128.433	29.510	129.068
3	42	Kyle Larson (i)	Chip Ganassi Racing	Chevrolet	29.836	127.658	29.608	128.641	29.568	128.815
4	19	Matt Tifft (R)	Joe Gibbs Racing	Toyota	29.776	127.915	29.756	128.001	29.568	128.815
5	21	Daniel Hemric (R)	Richard Childress Racing	Chevrolet	29.803	127.799	29.668	128.381	29.634	128.528
6	20	Ryan Preece	Joe Gibbs Racing	Toyota	29.882	127.461	29.688	128.294	29.658	128.424
7	9	William Byron (R)	JR Motorsports	Chevrolet	29.861	127.551	29.785	127.876	29.716	128.173
8	1	Elliott Sadler	JR Motorsports	Chevrolet	29.668	128.381	29.696	128.260	29.750	128.027
9	48	Brennan Poole	Chip Ganassi Racing	Chevrolet	29.994	126.985	29.712	128.191	29.760	127.984
10	00	Cole Custer (R)	Stewart–Haas Racing	Ford	29.734	128.096	29.754	128.010	29.793	127.842
11	7	Justin Allgaier	JR Motorsports	Chevrolet	30.001	126.956	29.816	127.743	29.857	127.568
12	3	Ty Dillon (i)	Richard Childress Racing	Chevrolet	29.968	127.096	29.826	127.701	29.918	127.308
Eliminated in Round 2
13	2	Ben Kennedy (R)	Richard Childress Racing	Chevrolet	29.993	126.990	29.855	127.577	-	-
14	11	Blake Koch	Kaulig Racing	Chevrolet	29.877	127.483	29.923	127.287	-	-
15	28	Dakoda Armstrong	JGL Racing	Toyota	29.934	127.240	29.995	126.981	-	-
16	62	Brendan Gaughan	Richard Childress Racing	Chevrolet	30.160	126.286	30.070	126.664	-	-
17	23	Spencer Gallagher (R)	GMS Racing	Chevrolet	29.987	127.015	30.115	126.475	-	-
18	4	Ross Chastain	JD Motorsports	Chevrolet	30.194	126.144	30.172	126.236	-	-
19	16	Ryan Reed	Roush Fenway Racing	Ford	30.391	125.327	30.179	126.207	-	-
20	39	Ryan Sieg	RSS Racing	Chevrolet	30.344	125.521	30.212	126.069	-	-
21	14	J. J. Yeley	TriStar Motorsports	Toyota	30.289	125.749	30.255	125.890	-	-
22	33	Brandon Jones	Richard Childress Racing	Chevrolet	30.267	125.840	30.287	125.757	-	-
23	5	Michael Annett	JR Motorsports	Chevrolet	30.439	125.129	30.375	125.393	-	-
24	01	Harrison Rhodes	JD Motorsports	Chevrolet	30.379	125.376	30.564	124.617	-	-
Eliminated in Round 1
25	0	Garrett Smithley	JD Motorsports	Chevrolet	30.513	124.825	-	-	-	-
26	51	Jeremy Clements	Jeremy Clements Racing	Chevrolet	30.515	124.817	-	-	-	-
27	8	B. J. McLeod	B. J. McLeod Motorsports	Chevrolet	30.595	124.491	-	-	-	-
28	99	David Starr	BJMM with SS-Green Light Racing	Chevrolet	30.633	124.336	-	-	-	-
29	15	Reed Sorenson (i)	JD Motorsports	Chevrolet	30.791	123.698	-	-	-	-
30	93	Jeff Green	RSS Racing	Chevrolet	30.841	123.498	-	-	-	-
31	78	Tommy Joe Martins	B. J. McLeod Motorsports	Chevrolet	30.856	123.438	-	-	-	-
32	07	Spencer Boyd	SS-Green Light Racing	Chevrolet	31.094	122.493	-	-	-	-
33	40	Timmy Hill	MBM Motorsports	Dodge	31.126	122.367	-	-	-	-
Qualified by owner's points
34	52	Joey Gase	Jimmy Means Racing	Chevrolet	31.418	121.230	-	-	-	-
35	89	Morgan Shepherd	Shepherd Racing Ventures	Chevrolet	31.797	119.785	-	-	-	-
36	13	Carl Long	MBM Motorsports	Chevrolet	31.870	119.511	-	-	-	-
37	90	Martin Roy	King Autosport	Chevrolet	31.973	119.126	-	-	-	-
38	74	Mike Harmon	Mike Harmon Racing	Dodge	32.857	115.921	-	-	-	-
39	24	Dylan Lupton	JGL Racing	Toyota	-	-	-	-	-	-
Qualified by time
40	72	John Jackson	MBM Motorsports	Dodge	33.788	112.726	-	-	-	-
Official qualifying results
Official starting lineup

== Race results ==
Stage 1 Laps: 45

Pos	#	Driver	Team	Make	Pts
1	42	Kyle Larson (i)	Chip Ganassi Racing	Chevrolet	0
2	20	Ryan Preece	Joe Gibbs Racing	Toyota	9
3	18	Kyle Busch (i)	Joe Gibbs Racing	Toyota	0
4	1	Elliott Sadler	JR Motorsports	Chevrolet	7
5	22	Brad Keselowski (i)	Team Penske	Ford	0
6	7	Justin Allgaier	JR Motorsports	Chevrolet	5
7	48	Brennan Poole	Chip Ganassi Racing	Chevrolet	4
8	3	Ty Dillon (i)	Richard Childress Racing	Chevrolet	0
9	9	William Byron (R)	JR Motorsports	Chevrolet	2
10	19	Matt Tifft (R)	Joe Gibbs Racing	Toyota	1

Stage 2 Laps: 45

Pos	#	Driver	Team	Make	Pts
1	22	Brad Keselowski (i)	Team Penske	Ford	0
2	18	Kyle Busch (i)	Joe Gibbs Racing	Toyota	0
3	42	Kyle Larson (i)	Chip Ganassi Racing	Chevrolet	0
4	20	Ryan Preece	Joe Gibbs Racing	Toyota	7
5	9	William Byron (R)	JR Motorsports	Chevrolet	6
6	1	Elliott Sadler	JR Motorsports	Chevrolet	5
7	3	Ty Dillon (i)	Richard Childress Racing	Chevrolet	0
8	19	Matt Tifft (R)	Joe Gibbs Racing	Toyota	3
9	48	Brennan Poole	Chip Ganassi Racing	Chevrolet	2
10	2	Ben Kennedy (R)	Richard Childress Racing	Chevrolet	1

Stage 3 Laps: 110

Pos	#	Driver	Team	Make	Laps	Led	Status	Pts
1	18	Kyle Busch (i)	Joe Gibbs Racing	Toyota	200	77	running	0
2	20	Ryan Preece	Joe Gibbs Racing	Toyota	200	2	running	51
3	9	William Byron (R)	JR Motorsports	Chevrolet	200	0	running	42
4	42	Kyle Larson (i)	Chip Ganassi Racing	Chevrolet	200	11	running	0
5	22	Brad Keselowski (i)	Team Penske	Ford	200	102	running	0
6	2	Ben Kennedy (R)	Richard Childress Racing	Chevrolet	200	0	running	32
7	1	Elliott Sadler	JR Motorsports	Chevrolet	199	5	running	42
8	3	Ty Dillon (i)	Richard Childress Racing	Chevrolet	199	0	running	0
9	00	Cole Custer (R)	Stewart–Haas Racing	Ford	199	0	running	28
10	48	Brennan Poole	Chip Ganassi Racing	Chevrolet	199	0	running	33
11	19	Matt Tifft (R)	Joe Gibbs Racing	Toyota	199	1	running	30
12	21	Daniel Hemric (R)	Richard Childress Racing	Chevrolet	199	0	running	25
13	11	Blake Koch	Kaulig Racing	Chevrolet	199	0	running	24
14	16	Ryan Reed	Roush Fenway Racing	Ford	198	0	running	23
15	14	J. J. Yeley	TriStar Motorsports	Toyota	198	0	running	22
16	5	Michael Annett	JR Motorsports	Chevrolet	198	0	running	21
17	62	Brendan Gaughan	Richard Childress Racing	Chevrolet	197	0	running	20
18	01	Harrison Rhodes	JD Motorsports	Chevrolet	197	0	running	19
19	4	Ross Chastain	JD Motorsports	Chevrolet	197	0	running	18
20	39	Ryan Sieg	RSS Racing	Chevrolet	197	0	running	17
21	51	Jeremy Clements	Jeremy Clements Racing	Chevrolet	197	0	running	16
22	24	Dylan Lupton	JGL Racing	Toyota	196	0	running	15
23	0	Garrett Smithley	JD Motorsports	Chevrolet	195	0	running	14
24	28	Dakoda Armstrong	JGL Racing	Toyota	195	0	running	13
25	52	Joey Gase	Jimmy Means Racing	Chevrolet	195	0	running	12
26	8	B. J. McLeod	B. J. McLeod Motorsports	Chevrolet	194	0	running	11
27	07	Spencer Boyd	SS-Green Light Racing	Chevrolet	193	0	running	10
28	40	Timmy Hill	MBM Motorsports	Dodge	186	0	running	9
29	78	Tommy Joe Martins	B. J. McLeod Motorsports	Chevrolet	185	0	running	8
30	99	David Starr	BJMM with SS-Green Light Racing	Chevrolet	184	0	running	7
31	74	Mike Harmon	Mike Harmon Racing	Dodge	178	0	running	6
32	7	Justin Allgaier	JR Motorsports	Chevrolet	173	2	running	10
33	90	Martin Roy	King Autosport	Chevrolet	163	0	engine	4
34	33	Brandon Jones	Richard Childress Racing	Chevrolet	157	0	running	3
35	23	Spencer Gallagher (R)	GMS Racing	Chevrolet	156	0	suspension	2
36	13	Carl Long	MBM Motorsports	Chevrolet	67	0	electrical	1
37	89	Morgan Shepherd	Shepherd Racing Ventures	Chevrolet	59	0	suspension	1
38	93	Jeff Green	RSS Racing	Chevrolet	15	0	electrical	1
39	15	Reed Sorenson (i)	JD Motorsports	Chevrolet	7	0	brakes	0
40	72	John Jackson	MBM Motorsports	Dodge	4	0	vibration	1
Official race results

== Standings after the race ==
Drivers' Championship standings

Pos	Driver	Points
1	Elliott Sadler	620
2	William Byron	575 (–45)
3	Justin Allgaier	530 (–90)
4	Brennan Poole	428 (–192)
5	Daniel Hemric	421 (–199)
6	Cole Custer	396 (–224)
7	Matt Tifft	387 (–233)
8	Ryan Reed	377 (–243)
9	Michael Annett	355 (–265)
10	Dakoda Armstrong	351 (–269)
11	Blake Koch	324 (–296)
12	Bubba Wallace	321 (–337)
Official driver's standings

- Note: Only the first 12 positions are included for the driver standings.

Previous race: 2017 Alsco 300	NASCAR Xfinity Series; 2017 season	Next race: 2017 Lilly Diabetes 250
