= 2017 Alsco 300 =

16th race of the 2017 NASCAR Xfinity Series

Race details
- Race 16 of 33 in the 2017 NASCAR Xfinity Series
- Date: July 7, 2017
- Official name: 17th Annual Alsco 300
- Location: Sparta, Kentucky, Kentucky Speedway
- Course: Permanent racing facility
- Course length: 1.5 miles (2.4 km)
- Distance: 200 laps, 300 mi (480 km)
- Scheduled distance: 200 laps, 300 mi (480 km)
- Average speed: 119.258 miles per hour (191.927 km/h)

Pole position
Driver	Kyle Busch	Joe Gibbs Racing
- Time: 29.681

Most laps led
Driver	Erik Jones	Joe Gibbs Racing
- Laps: 77

Winner
No. 18	Kyle Busch	Joe Gibbs Racing

Television in the United States
- Network: NBCSN
- Announcers: Rick Allen, Jeff Burton, Steve Letarte

Radio in the United States
- Radio: Performance Racing Network

The 2017 Alsco 300 was the 16th stock car race of the 2017 NASCAR Xfinity Series season and the 17th iteration of the event. The race was held on Friday, July 7, 2017, Sparta, Kentucky, at Kentucky Speedway, a 1.5 miles (2.4 km) permanent tri-oval racetrack. Due to inclement weather, the remainder of the race was held on Saturday, July 8. The race took the scheduled 200 laps to complete. At race's end, Kyle Busch, driving for Joe Gibbs Racing, scored his 88th career win in the xfinity series. He would hold off Ryan Blaney and Erik Jones for the win.

== Entry list ==
- (R) denotes rookie driver.
- (i) denotes driver who is ineligible for series driver points.

#	Driver	Team	Make
00	Cole Custer (R)	Stewart–Haas Racing	Ford
0	Garrett Smithley	JD Motorsports	Chevrolet
01	Harrison Rhodes	JD Motorsports	Chevrolet
1	Elliott Sadler	JR Motorsports	Chevrolet
2	Paul Menard (i)	Richard Childress Racing	Chevrolet
3	Ty Dillon (i)	Richard Childress Racing	Chevrolet
4	Ross Chastain	JD Motorsports	Chevrolet
5	Michael Annett	JR Motorsports	Chevrolet
07	Ray Black Jr.	SS-Green Light Racing	Chevrolet
7	Justin Allgaier	JR Motorsports	Chevrolet
8	B. J. McLeod	B. J. McLeod Motorsports	Chevrolet
9	William Byron (R)	JR Motorsports	Chevrolet
11	Blake Koch	Kaulig Racing	Chevrolet
12	Ryan Blaney (i)	Team Penske	Ford
13	Timmy Hill	MBM Motorsports	Toyota
14	J. J. Yeley	TriStar Motorsports	Toyota
16	Ryan Reed	Roush Fenway Racing	Ford
18	Kyle Busch (i)	Joe Gibbs Racing	Toyota
19	Matt Tifft (R)	Joe Gibbs Racing	Toyota
20	Erik Jones (i)	Joe Gibbs Racing	Toyota
21	Daniel Hemric (R)	Richard Childress Racing	Chevrolet
22	Joey Logano (i)	Team Penske	Ford
23	Spencer Gallagher (R)	GMS Racing	Chevrolet
24	Jeb Burton	JGL Racing	Toyota
28	Dakoda Armstrong	JGL Racing	Toyota
33	Brandon Jones	Richard Childress Racing	Chevrolet
39	Ryan Sieg	RSS Racing	Chevrolet
40	Chad Finchum	MBM Motorsports	Chevrolet
41	Kevin Harvick (i)	Stewart–Haas Racing	Ford
42	Tyler Reddick	Chip Ganassi Racing	Chevrolet
46	Quin Houff	Precision Performance Motorsports	Chevrolet
48	Brennan Poole	Chip Ganassi Racing	Chevrolet
51	Jeremy Clements	Jeremy Clements Racing	Chevrolet
52	Joey Gase	Jimmy Means Racing	Chevrolet
62	Brendan Gaughan	Richard Childress Racing	Chevrolet
74	Mike Harmon	Mike Harmon Racing	Dodge
78	Angela Ruch	B. J. McLeod Motorsports	Chevrolet
89	Morgan Shepherd	Shepherd Racing Ventures	Chevrolet
90	Brandon Brown	Brandonbilt Motorsports	Chevrolet
93	Jeff Green	RSS Racing	Chevrolet
96	Ben Kennedy (R)	GMS Racing	Chevrolet
98	Casey Mears	Biagi–DenBeste Racing	Ford
99	David Starr	B. J. McLeod Motorsports with SS-Green Light Racing	Chevrolet
Official entry list

== Practice ==
Practice was held on Thursday, July 6, at 2:00 PM EST. The session would last for 55 minutes. Kyle Busch of Joe Gibbs Racing would set the fastest time in the session, with a lap of 29.607 and an average speed of 182.389 mph (293.527 km/h).

Pos	#	Driver	Team	Make	Time	Speed
1	18	Kyle Busch (i)	Joe Gibbs Racing	Toyota	29.607	182.389
2	12	Ryan Blaney (i)	Team Penske	Ford	29.744	181.549
3	33	Brandon Jones	Richard Childress Racing	Chevrolet	29.794	181.245
Full practice results

== Qualifying ==
Second and final practice was cancelled due to inclement weather. Qualifying was held on Friday, July 7, at 4:30 PM EST. Since Kentucky Speedway is under 2 miles (3.2 km) in length, the qualifying system was a multi-car system that included three rounds. The first round was 15 minutes, where every driver would be able to set a lap within the 15 minutes. Then, the second round would consist of the fastest 24 cars in Round 1, and drivers would have 10 minutes to set a lap. Round 3 consisted of the fastest 12 drivers from Round 2, and the drivers would have 5 minutes to set a time. Whoever was fastest in Round 3 would win the pole.

Kyle Busch of Joe Gibbs Racing would win the pole after advancing from both preliminary rounds and setting the fastest lap in Round 3, with a time of 29.681 and an average speed of 181.935 mph (292.796 km/h).

Morgan Shepherd, Quin Houff, and Brandon Brown would fail to qualify.

=== Full qualifying results ===
Pos	#	Driver	Team	Make	Time (R1)	Speed (R1)	Time (R2)	Speed (R2)	Time (R3)	Speed (R3)
1	18	Kyle Busch (i)	Joe Gibbs Racing	Toyota	30.586	176.551	29.910	180.542	29.681	181.935
2	20	Erik Jones (i)	Joe Gibbs Racing	Toyota	29.907	180.560	29.753	181.494	29.730	181.635
3	12	Ryan Blaney (i)	Team Penske	Ford	30.385	177.719	29.826	181.050	29.776	181.354
4	22	Joey Logano (i)	Team Penske	Ford	30.289	178.283	30.049	179.706	29.913	180.524
5	9	William Byron (R)	JR Motorsports	Chevrolet	30.275	178.365	29.976	180.144	29.975	180.150
6	42	Tyler Reddick	Chip Ganassi Racing	Chevrolet	30.596	176.596	30.012	179.928	30.039	179.766
7	48	Brennan Poole	Chip Ganassi Racing	Chevrolet	30.113	179.325	30.077	179.539	30.049	179.706
8	00	Cole Custer (R)	Stewart–Haas Racing	Ford	30.257	178.471	30.041	179.754	30.056	179.665
9	2	Paul Menard (i)	Richard Childress Racing	Chevrolet	30.242	178.560	30.129	179.229	30.131	179.217
10	21	Daniel Hemric (R)	Richard Childress Racing	Chevrolet	30.244	178.548	29.902	180.590	30.156	179.069
11	41	Kevin Harvick (i)	Stewart–Haas Racing	Ford	30.467	177.241	29.931	180.415	30.244	178.548
12	3	Ty Dillon (i)	Richard Childress Racing	Chevrolet	30.595	176.499	30.131	179.217	30.356	177.889
Eliminated in Round 2
13	7	Justin Allgaier	JR Motorsports	Chevrolet	30.434	177.433	30.152	179.093	-	-
14	23	Spencer Gallagher (R)	GMS Racing	Chevrolet	30.203	178.790	30.177	178.944	-	-
15	19	Matt Tifft (R)	Joe Gibbs Racing	Toyota	30.210	178.749	30.220	178.690	-	-
16	96	Ben Kennedy (R)	GMS Racing	Chevrolet	30.696	175.919	30.240	178.571	-	-
17	62	Brendan Gaughan	Richard Childress Racing	Chevrolet	30.675	176.039	30.241	178.566	-	-
18	1	Elliott Sadler	JR Motorsports	Chevrolet	30.228	178.642	30.287	178.294	-	-
19	11	Blake Koch	Kaulig Racing	Chevrolet	30.602	176.459	30.301	178.212	-	-
20	33	Brandon Jones	Richard Childress Racing	Toyota	30.361	177.860	30.309	178.165	-	-
21	16	Ryan Reed	Roush Fenway Racing	Ford	30.400	177.632	30.389	177.696	-	-
22	28	Dakoda Armstrong	JGL Racing	Toyota	30.667	176.085	30.591	176.523	-	-
23	5	Michael Annett	JR Motorsports	Chevrolet	30.545	176.788	30.779	175.444	-	-
24	4	Ross Chastain	JD Motorsports	Chevrolet	30.697	175.913	-	-	-	-
Eliminated in Round 1
25	98	Casey Mears	Biagi–DenBeste Racing	Ford	30.727	175.741	-	-	-	-
26	51	Jeremy Clements	Jeremy Clements Racing	Chevrolet	30.801	175.319	-	-	-	-
27	39	Ryan Sieg	RSS Racing	Chevrolet	30.831	175.148	-	-	-	-
28	93	Jeff Green	RSS Racing	Chevrolet	30.905	174.729	-	-	-	-
29	24	Jeb Burton	JGL Racing	Toyota	30.972	174.351	-	-	-	-
30	14	J. J. Yeley	TriStar Motorsports	Toyota	31.020	174.081	-	-	-	-
31	8	B. J. McLeod	B. J. McLeod Motorsports	Chevrolet	31.070	173.801	-	-	-	-
32	0	Garrett Smithley	JD Motorsports	Chevrolet	31.242	172.844	-	-	-	-
33	01	Harrison Rhodes	JD Motorsports	Chevrolet	31.309	172.474	-	-	-	-
Qualified by owner's points
34	07	Ray Black Jr.	SS-Green Light Racing	Chevrolet	31.512	171.363	-	-	-	-
35	52	Joey Gase	Jimmy Means Racing	Chevrolet	31.620	170.778	-	-	-	-
36	99	David Starr	BJMM with SS-Green Light Racing	Chevrolet	31.651	170.611	-	-	-	-
37	13	Timmy Hill	MBM Motorsports	Toyota	31.667	170.525	-	-	-	-
38	40	Chad Finchum	MBM Motorsports	Chevrolet	32.270	167.338	-	-	-	-
39	74	Mike Harmon	Mike Harmon Racing	Dodge	33.035	163.463	-	-	-	-
40	78	Angela Ruch	B. J. McLeod Motorsports	Chevrolet	33.882	159.377	-	-	-	-
Failed to qualify
41	89	Morgan Shepherd	Shepherd Racing Ventures	Chevrolet	31.588	170.951	-	-	-	-
42	46	Quin Houff	Precision Performance Motorsports	Chevrolet	2:01.800	13.437	-	-	-	-
43	90	Brandon Brown	Brandonbilt Motorsports	Chevrolet	-	-	-	-	-	-
Official qualifying results
Official starting lineup

== Race results ==
Stage 1 Laps: 45

Pos	#	Driver	Team	Make	Pts
1	20	Erik Jones (i)	Joe Gibbs Racing	Toyota	0
2	18	Kyle Busch (i)	Joe Gibbs Racing	Toyota	0
3	22	Joey Logano (i)	Team Penske	Ford	0
4	2	Paul Menard (i)	Richard Childress Racing	Chevrolet	0
5	42	Tyler Reddick	Chip Ganassi Racing	Chevrolet	6
6	00	Cole Custer (R)	Stewart–Haas Racing	Ford	5
7	9	William Byron (R)	JR Motorsports	Chevrolet	4
8	7	Justin Allgaier	JR Motorsports	Chevrolet	3
9	12	Ryan Blaney (i)	Team Penske	Ford	0
10	41	Kevin Harvick (i)	Stewart–Haas Racing	Ford	0

Stage 2 Laps: 45

Pos	#	Driver	Team	Make	Pts
1	12	Ryan Blaney (i)	Team Penske	Ford	0
2	20	Erik Jones (i)	Joe Gibbs Racing	Toyota	0
3	18	Kyle Busch (i)	Joe Gibbs Racing	Toyota	0
4	41	Kevin Harvick (i)	Stewart–Haas Racing	Ford	0
5	2	Paul Menard (i)	Richard Childress Racing	Chevrolet	0
6	9	William Byron (R)	JR Motorsports	Chevrolet	5
7	7	Justin Allgaier	JR Motorsports	Chevrolet	4
8	22	Joey Logano (i)	Team Penske	Ford	0
9	42	Tyler Reddick	Chip Ganassi Racing	Chevrolet	2
10	48	Brennan Poole	Chip Ganassi Racing	Chevrolet	1

Stage 3 Laps: 110

Pos	#	Driver	Team	Make	Laps	Led	Status	Pts
1	18	Kyle Busch (i)	Joe Gibbs Racing	Toyota	200	70	Running	0
2	12	Ryan Blaney (i)	Team Penske	Ford	200	52	Running	0
3	20	Erik Jones (i)	Joe Gibbs Racing	Toyota	200	77	Running	0
4	41	Kevin Harvick (i)	Stewart–Haas Racing	Ford	200	0	Running	0
5	3	Ty Dillon (i)	Richard Childress Racing	Chevrolet	200	0	Running	0
6	22	Joey Logano (i)	Team Penske	Ford	200	1	Running	0
7	9	William Byron (R)	JR Motorsports	Chevrolet	200	0	Running	39
8	7	Justin Allgaier	JR Motorsports	Chevrolet	200	0	Running	36
9	21	Daniel Hemric (R)	Richard Childress Racing	Chevrolet	200	0	Running	28
10	42	Tyler Reddick	Chip Ganassi Racing	Chevrolet	200	0	Running	35
11	00	Cole Custer (R)	Stewart–Haas Racing	Ford	200	0	Running	31
12	1	Elliott Sadler	JR Motorsports	Chevrolet	200	0	Running	25
13	23	Spencer Gallagher (R)	GMS Racing	Chevrolet	200	0	Running	24
14	19	Matt Tifft (R)	Joe Gibbs Racing	Toyota	200	0	Running	23
15	98	Casey Mears	Biagi–DenBeste Racing	Ford	200	0	Running	22
16	5	Michael Annett	JR Motorsports	Chevrolet	200	0	Running	21
17	28	Dakoda Armstrong	JGL Racing	Toyota	200	0	Running	20
18	39	Ryan Sieg	RSS Racing	Chevrolet	200	0	Running	19
19	24	Jeb Burton	JGL Racing	Toyota	200	0	Running	18
20	4	Ross Chastain	JD Motorsports	Chevrolet	200	0	Running	17
21	48	Brennan Poole	Chip Ganassi Racing	Chevrolet	199	0	Running	17
22	51	Jeremy Clements	Jeremy Clements Racing	Chevrolet	199	0	Running	15
23	11	Blake Koch	Kaulig Racing	Chevrolet	199	0	Running	14
24	8	B. J. McLeod	B. J. McLeod Motorsports	Chevrolet	198	0	Running	13
25	14	J. J. Yeley	TriStar Motorsports	Toyota	197	0	Running	12
26	0	Garrett Smithley	JD Motorsports	Chevrolet	196	0	Running	11
27	07	Ray Black Jr.	SS-Green Light Racing	Chevrolet	195	0	Running	10
28	01	Harrison Rhodes	JD Motorsports	Chevrolet	195	0	Running	9
29	40	Chad Finchum	MBM Motorsports	Chevrolet	194	0	Running	8
30	78	Angela Ruch	B. J. McLeod Motorsports	Chevrolet	192	0	Running	7
31	99	David Starr	BJMM with SS-Green Light Racing	Chevrolet	188	0	Running	6
32	96	Ben Kennedy (R)	GMS Racing	Chevrolet	178	0	Electrical	5
33	52	Joey Gase	Jimmy Means Racing	Chevrolet	125	0	Transmission	4
34	2	Paul Menard (i)	Richard Childress Racing	Chevrolet	102	0	Accident	0
35	74	Mike Harmon	Mike Harmon Racing	Chevrolet	58	0	Engine	2
36	16	Ryan Reed	Roush Fenway Racing	Ford	55	0	Overheating	1
37	93	Jeff Green	RSS Racing	Chevrolet	53	0	Ignition	1
38	13	Timmy Hill	MBM Motorsports	Toyota	31	0	Suspension	1
39	62	Brendan Gaughan	Richard Childress Racing	Chevrolet	6	0	Accident	1
40	33	Brandon Jones	Richard Childress Racing	Chevrolet	0	0	Accident	1
Official race results

== Standings after the race ==
Drivers' Championship standings

Pos	Driver	Points
1	Elliott Sadler	578
2	William Byron	533 (–45)
3	Justin Allgaier	520 (–58)
4	Daniel Hemric	396 (–182)
5	Brennan Poole	395 (–183)
6	Cole Custer	368 (–210)
7	Matt Tifft	357 (–221)
8	Ryan Reed	354 (–224)
9	Dakoda Armstrong	338 (–240)
10	Michael Annett	334 (–244)
11	Bubba Wallace	321 (–257)
12	Blake Koch	300 (–278)
Official driver's standings

- Note: Only the first 12 positions are included for the driver standings.

Previous race: 2017 Coca-Cola Firecracker 250	NASCAR Xfinity Series; 2017 season	Next race: 2017 Overton's 200
