= Tradegood =

Global sourcing platform

- Formerly: iSupplier Intelligence (ISI)
- Type: Private
- Industry: Internet, Sourcing, Apparel, Textile
- Founded: 2012
- Headquarters: New York
- Parent: Intertek

Tradegood, formerly known as iSupplier Intelligence (ISI), is a global sourcing platform that connects buyers and suppliers across more than 100 countries. It specializes in matching business counterparts in sourcing and aims to bridge the gap between buyers and suppliers.

Tradegood provides supplier evaluation services using more than 50 different criteria, including operational history, regulatory compliance, the number of employees, environmental sustainability as well as security measurement. Tradegood is working with worldwide buyer and supplier groups, including Worldwide Responsible Accredited Production (WRAP), Fibre2Fashion, and Trendstop, to provide one-stop sourcing solution to its members.

Headquartered in New York City, USA, Tradegood also has offices across Hong Kong, Shanghai, Hangzhou, Qingdao and Shenzhen in China.

== History ==
The new brand Tradegood was officially launched in August 2012 in the SOURCING at MAGIC at Las Vegas, USA, the largest apparel and textile expo in North America. It was then brought to the China market with a series of large scale launch events spanning across 6 major cities with the participation of some 1,000 buyers, suppliers, industry associations and media.

2012
June	Bangkok, Thailand
May	Manila, Philippines; Bandung, Indonesia; Jakarta, Indonesia; Melbourne, Australia; Sydney, Australia
January	London, UK; Paris, France; Milan, Italy; Frankfurt, Germany; Stockholm, Sweden
2011
December	Istanbul, Turkey; Taipei, Taiwan
November	Ho Chi Minh City, Vietnam; Hanoi, Vietnam
October	Bangalore, India; Delhi, India; Dhaka, Bangladesh
March	Hong Kong, China; Shanghai, China
