= Best Employers in Canada =

== Background ==
Best Employers in Canada is an annual study that ranks organizations found to have created positive work environments. It is open to any employer that has done business in Canada for at least three years and has at least 50 Canadian-based employees.

A key aspect of the study is to identify and rank Canadian companies based the "engagement" level of employees. Engagement is a term used to define how good employees feel about their employer generally, how likely they are to stay with the company voluntarily, and how motivated they are by their leaders, managers, company culture and values to contribute to the company's success.

The Best Employers study analyses data gathered from employees, company leaders, and HR leaders. The study's signature feature is that it conducts extensive employee polling to determine how the employees themselves feel about the companies for whom they work.

This annual award is organized by the human resources consulting firm, AON Hewitt. It's not known how many of the organizations on the annual list are clients of the firm.

== Methodology ==
Participating organizations agree to a three part measurement exercise:

1. Employee Opinion Survey
2. Leadership Team Survey
3. Human Resources Practices Questionnaire

A cross-section of employees is tapped for the Employee Opinion Survey, which is typically conducted in census format, i.e., all employees are invited to respond. Leaders complete a separate survey on an individual basis and the Human Resources team completes the practice questionnaire as a group.

== Results ==
Data is analyzed based on academically endorsed methods and findings are released annually in October. Results are published in English in MacLean's magazine under the name "Best Employers in Canada". Results are published in French in La Presse newspaper under the name "Employeurs de choix au Canada".

== Related studies ==
=== Best Small & Medium Employers (BSME) in Canada ===
The overall Best Employers in Canada Study generates several sub-lists including Best Employers in Quebec, Best Employers in the GTA, and the Green 30. It is conducted annually and is sponsored by Aon Hewitt, and the National Quality Institute. It is open to organizations that have operated in Canada for at least three years, and have between 50 and 399 permanent Canadian-based employees. Survey methodology is similar to that of the Best Employers in Canada study. Results are published annually in Profit magazine.
