= G&K Services =

American workwear company

G&K Services, Inc.
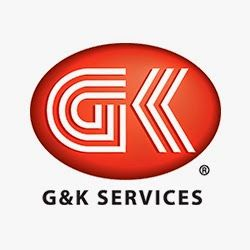
- Company type: Subsidiary
- Traded as: Nasdaq: GK
- Industry: Service
- Founded: 1902; 124 years ago
- Headquarters: Minnetonka, Minnesota, U.S.
- Key people: Douglas A. Milroy (CEO)
- Products: work uniforms, facility services, fire resistant clothing, work shirts, work shorts, high visibility clothing, scrubs, healthcare clothing, manufacturing uniforms
- Number of employees: 7,800 (2013)
- Parent: Cintas (2017–present)
- Website: www.gkservices.com

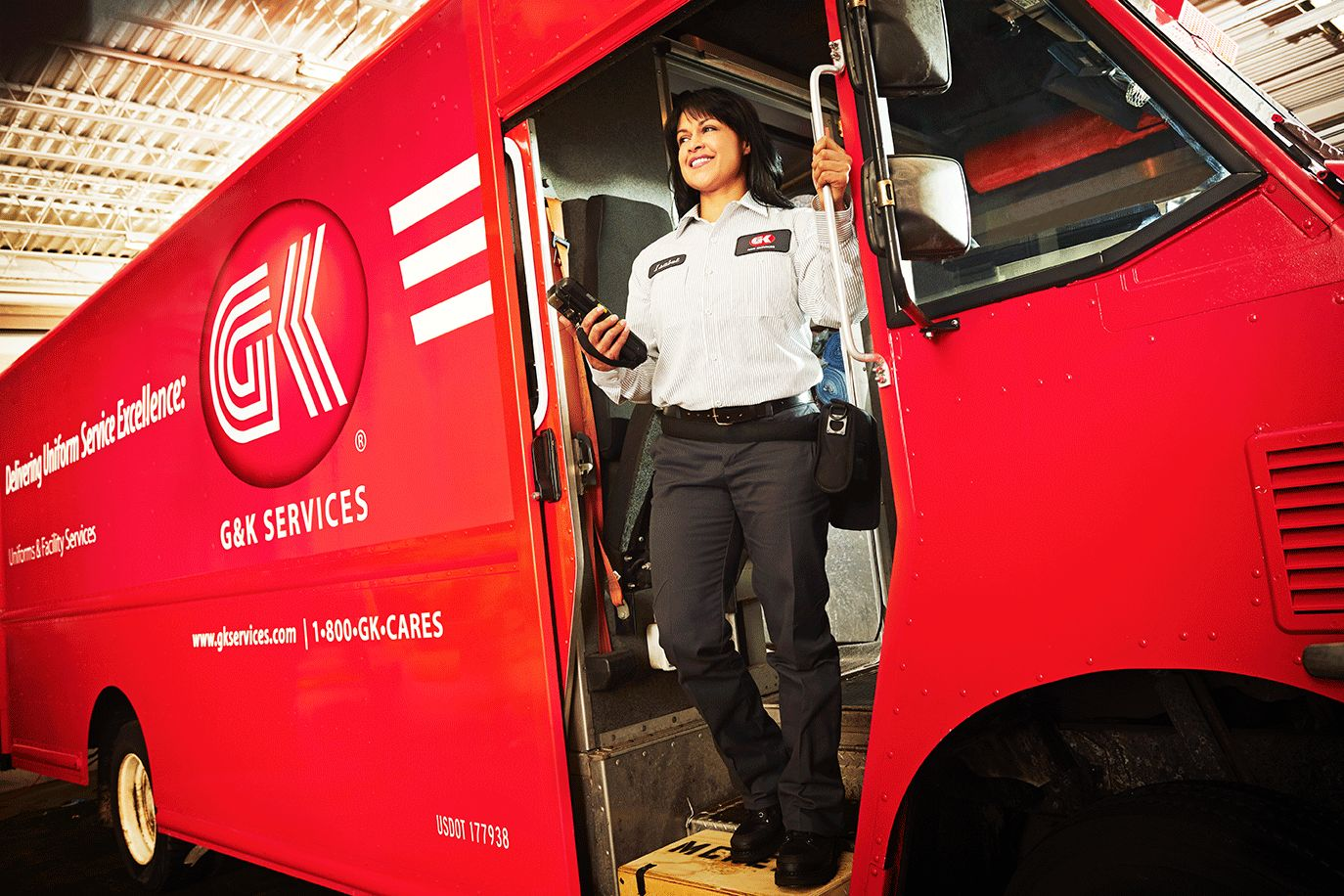
G&K Services delivery truck & driver

G&K Services, Inc. was an American company based in Minnetonka, Minnesota, which provided branded identity uniforms and facility products and services for rent and purchase. G&K Services' branded clothing and facility services programs provided rental-lease or purchase options through its direct sale programs (GKDirect). On March 21, 2017, the company was acquired by Cintas for approximately $2.2 billion.

G&K Services' primary offerings were custom-embroidered logo clothing programs, facility services such as restroom supplies and floor mats, cleanroom garments, and process control services. It served various industries including automotive, warehousing, distribution, transportation, energy, manufacturing, food processing, healthcare, warehousing, mining, gas, oil, pharmaceutical, semi-conductor, retail, restaurants, security, airline, and hospitality.

The company experienced a 4% growth in revenue in fiscal year 2014 with an annual revenue of $900.9 million. The company received awards for good water practices and G&K Services Canada was named one of the “Best Employers in Canada” for eleven consecutive years. G&K was also active in auto racing sponsorship with JD Motorsports.

== History ==
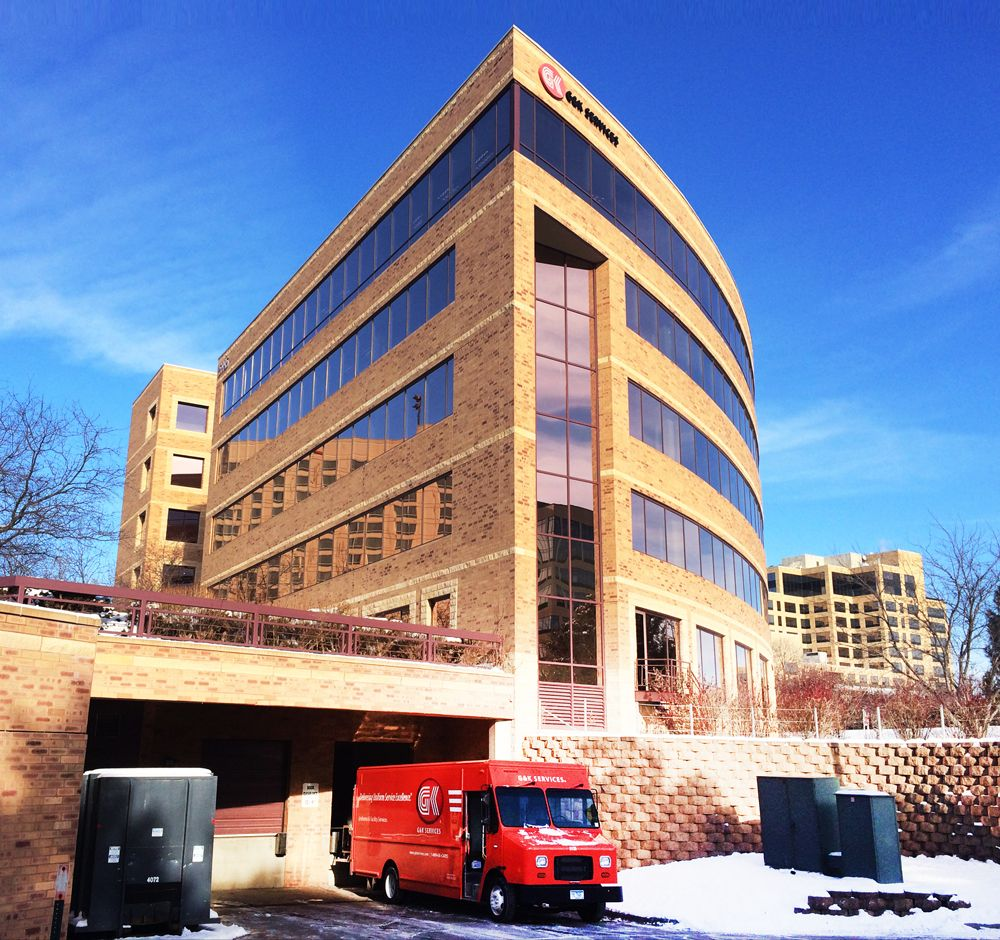
G&K Services Corporate Office in Minnetonka, Minnesota

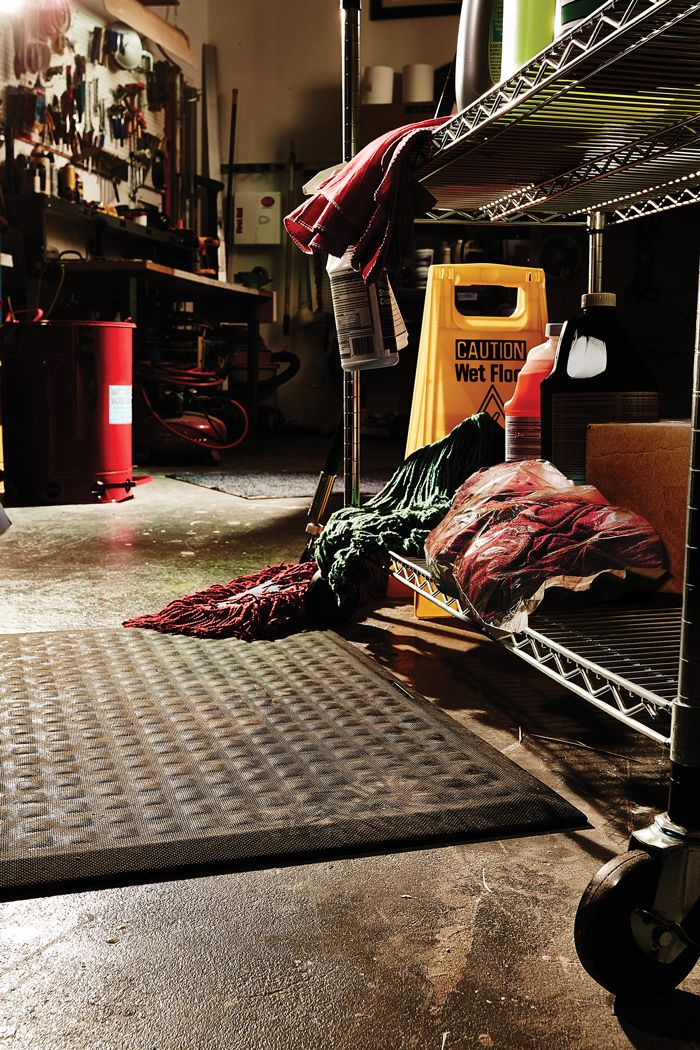
G&K Services Facility Services

G&K began as a family-owned dye house. In 1902, the company, founded as Twin City Steam Dye Works, was renamed to Gross & Kronick Dyers in Minneapolis. They introduced "door-to-door" laundry service in 1910. In 1948, G&K introduced "diaper service" due to the Baby Boom. The company responded to the automobile wave in 1960 by opening "drive-in cleaners". G&K went public in 1969, and they began expanding into the Central and Midwest regions in 1970. G&K became a multinational company when they expanded into Canada in 1990. In 1996, they formed their direct-purchase division. In 2002 G&K celebrated their 100th year of business.

In 2016, G&K Services agreed to be purchased by Cintas Corporation of Mason, Ohio. The acquisition was completed on March 21, 2017.

== Acquisitions ==
In 1991, G&K acquired WorkWear of Canada. In 1994, the company acquired BCP Garment Manufacturing. In 1997, the company acquired National Linen Service. In 1999, G&K acquired Northeast Dust Products out of Massachusetts.

In 2002, G&K acquired Rental Uniform Company. In 2004, G&K acquired Keefer Laundry Limited in Western Canada. In the same year, G&K acquired Nettoyeur Shefford out of Quebec, Marathon Linen, and Lion Uniform Group.

In 2005, G&K acquired Custom Linen Systems, Coyne Textile Services, and Glis and Glis Laundries in Canada.

In 2007, G&K acquired Leef Services out of Minnesota, Alltext Uniform Rental Service, and Nonclean Limited out of Ireland. In 2008, G&K acquired Best Uniform Rental Service.

== Products and services ==
G&K services provided a variety of clothing and uniform products. In addition, G&K Services provided flame resistant garments and personal protective equipment by developing and providing the ProTect flame resistant safety solutions.

== Sustainability ==
G&K Services was a founding member of the Textile Rental Services Association of America's (TRSA) Laundry Environmental Stewardship Program (LaundryESP).

G&K was also a member of the U.S. Green Building Council (USGBC), an organization that advocates for environmentally sustainable practices in buildings and communities.

G&K Services sold and rented many products that are EcoLogo Product Certified, which is a part of the Environmental Choice Program. The company also carried numerous Green Seal Certified paper towels and products.

G&K Services’ water reuse system in their laundry facilities reduced fresh water use by up to 40%. Their heat recovery systems reduced natural gas consumption and lowered greenhouse gas emissions.

G&K cut fleet fuel consumption and greenhouse gases by using a GPS-based telematics system in their vehicles that helps improve fuel efficiency and reduce greenhouse gas emissions. Vehicles ran on cleaner burning diesel, and in California trucks were hybrid electric powered.

== Community ==
In 2005, G&K Services launched the G&K Services Foundation, which supported communities through financial grants, in-kind uniform donations and matching employees’ United Way pledges. Between 2007 and 2013 they gave more than $1.3 million in financial grants to charitable organizations and nonprofits. G&K Services supported the United Way, and in 2014 they contributed more than $320,000. In 2014, the company achieved a 110% increase in their campaign compared to the year before. G&K worked with job training programs such as Twin Cities RISE!, LifeWorks and The Newman Association to help people reach their full potential in their work and careers. Beginning in 2009, GKdirect held a Workforce for a Cure campaign that encouraged G&K Services’ customers to trade in their everyday work wear for pink ribbon apparel in honor of Breast Cancer Awareness Month (TRSA Source). A portion of the purchase price was donated to the American Cancer Society's Making Strides Against Breast Cancer campaign.

== Awards and recognition ==
G&K earned recognition from several local government organizations for compliance with wastewater requirements.

G&K Services' manufacturing facility in the Dominican Republic was recognized with a Worldwide Responsible Accredited Production (WRAP) Gold Certificate of Compliance for its compliance with workplace standards and commitment to workplace safety and environmental conservation.

G&K Services Canada was named one of the “Best Employers in Canada” for eleven consecutive years.

G&K Services was named to “The Green 30” list in Canada for their commitment to environmental stewardship in 2010.

G&K Services in Albuquerque received a 2011 Gold Award from the Albuquerque Bernalillo County Water Utility Authority.

G&K Services in Denver received a 2012 Gold Award from the Denver Metropolitan Wastewater Reclamation District for compliance with wastewater pretreatment requirements and a demonstrated commitment to environmental excellence.

G&K Services in Los Angeles was recognized by the Los Angeles County Sanitation District for full compliance with wastewater discharge requirements.
