= Worldwide Responsible Accredited Production =

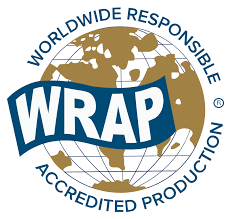
- Abbreviation: WRAP
- Formation: 2000; 26 years ago
- Legal status: Active
- Headquarters: Arlington, Virginia, US
- Website: www.wrapcompliance.org

Worldwide Responsible Accredited Production (WRAP), formerly Worldwide Responsible Apparel Production, is an independent, objective, nonprofit team of global social compliance experts dedicated to promoting safe, lawful, humane, and ethical manufacturing around the world through certification and education. WRAP is headquartered in Arlington, Virginia, and has branch offices in Hong Kong and Bangladesh as well as representatives in Europe, India, Indonesia, Thailand, Vietnam, and Latin America. WRAP certification is accepted by hundreds of preeminent brands and retailers around the world, including Walmart, Disney, Costco, Kmart, Fruit of the Loom, Gildan, Jockey, Woolworths, and Medline.

WRAP’s certification program seeks to independently monitor and certify compliance using the 12 WRAP Principles, which are based on the rule of law within each country and include the spirit or language of relevant International Labour Organization (ILO) conventions. The first nine principles cover child and forced labor, health and safety, harassment and abuse, discrimination, hours of work, compensation and benefits, and freedom of association. The principle on environment serves to demonstrate a facility’s commitment to environmentally responsible business practices. The final two principles, on customs compliance and security, ensure shipments of goods comply with applicable customs laws and that no non‐manifested cargo (drugs, bombs, etc.) is transported alongside finished products. WRAP-certified facilities demonstrate compliance with U.S. CTPAT Guidelines for Foreign Manufacturers.

The organization was established in 2000 by the American Apparel and Footwear Association. By 2008 it had certified 1700 factories in 60 countries and issued 1100 certificates in that year. In February 2018, WRAP became the official Corporate Social Responsibility partner of the American Apparel and Footwear Association.
