= Dakoda Armstrong =

American racing driver (born 1991)

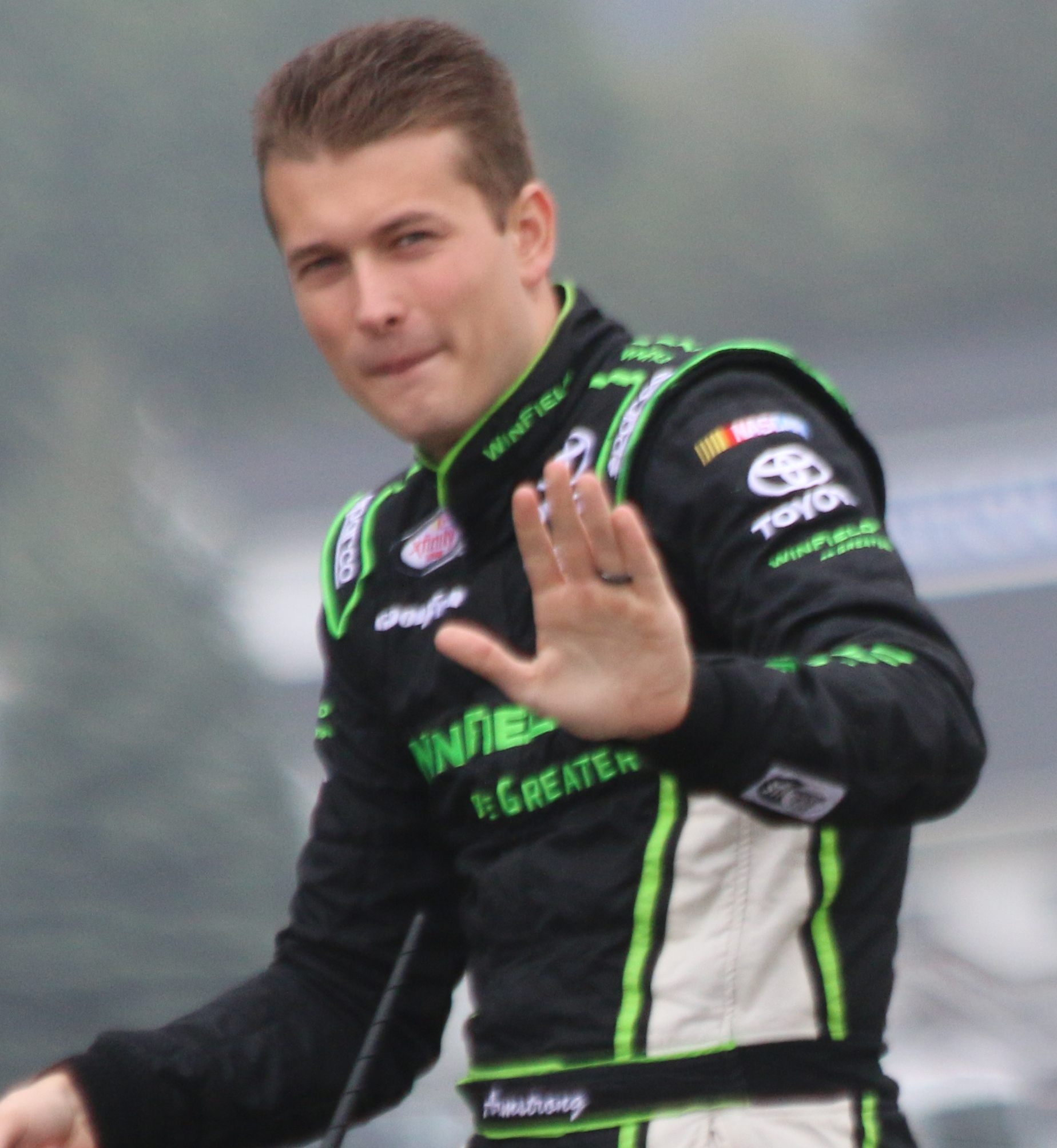
- Armstrong at Road America in 2016
- Born: July 16, 1991 (age 35); New Castle, Indiana, U.S.
- Achievements: 1998 WKA National champion 2000, 2001 Nascart champion 2004 USAC Kenyon Midget champion
- Awards: 2010 ARCA Racing Series Rookie of the Year

NASCAR O'Reilly Auto Parts Series career
- 133 races run over 6 years
- 2017 position: 17th
- Best finish: 13th (2014, 2015, 2016)
- First race: 2012 Ford EcoBoost 300 (Homestead)
- Last race: 2017 VisitMyrtleBeach.com 300 (Kentucky)
Wins	Top tens	Poles
0	8	1

NASCAR FedEx Freight Truck Series career
- 44 races run over 3 years
- 2013 position: 12th
- Best finish: 12th (2013)
- First race: 2011 Coca-Cola 200 (Iowa)
- Last race: 2013 Ford EcoBoost 200 (Homestead)
Wins	Top tens	Poles
0	5	0
- Statistics up to date as of September 23, 2017.

Dakoda Armstrong (born July 16, 1991) is an American professional stock car racing driver. He last competed part-time in the NASCAR Xfinity Series, driving the No. 28 Toyota Camry for JGL Racing.

== Early career ==
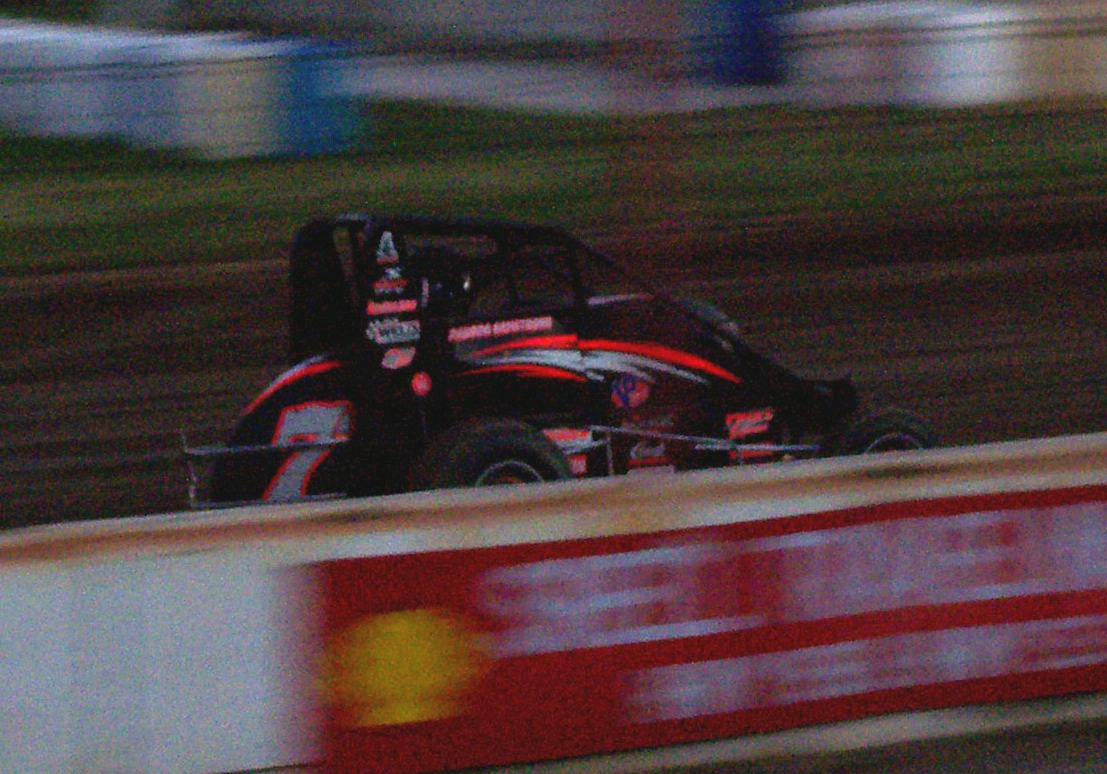
Armstrong's 2008 USAC Midget car

Armstrong started his racing career racing go-karts at the age of six, winning the 1998 World Karting Association championship in his first year in racing. At age 13, he became the youngest driver to win a USAC national championship when he won the 2004 USAC Mel Kenyon Midget Series. He has won over 200 races while competing in Go-Karts, Quarter Midgets, Bandoleros, Micro/Mini Sprints, Kenyon Midgets, 410 Non-Wing Sprint Cars, and Midgets.

From 2007 to 2010, Armstrong entered select races of the USAC Silver Crown Series, USAC National Sprint Car Championship and USAC National Midget Series.

== ARCA Racing Series ==
Armstrong signed a driver development deal with Penske Racing. As part of the deal, he would drive for Cunningham Motorsports in the ARCA Racing Series for seven races in 2009. He posted a best finish of third along with two other top-ten finishes and a 26th-place finish in the standings.

Armstrong returned to Cunningham Motorsports to drive the No. 22 Dodge full-time in 2010. He got his first win in just his 12th start at Talladega Superspeedway. He followed that with another win at Salem Speedway, finishing the season seventh in the standings with two wins, five top-fives, 12 top-tens, and one pole.

In 2011, Armstrong cut back on his ARCA schedule as he began focusing on his jump to NASCAR. He would run six races, posting one win at Winchester Speedway, two top-fives, four top-tens, and a 25th-place finish in the standings.

== NASCAR ==
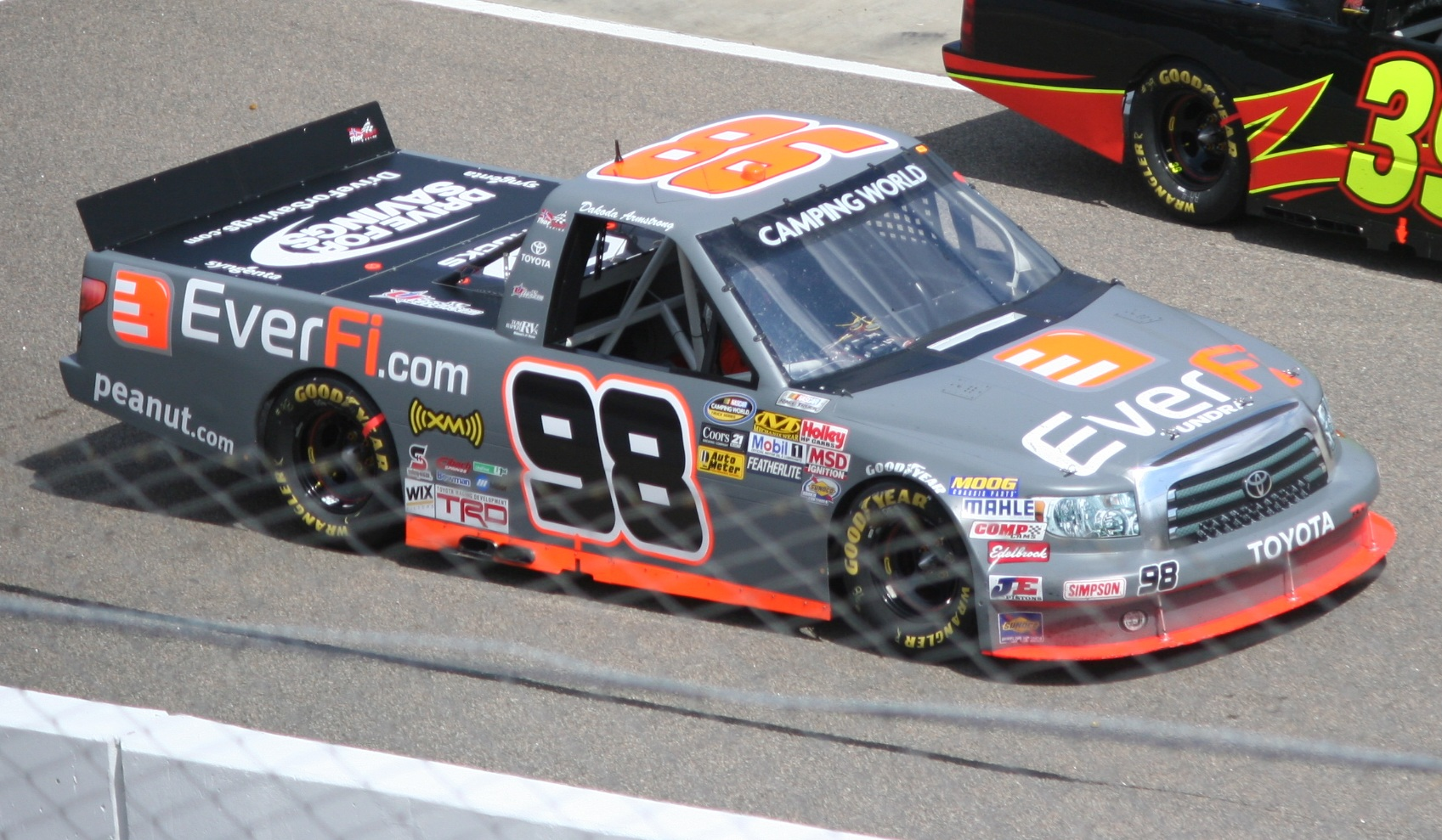
Armstrong's 2012 truck

=== Camping World Truck Series ===
In 2011, Armstrong signed on with ThorSport Racing and ran seven races with the team with crew chief Dan Stillman. He made his Camping World Truck Series debut July 17 at Iowa Speedway, finishing 21st. He posted his first top ten October 1 at Kentucky Speedway. Armstrong attempted to run full-time with ThorSport with sponsorship from EverFi in the Truck Series in 2012. He was released from the team before the race at Iowa Speedway in September due to poor performance.

In February 2013, it was announced that Armstrong would be driving for Turn One Racing for the full Truck Series season, and that he would also be running five races in the Nationwide Series for Richard Childress Racing in the No. 33 and No. 21 cars. He ran the No. 19 for TriStar Motorsports at Homestead-Miami. WinField sponsored all his races.

=== Xfinity Series ===
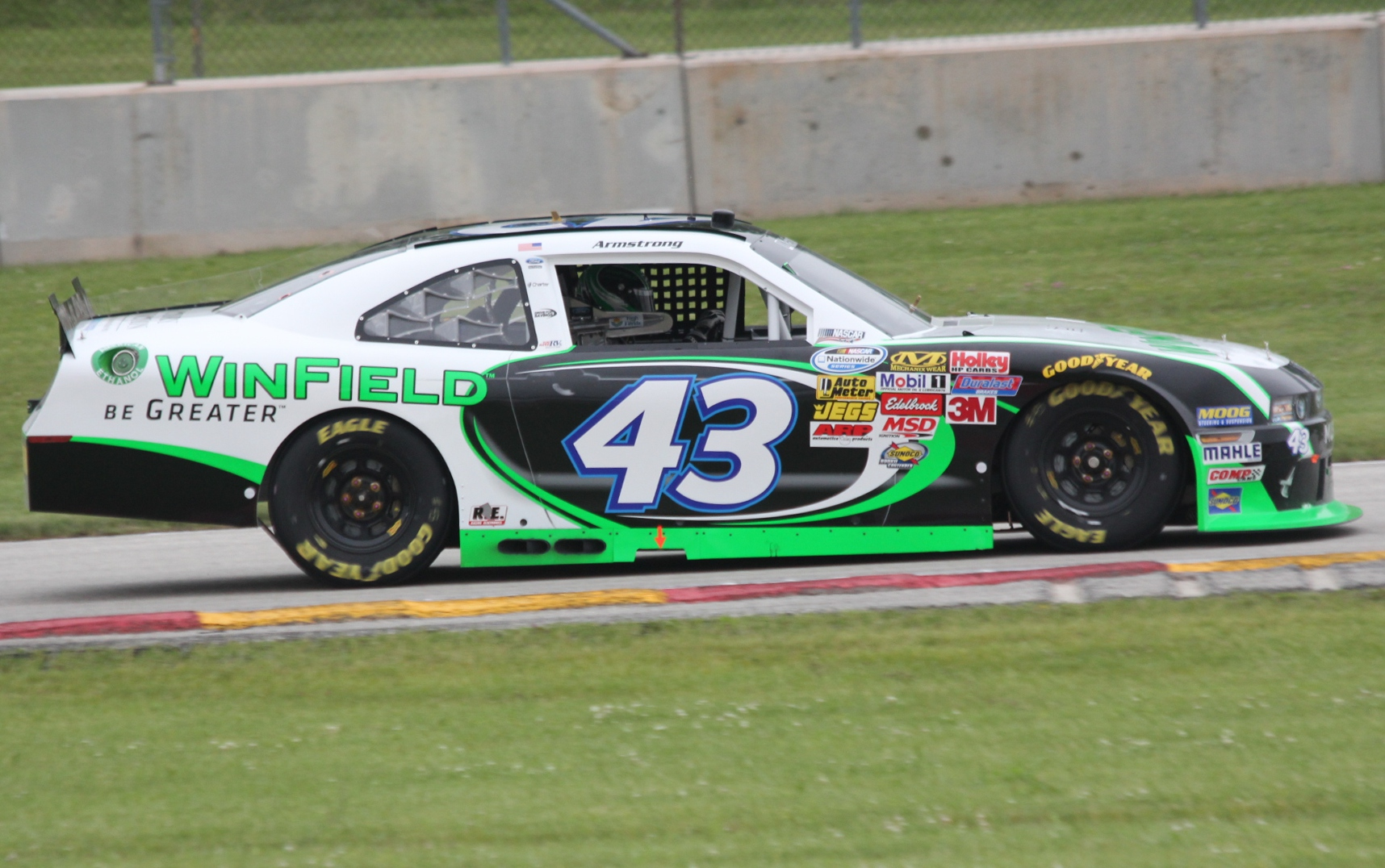
Armstrong racing at Road America in 2014

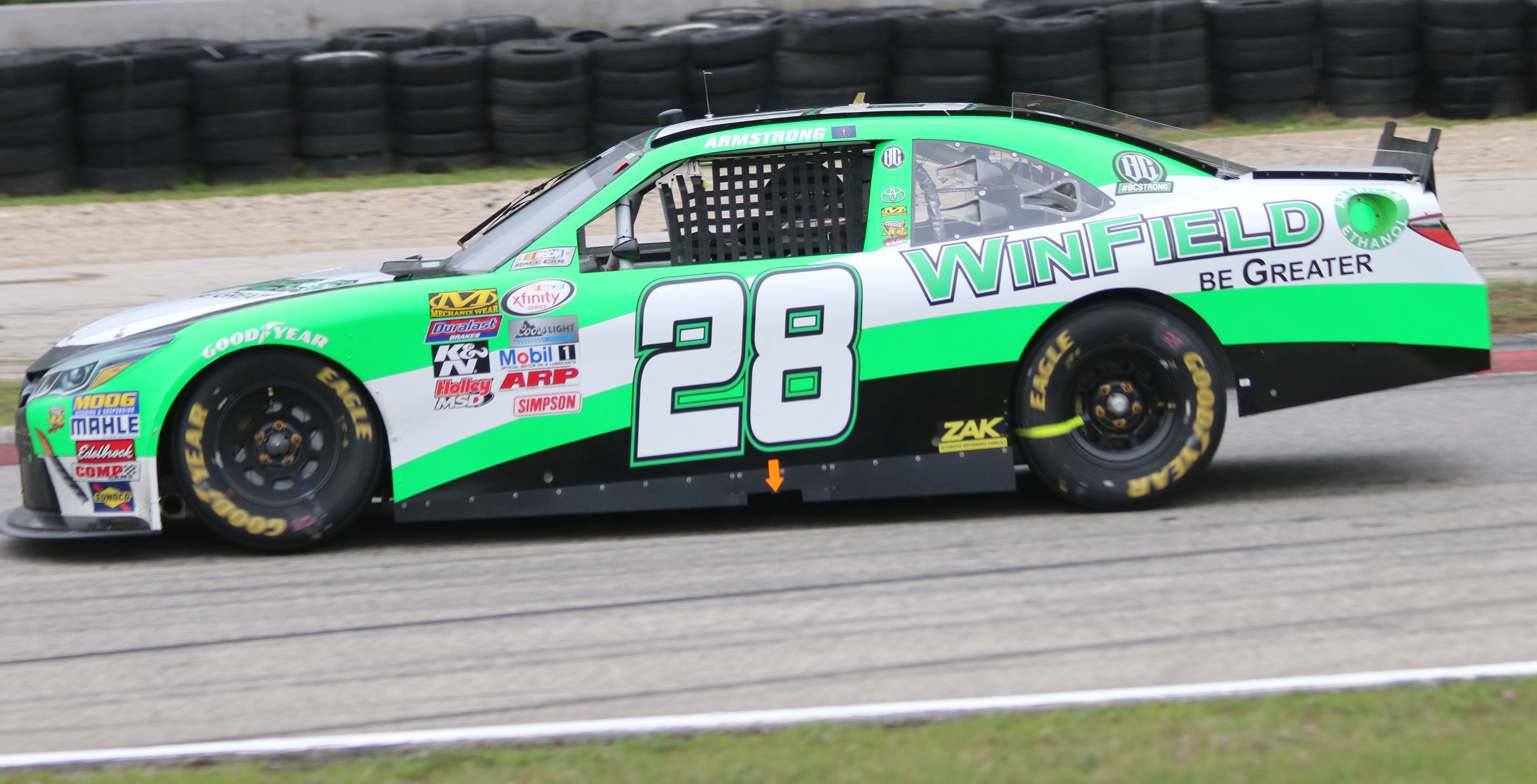
Armstrong's No. 28 JGL Racing car in 2016

On December 4, 2013, it was announced that Armstrong had been signed by Richard Petty Motorsports to compete full-time in the 2014 NASCAR Nationwide Series, driving the No. 43 Ford Mustang. At Daytona, Armstrong had his first career pole for the Subway Firecracker 250 at Daytona after qualifying was cancelled due to a rainshower. He would finish 13th in the points standings in 2014.

Armstrong returned to Richard Petty Motorsports in 2015, with new chief Frank Kerr. He finished with a career best of sixth-place at Daytona after avoiding two Big Ones. On November 23, it was announced that he and RPM had parted ways due to poor performance.

Armstrong joined JGL Racing in 2016, driving the No. 28 Toyota Camry. He would then return to JGL Racing in 2017. This 2017 season, he scored two top-five finishes: At Iowa Speedway, on June 24, for the race of 2017 American Ethanol E15 250, he finished fifth place, but on 4 July weekend on July 1 (was supposed to be June 30, but postponed because of persistent rain) for the race of 2017 Coca-Cola Firecracker 250, he scored a career-best of third place. However, Armstrong was released by the team on September 25 for a lack of sponsorship. Later in the season, Armstrong was seen in the JGL pit area, though he did not clarify if he had any role with the organization.

== Later career ==
In 2018, Armstrong finished 12th at the ARCA/CRA Super Series's Redbud 400 stock car race at Anderson Speedway.

In 2021, Armstrong entered two USAC Sprints non-points races at the Indianapolis Raceway Park, finishing fifth at the Thursday Night Thunder Homecoming and tenth at the Hoosier Classic.

In 2022, Armstrong finished second at Anderson's Little 500 sprint car race, and was runner-up at the Indiana-based 500 Sprint Car Tour. He also entered four USAC Midgets non-points races at the Indianapolis Raceway Park, with a best result of third at the Carb Night Classic.

== Personal life ==
Beyond the racetrack, Armstrong's Indiana family corn and grain farming operation produces 1.9 million gallons of ethanol fuel per year for various energy programs. While growing up on the farm, he worked on his own racecars in the facilities on his family's property. Aside from racing, Armstrong enjoys getting back to his roots and attends open wheel events whenever he can, especially if he can be at the track to mentor his younger siblings when they're racing. His hobbies also include working out, racing his friends in iRacing and watching football. On February 5, 2017, Armstrong married Karlee Hensley.

Dakoda's younger cousin Caleb (born 1992) and younger brother Dalton (born 1994), are both racing drivers as well. Caleb was a developmental driver for Venturini Motorsports like his cousin, competing in a few ARCA races for them in 2012 and 2013. Dalton has competed in the CARS Tour and marquee late model events such as the Winchester 400.

== Motorsports career results ==
=== NASCAR ===
(key) (Bold – Pole position awarded by qualifying time. Italics – Pole position earned by points standings or practice time. * – Most laps led.)

==== Xfinity Series ====
NASCAR Xfinity Series results
Year	Team	No.	Make	1	2	3	4	5	6	7	8	9	10	11	12	13	14	15	16	17	18	19	20	21	22	23	24	25	26	27	28	29	30	31	32	33	NXSC	Pts	Ref
2012	Turner Motorsports	30	Chevy	DAY	PHO	LVS	BRI	CAL	TEX	RCH	TAL	DAR	IOW	CLT	DOV	MCH	ROA	KEN	DAY	NHA	CHI	IND	IOW	GLN	CGV	BRI	ATL	RCH	CHI	KEN	DOV	CLT	KAN	TEX	PHO	HOM; 25	135th	0^{1}	
2013	Richard Childress Racing	33	Chevy	DAY	PHO	LVS	BRI	CAL; 15	TEX	RCH	TAL	DAR																									112th	0^{1}	
2013	Richard Childress Racing	21	Chevy										CLT; 31	DOV	IOW	MIC	ROA	KEN	DAY	NHA	CHI; 15	IND	IOW	GLN	MOH	BRI	ATL	RCH	CHI	KEN; 13	DOV	KAN; 19	CLT	TEX	PHO		112th	0^{1}	
2013	TriStar Motorsports	19	Toyota																																	HOM; 24	112th	0^{1}	
2014	Richard Petty Motorsports	43	Ford	DAY; 23	PHO; 18	LVS; 23	BRI; 24	CAL; 20	TEX; 22	DAR; 18	RCH; 17	TAL; 18	IOW; 21	CLT; 19	DOV; 16	MCH; 19	ROA; 25	KEN; 20	**DAY**; 19	NHA; 30	CHI; 20	IND; 17	IOW; 21	GLN; 25	MOH; 10	BRI; 28	ATL; 33	RCH; 7	CHI; 22	KEN; 19	DOV; 17	KAN; 25	CLT; 19	TEX; 10	PHO; 21	HOM; 20	13th	788	
2015	Richard Petty Motorsports	43	Ford	DAY; 11	ATL; 20	LVS; 30	PHO; 18	CAL; 36	TEX; 16	BRI; 23	RCH; 27	TAL; 22	IOW; 21	CLT; 16	DOV; 14	MCH; 16	CHI; 28	DAY; 6	KEN; 17	NHA; 16	IND; 19	IOW; 16	GLN; 23	MOH; 23	BRI; 24	ROA; 34	DAR; 18	RCH; 21	CHI; 15	KEN; 14	DOV; 20	CLT; 16	KAN; 20	TEX; 18	PHO; 18	HOM; 15	13th	803	
2016	JGL Racing	28	Toyota	DAY; 14	ATL; 21	LVS; 22	PHO; 18	CAL; 22	TEX; 26	BRI; 30	RCH; 14	TAL; 34	DOV; 21	CLT; 21	POC; 18	MCH; 24	IOW; 17	DAY; 12	KEN; 18	NHA; 17	IND; 20		GLN; 18	MOH; 21	BRI; 18	ROA; 13	DAR; 18	RCH; 16	CHI; 22	KEN; 18	DOV; 20	CLT; 19	KAN; 20	TEX; 20	PHO; 19	HOM; 19	13th	718	
2016	Joe Gibbs Racing	18	Toyota																			IOW; 5															13th	718	
2017	JGL Racing	28	Toyota	DAY; 12	ATL; 21	LVS; 20	PHO; 17	CAL; 20	TEX; 17	BRI; 19	RCH; 16	TAL; 22	CLT; 20	DOV; 19	POC; 20	MCH; 20	IOW; 5	DAY; 3	KEN; 17	NHA; 24	IND; 20	IOW; 17	GLN; 21	MOH; 10	BRI; 24	ROA; 22	DAR; 29	RCH; 18	CHI; 16	KEN; 23	DOV	CLT	KAN	TEX	PHO	HOM	17th	521	

^{*} Season still in progress
^{1} Ineligible for series points

==== Camping World Truck Series ====
NASCAR Camping World Truck Series results
Year	Team	No.	Make	1	2	3	4	5	6	7	8	9	10	11	12	13	14	15	16	17	18	19	20	21	22	23	24	25	NCWTC	Pts	Ref
2011	ThorSport Racing	98	Chevy	DAY	PHO	DAR	MAR	NSH	DOV	CLT	KAN	TEX	KEN	IOW; 21	NSH	IRP; 21	POC	MCH; 24	BRI	ATL	CHI; 20	NHA	KEN; 9	LVS	TAL; 17	MAR	TEX	HOM; 25	29th	172	
2012	ThorSport Racing	98	Toyota	DAY; 35	MAR; 21	CAR; 14	KAN; 15	CLT; 13	DOV; 20	TEX; 18	KEN; 13	IOW; 27	CHI; 16	POC; 12	MCH; 3	BRI; 30	ATL; 23	IOW											20th	370	
2012	Turner Motorsports	4	Chevy																KEN; 31	LVS	TAL	MAR	TEX	PHO	HOM				20th	370	
2013	Turn One Racing	60	Chevy	DAY; 19	MAR; 7	CAR; 17	KAN; 12	CLT; 12	DOV; 21	TEX; 11	KEN; 21	IOW; 10	ELD; 11	POC; 18	MCH; 13	BRI; 18	MSP; 19	IOW; 16	CHI; 17	LVS; 16	TAL; 5	MAR; 18	TEX; 17	PHO; 19	HOM; 23				12th	628	

==== Camping World East Series ====
Camping World East Series results
Year	Team	No.	Make	1	2	3	4	5	6	7	8	9	10	11	NCWEC	Pts	Ref
2009	Ken Schrader Racing	4	Chevy	GRE; 12	TRI; 7	IOW									24th	512	
2009	Ken Schrader Racing	52	Chevy				SBO; 17	GLN	NHA; 12	TMP	ADI	LRP	NHA	DOV	24th	512	

=== ARCA Racing Series ===
(key) (Bold – Pole position awarded by qualifying time. Italics – Pole position earned by points standings or practice time. * – Most laps led.)

ARCA Racing Series results
Year	Team	No.	Make	1	2	3	4	5	6	7	8	9	10	11	12	13	14	15	16	17	18	19	20	21	ARSC	Pts	Ref
2009	Venturini Motorsports	15	Chevy	DAY	SLM	CAR	TAL	KEN	TOL; 20	POC	MCH	MFD													26th	1415	
2009	Cunningham Motorsports	4	Dodge										IOW; 6	KEN; 11	BLN	POC; 29	ISF	CHI	TOL; 13	DSF	NJE	SLM; 3	KAN		26th	1415	
2009	Cunningham Motorsports	22	Dodge																					CAR; 8	26th	1415	
2010	Cunningham Motorsports	22	Dodge	DAY; 33	PBE; 14	SLM; 7	TEX; 12	**TAL**; 1	TOL; 7	POC; 8	MCH; 11	IOW; 4	MFD; 5	POC; 2	BLN; 6	NJE; 10	ISF; 9	CHI; 11	DSF; 11	TOL; 9	SLM; 1*	KAN; 11	CAR; 11		7th	4705	
2011	Cunningham Motorsports	22	Dodge	DAY; 20	TAL; 14	SLM; 8	TOL; 8	NJE	CHI	POC	MCH	WIN; 1	BLN	IOW	IRP; 4	POC	ISF	MAD	DSF	SLM	KAN	TOL			25th	1120	
2016	Venturini Motorsports	15	Toyota	DAY	NSH	SLM	TAL	TOL	NJE	POC	MCH	MAD	WIN; 9	IOW	IRP	POC	BLN	ISF	DSF	SLM	CHI	KEN	KAN		100th	185	

=== ASA STARS National Tour ===
(key) (Bold – Pole position awarded by qualifying time. Italics – Pole position earned by points standings or practice time. * – Most laps led. ** – All laps led.)

ASA STARS National Tour results
Year	Team	No.	Make	1	2	3	4	5	6	7	8	9	10	11	12	ASNTC	Pts	Ref
2024	Wauters Motorsports	5A	N/A	NSM	FIF	HCY	MAD	MLW	AND; 8	OWO	TOL	WIN	NSV			44th	39	
2025	Wauters Motorsports	5	N/A	NSM	FIF	DOM	HCY	NPS	MAD	SLG	AND; 17	OWO	TOL	WIN	NSV	60th	35	
