= 2017 Kansas Lottery 300 =

30th race of the 2017 NASCAR Xfinity Series

Race details
- Race 30 of 33 in the 2017 NASCAR Xfinity Series
- Date: October 21, 2017
- Official name: 17th Annual Kansas Lottery 300
- Location: Kansas City, Kansas, Kansas Speedway
- Course: Permanent racing facility
- Course length: 1.5 miles (2.41 km)
- Distance: 200 laps, 300 mi (482.803 km)
- Scheduled distance: 200 laps, 300 mi (482.803 km)
- Average speed: 141.158 miles per hour (227.172 km/h)

Pole position
Driver	Tyler Reddick	Chip Ganassi Racing
- Time: 29.815

Most laps led
Driver	Erik Jones	Joe Gibbs Racing
- Laps: 186

Winner
No. 18	Christopher Bell	Joe Gibbs Racing

Television in the United States
- Network: NBC
- Announcers: Rick Allen, Jeff Burton, Steve Letarte

Radio in the United States
- Radio: Motor Racing Network

The 2017 Kansas Lottery 300 was the 30th stock car race of the 2017 NASCAR Xfinity Series season, the first race of the Round of 8, and the 17th iteration of the event. The race was held on Saturday, October 21, 2017, in Kansas City, Kansas at Kansas Speedway, a 1.500 miles (2.414 km) permanent paved oval-shaped racetrack. The race took the scheduled 200 laps to complete. In a wild finish, Christopher Bell, driving for Joe Gibbs Racing, would manage to defend against the dominant Erik Jones to win his first career NASCAR Xfinity Series victory and his only victory of the season. To fill out the podium, Tyler Reddick, driving for Chip Ganassi Racing, and Ryan Blaney, driving for Team Penske, would finish second and third, respectively.

== Entry list ==
- (R) denotes rookie driver.
- (i) denotes driver who is ineligible for series driver points.

#	Driver	Team	Make
0	Garrett Smithley	JD Motorsports	Chevrolet
00	Cole Custer (R)	Stewart–Haas Racing	Ford
1	Elliott Sadler	JR Motorsports	Chevrolet
01	Harrison Rhodes	JD Motorsports	Chevrolet
2	Austin Dillon (i)	Richard Childress Racing	Chevrolet
3	Ty Dillon (i)	Richard Childress Racing	Chevrolet
4	Ross Chastain	JD Motorsports	Chevrolet
5	Michael Annett	JR Motorsports	Chevrolet
7	Justin Allgaier	JR Motorsports	Chevrolet
07	Spencer Boyd	SS-Green Light Racing	Chevrolet
8	B. J. McLeod	B. J. McLeod Motorsports	Chevrolet
9	William Byron (R)	JR Motorsports	Chevrolet
11	Blake Koch	Kaulig Racing	Chevrolet
13	Timmy Hill	MBM Motorsports	Dodge
14	J. J. Yeley	TriStar Motorsports	Toyota
15	Reed Sorenson (i)	JD Motorsports	Chevrolet
16	Ryan Reed	Roush Fenway Racing	Ford
18	Christopher Bell (i)	Joe Gibbs Racing	Toyota
19	Matt Tifft (R)	Joe Gibbs Racing	Toyota
20	Erik Jones (i)	Joe Gibbs Racing	Toyota
21	Daniel Hemric (R)	Richard Childress Racing	Chevrolet
22	Ryan Blaney (i)	Team Penske	Ford
23	Spencer Gallagher (R)	GMS Racing	Chevrolet
24	Dylan Lupton	JGL Racing	Toyota
33	Brandon Jones	Richard Childress Racing	Chevrolet
38	Jeff Green	RSS Racing	Chevrolet
39	Ryan Sieg	RSS Racing	Chevrolet
40	Bobby Dale Earnhardt	MBM Motorsports	Chevrolet
42	Tyler Reddick	Chip Ganassi Racing	Chevrolet
46	Quin Houff	Precision Performance Motorsports	Chevrolet
48	Brennan Poole	Chip Ganassi Racing	Chevrolet
51	Jeremy Clements	Jeremy Clements Racing	Chevrolet
52	Joey Gase	Jimmy Means Racing	Chevrolet
55	Josh Berry	NextGen Motorsports	Toyota
62	Brendan Gaughan	Richard Childress Racing	Chevrolet
74	Mike Harmon	Mike Harmon Racing	Dodge
78	Jennifer Jo Cobb (i)	B. J. McLeod Motorsports	Chevrolet
89	Morgan Shepherd	Shepherd Racing Ventures	Chevrolet
90	Mario Gosselin	King Autosport	Chevrolet
93	Gray Gaulding (i)	RSS Racing	Chevrolet
99	David Starr	BJMM with SS-Green Light Racing	Chevrolet
Official entry list

== Practice ==
=== First practice ===
The first practice session was held on Friday, October 20, at 1:30 PM CST. The session would last for 55 minutes. Matt Tifft, driving for Joe Gibbs Racing, would set the fastest time in the session, with a lap of 30.348 and an average speed of 177.936 mph (286.360 km/h).

Pos.	#	Driver	Team	Make	Time	Speed
1	19	Matt Tifft (R)	Joe Gibbs Racing	Toyota	30.348	177.936
2	22	Ryan Blaney (i)	Team Penske	Ford	30.430	177.456
3	20	Erik Jones (i)	Joe Gibbs Racing	Toyota	30.551	176.754
Full first practice results

=== Second and final practice ===
The final practice session, sometimes known as Happy Hour, was held on Friday, October 20, at 4:00 PM CST. The session would last for 55 minutes. Erik Jones, driving for Joe Gibbs Racing, would set the fastest time in the session, with a lap of 30.476 and an average speed of 177.189 mph (285.158 km/h).

Pos.	#	Driver	Team	Make	Time	Speed
1	20	Erik Jones (i)	Joe Gibbs Racing	Toyota	30.476	177.189
2	22	Ryan Blaney (i)	Team Penske	Ford	30.645	176.211
3	39	Ryan Sieg	RSS Racing	Chevrolet	30.655	176.154
Full Happy Hour practice results

== Qualifying ==
Qualifying was held on Saturday, October 21, at 11:05 AM CST. Since Kansas Speedway is under 2 miles (3.2 km) in length, the qualifying system was a multi-car system that included three rounds. The first round was 15 minutes, where every driver would be able to set a lap within the 15 minutes. Then, the second round would consist of the fastest 24 cars in Round 1, and drivers would have 10 minutes to set a lap. Round 3 consisted of the fastest 12 drivers from Round 2, and the drivers would have 5 minutes to set a time. Whoever was fastest in Round 3 would win the pole.

Tyler Reddick, driving for Chip Ganassi Racing, would win the pole after setting a time of 29.815 and an average speed of 181.117 mph (291.480 km/h) in the third round.

Mike Harmon was the only driver to fail to qualify.

=== Full qualifying results ===
Pos.	#	Driver	Team	Make	Time (R1)	Speed (R1)	Time (R2)	Speed (R2)	Time (R3)	Speed (R3)
1	42	Tyler Reddick	Chip Ganassi Racing	Chevrolet	30.388	177.702	29.877	180.741	29.815	181.117
2	20	Erik Jones (i)	Joe Gibbs Racing	Toyota	30.040	179.760	29.844	180.941	29.830	181.026
3	22	Ryan Blaney (i)	Team Penske	Ford	30.202	178.796	29.887	180.681	29.980	180.120
4	18	Christopher Bell (i)	Joe Gibbs Racing	Toyota	30.252	178.501	29.983	180.102	30.097	179.420
5	2	Austin Dillon (i)	Richard Childress Racing	Chevrolet	30.736	175.690	30.029	179.826	30.125	179.253
6	9	William Byron (R)	JR Motorsports	Chevrolet	30.487	177.125	30.090	179.462	30.153	179.087
7	00	Cole Custer (R)	Stewart–Haas Racing	Ford	30.290	178.277	30.115	179.313	30.163	179.027
8	19	Matt Tifft (R)	Joe Gibbs Racing	Toyota	30.438	177.410	30.047	179.718	30.209	178.755
9	48	Brennan Poole	Chip Ganassi Racing	Chevrolet	30.377	177.766	30.186	178.891	30.242	178.560
10	21	Daniel Hemric (R)	Richard Childress Racing	Chevrolet	30.426	177.480	30.242	178.560	30.245	178.542
11	1	Elliott Sadler	JR Motorsports	Chevrolet	30.562	176.690	30.194	178.843	30.286	178.300
12	33	Brandon Jones	Richard Childress Racing	Chevrolet	30.685	175.982	30.212	178.737	30.313	178.141
Eliminated in Round 2
13	7	Justin Allgaier	JR Motorsports	Chevrolet	30.288	178.288	30.246	178.536	-	-
14	23	Spencer Gallagher (R)	GMS Racing	Chevrolet	30.657	176.142	30.312	178.147	-	-
15	16	Ryan Reed	Roush Fenway Racing	Ford	30.789	175.387	30.437	177.416	-	-
16	3	Ty Dillon (i)	Richard Childress Racing	Chevrolet	30.798	175.336	30.448	177.352	-	-
17	39	Ryan Sieg	RSS Racing	Chevrolet	30.912	174.689	30.521	176.927	-	-
18	11	Blake Koch	Kaulig Racing	Chevrolet	30.822	175.200	30.561	176.696	-	-
19	24	Dylan Lupton	JGL Racing	Toyota	30.745	175.638	30.573	176.626	-	-
20	5	Michael Annett	JR Motorsports	Chevrolet	30.946	174.498	30.580	176.586	-	-
21	4	Ross Chastain	JD Motorsports	Chevrolet	30.921	174.639	30.703	175.879	-	-
22	51	Jeremy Clements	Jeremy Clements Racing	Chevrolet	30.836	175.120	30.744	175.644	-	-
23	14	J. J. Yeley	TriStar Motorsports	Toyota	30.796	175.347	30.764	175.530	-	-
24	62	Brendan Gaughan	Richard Childress Racing	Chevrolet	30.768	175.507	31.329	172.364	-	-
Eliminated in Round 1
25	38	Jeff Green	RSS Racing	Chevrolet	30.961	174.413	-	-	-	-
26	8	B. J. McLeod	B. J. McLeod Motorsports	Chevrolet	31.010	174.137	-	-	-	-
27	15	Reed Sorenson (i)	JD Motorsports	Chevrolet	31.298	172.535	-	-	-	-
28	01	Harrison Rhodes	JD Motorsports	Chevrolet	31.334	172.337	-	-	-	-
29	93	Gray Gaulding (i)	RSS Racing	Chevrolet	31.344	172.282	-	-	-	-
30	13	Timmy Hill	MBM Motorsports	Dodge	31.364	172.172	-	-	-	-
31	46	Quin Houff	Precision Performance Motorsports	Chevrolet	31.408	171.931	-	-	-	-
32	99	David Starr	BJMM with SS-Green Light Racing	Chevrolet	31.449	171.707	-	-	-	-
33	55	Josh Berry	NextGen Motorsports	Toyota	31.537	171.227	-	-	-	-
Qualified by owner's points
34	0	Garrett Smithley	JD Motorsports	Chevrolet	31.731	170.181	-	-	-	-
35	52	Joey Gase	Jimmy Means Racing	Chevrolet	31.742	170.122	-	-	-	-
36	90	Mario Gosselin	King Autosport	Chevrolet	31.839	169.603	-	-	-	-
37	89	Morgan Shepherd	Shepherd Racing Ventures	Chevrolet	31.938	169.078	-	-	-	-
38	07	Spencer Boyd	SS-Green Light Racing	Chevrolet	32.991	163.681	-	-	-	-
39	78	Jennifer Jo Cobb (i)	B. J. McLeod Motorsports	Chevrolet	33.006	163.607	-	-	-	-
40	40	Bobby Dale Earnhardt	MBM Motorsports	Chevrolet	33.413	161.614	-	-	-	-
Failed to qualify
41	74	Mike Harmon	Mike Harmon Racing	Dodge	-	-	-	-	-	-
Official qualifying results
Official starting lineup

== Race results ==
Stage 1 Laps: 45

Pos.	#	Driver	Team	Make	Pts
1	20	Erik Jones (i)	Joe Gibbs Racing	Toyota	0
2	22	Ryan Blaney (i)	Team Penske	Ford	0
3	42	Tyler Reddick	Chip Ganassi Racing	Chevrolet	8
4	2	Austin Dillon (i)	Richard Childress Racing	Chevrolet	0
5	18	Christopher Bell (i)	Joe Gibbs Racing	Toyota	0
6	1	Elliott Sadler	JR Motorsports	Chevrolet	5
7	48	Brennan Poole	Chip Ganassi Racing	Chevrolet	4
8	7	Justin Allgaier	JR Motorsports	Chevrolet	3
9	21	Daniel Hemric (R)	Richard Childress Racing	Chevrolet	2
10	00	Cole Custer (R)	Stewart–Haas Racing	Ford	1

Stage 2 Laps: 45

Pos	#	Driver	Team	Make	Pts
1	20	Erik Jones (i)	Joe Gibbs Racing	Toyota	0
2	22	Ryan Blaney (i)	Team Penske	Ford	0
3	7	Justin Allgaier	JR Motorsports	Chevrolet	8
4	18	Christopher Bell (i)	Joe Gibbs Racing	Toyota	0
5	42	Tyler Reddick	Chip Ganassi Racing	Chevrolet	6
6	9	William Byron (R)	JR Motorsports	Chevrolet	5
7	00	Cole Custer (R)	Stewart–Haas Racing	Ford	4
8	48	Brennan Poole	Chip Ganassi Racing	Chevrolet	3
9	21	Daniel Hemric (R)	Richard Childress Racing	Chevrolet	2
10	2	Austin Dillon (i)	Richard Childress Racing	Chevrolet	0

Stage 3 Laps: 110

Pos	#	Driver	Team	Make	Laps	Led	Status	Pts
1	18	Christopher Bell (i)	Joe Gibbs Racing	Toyota	200	4	running	0
2	42	Tyler Reddick	Chip Ganassi Racing	Chevrolet	200	3	running	49
3	22	Ryan Blaney (i)	Team Penske	Ford	200	3	running	0
4	9	William Byron (R)	JR Motorsports	Chevrolet	200	0	running	38
5	7	Justin Allgaier	JR Motorsports	Chevrolet	200	0	running	43
6	2	Austin Dillon (i)	Richard Childress Racing	Chevrolet	200	0	running	0
7	1	Elliott Sadler	JR Motorsports	Chevrolet	200	0	running	35
8	19	Matt Tifft (R)	Joe Gibbs Racing	Toyota	200	0	running	29
9	3	Ty Dillon (i)	Richard Childress Racing	Chevrolet	200	4	running	0
10	16	Ryan Reed	Roush Fenway Racing	Ford	200	0	running	27
11	33	Brandon Jones	Richard Childress Racing	Chevrolet	200	0	running	26
12	48	Brennan Poole	Chip Ganassi Racing	Chevrolet	200	0	running	32
13	62	Brendan Gaughan	Richard Childress Racing	Chevrolet	200	0	running	24
14	5	Michael Annett	JR Motorsports	Chevrolet	199	0	running	23
15	20	Erik Jones (i)	Joe Gibbs Racing	Toyota	199	186	running	0
16	24	Dylan Lupton	JGL Racing	Toyota	199	0	running	21
17	4	Ross Chastain	JD Motorsports	Chevrolet	199	0	running	20
18	21	Daniel Hemric (R)	Richard Childress Racing	Chevrolet	199	0	running	23
19	00	Cole Custer (R)	Stewart–Haas Racing	Ford	198	0	running	23
20	14	J. J. Yeley	TriStar Motorsports	Toyota	198	0	running	17
21	23	Spencer Gallagher (R)	GMS Racing	Chevrolet	197	0	running	16
22	46	Quin Houff	Precision Performance Motorsports	Chevrolet	196	0	running	15
23	11	Blake Koch	Kaulig Racing	Chevrolet	196	0	running	14
24	01	Harrison Rhodes	JD Motorsports	Chevrolet	195	0	running	13
25	51	Jeremy Clements	Jeremy Clements Racing	Chevrolet	195	0	running	12
26	39	Ryan Sieg	RSS Racing	Chevrolet	194	0	running	11
27	99	David Starr	BJMM with SS-Green Light Racing	Chevrolet	194	0	running	10
28	0	Garrett Smithley	JD Motorsports	Chevrolet	192	0	running	9
29	90	Mario Gosselin	King Autosport	Chevrolet	192	0	running	8
30	52	Joey Gase	Jimmy Means Racing	Chevrolet	192	0	running	7
31	40	Bobby Dale Earnhardt	MBM Motorsports	Chevrolet	188	0	running	6
32	8	B. J. McLeod	B. J. McLeod Motorsports	Chevrolet	188	0	running	5
33	07	Spencer Boyd	SS-Green Light Racing	Chevrolet	188	0	running	4
34	55	Josh Berry	NextGen Motorsports	Toyota	182	0	engine	3
35	78	Jennifer Jo Cobb (i)	B. J. McLeod Motorsports	Chevrolet	139	0	running	0
36	13	Timmy Hill	MBM Motorsports	Dodge	36	0	vibration	1
37	89	Morgan Shepherd	Shepherd Racing Ventures	Chevrolet	24	0	suspension	1
38	15	Reed Sorenson (i)	JD Motorsports	Chevrolet	7	0	handling	0
39	93	Gray Gaulding (i)	RSS Racing	Chevrolet	3	0	brakes	0
40	38	Jeff Green	RSS Racing	Chevrolet	2	0	handling	1
Official race results

== Standings after the race ==
Drivers' Championship standings

	Pos	Driver	Points
1	1	Justin Allgaier	3,066
1	2	William Byron	3,064 (-2)
	3	Elliott Sadler	3,055 (-11)
2	4	Brennan Poole	3,038 (–28)
1	5	Matt Tifft	3,033 (–33)
1	6	Ryan Reed	3,032 (-34)
3	7	Daniel Hemric	3,032 (-34)
1	8	Cole Custer	3,030 (-36)
	9	Brendan Gaughan	2,103 (-963)
1	10	Michael Annett	2,081 (-985)
1	11	Jeremy Clements	2,064 (-1,002)
1	12	Blake Koch	2,059 (-1,007)
Official driver's standings

- Note: Only the first 12 positions are included for the driver standings.

Previous race: 2017 Drive for the Cure 300	NASCAR Xfinity Series; 2017 season	Next race: 2017 O'Reilly Auto Parts 300
