= 2017 Drive for the Cure 300 =

29th race of the 2017 NASCAR Xfinity Series

Race details
- Race 29 of 33 in the 2017 NASCAR Xfinity Series
- Date: October 7, 2017
- Location: Concord, North Carolina, Charlotte Motor Speedway
- Course: Permanent racing facility
- Course length: 1.5 miles (2.41 km)
- Distance: 200 laps, 300 mi (482.803 km)
- Scheduled distance: 200 laps, 300 mi (482.803 km)
- Average speed: 122.685 miles per hour (197.442 km/h)

Pole position
Driver	Daniel Suárez	Joe Gibbs Racing
- Time: Set by 2017 owner's points

Most laps led
Driver	Daniel Suárez	Joe Gibbs Racing
- Laps: 111

Winner
No. 42	Alex Bowman	Chip Ganassi Racing

Television in the United States
- Network: NBCSN
- Announcers: Rick Allen, Jeff Burton, Steve Letarte

Radio in the United States
- Radio: Performance Racing Network

The 2017 Drive for the Cure 300 was the 29th stock car race of the 2017 NASCAR Xfinity Series season, the third and elimination race of the Round of 12, and the 36th iteration of the event. The race was held on Saturday, October 7, 2017, in Concord, North Carolina at Charlotte Motor Speedway, a 1.5 miles (2.4 km) permanent quad-oval. The race took the scheduled 200 laps to complete. Alex Bowman, driving for Chip Ganassi Racing, would control the late stages of the race to win his first and to date, only career NASCAR Xfinity Series victory and his only win of the season. To fill out the podium, Sam Hornish Jr. and Ryan Blaney, both driving for Team Penske, would finish second and third, respectively.

The eight drivers to advance to the Round of 8 were William Byron, Justin Allgaier, Elliott Sadler, Daniel Hemric, Cole Custer, Brennan Poole, Ryan Reed, and Matt Tifft.

== Entry list ==
- (R) denotes rookie driver.
- (i) denotes driver who is ineligible for series driver points.

#	Driver	Team	Make
0	Garrett Smithley	JD Motorsports	Chevrolet
00	Cole Custer (R)	Stewart–Haas Racing	Ford
1	Elliott Sadler	JR Motorsports	Chevrolet
01	Harrison Rhodes	JD Motorsports	Chevrolet
2	Austin Dillon (i)	Richard Childress Racing	Chevrolet
3	Ty Dillon (i)	Richard Childress Racing	Chevrolet
4	Ross Chastain	JD Motorsports	Chevrolet
5	Michael Annett	JR Motorsports	Chevrolet
7	Justin Allgaier	JR Motorsports	Chevrolet
07	Ray Black Jr.	SS-Green Light Racing	Chevrolet
8	B. J. McLeod	B. J. McLeod Motorsports	Chevrolet
9	William Byron (R)	JR Motorsports	Chevrolet
11	Blake Koch	Kaulig Racing	Chevrolet
12	Sam Hornish Jr.	Team Penske	Ford
13	Timmy Hill	MBM Motorsports	Dodge
14	J. J. Yeley	TriStar Motorsports	Toyota
15	Reed Sorenson (i)	JD Motorsports	Chevrolet
16	Ryan Reed	Roush Fenway Racing	Ford
18	Daniel Suárez (i)	Joe Gibbs Racing	Toyota
19	Matt Tifft (R)	Joe Gibbs Racing	Toyota
20	Erik Jones (i)	Joe Gibbs Racing	Toyota
21	Daniel Hemric (R)	Richard Childress Racing	Chevrolet
22	Ryan Blaney (i)	Team Penske	Ford
23	Spencer Gallagher (R)	GMS Racing	Chevrolet
24	Corey LaJoie (i)	JGL Racing	Toyota
33	Brandon Jones	Richard Childress Racing	Chevrolet
38	Jeff Green	RSS Racing	Chevrolet
39	Ryan Sieg	RSS Racing	Chevrolet
40	Chad Finchum	MBM Motorsports	Toyota
42	Alex Bowman (i)	Chip Ganassi Racing	Chevrolet
48	Brennan Poole	Chip Ganassi Racing	Chevrolet
51	Jeremy Clements	Jeremy Clements Racing	Chevrolet
52	Joey Gase	Jimmy Means Racing	Chevrolet
62	Brendan Gaughan	Richard Childress Racing	Chevrolet
74	Mike Harmon	Mike Harmon Racing	Dodge
78	Angela Ruch	B. J. McLeod Motorsports	Chevrolet
89	Morgan Shepherd	Shepherd Racing Ventures	Chevrolet
90	Mario Gosselin	King Autosport	Chevrolet
92	Dexter Bean	King Autosport	Chevrolet
93	Gray Gaulding (i)	RSS Racing	Chevrolet
99	David Starr	BJMM with SS-Green Light Racing	Chevrolet
Official entry list

== Practice ==
=== First practice ===
The first practice session was held on Friday, October 6, at 3:00 PM EST. The session would last for 55 minutes. Justin Allgaier, driving for JR Motorsports, would set the fastest time in the session, with a lap of 29.721 and an average speed of 181.690 mph (292.402 km/h).

Pos	#	Driver	Team	Make	Time	Speed
1	7	Justin Allgaier	JR Motorsports	Chevrolet	29.721	181.690
2	42	Alex Bowman (i)	Chip Ganassi Racing	Chevrolet	29.889	180.668
3	9	William Byron (R)	JR Motorsports	Chevrolet	29.892	180.650
Full first practice results

=== Second and final practice ===
The final practice session, sometimes known as Happy Hour, was held on Friday, October 6, at 6:00 PM EST. The session would last for 55 minutes. Sam Hornish Jr., driving for Team Penske, would set the fastest time in the session, with a lap of 29.602 and an average speed of 182.420 mph (293.577 km/h).

Pos	#	Driver	Team	Make	Time	Speed
1	12	Sam Hornish Jr.	Team Penske	Ford	29.602	182.420
2	22	Ryan Blaney (i)	Team Penske	Ford	29.728	181.647
3	19	Matt Tifft (R)	Joe Gibbs Racing	Toyota	29.762	181.439
Full Happy Hour practice results

== Qualifying ==
Qualifying was originally scheduled to be held on Saturday, October 7. However, inclement weather would cancel the session. The starting lineup was determined by the current owner's points. As a result, Daniel Suárez, driving for Joe Gibbs Racing, would win the pole.

=== Full starting lineup ===
Pos	#	Driver	Team	Make
1	18	Daniel Suárez (i)	Joe Gibbs Racing	Toyota
2	22	Ryan Blaney (i)	Team Penske	Ford
3	20	Erik Jones (i)	Joe Gibbs Racing	Toyota
4	42	Alex Bowman (i)	Chip Ganassi Racing	Chevrolet
5	7	Justin Allgaier	JR Motorsports	Chevrolet
6	9	William Byron (R)	JR Motorsports	Chevrolet
7	1	Elliott Sadler	JR Motorsports	Chevrolet
8	21	Daniel Hemric (R)	Richard Childress Racing	Chevrolet
9	48	Brennan Poole	Chip Ganassi Racing	Chevrolet
10	3	Ty Dillon (i)	Richard Childress Racing	Chevrolet
11	16	Ryan Reed	Roush Fenway Racing	Ford
12	2	Austin Dillon (i)	Richard Childress Racing	Chevrolet
13	00	Cole Custer (R)	Stewart–Haas Racing	Ford
14	19	Matt Tifft (R)	Joe Gibbs Racing	Toyota
15	11	Blake Koch	Kaulig Racing	Chevrolet
16	62	Brendan Gaughan	Richard Childress Racing	Chevrolet
17	5	Michael Annett	JR Motorsports	Chevrolet
18	24	Corey LaJoie (i)	JGL Racing	Toyota
19	14	J. J. Yeley	TriStar Motorsports	Toyota
20	4	Ross Chastain	JD Motorsports	Chevrolet
21	39	Ryan Sieg	RSS Racing	Chevrolet
22	33	Brandon Jones	Richard Childress Racing	Chevrolet
23	51	Jeremy Clements	Jeremy Clements Racing	Chevrolet
24	23	Spencer Gallagher (R)	GMS Racing	Chevrolet
25	07	Ray Black Jr.	SS-Green Light Racing	Chevrolet
26	52	Joey Gase	Jimmy Means Racing	Chevrolet
27	0	Garrett Smithley	JD Motorsports	Chevrolet
28	8	B. J. McLeod	B. J. McLeod Motorsports	Chevrolet
29	99	David Starr	BJMM with SS-Green Light Racing	Chevrolet
30	01	Harrison Rhodes	JD Motorsports	Chevrolet
31	12	Sam Hornish Jr.	Team Penske	Ford
32	38	Jeff Green	RSS Racing	Chevrolet
33	90	Mario Gosselin	King Autosport	Chevrolet
34	40	Chad Finchum	MBM Motorsports	Toyota
35	78	Angela Ruch	B. J. McLeod Motorsports	Chevrolet
36	74	Mike Harmon	Mike Harmon Racing	Dodge
37	13	Timmy Hill	MBM Motorsports	Dodge
38	93	Gray Gaulding (i)	RSS Racing	Chevrolet
39	89	Morgan Shepherd	Shepherd Racing Ventures	Chevrolet
40	15	Reed Sorenson (i)	JD Motorsports	Chevrolet
Failed to qualify
41	92	Dexter Bean	King Autosport	Chevrolet
Official starting lineup

== Race results ==
Stage 1 Laps: 45

Pos	#	Driver	Team	Make	Pts
1	20	Erik Jones (i)	Joe Gibbs Racing	Toyota	0
2	18	Daniel Suárez (i)	Joe Gibbs Racing	Toyota	0
3	22	Ryan Blaney (i)	Team Penske	Ford	0
4	7	Justin Allgaier	JR Motorsports	Chevrolet	7
5	21	Daniel Hemric (R)	Richard Childress Racing	Chevrolet	6
6	9	William Byron (R)	JR Motorsports	Chevrolet	5
7	42	Alex Bowman (i)	Chip Ganassi Racing	Chevrolet	0
8	2	Austin Dillon (i)	Richard Childress Racing	Chevrolet	0
9	00	Cole Custer (R)	Stewart–Haas Racing	Ford	2
10	12	Sam Hornish Jr.	Team Penske	Ford	1

Stage 2 Laps: 45

Pos	#	Driver	Team	Make	Pts
1	18	Daniel Suárez (i)	Joe Gibbs Racing	Toyota	0
2	20	Erik Jones (i)	Joe Gibbs Racing	Toyota	0
3	12	Sam Hornish Jr.	Team Penske	Ford	8
4	22	Ryan Blaney (i)	Team Penske	Ford	0
5	42	Alex Bowman (i)	Chip Ganassi Racing	Chevrolet	0
6	21	Daniel Hemric (R)	Richard Childress Racing	Chevrolet	5
7	9	William Byron (R)	JR Motorsports	Chevrolet	4
8	00	Cole Custer (R)	Stewart–Haas Racing	Ford	3
9	1	Elliott Sadler	JR Motorsports	Chevrolet	2
10	2	Austin Dillon (i)	Richard Childress Racing	Chevrolet	0

Stage 3 Laps: 110

Pos	#	Driver	Team	Make	Laps	Led	Status	Pts
1	42	Alex Bowman (i)	Chip Ganassi Racing	Chevrolet	200	32	running	0
2	12	Sam Hornish Jr.	Team Penske	Ford	200	0	running	44
3	22	Ryan Blaney (i)	Team Penske	Ford	200	38	running	0
4	2	Austin Dillon (i)	Richard Childress Racing	Chevrolet	200	0	running	0
5	48	Brennan Poole	Chip Ganassi Racing	Chevrolet	200	0	running	32
6	00	Cole Custer (R)	Stewart–Haas Racing	Ford	200	0	running	36
7	21	Daniel Hemric (R)	Richard Childress Racing	Chevrolet	200	0	running	41
8	18	Daniel Suárez (i)	Joe Gibbs Racing	Toyota	200	111	running	0
9	19	Matt Tifft (R)	Joe Gibbs Racing	Toyota	200	0	running	18
10	1	Elliott Sadler	JR Motorsports	Chevrolet	200	1	running	29
11	62	Brendan Gaughan	Richard Childress Racing	Chevrolet	200	0	running	26
12	16	Ryan Reed	Roush Fenway Racing	Ford	200	0	running	25
13	33	Brandon Jones	Richard Childress Racing	Chevrolet	200	0	running	24
14	4	Ross Chastain	JD Motorsports	Chevrolet	200	0	running	23
15	3	Ty Dillon (i)	Richard Childress Racing	Chevrolet	200	4	running	0
16	9	William Byron (R)	JR Motorsports	Chevrolet	200	6	running	30
17	24	Corey LaJoie (i)	JGL Racing	Toyota	200	0	running	0
18	39	Ryan Sieg	RSS Racing	Chevrolet	200	0	running	19
19	14	J. J. Yeley	TriStar Motorsports	Toyota	200	0	running	18
20	51	Jeremy Clements	Jeremy Clements Racing	Chevrolet	199	0	running	17
21	07	Ray Black Jr.	SS-Green Light Racing	Chevrolet	199	0	running	16
22	01	Harrison Rhodes	JD Motorsports	Chevrolet	199	1	running	15
23	0	Garrett Smithley	JD Motorsports	Chevrolet	199	0	running	14
24	90	Mario Gosselin	King Autosport	Chevrolet	199	0	running	13
25	11	Blake Koch	Kaulig Racing	Chevrolet	199	0	running	2
26	99	David Starr	BJMM with SS-Green Light Racing	Chevrolet	198	0	running	11
27	5	Michael Annett	JR Motorsports	Chevrolet	197	0	running	10
28	8	B. J. McLeod	B. J. McLeod Motorsports	Chevrolet	196	0	running	9
29	40	Chad Finchum	MBM Motorsports	Toyota	193	0	running	8
30	20	Erik Jones (i)	Joe Gibbs Racing	Toyota	192	7	running	0
31	52	Joey Gase	Jimmy Means Racing	Chevrolet	161	0	oil leak	6
32	74	Mike Harmon	Mike Harmon Racing	Dodge	160	0	suspension	5
33	7	Justin Allgaier	JR Motorsports	Chevrolet	112	0	overheating	11
34	23	Spencer Gallagher (R)	GMS Racing	Chevrolet	62	0	crash	3
35	13	Timmy Hill	MBM Motorsports	Dodge	52	0	steering	2
36	78	Angela Ruch	B. J. McLeod Motorsports	Chevrolet	36	0	crash	1
37	15	Reed Sorenson (i)	JD Motorsports	Chevrolet	15	0	electrical	0
38	89	Morgan Shepherd	Shepherd Racing Ventures	Chevrolet	13	0	handling	1
39	93	Gray Gaulding (i)	RSS Racing	Chevrolet	3	0	electrical	0
40	38	Jeff Green	RSS Racing	Chevrolet	2	0	steering	1
Official race results

== Standings after the race ==
Drivers' Championship standings

	Pos	Driver	Points
1	1	William Byron	3,026
1	2	Justin Allgaier	3,023 (-3)
	3	Elliott Sadler	3,020 (–6)
1	4	Daniel Hemric	3,009 (–17)
1	5	Cole Custer	3,007 (–19)
	6	Brennan Poole	3,006 (-20)
1	7	Ryan Reed	3,005 (-21)
1	8	Matt Tifft	3,004 (-22)
	9	Brendan Gaughan	2,079 (-947)
	10	Blake Koch	2,058 (-968)
	11	Michael Annett	2,055 (-971)
	12	Jeremy Clements	2,052 (-974)
Official driver's standings

- Note: Only the first 12 positions are included for the driver standings.

Previous race: 2017 Use Your Melon. Drive Sober 200	NASCAR Xfinity Series; 2017 season	Next race: 2017 Kansas Lottery 300
