= 2017 My Bariatric Solutions 300 =

Sixth race of the 2017 NASCAR Xfinity Series

Race details
- Race 6 of 33 in the 2017 NASCAR Xfinity Series
- Date: April 8, 2017
- Official name: 21st Annual My Bariatric Solutions 300
- Location: Fort Worth, Texas, Texas Motor Speedway
- Course: Permanent racing facility
- Course length: 1.5 miles (2.41 km)
- Distance: 200 laps, 300 mi (482.803 km)
- Scheduled distance: 200 laps, 300 mi (482.803 km)
- Average speed: 131.563 miles per hour (211.730 km/h)

Pole position
Driver	Joey Logano	Team Penske
- Time: 28.013

Most laps led
Driver	Erik Jones	Joe Gibbs Racing
- Laps: 112

Winner
No. 20	Erik Jones	Joe Gibbs Racing

Television in the United States
- Network: FOX
- Announcers: Adam Alexander, Michael Waltrip, Brad Keselowski

Radio in the United States
- Radio: Performance Racing Network

The 2017 My Bariatric Solutions 300 was the sixth stock car race of the 2017 NASCAR Xfinity Series season and the 21st iteration of the event. The race was held on Saturday, April 8, 2017, in Fort Worth, Texas, at Texas Motor Speedway, a 1.5 miles (2.4 km) permanent tri-oval shaped racetrack. The race took the scheduled 200 laps to complete. At race's end, Erik Jones, driving for Joe Gibbs Racing, would dominate the race to win his seventh career NASCAR Xfinity Series win and his first of the season. To fill out the podium, Ryan Blaney of Team Penske and Kevin Harvick of Stewart–Haas Racing would finish second and third, respectively.

== Entry list ==
- (R) denotes rookie driver.
- (i) denotes driver who is ineligible for series driver points.

#	Driver	Team	Make
00	Cole Custer (R)	Stewart–Haas Racing	Ford
0	Garrett Smithley	JD Motorsports	Chevrolet
1	Elliott Sadler	JR Motorsports	Chevrolet
01	Harrison Rhodes	JD Motorsports	Chevrolet
2	Austin Dillon (i)	Richard Childress Racing	Chevrolet
3	Ty Dillon (i)	Richard Childress Racing	Chevrolet
4	Ross Chastain	JD Motorsports	Chevrolet
5	Michael Annett	JR Motorsports	Chevrolet
6	Bubba Wallace	Roush Fenway Racing	Ford
7	Justin Allgaier	JR Motorsports	Chevrolet
07	Ray Black Jr.	SS-Green Light Racing	Chevrolet
8	Jeff Green	B. J. McLeod Motorsports	Chevrolet
9	William Byron (R)	JR Motorsports	Chevrolet
11	Blake Koch	Kaulig Racing	Chevrolet
12	Joey Logano (i)	Team Penske	Ford
13	Carl Long	MBM Motorsports	Toyota
14	J. J. Yeley	TriStar Motorsports	Toyota
16	Ryan Reed	Roush Fenway Racing	Ford
18	Daniel Suárez (i)	Joe Gibbs Racing	Toyota
19	Matt Tifft (R)	Joe Gibbs Racing	Toyota
20	Erik Jones (i)	Joe Gibbs Racing	Toyota
21	Daniel Hemric (R)	Richard Childress Racing	Chevrolet
22	Ryan Blaney (i)	Team Penske	Ford
23	Spencer Gallagher (R)	GMS Racing	Chevrolet
24	Jeb Burton	JGL Racing	Toyota
28	Dakoda Armstrong	JGL Racing	Toyota
33	Brandon Jones	Richard Childress Racing	Chevrolet
39	Ryan Sieg	RSS Racing	Chevrolet
40	Timmy Hill	MBM Motorsports	Chevrolet
41	Kevin Harvick (i)	Stewart–Haas Racing	Ford
42	Tyler Reddick	Chip Ganassi Racing	Chevrolet
48	Brennan Poole	Chip Ganassi Racing	Chevrolet
51	Jeremy Clements	Jeremy Clements Racing	Chevrolet
52	Joey Gase	Jimmy Means Racing	Chevrolet
62	Brendan Gaughan	Richard Childress Racing	Chevrolet
74	Mike Harmon	Mike Harmon Racing	Dodge
78	B. J. McLeod	B. J. McLeod Motorsports	Chevrolet
89	Morgan Shepherd*	Shepherd Racing Ventures	Chevrolet
90	Alex Labbé	King Autosport	Chevrolet
93	Jordan Anderson (i)	RSS Racing	Chevrolet
97	Stephen Leicht	Obaika Racing	Chevrolet
98	Casey Mears	Biagi–DenBeste Racing	Ford
99	David Starr	B. J. McLeod Motorsports with SS-Green Light Racing	Chevrolet
Official entry list

*Withdrew.

== Practice ==
=== First practice ===
The first practice session was held on Friday, April 7, at 1:30 PM CST, and would last for one hour and 25 minutes. Ty Dillon of Richard Childress Racing set the fastest time in the session with a lap of 28.909 and an average speed of 186.793 miles per hour (300.614 km/h).

Pos	#	Driver	Team	Make	Time	Speed
1	3	Ty Dillon (i)	Richard Childress Racing	Chevrolet	28.909	186.793
2	20	Erik Jones (i)	Joe Gibbs Racing	Toyota	28.924	186.696
3	2	Austin Dillon (i)	Richard Childress Racing	Chevrolet	29.068	185.771
Full first practice results

=== Final practice ===
The final practice session was held on Friday, April 7, at 4:00 PM CST and lasted for 55 minutes. Bubba Wallace of Roush Fenway Racing set the fastest time in the session, with a lap of 28.618 and an average speed of 188.692 miles per hour (303.670 km/h).

Pos	#	Driver	Team	Make	Time	Speed
1	6	Bubba Wallace	Roush Fenway Racing	Ford	28.618	188.692
2	33	Brandon Jones	Richard Childress Racing	Chevrolet	28.634	188.587
3	20	Erik Jones (i)	Joe Gibbs Racing	Toyota	28.777	187.650
Full final practice results

== Qualifying ==
Qualifying was held on Saturday, April 8, at 9:35 AM CST. Since Texas Motor Speedway is under 2 miles (3.2 km), the qualifying system was a multi-car system that included three rounds. The first round was 15 minutes, where every driver would be able to set a lap within the 15 minutes. Then, the second round would consist of the fastest 24 cars in Round 1, and drivers would have 10 minutes to set a lap. Round 3 consisted of the fastest 12 drivers from Round 2, and the drivers would have 5 minutes to set a time. Whoever was fastest in Round 3 would win the pole.

Joey Logano of Team Penske would win the pole after advancing from both preliminary rounds and setting the fastest lap in Round 3, with a time of 28.013 and an average speed of 192.768 miles per hour (310.230 km/h).

Two drivers would fail to qualify: Stephen Leicht and Mike Harmon.

=== Full qualifying results ===
Pos	#	Driver	Team	Make	Time (R1)	Speed (R1)	Time (R2)	Speed (R2)	Time (R3)	Speed (R3)
1	12	Joey Logano (i)	Team Penske	Ford	28.546	189.168	28.182	191.612	28.013	192.768
2	20	Erik Jones (i)	Joe Gibbs Racing	Toyota	28.357	190.429	28.032	192.637	28.086	192.267
3	2	Austin Dillon (i)	Richard Childress Racing	Chevrolet	28.509	189.414	28.329	190.617	28.092	192.226
4	22	Ryan Blaney (i)	Team Penske	Ford	28.293	190.860	28.359	190.416	28.119	192.041
5	9	William Byron (R)	JR Motorsports	Chevrolet	28.621	188.673	28.260	191.083	28.186	191.584
6	00	Cole Custer (R)	Stewart–Haas Racing	Ford	28.456	189.767	28.312	190.732	28.218	191.367
7	21	Daniel Hemric (R)	Richard Childress Racing	Chevrolet	28.666	188.376	28.296	190.840	28.245	191.184
8	6	Bubba Wallace	Roush Fenway Racing	Ford	28.515	189.374	28.266	191.042	28.283	190.927
9	16	Ryan Reed	Roush Fenway Racing	Ford	28.472	189.660	28.379	190.282	28.331	190.604
10	1	Elliott Sadler	JR Motorsports	Chevrolet	28.756	187.787	28.145	191.864	28.381	190.268
11	42	Tyler Reddick	Chip Ganassi Racing	Chevrolet	28.423	189.987	28.301	190.806	28.389	190.215
12	3	Ty Dillon (i)	Richard Childress Racing	Chevrolet	28.589	188.884	28.310	190.745	28.412	190.061
Eliminated in Round 2
13	33	Brandon Jones	Richard Childress Racing	Chevrolet	28.490	189.540	28.379	190.282	—	—
14	41	Kevin Harvick (i)	Stewart–Haas Racing	Ford	28.701	188.147	28.384	190.248	—	—
15	18	Daniel Suárez (i)	Joe Gibbs Racing	Toyota	28.438	189.887	28.423	189.987	—	—
16	23	Spencer Gallagher (R)	GMS Racing	Chevrolet	28.529	189.281	28.458	189.753	—	—
17	39	Ryan Sieg	RSS Racing	Chevrolet	28.600	188.811	28.482	189.593	—	—
18	11	Blake Koch	Kaulig Racing	Chevrolet	28.584	188.917	28.517	189.361	—	—
19	19	Matt Tifft (R)	Joe Gibbs Racing	Toyota	28.601	188.805	28.552	189.129	—	—
20	7	Justin Allgaier	JR Motorsports	Chevrolet	28.731	187.950	28.582	188.930	—	—
21	24	Jeb Burton	JGL Racing	Toyota	28.750	187.826	28.648	188.495	—	—
22	4	Ross Chastain	JD Motorsports	Chevrolet	28.687	188.239	28.840	187.240	—	—
23	28	Dakoda Armstrong	JGL Racing	Toyota	28.617	188.699	28.841	187.233	—	—
24	62	Brendan Gaughan	Richard Childress Racing	Chevrolet	28.755	187.793	29.004	186.181	—	—
Eliminated in Round 1
25	48	Brennan Poole	Chip Ganassi Racing	Chevrolet	28.757	187.780	—	—	—	—
26	98	Casey Mears	Biagi–DenBeste Racing	Ford	28.771	187.689	—	—	—	—
27	14	J. J. Yeley	TriStar Motorsports	Toyota	28.775	187.663	—	—	—	—
28	51	Jeremy Clements	Jeremy Clements Racing	Chevrolet	29.061	185.816	—	—	—	—
29	07	Ray Black Jr.	SS-Green Light Racing	Chevrolet	29.287	184.382	—	—	—	—
30	78	B. J. McLeod	B. J. McLeod Motorsports	Chevrolet	29.329	184.118	—	—	—	—
31	93	Jordan Anderson (i)	RSS Racing	Chevrolet	29.335	184.080	—	—	—	—
32	0	Garrett Smithley	JD Motorsports	Chevrolet	29.482	183.163	—	—	—	—
33	90	Alex Labbé	King Autosport	Chevrolet	29.506	183.014	—	—	—	—
Qualified by owner's points
34	5	Michael Annett	JR Motorsports	Chevrolet	29.537	182.822	—	—	—	—
35	52	Joey Gase	Jimmy Means Racing	Chevrolet	29.574	182.593	—	—	—	—
36	01	Harrison Rhodes	JD Motorsports	Chevrolet	29.584	182.531	—	—	—	—
37	40	Timmy Hill	MBM Motorsports	Chevrolet	29.649	182.131	—	—	—	—
38	99	David Starr	BJMM with SS-Green Light Racing	Chevrolet	29.715	181.726	—	—	—	—
39	13	Carl Long	MBM Motorsports	Toyota	29.910	180.542	—	—	—	—
40	8	Jeff Green	B. J. McLeod Motorsports	Chevrolet	30.065	179.611	—	—	—	—
Failed to qualify or withdrew
41	97	Stephen Leicht	Obaika Racing	Chevrolet	30.441	177.392	—	—	—	—
42	74	Mike Harmon	Mike Harmon Racing	Dodge	31.331	172.353	—	—	—	—
WD	89	Morgan Shepherd	Shepherd Racing Ventures	Chevrolet	—	—	—	—	—	—
Official qualifying results
Official starting lineup

== Race results ==
Stage 1 Laps: 45

Pos	#	Driver	Team	Make	Pts
1	20	Erik Jones (i)	Joe Gibbs Racing	Toyota	0
2	22	Ryan Blaney (i)	Team Penske	Ford	0
3	12	Joey Logano (i)	Team Penske	Ford	0
4	9	William Byron (R)	JR Motorsports	Chevrolet	7
5	16	Ryan Reed	Roush Fenway Racing	Ford	6
6	18	Daniel Suárez (i)	Joe Gibbs Racing	Toyota	0
7	6	Bubba Wallace	Roush Fenway Racing	Ford	4
8	42	Tyler Reddick	Chip Ganassi Racing	Chevrolet	3
9	2	Austin Dillon (i)	Richard Childress Racing	Chevrolet	0
10	41	Kevin Harvick (i)	Stewart–Haas Racing	Ford	0

Stage 2 Laps: 45

Pos	#	Driver	Team	Make	Pts
1	9	William Byron (R)	JR Motorsports	Chevrolet	10
2	1	Elliott Sadler	JR Motorsports	Chevrolet	9
3	16	Ryan Reed	Roush Fenway Racing	Ford	8
4	23	Spencer Gallagher (R)	GMS Racing	Chevrolet	7
5	33	Brandon Jones	Richard Childress Racing	Chevrolet	6
6	20	Erik Jones (i)	Joe Gibbs Racing	Toyota	0
7	39	Ryan Sieg	RSS Racing	Chevrolet	4
8	11	Blake Koch	Kaulig Racing	Chevrolet	3
9	62	Brendan Gaughan	Richard Childress Racing	Chevrolet	2
10	6	Bubba Wallace	Roush Fenway Racing	Ford	1

Stage 3 Laps: 110

Pos	#	Driver	Team	Make	Laps	Led	Status	Pts
1	20	Erik Jones (i)	Joe Gibbs Racing	Toyota	200	112	running	0
2	22	Ryan Blaney (i)	Team Penske	Ford	200	43	running	0
3	41	Kevin Harvick (i)	Stewart–Haas Racing	Ford	200	0	running	0
4	2	Austin Dillon (i)	Richard Childress Racing	Chevrolet	200	0	running	0
5	00	Cole Custer (R)	Stewart–Haas Racing	Ford	200	0	running	32
6	6	Bubba Wallace	Roush Fenway Racing	Ford	200	1	running	36
7	9	William Byron (R)	JR Motorsports	Chevrolet	200	17	running	47
8	3	Ty Dillon (i)	Richard Childress Racing	Chevrolet	200	0	running	0
9	19	Matt Tifft (R)	Joe Gibbs Racing	Toyota	200	0	running	28
10	1	Elliott Sadler	JR Motorsports	Chevrolet	199	0	running	36
11	16	Ryan Reed	Roush Fenway Racing	Ford	199	0	running	40
12	18	Daniel Suárez (i)	Joe Gibbs Racing	Toyota	199	3	running	0
13	7	Justin Allgaier	JR Motorsports	Chevrolet	199	0	running	31
14	23	Spencer Gallagher (R)	GMS Racing	Chevrolet	199	0	running	23
15	33	Brandon Jones	Richard Childress Racing	Chevrolet	199	5	running	28
16	11	Blake Koch	Kaulig Racing	Chevrolet	198	0	running	24
17	28	Dakoda Armstrong	JGL Racing	Toyota	198	0	running	20
18	39	Ryan Sieg	RSS Racing	Chevrolet	198	0	running	23
19	62	Brendan Gaughan	Richard Childress Racing	Chevrolet	198	0	running	20
20	5	Michael Annett	JR Motorsports	Chevrolet	197	0	running	17
21	51	Jeremy Clements	Jeremy Clements Racing	Chevrolet	197	0	running	16
22	14	J. J. Yeley	TriStar Motorsports	Toyota	197	0	running	15
23	4	Ross Chastain	JD Motorsports	Chevrolet	197	0	running	14
24	99	David Starr	BJMM with SS-Green Light Racing	Chevrolet	196	0	running	13
25	07	Ray Black Jr.	SS-Green Light Racing	Chevrolet	195	0	running	12
26	52	Joey Gase	Jimmy Means Racing	Chevrolet	195	0	running	11
27	78	B. J. McLeod	B. J. McLeod Motorsports	Chevrolet	194	0	running	10
28	90	Alex Labbé	King Autosport	Chevrolet	194	0	running	9
29	24	Jeb Burton	JGL Racing	Toyota	192	0	running	8
30	0	Garrett Smithley	JD Motorsports	Chevrolet	188	0	running	7
31	40	Timmy Hill	MBM Motorsports	Chevrolet	179	0	running	6
32	21	Daniel Hemric (R)	Richard Childress Racing	Chevrolet	172	0	running	5
33	42	Tyler Reddick	Chip Ganassi Racing	Chevrolet	148	0	running	7
34	12	Joey Logano (i)	Team Penske	Ford	145	19	engine	0
35	01	Harrison Rhodes	JD Motorsports	Chevrolet	137	0	clutch	2
36	8	Jeff Green	B. J. McLeod Motorsports	Chevrolet	114	0	suspension	1
37	48	Brennan Poole	Chip Ganassi Racing	Chevrolet	66	0	crash	1
38	98	Casey Mears	Biagi–DenBeste Racing	Ford	50	0	rear gear	1
39	13	Carl Long	MBM Motorsports	Toyota	24	0	steering	1
40	93	Jordan Anderson (i)	RSS Racing	Chevrolet	17	0	electrical	0
Failed to qualify or withdrew
41	97	Stephen Leicht	Obaika Racing	Chevrolet				
42	74	Mike Harmon	Mike Harmon Racing	Dodge				
WD	89	Morgan Shepherd	Shepherd Racing Ventures	Chevrolet				
Official race results

== Standings after the race ==
Drivers' Championship standings

Pos	Driver	Points
1	Elliott Sadler	225
2	William Byron	219 (–6)
3	Ryan Reed	183 (–42)
4	Bubba Wallace	176 (–49)
5	Justin Allgaier	174 (–51)
6	Matt Tifft	139 (–86)
7	Daniel Hemric	136 (–89)
8	Brennan Poole	134 (–91)
9	Michael Annett	130 (–95)
10	Blake Koch	130 (–95)
11	Dakoda Armstrong	121 (–104)
12	Cole Custer	118 (–107)
Official driver's standings

- Note: Only the first 12 positions are included for the driver standings.

Previous race: 2017 Service King 300	NASCAR Xfinity Series; 2017 season	Next race: 2017 Fitzgerald Glider Kits 300
