= 2017 Use Your Melon. Drive Sober 200 =

28th race of the 2017 NASCAR Xfinity Series

Race details
- Race 28 of 33 in the 2017 NASCAR Xfinity Series
- Date: September 30, 2017
- Official name: 32nd Annual Use Your Melon. Drive Sober 200
- Location: Dover, Delaware, Dover International Speedway
- Course: Permanent racing facility
- Course length: 1 miles (1.6 km)
- Distance: 200 laps, 200 mi (321.868 km)
- Scheduled distance: 200 laps, 200 mi (321.868 km)
- Average speed: 111.975 miles per hour (180.206 km/h)

Pole position
Driver	William Byron	JR Motorsports
- Time: 23.046

Most laps led
Driver	Ryan Blaney	Team Penske
- Laps: 136

Winner
No. 22	Ryan Blaney	Team Penske

Television in the United States
- Network: NBCSN
- Announcers: Rick Allen, Jeff Burton, Steve Letarte

Radio in the United States
- Radio: Motor Racing Network

The 2017 Use Your Melon. Drive Sober 200 was the 28th stock car race of the 2017 NASCAR Xfinity Series season, the second race of the Round of 12, and the 32nd iteration of the event. The race was held on Saturday, September 30, 2017, in Dover, Delaware at Dover International Speedway, a 1 mile (1.6 km) permanent oval-shaped racetrack. The race took the scheduled 200 laps to complete. At race's end, Ryan Blaney, driving for Team Penske, would dominate for most of the race to win his sixth career NASCAR Xfinity Series victory and his second and final victory of the season. To fill out the podium, Justin Allgaier and William Byron, both driving for JR Motorsports, would finish second and third, respectively.

== Entry list ==
- (R) denotes rookie driver.
- (i) denotes driver who is ineligible for series driver points.

#	Driver	Team	Make
0	Garrett Smithley	JD Motorsports	Chevrolet
00	Cole Custer (R)	Stewart–Haas Racing	Ford
1	Elliott Sadler	JR Motorsports	Chevrolet
01	Harrison Rhodes	JD Motorsports	Chevrolet
2	Austin Dillon (i)	Richard Childress Racing	Chevrolet
3	Ty Dillon (i)	Richard Childress Racing	Chevrolet
4	Ross Chastain	JD Motorsports	Chevrolet
5	Michael Annett	JR Motorsports	Chevrolet
7	Justin Allgaier	JR Motorsports	Chevrolet
07	Ray Black Jr.	SS-Green Light Racing	Chevrolet
8	B. J. McLeod	B. J. McLeod Motorsports	Chevrolet
9	William Byron (R)	JR Motorsports	Chevrolet
11	Blake Koch	Kaulig Racing	Chevrolet
13	Timmy Hill	MBM Motorsports	Chevrolet
14	J. J. Yeley	TriStar Motorsports	Toyota
15	Reed Sorenson (i)	JD Motorsports	Chevrolet
16	Ryan Reed	Roush Fenway Racing	Ford
18	Daniel Suárez (i)	Joe Gibbs Racing	Toyota
19	Matt Tifft (R)	Joe Gibbs Racing	Toyota
20	Erik Jones (i)	Joe Gibbs Racing	Toyota
21	Daniel Hemric (R)	Richard Childress Racing	Chevrolet
22	Ryan Blaney (i)	Team Penske	Ford
23	Spencer Gallagher (R)	GMS Racing	Chevrolet
24	Corey LaJoie (i)	JGL Racing	Toyota
33	Brandon Jones	Richard Childress Racing	Chevrolet
38	Gray Gaulding (i)	RSS Racing	Chevrolet
39	Ryan Sieg	RSS Racing	Chevrolet
40	Chad Finchum	MBM Motorsports	Chevrolet
42	Tyler Reddick	Chip Ganassi Racing	Chevrolet
48	Brennan Poole	Chip Ganassi Racing	Chevrolet
51	Jeremy Clements	Jeremy Clements Racing	Chevrolet
52	Joey Gase	Jimmy Means Racing	Chevrolet
62	Brendan Gaughan	Richard Childress Racing	Chevrolet
74	Mike Harmon	Mike Harmon Racing	Dodge
78	Josh Bilicki	B. J. McLeod Motorsports	Chevrolet
89	Morgan Shepherd	Shepherd Racing Ventures	Chevrolet
90	Brandon Brown	Brandonbilt Motorsports	Chevrolet
93	Jeff Green	RSS Racing	Chevrolet
98	Casey Mears	Biagi-DenBeste Racing	Ford
99	David Starr	BJMM with SS-Green Light Racing	Chevrolet
Official entry list

== Practice ==
=== First practice ===
The first practice session was held on Friday, September 29, at 12:00 PM EST. The session would last for 55 minutes. Ryan Blaney, driving for Team Penske, would set the fastest time in the session, with a lap of 23.335 and an average speed of 154.275 mph (248.282 km/h).

Pos	#	Driver	Team	Make	Time	Speed
1	22	Ryan Blaney (i)	Team Penske	Ford	23.335	154.275
2	20	Erik Jones (i)	Joe Gibbs Racing	Toyota	23.357	154.129
3	9	William Byron (R)	JR Motorsports	Chevrolet	23.384	153.951
First practice results

=== Final practice ===
The final practice session, was held on Friday, September 29, at 2:30 PM EST. The session would last for 55 minutes. Ryan Blaney, driving for Team Penske, would set the fastest time in the session, with a lap of 23.580 and an average speed of 152.672 mph (245.702 km/h).

Pos	#	Driver	Team	Make	Time	Speed
1	22	Ryan Blaney (i)	Team Penske	Ford	23.580	152.672
2	9	William Byron (R)	JR Motorsports	Chevrolet	23.581	152.665
3	33	Brandon Jones	Richard Childress Racing	Chevrolet	23.588	152.620
Final practice results

== Qualifying ==
Qualifying was held on Saturday, September 30, at 11:35 AM EST. Since Dover International Speedway is under 2 miles (3.2 km) in length, the qualifying system was a multi-car system that included three rounds. The first round was 15 minutes, where every driver would be able to set a lap within the 15 minutes. Then, the second round would consist of the fastest 24 cars in Round 1, and drivers would have 10 minutes to set a lap. Round 3 consisted of the fastest 12 drivers from Round 2, and the drivers would have 5 minutes to set a time. Whoever was fastest in Round 3 would win the pole.

William Byron, driving for JR Motorsports, would win the pole after setting a time of 23.046 and an average speed of 156.209 mph (251.394 km/h) in the third round.

No drivers would fail to qualify.

=== Full qualifying results ===
Pos	#	Driver	Team	Make	Time (R1)	Speed (R1)	Time (R2)	Speed (R2)	Time (R3)	Speed (R3)
1	9	William Byron (R)	JR Motorsports	Chevrolet	23.074	156.020	23.110	155.777	23.046	156.209
2	18	Daniel Suárez (i)	Joe Gibbs Racing	Toyota	23.154	155.481	23.259	154.779	23.084	155.952
3	20	Erik Jones (i)	Joe Gibbs Racing	Toyota	23.362	154.096	23.294	154.546	23.161	155.434
4	7	Justin Allgaier	JR Motorsports	Chevrolet	23.144	155.548	23.156	155.467	23.170	155.373
5	42	Tyler Reddick	Chip Ganassi Racing	Chevrolet	23.439	153.590	23.330	154.308	23.191	155.233
6	00	Cole Custer (R)	Stewart–Haas Racing	Ford	23.353	154.156	23.235	154.939	23.207	155.126
7	48	Brennan Poole	Chip Ganassi Racing	Chevrolet	23.334	154.281	23.207	155.126	23.239	154.912
8	22	Ryan Blaney (i)	Team Penske	Ford	23.289	154.579	23.346	154.202	23.246	154.865
9	21	Daniel Hemric (R)	Richard Childress Racing	Chevrolet	23.592	152.594	23.337	154.261	23.310	154.440
10	1	Elliott Sadler	JR Motorsports	Chevrolet	23.394	153.886	23.301	154.500	23.379	153.984
11	3	Ty Dillon (i)	Richard Childress Racing	Chevrolet	23.381	153.971	23.318	154.387	23.402	153.833
12	4	Ross Chastain	JD Motorsports	Chevrolet	23.466	153.413	23.347	154.195	23.495	153.224
Eliminated in Round 2
13	62	Brendan Gaughan	Richard Childress Racing	Chevrolet	23.598	152.555	23.392	153.899	-	-
14	24	Corey LaJoie (i)	JGL Racing	Toyota	23.731	151.700	23.457	153.472	-	-
15	33	Brandon Jones	Richard Childress Racing	Chevrolet	23.495	153.224	23.482	153.309	-	-
16	5	Michael Annett	JR Motorsports	Chevrolet	23.578	152.685	23.533	152.977	-	-
17	16	Ryan Reed	Roush Fenway Racing	Ford	23.463	153.433	23.572	152.724	-	-
18	98	Casey Mears	Biagi-DenBeste Racing	Ford	23.594	152.581	23.577	152.691	-	-
19	11	Blake Koch	Kaulig Racing	Chevrolet	23.699	151.905	23.617	152.433	-	-
20	23	Spencer Gallagher (R)	GMS Racing	Chevrolet	23.739	151.649	23.681	152.021	-	-
21	39	Ryan Sieg	RSS Racing	Chevrolet	23.686	151.989	23.762	151.502	-	-
22	51	Jeremy Clements	Jeremy Clements Racing	Chevrolet	23.735	151.675	23.850	150.943	-	-
23	19	Matt Tifft (R)	Joe Gibbs Racing	Toyota	23.442	153.571	-	-	-	-
24	15	Reed Sorenson (i)	JD Motorsports	Chevrolet	23.617	152.433	-	-	-	-
Eliminated in Round 1
25	14	J. J. Yeley	TriStar Motorsports	Toyota	23.777	151.407	-	-	-	-
26	2	Austin Dillon (i)	Richard Childress Racing	Chevrolet	23.791	151.318	-	-	-	-
27	07	Ray Black Jr.	SS-Green Light Racing	Chevrolet	23.895	150.659	-	-	-	-
28	8	B. J. McLeod	B. J. McLeod Motorsports	Chevrolet	23.907	150.584	-	-	-	-
29	90	Brandon Brown	Brandonbilt Motorsports	Chevrolet	23.967	150.207	-	-	-	-
30	0	Garrett Smithley	JD Motorsports	Chevrolet	24.032	149.800	-	-	-	-
31	01	Harrison Rhodes	JD Motorsports	Chevrolet	24.107	149.334	-	-	-	-
32	99	David Starr	BJMM with SS-Green Light Racing	Chevrolet	24.222	148.625	-	-	-	-
33	93	Jeff Green	RSS Racing	Chevrolet	24.266	148.356	-	-	-	-
Qualified by owner's points
34	40	Chad Finchum	MBM Motorsports	Chevrolet	24.429	147.366	-	-	-	-
35	52	Joey Gase	Jimmy Means Racing	Chevrolet	24.505	146.909	-	-	-	-
36	89	Morgan Shepherd	Shepherd Racing Ventures	Chevrolet	25.096	143.449	-	-	-	-
37	74	Mike Harmon	Mike Harmon Racing	Dodge	26.012	138.398	-	-	-	-
38	13	Timmy Hill	MBM Motorsports	Chevrolet	26.214	137.331	-	-	-	-
39	78	Josh Bilicki	B. J. McLeod Motorsports	Chevrolet	-	-	-	-	-	-
Last car to qualify on time
40	38	Gray Gaulding (i)	RSS Racing	Chevrolet	24.850	144.869	-	-	-	-
Official qualifying results
Official starting lineup

== Race results ==
Stage 1 Laps: 60

Pos	#	Driver	Team	Make	Pts
1	9	William Byron (R)	JR Motorsports	Chevrolet	10
2	22	Ryan Blaney (i)	Team Penske	Ford	0
3	18	Daniel Suárez (i)	Joe Gibbs Racing	Toyota	0
4	7	Justin Allgaier	JR Motorsports	Chevrolet	7
5	20	Erik Jones (i)	Joe Gibbs Racing	Toyota	0
6	1	Elliott Sadler	JR Motorsports	Chevrolet	5
7	42	Tyler Reddick	Chip Ganassi Racing	Chevrolet	4
8	00	Cole Custer (R)	Stewart–Haas Racing	Ford	3
9	21	Daniel Hemric (R)	Richard Childress Racing	Chevrolet	2
10	48	Brennan Poole	Chip Ganassi Racing	Chevrolet	1

Stage 2 Laps: 60

Pos	#	Driver	Team	Make	Pts
1	22	Ryan Blaney (i)	Team Penske	Ford	0
2	9	William Byron (R)	JR Motorsports	Chevrolet	9
3	7	Justin Allgaier	JR Motorsports	Chevrolet	8
4	18	Daniel Suárez (i)	Joe Gibbs Racing	Toyota	0
5	1	Elliott Sadler	JR Motorsports	Chevrolet	6
6	42	Tyler Reddick	Chip Ganassi Racing	Chevrolet	5
7	00	Cole Custer (R)	Stewart–Haas Racing	Ford	4
8	21	Daniel Hemric (R)	Richard Childress Racing	Chevrolet	3
9	48	Brennan Poole	Chip Ganassi Racing	Chevrolet	2
10	20	Erik Jones (i)	Joe Gibbs Racing	Toyota	0

Stage 3 Laps: 80

Pos	#	Driver	Team	Make	Laps	Led	Status	Pts
1	22	Ryan Blaney (i)	Team Penske	Ford	200	136	running	0
2	7	Justin Allgaier	JR Motorsports	Chevrolet	200	0	running	50
3	9	William Byron (R)	JR Motorsports	Chevrolet	200	62	running	53
4	21	Daniel Hemric (R)	Richard Childress Racing	Chevrolet	200	0	running	38
5	48	Brennan Poole	Chip Ganassi Racing	Chevrolet	200	0	running	35
6	19	Matt Tifft (R)	Joe Gibbs Racing	Toyota	200	0	running	31
7	18	Daniel Suárez (i)	Joe Gibbs Racing	Toyota	200	2	running	0
8	00	Cole Custer (R)	Stewart–Haas Racing	Ford	200	0	running	36
9	1	Elliott Sadler	JR Motorsports	Chevrolet	200	0	running	39
10	62	Brendan Gaughan	Richard Childress Racing	Chevrolet	200	0	running	27
11	5	Michael Annett	JR Motorsports	Chevrolet	200	0	running	26
12	4	Ross Chastain	JD Motorsports	Chevrolet	200	0	running	25
13	3	Ty Dillon (i)	Richard Childress Racing	Chevrolet	200	0	running	0
14	39	Ryan Sieg	RSS Racing	Chevrolet	199	0	running	23
15	24	Corey LaJoie (i)	JGL Racing	Toyota	199	0	running	0
16	16	Ryan Reed	Roush Fenway Racing	Ford	198	0	running	21
17	14	J. J. Yeley	TriStar Motorsports	Toyota	198	0	running	20
18	98	Casey Mears	Biagi-DenBeste Racing	Ford	198	0	running	19
19	11	Blake Koch	Kaulig Racing	Chevrolet	198	0	running	18
20	20	Erik Jones (i)	Joe Gibbs Racing	Toyota	198	0	running	0
21	07	Ray Black Jr.	SS-Green Light Racing	Chevrolet	198	0	running	16
22	51	Jeremy Clements	Jeremy Clements Racing	Chevrolet	198	0	running	15
23	2	Austin Dillon (i)	Richard Childress Racing	Chevrolet	198	0	running	0
24	23	Spencer Gallagher (R)	GMS Racing	Chevrolet	198	0	running	13
25	90	Brandon Brown	Brandonbilt Motorsports	Chevrolet	197	0	running	12
26	42	Tyler Reddick	Chip Ganassi Racing	Chevrolet	197	0	running	20
27	8	B. J. McLeod	B. J. McLeod Motorsports	Chevrolet	194	0	running	10
28	52	Joey Gase	Jimmy Means Racing	Chevrolet	194	0	running	9
29	0	Garrett Smithley	JD Motorsports	Chevrolet	194	0	running	8
30	78	Josh Bilicki	B. J. McLeod Motorsports	Chevrolet	192	0	running	7
31	74	Mike Harmon	Mike Harmon Racing	Dodge	87	0	clutch	6
32	89	Morgan Shepherd	Shepherd Racing Ventures	Chevrolet	43	0	suspension	5
33	13	Timmy Hill	MBM Motorsports	Chevrolet	35	0	overheating	4
34	38	Gray Gaulding (i)	RSS Racing	Chevrolet	31	0	electrical	0
35	15	Reed Sorenson (i)	JD Motorsports	Chevrolet	25	0	crash	0
36	40	Chad Finchum	MBM Motorsports	Chevrolet	25	0	crash	1
37	01	Harrison Rhodes	JD Motorsports	Chevrolet	17	0	engine	1
38	99	David Starr	BJMM with SS-Green Light Racing	Chevrolet	7	0	crash	1
39	33	Brandon Jones	Richard Childress Racing	Chevrolet	4	0	crash	1
40	93	Jeff Green	RSS Racing	Chevrolet	4	0	crash	1
Official race results

== Standings after the race ==
Drivers' Championship standings

	Pos	Driver	Points
	1	Justin Allgaier	2,107
3	2	William Byron	2,104 (-3)
	3	Elliott Sadler	2,094 (–13)
2	4	Cole Custer	2,093 (–14)
1	5	Daniel Hemric	2,090 (–17)
	6	Brennan Poole	2,082 (-25)
	7	Matt Tifft	2,067 (-40)
	8	Ryan Reed	2,055 (-52)
	9	Brendan Gaughan	2,053 (-54)
1	10	Blake Koch	2,048 (-59)
1	11	Michael Annett	2,043 (-64)
	12	Jeremy Clements	2,035 (-72)
Official driver's standings

- Note: Only the first 12 positions are included for the driver standings.

Previous race: 2017 VisitMyrtleBeach.com 300	NASCAR Xfinity Series; 2017 season	Next race: 2017 Drive for the Cure 300
