= 2017 Lilly Diabetes 250 =

18th race of the 2017 NASCAR Xfinity Series

Race details
- Race 18 of 33 in the 2017 NASCAR Xfinity Series
- Date: July 22, 2017
- Official name: Sixth Annual Lilly Diabetes 250
- Location: Speedway, Indiana, Indianapolis Motor Speedway
- Course: Permanent racing facility
- Course length: 2.500 miles (4.023 km)
- Distance: 100 laps, 250 mi (402.336 km)
- Scheduled distance: 100 laps, 250 mi (402.336 km)
- Average speed: 126.227 miles per hour (203.143 km/h)

Pole position
Driver	Elliott Sadler	JR Motorsports
- Time: 54.452

Most laps led
Driver	Kyle Busch	Joe Gibbs Racing
- Laps: 44

Winner
No. 9	William Byron	JR Motorsports

Television in the United States
- Network: NBCSN
- Announcers: Rick Allen, Dale Jarrett, Jeff Burton, Steve Letarte

Radio in the United States
- Radio: Motor Racing Network

The 2017 Lilly Diabetes 250 was the 18th stock car race of the 2017 NASCAR Xfinity Series season and the sixth iteration of the event. The race was held on Saturday, July 22, 2017, in Speedway, Indiana, at Indianapolis Motor Speedway a 2.500 miles (4.023 km) permanent, rectangular-shaped, low-banked racetrack. The race took the scheduled 100 laps to complete. In an exciting battle with 5 laps to go, William Byron, driving for JR Motorsports, held off a charging Paul Menard for his third career NASCAR Xfinity Series win. To fill out the podium, Joey Logano of Team Penske would finish third, respectively.

== Entry list ==
- (R) denotes rookie driver.
- (i) denotes driver who is ineligible for series driver points.

#	Driver	Team	Make
00	Cole Custer (R)	Stewart–Haas Racing	Ford
0	Garrett Smithley	JD Motorsports	Chevrolet
01	Harrison Rhodes	JD Motorsports	Chevrolet
1	Elliott Sadler	JR Motorsports	Chevrolet
2	Paul Menard (i)	Richard Childress Racing	Chevrolet
3	Ty Dillon (i)	Richard Childress Racing	Chevrolet
4	Ross Chastain	JD Motorsports	Chevrolet
5	Michael Annett	JR Motorsports	Chevrolet
07	Ray Black Jr.	SS-Green Light Racing	Chevrolet
7	Justin Allgaier	JR Motorsports	Chevrolet
8	B. J. McLeod	B. J. McLeod Motorsports	Chevrolet
9	William Byron (R)	JR Motorsports	Chevrolet
11	Blake Koch	Kaulig Racing	Chevrolet
13	Timmy Hill	MBM Motorsports	Toyota
14	J. J. Yeley	TriStar Motorsports	Toyota
15	Reed Sorenson (i)	JD Motorsports	Chevrolet
16	Ryan Reed	Roush Fenway Racing	Ford
18	Kyle Busch (i)	Joe Gibbs Racing	Toyota
19	Matt Tifft (R)	Joe Gibbs Racing	Toyota
20	Erik Jones (i)	Joe Gibbs Racing	Toyota
21	Daniel Hemric (R)	Richard Childress Racing	Chevrolet
22	Joey Logano (i)	Team Penske	Ford
23	Spencer Gallagher (R)	GMS Racing	Chevrolet
24	Jeb Burton	JGL Racing	Toyota
28	Dakoda Armstrong	JGL Racing	Toyota
33	Brandon Jones	Richard Childress Racing	Chevrolet
39	Ryan Sieg	RSS Racing	Chevrolet
40	Chad Finchum	MBM Motorsports	Dodge
42	Tyler Reddick	Chip Ganassi Racing	Chevrolet
48	Brennan Poole	Chip Ganassi Racing	Chevrolet
51	Jeremy Clements	Jeremy Clements Racing	Chevrolet
52	Joey Gase	Jimmy Means Racing	Chevrolet
62	Brendan Gaughan	Richard Childress Racing	Chevrolet
74	Mike Harmon	Mike Harmon Racing	Dodge
78	Tommy Joe Martins	B. J. McLeod Motorsports	Chevrolet
89	Morgan Shepherd	Shepherd Racing Ventures	Chevrolet
90	Mario Gosselin	King Autosport	Chevrolet
93	Jeff Green	RSS Racing	Chevrolet
96	Ben Kennedy (R)	GMS Racing	Chevrolet
99	David Starr	BJMM with SS-Green Light Racing	Chevrolet
Official entry list

== Practice ==
=== First practice ===
The first practice session was held on Friday, July 21, at 1:00 PM EST. The session would last for 55 minutes. Elliott Sadler of JR Motorsports would set the fastest time in the session, with a lap of 54.080 and an average speed of 166.420 mph (267.827 km/h).

Pos	#	Driver	Team	Make	Time	Speed
1	1	Elliott Sadler	JR Motorsports	Chevrolet	54.080	166.420
2	7	Justin Allgaier	JR Motorsports	Chevrolet	54.148	166.211
3	18	Kyle Busch (i)	Joe Gibbs Racing	Toyota	54.279	165.810
Full first practice results

=== Final practice ===
The final practice session was held on Friday, July 21, at 3:00 PM EST. The session would last for 55 minutes. Justin Allgaier of JR Motorsports would set the fastest time in the session, with a lap of 54.059 and an average speed of 166.485 mph (267.932 km/h).

Pos	#	Driver	Team	Make	Time	Speed
1	7	Justin Allgaier	JR Motorsports	Chevrolet	54.059	166.485
2	19	Matt Tifft (R)	Joe Gibbs Racing	Toyota	54.122	166.291
3	18	Kyle Busch (i)	Joe Gibbs Racing	Toyota	54.164	166.162
Full final practice results

== Qualifying ==
Qualifying was held on Saturday, July 22, at 12:45 PM EST. Since Indianapolis Motor Speedway is at least 2 miles (3.2 km), the qualifying system was a single car, single lap, two round system where in the first round, everyone would set a time to determine positions 13–40. Then, the fastest 12 qualifiers would move on to the second round to determine positions 1–12.

Elliott Sadler of JR Motorsports won the pole with a lap of 54.452 and an average speed of 165.283 mph (265.997 km/h).

=== Full qualifying results ===
Pos	#	Driver	Team	Make	Time (R1)	Speed (R1)	Time (R2)	Speed (R2)
1	1	Elliott Sadler	JR Motorsports	Chevrolet	54.625	164.760	54.452	165.283
2	20	Erik Jones (i)	Joe Gibbs Racing	Toyota	54.516	165.089	54.456	165.271
3	9	William Byron (R)	JR Motorsports	Chevrolet	54.863	164.045	54.687	164.573
4	7	Justin Allgaier	JR Motorsports	Chevrolet	54.955	163.770	54.744	164.402
5	5	Michael Annett	JR Motorsports	Chevrolet	54.887	163.973	54.792	164.258
6	00	Cole Custer (R)	Stewart–Haas Racing	Ford	54.914	163.893	54.793	164.255
7	19	Matt Tifft (R)	Joe Gibbs Racing	Toyota	55.011	163.604	54.838	164.120
8	39	Ryan Sieg	RSS Racing	Chevrolet	54.957	163.764	54.920	163.875
9	96	Ben Kennedy (R)	GMS Racing	Chevrolet	55.010	163.607	54.971	163.723
10	16	Ryan Reed	Roush Fenway Racing	Ford	54.985	163.681	54.977	163.705
11	18	Kyle Busch (i)	Joe Gibbs Racing	Toyota	54.901	163.931	55.009	163.610
12	22	Joey Logano (i)	Team Penske	Ford	55.031	163.544	55.117	162.289
Eliminated in Round 1
13	21	Daniel Hemric (R)	Richard Childress Racing	Chevrolet	55.070	163.428	-	-
14	33	Brandon Jones	Richard Childress Racing	Chevrolet	55.088	163.375	-	-
15	2	Paul Menard (i)	Richard Childress Racing	Chevrolet	55.182	163.097	-	-
16	62	Brendan Gaughan	Richard Childress Racing	Chevrolet	55.310	162.719	-	-
17	48	Brennan Poole	Chip Ganassi Racing	Chevrolet	55.328	162.666	-	-
18	42	Tyler Reddick	Chip Ganassi Racing	Chevrolet	55.369	162.546	-	-
19	3	Ty Dillon (i)	Richard Childress Racing	Chevrolet	55.396	162.467	-	-
20	23	Spencer Gallagher (R)	GMS Racing	Chevrolet	55.476	162.232	-	-
21	14	J. J. Yeley	TriStar Motorsports	Toyota	55.558	161.993	-	-
22	11	Blake Koch	Kaulig Racing	Chevrolet	55.694	161.597	-	-
23	4	Bayley Currey	JD Motorsports	Chevrolet	55.732	161.487	-	-
24	28	Dakoda Armstrong	JGL Racing	Toyota	55.777	161.357	-	-
25	24	Jeb Burton	JGL Racing	Toyota	55.792	161.313	-	-
26	90	Mario Gosselin	King Autosport	Chevrolet	55.987	160.752	-	-
27	15	Reed Sorenson (i)	JD Motorsports	Chevrolet	56.025	160.643	-	-
28	93	Jeff Green	RSS Racing	Chevrolet	56.164	160.245	-	-
29	01	Harrison Rhodes	JD Motorsports	Chevrolet	56.166	160.239	-	-
30	07	Ray Black Jr.	SS-Green Light Racing	Chevrolet	56.214	160.102	-	-
31	78	Tommy Joe Martins	B. J. McLeod Motorsports	Chevrolet	56.341	159.742	-	-
32	51	Jeremy Clements	Jeremy Clements Racing	Chevrolet	56.557	159.131	-	-
33	0	Garrett Smithley	JD Motorsports	Chevrolet	56.960	158.006	-	-
Qualified by owner's points
34	8	B. J. McLeod	B. J. McLeod Motorsports	Chevrolet	56.972	157.972	-	-
35	99	David Starr	BJMM with SS-Green Light Racing	Chevrolet	57.353	156.923	-	-
36	13	Timmy Hill	MBM Motorsports	Toyota	57.468	156.609	-	-
37	52	Joey Gase	Jimmy Means Racing	Chevrolet	57.487	156.557	-	-
38	89	Morgan Shepherd	Shepherd Racing Ventures	Chevrolet	58.150	154.772	-	-
39	40	Chad Finchum	MBM Motorsports	Dodge	58.219	154.589	-	-
Qualified by time
40	74	Mike Harmon	Mike Harmon Racing	Dodge	58.396	154.120	-	-
Official qualifying results
Official starting lineup

== Race results ==
Stage 1 Laps: 30

Pos	#	Driver	Team	Make	Pts
1	9	William Byron (R)	JR Motorsports	Chevrolet	10
2	18	Kyle Busch (i)	Joe Gibbs Racing	Toyota	0
3	22	Joey Logano (i)	Team Penske	Ford	0
4	00	Cole Custer (R)	Stewart–Haas Racing	Ford	7
5	48	Brennan Poole	Chip Ganassi Racing	Chevrolet	6
6	3	Ty Dillon (i)	Richard Childress Racing	Chevrolet	0
7	42	Tyler Reddick	Chip Ganassi Racing	Chevrolet	4
8	2	Paul Menard (i)	Richard Childress Racing	Chevrolet	0
9	1	Elliott Sadler	JR Motorsports	Chevrolet	2
10	19	Matt Tifft (R)	Joe Gibbs Racing	Toyota	1

Stage 2 Laps: 30

Pos	#	Driver	Team	Make	Pts
1	1	Elliott Sadler	JR Motorsports	Chevrolet	10
2	48	Brennan Poole	Chip Ganassi Racing	Chevrolet	9
3	21	Daniel Hemric (R)	Richard Childress Racing	Chevrolet	8
4	62	Brendan Gaughan	Richard Childress Racing	Chevrolet	7
5	33	Brandon Jones	Richard Childress Racing	Chevrolet	6
6	4	Ross Chastain	JD Motorsports	Chevrolet	5
7	96	Ben Kennedy (R)	GMS Racing	Chevrolet	4
8	14	J. J. Yeley	TriStar Motorsports	Toyota	3
9	39	Ryan Sieg	RSS Racing	Chevrolet	2
10	51	Jeremy Clements	Jeremy Clements Racing	Chevrolet	1

Stage 3 Laps: 40

Pos	#	Driver	Team	Make	Laps	Led	Status	Pts
1	9	William Byron (R)	JR Motorsports	Chevrolet	100	26	Running	50
2	2	Paul Menard (i)	Richard Childress Racing	Chevrolet	100	0	Running	0
3	22	Joey Logano (i)	Team Penske	Ford	100	0	Running	0
4	1	Elliott Sadler	JR Motorsports	Chevrolet	100	22	Running	45
5	00	Cole Custer (R)	Stewart–Haas Racing	Ford	100	0	Running	39
6	16	Ryan Reed	Roush Fenway Racing	Ford	100	0	Running	31
7	48	Brennan Poole	Chip Ganassi Racing	Chevrolet	100	0	Running	45
8	21	Daniel Hemric (R)	Richard Childress Racing	Chevrolet	100	1	Running	37
9	33	Brandon Jones	Richard Childress Racing	Chevrolet	100	0	Running	34
10	3	Ty Dillon (i)	Richard Childress Racing	Chevrolet	100	0	Running	0
11	19	Matt Tifft (R)	Joe Gibbs Racing	Toyota	100	0	Running	27
12	18	Kyle Busch (i)	Joe Gibbs Racing	Toyota	100	44	Running	0
13	62	Brendan Gaughan	Richard Childress Racing	Chevrolet	100	0	Running	31
14	39	Ryan Sieg	RSS Racing	Chevrolet	100	0	Running	25
15	14	J. J. Yeley	TriStar Motorsports	Toyota	100	0	Running	25
16	4	Ross Chastain	JD Motorsports	Chevrolet	100	0	Running	26
17	11	Blake Koch	Kaulig Racing	Chevrolet	100	0	Running	20
18	96	Ben Kennedy (R)	GMS Racing	Chevrolet	100	0	Running	23
19	24	Jeb Burton	JGL Racing	Toyota	100	0	Running	18
20	28	Dakoda Armstrong	JGL Racing	Toyota	99	0	Running	17
21	0	Garrett Smithley	JD Motorsports	Chevrolet	99	1	Running	16
22	01	Harrison Rhodes	JD Motorsports	Chevrolet	99	1	Running	15
23	20	Erik Jones (i)	Joe Gibbs Racing	Toyota	99	0	Running	0
24	07	Ray Black Jr.	SS-Green Light Racing	Chevrolet	99	0	Running	13
25	5	Michael Annett	JR Motorsports	Chevrolet	99	0	Running	12
26	78	Tommy Joe Martins	B. J. McLeod Motorsports	Chevrolet	99	0	Running	11
27	90	Mario Gosselin	King Autosport	Chevrolet	99	0	Running	10
28	23	Spencer Gallagher (R)	GMS Racing	Chevrolet	99	0	Running	9
29	99	David Starr	BJMM with SS-Green Light Racing	Chevrolet	99	0	Running	8
30	52	Joey Gase	Jimmy Means Racing	Chevrolet	98	0	Running	7
31	51	Jeremy Clements	Jeremy Clements Racing	Chevrolet	98	0	Running	7
32	40	Chad Finchum	MBM Motorsports	Dodge	98	0	Running	5
33	8	B. J. McLeod	B. J. McLeod Motorsports	Chevrolet	93	0	Running	4
34	74	Mike Harmon	Mike Harmon Racing	Dodge	90	0	Transmission	3
35	7	Justin Allgaier	JR Motorsports	Chevrolet	86	4	Running	2
36	13	Timmy Hill	MBM Motorsports	Toyota	40	0	Clutch	1
37	42	Tyler Reddick	Chip Ganassi Racing	Chevrolet	38	0	Accident	5
38	15	Reed Sorenson (i)	JD Motorsports	Chevrolet	23	0	Vibration	0
39	89	Morgan Shepherd	Shepherd Racing Ventures	Chevrolet	22	1	Engine	1
40	93	Jeff Green	RSS Racing	Chevrolet	9	0	Vibration	1
Official race results

== Standings after the race ==
Drivers' Championship standings

Pos	Driver	Points
1	Elliott Sadler	665
2	William Byron	625 (–25)
3	Justin Allgaier	532 (–133)
4	Brennan Poole	473 (–192)
5	Daniel Hemric	458 (–207)
6	Cole Custer	435 (–230)
7	Matt Tifft	414 (–251)
8	Ryan Reed	408 (–257)
9	Dakoda Armstrong	368 (–297)
10	Michael Annett	367 (–298)
11	Blake Koch	324 (–321)
12	Brendan Gaughan	329 (–336)
Official driver's standings

- Note: Only the first 12 positions are included for the driver standings.

Previous race: 2017 Overton's 200	NASCAR Xfinity Series; 2017 season	Next race: 2017 U.S. Cellular 250
