= 2017 Food City 300 =

22nd race of the 2017 NASCAR Xfinity Series

Race details
- Race 22 of 33 in the 2017 NASCAR Xfinity Series
- Date: August 18, 2017
- Official name: 36th Annual Food City 300
- Location: Bristol, Tennessee, Bristol Motor Speedway
- Course: Permanent racing facility
- Course length: 0.533 miles (0.858 km)
- Distance: 300 laps, 159.9 mi (257.3 km)
- Scheduled distance: 300 laps, 159.9 mi (257.3 km)
- Average speed: 64.154 mph (103.246 km/h)

Pole position
Driver	Kyle Busch	Joe Gibbs Racing
- Time: 15.090

Most laps led
Driver	Kyle Busch	Joe Gibbs Racing
- Laps: 186

Winner
No. 18	Kyle Busch	Joe Gibbs Racing

Television in the United States
- Network: NBCSN
- Announcers: Rick Allen, Jeff Burton, Steve Letarte

Radio in the United States
- Radio: Performance Racing Network

The 2017 Food City 300 was the 22nd stock car race of the 2017 NASCAR Xfinity Series season and the 36th iteration of the event. The race was held on Friday, August 18, 2017, in Bristol, Tennessee at Bristol Motor Speedway, a 0.533 miles (0.858 km) permanent oval-shaped racetrack. The race took the scheduled 300 laps to complete. At race's end, Kyle Busch, driving for Joe Gibbs Racing, put on a dominating performance, leading 186 laps for his 91st career NASCAR Xfinity Series win, and his fifth of the season. To fill out the podium, Daniel Suárez, driving for Joe Gibbs Racing, and Elliott Sadler, driving for JR Motorsports, would finish second and third, respectively.

== Entry list ==
- (R) denotes rookie driver.
- (i) denotes driver who is ineligible for series driver points.

#	Driver	Team	Make
00	Cole Custer (R)	Stewart–Haas Racing	Ford
0	Garrett Smithley	JD Motorsports	Chevrolet
01	Harrison Rhodes	JD Motorsports	Chevrolet
1	Elliott Sadler	JR Motorsports	Chevrolet
2	Austin Dillon (i)	Richard Childress Racing	Chevrolet
3	Ty Dillon (i)	Richard Childress Racing	Chevrolet
4	Ross Chastain	JD Motorsports	Chevrolet
5	Michael Annett	JR Motorsports	Chevrolet
07	Ray Black Jr.	SS-Green Light Racing	Chevrolet
7	Justin Allgaier	JR Motorsports	Chevrolet
8	B. J. McLeod	B. J. McLeod Motorsports	Chevrolet
9	William Byron (R)	JR Motorsports	Chevrolet
11	Blake Koch	Kaulig Racing	Chevrolet
13	Timmy Hill	MBM Motorsports	Dodge
14	J. J. Yeley	TriStar Motorsports	Toyota
15	Reed Sorenson (i)	JD Motorsports	Chevrolet
16	Ryan Reed	Roush Fenway Racing	Ford
18	Kyle Busch (i)	Joe Gibbs Racing	Toyota
19	Matt Tifft (R)	Joe Gibbs Racing	Toyota
20	Daniel Suárez (i)	Joe Gibbs Racing	Toyota
21	Daniel Hemric (R)	Richard Childress Racing	Chevrolet
22	Joey Logano (i)	Team Penske	Ford
23	Spencer Gallagher (R)	GMS Racing	Chevrolet
24	Jeb Burton	JGL Racing	Toyota
28	Dakoda Armstrong	JGL Racing	Toyota
33	Brandon Jones	Richard Childress Racing	Chevrolet
39	Ryan Sieg	RSS Racing	Chevrolet
40	Chad Finchum	MBM Motorsports	Chevrolet
42	Tyler Reddick	Chip Ganassi Racing	Chevrolet
48	Brennan Poole	Chip Ganassi Racing	Chevrolet
51	Jeremy Clements	Jeremy Clements Racing	Chevrolet
52	Joey Gase	Jimmy Means Racing	Chevrolet
62	Brendan Gaughan	Richard Childress Racing	Chevrolet
74	Mike Harmon	Mike Harmon Racing	Dodge
78	Tommy Joe Martins	B. J. McLeod Motorsports	Chevrolet
88	Dale Earnhardt Jr. (i)	JR Motorsports	Chevrolet
89	Morgan Shepherd	Shepherd Racing Ventures	Chevrolet
90	Brandon Brown	Brandonbilt Motorsports	Chevrolet
93	Jeff Green	RSS Racing	Chevrolet
96	Ben Kennedy (R)	GMS Racing	Chevrolet
98	Aric Almirola (i)	Biagi–DenBeste Racing	Ford
99	David Starr	B. J. McLeod Motorsports with SS-Green Light Racing	Chevrolet
Official entry list

== Practice ==
=== First practice ===
The first 55-minute practice session was held on Thursday, August 17, at 1:00 PM EST. Justin Allgaier, driving for JR Motorsports, would set the fastest time in the session, with a lap of 15.306 and an average speed of 125.363 mph (201.752 km/h).

Pos.	#	Driver	Team	Make	Time	Speed
1	7	Justin Allgaier	JR Motorsports	Chevrolet	15.306	125.363
2	18	Kyle Busch (i)	Joe Gibbs Racing	Toyota	15.334	125.134
3	11	Blake Koch	Kaulig Racing	Chevrolet	15.396	124.630
Full first practice results

=== Final practice ===
The final 55-minute practice session was held on Thursday, August 17, at 3:00 PM CST. Kyle Busch, driving for Joe Gibbs Racing, would set the fastest time in the session, with a lap of 15.435 and an average speed of 124.315 mph (200.066 km/h).

Pos.	#	Driver	Team	Make	Time	Speed
1	18	Kyle Busch (i)	Joe Gibbs Racing	Toyota	15.435	124.315
2	22	Joey Logano (i)	Team Penske	Ford	15.491	123.865
3	48	Brennan Poole	Chip Ganassi Racing	Chevrolet	15.526	123.586
Full final practice results

== Qualifying ==
Qualifying was held on Friday, August 18, at 3:40 PM EST. Since Bristol Motor Speedway is under 2 miles (3.2 km), the qualifying system was a multi-car system that included three rounds. The first round was 15 minutes, where every driver would be able to set a lap within the 15 minutes. Then, the second round would consist of the fastest 24 cars in Round 1, and drivers would have 10 minutes to set a lap. Round 3 consisted of the fastest 12 drivers from Round 2, and the drivers would have 5 minutes to set a time. Whoever was fastest in Round 3 would win the pole.

Due to a delayed start because of inclement weather, qualifying would only be one 20-minute session. Kyle Busch, driving for Joe Gibbs Racing, would win the pole, with a lap of 15.090 and an average speed of 127.157 mph (204.639 km/h).

Reed Sorenson and Morgan Shepherd would fail to qualify.

=== Full qualifying results ===
Pos.	#	Driver	Team	Make	Time	Speed
1	18	Kyle Busch (i)	Joe Gibbs Racing	Toyota	15.090	127.157
2	22	Joey Logano (i)	Team Penske	Ford	15.252	125.806
3	48	Brennan Poole	Chip Ganassi Racing	Chevrolet	15.279	125.584
4	7	Justin Allgaier	JR Motorsports	Chevrolet	15.284	125.543
5	00	Cole Custer (R)	Stewart–Haas Racing	Ford	15.293	125.469
6	42	Tyler Reddick	Chip Ganassi Racing	Chevrolet	15.318	125.264
7	20	Daniel Suárez (i)	Joe Gibbs Racing	Toyota	15.335	125.126
8	1	Elliott Sadler	JR Motorsports	Chevrolet	15.359	124.930
9	33	Brandon Jones	Richard Childress Racing	Chevrolet	15.419	124.444
10	62	Brendan Gaughan	Richard Childress Racing	Chevrolet	15.440	124.275
11	2	Austin Dillon (i)	Richard Childress Racing	Chevrolet	15.444	124.242
12	3	Ty Dillon (i)	Richard Childress Racing	Chevrolet	15.485	123.913
13	11	Blake Koch	Kaulig Racing	Chevrolet	15.488	123.889
14	51	Jeremy Clements	Jeremy Clements Racing	Chevrolet	15.501	123.786
15	19	Matt Tifft (R)	Joe Gibbs Racing	Toyota	15.518	123.650
16	21	Daniel Hemric (R)	Richard Childress Racing	Chevrolet	15.520	123.634
17	88	Dale Earnhardt Jr. (i)	JR Motorsports	Chevrolet	15.526	123.586
18	98	Aric Almirola (i)	Biagi-DenBeste Racing	Ford	15.527	123.578
19	9	William Byron (R)	JR Motorsports	Chevrolet	15.533	123.531
20	4	Ross Chastain	JD Motorsports	Chevrolet	15.537	123.499
21	28	Dakoda Armstrong	JGL Racing	Toyota	15.543	123.451
22	24	Jeb Burton	JGL Racing	Toyota	15.568	123.253
23	5	Michael Annett	JR Motorsports	Chevrolet	15.569	123.245
24	96	Ben Kennedy (R)	GMS Racing	Chevrolet	15.611	122.913
25	14	J. J. Yeley	TriStar Motorsports	Toyota	15.633	122.740
26	39	Ryan Sieg	RSS Racing	Chevrolet	15.659	122.537
27	16	Ryan Reed	Roush Fenway Racing	Ford	15.669	122.458
28	8	B. J. McLeod	B. J. McLeod Motorsports	Chevrolet	15.711	122.131
29	23	Spencer Gallagher (R)	GMS Racing	Chevrolet	15.747	121.852
30	01	Harrison Rhodes	JD Motorsports	Chevrolet	15.760	121.751
31	40	Chad Finchum	MBM Motorsports	Chevrolet	15.765	121.713
32	93	Jeff Green	RSS Racing	Chevrolet	15.814	121.336
33	78	Tommy Joe Martins	B. J. McLeod Motorsports	Chevrolet	15.820	121.290
Qualified by owner's points
34	07	Ray Black Jr.	SS-Green Light Racing	Chevrolet	15.958	120.241
35	0	Garrett Smithley	JD Motorsports	Chevrolet	15.960	120.226
36	99	David Starr	BJMM with SS-Green Light Racing	Chevrolet	15.998	119.940
37	13	Timmy Hill	MBM Motorsports	Dodge	16.021	119.768
38	90	Brandon Brown	Brandonbilt Motorsports	Chevrolet	16.068	119.417
39	52	Joey Gase	Jimmy Means Racing	Chevrolet	16.160	118.738
40	74	Mike Harmon	Mike Harmon Racing	Dodge	16.874	113.713
Failed to qualify
41	15	Reed Sorenson (i)	JD Motorsports	Chevrolet	15.854	121.029
42	89	Morgan Shepherd	Shepherd Racing Ventures	Chevrolet	16.280	117.862
Official qualifying results
Official starting lineup

== Race results ==
Stage 1 Laps: 85

Pos.	#	Driver	Team	Make	Pts
1	18	Kyle Busch (i)	Joe Gibbs Racing	Toyota	0
2	7	Justin Allgaier	JR Motorsports	Chevrolet	9
3	22	Joey Logano (i)	Team Penske	Ford	0
4	20	Daniel Suárez (i)	Joe Gibbs Racing	Toyota	0
5	42	Tyler Reddick	Chip Ganassi Racing	Chevrolet	6
6	2	Austin Dillon (i)	Richard Childress Racing	Chevrolet	0
7	48	Brennan Poole	Chip Ganassi Racing	Chevrolet	4
8	1	Elliott Sadler	JR Motorsports	Chevrolet	3
9	88	Dale Earnhardt Jr. (i)	JR Motorsports	Chevrolet	0
10	3	Ty Dillon (i)	Richard Childress Racing	Chevrolet	0

Stage 2 Laps: 85

Pos.	#	Driver	Team	Make	Pts
1	18	Kyle Busch (i)	Joe Gibbs Racing	Toyota	0
2	7	Justin Allgaier	JR Motorsports	Chevrolet	9
3	20	Daniel Suárez (i)	Joe Gibbs Racing	Chevrolet	0
4	1	Elliott Sadler	JR Motorsports	Chevrolet	7
5	2	Austin Dillon (i)	Richard Childress Racing	Chevrolet	0
6	48	Brennan Poole	Chip Ganassi Racing	Chevrolet	5
7	21	Daniel Hemric (R)	Richard Childress Racing	Chevrolet	4
8	42	Tyler Reddick	Chip Ganassi Racing	Chevrolet	3
9	3	Ty Dillon (i)	Richard Childress Racing	Chevrolet	0
10	00	Cole Custer (R)	Stewart–Haas Racing	Ford	1

Stage 3 Laps: 130

Pos	#	Driver	Team	Make	Laps	Led	Status	Pts
1	18	Kyle Busch (i)	Joe Gibbs Racing	Toyota	300	186	Running	0
2	20	Daniel Suárez (i)	Joe Gibbs Racing	Toyota	300	24	Running	0
3	1	Elliott Sadler	JR Motorsports	Chevrolet	300	15	Running	44
4	3	Ty Dillon (i)	Richard Childress Racing	Chevrolet	300	0	Running	0
5	7	Justin Allgaier	JR Motorsports	Chevrolet	300	75	Running	50
6	48	Brennan Poole	Chip Ganassi Racing	Chevrolet	300	0	Running	40
7	21	Daniel Hemric (R)	Richard Childress Racing	Chevrolet	300	0	Running	34
8	2	Austin Dillon (i)	Richard Childress Racing	Chevrolet	300	0	Running	0
9	22	Joey Logano (i)	Team Penske	Ford	300	0	Running	0
10	00	Cole Custer (R)	Stewart–Haas Racing	Ford	300	0	Running	28
11	42	Tyler Reddick	Chip Ganassi Racing	Chevrolet	300	0	Running	35
12	5	Michael Annett	JR Motorsports	Chevrolet	300	0	Running	25
13	88	Dale Earnhardt Jr. (i)	JR Motorsports	Chevrolet	299	0	Running	0
14	11	Blake Koch	Kaulig Racing	Chevrolet	299	0	Running	23
15	4	Ross Chastain	JD Motorsports	Chevrolet	299	0	Running	22
16	14	J. J. Yeley	TriStar Motorsports	Toyota	299	0	Running	21
17	19	Matt Tifft (R)	Joe Gibbs Racing	Toyota	298	0	Running	20
18	51	Jeremy Clements	Jeremy Clements Racing	Chevrolet	298	0	Running	19
19	96	Ben Kennedy (R)	GMS Racing	Chevrolet	297	0	Running	18
20	33	Brandon Jones	Richard Childress Racing	Chevrolet	297	0	Running	17
21	07	Ray Black Jr.	SS-Green Light Racing	Chevrolet	297	0	Running	16
22	9	William Byron (R)	JR Motorsports	Chevrolet	297	0	Running	15
23	23	Spencer Gallagher (R)	GMS Racing	Chevrolet	296	0	Running	14
24	28	Dakoda Armstrong	JGL Racing	Toyota	296	0	Running	13
25	90	Brandon Brown	Brandonbilt Motorsports	Chevrolet	294	0	Running	12
26	8	B. J. McLeod	B. J. McLeod Motorsports	Chevrolet	291	0	Running	11
27	52	Joey Gase	Jimmy Means Racing	Chevrolet	290	0	Running	10
28	40	Chad Finchum	MBM Motorsports	Chevrolet	289	0	Running	9
29	24	Jeb Burton	JGL Racing	Toyota	281	0	Accident	8
30	62	Brendan Gaughan	Richard Childress Racing	Chevrolet	278	0	Accident	7
31	01	Harrison Rhodes	JD Motorsports	Chevrolet	239	0	Suspension	6
32	39	Ryan Sieg	RSS Racing	Chevrolet	217	0	Running	5
33	78	Tommy Joe Martins	B. J. McLeod Motorsports	Chevrolet	210	0	Accident	4
34	0	Garrett Smithley	JD Motorsports	Chevrolet	204	0	Running	3
35	74	Mike Harmon	Mike Harmon Racing	Dodge	80	0	Suspension	2
36	13	Timmy Hill	MBM Motorsports	Dodge	56	0	Vibration	1
37	16	Ryan Reed	Roush Fenway Racing	Ford	38	0	Accident	1
38	98	Aric Almirola (i)	Biagi-DenBeste Racing	Ford	25	0	Accident	0
39	93	Jeff Green	RSS Racing	Chevrolet	18	0	Overheating	1
40	99	David Starr	BJMM with SS-Green Light Racing	Chevrolet	11	0	Accident	1
Official race results

== Standings after the race ==
Drivers' Championship standings

Pos	Driver	Points
1	Elliott Sadler	807
2	William Byron	697 (-110)
3	Justin Allgaier	671 (–136)
4	Brennan Poole	621 (–186)
5	Daniel Hemric	601 (–206)
6	Cole Custer	533 (-274)
7	Matt Tifft	514 (-293)
8	Ryan Reed	458 (-349)
9	Blake Koch	454 (-353)
10	Dakoda Armstrong	444 (-363)
11	Michael Annett	435 (-372)
12	Brendan Gaughan	428 (-379)
Official driver's standings

- Note: Only the first 12 positions are included for the driver standings.

Previous race: 2017 Mid-Ohio Challenge	NASCAR Xfinity Series; 2017 season	Next race: 2017 Johnsonville 180
