= JGL Racing =

American auto racing team

- Owners: James Whitener Sr.; Gregg Mixon; Denise Mixon
- Base: Denver, North Carolina
- Series: NASCAR Xfinity Series
- Manufacturer: Ford
- Opened: 2014
- Closed: 2018

Career
- Debut: 2014 DRIVE4COPD 300 (Daytona)
- Latest race: 2018 Pocono Green 250 (Pocono)
- Races competed: 103
- Drivers' Championships: 0
- Race victories: 0
- Pole positions: 0

JGL Racing was an American professional stock car racing team that last competed in the NASCAR Xfinity Series. The team was based in Denver, North Carolina. The team last fielded the No. 24 for Kaz Grala and No. 28 for Dylan Lupton and Tony Mrakovich.

== History ==
Former partners James Whitener and Gregg Mixon of GIC–Mixon Motorsports announced the formation of a new team on January 20, 2014 with James Whitener as the owner and Gregg Mixon as the General Manager. Veteran driver Carl Long served as the team's competition director, with the team operating out of a Statesville race shop. . During its opening season in 2014, JGL Racing used second-hand Dodge Challengers (Dodge left the sport after 2012) purchased from Team Penske and engines also leased from PENSKE, as other teams have done in the Xfinity Series such as Vision Racing. Because of this, the schemes of the 28 and 93 still resembled those of Penske's No. 12 Alliance Truck Parts and No. 22 Discount Tire cars.

The team expanded to three teams in 2015, and switched to Toyota, using engines from an alliance with TriStar Motorsports' PME Engines. The cars are now built and wrapped in JGL Racing's shop. The paint schemes for the 26 and 28 cars were created by the JGL Graphics Shop.

In August 2015 and continuing into 2016, the team began using engines from Joe Gibbs Racing and expanded its operations to Denver, NC with a multi-building campus.

On November 15, 2017, it was announced that JGL would form a partnership with Roush Fenway Racing and move to Ford for 2018. Kaz Grala was announced as the first driver for the new JGL/Ford pairing, while later signing Dylan Lupton and Tony Mrakovich to the No. 28 car. Grala finished 4th in his Xfinity Series debut at Daytona while Lupton finished 27th.

The team would shut down after a 23rd finish with Lupton at Pocono coming on the heels of the release of Kaz Grala after Dover. The financial struggles were medical issues for team owner James Whitener Sr., and the No. 24 assets were sold to FURY Race Cars while the rest of the assets including the shop were sold to JGL Crew Chief Steven Lane where he would form On Point Motorsports.

Whitener died on March 21, 2022, and his cause of death has not been revealed.

== Xfinity Series ==
=== Car No. 24 history ===
For 2015, Eric McClure signed to drive the No. 24 car, which replaced the former No. 93 team. McClure brought longtime sponsors Hefty and Reynolds Wrap from TriStar Motorsports. Jay Guy was initially announced as crew chief; Steven Lane would assume the duty for the season. After 9 races however, McClure and JGL parted ways and he returned to TriStar Motorsports for the rest of the year. McClure took the car number to TriStar, so the No. 24 JGL team was shut down and its crew moved to the No. 26.

The No. 24 car returned as JGL's second team in 2016. On February 12, the team announced the car will be part of the "Young Guns" program, in which a group of upcoming drivers would drive the car. Joe Gibbs Racing development driver Matt Tifft drove the car at the Daytona season opener with sponsorship from ClinicalRM, finishing 21st. Corey LaJoie drove several races in the car beginning at Atlanta. youtheory later signed on to sponsor LaJoie in eight races beginning at Fontana in March. On April 11, 2016, Brandon McReynolds, son of former crew chief and Fox Sports analyst Larry McReynolds, was announced as the driver of the No. 24 car for the Xfinity race at Talladega later that month.

For 2017, Scott Lagasse Jr., Corey LaJoie, Drew Herring, Jeb Burton, Dylan Lupton and Cale Conley shared the ride.

On November 17, 2017, it was announced that Kaz Grala would drive the No. 24 full-time in 2018. JGL Racing announced that it would switch to Ford and have a technical alliance with Roush Fenway Racing as part of the deal.

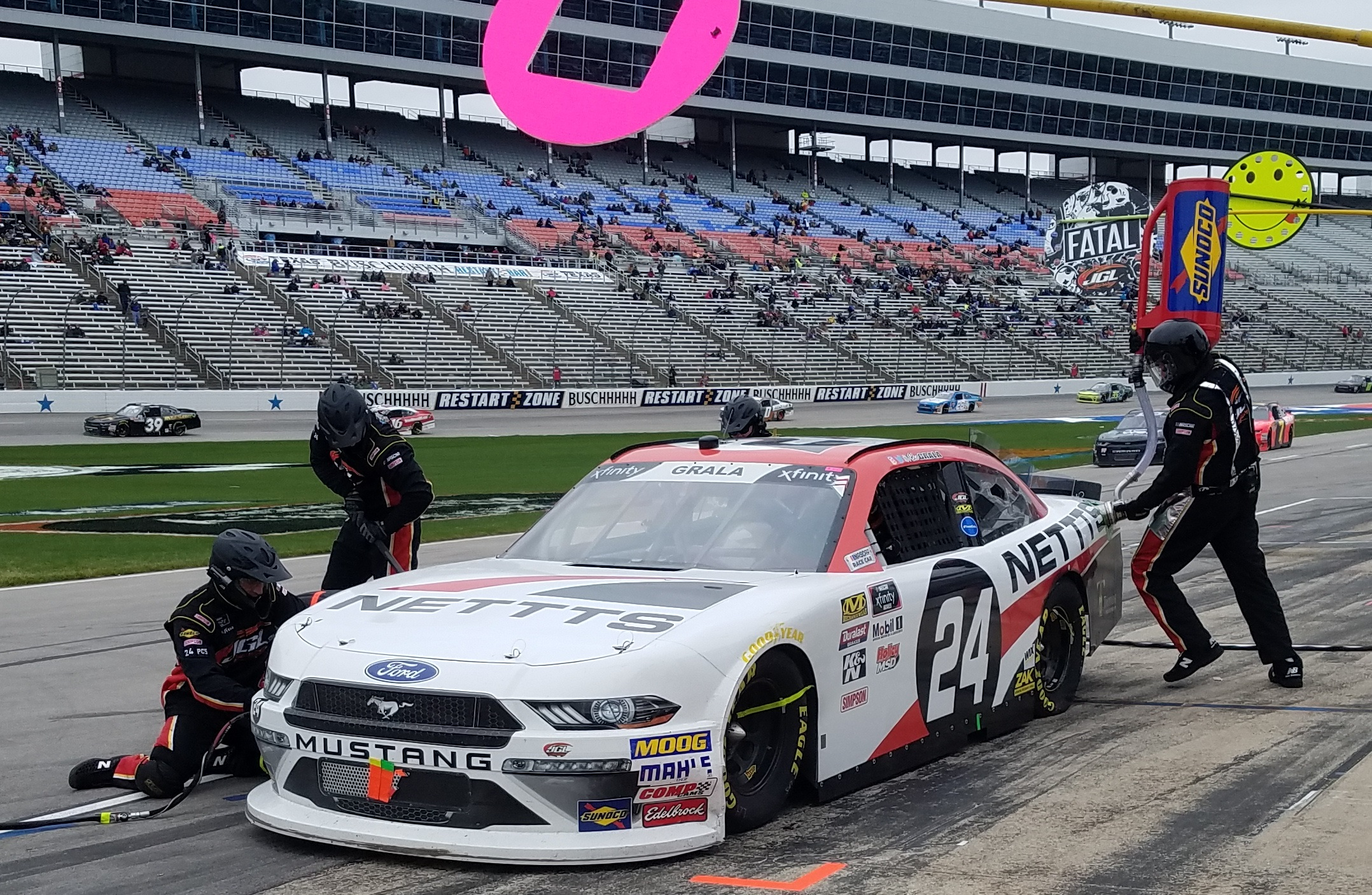
Kaz Grala making a pit stop in the NASCAR Xfinity Series race at Texas in April 2018

However, on May 15, 2018, Grala announced he had been released by JGL as the team was shutting down its No. 24 car due to a lack of sponsorship. Team owner James Whitener later revealed that his diagnosis of liver failure also contributed to the closing of the team. Some of the cars, as well as many of the crew members from the 24 car, including crew chief Shane Wilson, moved to Grala's new team, Fury Race Cars, which is partly owned by his father Darius. The No. 24 was later reassigned to GMS Racing.

==== Car No. 24 results ====
Year	Driver	No.	Make	1	2	3	4	5	6	7	8	9	10	11	12	13	14	15	16	17	18	19	20	21	22	23	24	25	26	27	28	29	30	31	32	33	Owners	Pts
2015	Eric McClure	24	Toyota	DAY; 17	ATL; 28	LVS; 23	PHO; 29	CAL; 34	TEX; 29	BRI; 26	RCH; 36	TAL; 21	IOW	CLT	DOV	MCH	CHI	DAY	KEN	NHA	IND	IOW	GLN	MOH	BRI	ROA	DAR	RCH	CHI	KEN	DOV	CLT	KAN	TEX	PHO	HOM	32nd	457
2016	Matt Tifft	24	Toyota	DAY; 21					TEX; 20	BRI; 23	RCH																										32nd	340
2016	Corey LaJoie	24	Toyota		ATL; 23	LVS; 19		CAL; 18										DAY; 30	KEN	NHA; 37	IND				BRI; 10	ROA	DAR	RCH	CHI	KEN	DOV; 6	CLT	KAN	TEX; 23	PHO; 33	HOM; 35	32nd	340
2016	T. J. Bell	24	Toyota				PHO; 26																														32nd	340
2016	Brandon McReynolds	24	Toyota									TAL; 24										IOW; 32	GLN	MOH													32nd	340
2016	Drew Herring	24	Toyota										DOV; 14	CLT; 18	POC	MCH	IOW; 29																				32nd	340
2017	Scott Lagasse Jr.	24	Toyota	DAY; 6								TAL; 34																									27th	373
2017	Corey LaJoie	24	Toyota		ATL; 16			CAL; 18																							DOV; 15	CLT; 17			PHO; 22	HOM; 15	27th	373
2017	Drew Herring	24	Toyota			LVS; 19	PHO; 20																														27th	373
2017	Jeb Burton	24	Toyota						TEX; 29	BRI; 26								DAY; 4	KEN; 19		IND; 19				BRI; 29												27th	373
2017	Dylan Lupton	24	Toyota								RCH; 12			DOV; 30	POC; 22	MCH; 24	IOW; 15			NHA; 22		IOW; 25	GLN; 20	MOH; 27		ROA; 33	DAR; 30	RCH; 24	CHI	KEN			KAN; 16	TEX; 21			27th	373
2017	Cale Conley	24	Toyota										CLT; 32																								27th	373
2018	Kaz Grala	24	Ford	DAY; 4	ATL; 23	LVS; 16	PHO; 12	CAL; 14	TEX; 26	BRI; 38	RCH; 30	TAL; 20	DOV; 37	CLT	POC	MCH	IOW	CHI	DAY	KEN	NHA	IOW	GLN	MOH	BRI	ROA	DAR	IND	LVS	RCH	CLT	DOV	KAN	TEX	PHO	HOM	41st	98

=== Car No. 26 history ===
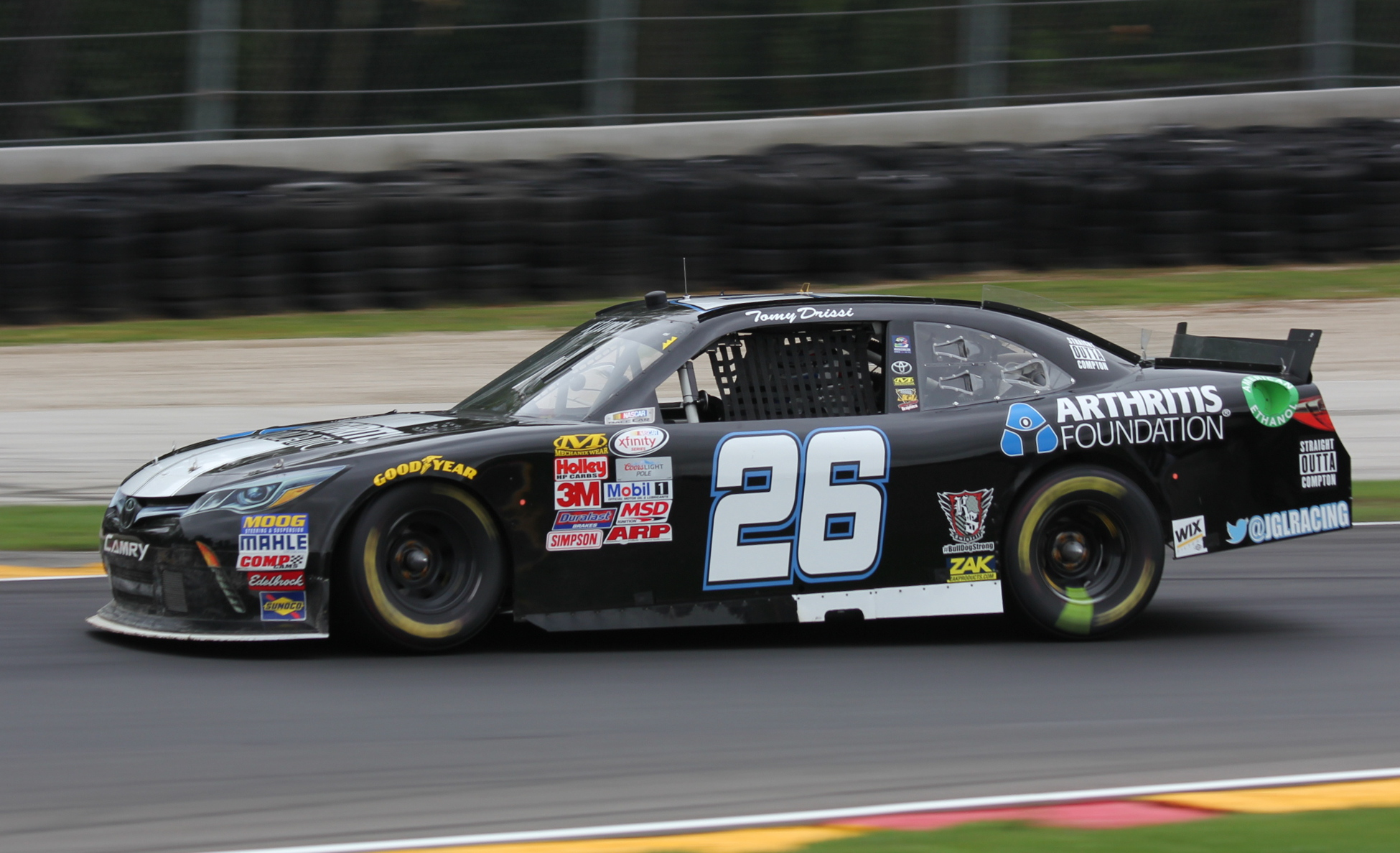
Tomy Drissi at Road America in 2015.

In 2015, Mike Wallace returned to the team in a part-time third entry numbered No. 26. Wallace finished 13th in the season opener at Daytona. Wallace was to again attempt Talladega in this car, but open heart surgery sidelined him, with his replacement being announced as his younger brother Kenny Wallace. The younger Wallace was involved in a multi-car crash, relegating him to a 38th-place finish.

Following the shut down of the No. 24 team after Eric McClure's departure, JGL made the No. 26 a full-time entry, with the No. 26 team assuming the crew from the No. 24 team. Ryan Ellis drove the car at Iowa in May, with C. J. Faison piloting the car at Dover in his series debut. Timmy Hill drove the car at Daytona in July, with Mike Wallace still out of commission following surgery, and Kenny Wallace injured from the Talladega crash and another crash during the season. Tomy Drissi returned to the team at Watkins Glen and Mid-Ohio, promoting the Straight Outta Compton film. Hermie Sadler drove 2 races in the car at Bristol and Richmond, with sponsorship from the Virginia Lottery. T. J. Bell later took over the ride for the remainder of the season by starting and parking the majority of the races. The No. 26 team later became the No. 24 team in 2016.

On June 24, 2017, the team announced via Twitter that Scott Lagasse Jr. will drive the No. 26 at Daytona.

==== Car No. 26 results ====
Year	Driver	No.	Make	1	2	3	4	5	6	7	8	9	10	11	12	13	14	15	16	17	18	19	20	21	22	23	24	25	26	27	28	29	30	31	32	33	Owners	Pts
2015	Mike Wallace	26	Toyota	DAY; 13	ATL	LVS	PHO	CAL	TEX	BRI	RCH																										32nd	457
2015	Kenny Wallace	26	Toyota									TAL; 38																									32nd	457
2015	Ryan Ellis	26	Toyota										IOW; 35																								32nd	457
2015	Kyle Fowler	26	Toyota											CLT; 27																							32nd	457
2015	C. J. Faison	26	Toyota												DOV; 23	MCH; 40																					32nd	457
2015	T. J. Bell	26	Toyota														CHI; 23										DAR; 36		CHI; 38	KEN; 35	DOV; 36	CLT; 36	KAN; 36	TEX; 38	PHO; 36	HOM; 39	32nd	457
2015	Timmy Hill	26	Toyota															DAY; 11	KEN; 24		IND; 27																32nd	457
2015	Matt Wallace	26	Toyota																	NHA; 33		IOW; 25															32nd	457
2015	Tomy Drissi	26	Toyota																				GLN; 25	MOH; 32		ROA; 36											32nd	457
2015	Hermie Sadler	26	Toyota																						BRI; 29			RCH; 32									32nd	457
2017	Scott Lagasse Jr.	26	Toyota	DAY	ATL	LVS	PHO	CAL	TEX	BRI	RCH	TAL	CLT	DOV	POC	MCH	IOW	DAY; 14	KEN	NHA	IND	IOW	GLN	MOH	BRI	ROA	DAR	RCH	CHI	KEN	DOV	CLT	KAN	TEX	PHO	HOM	47th	23

=== Car No. 28 history ===
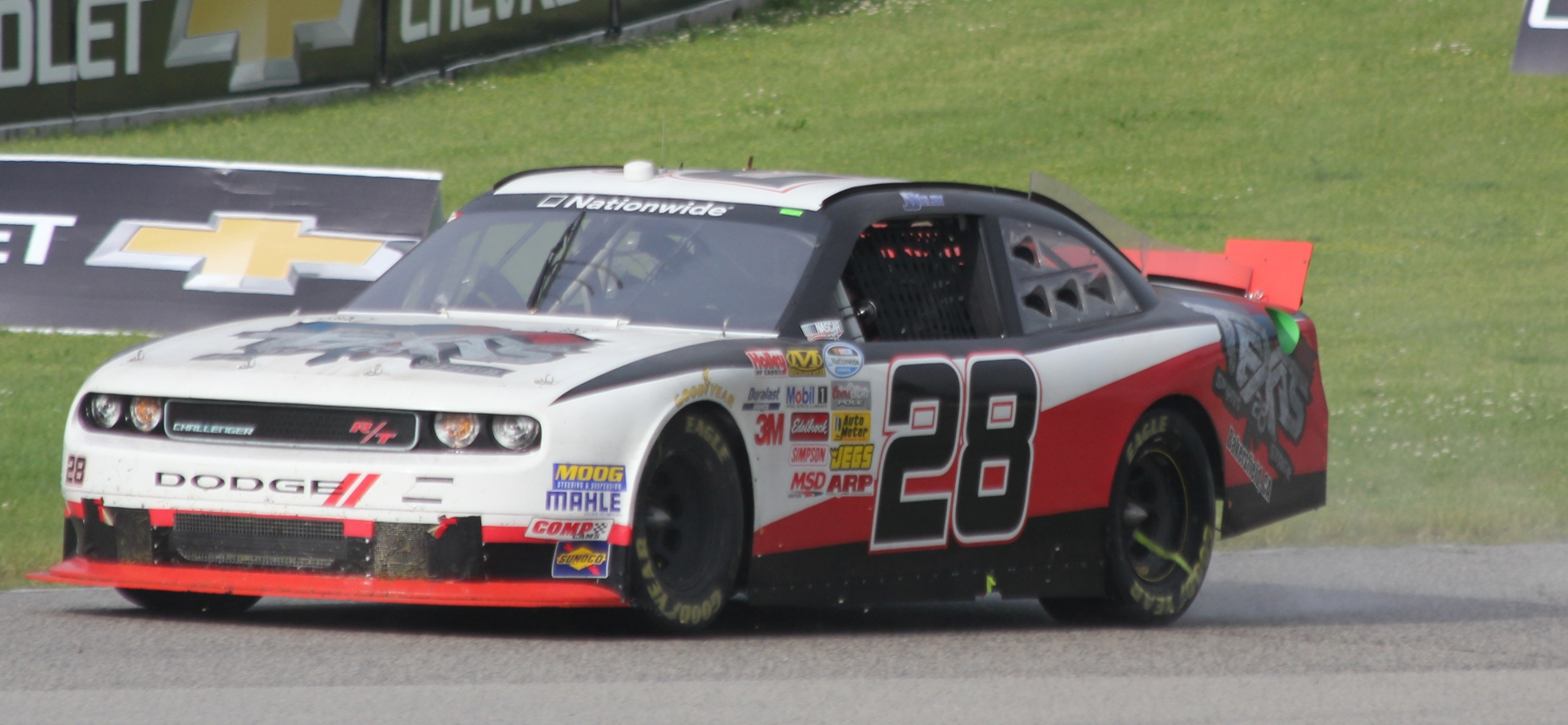
J. J. Yeley's 5th place car at Road America

The No. 28 was an original JGL Racing entry, having debuted at Daytona in 2014 as a Dodge. Mike Wallace ran the No. 28 at Daytona in 2014 with Unker's Medicated Cream as the sponsor, with the intent of running the full season. Wallace, an excellent Superspeedway racer, finished 13th in the race. Wallace ran the next four races, with a best finish of 20th at Phoenix. After Derek White (another owner who operates out of Carl Long's shop) ran the car at Fontana, J. J. Yeley moved over from the No. 93 car to become the team's primary driver. Yeley posted a strong 7th-place finish at Talladega, then ran a strong 5th on rain tires at Road America. At Watkins Glen, Yeley's No. 28 car was involved in a crash with Trevor Bayne entering turn 6, which both Yeley's crew chief and analyst Andy Petree noted as the third incident of the day in which Bayne had spun out another competitor. Afterwards, Yeley got out of his car and expressed his displeasure with Bayne as he passed by, and in his post-wreck interview. Yeley would be credited with a 35th-place finish out of 39 cars. At the season-finale at Homestead, the No. 28 team switched to Toyota equipment.

Yeley returned to the team for 2015. He would finish 4th at Talladega to bring JGL their best finish. Yeley finished 12th in the championship point standings.

For 2016, Dakoda Armstrong moved over from Richard Petty Motorsports to drive the No. 28 car full-time, with sponsorship from WinField. Armstrong started the season with a 14th place finish at Daytona. Armstrong would have a great consistent season, including a season best finish, 12th at Daytona. Armstrong would be moved to Joe Gibbs Racing for one race to drive the No. 18 replacing Matt Tifft at Iowa bringing his sponsor which JGL hired Drew Herring to drive the No. 28 car at Iowa, where he finished 12th.

For 2017, Armstrong returned, however was released by the team on September 25 for a lack of sponsorship.

On January 3, 2018, it was announced that Dylan Lupton would drive the No. 28 for at least 21 races in 2018. Lupton had previously driven the No. 24 part-time in 2017. Tony Mrakovich made his Xfinity Series debut in the No. 28 at Richmond, finishing 24th. On June 7, 2018, Dylan Lupton announced on Twitter that he left the team to find a more competitive car.

JGL Racing has been inactive since mid 2018.

==== Car No. 28 results ====
Year	Driver	No.	Make	1	2	3	4	5	6	7	8	9	10	11	12	13	14	15	16	17	18	19	20	21	22	23	24	25	26	27	28	29	30	31	32	33	Owners	Pts
2014	Mike Wallace	28	Dodge	DAY; 13	PHO; 20	LVS; 26	BRI; 25	CAL; 21																													22nd	720
2014	Derek White	28	Dodge						TEX; 36																												22nd	720
2014	J. J. Yeley	28	Dodge							DAR; 14	RCH; 18	TAL; 7	IOW; 18	CLT; 21	DOV; 28	MCH; 21	ROA; 5	KEN; 22	DAY; 35	NHA; 17	CHI; 14	IND; 24	IOW; 17	GLN; 35	MOH; 26	BRI; 30	ATL; 16	RCH; 31	CHI; 25	KEN; 23	DOV; 22	KAN; 18	CLT; 39	TEX; 20	PHO; 30		22nd	720
2014	J. J. Yeley	28	Toyota																																	HOM; 16	22nd	720
2015	J. J. Yeley	28	Toyota	DAY; 27	ATL; 19	LVS; 16	PHO; 24	CAL; 22	TEX; 19	BRI; 33	RCH; 19	TAL; 4	IOW; 34	CLT; 21	DOV; 18	MCH; 25	CHI; 16	DAY; 20	KEN; 18	NHA; 15	IND; 18	IOW; 18	GLN; 12	MOH; 16	BRI; 19	ROA; 35	DAR; 16	RCH; 20	CHI; 19	KEN; 15	DOV; 12	CLT; 19	KAN; 21	TEX; 23	PHO; 17	HOM; 21	18th	803
2016	Dakoda Armstrong	28	Toyota	DAY; 14	ATL; 21	LVS; 22	PHO; 18	CAL; 22	TEX; 26	BRI; 30	RCH; 14	TAL; 34	DOV; 21	CLT; 21	POC; 18	MCH; 24	IOW; 17	DAY; 12	KEN; 18	NHA; 17	IND; 20		GLN; 18	MOH; 21	BRI; 18	ROA; 13	DAR; 18	RCH; 16	CHI; 22	KEN; 18	DOV; 20	CLT; 19	KAN; 20	TEX; 20	PHO; 19	HOM; 19	19th	711
2016	Drew Herring	28	Toyota																			IOW; 12															19th	711
2017	Dakoda Armstrong	28	Toyota	DAY; 12	ATL; 21	LVS; 20	PHO; 17	CAL; 20	TEX; 17	BRI; 19	RCH; 16	TAL; 22	CLT; 20	DOV; 19	POC; 20	MCH; 20	IOW; 5	DAY; 3	KEN; 17	NHA; 24	IND; 20	IOW; 17	GLN; 21	MOH; 10	BRI; 24	ROA; 22	DAR; 29	RCH; 18	CHI; 16	KEN; 23	DOV	CLT	KAN	TEX	PHO	HOM	18th	638
2018	Dylan Lupton	28	Ford	DAY; 27	ATL; 21	LVS; 40	PHO; 23	CAL; 33	TEX; 17	BRI; 31		TAL; 36	DOV; 24	CLT; 33	POC; 23	MCH	IOW	CHI	DAY	KEN	NHA	IOW	GLN	MOH	BRI	ROA	DAR	IND	LVS	RCH	CLT	DOV	KAN	TEX	PHO	HOM	37th	174
2018	Tony Mrakovich	28	Ford								RCH; 24																										37th	174

=== Car No. 93 history ===
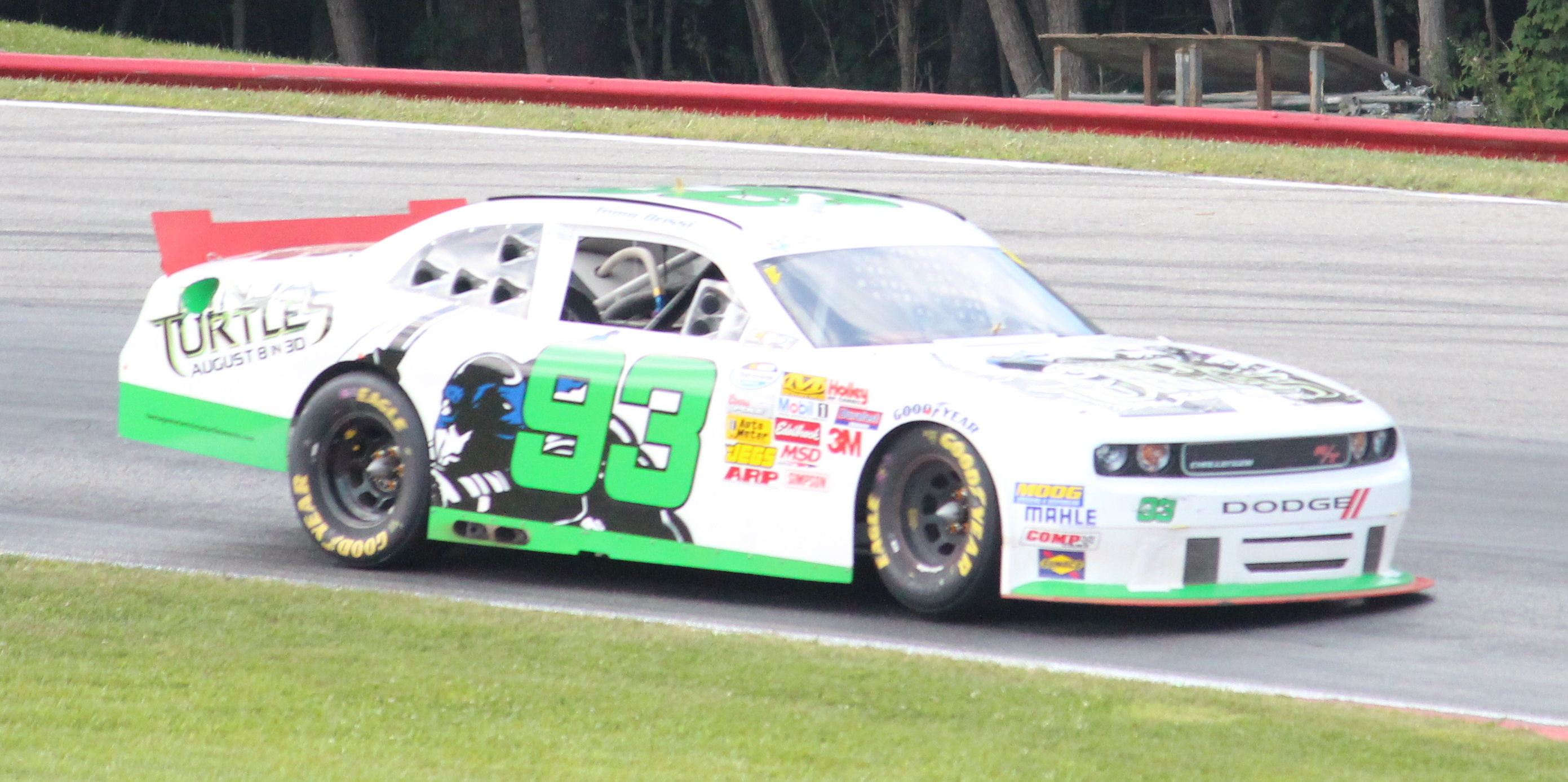
Tomy Drissi in the No. 93 at the Mid-Ohio Sports Car Course in 2014

The No. 93 was an original entry for JGL Racing in 2014, debuting as a Dodge at Daytona in February. Matt Carter (son of longtime Cup Series owner Travis Carter) drove the No. 93 at Daytona, failing to qualify. Carl Long ran the next race at Phoenix, parking after 13 laps for a 37th-place finish. J. J. Yeley joined the team at Vegas, finishing 21st. Long start and parked the car again at Bristol, then Yeley ran the next two races scoring two top 20s. Mike Wallace moved over from the No. 28 for two races before leaving the team. Long, Harrison Rhodes, Josh Reaume, and Kevin Lepage all ran races in the car.

Mike Wallace returned to the team at Kentucky. Wallace also ran the next race at Daytona in July with sponsorship from Smith Transportation, working out a deal with the team that would put his son Matt in the No. 93 at a race of his choice if Mike finished in the top-5. Though he didn't get that top-5, he finished a strong tenth. Up-and-comer Kevin Swindell joined the team at Indianapolis with sponsorship from Curb Records and John Christner Trucking. Road course racer and movie promoter Tomy Drissi drove the No. 93 car to a 20th-place finish at Watkins Glen with sponsorship from the new Teenage Mutant Ninja Turtles film in 3D. Drissi also ran the following week at Mid-Ohio, finishing 23rd. Swindell returned to the team for eight additional races, with a best finish of 22nd twice. Ryan Ellis, Mike Harmon, and T. J. Bell also ran races for the team.

In 2015, JGL shut down the No. 93, instead creating the new full-time No. 24 and part-time No. 26. The No. 93 crew was moved to the No. 24 car. However, nine races into the season, the No. 24 was shut down and the No. 26 became a full-time entry. The team then announced that the No. 93 would return as the new part-time entry. However the car has not been fielded as of the second to last race of the season.

==== Car No. 93 results ====
Year	Driver	No.	Make	1	2	3	4	5	6	7	8	9	10	11	12	13	14	15	16	17	18	19	20	21	22	23	24	25	26	27	28	29	30	31	32	33	Owners	Pts
2014	Matt Carter	93	Dodge	DAY; DNQ																																	28th	525
2014	Carl Long	93	Dodge		PHO; 37		BRI; 38					TAL; 37	IOW; 28																								28th	525
2014	J. J. Yeley	93	Dodge			LVS; 21		CAL; 19	TEX; 16																												28th	525
2014	Mike Wallace	93	Dodge							DAR; 17	RCH; 27							KEN; 25	DAY; 10																		28th	525
2014	Harrison Rhodes	93	Dodge											CLT; 38		MCH; 32																					28th	525
2014	Josh Reaume	93	Dodge												DOV; 25																						28th	525
2014	Kevin Lepage	93	Dodge														ROA; 38																				28th	525
2014	Ryan Ellis	93	Dodge																	NHA; 36								RCH; 24									28th	525
2014	Mike Harmon	93	Dodge																		CHI; 38																28th	525
2014	Kevin Swindell	93	Dodge																			IND; 23	IOW; 29			BRI; 27	ATL; 36		CHI; 31	KEN; 22	DOV; 33	KAN; 37	CLT; 23	TEX; 22			28th	525
2014	Tomy Drissi	93	Dodge																					GLN; 20	MOH; 23												28th	525
2014	T. J. Bell	93	Dodge																																PHO; 38	HOM; 15	28th	525
