= Harrison Rhodes =

American racing driver (born 1993)

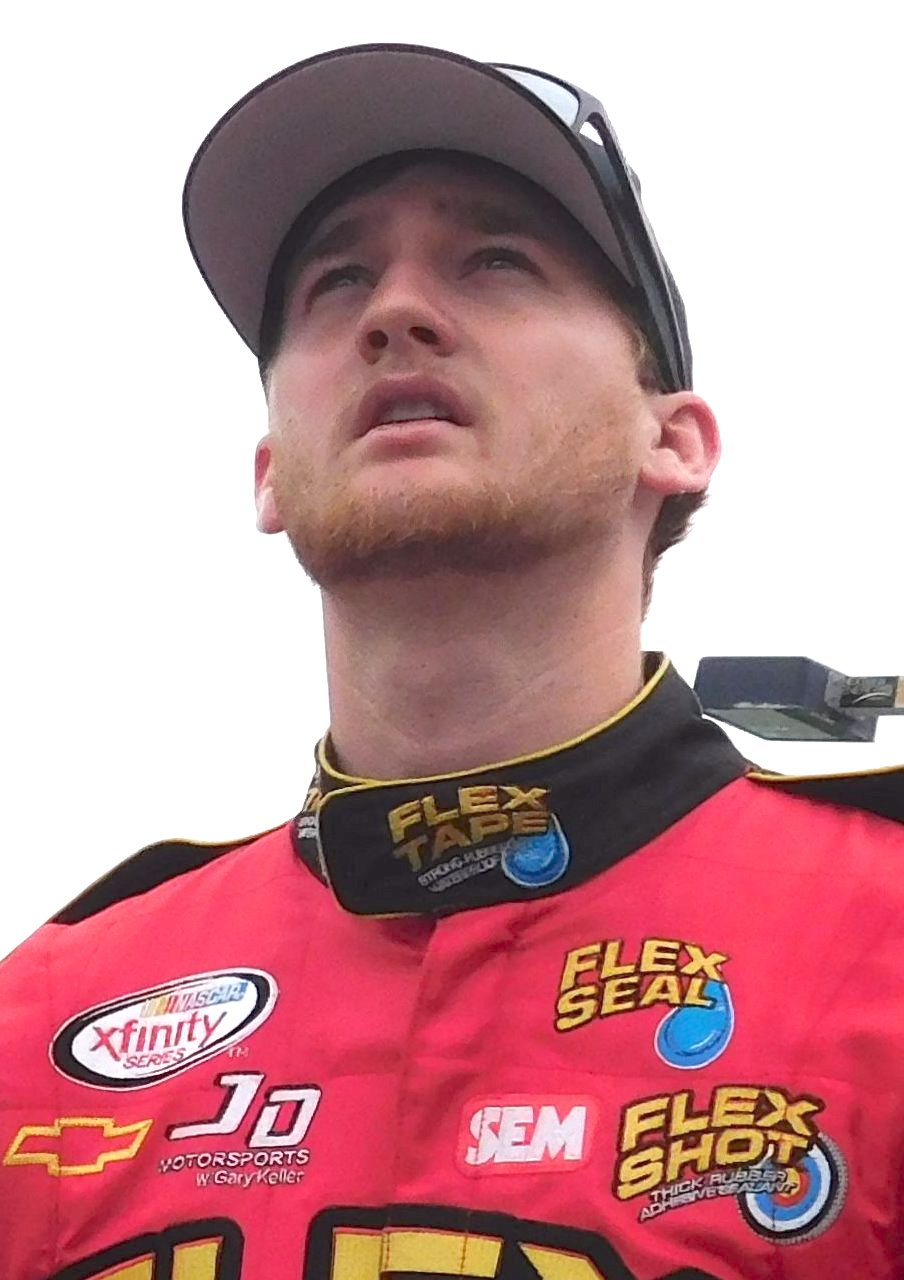
- Rhodes at Daytona International Speedway in 2017
- Born: Harrison L. Rhodes; July 15, 1993 (age 33); High Point, North Carolina, U.S.

NASCAR Cup Series career
- 6 races run over 1 year
- 2018 position: 39th
- Best finish: 39th (2018)
- First race: 2018 Folds of Honor QuikTrip 500 (Atlanta)
- Last race: 2018 Gander Outdoors 400 (Dover)
Wins	Top tens	Poles
0	0	0

NASCAR O'Reilly Auto Parts Series career
- 84 races run over 5 years
- 2017 position: 24th
- Best finish: 24th (2015, 2017)
- First race: 2013 Dollar General 200 (Phoenix)
- Last race: 2017 Ford EcoBoost 300 (Homestead)
Wins	Top tens	Poles
0	2	0
- Statistics up to date as of February 19, 2022.

Harrison L. Rhodes (born July 15, 1993) is an American professional stock car racing driver. He last competed part-time in the NASCAR Xfinity Series, driving the No. 52 Chevrolet Camaro for Jimmy Means Racing. He is not related to NASCAR Craftsman Truck Series driver Ben Rhodes.

== Racing career ==
A native of High Point, North Carolina, Rhodes started racing at the age of ten in midget cars. He moved up to Legends cars at the end of 2007, battling for the 2009 national championship; he wound up finishing second.

After competing in NASCAR local competition and the UARA Late Model Series in 2011, Rhodes moved up in 2012 to the NASCAR K&N Pro Series East; after racing in two events for Spraker Racing, he moved to MacDonald Motorsports, racing in three of the final seven races of the season. He posted his best finish in the series, fourth, in his first race of the year at Bowman-Gray Stadium. Rhodes also drove in four Pro Cup Series races during the year, posting a best finish of fifth at Anderson Motor Speedway.

For 2013, Rhodes moved up to the Nationwide Series, making his series debut at Phoenix International Raceway driving for Rick Ware Racing in association with R3 Motorsports in the No. 23 Ford.

In 2014, Rhodes moved to SR² Motorsports, driving the No. 24 Toyota in selected races starting at Daytona International Speedway.

For 2015, JD Motorsports announced that Rhodes would be their third full-time driver with the No. 0 Chevrolet Camaro. He failed to qualify for the season opener, missed four races and drive two for MBM Motorsports. He had a best finish of ninth at the July Daytona race. On January 28, 2016, it was announced Rhodes will drive the No. 97 Chevrolet Camaro for Obaika Racing full-time, replacing various drivers. Rhodes was replaced by Ryan Ellis for the spring Texas race.

On February 7, 2017, JD Motorsports announced that Rhodes would return to the team for the full 2017 season, driving the No. 01 car. However, Sheldon Creed replaced Rhodes in the No. 01 at Mid-Ohio Sports Car Course. Vinnie Miller replaced Rhodes full-time in the No. 01 for the 2018 season.

In February 2018, Rhodes joined Rick Ware Racing to make his Cup Series debut in the Folds of Honor QuikTrip 500 at Atlanta Motor Speedway, driving the No. 51 Camaro ZL1.

== Personal life ==
Rhodes attended NC State where he graduated in 2016.

== Motorsports career results ==
=== NASCAR ===
(key) (Bold – Pole position awarded by qualifying time. Italics – Pole position earned by points standings or practice time. * – Most laps led.)

==== Monster Energy Cup Series ====
Monster Energy NASCAR Cup Series results
Year	Team	No.	Make	1	2	3	4	5	6	7	8	9	10	11	12	13	14	15	16	17	18	19	20	21	22	23	24	25	26	27	28	29	30	31	32	33	34	35	36	MENCC	Pts	Ref
2018	Rick Ware Racing	51	Chevy	DAY	ATL; 33	LVS	PHO	CAL	MAR; 35	TEX; 22		RCH; 36	TAL	DOV	KAN	CLT	POC	MCH	SON	CHI	DAY	KEN	NHA	POC	GLN	MCH	BRI	DAR	IND	LVS	RCH	CLT								39th	24	
2018	Rick Ware Racing	51	Toyota								BRI; 37																													39th	24	
2018	Rick Ware Racing	52	Chevy																														DOV; 38	TAL	KAN	MAR	TEX	PHO	HOM	39th	24	

==== Xfinity Series ====
NASCAR Xfinity Series results
Year	Team	No.	Make	1	2	3	4	5	6	7	8	9	10	11	12	13	14	15	16	17	18	19	20	21	22	23	24	25	26	27	28	29	30	31	32	33	NXSC	Pts	Ref
2013	Rick Ware Racing	23	Ford	DAY	PHO; 25	LVS	BRI	CAL	TEX	RCH	TAL	DAR; 31	CLT	DOV; 26	IOW; 23	MCH	ROA	KEN; 29	DAY	NHA	CHI; 32	IND	IOW	GLN	MOH	BRI	ATL	RCH	CHI	KEN; 32	DOV	KAN	CLT	TEX	PHO	HOM	49th	78^{2}	
2014	SR² Motorsports	24	Toyota	DAY; 39	PHO	LVS	BRI	CAL	TEX	DAR	RCH	TAL	IOW																								55th	40	
2014	JGL Racing	93	Dodge											CLT; 38	DOV	MCH; 32	ROA	KEN	DAY																		55th	40	
2014	MBM Motorsports	72	Chevy																	NHA; 37										KEN; 35	DOV; 36	KAN	CLT	TEX	PHO	HOM	55th	40	
2014	JD Motorsports	4	Chevy																		CHI; RL^{†}	IND	IOW	GLN	MOH	BRI	ATL	RCH	CHI								55th	40	
2015	JD Motorsports	0	Chevy	DAY; DNQ	ATL; 34	LVS; 26	PHO; 23	CAL; 25	TEX; 27	BRI; 29	RCH; 22	TAL; 36	IOW; 37	CLT; 35	DOV; 26	MCH; 22		DAY; 9	KEN; 35	NHA; 39	IND; 25	IOW; 35	GLN	MOH	BRI; 34	ROA	DAR; 33	RCH; 23	CHI	KEN; 34	DOV; 27			TEX; 34	PHO; 22	HOM; 24	24th	430	
2015	JD Motorsports	4	Chevy														CHI; 25																				24th	430	
2015	MBM Motorsports	13	Dodge																													CLT; 34	KAN; 27				24th	430	
2016	Obaika Racing	97	Chevy	DAY; DNQ	ATL; 35	LVS; 32	PHO; 30	CAL; 35	TEX					CLT; 24	POC																						33rd	121	
2016	Rick Ware Racing	25	Chevy							BRI; 26	RCH; 27	TAL	DOV																								33rd	121	
2016	MBM Motorsports	13	Dodge													MCH; 26																					33rd	121	
2016	MBM Motorsports	13	Chevy														IOW; 26	DAY	KEN; 38	NHA					BRI; 38	ROA	DAR	RCH	CHI	KEN	DOV	CLT	KAN	TEX	PHO	HOM	33rd	121	
2016	MBM Motorsports	13	Toyota																		IND; 34	IOW	GLN	MOH													33rd	121	
2017	JD Motorsports	01	Chevy	DAY; 10	ATL; 24	LVS; 27	PHO; 23	CAL; 31	TEX; 35	BRI; 23	RCH; 24	TAL; 22	CLT; 34	DOV; 37	POC; 37	MCH; 22	IOW; 36	DAY; 36	KEN; 28	NHA; 18	IND; 22	IOW; 15	GLN; 23	MOH	BRI; 31	ROA	DAR; 24	RCH; 30	CHI; 25	KEN; 24	DOV; 37	CLT; 22	KAN; 24	TEX; 25	PHO; 27		24th	321	
2017	JD Motorsports	15	Chevy																																	HOM; 39	24th	321	
2022	Jimmy Means Racing	52	Chevy	DAY; DNQ	CAL	LVS	PHO	ATL; DNQ	COA	RCH; DNQ	MAR; DNQ	TAL	DOV	DAR	TEX	CLT	PIR	NSH	ROA	ATL	NHA	POC	IND	MCH	GLN	DAY	DAR	KAN	BRI	TEX	TAL	CLT	LVS	HOM	MAR	PHO	-*	-*	
^{†} – Relieved Jeffrey Earnhardt

==== K&N Pro Series East ====
NASCAR K&N Pro Series East results
Year	Team	No.	Make	1	2	3	4	5	6	7	8	9	10	11	12	13	14	NKNPSEC	Pts	Ref
2012	Spraker Racing	37	Chevy	BRI	GRE	RCH	IOW	BGS; 4	JFC	LGY; 19								25th	134	
2012	MacDonald Motorsports	49	Toyota								CNB; 8	COL	IOW					25th	134	
2012	MacDonald Motorsports	94	Toyota											NHA; 33	DOV	GRE		25th	134	
2012	MacDonald Motorsports	49	Dodge														CAR; 22	25th	134	
2013	MacDonald Motorsports	49	Toyota	BRI	GRE	FIF; 23												36th	67	
2013	Spraker Racing	37	Chevy				RCH; 22	BGS	IOW	LGY	COL	IOW	VIR	GRE; 20	NHA	DOV	RAL	36th	67	

^{*} Season still in progress
^{1} Ineligible for series points
^{2} Rhodes began the 2013 season not eligible for Nationwide Series points, but began receiving points starting at Dover in July.
