= GMS Racing =

American stock car racing team

- Owner(s): Maury Gallagher; Spencer Gallagher
- Base: Statesville, North Carolina
- Series: NASCAR Craftsman Truck Series
- Manufacturer: Chevrolet
- Opened: 2011
- Closed: 2023

Career
- Debut: Xfinity Series: 2016 Axalta Faster. Tougher. Brighter. 200 (Phoenix); Craftsman Truck Series: 2013 SFP 250 (Kansas); ARCA Menards Series: 2011 Ansell Protective Gloves 200 (Lucas Oil); ARCA Menards Series East: 2019 Skip's Western Outfitters 175 (New Smyrna); ARCA Menards Series West: 2019 Arizona Lottery 100 (Phoenix)
- Latest race: Xfinity Series: 2019 Ford EcoBoost 300 (Homestead); Craftsman Truck Series: 2023 NASCAR Craftsman Truck Series Championship Race (Phoenix); ARCA Menards Series: 2022 Shore Lunch 200 (Toledo); ARCA Menards Series East: 2022 Sioux Chief Showdown 200 (Bristol); ARCA Menards Series West: 2022 General Tire 200 (Sonoma)
- Races competed: Total: 517; Xfinity Series: 106; Craftsman Truck Series: 253; ARCA Menards Series: 124; ARCA Menards Series East: 27; ARCA Menards Series West: 7
- Drivers' Championships: Total: 5 Xfinity Series: 0 Craftsman Truck Series: 2; 2016, 2020; ARCA Menards Series: 1; 2015; ARCA Menards Series East: 2; 2019, 2020; ARCA Menards Series West: 0
- Race victories: Total: 71; Xfinity Series: 1 Craftsman Truck Series: 45; ARCA Menards Series: 15; ARCA Menards East: 9 ARCA Menards Series West: 1
- Pole positions: Total: 26; Xfinity Series: 0 Craftsman Truck Series: 15; ARCA Menards Series: 5 ARCA Menards Series East: 3 ARCA Menards Series West: 3

GMS Racing was an American professional stock car racing team that competed in the NASCAR Craftsman Truck Series, ARCA Menards Series and the NASCAR Xfinity Series.

GMS Racing previously competed in the NASCAR Xfinity Series from 2016 to 2019 and in the ARCA Menards Series from 2011 to 2015 and again from 2019 to 2022. The team had a driver development program, Drivers Edge Development, operated in conjunction with JR Motorsports.

Owner Maurice J. Gallagher Jr. is the chairman and CEO of Allegiant Travel Company, which intermittently sponsored the team through its Allegiant Air brand.

On August 23, 2023, the team announced that it would cease operations at the end of the 2023 racing season, along with GMS Fabrication, a separate entity affiliated with the team.

== History ==
Before forming his own team, Maurice Gallagher was involved in NASCAR with local Las Vegas driver and friend Spencer Clark's team, which competed in the NASCAR Busch East Series and Busch Series until Clark's unexpected death in 2006.

GMS Racing, initially known as Gallagher Motorsports, was formed in 2011 when they entered ARCA competition. The team expanded operations into the Camping World Truck Series in 2013, and later entered the Xfinity Series in 2016. The team was originally based in Charlotte, North Carolina, occupying the former BAM Racing shop. They later relocated, and BK Racing took over their previous facility.

In 2014, GMS Racing acquired the assets of Richard Childress Racing's Truck Series program and entered into a technical alliance with the organization. In 2015, former crew chief Mike Beam became competition director, and both Richard Childress Racing and Chevrolet increased their technical support. That same year, the team relocated to Statesville, North Carolina, to a facility previously used by Evernham Motorsports and later Richard Petty Motorsports. The facility had been vacant since 2010.

GMS Racing also adopted a number font previously used by Braun Racing and Turner Scott Motorsports. Starting in 2016, the No. 21 team in the Xfinity Series alternated between its usual number style and the font used by Wood Brothers Racing. In early 2017, GMS Racing formed an alliance with Halmar Friesen Racing, which was later expanded in August of the same year.

In early 2019, GMS Racing announced the creation of a driver development program, Drivers Edge Development, in a partnership with JR Motorsports. The program placed drivers in GMS's NASCAR K&N Pro Series, ARCA Menards Series, and NASCAR Camping World Truck Series teams, as well as JR Motorsports' Late Model and NASCAR Xfinity Series teams. Mentors included Mardy Lindley (GMS crew chief) and Josh Berry (at the time a JR Motorsports Late Model driver). The inaugural class of drivers, which was announced on January 24, 2019, were Noah Gragson, John Hunter Nemechek, Zane Smith, Sheldon Creed, Sam Mayer, and Adam Lemke. Carson Hocevar also joined the program later on in 2019. The 2023 season was the last for the program when GMS Racing closed down. The class of drivers in the DED program that year included GMS Truck Series drivers Rajah Caruth and Daniel Dye as well as JRM late model driver Carson Kvapil.

On December 1, 2021, Gallagher purchased a majority interest in the former Richard Petty Motorsports for $19 million. The deal included both of RPM's charters; the No. 43 continued to operate under its charter, while a second charter, leased to Rick Ware Racing for the No. 51 from 2019 to 2021, was transferred to a new No. 42 car for the team. The team was subsequently rebranded as Petty GMS Motorsports. However, GMS Racing continued to operate independently from Petty GMS, and Richard Petty did not buy into GMS' Truck and ARCA teams. In 2023, Petty GMS Motorsports was renamed to Legacy Motor Club after seven-time Cup Series champion Jimmie Johnson purchased a stake in the team.

On August 23, 2023, GMS Racing announced that the team and GMS Fabrication would cease operations at the end of the 2023 season. Gallagher, alongside Johnson, will shift focus to developing Legacy Motor Club in the Cup Series. The former GMS Fabrication building was acquired by Rackley W.A.R. in late-2024.

== Xfinity Series ==
=== Car No. 21 history ===
Part-time (2016)

On February 4, 2016, GMS Racing announced that they would field a part-time Chevrolet Camaro for Spencer Gallagher in 13 races, starting at Phoenix. The car would carry the No. 21. Gallagher finished 23rd in his debut race. Gallagher competed in a total of seven races in the No. 21 car during the 2016 season, with his best finish being eighth at Daytona in July.

==== Car No. 21 results ====
Year	Driver	No.	Make	1	2	3	4	5	6	7	8	9	10	11	12	13	14	15	16	17	18	19	20	21	22	23	24	25	26	27	28	29	30	31	32	33	NXSC	Pts
2016	Spencer Gallagher	21	Chevy	DAY	ATL	LVS	PHO; 23	CAL; 24	TEX	BRI	RCH; 17	TAL	DOV	CLT; 29	POC	MCH	IOW	DAY; 8	KEN	NHA	IND	IOW	GLN; 22	MOH	BRI	ROA	DAR	RCH	CHI	KEN	DOV	CLT; 24	KAN	TEX	PHO	HOM	42nd	347

=== Car No. 23 history ===
Spencer Gallagher (2017–2018)

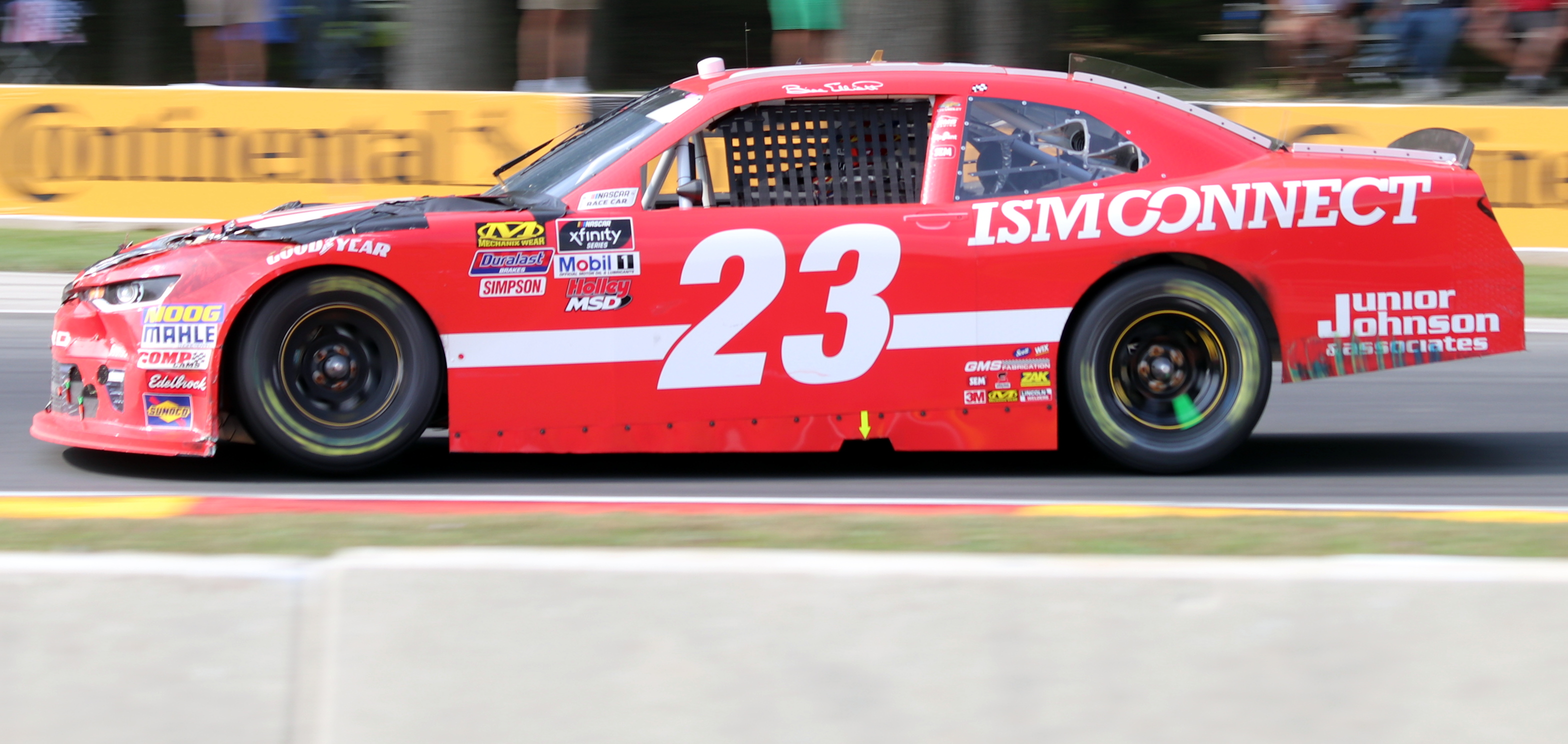
Bill Elliott at Road America in 2018.

On December 1, 2016, GMS Racing announced that they would field a full-time No. 23 Chevrolet Camaro for Spencer Gallagher, as the No. 21 was occupied by Richard Childress Racing driver Daniel Hemric. Gallagher had a disappointing rookie season in 2017, achieving only one top-10 finish at Richmond and recording eight DNFs.

However, the organization secured its first NASCAR Xfinity Series victory with Gallagher in the spring of 2018 at Talladega Superspeedway. Just four days after his win, on May 2, 2018, NASCAR announced that Gallagher was suspended indefinitely for a violation of NASCAR's substance-abuse policy.

Johnny Sauter was named as a substitute driver. Brennan Poole tested the car at Charlotte, leading to speculation that he might drive in the upcoming Charlotte race. However, it was later confirmed that Cup Series driver Chase Elliott would drive the car for races at Pocono, Chicagoland, Daytona, and Bristol.

Alex Bowman was subsequently announced as the driver of the No. 23 for Michigan and Kentucky, while Justin Haley made his NASCAR Xfinity Series debut in the No. 23 at Iowa. Casey Roderick returned to the series to drive the No. 23 in the July Iowa race, and later that evening, it was revealed that A. J. Allmendinger would drive the No. 23 at Watkins Glen the following weekend.

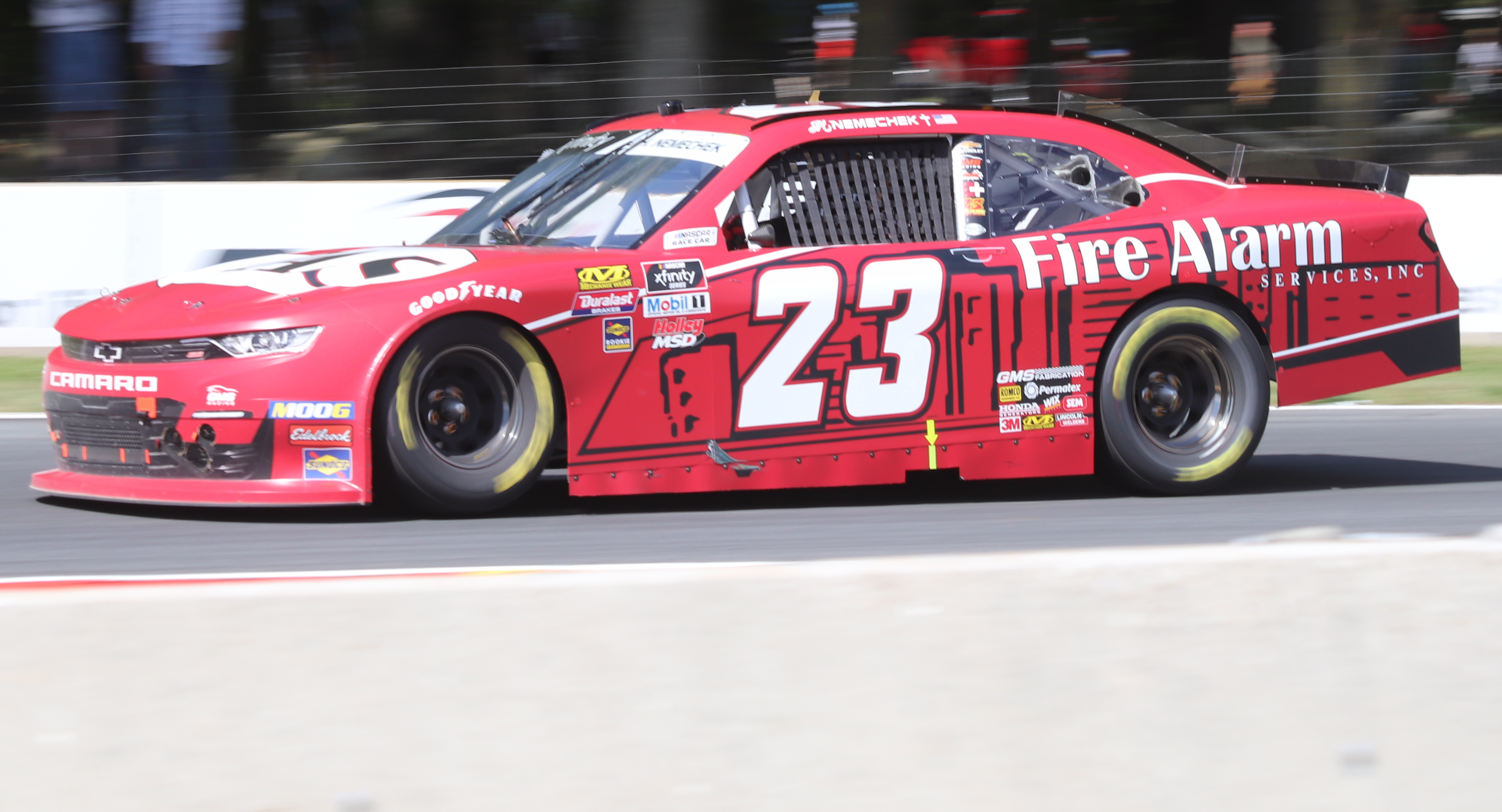
Nemechek's No. 23 in 2019

On August 4, 2018, GMS Racing announced that NASCAR Hall of Famer and 1988 NASCAR Winston Cup Series champion Bill Elliott would come out of retirement to drive the No. 23 at the Road America race on August 25.

John Hunter Nemechek (2019)

John Hunter Nemechek joined the No. 23 car from Chip Ganassi Racing to run the full season in 2019. Despite leading only 14 laps, Nemechek qualified for the NASCAR Xfinity Series playoffs (known as "The Chase") and performed well, finishing seventh in the final points standings—the best result for GMS Racing. After the season, Nemechek announced that he would be leaving to join Front Row Motorsports in the NASCAR Cup Series, leaving the No. 23 car without a driver for the 2020 season. During his one year at GMS Racing, Nemechek recorded six top-5 finishes and 19 top-10s.

==== Car No. 23 results ====
Year	Driver	No.	Make	1	2	3	4	5	6	7	8	9	10	11	12	13	14	15	16	17	18	19	20	21	22	23	24	25	26	27	28	29	30	31	32	33	NXSC	Pts
2017	Spencer Gallagher	23	Chevy	DAY; 36	ATL; 28	LVS; 23	PHO; 18	CAL; 19	TEX; 14	BRI; 18	RCH; 10	TAL; 39	CLT; 37	DOV; 31	POC; 18	MCH; 18	IOW; 30	DAY; 24	KEN; 13	NHA; 35	IND; 28	IOW; 37	GLN; 32	MOH; 36	BRI; 23	ROA; 24	DAR; 34	RCH; 22	CHI; 14	KEN; 15	DOV; 24	CLT; 34	KAN; 21	TEX; 15	PHO; 17	HOM; 19	19th	433
2018	Spencer Gallagher	23	Chevy	DAY; 6	ATL; 14	LVS; 10	PHO; 14	CAL; 11	TEX; 10	BRI; 5	RCH; 17	TAL; 1								KEN; 20				MOH; 8					LVS; 10	RCH; 12	CLT; 19	DOV; 5	KAN; 33	TEX; 9	PHO; 10	HOM; 17	11th	2178
2018	Johnny Sauter	23	Chevy										DOV; 6								NHA; 19																11th	2178
2018	Chase Elliott	23	Chevy											CLT; 37	POC; 2			CHI; 10	DAY; 29						BRI; 8		DAR; 6	IND; 4									11th	2178
2018	Alex Bowman	23	Chevy													MCH; 21																					11th	2178
2018	Justin Haley	23	Chevy														IOW; 12																				11th	2178
2018	Casey Roderick	23	Chevy																			IOW; 15															11th	2178
2018	A. J. Allmendinger	23	Chevy																				GLN; 2														11th	2178
2018	Bill Elliott	23	Chevy																							ROA; 20											11th	2178
2019	John Hunter Nemechek	23	Chevy	DAY; 8	ATL; 20	LVS; 2	PHO; 9	CAL; 28	TEX; 9	BRI; 5	RCH; 7	TAL; 6	DOV; 8	CLT; 12	POC; 12	MCH; 8	IOW; 8	CHI; 11	DAY; 22	KEN; 12	NHA; 36	IOW; 3	GLN; 12	MOH; 31	BRI; 3	ROA; 26	DAR; 21	IND; 31	LVS; 8	RCH; 15	CLT; 7	DOV; 8	KAN; 8	TEX; 5	PHO; 4	HOM; 6	7th	2253

=== Car No. 24 history ===
Justin Haley (2018)

Although there were rumors for many months that Brennan Poole and Brett Moffitt would share the car full-time in 2018, the car did not return until later in the year, renumbered as the No. 24. Justin Haley drove the car at the July race in Daytona and again at Watkins Glen in August. At Daytona, Haley was running third on the last lap coming off Turn 4. He made a bold move to pass both Kyle Larson and Elliott Sadler and crossed the finish line first. However, it was determined that Haley had driven below the yellow line while passing, even though there appeared to be enough room to make the pass. As a result, NASCAR penalized Haley, stripping him of the win and awarding it to Kyle Larson, with Haley being placed as the last car on the lead lap. Many expected Haley to drive this car full-time in 2019, but he moved on to Kaulig Racing instead.

==== Car No. 24 results ====
Year	Driver	No.	Make	1	2	3	4	5	6	7	8	9	10	11	12	13	14	15	16	17	18	19	20	21	22	23	24	25	26	27	28	29	30	31	32	33	NXSC	Pts
2018	Justin Haley	24	Chevy	DAY	ATL	LVS	PHO	CAL	TEX	BRI	RCH	TAL	DOV	CLT	POC	MCH	IOW	CHI	DAY; 18	KEN	NHA	IOW	GLN; 38	MOH	BRI	ROA	DAR	IND	LVS	RCH	CLT	DOV	KAN	TEX	PHO	HOM	45th	92

=== Car No. 96 history ===
Ben Kennedy (2017)

On April 17, 2017, it was announced that Ben Kennedy would pilot a new second Xfinity entry for GMS Racing in twelve races, starting with the May race at Charlotte Motor Speedway. Jeff Stankiewicz, who had served as Kennedy's crew chief during his 2016 Truck Series playoff run, was also appointed crew chief for the No. 96. Brett Moffitt drove the No. 96 at the second Iowa race, securing an 11th-place finish. However, the No. 96 team did not compete in another race after Darlington Raceway, and the team withdrew from several races afterward due to a lack of sponsorship.

==== Car No. 96 results ====
Year	Driver	No.	Make	1	2	3	4	5	6	7	8	9	10	11	12	13	14	15	16	17	18	19	20	21	22	23	24	25	26	27	28	29	30	31	32	33	NXSC	Pts
2017	Ben Kennedy	96	Chevy	DAY	ATL	LVS	PHO	CAL	TEX	BRI	RCH	TAL	CLT; 25	DOV; 18	POC; Wth	MCH; 36	IOW	DAY	KEN; 32	NHA	IND; 18				BRI; 19	ATL	DAR; 12	RCH; Wth	CHI; Wth	KEN	DOV; Wth	CLT; Wth	KAN	TEX	PHO	HOM	28th	326
2017	Brett Moffitt	96	Chevy																			IOW; 11	GLN	MOH													28th	326

=== Closure ===
On November 21, 2019, GMS Racing announced the closure of their Xfinity Series program to concentrate on their Truck Series and ARCA Menards Series teams.

== Craftsman Truck Series ==
=== Truck No. 2 history ===
Cody Coughlin (2018)

On January 16, 2018, it was announced that Cody Coughlin would drive the No. 2 JEGS Chevrolet for the 2018 NASCAR Camping World Truck Series. On September 24, 2018, Coughlin was released due to sponsorship issues. Spencer Gallagher drove the truck at the Talladega race, where he finished 25th. Sheldon Creed was then announced as the driver for the remainder of the season.

Sheldon Creed (2018–2021)

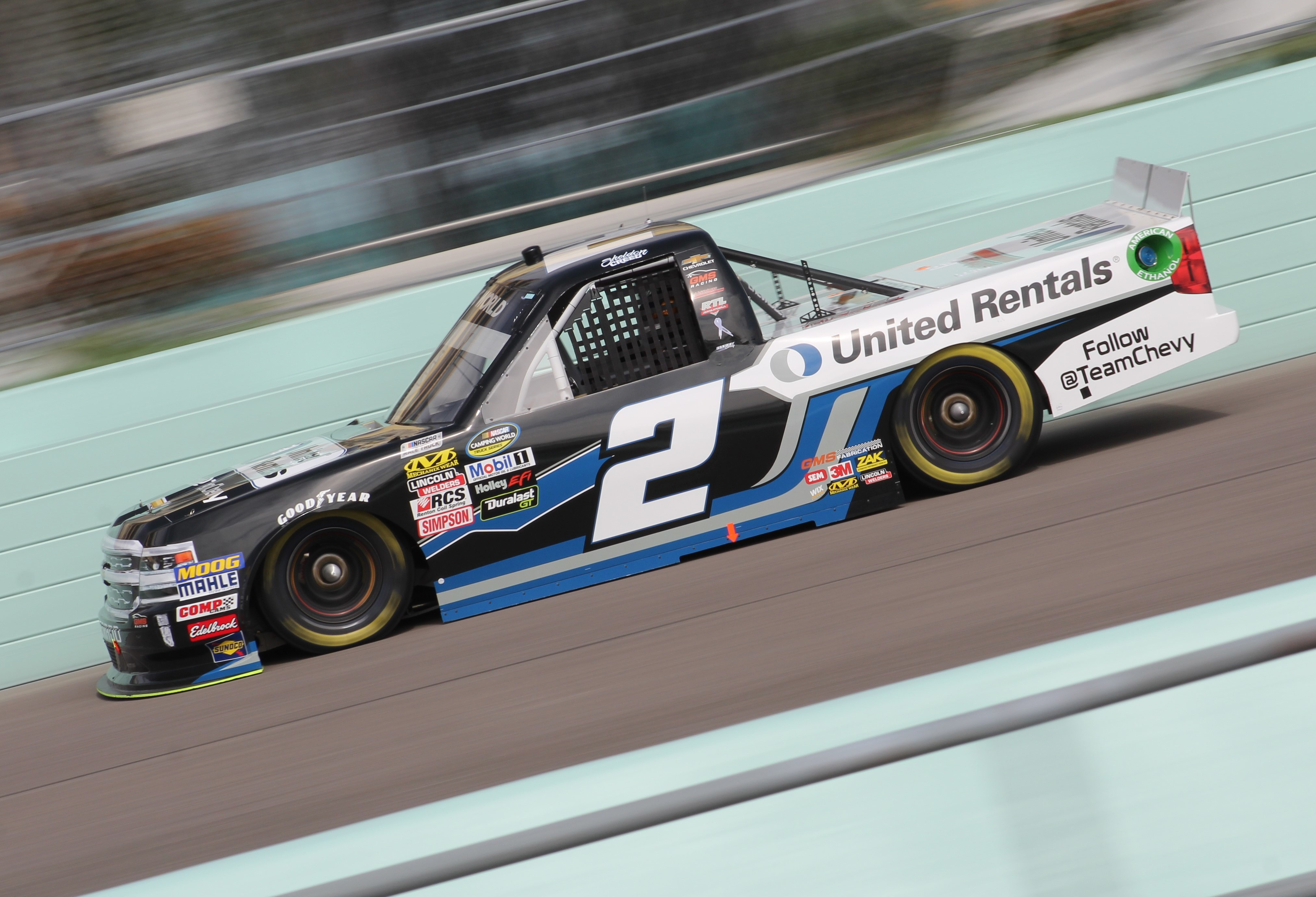
Sheldon Creed in the No. 2 at Homestead–Miami Speedway in 2018

Sheldon Creed took over the No. 2 truck full-time in 2019, after running the last four races of the 2018 season. On July 22, 2019, GMS Racing announced that Jeff Stankiewicz would replace Doug Randolph as the crew chief for the No. 2 truck. On August 6, 2019, NASCAR suspended Stankiewicz, truck chief Austin Pollak, and engineer Jonathan Stewart for three races through September 10 after the No. 2 truck was found to have a ballast container violation during post-race inspection at Eldora Dirt Derby. Darren Fraley served as interim crew chief during Stankiewicz's suspension. Creed finished 11th in points with four top-5 finishes and 11 top-10 finishes.

Creed had a breakout season in 2020. He won his first race in a rain-shortened Buckle Up in Your Truck 225, and his first non-rain-shortened win in the BrakeBest Select 159 five weeks later. Creed eventually won the championship with five wins, nine top-fives, and thirteen top-tens.

Creed remained in the No. 2 for the 2021 NASCAR Camping World Truck Series. At Darlington Raceway, crashes in the final stage eliminated the leaders, and Creed took the lead on the final restart, holding off Ben Rhodes to win his first race of the season. Creed entered the playoffs as the fifth seed and won the first two races at Gateway and Darlington. A crash at Las Vegas dropped Creed outside of the top four in points, which are required to advance to the Championship Round. Although he finished ninth in the Round of 8's elimination race at Martinsville, he was four points short of making the final round. Creed moved to the Richard Childress Racing No. 2 car in the Xfinity Series in 2022, and the No. 2 truck was shut down.

==== Truck No. 2 results ====
Year	Driver	No.	Make	1	2	3	4	5	6	7	8	9	10	11	12	13	14	15	16	17	18	19	20	21	22	23	Owners	Pts
2018	Cody Coughlin	2	Chevy	DAY; 17	ATL; 20	LVS; 8	MAR; 26	DOV; 6	KAN; 7	CLT; 17	TEX; 8	IOW; 7	GTW; 9	CHI; 12	KEN; 12	ELD; 28	POC; 14	MCH; 14	BRI; 19	MSP; 15	LVS; 24						14th	546
2018	Spencer Gallagher	2	Chevy																			TAL; 25					14th	546
2018	Sheldon Creed	2	Chevy																				MAR; 19	TEX; 25	PHO; 10	HOM; 5	14th	546
2019	Sheldon Creed	2	Chevy	DAY; 17	ATL; 12	LVS; 6	MAR; 17	TEX; 22	DOV; 27	KAN; 19	CLT; 12	TEX; 6	IOW; 6	GTW; 7	CHI; 11	KEN; 21	POC; 25	ELD; 2	MCH; 2	BRI; 6	MSP; 4	LVS; 4	TAL; 9	MAR; 11	PHO; 12	HOM; 9	11th	726
2020	Sheldon Creed	2	Chevy	DAY; 9	LVS; 10	CLT; 5	ATL; 14	HOM; 20	POC; 3*	KEN; 1	TEX; 16	KAN; 8	KAN; 26	MCH; 30	DAY; 1*	DOV; 22	GTW; 1	DAR; 18*	RCH; 13	BRI; 11	LVS; 2*	TAL; 12	KAN; 2*	TEX; 1*	MAR; 8*	PHO; 1	1st	4040
2021	Sheldon Creed	2	Chevy	DAY; 6	DAY; 2*	LVS; 18	ATL; 5	BRI; 16	RCH; 11	KAN; 32	DAR; 1	COA; 5	CLT; 35	TEX; 35	NSH; 14	POC; 3	KNX; 35	GLN; 3	GTW; 1*	DAR; 1*	BRI; 19*	LVS; 36	TAL; 12	MAR; 9	PHO; 4		5th	2323

=== Truck No. 21 history ===
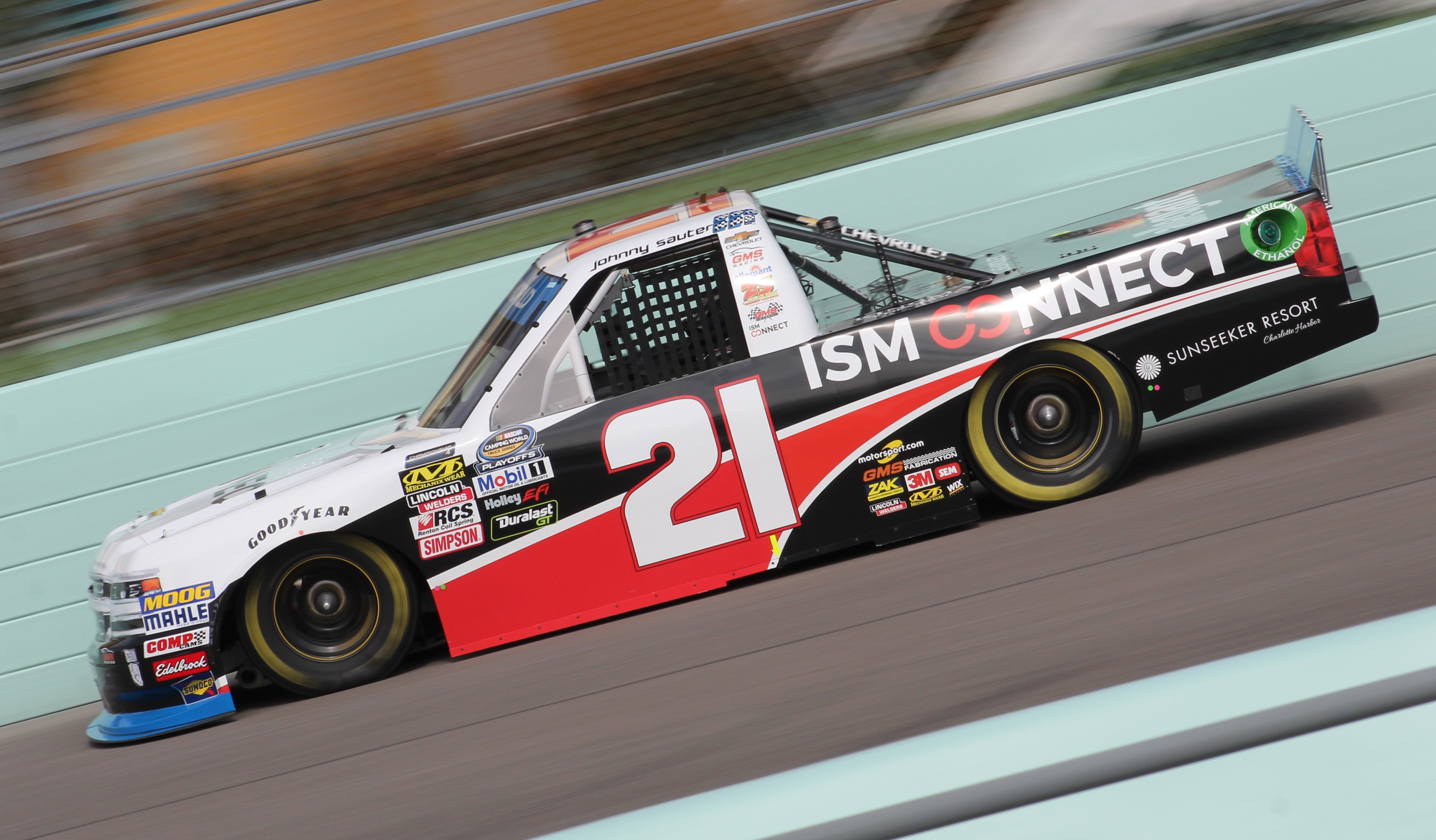
Johnny Sauter in the No. 21 at Homestead–Miami Speedway in 2018

The No. 21 truck made five attempts in 2013 with Spencer Gallagher as the driver, qualifying for three races. Gallagher finished 22nd at Kansas, 20th at Texas, and 32nd in the season finale at Homestead.

Joey Coulter (2014)

In January 2014, it was announced that 23-year-old Joey Coulter would drive the No. 21 Silverado full-time for GMS Racing after competing in Toyotas during the 2013 season for Kyle Busch Motorsports and Joe Gibbs Racing. GMS also announced a technical alliance with RCR, the team Coulter had driven for in 2011 and 2012, where he secured a win at Pocono. Jeff Stankiewicz was named as the crew chief. Coulter earned three top 5s and ten top 10s, finishing 7th in the points standings.

Part-time (2015)

Due to a lack of sponsorship, Joey Coulter did not return to the driver's seat in 2015. Instead, he transitioned into the role of team relationships coordinator for GMS Racing. In October, at Las Vegas Motor Speedway, Brennan Poole made his series debut in the No. 21 truck, with sponsorship from DC Solar.

Johnny Sauter (2016–2018)

Johnny Sauter drove full-time in 2016 in the No. 21 Chevrolet Silverado with crew chief Marcus Richmond. Sauter won in his debut with GMS at Daytona. However, in the next three races, he finished 28th, 32nd, and 16th, respectively. Sauter won the fall race at Martinsville, clinching a spot in the Championship 4 race at Homestead. The following week, Sauter won the fall race at Texas, marking his third victory of the season. Sauter secured his first career Truck Series championship at Homestead, finishing third in the race.

Sauter returned to the team in 2017. After qualifying for the Championship 4 round in both 2017 and 2018, Sauter lost to Christopher Bell and Brett Moffitt in each respective year. Sauter was released from the team in 2019 due to a lack of sponsorship, making way for Brett Moffitt.

Part Time (2019)

It was later announced that Sam Mayer would drive the No. 21 on a part-time schedule towards the end of the 2019 season.

Zane Smith (2020–2021)

On November 19, 2019, it was announced that Zane Smith would drive a fourth full-time truck for the 2020 season, which was later revealed to be the No. 21. Smith had an outstanding rookie season with two wins, seven top fives, thirteen top tens, and a second-place finish in the points standings.

Smith returned to the team in 2021. He made it to the Championship 4 again after winning at Martinsville. He finished second in the standings again. Smith moved to the Front Row Motorsports No. 38 truck in 2022, and the No. 21 truck was subsequently shut down.

==== Truck No. 21 results ====
Year	Driver	No.	Make	1	2	3	4	5	6	7	8	9	10	11	12	13	14	15	16	17	18	19	20	21	22	23	Owners	Pts
2013	Spencer Gallagher	21	Chevy	DAY	MAR	CAR; DNQ	KAN; 22	CLT	DOV	TEX	KEN	IOW	ELD	POC	MCH	BRI	MSP	IOW	CHI	LVS	TAL	MAR; DNQ	TEX; 20	PHO	HOM; 32		46th	58
2014	Joey Coulter	21	Chevy	DAY; 32	MAR; 17	KAN; 12	CLT; 12	DOV; 5	TEX; 9	GTW; 11	KEN; 12	IOW; 4	ELD; 14	POC; 3	MCH; 9	BRI; 7	MSP; 13	CHI; 8	NHA; 9	LVS; 10	TAL; 13	MAR; 30	TEX; 6	PHO; 30	HOM; 23		11th	680
2015	Brennan Poole	21	Chevy	DAY	ATL	MAR	KAN	CLT	DOV	TEX	GTW	IOW	KEN	ELD	POC	MCH	BRI	MSP	CHI	NHA	LVS; 11	TAL	MAR	TEX	PHO	HOM	48th	33
2016	Johnny Sauter	21	Chevy	DAY; 1	ATL; 28	MAR; 32	KAN; 16	DOV; 4	CLT; 3	TEX; 3	IOW; 10	GTW; 4	KEN; 5	ELD; 13	POC; 8	BRI; 5	MCH; 9	MSP; 7	CHI; 5	NHA; 10	LVS; 7	TAL; 7	MAR; 1	TEX; 1	PHO; 2	HOM; 3	1st	4030
2017	Johnny Sauter	21	Chevy	DAY; 15*	ATL; 3	MAR; 2	KAN; 2	CLT; 2	DOV; 1	TEX; 8	GTW; 3	IOW; 2	KEN; 9	ELD; 23	POC; 5	MCH; 18	BRI; 6	MSP; 6	CHI; 1	NHA; 9	LVS; 10	TAL; 12*	MAR; 3	TEX; 1	PHO; 1	HOM; 3	2nd	4034
2018	Johnny Sauter	21	Chevy	DAY; 1*	ATL; 3	LVS; 2	MAR; 19	DOV; 1*	KAN; 5	CLT; 1*	TEX; 1	IOW; 5	GTW; 3	CHI; 3	KEN; 15	ELD; 16	POC; 8	MCH; 2	BRI; 1	MSP; 6	LVS; 2	TAL; 22	MAR; 1*	TEX; 11	PHO; 7	HOM; 12	4th	4025
2019	Sam Mayer	21	Chevy	DAY	ATL	LVS	MAR	TEX	DOV	KAN	CLT	TEX	IOW	GTW	CHI	KEN	POC	ELD	MCH	BRI; 21	MSP	LVS	TAL	MAR; 28	PHO; 19	HOM	45th	54
2020	Zane Smith	21	Chevy	DAY; 11	LVS; 6	CLT; 3	ATL; 5	HOM; 37	POC; 14	KEN; 7	TEX; 19	KAN; 6	KAN; 9*	MCH; 1	DAY; 13	DOV; 1*	GTW; 7	DAR; 16	RCH; 11	BRI; 16	LVS; 7	TAL; 33	KAN; 11	TEX; 3	MAR; 3	PHO; 2	2nd	4035
2021	Zane Smith	21	Chevy	DAY; 16	DAY; 40	LVS; 6	ATL; 6	BRI; 7	RCH; 14	KAN; 7	DAR; 16	COA; 8	CLT; 10	TEX; 6	NSH; 4	POC; 8	KNX; 14	GLN; 6	GTW; 35	DAR; 9	BRI; 8	LVS; 29	TAL; 33	MAR; 1	PHO; 5		2nd	4032

=== Truck No. 23 history ===
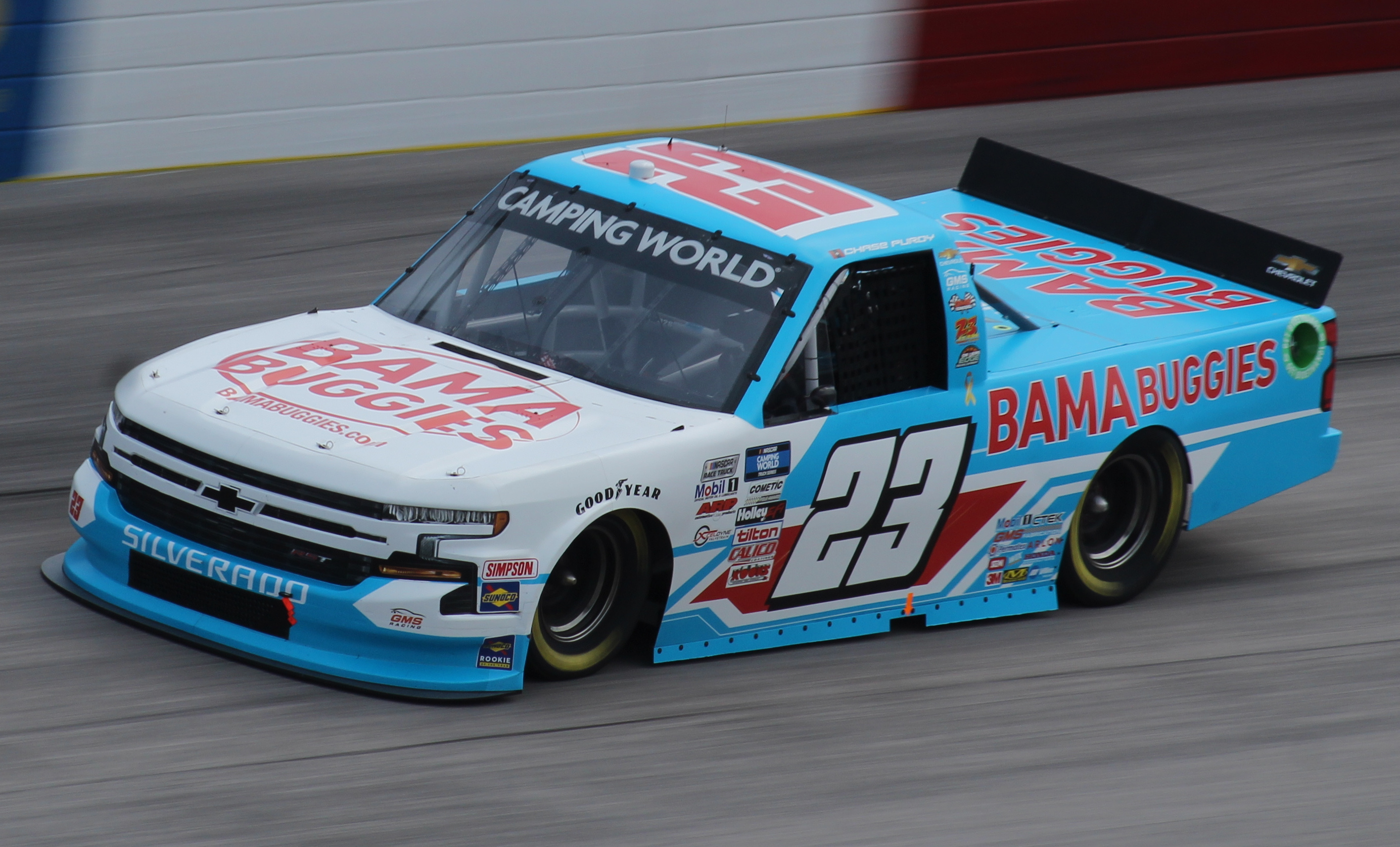
Chase Purdy in the No. 23 at Darlington Raceway in 2021

Spencer Gallagher (2014–2016)

The No. 23 truck ran part-time in 2014, with Spencer Gallagher (9 races) and Max Gresham (5 races). The team struggled in their first three races, with crashes at Martinsville and Kansas involving Gallagher, and a transmission failure with Gresham at Charlotte. They bounced back with an 11th-place finish at Kentucky with Gresham and top-15 finishes at Iowa, Pocono, and Michigan with Gallagher. Gallagher earned a career-best finish of third at Talladega in October.

In a 2014 interview with NASCAR.com, Spencer Gallagher stated that he planned to run full-time in the Truck Series in 2015, presumably in the No. 23. The No. 23 truck was announced as a full-time team with Gallagher in January 2015. He went on to finish 10th in the points standings that season.

Gallagher returned for 2016 with new crew chief Jeff Hensley. He earned two poles, with one top-five and eight top-10 finishes, ultimately finishing 12th in the points standings.

Part-time (2017–2018)

In 2017, the No. 23 truck returned to the track on a part-time basis, with Spencer Gallagher and Chase Elliott sharing driving duties. At Martinsville, Elliott secured the first win for the No. 23 truck. Following this victory, the No. 23 team decided to shut down for the remainder of the season and sold their owner points to Norm Benning Racing.

A year later, in 2018, the No. 23 team returned with Timothy Peters driving at Martinsville, where he earned a top-10 finish.

Brett Moffitt (2020)

On December 13, 2019, it was announced that Brett Moffitt would drive the No. 23 truck full-time in 2020, with Chad Norris as his crew chief. Despite securing only one win throughout the season, Moffitt advanced to the Championship 4. He was leading the championship race at Phoenix Raceway when a caution for Dawson Cram occurred, causing Moffitt to fall back and finish 10th.

Chase Purdy (2021)

In 2021, Chase Purdy drove the No. 23 full-time, replacing Brett Moffitt. On August 5, 2021, Purdy tested positive for COVID-19, and A. J. Allmendinger stepped in as his replacement for the race at Watkins Glen.

Grant Enfinger (2022–2023)

On October 1, 2021, it was announced that Grant Enfinger would drive the No. 23 truck full-time in the 2022 and 2023 seasons.

Enfinger began the 2022 season with a 29th-place finish at Daytona. He scored three top-fives and seven top-10 finishes to make the playoffs. During the playoffs, Enfinger earned his first win of the season at Indianapolis Raceway Park.

Enfinger started the 2023 season with a fifth-place finish at Daytona. He secured wins at Kansas, Gateway, and the Milwaukee Mile. Enfinger finished fourth at Homestead to advance to the Championship 4. He finished sixth at Phoenix and second in the final points standings.

==== Truck No. 23 results ====
Year	Driver	No.	Make	1	2	3	4	5	6	7	8	9	10	11	12	13	14	15	16	17	18	19	20	21	22	23	Owners	Pts
2014	Spencer Gallagher	23	Chevy	DAY	MAR; 32	KAN; 30		DOV	TEX	GTW		IOW; 11	ELD	POC; 15	MCH; 13		MSP	CHI	NHA	LVS; 13	TAL; 3			PHO; 31	HOM; 14		26th	371
2014	Max Gresham	23	Chevy				CLT; 31				KEN; 11					BRI; 12						MAR; 22	TEX; 7				26th	371
2015	Spencer Gallagher	23	Chevy	DAY; 21	ATL; 13	MAR; 14	KAN; 17	CLT; 10	DOV; 12	TEX; 12	GTW; 2	IOW; 7	KEN; 24	ELD; 17	POC; 14	MCH; 16	BRI; 22	MSP; 8	CHI; 8	NHA; 28	LVS; 15	TAL; 18	MAR; 29	TEX; 12	PHO; 6	HOM; 11	15th	677
2016	Spencer Gallagher	23	Chevy	DAY; 21	ATL; 10	MAR; 6	KAN; 10	DOV; 6	CLT; 6	TEX; 27	IOW; 13	GTW; 22	KEN; 16	ELD; 29	POC; 15	BRI; 12	MCH; 25	MSP; 22	CHI; 7	NHA; 14	LVS; 11	TAL; 2	MAR; 29	TEX; 7*	PHO; 32	HOM; 21	15th	402
2017	Spencer Gallagher	23	Chevy	DAY; 13																							33rd	113
2017	Chase Elliott	23	Chevy		ATL; 5	MAR; 1	KAN	CLT	DOV	TEX	GTW	IOW	KEN	ELD	POC	MCH	BRI	MSP	CHI	NHA	LVS	TAL	MAR	TEX	PHO	HOM	33rd	113
2018	Timothy Peters	23	Chevy	DAY	ATL	LVS	MAR	DOV	KAN	CLT	TEX	IOW	GTW	CHI	KEN	ELD	POC	MCH	BRI	MSP	LVS	TAL	MAR; 10	TEX	PHO	HOM	49th	34
2020	Brett Moffitt	23	Chevy	DAY; 13	LVS; 16	CLT; 4	ATL; 8	HOM; 36	POC; 7	KEN; 11*	TEX; 5	KAN; 2	KAN; 27	MCH; 6	DAY; 2	DOV; 3*	GTW; 2	DAR; 10	RCH; 4	BRI; 2*	LVS; 15	TAL; 7	KAN; 1	TEX; 5	MAR; 28	PHO; 10*	3rd	4027
2021	Chase Purdy	23	Chevy	DAY; 29	DAY; 22	LVS; 23	ATL; 24	BRI; 18	RCH; 28	KAN; 25	DAR; 36	COA; 27	CLT; 34	TEX; 17	NSH; 15	POC; 15	KNX; 33		GTW; 6	DAR; 15	BRI; 30	LVS; 13	TAL; 9	MAR; 40	PHO; 16		22nd	334
2021	A. J. Allmendinger	23	Chevy															GLN; 27									22nd	334
2022	Grant Enfinger	23	Chevy	DAY; 29	LVS; 23	ATL; 12	COA; 10	MAR; 8	BRI; 8	DAR; 3	KAN; 3	TEX; 11	CLT; 2	GTW; 28	SON; 11	KNX; 8	NSH; 32	MOH; 11	POC; 17	IRP; 1	RCH; 4	KAN; 5	BRI; 4	TAL; 29	HOM; 14	PHO; 6	11th	706
2023	Grant Enfinger	23	Chevy	DAY; 5	LVS; 9	ATL; 19	COA; 12	TEX; 17	BRD; 5	MAR; 14	KAN; 1*	DAR; 14	NWS; 10	CLT; 5	GTW; 1*	NSH; 13	MOH; 11	POC; 5	RCH; 9	IRP; 12	MLW; 1*	KAN; 17	BRI; 3	TAL; 13	HOM; 4	PHO; 6	2nd	4031

=== Truck No. 24 history ===
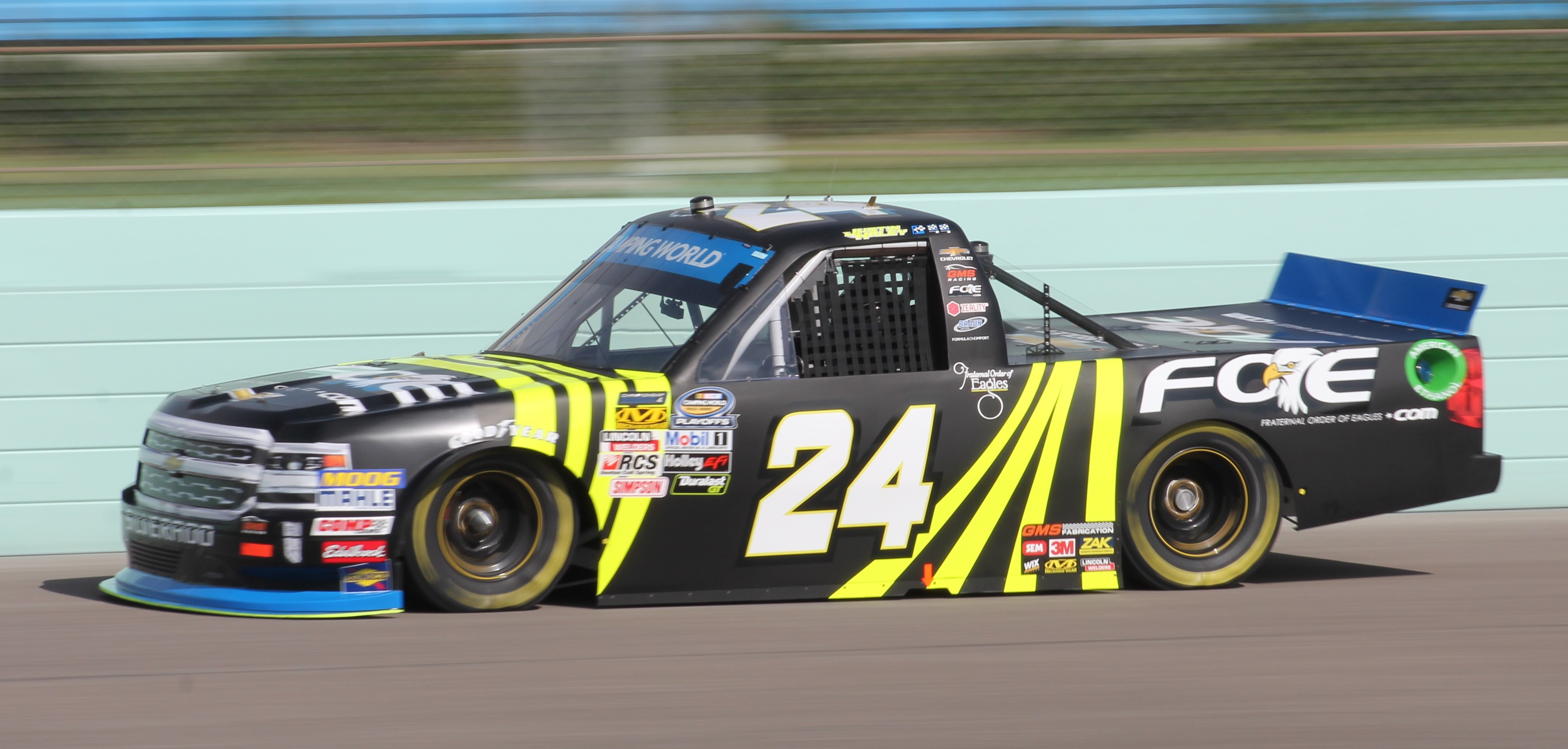
Justin Haley in the No. 24 at Homestead–Miami Speedway in 2018

Part-time (2016)

In 2016, GMS Racing fielded the No. 24 for Kyle Larson at Martinsville, with sponsorship from McDonald's. Clint Bowyer drove the No. 24 at Kansas with sponsorship from Georgia Boot, finishing 5th in his first truck start since 2014. Ben Kennedy drove the truck at Dover as part of his multi-race stint with the team, with Kaz Grala in the No. 33. Grala then drove the truck at Iowa in June, starting fourth and finishing 29th. Grant Enfinger also ran several races. On October 22, Enfinger won the Fred's 250 at Talladega Superspeedway for his first career win. Shane Lee drove the No. 24 at Texas with sponsorship from LeeBoy, finishing 16th. Grala ran seven races in the No. 24 out of his nine Truck Series starts, with a best finish of seventh at New Hampshire. Justin Haley returned to this truck at Texas.

Justin Haley (2017–2018)

In December 2016, GMS Racing announced that K&N Pro Series East champion Justin Haley would drive the No. 24 truck full-time in 2017, though he would skip the Daytona and Atlanta races due to age restrictions. Scott Lagasse Jr. drove the truck at Daytona, and Alex Bowman drove at Atlanta. Haley finished 12th in the points standings, collecting 3 top fives and 12 top tens.

Haley won his first Truck Series race at Gateway in 2018, holding off Todd Gilliland and teammate Johnny Sauter, and qualified for the 2018 Camping World Truck Series Playoffs.

He advanced to the Round of 6 at Canadian Tire Motorsport Park after Noah Gragson and Todd Gilliland collided in the final corner. Haley then qualified for the Final 4 race with a win at Texas Motor Speedway, after Gilliland ran out of fuel on the final lap.

Brett Moffitt (2019)

On January 10, 2019, GMS Racing announced that 2018 NASCAR Camping World Truck Series champion Brett Moffitt would be driving for the No. 24 team. Moffitt won his first race with GMS at Iowa Speedway after Ross Chastain was disqualified when his truck failed the post-race inspection. He then won at Chicagoland Speedway with an unsponsored truck. Moffitt scored his first playoff win at Bristol Motor Speedway and won again the following week at Canadian Tire Motorsport Park.

Multiple drivers (2020–2021)

On October 25, 2019, it was announced that the No. 24 truck would be driven by Sam Mayer for five races. On January 10, 2020, it was announced that Mayer would share the ride with World of Outlaws driver David Gravel, who would drive in six races, with Eldora being the only one confirmed at that time. Chase Elliott was also announced to drive for the team at Charlotte, Atlanta, and Homestead. Chase Purdy was scheduled to drive the No. 24 at Pocono Raceway, Kentucky Speedway, both Kansas Speedway events, Las Vegas Motor Speedway, Talladega Superspeedway, and Texas Motor Speedway. Justin Haley returned to the No. 24 truck at Texas. Kris Wright drove the truck at the Daytona International Speedway road course. Greg Biffle made a one-off start in the No. 24 at Darlington Raceway.

On January 7, 2021, it was announced that Raphaël Lessard would drive the No. 24 truck full-time for the 2021 season. On April 3, 2021, it was announced that Lessard would no longer run for GMS Racing due to a lack of sponsorship. Ryan Reed drove at Darlington, Jack Wood drove at Circuit of the Americas and Charlotte, and Chase Elliott returned to the team in Texas. On June 10, 2021, it was announced that Wood would pilot the No. 24 truck for the remainder of the 2021 season. Six-time Whelen Modified Tour champion Doug Coby made a one-off start at Bristol Motor Speedway.

Jack Wood (2021–2022)

After driving the No. 24 truck for 12 races in 2021, it was announced that Jack Wood would drive the truck full-time in the 2022 NASCAR Camping World Truck Series.

Rajah Caruth (2023)

On December 6, 2022, GMS announced that Rajah Caruth would replace Jack Wood for the 2023 season.

==== Truck No. 24 results ====
Year	Driver	No.	Make	1	2	3	4	5	6	7	8	9	10	11	12	13	14	15	16	17	18	19	20	21	22	23	NCWTC	Pts
2016	Kyle Larson	24	Chevy	DAY	ATL	MAR; 4								ELD; 1	POC											HOM; 4*	14th	402
2016	Clint Bowyer	24	Chevy				KAN; 5																				14th	402
2016	Ben Kennedy	24	Chevy					DOV; 13	CLT	TEX																	14th	402
2016	Kaz Grala	24	Chevy								IOW; 29	GTW; 8				BRI; 11		MSP; 26		NHA; 7			MAR; 15		PHO; 28		14th	402
2016	Grant Enfinger	24	Chevy										KEN; 12				MCH; 8		CHI; 6		LVS; 10	TAL; 1*					14th	402
2016	Shane Lee	24	Chevy																					TEX; 16			14th	402
2017	Scott Lagasse Jr.	24	Chevy	DAY; 7																							8th	2204
2017	Alex Bowman	24	Chevy		ATL; 6																						8th	2204
2017	Justin Haley	24	Chevy			MAR; 26	KAN; 9	CLT; 17	DOV; 8	TEX; 6	GTW; 10	IOW; 10	KEN; 3	ELD; 8	POC; 10	MCH; 10	BRI; 11	MSP; 4	CHI; 14	NHA; 13	LVS; 21	TAL; 16	MAR; 11	TEX; 5	PHO; 14	HOM; 9	8th	2204
2018	Justin Haley	24	Chevy	DAY; 2	ATL; 22	LVS; 28	MAR; 10	DOV; 3	KAN; 10	CLT; 14	TEX; 3	IOW; 16	GTW; 1	CHI; 6	KEN; 10	ELD; 9	POC; 5	MCH; 9	BRI; 6	MSP; 1	LVS; 3	TAL; 4	MAR; 6	TEX; 1	PHO; 28	HOM; 8	3rd	4029
2019	Brett Moffitt	24	Chevy	DAY; 26	ATL; 4	LVS; 2	MAR; 3	TEX; 19	DOV; 2*	KAN; 8	CLT; 19	TEX; 11	IOW; 1	GTW; 5	CHI; 1*	KEN; 7	POC; 5	ELD; 29	MCH; 4	BRI; 1	MSP; 1*	LVS; 7	TAL; 4	MAR; 29	PHO; 10	HOM; 5	3rd	4032
2020	Chase Elliott	24	Chevy	DAY	LVS	CLT; 1*	ATL; 20	HOM; 4																			16th	520
2020	Chase Purdy	24	Chevy						POC; 21	KEN; 31		KAN; 15	KAN; 10								LVS; 27	TAL; 32		TEX; 12			16th	520
2020	Justin Haley	24	Chevy								TEX; 7																16th	520
2020	David Gravel	24	Chevy											MCH; 10									KAN; 35				16th	520
2020	Kris Wright	24	Chevy												DAY; 25												16th	520
2020	Sam Mayer	24	Chevy													DOV; 15	GTW; 4		RCH; 19	BRI; 1					MAR; 18	PHO; 17	16th	520
2020	Greg Biffle	24	Chevy															DAR; 19									16th	520
2021	Raphaël Lessard	24	Chevy	DAY; 23	DAY; 26	LVS; 30	ATL; 39	BRI; 3	RCH; 23	KAN; 8																	18th	390
2021	Ryan Reed	24	Chevy								DAR; 12																18th	390
2021	Jack Wood	24	Chevy									COA; 28	CLT; 15		NSH; 11	POC; 39	KNX; 39	GLN; 25	GTW; 10	DAR; 30		LVS; 30	TAL; 40	MAR; 27	PHO; 20		18th	390
2021	Chase Elliott	24	Chevy											TEX; 2													18th	390
2021	Doug Coby	24	Chevy																		BRI; 12						18th	390
2022	Jack Wood	24	Chevy	DAY; 33	LVS; 32	ATL; 13	COA; 32	MAR; 35	BRI; 22	DAR; 17	KAN; 26	TEX; 16	CLT; 23	GTW; 19	SON; 16	KNX; 21	NSH; 35	MOH; 29	POC; 35	IRP; 25	RCH; 23	KAN; 26	BRI; 21	TAL; 19	HOM; 31	PHO; 29	27th	279
2023	Rajah Caruth	24	Chevy	DAY; 29	LVS; 29	ATL; 25	COA; 13	TEX; 19	BRD; 11	MAR; 25	KAN; 34	DAR; 6	NWS; 34	CLT; 11	GTW; 15	NSH; 32	MOH; 29	POC; 16	RCH; 19	IRP; 7	MLW; 14	KAN; 12	BRI; 6	TAL; 12	HOM; 8	PHO; 12	18th	482

=== Truck No. 25 history ===
Dalton Sargeant (2018)

On January 12, 2018, Dalton Sargeant was announced as the driver for the No. 33 truck, now renumbered to No. 25. However, Sargeant was released due to sponsorship issues before the race at Mosport. Spencer Gallagher was initially announced as his replacement, but Gallagher sustained a shoulder injury and was replaced by Timothy Peters. Peters secured his 11th Truck Series win at Talladega.

On September 26, 2018, it was announced that Tyler Dippel would drive the final four races of the 2018 season.

==== Truck No. 25 results ====
Year	Driver	No.	Make	1	2	3	4	5	6	7	8	9	10	11	12	13	14	15	16	17	18	19	20	21	22	23	Owners	Pts
2018	Dalton Sargeant	25	Chevy	DAY; 8	ATL; 14	LVS; 6	MAR; 11	DOV; 13	KAN; 11	CLT; 19	TEX; 11	IOW; 19	GTW; 30	CHI; 20	KEN; 9	ELD; 27	POC; 3	MCH; 12	BRI; 11								13th	593
2018	Timothy Peters	25	Chevy																	MSP; 4	LVS; 19	TAL; 1					13th	593
2018	Tyler Dippel	25	Chevy																				MAR; 17	TEX; 14	PHO; 14	HOM; 15	13th	593

=== Truck No. 26 history ===
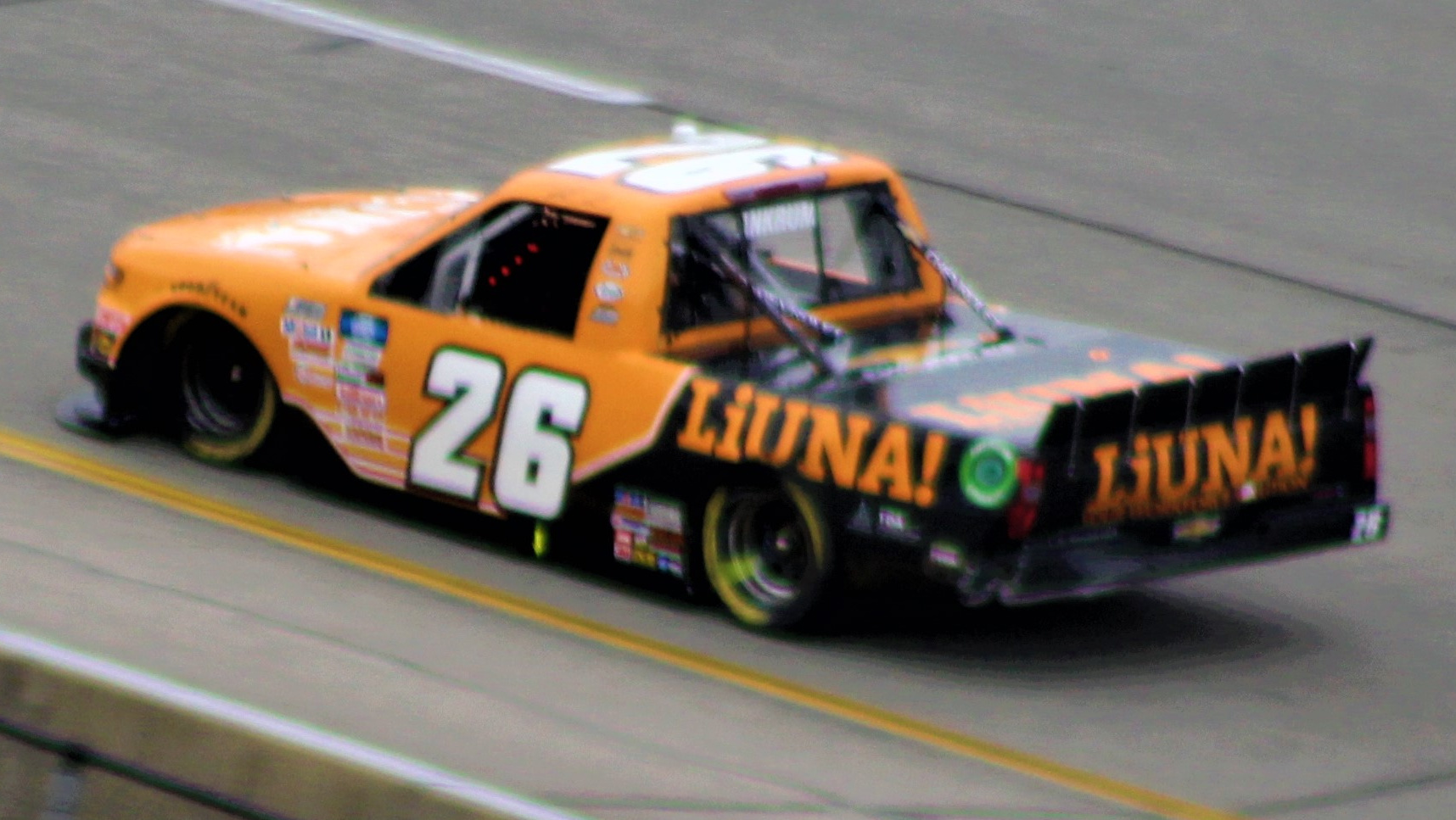
Tyler Ankrum in the No. 26 at Richmond Raceway in 2021

Tyler Ankrum (2020–2021)

On November 19, 2019, it was announced that the 2019 Rookie of the Year, Tyler Ankrum, would join GMS Racing to drive a third full-time truck, which was later revealed as the No. 26. On February 21, 2020, the No. 26 team was docked 10 owner and driver points before the Las Vegas race after an illegal engine oil reservoir tank was discovered during pre-race inspection.

Ankrum remained in the No. 26 for the 2021 NASCAR Camping World Truck Series season. He finished the 2021 season with 5 top-10 finishes and 1 pole. In 2022, Ankrum moved to the Hattori Racing Enterprises No. 16 truck, and the No. 26 team was shut down.

==== Truck No. 26 results ====
Year	Driver	No.	Make	1	2	3	4	5	6	7	8	9	10	11	12	13	14	15	16	17	18	19	20	21	22	23	Owners	Pts
2020	Tyler Ankrum	26	Chevy	DAY; 27	LVS; 11	CLT; 13	ATL; 15	HOM; 2	POC; 9	KEN; 16	TEX; 6	KAN; 33	KAN; 28	MCH; 4	DAY; 6	DOV; 7	GTW; 12	DAR; 11	RCH; 5	BRI; 7	LVS; 10	TAL; 16	KAN; 34	TEX; 16	MAR; 12	PHO; 8	10th	2196
2021	Tyler Ankrum	26	Chevy	DAY; 28	DAY; 21	LVS; 34	ATL; 18	BRI; 40	RCH; 3	KAN; 15	DAR; 14	COA; 3	CLT; 16	TEX; 8	NSH; 23	POC; 4	KNX; 17	GLN; 7	GTW; 32	DAR; 18	BRI; 32	LVS; 34	TAL; 28	MAR; 26	PHO; 14		16th	432

=== Truck No. 33 history ===
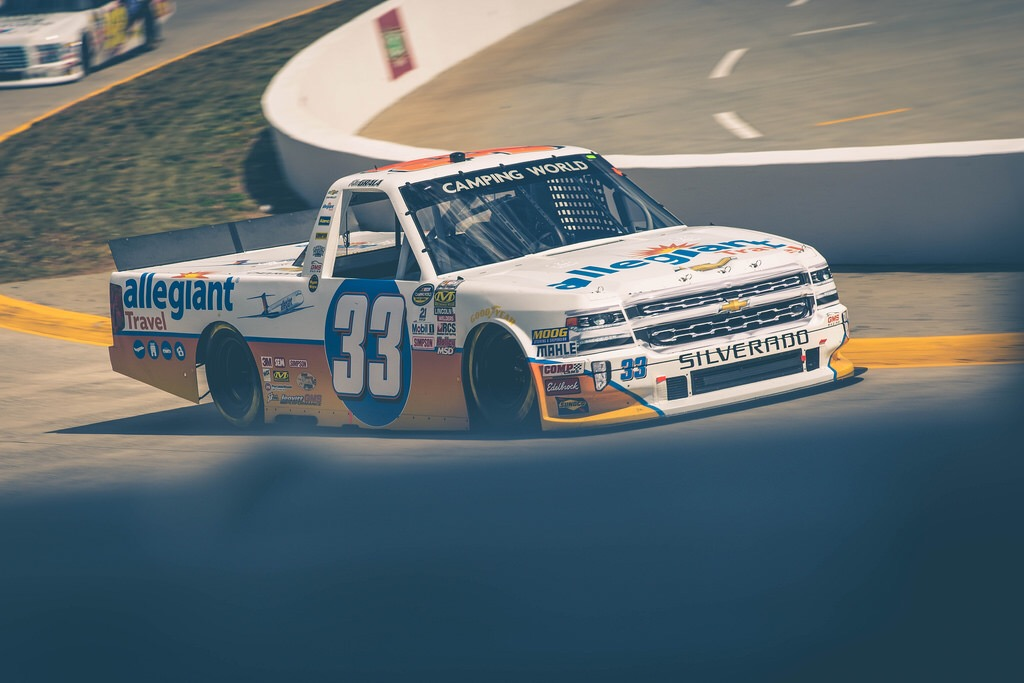
Kaz Grala at Martinsville in 2016.

Brandon Jones (2014–2015)

In October 2014, it was announced that 17-year-old K&N Pro Series East driver Brandon Jones, along with crew chief Shane Huffman and the No. 33 Truck team, would move from Turner Scott Motorsports—which was undergoing internal turmoil—to GMS Racing for the final two races of their partial schedule at Martinsville and Phoenix.

Jones returned to the No. 33 truck for 17 races in 2015, while Richard Childress Racing teammates Austin and Ty Dillon ran the remaining six races with sponsorship from Rheem. Austin Dillon won the race at New Hampshire, securing GMS Racing's first Truck Series victory.

Multiple drivers (2016)

Grant Enfinger was promoted from the ARCA Racing Series to GMS Racing, driving part-time in the No. 33 Chevrolet Silverado for the team in 2016. Seventeen-year-old Kaz Grala also drove the No. 33 in select races, beginning at Martinsville. On April 25, 2016, it was announced that Ben Kennedy would drive the No. 33 for 10 races, starting at Kansas. Kennedy scored his first career win at Bristol Motor Speedway in August, securing a spot in the NASCAR Truck Series Playoffs. Kennedy was eliminated in the Round of 6 after Phoenix and finished 7th in the final points standings.

Kaz Grala (2017)

On December 5, 2016, it was announced that Kaz Grala would drive the No. 33 truck full-time for the 2017 season, with new crew chief Jerry Baxter, who had previously worked with Kyle Busch Motorsports.

On February 24, 2017, Grala won his first race in the No. 33 truck at Daytona International Speedway after avoiding a last-lap wreck in the NextEra Energy Resources 250.

==== Truck No. 33 results ====
Year	Driver	No.	Make	1	2	3	4	5	6	7	8	9	10	11	12	13	14	15	16	17	18	19	20	21	22	23	Owners	Pts
2014	Brandon Jones	33	Chevy	DAY	MAR	KAN	CLT	DOV	TEX	GTW	KEN	IOW	ELD	POC	MCH	BRI	MSP	CHI	NHA	LVS	TAL	MAR; 32	TEX	PHO; 12	HOM			
2015	Ty Dillon	33	Chevy	DAY; 11	ATL; 2									ELD; 10													12th	719
2015	Brandon Jones	33	Chevy			MAR; 15	KAN; 30	CLT; 13	DOV; 8	TEX; 22	GTW; 12	IOW; 2	KEN; 10				BRI; 5	MSP; 26	CHI; 17		LVS; 5	TAL; 2	MAR; 7	TEX; 7	PHO; 32	HOM; 31	12th	719
2015	Austin Dillon	33	Chevy												POC; 5	MCH; 5				NHA; 1*							12th	719
2016	Grant Enfinger	33	Chevy	DAY; 20	ATL; 5																						6th	2162
2016	Kaz Grala	33	Chevy			MAR; 31		DOV; 10																			6th	2162
2016	Ben Kennedy	33	Chevy				KAN; 9		CLT; 14	TEX; 4	IOW; 7	GTW; 9	KEN; 22	ELD; 11	POC; 7	BRI; 1	MCH; 11	MSP; 8	CHI; 26	NHA; 11	LVS; 4	TAL; 5	MAR; 18	TEX; 13	PHO; 9	HOM; 14	6th	2162
2017	Kaz Grala	33	Chevy	DAY; 1	ATL; 15	MAR; 15	KAN; 8	CLT; 30	DOV; 2	TEX; 10	GTW; 13	IOW; 24	KEN; 24	ELD; 31	POC; 23	MCH; 12	BRI; 28	MSP; 3	CHI; 9	NHA; 10	LVS; 5	TAL; 29	MAR; 7	TEX; 6	PHO; 5	HOM; 13	6th	2214

=== Truck No. 43 history ===
Daniel Dye (2023)

On October 25, 2022, it was announced that Daniel Dye would race full-time for GMS Racing in 2023, driving the new No. 43 entry. Following the closure of GMS Racing, the No. 43's points were sold to Freedom Racing Enterprises and transferred to the No. 76 truck.

==== Truck No. 43 results ====
Year	Driver	No.	Make	1	2	3	4	5	6	7	8	9	10	11	12	13	14	15	16	17	18	19	20	21	22	23	Owners	Pts
2023	Daniel Dye	43	Chevy	DAY; 30	LVS; 19	ATL; 16	COA; 18	TEX; 25	BRD; 22	MAR; 30	KAN; 13	DAR; 19	NWS; 14	CLT; 19	GTW; 11	NSH; 22	MOH; 14	POC; 17	RCH; 21	IRP; 22	MLW; 28	KAN; 23	BRI; 21	TAL; 6	HOM; 21	PHO; 32	21st	389

== ARCA Menards Series ==
=== Car No. 20 history ===
The No. 20 car ran two ARCA Menards Series events in 2014. The first was with Spencer Gallagher at Daytona, replacing Scott Sheldon after Gallagher's No. 23 car was disqualified. Sheldon then ran the car at Talladega, finishing 13th.

In 2015, Scott Sheldon ran the No. 20 car at Daytona International Speedway and Talladega Superspeedway. Following these events, the team shut down.

=== Car No. 21 history ===
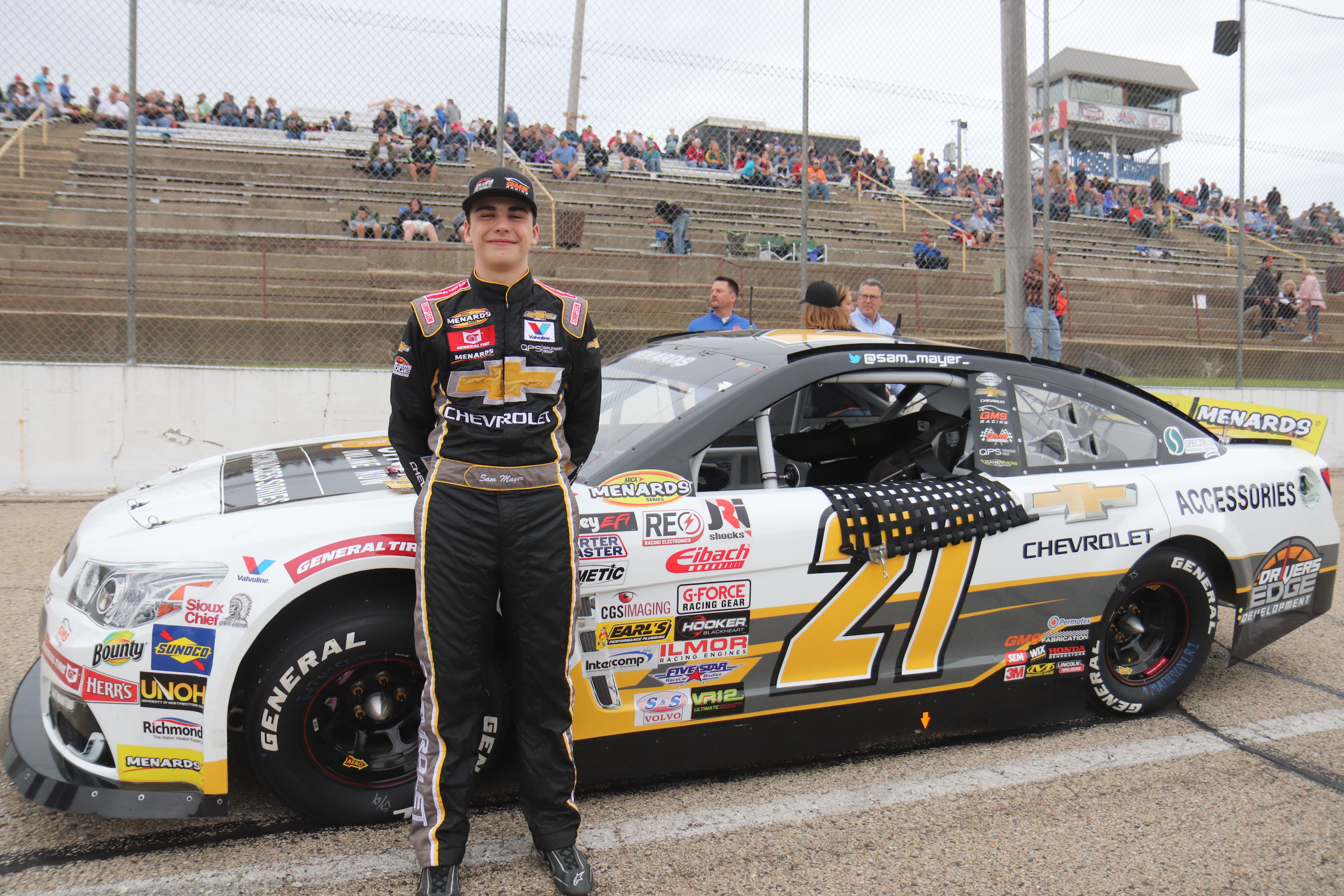
Mayer beside No. 21 at Madison International Speedway

In 2019, GMS Racing returned to ARCA, running 15-year-old Sam Mayer in a part-time schedule. Mayer also competed in the full season of the K&N Pro Series East with the team, ultimately winning the series championship.

In 2020, Mayer returned for another part-time ARCA schedule, winning five races and finishing 7th in the standings.

In 2021, Jack Wood drove the No. 21 car for six races, while Daniel Dye also drove it for six races. Dye won once at Berlin Raceway, securing his first-ever ARCA Menards Series win in just his second start in the series. Kody Swanson made one start in the No. 21 car at Salem Speedway.

In 2022, Wood returned for one race at Mid-Ohio in the No. 21 car. This time, the car was prepared by Bill McAnally Racing and was a Toyota, rather than the usual Chevrolet.

=== Car No. 22 history ===
In 2021, GMS Racing fielded the No. 22 for Jack Wood in a one-off event at Bristol.

=== Car No. 23 history ===
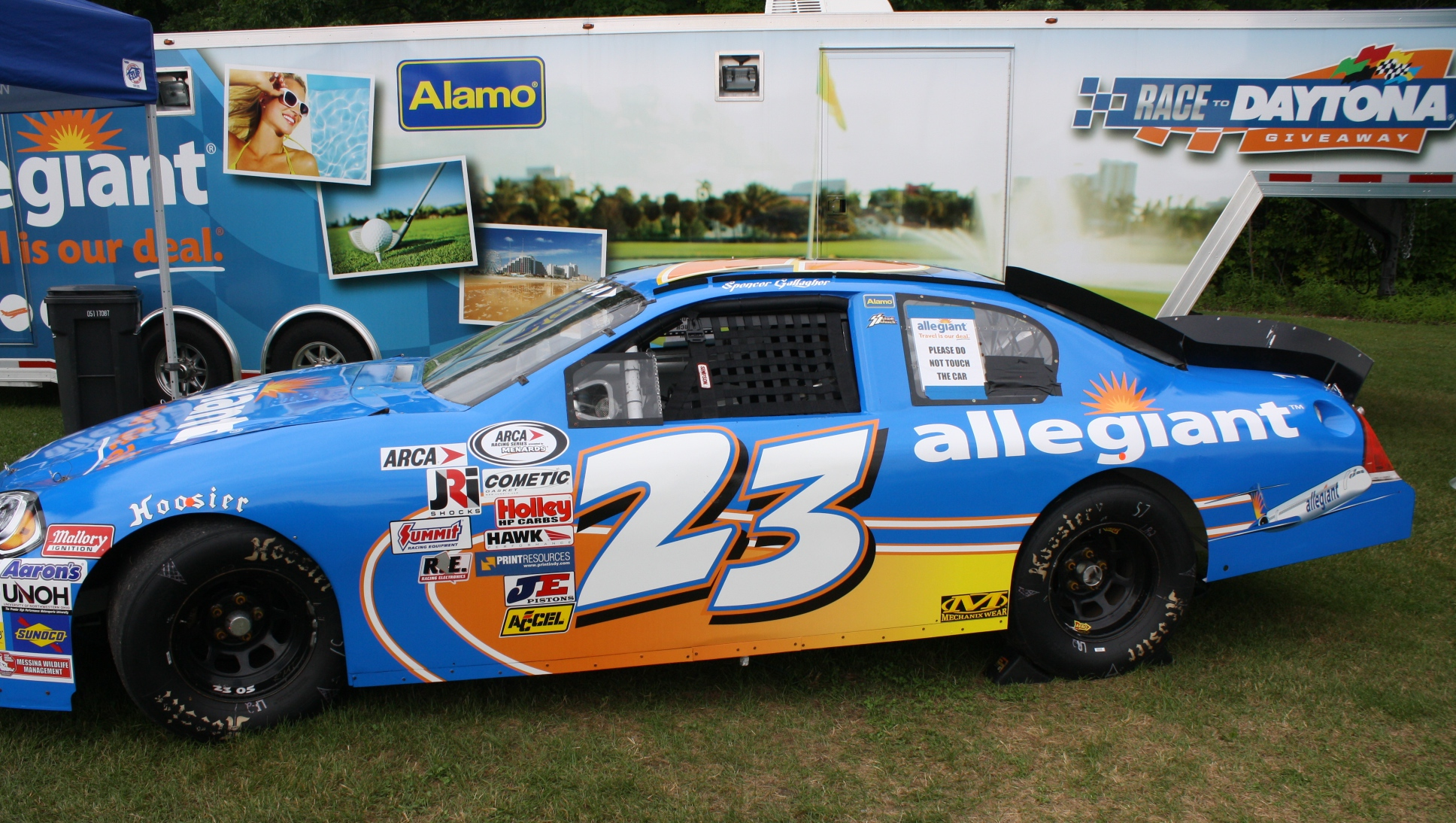
Spencer Gallagher's 2013 ARCA car on display at Road America

Spencer Gallagher (2011–2014)

Spencer Gallagher ran three races in 2011 in a car numbered 05, with a best finish of 15th. Gallagher ran the full 19-race schedule in 2012, scoring six top-tens and finishing 7th in points. Gallagher's performance improved in 2013, with five top-5s and eight top-10s, though he missed two races and finished 10th in points. Josh Williams replaced Gallagher at Winchester Speedway.

Gallagher returned for 2014, sponsored by Allegiant and Alamo Rent a Car. In October 2014, he earned his first win in the 20th and final race of the ARCA season, the ARCA 98.9 at Kansas Speedway. Gallagher started 32nd and led the final 32 laps of the race.

Grant Enfinger (2015)

For 2015, Grant Enfinger moved from the No. 90 car to the No. 23 for the full season, pending sponsorship. Enfinger had worked in the GMS shop during the off-season. Enfinger won the season opener at Daytona International Speedway, marking his second consecutive victory at the track. Enfinger went on to win a total of six races, ultimately securing the championship.

Bret Holmes Racing (2016–present)

Following the 2015 season, the equipment of the No. 23 team was sold to Bret Holmes Racing, with Grant Enfinger serving as crew chief and part-time driver. The effort was supported by GMS. Enfinger scored a victory at Pocono in 2016 in the car.

=== Car No. 43 history ===
For 2022, GMS announced that Daniel Dye would drive the No. 21 car full-time in the main ARCA Series. However, after GMS merged with Richard Petty Motorsports, Dye moved to the new No. 43 car.

=== Car No. 90 history ===
Prior to the race at Lucas Oil Raceway in July, it was announced that four-time winner in 2014, Grant Enfinger, who was second in points at the time, would be moving from Team BCR's Ford to GMS Racing, taking his No. 90 and sponsor Motor Honey with him. GMS partner Allegiant Travel provided additional sponsorship. Enfinger finished 4th in his first race for GMS but crashed at Pocono with Frank Kimmel. In the next race at Berlin Raceway, Enfinger dominated, leading 181 of 200 laps to win the Federated Auto Parts 200 and moved within 25 points of the points leader Mason Mitchell. Enfinger scored his sixth win of the season at the DuQuoin State Fairgrounds Racetrack in September, leading 63 of 100 laps, and earned the Bill France Four Crown award for the season. He ultimately finished second to Mason Mitchell (who had only one win) after two DNFs in the final two races of the season. The team shut down following the 2020 season.

== ARCA Menards Series East ==
=== Car No. 21 history ===
For 2019, Sam Mayer ran the full K&N Pro Series East season in the No. 21 car and won the series championship.

In 2020, Mayer returned for another full season in the rebranded ARCA Menards Series East. He won 5 out of 6 races and claimed another championship.

In 2021, Jack Wood was scheduled to run the full ARCA East season, but he only competed in one race, the season opener at New Smyrna Speedway. Conner Jones made one start at Fairgrounds Speedway. Daniel Dye drove the No. 21 car for the last 4 races of the season. The No. 21 car was replaced by the No. 43 for the 2022 season.

=== Car No. 22 history ===
In 2021, GMS fielded the No. 22 car for Jack Wood in a one-off at the season finale at Bristol.

=== Car No. 43 history ===
In 2022, GMS fielded the No. 43 car for Daniel Dye at Iowa Speedway, Milwaukee Mile, and Bristol Motor Speedway.

== ARCA Menards Series West ==
=== Car No. 21 history ===
In 2019, GMS fielded the No. 21 car at the K&N Pro Series West season finale at Phoenix Raceway for Sam Mayer. He won the pole and finished 2nd.

In 2020, Mayer returned to the rebranded ARCA Menards Series West for 2 races, including one at Las Vegas Motor Speedway, where he won.

In 2021, Jack Wood drove the No. 21 car at Phoenix Raceway.

In 2022, Wood returned for one race at Sonoma Raceway. This time, the car was prepared by Bill McAnally Racing and was a Toyota instead of its usual Chevrolet.

=== Car No. 22 history ===
In 2021, GMS fielded the No. 22 car for Daniel Dye at the season finale at Phoenix Raceway. The team would shut down following that event.

=== Car No. 43 history ===
In 2022, GMS fielded the No. 43 car for Daniel Dye at Phoenix. The No. 43 car made a return later in the season at Portland, also driven by Dye. For this race, the car was prepared by Bill McAnally Racing.
