= 2016 TreatMyClot.com 300 =

Fifth race of the 2016 NASCAR Xfinity Series

2016 TreatMyClot.com 300 by Janssen
Race details
- Race 5 of 33 in the 2016 NASCAR Xfinity Series
- Date: March 19, 2016
- Official name: 18th Annual TreatMyClot.com 300 by Janssen
- Location: Fontana, California, Auto Club Speedway
- Course: Permanent racing facility
- Course length: 2 miles (3.2 km)
- Distance: 150 laps, 300 mi (482.803 km)
- Scheduled distance: 150 laps, 300 mi (482.803 km)
- Average speed: 143.008 miles per hour (230.149 km/h)

Pole position
Driver	Daniel Suárez	Joe Gibbs Racing
- Time: 40.010

Most laps led
Driver	Kyle Busch	Joe Gibbs Racing
- Laps: 133

Winner
No. 2	Austin Dillon	Richard Childress Racing

Television in the United States
- Network: Fox Sports 1
- Announcers: Adam Alexander, Michael Waltrip, Brad Keselowski

Radio in the United States
- Radio: Motor Racing Network

The 2016 TreatMyClot.com 300 by Janessen was the fifth stock car race of the 2016 NASCAR Xfinity Series season and the 18th iteration of the event. The race was held on Saturday, March 19, 2016, in Fontana, California, at Auto Club Speedway, a 2 miles (3.2 km) permanent D-shaped oval racetrack. The race took the scheduled 150 laps to complete. In a wild finish, Austin Dillon, driving for Richard Childress Racing, would take advantage of both Daniel Suárez, who ran out of fuel on the final lap, and eventual second-place finisher Kyle Busch, who suffered a flat tire on the final lap. The win was Dillon's seventh career NASCAR Xfinity Series win and his first of the season. To fill out the podium, Bubba Wallace, driving for Roush Fenway Racing, would finish third.

== Background ==
The layout of Auto Club Speedway, the venue where the race was held.

Auto Club Speedway (previously California Speedway) was a two-mile (3.2 km), low-banked, D-shaped oval superspeedway in Fontana, California which hosted NASCAR racing annually from 1997 to 2023. It was also used for open wheel racing events. The racetrack was located near the former locations of Ontario Motor Speedway and Riverside International Raceway. The track was owned and operated by International Speedway Corporation and was the only track owned by ISC to have its naming rights sold. The speedway was served by the nearby Interstate 10 and Interstate 15 freeways as well as a Metrolink station located behind the backstretch.

=== Entry list ===
- (R) denotes rookie driver.
- (i) denotes driver who is ineligible for series driver points.

#	Driver	Team	Make	Sponsor
0	Garrett Smithley	JD Motorsports	Chevrolet	JD Motorsports
1	Elliott Sadler	JR Motorsports	Chevrolet	OneMain Financial
01	Ryan Preece (R)	JD Motorsports	Chevrolet	Uptick Vineyards
2	Austin Dillon (i)	Richard Childress Racing	Chevrolet	Rheem
3	Ty Dillon	Richard Childress Racing	Chevrolet	Wishes for Warriors, PAR Electric
4	Ross Chastain	JD Motorsports	Chevrolet	Shakey's Pizza
6	Bubba Wallace	Roush Fenway Racing	Ford	Ford EcoBoost
7	Justin Allgaier	JR Motorsports	Chevrolet	TaxSlayer
07	Ray Black Jr. (R)	SS-Green Light Racing	Chevrolet	ScubaLife
10	Matt DiBenedetto (i)	TriStar Motorsports	Toyota	TriStar Motorsports
11	Blake Koch	Kaulig Racing	Chevrolet	LeafFilter Gutter Protection
13	Carl Long	MBM Motorsports	Dodge	MBM Motorsports
14	J. J. Yeley	TriStar Motorsports	Toyota	TriStar Motorsports
15	Todd Peck	Rick Ware Racing	Ford	X-treme pH Sports Water
16	Ryan Reed	Roush Fenway Racing	Ford	Lilly Diabetes
18	Kyle Busch (i)	Joe Gibbs Racing	Toyota	NOS Energy
19	Daniel Suárez	Joe Gibbs Racing	Toyota	Interstate Batteries
20	Erik Jones (R)	Joe Gibbs Racing	Toyota	GameStop, NykoTech
21	Spencer Gallagher (i)	GMS Racing	Chevrolet	Allegiant Air, Kingman Chevrolet
22	Ryan Blaney (i)	Team Penske	Ford	Discount Tire
24	Corey LaJoie	JGL Racing	Toyota	Youtheory
25	Cody Ware (R)	Rick Ware Racing	Chevrolet	Lilly Trucking
28	Dakoda Armstrong	JGL Racing	Toyota	WinField United
33	Brandon Jones (R)	Richard Childress Racing	Chevrolet	Nexteer
39	Ryan Sieg	RSS Racing	Chevrolet	RSS Racing
40	Josh Wise (i)	MBM Motorsports	Toyota	MBM Motorsports
42	Kyle Larson (i)	Chip Ganassi Racing	Chevrolet	Eneos
43	Jeb Burton	Richard Petty Motorsports	Ford	J. Streicher
44	David Starr	TriStar Motorsports	Toyota	Zachry
48	Brennan Poole (R)	Chip Ganassi Racing	Chevrolet	DC Solar
51	Jeremy Clements	Jeremy Clements Racing	Chevrolet	RepairableVehicles.com
52	Joey Gase	Jimmy Means Racing	Chevrolet	Donate Life California
62	Brendan Gaughan	Richard Childress Racing	Chevrolet	South Point Hotel, Casino & Spa
70	Derrike Cope	Derrike Cope Racing	Chevrolet	E-Hydrate
74	Mike Harmon	Mike Harmon Racing	Dodge	Mike Harmon Racing
78	B. J. McLeod (R)	B. J. McLeod Motorsports	Ford	X-treme pH Sports Water
88	Kevin Harvick (i)	JR Motorsports	Chevrolet	Nalley Chili
89	Morgan Shepherd	Shepherd Racing Ventures	Chevrolet	Racing with Jesus
90	Mario Gosselin	King Autosport	Chevrolet	BuckedUp Apparel
93	Dylan Lupton	RSS Racing	Chevrolet	RSS Racing
97	Harrison Rhodes	Obaika Racing	Chevrolet	Vroom! Brands
98	Aric Almirola (i)	Biagi-DenBeste Racing	Ford	Ballast Point
Official entry list

== Practice ==
=== First practice ===
The first practice session was held on Friday, March 18, at 12:00 PM PST. The session would last for one hour and 25 minutes. Kyle Busch of Joe Gibbs Racing would set the fastest time in the session, with a lap of 40.603 and an average speed of 177.327 miles per hour (285.380 km/h).

Pos.	#	Driver	Team	Make	Time	Speed
1	18	Kyle Busch (i)	Joe Gibbs Racing	Toyota	40.603	177.327
2	20	Erik Jones (R)	Joe Gibbs Racing	Toyota	41.147	174.982
3	42	Kyle Larson (i)	Chip Ganassi Racing	Chevrolet	41.164	174.910
Full first practice results

=== Second and final practice ===
The final practice session, sometimes known as Happy Hour, was held on Friday, March 18, at 2:30 PM PST. The session would last for 55 minutes. Austin Dillon of Richard Childress Racing would set the fastest time in the session, with a lap of 40.765 and an average speed of 176.622 miles per hour (284.246 km/h).

Pos.	#	Driver	Team	Make	Time	Speed
1	2	Austin Dillon (i)	Richard Childress Racing	Chevrolet	40.765	176.622
2	18	Kyle Busch (i)	Joe Gibbs Racing	Toyota	40.906	176.013
3	22	Ryan Blaney (i)	Team Penske	Ford	40.941	175.863
Full Happy Hour practice results

== Qualifying ==
Qualifying was held on Saturday, March 19, at 9:15 AM PST. Since Auto Club Speedway is at least 2 miles (3.2 km) in length, the qualifying system was a single car, single lap, two round system where in the first round, everyone would set a time to determine positions 13–40. Then, the fastest 12 qualifiers would move on to the second round to determine positions 1–12.

Daniel Suárez of Joe Gibbs Racing would advance from the first round and win the pole by setting the fastest time in Round 2, with a lap of 40.010 and an average speed of 179.955 miles per hour (289.609 km/h).

Two drivers would fail to qualify: Carl Long and Morgan Shepherd.

=== Full qualifying results ===
Pos.	#	Driver	Team	Make	Time (R1)	Speed (R1)	Time (R2)	Speed (R2)
1	19	Daniel Suárez	Joe Gibbs Racing	Toyota	40.020	179.910	40.010	179.955
2	20	Erik Jones (R)	Joe Gibbs Racing	Toyota	40.009	179.960	40.107	179.520
3	18	Kyle Busch (i)	Joe Gibbs Racing	Toyota	39.965	180.158	40.138	179.381
4	42	Kyle Larson (i)	Chip Ganassi Racing	Chevrolet	40.140	179.372	40.227	178.984
5	1	Elliott Sadler	JR Motorsports	Chevrolet	40.314	178.598	40.303	178.647
6	2	Austin Dillon (i)	Richard Childress Racing	Chevrolet	40.084	179.623	40.342	178.474
7	43	Jeb Burton	Richard Petty Motorsports	Ford	40.172	179.229	40.409	178.178
8	11	Blake Koch	Kaulig Racing	Chevrolet	40.505	177.756	40.570	177.471
9	48	Brennan Poole (R)	Chip Ganassi Racing	Chevrolet	40.433	178.072	40.627	177.222
10	16	Ryan Reed	Roush Fenway Racing	Ford	40.528	177.655	40.680	176.991
11	22	Ryan Blaney (i)	Team Penske	Ford	40.023	179.897	40.756	176.661
12	3	Ty Dillon	Richard Childress Racing	Chevrolet	40.601	177.336	40.970	175.738
Eliminated in Round 1
13	6	Bubba Wallace	Roush Fenway Racing	Ford	40.624	177.235	-	-
14	33	Brandon Jones (R)	Richard Childress Racing	Chevrolet	40.630	177.209	-	-
15	62	Brendan Gaughan	Richard Childress Racing	Chevrolet	40.636	177.183	-	-
16	98	Aric Almirola (i)	Biagi-DenBeste Racing	Ford	40.637	177.178	-	-
17	88	Kevin Harvick (i)	JR Motorsports	Chevrolet	40.683	176.978	-	-
18	51	Jeremy Clements	Jeremy Clements Racing	Chevrolet	40.780	176.557	-	-
19	4	Ross Chastain	JD Motorsports	Chevrolet	40.923	175.940	-	-
20	7	Justin Allgaier	JR Motorsports	Chevrolet	40.987	175.665	-	-
21	28	Dakoda Armstrong	JGL Racing	Toyota	40.999	175.614	-	-
22	93	Dylan Lupton	RSS Racing	Chevrolet	41.033	175.469	-	-
23	39	Ryan Sieg	RSS Racing	Chevrolet	41.302	174.326	-	-
24	01	Ryan Preece (R)	JD Motorsports	Chevrolet	41.351	174.119	-	-
25	14	J. J. Yeley	TriStar Motorsports	Toyota	41.715	172.600	-	-
26	21	Spencer Gallagher (i)	GMS Racing	Chevrolet	41.748	172.463	-	-
27	0	Garrett Smithley (R)	JD Motorsports	Chevrolet	41.789	172.294	-	-
28	40	Josh Wise (i)	MBM Motorsports	Toyota	41.886	171.895	-	-
29	44	David Starr	TriStar Motorsports	Toyota	41.910	171.797	-	-
30	10	Matt DiBenedetto (i)	TriStar Motorsports	Toyota	41.937	171.686	-	-
31	52	Joey Gase	Jimmy Means Racing	Chevrolet	42.076	171.119	-	-
32	24	Corey LaJoie	JGL Racing	Toyota	42.249	170.418	-	-
33	07	Ray Black Jr. (R)	SS-Green Light Racing	Chevrolet	42.482	169.484	-	-
Qualified by owner's points
34	70	Derrike Cope	Derrike Cope Racing	Chevrolet	42.809	168.189	-	-
35	90	Mario Gosselin	King Autosport	Chevrolet	42.952	167.629	-	-
36	97	Harrison Rhodes	Obaika Racing	Chevrolet	42.969	167.563	-	-
37	78	B. J. McLeod (R)	B. J. McLeod Motorsports	Ford	43.083	167.119	-	-
38	74	Mike Harmon	Mike Harmon Racing	Dodge	43.341	166.124	-	-
39	15	Todd Peck	Rick Ware Racing	Ford	44.162	163.036	-	-
40	25	Cody Ware (R)	Rick Ware Racing	Chevrolet	46.267	155.618	-	-
Failed to qualify
41	13	Carl Long	MBM Motorsports	Dodge	42.986	167.496	-	-
42	89	Morgan Shepherd	Shepherd Racing Ventures	Chevrolet	43.186	166.721	-	-
Official qualifying results
Official starting lineup

== Race results ==
Fin	St	#	Driver	Team	Make	Laps	Led	Status	Pts
1	6	2	Austin Dillon (i)	Richard Childress Racing	Chevrolet	150	1	running	0
2	3	18	Kyle Busch (i)	Joe Gibbs Racing	Toyota	150	133	running	0
3	13	6	Bubba Wallace	Roush Fenway Racing	Ford	150	0	running	38
4	1	19	Daniel Suárez	Joe Gibbs Racing	Toyota	150	4	running	38
5	5	1	Elliott Sadler	JR Motorsports	Chevrolet	150	0	running	36
6	17	88	Kevin Harvick (i)	JR Motorsports	Chevrolet	150	0	running	0
7	15	62	Brendan Gaughan	Richard Childress Racing	Chevrolet	150	2	running	35
8	4	42	Kyle Larson (i)	Chip Ganassi Racing	Chevrolet	150	5	running	0
9	14	33	Brandon Jones (R)	Richard Childress Racing	Chevrolet	150	0	running	32
10	20	7	Justin Allgaier	JR Motorsports	Chevrolet	150	0	running	31
11	16	98	Aric Almirola (i)	Biagi-DenBeste Racing	Ford	150	3	running	0
12	8	11	Blake Koch	Kaulig Racing	Chevrolet	150	0	running	29
13	9	48	Brennan Poole (R)	Chip Ganassi Racing	Chevrolet	149	0	running	28
14	10	16	Ryan Reed	Roush Fenway Racing	Ford	149	0	running	27
15	2	20	Erik Jones (R)	Joe Gibbs Racing	Toyota	149	0	running	26
16	7	43	Jeb Burton	Richard Petty Motorsports	Ford	149	0	running	25
17	12	3	Ty Dillon	Richard Childress Racing	Chevrolet	149	0	running	24
18	32	24	Corey LaJoie	JGL Racing	Toyota	149	0	running	23
19	19	4	Ross Chastain	JD Motorsports	Chevrolet	149	0	running	22
20	11	22	Ryan Blaney (i)	Team Penske	Ford	148	0	running	0
21	18	51	Jeremy Clements	Jeremy Clements Racing	Chevrolet	148	0	running	20
22	21	28	Dakoda Armstrong	JGL Racing	Toyota	148	0	running	19
23	27	0	Garrett Smithley (R)	JD Motorsports	Chevrolet	148	0	running	18
24	26	21	Spencer Gallagher (i)	GMS Racing	Chevrolet	148	0	running	0
25	24	01	Ryan Preece (R)	JD Motorsports	Chevrolet	148	1	running	17
26	35	90	Mario Gosselin	King Autosport	Chevrolet	147	0	running	15
27	25	14	J. J. Yeley	TriStar Motorsports	Toyota	147	0	running	14
28	31	52	Joey Gase	Jimmy Means Racing	Chevrolet	145	0	running	13
29	23	39	Ryan Sieg	RSS Racing	Chevrolet	145	0	running	12
30	39	15	Todd Peck	Rick Ware Racing	Ford	141	0	running	11
31	40	25	Cody Ware (R)	Rick Ware Racing	Chevrolet	140	0	running	10
32	38	74	Mike Harmon	Mike Harmon Racing	Dodge	139	0	running	9
33	37	78	B. J. McLeod (R)	B. J. McLeod Motorsports	Ford	95	0	engine	8
34	34	70	Derrike Cope	Derrike Cope Racing	Chevrolet	89	0	engine	7
35	36	97	Harrison Rhodes	Obaika Racing	Chevrolet	84	0	engine	6
36	22	93	Dylan Lupton	RSS Racing	Chevrolet	56	0	crash	5
37	33	07	Ray Black Jr. (R)	SS-Green Light Racing	Chevrolet	44	0	crash	4
38	29	44	David Starr	TriStar Motorsports	Toyota	30	0	engine	3
39	28	40	Josh Wise (i)	MBM Motorsports	Toyota	18	1	vibration	0
40	30	10	Matt DiBenedetto (i)	TriStar Motorsports	Toyota	2	0	brakes	0
Failed to qualify
41		13	Carl Long	MBM Motorsports	Dodge				
42		89	Morgan Shepherd	Shepherd Racing Ventures	Chevrolet				
Official race results

== Standings after the race ==
Drivers' Championship standings

Pos	Driver	Points
1	Daniel Suárez	182
2	Elliott Sadler	172 (-10)
3	Justin Allgaier	163 (–19)
4	Brandon Jones	161 (–21)
5	Ty Dillon	159 (–23)
6	Brendan Gaughan	154 (-28)
7	Erik Jones	152 (-30)
8	Bubba Wallace	134 (-48)
9	Ryan Reed	133 (-49)
10	Brennan Poole	130 (-52)
11	Blake Koch	122 (-60)
12	Jeb Burton	121 (-61)
Official driver's standings

- Note: Only the first 12 positions are included for the driver standings.

Previous race: 2016 Axalta Faster. Tougher. Brighter. 200	NASCAR Xfinity Series; 2016 season	Next race: 2016 O'Reilly Auto Parts 300
