= 2016 Axalta Faster. Tougher. Brighter. 200 =

Fourth race of the 2016 NASCAR Xfinity Series

Race details
- Race 4 of 33 in the 2016 NASCAR Xfinity Series
- Date: March 12, 2016
- Official name: 12th Annual Axalta Faster. Tougher. Brighter. 200
- Location: Avondale, Arizona, Phoenix International Raceway
- Course: Permanent racing facility
- Course length: 1 miles (1.6 km)
- Distance: 200 laps, 200 mi (321.868 km)
- Scheduled distance: 200 laps, 200 mi (321.868 km)
- Average speed: 114.087 miles per hour (183.605 km/h)

Pole position
Driver	Erik Jones	Joe Gibbs Racing
- Time: 26.318

Most laps led
Driver	Kyle Busch	Joe Gibbs Racing
- Laps: 175

Winner
No. 18	Kyle Busch	Joe Gibbs Racing

Television in the United States
- Network: FOX
- Announcers: Adam Alexander, Michael Waltrip, Joey Logano

Radio in the United States
- Radio: Motor Racing Network

The 2016 Axalta Faster. Tougher. Brighter. 200 was the fourth stock car race of the 2016 NASCAR Xfinity Series season and the 12th iteration of the event. The race was held on Saturday, March 12, 2016, in Avondale, Arizona at Phoenix International Raceway, a 1-mile (1.6 km) permanent low-banked tri-oval race track. The race took the scheduled 200 laps to complete. At race's end, Kyle Busch, driving for Joe Gibbs Racing, would dominate the race to win his 79th career NASCAR Xfinity Series race and his third win of the season. To fill out the podium, Erik Jones and Daniel Suárez, both driving for Joe Gibbs Racing, would finish second and third, respectively.

== Background ==
The layout of Phoenix International Raceway, the venue where the race was held.

Phoenix International Raceway – also known as PIR – is a one-mile, low-banked tri-oval race track located in Avondale, Arizona. It is named after the nearby metropolitan area of Phoenix. The motorsport track opened in 1964 and currently hosts two NASCAR race weekends annually. PIR has also hosted the IndyCar Series, CART, USAC and the Rolex Sports Car Series. The raceway is currently owned and operated by International Speedway Corporation.

The raceway was originally constructed with a 2.5 mi (4.0 km) road course that ran both inside and outside of the main tri-oval. In 1991 the track was reconfigured with the current 1.51 mi (2.43 km) interior layout. PIR has an estimated grandstand seating capacity of around 67,000. Lights were installed around the track in 2004 following the addition of a second annual NASCAR race weekend.

=== Entry list ===
- (R) denotes rookie driver.
- (i) denotes driver who is ineligible for series driver points.

#	Driver	Team	Make	Sponsor
0	Garrett Smithley	JD Motorsports	Chevrolet	JD Motorsports
1	Elliott Sadler	JR Motorsports	Chevrolet	OneMain Financial
01	Ryan Preece (R)	JD Motorsports	Chevrolet	JD Motorsports
2	Austin Dillon (i)	Richard Childress Racing	Chevrolet	Ruud
3	Ty Dillon	Richard Childress Racing	Chevrolet	Bass Pro Shops, Tracker Boats
4	Ross Chastain	JD Motorsports	Chevrolet	JD Motorsports
6	Bubba Wallace	Roush Fenway Racing	Ford	Cheez-It
7	Justin Allgaier	JR Motorsports	Chevrolet	Brandt Professional Agriculture
07	Ray Black Jr. (R)	SS-Green Light Racing	Chevrolet	ScubaLife
10	Jeff Green	TriStar Motorsports	Toyota	TriStar Motorsports
11	Blake Koch	Kaulig Racing	Chevrolet	LeafFilter Gutter Protection
13	D. J. Kennington	MBM Motorsports	Dodge	Northern Provincial Pipelines
14	J. J. Yeley	TriStar Motorsports	Toyota	TriStar Motorsports
15	Ryan Ellis*	Rick Ware Racing	Ford	X-treme pH Sports Water
16	Ryan Reed	Roush Fenway Racing	Ford	Lilly Diabetes
18	Kyle Busch (i)	Joe Gibbs Racing	Toyota	NOS Energy
19	Daniel Suárez	Joe Gibbs Racing	Toyota	Juniper Networks
20	Erik Jones (R)	Joe Gibbs Racing	Toyota	Reser's Fine Foods
21	Spencer Gallagher (i)	GMS Racing	Chevrolet	Allegiant Air, Kingman Chevrolet
22	Brad Keselowski (i)	Team Penske	Ford	Discount Tire
24	T. J. Bell	JGL Racing	Toyota	JGL Racing Young Guns
25	Timmy Hill	Team Kapusta Racing	Chevrolet	Wrap Nation
28	Dakoda Armstrong	JGL Racing	Toyota	JGL Racing
33	Brandon Jones (R)	Richard Childress Racing	Chevrolet	E-Z-GO
39	Ryan Sieg	RSS Racing	Chevrolet	RSS Racing
40	Josh Reaume	MBM Motorsports	Toyota	MBM Motorsports
42	Justin Marks	Chip Ganassi Racing	Chevrolet	Katerra
43	Jeb Burton	Richard Petty Motorsports	Ford	J. Streicher
44	David Starr	TriStar Motorsports	Toyota	Zachry
48	Brennan Poole (R)	Chip Ganassi Racing	Chevrolet	DC Solar
51	Jeremy Clements	Jeremy Clements Racing	Chevrolet	Jeremy Clements Racing
52	Joey Gase	Jimmy Means Racing	Chevrolet	Donate Life Arizona
62	Brendan Gaughan	Richard Childress Racing	Chevrolet	South Point Hotel, Casino & Spa
70	Derrike Cope	Derrike Cope Racing	Chevrolet	Ashurst American Honey, E-Hydrate
74	Mike Harmon	Mike Harmon Racing	Dodge	Mike Harmon Racing
78	B. J. McLeod (R)	B. J. McLeod Motorsports	Ford	X-treme pH Sports Water
88	Chase Elliott (i)	JR Motorsports	Chevrolet	TaxSlayer
89	Morgan Shepherd	Shepherd Racing Ventures	Chevrolet	Racing with Jesus
90	Mario Gosselin	King Autosport	Chevrolet	BuckedUp Apparel
93	Dylan Lupton	RSS Racing	Chevrolet	RSS Racing
97	Harrison Rhodes	Obaika Racing	Chevrolet	Vroom! Brands
99	Todd Peck	B. J. McLeod Motorsports	Ford	X-treme pH Sports Water
Official entry list

*Driver changed to Todd Peck after Ellis wrecked in qualifying.

== Practice ==
=== First practice ===
The first practice session was held on Friday, March 11, at 9:30 a.m. MST. The session would last for 55 minutes. Erik Jones of Joe Gibbs Racing would set the fastest time in the session, with a lap of 26.840 and an average speed of 134.128 miles per hour (215.858 km/h).

Pos.	#	Driver	Team	Make	Time	Speed
1	20	Erik Jones (R)	Joe Gibbs Racing	Toyota	26.840	134.128
2	3	Ty Dillon	Richard Childress Racing	Chevrolet	26.881	133.924
3	39	Ryan Sieg	RSS Racing	Chevrolet	26.988	133.393
Full first practice results

=== Second practice ===
The second practice session was held on Friday, March 11, at 1:00 p.m. MST. The session would last for one hour and 25 minutes. Erik Jones of Joe Gibbs Racing would set the fastest time in the session, with a lap of 26.855 and an average speed of 134.053 miles per hour (215.737 km/h).

Pos.	#	Driver	Team	Make	Time	Speed
1	20	Erik Jones (R)	Joe Gibbs Racing	Toyota	26.855	134.053
2	19	Daniel Suárez	Joe Gibbs Racing	Toyota	26.888	133.889
3	18	Kyle Busch (i)	Joe Gibbs Racing	Toyota	27.096	132.861
Full second practice results

=== Third and final practice ===
The final practice session, sometimes known as Happy Hour, was held on Friday, March 11, at 3:30 p.m. MST. The session would last for 55 minutes. Ty Dillon of Richard Childress Racing would set the fastest time in the session, with a lap of 27.050 and an average speed of 133.087 miles per hour (214.183 km/h).

Pos.	#	Driver	Team	Make	Time	Speed
1	3	Ty Dillon	Richard Childress Racing	Chevrolet	27.050	133.087
2	19	Daniel Suárez	Joe Gibbs Racing	Toyota	27.111	132.787
3	20	Erik Jones (R)	Joe Gibbs Racing	Toyota	27.125	132.719
Full Happy Hour practice results

== Qualifying ==
Qualifying was held on Saturday, March 12, at 9:45 a.m. MST. Since Phoenix International Raceway is under 2 miles (3.2 km), the qualifying system was a multi-car system that included three rounds. The first round was 15 minutes, where every driver would be able to set a lap within the 15 minutes. Then, the second round would consist of the fastest 24 cars in Round 1, and drivers would have 10 minutes to set a lap. Round 3 consisted of the fastest 12 drivers from Round 2, and the drivers would have 5 minutes to set a time. Whoever was fastest in Round 3 would win the pole.

Erik Jones of Joe Gibbs Racing would win the pole after advancing from both preliminary rounds and setting the fastest lap in Round 3, with a time of 26.318 and an average speed of 136.789 miles per hour (220.141 km/h).

Two drivers would fail to qualify: Josh Reaume and Todd Peck.

=== Full qualifying results ===
Pos.	#	Driver	Team	Make	Time (R1)	Speed (R1)	Time (R2)	Speed (R2)	Time (R3)	Speed (R3)
1	20	Erik Jones (R)	Joe Gibbs Racing	Toyota	26.996	133.353	26.507	135.813	26.318	136.789
2	19	Daniel Suárez	Joe Gibbs Racing	Toyota	26.768	134.489	26.695	134.857	26.346	136.643
3	18	Kyle Busch (i)	Joe Gibbs Racing	Toyota	27.217	132.270	26.637	135.150	26.390	136.415
4	3	Ty Dillon	Richard Childress Racing	Chevrolet	27.083	132.925	26.866	133.998	26.588	135.399
5	88	Chase Elliott (i)	JR Motorsports	Chevrolet	27.022	133.225	26.876	133.949	26.622	135.227
6	2	Austin Dillon (i)	Richard Childress Racing	Chevrolet	27.318	131.781	26.838	134.138	26.631	135.181
7	22	Brad Keselowski (i)	Team Penske	Ford	27.043	133.121	26.819	134.233	26.637	135.150
8	33	Brandon Jones (R)	Richard Childress Racing	Chevrolet	27.229	132.212	26.845	134.103	26.674	134.963
9	6	Bubba Wallace	Roush Fenway Racing	Ford	27.102	132.832	26.685	134.907	26.683	134.917
10	7	Justin Allgaier	JR Motorsports	Chevrolet	27.056	133.057	26.820	134.228	26.714	134.761
11	62	Brendan Gaughan	Richard Childress Racing	Chevrolet	27.209	132.309	26.943	133.615	26.797	134.343
12	11	Blake Koch	Kaulig Racing	Chevrolet	27.239	132.163	26.938	133.640	26.850	134.078
Eliminated in Round 2
13	16	Ryan Reed	Roush Fenway Racing	Ford	27.276	131.984	26.960	133.531	-	-
14	42	Justin Marks	Chip Ganassi Racing	Chevrolet	27.207	132.319	26.983	133.417	-	-
15	43	Jeb Burton	Richard Petty Motorsports	Ford	27.238	132.168	27.001	133.328	-	-
16	1	Elliott Sadler	JR Motorsports	Chevrolet	27.347	131.641	27.004	133.314	-	-
17	48	Brennan Poole (R)	Chip Ganassi Racing	Chevrolet	27.313	131.805	27.030	133.185	-	-
18	21	Spencer Gallagher (i)	GMS Racing	Chevrolet	27.059	133.043	27.120	132.743	-	-
19	4	Ross Chastain	JD Motorsports	Chevrolet	27.188	132.411	27.129	132.699	-	-
20	51	Jeremy Clements	Jeremy Clements Racing	Chevrolet	27.361	131.574	27.239	132.163	-	-
21	39	Ryan Sieg	RSS Racing	Chevrolet	27.294	131.897	27.309	131.825	-	-
22	44	David Starr	TriStar Motorsports	Toyota	27.395	131.411	27.375	131.507	-	-
23	14	J. J. Yeley	TriStar Motorsports	Toyota	27.382	131.473	27.449	131.152	-	-
24	01	Ryan Preece (R)	JD Motorsports	Chevrolet	27.180	132.450	27.526	130.785	-	-
Eliminated in Round 1
25	07	Ray Black Jr. (R)	SS-Green Light Racing	Chevrolet	27.395	131.411	-	-	-	-
26	28	Dakoda Armstrong	JGL Racing	Toyota	27.440	131.195	-	-	-	-
27	24	T. J. Bell	JGL Racing	Toyota	27.462	131.090	-	-	-	-
28	93	Dylan Lupton	RSS Racing	Chevrolet	27.489	130.961	-	-	-	-
29	10	Jeff Green	TriStar Motorsports	Toyota	27.496	130.928	-	-	-	-
30	89	Morgan Shepherd	Shepherd Racing Ventures	Chevrolet	27.637	130.260	-	-	-	-
31	25	Timmy Hill	Team Kapusta Racing	Chevrolet	27.648	130.208	-	-	-	-
32	90	Mario Gosselin	King Autosport	Chevrolet	27.701	129.959	-	-	-	-
33	13	D. J. Kennington	MBM Motorsports	Dodge	27.731	129.819	-	-	-	-
Qualified by owner's points
34	0	Garrett Smithley (R)	JD Motorsports	Chevrolet	27.895	129.055	-	-	-	-
35	78	B. J. McLeod (R)	B. J. McLeod Motorsports	Ford	27.977	128.677	-	-	-	-
36	52	Joey Gase	Jimmy Means Racing	Chevrolet	28.071	128.246	-	-	-	-
37	70	Derrike Cope	Derrike Cope Racing	Chevrolet	28.104	128.096	-	-	-	-
38	97	Harrison Rhodes	Obaika Racing	Chevrolet	28.241	127.474	-	-	-	-
39	74	Mike Harmon	Mike Harmon Racing	Dodge	28.460	126.493	-	-	-	-
40	15	Ryan Ellis	Rick Ware Racing	Ford	-	-	-	-	-	-
Failed to qualify
41	40	Josh Reaume	MBM Motorsports	Toyota	28.414	126.698	-	-	-	-
42	99	Todd Peck	B. J. McLeod Motorsports	Ford	28.426	126.645	-	-	-	-
Official qualifying results
Official starting lineup

== Race results ==
Fin	St	#	Driver	Team	Make	Laps	Led	Status	Pts
1	3	18	Kyle Busch (i)	Joe Gibbs Racing	Toyota	200	175	running	0
2	1	20	Erik Jones (R)	Joe Gibbs Racing	Toyota	200	5	running	40
3	2	19	Daniel Suárez	Joe Gibbs Racing	Toyota	200	0	running	38
4	10	7	Justin Allgaier	JR Motorsports	Chevrolet	200	0	running	37
5	5	88	Chase Elliott (i)	JR Motorsports	Chevrolet	200	0	running	0
6	4	3	Ty Dillon	Richard Childress Racing	Chevrolet	200	11	running	36
7	6	2	Austin Dillon (i)	Richard Childress Racing	Chevrolet	200	0	running	0
8	16	1	Elliott Sadler	JR Motorsports	Chevrolet	200	0	running	33
9	7	22	Brad Keselowski (i)	Team Penske	Ford	200	9	running	0
10	17	48	Brennan Poole (R)	Chip Ganassi Racing	Chevrolet	200	0	running	31
11	8	33	Brandon Jones (R)	Richard Childress Racing	Chevrolet	200	0	running	30
12	9	6	Bubba Wallace	Roush Fenway Racing	Ford	199	0	running	29
13	11	62	Brendan Gaughan	Richard Childress Racing	Chevrolet	199	0	running	28
14	13	16	Ryan Reed	Roush Fenway Racing	Ford	199	0	running	27
15	14	42	Justin Marks	Chip Ganassi Racing	Chevrolet	199	0	running	26
16	12	11	Blake Koch	Kaulig Racing	Chevrolet	199	0	running	25
17	15	43	Jeb Burton	Richard Petty Motorsports	Ford	199	0	running	24
18	26	28	Dakoda Armstrong	JGL Racing	Toyota	198	0	running	23
19	28	93	Dylan Lupton	RSS Racing	Chevrolet	198	0	running	22
20	23	14	J. J. Yeley	TriStar Motorsports	Toyota	198	0	running	21
21	24	01	Ryan Preece (R)	JD Motorsports	Chevrolet	197	0	running	20
22	22	44	David Starr	TriStar Motorsports	Toyota	197	0	running	19
23	18	21	Spencer Gallagher (i)	GMS Racing	Chevrolet	196	0	running	0
24	19	4	Ross Chastain	JD Motorsports	Chevrolet	196	0	running	17
25	25	07	Ray Black Jr. (R)	SS-Green Light Racing	Chevrolet	196	0	running	16
26	27	24	T. J. Bell	JGL Racing	Toyota	196	0	running	15
27	21	39	Ryan Sieg	RSS Racing	Chevrolet	195	0	running	14
28	20	51	Jeremy Clements	Jeremy Clements Racing	Chevrolet	195	0	running	13
29	35	78	B. J. McLeod (R)	B. J. McLeod Motorsports	Ford	194	0	running	12
30	38	97	Harrison Rhodes	Obaika Racing	Chevrolet	194	0	running	11
31	34	0	Garrett Smithley (R)	JD Motorsports	Chevrolet	194	0	running	10
32	31	25	Timmy Hill	Team Kapusta Racing	Chevrolet	193	0	running	9
33	36	52	Joey Gase	Jimmy Means Racing	Chevrolet	191	0	running	8
34	37	70	Derrike Cope	Derrike Cope Racing	Chevrolet	191	0	running	7
35	32	90	Mario Gosselin	King Autosport	Chevrolet	190	0	running	6
36	33	13	D. J. Kennington	MBM Motorsports	Dodge	190	0	running	5
37	40	15	Todd Peck	Rick Ware Racing	Ford	188	0	running	4
38	39	74	Mike Harmon	Mike Harmon Racing	Dodge	182	0	running	3
39	30	89	Morgan Shepherd	Shepherd Racing Ventures	Chevrolet	11	0	overheating	2
40	29	10	Jeff Green	TriStar Motorsports	Toyota	5	0	vibration	1
Failed to qualify
41		40	Josh Reaume	MBM Motorsports	Toyota				
42		99	Todd Peck	B. J. McLeod Motorsports	Ford				
Official race results

== Standings after the race ==
Drivers' Championship standings

Pos	Driver	Points
1	Daniel Suárez	144
2	Elliott Sadler	136 (-8)
3	Ty Dillon	135 (–9)
4	Justin Allgaier	132 (–12)
5	Brandon Jones	129 (–15)
6	Erik Jones	126 (-18)
7	Brendan Gaughan	119 (-25)
8	Ryan Reed	106 (-38)
9	Brennan Poole	102 (-42)
10	Bubba Wallace	96 (-48)
11	Jeb Burton	96 (-48)
12	Blake Koch	93 (-51)
Official driver's standings

- Note: Only the first 12 positions are included for the driver standings.

Previous race: 2016 Boyd Gaming 300	NASCAR Xfinity Series; 2016 season	Next race: 2016 TreatMyClot.com 300
