= 2016 Boyd Gaming 300 =

3rd race of the 2016 NASCAR Xfinity Series

Race details
- Race 3 of 33 in the 2016 NASCAR Xfinity Series
- Date: March 5, 2016
- Official name: 20th annual Boyd Gaming 300
- Location: Las Vegas, Nevada, Las Vegas Motor Speedway
- Course: Permanent racing facility
- Course length: 1.50 miles (2.41 km)
- Distance: 200 laps, 300.00 mi (482.803 km)
- Scheduled distance: 200 laps, 300.00 mi (482.803 km)
- Average speed: 145.415 miles per hour (234.023 km/h)

Pole position
Driver	Kyle Busch	Joe Gibbs Racing
- Time: 29.557

Most laps led
Driver	Kyle Busch	Joe Gibbs Racing
- Laps: 199

Winner
No. 18	Kyle Busch	Joe Gibbs Racing

Television in the United States
- Network: FS1
- Announcers: Adam Alexander, Clint Bowyer, and Michael Waltrip

Radio in the United States
- Radio: Performance Racing Network

The 2016 Boyd Gaming 300 was the 3rd stock car race of the 2016 NASCAR Xfinity Series season and the 20th iteration of the event. The race was held on Saturday, March 5, 2016, in Las Vegas, Nevada, at Las Vegas Motor Speedway a 1.5 miles (2.41 km) permanent D-shaped oval racetrac. The race took the scheduled 200 laps to complete. Kyle Busch, driving for Joe Gibbs Racing led a dominating 199 out of 200 laps to earn his 78th career NASCAR Xfinity Series win and his second of the season. To fill out the podium, Daniel Suárez of Joe Gibbs Racing and Erik Jones, also of Joe Gibbs Racing, would finish second and third, respectively.

== Background ==
Las Vegas Motor Speedway, located in Clark County, Nevada outside the Las Vegas city limits and about 15 miles northeast of the Las Vegas Strip, is a 1,200-acre (490 ha) complex of multiple tracks for motorsports racing. The complex is owned by Speedway Motorsports, Inc., which is headquartered in Charlotte, North Carolina.

=== Entry list ===
- (R) denotes rookie driver.
- (i) denotes driver who is ineligible for series driver points.

#	Driver	Team	Make
0	Garrett Smithley	JD Motorsports	Chevrolet
1	Elliott Sadler	JR Motorsports	Chevrolet
01	Ryan Preece (R)	JD Motorsports	Chevrolet
2	Austin Dillon (i)	Richard Childress Racing	Chevrolet
3	Ty Dillon	Richard Childress Racing	Chevrolet
4	Ross Chastain	JD Motorsports	Chevrolet
6	Bubba Wallace	Roush Fenway Racing	Ford
7	Justin Allgaier	JR Motorsports	Chevrolet
07	Ray Black Jr. (R)	SS-Green Light Racing	Chevrolet
10	Jeff Green	TriStar Motorsports	Toyota
11	Blake Koch	Kaulig Racing	Chevrolet
13	Derek White	MBM Motorsports	Dodge
14	J. J. Yeley	TriStar Motorsports	Toyota
15	Stanton Barrett	Rick Ware Racing	Chevrolet
16	Ryan Reed	Roush Fenway Racing	Ford
18	Kyle Busch (i)	Joe Gibbs Racing	Toyota
19	Daniel Suárez	Joe Gibbs Racing	Toyota
20	Erik Jones (R)	Joe Gibbs Racing	Toyota
22	Brad Keselowski (i)	Team Penske	Ford
24	Corey LaJoie	JGL Racing	Toyota
25	Cody Ware	Rick Ware Racing	Chevrolet
28	Dakoda Armstrong	JGL Racing	Toyota
33	Brandon Jones (R)	Richard Childress Racing	Chevrolet
39	Ryan Sieg	RSS Racing	Chevrolet
40	Carl Long	MBM Motorsports	Toyota
42	Justin Marks	Chip Ganassi Racing	Chevrolet
43	Jeb Burton	Richard Petty Motorsports	Ford
44	David Starr	TriStar Motorsports	Toyota
48	Brennan Poole (R)	Chip Ganassi Racing	Chevrolet
51	Jeremy Clements	Jeremy Clements Racing	Chevrolet
52	Joey Gase	Jimmy Means Racing	Chevrolet
62	Brendan Gaughan	Richard Childress Racing	Chevrolet
70	Derrike Cope	Derrike Cope Racing	Chevrolet
74	Mike Harmon	Mike Harmon Racing	Dodge
78	B. J. McLeod (R)	B. J. McLeod Motorsports	Ford
88	Chase Elliott (i)	JR Motorsports	Chevrolet
89	Morgan Shepherd	Shepherd Racing Ventures	Chevrolet
90	Mario Gosselin	King Autosport	Chevrolet
93	Josh Reaume	RSS Racing	Chevrolet
97	Harrison Rhodes	Obaika Racing	Chevrolet
98	Aric Almirola (i)	Biagi-DenBeste Racing	Ford
99	Todd Peck	B. J. McLeod Motorsports	Ford
Official entry list

== Practice ==
=== First practice ===
The first practice session was held on Friday, March 4 at 4:05 PM EST. Erik Jones of Joe Gibbs Racing would set the fastest time in the session, with a lap of 29.493 and an average speed of 183.904 mph (295.965 km/h).

Pos.	#	Driver	Team	Make	Time	Speed
1	20	Erik Jones (R)	Joe Gibbs Racing	Toyota	29.493	183.094
2	19	Daniel Suárez	Joe Gibbs Racing	Toyota	29.525	182.896
3	62	Brendan Gaughan	Richard Childress Racing	Chevrolet	29.653	182.106
Full first practice results

=== Second and final practice ===
The final practice session, sometimes referred to as Happy Hour, was held on Friday, March 4, at 6:05 PM EST. Kyle Busch of Joe Gibbs Racing would set the fastest time in the session, with a lap of 29.777 and an average speed of 181.348 mph (291.851 km/h).

Pos.	#	Driver	Team	Make	Time	Speed
1	18	Kyle Busch (i)	Joe Gibbs Racing	Toyota	29.777	181.348
2	3	Ty Dillon	Richard Childress Racing	Chevrolet	29.852	180.892
3	20	Erik Jones (R)	Joe Gibbs Racing	Toyota	29.854	180.880
Full Happy Hour practice results

== Qualifying ==
Qualifying was held on Saturday, March 5. Since Las Vegas Motor Speedway is under 2 miles (3.2 km), the qualifying system was a multi-car system that included three rounds. The first round was 15 minutes, where every driver would be able to set a lap within the 15 minutes. Then, the second round would consist of the fastest 24 cars in Round 1, and drivers would have 10 minutes to set a lap. Round 3 consisted of the fastest 12 drivers from Round 2, and the drivers would have 5 minutes to set a time. Whoever was fastest in Round 3 would win the pole.

Kyle Busch of Joe Gibbs Racing would win the pole after advancing from the preliminary round and setting the fastest lap in Round 3, with a time of 29.557 and an average speed of 182.698 mph (294.024 km/h).

Derrike Cope and Todd Peck failed to qualify.

=== Full qualifying results ===
Pos.	#	Driver	Team	Make	Time (R1)	Speed (R1)	Time (R2)	Speed (R2)	Time (R3)	Speed (R3)
1	18	Kyle Busch (i)	Joe Gibbs Racing	Toyota	29.552	182.914	29.436	183.449	29.557	182.698
2	20	Erik Jones (R)	Joe Gibbs Racing	Toyota	29.665	128.033	29.667	182.020	29.566	182.642
3	19	Daniel Suárez	Joe Gibbs Racing	Toyota	29.713	181.739	29.618	182.322	29.586	182.519
4	88	Chase Elliott (i)	JR Motorsports	Chevrolet	29.890	180.662	29.759	181.458	29.719	181.702
5	33	Brandon Jones (R)	Richard Childress Racing	Chevrolet	29.669	182.008	29.706	181.781	29.722	181.684
6	7	Justin Allgaier	JR Motorsports	Chevrolet	29.998	180.012	29.896	180.626	29.762	181.439
7	1	Elliott Sadler	JR Motorsports	Chevrolet	30.021	179.874	29.918	180.493	29.772	181.378
8	62	Brendan Gaughan	Richard Childress Racing	Chevrolet	29.951	180.294	29.904	180.578	29.795	181.238
9	3	Ty Dillon	Richard Childress Racing	Chevrolet	30.002	179.988	29.901	180.596	29.931	180.415
10	98	Aric Almirola (i)	Biagi-DenBeste Racing	Ford	30.094	178.438	29.909	180.548	29.976	180.144
11	48	Brennan Poole (R)	Chip Ganassi Racing	Chevrolet	29.922	180.469	29.933	180.403	29.988	180.072
12	6	Bubba Wallace	Roush Fenway Racing	Ford	30.175	178.956	29.944	180.337	29.997	180.018
Eliminated in Round 2
13	42	Justin Marks	Chip Ganassi Racing	Chevrolet	30.049	179.706	29.970	180.180	-	-
14	2	Austin Dillon (i)	Richard Childress Racing	Chevrolet	30.139	179.170	29.971	180.174	-	-
15	22	Brad Keselowski (i)	Team Penske	Ford	30.139	179.170	30.043	179.742	-	-
16	28	Dakoda Armstrong	JGL Racing	Chevrolet	30.139	179.170	30.134	179.200	-	-
17	11	Blake Koch	Kaulig Racing	Chevrolet	30.414	177.550	30.155	179.075	-	-
18	16	Ryan Reed	Roush Fenway Racing	Ford	30.264	178.430	30.161	179.039	-	-
19	39	Ryan Sieg	RSS Racing	Chevrolet	30.264	178.430	30.162	179.033	-	-
20	01	Ryan Preece (R)	JD Motorsports	Chevrolet	30.470	177.223	30.244	178.548	-	-
21	43	Jeb Burton	Richard Petty Motorsports	Ford	30.359	177.871	30.334	178.018	-	-
22	24	Corey LaJoie	JGL Racing	Toyota	30.375	177.778	30.403	177.614	-	-
23	51	Jeremy Clements	Jeremy Clements Racing	Chevrolet	30.532	176.864	30.526	176.898	-	-
24	4	Ross Chastain	JD Motorsports	Chevrolet	30.274	178.371	30.623	176.338	-	-
Eliminated in Round 1
25	0	Garrett Smithley (R)	JD Motorsports	Chevrolet	30.535	176.846	-	-	-	-
26	14	J. J. Yeley	TriStar Motorsports	Toyota	30.714	175.816	-	-	-	-
27	07	Ray Black Jr. (R)	SS-Green Light Racing	Chevrolet	30.805	175.296	-	-	-	-
28	97	Harrison Rhodes	Obaika Racing	Chevrolet	30.921	174.639	-	-	-	-
29	89	Morgan Shepherd	Shepherd Racing Ventures	Chevrolet	31.111	173.572	-	-	-	-
30	44	David Starr	TriStar Motorsports	Toyota	31.146	173.377	-	-	-	-
31	10	Jeff Green	TriStar Motorsports	Toyota	31.333	172.342	-	-	-	-
32	93	Josh Reaume	RSS Racing	Chevrolet	31.407	171.936	-	-	-	-
33	40	Carl Long	MBM Motorsports	Toyota	31.409	171.925	-	-	-	-
Qualified by owner's points
34	90	Mario Gosselin	DGM Racing	Chevrolet	31.472	171.581	-	-	-	-
35	25	Cody Ware (R)	Rick Ware Racing	Chevrolet	31.553	171.141	-	-	-	-
36	52	Joey Gase	Jimmy Means Racing	Chevrolet	31.729	170.191	-	-	-	-
37	15	Ryan Ellis	Rick Ware Racing	Ford	31.859	169.497	-	-	-	-
38	74	Mike Harmon	Mike Harmon Racing	Dodge	31.859	169.497	-	-		
39	78	B. J. McLeod (R)	B. J. McLeod Motorsports	Ford	32.513	166.087	-	-	-	-
40	13	Derek White	MBM Motorsports	Dodge	33.426	161.551	-	-	-	-
Failed to qualify
41	70	Derrike Cope	Derrike Cope Racing	Chevrolet	0.000	0.000	-	-	-	-
42	99	Todd Peck	B. J. McLeod Motorsports	Ford	0.000	0.000	-	-	-	-
Official qualifying results
Official starting lineup

== Race results ==
Fin	St	#	Driver	Team	Make	Laps	Led	Status	Pts
1	1	18	Kyle Busch (i)	Joe Gibbs Racing	Toyota	200	199	running	0
2	3	19	Daniel Suárez	Joe Gibbs Racing	Toyota	200	0	running	39
3	2	20	Erik Jones (R)	Joe Gibbs Racing	Toyota	200	0	running	38
4	4	88	Chase Elliott (i)	JR Motorsports	Chevrolet	200	0	running	0
5	14	2	Austin Dillon (i)	Richard Childress Racing	Chevrolet	200	0	running	0
6	5	33	Brandon Jones (R)	Richard Childress Racing	Chevrolet	200	0	running	35
7	9	3	Ty Dillon	Richard Childress Racing	Chevrolet	200	0	running	34
8	7	1	Elliott Sadler	JR Motorsports	Chevrolet	200	0	running	33
9	6	7	Justin Allgaier	JR Motorsports	Chevrolet	200	0	running	32
10	8	62	Brendan Gaughan	Richard Childress Racing	Chevrolet	200	0	running	31
11	11	48	Brennan Poole (R)	Chip Ganassi Racing	Chevrolet	200	0	running	30
12	10	98	Aric Almirola (i)	Biagi-DenBeste Racing	Ford	199	0	running	0
13	18	16	Ryan Reed	Roush Fenway Racing	Ford	198	0	running	28
14	19	39	Ryan Sieg	RSS Racing	Chevrolet	198	0	running	27
15	15	22	Brad Keselowski (i)	Team Penske	Ford	198	0	running	0
16	24	4	Ross Chastain	JD Motorsports	Chevrolet	198	0	running	25
17	21	43	Jeb Burton	Richard Petty Motorsports	Ford	198	0	running	24
18	20	01	Ryan Preece (R)	JD Motorsports	Chevrolet	197	0	running	23
19	22	24	Corey LaJoie	JGL Racing	Toyota	196	0	running	22
20	23	51	Jeremy Clements	Jeremy Clements Racing	Chevrolet	196	0	running	21
21	26	14	J. J. Yeley	TriStar Motorsports	Toyota	195	0	running	20
22	16	28	Dakoda Armstrong	JGL Racing	Toyota	194	0	running	19
23	30	44	David Starr	TriStar Motorsports	Toyota	194	0	running	18
24	25	0	Garrett Smithley (R)	JD Motorsports	Chevrolet	194	0	running	17
25	27	07	Ray Black Jr. (R)	SS-Green Light Racing	Chevrolet	192	0	running	16
26	17	11	Blake Koch	Kaulig Racing	Chevrolet	191	0	running	15
27	39	78	B. J. McLeod (R)	B. J. McLeod Motorsports	Ford	191	0	running	14
28	36	52	Joey Gase	Jimmy Means Racing	Chevrolet	189	0	running	13
29	34	90	Mario Gosselin	King Autosport	Chevrolet	188	0	running	12
30	37	15	Stanton Barrett	Rick Ware Racing	Dodge	182	0	running	11
31	38	74	Mike Harmon	Mike Harmon Racing	Dodge	182	0	running	10
32	28	97	Harrison Rhodes	Obaika Racing	Chevrolet	155	0	engine	9
33	12	6	Bubba Wallace	Roush Fenway Racing	Ford	135	1	accident	9
34	13	42	Justin Marks	Chip Ganassi Racing	Chevrolet	135	0	accident	7
35	35	25	Cody Ware (R)	Rick Ware Racing	Chevrolet	127	0	accident	6
36	40	13	Derek White	MBM Motorsports	Dodge	127	0	running	5
37	33	40	Carl Long	MBM Motorsports	Toyota	24	0	suspension	4
38	32	93	Josh Reaume	RSS Racing	Chevrolet	13	0	brakes	3
39	29	89	Morgan Shepherd	Shepherd Racing Ventures	Chevrolet	12	0	overheating	2
40	31	10	Jeff Green	TriStar Motorsports	Toyota	2	0	rear gear	1
Official race results

== Standings after the race ==
Drivers' Championship standings

Pos	Driver	Points
1	Daniel Suárez	106
2	Elliott Sadler	103 (-3)
3	Ty Dillon	99 (–7)
4	Brandon Jones	99 (–7)
5	Justin Allgaier	95 (–11)
6	Brendan Gaughan	91 (-15)
7	Erik Jones (R)	86 (-20)
8	Ryan Reed	79 (-27)
9	Ryan Sieg	73 (-33)
10	Jeb Burton	72 (-34)
11	Brennan Poole (R)	71 (-35)
11	Jeremy Clements	71 (-35)
Official driver's standings

- Note: Only the first 12 positions are included for the driver standings.

Previous race: 2016 Heads Up Georgia 250	NASCAR Xfinity Series; 2016 season	Next race: 2016 Axalta Faster. Tougher. Brighter. 200
