= C. J. Faison =

American racing driver (born 1993)

- Born: August 31, 1993 (age 33); Felton, Delaware, U.S.

YouTube information
- Channel: CJ Faison
- Years active: 14
- Genres: Horror, motorsports, personal vlogs
- Subscribers: 654,000
- Views: 136,370,985
- Last updated: August 8th, 2026

NASCAR O'Reilly Auto Parts Series career
- 2 races run over 1 year
- 2015 position: 67th
- Best finish: 67th (2015)
- First race: 2015 Buckle Up 200 (Dover)
- Last race: 2015 Great Clips 250 (Michigan)
Wins	Top tens	Poles
0	0	0

NASCAR FedEx Freight Truck Series career
- 3 races run over 2 years
- 2016 position: 67th
- Best finish: 51st (2013)
- First race: 2013 Lucas Oil 200 (Dover)
- Last race: 2016 Jacob Companies 200 (Dover)
Wins	Top tens	Poles
0	0	0

C. J. Faison (born August 31, 1993) is an American businessman, YouTuber and former stock car racing driver. The Felton, Delaware native is general manager of auction company Delaware Auto Exchange and has competed in the NASCAR Xfinity Series and Camping World Truck Series, among other series.

== Business career ==
Faison's business career started at the age of seven, sweeping floors at his father Ronald's business, Delaware Auto Exchange. C. J. took over the auction company at age 22 from his father and saw growth due to connecting with a younger demographic. Faison also serves on the board of directors of the National Association of Public Auto Auctions. Other business ventures include a mixed martial arts series, a merchandise company, a sunglasses company and a shock manufacturing company.

== YouTube career ==
On the 6th March 2012 CJ uploaded his first video to the platform drive testing at Bristol Motor speedway he would continue posting motor related videos and other personal vlogs. On the 9th January 2018 CJ uploaded his first paranormal video which is now the main content posted on his channel and currently has over 654k subscribers.

== Racing career ==
=== Grassroots series ===
Faison's racing career began at the age of four in the go-kart ranks; he later moved up to dirt sprint cars around the Delaware area.

=== K&N Pro Series East ===
In 2011, Faison attempted four races and made three in this series. In his first attempt, at South Boston Speedway, Faison failed to qualify in Rich Rudolph's No. 02 Chevrolet. For the next race, at Richmond International Raceway, Faison qualified 32nd and finished in that same place in what would be his last race for Rudolph. Faison returned eight races later in a family-owned team. At New Hampshire Motor Speedway, he qualified 35th but finished 34th after engine problems ended his race 45 laps in. In his final appearance of the season, again with his family-owned team, he qualified fourth at Dover International Speedway, a track only 14 miles away from his hometown. Once again, however, mechanical issues ended his day, as a broken shock relegated him to a 24th-place finish. In 2012, Faison logged a career-high nine starts, all for his family-owned team. With backing from Generation Rescue and Little Caesars Pizza, he logged a pole, two top-ten finishes, and two crashes. In 2013, Faison picked up backing from Sherwin-Williams, and recorded one top-five finish and one crash in six starts. He led the most laps at Dover International Speedway before blowing a tire in the late portion of the race. After the race, Faison stated that winning at Dover is his "only goal in life".

=== Camping World Truck Series ===
In 2013, Faison made his Truck debut at Dover with SS-Green Light Racing, but a crash after 61 laps ended his day. His other start in that season was at Kentucky, in SS-Green Light's No. 81 truck. He finished 19th, one lap off the pace. A deal to drive Premium Motorsports' No. 94 truck in 2015 fell through. In 2016, Faison returned to SS-Green Light Racing, piloting the No. 07 truck at Dover to a 25th-place finish, ten laps down. The opportunity came after Dotter called Faison earlier in the week to drive, hoping to keep the truck's position in owner points.

=== Xfinity Series ===
Faison debuted in the Xfinity Series in 2015, driving JGL Racing's No. 26 Toyota Camry at Dover. He started 37th and finished 23rd.

=== Other series ===
In 2023, Faison got the opportunity to make his off-road racing debut, driving a trophy truck in the Mint 400.

== Motorsports career results ==
=== NASCAR ===
(key) (Bold – Pole position awarded by qualifying time. Italics – Pole position earned by points standings or practice time. * – Most laps led.)

==== Xfinity Series ====
NASCAR Xfinity Series results
Year	Team	No.	Make	1	2	3	4	5	6	7	8	9	10	11	12	13	14	15	16	17	18	19	20	21	22	23	24	25	26	27	28	29	30	31	32	33	NXSC	Pts	Ref
2015	JGL Racing	26	Toyota	DAY	ATL	LVS	PHO	CAL	TEX	BRI	RCH	TAL	IOW	CLT	DOV; 23	MCH; 40	CHI	DAY	KEN	NHA	IND	IOW	GLN	MOH	BRI	ROA	DAR	RCH	CHI	KEN	DOV	CLT	KAN	TEX	PHO	HOM	67th	25	

==== Camping World Truck Series ====
NASCAR Camping World Truck Series results
Year	Team	No.	Make	1	2	3	4	5	6	7	8	9	10	11	12	13	14	15	16	17	18	19	20	21	22	23	NCWTC	Pts	Ref
2013	SS-Green Light Racing	07	Chevy	DAY	MAR	CAR	KAN	CLT	DOV; 30	TEX																	51st	39	
2013	SS-Green Light Racing	81	Toyota								KEN; 19	IOW	ELD	POC	MCH	BRI	MSP	IOW	CHI	LVS	TAL	MAR	TEX	PHO	HOM		51st	39	
2016	SS-Green Light Racing	07	Chevy	DAY	ATL	MAR	KAN	DOV; 25	CLT	TEX	IOW	GTW	KEN	ELD	POC	BRI	MCH	MSP	CHI	NHA	LVS	TAL	MAR	TEX	PHO	HOM	67th	8	

==== K&N Pro Series East ====
NASCAR K&N Pro Series East results
Year	Team	No.	Make	1	2	3	4	5	6	7	8	9	10	11	12	13	14	NKNPSEC	Pts	Ref
2011	Rich Rudolph	02	Chevrolet	GRE	SBO; DNQ	RCH; 32												37th	289	
2011	Ronald Faison	39	Chevrolet				IOW	BGS	JFC	LGY	NHA	COL	GRE	NHA; 34	DOV; 24			37th	289	
2012	Ronald Faison	39	Chevrolet	BRI; 27	GRE; 15	RCH; 24	IOW; 20	BGS	JFC; 10	LGY	CNB	COL	IOW; 16	NHA; 26	DOV; 7	GRE	**CAR**; 11	18th	240	
2013	Ronald Faison	39	Chevrolet	BRI; 5	GRE; 11	FIF; 14	RCH; 11	BGS; 14	IOW	LGY	COL	IOW	VIR	GRE	NHA	DOV; 24*	RAL	21st	187	

^{*} Season still in progress
^{1} Ineligible for series points
