= 2015 Food City 300 =

22nd race in the 2015 NASCAR Xfinity Series

Race details
- Race 22 of 33 of the 2015 NASCAR Xfinity Series
- Date: August 21, 2015
- Location: Bristol Motor Speedway, Bristol, Tennessee
- Course: Permanent racing facility
- Course length: 0.533 miles (0.858 km)
- Distance: 302 laps,
- Scheduled distance: 300 laps, 500 mi (804.672 km)
- Average speed: 86.27 miles per hour (138.84 km/h)

Pole position
| Driver | Denny Hamlin | Joe Gibbs Racing |
- Time: 15.121

Most laps led
| Driver | Denny Hamlin | Joe Gibbs Racing |
- Laps: 106

Winner
| No. 54 | Kyle Busch | Joe Gibbs Racing |

Television in the United States
- Network: NBCSN
- Announcers: Rick Allen, Jeff Burton, Steve Letarte

The 2015 Food City 300 was the 22nd stock car race of the 2015 NASCAR Xfinity Series and the 34th iteration of the event. The race was held on Friday, August 21, 2015, at Bristol Motor Speedway a 0.533 miles (0.858 km) permanent oval-shaped racetrack in Bristol, Tennessee. Denny Hamlin dominated the race, but his Joe Gibbs Racing teammate Kyle Busch took the win in an overtime finish. Rounding out the top 3, Kyle Larson finished 2nd, and Hamlin finished 3rd.

== Entry list ==
- (R) denotes a rookie driver
- (I) Ineligible for points

| No | Driver | Team | Manufacturer |
|---|---|---|---|
| 0 | Harrison Rhodes (R) | JD Motorsports | Chevrolet |
| 1 | Elliott Sadler | Roush–Fenway Racing | Ford |
| 01 | Landon Cassill | JD Motorsports | Chevrolet |
| 2 | Brian Scott | Richard Childress Racing | Chevrolet |
| 3 | Ty Dillon | Richard Childress Racing | Chevrolet |
| 4 | Ross Chastain (R) | JD Motorsports | Chevrolet |
| 6 | Bubba Wallace (R) | Roush–Fenway Racing | Ford |
| 7 | Regan Smith | JR Motorsports | Chevrolet |
| 8 | Blake Koch | TriStar Motorsports | Toyota |
| 9 | Chase Elliott | JR Motorsports | Chevrolet |
| 13 | Brad Teague | MBM Motorsports | Toyota |
| 14 | Cale Conley (R) | TriStar Motorsports | Toyota |
| 15 | Ryan Ellis (I) | Rick Ware Racing | Chevrolet |
| 16 | Ryan Reed | Roush–Fenway Racing | Ford |
| 18 | Daniel Suárez (R) | Joe Gibbs Racing | Toyota |
| 19 | Jeff Green | TriStar Motorsports | Toyota |
| 20 | Denny Hamlin (I) | Joe Gibbs Racing | Toyota |
| 22 | Ryan Blaney | Team Penske | Ford |
| 24 | Eric McClure | TriStar Motorsports | Toyota |
| 25 | John Wes Townley (I) | Athenian Motorsports | Chevrolet |
| 26 | Hermie Sadler | JGL Racing | Toyota |
| 28 | J. J. Yeley | JGL Racing | Toyota |
| 33 | Brandon Jones (I) | Richard Childress Racing | Chevrolet |
| 39 | Ryan Sieg | RSS Racing | Chevrolet |
| 40 | Carl Long | MBM Motorsports | Dodge |
| 42 | Kyle Larson (I) | HScott Motorsports | Chevrolet |
| 43 | Dakoda Armstrong | Richard Petty Motorsports | Ford |
| 44 | David Starr | TriStar Motorsports | Toyota |
| 51 | Jeremy Clements | Jeremy Clements Racing | Chevrolet |
| 52 | Joey Gase | Jimmy Means Racing | Chevrolet |
| 54 | Kyle Busch (I) | Joe Gibbs Racing | Toyota |
| 60 | Chris Buescher | Roush–Fenway Racing | Ford |
| 62 | Brendan Gaughan | Richard Childress Racing | Chevrolet |
| 66 | Benny Gordon | PEG Racing | Toyota |
| 70 | Derrike Cope | Derrike Cope Racing | Chevrolet |
| 74 | Jordan Anderson (I) | Mike Harmon Racing | Dodge |
| 88 | Kevin Harvick (I) | JR Motorsports | Chevrolet |
| 89 | Morgan Shepherd | Shepherd Racing Ventures | Chevrolet |
| 90 | Mario Gosselin | King Autosport | Chevrolet |
| 97 | Dylan Kwasniewski | Obaika Racing | Chevrolet |

== Qualifying ==
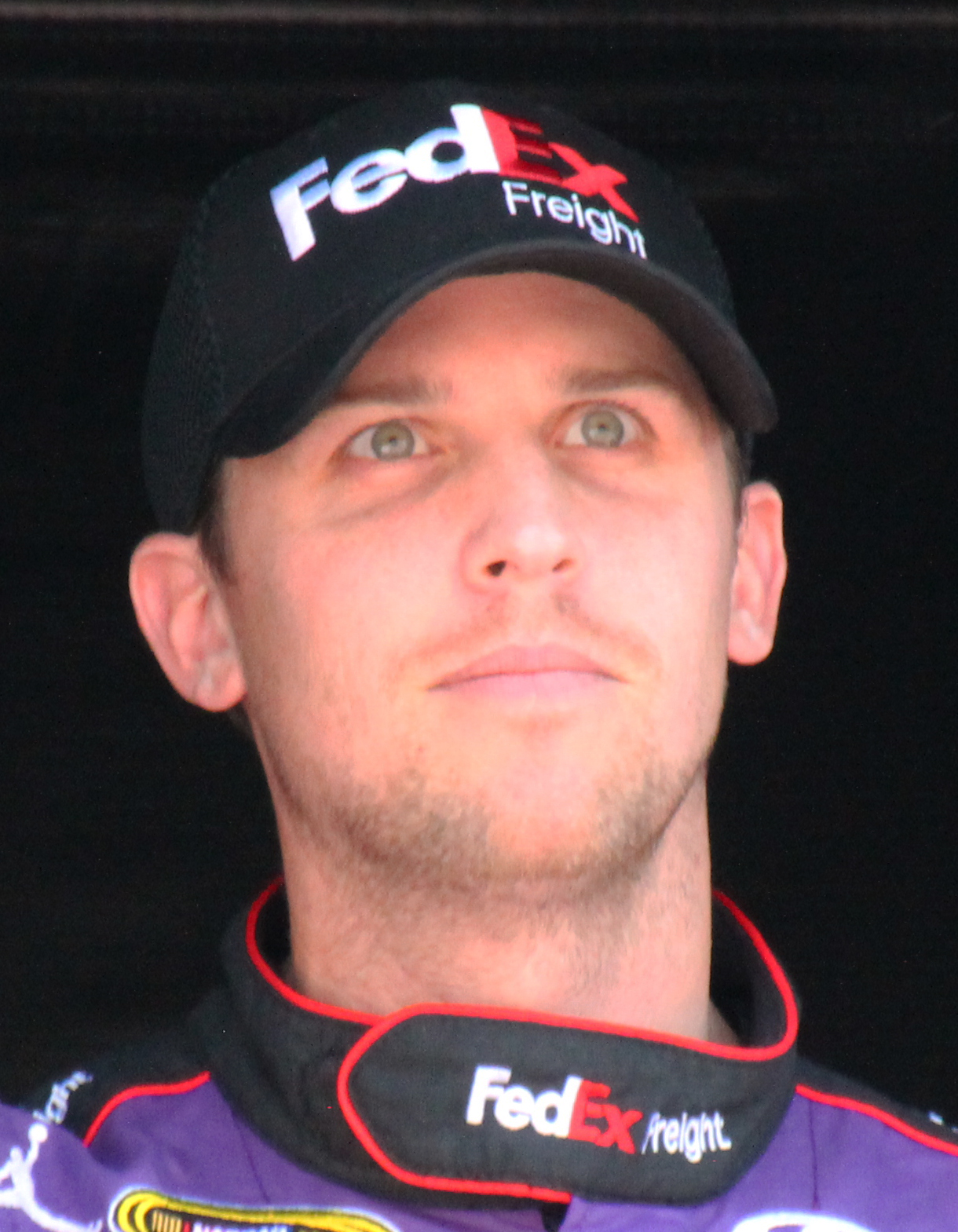
Denny Hamlin won the pole

| Grid | No | Driver | Team | Manufacturer | Time | Speed |
|---|---|---|---|---|---|---|
| 1 | 20 | Denny Hamlin | Joe Gibbs Racing | Toyota | 15.121 | 126.896 |
| 2 | 54 | Kyle Busch | Joe Gibbs Racing | Toyota | 15.191 | 126.312 |
| 3 | 88 | Kevin Harvick | JR Motorsports | Chevrolet | 15.226 | 126.021 |
| 4 | 2 | Brian Scott | Richard Childress Racing | Chevrolet | 15.229 | 125.996 |
| 5 | 60 | Chris Buescher | Roush–Fenway Racing | Ford | 15.265 | 125.699 |
| 6 | 22 | Ryan Blaney | Team Penske | Ford | 15.296 | 125.445 |
| 7 | 42 | Kyle Larson | HScott Motorsports | Chevrolet | 15.312 | 125.313 |
| 8 | 1 | Elliott Sadler | Roush–Fenway Racing | Ford | 15.355 | 124.963 |
| 9 | 18 | Daniel Suárez | Joe Gibbs Racing | Toyota | 15.361 | 124.914 |
| 10 | 9 | Chase Elliott | JR Motorsports | Chevrolet | 15.388 | 124.695 |
| 11 | 3 | Ty Dillon | Richard Childress Racing | Chevrolet | 15.493 | 123.849 |
| 12 | 7 | Regan Smith | JR Motorsports | Chevrolet | 15.495 | 123.833 |
| 13 | 33 | Brandon Jones | Richard Childress Racing | Chevrolet | 15.461 | 124.106 |
| 14 | 6 | Bubba Wallace | Roush–Fenway Racing | Ford | 15.480 | 123.953 |
| 15 | 62 | Brendan Gaughan | Richard Childress Racing | Chevrolet | 15.498 | 123.810 |
| 16 | 01 | Landon Cassill | JD Motorsports | Chevrolet | 15.499 | 123.802 |
| 17 | 16 | Ryan Reed | Roush–Fenway Racing | Ford | 15.570 | 123.237 |
| 18 | 28 | J. J. Yeley | JGL Racing | Toyota | 15.600 | 123.000 |
| 19 | 39 | Ryan Sieg | RSS Racing | Chevrolet | 15.611 | 122.913 |
| 20 | 14 | Cale Conley | TriStar Motorsports | Toyota | 15.616 | 122.874 |
| 21 | 4 | Ross Chastain | JD Motorsports | Chevrolet | 15.706 | 122.170 |
| 22 | 43 | Dakoda Armstrong | Richard Petty Motorsports | Ford | 15.720 | 122.061 |
| 23 | 0 | Harrison Rhodes | JD Motorsports | Chevrolet | 15.726 | 122.014 |
| 24 | 25 | John Wes Townley | Athenian Motorsports | Chevrolet | 15.802 | 121.428 |
| 25 | 26 | Hermie Sadler | JGL Racing | Toyota | 15.717 | 122.084 |
| 26 | 66 | Benny Gordon | PEG Racing | Toyota | 15.722 | 122.046 |
| 27 | 51 | Jeremy Clements | Jeremy Clements Racing | Chevrolet | 15.744 | 121.875 |
| 28 | 97 | Dylan Kwasniewski | Obaika Racing | Chevrolet | 15.759 | 121.759 |
| 29 | 8 | Blake Koch | TriStar Motorsports | Toyota | 15.792 | 121.505 |
| 30 | 90 | ^{1} Mario Gosselin | King Autosport | Chevrolet | 15.804 | 121.412 |
| 31 | 19 | Jeff Green | TriStar Motorsports | Toyota | 15.854 | 121.029 |
| 32 | 44 | David Starr | TriStar Motorsports | Toyota | 15.924 | 120.497 |
| 33 | 52 | Joey Gase | Jimmy Means Racing | Chevrolet | 15.949 | 120.308 |
Qualified via Owner Points
| 34 | 24 | Eric McClure | TriStar Motorsports | Toyota | 15.954 | 120.271 |
| 35 | 40 | Carl Long | MBM Motorsports | Dodge | 16.025 | 119.738 |
| 36 | 70 | Derrike Cope | Derrike Cope Racing | Chevrolet | 16.156 | 118.767 |
| 37 | 15 | Ryan Ellis | Rick Ware Racing | Chevrolet | 16.249 | 118.087 |
| 38 | 74 | Jordan Anderson | Mike Harmon Racing | Dodge | 16.326 | 117.530 |
| 39 | 89 | Morgan Shepherd | Shepherd Racing Ventures | Chevrolet | 16.351 | 117.351 |
| 40 | 13 | Brad Teague | MBM Motorsports | Toyota | 16.383 | 117.121 |
Official qualifying result

- Notes: ^{1} – Mario Gosselin had to go to the rear for unapproved adjustments.

== Race results ==
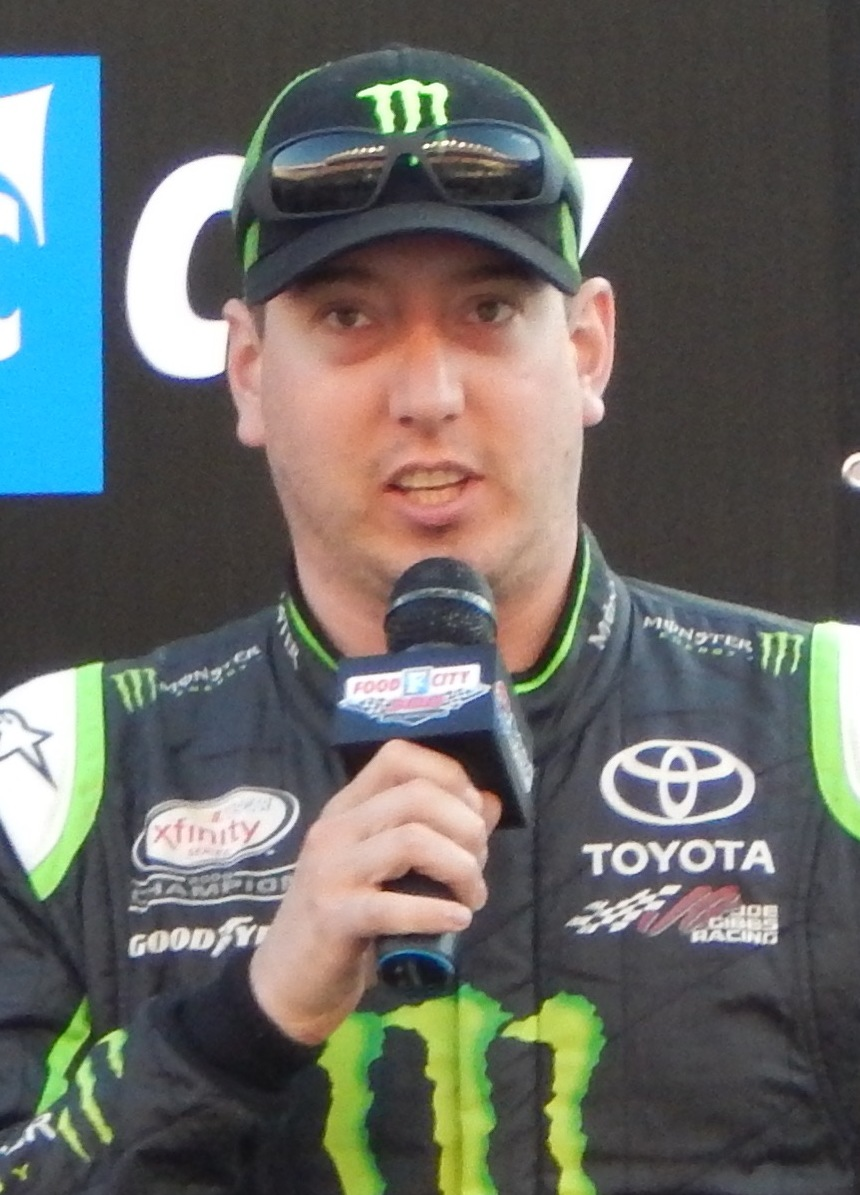
Kyle busch won the race on a overtime finish.

| Pos | No | Driver | Team | Manufacturer | Laps | Status | Points |
|---|---|---|---|---|---|---|---|
| 1 | 54 | Kyle Busch | Joe Gibbs Racing | Toyota | 302 | running | 0 |
| 2 | 42 | Kyle Larson | HScott Motorsports | Chevrolet | 302 | running | 0 |
| 3 | 20 | Denny Hamlin | Joe Gibbs Racing | Toyota | 302 | running | 0 |
| 4 | 3 | Ty Dillon | Richard Childress Racing | Chevrolet | 302 | running | 40 |
| 5 | 18 | Daniel Suárez | Joe Gibbs Racing | Toyota | 302 | running | 39 |
| 6 | 2 | Brian Scott | Richard Childress Racing | Chevrolet | 302 | running | 38 |
| 7 | 9 | Chase Elliott | JR Motorsports | Chevrolet | 302 | running | 37 |
| 8 | 88 | Kevin Harvick | JR Motorsports | Chevrolet | 302 | running | 0 |
| 9 | 7 | Regan Smith | JR Motorsports | Chevrolet | 302 | running | 35 |
| 10 | 62 | Brendan Gaughan | Richard Childress Racing | Chevrolet | 302 | running | 34 |
| 11 | 60 | Chris Buescher | Roush–Fenway Racing | Ford | 302 | running | 35 |
| 12 | 6 | Bubba Wallace | Roush–Fenway Racing | Ford | 302 | running | 32 |
| 13 | 33 | Brandon Jones | Richard Childress Racing | Chevrolet | 302 | running | 0 |
| 14 | 51 | Jeremy Clements | Jeremy Clements Racing | Chevrolet | 302 | running | 30 |
| 15 | 01 | Landon Cassill | JD Motorsports | Chevrolet | 302 | running | 29 |
| 16 | 39 | Ryan Sieg | RSS Racing | Chevrolet | 302 | running | 28 |
| 17 | 4 | Ross Chastain | JD Motorsports | Chevrolet | 302 | running | 27 |
| 18 | 14 | Cale Conley | TriStar Motorsports | Toyota | 301 | running | 26 |
| 19 | 28 | J. J. Yeley | JGL Racing | Toyota | 299 | running | 25 |
| 20 | 44 | David Starr | TriStar Motorsports | Toyota | 298 | running | 24 |
| 21 | 8 | Blake Koch | TriStar Motorsports | Toyota | 298 | running | 23 |
| 22 | 22 | Ryan Blaney | Team Penske | Ford | 297 | running | 22 |
| 23 | 25 | John Wes Townley | Athenian Motorsports | Chevrolet | 297 | running | 0 |
| 24 | 43 | Dakoda Armstrong | Richard Petty Motorsports | Ford | 297 | running | 20 |
| 25 | 16 | Ryan Reed | Roush–Fenway Racing | Ford | 295 | running | 19 |
| 26 | 13 | Brad Teague | MBM Motorsports | Toyota | 291 | running | 18 |
| 27 | 52 | Joey Gase | Jimmy Means Racing | Chevrolet | 289 | running | 17 |
| 28 | 15 | Ryan Ellis | Rick Ware Racing | Chevrolet | 288 | running | 0 |
| 29 | 26 | Hermie Sadler | JGL Racing | Toyota | 287 | running | 15 |
| 30 | 70 | Derrike Cope | Derrike Cope Racing | Chevrolet | 275 | running | 14 |
| 31 | 1 | Elliott Sadler | Roush–Fenway Racing | Ford | 254 | crash | 13 |
| 32 | 97 | Dylan Kwasniewski | Obaika Racing | Chevrolet | 253 | crash | 12 |
| 33 | 24 | Eric McClure | TriStar Motorsports | Toyota | 252 | running | 11 |
| 34 | 0 | Harrison Rhodes | JD Motorsports | Chevrolet | 247 | crash | 10 |
| 35 | 90 | Mario Gosselin | King Autosport | Chevrolet | 180 | handling | 9 |
| 36 | 74 | Jordan Anderson | Mike Harmon Racing | Dodge | 170 | running | 0 |
| 37 | 66 | Benny Gordon | PEG Racing | Toyota | 65 | electrical | 7 |
| 38 | 89 | Morgan Shepherd | Shepherd Racing Ventures | Chevrolet | 28 | brakes | 6 |
| 39 | 40 | Carl Long | MBM Motorsports | Dodge | 22 | handling | 5 |
| 40 | 19 | Jeff Green | TriStar Motorsports | Toyota | 3 | vibration | 4 |
Race Results

=== Race statistics ===
- 10 lead changes among 4 different drivers
- 8 cautions for 52 laps
- Time of race: 1 hour, 51 minute, 57 seconds
- Average speed: 86.27 mph (138.84 km/h)

Lap Leaders
| Laps | Leader |
|---|---|
| 1–2 | Denny Hamlin |
| 3–12 | Kyle Busch |
| 13–26 | Denny Hamlin |
| 27–54 | Kyle Busch |
| 55 | Denny Hamlin |
| 56–104 | Kyle Busch |
| 105–124 | Denny Hamlin |
| 125 | Kevin Harvick |
| 126–194 | Denny Hamlin |
| 195–300 | Chris Buescher |
| 301–302 | Kyle Busch |

Total laps led
| Leader | Laps |
|---|---|
| Denny Hamlin | 106 |
| Chris Buescher | 106 |
| Kyle Busch | 89 |
| Kevin Harvick | 1 |

== Standings after the race ==
=== Drivers' Championship standings ===
| | Pos | Driver | Points |
|---|---|---|---|
| | 1 | Chris Buescher | 800 |
| | 2 | Ty Dillon | 781 (–19) |
| | 3 | Chase Elliott | 777 (–23) |
| | 4 | Regan Smith | 749 (–51) |
| | 5 | Elliott Sadler | 718 (–82) |
| 1 | 6 | Daniel Suárez | 697 (–103) |
| 1 | 6 | Bubba Wallace | 697 (–103) |
| | 8 | Brian Scott | 681 (–119) |
| | 9 | Brendan Gaughan | 676 (–124) |
| | 10 | Ryan Reed | 606 (–194) |
| | 11 | Jeremy Clements | 567 (–233) |
| | 12 | J. J. Yeley | 536 (–264) |

- Note: Only the first 12 positions are included for the driver standings.

| Previous race: 2015 Nationwide Children's Hospital 200 | NASCAR Xfinity Series; 2015 season | Next race: 2015 Road America 180 |
