= 2015 NASCAR Xfinity Series =

American motorsport season

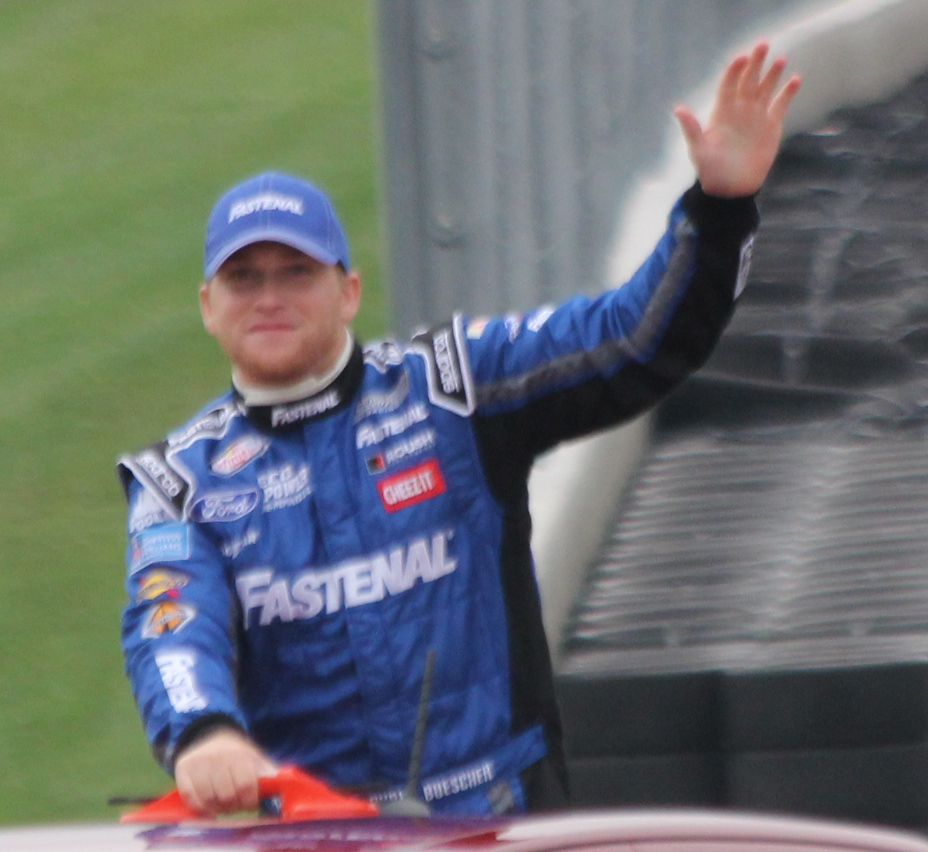
Chris Buescher, the 2015 Xfinity Series champion.

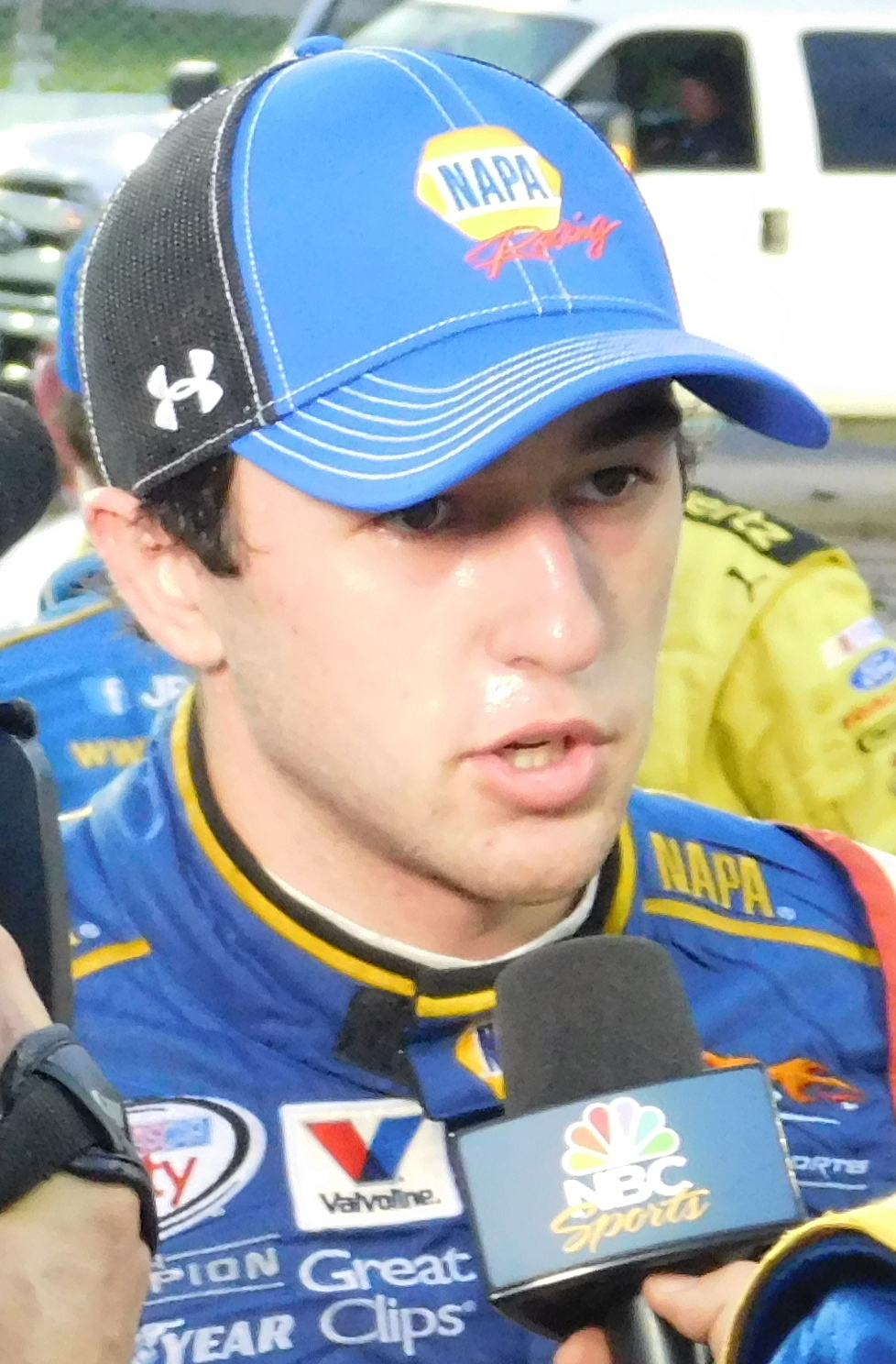
Defending series champion Chase Elliott finished second behind Buescher in the championship by just 15 points.

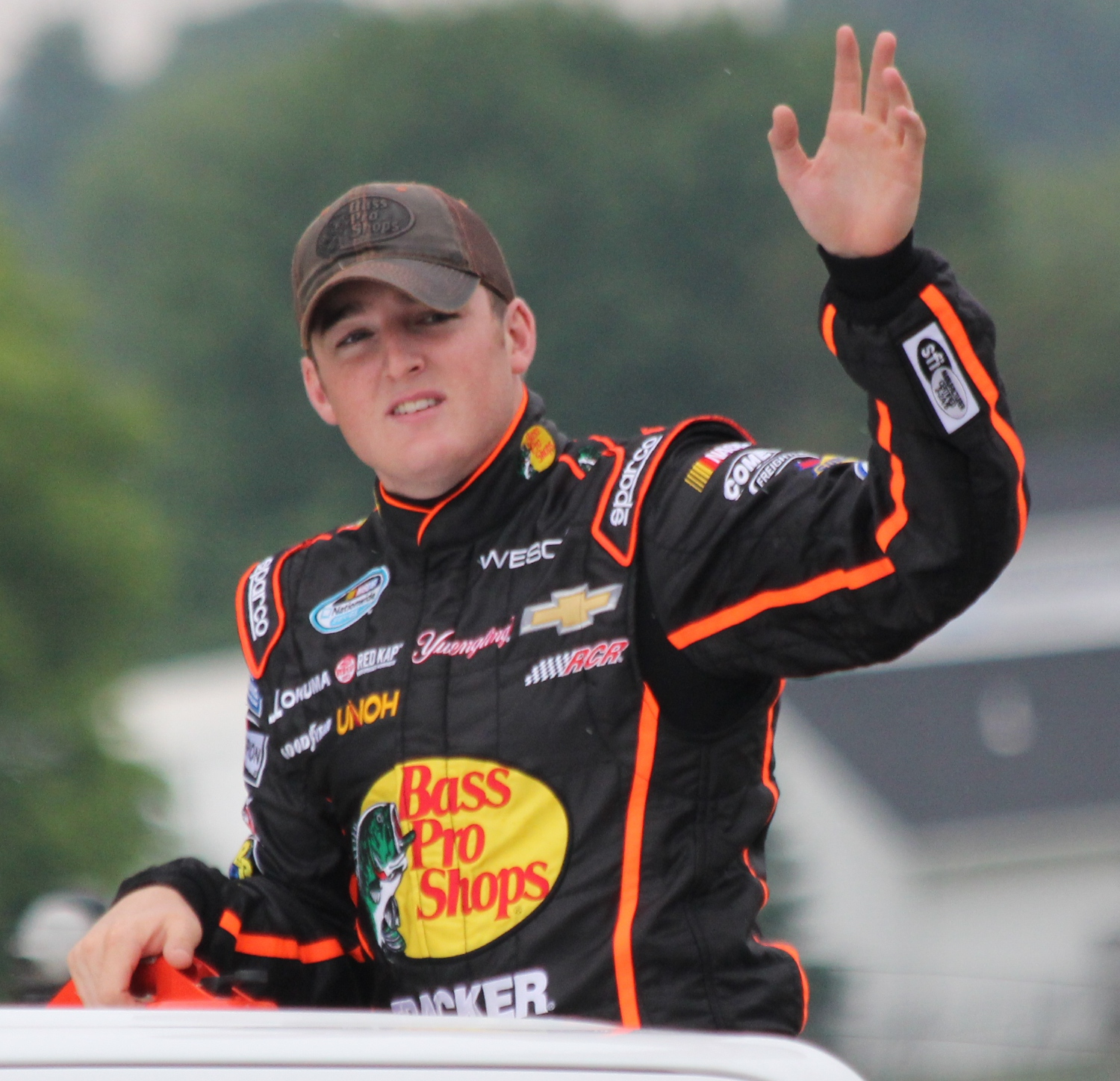
Ty Dillon finished third in the championship, 18 points behind Buescher.

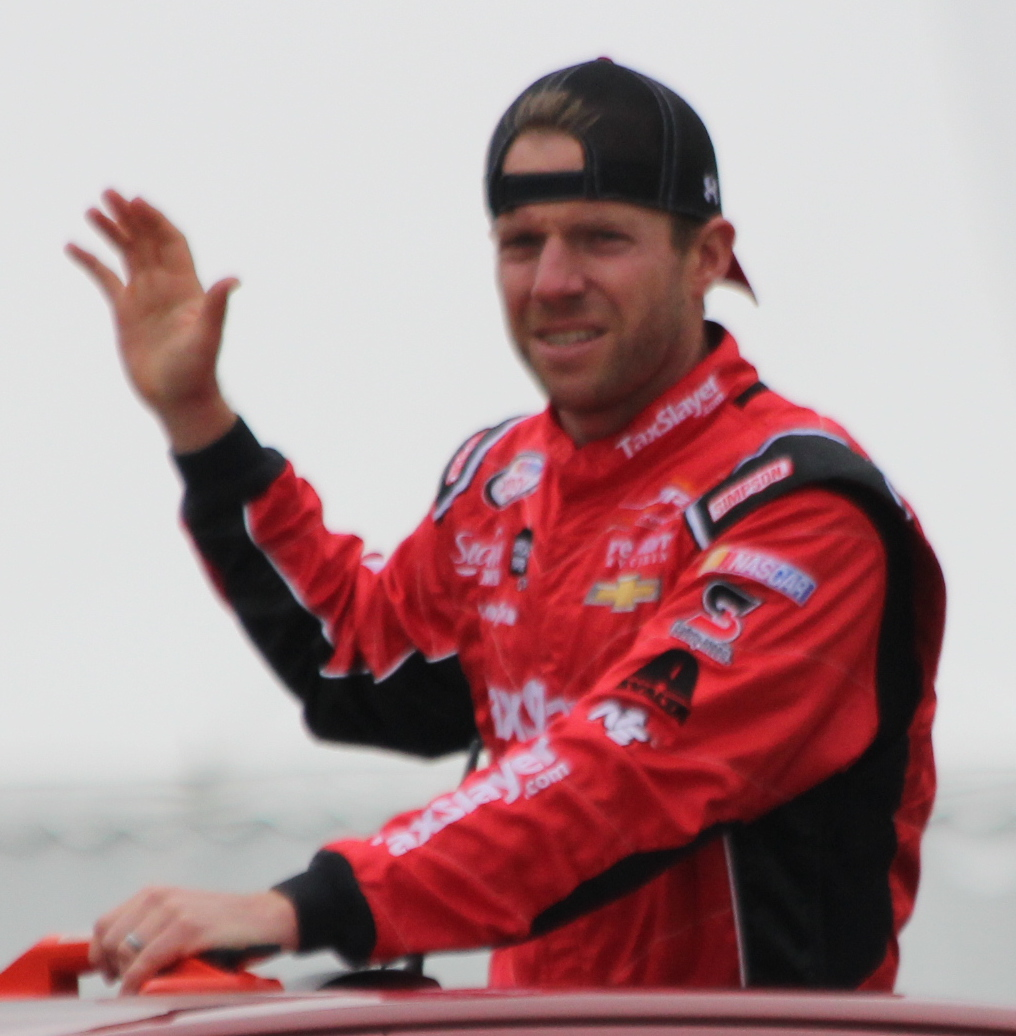
Regan Smith finished fourth in the championship, 22 points behind.

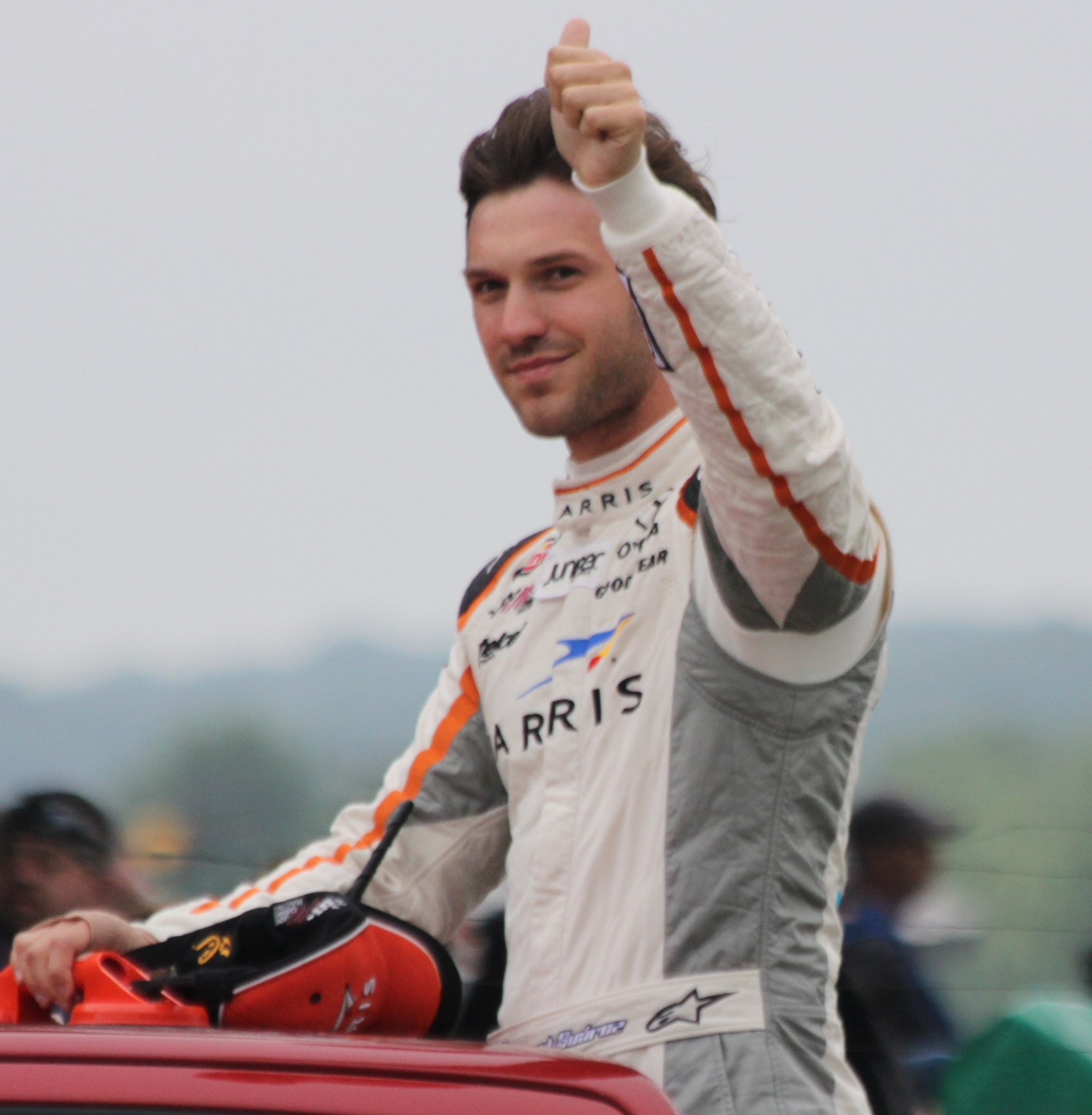
Daniel Suárez finished fifth in the championship, 112 points behind, and also won the Rookie of the Year title.

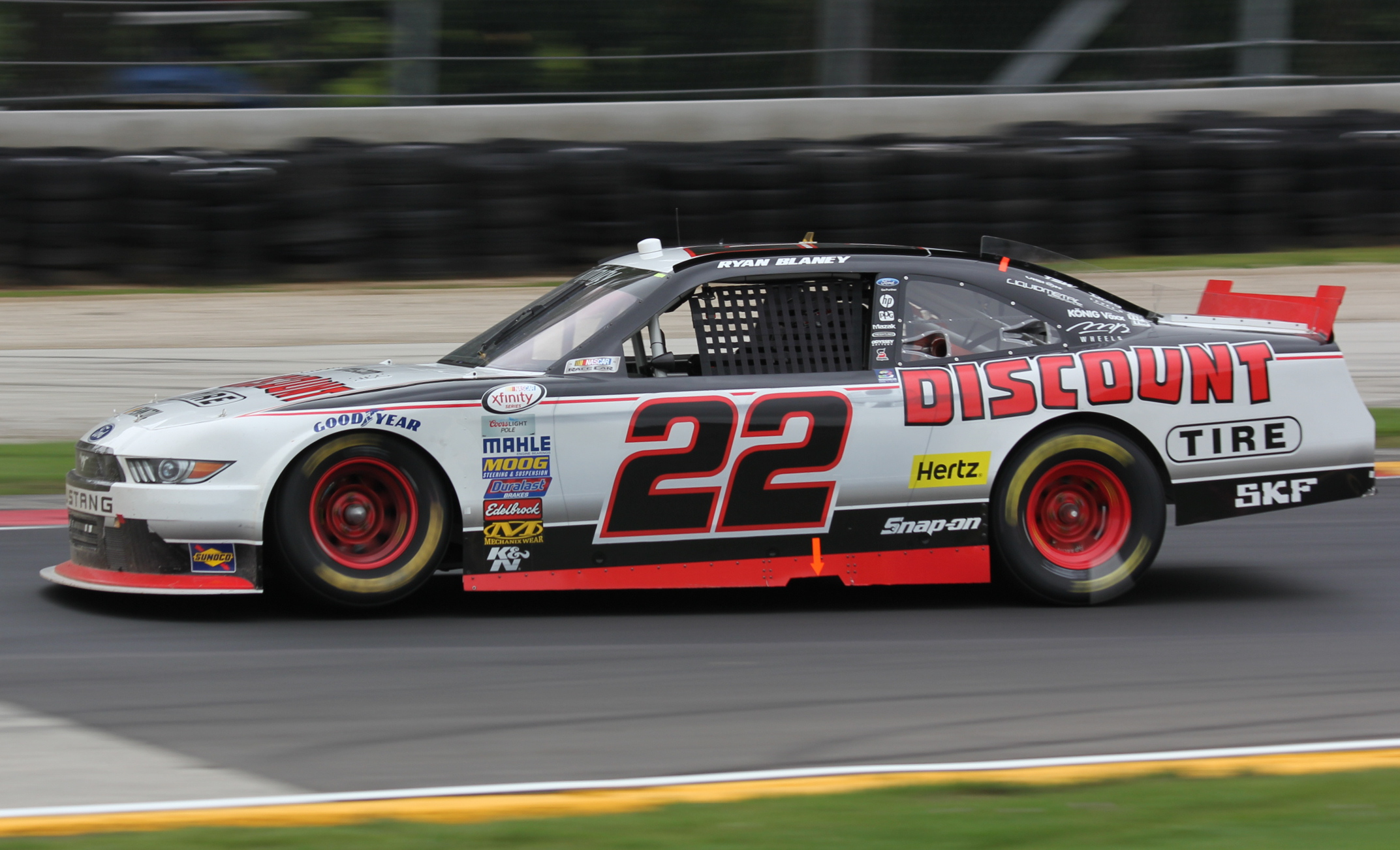
The No. 22 car of Team Penske won the Owners' championship.

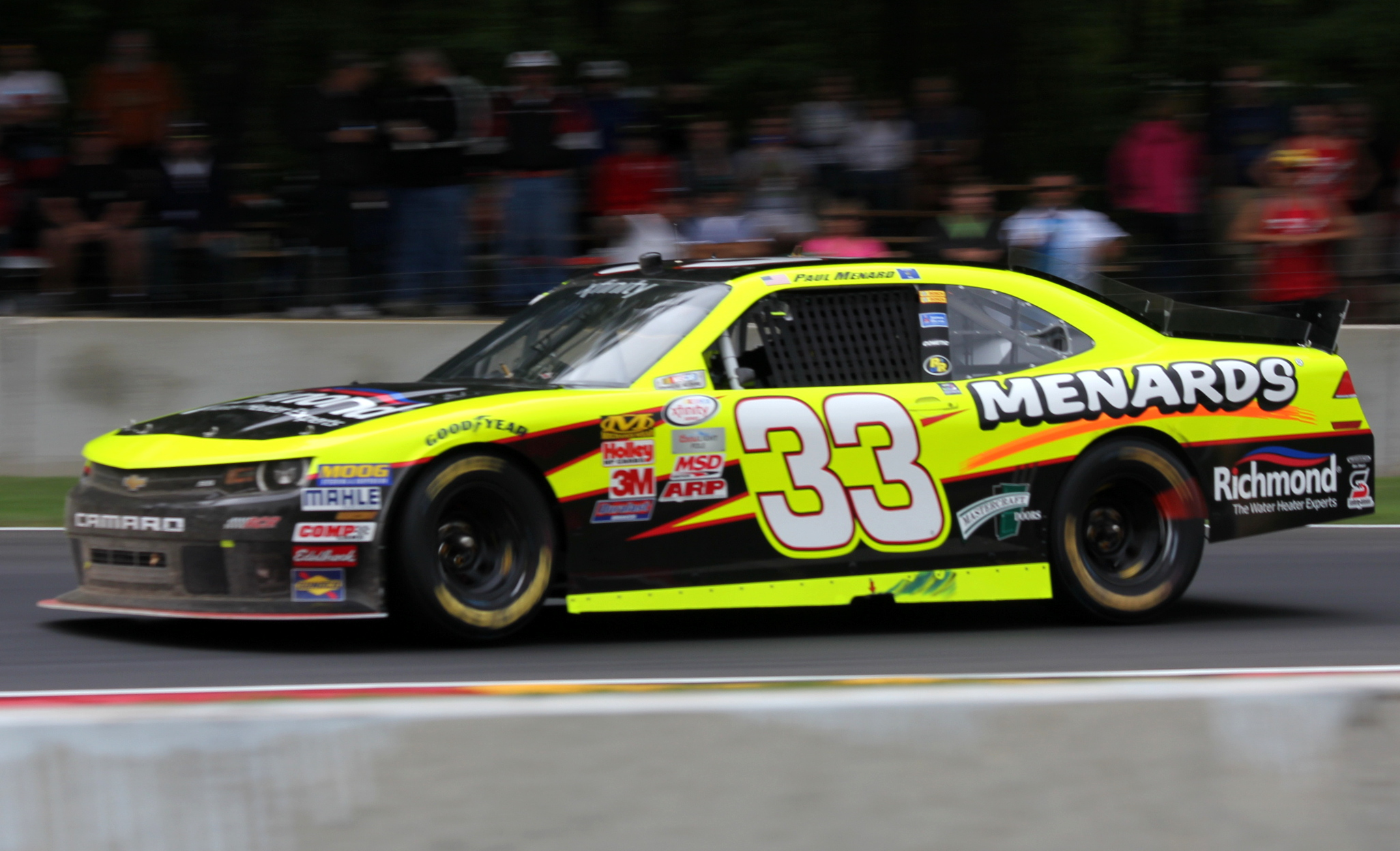
Chevrolet won the Manufacturer's championship with 11 wins and 1434 points.

The 2015 NASCAR Xfinity Series was the 34th season of the NASCAR Xfinity Series, the second national professional stock car racing series sanctioned by NASCAR in the United States. It began with the Alert Today Florida 300 at Daytona International Speedway on February 21, and ended with the Ford EcoBoost 300 at Homestead-Miami Speedway on November 21. Chase Elliott entered the 2015 season as the defending series champion. Chris Buescher won the championship. The 2015 season marked two major changes; Comcast's cable brand Xfinity replaced Nationwide Insurance as title sponsor of the series, while Fox, Fox Sports 1, NBC and NBCSN broadcast the series' races, replacing the ESPN networks and ABC.

== Teams and drivers ==
=== Complete schedule ===
Manufacturer	Team	No.	Race driver	Crew chief
Chevrolet	Derrike Cope Racing	70	Derrike Cope 29	Dan Kolanda
Chevrolet	Derrike Cope Racing	70	Matt Frahm 1	Dan Kolanda
Chevrolet	Derrike Cope Racing	70	Matt Waltz 2	Dan Kolanda
Chevrolet	Derrike Cope Racing	70	Garrett Smithley 1	Dan Kolanda
Chevrolet	HScott Motorsports with Chip Ganassi	42	Kyle Larson 14	Mike Shiplett
Chevrolet	HScott Motorsports with Chip Ganassi	42	Brennan Poole 17	Mike Shiplett
Chevrolet	HScott Motorsports with Chip Ganassi	42	Justin Marks 2	Mike Shiplett
Chevrolet	JD Motorsports	0	Harrison Rhodes (R) 26	Todd Myers
Chevrolet	JD Motorsports	0	Bobby Gerhart 1	Todd Myers
Chevrolet	JD Motorsports	0	Michael Self 4	Todd Myers
Chevrolet	JD Motorsports	0	Lawson Aschenbach 1	Todd Myers
Chevrolet	JD Motorsports	0	Josh Reaume 1	Todd Myers
Chevrolet	JD Motorsports	01	Landon Cassill 29	Dave Fuge 4 Ryan Michael 6 Wayne Setterington 22
Chevrolet	JD Motorsports	01	Ross Chastain (R) 2	Dave Fuge 4 Ryan Michael 6 Wayne Setterington 22
Chevrolet	JD Motorsports	01	Michael Self 2	Dave Fuge 4 Ryan Michael 6 Wayne Setterington 22
Chevrolet	JD Motorsports	4	Ross Chastain (R) 31	Gary Cogswell
Chevrolet	JD Motorsports	4	Harrison Rhodes (R) 1	Gary Cogswell
Chevrolet	JD Motorsports	4	Michael Self 1	Gary Cogswell
Chevrolet	Jeremy Clements Racing	51	Jeremy Clements	Tony Clements
Chevrolet	Jimmy Means Racing	52	Joey Gase	Timothy Brown
Chevrolet	JR Motorsports	7	Regan Smith	Jason Burdett
Chevrolet	JR Motorsports	9	Chase Elliott	Ernie Cope
Chevrolet	JR Motorsports	88	Dale Earnhardt Jr. 4	Dave Elenz
Chevrolet	JR Motorsports	88	Kevin Harvick 12	Dave Elenz
Chevrolet	JR Motorsports	88	Kasey Kahne 6	Dave Elenz
Chevrolet	JR Motorsports	88	Ben Rhodes 10	Dave Elenz
Chevrolet	JR Motorsports	88	Josh Berry 1	Dave Elenz
Chevrolet	King Autosport	90	Mario Gosselin 11	Guy Caron 6 Danny Gill 6 Bryan Berry 3 Mario Gosselin 2 Shannon Rursch 1
Chevrolet	King Autosport	90	Martin Roy 7	Guy Caron 6 Danny Gill 6 Bryan Berry 3 Mario Gosselin 2 Shannon Rursch 1
Chevrolet	SS-Green Light Racing 13; Rick Ware Racing 2	90	Jimmy Weller III 6	Jason Miller
Chevrolet	SS-Green Light Racing 13; Rick Ware Racing 2	90	Todd Bodine 4	Jason Miller
Chevrolet	SS-Green Light Racing 13; Rick Ware Racing 2	90	Tyler Young 1	Jason Miller
Chevrolet	SS-Green Light Racing 13; Rick Ware Racing 2	90	B. J. McLeod 1	Jason Miller
Chevrolet	SS-Green Light Racing 13; Rick Ware Racing 2	90	Andy Lally 2	Jason Miller
Chevrolet	SS-Green Light Racing 13; Rick Ware Racing 2	90	Korbin Forrister 1	Jason Miller
Chevrolet	Obaika Racing	97	Josh Reaume (R) 3	Dan Stillman 9 Barry Deel 1 John Monsam 23
Chevrolet	Obaika Racing	97	Peyton Sellers (R) 16	Dan Stillman 9 Barry Deel 1 John Monsam 23
Chevrolet	Obaika Racing	97	Johanna Long 1	Dan Stillman 9 Barry Deel 1 John Monsam 23
Chevrolet	Obaika Racing	97	Dylan Kwasniewski 6	Dan Stillman 9 Barry Deel 1 John Monsam 23
Chevrolet	Obaika Racing	97	Parker Kligerman 1	Dan Stillman 9 Barry Deel 1 John Monsam 23
Chevrolet	Obaika Racing	97	Mason Mingus 4	Dan Stillman 9 Barry Deel 1 John Monsam 23
Chevrolet	Obaika Racing	97	Ryan Ellis 2	Dan Stillman 9 Barry Deel 1 John Monsam 23
Chevrolet	Richard Childress Racing	2	Brian Scott	Mike Hillman Jr.
Chevrolet	Richard Childress Racing	3	Ty Dillon	Danny Stockman Jr. 14; Nick Harrison 19
Chevrolet	Richard Childress Racing	33	Austin Dillon 20	Nick Harrison 14; Danny Stockman Jr. 19
Chevrolet	Richard Childress Racing	33	Paul Menard 8	Nick Harrison 14; Danny Stockman Jr. 19
Chevrolet	Richard Childress Racing	33	Brandon Jones 5	Nick Harrison 14; Danny Stockman Jr. 19
Chevrolet	Richard Childress Racing	62	Brendan Gaughan	Shane Wilson
Chevrolet	RSS Racing	39	Ryan Sieg	Kevin Starland 32; Rod Sieg 1
Ford	Richard Petty Motorsports	43	Dakoda Armstrong	Frank Kerr
Ford	Roush Fenway Racing	1	Elliott Sadler	Phil Gould
Ford	Roush Fenway Racing	6	Bubba Wallace (R)	Chad Norris 20; Seth Barbour 13
Ford	Roush Fenway Racing	16	Ryan Reed	Seth Barbour 20; Chad Norris 13
Ford	Roush Fenway Racing	60	Chris Buescher	Scott Graves
Ford	Team Penske	22	Brad Keselowski 9	Greg Erwin
Ford	Team Penske	22	Joey Logano 10	Greg Erwin
Ford	Team Penske	22	Ryan Blaney 13	Greg Erwin
Ford	Team Penske	22	Alex Tagliani 1	Greg Erwin
Toyota	JGL Racing	28	J. J. Yeley	Steve Plattenberger 14; Steve Lane 19
Toyota	JGL Racing	24	Eric McClure 9	Steve Lane 9
Toyota	TriStar Motorsports	24	Eric McClure 24	Wes Ward 5 Paul Clapprood 1 Rick Ren 18
Toyota	TriStar Motorsports	8	Blake Koch	Bruce Cook 7 Matthew Lucas 20; Ricky Viers 2 Nick Hutchins 4
Toyota	TriStar Motorsports	14	Cale Conley (R) 30	Eddie Pardue
Toyota	TriStar Motorsports	14	Mike Bliss 3	Eddie Pardue
Toyota	TriStar Motorsports	19	Scott Lagasse Jr. 1	Paul Clapprood 9 Chuck Herman 20; Brian Wertman 4
Toyota	TriStar Motorsports	19	Mike Bliss 8	Paul Clapprood 9 Chuck Herman 20; Brian Wertman 4
Toyota	TriStar Motorsports	19	Charles Lewandoski 1	Paul Clapprood 9 Chuck Herman 20; Brian Wertman 4
Toyota	TriStar Motorsports	19	Jeff Green 23	Paul Clapprood 9 Chuck Herman 20; Brian Wertman 4
Toyota	TriStar Motorsports	44	David Starr	Greg Conner 27; Matthew Lucas 6
Toyota	Joe Gibbs Racing	18	Daniel Suárez (R)	Eric Phillips
Toyota	Joe Gibbs Racing	20	Erik Jones 15	Mike Wheeler
Toyota	Joe Gibbs Racing	20	Matt Kenseth 5	Mike Wheeler
Toyota	Joe Gibbs Racing	20	Denny Hamlin 6	Mike Wheeler
Toyota	Joe Gibbs Racing	20	Ross Kenseth 1	Mike Wheeler
Toyota	Joe Gibbs Racing	20	David Ragan 1	Mike Wheeler
Toyota	Joe Gibbs Racing	20	Kenny Wallace 1	Mike Wheeler
Toyota	Joe Gibbs Racing	20	Kenny Habul 3	Mike Wheeler
Toyota	Joe Gibbs Racing	20	Matt Tifft 1	Mike Wheeler
Toyota	Joe Gibbs Racing	54	Kyle Busch 15	Chris Gayle
Toyota	Joe Gibbs Racing	54	Erik Jones 8	Chris Gayle
Toyota	Joe Gibbs Racing	54	Denny Hamlin 5	Chris Gayle
Toyota	Joe Gibbs Racing	54	Boris Said 5	Chris Gayle
Dodge 30 Chevrolet 3	Mike Harmon Racing	74	Mike Harmon 29	Kevyn Rebolledo 1 Gary Ritter 28; Bobby Burnell 4
Dodge 30 Chevrolet 3	Mike Harmon Racing	74	Bobby Reuse 1	Kevyn Rebolledo 1 Gary Ritter 28; Bobby Burnell 4
Dodge 30 Chevrolet 3	Mike Harmon Racing	74	Jordan Anderson 1	Kevyn Rebolledo 1 Gary Ritter 28; Bobby Burnell 4
Dodge 30 Chevrolet 3	Mike Harmon Racing	74	Roger Reuse 1	Kevyn Rebolledo 1 Gary Ritter 28; Bobby Burnell 4
Dodge 30 Chevrolet 3	Mike Harmon Racing	74	Tim Viens 1	Kevyn Rebolledo 1 Gary Ritter 28; Bobby Burnell 4
Chevrolet 29 Ford 3	Rick Ware Racing 29; SS-Green Light Racing 3	15	Carlos Contreras 7	George Church 8 Greg Ely 3 Jonas Bell 2 Jason Little 1 Jeff Spraker 2 Jason Miller 8 Keith Wolfe 1 Fred Bickford 2 Dan Stillman 2 Kevyn Rebolledo 3
Chevrolet 29 Ford 3	Rick Ware Racing 29; SS-Green Light Racing 3	15	Chris Cockrum 1	George Church 8 Greg Ely 3 Jonas Bell 2 Jason Little 1 Jeff Spraker 2 Jason Miller 8 Keith Wolfe 1 Fred Bickford 2 Dan Stillman 2 Kevyn Rebolledo 3
Chevrolet 29 Ford 3	Rick Ware Racing 29; SS-Green Light Racing 3	15	Cody Ware 1	George Church 8 Greg Ely 3 Jonas Bell 2 Jason Little 1 Jeff Spraker 2 Jason Miller 8 Keith Wolfe 1 Fred Bickford 2 Dan Stillman 2 Kevyn Rebolledo 3
Chevrolet 29 Ford 3	Rick Ware Racing 29; SS-Green Light Racing 3	15	Enrique Contreras III 1	George Church 8 Greg Ely 3 Jonas Bell 2 Jason Little 1 Jeff Spraker 2 Jason Miller 8 Keith Wolfe 1 Fred Bickford 2 Dan Stillman 2 Kevyn Rebolledo 3
Chevrolet 29 Ford 3	Rick Ware Racing 29; SS-Green Light Racing 3	15	Stanton Barrett 4	George Church 8 Greg Ely 3 Jonas Bell 2 Jason Little 1 Jeff Spraker 2 Jason Miller 8 Keith Wolfe 1 Fred Bickford 2 Dan Stillman 2 Kevyn Rebolledo 3
Chevrolet 29 Ford 3	Rick Ware Racing 29; SS-Green Light Racing 3	15	B. J. McLeod 6	George Church 8 Greg Ely 3 Jonas Bell 2 Jason Little 1 Jeff Spraker 2 Jason Miller 8 Keith Wolfe 1 Fred Bickford 2 Dan Stillman 2 Kevyn Rebolledo 3
Chevrolet 29 Ford 3	Rick Ware Racing 29; SS-Green Light Racing 3	15	Jimmy Weller III 3	George Church 8 Greg Ely 3 Jonas Bell 2 Jason Little 1 Jeff Spraker 2 Jason Miller 8 Keith Wolfe 1 Fred Bickford 2 Dan Stillman 2 Kevyn Rebolledo 3
Chevrolet 29 Ford 3	Rick Ware Racing 29; SS-Green Light Racing 3	15	Todd Peck 1	George Church 8 Greg Ely 3 Jonas Bell 2 Jason Little 1 Jeff Spraker 2 Jason Miller 8 Keith Wolfe 1 Fred Bickford 2 Dan Stillman 2 Kevyn Rebolledo 3
Chevrolet 29 Ford 3	Rick Ware Racing 29; SS-Green Light Racing 3	15	Anthony Kumpen 1	George Church 8 Greg Ely 3 Jonas Bell 2 Jason Little 1 Jeff Spraker 2 Jason Miller 8 Keith Wolfe 1 Fred Bickford 2 Dan Stillman 2 Kevyn Rebolledo 3
Chevrolet 29 Ford 3	Rick Ware Racing 29; SS-Green Light Racing 3	15	Ryan Ellis 4	George Church 8 Greg Ely 3 Jonas Bell 2 Jason Little 1 Jeff Spraker 2 Jason Miller 8 Keith Wolfe 1 Fred Bickford 2 Dan Stillman 2 Kevyn Rebolledo 3
Chevrolet 29 Ford 3	Rick Ware Racing 29; SS-Green Light Racing 3	15	Kevin O'Connell 1	George Church 8 Greg Ely 3 Jonas Bell 2 Jason Little 1 Jeff Spraker 2 Jason Miller 8 Keith Wolfe 1 Fred Bickford 2 Dan Stillman 2 Kevyn Rebolledo 3
Chevrolet 29 Ford 3	Rick Ware Racing 29; SS-Green Light Racing 3	15	Ray Black Jr. 1	George Church 8 Greg Ely 3 Jonas Bell 2 Jason Little 1 Jeff Spraker 2 Jason Miller 8 Keith Wolfe 1 Fred Bickford 2 Dan Stillman 2 Kevyn Rebolledo 3
Chevrolet 29 Ford 3	Rick Ware Racing 29; SS-Green Light Racing 3	15	Korbin Forrister 1	George Church 8 Greg Ely 3 Jonas Bell 2 Jason Little 1 Jeff Spraker 2 Jason Miller 8 Keith Wolfe 1 Fred Bickford 2 Dan Stillman 2 Kevyn Rebolledo 3
Chevrolet	NTS Motorsports	15	Scott Lagasse Jr. 1	Chris Rice
Dodge 15 Toyota 10 Chevrolet 6 Ford 2	MBM Motorsports	13	Chris Cockrum 1	Jeff Spraker 1 Kevyn Rebolledo 18; Carl Long 2 Rick Markle 1 Josh Reaume 1 Sebastian Laforge 2 Robbie May 8
Dodge 15 Toyota 10 Chevrolet 6 Ford 2	MBM Motorsports	13	Cody Ware 1	Jeff Spraker 1 Kevyn Rebolledo 18; Carl Long 2 Rick Markle 1 Josh Reaume 1 Sebastian Laforge 2 Robbie May 8
Dodge 15 Toyota 10 Chevrolet 6 Ford 2	MBM Motorsports	13	Derek White 6	Jeff Spraker 1 Kevyn Rebolledo 18; Carl Long 2 Rick Markle 1 Josh Reaume 1 Sebastian Laforge 2 Robbie May 8
Dodge 15 Toyota 10 Chevrolet 6 Ford 2	MBM Motorsports	13	Carl Long 3	Jeff Spraker 1 Kevyn Rebolledo 18; Carl Long 2 Rick Markle 1 Josh Reaume 1 Sebastian Laforge 2 Robbie May 8
Dodge 15 Toyota 10 Chevrolet 6 Ford 2	MBM Motorsports	13	Timmy Hill 4	Jeff Spraker 1 Kevyn Rebolledo 18; Carl Long 2 Rick Markle 1 Josh Reaume 1 Sebastian Laforge 2 Robbie May 8
Dodge 15 Toyota 10 Chevrolet 6 Ford 2	MBM Motorsports	13	Mark Thompson 2	Jeff Spraker 1 Kevyn Rebolledo 18; Carl Long 2 Rick Markle 1 Josh Reaume 1 Sebastian Laforge 2 Robbie May 8
Dodge 15 Toyota 10 Chevrolet 6 Ford 2	MBM Motorsports	13	John Jackson 2	Jeff Spraker 1 Kevyn Rebolledo 18; Carl Long 2 Rick Markle 1 Josh Reaume 1 Sebastian Laforge 2 Robbie May 8
Dodge 15 Toyota 10 Chevrolet 6 Ford 2	MBM Motorsports	13	Josh Reaume 5	Jeff Spraker 1 Kevyn Rebolledo 18; Carl Long 2 Rick Markle 1 Josh Reaume 1 Sebastian Laforge 2 Robbie May 8
Dodge 15 Toyota 10 Chevrolet 6 Ford 2	MBM Motorsports	13	B. J. McLeod 2	Jeff Spraker 1 Kevyn Rebolledo 18; Carl Long 2 Rick Markle 1 Josh Reaume 1 Sebastian Laforge 2 Robbie May 8
Dodge 15 Toyota 10 Chevrolet 6 Ford 2	MBM Motorsports	13	Kevin O'Connell 1	Jeff Spraker 1 Kevyn Rebolledo 18; Carl Long 2 Rick Markle 1 Josh Reaume 1 Sebastian Laforge 2 Robbie May 8
Dodge 15 Toyota 10 Chevrolet 6 Ford 2	MBM Motorsports	13	Tim Cowen 2	Jeff Spraker 1 Kevyn Rebolledo 18; Carl Long 2 Rick Markle 1 Josh Reaume 1 Sebastian Laforge 2 Robbie May 8
Dodge 15 Toyota 10 Chevrolet 6 Ford 2	MBM Motorsports	13	Brad Teague 1	Jeff Spraker 1 Kevyn Rebolledo 18; Carl Long 2 Rick Markle 1 Josh Reaume 1 Sebastian Laforge 2 Robbie May 8
Dodge 15 Toyota 10 Chevrolet 6 Ford 2	MBM Motorsports	13	Harrison Rhodes 2	Jeff Spraker 1 Kevyn Rebolledo 18; Carl Long 2 Rick Markle 1 Josh Reaume 1 Sebastian Laforge 2 Robbie May 8
Dodge 15 Toyota 10 Chevrolet 6 Ford 2	MBM Motorsports	13	Rubén Pardo 1	Jeff Spraker 1 Kevyn Rebolledo 18; Carl Long 2 Rick Markle 1 Josh Reaume 1 Sebastian Laforge 2 Robbie May 8
Dodge 24 Chevrolet 4 Toyota 5	MBM Motorsports	40	Derek White 8	Kevyn Rebolledo 3 Sebastian Laforge 24; Donnie Tucker 1 John Mays 1 Josh Reaume 3
Dodge 24 Chevrolet 4 Toyota 5	MBM Motorsports	40	Carl Long 12	Kevyn Rebolledo 3 Sebastian Laforge 24; Donnie Tucker 1 John Mays 1 Josh Reaume 3
Dodge 24 Chevrolet 4 Toyota 5	MBM Motorsports	40	Timmy Hill 3	Kevyn Rebolledo 3 Sebastian Laforge 24; Donnie Tucker 1 John Mays 1 Josh Reaume 3
Dodge 24 Chevrolet 4 Toyota 5	MBM Motorsports	40	John Jackson 2	Kevyn Rebolledo 3 Sebastian Laforge 24; Donnie Tucker 1 John Mays 1 Josh Reaume 3
Dodge 24 Chevrolet 4 Toyota 5	MBM Motorsports	40	Josh Reaume (R) 7	Kevyn Rebolledo 3 Sebastian Laforge 24; Donnie Tucker 1 John Mays 1 Josh Reaume 3
Dodge 24 Chevrolet 4 Toyota 5	MBM Motorsports	40	T. J. Bell 1	Kevyn Rebolledo 3 Sebastian Laforge 24; Donnie Tucker 1 John Mays 1 Josh Reaume 3
Chevrolet	Shepherd Racing Ventures	40	Morgan Shepherd 1 (Note: Morgan Shepherd drove in the Zippo 200 at The Glen with car number 40. T. J. Bell blew the engine in Qualifying and his team didn't have a backup car for the race. Shepherd, who did not qualify for the race, took over the number 40 and was able to start with his (previously 89) own's car entered Chevrolet.)	Mike Malamphy

=== Limited schedule ===
Manufacturer	Team	No.	Race driver	Crew chief	Rounds
Chevrolet	Athenian Motorsports	25	John Wes Townley	Mike Ford 27; Michael Shelton 1	18
Chevrolet	Athenian Motorsports	25	Dylan Lupton	Mike Ford 27; Michael Shelton 1	8
Chevrolet	Athenian Motorsports	25	Alex Bowman	Mike Ford 27; Michael Shelton 1	2
Chevrolet	Billy Boat Motorsports	84	Chad Boat	Tony Manzer 2 Bruce Cook 1	3
Chevrolet	Bobby Gerhart Racing	85	Bobby Gerhart	Mark Skibo	3
Chevrolet	Deese Racing Enterprises	35	Chris Cockrum	Jeff Spraker	1
Chevrolet	Jimmy Means Racing	79	Matt Frahm	Shannon Shehan	2
Chevrolet	Jimmy Means Racing	79	Ryan Ellis	Mark Sanders	1
Chevrolet	Jimmy Means Racing	79	Zachary Bruenger	Zachary McDaniels	1
Chevrolet	Jimmy Means Racing	79	John Jackson	Richard Shehan	1
Chevrolet	JR Motorsports	5	Kasey Kahne	Ryan Pemberton	1
Chevrolet	King Autosport	92	Dexter Bean	Thomas Bear 6 Mario Gosselin 1 Bryan Berry 1 Guy Caron 1	5
Chevrolet	King Autosport	92	Mario Gosselin	Thomas Bear 6 Mario Gosselin 1 Bryan Berry 1 Guy Caron 1	3
Chevrolet	King Autosport	92	B. J. McLeod	Thomas Bear 6 Mario Gosselin 1 Bryan Berry 1 Guy Caron 1	2
Chevrolet	Chris Cockrum Racing	37	Chris Cockrum	Jeff Spraker	1
Chevrolet	Mike Affarano Motorsports	03	Johanna Long	David McClure	1
Chevrolet	NEMCO Motorsports	87	Joe Nemechek	Michael Leoncini	1
Chevrolet	Shepherd Racing Ventures	89	Morgan Shepherd	Robert Raines 2 Steve Church 1 Tony Furr 7 Claude Townsend 11; Mike Malamphy 2 Adam Johnson 3	26
Chevrolet	Team Kapusta Racing	56	Charles Lewandoski	Bryan Berry	1
Chevrolet	Team Kapusta Racing	56	Timmy Hill	Jeff Spraker	1
Chevrolet	Viva Motorsports	55	Jeffrey Earnhardt	Mark Setzer	6
Chevrolet	Viva Motorsports	55	Jamie Dick	Mark Setzer	5
Chevrolet	Viva Motorsports	55	Brandon Gdovic	Mark Setzer	2
Chevrolet	Precision Performance Motorsports	55	Brandon Gdovic	Mark Setzer	1
Chevrolet	Precision Performance Motorsports	55	Anthony Kumpen	Mark Setzer	2
Ford	Biagi-DenBeste Racing	98	Aric Almirola	Jon Hanson	9
Ford	Biagi-DenBeste Racing	98	Sam Hornish Jr.	Jon Hanson	3
Ford	Biagi-DenBeste Racing	98	Ryan Truex	Jon Hanson	4
Ford	Team Penske	12	Joey Logano	Todd Gordon	1
Toyota	Hattori Racing Enterprises	80	Ross Kenseth	Pat Tryson	1
Toyota	JGL Racing	26	Mike Wallace	Ken Evans 25; Steve Lane 1	1
Toyota	JGL Racing	26	Kenny Wallace	Ken Evans 25; Steve Lane 1	1
Toyota	JGL Racing	26	Ryan Ellis	Ken Evans 25; Steve Lane 1	1
Toyota	JGL Racing	26	Kyle Fowler	Ken Evans 25; Steve Lane 1	1
Toyota	JGL Racing	26	C. J. Faison	Ken Evans 25; Steve Lane 1	2
Toyota	JGL Racing	26	T. J. Bell	Ken Evans 25; Steve Lane 1	10
Toyota	JGL Racing	26	Timmy Hill	Ken Evans 25; Steve Lane 1	3
Toyota	JGL Racing	26	Matt Wallace	Ken Evans 25; Steve Lane 1	2
Toyota	JGL Racing	26	Tomy Drissi	Ken Evans 25; Steve Lane 1	3
Toyota	JGL Racing	26	Hermie Sadler	Ken Evans 25; Steve Lane 1	2
Toyota	PEG Racing	66	Benny Gordon	Howard Bixman	4
Toyota	RAB Racing	29	Justin Marks	Matthew Lucas	1
Toyota	RAB Racing	29	Kenny Wallace	Keith Hinkein	1
Toyota	Vision Racing	17	Tanner Berryhill	Adrian Berryhill	1
Toyota	Vision Racing	17	Benny Gordon	Howard Bixman	1
Ford 2 Chevrolet 2	Rick Ware Racing	17	Stanton Barrett	Jason Little 1 Kevin Rebolledo 2 George Church 1	1
Ford 2 Chevrolet 2	Rick Ware Racing	17	Ryan Ellis	Jason Little 1 Kevin Rebolledo 2 George Church 1	2
Ford 2 Chevrolet 2	Rick Ware Racing	17	Timmy Hill	Jason Little 1 Kevin Rebolledo 2 George Church 1	1
Toyota 9 Chevrolet 1	TriStar Motorsports	10	Scott Lagasse Jr.	Chase Miller 2 Jason Benz 6	1
Toyota 9 Chevrolet 1	TriStar Motorsports	10	Jeff Green	Chase Miller 2 Jason Benz 6	6
Toyota 9 Chevrolet 1	TriStar Motorsports	10	Charles Lewandoski	Chase Miller 2 Jason Benz 6	1
Toyota 9 Chevrolet 1	Jennifer Jo Cobb Racing	10	Jennifer Jo Cobb	Steve Kuykendall	1

=== Driver and team changes ===
- Kevin Harvick, Kasey Kahne, and 2014 K&N Pro Series East champion Ben Rhodes moved to the No. 88 with Dale Earnhardt Jr. for JR Motorsports. Kahne also drove a single race in the No. 5.
- Austin Dillon ran the majority of the Xfinity races for RCR in the No. 33. Brandon Jones ran part-time.
- With Turner Scott Motorsports disbanding, Kyle Larson and ARCA Racing Series driver Brennan Poole shared the No. 42 Camaro under the Chip Ganassi Racing banner, while Dylan Kwasniewski left the team.
- Daniel Suárez began running a full schedule in 2015 for Joe Gibbs Racing in the No. 18 Toyota Camry.
- Elliott Sadler ran the full 2015 schedule with Roush Fenway Racing in the No. 1 Ford Mustang.
- Bubba Wallace moved up from the Camping World Truck Series to run the full 2015 schedule with Roush Fenway Racing in No. 6 Ford Mustang, replacing Trevor Bayne.
- Athenian Motorsports's Xfinity program switched to Chevrolet and moved up full-time, with John Wes Townley running at least 18 races. Dylan Lupton, runner up in the 2014 NASCAR K&N Pro Series West, drove the No. 25 Chevrolet in 7 races.
- Eric McClure departed TriStar Motorsports for a full-time seat with JGL Racing. McClure used the number 24, which he previously used with Front Row Motorsports and Team Rensi Motorsports, while the team switched to Toyota. McClure would return to TriStar after 9 races with JGL, bringing the No. 24 with him, at which time Mike Bliss departed the team; McClure inherited his owner points (JGL retained the owner points McClure scored in the first nine races and reassigned them to the No. 26) while the No. 19 was reassigned to the start-and-park team and Jeff Green.
- Cale Conley ran the full season for TriStar Motorsports after running part-time with Richard Childress Racing in 2014. Conley replaced McClure in the No. 14 Camry. However, Conley failed to complete the season after sponsorship dried up.
- Blake Koch started running full-time for TriStar in the No. 8 Camry after running the team's 10, 44, and 91 cars in 2014.
- David Starr ran full-time for TriStar Motorsports in the No. 44 Toyota after running 13 races for the team in 2014.
- Ross Chastain started racing full-time JD Motorsports in the No. 4 Chevrolet, replacing Jeffrey Earnhardt. Earnhardt would move to Viva Motorsports, splitting the ride with Jamie Dick.
- Harrison Rhodes competed for Rookie of the Year honors with JD Motorsports, driving the No. 0 Chevrolet.

== Schedule ==
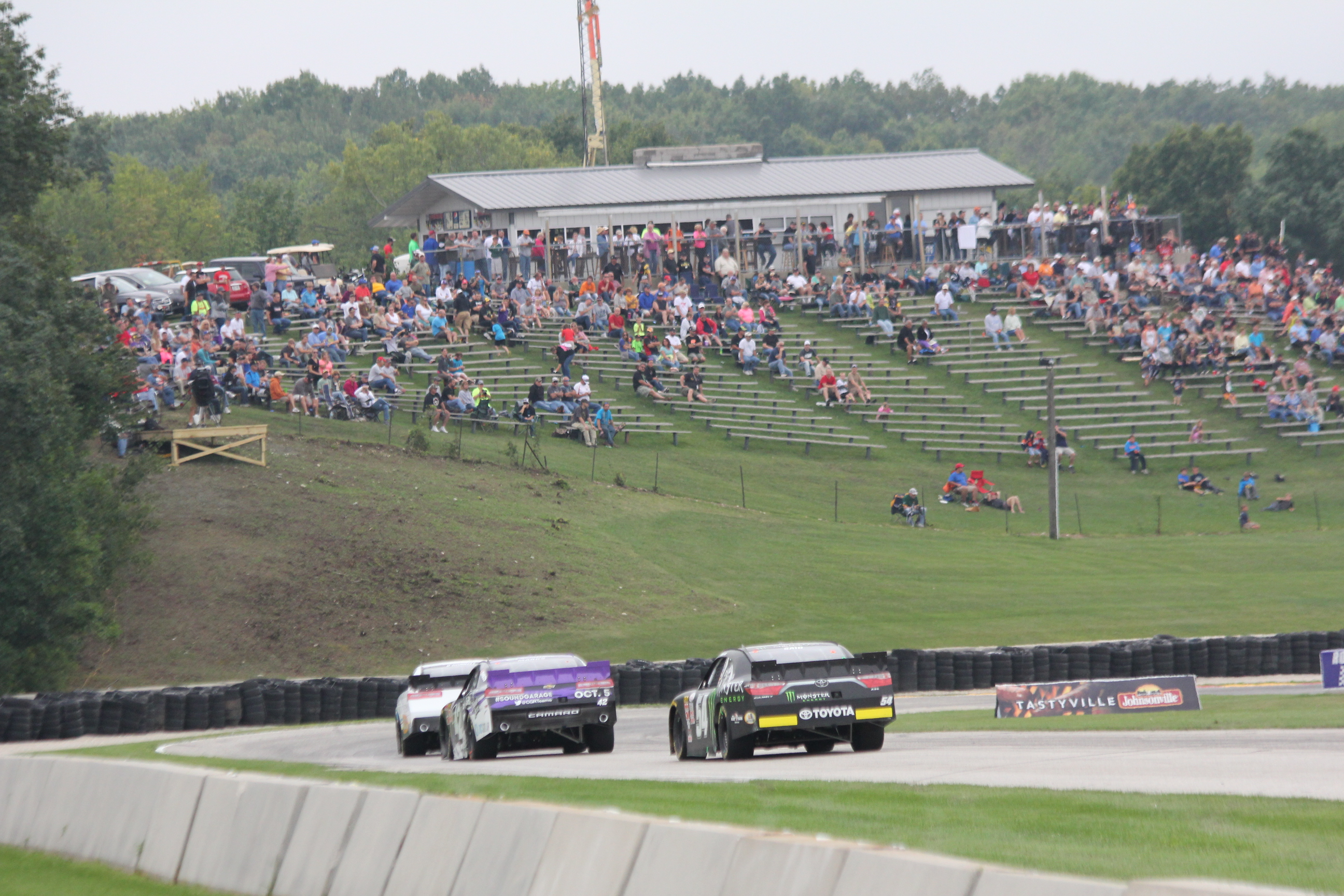
The Road America 180 at Road America in August

The 2015 schedule was announced on August 26, 2014.

No.	Race title	Track	location	Date
1	Alert Today Florida 300	Daytona International Speedway	Daytona Beach, Florida	February 21
2	Hisense 250	Atlanta Motor Speedway	Hampton, Georgia	February 28
3	Boyd Gaming 300	Las Vegas Motor Speedway	Las Vegas, Nevada	March 7
4	Axalta Faster. Tougher. Brighter. 200	Phoenix International Raceway	Avondale, Arizona	March 14
5	Drive4Clots.com 300	Auto Club Speedway	Fontana, California	March 21
6	O'Reilly Auto Parts 300	Texas Motor Speedway	Fort Worth, Texas	April 10
7	Drive to Stop Diabetes 300	Bristol Motor Speedway	Bristol, Tennessee	April 18
8	ToyotaCare 250	Richmond International Raceway	Richmond, Virginia	April 24
9	Winn-Dixie 300	Talladega Superspeedway	Lincoln, Alabama	May 2
10	3M 250	Iowa Speedway	Newton, Iowa	May 17
11	Hisense 300	Charlotte Motor Speedway	Concord, North Carolina	May 23
12	Buckle Up 200	Dover International Speedway	Dover, Delaware	May 30
13	Great Clips 250	Michigan International Speedway	Cambridge Township, Michigan	June 13
14	Owens Corning AttiCat 300	Chicagoland Speedway	Joliet, Illinois	June 21†
15	Subway Firecracker 250	Daytona International Speedway	Daytona Beach, Florida	July 4
16	Kentucky 300	Kentucky Speedway	Sparta, Kentucky	July 10
17	Lakes Region 200	New Hampshire Motor Speedway	Loudon, New Hampshire	July 18
18	Lilly Diabetes 250	Indianapolis Motor Speedway	Speedway, Indiana	July 25
19	U.S. Cellular 250	Iowa Speedway, Newton	Newton, Iowa	August 1
20	Zippo 200 at The Glen	Watkins Glen International	Watkins Glen, New York	August 8
21	Nationwide Children's Hospital 200	Mid-Ohio Sports Car Course, Lexington	Lexington, Ohio	August 15
22	Food City 300	Bristol Motor Speedway	Bristol, Tennessee	August 21
23	Road America 180 fired up by Johnsonville	Road America	Elkhart Lake, Wisconsin	August 29
24	VFW Sport Clips Help a Hero 200	Darlington Raceway, Darlington	Darlington, South Carolina	September 5
25	Virginia 529 College Savings 250	Richmond International Raceway	Richmond, Virginia	September 11
26	Furious 7 300	Chicagoland Speedway	Joliet, Illinois	September 19
27	VisitMyrtleBeach.com 300	Kentucky Speedway	Sparta, Kentucky	September 26
28	Hisense 200	Dover International Speedway, Dover	Dover, Delaware	October 3
29	Drive for the Cure 300	Charlotte Motor Speedway, Concord	Concord, North Carolina	October 9
30	Kansas Lottery 300	Kansas Speedway, Kansas City	Kansas City, Kansas	October 17
31	O'Reilly Auto Parts Challenge	Texas Motor Speedway, Fort Worth	Fort Worth, Texas	November 7
32	DAV 200 Presented by Great Clips	Phoenix International Raceway, Avondale	Avondale, Arizona	November 14
33	Ford EcoBoost 300	Homestead–Miami Speedway	Homestead, Florida	November 21
†: The Owens Corning AttiCat 300 was postponed a day because of persistent rain.

== Results and standings ==
=== Races ===
No.	Race	Pole position	Most Laps Led	Winning driver	Manufacturer	No.	Winning team
1	Alert Today Florida 300	Austin Dillon	Kyle Busch	Ryan Reed	Ford	16	Roush Fenway Racing
2	Hisense 250	Joey Logano	Kevin Harvick	Kevin Harvick	Chevrolet	88	JR Motorsports
3	Boyd Gaming 300	Austin Dillon	Austin Dillon	Austin Dillon	Chevrolet	33	Richard Childress Racing
4	Axalta Faster. Tougher. Brighter. 200	Joey Logano	Joey Logano	Joey Logano	Ford	22	Team Penske
5	Drive4Clots.com 300	Erik Jones	Kevin Harvick	Kevin Harvick	Chevrolet	88	JR Motorsports
6	O'Reilly Auto Parts 300	Erik Jones	Erik Jones	Erik Jones	Toyota	20	Joe Gibbs Racing
7	Drive to Stop Diabetes 300	Erik Jones	Joey Logano	Joey Logano	Ford	22	Team Penske
8	ToyotaCare 250	Denny Hamlin	Denny Hamlin	Denny Hamlin	Toyota	20	Joe Gibbs Racing
9	Winn-Dixie 300	Austin Dillon	Joey Logano	Joey Logano	Ford	22	Team Penske
10	3M 250	Drew Herring	Chase Elliott	Chris Buescher	Ford	60	Roush Fenway Racing
11	Hisense 300	Austin Dillon	Austin Dillon	Austin Dillon	Chevrolet	33	Richard Childress Racing
12	Buckle Up 200	Bubba Wallace	Erik Jones	Chris Buescher	Ford	60	Roush Fenway Racing
13	Great Clips 250	Joey Logano	Joey Logano	Kyle Busch	Toyota	54	Joe Gibbs Racing
14	Owens Corning AttiCat 300	Austin Dillon	Erik Jones	Erik Jones	Toyota	20	Joe Gibbs Racing
15	Subway Firecracker 250	Daniel Suárez	Brian Scott	Austin Dillon	Chevrolet	33	Richard Childress Racing
16	Kentucky 300	J. J. Yeley	Kyle Busch	Brad Keselowski	Ford	22	Team Penske
17	Lakes Region 200	Denny Hamlin	Denny Hamlin	Denny Hamlin	Toyota	20	Joe Gibbs Racing
18	Lilly Diabetes 250	Kyle Busch	Kyle Busch	Kyle Busch	Toyota	54	Joe Gibbs Racing
19	U.S. Cellular 250	Daniel Suárez	Ryan Blaney	Ryan Blaney	Ford	22	Team Penske
20	Zippo 200 at The Glen	Joey Logano	Brad Keselowski	Joey Logano	Ford	12	Team Penske
21	Nationwide Children's Hospital 200	Alex Tagliani	Alex Tagliani	Regan Smith	Chevrolet	7	JR Motorsports
22	Food City 300	Denny Hamlin	Denny Hamlin/Chris Buescher	Kyle Busch	Toyota	54	Joe Gibbs Racing
23	Road America 180	Ben Rhodes	Chase Elliott	Paul Menard	Chevrolet	33	Richard Childress Racing
24	VFW Sport Clips Help a Hero 200	Denny Hamlin	Denny Hamlin	Denny Hamlin	Toyota	20	Joe Gibbs Racing
25	Virginia 529 College Savings 250	Kyle Busch	Chase Elliott	Chase Elliott	Chevrolet	9	JR Motorsports
26	Furious 7 300	Kyle Busch	Kyle Busch	Kyle Busch	Toyota	54	Joe Gibbs Racing
27	VisitMyrtleBeach.com 300	Daniel Suárez	Ryan Blaney	Ryan Blaney	Ford	22	Team Penske
28	Hisense 200	Ryan Blaney	Kyle Busch	Regan Smith	Chevrolet	7	JR Motorsports
29	Drive for the Cure 300	Austin Dillon	Kyle Busch	Austin Dillon	Chevrolet	33	Richard Childress Racing
30	Kansas Lottery 300	Matt Kenseth	Matt Kenseth	Kyle Busch	Toyota	54	Joe Gibbs Racing
31	O'Reilly Auto Parts Challenge	Austin Dillon	Brad Keselowski	Brad Keselowski	Ford	22	Team Penske
32	DAV 200	Kyle Busch	Kyle Busch	Kyle Busch	Toyota	54	Joe Gibbs Racing
33	Ford EcoBoost 300	Kyle Busch	Kyle Larson	Kyle Larson	Chevrolet	42	HScott Motorsports with Chip Ganassi

=== Drivers' championship ===
(key) Bold - Pole position awarded by time. Italics - Pole position set by final practice results or rainout. * – Most laps led. ^{1} – Post entry, driver and owner did not score points.

Pos.	Driver	Races																																	Points
Pos.	Driver	DAY	ATL	LVS	PHO	CAL	TEX	BRI	RCH	TAL	IOW	CLT	DOV	MCH	CHI	DAY	KEN	NHA	IND	IOW	GLN	MOH	BRI	ROA	DAR	RCH	CHI	KEN	DOV	CLT	KAN	TEX	PHO	HOM	Points
1	Chris Buescher	2	4	14	14	5	9	3	20	6	1	11	1	4	5	12	11	14	16	13	3	4	11*	9	5	10	7	7	8	7	6	11	13	11	1190
2	Chase Elliott	28	5	5	7	4	8	6	5	37	2*	8	6	2	14	3	13	9	10	9	7	5	7	4*	24	1*	14	4	7	9	7	8	7	8	1175
3	Ty Dillon	3	3	8	6	14	12	5	9	8	14	7	8	13	9	26	15	6	9	4	5	3	4	10	15	8	5	2	28	6	4	5	5	7	1172
4	Regan Smith	35	9	3	9	9	4	30	3	9	11	4	3	11	13	17	10	7	8	2	20	1	9	8	9	6	9	3	1	5	5	9	6	9	1168
5	Daniel Suárez **(R)**	39	14	10	11	13	18	2	6	31	18	6	19	20	7	**15**	4	5	3	**6**	15	11	5	24	3	12	6	**23**	10	4	9	6	4	6	1078
6	Elliott Sadler	19	18	13	12	10	11	10	16	7	9	9	21	5	11	2	5	17	5	8	8	6	31	12	11	24	8	11	9	10	12	10	9	13	1075
7	Bubba Wallace **(R)**	12	11	7	15	12	6	12	12	20	6	5	**17**	15	10	34	7	8	23	11	16	8	12	5	14	14	3	9	11	8	11	19	8	10	1071
8	Brian Scott	25	7	38	10	6	10	8	7	2	4	20	36	9	8	23*	19	29	11	3	6	7	6	3	12	3	17	13	31	13	23	7	11	4	1032
9	Brendan Gaughan	29	12	6	8	2	33	9	11	39	10	18	7	12	4	25	9	11	13	5	10	12	10	16	13	16	10	6	16	15	10	12	12	23	1012
10	Ryan Reed	1	16	15	13	11	15	21	21	32	12	12	11	19	12	13	14	13	20	19	30	22	25	19	23	13	11	25	14	11	17	15	23	17	902
11	Ryan Sieg	38	23	21	17	20	20	17	31	29	17	24	20	17	15	27	23	34	12	12	14	14	16	22	17	17	18	12	17	14	8	13	16	14	827
12	J. J. Yeley	27	19	16	24	22	19	33	19	4	34	21	18	25	16	20	18	15	18	18	12	16	19	35	16	20	19	15	12	19	21	23	17	21	803
13	Dakoda Armstrong	11	20	30	18	36	16	23	27	22	21	16	14	16	28	6	17	16	19	16	23	23	24	34	18	21	15	14	20	16	20	18	18	15	803
14	Jeremy Clements	14	21	22	16	24	22	13	14	17	15	13	10	31	19	28	26	19	15	21	11	17	14	28	20	34	20	19	21	20	19	17	30	22	801
15	Ross Chastain **(R)**	9	24	18	27	17	21	27	17	25	32	31	16	21	18	10	20	37	22	10	17	19	17	27	10	15	16	18	37	24	14	16	19	19	785
16	David Starr	6	26	17	21	15	23	18	29	14	16	22	13	33	24	29	21	22	36	22	26	31	20	20	22	37	23	20	18	25	22	25	21	25	713
17	Blake Koch	20	22	35	25	19	32	22	24	23	22	23	30	36	22	18	22	20	37	24	18	24	21	21	27	19	21	40	23	33	25	21	20	18	646
18	Landon Cassill	31	17	20	37	21	25	28	10	11	20	17	22	35		31	16	23	31		36	18	15		8	18	32		15	18	18	22	29	16	637
19	Eric McClure	17	28	23	29	34	29	26	36	21	33	30	24	23	26	24	27	18	29	26	24	35	33	23	28	26	27	29	22	28	26	28	26	29	565
20	Cale Conley **(R)**	30	35	25	22	16	34	19	25	24	19	34	33	26	20	32	29	21	21	23	21	20	18	37	19	22	33	16	29	26	30				561
21	Joey Gase	32	30	27	31	30	31	25	26	5	27	32	29	27	31	30	25	28	26	34	31	26	27	29	30	27	28	21	24	27	28	26	25	32	545
22	Ryan Blaney			2							5	10	34		2				2	1*			22	2			35	1*	4					5	461
23	Brennan Poole			9	26		13	11	13	28	38		12		17	36	12	10		14						11		32		21	13				433
24	Harrison Rhodes **(R)**	DNQ	34	26	23	25	27	29	22	36	37	35	26	22	25	9	35	39	25	35			34		33	23		34	27	34	27	34	22	24	430
25	Mike Harmon	24	37	31	35	35	40	35	39	DNQ	30	DNQ	35	32	32	33	30	31	33	29		33			34	29	34	27	25	29	38	32	31		315
26	Derrike Cope	DNQ	36	33	33	31	36	37	35	DNQ	29	DNQ	28	37	35	38	33	32	30		27	25	30	30	32		31	24	32	32	39	30			309
27	Peyton Sellers **(R)**				36	29	30	32	32	18	28	28	25	24	27	16	31	26	35		34														238
28	Ben Rhodes										7				21			12		30	35	10		32				30	13					20	230
29	Mario Gosselin	15		32	38	27	28			19			32										35					DNQ	19		Wth	39	28	34	182
30	Dylan Lupton				19				28						34			24		17		9		13				31							178
31	Mike Bliss		25	39	20	26	24	20	23	34																						36	35	37	166
32	Boris Said									16	26										4	13		6											157
33	Josh Reaume **(R)**	23	38	DNQ										29	33		37	38	39	39		39				28	30		34	38		37		31	147
34	Morgan Shepherd	Wth	40	37	DNQ			38	DNQ		Wth		39		37	39	38	36	38	37	38	37^{1}	38	39	35	DNQ	DNQ	33	33	37	35	35	DNQ	DNQ	134
35	Jeffrey Earnhardt	16	32			28		15		12				34																					128
36	Derek White	22		28	39	33	39	40		26						DNQ	36	27						38			37					31		35	126
37	Martin Roy													28	30	21			24								29	22				29			125
38	Jeff Green	QL		40	40	40	38	39	40	QL		40	40	39	40	DNQ	40	40	40	40	40	40	40	40	38	40	40	39	40	40	40	40	40	40	119
39	Jimmy Weller III		33						33			26		30	29					33						39	26			30					117
40	Michael Self																			32	37	27		11			25	36			32				108
41	Carl Long		39	36	32	39			37		40	36	38	38									39		39	36		26	39				39		107
42	Dylan Kwasniewski																					34	32	33		25		17					34		89
43	Ryan Truex																									31		28		17		20			80
44	Todd Bodine							24			24										19				29										80
45	Justin Marks	34																				15		7											76
46	Jamie Dick			24	28						25	38	37																						68
47	Stanton Barrett					32	37												28					26					30						67
48	Brandon Gdovic						26		30												13														63
49	Kenny Habul																				29	28		14											61
50	Benny Gordon									13^{1}						5							37			38	36								60
51	Kenny Wallace									38	23									15															56
52	Anthony Kumpen																			28													24	27	53
53	Andy Lally																					21		15											52
54	Ross Kenseth														6																		33		50
55	Alex Tagliani																					**2***													44
56	Carlos Contreras	DNQ						36	34	DNQ												36			37									36	41
57	Tomy Drissi																				25	32		36											39
58	Kevin O'Connell																				33			17											38
59	Chris Cockrum	21	29							DNQ						DNQ																			38
60	Josh Berry																									7									37
61	Tim Cowen																					30		25											33
62	John Jackson										31				38					36		38^{1}						38							33
63	Bobby Gerhart	DNQ								DNQ					36	22																			30
64	Matt Wallace																	33		25															30
65	Hermie Sadler																						29			32									27
66	Lawson Aschenbach																							18											26
67	C. J. Faison												23	40																					25
68	Parker Kligerman																								21										23
69	Charles Lewandoski				30					40	39																								23
70	Dexter Bean	40		DNQ												40											39		38						19
71	Brad Teague																						26												18
72	Mark Thompson									27						DNQ																			17
73	Johanna Long								DNQ											27															17
74	Scott Lagasse Jr.	37														37																			14
75	Matt Frahm														39^{1}			35^{1}		31															13
76	Roger Reuse																							31											13
77	Bobby Reuse																				32														12
78	Matt Waltz																									33							DNQ		11
79	Enrique Contreras III				34																														10
	Zachary Bruenger																			38^{1}															0
	Drew Herring										**QL**									QL								QL							0
Ineligible for Xfinity Series driver points
Pos.	Driver	DAY	ATL	LVS	PHO	CAL	TEX	BRI	RCH	TAL	IOW	CLT	DOV	MCH	CHI	DAY	KEN	NHA	IND	IOW	GLN	MOH	BRI	ROA	DAR	RCH	CHI	KEN	DOV	CLT	KAN	TEX	PHO	HOM	Points
	Kyle Busch	26*												1			3*	4	**1***				1		2	**2**	**1***		3*	31*	1	14	**1***	**30**	
	Austin Dillon	**4**		**1***	4	38	5	16	8	**3**		**1***	4		**3**	1		2								9			6	**1**	16	3	14	2	
	Joey Logano		**2**		**1***			1*	2	1*				**7***		14					**1**				6	4					3				
	Denny Hamlin			4		18	7	31	**1***			2		10				**1***					**3***		**1***				2						
	Brad Keselowski	5				8	2										1	3			2									3		1*	2		
	Erik Jones	18	13	29	5	**3**	**1***	**4**	4	30	3	15	9*		1*	8	2		34	7						5		8		2		4	3	3	
	Kevin Harvick		1*		3	1*		7	18			14		6					6				8		4						15	2			
	Kyle Larson	8	10			7						33		3					7		28		2		7		22		5			33	15	1*	
	Paul Menard		6											18			6		4		9			1	25		4								
	Matt Kenseth		8		2								2														2				**2***				
	Kasey Kahne									33		3	5			4											12			12			10		
	Dale Earnhardt Jr.	10		12			3										8																		
	Brandon Jones										8									20		29	13					5							
	Aric Almirola	7		11					15	10		19	Wth	8		35			14															12	
	David Ragan															7																			
	Matt Tifft																											10							
	Timmy Hill						35	33	38			39	31			11	24		27										35	39	37		27		
	John Wes Townley	33	27	19		23	17	14		15	13	29	15			19	32				39		23		26	30	13		Wth	22					
	Mike Wallace	13																																	
	Sam Hornish Jr.		15			37	14																												
	Alex Bowman													14					17																
	Ryan Ellis										35						39				22	QL	28		40	35	Wth	37	26	23	34				
	T. J. Bell														23						QL				36		38	35	36	36	36	38	36	39	
	Mason Mingus																										24				24	24		26	
	B. J. McLeod										36	37	27				34	25	32						31					35	33		37	38	
	Chad Boat	36								35		25																							
	Kyle Fowler											27																							
	Ray Black Jr.																															27			
	Tyler Young																28																		
	Garrett Smithley																																	28	
	Jennifer Jo Cobb																														29				
	Todd Peck																	30																	
	Korbin Forrister																														31		32		
	Cody Ware		31	34																															
	Tim Viens																																	33^{2}	
	Jordan Anderson																						36												
	Rubén Pardo																																38		
	Joe Nemechek	DNQ																																	
	Tanner Berryhill	DNQ																																	
Pos.	Driver	DAY	ATL	LVS	PHO	CAL	TEX	BRI	RCH	TAL	IOW	CLT	DOV	MCH	CHI	DAY	KEN	NHA	IND	IOW	GLN	MOH	BRI	ROA	DAR	RCH	CHI	KEN	DOV	CLT	KAN	TEX	PHO	HOM	Points
Pos.	Driver	Races																																	Points
^{1} Post entry, driver and owner did not score points.
^{2} Tim Viens did not complete all 200 laps; during a caution, he was replaced by owner Mike Harmon. Since Viens started the race, he is officially credited with the 33rd-place finish.

=== Owners' championship (Top 15) ===
(key) Bold - Pole position awarded by time. Italics - Pole position set by final practice results or rainout. * – Most laps led.

Pos.	No.	Car Owner	Driver	Races																																	Points
Pos.	No.	Car Owner	Driver	DAY	ATL	LVS	PHO	CAL	TEX	BRI	RCH	TAL	IOW	CLT	DOV	MCH	CHI	DAY	KEN	NHA	IND	IOW	GLN	MOH	BRI	ROA	DAR	RCH	CHI	KEN	DOV	CLT	KAN	TEX	PHO	HOM	Points
1	22	Roger Penske	Brad Keselowski	5				8	2										1	3			2									3		1*	2		1308
1	22	Roger Penske	Joey Logano		**2**		**1***			1*	2	1*				**7***		14									6	4					3				1308
1	22	Roger Penske	Ryan Blaney			2							5	10	34		2				2	1*			22	2			35	1*	4					5	1308
1	22	Roger Penske	Alex Tagliani																					**2***													1308
2	54	J. D. Gibbs	Kyle Busch	26*												1			3*	4	**1***				1		2	**2**	**1***		3*	31*	1	14	**1***	**31**	1191
2	54	J. D. Gibbs	Erik Jones		13		5				4				9*		1*	8				7								8							1191
2	54	J. D. Gibbs	Denny Hamlin			4		18	7	31				2																							1191
2	54	J. D. Gibbs	Boris Said									16	26										4	13		6											1191
3	60	Jack Roush	Chris Buescher	2	4	14	14	5	9	3	20	6	1	11	1	4	5	12	11	14	16	13	3	4	11*	9	5	10	7	7	8	7	6	11	13	11	1190
4	33	Richard Childress	Austin Dillon	**4**		**1***	4	38	5	16	8	**3**		**1***	4		**3**	1		2								9			6	**1**	16	3	14	2	1187
4	33	Richard Childress	Paul Menard		6											18			6		4		9			1	25		4								1187
4	33	Richard Childress	Brandon Jones										8									20		29	13					5							1187
5	20	Joe Gibbs	Erik Jones	18		29		**3**	**1***	**4**		30	3	15							34							5				2		4	3	3	1186
5	20	Joe Gibbs	Matt Kenseth		8		2								2														2				**2***				1186
5	20	Joe Gibbs	Denny Hamlin								**1***					10				**1***					**3***		**1***				2						1186
5	20	Joe Gibbs	Ross Kenseth														6																				1186
5	20	Joe Gibbs	David Ragan															7																			1186
5	20	Joe Gibbs	Kenny Wallace																			15															1186
5	20	Joe Gibbs	Kenny Habul																				29	28		14											1186
5	20	Joe Gibbs	Matt Tifft																											10							1186
6	9	Dale Earnhardt Jr.	Chase Elliott	28	5	5	7	4	8	6	5	37	2*	8	6	2	14	3	13	9	10	9	7	5	7	4*	24	1*	14	4	7	9	7	8	7	8	1175
7	3	Richard Childress	Ty Dillon	3	3	8	6	14	12	5	9	8	14	7	8	13	9	26	15	6	9	4	5	3	4	10	15	8	5	2	28	6	4	5	5	7	1172
8	7	Kelley Earnhardt Miller	Regan Smith	35	9	3	9	9	4	30	3	9	11	4	3	11	13	17	10	7	8	2	20	1	9	8	9	6	9	3	1	5	5	9	6	9	1168
9	18	Joe Gibbs	Daniel Suárez	39	14	10	11	13	18	2	6	31	18	6	19	20	7	**15**	4	5	3	**6**	15	11	5	24	3	12	6	**23**	10	4	9	6	4	6	1078
10	1	Jack Roush	Elliott Sadler	19	18	13	12	10	11	10	16	7	9	9	21	5	11	2	5	17	5	8	8	6	31	12	11	24	8	11	9	10	12	10	9	13	1075
11	6	Jack Roush	Bubba Wallace	12	11	7	15	12	6	12	12	20	6	5	**17**	15	10	34	7	8	23	11	16	8	12	5	14	14	3	9	11	8	11	19	8	10	1075
12	88	Rick Hendrick	Dale Earnhardt Jr.	10		12			3										8																		1057
12	88	Rick Hendrick	Kevin Harvick		1*		3	1*		7	18			14		6					6				8		4						15	2			1057
12	88	Rick Hendrick	Kasey Kahne									33			5			4											12			12			10		1057
12	88	Rick Hendrick	Ben Rhodes										7				21			12		30	35	10		32				30	13					20	1057
12	88	Rick Hendrick	Josh Berry																									7									1057
13	2	Richard Childress	Brian Scott	25	7	38	10	6	10	8	7	2	4	20	36	9	8	23*	19	29	11	3	6	7	6	3	12	3	17	13	31	13	23	7	11	4	1032
14	62	Richard Childress	Brendan Gaughan	29	12	6	8	2	33	9	11	39	10	18	7	12	4	25	9	11	13	5	10	12	10	16	13	16	10	6	16	15	10	12	12	23	1012
15	42	Harry Scott Jr.	Kyle Larson	8	10			7						33		3					7		28		2		7		22		5			33	15	1*	942
15	42	Harry Scott Jr.	Brennan Poole			9	26		13	11	13	28	38		12		17	36	12	10		14						11		32		21	13				942
15	42	Harry Scott Jr.	Justin Marks																					15		7											942
Pos.	No.	Car Owner	Driver	DAY	ATL	LVS	PHO	CAL	TEX	BRI	RCH	TAL	IOW	CLT	DOV	MCH	CHI	DAY	KEN	NHA	IND	IOW	GLN	MOH	BRI	ROA	DAR	RCH	CHI	KEN	DOV	CLT	KAN	TEX	PHO	HOM	Points
Pos.	No.	Car Owner	Driver	Races																																	Points

=== Manufacturers' championship ===
Pos	Manufacturer	Wins	Points
1	Chevrolet	11	1434
2	Ford	11	1430
3	Toyota	11	1413
4	Dodge	0	409

== See also ==
- 2015 NASCAR Sprint Cup Series
- 2015 NASCAR Camping World Truck Series
- 2015 ARCA Racing Series
- 2015 NASCAR K&N Pro Series East
- 2015 NASCAR K&N Pro Series West
- 2015 NASCAR Whelen Modified Tour
- 2015 NASCAR Whelen Southern Modified Tour
- 2015 NASCAR Canadian Tire Series
- 2015 NASCAR Mexico Series
- 2015 NASCAR Whelen Euro Series
