= 2015 Drive4Clots.com 300 =

5th race in the 2015 NASCAR Xfinity Series

Race details
- Race 5 of 33 of the 2015 NASCAR Xfinity Series
- Date: March 21, 2015
- Location: Auto Club Speedway, Fontana, California
- Course: Permanent racing facility
- Course length: 2 miles (3.2 km)
- Distance: 150 laps, 300 mi (482.803 km)
- Average speed: 147.723 miles per hour (237.737 km/h)

Pole position
Driver	Erik Jones	Joe Gibbs Racing
- Time: 40.384

Most laps led
Driver	Kevin Harvick	JR Motorsports
- Laps: 100

Winner
No. 88	Kevin Harvick	JR Motorsports

Television in the United States
- Network: FS1
- Announcers: Adam Alexander, Clint Bowyer, and Michael Waltrip

Radio in the United States
- Radio: MRN

The 2015 Drive4Clots.com 300 was the 5th race of the 2015 NASCAR Xfinity Series season and 19th iteration of the event. The race was held at Auto Club Speedway a 2 miles (3.2 km) permanent asphalt D-shaped oval track in Fontana, California on Saturday, March 21, 2015. Kevin Harvick won the race while Brendan Gaughan and Erik Jones finished 2nd and 3rd, respectively.

== Background ==
The layout of Auto Club Speedway, the venue where the race was held.

Auto Club Speedway (also known as California Speedway) was a 2 miles (3.2 km), low-banked, D-shaped oval superspeedway in Fontana, California. The track was owned and operated by International Speedway Corporation.

=== Entry list ===
- (R) denotes a rookie driver
- (I) Ineligible for points

No	Driver	Team	Manufacturer
0	Harrison Rhodes (R)	JD Motorsports	Chevrolet
01	Landon Cassill	JD Motorsports	Chevrolet
1	Elliott Sadler	Roush Fenway Racing	Ford
2	Brian Scott	Richard Childress Racing	Chevrolet
3	Ty Dillon	Richard Childress Racing	Chevrolet
4	Ross Chastain (R)	JD Motorsports	Chevrolet
6	Bubba Wallace (R)	Roush Fenway Racing	Ford
7	Regan Smith	JR Motorsports	Chevrolet
8	Blake Koch	TriStar Motorsports	Toyota
9	Chase Elliott	JR Motorsports	Chevrolet
10	Jeff Green	TriStar Motorsports	Toyota
13	Derek White	MBM Motorsports	Toyota
14	Cale Conley (R)	TriStar Motorsports	Toyota
15	Stanton Barrett	Rick Ware Racing	Chevrolet
16	Ryan Reed	Roush Fenway Racing	Ford
18	Daniel Suárez (R)	Joe Gibbs Racing	Toyota
19	Mike Bliss	TriStar Motorsports	Toyota
20	Erik Jones (I)	Joe Gibbs Racing	Toyota
22	Brad Keselowski (I)	Team Penske	Ford
24	Eric McClure	JGL Racing	Toyota
25	John Wes Townley (I)	Athenian Motorsports	Chevrolet
28	J. J. Yeley	JGL Racing	Toyota
33	Austin Dillon (I)	Richard Childress Racing	Chevrolet
39	Ryan Sieg	RSS Racing	Chevrolet
40	Carl Long	MBM Motorsports	Dodge
42	Kyle Larson (I)	HScott Motorsports	Chevrolet
43	Dakoda Armstrong	Richard Petty Motorsports	Ford
44	David Starr	TriStar Motorsports	Toyota
51	Jeremy Clements	Jeremy Clements Racing	Chevrolet
52	Joey Gase	Jimmy Means Racing	Chevrolet
54	Denny Hamlin (I)	Joe Gibbs Racing	Toyota
55	Jeffrey Earnhardt	Viva Motorsports	Chevrolet
60	Chris Buescher	Roush Fenway Racing	Ford
62	Brendan Gaughan	Richard Childress Racing	Chevrolet
70	Derrike Cope	Derrike Cope Racing	Chevrolet
74	Mike Harmon	Mike Harmon Racing	Dodge
88	Kevin Harvick (I)	JR Motorsports	Chevrolet
90	Mario Gosselin	King Autosport	Chevrolet
97	Peyton Sellers	Obaika Racing	Chevrolet
98	Sam Hornish Jr. (I)	Biagi–DenBeste Racing	Ford
Entry list

== Practice results ==
=== Practice 1 ===
Practice 1 was held on Friday, March 20th at 1:30 P.M. PT. Kevin Harvick was fastest in practice with the speed of 174.961 miles per hour (281.572 km/h)

Pos.	No	Driver	Team	Make	Speed
1	88	Kevin Harvick	JR Motorsports	Chevrolet	174.961
2	54	Denny Hamlin	Joe Gibbs Racing	Toyota	174.681
3	22	Brad Keselowski	Team Penske	Ford	174.338
Practice 1 results

=== Happy hour ===
Final practice sometimes referred to as happy hour was held on Friday, March 20th at 3:00 PM. Austin Dillon was fastest in practice with the time of 41.163 and the speed of 174.914 miles per hour (281.497 km/h).

Pos.	No	Driver	Team	Make	Time	Speed
1	33	Austin Dillon	Richard Childress Racing	Chevrolet	41.163	174.914
2	22	Brad Keselowski	Team Penske	Ford	41.204	174.740
3	7	Regan Smith	JR Motorsports	Chevrolet	41.437	173.758
Happy Hour results

== Qualifying ==
Qualifying was held on Saturday, March 21st at 9:45 AM. Erik Jones won the pole with a time of 40.384 and a speed of 178.288 miles per hour (286.927 km/h).

Grid	No	Driver	Team	Manufacturer	Time	Speed
1	20	Erik Jones	Joe Gibbs Racing	Chevrolet	40.384	178.288
2	2	Brian Scott	Richard Childress Racing	Chevrolet	40.521	177.686
3	54	Denny Hamlin	Joe Gibbs Racing	Toyota	40.568	177.480
4	22	Brad Keselowski	Team Penske	Ford	40.631	177.205
5	7	Regan Smith	JR Motorsports	Chevrolet	40.648	177.130
6	88	Kevin Harvick	JR Motorsports	Chevrolet	40.743	176.717
7	33	Austin Dillon	Richard Childress Racing	Chevrolet	40.785	176.535
8	62	Brendan Gaughan	Richard Childress Racing	Chevrolet	40.827	176.354
9	18	Daniel Suárez	Joe Gibbs Racing	Toyota	40.832	176.332
10	1	Elliott Sadler	Roush Fenway Racing	Ford	41.004	175.593
11	42	Kyle Larson	HScott Motorsports	Chevrolet	41.131	175.050
12	16	Ryan Reed	Roush Fenway Racing	Ford	41.139	175.016
13	9	Chase Elliott	JR Motorsports	Chevrolet	40.893	176.069
14	60	Chris Buescher	Roush Fenway Racing	Ford	40.897	176.052
15	98	Sam Hornish Jr.	Biagi–DenBeste Racing	Ford	40.944	175.850
16	3	Ty Dillon	Richard Childress Racing	Chevrolet	41.139	175.016
17	6	Bubba Wallace	Roush Fenway Racing	Ford	41.044	175.421
18	39	Ryan Sieg	RSS Racing	Chevrolet	41.161	174.923
19	43	Dakoda Armstrong	Richard Petty Motorsports	Ford	41.376	174.014
20	25	John Wes Townley	Athenian Motorsports	Chevrolet	41.388	173.963
21	8	Blake Koch	TriStar Motorsports	Toyota	41.626	172.969
22	14	Cale Conley	TriStar Motorsports	Toyota	41.631	172.948
23	28	J. J. Yeley	JGL Racing	Toyota	41.745	172.476
24	01	Landon Cassill	JD Motorsports	Chevrolet	N/A	
25	44	David Starr	TriStar Motorsports	Toyota	41.595	173.098
26	24	Eric McClure	JGL Racing	Toyota	41.697	172.674
27	55	Jeffrey Earnhardt	Viva Motorsports	Chevrolet	41.699	172.666
28	4	Ross Chastain	JD Motorsports	Chevrolet	41.702	172.654
29	51	Jeremy Clements	Jeremy Clements Racing	Chevrolet	41.762	172.406
30	19	Mike Bliss	TriStar Motorsports	Toyota	41.864	171.985
31	90	Mario Gosselin	King Autosport	Chevrolet	41.940	171.674
32	0	Harrison Rhodes	JD Motorsports	Chevrolet	41.951	171.629
33	10	Jeff Green	TriStar Motorsports	Toyota	42.074	171.127
Qualified via Owner Points
34	15	Stanton Barrett	Rick Ware Racing	Chevrolet	OP	
35	52	Joey Gase	Jimmy Means Racing	Chevrolet	OP	
36	97	Peyton Sellers	Obaika Racing	Chevrolet	OP	
37	74	Mike Harmon	Mike Harmon Racing	Dodge	OP	
38	40	Carl Long	MBM Motorsports	Dodge	OP	
39	13	Derek White	MBM Motorsports	Toyota	OP	
40	70	Derrike Cope	Derrike Cope Racing	Chevrolet	OP	
Official qualifying result

== Race results ==
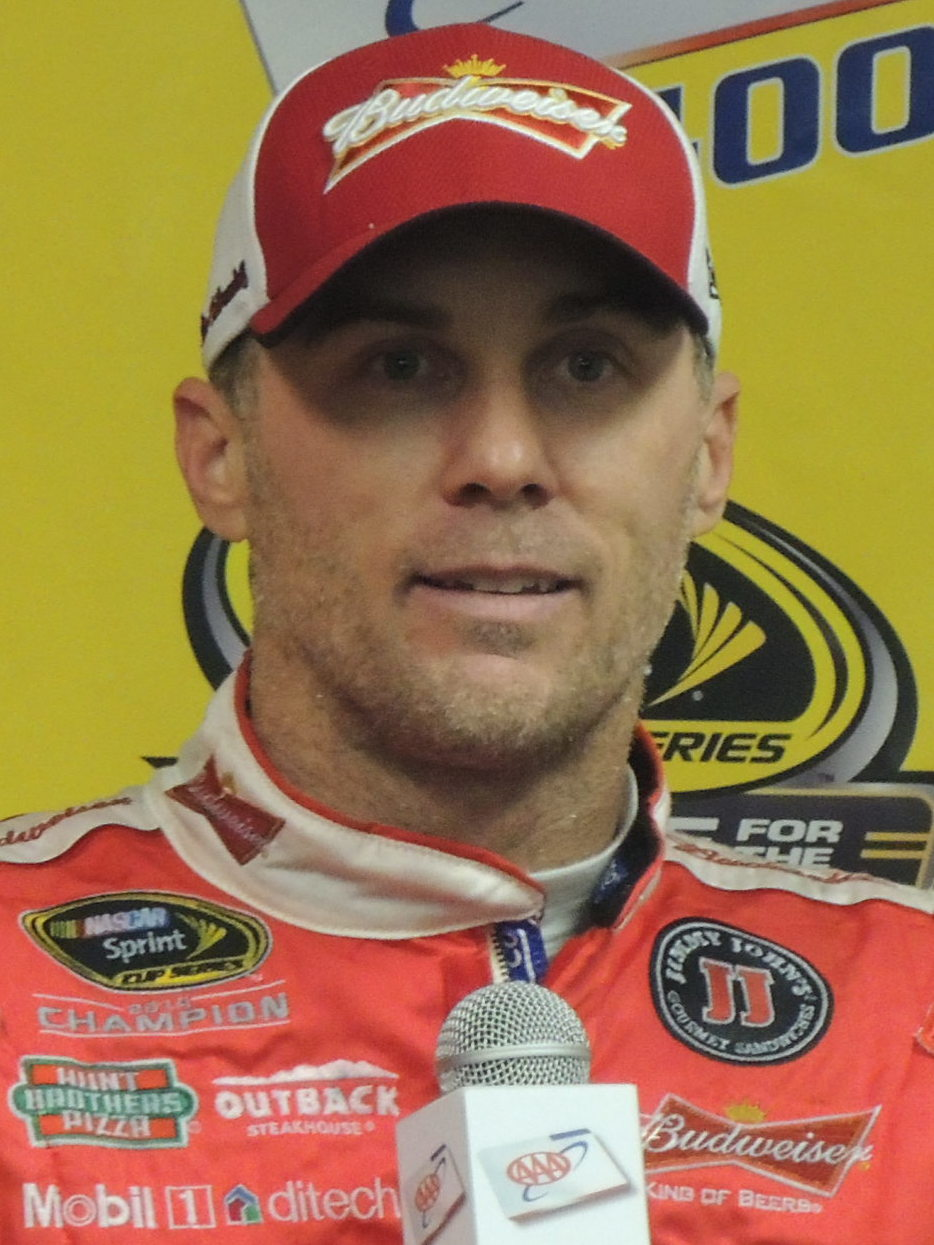
Kevin Harvick won the race.

Pos	No	Driver	Manufacturer	Laps	Status	Led	Points
1	88	Kevin Harvick	Chevrolet	150	running	100	0
2	62	Brendan Gaughan	Chevrolet	150	running	0	42
3	20	Erik Jones	Toyota	150	running	4	0
4	9	Chase Elliott	Chevrolet	150	running	0	40
5	60	Chris Buescher	Ford	150	running	0	39
6	2	Brian Scott	Chevrolet	150	running	0	38
7	42	Kyle Larson	Chevrolet	150	running	0	0
8	22	Brad Keselowski	Ford	150	running	1	0
9	7	Regan Smith	Chevrolet	150	running	4	36
10	1	Elliott Sadler	Ford	150	running	0	34
11	16	Ryan Reed	Ford	150	running	0	33
12	6	Bubba Wallace	Ford	150	running	3	33
13	18	Daniel Suárez	Toyota	150	running	0	31
14	3	Ty Dillon	Chevrolet	150	running	0	30
15	44	David Starr	Toyota	150	running	2	30
16	14	Cale Conley	Toyota	150	running	0	28
17	4	Ross Chastain	Chevrolet	150	running	0	27
18	54	Denny Hamlin	Toyota	149	running	33	0
19	8	Blake Koch	Toyota	149	running	0	25
20	39	Ryan Sieg	Chevrolet	149	running	0	24
21	01	Landon Cassill	Chevrolet	149	running	0	23
22	28	J. J. Yeley	Toyota	149	running	0	22
23	25	John Wes Townley	Chevrolet	148	running	0	0
24	51	Jeremy Clements	Chevrolet	148	running	0	20
25	0	Harrison Rhodes	Chevrolet	147	running	0	19
26	19	Mike Bliss	Toyota	146	running	0	18
27	90	Mario Gosselin	Chevrolet	146	running	0	17
28	55	Jeffrey Earnhardt	Chevrolet	146	running	3	17
29	97	Peyton Sellers	Chevrolet	145	running	0	15
30	52	Joey Gase	Chevrolet	144	running	0	14
31	70	Derrike Cope	Chevrolet	143	running	0	13
32	15	Stanton Barrett	Chevrolet	142	running	0	12
33	13	Derek White	Toyota	140	running	0	11
34	24	Eric McClure	Toyota	114	electrical	0	10
35	74	Mike Harmon	Dodge	108	engine	0	9
36	43	Dakoda Armstrong	Ford	76	suspension	0	8
37	98	Sam Hornish Jr.	Ford	47	engine	0	0
38	33	Austin Dillon	Chevrolet	42	engine	0	0
39	40	Carl Long	Dodge	18	suspension	0	5
40	10	Jeff Green	Toyota	2	brakes	0	4
Race Results

=== Race statistics ===
- 13 lead changes between 8 drivers
- 3 cautions for 12 laps
- Time of race: 2 hour, 01 minute, 51 seconds
- Average speed: 147.723 mph (237.737 km/h)

Lap Leaders
Laps	Leader
1–3	Erik Jones
4–33	Denny Hamlin
34	Brad Keselowski
35–37	Denny Hamlin
38–51	Kevin Harvick
52	Erik Jones
53	Kevin Harvick
54	Bubba Wallace
55–75	Kevin Harvick
76–77	Bubba Wallace
78–81	Regan Smith
82–83	David Starr
84–86	Jeffrey Earnhardt
87–150	Kevin Harvick

Total laps led
Leader	Laps
Kevin Harvick	100
Denny Hamlin	33
Erik Jones	4
Regan Smith	4
Bubba Wallace	3
Jeffrey Earnhardt	3
David Starr	2
Brad Keselowski	1

== Standings after the race ==
	Pos	Driver	Points
	1	Ty Dillon	187
	2	Chris Buescher	182 (–5)
1	3	Chase Elliott	172 (–15)
1	4	Ryan Reed	168 (–19)
1	5	Bubba Wallace	165 (–22)
	6	Brendan Gaughan	164 (–23)
	7	Regan Smith	157 (–30)
	8	Elliott Sadler	148 (–39)
	9	David Starr	136 (–51)
4	10	Brian Scott	134 (–53)
	10	Daniel Suárez	134 (–53)
	12	Ross Chastain	125 (–62)

- Note: Only the first 12 positions are included for the driver standings.

Previous race: 2015 Axalta Faster. Tougher. Brighter. 200	NASCAR Xfinity Series; 2015 season	Next race: 2015 O'Reilly Auto Parts 300
