= XCI Racing =

NASCAR team

- Owner: Landon Ash
- Series: NASCAR Cup Series; NASCAR Xfinity Series
- Manufacturer: Toyota
- Opened: 2019
- Closed: 2019

Career
- Debut: Cup Series: 2019 GEICO 500 (Talladega); Xfinity Series: 2019 My Bariatric Solutions 300 (Texas)
- Races competed: Total: 4 Cup Series: 1 Xfinity Series: 3
- Drivers' Championships: 0
- Race victories: 0
- Pole positions: 0

Xtreme Concepts Inc. Racing, also known as XCI Racing, was an American professional stock car racing team owned by Landon Ash and was a subsidiary of Xtreme Concepts Inc. The team last competed part-time in 2019 in the NASCAR Cup Series, fielding the No. 81 Toyota Camry for Jeffrey Earnhardt and part-time in the NASCAR Xfinity Series, fielding the No. 81 Toyota Supra for Earnhardt and Erik Jones as well. XCI Racing had a technical alliance with Joe Gibbs Racing.

== NASCAR Cup Series ==
The team scheduled to attempt both Talladega races in 2019 with Earnhardt in the No. 81 Camry. Team executive Landon Ash has stated that the goal of XCI Racing is to run a full schedule in the Monster Energy NASCAR Cup Series. On August 7, 2019, Earnhardt announced that he parted ways with sponsor and XCI affiliate iK9, as well as Joe Gibbs Racing.

=== NASCAR Cup Series results ===
Year	Driver	No.	Make	1	2	3	4	5	6	7	8	9	10	11	12	13	14	15	16	17	18	19	20	21	22	23	24	25	26	27	28	29	30	31	32	33	34	35	36	MENCC	Pts	Ref
2019	Jeffrey Earnhardt	81	Toyota	DAY	ATL	LVS	PHO	CAL	MAR	TEX	BRI	RCH	TAL; 22	DOV	KAN	CLT	POC	MCH	SON	CHI	DAY	KEN	NHA	POC	GLN	MCH	BRI	DAR	IND	LVS	RCH	CLT	DOV	TAL	KAN	MAR	TEX	PHO	HOM	-*	-*	

== NASCAR Xfinity Series ==
The team attempted five races with Earnhardt in the No. 81 Supra, beginning at Texas in March. Additional races include Chicagoland Speedway in June, Daytona International Speedway in July and Bristol Motor Speedway and Darlington Raceway in August. On July 3, 2019, XCI Racing unexpectedly withdrew from the July Daytona race. On August 7, 2019, Earnhardt announced that he parted ways with sponsor and XCI affiliate iK9, as well as Joe Gibbs Racing. JGR driver Erik Jones took over the No. 81 car at the Bristol night race, where he finished 37th after being involved in a multi-car pileup with Christopher Bell, Cole Custer, and Joey Logano.

=== NASCAR Xfinity Series results ===
Year	Driver	No.	Make	1	2	3	4	5	6	7	8	9	10	11	12	13	14	15	16	17	18	19	20	21	22	23	24	25	26	27	28	29	30	31	32	33	NXSC	Pts	Ref
2019	Jeffrey Earnhardt	81	Toyota	DAY	ATL	LVS	PHO	CAL	TEX; 8	BRI	RCH	TAL	DOV	CLT	POC	MCH	IOW	CHI; 16	DAY; Wth	KEN	NHA	IOW	GLN	MOH													-*	-*	
2019	Erik Jones	81	Toyota																						BRI; 37	ROA	DAR	IND	LVS	RCH	CLT	DOV	KAN	TEX	PHO	HOM	-*	-*	
