= Stan Mullis =

American racing driver (born 1976)

- Born: Stan C. Mullis; October 17, 1976 (age 50); Las Vegas, Nevada, U.S.

NASCAR O'Reilly Auto Parts Series career
- 11 races run over 4 years
- 2020 position: 63rd
- Best finish: 60th (2019)
- First race: 2017 U.S. Cellular 250 (Iowa)
- Last race: 2020 Desert Diamond Casino West Valley 200 (Phoenix)
Wins	Top tens	Poles
0	0	0
- Statistics up to date as of November 7, 2020.

Stan C. Mullis (born October 17, 1976) is an American professional stock car racing driver. He last competed part-time in the NASCAR Xfinity Series, driving the No. 13 Toyota Supra for MBM Motorsports.

== Racing career ==
=== NASCAR Whelen All-American Series ===
Mullis regularly drives at Las Vegas Motor Speedway in the No. 20 Port City car with sponsorship from his company, TLC Resorts Vacation Club.

=== NASCAR Xfinity Series ===
In 2017, Mullis made his NASCAR debut in the No. 40 Chevrolet Camaro for MBM Motorsports at Iowa. He started 39th and finished 32nd.

In 2018, Mullis returned to MBM Motorsports, but drove the No. 66 Chevrolet instead, once again at Iowa. This time, he started 38th and finished 33rd.

Mullis returned in 2019 for six races, scoring a best finish of 23rd at Iowa.

In 2020, Mullis made a one-off appearance at the season finale at Phoenix with MBM's No. 66, finishing 28th.

In 2022, Mullis would attempt the No. 13 for two races, but he failed to qualify for both of them.

=== ARCA Menards Series ===
After not competing in stock cars for the next three years, it was revealed in 2026 that Mullis would participate in the pre-season test for the ARCA Menards Series at Daytona International Speedway, driving the No. 66 Chevrolet for MBM Motorsports, where he set the 67th quickest time between the two sessions held.

== Personal life ==
Outside of racing, Mullis is a businessman, and owns a vacation timeshare company called TLC Resorts which would later sponsor him in his Xfinity Series races. The business first started in 2009.

== Motorsports career results ==
=== NASCAR ===
(key) (Bold – Pole position awarded by qualifying time. Italics – Pole position earned by points standings or practice time. * – Most laps led.)

==== Xfinity Series ====
NASCAR Xfinity Series results
Year	Team	No.	Make	1	2	3	4	5	6	7	8	9	10	11	12	13	14	15	16	17	18	19	20	21	22	23	24	25	26	27	28	29	30	31	32	33	NXSC	Pts	Ref
2017	MBM Motorsports	40	Chevy	DAY	ATL	LVS	PHO	CAL	TEX	BRI	RCH	TAL	CLT	DOV	POC	MCH	IOW	DAY	KEN	NHA	IND	IOW; 32	GLN	MOH	BRI	ROA	DAR	RCH	CHI	KEN	DOV	CLT	KAN	TEX	PHO	HOM	76th	5	
2018	MBM Motorsports	66	Chevy	DAY	ATL	LVS	PHO	CAL	TEX	BRI	RCH	TAL	DOV	CLT	POC	MCH	IOW; 33	CHI	DAY	KEN	NHA	IOW; 33	GLN	MOH	BRI	ROA	DAR	IND									73rd	9	
2018	MBM Motorsports	13	Toyota																										LVS; 37	RCH	CLT	DOV	KAN	TEX	PHO	HOM	73rd	9	
2019	MBM Motorsports	13	Toyota	DAY	ATL	LVS; 35	PHO; 36	CAL	TEX	BRI	RCH	TAL	DOV	CLT	POC	MCH													LVS; 35	RCH; 37	CLT	DOV	KAN	TEX	PHO	HOM	60th	29	
2019	MBM Motorsports	66	Toyota														IOW; 28	CHI	DAY	KEN	NHA	IOW; 23	GLN	MOH	BRI	ROA	DAR	IND									60th	29	
2020	MBM Motorsports	66	Toyota	DAY	LVS	CAL	PHO	DAR	CLT	BRI	ATL	HOM	HOM	TAL	POC	IND	KEN	KEN	TEX	KAN	ROA	DAY	DOV	DOV	DAY	DAR	RCH	RCH	BRI	LVS	TAL	CLT	KAN	TEX	MAR	PHO; 28	63rd	9	
2022	MBM Motorsports	13	Toyota	DAY	CAL	LVS; DNQ	PHO; DNQ	ATL	COA	RCH	MAR	TAL	DOV	DAR	TEX	CLT	PIR	NSH	ROA	ATL	NHA	POC	IND	MCH	GLN	DAY	DAR	KAN	BRI	TEX	TAL	CLT	LVS	HOM	MAR	PHO	N/A	0	

^{*} Season still in progress
^{1} Ineligible for series points
