= 2019 Alsco 300 =

2019 Alsco 300 may refer to the following 2019 NASCAR Xfinity Series races:

- 2019 Alsco 300 (Bristol), Bristol Motor Speedway, Tennessee, U.S.
- 2019 Alsco 300 (Charlotte), Charlotte Motor Speedway, North Carolina, U.S.
- 2019 Alsco 300 (Kentucky), Kentucky Speedway, Kentucky, U. S.
