= Shane Lee (racing driver) =

American racing driver

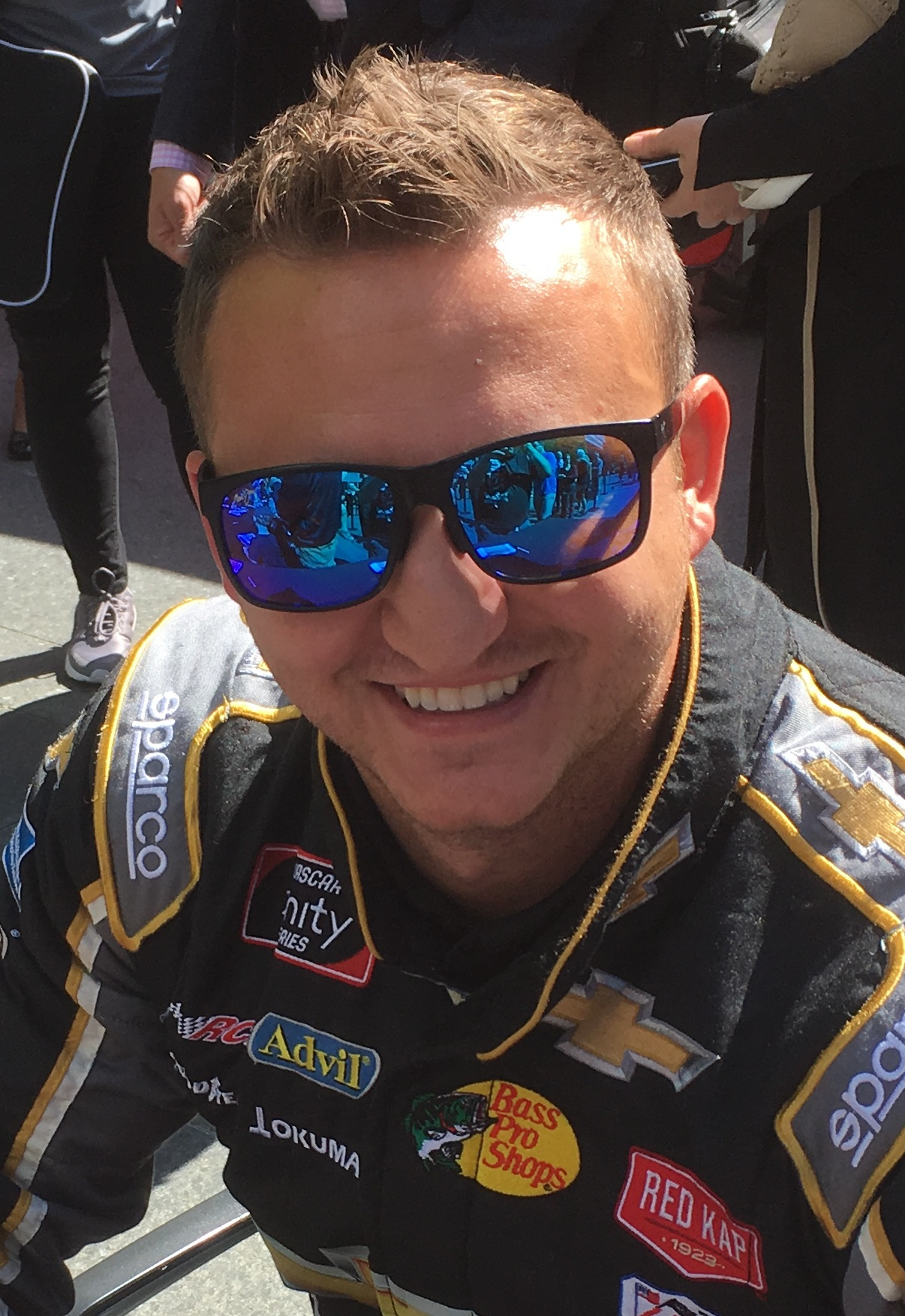
- Lee in 2018
- Born: Shane S. Lee; July 4, 1993 (age 33); Newton, North Carolina, U.S.
- Awards: Whelen All-American Series 2013 Rookie of the Year

NASCAR O'Reilly Auto Parts Series career
- 25 races run over 3 years
- 2022 position: 47th
- Best finish: 25th (2018)
- First race: 2018 Fitzgerald Glider Kits 300 (Bristol)
- Last race: 2022 Alsco Uniforms 300 (Charlotte)
Wins	Top tens	Poles
0	4	0

NASCAR FedEx Freight Truck Series career
- 3 races run over 1 year
- 2016 position: 38th
- Best finish: 38th (2016)
- First race: 2016 Alpha Energy Solutions 250 (Martinsville)
- Last race: 2016 Striping Technology 350 (Texas)
Wins	Top tens	Poles
0	0	0
- Statistics up to date as of May 28, 2022.

Shane S. Lee (born July 4, 1993) is an American professional stock car racing driver. He last competed part-time in the NASCAR Xfinity Series, driving the No. 35 and Toyota Supra/Ford Mustangs for Emerling-Gase Motorsports. He has also competed in the NASCAR Camping World Truck Series and the ARCA Racing Series.

== Racing career ==
=== Early years ===
Racing at Hickory Speedway in his youth, Lee was simultaneously Most Popular Driver and Rookie of the Year in the track's Limited Late Model class in 2012. He was Rookie of the Year in the NASCAR Whelen All-American Series in 2013.

=== ARCA Racing Series ===
Lee, at the beginning of the 2016 ARCA Racing Series, tested with Win-Tron Racing at Daytona International Speedway in preparation of making his first start in the Lucas Oil 200. The original schedule called for Lee to run nine races. He ran ten, winning the pole at Chicagoland Speedway but otherwise struggling to finish in the top ten early in the season. He picked up his performance later in the season, which translated to a full-time ARCA ride with Cunningham Motorsports for 2017. With a constant teammate in Dalton Sargeant, Lee led laps in four races and scored a top-five in his first road course race on his way to a third-place points finish behind champion Austin Theriault and teammate Sargeant.

=== NASCAR ===
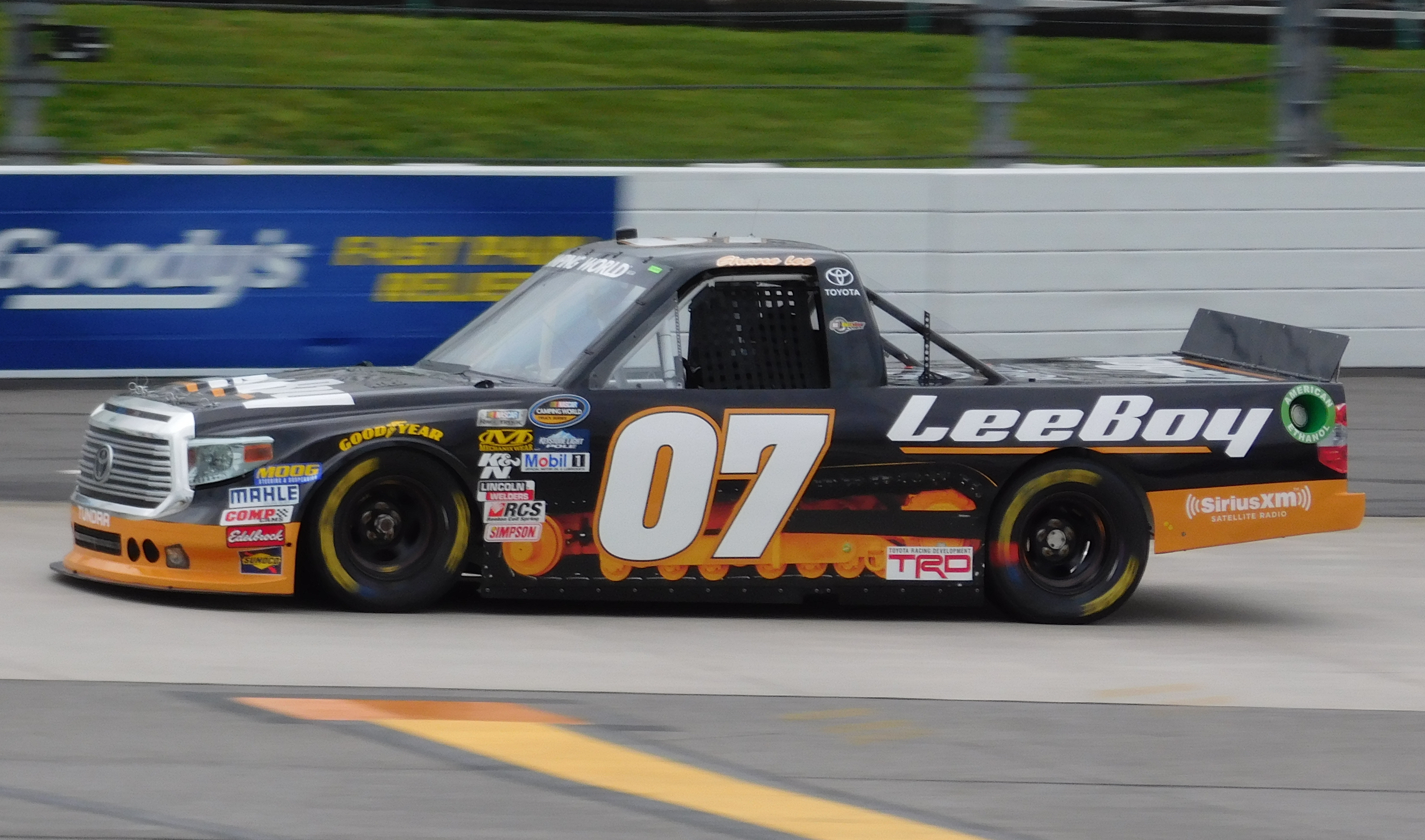
Lee's debut truck at Martinsville Speedway in 2016.

On March 23, 2016, it was announced that Lee would make his NASCAR Camping World Truck Series debut for SS-Green Light Racing at Martinsville Speedway in April of that year. He finished seventeenth in his debut and ran another race for SS-Green Light at Gateway Motorsports Park before signing with GMS Racing to drive their No. 24 truck at Texas Motor Speedway late in the season. He finished sixteenth and on the lead lap in that race, marking his third consecutive lead-lap finish.

After focusing on the ARCA Racing Series in 2017, it was announced on January 24, 2018, that Lee would drive part-time in the NASCAR Xfinity Series for Richard Childress Racing, splitting the organization's No. 3 car with Austin and Ty Dillon, Jeb Burton, and Brendan Gaughan. Issues plagued his early runs, with a blown tire ruining a potential top-five in his debut at Bristol Motor Speedway and a shortage of gas hindering his effort at Talladega Superspeedway. At Pocono, Lee had a solid run finishing twelfth, and then finishing 16th at Iowa. At Daytona in July, Lee had a great run. He was in the top-ten for the majority of the race, finishing a career-best sixth-place finish. Then at the second Iowa race, he finished thirteenth.

In May 2019, Lee joined the newly-formed H2 Motorsports to run the remaining Xfinity schedule (with the exception of the road courses) in the No. 28 Circuit City-sponsored Toyota starting with the CircuitCity.com 250 at Iowa in June. Although he had signed a deal with H2 for the entirety of the 2020 NASCAR Xfinity Series season, he was released by the team for "performance-based" reasons before the Sport Clips VFW 200 at Darlington in August.

In 2022, Lee returned to the Xfinity series driving for Emerling-Gase Motorsports. At Daytona, he finished 33rd. Atlanta, he finished 17th. At Martinsville, he finished 27th. He scored a fourteenth-place finish at Talladega.

== Motorsports career results ==
=== NASCAR ===
(key) (Bold – Pole position awarded by qualifying time. Italics – Pole position earned by points standings or practice time. * – Most laps led.)

==== Xfinity Series ====
NASCAR Xfinity Series results
Year	Team	No.	Make	1	2	3	4	5	6	7	8	9	10	11	12	13	14	15	16	17	18	19	20	21	22	23	24	25	26	27	28	29	30	31	32	33	NXSC	Pts	Ref
2018	Richard Childress Racing	3	Chevy	DAY	ATL	LVS	PHO	CAL	TEX	BRI; 14	RCH	TAL; 15	DOV	CLT	POC; 12	MCH	IOW; 16	CHI	DAY; 6	KEN	NHA	IOW; 13	GLN	MOH	BRI	ROA	DAR	IND	LVS; 30	RCH; 9	CLT	DOV; 17	KAN; 4	TEX; 23	PHO; 14	HOM; 20	25th	315	
2019	H2 Motorsports	28	Toyota	DAY	ATL	LVS	PHO	CAL	TEX	BRI	RCH	TAL	DOV	CLT	POC	MCH	IOW; 18	CHI; 18	DAY; 21	KEN; 16	NHA; 33	IOW; 7	GLN	MOH	BRI; 13	ROA	DAR; Wth	IND	LVS	RCH	CLT	DOV	KAN	TEX	PHO	HOM	34th	133	
2022	Emerling-Gase Motorsports	35	Toyota	DAY; 33	CAL	LVS	PHO	ATL; 17	COA	RCH						CLT; 24	PIR	NSH	ROA	ATL	NHA	POC	IND	MCH	GLN	DAY	DAR	KAN	BRI	TEX	TAL	CLT	LVS	HOM	MAR	PHO	47th	71	
2022	Emerling-Gase Motorsports	35	Ford								MAR; 27																										47th	71	
2022	Emerling-Gase Motorsports	53	Ford									TAL; 14	DOV	DAR	TEX																						47th	71	

==== Camping World Truck Series ====
NASCAR Camping World Truck Series results
Year	Team	No.	Make	1	2	3	4	5	6	7	8	9	10	11	12	13	14	15	16	17	18	19	20	21	22	23	NCWTC	Pts	Ref
2016	Win-Tron Racing	07	Toyota	DAY	ATL	MAR; 17	KAN	DOV	CLT	TEX	IOW	GTW; 16	KEN	ELD	POC	BRI	MCH	MSP	CHI	NHA	LVS	TAL	MAR				38th	50	
2016	GMS Racing	24	Chevy																					TEX; 16	PHO	HOM	38th	50	

^{*} Season still in progress
^{1} Ineligible for series points

=== ARCA Racing Series ===
ARCA Racing Series results
Year	Team	No.	Make	1	2	3	4	5	6	7	8	9	10	11	12	13	14	15	16	17	18	19	20	ARSC	Pts	Ref
2016	Win-Tron Racing	32	Toyota	DAY; 38	NSH; 16	SLM; 12	TAL; 11	TOL	NJE	POC; 14	MCH; 10	MAD	WIN	IOW	IRP	POC; 4	BLN	ISF	DSF	SLM	**CHI**; 21	KEN; 9	KAN; 8	16th	1615	
2017	Cunningham Motorsports	22	Ford	DAY; 3	NSH; 12	SLM; 4	TAL; 5	TOL; 22	ELK; 7	POC; 28	MCH; 15	MAD; 4	**IOW**; 11*	IRP; 9	POC; 13	WIN; 6	ISF; 5	ROA; 4	DSF; 6*	SLM; 9	CHI; 8	KEN; 5	KAN; 4	3rd	4735	

=== CARS Late Model Stock Car Tour ===
(key) (Bold – Pole position awarded by qualifying time. Italics – Pole position earned by points standings or practice time. * – Most laps led. ** – All laps led.)

CARS Late Model Stock Car Tour results
Year	Team	No.	Make	1	2	3	4	5	6	7	8	9	10	CLMSCTC	Pts	Ref
2015	Mike Lee	00	Chevy	SNM	ROU	HCY; 6	SNM	TCM; 24	MMS	ROU	CON	MYB	HCY; 6	28th	63	
