= Vinnie Miller =

American racing driver (born 1997)

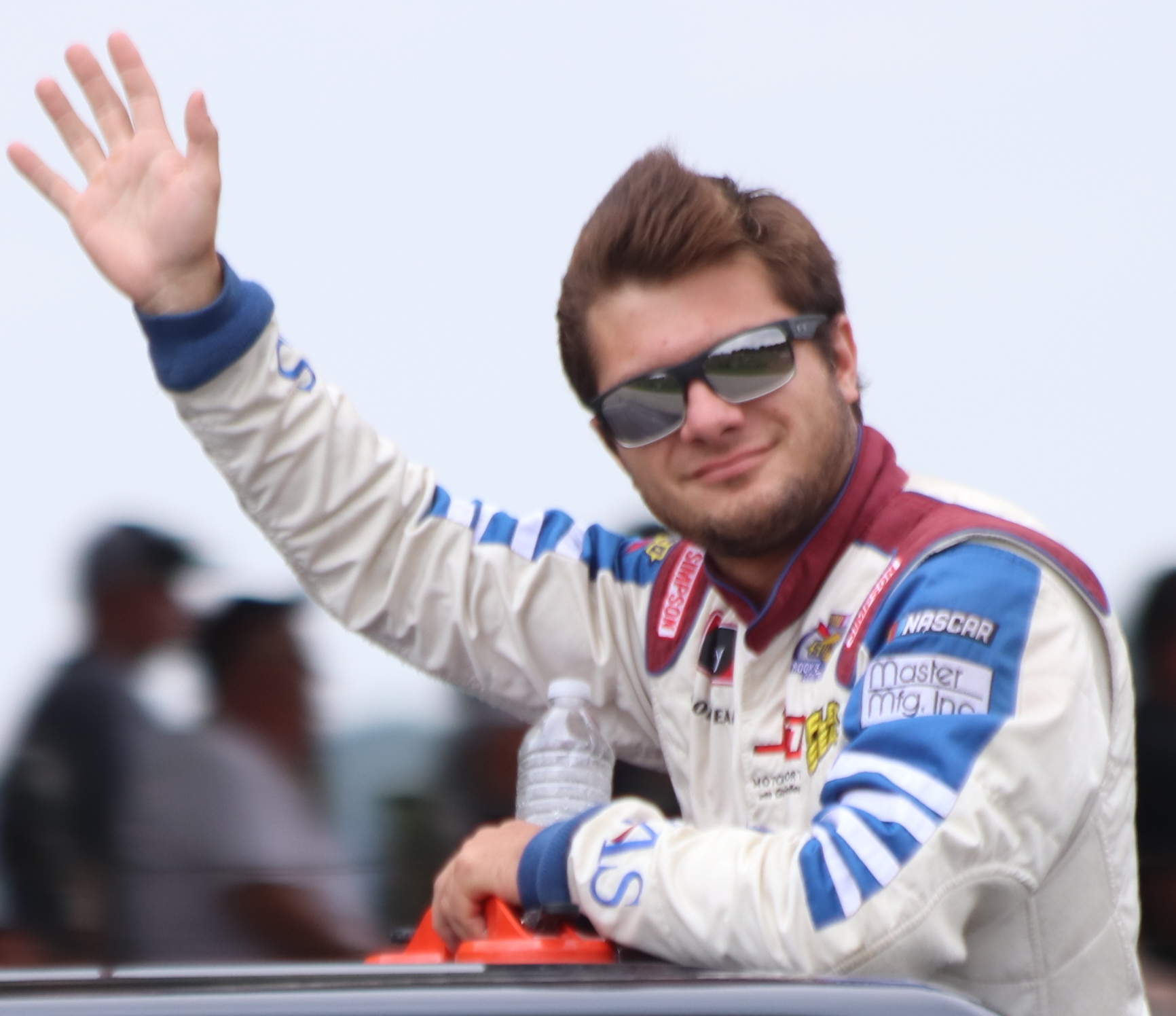
- Miller at Road America in 2018
- Born: Vance Matthew Miller; August 16, 1997 (age 29); Metamora, Michigan, U.S.

NASCAR O'Reilly Auto Parts Series career
- 95 races run over 4 years
- 2020 position: 27th
- Best finish: 23rd (2019)
- First race: 2017 TheHouse.com 300 (Chicagoland)
- Last race: 2020 Kansas Lottery 300 (Kansas)
Wins	Top tens	Poles
0	0	0

NASCAR FedEx Freight Truck Series career
- 1 race run over 1 year
- 2017 position: 83rd
- Best finish: 83rd (2017)
- First race: 2017 Fred's 250 (Talladega)
Wins	Top tens	Poles
0	1	0
- Statistics up to date as of November 9, 2020.

Vance Matthew "Vinnie" Miller (born August 16, 1997) is an American professional stock car racing driver. He last competed part-time in the NASCAR Xfinity Series, driving the No. 78 Chevrolet Camaro/Toyota Supra for B. J. McLeod Motorsports.

Miller has previously driven for JD Motorsports in the Xfinity Series, Bolen Motorsports in the NASCAR Camping World Truck Series, MDM Motorsports in the K&N Pro Series East and the ARCA Racing Series, and Wauters Motorsports in the CARS Super Late Model Tour.

== Racing career ==
=== Early years ===
After starting racing with quarter midgets at age five, Miller spent his formative years racing on Michigan short tracks, some being the same as NASCAR Cup Series drivers Brad Keselowski and Erik Jones. He focused on Owosso Speedway, driving late models. Miller also competed in super late models, Pro All Stars Series, New Smyrna Speedway's Speedweeks and the 602 Tour.

In 2015, Miller signed with Wauters Motorsports to run super late models in the CARS Super Series, PASS Late Model Series and the Southern Super Series. During the CARS series, Miller split his time between Wauters and Crooks Racing, scoring a best finish of twelfth at Concord Speedway with Crooks. He drove for his own team in 2016, only finishing one of his five CARS attempts.

=== Developmental series ===
Miller signed with MDM Motorsports for a limited ARCA Racing Series schedule in 2017. The pairing came about through Miller's agent, whom he raced with in Michigan for five years. In six races he scored four top tens, two coming on short tracks and two coming on superspeedways. During his home race at Michigan International Speedway, he would start from the front row and lead laps for the first time in ARCA competition, leading six in total before being involved in an accident with Riley Herbst while the two were racing for the lead. Miller also competed in six races for MDM in the NASCAR K&N Pro Series East, scoring top tens in both races at South Boston Speedway.

=== NASCAR ===
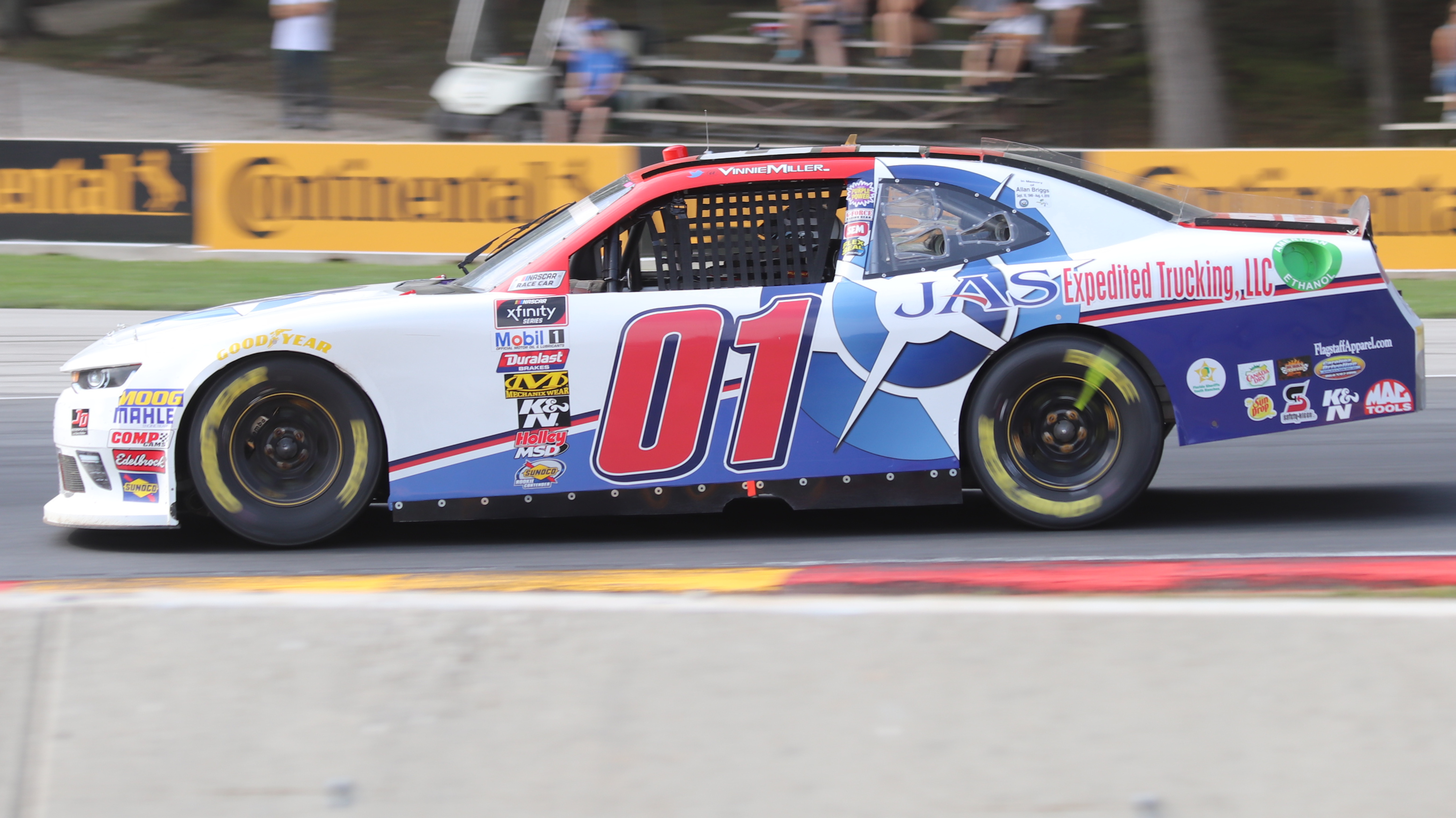
Miller in the JD Motorsports car in 2018

Miller signed with JD Motorsports for his NASCAR debut, which would come in the Xfinity Series in the No. 0 car replacing regular driver Garrett Smithley at Chicagoland Speedway. He finished 29th, seven laps down. Later on, Miller signed with Bolen Motorsports to make his Camping World Truck Series debut at Talladega Superspeedway. He avoided a last-lap wreck to score a seventh-place finish, tying the best finish for the team up to that point.

On November 28, 2017, it was announced that Miller would become the full-time driver of JD Motorsports' No. 01 entry in 2018, inheriting the ride driven by Harrison Rhodes in 2017.

On September 22, 2018, it was announced that Miller left JD Motorsports and would join the No. 78 entry for B. J. McLeod Motorsports for the remaining six races of the season and a full schedule in 2019. The deal for 2019 had been worked out during the summer, and JDM team owner Johnny Davis granted Miller a release from his team to get acclimated to the BJMM team earlier. Late in his rookie season, Miller highlighted road course racing as something he would like to improve at for his sophomore season. Miller would also drive the team's No. 5 and 99 cars over the next two years,

== Personal life ==
Miller grew up residing in the town of Metamora, Michigan, and graduated from Brandon High School in the nearby town of Ortonville. He is an avid outdoorsman and enjoys hunting, fishing, boating, and snowmobiling when away from the racetrack. He also enjoys golfing and diving. He has stated that, were he not a race car driver, he would like to own an aquarium shop.

Miller credits his late grandfather Vance Weedon and his grandmother Julie Weedon for getting him involved in racing and for being the biggest influences on his life.

Miller currently resides near the town of Statesville, North Carolina, where he is opening his own Aquatics shop, under the name River & Reef Aquatics.

== Motorsports career results ==
=== NASCAR ===
(key) (Bold – Pole position awarded by qualifying time. Italics – Pole position earned by points standings or practice time. * – Most laps led.)

==== Xfinity Series ====
NASCAR Xfinity Series results
Year	Team	No.	Make	1	2	3	4	5	6	7	8	9	10	11	12	13	14	15	16	17	18	19	20	21	22	23	24	25	26	27	28	29	30	31	32	33	NXSC	Pts	Ref
2017	JD Motorsports	0	Chevy	DAY	ATL	LVS	PHO	CAL	TEX	BRI	RCH	TAL	CLT	DOV	POC	MCH	IOW	DAY	KEN	NHA	IND	IOW	GLN	MOH	BRI	ROA	DAR	RCH	CHI; 29	KEN	DOV	CLT	KAN	TEX	PHO	HOM	73rd	8	
2018	JD Motorsports	01	Chevy	DAY; 20	ATL; 31	LVS; 24	PHO; 33	CAL; 27	TEX; 39	BRI; 33	RCH; 31	TAL; 17	DOV; 22	CLT; 28	POC; 31	MCH; 25	IOW; 31	CHI; 27	DAY; 19	KEN; 29	NHA; 27	IOW; 29	GLN; 35	MOH; 36	BRI; 32	ROA; 27		IND; 17	LVS; 26	RCH; 37							27th	279	
2018	JD Motorsports	0	Chevy																								DAR; 37										27th	279	
2018	B. J. McLeod Motorsports	78	Chevy																												CLT; 31	DOV; 25	KAN; 22	TEX; 27	PHO; 36	HOM; 40	27th	279	
2019	B. J. McLeod Motorsports	78	Toyota	DAY; 25								TAL; 19							DAY; 11																		23rd	358	
2019	B. J. McLeod Motorsports	78	Chevy		ATL; 32	LVS; 26	PHO; 23	CAL; 25	TEX; 25	BRI; 24	RCH; 27		DOV; 32	CLT; 23	POC; 25	MCH; 28	IOW; 32	CHI; 29		KEN; 25	NHA; 27	IOW; 20	GLN; 36		BRI; 21		DAR; 28	IND; 26	LVS; 30			DOV; 20	KAN; 30				23rd	358	
2019	B. J. McLeod Motorsports	5	Chevy																					MOH; 25		ROA; 28				RCH; 35	CLT; 25			TEX; 24	PHO; 31	HOM; 26	23rd	358	
2020	B. J. McLeod Motorsports	78	Toyota	DAY; 14										TAL; 21											DAY; 11						TAL; 22	CLT	KAN; 31	TEX	MAR	PHO	27th	298	
2020	B. J. McLeod Motorsports	78	Chevy		LVS; 28	CAL; 15	PHO; 27	DAR; 29	CLT; 23	BRI; 12	ATL; 31	HOM; 34	HOM; 29		POC; 18	IND; 32	KEN; 23	KEN; 28	TEX; 25	KAN; 30			DOV; 28	DOV; 36													27th	298	
2020	B. J. McLeod Motorsports	5	Chevy																		ROA; 34	DAY				DAR; 28											27th	298	
2020	B. J. McLeod Motorsports	99	Chevy																								RCH; 30	RCH; 32	BRI; 33	LVS; 34							27th	298	

==== Camping World Truck Series ====
NASCAR Camping World Truck Series results
Year	Team	No.	Make	1	2	3	4	5	6	7	8	9	10	11	12	13	14	15	16	17	18	19	20	21	22	23	NCWTC	Pts	Ref
2017	Bolen Motorsports	66	Chevy	DAY	ATL	MAR	KAN	CLT	DOV	TEX	GTW	IOW	KEN	ELD	POC	MCH	BRI	MSP	CHI	NHA	LVS	TAL; 7	MAR	TEX	PHO	HOM	83rd	0^{1}	

==== K&N Pro Series East ====
NASCAR K&N Pro Series East results
Year	Team	No.	Make	1	2	3	4	5	6	7	8	9	10	11	12	13	14	NKNPSEC	Pts	Ref
2017	MDM Motorsports	41	Toyota	NSM; 13	GRE	BRI; 16	SBO; 10	SBO; 3	MEM	BLN	TMP	NHA; 21	IOW; 26	GLN	LGY	NJM	DOV	13th	175	

^{*} Season still in progress
^{1} Ineligible for series points

=== ARCA Racing Series ===
(key) (Bold – Pole position awarded by qualifying time. Italics – Pole position earned by points standings or practice time. * – Most laps led.)

ARCA Racing Series results
Year	Team	No.	Make	1	2	3	4	5	6	7	8	9	10	11	12	13	14	15	16	17	18	19	20	ARSC	Pts	Ref
2017	MDM Motorsports	8	Toyota	DAY	NSH; 25	SLM	TAL																	28th	1020	
2017	MDM Motorsports	41	Toyota					TOL; 9	ELK	POC; 10	MCH; 10	MAD	IOW; 6	IRP	POC	WIN	ISF	ROA	DSF	SLM	CHI	KEN; 13	KAN	28th	1020	

=== CARS Super Late Model Tour ===
(key)

CARS Super Late Model Tour results
Year	Team	No.	Make	1	2	3	4	5	6	7	8	9	10	CSLMTC	Pts	Ref
2015	Wauters Motorsports	5M	Ford	SNM	ROU	HCY	SNM	TCM; 14	MMS	ROU				31st	55	
2015	Gary Crooks	16M	Ford								CON; 12	MYB; 18	HCY; DNQ	31st	55	
2016	Vinnie Miller	77	Ford	SNM	ROU	HCY; 21	TCM	GRE						24th	67	
2016	Vinnie Miller	16M	Ford						ROU; 16	CON; 17	MYB	HCY; 11	SNM; 17	24th	67	
