= H2 Motorsports =

NASCAR team

- Owner: Matt Hurley
- Series: NASCAR Xfinity Series
- Manufacturer: Toyota
- Opened: 2019
- Closed: 2020

Career
- Debut: 2019 CircuitCity.com 250 (Iowa)
- Latest race: 2019 Food City 300 (Bristol)
- Races competed: 7
- Drivers' Championships: 0
- Race victories: 0
- Pole positions: 0

H2 Motorsports was an American professional stock car racing team owned by Matt Hurley. The team operated part-time in the NASCAR Xfinity Series, fielding the No. 28 Toyota Supra for Shane Lee. The team raced for one season. H2 Motorsports' assets were purchased by Sam Hunt Racing for the 2020 season.

== Founder ==
Founder Matt Hurley was born April 5, 1996. Hurley graduated from Cypress Lake High School in Fort Myers, Florida, and claims to have worked at least 40 hours per week since he was 14 years old. Hurley once described himself as an "investor, entrepreneur, and political hack."

Hurley founded H2 Motorsports and based it in Mooresville, North Carolina. H2's primary sponsor was Circuit City. An entrepreneur, Hurley has started additional businesses such as H2 Innovation Center, and Youngbloods, Inc., a private holding company which later changed its name to the H2 Organization. Hurley co-founded Torchlight Productions, a website design and development firm at the age of 15.

== Xfinity Series ==
The team announced on May 23, 2019, that they would attempt twenty races with Lee in the No. 28 Toyota Supra, beginning at Iowa in June with Circuit City as the sponsor for all races. In late summer 2019, it was revealed that Lee was signed for all of 2020, and that depending on sponsorship, the team could expand to two cars for 2020.

Due to concerns that their cars would not be ready in time for the three road course races in August with being a new team, H2 decided to skip those races (at Watkins Glen, Mid-Ohio, and Road America) and better prepare for the upcoming oval races.

Before the race at Darlington in September, they released Lee due to what they deemed a lack of performance. Lee finished in the top 21 in all but one of his races and finished in the top 10 at Iowa. No replacement driver was announced, and the team didn't attempt any of the remaining races of the 2019 season. During the offseason, it was announced that the team would shut down and sell their remaining assets to Sam Hunt Racing for the upcoming 2020 season.

=== Car No. 28 results ===
Year	Driver	No.	Make	1	2	3	4	5	6	7	8	9	10	11	12	13	14	15	16	17	18	19	20	21	22	23	24	25	26	27	28	29	30	31	32	33	NXSC	Pts
2019	Shane Lee	28	Toyota	DAY	ATL	LVS	PHO	CAL	TEX	BRI	RCH	TAL	DOV	CLT	POC	MCH	IOW; 18	CHI; 18	DAY; 21	KEN; 16	NHA; 33	IOW; 7	GLN	MOH	BRI; 13	ROA	DAR	IND	LVS	RCH	CLT	DOV	KAN	TEX	PHO	HOM	36th	217
