= 2019 CircuitCity.com 250 =

Race details
- Race 14 of 33 in the 2019 NASCAR Xfinity Series season
- Date: June 16, 2019
- Location: Iowa Speedway in Newton, Iowa
- Course: Permanent racing facility
- Course length: 0.875 miles (1.408 km)
- Distance: 250 laps, 218.75 mi (352.044 km)

Pole position
Driver	Cole Custer	Stewart-Haas Racing with Biagi-DenBeste Racing
- Time: 23.779

Most laps led
Driver	Christopher Bell	Joe Gibbs Racing
- Laps: 186

Winner
No. 20	Christopher Bell	Joe Gibbs Racing

Television in the United States
- Network: FS1

Radio in the United States
- Radio: MRN

The 2019 CircuitCity.com 250 was a NASCAR Xfinity Series race held on June 16, 2019, at Iowa Speedway in Newton, Iowa. Contested over 250 laps on the 0.8-mile (1.3 km) D-shaped oval, it was the 14th race of the 2019 NASCAR Xfinity Series season.

== Background ==
=== Track ===
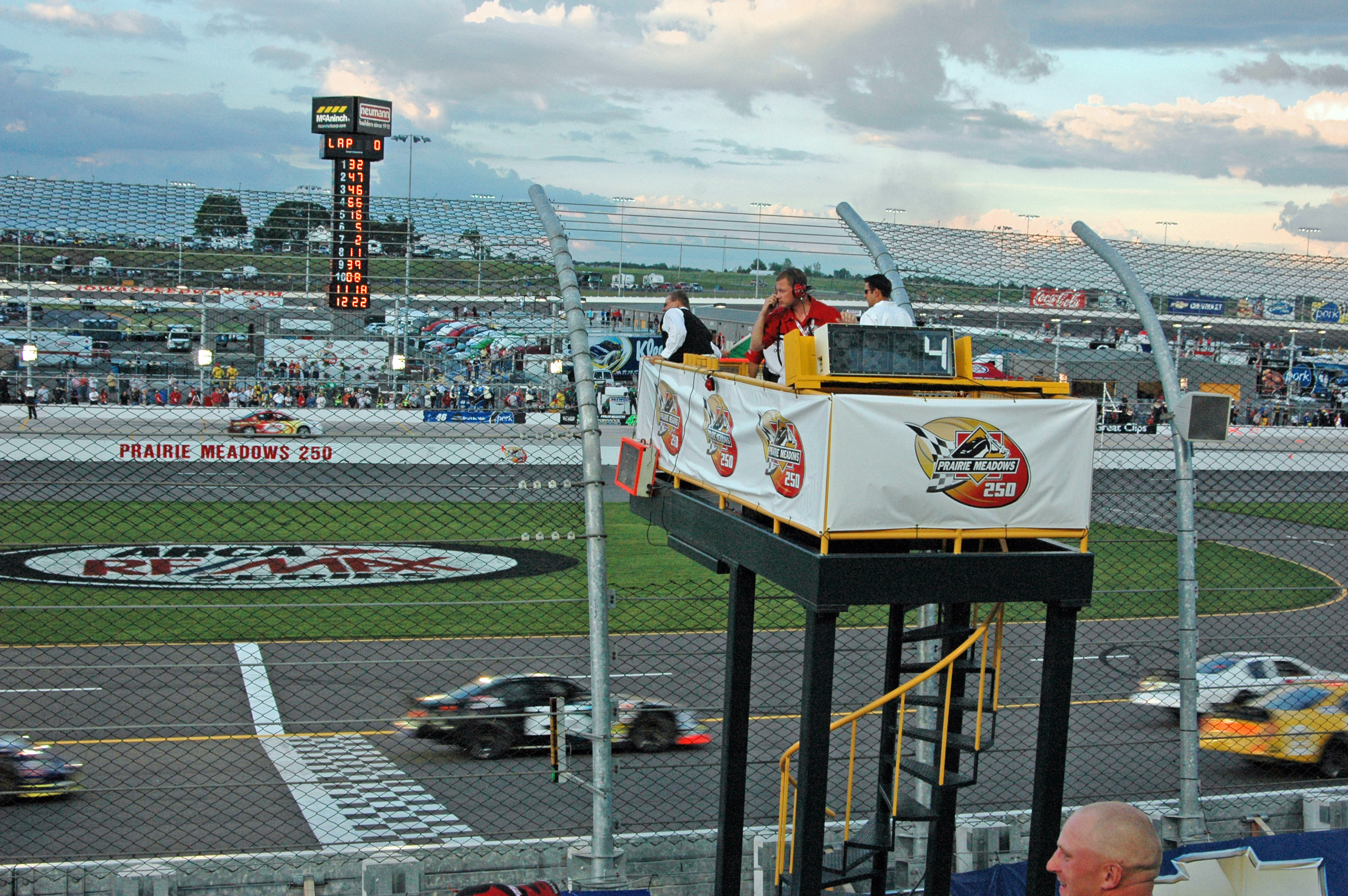
Flagstand of Iowa Speedway in June 2007, the track where the race was held.

Iowa Speedway is a 7/8-mile (1.4 km) paved oval motor racing track in Newton, Iowa, United States, approximately 30 miles (48 km) east of Des Moines. The track was designed with influence from Rusty Wallace and patterned after Richmond Raceway, a short track where Wallace was very successful. It has over 25,000 permanent seats as well as a unique multi-tiered Recreational Vehicle viewing area along the backstretch.

== Entry list ==
No.	Driver	Team	Manufacturer
00	Cole Custer	Stewart-Haas Racing with Biagi-DenBeste Racing	Ford
0	Garrett Smithley	JD Motorsports	Chevrolet
01	Ryan Repko	JD Motorsports	Chevrolet
1	Michael Annett	JR Motorsports	Chevrolet
2	Tyler Reddick	Richard Childress Racing	Chevrolet
4	Stephen Leicht	JD Motorsports	Chevrolet
5	Matt Mills (R)	B. J. McLeod Motorsports	Chevrolet
07	Ray Black Jr.	SS-Green Light Racing	Chevrolet
7	Justin Allgaier	JR Motorsports	Chevrolet
08	Gray Gaulding (R)	SS-Green Light Racing	Chevrolet
8	Zane Smith	JR Motorsports	Chevrolet
9	Noah Gragson (R)	JR Motorsports	Chevrolet
11	Justin Haley (R)	Kaulig Racing	Chevrolet
13	Timmy Hill	MBM Motorsports	Toyota
15	Tyler Matthews	JD Motorsports	Chevrolet
18	Harrison Burton (i)	Joe Gibbs Racing	Toyota
19	Brandon Jones	Joe Gibbs Racing	Toyota
20	Christopher Bell	Joe Gibbs Racing	Toyota
21	Joe Graf Jr.	Richard Childress Racing	Chevrolet
22	Austin Cindric	Team Penske	Ford
23	John Hunter Nemechek (R)	GMS Racing	Chevrolet
28	Shane Lee	H2 Motorsports	Toyota
35	Joey Gase	MBM Motorsports	Toyota
36	Josh Williams	DGM Racing	Chevrolet
38	Jeff Green	RSS Racing	Chevrolet
39	Ryan Sieg	RSS Racing	Chevrolet
42	Chad Finchum	MBM Motorsports	Toyota
51	Jeremy Clements	Jeremy Clements Racing	Chevrolet
52	David Starr	Jimmy Means Racing	Chevrolet
66	Stan Mullis	MBM Motorsports	Toyota
74	Mike Harmon	Mike Harmon Racing	Chevrolet
78	Vinnie Miller	B. J. McLeod Motorsports	Chevrolet
86	Brandon Brown	Brandonbilt Motorsports	Chevrolet
89	Morgan Shepherd	Shepherd Racing Ventures	Chevrolet
90	Ronnie Bassett Jr.	DGM Racing	Chevrolet
93	Josh Bilicki	RSS Racing	Chevrolet
98	Chase Briscoe (R)	Stewart-Haas Racing with Biagi-DenBeste Racing	Ford
99	Ryan Ellis	B. J. McLeod Motorsports	Toyota

== Practice ==
Harrison Burton was the fastest in the practice session with a time of 24.195 seconds and a speed of 130.192 mph (209.524 km/h).

Pos	No.	Driver	Team	Manufacturer	Time	Speed
1	18	Harrison Burton (i)	Joe Gibbs Racing	Toyota	24.195	130.192
2	20	Christopher Bell	Joe Gibbs Racing	Toyota	24.210	130.112
3	22	Austin Cindric	Team Penske	Ford	24.219	130.063

== Qualifying ==
Cole Custer scored the pole for the race with a time of 23.779 seconds and a speed of 132.470 mph (213.190 km/h).

=== Qualifying results ===
Pos	No	Driver	Team	Manufacturer	Time
1	00	Cole Custer	Stewart-Haas Racing with Biagi-DenBeste Racing	Ford	23.779
2	20	Christopher Bell	Joe Gibbs Racing	Toyota	23.807
3	8	Zane Smith	JR Motorsports	Chevrolet	23.808
4	9	Noah Gragson (R)	JR Motorsports	Chevrolet	23.937
5	2	Tyler Reddick	Richard Childress Racing	Chevrolet	23.964
6	23	John Hunter Nemechek (R)	GMS Racing	Chevrolet	23.992
7	22	Austin Cindric	Team Penske	Ford	23.997
8	11	Justin Haley (R)	Kaulig Racing	Chevrolet	24.086
9	98	Chase Briscoe (R)	Stewart-Haas Racing with Biagi-DenBeste Racing	Ford	24.091
10	18	Harrison Burton (i)	Joe Gibbs Racing	Toyota	24.095
11	19	Brandon Jones	Joe Gibbs Racing	Toyota	24.107
12	1	Michael Annett	JR Motorsports	Chevrolet	24.150
13	51	Jeremy Clements	Jeremy Clements Racing	Chevrolet	24.181
14	7	Justin Allgaier	JR Motorsports	Chevrolet	24.194
15	86	Brandon Brown	Brandonbilt Motorsports	Chevrolet	24.286
16	39	Ryan Sieg	RSS Racing	Chevrolet	24.334
17	28	Shane Lee	H2 Motorsports	Toyota	24.417
18	08	Gray Gaulding (R)	SS-Green Light Racing	Chevrolet	24.457
19	07	Ray Black Jr.	SS-Green Light Racing	Chevrolet	24.496
20	42	Chad Finchum	MBM Motorsports	Toyota	24.508
21	21	Joe Graf Jr.	Richard Childress Racing	Chevrolet	24.528
22	4	Stephen Leicht	JD Motorsports	Chevrolet	24.537
23	36	Josh Williams	DGM Racing	Chevrolet	24.538
24	52	David Starr	Jimmy Means Racing	Chevrolet	24.614
25	0	Garrett Smithley	JD Motorsports	Chevrolet	24.617
26	5	Matt Mills (R)	B. J. McLeod Motorsports	Chevrolet	24.623
27	90	Ronnie Bassett Jr.	DGM Racing	Chevrolet	24.646
28	99	Ryan Ellis	B. J. McLeod Motorsports	Toyota	24.655
29	89	Morgan Shepherd	Shepherd Racing Ventures	Chevrolet	24.665
30	35	Joey Gase	MBM Motorsports	Toyota	24.678
31	78	Vinnie Miller	B. J. McLeod Motorsports	Chevrolet	24.743
32	01	Ryan Repko	JD Motorsports	Chevrolet	24.757
33	15	Tyler Matthews	JD Motorsports	Chevrolet	24.921
34	74	Mike Harmon	Mike Harmon Racing	Chevrolet	25.120
35	38	Jeff Green	RSS Racing	Chevrolet	25.147
36	93	Josh Bilicki	RSS Racing	Chevrolet	25.203
37	66	Stan Mullis	MBM Motorsports	Toyota	25.327
38	13	Timmy Hill	MBM Motorsports	Toyota	25.358

== Race ==
=== Summary ===
Cole Custer began on pole. He remained on the outside lane and pulled away. On lap 30, David Starr lost a motor and brought out the caution. On the restart, Custer got ahead on the top, with Christopher Bell contesting him on the bottom. Custer held the lead as Justin Allgaier chased after them.

Joey Gase and Vinnie Miller tangled on lap 48, wrecking their cars and bringing out the caution. Custer wins the race off pit road. Justin Haley took the lead as Custer and Bell quickly caught up to him. Bell used a sidedraft and slid in front of Custer to win Stage 1.

Custer and Bell continue their fight for the lead, with Allgaier behind them. With three laps remaining in stage 2, Austin Cindric and Allgaier made contact. Cindric thought he was clear, Allgaier still had a fender on him on the outside. Bell won Stage 2. He also built up a strong lead afterwards, staying in the lead after a caution caused by Tyler Matthews.

On the next restart, Bell gets ahead of Custer, who in turn blocked Allgaier from passing. With 35 laps remaining, Custer got into the wall with no damage, bringing out the caution. He manages to get off pit road first. With 27 laps remaining, Custer got loose, prompting Bell to go to the bottom. Bell makes contact while trying to side draft, but he leads into the next turn. With 16 laps remaining, Chad Finchum brought out the caution after slamming into the wall.

On the restart, Custer went to the bottom, but Bell got ahead on the top. Custer pulled next to him off the next turn, but Bell drove away and took the win for the race.

=== Stage Results ===
Stage One Laps: 60

Pos	No	Driver	Team	Manufacturer	Points
1	20	Christopher Bell	Joe Gibbs Racing	Toyota	10
2	00	Cole Custer	Stewart-Haas Racing with Biagi-DenBeste	Ford	9
3	7	Justin Allgaier	JR Motorsports	Chevrolet	8
4	9	Noah Gragson (R)	JR Motorsports	Chevrolet	7
5	18	Harrison Burton (i)	Joe Gibbs Racing	Toyota	0
6	8	Zane Smith	JR Motorsports	Chevrolet	5
7	11	Justin Haley (R)	Kaulig Racing	Chevrolet	4
8	23	John Hunter Nemechek (R)	GMS Racing	Chevrolet	3
9	22	Austin Cindric	Team Penske	Ford	2
10	1	Michael Annett	JR Motorsports	Chevrolet	1

Stage Two Laps: 60

Pos	No	Driver	Team	Manufacturer	Points
1	20	Christopher Bell	Joe Gibbs Racing	Toyota	10
2	00	Cole Custer	Stewart-Haas Racing with Biagi-DenBeste	Ford	9
3	18	Harrison Burton (i)	Joe Gibbs Racing	Toyota	0
4	22	Austin Cindric	Team Penske	Ford	7
5	7	Justin Allgaier	JR Motorsports	Chevrolet	6
6	8	Zane Smith	JR Motorsports	Chevrolet	5
7	1	Michael Annett	JR Motorsports	Chevrolet	4
8	19	Brandon Jones	Joe Gibbs Racing	Toyota	3
9	23	John Hunter Nemechek (R)	GMS Racing	Chevrolet	2
10	11	Justin Haley (R)	Kaulig Racing	Chevrolet	1

=== Final Stage Results ===
Stage Three Laps: 130

Pos	Grid	No	Driver	Team	Manufacturer	Laps	Points
1	2	20	Christopher Bell	Joe Gibbs Racing	Toyota	250	60
2	1	00	Cole Custer	Stewart-Haas Racing with Biagi-DenBeste	Ford	250	53
3	14	7	Justin Allgaier	JR Motorsports	Chevrolet	250	48
4	10	18	Harrison Burton (i)	Joe Gibbs Racing	Toyota	250	0
5	3	8	Zane Smith	JR Motorsports	Chevrolet	250	42
6	4	9	Noah Gragson (R)	JR Motorsports	Chevrolet	250	38
7	9	98	Chase Briscoe (R)	Stewart-Haas Racing with Biagi-DenBeste	Ford	250	30
8	6	23	John Hunter Nemechek (R)	GMS Racing	Chevrolet	250	34
9	12	1	Michael Annett	JR Motorsports	Chevrolet	250	33
10	7	22	Austin Cindric	Team Penske	Ford	250	36
11	11	19	Brandon Jones	Joe Gibbs Racing	Toyota	250	29
12	13	51	Jeremy Clements	Jeremy Clements Racing	Chevrolet	250	25
13	8	11	Justin Haley (R)	Kaulig Racing	Chevrolet	250	29
14	18	08	Gray Gaulding	SS-Green Light Racing	Chevrolet	250	23
15	5	2	Tyler Reddick	Richard Childress Racing	Chevrolet	249	22
16	19	07	Ray Black Jr.	SS-Green Light Racing	Chevrolet	249	21
17	23	36	Josh Williams (R)	DGM Racing	Chevrolet	249	20
18	17	28	Shane Lee	H2 Motorsports	Toyota	248	19
19	21	21	Joe Graf Jr.	Richard Childress Racing	Chevrolet	247	18
20	33	15	Tyler Matthews	JD Motorsports	Chevrolet	247	17
21	20	42	Chad Finchum	MBM Motorsports	Toyota	246	16
22	32	01	Ryan Repko	JD Motorsports	Chevrolet	245	15
23	28	99	Ryan Ellis	B. J. McLeod Motorsports	Chevrolet	244	14
24	27	90	Ronnie Bassett Jr.	DGM Racing	Chevrolet	244	13
25	22	4	Stephen Leicht (R)	JD Motorsports	Chevrolet	204	12
26	26	5	Matt Mills (R)	B. J. McLeod Motorsports	Chevrolet	123	11
27	34	74	Mike Harmon	Mike Harmon Racing	Chevrolet	120	10
28	37	66	Stan Mullis	MBM Motorsports	Toyota	109	9
29	25	0	Garrett Smithley	JD Motorsports	Chevrolet	106	8
30	16	39	Ryan Sieg	RSS Racing	Chevrolet	78	7
31	15	86	Brandon Brown	Brandonbilt Motorsports	Chevrolet	76	6
32	31	78	Vinnie Miller	B. J. McLeod Motorsports	Chevrolet	48	5
33	30	35	Joey Gase	MBM Motorsports	Toyota	46	4
34	24	52	David Starr	Jimmy Means Racing	Chevrolet	30	3
35	29	89	Morgan Shepherd	Shepherd Racing Ventures	Chevrolet	23	2
36	38	13	Timmy Hill	MBM Motorsports	Toyota	21	1
37	35	38	Jeff Green	RSS Racing	Chevrolet	16	1
38	36	93	Josh Bilicki	RSS Racing	Chevrolet	10	1

Previous race: 2019 LTi Printing 250	NASCAR Xfinity Series; 2019 season	Next race: 2019 Camping World 300
