= 2019 Camping World 300 =

Race details
- Race 15 of 33 in the 2019 NASCAR Xfinity Series season
- Date: June 29, 2019
- Location: Chicagoland Speedway in Joliet, Illinois
- Course: Permanent racing facility
- Course length: 1.5 miles (2.414 km)
- Distance: 200 laps, 300 mi (482.803 km)

Pole position
Driver	Joey Logano	Team Penske
- Time: 30.413

Most laps led
Driver	Cole Custer	Stewart-Haas Racing with Biagi-DenBeste Racing
- Laps: 151

Winner
No. 00	Cole Custer	Stewart-Haas Racing with Biagi-DenBeste Racing

Television in the United States
- Network: NBCSN

Radio in the United States
- Radio: MRN

The 2019 Camping World 300 is a NASCAR Xfinity Series race held on June 29, 2019, at Chicagoland Speedway in Joliet, Illinois. Contested over 200 laps on the 1.5-mile (2.4 km) intermediate speedway, it was the 15th race of the 2019 NASCAR Xfinity Series season.

== Background ==
=== Track ===
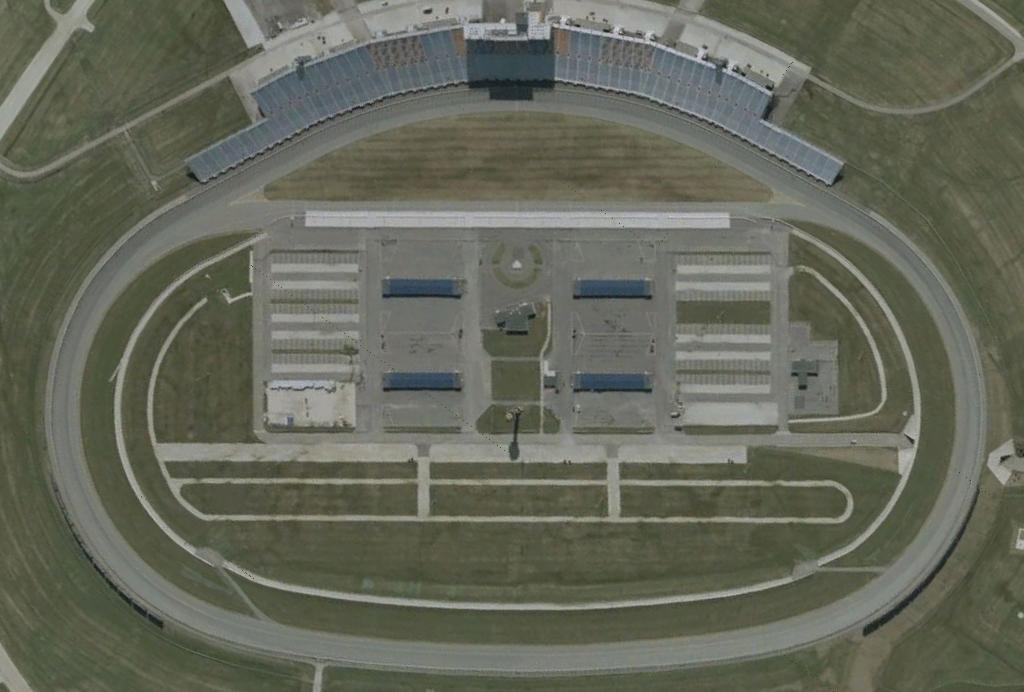
Chicagoland Speedway, the track where the race was held.

Chicagoland Speedway is a 1.5 miles (2.4 km) tri-oval speedway in Joliet, Illinois, southwest of Chicago. The speedway opened in 2001 and currently hosts NASCAR races. Until 2011, the speedway also hosted the IndyCar Series, recording numerous close finishes, including the closest finish in IndyCar history. The speedway is owned and operated by International Speedway Corporation and is located adjacent to Route 66 Raceway.

== Entry list ==
No.	Driver	Team	Manufacturer	Sponsor
00	Cole Custer	Stewart-Haas Racing with Biagi-DenBeste Racing	Ford	Haas Automation
0	Garrett Smithley	JD Motorsports	Chevrolet	JD Motorsports
01	Stephen Leicht	JD Motorsports	Chevrolet	Gerber Collision & Glass
1	Michael Annett	JR Motorsports	Chevrolet	Pilot, Flying J
2	Tyler Reddick	Richard Childress Racing	Chevrolet	KC Motorgroup
4	Landon Cassill	JD Motorsports	Chevrolet	JD Motorsports
5	Matt Mills (R)	B. J. McLeod Motorsports	Chevrolet	J.F. Electric
07	Ray Black Jr.	SS-Green Light Racing	Chevrolet	Isokern Fireplaces & Chimmeys
7	Justin Allgaier	JR Motorsports	Chevrolet	Brandt Agricultural
08	Gray Gaulding (R)	SS-Green Light Racing	Chevrolet	ABA of Illinois, LLC, Worldwide Safety Counseling
8	Zane Smith	JR Motorsports	Chevrolet	Canadamark Diamond, BN3TH
9	Noah Gragson (R)	JR Motorsports	Chevrolet	Switch, MagnaFlow
10	Ross Chastain (i)	Kaulig Racing	Chevrolet	Nutrien Ag Solutions
11	Justin Haley (R)	Kaulig Racing	Chevrolet	Leaf Filter Gutter Protection
12	Joey Logano (i)	Team Penske	Ford	Snap-on
13	Joe Nemechek (i)	MBM Motorsports	Toyota	CrashClaimsR.Us
15	B. J. McLeod	JD Motorsports	Chevrolet	JD Motorsports
17	Bayley Currey (i)	Rick Ware Racing	Chevrolet	Rick Ware Racing
18	Riley Herbst (i)	Joe Gibbs Racing	Toyota	Monster Energy
19	Brandon Jones	Joe Gibbs Racing	Toyota	Menards, Bali Blinds
20	Christopher Bell	Joe Gibbs Racing	Toyota	Rheem
22	Austin Cindric	Team Penske	Ford	Discount Tire
23	John Hunter Nemechek (R)	GMS Racing	Chevrolet	GMS Racing
28	Shane Lee	H2 Motorsports	Toyota	Titan Mining Rigs
35	Joey Gase	MBM Motorsports	Toyota	CrashClaimsR.Us, Gift of Hope Organ & Tissue Donor Network
36	Josh Williams	DGM Racing	Chevrolet	General Formulations
38	Jeff Green	RSS Racing	Chevrolet	RSS Racing
39	Ryan Sieg	RSS Racing	Chevrolet	Big Green Egg
42	Chad Finchum	MBM Motorsports	Toyota	NLB Heating & Cooling, Ryan's Collision Service
51	Jeremy Clements	Jeremy Clements Racing	Chevrolet	RepairableVehicles.com
52	David Starr	Jimmy Means Racing	Chevrolet	Dealer Associates, Flurry
66	Timmy Hill	MBM Motorsports	Toyota	OCR Gaz Bar
74	Camden Murphy (i)	Mike Harmon Racing	Chevrolet	RonaldHouseChicago.org
78	Vinnie Miller	B. J. McLeod Motorsports	Chevrolet	JW Transport, LLC
81	Jeffrey Earnhardt	XCI Racing	Toyota	Comcast NBC Universal Salute to Service
86	Brandon Brown	Brandonbilt Motorsports	Chevrolet	ABS Vans, BMSRaceTeam.com
89	Morgan Shepherd	Shepherd Racing Ventures	Chevrolet	Racing With Jesus, Visone RV
90	Ronnie Bassett Jr.	DGM Racing	Chevrolet	Bassett Gutters & More Inc.
93	Josh Bilicki	RSS Racing	Chevrolet	Insurance King
98	Chase Briscoe (R)	Stewart-Haas Racing with Biagi-DenBeste Racing	Ford	Ford Performance
99	Tommy Joe Martins	B. J. McLeod Motorsports	Toyota	Diamond Gusset Jeans, The Podgoats

== Practice ==
=== First practice ===
Tyler Reddick was the fastest in the first practice session with a time of 30.872 seconds and a speed of 174.916 mph (281.500 km/h).

Pos	No.	Driver	Team	Manufacturer	Time	Speed
1	2	Tyler Reddick	Richard Childress Racing	Chevrolet	30.872	174.916
2	00	Cole Custer	Stewart-Haas Racing with Biagi-DenBeste Racing	Ford	31.181	173.182
3	20	Christopher Bell	Joe Gibbs Racing	Toyota	31.206	173.044

=== Final practice ===
Joey Logano was the fastest in the final practice session with a time of 30.936 seconds and a speed of 174.554 mph (280.917 km/h).

Pos	No.	Driver	Team	Manufacturer	Time	Speed
1	12	Joey Logano (i)	Team Penske	Ford	30.936	174.554
2	2	Tyler Reddick	Richard Childress Racing	Chevrolet	31.053	173.896
3	00	Cole Custer	Stewart-Haas Racing with Biagi-DenBeste Racing	Ford	31.056	173.879

== Qualifying ==
Joey Logano scored the pole for the race with a time of 30.413 seconds and a speed of 177.556 mph (285.749 km/h).

=== Qualifying results ===
Pos	No	Driver	Team	Manufacturer	Time
1	12	Joey Logano (i)	Team Penske	Ford	30.413
2	00	Cole Custer	Stewart-Haas Racing with Biagi-DenBeste Racing	Ford	30.424
3	10	Ross Chastain (i)	Kaulig Racing	Chevrolet	30.555
4	7	Justin Allgaier	JR Motorsports	Chevrolet	30.586
5	20	Christopher Bell	Joe Gibbs Racing	Toyota	30.607
6	19	Brandon Jones	Joe Gibbs Racing	Toyota	30.615
7	22	Austin Cindric	Team Penske	Ford	30.626
8	18	Riley Herbst (i)	Joe Gibbs Racing	Toyota	30.647
9	2	Tyler Reddick	Richard Childress Racing	Chevrolet	30.691
10	9	Noah Gragson (R)	JR Motorsports	Chevrolet	30.693
11	98	Chase Briscoe (R)	Stewart-Haas Racing with Biagi-DenBeste Racing	Ford	30.814
12	39	Ryan Sieg	RSS Racing	Chevrolet	30.852
13	8	Zane Smith	JR Motorsports	Chevrolet	30.859
14	11	Justin Haley (R)	Kaulig Racing	Chevrolet	30.865
15	23	John Hunter Nemechek (R)	GMS Racing	Chevrolet	30.974
16	1	Michael Annett	JR Motorsports	Chevrolet	31.047
17	08	Gray Gaulding (R)	SS-Green Light Racing	Chevrolet	31.096
18	15	B. J. McLeod	JD Motorsports	Chevrolet	31.158
19	51	Jeremy Clements	Jeremy Clements Racing	Chevrolet	31.167
20	4	Landon Cassill	JD Motorsports	Chevrolet	31.173
21	81	Jeffrey Earnhardt	XCI Racing	Toyota	31.219
22	28	Shane Lee	H2 Motorsports	Toyota	31.256
23	17	Bayley Currey (i)	Rick Ware Racing	Chevrolet	31.290
24	5	Matt Mills (R)	B. J. McLeod Motorsports	Chevrolet	31.396
25	07	Ray Black Jr.	SS-Green Light Racing	Chevrolet	31.464
26	42	Chad Finchum	MBM Motorsports	Toyota	31.517
27	35	Joey Gase	MBM Motorsports	Toyota	31.530
28	99	Tommy Joe Martins	B. J. McLeod Motorsports	Toyota	31.536
29	74	Camden Murphy (i)	Mike Harmon Racing	Chevrolet	31.636
30	01	Stephen Leicht	JD Motorsports	Chevrolet	31.637
31	86	Brandon Brown	Brandonbilt Motorsports	Chevrolet	31.646
32	66	Timmy Hill	MBM Motorsports	Toyota	31.659
33	90	Ronnie Bassett Jr.	DGM Racing	Chevrolet	31.668
34	36	Josh Williams	DGM Racing	Chevrolet	31.888
35	0	Garrett Smithley	JD Motorsports	Chevrolet	32.091
36	52	David Starr	Jimmy Means Racing	Chevrolet	32.205
37	78	Vinnie Miller	B. J. McLeod Motorsports	Chevrolet	32.298
38	38	Jeff Green	RSS Racing	Chevrolet	32.440
Did not qualify
39	93	Josh Bilicki	RSS Racing	Chevrolet	31.898
40	13	Joe Nemechek (i)	MBM Motorsports	Toyota	31.997
41	89	Morgan Shepherd	Shepherd Racing Ventures	Chevrolet	32.795

- Josh Bilicki failed to qualify his No. 93 RSS Racing Chevrolet but drove the No. 17 Rick Ware Racing Chevrolet in the race since Bayley Currey (who qualified the car) got ill.

== Race ==
=== Summary ===
Joey Logano began on pole. Cole Custer passed him after 3 laps. The first caution was thrown for Justin Allgaier spinning out on lap 13. Allgaier would later crash into the wall in the second half of the race, ending his day early. Custer and Logano continued to battle for the lead, with Custer winning the first stage. He would maintain the lead until Logano regained it on lap 80. A caution was thrown after Ryan Sieg spun out due to a flat tire, and Custer opted to pit, while Logano did not get tires and won the second stage.

Custer retook the lead on lap 116, dominating for the next run. He gave up the lead on lap 154 after taking a green-flag pit stop. Michael Annett and Noah Gragson decided to stay out and stretch their fuel run. B. J. McLeod made contact with the wall later, bringing out the final caution. Ross Chastain was able to return to the lead lap. The final green flag run lasted 21 laps. Custer jumped out to the lead and won the race with a 3-second lead over Logano.

=== Stage Results ===
Stage One Laps: 45

Pos	No	Driver	Team	Manufacturer	Points
1	00	Cole Custer	Stewart-Haas Racing with Biagi-DenBeste	Ford	10
2	2	Tyler Reddick	Richard Childress Racing	Chevrolet	9
3	20	Christopher Bell	Joe Gibbs Racing	Toyota	8
4	19	Brandon Jones	Joe Gibbs Racing	Toyota	7
5	12	Joey Logano (i)	Team Penske	Ford	0
6	7	Justin Allgaier	JR Motorsports	Chevrolet	5
7	22	Austin Cindric	Team Penske	Ford	4
8	1	Michael Annett	JR Motorsports	Chevrolet	3
9	98	Chase Briscoe (R)	Stewart-Haas Racing with Biagi-DenBeste	Ford	2
10	10	Ross Chastain (i)	Kaulig Racing	Chevrolet	0

Stage Two Laps: 45

Pos	No	Driver	Team	Manufacturer	Points
1	12	Joey Logano (i)	Team Penske	Ford	0
2	20	Christopher Bell	Joe Gibbs Racing	Toyota	9
3	00	Cole Custer	Stewart-Haas Racing with Biagi-DenBeste	Ford	8
4	19	Brandon Jones	Joe Gibbs Racing	Toyota	7
5	2	Tyler Reddick	Richard Childress Racing	Chevrolet	6
6	8	Zane Smith	JR Motorsports	Chevrolet	5
7	22	Austin Cindric	Team Penske	Ford	4
8	11	Justin Haley (R)	Kaulig Racing	Chevrolet	3
9	7	Justin Allgaier	JR Motorsports	Chevrolet	2
10	10	Ross Chastain (i)	Kaulig Racing	Chevrolet	0

=== Final Stage Results ===
Stage Three Laps: 110

Pos	Grid	No	Driver	Team	Manufacturer	Laps	Points
1	2	00	Cole Custer	Stewart-Haas Racing with Biagi-DenBeste	Ford	200	58
2	1	12	Joey Logano (i)	Team Penske	Ford	200	0
3	16	1	Michael Annett	JR Motorsports	Chevrolet	200	39
4	6	19	Brandon Jones	Joe Gibbs Racing	Toyota	200	49
5	7	22	Austin Cindric	Team Penske	Ford	200	42
6	10	9	Noah Gragson (R)	JR Motorsports	Chevrolet	200	31
7	14	11	Justin Haley (R)	Kaulig Racing	Chevrolet	200	34
8	3	10	Ross Chastain (i)	Kaulig Racing	Chevrolet	200	0
9	9	2	Tyler Reddick	Richard Childress Racing	Chevrolet	200	44
10	8	18	Riley Herbst (i)	Joe Gibbs Racing	Toyota	200	0
11	15	23	John Hunter Nemechek (R)	GMS Racing	Chevrolet	200	26
12	12	39	Ryan Sieg	RSS Racing	Chevrolet	200	25
13	19	51	Jeremy Clements	Jeremy Clements Racing	Chevrolet	200	24
14	17	08	Gray Gaulding	SS-Green Light Racing	Chevrolet	200	23
15	11	98	Chase Briscoe (R)	Stewart-Haas Racing with Biagi-DenBeste	Ford	199	25
16	21	81	Jeffrey Earnhardt	XCI Racing	Toyota	199	21
17	13	8	Zane Smith	JR Motorsports	Chevrolet	199	26
18	22	28	Shane Lee	H2 Motorsports	Toyota	199	19
19	20	4	Landon Cassill	JD Motorsports	Chevrolet	199	18
20	25	07	Ray Black Jr.	SS-Green Light Racing	Chevrolet	199	17
21	30	01	Stephen Leicht (R)	JD Motorsports	Chevrolet	199	16
22	31	86	Brandon Brown	Brandonbilt Motorsports	Chevrolet	198	15
23	18	15	B. J. McLeod	JD Motorsports	Chevrolet	196	14
24	26	42	Chad Finchum	MBM Motorsports	Toyota	195	13
25	35	0	Garrett Smithley	JD Motorsports	Chevrolet	195	12
26	34	36	Josh Williams (R)	DGM Racing	Chevrolet	195	11
27	24	5	Matt Mills (R)	B. J. McLeod Motorsports	Chevrolet	195	10
28	28	99	Tommy Joe Martins	B. J. McLeod Motorsports	Chevrolet	194	9
29	37	78	Vinnie Miller	B. J. McLeod Motorsports	Chevrolet	194	8
30	33	90	Ronnie Bassett Jr.	DGM Racing	Chevrolet	193	7
31	29	74	Camden Murphy (i)	Mike Harmon Racing	Chevrolet	192	0
32	4	7	Justin Allgaier	JR Motorsports	Chevrolet	127	14
33	27	35	Joey Gase	MBM Motorsports	Toyota	111	4
34	32	66	Timmy Hill	MBM Motorsports	Toyota	71	3
35	23	17	Josh Bilicki	Rick Ware Racing	Chevrolet	55	2
36	36	52	David Starr	Jimmy Means Racing	Chevrolet	52	1
37	38	38	Jeff Green	RSS Racing	Chevrolet	11	1
38	5	20	Christopher Bell	Joe Gibbs Racing	Toyota	200	1

== After the race ==
Christopher Bell's car failed post-race inspection, disqualifying him from his third-place finish. He was credited as finishing last, also losing his 17-stage points. For the inspection, NASCAR had the team take the shocks off the car so it can be compared to pre-race inspection. The front of Bell's car was "extremely low" and the rear was slightly higher. Bell's disqualification is the second one to occur under 2019's inspection format, following Chastain's disqualification in the truck series at Iowa in mid-June and is the first Xfinity disqualification since 1995.

Previous race: 2019 CircuitCity.com 250	NASCAR Xfinity Series; 2019 season	Next race: 2019 Circle K Firecracker 250
