= 2019 U.S. Cellular 250 =

Race details
- Race 19 of 33 in the 2019 NASCAR Xfinity Series season
- Date: July 27, 2019
- Location: Iowa Speedway in Newton, Iowa
- Course: Permanent racing facility
- Course length: 0.875 miles (1.408 km)
- Distance: 250 laps, 218.75 mi (352.044 km)

Pole position
Driver	Christopher Bell	Joe Gibbs Racing
- Time: 23.710

Most laps led
Driver	Christopher Bell	Joe Gibbs Racing
- Laps: 234

Winner
No. 98	Chase Briscoe	Stewart-Haas Racing with Biagi-DenBeste Racing

Television in the United States
- Network: NBCSN

Radio in the United States
- Radio: MRN

The 2019 U.S. Cellular 250 is a NASCAR Xfinity Series race held on July 27, 2019, at Iowa Speedway in Newton, Iowa. Contested over 250 laps on the 0.875-mile (1.408 km) D-shaped oval, it was the 19th race of the 2019 NASCAR Xfinity Series season.

== Background ==
=== Track ===
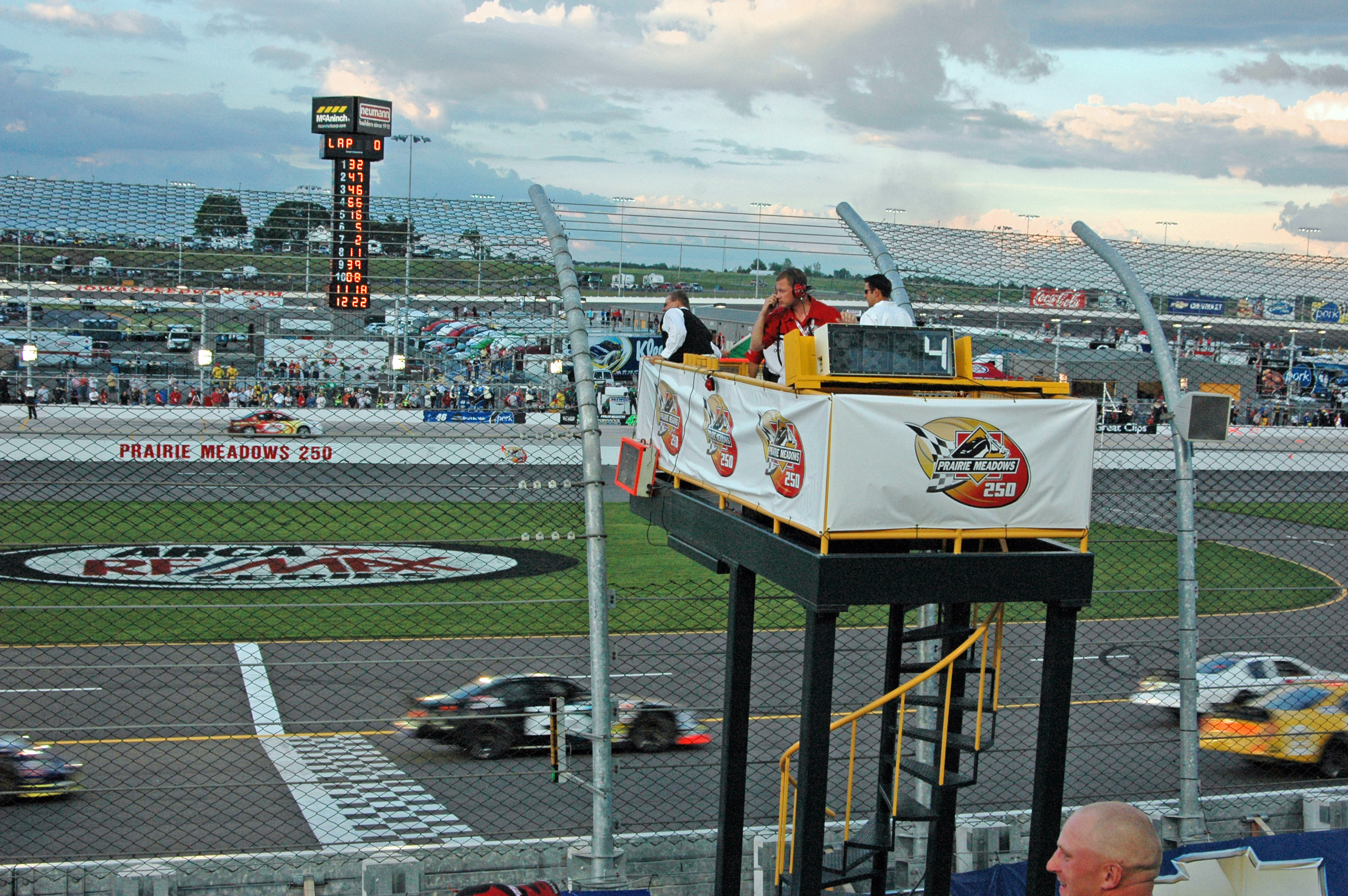
Flagstand of Iowa Speedway in June 2007, the track where the race was held.

Iowa Speedway is a 7/8-mile (1.4 km) paved oval motor racing track in Newton, Iowa, United States, approximately 30 miles (48 km) east of Des Moines. The track was designed with influence from Rusty Wallace and patterned after Richmond Raceway, a short track where Wallace was very successful. It has over 25,000 permanent seats as well as a unique multi-tiered Recreational Vehicle viewing area along the backstretch.

== Entry list ==
No.	Driver	Team	Manufacturer
00	Cole Custer	Stewart-Haas Racing with Biagi-DenBeste Racing	Ford
0	Garrett Smithley	JD Motorsports	Chevrolet
01	Ryan Repko	JD Motorsports	Chevrolet
1	Michael Annett	JR Motorsports	Chevrolet
2	Tyler Reddick	Richard Childress Racing	Chevrolet
4	Stephen Leicht	JD Motorsports	Chevrolet
5	Matt Mills	B. J. McLeod Motorsports	Chevrolet
07	Ray Black Jr.	SS-Green Light Racing	Chevrolet
7	Justin Allgaier	JR Motorsports	Chevrolet
08	Gray Gaulding (R)	SS-Green Light Racing	Chevrolet
8	Zane Smith	JR Motorsports	Chevrolet
9	Noah Gragson (R)	JR Motorsports	Chevrolet
11	Justin Haley (R)	Kaulig Racing	Chevrolet
13	Timmy Hill	MBM Motorsports	Toyota
15	Ryan Vargas	JD Motorsports	Chevrolet
17	Mark Meunier	Rick Ware Racing	Chevrolet
18	Riley Herbst (i)	Joe Gibbs Racing	Toyota
19	Brandon Jones	Joe Gibbs Racing	Toyota
20	Christopher Bell	Joe Gibbs Racing	Toyota
22	Austin Cindric	Team Penske	Ford
23	John Hunter Nemechek (R)	GMS Racing	Chevrolet
28	Shane Lee	H2 Motorsports	Toyota
35	Joey Gase	MBM Motorsports	Toyota
36	Josh Williams	DGM Racing	Chevrolet
38	J. J. Yeley (i)	RSS Racing	Chevrolet
39	Ryan Sieg	RSS Racing	Chevrolet
42	Chad Finchum	MBM Motorsports	Toyota
51	Jeremy Clements	Jeremy Clements Racing	Chevrolet
52	David Starr	Jimmy Means Racing	Chevrolet
66	Stan Mullis	MBM Motorsports	Toyota
68	Will Rodgers	Brandonbilt Motorsports	Chevrolet
74	Mike Harmon	Mike Harmon Racing	Chevrolet
78	Vinnie Miller	B. J. McLeod Motorsports	Chevrolet
86	Brandon Brown	Brandonbilt Motorsports	Chevrolet
89	Morgan Shepherd	Shepherd Racing Ventures	Chevrolet
90	Dillon Bassett	DGM Racing	Chevrolet
93	Camden Murphy (i)	RSS Racing	Chevrolet
98	Chase Briscoe (R)	Stewart-Haas Racing with Biagi-DenBeste Racing	Ford
99	Stefan Parsons	B. J. McLeod Motorsports (R)	Toyota

== Practice ==
=== First practice ===
Christopher Bell was the fastest in the first practice session with a time of 24.297 seconds and a speed of 129.646 mph (208.645 km/h).

Pos	No.	Driver	Team	Manufacturer	Time	Speed
1	20	Christopher Bell	Joe Gibbs Racing	Toyota	24.297	129.646
2	2	Tyler Reddick	Richard Childress Racing	Chevrolet	24.377	129.220
3	28	Shane Lee (R)	H2 Motorsports	Toyota	24.400	129.098

=== Final practice ===
Cole Custer was the fastest in the final practice session with a time of 24.236 seconds and a speed of 129.972 mph (209.170 km/h).

Pos	No.	Driver	Team	Manufacturer	Time	Speed
1	00	Cole Custer	Stewart-Haas Racing with Biagi-DenBeste Racing	Ford	24.236	129.972
2	2	Tyler Reddick	Richard Childress Racing	Chevrolet	24.262	129.833
3	20	Christopher Bell	Joe Gibbs Racing	Toyota	24.280	129.736

== Qualifying ==
Christopher Bell scored the pole for the race with a time of 23.710 seconds and a speed of 132.855 mph (213.809 km/h).

=== Qualifying results ===
Pos	No	Driver	Team	Manufacturer	Time
1	20	Christopher Bell	Joe Gibbs Racing	Toyota	23.710
2	98	Chase Briscoe (R)	Stewart-Haas Racing with Biagi-DenBeste Racing	Ford	23.742
3	19	Brandon Jones	Joe Gibbs Racing	Toyota	23.785
4	18	Riley Herbst (i)	Joe Gibbs Racing	Toyota	23.823
5	7	Justin Allgaier	JR Motorsports	Chevrolet	23.859
6	00	Cole Custer	Stewart-Haas Racing with Biagi-DenBeste Racing	Ford	23.865
7	28	Shane Lee (R)	H2 Motorsports	Toyota	23.876
8	22	Austin Cindric	Team Penske	Ford	23.891
9	1	Michael Annett	JR Motorsports	Chevrolet	23.915
10	39	Ryan Sieg	RSS Racing	Chevrolet	23.941
11	2	Tyler Reddick	Richard Childress Racing	Chevrolet	23.945
12	8	Zane Smith	JR Motorsports	Chevrolet	23.989
13	9	Noah Gragson (R)	JR Motorsports	Chevrolet	24.040
14	23	John Hunter Nemechek (R)	GMS Racing	Chevrolet	24.069
15	11	Justin Haley (R)	Kaulig Racing	Chevrolet	24.096
16	51	Jeremy Clements	Jeremy Clements Racing	Chevrolet	24.150
17	90	Dillon Bassett	DGM Racing	Chevrolet	24.183
18	38	J. J. Yeley (i)	RSS Racing	Chevrolet	24.197
19	08	Gray Gaulding (R)	SS-Green Light Racing	Chevrolet	24.215
20	86	Brandon Brown	Brandonbilt Motorsports	Chevrolet	24.328
21	68	Will Rodgers	Brandonbilt Motorsports	Chevrolet	24.412
22	42	Chad Finchum	MBM Motorsports	Toyota	24.448
23	15	Ryan Vargas	JD Motorsports	Chevrolet	24.510
24	07	Ray Black Jr.	SS-Green Light Racing	Chevrolet	24.561
25	4	Stephen Leicht	JD Motorsports	Chevrolet	24.569
26	35	Joey Gase	MBM Motorsports	Toyota	24.576
27	93	Camden Murphy (i)	RSS Racing	Chevrolet	24.579
28	99	Stefan Parsons	B. J. McLeod Motorsports	Toyota	24.580
29	36	Josh Williams	DGM Racing	Chevrolet	24.590
30	5	Matt Mills	B. J. McLeod Motorsports	Chevrolet	24.619
31	13	Timmy Hill	MBM Motorsports	Toyota	24.752
32	52	David Starr	Jimmy Means Racing	Chevrolet	24.755
33	78	Vinnie Miller	B. J. McLeod Motorsports	Chevrolet	24.889
34	89	Morgan Shepherd	Shepherd Racing Ventures	Chevrolet	24.989
35	0	Garrett Smithley	JD Motorsports	Chevrolet	25.216
36	66	Stan Mullis	MBM Motorsports	Toyota	25.280
37	74	Mike Harmon	Mike Harmon Racing	Chevrolet	25.710
38	01	Ryan Repko	JD Motorsports	Chevrolet	0.000
Did not qualify
39	17	Mark Meunier	Rick Ware Racing	Chevrolet	45.262

== Race ==
=== Summary ===
Christopher Bell started on pole and lead for the first 49 laps. The first cautions occurred when Justin Allgaier and Austin Cindric both hit the wall on lap 45. Bell won stage 1 ahead of Cole Custer. On lap 75, Riley Herbst spun and collected Jeremy Clements. Stage 2 was also won by Bell, whose strong lead continued.

In the later half of the race, David Starr and Cole Custer each ended up hitting the wall on separate instances and brought out cautions. With 48 laps to go, Michael Annett brought out a caution after spinning in turn 2. On lap 219, the caution was thrown for fluid on the track. Cleaning trucks were in the entrance of pit road when the drivers began pitting, and Dillon Bassett crashed into the rear of one of the trucks, heavily damaging his car.

In the final moments of the race, Chase Briscoe raced hard with Tyler Reddick and John Hunter Nemechek, eventually leaving them behind while Bell's lead increased. With 5 laps remaining, Briscoe caught up to Bell, driving alongside him before taking the lead due to better cornering. Briscoe was able to hold off Bell to score his first win of the year.

=== Stage Results ===
Stage One Laps: 60

Pos	No	Driver	Team	Manufacturer	Points
1	20	Christopher Bell	Joe Gibbs Racing	Toyota	10
2	00	Cole Custer	Stewart-Haas Racing with Biagi-DenBeste	Ford	9
3	98	Chase Briscoe (R)	Stewart-Haas Racing with Biagi-DenBeste	Ford	8
4	19	Brandon Jones	Joe Gibbs Racing	Toyota	7
5	7	Justin Allgaier	JR Motorsports	Chevrolet	6
6	2	Tyler Reddick	Richard Childress Racing	Chevrolet	5
7	11	Justin Haley (R)	Kaulig Racing	Chevrolet	4
8	23	John Hunter Nemechek (R)	GMS Racing	Chevrolet	3
9	1	Michael Annett	JR Motorsports	Chevrolet	2
10	18	Riley Herbst (i)	Joe Gibbs Racing	Toyota	0

Stage Two Laps: 60

Pos	No	Driver	Team	Manufacturer	Points
1	20	Christopher Bell	Joe Gibbs Racing	Toyota	10
2	98	Chase Briscoe (R)	Stewart-Haas Racing with Biagi-DenBeste	Ford	9
3	2	Tyler Reddick	Richard Childress Racing	Chevrolet	8
4	00	Cole Custer	Stewart-Haas Racing with Biagi-DenBeste	Ford	7
5	11	Justin Haley (R)	Kaulig Racing	Chevrolet	6
6	23	John Hunter Nemechek (R)	GMS Racing	Chevrolet	5
7	1	Michael Annett	JR Motorsports	Chevrolet	4
8	39	Ryan Sieg	RSS Racing	Chevrolet	3
9	8	Zane Smith	JR Motorsports	Chevrolet	2
10	7	Justin Allgaier	JR Motorsports	Chevrolet	1

=== Final Stage Results ===
Stage Three Laps: 130

Pos	Grid	No	Driver	Team	Manufacturer	Laps	Points
1	2	98	Chase Briscoe (R)	Stewart-Haas Racing with Biagi-DenBeste	Ford	250	57
2	1	20	Christopher Bell	Joe Gibbs Racing	Toyota	250	55
3	14	23	John Hunter Nemechek (R)	GMS Racing	Chevrolet	250	42
4	13	9	Noah Gragson (R)	JR Motorsports	Chevrolet	250	33
5	11	2	Tyler Reddick	Richard Childress Racing	Chevrolet	250	45
6	5	7	Justin Allgaier	JR Motorsports	Chevrolet	250	38
7	7	28	Shane Lee	H2 Motorsports	Toyota	250	30
8	15	11	Justin Haley (R)	Kaulig Racing	Chevrolet	250	39
9	12	8	Zane Smith	JR Motorsports	Chevrolet	250	30
10	9	1	Michael Annett	JR Motorsports	Chevrolet	250	33
11	24	07	Ray Black Jr.	SS-Green Light Racing	Chevrolet	250	26
12	10	39	Ryan Sieg	RSS Racing	Chevrolet	250	28
13	4	18	Riley Herbst (i)	Joe Gibbs Racing	Toyota	250	0
14	19	08	Gray Gaulding	SS-Green Light Racing	Chevrolet	250	23
15	29	36	Josh Williams (R)	DGM Racing	Chevrolet	250	22
16	25	4	Stephen Leicht	JD Motorsports	Chevrolet	249	21
17	23	15	Ryan Vargas	JD Motorsports	Chevrolet	249	20
18	30	5	Matt Mills (R)	B. J. McLeod Motorsports	Chevrolet	249	19
19	26	35	Joey Gase	MBM Motorsports	Toyota	248	18
20	33	78	Vinnie Miller	B. J. McLeod Motorsports	Chevrolet	246	17
21	28	99	Stefan Parsons	B. J. McLeod Motorsports	Chevrolet	246	16
22	35	0	Garrett Smithley	JD Motorsports	Chevrolet	245	15
23	36	66	Stan Mullis	MBM Motorsports	Toyota	243	14
24	27	93	Camden Murphy (i)	RSS Racing	Chevrolet	239	0
25	38	01	Ryan Repko	JD Motorsports	Chevrolet	237	12
26	17	90	Dillon Bassett	DGM Racing	Chevrolet	222	11
27	20	86	Brandon Brown	Brandonbilt Motorsports	Chevrolet	217	10
28	21	68	Will Rodgers	Brandonbilt Motorsports	Chevrolet	211	9
29	6	00	Cole Custer	Stewart-Haas Racing with Biagi-DenBeste	Ford	160	24
30	16	51	Jeremy Clements	Jeremy Clements Racing	Chevrolet	160	7
31	32	52	David Starr	Jimmy Means Racing	Chevrolet	150	6
32	22	42	Chad Finchum	MBM Motorsports	Toyota	113	5
33	3	19	Brandon Jones	Joe Gibbs Racing	Toyota	105	11
34	37	74	Mike Harmon	Mike Harmon Racing	Chevrolet	87	3
35	31	13	Timmy Hill	MBM Motorsports	Toyota	80	2
36	34	89	Morgan Shepherd	Shepherd Racing Ventures	Chevrolet	73	1
37	8	22	Austin Cindric	Team Penske	Ford	43	1
38	18	38	J. J. Yeley (i)	RSS Racing	Chevrolet	5	0

Previous race: 2019 ROXOR 200	NASCAR Xfinity Series; 2019 season	Next race: 2019 Zippo 200 at The Glen
