= 2019 Food City 300 =

Race details
- Race 22 of 33 in the 2019 NASCAR Xfinity Series season
- Date: August 16, 2019
- Location: Bristol Motor Speedway in Bristol, Tennessee
- Course: Permanent racing facility
- Course length: 0.533 miles (0.858 km)
- Distance: 300 laps, 159.9 mi (257.3 km)

Pole position
Driver	Austin Cindric	Team Penske
- Time: 15.655

Most laps led
Driver	Kyle Busch	Joe Gibbs Racing
- Laps: 137

Winner
No. 2	Tyler Reddick	Richard Childress Racing

Television in the United States
- Network: NBCSN

Radio in the United States
- Radio: MRN

The 2019 Food City 300 is a NASCAR Xfinity Series race held on August 16, 2019, at Bristol Motor Speedway in Bristol, Tennessee. Contested over 300 laps on the 0.533 miles (0.858 km) concrete short track, it was the 22nd race of the 2019 NASCAR Xfinity Series season.

== Background ==
=== Track ===
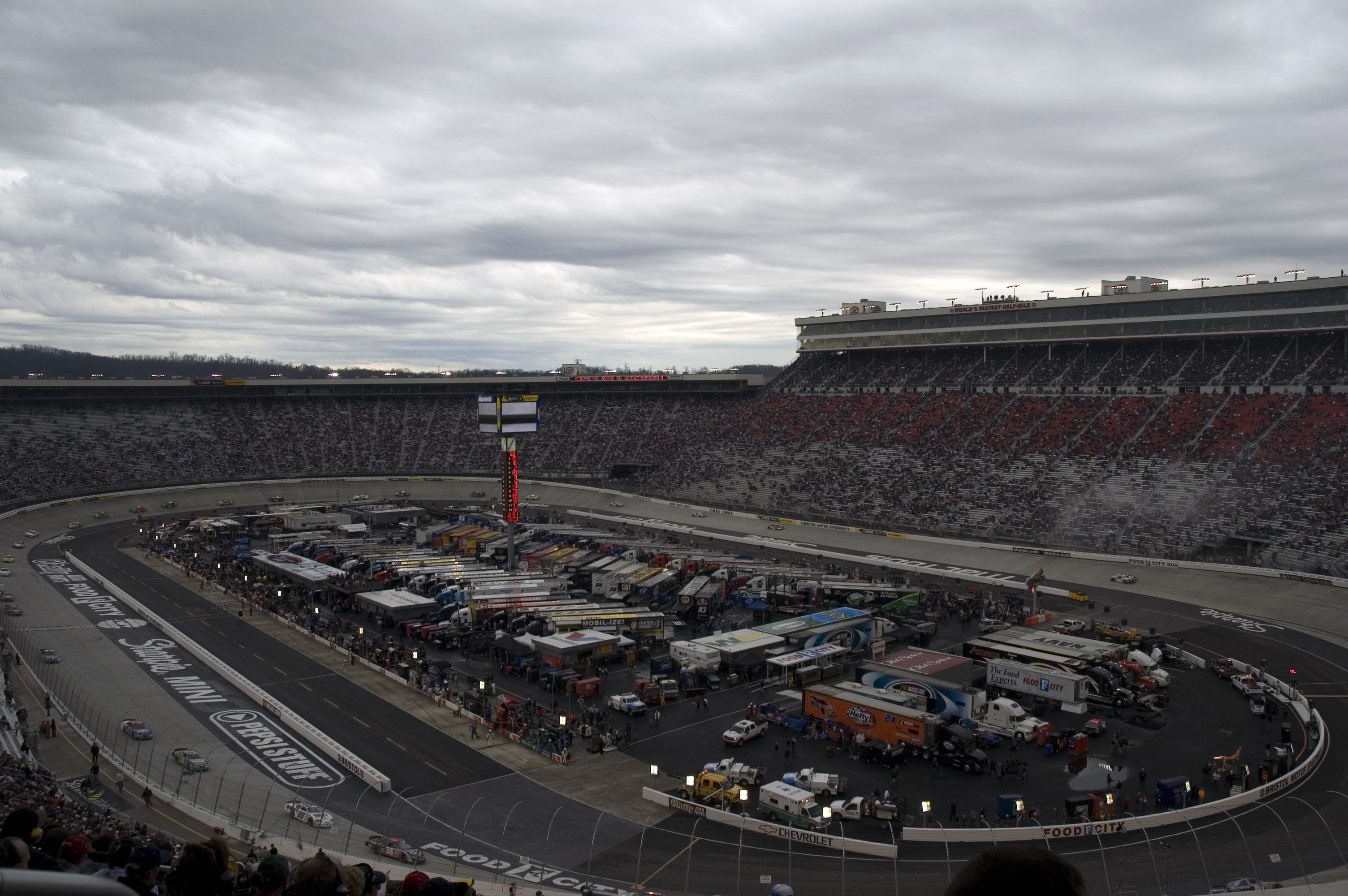
Bristol Motor Speedway, the track where the race was held.

Bristol Motor Speedway, formerly known as Bristol International Raceway and Bristol Raceway, is a NASCAR short track venue located in Bristol, Tennessee. Constructed in 1960, it held its first NASCAR race on July 30, 1961. Despite its short length, Bristol is among the most popular tracks on the NASCAR schedule because of its distinct features, which include steep banking, an all concrete surface, two pit roads, and stadium-like seating.

== Entry list ==
No.	Driver	Team	Manufacturer
00	Cole Custer	Stewart-Haas Racing with Biagi-DenBeste Racing	Ford
0	Garrett Smithley	JD Motorsports	Chevrolet
01	Stephen Leicht	JD Motorsports	Chevrolet
1	Michael Annett	JR Motorsports	Chevrolet
2	Tyler Reddick	Richard Childress Racing	Chevrolet
4	Landon Cassill	JD Motorsports	Chevrolet
5	Matt Mills	B. J. McLeod Motorsports	Chevrolet
07	Ray Black Jr.	SS-Green Light Racing	Chevrolet
7	Justin Allgaier	JR Motorsports	Chevrolet
08	Gray Gaulding (R)	SS-Green Light Racing	Chevrolet
8	Jeb Burton	JR Motorsports	Chevrolet
9	Noah Gragson (R)	JR Motorsports	Chevrolet
10	Joe Graf Jr.	Kaulig Racing	Chevrolet
11	Justin Haley (R)	Kaulig Racing	Chevrolet
12	Joey Logano (i)	Team Penske	Ford
13	Tommy Joe Martins	MBM Motorsports	Toyota
15	B. J. McLeod	JD Motorsports	Chevrolet
17	Joe Nemechek (Note: Bayley Currey was entered for the No. 17 but was suspended by NASCAR on Thursday before the race due to violating the substance abuse policy. Mike Harmon practiced the car and Joe Nemechek replaced Currey in the No. 17 in the qualifying and in the race as a result.) (i)	Rick Ware Racing	Chevrolet
18	Kyle Busch (i)	Joe Gibbs Racing	Toyota
19	Brandon Jones	Joe Gibbs Racing	Toyota
20	Christopher Bell	Joe Gibbs Racing	Toyota
22	Austin Cindric	Team Penske	Ford
23	John Hunter Nemechek (R)	GMS Racing	Chevrolet
28	Shane Lee	H2 Motorsports	Toyota
35	Joey Gase	MBM Motorsports	Toyota
36	Josh Williams	DGM Racing	Chevrolet
38	Camden Murphy (i)	RSS Racing	Chevrolet
39	Ryan Sieg	RSS Racing	Chevrolet
51	Jeremy Clements	Jeremy Clements Racing	Chevrolet
52	David Starr	Jimmy Means Racing	Chevrolet
61	Timmy Hill	MBM Motorsports	Toyota
66	Chad Finchum	MBM Motorsports	Toyota
68	Mason Diaz	Brandonbilt Motorsports	Chevrolet
74	Tyler Matthews	Mike Harmon Racing	Chevrolet
78	Vinnie Miller	B. J. McLeod Motorsports	Chevrolet
81	Erik Jones (i)	XCI Racing	Toyota
86	Brandon Brown (R)	Brandonbilt Motorsports	Chevrolet
89	Morgan Shepherd	Shepherd Racing Ventures	Chevrolet
90	Ronnie Bassett Jr.	DGM Racing	Chevrolet
93	J. J. Yeley (i)	RSS Racing	Chevrolet
98	Chase Briscoe (R)	Stewart-Haas Racing with Biagi-DenBeste Racing	Ford
99	C. J. McLaughlin	B. J. McLeod Motorsports	Toyota

== Practice ==
=== First practice ===
Erik Jones was the fastest in the first practice session with a time of 15.385 seconds and a speed of 124.719 mph (200.716 km/h).

Pos	No.	Driver	Team	Manufacturer	Time	Speed
1	81	Erik Jones (i)	XCI Racing	Toyota	15.385	124.719
2	18	Kyle Busch (i)	Joe Gibbs Racing	Toyota	15.402	124.581
3	20	Christopher Bell	Joe Gibbs Racing	Toyota	15.404	124.565

=== Final practice ===
Erik Jones was the fastest in the final practice session with a time of 15.522 seconds and a speed of 123.618 mph (198.944 km/h).

Pos	No.	Driver	Team	Manufacturer	Time	Speed
1	81	Erik Jones (i)	XCI Racing	Toyota	15.522	123.618
2	20	Christopher Bell	Joe Gibbs Racing	Toyota	15.557	123.340
3	12	Joey Logano (i)	Team Penske	Ford	15.585	123.118

== Qualifying ==
Austin Cindric scored the pole for the race with a time of 15.655 seconds and a speed of 122.568 mph (197.254 km/h).

=== Qualifying results ===
Pos	No	Driver	Team	Manufacturer	Time
1	22	Austin Cindric	Team Penske	Ford	15.655
2	18	Kyle Busch (i)	Joe Gibbs Racing	Toyota	15.677
3	7	Justin Allgaier	JR Motorsports	Chevrolet	15.697
4	00	Cole Custer	Stewart-Haas Racing with Biagi-DenBeste Racing	Ford	15.704
5	51	Jeremy Clements	Jeremy Clements Racing	Chevrolet	15.729
6	98	Chase Briscoe (R)	Stewart-Haas Racing with Biagi-DenBeste Racing	Ford	15.776
7	8	Jeb Burton	JR Motorsports	Chevrolet	15.787
8	20	Christopher Bell	Joe Gibbs Racing	Toyota	15.792
9	23	John Hunter Nemechek (R)	GMS Racing	Chevrolet	15.854
10	9	Noah Gragson (R)	JR Motorsports	Chevrolet	15.855
11	11	Justin Haley (R)	Kaulig Racing	Chevrolet	15.877
12	19	Brandon Jones	Joe Gibbs Racing	Toyota	15.894
13	08	Gray Gaulding (R)	SS-Green Light Racing	Chevrolet	15.914
14	39	Ryan Sieg	RSS Racing	Chevrolet	15.948
15	1	Michael Annett	JR Motorsports	Chevrolet	15.967
16	81	Erik Jones (i)	XCI Racing	Toyota	15.974
17	86	Brandon Brown (R)	Brandonbilt Motorsports	Chevrolet	16.076
18	93	J. J. Yeley (i)	RSS Racing	Chevrolet	16.092
19	12	Joey Logano (i)	Team Penske	Ford	16.108
20	4	Landon Cassill	JD Motorsports	Chevrolet	16.117
21	61	Timmy Hill	MBM Motorsports	Toyota	16.169
22	28	Shane Lee	H2 Motorsports	Toyota	16.210
23	52	David Starr	Jimmy Means Racing	Chevrolet	16.211
24	07	Ray Black Jr.	SS-Green Light Racing	Chevrolet	16.218
25	13	Tommy Joe Martins	MBM Motorsports	Toyota	16.324
26	78	Vinnie Miller	B. J. McLeod Motorsports	Chevrolet	16.355
27	68	Mason Diaz	Brandonbilt Motorsports	Chevrolet	16.461
28	17	Joe Nemechek (i)	Rick Ware Racing	Chevrolet	16.488
29	90	Ronnie Bassett Jr.	DGM Racing	Chevrolet	16.491
30	5	Matt Mills	B. J. McLeod Motorsports	Chevrolet	16.523
31	74	Tyler Matthews	Mike Harmon Racing	Chevrolet	16.550
32	35	Joey Gase	MBM Motorsports	Toyota	16.555
33	36	Josh Williams	DGM Racing	Chevrolet	16.565
34	15	B. J. McLeod	JD Motorsports	Chevrolet	16.659
35	99	C. J. McLaughlin	B. J. McLeod Motorsports	Toyota	17.184
36	0	Garrett Smithley	JD Motorsports	Chevrolet	17.192
37	01	Stephen Leicht	JD Motorsports	Chevrolet	17.391
38	2	Tyler Reddick	Richard Childress Racing	Chevrolet	0.000
Did not qualify
39	66	Chad Finchum	MBM Motorsports	Toyota	16.573
40	10	Joe Graf Jr.	Kaulig Racing	Chevrolet	16.611
41	38	Camden Murphy (i)	RSS Racing	Chevrolet	16.703
42	89	Morgan Shepherd	Shepherd Racing Ventures	Chevrolet	17.285

== Race ==
=== Summary ===
Austin Cindric started on pole. Early on in the race, Matt Mills (who was a lap down) squeezed Cole Custer into the wall as he and Christopher Bell battled within the top 5, sending Custer sliding into Bell. The two leaned into the following turn, where Erik Jones and Joey Logano were also collected and eliminated. On the restart, John Hunter Nemechek got a flat tire but saved the car. He spun again in front of Kyle Busch, who was nearly smashed into the outside wall. Justin Allgaier took the lead from Busch on lap 61.

Tyler Reddick later caught up to Allgaier, but made contact with him after driving too deep into the corner. Brandon Jones overtook Allgaier and Reddick after they both spun out (though Allgaier prevented his car from colliding into the wall) and won Stage 1.

In the beginning of Stage 2, Ronnie Bassett Jr. lost a wheel going into a turn in front of Busch and spun out, causing a red flag. Busch won the stage despite his engine struggling. His car's motor blew immediately after winning the stage, subsequently ending his day.

Michael Annett spun halfway into the final stage and brought out a caution. Allgaier strategically stayed out, while Reddick pitted. Ryan Sieg ran in second place but got into the wall and had a tire rub that forced him to pit and ultimately retire from the race. With 11 laps to go, Brandon Jones who was 2nd at the moment went to the outside wall. In the following lap, with 10 laps to go, Allgaier had a significant lead on Reddick, but he had a tire beginning to go down. Reddick benefited from this and overtook him, taking the victory over Chase Briscoe.

=== Stage Results ===
Stage One Laps: 85

Pos	No	Driver	Team	Manufacturer	Points
1	19	Brandon Jones	Joe Gibbs Racing	Toyota	10
2	7	Justin Allgaier	JR Motorsports	Chevrolet	9
3	39	Ryan Sieg	RSS Racing	Chevrolet	8
4	1	Michael Annett	JR Motorsports	Chevrolet	7
5	9	Noah Gragson (R)	JR Motorsports	Chevrolet	6
6	4	Landon Cassill	JD Motorsports	Chevrolet	5
7	18	Kyle Busch (i)	Joe Gibbs Racing	Toyota	0
8	08	Gray Gaulding	SS-Green Light Racing	Chevrolet	3
9	36	Josh Williams	DGM Racing	Chevrolet	2
10	0	Garrett Smithley	JD Motorsports	Chevrolet	1

Stage Two Laps: 85

Pos	No	Driver	Team	Manufacturer	Points
1	18	Kyle Busch (i)	Joe Gibbs Racing	Toyota	0
2	2	Tyler Reddick	Richard Childress Racing	Chevrolet	9
3	7	Justin Allgaier	JR Motorsports	Chevrolet	8
4	22	Austin Cindric	Team Penske	Ford	7
5	23	John Hunter Nemechek (R)	GMS Racing	Chevrolet	6
6	19	Brandon Jones	Joe Gibbs Racing	Toyota	5
7	98	Chase Briscoe (R)	Stewart-Haas Racing with Biagi-DenBeste	Ford	4
8	1	Michael Annett	JR Motorsports	Chevrolet	3
9	39	Ryan Sieg	RSS Racing	Chevrolet	2
10	51	Jeremy Clements	Jeremy Clements Racing	Chevrolet	1

=== Final Stage Results ===
Stage Three Laps: 130

Pos	Grid	No	Driver	Team	Manufacturer	Laps	Points
1	38	2	Tyler Reddick	Richard Childress Racing	Chevrolet	300	49
2	6	98	Chase Briscoe (R)	Stewart-Haas Racing with Biagi-DenBeste	Ford	300	39
3	9	23	John Hunter Nemechek (R)	GMS Racing	Chevrolet	300	40
4	5	51	Jeremy Clements	Jeremy Clements Racing	Chevrolet	300	34
5	1	22	Austin Cindric	Team Penske	Ford	300	39
6	13	08	Gray Gaulding	SS-Green Light Racing	Chevrolet	300	34
7	21	61	Timmy Hill	MBM Motorsports	Toyota	299	30
8	3	7	Justin Allgaier	JR Motorsports	Chevrolet	298	46
9	15	1	Michael Annett	JR Motorsports	Chevrolet	298	38
10	20	4	Landon Cassill	JD Motorsports	Chevrolet	298	32
11	12	19	Brandon Jones	Joe Gibbs Racing	Toyota	298	41
12	17	86	Brandon Brown (R)	Brandonbilt Motorsports	Chevrolet	297	25
13	22	28	Shane Lee	H2 Motorsports	Toyota	297	24
14	8	20	Christopher Bell	Joe Gibbs Racing	Toyota	297	23
15	24	07	Ray Black Jr.	SS-Green Light Racing	Chevrolet	297	22
16	18	93	J. J. Yeley (i)	RSS Racing	Chevrolet	297	0
17	10	9	Noah Gragson (R)	JR Motorsports	Chevrolet	296	26
18	30	5	Matt Mills	B. J. McLeod Motorsports	Chevrolet	296	19
19	37	01	Stephen Leicht	JD Motorsports	Chevrolet	292	18
20	32	35	Joey Gase	MBM Motorsports	Toyota	292	17
21	26	78	Vinnie Miller	B. J. McLeod Motorsports	Chevrolet	292	16
22	4	00	Cole Custer	Stewart-Haas Racing with Biagi-DenBeste	Ford	291	15
23	35	99	C. J. McLaughlin	B. J. McLeod Motorsports	Toyota	275	14
24	23	52	David Starr	Jimmy Means Racing	Chevrolet	273	13
25	14	39	Ryan Sieg	RSS Racing	Chevrolet	263	22
26	34	15	B. J. McLeod	JD Motorsports	Chevrolet	244	11
27	31	74	Tyler Matthews	Mike Harmon Racing	Chevrolet	210	10
28	36	0	Garrett Smithley	JD Motorsports	Chevrolet	186	10
29	2	18	Kyle Busch (i)	Joe Gibbs Racing	Toyota	171	0
30	33	36	Josh Williams	DGM Racing	Chevrolet	154	9
31	25	13	Tommy Joe Martins	MBM Motorsports	Toyota	131	6
32	7	8	Jeb Burton	JR Motorsports	Chevrolet	125	5
33	29	90	Ronnie Bassett Jr.	DGM Racing	Chevrolet	118	4
34	11	11	Justin Haley (R)	Kaulig Racing	Chevrolet	79	3
35	28	17	Joe Nemechek (i)	Rick Ware Racing	Chevrolet	43	0
36	19	12	Joey Logano (i)	Team Penske	Ford	37	0
37	16	81	Erik Jones (i)	XCI Racing	Toyota	36	0
38	27	68	Mason Diaz	Brandonbilt Motorsports	Chevrolet	3	1

== Notes ==
Previous race: 2019 B&L Transport 170	NASCAR Xfinity Series; 2019 season	Next race: 2019 CTECH Manufacturing 180
