= 2019 ROXOR 200 =

Race details
- Race 18 of 33 in the 2019 NASCAR Xfinity Series season
- Date: July 20, 2019
- Location: New Hampshire Motor Speedway in Loudon, New Hampshire
- Course: Permanent racing facility
- Course length: 1.703 km (1.058 miles)
- Distance: 200 laps, 211 mi (340 km)

Pole position
Driver	Cole Custer	Stewart-Haas Racing with Biagi-DenBeste Racing
- Time: 29.180

Most laps led
Driver	Christopher Bell	Joe Gibbs Racing
- Laps: 186

Winner
No. 20	Christopher Bell	Joe Gibbs Racing

Television in the United States
- Network: NBCSN

Radio in the United States
- Radio: MRN

The 2019 ROXOR 200 was a NASCAR Xfinity Series race held on July 20, 2019, at New Hampshire Motor Speedway in Loudon, New Hampshire. Contested over 200 laps on the 1.058-mile (1.703 km) speedway, it was the 18th race of the 2019 NASCAR Xfinity Series season.

== Background ==
=== Track ===
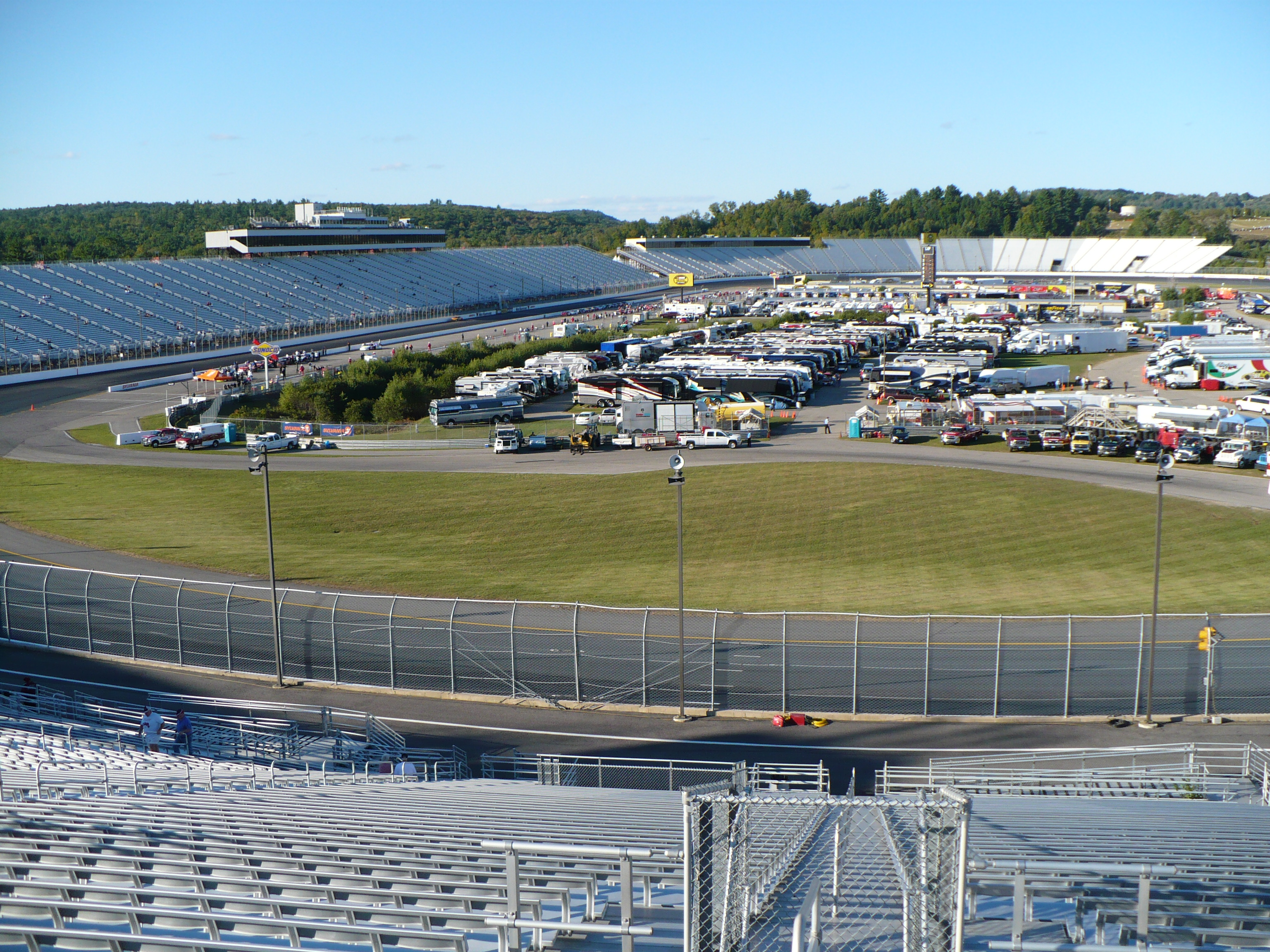
New Hampshire Motor Speedway, the track where the race was held.

New Hampshire Motor Speedway is a 1.058-mile (1.703 km) oval speedway located in Loudon, New Hampshire, which has hosted NASCAR racing annually since the early 1990s, as well as the longest-running motorcycle race in North America, the Loudon Classic. Nicknamed "The Magic Mile", the speedway is often converted into a 1.6-mile (2.6 km) road course, which includes much of the oval.

The track was originally the site of Bryar Motorsports Park before being purchased and redeveloped by Bob Bahre. The track is currently one of eight major NASCAR tracks owned and operated by Speedway Motorsports.

== Entry list ==
No.	Driver	Team	Manufacturer
00	Cole Custer	Stewart-Haas Racing with Biagi-DenBeste Racing	Ford
0	Garrett Smithley	JD Motorsports	Chevrolet
01	B. J. McLeod	JD Motorsports	Chevrolet
1	Michael Annett	JR Motorsports	Chevrolet
2	Tyler Reddick	Richard Childress Racing	Chevrolet
4	Stephen Leicht	JD Motorsports	Chevrolet
5	Matt Mills (R)	B. J. McLeod Motorsports	Chevrolet
07	Ray Black Jr.	SS-Green Light Racing	Chevrolet
7	Justin Allgaier	JR Motorsports	Chevrolet
08	Gray Gaulding (R)	SS-Green Light Racing	Chevrolet
8	Ryan Truex	JR Motorsports	Chevrolet
9	Noah Gragson (R)	JR Motorsports	Chevrolet
11	Justin Haley (R)	Kaulig Racing	Chevrolet
12	Paul Menard (i)	Team Penske	Ford
13	Carl Long	MBM Motorsports	Toyota
15	Tyler Matthews	JD Motorsports	Chevrolet
17	Bayley Currey (i)	Rick Ware Racing	Chevrolet
18	Harrison Burton (i)	Joe Gibbs Racing	Toyota
19	Brandon Jones	Joe Gibbs Racing	Toyota
20	Christopher Bell	Joe Gibbs Racing	Toyota
21	Kaz Grala	Richard Childress Racing	Chevrolet
22	Austin Cindric	Team Penske	Ford
23	John Hunter Nemechek (R)	GMS Racing	Chevrolet
28	Shane Lee	H2 Motorsports	Toyota
35	Joey Gase	MBM Motorsports	Toyota
36	Josh Williams	DGM Racing	Chevrolet
38	Josh Bilicki	RSS Racing	Chevrolet
39	C. J. McLaughlin	RSS Racing	Chevrolet
42	Chad Finchum	MBM Motorsports	Toyota
51	Jeremy Clements	Jeremy Clements Racing	Chevrolet
52	David Starr	Jimmy Means Racing	Chevrolet
66	Timmy Hill	MBM Motorsports	Toyota
68	Dillon Bassett	Brandonbilt Motorsports	Chevrolet
74	Camden Murphy (i)	Mike Harmon Racing	Chevrolet
78	Vinnie Miller	B. J. McLeod Motorsports	Chevrolet
86	Brandon Brown	Brandonbilt Motorsports	Chevrolet
89	Landon Cassill	Shepherd Racing Ventures	Chevrolet
90	Alex Labbé	DGM Racing	Chevrolet
93	Ryan Sieg	RSS Racing	Chevrolet
98	Chase Briscoe (R)	Stewart-Haas Racing with Biagi-DenBeste Racing	Ford
99	Tommy Joe Martins	B. J. McLeod Motorsports	Toyota

== Practice ==
=== First practice ===
Christopher Bell was the fastest in the first practice session with a time of 29.736 seconds and a speed of 128.087 mph (206.136 km/h).

Pos	No.	Driver	Team	Manufacturer	Time	Speed
1	20	Christopher Bell	Joe Gibbs Racing	Toyota	29.736	128.087
2	00	Cole Custer	Stewart-Haas Racing with Biagi-DenBeste Racing	Ford	29.902	127.376
3	7	Justin Allgaier	JR Motorsports	Chevrolet	29.931	127.253

=== Final practice ===
Justin Haley was the fastest in the final practice session with a time of 29.638 seconds and a speed of 128.511 mph (206.818 km/h).

Pos	No.	Driver	Team	Manufacturer	Time	Speed
1	11	Justin Haley (R)	Kaulig Racing	Chevrolet	29.638	128.511
2	20	Christopher Bell	Joe Gibbs Racing	Toyota	29.676	128.346
3	00	Cole Custer	Stewart-Haas Racing with Biagi-DenBeste Racing	Ford	29.800	127.812

== Qualifying ==
Cole Custer scored the pole for the race with a time of 29.180 seconds and a speed of 130.528 mph (210.064 km/h).

=== Qualifying results ===
Pos	No	Driver	Team	Manufacturer	Time
1	00	Cole Custer	Stewart-Haas Racing with Biagi-DenBeste Racing	Ford	29.180
2	20	Christopher Bell	Joe Gibbs Racing	Toyota	29.256
3	22	Austin Cindric	Team Penske	Ford	29.328
4	12	Paul Menard (i)	Team Penske	Ford	29.349
5	98	Chase Briscoe (R)	Stewart-Haas Racing with Biagi-DenBeste Racing	Ford	29.379
6	19	Brandon Jones	Joe Gibbs Racing	Toyota	29.477
7	18	Harrison Burton (i)	Joe Gibbs Racing	Toyota	29.501
8	7	Justin Allgaier	JR Motorsports	Chevrolet	29.504
9	8	Ryan Truex	JR Motorsports	Chevrolet	29.519
10	9	Noah Gragson (R)	JR Motorsports	Chevrolet	29.527
11	2	Tyler Reddick	Richard Childress Racing	Chevrolet	29.539
12	21	Kaz Grala	Richard Childress Racing	Chevrolet	29.570
13	11	Justin Haley (R)	Kaulig Racing	Chevrolet	29.573
14	51	Jeremy Clements	Jeremy Clements Racing	Chevrolet	29.635
15	93	Ryan Sieg	RSS Racing	Chevrolet	29.635
16	1	Michael Annett	JR Motorsports	Chevrolet	29.665
17	23	John Hunter Nemechek (R)	GMS Racing	Chevrolet	29.908
18	4	Stephen Leicht	JD Motorsports	Chevrolet	29.926
19	90	Alex Labbé	DGM Racing	Chevrolet	29.949
20	08	Gray Gaulding (R)	SS-Green Light Racing	Chevrolet	29.960
21	86	Brandon Brown	Brandonbilt Motorsports	Chevrolet	30.075
22	42	Chad Finchum	MBM Motorsports	Toyota	30.079
23	13	Carl Long	MBM Motorsports	Toyota	30.150
24	89	Landon Cassill	Shepherd Racing Ventures	Chevrolet	30.167
25	07	Ray Black Jr.	SS-Green Light Racing	Chevrolet	30.175
26	99	Tommy Joe Martins	B. J. McLeod Motorsports	Toyota	30.239
27	36	Josh Williams	DGM Racing	Chevrolet	30.258
28	78	Ross Chastain	B. J. McLeod Motorsports	Chevrolet	30.278
29	28	Shane Lee	H2 Motorsports	Toyota	30.351
30	0	Garrett Smithley	JD Motorsports	Chevrolet	30.363
31	5	Matt Mills (R)	B. J. McLeod Motorsports	Chevrolet	30.377
32	52	David Starr	Jimmy Means Racing	Chevrolet	30.385
33	17	Bayley Currey (i)	Rick Ware Racing	Chevrolet	30.453
34	35	Joey Gase	MBM Motorsports	Toyota	30.482
35	66	Timmy Hill	MBM Motorsports	Toyota	30.600
36	01	B. J. McLeod	JD Motorsports	Chevrolet	30.672
37	39	C. J. McLaughlin	RSS Racing	Chevrolet	30.706
38	15	Tyler Matthews	JD Motorsports	Chevrolet	30.846
Did not qualify
39	68	Dillon Bassett	Brandonbilt Motorsports	Chevrolet	30.548
40	38	Josh Bilicki	RSS Racing	Chevrolet	30.800
41	74	Camden Murphy (i)	Mike Harmon Racing	Chevrolet	0.000

- Ross Chastain qualified the No. 78 B. J. McLeod Motorsports Chevrolet for Vinnie Miller.

== Race ==
=== Summary ===
Cole Custer started on pole, but Christopher Bell overtook him before the first lap, causing Custer to ultimately not lead a single lap during the race. The first caution occurred on lap 33 when John Hunter Nemechek's car backed into the wall due to brake failure, causing heavy rear-end damage from which he couldn't recover. By the end of Stage 1, Tyler Reddick drove low under Brandon Jones in a desperate attempt to overtake him. They battled on the frontstretch, nearly allowing Bell to capture the win, but Jones managed to hang on and win the stage.

Stage 2 did not see any cautions, and Bell was able to win the stage ahead of Justin Allgaier. On lap 142, Noah Gragson spun and the caution was thrown for debris. The ensuing restart tightened the field, with Paul Menard and Harrison Burton racing each other particularly hard. On lap 155, Menard slammed Burton, who spun and made contact with the wall. Burton was not able to recover from the damage sustained. Menard stated after the race that Burton had run into him twice earlier in the race and Menard was "voicing his displeasure". Bell pulled away and continued his dominating lead, eventually holding off Custer and winning the race.

=== Stage Results ===
Stage One Laps: 45

Pos	No	Driver	Team	Manufacturer	Points
1	19	Brandon Jones	Joe Gibbs Racing	Toyota	10
2	20	Christopher Bell	Joe Gibbs Racing	Toyota	9
3	2	Tyler Reddick	Richard Childress Racing	Chevrolet	8
4	93	Ryan Sieg	RSS Racing	Chevrolet	7
5	7	Justin Allgaier	JR Motorsports	Chevrolet	6
6	8	Ryan Truex	JR Motorsports	Chevrolet	5
7	00	Cole Custer	Stewart-Haas Racing with Biagi-DenBeste	Ford	4
8	11	Justin Haley (R)	Kaulig Racing	Chevrolet	3
9	12	Paul Menard (i)	Team Penske	Ford	0
10	98	Chase Briscoe (R)	Stewart-Haas Racing with Biagi-DenBeste	Ford	1

Stage Two Laps: 45

Pos	No	Driver	Team	Manufacturer	Points
1	20	Christopher Bell	Joe Gibbs Racing	Toyota	10
2	7	Justin Allgaier	JR Motorsports	Chevrolet	9
3	00	Cole Custer	Stewart-Haas Racing with Biagi-DenBeste	Ford	8
4	2	Tyler Reddick	Richard Childress Racing	Chevrolet	7
5	12	Paul Menard (i)	Team Penske	Ford	0
6	98	Chase Briscoe (R)	Stewart-Haas Racing with Biagi-DenBeste	Ford	5
7	8	Ryan Truex	JR Motorsports	Chevrolet	4
8	22	Austin Cindric	Team Penske	Ford	3
9	18	Harrison Burton (i)	Joe Gibbs Racing	Toyota	0
10	1	Michael Annett	JR Motorsports	Chevrolet	1

=== Final Stage Results ===
Stage Three Laps: 110

Pos	Grid	No	Driver	Team	Manufacturer	Laps	Points
1	2	20	Christopher Bell	Joe Gibbs Racing	Toyota	200	59
2	1	00	Cole Custer	Stewart-Haas Racing with Biagi-DenBeste	Ford	200	47
3	8	7	Justin Allgaier	JR Motorsports	Chevrolet	200	49
4	11	2	Tyler Reddick	Richard Childress Racing	Chevrolet	200	48
5	4	12	Paul Menard (i)	Team Penske	Ford	200	0
6	5	98	Chase Briscoe (R)	Stewart-Haas Racing with Biagi-DenBeste	Ford	200	37
7	9	8	Ryan Truex	JR Motorsports	Chevrolet	200	39
8	15	93	Ryan Sieg	RSS Racing	Chevrolet	200	36
9	6	19	Brandon Jones	Joe Gibbs Racing	Toyota	200	38
10	10	9	Noah Gragson (R)	JR Motorsports	Chevrolet	200	27
11	16	1	Michael Annett	JR Motorsports	Chevrolet	200	27
12	3	22	Austin Cindric	Team Penske	Ford	200	28
13	13	11	Justin Haley (R)	Kaulig Racing	Chevrolet	200	27
14	12	21	Kaz Grala	Richard Childress Racing	Chevrolet	200	23
15	14	51	Jeremy Clements	Jeremy Clements Racing	Chevrolet	200	22
16	21	86	Brandon Brown	Brandonbilt Motorsports	Chevrolet	200	21
17	20	08	Gray Gaulding	SS-Green Light Racing	Chevrolet	199	20
18	25	07	Ray Black Jr.	SS-Green Light Racing	Chevrolet	199	19
19	27	36	Josh Williams (R)	DGM Racing	Chevrolet	199	18
20	31	5	Matt Mills (R)	B. J. McLeod Motorsports	Chevrolet	198	17
21	36	01	B. J. McLeod	JD Motorsports	Chevrolet	198	16
22	19	90	Alex Labbé	DGM Racing	Chevrolet	197	15
23	18	4	Stephen Leicht	JD Motorsports	Chevrolet	197	14
24	30	0	Garrett Smithley	JD Motorsports	Chevrolet	197	13
25	26	99	Tommy Joe Martins	B. J. McLeod Motorsports	Chevrolet	197	12
26	32	52	David Starr	Jimmy Means Racing	Chevrolet	196	11
27	28	78	Vinnie Miller	B. J. McLeod Motorsports	Chevrolet	195	10
28	37	39	C. J. McLaughlin (i)	RSS Racing	Chevrolet	192	9
29	7	18	Harrison Burton (i)	Joe Gibbs Racing	Toyota	169	0
30	22	42	Chad Finchum	MBM Motorsports	Toyota	167	7
31	34	35	Joey Gase	MBM Motorsports	Toyota	159	6
32	38	15	Tyler Matthews	JD Motorsports	Chevrolet	154	5
33	29	28	Shane Lee	H2 Motorsports	Toyota	112	4
34	35	66	Timmy Hill	MBM Motorsports	Toyota	92	3
35	33	17	Bayley Currey (i)	Rick Ware Racing	Chevrolet	51	0
36	17	23	John Hunter Nemechek (R)	GMS Racing	Chevrolet	31	1
37	24	89	Landon Cassill	Shepherd Racing Ventures	Chevrolet	22	1
38	23	13	Carl Long	MBM Motorsports	Toyota	16	1

Previous race: 2019 Alsco 300 (Kentucky)	NASCAR Xfinity Series; 2019 season	Next race: 2019 U.S. Cellular 250
