= 2019 Alsco 300 (Kentucky) =

Race details
- Race 17 of 33 in the 2019 NASCAR Xfinity Series season
- Layout of Kentucky Speedway
- Date: July 12, 2019
- Location: Kentucky Speedway in Sparta, Kentucky
- Course: Permanent racing facility
- Course length: 1.5 miles (2.4 km)
- Distance: 200 laps, 300 mi (480 km)

Pole position
Driver	Austin Cindric	Team Penske
- Time: 29.995

Most laps led
Driver	Cole Custer	Stewart-Haas Racing with Biagi-DenBeste Racing
- Laps: 88

Winner
No. 00	Cole Custer	Stewart-Haas Racing with Biagi-DenBeste Racing

Television in the United States
- Network: NBCSN

Radio in the United States
- Radio: MRN

The 2019 Alsco 300 is a NASCAR Xfinity Series race held on July 12, 2019, at Kentucky Speedway in Sparta, Kentucky. Contested over 200 laps on the 1.5-mile (2.4 km) tri-oval speedway, it was the 17th race of the 2019 NASCAR Xfinity Series season.

== Background ==
=== Track ===
The track is a 1.5-mile (2.4 km) tri-oval speedway in Sparta, Kentucky, which has hosted ARCA, NASCAR and Indy Racing League racing annually since it opened in 2000. The track is currently owned and operated by Speedway Motorsports. The speedway has a grandstand capacity of 69,000.

== Entry list ==
No.	Driver	Team	Manufacturer
00	Cole Custer	Stewart-Haas Racing with Biagi-DenBeste Racing	Ford
0	Garrett Smithley	JD Motorsports	Chevrolet
01	Stephen Leicht	JD Motorsports	Chevrolet
1	Michael Annett	JR Motorsports	Chevrolet
2	Tyler Reddick	Richard Childress Racing	Chevrolet
4	B. J. McLeod	JD Motorsports	Chevrolet
5	Matt Mills (R)	B. J. McLeod Motorsports	Chevrolet
07	Ray Black Jr.	SS-Green Light Racing	Chevrolet
7	Justin Allgaier	JR Motorsports	Chevrolet
08	Gray Gaulding (R)	SS-Green Light Racing	Chevrolet
8	Ryan Truex	JR Motorsports	Chevrolet
9	Noah Gragson (R)	JR Motorsports	Chevrolet
11	Justin Haley (R)	Kaulig Racing	Chevrolet
13	John Jackson	MBM Motorsports	Toyota
15	Landon Cassill	JD Motorsports	Chevrolet
17	Camden Murphy (i)	Rick Ware Racing	Chevrolet
18	Riley Herbst (i)	Joe Gibbs Racing	Toyota
19	Brandon Jones	Joe Gibbs Racing	Toyota
20	Christopher Bell	Joe Gibbs Racing	Toyota
22	Austin Cindric	Team Penske	Ford
23	John Hunter Nemechek (R)	GMS Racing	Chevrolet
28	Shane Lee	H2 Motorsports	Toyota
35	Joey Gase	MBM Motorsports	Toyota
36	Josh Williams	DGM Racing	Chevrolet
38	Jeff Green	RSS Racing	Chevrolet
39	Ryan Sieg	RSS Racing	Chevrolet
42	Chad Finchum	MBM Motorsports	Toyota
51	Jeremy Clements	Jeremy Clements Racing	Chevrolet
52	David Starr	Jimmy Means Racing	Chevrolet
66	Timmy Hill	MBM Motorsports	Toyota
74	Mike Harmon	Mike Harmon Racing	Chevrolet
78	Vinnie Miller	B. J. McLeod Motorsports	Chevrolet
86	Brandon Brown	Brandonbilt Motorsports	Chevrolet
89	Morgan Shepherd	Shepherd Racing Ventures	Chevrolet
90	Ronnie Bassett Jr.	DGM Racing	Chevrolet
93	Josh Bilicki	RSS Racing	Chevrolet
98	Chase Briscoe (R)	Stewart-Haas Racing with Biagi-DenBeste Racing	Ford
99	Jairo Avila Jr.	B. J. McLeod Motorsports	Chevrolet

== Practice ==
=== First practice ===
Christopher Bell was the fastest in the first practice session with a time of 30.409 seconds and a speed of 177.579 mph (285.786 km/h).

Pos	No.	Driver	Team	Manufacturer	Time	Speed
1	20	Christopher Bell	Joe Gibbs Racing	Toyota	30.409	177.579
2	23	John Hunter Nemechek (R)	GMS Racing	Chevrolet	30.500	177.049
3	2	Tyler Reddick	Richard Childress Racing	Chevrolet	30.533	176.858

=== Final practice ===
Cole Custer was the fastest in the final practice session with a time of 29.965 seconds and a speed of 180.210 mph (290.020 km/h).

Pos	No.	Driver	Team	Manufacturer	Time	Speed
1	00	Cole Custer	Stewart-Haas Racing with Biagi-DenBeste Racing	Ford	29.965	180.210
2	20	Christopher Bell	Joe Gibbs Racing	Toyota	30.011	179.934
3	2	Tyler Reddick	Richard Childress Racing	Chevrolet	30.118	179.295

== Qualifying ==
Austin Cindric scored the pole for the race with a time of 29.995 seconds and a speed of 180.030 mph (289.730 km/h).

=== Qualifying results ===
Pos	No	Driver	Team	Manufacturer	Time
1	22	Austin Cindric	Team Penske	Ford	29.995
2	20	Christopher Bell	Joe Gibbs Racing	Toyota	30.063
3	9	Noah Gragson (R)	JR Motorsports	Chevrolet	30.075
4	7	Justin Allgaier	JR Motorsports	Chevrolet	30.110
5	00	Cole Custer	Stewart-Haas Racing with Biagi-DenBeste Racing	Ford	30.121
6	19	Brandon Jones	Joe Gibbs Racing	Toyota	30.124
7	18	Riley Herbst (i)	Joe Gibbs Racing	Toyota	30.191
8	2	Tyler Reddick	Richard Childress Racing	Chevrolet	30.296
9	98	Chase Briscoe (R)	Stewart-Haas Racing with Biagi-DenBeste Racing	Ford	30.340
10	1	Michael Annett	JR Motorsports	Chevrolet	30.372
11	23	John Hunter Nemechek (R)	GMS Racing	Chevrolet	30.381
12	8	Ryan Truex	JR Motorsports	Chevrolet	30.438
13	39	Ryan Sieg	RSS Racing	Chevrolet	30.448
14	11	Justin Haley (R)	Kaulig Racing	Chevrolet	30.488
15	07	Ray Black Jr.	SS-Green Light Racing	Chevrolet	30.804
16	08	Gray Gaulding (R)	SS-Green Light Racing	Chevrolet	30.907
17	86	Brandon Brown	Brandonbilt Motorsports	Chevrolet	30.959
18	51	Jeremy Clements	Jeremy Clements Racing	Chevrolet	30.994
19	90	Ronnie Bassett Jr.	DGM Racing	Chevrolet	31.102
20	66	Timmy Hill	MBM Motorsports	Toyota	31.154
21	38	Jeff Green	RSS Racing	Chevrolet	31.209
22	5	Matt Mills (R)	B. J. McLeod Motorsports	Chevrolet	31.249
23	01	Stephen Leicht	JD Motorsports	Chevrolet	31.261
24	4	B. J. McLeod	JD Motorsports	Chevrolet	31.289
25	93	Josh Bilicki	RSS Racing	Chevrolet	31.384
26	36	Josh Williams	DGM Racing	Chevrolet	31.407
27	35	Joey Gase	MBM Motorsports	Toyota	31.448
28	28	Shane Lee	H2 Motorsports	Toyota	31.492
29	42	Chad Finchum	MBM Motorsports	Toyota	31.544
30	15	Landon Cassill	JD Motorsports	Chevrolet	31.660
31	52	David Starr	Jimmy Means Racing	Chevrolet	31.758
32	99	Jairo Avila Jr.	B. J. McLeod Motorsports	Chevrolet	31.958
33	89	Morgan Shepherd	Shepherd Racing Ventures	Chevrolet	31.959
34	17	Camden Murphy (i)	Rick Ware Racing	Chevrolet	32.028
35	0	Garrett Smithley	JD Motorsports	Chevrolet	32.161
36	78	Vinnie Miller	B. J. McLeod Motorsports	Chevrolet	32.302
37	74	Mike Harmon	Mike Harmon Racing	Chevrolet	32.431
38	13	John Jackson	MBM Motorsports	Toyota	33.300

== Race ==
=== Summary ===
Austin Cindric started on pole. Christopher Bell overtook him and remained in the lead. Tyler Reddick got loose next to Brandon Jones, but managed to save it. The first caution occurred after Jairo Avila Jr. slammed the wall hard. Bell retook the lead after the caution and won Stage 1.

Justin Haley exited pit road first after only taking two tires as opposed to four. He was unable to hold the lead and was passed by Jones. Cindric got loose next to Haley, turning the rear of Cindric's car into the wall and causing damage to Haley's car. Bell took the lead from Jones until Ronnie Bassett Jr. spun out and brought out the next caution. Bell charged to the front and won Stage 2.

Jones was leading the race with half of the race completed when his engine blew, eliminating him from the race and giving the lead to Chase Briscoe. Later, Cole Custer and Bell passed Briscoe and remained in their positions. Custer continued his dominating lead, lapping the majority of the field. He won the race with a one-second lead over Bell. Custer's strong run resulted in only five cars finishing on the lead lap.

=== Stage results ===
Stage One Laps: 45

Pos	No	Driver	Team	Manufacturer	Points
1	20	Christopher Bell	Joe Gibbs Racing	Toyota	10
2	22	Austin Cindric	Team Penske	Ford	9
3	7	Justin Allgaier	JR Motorsports	Chevrolet	8
4	2	Tyler Reddick	Richard Childress Racing	Chevrolet	7
5	19	Brandon Jones	Joe Gibbs Racing	Toyota	6
6	9	Noah Gragson (R)	JR Motorsports	Chevrolet	5
7	00	Cole Custer	Stewart-Haas Racing with Biagi-DenBeste	Ford	4
8	1	Michael Annett	JR Motorsports	Chevrolet	3
9	18	Riley Herbst (i)	Joe Gibbs Racing	Toyota	0
10	98	Chase Briscoe (R)	Stewart-Haas Racing with Biagi-DenBeste	Ford	1

Stage Two Laps: 45

Pos	No	Driver	Team	Manufacturer	Points
1	20	Christopher Bell	Joe Gibbs Racing	Toyota	10
2	19	Brandon Jones	Joe Gibbs Racing	Toyota	9
3	00	Cole Custer	Stewart-Haas Racing with Biagi-DenBeste	Ford	8
4	9	Noah Gragson (R)	JR Motorsports	Chevrolet	7
5	7	Justin Allgaier	JR Motorsports	Chevrolet	6
6	2	Tyler Reddick	Richard Childress Racing	Chevrolet	5
7	1	Michael Annett	JR Motorsports	Chevrolet	4
8	8	Ryan Truex	JR Motorsports	Chevrolet	3
9	18	Riley Herbst (i)	Joe Gibbs Racing	Toyota	0
10	23	John Hunter Nemechek (R)	GMS Racing	Chevrolet	1

=== Final stage results ===
Stage Three Laps: 110

Pos	Grid	No	Driver	Team	Manufacturer	Laps	Points
1	5	00	Cole Custer	Stewart-Haas Racing with Biagi-DenBeste Racing	Ford	200	52
2	2	20	Christopher Bell	Joe Gibbs Racing	Toyota	200	55
3	8	2	Tyler Reddick	Richard Childress Racing	Chevrolet	200	46
4	10	1	Michael Annett	JR Motorsports	Chevrolet	200	40
5	9	98	Chase Briscoe (R)	Stewart-Haas Racing with Biagi-DenBeste Racing	Ford	200	33
6	3	9	Noah Gragson (R)	JR Motorsports	Chevrolet	199	43
7	4	7	Justin Allgaier	JR Motorsports	Chevrolet	199	44
8	12	8	Ryan Truex	JR Motorsports	Chevrolet	199	32
9	13	39	Ryan Sieg	RSS Racing	Chevrolet	199	28
10	14	11	Justin Haley (R)	Kaulig Racing	Chevrolet	199	27
11	7	18	Riley Herbst (i)	Joe Gibbs Racing	Toyota	199	0
12	11	23	John Hunter Nemechek (R)	GMS Racing	Chevrolet	198	26
13	18	51	Jeremy Clements	Jeremy Clements Racing	Chevrolet	198	24
14	1	22	Austin Cindric	Team Penske	Ford	198	32
15	16	08	Gray Gaulding (R)	SS-Green Light Racing	Chevrolet	198	22
16	28	28	Shane Lee	H2 Motorsports	Toyota	198	21
17	17	86	Brandon Brown	Brandonbilt Motorsports	Chevrolet	197	20
18	26	36	Josh Williams	DGM Racing	Chevrolet	197	19
19	35	0	Garrett Smithley	JD Motorsports	Chevrolet	196	18
20	24	4	B. J. McLeod	JD Motorsports	Chevrolet	196	17
21	31	52	David Starr	Jimmy Means Racing	Chevrolet	195	16
22	27	35	Joey Gase	MBM Motorsports	Toyota	195	15
23	22	5	Matt Mills (R)	B. J. McLeod Motorsports	Chevrolet	194	14
24	23	01	Stephen Leicht	JD Motorsports	Chevrolet	192	13
25	36	78	Vinnie Miller	B. J. McLeod Motorsports	Chevrolet	190	12
26	30	15	Landon Cassill	JD Motorsports	Chevrolet	185	11
27	37	74	Mike Harmon	Mike Harmon Racing	Chevrolet	178	10
28	29	42	Chad Finchum	MBM Motorsports	Toyota	154	9
29	19	90	Ronnie Bassett Jr.	DGM Racing	Chevrolet	114	8
30	6	19	Brandon Jones	Joe Gibbs Racing	Toyota	106	22
31	38	13	John Jackson	MBM Motorsports	Toyota	82	6
32	25	93	Josh Bilicki	RSS Racing	Chevrolet	71	5
33	34	17	Camden Murphy (i)	Rick Ware Racing	Chevrolet	68	0
34	33	89	Morgan Shepherd	Shepherd Racing Ventures	Chevrolet	55	3
35	15	07	Ray Black Jr	SS-Green Light Racing	Chevrolet	39	2
36	21	38	Jeff Green	RSS Racing	Chevrolet	25	1
37	20	66	Timmy Hill	MBM Motorsports	Toyota	18	1
38	32	99	Jairo Avila Jr.	B. J. McLeod Motorsports	Chevrolet	3	1

Previous race: 2019 Circle K Firecracker 250	NASCAR Xfinity Series; 2019 season	Next race: 2019 ROXOR 200
