= Dan Corcoran (racing driver) =

Canadian racing driver

- Born: Daniel D. Corcoran; September 13, 1957 (age 69); Elginburg, Ontario, Canada

NASCAR O'Reilly Auto Parts Series career
- 1 race run over 1 year
- 2019 position: 98th
- Best finish: 98th (2019)
- First race: 2019 Zippo 200 at The Glen (Watkins Glen)
Wins	Top tens	Poles
0	0	0

NASCAR FedEx Freight Truck Series career
- 1 race run over 1 year
- 2019 position: 88th
- Best finish: 88th (2019)
- First race: 2019 Chevrolet Silverado 250 (Mosport)
Wins	Top tens	Poles
0	0	0
- Statistics up to date as of November 18, 2019.

Daniel D. Corcoran (born September 13, 1957) is a Canadian professional stock car racing driver.

== Racing career ==
Corcoran began racing in the Late model class at Kingston Speedway in Ontario, capturing the 1974 class championship before stepping up to dirt modified ranks for several years.

Corcoran then left the driver's seat to join his father's growing construction business. He later returned to racing with the asphalt American Canadian Tour.

Corcoran last competed part-time in the NASCAR O'Reilly Auto Parts Series, driving the No. 74 Chevrolet Camaro for Mike Harmon Racing and in the NASCAR Gander Outdoors Truck Series, driving the No. 33 Chevrolet Silverado for Reaume Brothers Racing.

== Personal life ==
Corcoran is the son of the Kingston and District Hall of Fame driver Len Corcoran, who captured track championships as a car owner at Kingston Speedway, as well as in New York at Watertown Speedway, Evans Mills Speedway, and LaFargeville's Can-Am Speedway.

Corcoran's brother, driver Tony Corcoran, was crowned the inaugural 358-Modified Mr. DIRT champion, and later competed on the NASCAR North Tour.

== Motorsports career results ==
=== NASCAR ===
(key) (Bold – Pole position awarded by qualifying time. Italics – Pole position earned by points standings or practice time. * – Most laps led.)

==== Xfinity Series ====
NASCAR Xfinity Series results
Year	Team	No.	Make	1	2	3	4	5	6	7	8	9	10	11	12	13	14	15	16	17	18	19	20	21	22	23	24	25	26	27	28	29	30	31	32	33	NXSC	Pts	Ref
2019	Mike Harmon Racing	74	Chevy	DAY	ATL	LVS	PHO	CAL	TEX	BRI	RCH	TAL	DOV	CLT	POC	MCH	IOW	CHI	DAY	KEN	NHA	IOW	GLN; 25	MOH	BRI	ROA	DAR	IND	LVS	RCH	CLT	DOV	KAN	TEX	PHO	HOM	98th	0^{1}	

==== Gander Outdoors Truck Series ====
NASCAR Gander Outdoors Truck Series results
Year	Team	No.	Make	1	2	3	4	5	6	7	8	9	10	11	12	13	14	15	16	17	18	19	20	21	22	23	NGOTC	Pts	Ref
2019	Reaume Brothers Racing	33	Chevy	DAY	ATL	LVS	MAR	TEX	DOV	KAN	CLT	TEX	IOW	GTW	CHI	KEN	POC	ELD	MCH	BRI	MSP; 27	LVS	TAL	MAR	PHO	HOM	88th	10	

^{*} Season still in progress
^{1} Ineligible for series points
