= Aaron Quine =

American racing driver (born 1972)

- Born: Aaron M. Quine; June 29, 1972 (age 54); Medina, Ohio, U.S.

NASCAR O'Reilly Auto Parts Series career
- 1 race run over 1 year
- 2019 position: 76th
- Best finish: 76th (2019)
- First race: 2019 B&L Transport 170 (Mid-Ohio)
| Wins | Top tens | Poles |
|---|---|---|
| 0 | 0 | 0 |
- Statistics up to date as of November 18, 2019.

Aaron M. Quine (born June 29, 1972) is an American professional stock car racing driver. He last competed part-time in the NASCAR Xfinity Series, driving the No. 74 Chevrolet Camaro for Mike Harmon Racing. Quine mainly competes in sports car racing, predominantly in the Trans-Am Series.

== Racing career ==
Quine made his Xfinity Series debut at Mid-Ohio. He started 31st and finished 30th after crashing on lap 43.

== Motorsports career results ==
=== NASCAR ===
(key) (Bold – Pole position awarded by qualifying time. Italics – Pole position earned by points standings or practice time. * – Most laps led.)

==== Xfinity Series ====
NASCAR Xfinity Series results
| Year | Team | No. | Make | 1 | 2 | 3 | 4 | 5 | 6 | 7 | 8 | 9 | 10 | 11 | 12 | 13 | 14 | 15 | 16 | 17 | 18 | 19 | 20 | 21 | 22 | 23 | 24 | 25 | 26 | 27 | 28 | 29 | 30 | 31 | 32 | 33 | NXSC | Pts | Ref |
|---|---|---|---|---|---|---|---|---|---|---|---|---|---|---|---|---|---|---|---|---|---|---|---|---|---|---|---|---|---|---|---|---|---|---|---|---|---|---|---|
| 2019 | Mike Harmon Racing | 74 | Chevy | DAY | ATL | LVS | PHO | CAL | TEX | BRI | RCH | TAL | DOV | CLT | POC | MCH | IOW | CHI | DAY | KEN | NHA | IOW | GLN | MOH; 30 | BRI | ROA | DAR | IND | LVS | RCH | CLT | DOV | KAN | TEX | PHO | HOM | 76th | 7 | |

^{*} Season still in progress
^{1} Ineligible for series points
