= 2019 NASCAR Xfinity Series =

American motorsport season

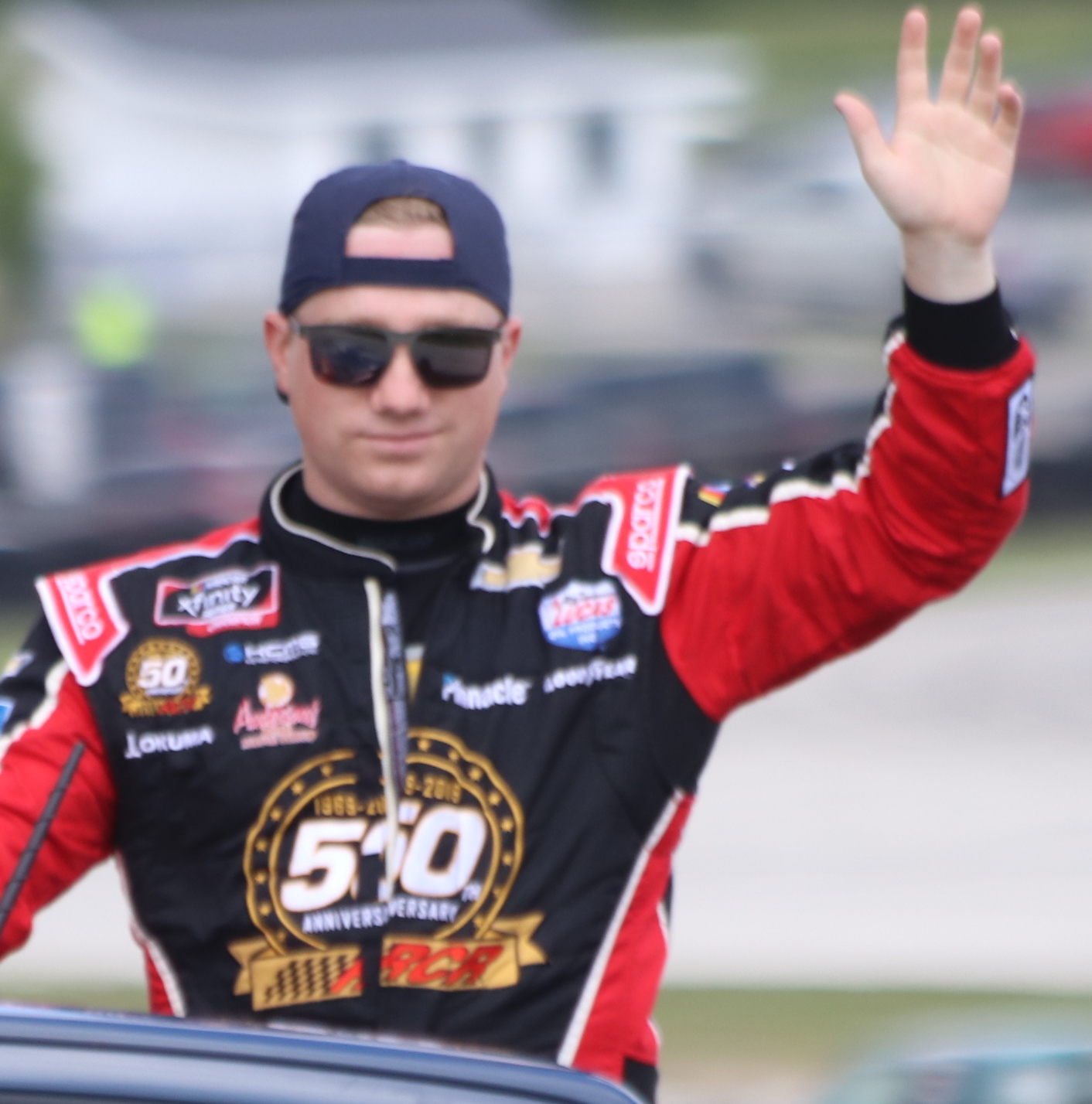
Tyler Reddick, the 2019 Xfinity Series and regular season champion.

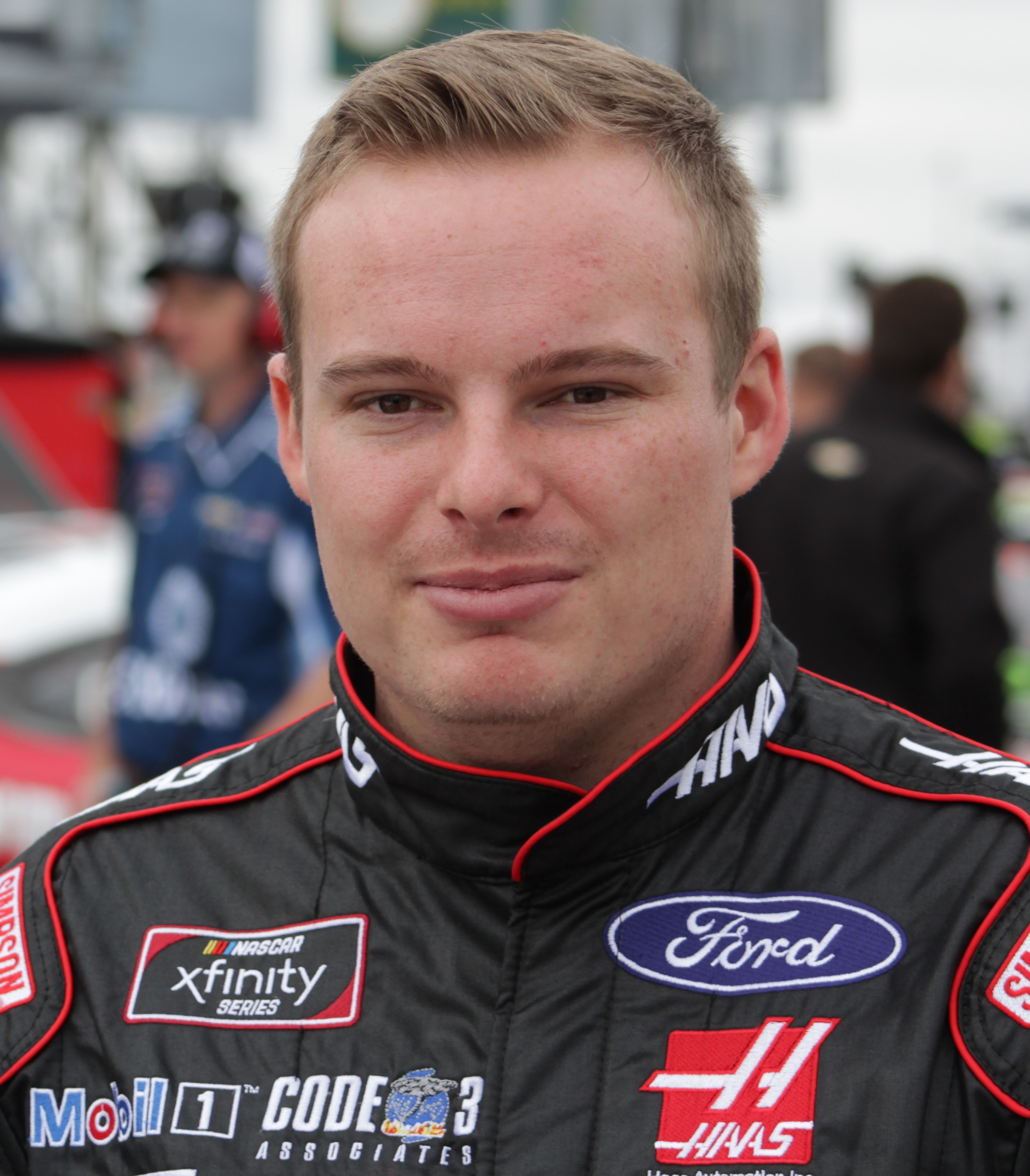
Cole Custer finished second behind Reddick in the championship.

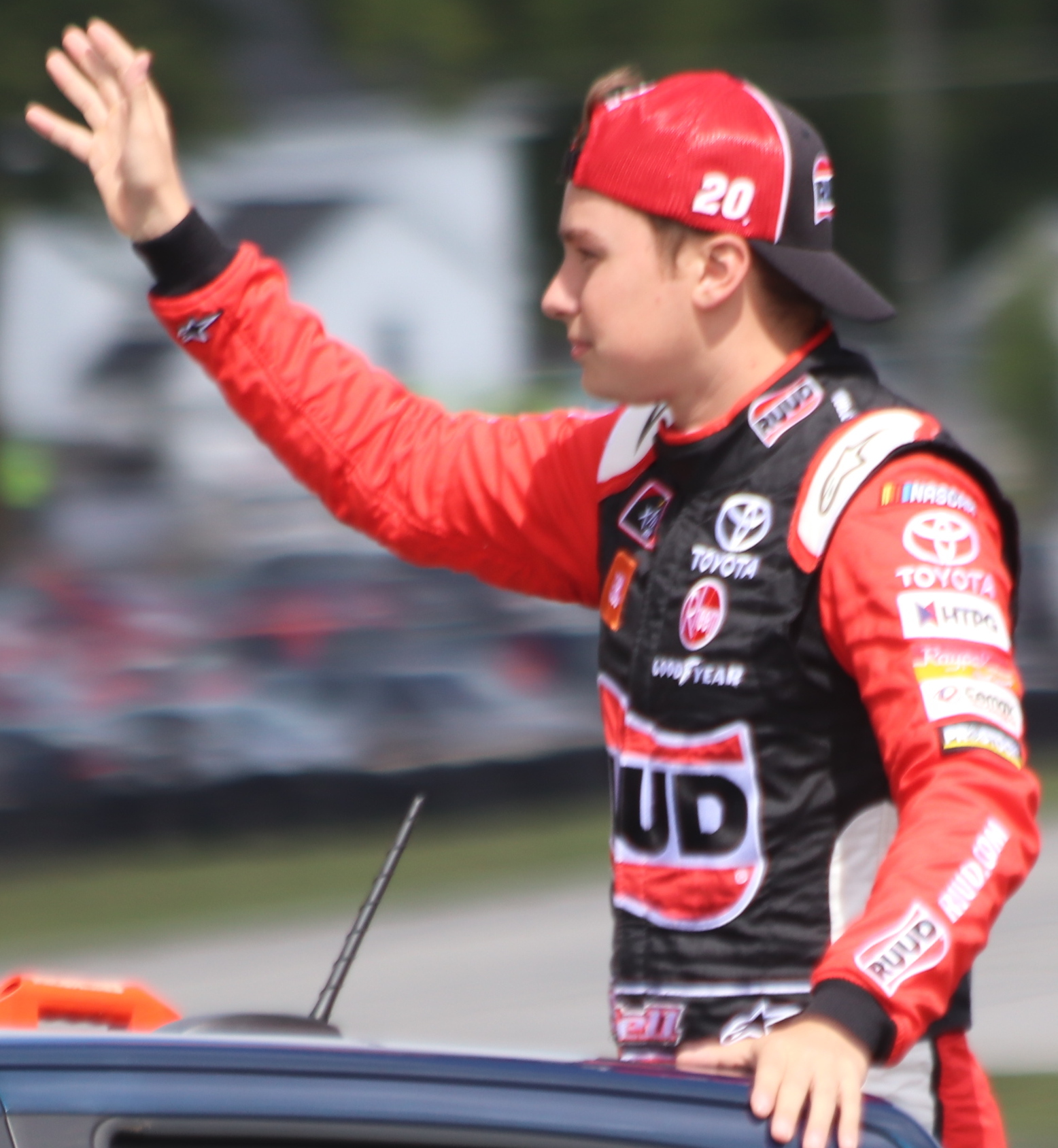
Christopher Bell finished third in the championship.

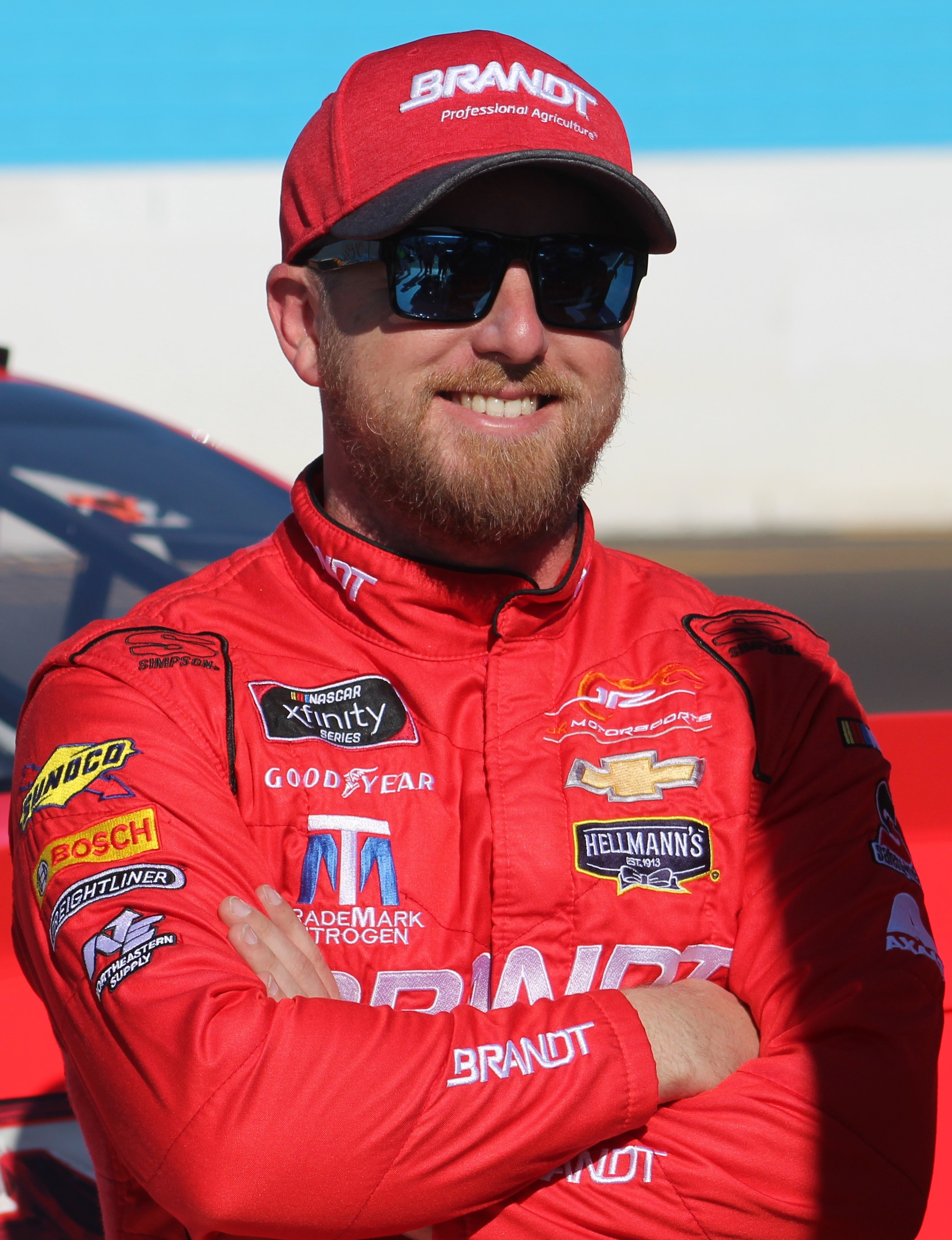
Justin Allgaier finished fourth in the championship.

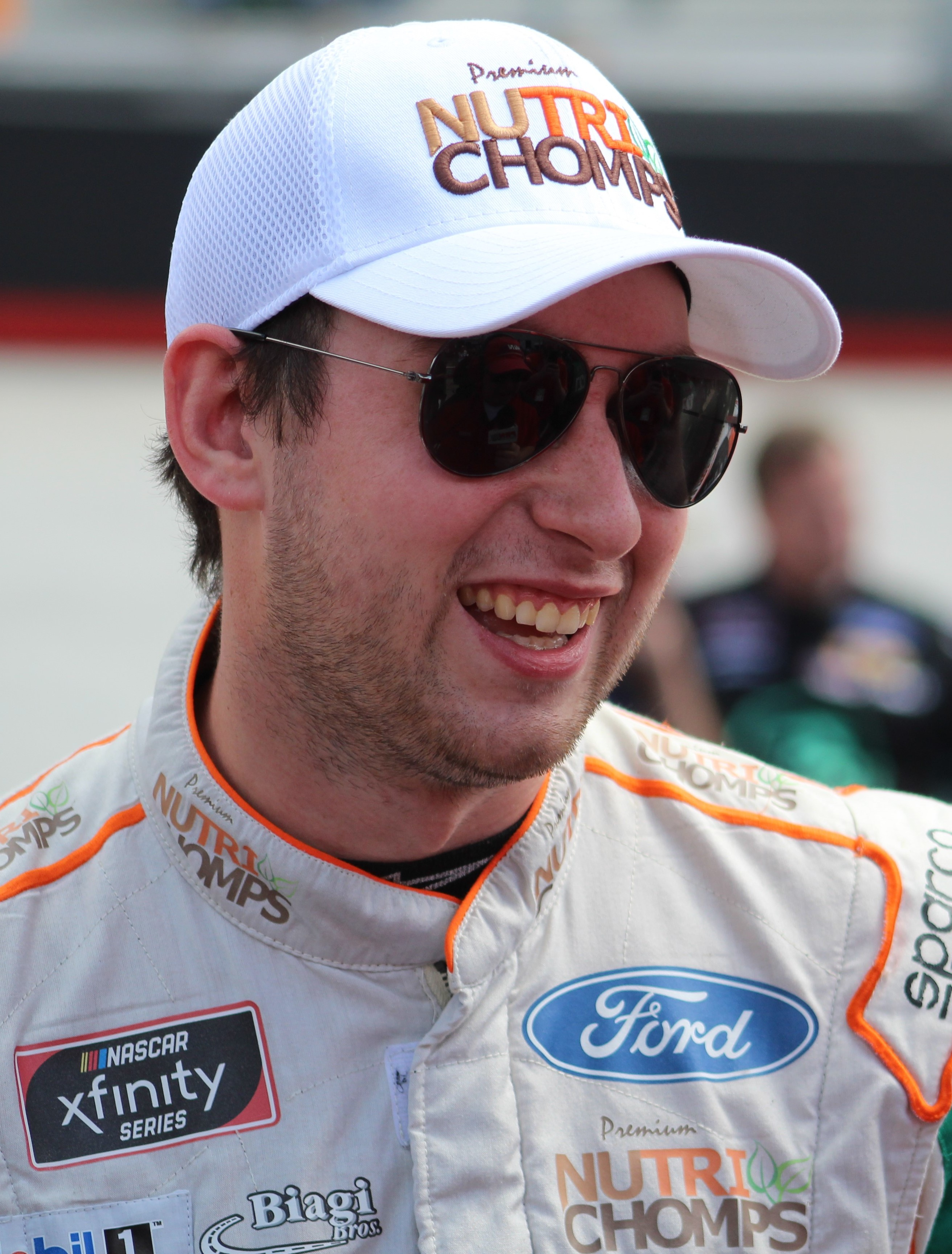
Chase Briscoe, the 2019 NASCAR Xfinity Series Rookie of the Year.

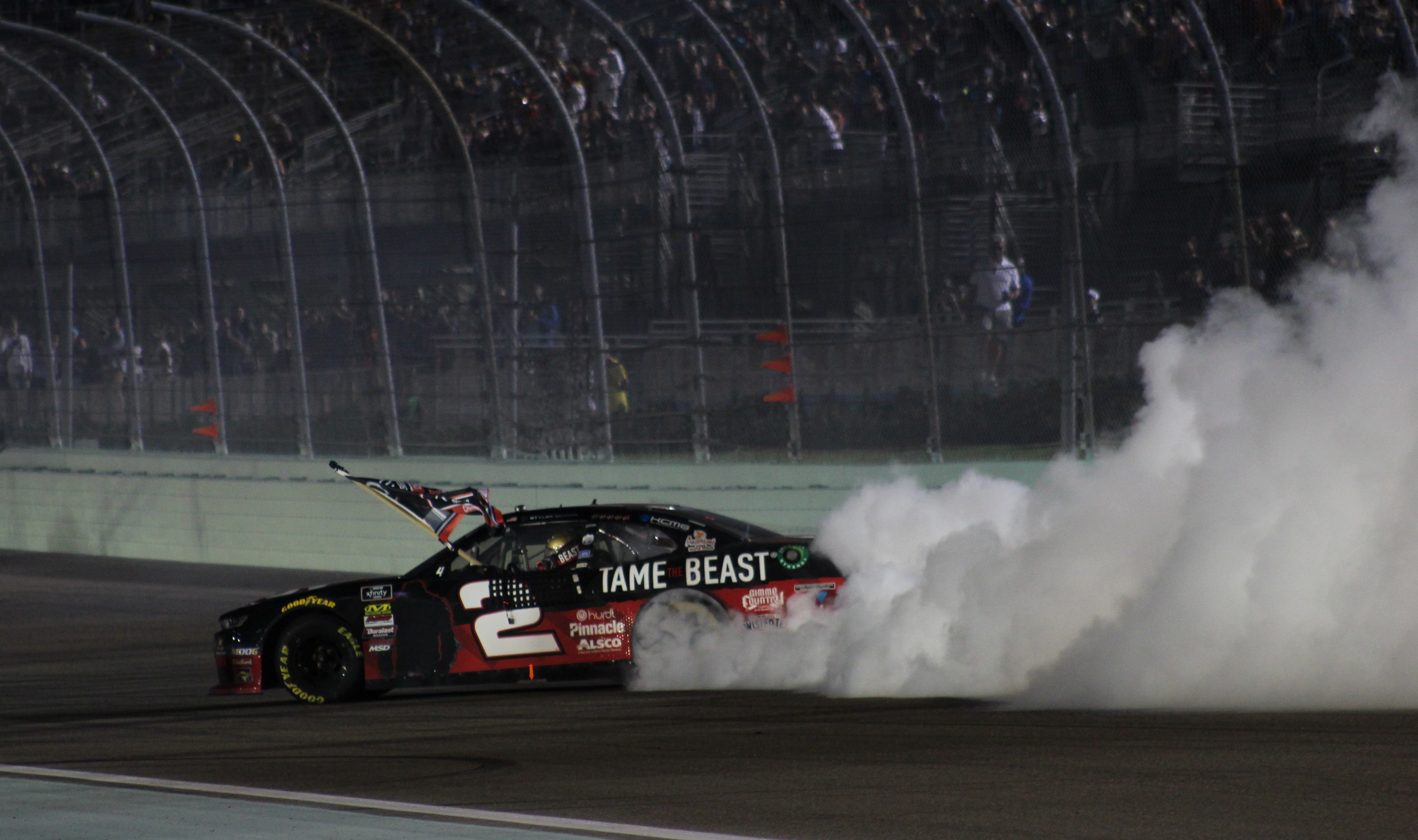
Chevrolet won the manufacturer's championship with 10 wins and 1191 points.

The 2019 NASCAR Xfinity Series was the 38th season of the NASCAR Xfinity Series, a stock car racing series sanctioned by NASCAR in the United States.

Tyler Reddick entered as the defending champion, and won his second championship over Cole Custer and Christopher Bell, who were known as "the big three" over the course of the season as they dominated the vast majority of the races. Reddick also clinched the 2019 Regular Series Championship following the 2019 Rhino Pro Truck Outfitters 300 at Las Vegas Motor Speedway. Reddick became the first back-to-back champion to drive for two different teams (JR Motorsports in 2018 and Richard Childress Racing in 2019).

The season marked the debut of the Toyota Supra, which replaced the Camry.

== Teams and drivers ==
=== Complete schedule ===
Manufacturer	Team	No.	Race driver	Crew chief
Chevrolet	Brandonbilt Motorsports	86	Brandon Brown (R) 28	Adam Brenner 18; Jeff Stankiewicz 1 Doug Randolph 14
Chevrolet	Brandonbilt Motorsports	86	Mason Diaz 2	Adam Brenner 18; Jeff Stankiewicz 1 Doug Randolph 14
Chevrolet	Brandonbilt Motorsports	86	Will Rodgers 3	Adam Brenner 18; Jeff Stankiewicz 1 Doug Randolph 14
Chevrolet	DGM Racing	36	Josh Williams 32	Mario Gosselin
Chevrolet	DGM Racing	36	Donald Theetge 1	Mario Gosselin
Chevrolet	DGM Racing	90	Caesar Bacarella 3	Shannon Rursch 20; Nathan Kennedy 11; Kevin Boykin 2
Chevrolet	DGM Racing	90	Alex Labbé 10	Shannon Rursch 20; Nathan Kennedy 11; Kevin Boykin 2
Chevrolet	DGM Racing	90	Donald Theetge 1	Shannon Rursch 20; Nathan Kennedy 11; Kevin Boykin 2
Chevrolet	DGM Racing	90	Ronnie Bassett Jr. 11	Shannon Rursch 20; Nathan Kennedy 11; Kevin Boykin 2
Chevrolet	DGM Racing	90	Dillon Bassett 6	Shannon Rursch 20; Nathan Kennedy 11; Kevin Boykin 2
Chevrolet	DGM Racing	90	Chris Dyson 1	Shannon Rursch 20; Nathan Kennedy 11; Kevin Boykin 2
Chevrolet	DGM Racing	90	Dexter Bean 1	Shannon Rursch 20; Nathan Kennedy 11; Kevin Boykin 2
Chevrolet	GMS Racing	23	John Hunter Nemechek (R)	Chad Norris
Chevrolet	JD Motorsports	0	Garrett Smithley 32	Bryan Berry
Chevrolet	JD Motorsports	0	Lawson Aschenbach 1	Bryan Berry
Chevrolet	JD Motorsports	01	Stephen Leicht 28	Mark Setzer
Chevrolet	JD Motorsports	01	Ryan Repko 3	Mark Setzer
Chevrolet	JD Motorsports	01	B. J. McLeod 1	Mark Setzer
Chevrolet	JD Motorsports	01	Landon Cassill 1	Mark Setzer
Chevrolet	JD Motorsports	4	Scott Lagasse Jr. 1	Paul Clapprood
Chevrolet	JD Motorsports	4	Ross Chastain 13	Paul Clapprood
Chevrolet	JD Motorsports	4	Landon Cassill 5	Paul Clapprood
Chevrolet	JD Motorsports	4	Stephen Leicht 4	Paul Clapprood
Chevrolet	JD Motorsports	4	B. J. McLeod 6	Paul Clapprood
Chevrolet	JD Motorsports	4	Lawson Aschenbach 1	Paul Clapprood
Chevrolet	JD Motorsports	4	Ryan Vargas 2	Paul Clapprood
Chevrolet	JD Motorsports	4	Garrett Smithley 1	Paul Clapprood
Chevrolet	JD Motorsports	15	B. J. McLeod 22	Ronald Drake 1 Wayne Carroll Jr. 32
Chevrolet	JD Motorsports	15	Tyler Matthews 7	Ronald Drake 1 Wayne Carroll Jr. 32
Chevrolet	JD Motorsports	15	Landon Cassill 1	Ronald Drake 1 Wayne Carroll Jr. 32
Chevrolet	JD Motorsports	15	Ryan Vargas 1	Ronald Drake 1 Wayne Carroll Jr. 32
Chevrolet	JD Motorsports	15	Stephen Leicht 1	Ronald Drake 1 Wayne Carroll Jr. 32
Chevrolet	JD Motorsports	15	Stefan Parsons 1	Ronald Drake 1 Wayne Carroll Jr. 32
Chevrolet	Jeremy Clements Racing	51	Jeremy Clements	Tony Clements 4 Danny Gill 1 Andrew Abbott 28
Chevrolet	Jimmy Means Racing	52	David Starr	Tim Brown
Chevrolet	JR Motorsports	1	Michael Annett	Travis Mack
Chevrolet	JR Motorsports	7	Justin Allgaier	Jason Burdett
Chevrolet	JR Motorsports	8	Chase Elliott 1	Taylor Moyer
Chevrolet	JR Motorsports	8	Ryan Preece 4	Taylor Moyer
Chevrolet	JR Motorsports	8	Zane Smith 10	Taylor Moyer
Chevrolet	JR Motorsports	8	Ryan Truex 6	Taylor Moyer
Chevrolet	JR Motorsports	8	Jeb Burton 7	Taylor Moyer
Chevrolet	JR Motorsports	8	Brett Moffitt 1	Taylor Moyer
Chevrolet	JR Motorsports	8	Sheldon Creed 1	Taylor Moyer
Chevrolet	JR Motorsports	8	Regan Smith 2	Taylor Moyer
Chevrolet	JR Motorsports	8	Dale Earnhardt Jr. 1	Taylor Moyer
Chevrolet	JR Motorsports	9	Noah Gragson (R)	Dave Elenz
Chevrolet	Kaulig Racing	11	Justin Haley (R)	Nick Harrison 18; Chris Rice / Alex Yontz 13 (Note: Alex Yontz is listed as crew chief on the official entry lists for Races 19 and 20, although the team officially stated that Rice was actually serving as crew chief those two weeks.); Lennie Chandler 2
Chevrolet	Mike Harmon Racing	74	Mike Harmon 19	Alan Collins Jr. 3 Timothy Goulet 12; Ed Jewett 18
Chevrolet	Mike Harmon Racing	74	Camden Murphy 3	Alan Collins Jr. 3 Timothy Goulet 12; Ed Jewett 18
Chevrolet	Mike Harmon Racing	74	Kyle Weatherman 3	Alan Collins Jr. 3 Timothy Goulet 12; Ed Jewett 18
Chevrolet	Mike Harmon Racing	74	Dan Corcoran 1	Alan Collins Jr. 3 Timothy Goulet 12; Ed Jewett 18
Chevrolet	Mike Harmon Racing	74	Aaron Quine 1	Alan Collins Jr. 3 Timothy Goulet 12; Ed Jewett 18
Chevrolet	Mike Harmon Racing	74	Tyler Matthews 2	Alan Collins Jr. 3 Timothy Goulet 12; Ed Jewett 18
Chevrolet	Mike Harmon Racing	74	Nicolas Hammann 1	Alan Collins Jr. 3 Timothy Goulet 12; Ed Jewett 18
Chevrolet	Mike Harmon Racing	74	Joe Nemechek 2	Alan Collins Jr. 3 Timothy Goulet 12; Ed Jewett 18
Chevrolet	Mike Harmon Racing	74	Bayley Currey 1	Alan Collins Jr. 3 Timothy Goulet 12; Ed Jewett 18
Chevrolet	Richard Childress Racing	2	Tyler Reddick	Randall Burnett
Chevrolet	RSS Racing	38	Josh Bilicki 3	Kevin Starland 3 Clifford Turner 11; Kevin Johnson 15; Tony Wilson 3 Sean Kenyon 1
Chevrolet	RSS Racing	38	Jeff Green 15	Kevin Starland 3 Clifford Turner 11; Kevin Johnson 15; Tony Wilson 3 Sean Kenyon 1
Chevrolet	RSS Racing	38	J. J. Yeley 11	Kevin Starland 3 Clifford Turner 11; Kevin Johnson 15; Tony Wilson 3 Sean Kenyon 1
Chevrolet	RSS Racing	38	Camden Murphy 1	Kevin Starland 3 Clifford Turner 11; Kevin Johnson 15; Tony Wilson 3 Sean Kenyon 1
Chevrolet	RSS Racing	38	C. J. McLaughlin 1	Kevin Starland 3 Clifford Turner 11; Kevin Johnson 15; Tony Wilson 3 Sean Kenyon 1
Chevrolet	RSS Racing	38	Bayley Currey 2	Kevin Starland 3 Clifford Turner 11; Kevin Johnson 15; Tony Wilson 3 Sean Kenyon 1
Chevrolet	RSS Racing	39	Ryan Sieg 32	Shane Wilson 32; Clinton Cram 1
Chevrolet	RSS Racing	39	C. J. McLaughlin 1	Shane Wilson 32; Clinton Cram 1
Chevrolet	RSS Racing	93	Jeff Green 2	Clifford Turner 2 Tony Wilson 11; Kevin Starland 1 Kevin Johnson 4 Shane Wilson 1 Clinton Cram 14
Chevrolet	RSS Racing	93	Josh Bilicki 18	Clifford Turner 2 Tony Wilson 11; Kevin Starland 1 Kevin Johnson 4 Shane Wilson 1 Clinton Cram 14
Chevrolet	RSS Racing	93	Brandon Brown (R) 1	Clifford Turner 2 Tony Wilson 11; Kevin Starland 1 Kevin Johnson 4 Shane Wilson 1 Clinton Cram 14
Chevrolet	RSS Racing	93	Scott Lagasse Jr. 1	Clifford Turner 2 Tony Wilson 11; Kevin Starland 1 Kevin Johnson 4 Shane Wilson 1 Clinton Cram 14
Chevrolet	RSS Racing	93	Ryan Sieg 1	Clifford Turner 2 Tony Wilson 11; Kevin Starland 1 Kevin Johnson 4 Shane Wilson 1 Clinton Cram 14
Chevrolet	RSS Racing	93	Camden Murphy 2	Clifford Turner 2 Tony Wilson 11; Kevin Starland 1 Kevin Johnson 4 Shane Wilson 1 Clinton Cram 14
Chevrolet	RSS Racing	93	J. J. Yeley 2	Clifford Turner 2 Tony Wilson 11; Kevin Starland 1 Kevin Johnson 4 Shane Wilson 1 Clinton Cram 14
Chevrolet	RSS Racing	93	C. J. McLaughlin 4	Clifford Turner 2 Tony Wilson 11; Kevin Starland 1 Kevin Johnson 4 Shane Wilson 1 Clinton Cram 14
Chevrolet	RSS Racing	93	Hermie Sadler 1	Clifford Turner 2 Tony Wilson 11; Kevin Starland 1 Kevin Johnson 4 Shane Wilson 1 Clinton Cram 14
Chevrolet	RSS Racing	93	Bayley Currey 1	Clifford Turner 2 Tony Wilson 11; Kevin Starland 1 Kevin Johnson 4 Shane Wilson 1 Clinton Cram 14
Chevrolet	SS-Green Light Racing	07	Ray Black Jr.	Jason Miller
Chevrolet	SS-Green Light Racing	08	Gray Gaulding	Patrick Donahue
Ford	Stewart–Haas Racing with Biagi–DenBeste	00	Cole Custer	Mike Shiplett
Ford	Stewart–Haas Racing with Biagi–DenBeste	98	Chase Briscoe (R)	Richard Boswell
Ford	Team Penske	22	Austin Cindric	Brian Wilson 32; Jefferson Hodges 1
Toyota	Joe Gibbs Racing	18	Jeffrey Earnhardt 5	Ben Beshore
Toyota	Joe Gibbs Racing	18	Kyle Busch 7	Ben Beshore
Toyota	Joe Gibbs Racing	18	Harrison Burton 9	Ben Beshore
Toyota	Joe Gibbs Racing	18	Riley Herbst 9	Ben Beshore
Toyota	Joe Gibbs Racing	18	Jack Hawksworth 1	Ben Beshore
Toyota	Joe Gibbs Racing	18	Matt DiBenedetto 1	Ben Beshore
Toyota	Joe Gibbs Racing	18	Denny Hamlin 1	Ben Beshore
Toyota	Joe Gibbs Racing	19	Brandon Jones	Jeff Meendering
Toyota	Joe Gibbs Racing	20	Christopher Bell	Jason Ratcliff
Toyota	MBM Motorsports	13	Max Tullman 1	Doug Richert 1 Sebastian Laforge 27; Brian Keselowski 1 Thomas Bear 3 Tim Goulet 1
Toyota	MBM Motorsports	13	John Jackson 6	Doug Richert 1 Sebastian Laforge 27; Brian Keselowski 1 Thomas Bear 3 Tim Goulet 1
Toyota	MBM Motorsports	13	Stan Mullis 4	Doug Richert 1 Sebastian Laforge 27; Brian Keselowski 1 Thomas Bear 3 Tim Goulet 1
Toyota	MBM Motorsports	13	Timmy Hill 8	Doug Richert 1 Sebastian Laforge 27; Brian Keselowski 1 Thomas Bear 3 Tim Goulet 1
Toyota	MBM Motorsports	13	Chad Finchum 7	Doug Richert 1 Sebastian Laforge 27; Brian Keselowski 1 Thomas Bear 3 Tim Goulet 1
Toyota	MBM Motorsports	13	Joe Nemechek 3	Doug Richert 1 Sebastian Laforge 27; Brian Keselowski 1 Thomas Bear 3 Tim Goulet 1
Toyota	MBM Motorsports	13	Carl Long 2	Doug Richert 1 Sebastian Laforge 27; Brian Keselowski 1 Thomas Bear 3 Tim Goulet 1
Toyota	MBM Motorsports	13	Tommy Joe Martins 2	Doug Richert 1 Sebastian Laforge 27; Brian Keselowski 1 Thomas Bear 3 Tim Goulet 1
Toyota	MBM Motorsports	35	Joey Gase	Ryan Bell 23; Clinton Cram 1 Doug Richert 9
Toyota	MBM Motorsports	61	John Jackson 1	Brian Keselowski 14; Doug Richert 10; George Church 4 Daniel Johnson 5
Toyota	MBM Motorsports	61	Chad Finchum 23	Brian Keselowski 14; Doug Richert 10; George Church 4 Daniel Johnson 5
Toyota	MBM Motorsports	61	Max Tullman 1	Brian Keselowski 14; Doug Richert 10; George Church 4 Daniel Johnson 5
Toyota	MBM Motorsports	61	Stanton Barrett 1	Brian Keselowski 14; Doug Richert 10; George Church 4 Daniel Johnson 5
Toyota	MBM Motorsports	61	Timmy Hill 2 (Note: Timmy Hill's entry at Bristol in August was fielded in a collaboration with Hattori Racing Enterprises.)	Brian Keselowski 14; Doug Richert 10; George Church 4 Daniel Johnson 5
Toyota	MBM Motorsports	61	Dick Karth 1	Brian Keselowski 14; Doug Richert 10; George Church 4 Daniel Johnson 5
Toyota	MBM Motorsports	61	Austin Hill 1 (Note: Austin Hill's entry at Indianapolis was fielded in a collaboration with Hattori Racing Enterprises.)	Brian Keselowski 14; Doug Richert 10; George Church 4 Daniel Johnson 5
Toyota	MBM Motorsports	61	Tommy Joe Martins 3	Brian Keselowski 14; Doug Richert 10; George Church 4 Daniel Johnson 5
Toyota	MBM Motorsports	66	Timmy Hill 16	Clinton Cram 13; Mark Labretone 1 Ryan Bell 3 George Church 9 Doug Richert 7
Toyota	MBM Motorsports	66	Tyler Hill 3	Clinton Cram 13; Mark Labretone 1 Ryan Bell 3 George Church 9 Doug Richert 7
Toyota	MBM Motorsports	66	Colin Garrett 1	Clinton Cram 13; Mark Labretone 1 Ryan Bell 3 George Church 9 Doug Richert 7
Toyota	MBM Motorsports	66	Stan Mullis 2	Clinton Cram 13; Mark Labretone 1 Ryan Bell 3 George Church 9 Doug Richert 7
Toyota	MBM Motorsports	66	Tommy Joe Martins 4	Clinton Cram 13; Mark Labretone 1 Ryan Bell 3 George Church 9 Doug Richert 7
Toyota	MBM Motorsports	66	Chad Finchum 2	Clinton Cram 13; Mark Labretone 1 Ryan Bell 3 George Church 9 Doug Richert 7
Toyota	MBM Motorsports	66	Mike Marlar 1	Clinton Cram 13; Mark Labretone 1 Ryan Bell 3 George Church 9 Doug Richert 7
Toyota	MBM Motorsports	66	Bobby Dale Earnhardt 4	Clinton Cram 13; Mark Labretone 1 Ryan Bell 3 George Church 9 Doug Richert 7
Chevrolet 28 Toyota 5	B. J. McLeod Motorsports	5	Matt Mills 25	David Ingram Jr. 26; Keith Wolfe 7
Chevrolet 28 Toyota 5	B. J. McLeod Motorsports	5	Scott Heckert 1	David Ingram Jr. 26; Keith Wolfe 7
Chevrolet 28 Toyota 5	B. J. McLeod Motorsports	5	Vinnie Miller 7	David Ingram Jr. 26; Keith Wolfe 7
Chevrolet 26 Toyota 7	B. J. McLeod Motorsports	78	Vinnie Miller 26	Keith Wolfe 26; David Ingram Jr. 5 Adam Brooks 2
Chevrolet 26 Toyota 7	B. J. McLeod Motorsports	78	Scott Heckert 1	Keith Wolfe 26; David Ingram Jr. 5 Adam Brooks 2
Chevrolet 26 Toyota 7	B. J. McLeod Motorsports	78	Ryan Ellis 1	Keith Wolfe 26; David Ingram Jr. 5 Adam Brooks 2
Chevrolet 26 Toyota 7	B. J. McLeod Motorsports	78	J. J. Yeley 2	Keith Wolfe 26; David Ingram Jr. 5 Adam Brooks 2
Chevrolet 26 Toyota 7	B. J. McLeod Motorsports	78	Matt Mills 3	Keith Wolfe 26; David Ingram Jr. 5 Adam Brooks 2
Chevrolet 10 Toyota 23	B. J. McLeod Motorsports	99	D. J. Kennington 1	Kevyn Rebolledo 13; Adam Brooks 18; David Ingram Jr. 2
Chevrolet 10 Toyota 23	B. J. McLeod Motorsports	99	Tommy Joe Martins 9	Kevyn Rebolledo 13; Adam Brooks 18; David Ingram Jr. 2
Chevrolet 10 Toyota 23	B. J. McLeod Motorsports	99	Jairo Avila Jr. 5	Kevyn Rebolledo 13; Adam Brooks 18; David Ingram Jr. 2
Chevrolet 10 Toyota 23	B. J. McLeod Motorsports	99	B. J. McLeod 1	Kevyn Rebolledo 13; Adam Brooks 18; David Ingram Jr. 2
Chevrolet 10 Toyota 23	B. J. McLeod Motorsports	99	Cody Ware 3	Kevyn Rebolledo 13; Adam Brooks 18; David Ingram Jr. 2
Chevrolet 10 Toyota 23	B. J. McLeod Motorsports	99	Todd Peck 1	Kevyn Rebolledo 13; Adam Brooks 18; David Ingram Jr. 2
Chevrolet 10 Toyota 23	B. J. McLeod Motorsports	99	Ryan Ellis 1	Kevyn Rebolledo 13; Adam Brooks 18; David Ingram Jr. 2
Chevrolet 10 Toyota 23	B. J. McLeod Motorsports	99	Stefan Parsons 5	Kevyn Rebolledo 13; Adam Brooks 18; David Ingram Jr. 2
Chevrolet 10 Toyota 23	B. J. McLeod Motorsports	99	Patrick Gallagher 1	Kevyn Rebolledo 13; Adam Brooks 18; David Ingram Jr. 2
Chevrolet 10 Toyota 23	B. J. McLeod Motorsports	99	C. J. McLaughlin 1	Kevyn Rebolledo 13; Adam Brooks 18; David Ingram Jr. 2
Chevrolet 10 Toyota 23	B. J. McLeod Motorsports	99	Loris Hezemans 1	Kevyn Rebolledo 13; Adam Brooks 18; David Ingram Jr. 2
Chevrolet 10 Toyota 23	B. J. McLeod Motorsports	99	Matt Mills 1	Kevyn Rebolledo 13; Adam Brooks 18; David Ingram Jr. 2
Chevrolet 10 Toyota 23	B. J. McLeod Motorsports	99	Josh Bilicki 3	Kevyn Rebolledo 13; Adam Brooks 18; David Ingram Jr. 2

=== Limited schedule ===
Manufacturer	Team	No.	Race driver	Crew chief	Rounds
Chevrolet	ACG Motorsports	25	Chris Cockrum	Jeff Spraker	1
Chevrolet	ACG Motorsports	17	Chris Cockrum	Jeff Spraker	2 (Note: Entries were fielded by ACG Motorsports in a collaboration with Rick Ware Racing.)
Chevrolet	Rick Ware Racing (Note: Since the race at Charlotte in May, Mike Harmon Racing and Rick Ware Racing have jointly fielded the No. 17 car.)	17	Bayley Currey	R. B. Bracken	10
Chevrolet	Rick Ware Racing	17	Kyle Weatherman	R. B. Bracken	4
Chevrolet	Rick Ware Racing	17	Camden Murphy	R. B. Bracken	2
Chevrolet	Rick Ware Racing	17	Josh Bilicki	R. B. Bracken	1
Chevrolet	Rick Ware Racing	17	Mark Meunier	R. B. Bracken	1
Chevrolet	Rick Ware Racing	17	Joe Nemechek	R. B. Bracken	6
Chevrolet	Rick Ware Racing	17	Robby Lyons	R. B. Bracken	1
Chevrolet	Brandonbilt Motorsports	68	Brandon Brown (R)	Jeff Stankiewicz 1 Brian Keselowski 4 Jordan Irving 1 Lance Elliott 1	4
Chevrolet	Brandonbilt Motorsports	68	Dillon Bassett	Jeff Stankiewicz 1 Brian Keselowski 4 Jordan Irving 1 Lance Elliott 1	1
Chevrolet	Brandonbilt Motorsports	68	Will Rodgers	Jeff Stankiewicz 1 Brian Keselowski 4 Jordan Irving 1 Lance Elliott 1	1
Chevrolet	Brandonbilt Motorsports	68	Mason Diaz	Jeff Stankiewicz 1 Brian Keselowski 4 Jordan Irving 1 Lance Elliott 1	1
Chevrolet	DGM Racing	92	Josh Williams	Shannon Rursch 1 Nathan Kennedy 2 Kevin Boykin 1	1
Chevrolet	DGM Racing	92	Ronnie Bassett Jr.	Shannon Rursch 1 Nathan Kennedy 2 Kevin Boykin 1	1
Chevrolet	DGM Racing	92	Dillon Bassett	Shannon Rursch 1 Nathan Kennedy 2 Kevin Boykin 1	1
Chevrolet	DGM Racing	92	Dexter Bean	Shannon Rursch 1 Nathan Kennedy 2 Kevin Boykin 1	1
Chevrolet	Jimmy Means Racing	53	Max Tullman	Kevin Hall	1
Chevrolet	Jimmy Means Racing	53	Kyle Weatherman	Kevin Hall	1
Chevrolet	Kaulig Racing	10	Austin Dillon	Alex Yontz 9 Chad Kendrick 2 Justin Alexander 1 Lennie Chandler 1 Chris Rice 2 (Note: Although Lennie Chandler is listed as the crew chief for the No. 10 on the entry list for the race at Las Vegas in September, Kaulig Racing said in a statement that Chris Rice would be the team's crew chief that weekend. At the Charlotte Roval, when the team won the race, Chandler was again listed on the entry list as crew chief, but as per the interview of Rice on the TV broadcast, Rice was again the actual crew chief.); Byron Daley 2	4
Chevrolet	Kaulig Racing	10	Elliott Sadler	Alex Yontz 9 Chad Kendrick 2 Justin Alexander 1 Lennie Chandler 1 Chris Rice 2 Byron Daley 2	2
Chevrolet	Kaulig Racing	10	A. J. Allmendinger	Alex Yontz 9 Chad Kendrick 2 Justin Alexander 1 Lennie Chandler 1 Chris Rice 2 Byron Daley 2	5
Chevrolet	Kaulig Racing	10	Joe Graf Jr. (Note: Entry was fielded in a collaboration with Richard Childress Racing.)	Alex Yontz 9 Chad Kendrick 2 Justin Alexander 1 Lennie Chandler 1 Chris Rice 2 Byron Daley 2	1
Chevrolet	Kaulig Racing	10	Ross Chastain	Alex Yontz 9 Chad Kendrick 2 Justin Alexander 1 Lennie Chandler 1 Chris Rice 2 Byron Daley 2	5
Chevrolet	Kaulig Racing	16	Ross Chastain	Alex Yontz	1
Chevrolet	Pardus Racing Inc.	43	Preston Pardus	Tony Furr	2
Chevrolet	Richard Childress Racing	21	Kaz Grala	Justin Alexander 8 Andy Street 1	5
Chevrolet	Richard Childress Racing	21	Joe Graf Jr.	Justin Alexander 8 Andy Street 1	4
Chevrolet	Shepherd Racing Ventures	89	Morgan Shepherd	Nick Hoechst 7 Kase Kallenbach 19	16
Chevrolet	Shepherd Racing Ventures	89	Landon Cassill	Nick Hoechst 7 Kase Kallenbach 19	10
Ford	Team Penske	12	Brad Keselowski	Matt Swiderski	2
Ford	Team Penske	12	Paul Menard	Matt Swiderski	2
Ford	Team Penske	12	Joey Logano	Matt Swiderski	2
Ford	Team Penske	12	Ryan Blaney	Matt Swiderski	2
Toyota	H2 Motorsports	28	Shane Lee	Pete Rondeau	7
Toyota	Hattori Racing Enterprises (Note: The team's entries at Bristol in August with Timmy Hill as well as Indianapolis with Austin Hill were fielded in a collaboration with MBM Motorsports, and the MBM No. 42 car was renumbered to Hattori's No. 61.)	61	Austin Hill	Scott Zipadelli	1
Toyota	Sam Hunt Racing	26	Colin Garrett	Brian Keselowski	1
Toyota	XCI Racing	81	Jeffrey Earnhardt	Matthew Lucas	2
Toyota	XCI Racing	81	Erik Jones	Matthew Lucas	1

== Changes ==
=== Teams ===
- On September 21, 2018, Brandonbilt Motorsports announced they would run the No. 86 car full-time for three part-time drivers. The only one announced at the time was Brandon Brown.
- On October 15, 2018, it was announced that longtime sponsor Lilly Diabetes will be pulling out of NASCAR, leaving the Roush Fenway Racing No. 16 car unsponsored for 2019. On December 2, 2018, Ty Majeski said that RFR will not have an Xfinity program in 2019.
- On November 17, 2018, Stewart–Haas Racing announced that they would run a second full time car in 2019. On November 27, 2018, Chase Briscoe was announced as the driver of the No. 98 Ford.
- On December 21, 2018, Rick Ware Racing announced that they will field the No. 25 car full-time in 2019, beginning at Daytona in February. However, they showed up to Daytona with No. 17 and used that number instead.
- On January 4, 2019, Chip Ganassi Racing suspended operations in the Xfinity Series due to a lack of sponsorship. The shutdown was announced after the home of the CEO of DC Solar, the team's primary sponsor, was raided by the FBI on December 18, 2018.
- On January 10, 2019, B. J. McLeod Motorsports announced they will field the Nos. 5, 78, and 99 full-time in 2019.
- On January 25, 2019, JR Motorsports announced that for the 2019 season, Michael Annett would transfer from the No. 5 to the No. 1 while Noah Gragson would drive the No. 9 car full-time and the No. 8 car would be driven by Zane Smith, Brett Moffitt, Ryan Preece, Ryan Truex, Jeb Burton, Chase Elliott, Dale Earnhardt Jr., Sheldon Creed and Regan Smith.
- On February 14, 2019, Xtreme Concepts Inc. announced that it has formed XCI Racing and will field the No. 81 Toyota at Chicagoland, Daytona, Bristol, and Darlington. The team has a technical alliance with Joe Gibbs Racing.
- In March 2019, it was confirmed that RSS Racing switched from Pro Motor Engines to Richard Childress Racing for their Chevrolet-based engines and chassis at the beginning of the season.
- On May 23, 2019, Matt Hurley created H2 Motorsports, fielding the No. 28 Toyota starting at Iowa in June for Shane Lee, with the intention of running the remainder of the Xfinity schedule. The team ended up skipping the three road course races of Watkins Glen, Mid-Ohio, and Road America and then again at Darlington, but ran the remainder of the schedule. Lee was later released as driver and the team withdrew before the race at Darlington.
- On May 30, 2019, it was reported that Hattori Racing Enterprises will field the No. 61 Toyota at the July Daytona race, marking the team's first Xfinity race since 2015. but failed to qualify.
- On August 23, 2019, it was announced that Preston Pardus, the son of former NASCAR driver Dan Pardus, would make his series debut at Road America with his own team, which was formed after purchasing a road course car from the closed Chip Ganassi Racing No. 42 team. Jayski.com also says the team plans to run at the Charlotte Roval in September.

=== Drivers ===
- On August 15, 2018, Elliott Sadler announced his retirement from full-time competition, thus leaving the JR Motorsports No. 1 team open. It was announced on September 25 that Noah Gragson would replace Sadler, driving the No. 1 Chevrolet Camaro SS full time in 2019. On January 25, 2019, it was announced that Gragson would be driving the No. 9 car full-time in 2019.
- On September 22, 2018, B. J. McLeod Motorsports announced that Vinnie Miller would run the No. 78 with them full-time in 2019, and also run the final six races of the 2018 season with the team after securing his release from JD Motorsports.
- On October 15, 2018, Ryan Reed announced that, due to his sponsor Lilly Diabetes leaving the team, he would not return to the No. 16 Roush Fenway Racing Ford Mustang GT in 2019, leaving him a free agent.
- On October 19, 2018, Spencer Gallagher announced that he would be retiring from racing at the end of the 2018 season and would take on a managerial role at GMS Racing. On December 6, 2018, it was announced that John Hunter Nemechek would replace Gallagher in the No. 23 Chevrolet.
- On October 29, 2018, it was announced that Gray Gaulding will drive for SS-Green Light Racing full-time in the No. 08 car.
- On October 31, 2018, it was announced that 2018 NASCAR Xfinity Series Champion Tyler Reddick will move from JR Motorsports to Richard Childress Racing in the 2019 season. During RCR's 50th anniversary press conference on December 14, 2018, it was announced that Reddick will be the organization's only full-time Xfinity Series driver in 2019.
- On October 31, 2018, Dale Earnhardt Jr. tweeted, saying that he is working towards running the Darlington race in the 2019 NASCAR Xfinity Series. He had also tweeted a partial photo of a car a few weeks prior. *On February 1, 2019, Earnhardt Jr. confirmed that he will race at the Sport Clips Haircuts VFW 200 at Darlington Raceway on August 31.
- On November 8, 2018, it was announced that Austin Cindric would drive the No. 22 Team Penske Ford for the entire 2019 season. The No. 12 Team Penske Ford will run on a part-time basis with Monster Energy NASCAR Cup Series drivers Brad Keselowski, Joey Logano, Ryan Blaney, and Paul Menard.
- On November 9, 2018, it was announced that Ross Chastain would join Chip Ganassi Racing to drive the No. 42 Chevrolet full-time in 2019. However, following an FBI raid on DC Solar's headquarters in December 2018, it was announced on January 4, 2019, that Chip Ganassi Racing would withdraw from the Xfinity series before the start of the 2019 season. Chastain solidified his plans on January 31, 2019, when he joined Kaulig Racing for three races in the organization's No. 10 car and went back to his old ride at JD Motorsports for the other 30 races on the schedule. However, beginning with the race at Michigan International Speedway in June, Chastain would no longer be earning points towards the championship, as he declared over the week to shift to running for the NASCAR Gander Outdoors Truck Series title instead.
- On November 10, 2018, it was announced that Jeffrey Earnhardt would join Joe Gibbs Racing to drive the No. 18 Toyota Supra for nine races in 2019, including the season opener at Daytona. On February 14, 2019, XCI Racing announced that Earnhardt will drive the No. 81 Toyota for four races in 2019. On August 7, Earnhardt announced that he parted ways with sponsor and XCI affiliate iK9, as well as JGR, after five of the planned nine races. On August 12, 2019, Erik Jones was announced to drive the No. 81 at the Bristol night race.
- On November 25, 2018, Morgan Shepherd announced that he will be back in 2019.
- On November 29, 2018, it was announced that Chase Briscoe would join Stewart–Haas Racing with Biagi–DenBeste to drive the No. 98 Ford full-time in 2019, while also competing for Rookie of the Year honors. In 2018, Briscoe drove a part-time schedule in the Xfinity Series, splitting time between the No. 98 and the No. 60 Roush Fenway Racing Ford. With Briscoe taking over the 98 it marked the first time since 1998 that Kevin Harvick did not start a Xfinity Series race.
- On December 1, 2018, it was announced that Justin Haley would join Kaulig Racing to replace Ryan Truex in the No. 11 Chevrolet. Haley will also compete for Rookie of the Year Honors. Truex has since moved to a part time ride in the No. 8 for JR Motorsports. In 2018, Haley drove the No. 24 GMS Racing Chevrolet Silverado in the NASCAR Camping World Truck Series while also making a few starts in the Xfinity series.
- On December 2, 2018, Ty Majeski announced that he will be returning to Super Late Model racing in 2019 after it was revealed that Roush Fenway Racing will shut down its Xfinity program.
- On December 4, 2018, it was announced that Blake Koch would make his Xfinity series return by driving the JD Motorsports No. 4 Chevrolet full-time in 2019. On January 31, 2019, Koch announced that he would step away from racing to focus on his business Filter Time. Koch's seat was filled by Ross Chastain for the majority of the schedule.
- On December 18, 2018, it was announced that Zane Smith would join JR Motorsports for eight races in the organization's No. 9 car with additional drivers to be announced at a later date. Smith drove in the ARCA Racing Series in 2018, finishing 2nd in final points. On January 25, 2019, it was announced that Smith would share the new No. 8 Chevrolet with Brett Moffitt, Ryan Preece, Ryan Truex, Chase Elliott, Dale Earnhardt Jr., Sheldon Creed and Jeb Burton.
- On December 27, 2018, it was announced that Jeff Green and Ryan Sieg will return to RSS Racing full-time in 2019. On June 11, 2019, it was announced that Green will miss the second half of the Xfinity season to undergo rotator cuff surgery. He is expected to return in July as a crew chief for RSS Racing at Iowa.
- On January 10, 2019, it was announced that Matt Mills will run the No. 8 for B. J. McLeod Motorsports on a full-time basis. In addition to that announcement, B. J. McLeod, Tommy Joe Martins and Jairo Avila Jr. will share the No. 99 entry that will run full-time in 2019. On February 1, 2019, it was announced that after the No. 8 would be part of JR Motorsports, Mills would be driving the No. 5 car.
- On January 16, 2019, MBM Motorsports announced that Joey Gase will run the No. 35 Toyota full-time in the 2019 season.
- On February 4, 2019, it was announced that Josh Bilicki would move to RSS Racing in 2019 to drive the organization's No. 38 entry full-time. Bilicki drove full-time in 2018 for JP Motorsports.
- On February 28, 2019, it was announced that Elliott Sadler will return to the Xfinity Series part-time, driving the Kaulig Racing No. 10 Chevrolet at Richmond and Las Vegas.
- On March 21, 2019, it was announced that A. J. Allmendinger would return to NASCAR competition by driving the No. 10 Kaulig Racing entry at Daytona, Road America, Watkins Glen, Mid Ohio, and Charlotte. Allmendinger is set to make his final start at the Charlotte Roval.
- On June 16, 2019, it was announced that Austin Hill will make his Xfinity Series debut at the July Daytona race in the Hattori Racing Enterprises No. 61 Toyota.
- On July 27, 2019, Mark Meunier drove the Rick Ware Racing/Mike Harmon Racing No. 17 Chevrolet at Iowa, but ultimately failed to qualify for the race.
- On August 6, 2019, JD Motorsports announced that Lawson Aschenbach will drive the No. 4 Chevrolet at Mid-Ohio.
- On August 6, 2019, Brandonbilt Motorsports announced that Will Rodgers will drive the No. 86 Chevrolet at Mid-Ohio and the Charlotte Roval. Rodgers made his debut at the July Iowa race.
- On August 7, 2019, Joe Gibbs Racing announced that Jack Hawksworth will drive the No. 18 Toyota at Mid-Ohio.
- On August 13, 2019, Matt DiBenedetto announced that he will drive the Joe Gibbs Racing No. 18 Toyota at Road America.
- On August 15, 2019, Bayley Currey was indefinitely suspended for violating NASCAR's Substance Abuse Policy. He was set to drive the RWR/Harmon No. 17 at the Bristol Night Race. Hours later, reporter Chris Knight tweeted that Kyle Weatherman would be his substitute replacement for that race, although team co-owner Mike Harmon said on Facebook the next day that Joe Nemechek would be subbing in the No. 17 instead. On September 18, Currey was reinstated by NASCAR after he successfully completed his Road to Recovery Program.
- On August 19, 2019, it was announced that Dexter Bean will drive the DGM Racing No. 90 Chevrolet at Road America.
- On August 28, 2019, RSS Racing announced that Camden Murphy will drive the No. 93 Chevrolet at Darlington.

=== Crew chiefs ===
- On October 10, 2018, Hendrick Motorsports announced that Kevin Meendering from the No. 1 JR Motorsports team will replace Chad Knaus as Jimmie Johnson's crew chief in the Monster Energy NASCAR Cup Series (MENCS) in 2019.
- On November 17, 2018, it was announced that two-time defending series champion crew chief Dave Elenz will move to the No. 1 JR Motorsports Chevrolet with rookie Noah Gragson in 2019. On January 7, 2019, it was announced that his replacement for the No. 9 team will be Taylor Moyer. On January 25, 2019, it was announced that Dave Elenz will be the crew chief for the No. 9 Chevrolet with Noah Gragson while Taylor Moyer will be the crew chief for the No. 8 JR Motorsports Chevrolet.
- On December 6, 2018, Joe Gibbs Racing announced that Jeff Meendering will replace Chris Gabehart as crew chief of the No. 19 Toyota, as Gabehart has been promoted to Denny Hamlin's crew chief in the MENCS. Ben Beshore replaces Eric Phillips as crew chief of the No. 18 team, as Phillips moves to the MENCS as the No. 11 car chief.
- On December 14, 2018, Richard Childress Racing announced that Randall Burnett will be Tyler Reddick's crew chief in the No. 2 Chevrolet.
- On June 18, 2019, RSS Racing crew chief Clifford Turner was suspended for violating NASCAR's Substance Abuse Policy. On September 24, NASCAR reinstated Turner after he completed the Road to Recovery Program.
- On July 11, 2019, Team Penske No. 22 crew chief Brian Wilson was suspended for one race after the car scheduled to race at Kentucky was discovered to have an illegal body modification. The L1-level penalty also resulted in a deduction of 10 points for the team and driver Austin Cindric, and a $10,000 fine.
- On July 21, 2019, Kaulig Racing announced the passing of Nick Harrison who was crew chief of the No. 11 driven by Justin Haley. Harrison, who passed at age 37, led the No. 11 to a 13th place finish at New Hampshire Motor Speedway the previous day. On July 24, Team President and former No. 11 crew chief Chris Rice was announced as Harrison's interim replacement starting with the Iowa race, although for unknown reasons Alex Yontz is listed on paper as crew chief.

=== Manufacturers ===
- For the 2019 season, Toyota will replace the Camry with the Supra.
- Before the 2018 Homestead race week, MBM Motorsports announced that they were selling their Chevrolet and Dodge Xfinity cars and intends to use Toyota bodies only for the 2019 season. They previously ran cars from all four manufacturers at some point throughout the 2018 season. It is unknown how many cars they will field, although Chad Finchum is expected to stay with the team for 2019.
- With the new flange-fit composite bodies being made mandatory in the 2019 season, Dodge left the Xfinity Series after the 2018 season, as the former Team Penske Challengers (nicknamed "Zombie Dodges" due to their lack of factory support since 2013) used by smaller teams were deemed ineligible due to their steel bodies. This also means that Dodge would have no representation in NASCAR's three major series for the first time since 1994.

== Rule changes ==
- On August 23, 2018, NASCAR announced that Cup drivers competing in Xfinity Series events would no longer be eligible to earn playoff bonus points for the cars that they were driving.
- On the same day, a change in the number of cars in the field was changed, downgrading the field size from 40 cars to 38 cars.
- The flange-fit composite bodies, first introduced in 2018, will be made mandatory for all races in the 2019 season.
- On February 4, 2019, NASCAR announced a new post-race inspection rule in all three series, where race-winning teams found to be in violation of the rule book will automatically be disqualified. Following a race, the first-place and second-place teams, along with at least one randomly selected car, will undergo post-race inspection. The inspection should take between 90 minutes and two hours to complete before the race winner is officially declared. The car that fails the inspection will receive last-place points and will be stripped of playoff and stage points.
  - At the 2019 Camping World 300 at Chicagoland Speedway on June 29, 2019, Christopher Bell became the first NXS driver to be disqualified under this rule after his car was discovered to be too low on the front during post-race inspection. As a result, his finish was demoted from third place to 38th place. Bell became the first NXS driver to be disqualified since Dale Jarrett in 1995.
  - At the 2019 Circle K Firecracker 250 at Daytona International Speedway on July 5, 2019, A. J. Allmendinger became the second NXS driver to be disqualified after his third-place finishing car failed an engine vacuum check during post-race inspection.
  - Allmendinger was once again disqualified at the 2019 Zippo 200 at The Glen at Watkins Glen International on August 3, 2019 when his second-place finishing car was discovered to be too low on both rear corners during post-race inspection.
  - At the 2019 Sport Clips Haircuts VFW 200 at Darlington Raceway on August 31, 2019, Denny Hamlin was stripped of his win after his car failed to meet height requirements during post-race inspection. As a result, second-place finisher Cole Custer was declared the official race winner.
  - At the 2019 Rhino Pro Truck Outfitters 300 at Las Vegas Motor Speedway, Ryan Sieg was disqualified after his 14th-place finishing car failed to meet height requirements during post-race inspection. The violation, however, did not affect Sieg's standing as one of the 12 qualifying drivers for the NXS Playoffs.
- On February 4, 2019, NASCAR announced a change in the qualifying schedule procedures for the majority of its tracks. For short tracks and intermediate speedways, the first round will be shortened from 15 minutes to 10 minutes, while the second and third rounds will remain at 10 and five minutes, respectively. The downtime intervals at all tracks will be reduced from seven minutes to five minutes. Superspeedway qualifications will retain their untimed two-round intervals of single-lap qualifying while road courses will continue to use two qualifying rounds: 25 minutes for the first round and 10 minutes for the final round.
- On May 1, 2019, following continued gamesmanship and other actions causing multi-car qualifying to become "untenable," NASCAR formally returned to single-car qualifying at all oval tracks. Knockout-Style qualifying would be kept at Watkins Glen, Mid-Ohio, Road America, and the Charlotte Motor Speedway Roval.
  - At oval tracks 1.25 miles and larger, each car will get a single timed lap.
  - At oval tracks 1.25 miles and smaller, each car will get two timed laps with the faster lap counting as their official time.
  - The qualifying order draw will be determined in part by the previous race's starting lineup. The top 20 starters from the previous race will draw to take their qualifying lap in positions 21–40 (the second half of qualifying). The remainder of cars will draw to qualify in positions 1–20.
  - The next car will be sent once the preceding car takes the white flag. This should ensure qualifying is completed in roughly 40 minutes baring any interruptions for crashes, debris, or weather.
  - There will be two-minute TV breaks built into qualifying to ensure every car gets covered live during the session.
  - Broadcasters FOX and NBC have committed to using ghost car graphics and impose other technologies to make the session more exciting to TV viewers.
  - Each car must complete their lap for the session to be counted, otherwise all times will be erased and cars will start by owner points.

== Schedule ==
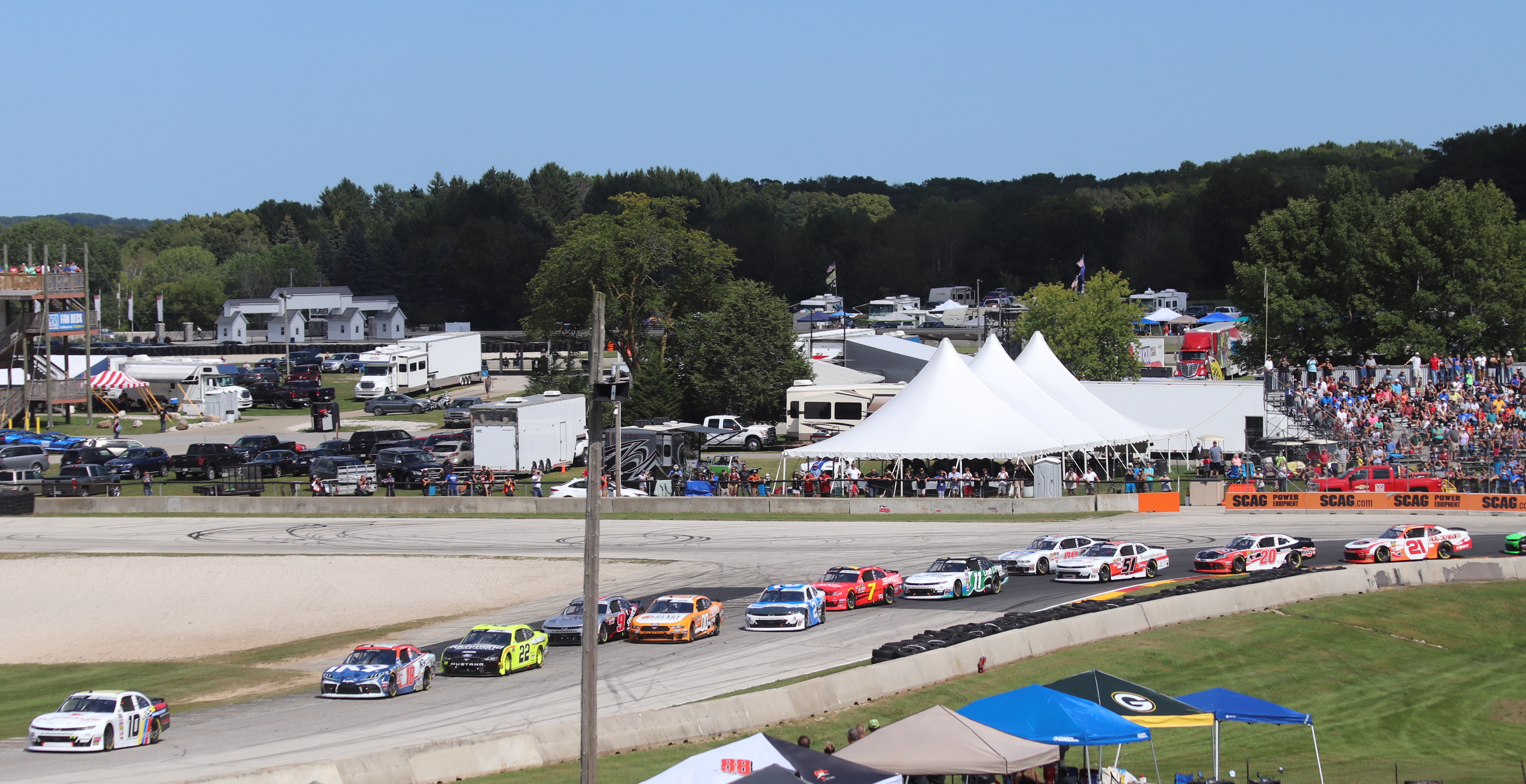
The CTECH Manufacturing 180 at Road America in August

The schedule, consisting of 33 races, was announced on June 13, 2018. Similar to the Monster Energy Cup Schedule, there are no changes from 2018 to 2019; However, both the regular-season finale at Las Vegas and the playoff race at Texas will be night races. The Charlotte Roval round, which was originally 200 kilometres (120 mi) long, was increased to 250 km (160 mi) for 2019.

Bonus money Dash 4 Cash races indicated in BOLD. Qualifying race for first Dash 4 Cash race in Italics.

No.	Race title	Track	Date
1	NASCAR Racing Experience 300	Daytona International Speedway, Daytona Beach	February 16
2	Rinnai 250	Atlanta Motor Speedway, Hampton	February 23
3	Boyd Gaming 300	Las Vegas Motor Speedway, Las Vegas	March 2
4	iK9 Service Dog 200	ISM Raceway, Avondale	March 9
5	Production Alliance Group 300	Auto Club Speedway, Fontana	March 16
6	My Bariatric Solutions 300	Texas Motor Speedway, Fort Worth	March 30
7	**Alsco 300**	Bristol Motor Speedway, Bristol	April 6
8	**ToyotaCare 250**	Richmond Raceway, Richmond	April 12
9	**MoneyLion 300**	Talladega Superspeedway, Lincoln	April 27
10	**Allied Steel Buildings 200**	Dover International Speedway, Dover	May 4
11	Alsco 300	Charlotte Motor Speedway, Concord	May 25
12	Pocono Green 250 recycled by J. P. Mascaro & Sons	Pocono Raceway, Long Pond	June 1
13	LTi Printing 250	Michigan International Speedway, Brooklyn	June 8
14	CircuitCity.com 250	Iowa Speedway, Newton	June 16
15	Camping World 300	Chicagoland Speedway, Joliet	June 29
16	Circle K Firecracker 250	Daytona International Speedway, Daytona Beach	July 5
17	Alsco 300	Kentucky Speedway, Sparta	July 12
18	ROXOR 200	New Hampshire Motor Speedway, Loudon	July 20
19	U.S. Cellular 250	Iowa Speedway, Newton	July 27
20	Zippo 200 at The Glen	Watkins Glen International, Watkins Glen	August 3
21	B&L Transport 170	Mid-Ohio Sports Car Course, Lexington	August 10
22	Food City 300	Bristol Motor Speedway, Bristol	August 16
23	CTECH Manufacturing 180	Road America, Elkhart Lake	August 24
24	Sport Clips Haircuts VFW 200	Darlington Raceway, Darlington	August 31
25	Indiana 250	Indianapolis Motor Speedway, Speedway	September 7
26	Rhino Pro Truck Outfitters 300	Las Vegas Motor Speedway, Las Vegas	September 14
NASCAR Xfinity Series Playoffs
Round of 12
27	Go Bowling 250	Richmond Raceway, Richmond	September 20
28	Drive for the Cure 250	Charlotte Motor Speedway (Roval), Concord	September 28
29	Use Your Melon Drive Sober 200	Dover International Speedway, Dover	October 5
Round of 8
30	Kansas Lottery 300	Kansas Speedway, Kansas City	October 19
31	O'Reilly Auto Parts 300	Texas Motor Speedway, Fort Worth	November 2
32	Desert Diamond Casino West Valley 200	ISM Raceway, Avondale	November 9
Championship 4
33	Ford EcoBoost 300	Homestead–Miami Speedway, Homestead	November 16

== Results and standings ==
=== Race results ===
No.	Race	Pole position	Most laps led	Winning driver	Manufacturer	No.	Winning team	Report
1	NASCAR Racing Experience 300	Tyler Reddick	Michael Annett	Michael Annett	Chevrolet	1	JR Motorsports	Report
2	Rinnai 250	Cole Custer	Christopher Bell	Christopher Bell	Toyota	20	Joe Gibbs Racing	Report
3	Boyd Gaming 300	Cole Custer	Kyle Busch	Kyle Busch	Toyota	18	Joe Gibbs Racing	Report
4	iK9 Service Dog 200	Christopher Bell	Kyle Busch	Kyle Busch	Toyota	18	Joe Gibbs Racing	Report
5	Production Alliance Group 300	Tyler Reddick	Kyle Busch	Cole Custer	Ford	00	Stewart–Haas Racing with Biagi–DenBeste	Report
6	My Bariatric Solutions 300	Christopher Bell	Christopher Bell	Kyle Busch	Toyota	18	Joe Gibbs Racing	Report
7	Alsco 300	Cole Custer	Justin Allgaier	Christopher Bell	Toyota	20	Joe Gibbs Racing	Report
8	ToyotaCare 250	Riley Herbst	Cole Custer	Cole Custer	Ford	00	Stewart–Haas Racing with Biagi–DenBeste	Report
9	MoneyLion 300	Michael Annett	Tyler Reddick	Tyler Reddick	Chevrolet	2	Richard Childress Racing	Report
10	Allied Steel Buildings 200	Cole Custer	Cole Custer	Christopher Bell	Toyota	20	Joe Gibbs Racing	Report
11	Alsco 300	Christopher Bell	Tyler Reddick	Tyler Reddick	Chevrolet	2	Richard Childress Racing	Report
12	Pocono Green 250	Cole Custer	Cole Custer	Cole Custer	Ford	00	Stewart–Haas Racing with Biagi–DenBeste	Report
13	LTi Printing 250	Paul Menard	Paul Menard	Tyler Reddick	Chevrolet	2	Richard Childress Racing	Report
14	CircuitCity.com 250	Cole Custer	Christopher Bell	Christopher Bell	Toyota	20	Joe Gibbs Racing	Report
15	Camping World 300	Joey Logano	Cole Custer	Cole Custer	Ford	00	Stewart–Haas Racing with Biagi–DenBeste	Report
16	Circle K Firecracker 250	Tyler Reddick	Ross Chastain	Ross Chastain	Chevrolet	16	Kaulig Racing	Report
17	Alsco 300	Austin Cindric	Cole Custer	Cole Custer	Ford	00	Stewart–Haas Racing with Biagi–DenBeste	Report
18	ROXOR 200	Cole Custer	Christopher Bell	Christopher Bell	Toyota	20	Joe Gibbs Racing	Report
19	U.S. Cellular 250	Christopher Bell	Christopher Bell	Chase Briscoe	Ford	98	Stewart–Haas Racing with Biagi–DenBeste	Report
20	Zippo 200 at The Glen	Kyle Busch	A. J. Allmendinger	Austin Cindric	Ford	22	Team Penske	Report
21	B&L Transport 170	Austin Cindric	Austin Cindric	Austin Cindric	Ford	22	Team Penske	Report
22	Food City 300	Austin Cindric	Kyle Busch	Tyler Reddick	Chevrolet	2	Richard Childress Racing	Report
23	CTECH Manufacturing 180	A. J. Allmendinger	Matt DiBenedetto	Christopher Bell	Toyota	20	Joe Gibbs Racing	Report
24	Sport Clips Haircuts VFW 200	Ryan Blaney	Tyler Reddick	Cole Custer (Note: Custer initially finished second in the race behind Denny Hamlin, but was awarded the victory after Hamlin's car failed post-race inspection which stripped him of the win.)	Ford	00	Stewart–Haas Racing with Biagi–DenBeste	Report
25	Indiana 250	Kyle Busch	Kyle Busch	Kyle Busch	Toyota	18	Joe Gibbs Racing	Report
26	Rhino Pro Truck Outfitters 300	Cole Custer	Christopher Bell	Tyler Reddick	Chevrolet	2	Richard Childress Racing	Report
NASCAR Xfinity Series Playoffs
Round of 12
27	Go Bowling 250	Austin Cindric	Christopher Bell	Christopher Bell	Toyota	20	Joe Gibbs Racing	Report
28	Drive for the Cure 250	Chase Briscoe	Chase Briscoe	A. J. Allmendinger	Chevrolet	10	Kaulig Racing	Report
29	Use Your Melon Drive Sober 200	Chase Briscoe	Chase Briscoe	Cole Custer	Ford	00	Stewart–Haas Racing with Biagi–DenBeste	Report
Round of 8
30	Kansas Lottery 300	Christopher Bell	Cole Custer	Brandon Jones	Toyota	19	Joe Gibbs Racing	Report
31	O'Reilly Auto Parts 300	Tyler Reddick	Christopher Bell	Christopher Bell	Toyota	20	Joe Gibbs Racing	Report
32	Desert Diamond Casino West Valley 200	Christopher Bell	Christopher Bell	Justin Allgaier	Chevrolet	7	JR Motorsports	Report
Championship 4
33	Ford EcoBoost 300	Tyler Reddick	Tyler Reddick	Tyler Reddick	Chevrolet	2	Richard Childress Racing	Report

=== Drivers' Championship ===
(key) Bold – Pole position awarded by time. Italics – Pole position set by final practice results or owner's points. * – Most laps led. ^{1} – Stage 1 winner. ^{2} – Stage 2 winner. ^{1–10} – Regular season top 10 finishers.
. – Eliminated after Round of 12 . – Eliminated after Round of 8

Pos	Driver	DAY	ATL	LVS	PHO	CAL	TEX	BRI	RCH	TAL	DOV	CLT	POC	MCH	IOW	CHI	DAY	KEN	NHA	IOW	GLN	MOH	BRI	ROA	DAR	IND	LVS	RCH	CLT	DOV	KAN	TEX	PHO	HOM	Pts.	Stage	Bonus
1	Tyler Reddick	**9**	5	14^{2}	3	**4**	2	2	4	1*^{1}	3	1*^{2}	2	1	15	9	**16**	3	4	5	5	4	1	3	2*^{1}	30	1	10	2	12	2	**29**	3	**1***	4040	–	44^{1}
2	Cole Custer	14	2	9^{1}	4	1	34	**3**	1*^{2}	32	**4***^{12}	24	**1***^{1}	12	**2**	1*^{1}	26	1*	**2**	29	7	8	22	10	1	7	**4**	3	8^{2}	1	11*^{2}	8	2	2	4035	–	50^{3}
3	Christopher Bell	6	1*^{12}	13	**30**^{2}	3	**3***^{1}	1	16	3	1	**31**^{1}	5	13^{2}	1*^{12}	38	3	2^{12}	1*^{2}	**2***^{12}	2	2	14	1	4	29	2*^{12}	1*^{12}	12	25	**12**^{1}	1*^{12}	16*^{12}	5	4032	–	62^{2}
4	Justin Allgaier	2	3	31	14	9	12	30*^{12}	3^{1}	28	2	2	11^{2}	5	3	32	17	7	3	6	3	6	8	9	9	2^{2}	5	4	4	2^{12}	5	6	1	14	4023	–	14^{4}
NASCAR Xfinity Series Playoffs cut-off
Pos	Driver	DAY	ATL	LVS	PHO	CAL	TEX	BRI	RCH	TAL	DOV	CLT	POC	MCH	IOW	CHI	DAY	KEN	NHA	IOW	GLN	MOH	BRI	ROA	DAR	IND	LVS	RCH	CLT	DOV	KAN	TEX	PHO	HOM	Pts.	Stage	Bonus
5	Chase Briscoe **(R)**	12	15	8	6	5	4	4	8	4	5	19	3	7	7	15	35	5	6	1	6	7^{1}	2	7^{2}	6	8	11	5	**9***^{1}	**5***	3	22	8	3^{1}	2302	48	13^{6}
6	Austin Cindric	5	10	22	5^{1}	6	11	6	2	5	6	9	7	11	10	5	4	**14**	12	37	1	**1***	**5**	2	10	27	12	**2**	3	3	25	3	6	7^{2}	2294	24	17^{5}
7	John Hunter Nemechek **(R)**	8	20	2	9	28	9	5	7	6	8	12	12	8	8	11	22	12	36	3	12	31	3	26	21	31	8	15	7	8	8	5	4	6	2253	47	–
8	Noah Gragson **(R)**	11	9	3	11	12	13	9	22	11^{2}	19	4	6	2	6	6	15	6	10	4	9	5	17	4	8	3	6	7	5	7	13	30	10	4	2246	25	5^{7}
9	Michael Annett	1*	12	5	8	13	6	8	13	**31**	10	6	8	3	9	3	25^{2}	4	11	10	8	13	9	12	13	12	13	9	15	6	4	11	9	11	2239	19	9^{8}
10	Brandon Jones	3	4	28	7	7	33	14	33	18	7	10	38	6	11	4	30	30	9^{1}	33	17	10	11^{1}	16	7	6^{1}	3	11	16	37	1	4	11	8	2207	28	4^{10}
11	Ryan Sieg	4	11	6	10	11	10^{2}	12	5	16	11	8	26	17	30	12	24	9	8	12	30	16	25	11	14	10	38	12	30	10	9	10	13	12	2171	7	1
12	Justin Haley **(R)**	17^{1}	8	10	12	10	7	7	10	7	17	5	9	10	13	7	2	10	13	8	14	9	34	6	11	5	15	17	31	4	7	32	7	33	2155	23	3^{9}
13	Gray Gaulding	34	16	12	16	16	21	15	17	2	20	14	20	16	14	14	8	15	17	14	15	14	6	29	15	13	7	22	29	18	17	13	12	17	713	20	–
14	Jeremy Clements	36	18	15	13	14	26	13	35	27	18	13	16	15	12	13	9	13	15	30	11	11	4	8	12	11	20	16	11	36	6	28	18	16	699	37	–
15	Brandon Brown **(R)**	18	13	17	15	15	17	23	20	15	13	20	13	26	31	22	6	17	16	27	18	24	12	37	33	28	16	34	17	11	18	25	20	13	574	2	–
16	Ray Black Jr.	30	23	11	18	17	35	16	21	34	24	16	18	30	16	20	13	35	18	11	22	19	15	14	16	20	19	18	32	17	14	12	14	38	547	–	–
17	Josh Williams	22	21	16	29	33	14	19	DNQ	8	22	27	15	23	17	26	28	18	19	15	19	22	30	31	24	17	18	23	20	15	21	14	15	19	527	3	–
18	Stephen Leicht	38	25	27	31	22	22	32	18	24	26	15	23	20	25	21	5	24	23	16	20	32	19	34	26	23	21	29	19	23	27	19	21	24	449	–	–
19	Garrett Smithley	24	17	18	22	19	31	22	19	12	23	17	29	27	29	25	14	19	24	22	24	20	28	33	29	14	23	27	33	26	33	17	27	32	443	1	–
20	B. J. McLeod	27	24	20	21	24	32	18	30	22	27	18	17	19		23	33	20	21		27	26	26	23	19	22	22	30	23	16	19	16		20	425	–	–
21	Matt Mills	26	30	29	28	23	27	21	28	17	31	26	30	24	26	27	10	23	20	18			18		31	25	24	28		24	20	18	19	30	372	–	–
22	David Starr	20	27	19	27	21	20	25	29	14	28	22	24	25	34	36	32	21	26	31	29	33	24	17	27	37	26	25	34	21	23	33	25	23	364	–	–
23	Vinnie Miller	25	32	26	23	25	25	24	27	19	32	23	25	28	32	29	11	25	27	20	36	25	21	28	28	26	30	35	25	20	30	24	31	26	358	–	–
24	Joey Gase	16	29	38	24	27	24	27	23	37	29	21	33	29	33	33	DNQ	22	31	19	34	36	20	19	25	18	29	20	21	22	32	26	24	27	339	–	–
25	Zane Smith			24				11	6		9				5	17				9								8		9			5		322	55	–
26	Chad Finchum		26	21	19	32	23	20	34	36	30	38	37	22	21	24	27	28	30	32	32	35	DNQ	35	30	33	34	26	36	31	26	15	32	35	250	–	–
27	Timmy Hill	19	28	23		34	37	17	37	29	16	35	19	31	36	34	20	37	34	35		27	7		23				18	27	DNQ	35		34	242	6	–
28	Tommy Joe Martins		31		35	20	19	26			21			18		28			25		28	18	31	25	35	24	25		35				17		206	1	–
29	Jeb Burton						5					7		9									32			4						9		9	201	17	–
30	Alex Labbé		19					31		25									22		16				17		17		6		15			18	195	11	–
31	Jeffrey Earnhardt	15	6				8			26		3	22			16	Wth																		187	24	–
32	Landon Cassill									9		34		32		19	37	26	37				10		18	16	36	36		29	36	36	38	15	175	6	–
33	Ryan Truex				2													8	7								14		10		38				169	24	–
34	Shane Lee														18	18	21	16	33	7			13		Wth										133	–	–
35	Ronnie Bassett Jr.				32		15				25	25	21		24	30		29					33			15						31	33		131	–	–
36	Mike Harmon	35	33	30	25	26	29	29	31	23	33		28		27		DNQ	27		34					32	32				34			29		129	–	–
37	Kaz Grala						18		14		14								14					5											120	–	–
38	Stefan Parsons																12			21					22	19				19		23			106	–	–
39	A. J. Allmendinger																38				37*	3		**24**^{1}					1						105	16	6
40	Dillon Bassett								15			DNQ		38					DNQ	26								13		14	16				102	–	–
41	Jeff Green	7	36	32	33	36	38	34	38	35	36	37	36	36	37	37	7	36																	85	–	–
42	Tyler Matthews								24						20				32				27				28	33			28		22	37	83	–	–
43	Will Rodgers																			28		12							28					22	58	–	–
44	Joe Graf Jr.													DNQ	19		23						DNQ					14							55	–	–
45	C. J. McLaughlin																		28^{±}				23				31	31			24	27		31	55	–	–
46	Elliott Sadler								12																		10								52	–	–
47	Chris Cockrum	31								10							19																		51	–	–
48	Ryan Vargas																			17				18									26		50	–	–
49	Regan Smith																					21		13											48	8	–
50	Ryan Repko														22					25								19							45	–	–
51	Cody Ware									21											21								24^{§}						45	–	–
52	Dale Earnhardt Jr.																								5										41	9	–
53	Lawson Aschenbach																					28							14						35	3	–
54	Kyle Weatherman							28^{†}	32					34												35	32			35	22	34			35	–	–
55	Jairo Avila Jr.			25								DNQ						38									27							25	35	–	–
56	Scott Heckert																				13	29													34	2	–
57	Jack Hawksworth																					15^{2}													32	10	1
58	J. J. Yeley																			38^{¤}	35^{¤}	37^{¤}	16^{¤}	38	36	38	37	21	38	32	37	38	37	36	30	–	–
59	Ryan Ellis														23									21											30	–	–
60	Stan Mullis			35	36										28					23							35	37							29	–	–
61	Morgan Shepherd		35	33	34	31	DNQ	35	Wth		35		35		35	DNQ		34		36			DNQ		37	36									29	–	–
62	Max Tullman	28								20												38													27	–	–
63	Colin Garrett								26																									21	27	–	–
64	John Jackson	32	37			30		37			37		31					31																	27	–	–
65	Nicolas Hammann																							15											22	–	–
66	Scott Lagasse Jr.	21															31																		22	–	–
67	Caesar Bacarella	29				37											29																		17	–	–
68	Bobby Dale Earnhardt																														31	37	28	DNQ	16	–	–
69	Loris Hezemans																							22											15	–	–
70	Patrick Gallagher																					23													14	–	–
71	Hermie Sadler																											24							13	–	–
72	Donald Theetge			37					25																										13	–	–
73	Preston Pardus																							36					27						11	–	–
74	Carl Long																		38											28					10	–	–
75	Mason Diaz								36			30											38												9	–	–
76	Aaron Quine																					30		Wth											7	–	–
77	Dick Karth																							30^{¶}											7	–	–
78	Dexter Bean																							32									35		7	–	–
	Mark Meunier																			DNQ															0	–	–
Ineligible for Xfinity Series driver points
Pos	Driver	DAY	ATL	LVS	PHO	CAL	TEX	BRI	RCH	TAL	DOV	CLT	POC	MCH	IOW	CHI	DAY	KEN	NHA	IOW	GLN	MOH	BRI	ROA	DAR	IND	LVS	RCH	CLT	DOV	KAN	TEX	PHO	HOM	Pts.	Stage	Bonus
	Kyle Busch			1*	1*	2*^{12}	1														**31**^{1}		29*^{2}			**1***											
	Ross Chastain	13^{2}	14	7	17	18	16	33	11	30	12	11	14	14		8	1*^{1}		QL		33									13	10	2					
	Joey Logano															**2**^{2}							36														
	Ryan Blaney																				4^{2}				**3**^{2}												
	Paul Menard													**4***^{1}					5																		
	Harrison Burton							10							4				29									6	13	38	34	7		10			
	Ryan Preece		7			8							4								10																
	Austin Dillon			4								28^{‡}	10													34											
	Riley Herbst								9		15			37		10	18	11		13							9						30				
	Austin Hill																DNQ									9											
	Chase Elliott	10																																			
	Brett Moffitt									13																											
	Josh Bilicki	23	34	36	26	29	30	36		33	38	36	34	21	38	35		32	DNQ		26	17		20		21			26		29	21	23				
	Bayley Currey		22	34	37	35	DNQ				34	33		33		QL			35										37	33	35	20	36				
	Camden Murphy											29	32			31		33	DNQ	24			DNQ		20												
	Tyler Hill				20		28							35																							
	Joe Nemechek											32				DNQ	36						35		34		33	32	22	30			34	29			
	Stanton Barrett																				23																
	Dan Corcoran																				25																
	Todd Peck												27																								
	Matt DiBenedetto																							27*													
	Robby Lyons																																	28			
	D. J. Kennington	33																																			
	Sheldon Creed																34																				
	Chris Dyson																					34															
	Brad Keselowski	37					36																														
	Erik Jones																						37														
	Denny Hamlin																								38												
	Mike Marlar																											38									
Pos	Driver	DAY	ATL	LVS	PHO	CAL	TEX	BRI	RCH	TAL	DOV	CLT	POC	MCH	IOW	CHI	DAY	KEN	NHA	IOW	GLN	MOH	BRI	ROA	DAR	IND	LVS	RCH	CLT	DOV	KAN	TEX	PHO	HOM	Pts.	Stage	Bonus
^{†} – Kyle Weatherman started receiving points at Richmond 1.^{‡} – Due to the extreme heat, Austin Dillon did not complete the race and during a caution, he was replaced by Daniel Hemric. Since Dillon started the race, he is officially credited with the 28th-place finish.^{±} – C. J. McLaughlin started receiving points at Bristol 2.^{¶} – After being lapped and struggling early on in the race in his Xfinity Series debut, Dick Karth did not complete the race and around lap 15, he was replaced by Timmy Hill. Since Karth started the race, he is officially credited with the 30th-place finish.^{¤} – J. J. Yeley started receiving points at Road America.^{§} – Due to feeling sick, Cody Ware did not complete the race and was replaced during the race by Stefan Parsons. Since Ware started the race, he is officially credited with the 24th-place finish.

=== Owners' championship (Top 15) ===
(key) Bold - Pole position awarded by time. Italics - Pole position set by final practice results or rainout. * – Most laps led. ^{1} – Stage 1 winner. ^{2} – Stage 2 winner. ^{1-10} – Owners' regular season top 10 finishers.
. – Eliminated after Round of 12 . – Eliminated after Round of 8

Pos.	No.	Car Owner	DAY	ATL	LVS	PHO	CAL	TEX	BRI	RCH	TAL	DOV	CLT	POC	MCH	IOW	CHI	DAY	KEN	NHA	IOW	GLN	MOH	BRI	ROA	DAR	IND	LVS	RCH	CLT	DOV	KAN	TEX	PHO	HOM	Points	Bonus
1	2	Richard Childress	**9**	5	14^{2}	3	**4**	2	2	4	1*^{1}	3	1*^{2}	2	1	15	9	**16**	3	4	5	5	4	1	3	2*^{1}	30	1	10	2	12	2	**29**	3	**1***	4040	44^{1}
2	00	Gene Haas	14	2	9^{1}	4	1	34	**3**	1*^{2}	32	**4***^{12}	24	**1***^{1}	12	**2**	1*^{1}	26	1*	**2**	29	7	8	22	10	1	7	**4**	3	8^{2}	1	11*^{2}	8	2	2	4035	50^{3}
3	20	Joe Gibbs	6	1*^{12}	13	**30**^{2}	3	**3***^{1}	1	16	3	1	**31**^{1}	5	13^{2}	1*^{12}	38	3	2^{12}	1*^{2}	**2***^{12}	2	2	14	1	4	29	2*^{12}	1*^{12}	12	25	**12**^{1}	1*^{12}	**16***^{12}	5	4032	62^{2}
4	7	Kelley Earnhardt Miller	2	3	31	14	9	12	30*^{12}	3^{1}	28	2	2	11^{2}	5	3	32	17	7	3	6	3	6	8	9	9	2^{2}	5	4	4	2^{12}	5	6	1	14	4023	14^{4}
NASCAR Xfinity Series Playoffs cut-off
5	98	Fred Biagi	12	15	8	6	5	4	4	8	4	5	19	3	7	7	15	35	5	6	1	6	7^{1}	2	7^{2}	6	8	11	5	**9***^{1}	**5***	3	22	8	3^{1}	2302	13^{6}
6	22	Roger Penske	5	10	22	5^{1}	6	11	6	2	5	6	9	7	11	10	5	4	**14**	12	37	1	**1***	**5**	2	10	27	12	**2**	3	3	25	3	6	7^{2}	2294	17^{5}
7	9	Rick Hendrick	11	9	3	11	12	13	9	22	11^{2}	19	4	6	2	6	6	15	6	10	4	9	5	17	4	8	3	6	7	5	7	13	30	10	4	2246	5^{7}
8	1	Dale Earnhardt Jr.	1*	12	5	8	13	6	8	13	**31**	10	6	8	3	9	3	25^{2}	4	11	10	8	13	9	12	13	12	13	9	15	6	4	11	9	11	2239	9^{8}
9	19	Joe Gibbs	3	4	28	7	7	33	14	33	18	7	10	38	6	11	4	30	30	9^{1}	33	17	10	11^{1}	16	7	6^{1}	3	11	16	37	1	4	11	8	2206	3
10	8	Dale Earnhardt Jr.	10	7	24	2	8	5	11	6	13	9	7	4	9	5	17	34	8	7	9	10	21	32	13	5	4	14	8	10	9	38	9	5	9	2200	1^{10}
11	11	Matt Kaulig	17^{1}	8	10	12	10	7	7	10	7	17	5	9	10	13	7	2	10	13	8	14	9	34	6	11	5	15	17	31	4	7	32	7	33	2155	3^{9}
12	18	Joe Gibbs	15	6	1*	1*	2*^{12}	1	10	9	26	15	3	22	37	4	10	18	11	29	13	**31**^{1}	15^{2}	29*^{2}	27*	38	**1***	9	6	13	38	34	7	30	10	2132	1
13	23	Maurice J. Gallagher Jr.	8	20	2	9	28	9	5	7	6	8	12	12	8	8	11	22	12	36	3	12	31	3	26	21	31	8	15	7	8	8	5	4	6	976	–
14	39	Rod Sieg	4	11	6	10	11	10^{2}	12	5	16	11	8	26	17	30	12	24	9	28	12	30	16	25	11	14	10	38	12	30	10	9	10	13	12	820	1
15	08	Bobby Dotter	34	16	12	16	16	21	15	17	2	20	14	20	16	14	14	8	15	17	14	15	14	6	29	15	13	7	22	29	18	17	13	12	17	713	–
Pos.	No.	Car Owner	DAY	ATL	LVS	PHO	CAL	TEX	BRI	RCH	TAL	DOV	CLT	POC	MCH	IOW	CHI	DAY	KEN	NHA	IOW	GLN	MOH	BRI	ROA	DAR	IND	LVS	RCH	CLT	DOV	KAN	TEX	PHO	HOM	Points	Bonus

=== Manufacturers' Championship ===
Pos	Manufacturer	Wins	Points
1	Chevrolet	10	1191
2	Ford	10	1166
3	Toyota	13	1154

== See also ==
- 2019 Monster Energy NASCAR Cup Series
- 2019 NASCAR Gander Outdoors Truck Series
- 2019 ARCA Menards Series
- 2019 NASCAR K&N Pro Series East
- 2019 NASCAR K&N Pro Series West
- 2019 NASCAR Whelen Modified Tour
- 2019 NASCAR PEAK Mexico Series
- 2019 NASCAR Whelen Euro Series
- 2019 NASCAR Pinty's Series
