= 2019 Rhino Pro Truck Outfitters 300 =

Race details
- Race 26 of 33 in the 2019 NASCAR Xfinity Series season
- Date: September 14, 2019
- Location: Las Vegas Motor Speedway in Las Vegas
- Course: Permanent racing facility
- Course length: 1.5 miles (2.4 km)
- Distance: 200 laps, 300 mi (482 km)

Pole position
Driver	Cole Custer	Stewart-Haas Racing with Biagi-DenBeste Racing
- Time: 29.773

Most laps led
Driver	Christopher Bell	Joe Gibbs Racing
- Laps: 154

Winner
No. 2	Tyler Reddick	Richard Childress Racing

Television in the United States
- Network: NBCSN

Radio in the United States
- Radio: MRN

The 2019 Rhino Pro Truck Outfitters 300 is a NASCAR Xfinity Series race held on September 14, 2019, at Las Vegas Motor Speedway in Las Vegas, Nevada. Contested over 200 laps on the 1.5 mi (2.4 km) asphalt intermediate speedway, it was the 26th race of the 2019 NASCAR Xfinity Series season, and the final race of the regular season before the playoffs.

== Background ==
=== Track ===
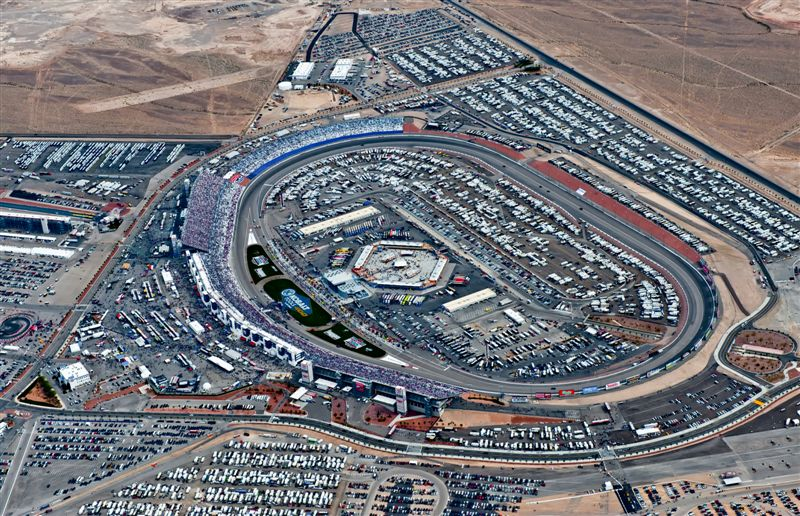
Las Vegas Motor Speedway, the track where the race was held.

Las Vegas Motor Speedway, located in Clark County, Nevada outside the Las Vegas city limits and about 15 miles northeast of the Las Vegas Strip, is a 1,200-acre (490 ha) complex of multiple tracks for motorsports racing. The complex is owned by Speedway Motorsports, Inc., which is headquartered in Charlotte, North Carolina.

== Entry list ==
No.	Driver	Team	Manufacturer
00	Cole Custer	Stewart-Haas Racing with Biagi-DenBeste Racing	Ford
0	Garrett Smithley	JD Motorsports	Chevrolet
01	Stephen Leicht	JD Motorsports	Chevrolet
1	Michael Annett	JR Motorsports	Chevrolet
2	Tyler Reddick	Richard Childress Racing	Chevrolet
4	B. J. McLeod	JD Motorsports	Chevrolet
5	Matt Mills	B. J. McLeod Motorsports	Chevrolet
07	Ray Black Jr.	SS-Green Light Racing	Chevrolet
7	Justin Allgaier	JR Motorsports	Chevrolet
08	Gray Gaulding (R)	SS-Green Light Racing	Chevrolet
8	Ryan Truex	JR Motorsports	Chevrolet
9	Noah Gragson (R)	JR Motorsports	Chevrolet
10	Elliott Sadler	Kaulig Racing	Chevrolet
11	Justin Haley (R)	Kaulig Racing	Chevrolet
13	Stan Mullis	MBM Motorsports	Toyota
15	Tyler Matthews	JD Motorsports	Chevrolet
17	Joe Nemechek (i)	Rick Ware Racing	Chevrolet
18	Riley Herbst (i)	Joe Gibbs Racing	Toyota
19	Brandon Jones	Joe Gibbs Racing	Toyota
20	Christopher Bell	Joe Gibbs Racing	Toyota
22	Austin Cindric	Team Penske	Ford
23	John Hunter Nemechek (R)	GMS Racing	Chevrolet
35	Joey Gase	MBM Motorsports	Toyota
36	Josh Williams	DGM Racing	Chevrolet
38	J. J. Yeley	RSS Racing	Chevrolet
39	Ryan Sieg	RSS Racing	Chevrolet
51	Jeremy Clements	Jeremy Clements Racing	Chevrolet
52	David Starr	Jimmy Means Racing	Chevrolet
61	Tommy Joe Martins	MBM Motorsports	Toyota
66	Chad Finchum	MBM Motorsports	Toyota
74	Kyle Weatherman	Mike Harmon Racing	Chevrolet
78	Vinnie Miller	B. J. McLeod Motorsports	Chevrolet
86	Brandon Brown	Brandonbilt Motorsports	Chevrolet
89	Landon Cassill	Shepherd Racing Ventures	Chevrolet
90	Alex Labbé	DGM Racing	Chevrolet
93	C. J. McLaughlin	RSS Racing	Chevrolet
98	Chase Briscoe (R)	Stewart-Haas Racing with Biagi-DenBeste Racing	Ford
99	Jairo Avila Jr.	B. J. McLeod Motorsports	Toyota

== Practice ==
=== First practice ===
Tyler Reddick was the fastest in the first practice session with a time of 30.659 seconds and a speed of 176.131 mph (283.455 km/h).

Pos	No.	Driver	Team	Manufacturer	Time	Speed
1	2	Tyler Reddick	Richard Childress Racing	Chevrolet	30.659	176.131
2	98	Chase Briscoe (R)	Stewart-Haas Racing with Biagi-DenBeste Racing	Ford	30.720	175.781
3	22	Austin Cindric	Team Penske	Ford	30.812	175.256

=== Final practice ===
Tyler Reddick was the fastest in the final practice session with a time of 30.744 seconds and a speed of 175.644 mph (282.672 km/h).

Pos	No.	Driver	Team	Manufacturer	Time	Speed
1	2	Tyler Reddick	Richard Childress Racing	Chevrolet	30.744	175.644
2	7	Justin Allgaier	JR Motorsports	Chevrolet	30.836	175.120
3	23	John Hunter Nemechek (R)	GMS Racing	Chevrolet	30.929	174.593

== Qualifying ==
Cole Custer scored the pole for the race with a time of 29.773 seconds and a speed of 181.372 mph (291.890 km/h).

=== Qualifying results ===
Pos	No	Driver	Team	Manufacturer	Time
1	00	Cole Custer	Stewart-Haas Racing with Biagi-DenBeste Racing	Ford	29.773
2	20	Christopher Bell	Joe Gibbs Racing	Toyota	29.825
3	7	Justin Allgaier	JR Motorsports	Chevrolet	29.840
4	2	Tyler Reddick	Richard Childress Racing	Chevrolet	29.909
5	22	Austin Cindric	Team Penske	Ford	29.924
6	19	Brandon Jones	Joe Gibbs Racing	Toyota	29.948
7	98	Chase Briscoe (R)	Stewart-Haas Racing with Biagi-DenBeste Racing	Ford	30.096
8	10	Elliott Sadler	Kaulig Racing	Chevrolet	30.143
9	89	Landon Cassill	Shepherd Racing Ventures	Chevrolet	30.169
10	11	Justin Haley (R)	Kaulig Racing	Chevrolet	30.289
11	1	Michael Annett	JR Motorsports	Chevrolet	30.312
12	51	Jeremy Clements	Jeremy Clements Racing	Chevrolet	30.478
13	23	John Hunter Nemechek (R)	GMS Racing	Chevrolet	30.490
14	38	J. J. Yeley	RSS Racing	Chevrolet	30.538
15	18	Riley Herbst (i)	Joe Gibbs Racing	Toyota	30.577
16	08	Gray Gaulding (R)	SS-Green Light Racing	Chevrolet	30.725
17	86	Brandon Brown	Brandonbilt Motorsports	Chevrolet	30.762
18	61	Tommy Joe Martins	MBM Motorsports	Toyota	30.827
19	39	Ryan Sieg	RSS Racing	Chevrolet	30.842
20	07	Ray Black Jr.	SS-Green Light Racing	Chevrolet	31.011
21	4	B. J. McLeod	JD Motorsports	Chevrolet	31.083
22	8	Ryan Truex	JR Motorsports	Chevrolet	31.101
23	01	Stephen Leicht	JD Motorsports	Chevrolet	31.157
24	5	Matt Mills	B. J. McLeod Motorsports	Chevrolet	31.170
25	74	Kyle Weatherman	Mike Harmon Racing	Chevrolet	31.218
26	0	Garrett Smithley	JD Motorsports	Chevrolet	31.272
27	17	Joe Nemechek (i)	Rick Ware Racing	Chevrolet	31.399
28	15	Tyler Matthews	JD Motorsports	Chevrolet	31.486
29	36	Josh Williams	DGM Racing	Chevrolet	31.670
30	52	David Starr	Jimmy Means Racing	Chevrolet	31.691
31	93	C. J. McLaughlin	RSS Racing	Chevrolet	31.828
32	35	Joey Gase	MBM Motorsports	Toyota	31.918
33	66	Chad Finchum	MBM Motorsports	Toyota	32.364
34	78	Vinnie Miller	B. J. McLeod Motorsports	Chevrolet	32.595
35	13	Stan Mullis	MBM Motorsports	Toyota	33.330
36	9	Noah Gragson (R)	JR Motorsports	Chevrolet	0.000
37	90	Alex Labbé	DGM Racing	Chevrolet	0.000
38	99	Jairo Avila Jr.	B. J. McLeod Motorsports	Toyota	0.000

== Race ==
=== Summary ===
Cole Custer started on pole, but Christopher Bell overtook him and proved to have the fastest car of the night. Bell won both stages and was able to prevent contenders Custer, Justin Allgaier, and Chase Briscoe from passing him on a straightaway. Tyler Reddick clinched the regular season championship after Stage 2.

A caution was thrown on lap 128 after C. J. McLaughlin slammed the turn 3 wall. Reddick pit as his car needed repairs while the leaders stayed out. Reddick went out front when the leaders made green-flag stops between laps 165 and 175 as no cautions occurred afterwards. With 25 laps remaining, Reddick's lead increased to 10 seconds, prompting him to save fuel. Bell began catching up to Reddick, closing in the gap. Ultimately, Reddick (despite his car sputtering over the last three laps) was able to hold off Bell to win the race. For the playoffs, John Hunter Nemechek and Ryan Sieg took the final two spots on points over Gray Gaulding and Jeremy Clements.

=== Stage Results ===
Stage One Laps: 45

Pos	No	Driver	Team	Manufacturer	Points
1	20	Christopher Bell	Joe Gibbs Racing	Toyota	10
2	7	Justin Allgaier	JR Motorsports	Chevrolet	9
3	2	Tyler Reddick	Richard Childress Racing	Chevrolet	8
4	22	Austin Cindric	Team Penske	Ford	7
5	00	Cole Custer	Stewart-Haas Racing with Biagi-DenBeste	Ford	6
6	19	Brandon Jones	Joe Gibbs Racing	Toyota	5
7	23	John Hunter Nemechek (R)	GMS Racing	Chevrolet	4
8	98	Chase Briscoe (R)	Stewart-Haas Racing with Biagi-DenBeste	Ford	3
9	1	Michael Annett	JR Motorsports	Chevrolet	2
10	11	Justin Haley (R)	Kaulig Racing	Chevrolet	1

Stage Two Laps: 45

Pos	No	Driver	Team	Manufacturer	Points
1	20	Christopher Bell	Joe Gibbs Racing	Toyota	10
2	7	Justin Allgaier	JR Motorsports	Chevrolet	9
3	00	Cole Custer	Stewart-Haas Racing with Biagi-DenBeste	Ford	8
4	98	Chase Briscoe (R)	Stewart-Haas Racing with Biagi-DenBeste	Ford	7
5	2	Tyler Reddick	Richard Childress Racing	Chevrolet	6
6	19	Brandon Jones	Joe Gibbs Racing	Toyota	5
7	22	Austin Cindric	Team Penske	Ford	4
8	8	Ryan Truex	JR Motorsports	Chevrolet	3
9	23	John Hunter Nemechek (R)	GMS Racing	Chevrolet	2
10	1	Michael Annett	JR Motorsports	Chevrolet	1

=== Final Stage Results ===
Stage Three Laps: 110

Pos	Grid	No	Driver	Team	Manufacturer	Laps	Points
1	4	2	Tyler Reddick	Richard Childress Racing	Chevrolet	200	54
2	2	20	Christopher Bell	Joe Gibbs Racing	Toyota	200	55
3	6	19	Brandon Jones	Joe Gibbs Racing	Toyota	200	44
4	1	00	Cole Custer	Stewart-Haas Racing with Biagi-DenBeste	Ford	200	47
5	3	7	Justin Allgaier	JR Motorsports	Chevrolet	200	50
6	36	9	Noah Gragson (R)	JR Motorsports	Chevrolet	200	31
7	16	08	Gray Gaulding	SS-Green Light Racing	Chevrolet	199	30
8	13	23	John Hunter Nemechek (R)	GMS Racing	Chevrolet	199	35
9	15	18	Riley Herbst (i)	Joe Gibbs Racing	Toyota	199	0
10	8	10	Elliott Sadler	Kaulig Racing	Chevrolet	199	27
11	7	98	Chase Briscoe (R)	Stewart-Haas Racing with Biagi-DenBeste	Ford	199	36
12	5	22	Austin Cindric	Team Penske	Ford	199	36
13	11	1	Michael Annett	JR Motorsports	Chevrolet	199	27
14	22	8	Ryan Truex	JR Motorsports	Chevrolet	199	26
15	10	11	Justin Haley (R)	Kaulig Racing	Chevrolet	199	23
16	17	86	Brandon Brown (R)	Brandonbilt Motorsports	Chevrolet	198	21
17	37	90	Alex Labbé	DGM Racing	Chevrolet	198	20
18	29	36	Josh Williams	DGM Racing	Chevrolet	198	19
19	20	07	Ray Black Jr.	SS-Green Light Racing	Chevrolet	197	18
20	12	51	Jeremy Clements	Jeremy Clements Racing	Chevrolet	197	17
21	23	01	Stephen Leicht	JD Motorsports	Chevrolet	197	16
22	21	4	B. J. McLeod	JD Motorsports	Chevrolet	196	15
23	26	0	Garrett Smithley	JD Motorsports	Chevrolet	196	14
24	24	5	Matt Mills	B. J. McLeod Motorsports	Chevrolet	195	13
25	18	61	Tommy Joe Martins	MBM Motorsports	Toyota	194	12
26	30	52	David Starr	Jimmy Means Racing	Chevrolet	194	11
27	38	99	Jairo Avila Jr.	B. J. McLeod Motorsports	Toyota	193	10
28	28	15	Tyler Matthews	JD Motorsports	Chevrolet	191	9
29	32	35	Joey Gase	MBM Motorsports	Toyota	187	8
30	34	78	Vinnie Miller	B. J. McLeod Motorsports	Chevrolet	186	7
31	31	93	C. J. McLaughlin	RSS Racing	Chevrolet	121	6
32	25	74	Kyle Weatherman	Mike Harmon Racing	Chevrolet	66	5
33	27	17	Joe Nemechek (i)	Rick Ware Racing	Chevrolet	56	0
34	33	66	Chad Finchum	MBM Motorsports	Toyota	52	3
35	35	13	Stan Mullis	MBM Motorsports	Toyota	22	2
36	9	89	Landon Cassill	Shepherd Racing Ventures	Chevrolet	20	1
37	14	38	J. J. Yeley	RSS Racing	Chevrolet	2	1
38	19	39	Ryan Sieg	RSS Racing	Chevrolet	199	1

O. – Driver made the playoffs cut.

- Ryan Sieg was disqualified for technical infringements, but he still made the playoffs on points.

Previous race: 2019 Indiana 250	NASCAR Xfinity Series; 2019 season	Next race: 2019 Go Bowling 250
