= 2019 Production Alliance Group 300 =

Race details
- Race 5 of 33 in the 2019 NASCAR Xfinity Series season
- Track map of the speedway at Auto Club Speedway AKA California Speedway
- Date: March 16, 2019
- Location: Auto Club Speedway in Fontana, California
- Course: Permanent racing facility
- Course length: 3.22 km (2 miles)
- Distance: 150 laps, 300 mi (483 km)

Pole position
Driver	Tyler Reddick	Richard Childress Racing
- Time: 40.031

Most laps led
Driver	Kyle Busch	Joe Gibbs Racing
- Laps: 98

Winner
No. 00	Cole Custer	Stewart-Haas Racing with Biagi-DenBeste Racing

Television in the United States
- Network: FS1

Radio in the United States
- Radio: MRN

The 2019 Production Alliance Group 300 was a NASCAR Xfinity Series race held on March 16, 2019, at Auto Club Speedway in Fontana, California. Contested over 150 laps on the two-mile (3.2 km) D-shaped oval, it was the fifth race of the 2019 NASCAR Xfinity Series season.

== Entry list ==
No.	Driver	Team	Manufacturer
00	Cole Custer	Stewart-Haas Racing with Biagi-DenBeste Racing	Ford
0	Garrett Smithley	JD Motorsports	Chevrolet
01	Stephen Leicht	JD Motorsports	Chevrolet
1	Michael Annett	JR Motorsports	Chevrolet
2	Tyler Reddick	Richard Childress Racing	Chevrolet
4	Ross Chastain	JD Motorsports	Chevrolet
5	Matt Mills (R)	B. J. McLeod Motorsports	Chevrolet
07	Ray Black Jr.	SS-Green Light Racing	Chevrolet
7	Justin Allgaier	JR Motorsports	Chevrolet
08	Gray Gaulding (R)	SS-Green Light Racing	Chevrolet
8	Ryan Preece (i)	JR Motorsports	Chevrolet
9	Noah Gragson (R)	JR Motorsports	Chevrolet
11	Justin Haley (R)	Kaulig Racing	Chevrolet
13	John Jackson	MBM Motorsports	Toyota
15	B. J. McLeod	JD Motorsports	Chevrolet
17	Bayley Currey (i)	Rick Ware Racing	Chevrolet
18	Kyle Busch (i)	Joe Gibbs Racing	Toyota
19	Brandon Jones	Joe Gibbs Racing	Toyota
20	Christopher Bell	Joe Gibbs Racing	Toyota
22	Austin Cindric	Team Penske	Ford
23	John Hunter Nemechek (R)	GMS Racing	Chevrolet
35	Joey Gase	MBM Motorsports	Toyota
36	Josh Williams	DGM Racing	Chevrolet
38	Jeff Green	RSS Racing	Chevrolet
39	Ryan Sieg	RSS Racing	Chevrolet
42	Chad Finchum	MBM Motorsports	Toyota
51	Jeremy Clements	Jeremy Clements Racing	Chevrolet
52	David Starr	Jimmy Means Racing	Chevrolet
66	Timmy Hill	MBM Motorsports	Toyota
74	Mike Harmon	Mike Harmon Racing	Chevrolet
78	Vinnie Miller	B. J. McLeod Motorsports	Chevrolet
86	Brandon Brown (R)	Brandonbilt Motorsports	Chevrolet
89	Morgan Shepherd	Shepherd Racing Ventures	Chevrolet
90	Caesar Bacarella	DGM Racing	Chevrolet
93	Josh Bilicki	RSS Racing	Chevrolet
98	Chase Briscoe (R)	Stewart-Haas Racing with Biagi-DenBeste Racing	Ford
99	Tommy Joe Martins	B. J. McLeod Motorsports	Toyota

== Practice ==
=== First practice ===
Cole Custer was the fastest in the first practice session with a time of 40.669 seconds and a speed of 177.039 mph (284.917 km/h).

Pos	No.	Driver	Team	Manufacturer	Time	Speed
1	00	Cole Custer	Stewart-Haas Racing with Biagi-DenBeste Racing	Ford	40.669	177.039
2	20	Christopher Bell	Joe Gibbs Racing	Toyota	40.705	176.882
3	18	Kyle Busch (i)	Joe Gibbs Racing	Toyota	40.828	176.350

=== Final practice ===
Justin Allgaier was the fastest in the final practice session with a time of 40.436 seconds and a speed of 178.059 mph (286.558 km/h).

Pos	No.	Driver	Team	Manufacturer	Time	Speed
1	7	Justin Allgaier	JR Motorsports	Chevrolet	40.436	178.059
2	2	Tyler Reddick	Richard Childress Racing	Chevrolet	40.646	177.139
3	20	Christopher Bell	Joe Gibbs Racing	Toyota	40.688	176.956

== Qualifying ==
Tyler Reddick scored the pole for the race with a time of 40.031 seconds and a speed of 179.861 mph (289.458 km/h).

=== Qualifying results ===
Pos	No	Driver	Team	Manufacturer	R1	R2
1	2	Tyler Reddick	Richard Childress Racing	Chevrolet	40.090	40.031
2	18	Kyle Busch (i)	Joe Gibbs Racing	Toyota	39.841	40.077
3	00	Cole Custer	Stewart-Haas Racing with Biagi-DenBeste Racing	Ford	40.108	40.248
4	20	Christopher Bell	Joe Gibbs Racing	Toyota	40.080	40.355
5	9	Noah Gragson (R)	JR Motorsports	Chevrolet	40.368	40.461
6	98	Chase Briscoe (R)	Stewart-Haas Racing with Biagi-DenBeste Racing	Ford	40.407	40.495
7	8	Ryan Preece (i)	JR Motorsports	Chevrolet	40.316	40.614
8	7	Justin Allgaier	JR Motorsports	Chevrolet	40.383	40.649
9	19	Brandon Jones	Joe Gibbs Racing	Toyota	40.695	40.674
10	23	John Hunter Nemechek (R)	GMS Racing	Chevrolet	40.535	40.707
11	22	Austin Cindric	Team Penske	Ford	40.718	40.963
12	11	Justin Haley (R)	Kaulig Racing	Chevrolet	40.609	41.096
13	51	Jeremy Clements	Jeremy Clements Racing	Chevrolet	40.816	—
14	39	Ryan Sieg	RSS Racing	Chevrolet	40.820	—
15	4	Ross Chastain	JD Motorsports	Chevrolet	40.918	—
16	1	Michael Annett	JR Motorsports	Chevrolet	40.970	—
17	08	Gray Gaulding (R)	SS-Green Light Racing	Chevrolet	41.559	—
18	86	Brandon Brown (R)	Brandonbilt Motorsports	Chevrolet	41.763	—
19	36	Josh Williams	DGM Racing	Chevrolet	41.901	—
20	35	Joey Gase	MBM Motorsports	Toyota	41.977	—
21	07	Ray Black Jr.	SS-Green Light Racing	Chevrolet	42.095	—
22	93	Josh Bilicki	RSS Racing	Chevrolet	42.180	—
23	99	Tommy Joe Martins	B. J. McLeod Motorsports	Toyota	42.182	—
24	42	Chad Finchum	MBM Motorsports	Toyota	42.231	—
25	0	Garrett Smithley	JD Motorsports	Chevrolet	42.282	—
26	66	Timmy Hill	MBM Motorsports	Toyota	42.408	—
27	15	B. J. McLeod	JD Motorsports	Chevrolet	42.635	—
28	52	David Starr	Jimmy Means Racing	Chevrolet	42.751	—
29	01	Stephen Leicht	JD Motorsports	Chevrolet	42.770	—
30	5	Matt Mills (R)	B. J. McLeod Motorsports	Chevrolet	42.920	—
31	17	Bayley Currey (i)	Rick Ware Racing	Chevrolet	43.040	—
32	38	Jeff Green	RSS Racing	Chevrolet	43.681	—
33	78	Vinnie Miller	B. J. McLeod Motorsports	Chevrolet	43.927	—
34	89	Morgan Shepherd	Shepherd Racing Ventures	Chevrolet	44.979	—
35	13	John Jackson	MBM Motorsports	Toyota	47.006	—
36	74	Mike Harmon	Mike Harmon Racing	Chevrolet	47.065	—
37	90	Caesar Bacarella	DGM Racing	Chevrolet	0.000	—

== Race ==
=== Stage Results ===
Stage One Laps: 35

Pos	No	Driver	Team	Manufacturer	Points
1	18	Kyle Busch (i)	Joe Gibbs Racing	Toyota	0
2	2	Tyler Reddick	Richard Childress Racing	Chevrolet	9
3	00	Cole Custer	Stewart-Haas Racing with Biagi-DenBeste	Ford	8
4	7	Justin Allgaier	JR Motorsports	Chevrolet	7
5	9	Noah Gragson (R)	JR Motorsports	Chevrolet	6
6	1	Michael Annett	JR Motorsports	Chevrolet	5
7	22	Austin Cindric	Team Penske	Ford	4
8	8	Ryan Preece (i)	JR Motorsports	Chevrolet	0
9	20	Christopher Bell	Joe Gibbs Racing	Toyota	2
10	39	Ryan Sieg	RSS Racing	Chevrolet	1

Stage Two Laps: 35

Pos	No	Driver	Team	Manufacturer	Points
1	18	Kyle Busch (i)	Joe Gibbs Racing	Toyota	0
2	2	Tyler Reddick	Richard Childress Racing	Chevrolet	9
3	7	Justin Allgaier	JR Motorsports	Chevrolet	8
4	00	Cole Custer	Stewart-Haas Racing with Biagi-DenBeste	Ford	7
5	19	Brandon Jones	Joe Gibbs Racing	Toyota	6
6	20	Christopher Bell	Joe Gibbs Racing	Toyota	5
7	8	Ryan Preece (i)	JR Motorsports	Chevrolet	0
8	22	Austin Cindric	Team Penske	Ford	3
9	1	Michael Annett	JR Motorsports	Chevrolet	2
10	98	Chase Briscoe (R)	Stewart-Haas Racing with Biagi-DenBeste	Ford	1

=== Final Stage Results ===
Stage Three Laps: 80

Pos	Grid	No	Driver	Team	Manufacturer	Laps	Points
1	3	00	Cole Custer	Stewart-Haas Racing with Biagi-DenBeste	Ford	150	55
2	2	18	Kyle Busch (i)	Joe Gibbs Racing	Toyota	150	0
3	4	20	Christopher Bell	Joe Gibbs Racing	Toyota	150	41
4	1	2	Tyler Reddick	Richard Childress Racing	Chevrolet	150	51
5	6	98	Chase Briscoe (R)	Stewart-Haas Racing with Biagi-DenBeste	Ford	150	33
6	11	22	Austin Cindric	Team Penske	Ford	150	38
7	9	19	Brandon Jones	Joe Gibbs Racing	Toyota	150	36
8	7	8	Ryan Preece (i)	JR Motorsports	Chevrolet	150	0
9	8	7	Justin Allgaier	JR Motorsports	Chevrolet	150	43
10	12	11	Justin Haley (R)	Kaulig Racing	Chevrolet	150	27
11	14	39	Ryan Sieg	RSS Racing	Chevrolet	150	27
12	5	9	Noah Gragson (R)	JR Motorsports	Chevrolet	150	31
13	16	1	Michael Annett	JR Motorsports	Chevrolet	150	31
14	13	51	Jeremy Clements	Jeremy Clements Racing	Chevrolet	150	23
15	18	86	Brandon Brown (R)	Brandonbilt Motorsports	Chevrolet	150	22
16	17	08	Gray Gaulding	SS-Green Light Racing	Chevrolet	150	21
17	21	07	Ray Black Jr.	SS-Green Light Racing	Chevrolet	148	20
18	15	4	Ross Chastain	JD Motorsports	Chevrolet	147	19
19	25	0	Garrett Smithley	JD Motorsports	Chevrolet	147	18
20	23	99	Tommy Joe Martins	B. J. McLeod Motorsports	Chevrolet	146	17
21	28	52	David Starr	Jimmy Means Racing	Chevrolet	146	16
22	29	01	Stephen Leicht	JD Motorsports	Chevrolet	145	15
23	30	5	Matt Mills (R)	B. J. McLeod Motorsports	Chevrolet	145	14
24	27	15	B. J. McLeod	JD Motorsports	Chevrolet	143	13
25	33	78	Vinnie Miller	B. J. McLeod Motorsports	Chevrolet	143	12
26	36	74	Mike Harmon	Mike Harmon Racing	Chevrolet	142	11
27	20	35	Joey Gase	MBM Motorsports	Toyota	141	10
28	10	23	John Hunter Nemechek (R)	GMS Racing	Chevrolet	82	9
29	22	93	Josh Bilicki	RSS Racing	Chevrolet	79	8
30	35	13	John Jackson	MBM Motorsports	Toyota	50	7
31	34	89	Morgan Shepherd	Shepherd Racing Ventures	Chevrolet	43	6
32	24	42	Chad Finchum	MBM Motorsports	Toyota	39	5
33	19	36	Josh Williams	DGM Racing	Chevrolet	37	4
34	26	66	Timmy Hill	MBM Motorsports	Toyota	34	3
35	31	17	Bayley Currey (i)	Rick Ware Racing	Chevrolet	14	0
36	32	38	Jeff Green	RSS Racing	Chevrolet	10	1
37	37	90	Caesar Bacarella	DGM Racing	Chevrolet	1	1

Previous race: 2019 iK9 Service Dog 200	NASCAR Xfinity Series; 2019 season	Next race: 2019 My Bariatric Solutions 300
