= 2019 Use Your Melon Drive Sober 200 =

Race details
- Race 29 of 33 in the 2019 NASCAR Xfinity Series season
- Date: October 5, 2019
- Location: Dover International Speedway in Dover, Delaware
- Course: Permanent racing facility
- Course length: 1 miles (1.6 km)
- Distance: 200 laps, 200 mi (320 km)

Pole position
Driver	Chase Briscoe	Stewart-Haas Racing with Biagi-DenBeste Racing
- Time: 22.894

Most laps led
Driver	Chase Briscoe	Stewart-Haas Racing with Biagi-DenBeste Racing
- Laps: 71

Winner
No. 00	Cole Custer	Stewart-Haas Racing with Biagi-DenBeste Racing

Television in the United States
- Network: NBCSN

Radio in the United States
- Radio: MRN

The 2019 Use Your Melon Drive Sober 200 is a NASCAR Xfinity Series race held on October 5, 2019, at Dover International Speedway in Dover, Delaware. Contested over 200 laps on the 1-mile (1.6 km) concrete speedway, it was the 29th race of the 2019 NASCAR Xfinity Series season, third race of the Playoffs, and the last race of the Round of 12.

== Background ==
=== Track ===
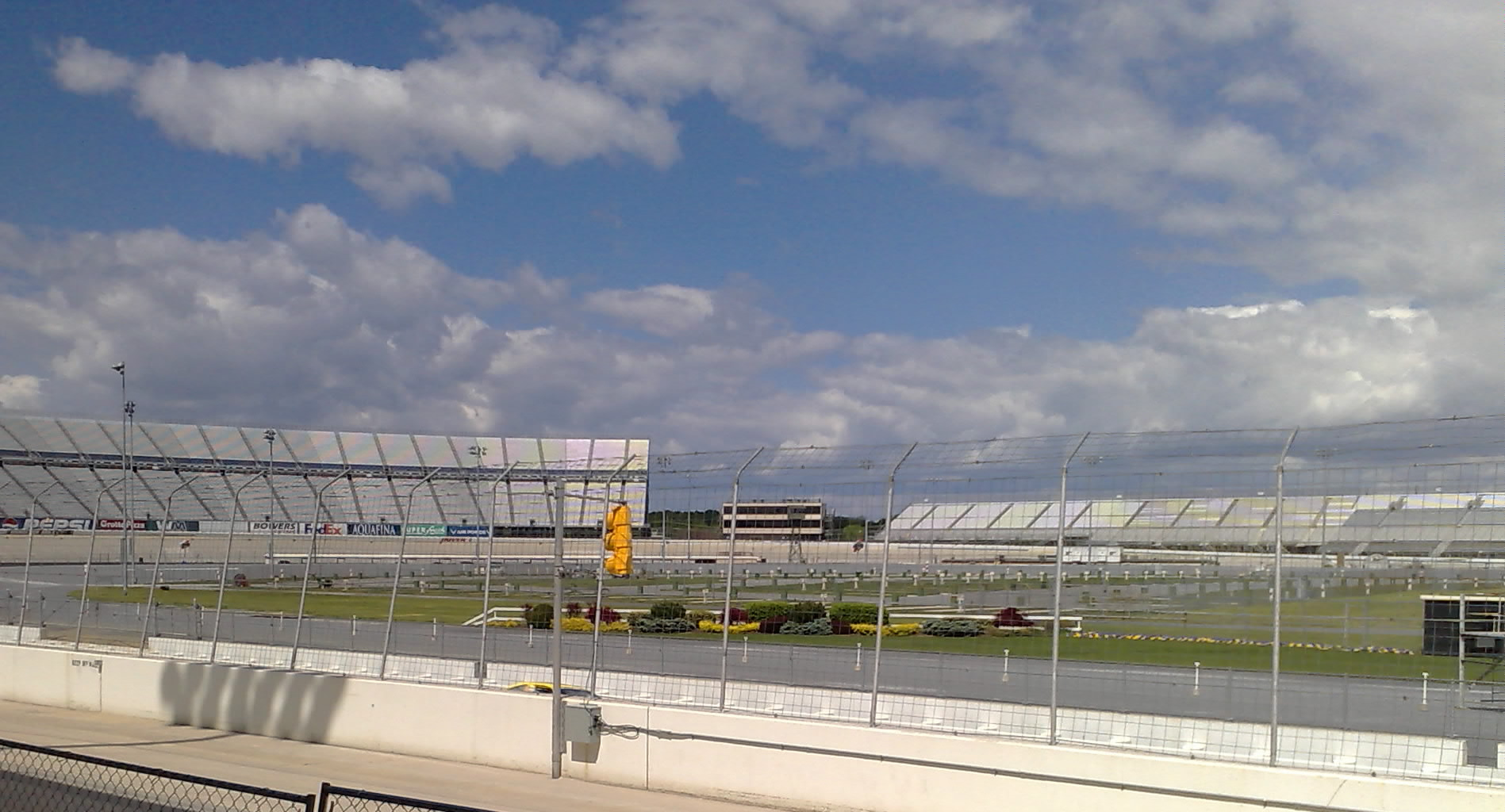
Dover International Speedway, the track where the race was held.

Dover International Speedway is an oval race track in Dover, Delaware, United States that has held at least two NASCAR races since it opened in 1969. In addition to NASCAR, the track also hosted USAC and the NTT IndyCar Series. The track features one layout, a 1 mile (1.6 km) concrete oval, with 24° banking in the turns and 9° banking on the straights. The speedway is owned and operated by Dover Motorsports.

== Entry list ==
No.	Driver	Team	Manufacturer
00	Cole Custer	Stewart-Haas Racing with Biagi-DenBeste Racing	Ford
0	Garrett Smithley	JD Motorsports	Chevrolet
01	Stephen Leicht	JD Motorsports	Chevrolet
1	Michael Annett	JR Motorsports	Chevrolet
2	Tyler Reddick	Richard Childress Racing	Chevrolet
4	Ross Chastain (i)	JD Motorsports	Chevrolet
5	Matt Mills	B. J. McLeod Motorsports	Chevrolet
07	Ray Black Jr.	SS-Green Light Racing	Chevrolet
7	Justin Allgaier	JR Motorsports	Chevrolet
08	Gray Gaulding (R)	SS-Green Light Racing	Chevrolet
8	Zane Smith	JR Motorsports	Chevrolet
9	Noah Gragson (R)	JR Motorsports	Chevrolet
11	Justin Haley (R)	Kaulig Racing	Chevrolet
13	Carl Long	MBM Motorsports	Toyota
15	B. J. McLeod	JD Motorsports	Chevrolet
17	Joe Nemechek (i)	Rick Ware Racing	Chevrolet
18	Harrison Burton (i)	Joe Gibbs Racing	Toyota
19	Brandon Jones	Joe Gibbs Racing	Toyota
20	Christopher Bell	Joe Gibbs Racing	Toyota
22	Austin Cindric	Team Penske	Ford
23	John Hunter Nemechek (R)	GMS Racing	Chevrolet
35	Joey Gase	MBM Motorsports	Toyota
36	Josh Williams	DGM Racing	Chevrolet
38	Bayley Currey (i)	RSS Racing	Chevrolet
39	Ryan Sieg	RSS Racing	Chevrolet
51	Jeremy Clements	Jeremy Clements Racing	Chevrolet
52	David Starr	Jimmy Means Racing	Chevrolet
53	Kyle Weatherman	Jimmy Means Racing	Chevrolet
61	Chad Finchum	MBM Motorsports	Toyota
66	Timmy Hill	MBM Motorsports	Toyota
74	Mike Harmon	Mike Harmon Racing	Chevrolet
78	Vinnie Miller	B. J. McLeod Motorsports	Chevrolet
86	Brandon Brown (R)	Brandonbilt Motorsports	Chevrolet
89	Landon Cassill	Shepherd Racing Ventures	Chevrolet
90	Dillon Bassett	DGM Racing	Chevrolet
93	J. J. Yeley	RSS Racing	Chevrolet
98	Chase Briscoe (R)	Stewart-Haas Racing with Biagi-DenBeste Racing	Ford
99	Stefan Parsons	B. J. McLeod Motorsports	Toyota
Official Entry List

== Practice ==
=== First practice ===
Chase Briscoe was the fastest in the first practice session with a time of 23.623 seconds and a speed of 152.394 mph (245.254 km/h).

Pos	No.	Driver	Team	Manufacturer	Time	Speed
1	98	Chase Briscoe (R)	Stewart-Haas Racing with Biagi-DenBeste Racing	Ford	23.623	152.394
2	20	Christopher Bell	Joe Gibbs Racing	Toyota	23.738	151.656
3	2	Tyler Reddick	Richard Childress Racing	Chevrolet	23.739	151.649

=== Final practice ===
Cole Custer was the fastest in the final practice session with a time of 23.795 seconds and a speed of 151.292 mph (243.481 km/h).

Pos	No.	Driver	Team	Manufacturer	Time	Speed
1	00	Cole Custer	Stewart-Haas Racing with Biagi-DenBeste Racing	Ford	23.795	151.292
2	98	Chase Briscoe (R)	Stewart-Haas Racing with Biagi-DenBeste Racing	Ford	23.911	150.558
3	18	Harrison Burton (i)	Joe Gibbs Racing	Toyota	23.917	150.521

== Qualifying ==
Chase Briscoe scored the pole for the race with a time of 22.894 seconds and a speed of 157.246 mph (253.063 km/h).

=== Qualifying results ===
Pos	No	Driver	Team	Manufacturer	Time
1	98	Chase Briscoe (R)	Stewart-Haas Racing with Biagi-DenBeste Racing	Ford	22.894
2	22	Austin Cindric	Team Penske	Ford	22.969
3	00	Cole Custer	Stewart-Haas Racing with Biagi-DenBeste Racing	Ford	22.976
4	2	Tyler Reddick	Richard Childress Racing	Chevrolet	23.009
5	18	Harrison Burton (i)	Joe Gibbs Racing	Toyota	23.097
6	20	Christopher Bell	Joe Gibbs Racing	Toyota	23.098
7	9	Noah Gragson (R)	JR Motorsports	Chevrolet	23.116
8	7	Justin Allgaier	JR Motorsports	Chevrolet	23.129
9	19	Brandon Jones	Joe Gibbs Racing	Toyota	23.143
10	8	Zane Smith	JR Motorsports	Chevrolet	23.158
11	11	Justin Haley (R)	Kaulig Racing	Chevrolet	23.209
12	89	Landon Cassill	Shepherd Racing Ventures	Chevrolet	23.337
13	51	Jeremy Clements	Jeremy Clements Racing	Chevrolet	23.348
14	4	Ross Chastain (i)	JD Motorsports	Chevrolet	23.386
15	39	Ryan Sieg	RSS Racing	Chevrolet	23.405
16	1	Michael Annett	JR Motorsports	Chevrolet	23.423
17	23	John Hunter Nemechek (R)	GMS Racing	Chevrolet	23.491
18	90	Dillon Bassett	DGM Racing	Chevrolet	23.543
19	15	B. J. McLeod	JD Motorsports	Chevrolet	23.614
20	0	Garrett Smithley	JD Motorsports	Chevrolet	23.737
21	86	Brandon Brown (R)	Brandonbilt Motorsports	Chevrolet	23.797
22	38	Bayley Currey (i)	RSS Racing	Chevrolet	23.799
23	99	Stefan Parsons	B. J. McLeod Motorsports	Toyota	23.810
24	17	Joe Nemechek	Rick Ware Racing	Chevrolet	23.821
25	08	Gray Gaulding (R)	SS-Green Light Racing	Chevrolet	23.865
26	78	Vinnie Miller	B. J. McLeod Motorsports	Chevrolet	23.883
27	66	Timmy Hill	MBM Motorsports	Toyota	23.945
28	07	Ray Black Jr.	SS-Green Light Racing	Chevrolet	23.994
29	93	J. J. Yeley	RSS Racing	Chevrolet	24.008
30	61	Chad Finchum	MBM Motorsports	Toyota	24.105
31	01	Stephen Leicht	JD Motorsports	Chevrolet	24.245
32	13	Carl Long	MBM Motorsports	Toyota	24.279
33	52	David Starr	Jimmy Means Racing	Chevrolet	24.365
34	5	Matt Mills	B. J. McLeod Motorsports	Chevrolet	24.386
35	36	Josh Williams	DGM Racing	Chevrolet	24.469
36	53	Kyle Weatherman	Jimmy Means Racing	Chevrolet	24.609
37	35	Joey Gase	MBM Motorsports	Toyota	24.791
38	74	Mike Harmon	Mike Harmon Racing	Chevrolet	24.873

. – Playoffs driver

== Race ==
Chase Briscoe started at the rear of the field due to electrical issues, so Austin Cindric started on pole. On the second lap, Tyler Reddick slid on the frontstretch and Justin Allgaier followed, causing Harrison Burton and Brandon Jones to wreck behind them. This wreck caused Jones to be eliminated from the playoffs. On lap 22, John Hunter Nemechek spun Mike Harmon and brought out the second caution. Allgaier took the lead and won Stage 1.

Allgaier continued his lead to win Stage 2. Briscoe took the lead afterwards and dominated. Cole Custer, Michael Annett, and Justin Haley stayed out late in the pit cycle, which proved to be beneficial when Dillon Bassett caused a caution when he spun entering pit road. Allgaier got the free pass, while Briscoe and Cindric took the wave-around, causing only six cars to be on the lead lap during the restart.

Custer sped past Allgaier on the restart, then remained in the lead after the last one caused by Stephen Leicht, Matt Mills, and Ray Black Jr. being involved in an accident with seven laps left. Custer held off Allgaier to take the race win. With Jones eliminated in the opening laps, Nemechek needed Annett to struggle in order to pass him in points while Haley and Ryan Sieg needed to win the race to advance. Since Nemechek didn't gain 10 points more than Annett, he was eliminated from the playoffs alongside Haley and Sieg.

=== Stage Results ===
Stage One Laps: 60

Pos	No	Driver	Team	Manufacturer	Points
1	7	Justin Allgaier	JR Motorsports	Chevrolet	10
2	00	Cole Custer	Stewart-Haas Racing with Biagi-DenBeste	Ford	9
3	22	Austin Cindric	Team Penske	Ford	8
4	8	Zane Smith	JR Motorsports	Chevrolet	7
5	11	Justin Haley (R)	Kaulig Racing	Chevrolet	6
6	9	Noah Gragson (R)	JR Motorsports	Chevrolet	5
7	98	Chase Briscoe (R)	Stewart-Haas Racing with Biagi-DenBeste	Ford	4
8	39	Ryan Sieg	RSS Racing	Chevrolet	3
9	23	John Hunter Nemechek (R)	GMS Racing	Chevrolet	2
10	1	Michael Annett	JR Motorsports	Chevrolet	1

Stage Two Laps: 60

Pos	No	Driver	Team	Manufacturer	Points
1	7	Justin Allgaier	JR Motorsports	Chevrolet	10
2	22	Austin Cindric	Team Penske	Ford	9
3	98	Chase Briscoe (R)	Stewart-Haas Racing with Biagi-DenBeste	Ford	8
4	9	Noah Gragson (R)	JR Motorsports	Chevrolet	7
5	00	Cole Custer	Stewart-Haas Racing with Biagi-DenBeste	Ford	6
6	8	Zane Smith	JR Motorsports	Chevrolet	5
7	23	John Hunter Nemechek (R)	GMS Racing	Chevrolet	4
8	11	Justin Haley (R)	Kaulig Racing	Chevrolet	3
9	1	Michael Annett	JR Motorsports	Chevrolet	2
10	39	Ryan Sieg	RSS Racing	Chevrolet	1

=== Final Stage Results ===
Stage Three Laps: 80

Pos	Grid	No	Driver	Team	Manufacturer	Laps	Points
1	3	00	Cole Custer	Stewart-Haas Racing with Biagi-DenBeste	Ford	200	55
2	8	7	Justin Allgaier	JR Motorsports	Chevrolet	200	55
3	2	22	Austin Cindric	Team Penske	Ford	200	51
4	11	11	Justin Haley (R)	Kaulig Racing	Chevrolet	200	42
5	1	98	Chase Briscoe (R)	Stewart-Haas Racing with Biagi-DenBeste	Ford	200	44
6	16	1	Michael Annett	JR Motorsports	Chevrolet	200	34
7	7	9	Noah Gragson (R)	JR Motorsports	Chevrolet	200	42
8	17	23	John Hunter Nemechek (R)	GMS Racing	Chevrolet	199	35
9	10	8	Zane Smith	JR Motorsports	Chevrolet	199	40
10	15	39	Ryan Sieg	RSS Racing	Chevrolet	199	31
11	21	86	Brandon Brown (R)	Brandonbilt Motorsports	Chevrolet	198	26
12	4	2	Tyler Reddick	Richard Childress Racing	Chevrolet	198	25
13	14	4	Ross Chastain (i)	JD Motorsports	Chevrolet	198	0
14	18	90	Dillon Bassett	DGM Racing	Chevrolet	198	23
15	35	36	Josh Williams	DGM Racing	Chevrolet	198	22
16	19	15	B. J. McLeod	JD Motorsports	Chevrolet	197	21
17	28	07	Ray Black Jr.	SS-Green Light Racing	Chevrolet	197	20
18	25	08	Gray Gaulding	SS-Green Light Racing	Chevrolet	196	19
19	23	99	Stefan Parsons	B. J. McLeod Motorsports	Toyota	196	18
20	26	78	Vinnie Miller	B. J. McLeod Motorsports	Chevrolet	196	17
21	33	52	David Starr	Jimmy Means Racing	Chevrolet	195	16
22	37	35	Joey Gase	MBM Motorsports	Toyota	194	15
23	31	01	Stephen Leicht	JD Motorsports	Chevrolet	183	14
24	34	5	Matt Mills	B. J. McLeod Motorsports	Chevrolet	183	13
25	6	20	Christopher Bell	Joe Gibbs Racing	Toyota	166	12
26	20	0	Garrett Smithley	JD Motorsports	Chevrolet	104	11
27	27	66	Timmy Hill	MBM Motorsports	Toyota	62	10
28	32	13	Carl Long	MBM Motorsports	Toyota	56	9
29	12	89	Landon Cassill	Shepherd Racing Ventures	Chevrolet	55	8
30	24	17	Joe Nemechek (i)	Rick Ware Racing	Chevrolet	53	0
31	30	61	Chad Finchum	MBM Motorsports	Toyota	33	6
32	29	93	J. J. Yeley	RSS Racing	Chevrolet	27	5
33	22	38	Bayley Currey (i)	RSS Racing	Chevrolet	23	0
34	38	74	Mike Harmon	Mike Harmon Racing	Chevrolet	19	3
35	36	53	Kyle Weatherman	Jimmy Means Racing	Chevrolet	12	2
36	13	51	Jeremy Clements	Jeremy Clements Racing	Chevrolet	9	1
37	9	19	Brandon Jones	Joe Gibbs Racing	Toyota	2	1
38	5	18	Harrison Burton (i)	Joe Gibbs Racing	Toyota	2	0

. – Driver advanced to the next round of the playoffs.

. – Driver was eliminated from the playoffs.

Previous race: 2019 Drive for the Cure 250	NASCAR Xfinity Series; 2019 season	Next race: 2019 Kansas Lottery 300
