= Michael Munley =

American racing driver

- Born: Michael R. Munley; December 27, 1998 (age 27); South Riding, Virginia, U.S.

NASCAR O'Reilly Auto Parts Series career
- 1 race run over 1 year
- 2021 position: 70th
- Best finish: 70th (2021)
- First race: 2021 Skrewball Peanut Butter Whiskey 200 at The Glen (Watkins Glen)
Wins	Top tens	Poles
0	0	0
- Statistics up to date as of December 27, 2021.

Michael R. Munley (born December 27, 1998) is an American professional racing driver. He last competed part-time in the NASCAR Xfinity Series driving the No. 6 Chevrolet Camaro for JD Motorsports.

== Racing career ==
On August 5, 2021, it was announced that Munley would make his debut in the NASCAR Xfinity Series in the race at Watkins Glen International. He would drive the JD Motorsports No. 6 car. Munley started the race in 34th, finishing in 35th due to a suspension issue.

== Motorsports career results ==
=== NASCAR ===
(key) (Bold – Pole position awarded by qualifying time. Italics – Pole position earned by points standings or practice time. * – Most laps led.)

==== Xfinity Series ====
NASCAR Xfinity Series results
Year	Team	No.	Make	1	2	3	4	5	6	7	8	9	10	11	12	13	14	15	16	17	18	19	20	21	22	23	24	25	26	27	28	29	30	31	32	33	NXSC	Pts	Ref
2021	JD Motorsports	6	Chevy	DAY	DAY	HOM	LVS	PHO	ATL	MAR}	TAL	DAR	DOV	COA	CLT	MOH	TEX	NSH	POC	ROA	ATL	NHA	GLN; 35	IND	MCH	DAY	DAR	RCH	BRI	LVS	TAL	CLT	TEX	KAN	MAR	PHO	70th	2	

^{*} Season still in progress
^{1} Ineligible for series points
