= 2021 Skrewball Peanut Butter Whiskey 200 at The Glen =

2021 NASCAR Xfinity Series

Race details
- Race 20 of 33 in the 2021 NASCAR Xfinity Series
- Date: August 7, 2021
- Location: Watkins Glen, New York, Watkins Glen International
- Course: Permanent racing facility
- Course length: 2.45 miles (3.943 km)
- Distance: 82 laps, 200.9 mi (323.317 km)
- Average speed: 84.088 miles per hour (135.327 km/h)

Pole position
Driver	Justin Allgaier	JR Motorsports

Most laps led
Driver	Ty Gibbs	Joe Gibbs Racing
- Laps: 43

Winner
No. 54	Ty Gibbs	Joe Gibbs Racing

Television in the United States
- Network: CNBC
- Announcers: Booth: Rick Allen, Steve Letarte; The Esses: Mike Bagley; Carousel: Dale Earnhardt Jr. Turn 6: Jeff Burton

Radio in the United States
- Radio: Motor Racing Network

The 2021 Skrewball Peanut Butter Whiskey 200 at The Glen was the 20th stock car race of the 2021 NASCAR Xfinity Series, and the 27th iteration of the event. The event was held on Saturday, August 7, 2021, in Watkins Glen, New York at Watkins Glen International, a 2.45 miles (3.94 km) permanent road course. The race took 82 laps to complete. Ty Gibbs, running a part time schedule for Joe Gibbs Racing, would win his 3rd race of the year and of his career for the series. A. J. Allmendinger of Kaulig Racing and Austin Cindric of Team Penske would score the rest of the podium positions, scoring 2nd and 3rd, respectively.

The layout of Watkins Glen International NASCAR uses.

== Background ==
Watkins Glen International (nicknamed "The Glen") is an automobile race track located in Watkins Glen, New York at the southern tip of Seneca Lake. It was long known around the world as the home of the Formula One United States Grand Prix, which it hosted for twenty consecutive years (1961–1980), but the site has been home to road racing of nearly every class, including the World Sportscar Championship, Trans-Am, Can-Am, NASCAR Sprint Cup Series, the International Motor Sports Association and the IndyCar Series.

Initially, public roads in the village were used for the race course. In 1956 a permanent circuit for the race was built. In 1968 the race was extended to six hours, becoming the 6 Hours of Watkins Glen. The circuit's current layout has more or less been the same since 1971, although a chicane was installed at the uphill Esses in 1975 to slow cars through these corners, where there was a fatality during practice at the 1973 United States Grand Prix. The chicane was removed in 1985, but another chicane called the "Inner Loop" was installed in 1992 after J.D. McDuffie's fatal accident during the previous year's NASCAR Winston Cup event.

The circuit is known as the Mecca of North American road racing and is a very popular venue among fans and drivers. The facility is currently owned by International Speedway Corporation.

=== Entry list ===
#	Driver	Team	Make
0	Jeffrey Earnhardt	JD Motorsports	Chevrolet
1	Michael Annett	JR Motorsports	Chevrolet
2	Myatt Snider	Richard Childress Racing	Chevrolet
02	Brett Moffitt	Our Motorsports	Chevrolet
4	Landon Cassill	JD Motorsports	Chevrolet
5	Matt Mills	B. J. McLeod Motorsports	Toyota
6	Michael Munley	JD Motorsports	Chevrolet
7	Justin Allgaier	JR Motorsports	Chevrolet
07	Joe Graf Jr.	SS-Green Light Racing	Chevrolet
8	Sam Mayer	JR Motorsports	Chevrolet
9	Noah Gragson	JR Motorsports	Chevrolet
10	Jeb Burton	Kaulig Racing	Chevrolet
11	Justin Haley	Kaulig Racing	Chevrolet
13	David Starr	MBM Motorsports	Toyota
15	Colby Howard	JD Motorsports	Chevrolet
16	A. J. Allmendinger	Kaulig Racing	Chevrolet
17	Josh Bilicki	SS-Green Light Racing with Rick Ware Racing	Chevrolet
18	Daniel Hemric	Joe Gibbs Racing	Toyota
19	Brandon Jones	Joe Gibbs Racing	Toyota
20	Harrison Burton	Joe Gibbs Racing	Toyota
22	Austin Cindric	Team Penske	Ford
23	Austin Dillon	Our Motorsports	Chevrolet
26	Kris Wright	Sam Hunt Racing	Toyota
31	Erik Jones	Jordan Anderson Racing	Chevrolet
36	Alex Labbé	DGM Racing	Chevrolet
39	Ryan Sieg	RSS Racing	Ford
44	Tommy Joe Martins	Martins Motorsports	Chevrolet
47	Kyle Weatherman	Mike Harmon Racing	Chevrolet
48	Jade Buford	Big Machine Racing Team	Chevrolet
51	Jeremy Clements	Jeremy Clements Racing	Chevrolet
52	Dave Smith	Jimmy Means Racing	Chevrolet
54	Ty Gibbs	Joe Gibbs Racing	Toyota
61	Stephen Leicht	Hattori Racing Enterprises	Toyota
66	Timmy Hill	MBM Motorsports	Chevrolet
68	Brandon Brown	Brandonbilt Motorsports	Chevrolet
74	Bayley Currey	Mike Harmon Racing	Chevrolet
78	Jesse Little	B. J. McLeod Motorsports	Chevrolet
90	Preston Pardus	DGM Racing	Chevrolet
92	Josh Williams	DGM Racing	Chevrolet
98	Riley Herbst	Stewart-Haas Racing	Ford
99	Kyle Tilley	B. J. McLeod Motorsports	Chevrolet
Official entry list

== Starting lineup ==
The starting lineup was determined by a formula based on the previous race, the 2021 Ambetter Get Vaccinated 200. As a result, Justin Allgaier won the pole.

Pos.	#	Driver	Team	Make
1	7	Justin Allgaier	JR Motorsports	Chevrolet
2	22	Austin Cindric	Team Penske	Ford
3	18	Daniel Hemric	Joe Gibbs Racing	Toyota
4	20	Harrison Burton	Joe Gibbs Racing	Toyota
5	11	Justin Haley	Kaulig Racing	Chevrolet
6	16	A.J. Allmendinger	Kaulig Racing	Chevrolet
7	2	Myatt Snider	Richard Childress Racing	Chevrolet
8	10	Jeb Burton	Kaulig Racing	Chevrolet
9	02	Brett Moffitt	Our Motorsports	Chevrolet
10	98	Riley Herbst	Stewart-Haas Racing	Ford
11	9	Noah Gragson	JR Motorsports	Chevrolet
12	51	Jeremy Clements	Jeremy Clements Racing	Chevrolet
13	39	Ryan Sieg	RSS Racing	Ford
14	68	Brandon Brown	Brandonbilt Motorsports	Chevrolet
15	54	Ty Gibbs	Joe Gibbs Racing	Toyota
16	48	Jade Buford	Big Machine Racing Team	Chevrolet
17	44	Tommy Joe Martins	Martins Motorsports	Chevrolet
18	1	Michael Annett	JR Motorsports	Chevrolet
19	92	Josh Williams	DGM Racing	Chevrolet
20	4	Landon Cassill	JD Motorsports	Chevrolet
21	19	Brandon Jones	Joe Gibbs Racing	Toyota
22	47	Kyle Weatherman	Mike Harmon Racing	Chevrolet
23	8	Sam Mayer	JR Motorsports	Chevrolet
24	26	Kris Wright	Sam Hunt Racing	Toyota
25	07	Joe Graf, Jr.	SS-Green Light Racing	Chevrolet
26	36	Alex Labbé	DGM Racing	Chevrolet
27	78	Jesse Little	B. J. McLeod Motorsports	Chevrolet
28	0	Jeffrey Earnhardt	JD Motorsports	Chevrolet
29	5	Matt Mills	B. J. McLeod Motorsports	Toyota
30	17	Josh Bilicki	SS-Green Light Racing with Rick Ware Racing	Chevrolet
31	15	Colby Howard	JD Motorsports	Chevrolet
32	66	Timmy Hill	MBM Motorsports	Chevrolet
33	23	Austin Dillon	Our Motorsports	Chevrolet
34	6	Michael Munley	JD Motorsports	Chevrolet
35	90	Preston Pardus	DGM Racing	Chevrolet
36	31	Erik Jones	Jordan Anderson Racing	Chevrolet
37	99	Kyle Tilley	B. J. McLeod Motorsports	Chevrolet
38	52	Dave Smith	Jimmy Means Racing	Chevrolet
39	74	Bayley Currey	Mike Harmon Racing	Chevrolet
40	61	Stephen Leicht	Hattori Racing Enterprises	Toyota
Failed to qualify
41	13	David Starr	MBM Motorsports	Toyota
Official starting lineup

== Race results ==
Stage 1 Laps: 20

Fin	#	Driver	Team	Make	Pts
1	22	Austin Cindric	Team Penske	Ford	10
2	16	A.J. Allmendinger	Kaulig Racing	Chevrolet	9
3	18	Daniel Hemric	Joe Gibbs Racing	Toyota	8
4	20	Harrison Burton	Joe Gibbs Racing	Toyota	7
5	10	Jeb Burton	Kaulig Racing	Chevrolet	6
6	11	Justin Haley	Kaulig Racing	Chevrolet	5
7	9	Noah Gragson	JR Motorsports	Chevrolet	4
8	19	Brandon Jones	Joe Gibbs Racing	Toyota	3
9	98	Riley Herbst	Stewart-Haas Racing	Ford	2
10	8	Sam Mayer	JR Motorsports	Chevrolet	1

Stage 2 Laps: 20

Fin	#	Driver	Team	Make	Pts
1	16	A.J. Allmendinger	Kaulig Racing	Chevrolet	10
2	54	Ty Gibbs	Joe Gibbs Racing	Toyota	9
3	22	Austin Cindric	Team Penske	Ford	8
4	7	Justin Allgaier	JR Motorsports	Chevrolet	7
5	9	Noah Gragson	JR Motorsports	Chevrolet	6
6	98	Riley Herbst	Stewart-Haas Racing	Ford	5
7	8	Sam Mayer	JR Motorsports	Chevrolet	4
8	1	Michael Annett	JR Motorsports	Chevrolet	3
9	31	Erik Jones	Jordan Anderson Racing	Chevrolet	0
10	18	Daniel Hemric	Joe Gibbs Racing	Toyota	1

Stage 3 Laps: 42

Fin	St	#	Driver	Team	Make	Laps	Led	Status	Pts
1	15	54	Ty Gibbs	Joe Gibbs Racing	Toyota	82	43	running	49
2	6	16	A.J. Allmendinger	Kaulig Racing	Chevrolet	82	6	running	54
3	2	22	Austin Cindric	Team Penske	Ford	82	22	running	52
4	1	7	Justin Allgaier	JR Motorsports	Chevrolet	82	0	running	40
5	4	20	Harrison Burton	Joe Gibbs Racing	Toyota	82	3	running	39
6	21	19	Brandon Jones	Joe Gibbs Racing	Toyota	82	1	running	34
7	11	9	Noah Gragson	JR Motorsports	Chevrolet	82	0	running	40
8	8	10	Jeb Burton	Kaulig Racing	Chevrolet	82	0	running	35
9	5	11	Justin Haley	Kaulig Racing	Chevrolet	82	0	running	33
10	23	8	Sam Mayer	JR Motorsports	Chevrolet	82	0	running	32
11	18	1	Michael Annett	JR Motorsports	Chevrolet	82	0	running	29
12	14	68	Brandon Brown	Brandonbilt Motorsports	Chevrolet	82	0	running	25
13	10	98	Riley Herbst	Stewart-Haas Racing	Ford	82	0	running	31
14	19	92	Josh Williams	DGM Racing	Chevrolet	82	0	running	23
15	7	2	Myatt Snider	Richard Childress Racing	Chevrolet	82	0	running	22
16	12	51	Jeremy Clements	Jeremy Clements Racing	Chevrolet	82	0	running	21
17	24	26	Kris Wright	Sam Hunt Racing	Toyota	82	0	running	0
18	13	39	Ryan Sieg	RSS Racing	Ford	82	0	running	19
19	17	44	Tommy Joe Martins	Martins Motorsports	Chevrolet	82	0	running	18
20	20	4	Landon Cassill	JD Motorsports	Chevrolet	82	0	running	17
21	16	48	Jade Buford	Big Machine Racing Team	Chevrolet	82	0	running	16
22	3	18	Daniel Hemric	Joe Gibbs Racing	Toyota	82	7	running	24
23	35	90	Preston Pardus	DGM Racing	Chevrolet	82	0	running	14
24	30	17	Josh Bilicki	SS-Green Light Racing with Rick Ware Racing	Chevrolet	82	0	running	0
25	28	0	Jeffrey Earnhardt	JD Motorsports	Chevrolet	82	0	running	12
26	9	02	Brett Moffitt	Our Motorsports	Chevrolet	82	0	running	11
27	27	78	Jesse Little	B. J. McLeod Motorsports	Chevrolet	82	0	running	10
28	40	61	Stephen Leicht	Hattori Racing Enterprises	Toyota	82	0	running	9
29	32	66	Timmy Hill	MBM Motorsports	Chevrolet	81	0	running	0
30	25	07	Joe Graf, Jr.	SS-Green Light Racing	Chevrolet	81	0	running	7
31	31	15	Colby Howard	JD Motorsports	Chevrolet	81	0	running	6
32	39	74	Bayley Currey	Mike Harmon Racing	Chevrolet	81	0	running	0
33	38	52	Dave Smith	Jimmy Means Racing	Chevrolet	80	0	running	4
34	22	47	Kyle Weatherman	Mike Harmon Racing	Chevrolet	75	0	electrical	3
35	34	6	Michael Munley	JD Motorsports	Chevrolet	74	0	running	2
36	36	31	Erik Jones	Jordan Anderson Racing	Chevrolet	66	0	accident	0
37	33	23	Austin Dillon	Our Motorsports	Chevrolet	53	0	chassis	0
38	29	5	Matt Mills	B. J. McLeod Motorsports	Toyota	47	0	accident	1
39	26	36	Alex Labbé	DGM Racing	Chevrolet	28	0	rear gear	1
40	37	99	Kyle Tilley	B. J. McLeod Motorsports	Chevrolet	20	0	dvp	0
Failed to qualify
41		13	David Starr	MBM Motorsports	Toyota				
Official race results

Previous race: 2021 Ambetter Get Vaccinated 200	NASCAR Xfinity Series; 2021 season	Next race: 2021 Pennzoil 150
