= JD Motorsports =

Defunct auto race team

- Owner: Johnny Davis
- Base: Gaffney, South Carolina
- Series: NASCAR Xfinity Series
- Manufacturer: Chevrolet
- Opened: 1983
- Closed: 2024

Career
- Debut: 1983 Goody's 300 (Daytona)
- Latest race: 2024 Explore the Pocono Mountains 225 (Pocono)
- Races competed: 706
- Drivers' Championships: 0
- Race victories: 0
- Pole positions: 0

JD Motorsports was an American professional stock car racing team that competed in the NASCAR Xfinity Series. It was owned and operated by Johnny Davis. It last fielded the No. 4 part-time for multiple drivers. The team utilized engines from Clements Racing Engines and was one of the oldest teams in the sport, having competed in the very first official NASCAR Xfinity Series race, the 1983 Goody's 300.

Johnny Davis has been affiliated with NASCAR competition for over 30 years, serving as a crew member, fabricator, and then crew chief for several Cup Series and Xfinity Series teams. Davis' first foray into team ownership was with competition Go-Karts in the 1990s. The team has since expanded and is located in a state-of-the-art 40,000+ square foot facility in Gaffney, South Carolina. The team made history by having the first female crew chief in 2008 and building the first Nationwide Series Car of Tomorrow. In July 2024, it was reported that JD Motorsports had filed for Chapter 11 bankruptcy back in April 2024 and that they laid off several of their employees.

== History ==
=== Car No. 0 history ===
Kertus Davis (2002)

The No. 0 car made its debut in 2002, fielding an entry for Davis' son Kertus. In his first race, he started 31st but finished 32nd after a wreck. He ran three more races that season and had the best finish of twenty-fourth at Memphis Motorsports Park after gaining sponsorship from Broadway Motors.

Morgan Shepherd and Jason White (2003)

In 2003, Eagle Jet International became the team's new sponsor, and Morgan Shepherd was hired as the team's driver for most of its races. His best finish came at Talladega Superspeedway, where he finished 11th, when J. R. Robbs took over for three races with a best finish of 27th. Jason White then became the team's regular driver, and Shepherd moved to Davis' new No. 70 team. White drove for most of the season and had two top-twenty finishes in the No. 0 car, before Gus Wasson finished out the year in the car, finishing 29th at Atlanta Motor Speedway.

Multiple drivers (2004)

In 2004, Jimmy Kitchens drove the No. 0 car for the first four races of the season, but did not finish a race. Greg Sacks and Blake Mallory attempted a few races in the car but did not qualify. Mike Potter drove the car for two races before Kertus Davis came back to drive three times late in the season.

Kertus Davis (2005–2006)

For the 2005 season, Kertus Davis began driving the No. 0 full-time with Race Girl sponsoring. He competed in twenty-eight races with a top-ten at Talladega for his rookie season, and Rafael Martínez and Joe Fox served as relief drivers on road courses.

The team began the 2006 season under rumors that they would close due to sponsorship issues but remained open. Davis qualified for twenty-two races in that year, sharing the ride with Randy LaJoie and Morgan Shepherd.

Eric McClure (2007)

Kertus Davis left for Kevin Harvick Incorporated in 2007 and was replaced by Eric McClure and Hefty sponsorship. J. R. Fitzpatrick drove at Mexico City and Montreal, while Kevin Lepage driving at Watkins Glen. At the end of the 2007 season, McClure and his sponsorship departed for Front Row Motorsports. Due to a lack of sponsorship, it was announced on Jayski's Silly Season Site that JDM's equipment would be auctioned off on December 1, although the team remained open.

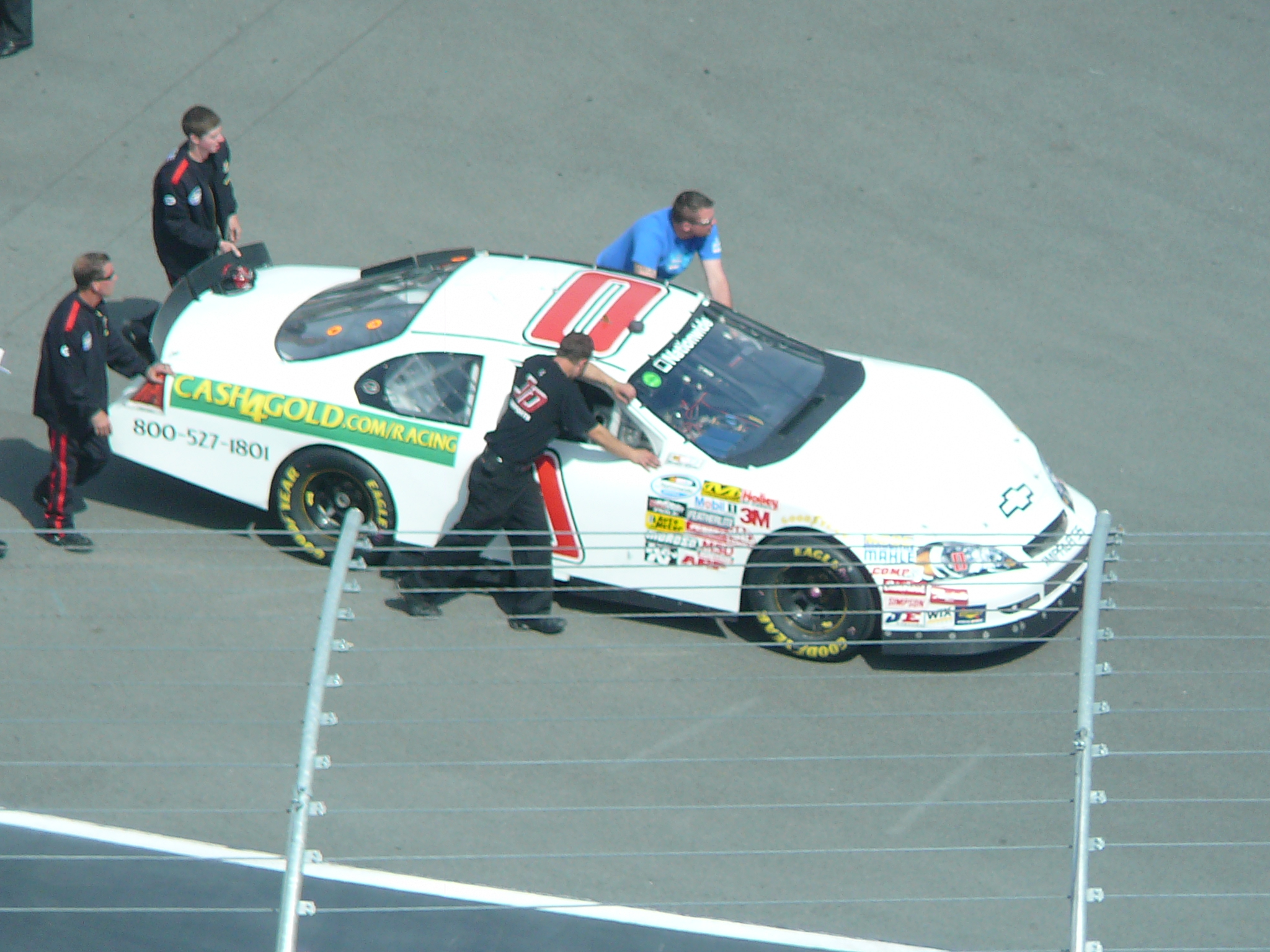
In 2009, Steve Grissom drove this car

Multiple drivers (2008–2011)

The No. 0 team began the 2008 season with Kertus Davis qualifying at Daytona, however, his time was disallowed and he moved to the No. 01. Since Daytona, Dwayne Leik has run four races, Mike Potter has run two races, Danny Efland has been in the car for five races and Davis returned to the No. 0 car at Dover for one race. Larry Gunselman drove the car regularly for the balance of the season, with Wheeler Boys filling in on road courses. Danny O’Quinn Jr. began the season as the driver of the No. 0 car but moved over to the No. 01 after one race. J. C. Stout, Robert Richardson, Mark Green and Steve Grissom shared the car before Mike Wallace took over the driving duties. The team starts and parks on occasion in 2009, however, the team did manage to finish at Kentucky. After Wallace moved to the 01, Andy Lally, Stout and Jeremy Clements drove.

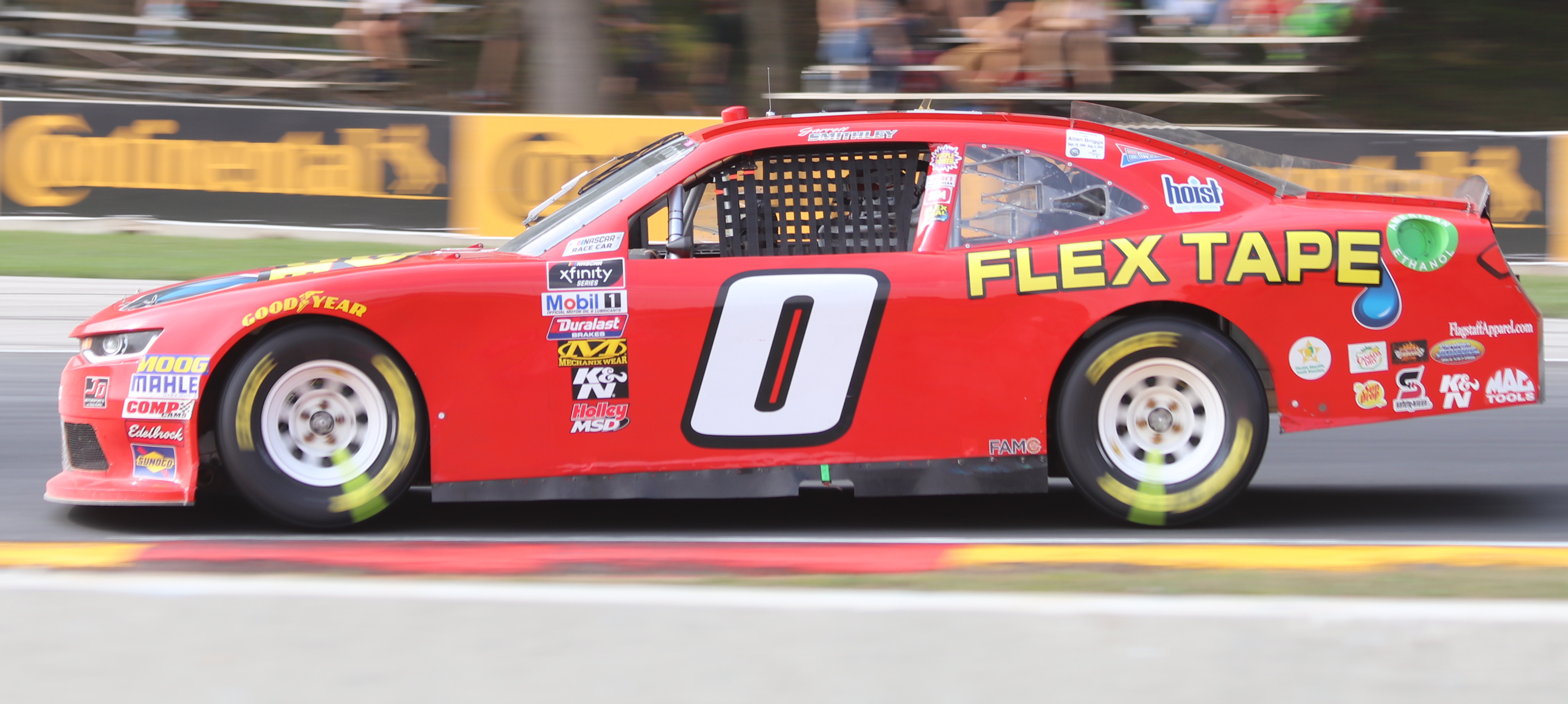
Garrett Smithley in 2018

In 2011, James Hylton ran the car at Darlington as a start and park. Tim Schendel and Brad Teague also started and parked at Iowa and Dover respectively.

Harrison Rhodes (2015)

For 2015, JD Motorsports announced that Harrison Rhodes would be their third full-time driver with the No. 0 Chevrolet Camaro. ARCA regular Bobby Gerhart would replace Rhodes in the 0 while he is driving the 4 with Ross Chastain being moved to the 01. Rhodes finished in the top 10 at Daytona, the same race where teammate Garrett Smithley finished fifth.

Garrett Smithley (2016–2019)

The following year, Eric McClure, who previously drove this team since 2007, joined the team for the season opener at Daytona in the No. 0, while Garrett Smithley took over the week after, competing for Rookie of the Year honors. From 2016 to 2019 Smithley drove most races in the 0, producing a best finish of fifth at Daytona in 2017, before getting replaced by B. J. McLeod in 2020.

Jeffrey Earnhardt (2020–2021)

B. J. McLeod drove this car for the first 4 races this season before moving to the 6 car. Jeffrey Earnhardt later drove this car for the rest of the season except road-course tracks while Mike Wallace drove this car. Wallace was later suspended indefinitely by NASCAR for actions detrimental to stock car racing, which led Jeffrey Earnhardt to run the car for the rest of the season, including Talladega. Earnhardt returned in 2021 but left to join Sam Hunt Racing's No. 24 and 26 cars on a limited schedule for the 2022 season.

==== Car No. 0 results ====
Year	Driver	No.	Make	1	2	3	4	5	6	7	8	9	10	11	12	13	14	15	16	17	18	19	20	21	22	23	24	25	26	27	28	29	30	31	32	33	34	35	Owners	Pts
2002	Kertus Davis	0	Chevy	DAY	CAR	LVS	DAR	BRI	TEX	NSH	TAL	CAL	RCH	NHA	NZH	CLT	DOV	NSH	KEN	MLW; 32	DAY	CHI	GTY; DNQ	PPR				DAR; 31	RCH	DOV	KAN	CLT	MEM; 24	ATL	CAR; 41	PHO	HOM; DNQ		N/A	N/A
2002	Brad Teague	0	Chevy																						IRP; 24	MCH	BRI												N/A	N/A
2003	Morgan Shepherd	0	Chevy	DAY	CAR; 40	LVS; DNQ	DAR; 27	BRI; 39	TEX; 33	TAL; 11		CAL; 41	RCH; 35			CLT; DNQ																							N/A	N/A
2003	Jason White	0	Chevy								NSH; 21							NSH; 17	KEN; 25	MLW; 27	DAY; 26	CHI; 23	NHA; 22	PPR; 20		MCH; 32		DAR; 30	RCH; 30	DOV; 23	KAN; 35	CLT; 35	MEM; 41						N/A	N/A
2003	J. R. Robbs	0	Chevy											GTY; 27	RCH; 36		DOV; 37																						N/A	N/A
2003	Dude Teate	0	Chevy																						IRP; 22														N/A	N/A
2003	Jay Sommers	0	Chevy																								BRI; 28												N/A	N/A
2003	Gus Wasson	0	Chevy																															ATL; 29	PHO; 31	CAR; 34	HOM; 34		N/A	N/A
2004	Jimmy Kitchens	0	Chevy	DAY; 33	CAR; 42	LVS; 40	DAR; 39																																N/A	N/A
2004	Mike Potter	0	Chevy					BRI; DNQ							NZH; 39	CLT				MLW; 43							BRI; DNQ	CAL	RCH; DNQ										N/A	N/A
2004	Blake Mallory	0	Chevy						TEX; DNQ																														N/A	N/A
2004	Greg Sacks	0	Chevy							NSH; DNQ							DOV; 40																						N/A	N/A
2004	Gus Wasson	0	Chevy								TAL; DNQ	CAL	GTY	RCH																									N/A	N/A
2004	David Keith	0	Chevy															NSH; DNQ	KEN				NHA; DNQ																N/A	N/A
2004	Brad Teague	0	Chevy																		DAY; DNQ	CHI		PPR; 35															N/A	N/A
2004	Kertus Davis	0	Chevy																						IRP; 29	MCH				DOV; 27		CLT; DNQ	MEM; DNQ	ATL	PHO; DNQ	DAR; 34	HOM; DNQ		N/A	N/A
2004	Morgan Shepherd	0	Chevy																												KAN; DNQ								N/A	N/A
2005	Kertus Davis	0	Chevy	DAY; 34	CAL; 42		LVS; 42	ATL; 28	NSH; 32	BRI; 26	TEX; 40	PHO; 25	TAL; 10	DAR; 33	RCH; DNQ	CLT; 37	DOV; 27	NSH; 36	KEN; 26	MLW; 39	DAY; 21	CHI; DNQ	NHA; 38	PPR; 41	GTY; 40	IRP; 30		MCH; 42	BRI; 33	CAL; 35	RCH; DNQ	DOV; 25	KAN; DNQ	CLT; DNQ	MEM; 28		PHO; 31	HOM; 41	N/A	N/A
2005	Rafael Martinez	0	Chevy			MXC; 43																																	N/A	N/A
2005	Joe Fox	0	Chevy																								GLN; DNQ												N/A	N/A
2005	Eric McClure	0	Chevy																																	TEX; DNQ			N/A	N/A
2006	Kertus Davis	0	Chevy	DAY; DNQ	CAL; 42		LVS; DNQ	ATL; 35	BRI; 40	TEX; DNQ	NSH; 43	PHO; 41	TAL; 32	RCH; DNQ						MLW; 36	DAY; 31	CHI; 34	NHA; 31	MAR; 42	GTY; 39			MCH; 40	BRI; 38	CAL; 35	RCH; 42	DOV; 41	KAN; 36	CLT; DNQ		TEX; 37	PHO; 40	HOM; DNQ	N/A	N/A
2006	Randy LaJoie	0	Chevy			MXC; 41																																	N/A	N/A
2006	Morgan Shepherd	0	Chevy												DAR; DNQ	CLT; 41	DOV; 43	NSH; 40	KEN; 42							IRP; 41													N/A	N/A
2006	P. J. Jones	0	Chevy																								GLN; 43												N/A	N/A
2006	Chris Wimmer	0	Chevy																																MEM; DNQ				N/A	N/A
2007	Eric McClure	0	Chevy	DAY; 35	CAL; 40		LVS; 26	ATL; 37	BRI; 24	NSH; 26	TEX; 29	PHO; 30	TAL; 18	RCH; DNQ	DAR; 40	CLT; DNQ	DOV; 28	NSH; 35	KEN; 32	MLW; 31	NHA; 37	DAY; 36	CHI; 41	GTY; 37	IRP; 29			MCH; DNQ	BRI; 42	CAL; 37	RCH; 42	DOV; 26	KAN; 42	CLT; DNQ	MEM; 28	TEX; 40	PHO; DNQ	HOM; DNQ	N/A	N/A
2007	J. R. Fitzpatrick	0	Chevy			MXC; 33																				CGV; 43													N/A	N/A
2007	Kevin Lepage	0	Chevy																								GLN; 28												N/A	N/A
2008	Kertus Davis	0	Chevy	DAY; DNQ													DOV; 36																						N/A	N/A
2008	Dwayne Leik	0	Chevy		CAL; 38	LVS; 41	ATL; 43						TAL; 40																										N/A	N/A
2008	Mike Potter	0	Chevy					BRI; 43			PHO; 41																												N/A	N/A
2008	Danny Efland	0	Chevy						NSH; 37					RCH; 41	DAR; 35	CLT; 43		NSH; 39	KEN; 42																		PHO; DNQ		N/A	N/A
2008	Donnie Neuenberger	0	Chevy							TEX; DNQ																													N/A	N/A
2008	Joe Fox	0	Chevy									MXC; DNQ																											N/A	N/A
2008	J. C. Stout	0	Chevy																	MLW; 40	NHA; 39																		N/A	N/A
2008	Brad Teague	0	Chevy																			DAY; 43																	N/A	N/A
2008	Larry Gunselman	0	Chevy																				CHI; 43	GTY; 42	IRP; 42		GLN; DNQ	MCH; DNQ	BRI; 38	CAL; 36	RCH; DNQ	DOV; 36	KAN; DNQ	CLT; DNQ	MEM; DNQ	TEX			N/A	N/A
2008	Wheeler Boys	0	Chevy																							CGV; 32													N/A	N/A
2008	David Green	0	Chevy																																			HOM; 29	N/A	N/A
2009	Danny O'Quinn Jr.	0	Chevy	DAY; 23																																			N/A	N/A
2009	J. C. Stout	0	Chevy		CAL; 38			TEX; 40										MLW; 37											ATL; DNQ	RCH; 40	DOV; DNQ								N/A	N/A
2009	Robert Richardson Jr.	0	Chevy			LVS; 34																																	N/A	N/A
2009	Steve Grissom	0	Chevy				BRI; 43																																N/A	N/A
2009	Mark Green	0	Chevy						NSH; DNQ	PHO; 38		RCH; 40	DAR; 39	CLT; 41	DOV; 39	NSH; 43	KEN; 19																						N/A	N/A
2009	Mike Wallace	0	Chevy								TAL; 39								NHA; DNQ	DAY; DNQ	CHI; 38	GTY; 22	IRP; DNQ		GLN; 39														N/A	N/A
2009	Kertus Davis	0	Chevy																					IOW; 37		MCH; DNQ	BRI; DNQ												N/A	N/A
2009	Andy Lally	0	Chevy																									CGV; 37											N/A	N/A
2009	Jeremy Clements	0	Chevy																													KAN; 32	CAL; 12	CLT; 22	MEM; 29	TEX; 33	PHO; 29	HOM; DNQ	N/A	N/A
2010	Jeremy Clements	0	Chevy	DAY; DNQ	CAL	LVS	BRI	NSH	PHO	TEX																													N/A	N/A
2010	Chrissy Wallace	0	Chevy								TAL; 24	RCH	DAR	DOV	CLT	NSH	KEN	ROA	NHA	DAY	CHI	GTY	IRP	IOW	GLN	MCH													N/A	N/A
2010	Brad Teague	0	Chevy																								BRI; 38	CGV	ATL	RCH	DOV	KAN	CAL	CLT	GTY	TEX	PHO	HOM	N/A	N/A
2011	James Hylton	0	Chevy	DAY	PHO	LVS	BRI	CAL	TEX	TAL	NSH	RCH	DAR; 43																										74th	7
2011	Brad Teague	0	Chevy											DOV; 39																									74th	7
2011	Tim Schendel	0	Chevy												IOW; 42	CLT	CHI	MCH	ROA	DAY	KEN	NHA	NSH	IRP	IOW	GLN	CGV	BRI	ATL	RCH	CHI	DOV	KAN	CLT	TEX	PHO	HOM		74th	7
2015	Harrison Rhodes	0	Chevy	DAY; DNQ	ATL; 34	LVS; 26	PHO; 23	CAL; 25	TEX; 27	BRI; 29	RCH; 22	TAL; 36	IOW; 37	CLT; 35	DOV; 26	MCH; 22		DAY; 9	KEN; 35	NHA; 39	IND; 25	IOW; 35			BRI; 34		DAR; 33	RCH; 23		KEN; 34	DOV; 27			TEX; 34	PHO; 22	HOM; 24			31st	479
2015	Bobby Gerhart	0	Chevy														CHI; 36																						31st	479
2015	Michael Self	0	Chevy																				GLN; 37	MOH; 27					CHI; 25				KAN; 32						31st	479
2015	Lawson Aschenbach	0	Chevy																							ROA; 18													31st	479
2015	Josh Reaume	0	Chevy																													CLT; 38							31st	479
2016	Eric McClure	0	Chevy	DAY; 30																																			23rd	555
2016	Garrett Smithley	0	Chevy		ATL; 24	LVS; 24	PHO; 31	CAL; 23	TEX; 23	BRI; 29	RCH; 20	TAL; 12	DOV; 24	CLT; 15	POC; 27	MCH; 17	IOW; 22	DAY; 13	KEN; 24	NHA; 23	IND; 23	IOW; 22	GLN; 39	MOH; 24	BRI; 23	ROA; 40	DAR; 22	RCH; 31	CHI; 19	KEN; 17	DOV; 26	CLT; 25	KAN; 18	TEX; 25	PHO; 34	HOM; 29			23rd	555
2017	Garrett Smithley	0	Chevy	DAY; 8	ATL; 27	LVS; 29	PHO; 24	CAL; 26	TEX; 30	BRI; 34	RCH; 29	TAL; 21	CLT; 24	DOV; 27	POC; 35	MCH; 29	IOW; 10	DAY; 28	KEN; 26	NHA; 23	IND; 21	IOW; 35	GLN; 24	MOH; 30	BRI; 34	ROA; 27	DAR; 26	RCH; 32		KEN; 25	DOV; 29	CLT; 23	KAN; 28	TEX; 24	PHO; 25	HOM; 24			29th	355
2017	Vinnie Miller	0	Chevy																										CHI; 29										29th	355
2018	Garrett Smithley	0	Chevy	DAY; 5			PHO; 28	CAL; 23	TEX; 27	BRI; 17	RCH; 27	TAL; 10	DOV; 32	CLT; 14	POC; 26	MCH; 26	IOW; 25	CHI; 19	DAY; 28	KEN; 19	NHA; 32	IOW; 25	GLN; 23	MOH; 28	BRI; 16	ROA; 15		IND; 20	LVS; 18	RCH; 24	CLT; 25	DOV; 23	KAN; 13	TEX; 20	PHO; 26	HOM; 27			23rd	465
2018	Matt Mills	0	Chevy		ATL; 36	LVS; 27																																	23rd	465
2018	Vinnie Miller	0	Chevy																								DAR; 37												23rd	465
2019	Garrett Smithley	0	Chevy	DAY; 24	ATL; 17	LVS; 18	PHO; 22	CAL; 19	TEX; 31	BRI; 22	RCH; 19	TAL; 12	DOV; 23	CLT; 17	POC; 29	MCH; 27	IOW; 29	CHI; 25	DAY; 14	KEN; 19	NHA; 24	IOW; 22	GLN; 24	MOH; 20	BRI; 28	ROA; 33	DAR; 29	IND; 14	LVS; 23	RCH; 27		DOV; 26	KAN; 33	TEX; 17	PHO; 27	HOM; 32			22nd	462
2019	Lawson Aschenbach	0	Chevy																												CLT; 14								22nd	462
2020	B. J. McLeod	0	Chevy	DAY; 13	LVS; 33	CAL; 24	PHO; 20																																21st	501
2020	Jeffrey Earnhardt	0	Chevy					DAR; 23	CLT; 25	BRI; 15	ATL; 21	HOM; 19	HOM; 16	TAL; 14	POC; 16		KEN; 29	KEN; 18	TEX; 12	KAN; 17			DOV; 20	DOV; 29	DAY; 33	DAR; 21	RCH; 24	RCH; 14	BRI; 17	LVS; 33	TAL; 32	CLT; 11	KAN; 20	TEX; 18	MAR; 28	PHO; 32			21st	501
2020	Mike Wallace	0	Chevy													IND; 24					ROA; 24	DAY; 25																	21st	501
2021	Jeffrey Earnhardt	0	Chevy	DAY; 37	DAY; 30	HOM; 22	LVS; 19	PHO; 19	ATL; 19	MAR; 36	TAL; 22	DAR; 31	DOV; 18	COA; DNQ	CLT; 22	MOH; 34	TEX; 36	NSH; DNQ	POC; 22	ROA; DNQ	ATL; 22	NHA; 26	GLN; 25		MCH; 23	DAY; 20	DAR; 26	RCH; 30	BRI; 25	LVS; 29	TAL; 29	CLT; 20	TEX; 23	KAN; 28	MAR; 22	PHO; 36			32nd	338
2021	Spencer Pumpelly	0	Chevy																					IND; 24															32nd	338

=== Car No. 00 history ===
Mike Potter (2007)

The team would shut down at the end of the season with the team focusing instead on its purchase of the No. 01 car. Davis would enter a third car No. 00 for Mike Potter at the Milwaukee Mile in 2007 to fill out short Busch Series field.

==== Car No. 00 results ====
Year	Driver	No.	Make	1	2	3	4	5	6	7	8	9	10	11	12	13	14	15	16	17	18	19	20	21	22	23	24	25	26	27	28	29	30	31	32	33	34	35	Owners	Pts
2007	Mike Potter	00	Chevy	DAY	CAL	MXC	LVS	ATL	BRI	NSH	TEX	PHO	TAL	RCH	DAR	CLT	DOV	NSH	KEN	MLW; 42	NHA	DAY	CHI	GTY	IRP; DNQ	CGV	GLN	MCH	BRI	CAL	RCH	DOV	KAN	CLT	MEM	TEX	PHO	HOM	N/A	N/A

=== Car No. 01 history ===
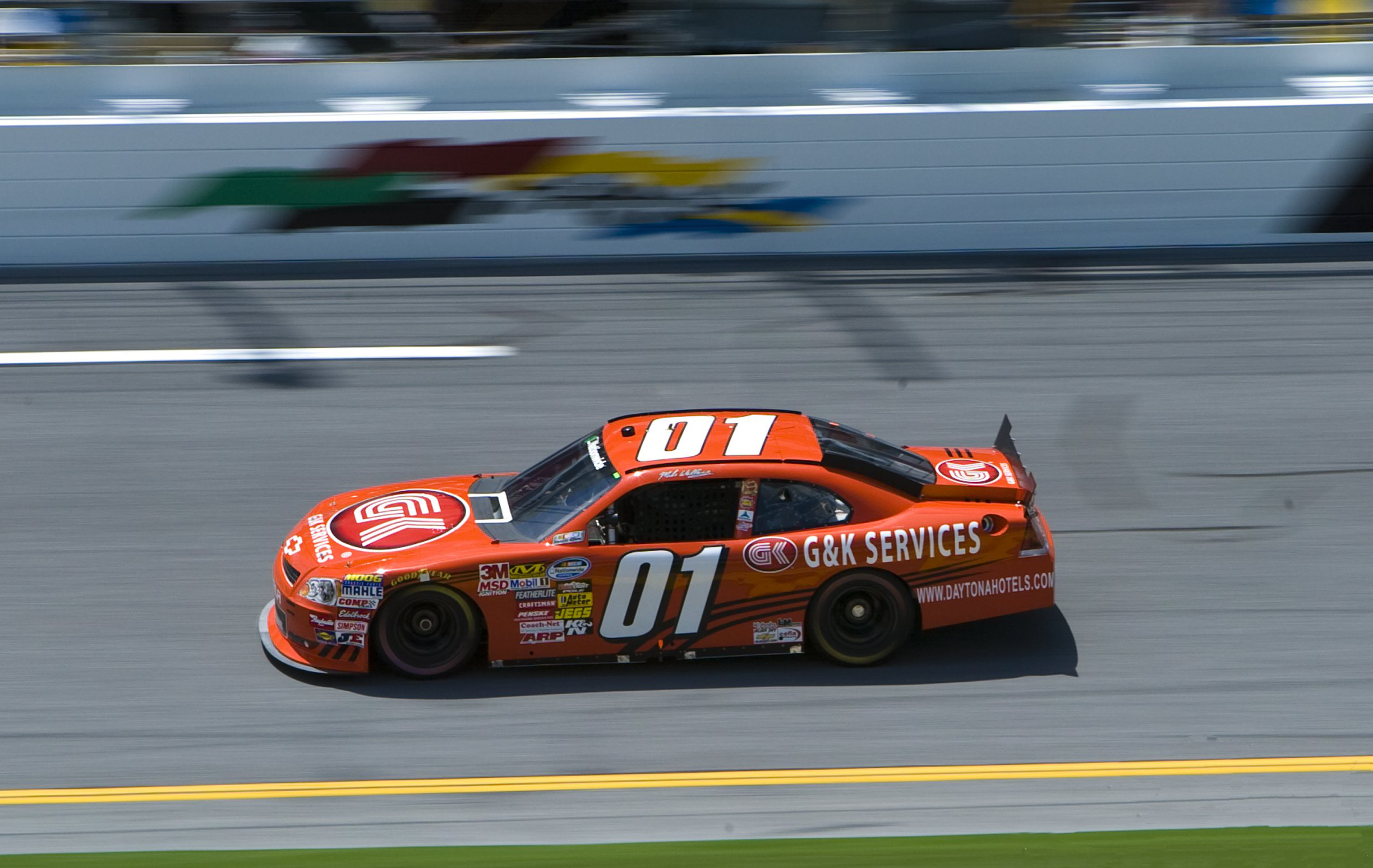
Mike Wallace at Daytona.

=== Duesenberg & Leik Motorsports (2006) ===
The No. 01 debuted in 2006 as Duesenberg & Leik Motorsports, with Jay Sauter driving the Western Union car. In the team's first season, the No. 01 team started 33 out of 35 races, with the best finish of seventh at Lucas Oil Indianapolis Raceway Park. Dwayne Leik also made one start, at the Winn-Dixie 250 in the No. 26. He started 38th and finished 32nd.

=== Multiple drivers (2007–2008) ===
For the 2007 season, Duesenberg & Leik merged with Davis' operation, with the owner's points for the 2006 season for the 01 were transferred to the 0 car. Morgan Shepherd drove the 01 on a limited basis. Kevin Lepage, Shelby Howard and Danny Efland also drove in 2007 after Shepherd left to drive for his team. Joe Fox at Montreal and Watkins Glen. Kertus Davis returned after being released from KHI and drove at Michigan, California, Kansas, and Charlotte.

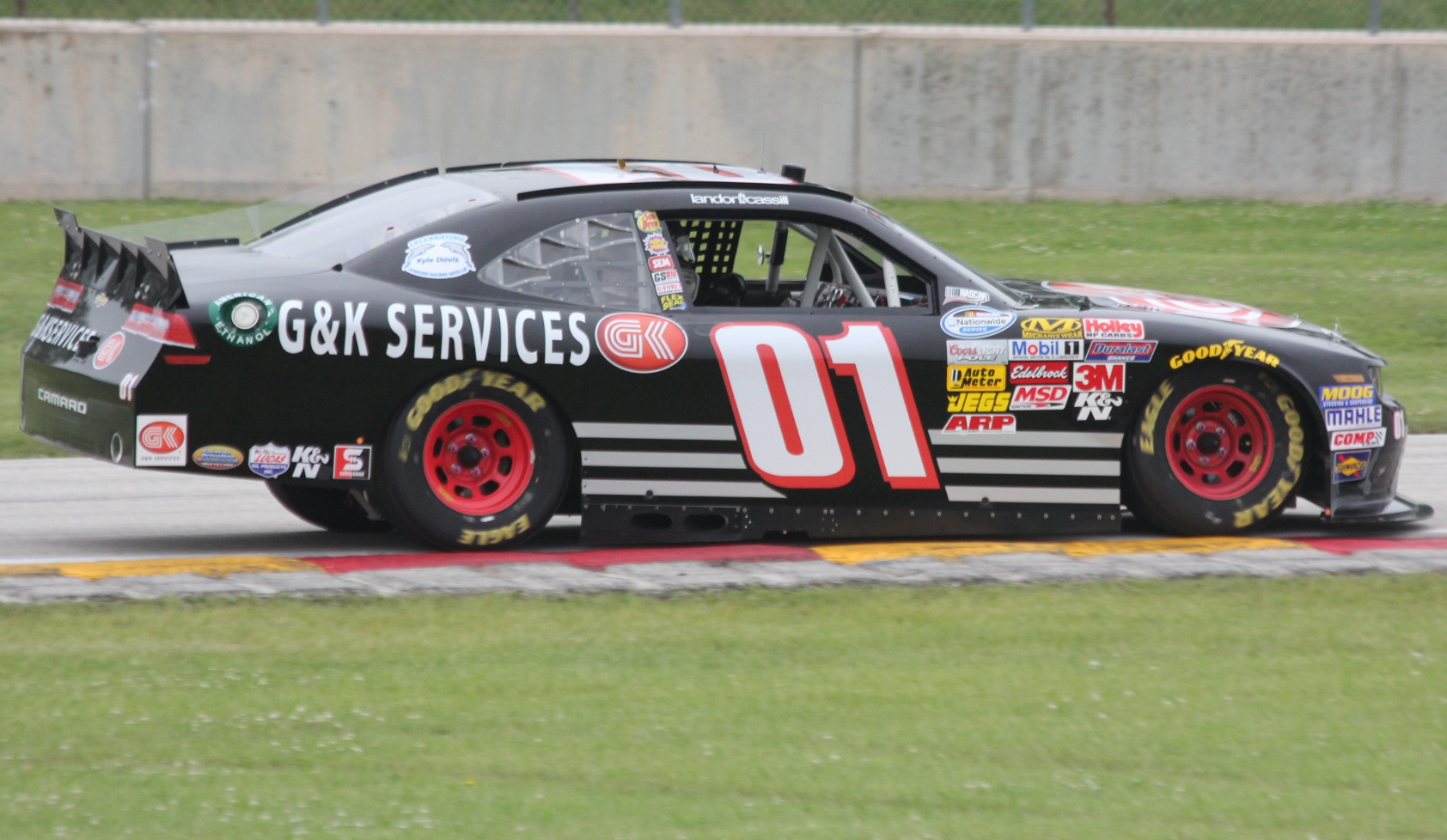
Landon Cassill at Road America in 2014.

Dwayne Leik qualified the No. 01 at Daytona to start 2008, but was replaced by Davis after the No. 0 time was disallowed. Davis continued to run in the No. 01 full-time since moving to the No. 01 at Daytona. J. C. Stout raced the No. 01 car at Dover, shortly before Davis announced he was leaving the team for Jay Robinson Racing. The car was 29th in owner points when Davis left. A variety of drivers drove the car including Trevor Boys at Montreal and his son Wheeler Boys at Watkins Glen. Danny Efland became the regular driver for the rest of the season.

=== Danny O'Quinn Jr. (2009) ===
In 2009 Mike Wallace drove the 01 at Daytona before Danny O'Quinn Jr. became the team's full-time driver. Cash4Gold.com, the American Basketball Association, and Sun Drop served as the team's regular sponsors. O'Quinn left the team late in the season and was replaced by his teammate Wallace.

=== Mike Wallace (2009–2013) ===
Wallace ran the final 10 races of the season in 2009, finishing 35th in points. Wallace ran the No. 01 full-time in 2010, getting the team up to eighth in points after Nashville, but they soon fell back and finished 18th in points.

Wallace returned to the 01 for 2011, gaining sponsorship from G&K Services. The team was battling for the win at Talladega, but the 01 flipped on its roof on the last lap, but Wallace drove the battered car to a 17th-place finish. Midway through 2011, the team gained a 10-race sponsorship from the movie Cowboys & Aliens. Wallace was released after the 2013 season.

=== Landon Cassill (2014–2015) ===
For 2014, Landon Cassill moved to the No. 01 car for 2014, becoming the team's primary driver in addition to running the full NASCAR Cup Series campaign with Hillman-Circle Sport LLC. With the switch, Cassill also retained the sponsorship of G&K Services. Cassill gained notoriety over the course of the season for getting the most out of his equipment with fewer resources to work with, consistently running in the top 15 each week.

=== Ryan Preece (2016) ===
On January 25, 2016, JD Motorsports announced that Whelen Modified Tour regular Ryan Preece will pilot the 01 full-time for 2016. Preece started the season on a low note, crashing early at Daytona, finishing last. Preece would get his first top ten place finish at Darlington, tenth. Preece didn't make the Chase and finished 17th in points. JD Motorsports announced that Preece would return in 2017, however, Preece left the team to return to Whelen Modified Tour.

=== Harrison Rhodes (2017) ===
On February 7, 2017, it was announced that Harrison Rhodes would return to the team, to drive the No. 01 car full-time, replacing Preece. Although Sheldon Creed drove the No. 01 at Road America and Mid-Ohio, with United Rentals as a sponsor for these races.

=== Vinnie Miller (2018) ===
On November 28, 2017, it was announced that Vinnie Miller would replace Rhodes in the No. 01 car full-time for the 2018 season. Miller left the team for B. J. McLeod Motorsports near the end of the season, with Lawson Aschenbach, Landon Cassill, and B. J. McLeod finishing the season.

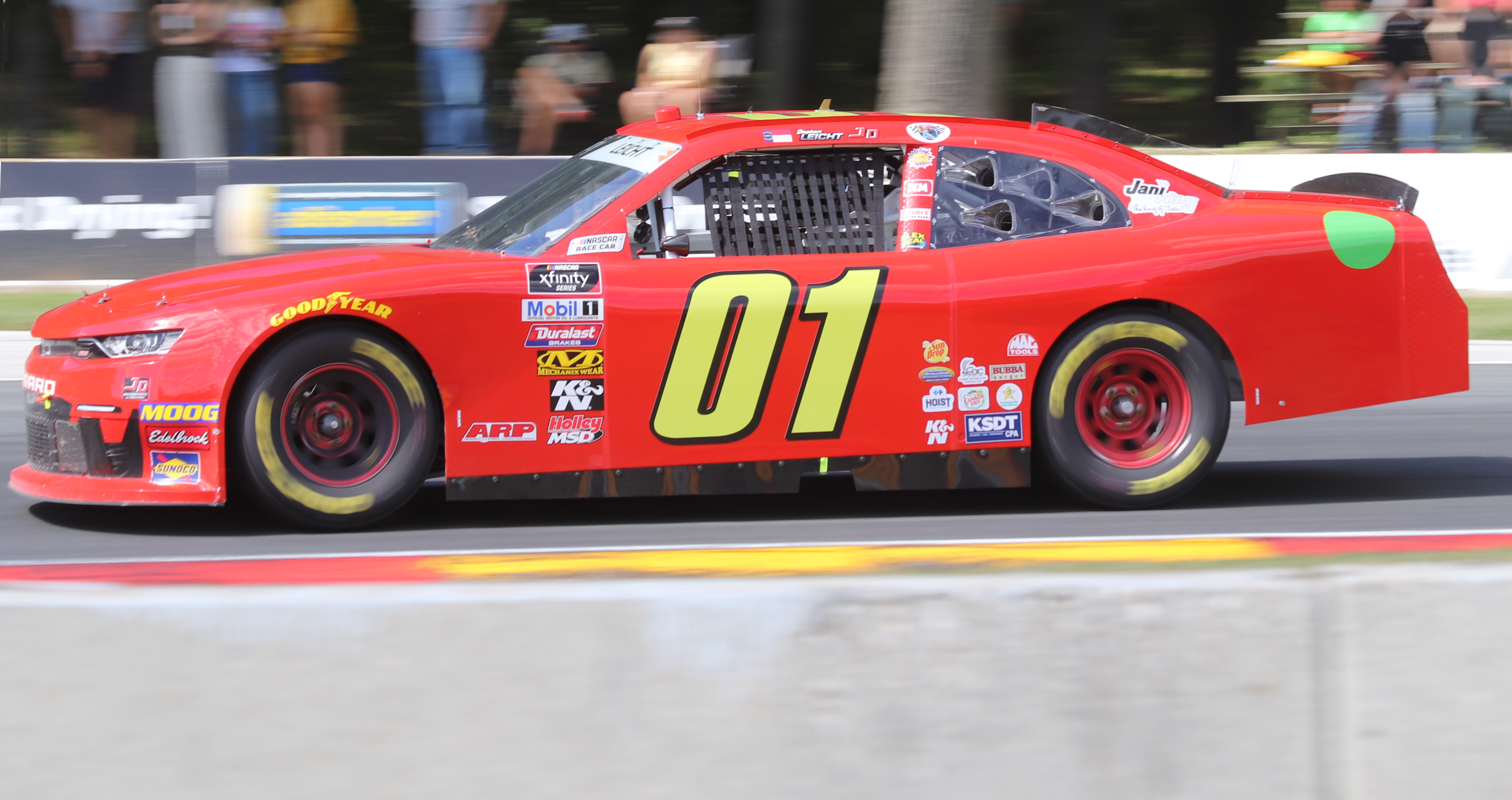
Stephen Leicht in 2019 at Road America

=== Stephen Leicht (2019) ===
Stephen Leicht has so far run the full 2019 season in the No. 01 car.

==== Car No. 01 results ====
Year	Driver	No.	Make	1	2	3	4	5	6	7	8	9	10	11	12	13	14	15	16	17	18	19	20	21	22	23	24	25	26	27	28	29	30	31	32	33	34	35	Owners	Pts
2006	Jay Sauter	01	Chevy	DAY; DNQ	CAL; 41	MXC; 24	LVS; 34	ATL; 29	BRI; 23	TEX; 40	NSH; 18	PHO; DNQ	TAL; 15	RCH; 17	DAR; 40	CLT; 39	DOV; 20	NSH; 13	KEN; 29	MLW; 11	DAY; 36	CHI; 27	NHA; 19	MAR; 10	GTY; 11	IRP; 7	GLN; 26	MCH; 26	BRI; 43	CAL; 10	RCH; 17	DOV; 31	KAN; 29	CLT; 40	MEM; 26	TEX; 39	PHO; 17	HOM; 30	N/A	N/A
2007	Morgan Shepherd	01	Chevy	DAY	CAL; 41	MXC	LVS	ATL; Wth	BRI; Wth	NSH; 42	TEX	PHO; 40	TAL; 42	RCH	DAR; 43	CLT																							N/A	N/A
2007	Kevin Lepage	01	Chevy														DOV; 40	NSH				DAY; 33	CHI																N/A	N/A
2007	Shelby Howard	01	Chevy																KEN; 27						IRP; 36														N/A	N/A
2007	Danny Efland	01	Chevy																	MLW; DNQ	NHA; 40			GTY; 43								DOV; 36							N/A	N/A
2007	Joe Fox	01	Chevy																							CGV; 41	GLN; 38												N/A	N/A
2007	Kertus Davis	01	Chevy																									MCH; 43	BRI	CAL; 33	RCH; DNQ		KAN; 43	CLT; 42	MEM; DNQ	TEX; 41	PHO; 41	HOM; DNQ	N/A	N/A
2008	Kertus Davis	01	Chevy	DAY; 32	CAL; 31	LVS; 33	ATL; 42	BRI; 23	NSH; 30	TEX; 32	PHO; 25	MXC; 43	TAL; 12	RCH; 31	DAR; 29	CLT; 25		NSH; 32																					N/A	N/A
2008	J. C. Stout	01	Chevy														DOV; 38																						N/A	N/A
2008	Dwayne Leik	01	Chevy	DAY; QL^{†}															KEN; 40																				N/A	N/A
2008	Mike Potter	01	Chevy																	MLW; 32	NHA; 29																		N/A	N/A
2008	James Hylton	01	Chevy																			DAY; 36																	N/A	N/A
2008	Danny Efland	01	Chevy																				CHI; 33	GTY; 38	IRP; 31			MCH; 28	BRI; 30	CAL; 27	RCH; 37	DOV; 26	KAN; 26	CLT; 23		TEX; 33		HOM; 25	N/A	N/A
2008	Trevor Boys	01	Chevy																							CGV; 34													N/A	N/A
2008	Wheeler Boys	01	Chevy																								GLN; 35								MEM; 33				N/A	N/A
2008	Larry Gunselman	01	Chevy																																		PHO; 36		N/A	N/A
2009	Mike Wallace	01	Chevy	DAY; 19																								CGV; 19	ATL; 19	RCH; 24	DOV; 22	KAN; 17	CAL; 15	CLT; 30	MEM; 15	TEX; 28	PHO; 22	HOM; 15	N/A	N/A
2009	Danny O'Quinn Jr.	01	Chevy		CAL; 33	LVS; 18	BRI; 37	TEX; 29	NSH; 32	PHO; 21	TAL; 37	RCH; 20	DAR; 27	CLT; 24	DOV; 21	NSH; 18	KEN; 18	MLW; 27	NHA; 26	DAY; 30	CHI; 29	GTY; 18	IRP; 34	IOW; 24	GLN; 25	MCH; 31	BRI; 32												N/A	N/A
2010	Mike Wallace	01	Chevy	DAY; 28	CAL; 12	LVS; 11	BRI; 17	NSH; 17	PHO; 23	TEX; 32	TAL; 42	RCH; 40	DAR; 13	DOV; 34	CLT; 35	NSH; 17	KEN; 21	ROA; 18	NHA; 28	DAY; 34	CHI; 22	GTY; 22	IRP; 22	IOW; 28	GLN; 18	MCH; 20	BRI; 31	CGV; 17	ATL; 36	RCH; 29	DOV; 19	KAN; 12	CAL; 21	CLT; 25	GTY; 16	TEX; 23	PHO; 29	HOM; 30	N/A	N/A
2011	Mike Wallace	01	Chevy	DAY; 37	PHO; 26	LVS; 21	BRI; 32	CAL; 24	TEX; 22	TAL; 18	NSH; 18	RCH; 33	DAR; 15	DOV; 10	IOW; 19	CLT; 25	CHI; 16	MCH; 22	ROA; 5	DAY; 15	KEN; 16	NHA; 27	NSH; 19	IRP; 17	IOW; 31	GLN; 20	CGV; 17	BRI; 26	ATL; 16	RCH; 15	CHI; 20	DOV; 29	KAN; 24	CLT; 22	TEX; 32	PHO; 16	HOM; 20		21st	777
2012	Mike Wallace	01	Chevy	DAY; 28	PHO; 32	LVS; 17	BRI; 23	CAL; 18	TEX; 19	RCH; 24	TAL; 28	DAR; 30	IOW; 21	CLT; 15	DOV; 18	MCH; 20	ROA; 19	KEN; 31	DAY; 36	NHA; 15	CHI; 16	IND; 20	IOW; 25	GLN; 18	CGV; 7	BRI; 17	ATL; 17	RCH; 21	CHI; 19	KEN; 20	DOV; 21	CLT; 23	KAN; 21	TEX; 24	PHO; 19	HOM; 26			19th	749
2013	Mike Wallace	01	Chevy	DAY; 34	PHO; 32	LVS; 34	BRI; 23	CAL; 23	TEX; 21	RCH; 33	TAL; 7	DAR; 25	CLT; 24	DOV; 31	IOW; 20	MCH; 16	ROA; 13	KEN; 21	DAY; 37	NHA; 28	CHI; 24	IND; 22	IOW; 24	GLN; 40	MOH; 33	BRI; 27	ATL; 27	RCH; 24	CHI; 28	KEN; 22	DOV; 21	KAN; 31	CLT; 22	TEX; 25	PHO; 25	HOM; 28			23rd	609
2014	Landon Cassill	01	Chevy	DAY; 21	PHO; 19	LVS; 19	BRI; 12	CAL; 35	TEX; 33	DAR; 12	RCH; 13	TAL; 8	IOW; 10	CLT; 30	DOV; 14	MCH; 14	ROA; 8	KEN; 13	DAY; 30	NHA; 15	CHI; 21	IND; 16	IOW; 13	GLN; 33	MOH; 14	BRI; 22	ATL; 15	RCH; 14	CHI; 16	KEN; 29	DOV; 16	KAN; 34	CLT; 17	TEX; 19	PHO; 32	HOM; 35			17th	800
2015	Landon Cassill	01	Chevy	DAY; 31	ATL; 17	LVS; 20	PHO; 37	CAL; 21	TEX; 25	BRI; 28	RCH; 10	TAL; 11	IOW; 20	CLT; 17	DOV; 22	MCH; 35		DAY; 31	KEN; 16	NHA; 23	IND; 31		GLN; 36	MOH; 18	BRI; 15		DAR; 8	RCH; 18	CHI; 32		DOV; 15	CLT; 18	KAN; 18	TEX; 22	PHO; 29	HOM; 16			23rd	700
2015	Ross Chastain	01	Chevy														CHI; 18									ROA; 27													23rd	700
2015	Michael Self	01	Chevy																			IOW; 32								KEN; 36									23rd	700
2016	Ryan Preece	01	Chevy	DAY; 40	ATL; 22	LVS; 18	PHO; 21	CAL; 25	TEX; 28	BRI; 19	RCH; 23	TAL; 15	DOV; 39	CLT; 22	POC; 17	MCH; 19	IOW; 32	DAY; 34	KEN; 15	NHA; 19	IND; 25	IOW; 34	GLN; 27	MOH; 17	BRI; 15	ROA; 11	DAR; 10	RCH; 26	CHI; 17	KEN; 30	DOV; 18	CLT; 23	KAN; 32	TEX; 22	PHO; 22	HOM; 21			22nd	597
2017	Harrison Rhodes	01	Chevy	DAY; 10	ATL; 24	LVS; 27	PHO; 23	CAL; 31	TEX; 35	BRI; 23	RCH; 24	TAL; 22	CLT; 34	DOV; 37	POC; 37	MCH; 22	IOW; 36	DAY; 36	KEN; 28	NHA; 18	IND; 22	IOW; 15	GLN; 23		BRI; 31		DAR; 24	RCH; 30	CHI; 25	KEN; 24	DOV; 37	CLT; 22	KAN; 24	TEX; 25	PHO; 27				31st	336
2017	Sheldon Creed	01	Chevy																					MOH; 34		ROA; 38													31st	336
2017	Joe Nemechek	01	Chevy																																	HOM; 27			31st	336
2018	Vinnie Miller	01	Chevy	DAY; 20	ATL; 31	LVS; 24	PHO; 33	CAL; 27	TEX; 39	BRI; 33	RCH; 31	TAL; 17	DOV; 22	CLT; 28	POC; 31	MCH; 25	IOW; 31	CHI; 27	DAY; 19	KEN; 29	NHA; 27	IOW; 29	GLN; 35	MOH; 36	BRI; 32	ROA; 27		IND; 17	LVS; 26	RCH; 37									31st	318
2018	Landon Cassill	01	Chevy																								DAR; 14					DOV; 26							31st	318
2018	Lawson Aschenbach	01	Chevy																												CLT; 21								31st	318
2018	B. J. McLeod	01	Chevy																														KAN; 23	TEX; 36	PHO; 23	HOM; 32			31st	318
2019	Stephen Leicht	01	Chevy	DAY; 38	ATL; 25	LVS; 27	PHO; 31	CAL; 22	TEX; 22	BRI; 32	RCH; 18	TAL; 24	DOV; 26	CLT; 15	POC; 23	MCH; 20		CHI; 21	DAY; 5	KEN; 24			GLN; 20	MOH; 32	BRI; 19	ROA; 34		IND; 23	LVS; 21		CLT; 19	DOV; 23	KAN; 27	TEX; 19	PHO; 21	HOM; 24			21st	464
2019	Ryan Repko	01	Chevy														IOW; 22					IOW; 25								RCH; 19									21st	464
2019	B. J. McLeod	01	Chevy																		NHA; 21																		21st	464
2019	Landon Cassill	01	Chevy																								DAR; 18												21st	464

=== Car No. 04 history ===
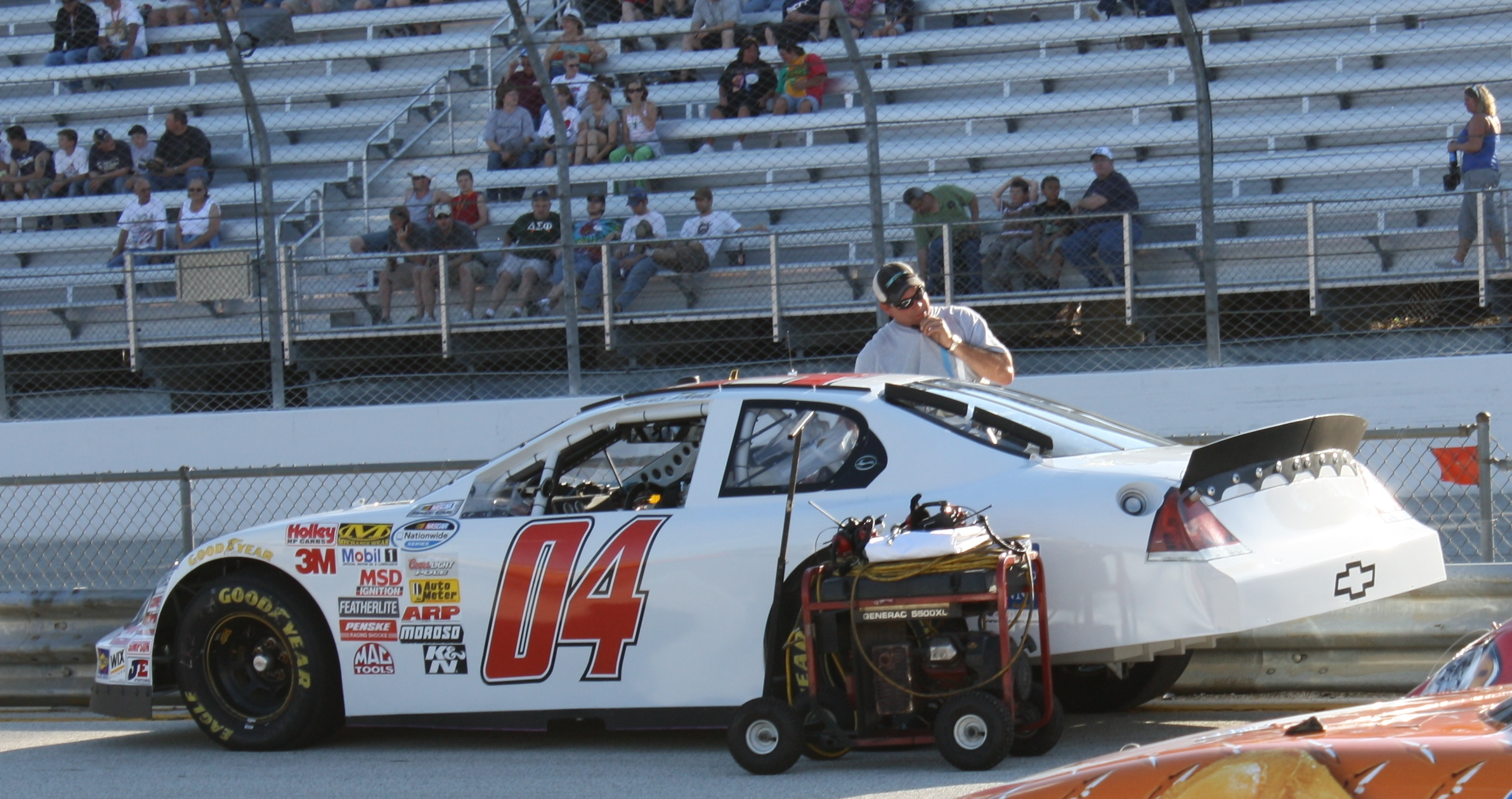
Kertus Davis in 2009.

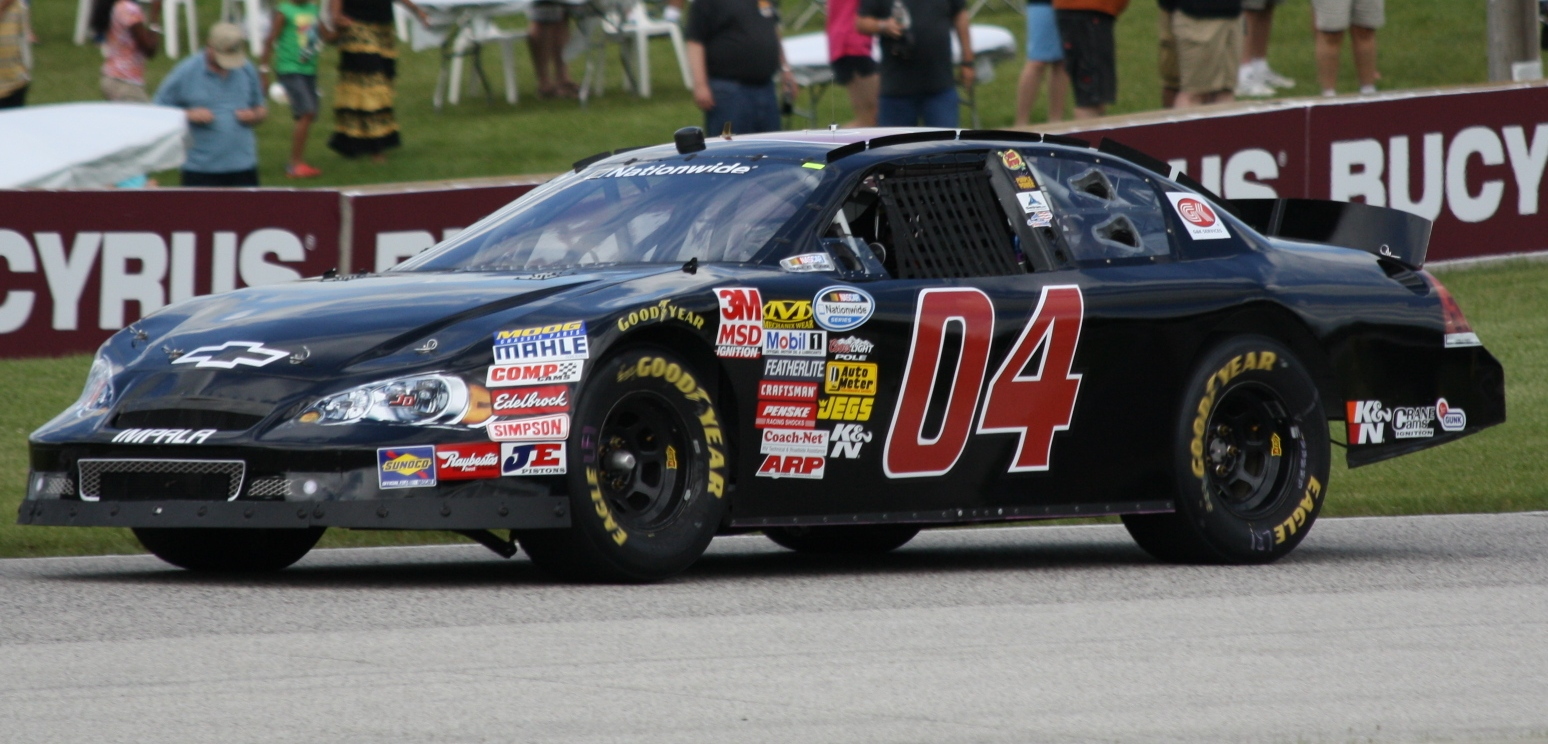
Kevin Lepage in 2010.

In 2009, the team fielded the No. 04 with Mark Green as the driver at Talladega, but lose an engine. Kertus Davis took over the car after leaving Jay Robinson Racing starting with Milwaukee and will drive it for at least 3 races.

In 2010, the team returned for Brad Teague, Jeremy Clements, and Kevin Lepage.

==== Car No. 04 results ====
Year	Driver	No.	Make	1	2	3	4	5	6	7	8	9	10	11	12	13	14	15	16	17	18	19	20	21	22	23	24	25	26	27	28	29	30	31	32	33	34	35	Owners	Pts
2009	Mark Green	04	Chevy	DAY	CAL	LVS	BRI	TEX	NSH	PHO	TAL; 43	RCH	DAR	CLT	DOV	NSH	KEN																						N/A	N/A
2009	Kertus Davis	04	Chevy															MLW; 42	NHA; DNQ	DAY; 33	CHI; 42	GTY; DNQ	IRP; 42	IOW	GLN	MCH	BRI	CGV	ATL	RCH	DOV	KAN	CAL	CLT	MEM	TEX	PHO	HOM	N/A	N/A
2010	Brad Teague	04	Chevy	DAY; 42			BRI; DNQ																																N/A	N/A
2010	Jeremy Clements	04	Chevy		CAL; DNQ	LVS; DNQ		NSH; 22	PHO	TEX; 33	TAL; DNQ	RCH	DAR	DOV	CLT; 16	NSH; 19	KEN; 12			DAY; 37	CHI; DNQ	GTY; DNQ	IRP	IOW; 20	GLN	MCH; 25	BRI; 23	CGV	ATL; DNQ	RCH; 34	DOV; 33	KAN; 32	CAL	CLT; 34	GTY; 10	TEX; 19	PHO	HOM; 39	N/A	N/A
2010	Kevin Lepage	04	Chevy															ROA; 43	NHA																				N/A	N/A

=== Car No. 4 history ===
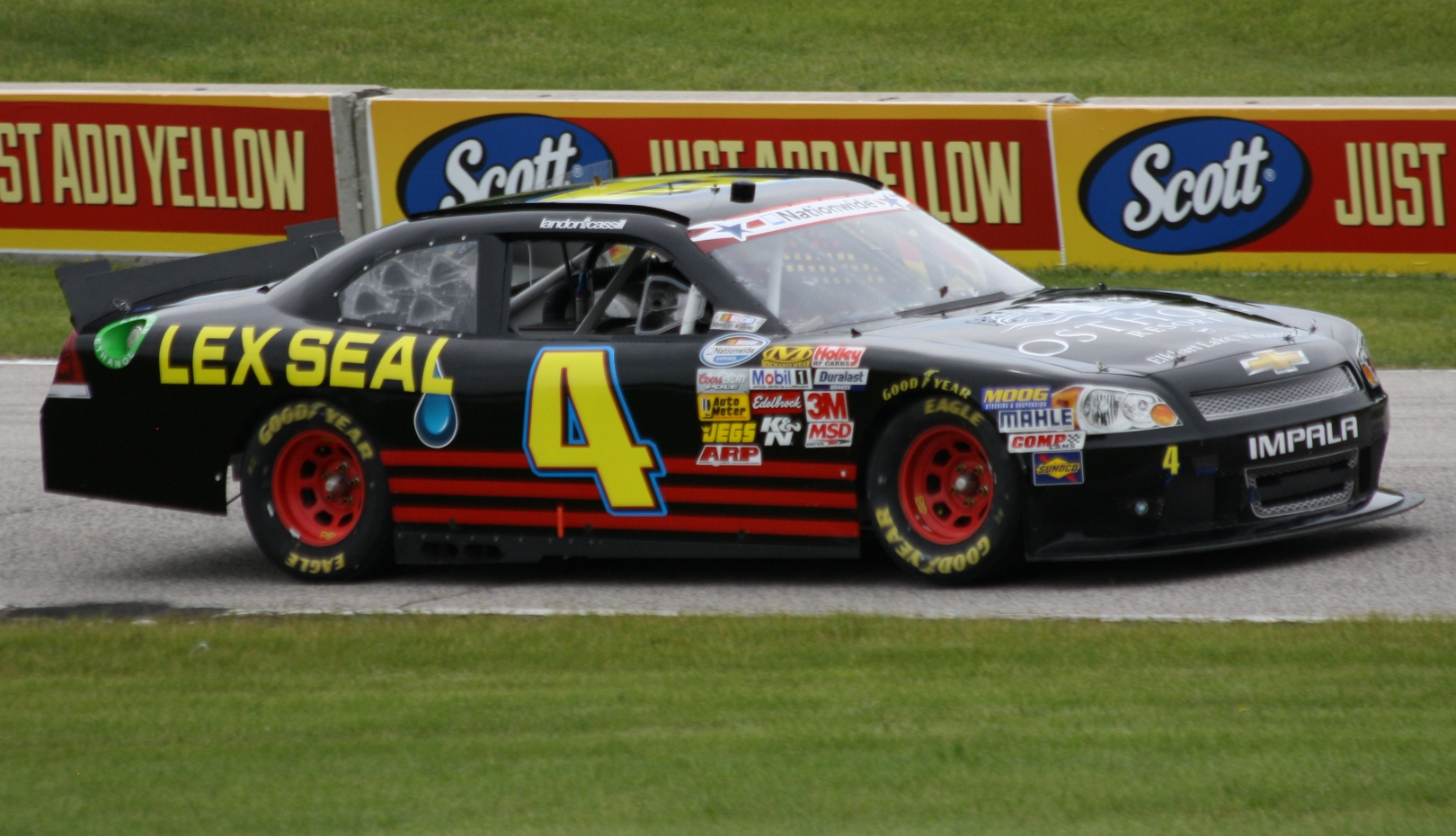
The No. 4 driven by Landon Cassill at Road America in 2013

Throughout the team's history, the No. 4 car was the most competitive and successful.

Multiple drivers (2012–2013)

In early February 2012, it was announced that JD Motorsports would field the No. 4, primarily for Danny Efland and Daryl Harr. Steve Wallace drove the car as a Ford at the spring Richmond race with his father's team, and Jeremy Clements drove the car at Indianapolis and Richmond when Ty Dillon was driving the No. 51 (under RCR)

For 2013, Danny Efland ran the car at Daytona, finishing 25th. Daryl Harr then ran the next four races with a best finish of 28th at Fontana. Landon Cassill joined the team in March for the remainder of the season. Cassill ran 23 races for the team, and managed to finish 24th in points despite missing 10 races. He would move over to the 01 car for 2014.

Jeffrey Earnhardt (2014)

Jeffrey Earnhardt joined the team in 2014 to pilot the No. 4 car, with sponsorship from Warrior 50, a non-profit organization honoring Vietnam War veterans. Perdue Foods came on to sponsor the car at Richmond in April. The Great RV Outdoors Store sponsored the car for the Zippo 200 at Watkins Glen International. In July, Earnhardt was injured in a motorcycle accident, breaking his collarbone. Matt DiBenedetto relieved him during the July Daytona race after 53 laps. After being relieved in two more races, Earnhardt was cleared to run the full race at Indianapolis.

Ross Chastain (2015–2019)

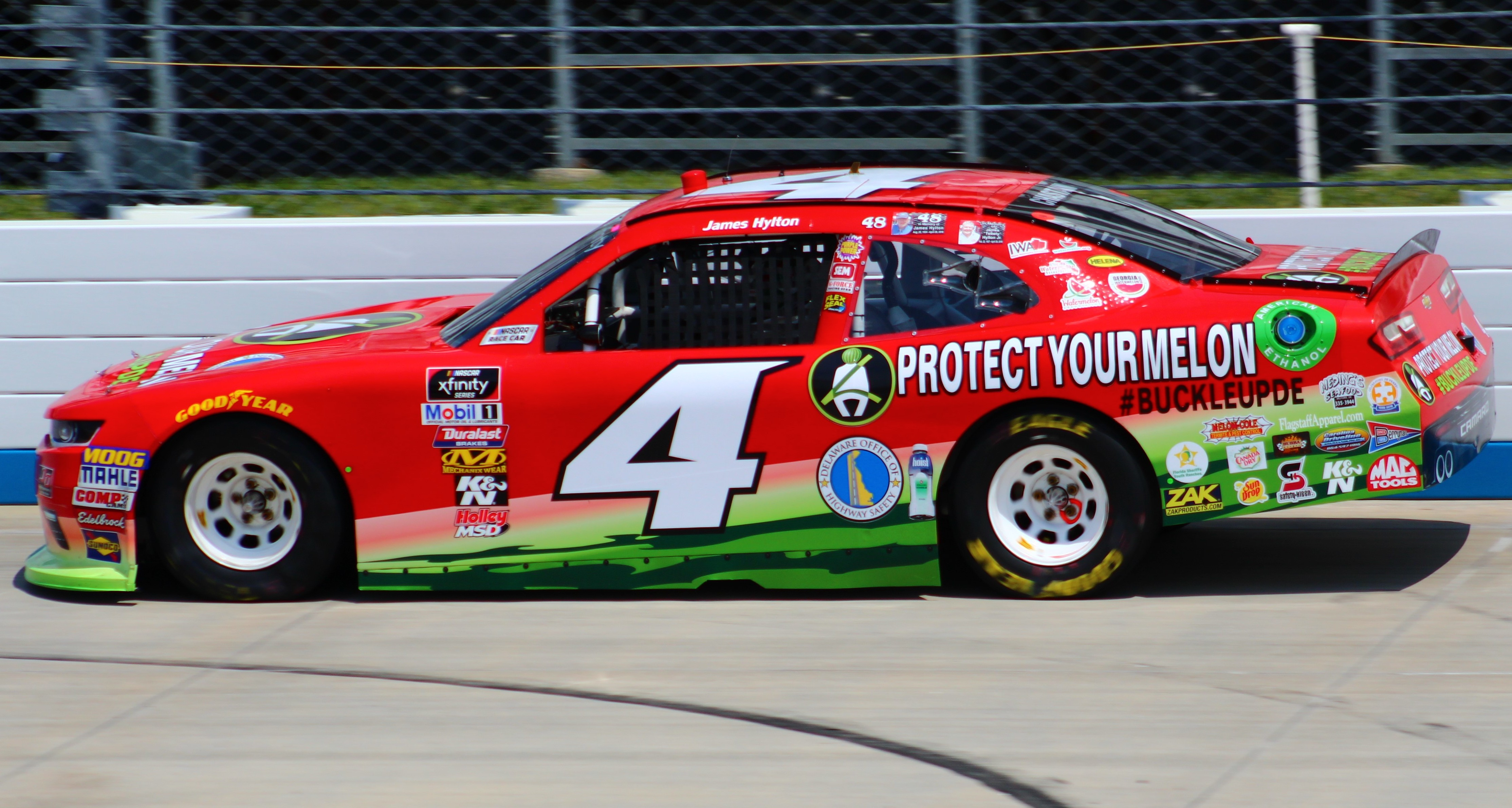
Chastain's No. 4 car at Dover in 2018

For 2015, Ross Chastain drove the No. 4 Chevrolet Camaro and replaced Jeffrey Earnhardt. Chastain scored a few top tens and finished 15th in points in his first year with the team. Chastain regressed in 2016, with no top tens and finishing 16th in points, though this was the best of all of the JD teams. In 2017, Chastain had his best season so far. He scored a top 5 at Iowa and 2 top tens and finished a career-high 13th in points, beating J. J. Yeley to be the highest non-playoff driver in points. Chastain will return in 2018. Chastain ran 30 races in the No. 4, moving to Chip Ganassi Racing and their No. 42 entry for 3 races. Garrett Smithley drove the remaining three races. In 2018, Chastain gave JD Motorsports their first playoff appearance ever as one of the top twelve drivers in the regular season, though he was eliminated in the first round.

Chastain was to run Chip Ganassi Racing's No. 42 full-time in 2019 but these plans were scrapped when the team had to shut down their Xfinity Series operation due to their sponsor DC Solar's legal troubles. Chastain moved back to the No. 4 initial as a full-time driver before deciding to focus on his Truck Series campaign with Niece Motorsports.

Jesse Little (2020)

On November 7, 2019, it was announced that Jesse Little would race in the No. 4 full-time for the team in the NASCAR Xfinity Series starting in 2020.

Landon Cassill (2021)

On January 22, 2021, it was announced that Landon Cassill would drive the No. 4 full-time for the team in the 2021 NASCAR Xfinity Series. Cassill left the team at the end of year to drive Kaulig Racing's No. 10, bringing cryptocurrency Voyager with him.

Bayley Currey (2022–2023)

Bayley Currey would drive the 4 in 2022.

Currey would return full-time for the number 4 team in 2023. However, he left the team following the race at Phoenix.

Multiple drivers (2023–2024)

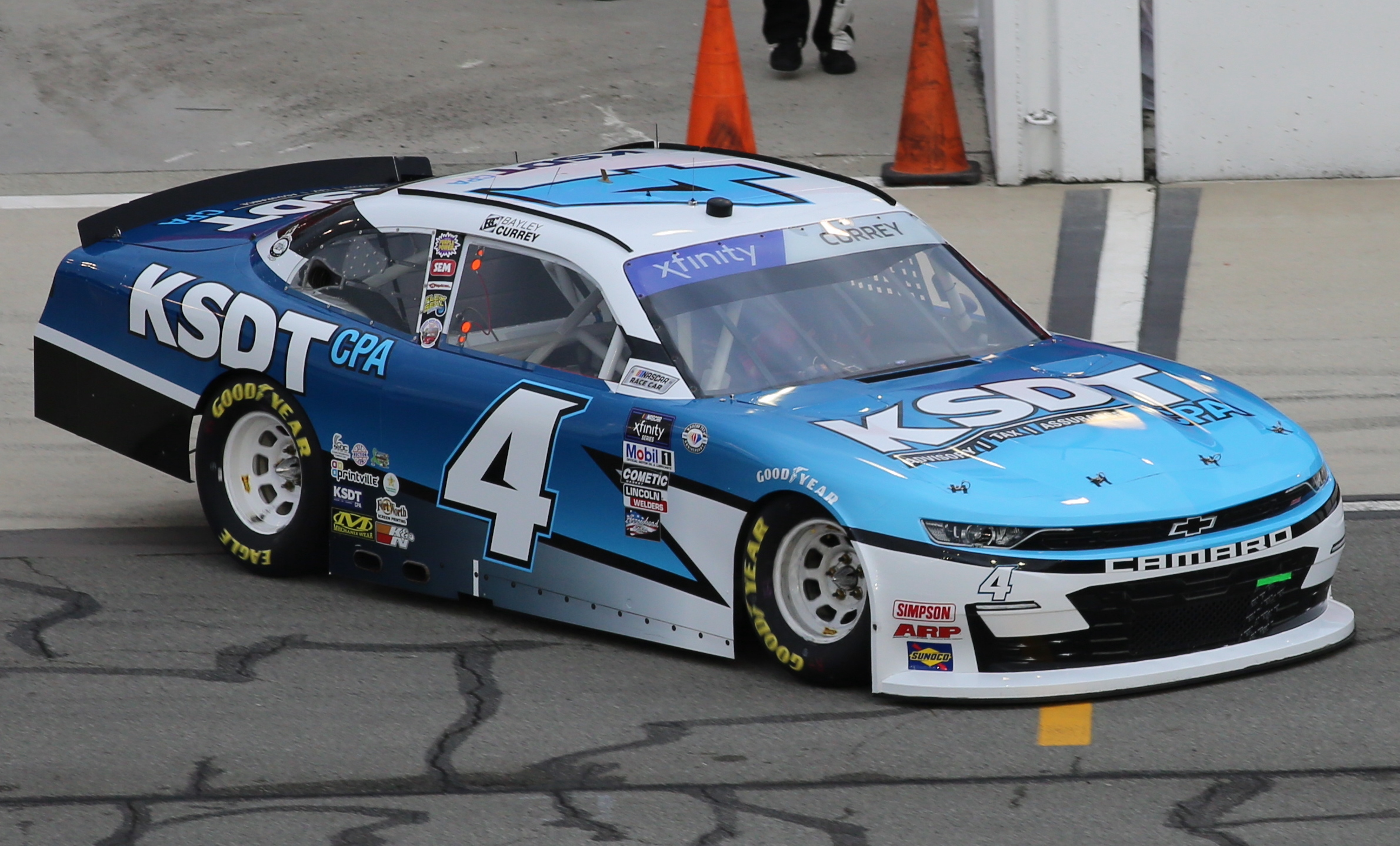
The No. 4 driven by Bayley Currey at Auto Club in 2023.

On March 14, 2023, it was announced that Garrett Smithley would fill in for the remainder of the 2023 season, but was replaced by Kyle Weatherman, Ty Dillon, J. J. Yeley, and Stefan Parsons for multiple events.

On December 6, 2023, it was announced that Dawson Cram would drive the No. 4 car in 2024. On July 16, 2024, it was announced that No. 4 owner points were sold to Alpha Prime Racing for the No. 45 car.

==== Car No. 4 results ====
Year	Driver	No.	Make	1	2	3	4	5	6	7	8	9	10	11	12	13	14	15	16	17	18	19	20	21	22	23	24	25	26	27	28	29	30	31	32	33	Owners	Pts
2012	Danny Efland	4	Chevy	DAY; 13					TEX; 31		TAL; 16	DAR; 20		CLT; 35		MCH; 27		KEN; 34	DAY; 13	NHA; 29	CHI; 32						ATL; 19		CHI; 27	KEN; 30		CLT; 31	KAN; 14	TEX; 28		HOM; 31	25th	603
2012	Daryl Harr	4	Chevy		PHO; 33	LVS; 26		CAL; 28					IOW; 28										IOW; 33	GLN; 30	CGV; 23										PHO; 28		25th	603
2012	Brad Teague	4	Chevy				BRI; 32								DOV; 25											BRI; 26					DOV; 28						25th	603
2012	Steve Wallace	4	Ford							RCH; 11																											25th	603
2012	Matt Bell	4	Chevy														ROA; 34																				25th	603
2012	Jeremy Clements	4	Chevy																			IND; 10						RCH; 24									25th	603
2013	Danny Efland	4	Chevy	DAY; 25			BRI; DNQ																														26th	601
2013	Daryl Harr	4	Chevy		PHO; 34	LVS; 31		CAL; 28							IOW; 24								IOW; 25												PHO; 33		26th	601
2013	Landon Cassill	4	Chevy						TEX; 36	RCH; 19	TAL; 17	DAR; 23	CLT; 21	DOV; 22		MCH; 26	ROA; 39	KEN; 36	DAY; 23	NHA; 30	CHI; 21	IND; 25		GLN; 17		BRI; 23	ATL; 19	RCH; 23	CHI; 22		DOV; 19	KAN; 22	CLT; 32	TEX; 24		HOM; 33	26th	601
2013	Kevin Lepage	4	Chevy																						MOH; 20					KEN; 19							26th	601
2014	Jeffrey Earnhardt	4	Chevy	DAY; 30	PHO; 27	LVS; 33	BRI; 32	CAL; 23	TEX; 19	DAR; 20	RCH; 24	TAL; 16	IOW; 23	CLT; 25	DOV; 30	MCH; 25	ROA; 23	KEN; 23	DAY; 33	NHA; 23	CHI; 24	IND; 35	IOW; 31	GLN; 21	MOH; 28	BRI; 12	ATL; 25	RCH; 32	CHI; 30	KEN; 16	DOV; 20	KAN; 29	CLT; 40	TEX; 34	PHO; 40	HOM; 21	26th	586
2015	Ross Chastain	4	Chevy	DAY; 9	ATL; 24	LVS; 18	PHO; 27	CAL; 17	TEX; 21	BRI; 27	RCH; 17	TAL; 25	IOW; 32	CLT; 31	DOV; 16	MCH; 21		DAY; 10	KEN; 20	NHA; 37	IND; 22	IOW; 10	GLN; 17	MOH; 19	BRI; 17		DAR; 10	RCH; 15	CHI; 16	KEN; 18	DOV; 37	CLT; 24	KAN; 14	TEX; 16	PHO; 19	HOM; 19	21st	794
2015	Harrison Rhodes	4	Chevy														CHI; 25																				21st	794
2015	Michael Self	4	Chevy																							ROA; 11											21st	794
2016	Ross Chastain	4	Chevy	DAY; 22	ATL; 28	LVS; 16	PHO; 24	CAL; 19	TEX; 21	BRI; 22	RCH; 18	TAL; 16	DOV; 20	CLT; 17	POC; 19	MCH; 16	IOW; 14	DAY; 11	KEN; 22	NHA; 31	IND; 21	IOW; 18	GLN; 14	MOH; 14	BRI; 32	ROA; 33	DAR; 29	RCH; 24	CHI; 39	KEN; 19	DOV; 12	CLT; 21	KAN; 13	TEX; 21	PHO; 20	HOM; 22	21st	670
2017	Ross Chastain	4	Chevy	DAY; 16	ATL; 25	LVS; 25	PHO; 22	CAL; 37	TEX; 23	BRI; 31	RCH; 38	TAL; 19	CLT; 15	DOV; 21	POC; 24	MCH; 19	IOW; 4	DAY; 6	KEN; 20	NHA; 19	IND; 16	IOW; 18	GLN; 19	MOH; 15	BRI; 15	ROA; 13	DAR; 14	RCH; 28	CHI; 22	KEN; 21	DOV; 12	CLT; 14	KAN; 17	TEX; 19	PHO; 19	HOM; 17	19th	595
2018	Ross Chastain	4	Chevy	DAY; 9	ATL; 16	LVS; 18	PHO; 19	CAL; 10	TEX; 28	BRI; 9	RCH; 18	TAL; 34	DOV; 16	CLT; 26	POC; 11	MCH; 14	IOW; 19	CHI; 13	DAY; 10	KEN; 17	NHA; 26	IOW; 4	GLN; 20	MOH; 16	BRI; 12	ROA; 7		IND; 12			CLT; 12	DOV; 13	KAN; 25	TEX; 11	PHO; 15	HOM; 16	16th	715
2018	Garrett Smithley	4	Chevy																								DAR; 20										16th	715
2018	Landon Cassill	4	Chevy																										LVS; 14								16th	715
2018	Quin Houff	4	Chevy																											RCH; 31							16th	715
2019	Scott Lagasse Jr.	4	Chevy	DAY; 21																																	17th	606
2019	Ross Chastain	4	Chevy		ATL; 14	LVS; 7	PHO; 17	CAL; 18	TEX; 16	BRI; 33	RCH; 11		DOV; 12	CLT; 11	POC; 14	MCH; 14							GLN; 33									DOV; 13					17th	606
2019	Landon Cassill	4	Chevy									TAL; 9						CHI; 19	DAY; 37						BRI; 10			IND; 16									17th	606
2019	Stephen Leicht	4	Chevy														IOW; 25				NHA; 23	IOW; 16								RCH; 29							17th	606
2019	B. J. McLeod	4	Chevy																	KEN; 20							DAR; 19		LVS; 22				KAN; 19	TEX; 16		HOM; 20	17th	606
2019	Lawson Aschenbach	4	Chevy																					MOH; 28													17th	606
2019	Ryan Vargas	4	Chevy																							ROA; 18									PHO; 26		17th	606
2019	Garrett Smithley	4	Chevy																												CLT; 33						17th	606
2020	Jesse Little	4	Chevy	DAY; 19	LVS; 14	CAL; 28	PHO; 21	DAR; 36	CLT; 15	BRI; 26	ATL; 20	HOM; 18	HOM; 15	TAL; 13	POC; 10	IND; 18	KEN; 14	KEN; 14	TEX; 14	KAN; 33	ROA; 28	DAY; 18	DOV; 23	DOV; 23	DAY; 10	DAR; 18	RCH; 25	RCH; 33	BRI; 25	LVS; 23	TAL; 25			TEX; 15	MAR; 22	PHO; 29	20th	537
2020	B. J. McLeod	4	Chevy																													CLT; 22	KAN; 17				20th	537
2021	Landon Cassill	4	Chevy	DAY; 23	DAY; 12	HOM; 19	LVS; 21	PHO; 22	ATL; 14	MAR; 37	TAL; 20	DAR; 12		COA; 22				NSH; 29	POC; 21	ROA; 27	ATL; 38	NHA; 25	GLN; 20	IND; 17	MCH; 26	DAY; 21	DAR; 16	RCH; 39	BRI; 39	LVS; 16	TAL; 37	CLT; 17	TEX; 36	KAN; 19	MAR; 12	PHO; DNQ	30th	351
2021	Ryan Vargas	4	Chevy										DOV; 26		CLT; 16	MOH; 18	TEX; 24																				30th	351
2022	Bayley Currey	4	Chevy	DAY; 20	CAL; 34	LVS; 18	PHO; 20	ATL; 29	COA; 38	RCH; 31	MAR; 17	TAL; 17	DOV; 36	DAR; 23	TEX; 24	CLT; 15	PIR; 30	NSH; 31	ROA; 16	ATL; 29	NHA; 10	POC; 26	IND; 21	MCH; 30	GLN; 26	DAY; 30	DAR; 19	KAN; 35	BRI; 11	TEX; 12	TAL; 24	CLT; 26	LVS; 33	HOM; 13	MAR; 38	PHO; 19	27th	428
2023	Bayley Currey	4	Chevy	DAY; 38	CAL; 30	LVS; 28	PHO; 28																														34th	290
2023	Garrett Smithley	4	Chevy					ATL; 36	COA; DNQ	RCH; 30	MAR; DNQ	TAL; 16	DOV; 31	DAR; DNQ	CLT; 33	PIR; 24				ATL; 26		POC; 21		MCH; 30					KAN; 25		TEX; DNQ		LVS; DNQ				34th	290
2023	Ty Dillon	4	Chevy														SON; 23																				34th	290
2023	Kyle Weatherman	4	Chevy															NSH; 18	CSC; 14		NHA; 27		ROA; 20		IRC; 20	GLN; 13	DAY; 33	DAR; 31		BRI; 23		ROV; 26					34th	290
2023	J. J. Yeley	4	Chevy																															HOM; DNQ	MAR; 34		34th	290
2023	Stefan Parsons	4	Chevy																																	PHO; 33	34th	290
2024	Dawson Cram	4	Chevy	DAY; 31	ATL; 31	LVS; 34	PHO; 28		RCH; 25	MAR; 24	TEX; 37	TAL; 28	DOV; 29	DAR; 28	CLT; 22			IOW; 22		NSH; 37																		
2024	Patrick Gallagher	4	Chevy					COA; 25																														
2024	Garrett Smithley	4	Chevy													PIR; 22	SON; 27		NHA; 29																			
2024	Ty Dillon	4	Chevy																		CSC; DNQ																	
2024	Thomas Annunziata	4	Chevy																			POC; 28	IND	MCH	DAY	DAR	ATL	GLN	BRI	KAN	TAL	ROV	LVS	HOM	MAR	PHO		

=== Car No. 6 history ===
B. J. McLeod (2020)

For 2020, the 01 car was renumbered to No. 6, David Starr moved to No. 6 car. Unfortunately, He lost his ride with this team on May 18 due to sponsorship problems caused by the COVID-19 pandemic. Later it was announced that B. J. McLeod will be moved from the 0 car as Starr's replacement. Jade Buford would make his second NASCAR start at Road America in this car.

Ryan Vargas (2020–2022)

In September 2020, Ryan Vargas was tabbed to drive the 6 car for six races after he picked up a six-race sponsorship from the popular social networking service TikTok.

Vargas would return to the No. 6 for a full-time schedule in 2021 and finish 26th in the owners points after swapping them with Landon Cassill's No. 4 car.

On May 31, 2022, crew chief Kase Kallenbach was suspended indefinitely for violating Section 4.4.e, which deals with NASCAR Member Code of Conduct Penalty Options and Guidelines. He was replaced by Alex Bird at Charlotte.

On October 31, 2022, it was announced that Vargas would not return to JD Motorsports starting at the last race of 2022 at Phoenix Raceway

Brennan Poole (2023)

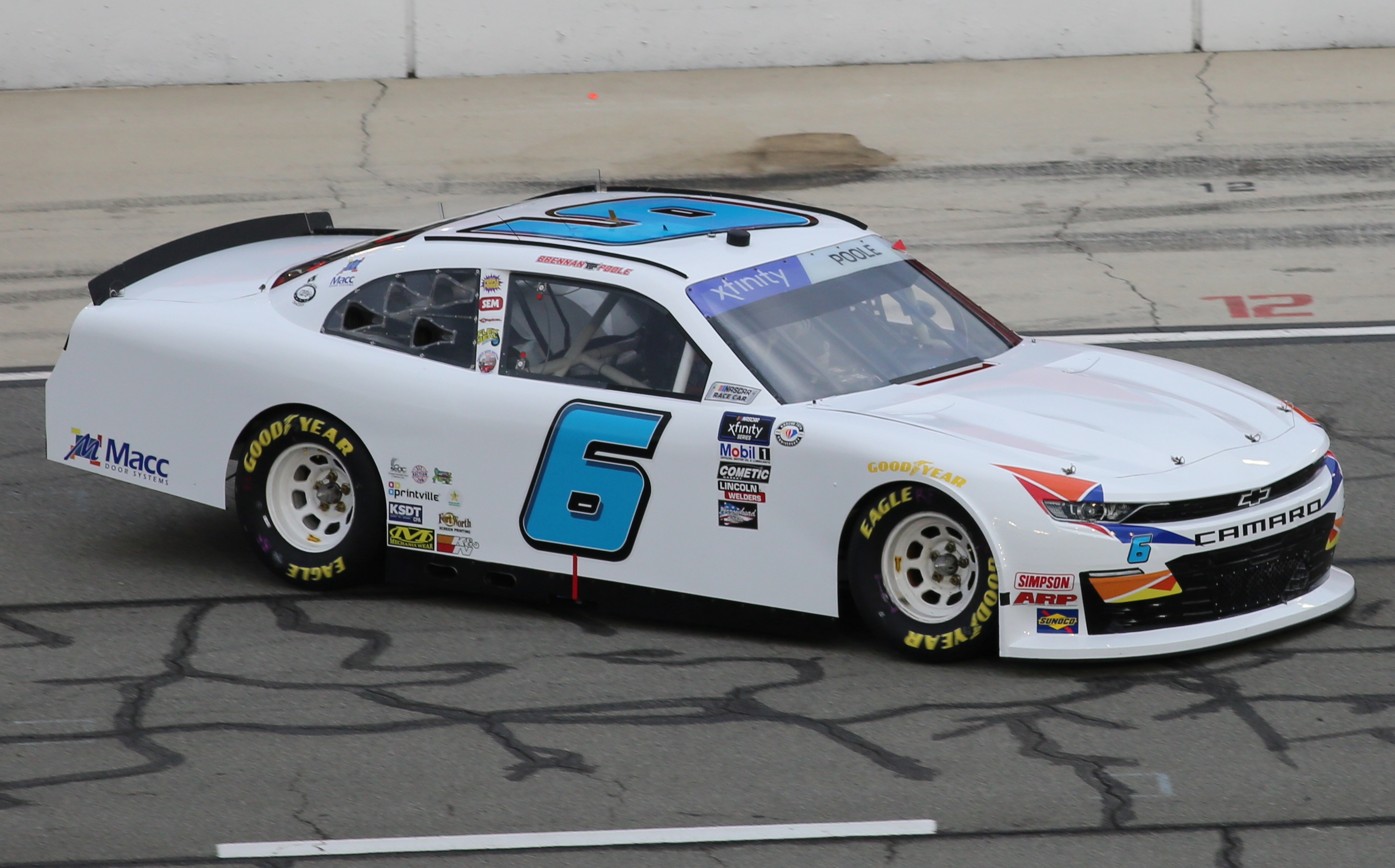
The No. 6 driven by Brennan Poole at Auto Club in 2023.

Brennan Poole would drive the 6 in 2023.

Garrett Smithley (2024)

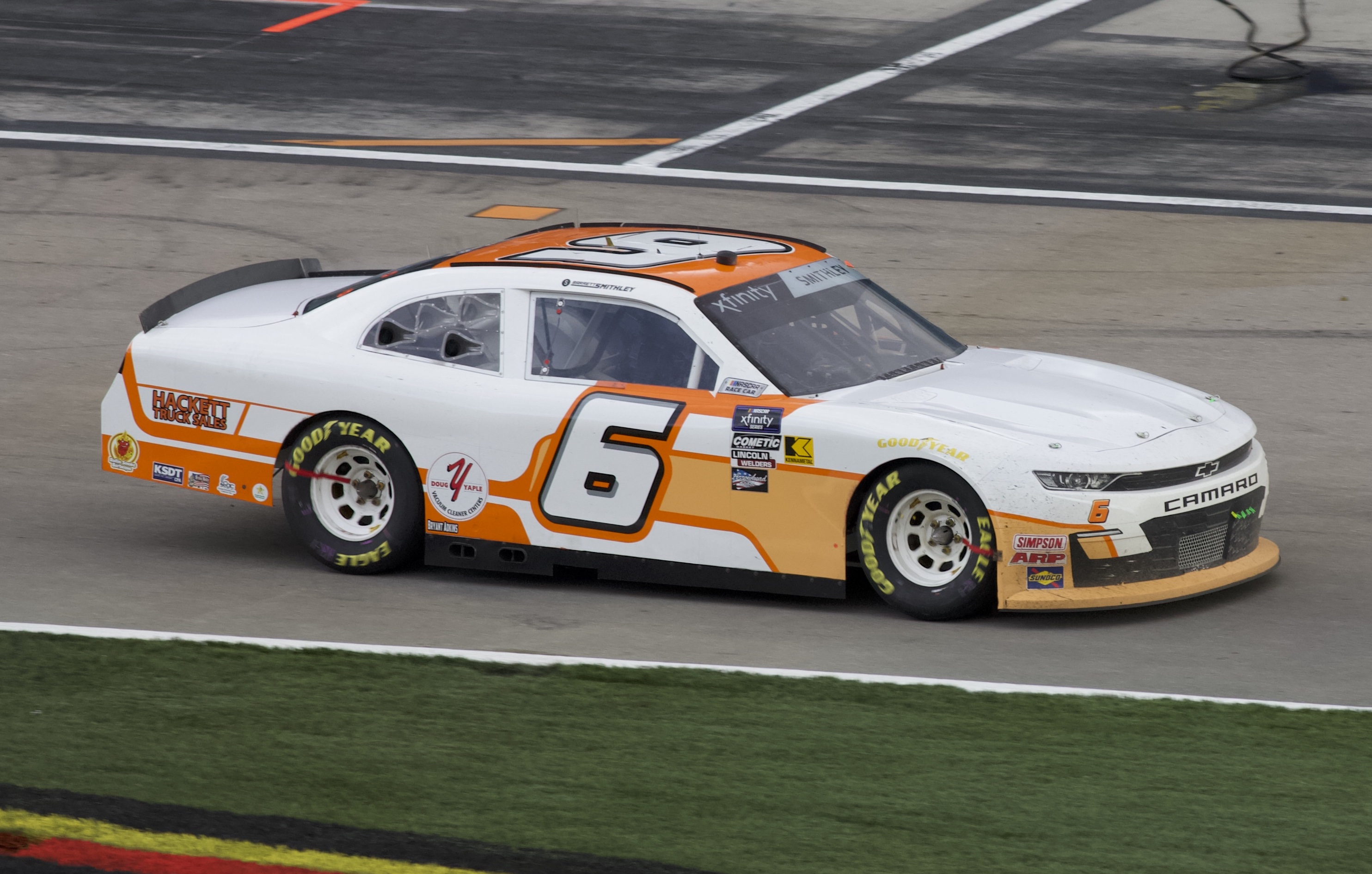
The No. 6 driven by Garrett Smithley at Las Vegas in 2024.

Garrett Smithley served as the primary driver in 2024. Ty Dillon ran at COTA and Morgen Baird initially planned to make his NASCAR Xfinity Series debut at Richmond Raceway. However, two days later, it was announced that Baird would postpone his debut in the series due to his fiancé going into induced labor with their soon to be born child; he would be replaced by Smithley. Prior to the fall Talladega race the cars owner points would be purchased by Joey Gase Motorsports for their No. 53 car.

==== Car No. 6 results ====
Year	Driver	No.	Make	1	2	3	4	5	6	7	8	9	10	11	12	13	14	15	16	17	18	19	20	21	22	23	24	25	26	27	28	29	30	31	32	33	Owners	Pts
2020	David Starr	6	Chevy	DAY; 18	LVS; 24	CAL; 21	PHO; 26																														25th	430
2020	B. J. McLeod	6	Chevy					DAR; 15	CLT; 17	BRI; 11	ATL; 25	HOM; 26	HOM; 34	TAL; 23	POC; 14	IND; 29	KEN; 18	KEN; 20	TEX; 20	KAN; 31		DAY; 20	DOV; 34	DOV; 25	DAY; 32		RCH; 29	RCH; 24	BRI; 34	LVS; 26							25th	430
2020	Jade Buford	6	Chevy																		ROA; 19																25th	430
2020	Ryan Vargas	6	Chevy																							DAR; 25					TAL; 30	CLT; 17	KAN; 34	TEX; 8	MAR; 34	PHO; 33	25th	430
2021	Ryan Vargas	6	Chevy	DAY; 18	DAY; 37	HOM; 24	LVS; 23	PHO; 30	ATL; 31	MAR; 40	TAL; 30	DAR; 27						NSH; 18	POC; 39		ATL; 14	NHA; 29			MCH; 21	DAY; 27	DAR; 25	RCH; 35	BRI; 37	LVS; 19	TAL; 33	CLT; 36	TEX; 22	KAN; 22	MAR; 32	PHO; 28	26th	436
2021	Landon Cassill	6	Chevy										DOV; 25		CLT; 13	MOH; 20	TEX; 15																				26th	436
2021	Spencer Pumpelly	6	Chevy											COA; 19						ROA; 36																	26th	436
2021	Michael Munley	6	Chevy																				GLN; 35														26th	436
2021	Ryan Eversley	6	Chevy																					IND; DNQ													26th	436
2022	Ryan Vargas	6	Chevy	DAY; 18	CAL; 35	LVS; 32	PHO; 29	ATL; 12	COA; 30	RCH; 36	MAR; 25	TAL; 20	DOV; 26	DAR; 21	TEX; 38	CLT; 26		NSH; 19		ATL; 21	NHA; 19	POC; 25		MCH; 29		DAY; 6	DAR; 27	KAN; 33			TAL; 30	CLT; 24	LVS; 28		MAR; 29		34th	356
2022	Gray Gaulding	6	Chevy														PIR; 36																				34th	356
2022	Ty Dillon	6	Chevy																ROA; 37				IND; 20														34th	356
2022	Spencer Pumpelly	6	Chevy																						GLN; DNQ												34th	356
2022	Bobby McCarty	6	Chevy																										BRI; 31								34th	356
2022	Brennan Poole	6	Chevy																											TEX; 31				HOM; 14		PHO; 29	34th	356
2023	Brennan Poole	6	Chevy	DAY; 33	CAL; 25	LVS; 33	PHO; 29	ATL; 13	COA; 33	RCH; 34	MAR; 29	TAL; 5	DOV; 24	DAR; 23	CLT; 30	PIR; 38	SON; DNQ	NSH; 20	CSC; 26	ATL; 28	NHA; 24	POC; 29	ROA; 15	MCH; 29	IRC; 25	GLN; 12		DAR; 20	KAN; 28	BRI; 22	TEX; 34	ROV; 17	LVS; 25	HOM; 19	MAR; 32	PHO; 29	29th	387
2023	Garrett Smithley	6	Chevy																								DAY; 16										29th	387
2024	Garrett Smithley	6	Chevy	DAY; 16	ATL; 34	LVS; 29	PHO; 26		RCH; 21	MAR; 29	TEX; 34	TAL; DNQ	DOV; 30	DAR; 29	CLT; 24			IOW; 26		NSH; 36		POC; Wth	IND	MCH	DAY	DAR	ATL	GLN	BRI	KAN	TAL	ROV	LVS	HOM	MAR	PHO		
2024	Ty Dillon	6	Chevy					COA; 37																														
2024	Patrick Gallagher	6	Chevy													PIR; 24																						
2024	Thomas Annunziata	6	Chevy														SON; 34				CSC; DNQ																	
2024	Armani Williams	6	Ford																NHA; 33																			

=== Car No. 10 history ===
Jason Schuler and Gus Wasson (2004)

In 2004, the team fielded the No. 10 for Jason Schuler with Operation Fire SAFE as a sponsor. After six races and the best finish of 27th, he was replaced by Gus Wasson with Race Girl sponsorship. He ran for most of the season in the ten car, replaced once by Tina Gordon. His best finish that season came at Nashville Superspeedway, where he finished 22nd.

==== Car No. 10 results ====
Year	Driver	No.	Make	1	2	3	4	5	6	7	8	9	10	11	12	13	14	15	16	17	18	19	20	21	22	23	24	25	26	27	28	29	30	31	32	33	34	Owners	Pts
2004	Jason Schuler	10	Chevy	DAY; 29	CAR; 27	LVS; 31	DAR; 32	BRI; 38	TEX; 41																													N/A	N/A
2004	Gus Wasson	10	Chevy							NSH; 33		CAL; 36	GTY; 25	RCH; 25	NZH; 26	CLT; 24	DOV; 33	NSH; 22	KEN; 35	MLW; 28	DAY; 37	CHI; 29	NHA; 24	PPR; 31	IRP; 37	MCH; 26	BRI; 40	CAL; 31	RCH; 36	DOV; 28	KAN; 28	CLT; DNQ	MEM; 26	ATL; 31	PHO; 31	DAR; 28	HOM; DNQ	N/A	N/A
2004	Tina Gordon	10	Chevy								TAL; 28																											N/A	N/A

=== Car No. 15 history ===
2017

In midway through the 2017 season, Johnny Davis added a fourth new car as a start-and-park entry to help fund the no. 0, no. 01 and/or no. 4 car. The no. 15 withdrew at Daytona in July and Kentucky Summer race. Reed Sorenson drove at New Hampshire (39th place - brakes), Indianapolis (38th place - vibration), Iowa (39th place - transmission), and Charlotte (37th place - electrical).

Multiple drivers (2018)

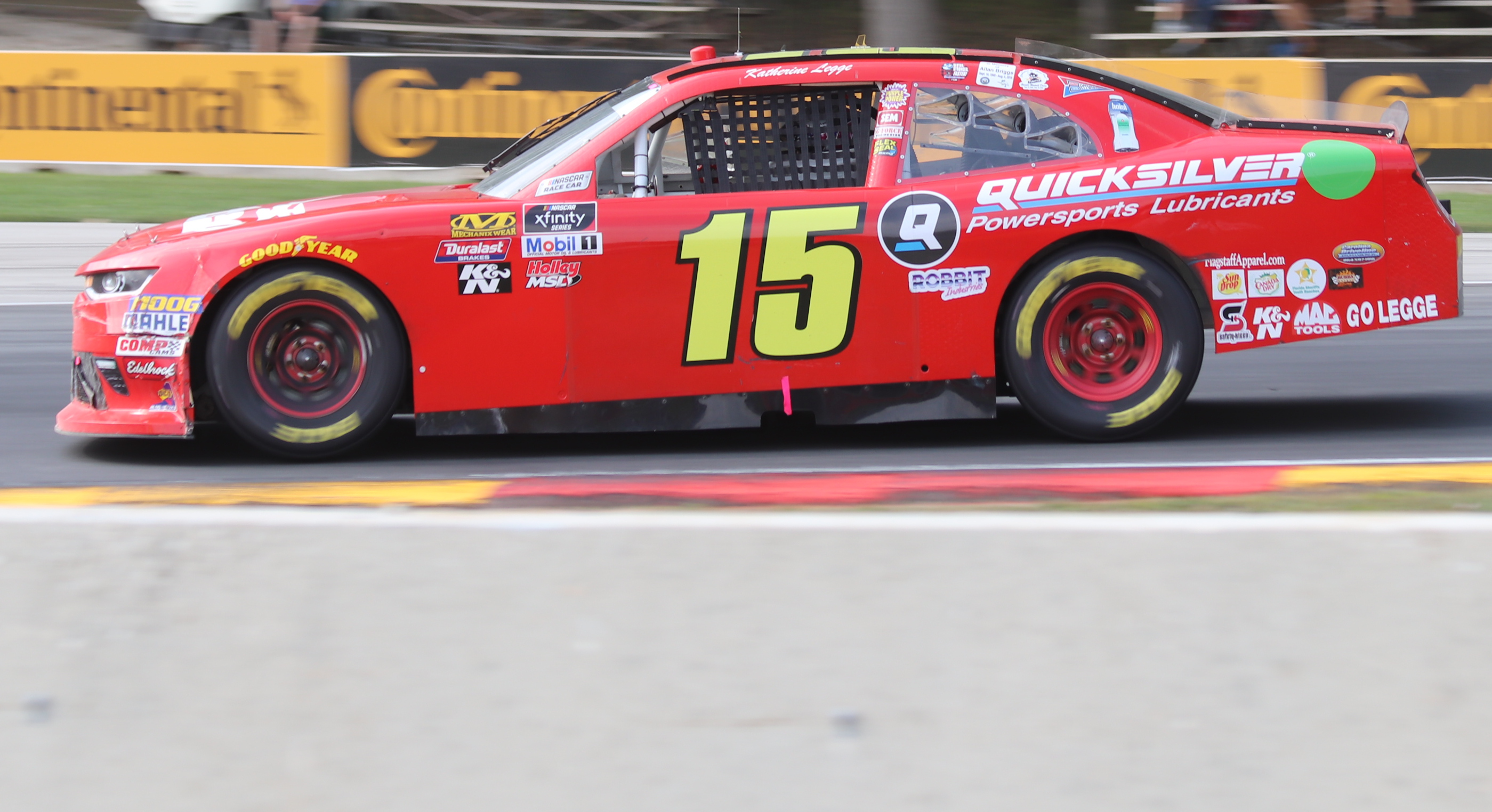
Katherine Legge races the #15 in 2018 at Road America

This team was announced to go full-time in 2018 with part-time drivers Joe Nemechek, Reed Sorenson, and others. However, in February it was announced Matt Mills would drive the car full-time starting at Atlanta. Nemechek would drive the car at Daytona. But after 5 attempts by Mills (including a DNQ in his fifth attempt at Texas) and has only one finish better than 36th (27th at Las Vegas) along with 2 DNF's, Mills was replaced at Bristol by Nemechek, who finished 19th. Other drivers to run the No. 15 in 2018 include B. J. McLeod, Brandon Hightower, Katherine Legge and Quin Houff.

B. J. McLeod (2019)

In 2019, B. J. McLeod has run 22 races for the No. 15 with some part-time drivers such as Tyler Matthews (7 races), Landon Cassill (1 race), Ryan Vargas (1 race), Stephen Leicht (1 race), and Stefan Parsons (1 race).

Colby Howard (2020–2021)

For 2020, It was announced that Colby Howard would drive this car for 20 races. While Robby Lyons joined in for the first three Xfinity races in 2020 and spring Talladega race. Later Ryan Vargas returned to this car in June 2020 on a multi-race deal. Jeffrey Earnhardt later drove this car on road-course tracks.

Howard was announced as the full-time driver for the car for the 2021 season on December 14, 2020. Howard left the team following Darlington after signing a deal to drive McAnally–Hilgemann Racing's No. 91 for the 2022 NASCAR Camping World Truck Series season. The 15 team was shut down.

==== Car No. 15 results ====
Year	Driver	No.	Make	1	2	3	4	5	6	7	8	9	10	11	12	13	14	15	16	17	18	19	20	21	22	23	24	25	26	27	28	29	30	31	32	33	Owners	Pts
2017	Reed Sorenson	15	Chevy	DAY	ATL	LVS	PHO	CAL	TEX	BRI	RCH	TAL	CLT	DOV	POC	MCH	IOW	DAY	KEN	NHA; 39	IND; 38	IOW; 39	GLN	MOH	BRI; DNQ	ROA	DAR; DNQ	RCH; 39			DOV; 35	CLT; 37	KAN; 38	TEX; 36			48th	13
2017	Matt Mills	15	Chevy																										CHI; 40	KEN							48th	13
2017	Joe Nemechek	15	Chevy																																PHO; 35		48th	13
2017	Harrison Rhodes	15	Chevy																																	HOM; 39	48th	13
2018	Joe Nemechek	15	Chevy	DAY; 23						BRI; 19	RCH; 25	TAL; 31	DOV; 31	CLT; 18																							30th	340
2018	Garrett Smithley	15	Chevy		ATL; 25	LVS; 23																															30th	340
2018	Matt Mills	15	Chevy				PHO; 38	CAL; 37	TEX; DNQ						POC; 27	MCH; 36																					30th	340
2018	B. J. McLeod	15	Chevy														IOW; 29	CHI; 25	DAY; 36	KEN; 21	NHA; 35				BRI; 19		DAR; 23	IND; 16	LVS; 19			DOV; 37					30th	340
2018	Brandon Hightower	15	Chevy																			IOW; 27															30th	340
2018	Mike Skeen	15	Chevy																				GLN; 28														30th	340
2018	Katherine Legge	15	Chevy																					MOH; 30		ROA; 14				RCH; 28	CLT; 33						30th	340
2018	Quin Houff	15	Chevy																														KAN; 14	TEX; 26	PHO; 29	HOM; 29	30th	340
2019	B. J. McLeod	15	Chevy	DAY; 27	ATL; 24	LVS; 20	PHO; 21	CAL; 24	TEX; 32	BRI; 18		TAL; 22	DOV; 27	CLT; 18	POC; 17	MCH; 19		CHI; 23	DAY; 33				GLN; 27	MOH; 26	BRI; 26	ROA; 23		IND; 22		RCH; 30	CLT; 23	DOV; 16					24th	421
2019	Tyler Matthews	15	Chevy								RCH; 24						IOW; 20				NHA; 32								LVS; 28				KAN; 28		PHO; 22	HOM; 37	24th	421
2019	Landon Cassill	15	Chevy																	KEN; 26																	24th	421
2019	Ryan Vargas	15	Chevy																			IOW; 17															24th	421
2019	Stephen Leicht	15	Chevy																								DAR; 26										24th	421
2019	Stefan Parsons	15	Chevy																															TEX; 23			24th	421
2020	Robby Lyons	15	Chevy	DAY; 17	LVS; 23	CAL; 23								TAL; 19																							31st	406
2020	Colby Howard	15	Chevy				PHO; 34	DAR; 27	CLT; 37	BRI; 19	ATL; 15	HOM; 17	HOM; 17				KEN; 32	KEN; 21	TEX; 23				DOV; 30	DOV; 26	DAY; 12	DAR; 19	RCH; 33	RCH; 35	BRI; 21	LVS; 21	TAL; 36			TEX; 28	MAR; 25	PHO; 20	31st	406
2020	Ryan Vargas	15	Chevy												POC; 13					KAN; 25																	31st	406
2020	Jeffrey Earnhardt	15	Chevy													IND; 38					ROA; 31	DAY; 32															31st	406
2020	Jesse Little	15	Chevy																													CLT; 30	KAN; 19				31st	406
2021	Colby Howard	15	Chevy	DAY; 35	DAY; 23	HOM; 36	LVS; 20	PHO; 16	ATL; 21	MAR; 39	TAL; 19	DAR; 29	DOV; 28	COA; 28	CLT; 30	MOH; 22	TEX; 28	NSH; DNQ	POC; 24	ROA; DNQ	ATL; 20	NHA; 30	GLN; 31		MCH; 25	DAY; 26	DAR; 27										37th	321
2021	Mike Skeen	15	Chevy																					IND; DNQ													37th	321
2021	Bayley Currey	15	Chevy																									RCH; 27		LVS; 13	TAL; 36		TEX; 17	KAN; 16	MAR; 35	PHO; 31	37th	321
2021	B. J. McLeod	15	Chevy																										BRI; 26								37th	321
2021	Kris Wright	15	Toyota																													CLT; 39					37th	321

=== Car No. 70 history ===
In mid-2003, Johnny Davis created a second car, then No. 70, for Morgan Shepherd to drive when Jason White was hired to pilot the primary No. 0 car. Shepherd would qualify for three races in the No. 70 before he left to drive for Dwayne Miller. Other drivers who drove the No. 70 for the remainder of 2003 were Jason Rudd, Don Satterfield, Jason White, Brad Teague, and Gus Wasson.

==== Car No. 70 results ====
NASCAR Xfinity Series results
Year	Driver	No.	Make	1	2	3	4	5	6	7	8	9	10	11	12	13	14	15	16	17	18	19	20	21	22	23	24	25	26	27	28	29	30	31	32	33	34	Owners	Pts
2003	Morgan Shepherd	70	Chevy	DAY	CAR	LVS	DAR	BRI	TEX	TAL	NSH	CAL	RCH	GTY	NZH	CLT	DOV; 38		KEN; 42	MLW; Wth	DAY	CHI	NHA; 37															N/A	N/A
2003	Don Satterfield	70	Chevy															NSH; 42																				N/A	N/A
2003	Mike Potter	70	Chevy																					PPR; 32														N/A	N/A
2003	Jason White	70	Chevy																						IRP; 30	MCH	BRI; DNQ											N/A	N/A
2003	Gus Wasson	70	Chevy																									DAR; 37	RCH		KAN; 40	CLT; DNQ	MEM	ATL	PHO	CAR	HOM	N/A	N/A
2003	Jason Rudd	70	Chevy																											DOV; 37								N/A	N/A
2004	Wayne Edwards	70	Chevy	DAY	CAR	LVS	DAR	BRI	TEX	NSH	TAL	CAL	GTY	RCH	NZH	CLT	DOV	NSH	KEN	MLW; Wth	DAY	CHI	NHA	PPR	IRP	MCH	BRI	CAL	RCH	DOV	KAN	CLT						N/A	N/A
2004	Stan Boyd	70	Chevy																														MEM; DNQ	ATL	PHO	DAR	HOM	N/A	N/A

=== Car No. 87 history ===
In an alliance with NEMCO Motorsports, Davis fielded a third car sharing the number 87 with NEMCO and Rick Ware Racing. Daryl Harr and Kevin Lepage each ran three races for the team, and Tim Schendel ran one race at Iowa.

==== Car No. 87 results ====
Year	Driver	No.	Make	1	2	3	4	5	6	7	8	9	10	11	12	13	14	15	16	17	18	19	20	21	22	23	24	25	26	27	28	29	30	31	32	33	Owners	Pts
2014	Daryl Harr	87	Chevy	DAY	PHO; 36	LVS; 30	BRI	CAL; 27																														
2014	Kevin Lepage	87	Chevy						TEX; 25	DAR; 19	RCH; 39	TAL																										
2014	Tim Schendel	87	Chevy										IOW; 34	CLT	DOV	MCH	ROA	KEN	DAY	NHA	CHI	IND	IOW	GLN	MOH	BRI	ATL	RCH	CHI	KEN	DOV	KAN	CLT	TEX	PHO	HOM		
