= 2021 Ambetter Get Vaccinated 200 =

Race details
- Race 19 of 33 of the 2021 NASCAR Xfinity Series
- Date: July 17, 2021
- Official name: Ambetter Get Vaccinated 200
- Location: Loudon, New Hampshire, New Hampshire Motor Speedway
- Course: Permanent racing facility
- Course length: 1.058 miles (1.703 km)
- Distance: 200 laps, 211.6 mi (340.537 km)
- Average speed: 102.031 miles per hour (164.203 km/h)

Pole position
Driver	Jeb Burton	Kaulig Racing
- Grid positions set by competition-based formula

Most laps led
Driver	Christopher Bell	Joe Gibbs Racing
- Laps: 151

Winner
No. 54	Christopher Bell	Joe Gibbs Racing

Television in the United States
- Network: NBCSN
- Announcers: Rick Allen, Jeff Burton, Dale Earnhardt Jr., Steve Letarte

Radio in the United States
- Radio: PRN

The 2021 Ambetter Get Vaccinated 200 was the 19th stock car race of the 2021 NASCAR Xfinity Series, and the 31st iteration of the event. After missing a race in 2020 due to the COVID-19 pandemic, New Hampshire Motor Speedway would be able to get back their race for the 2021 season. The race was held on Saturday, July 17, 2021, in Loudon, New Hampshire at New Hampshire Motor Speedway. Christopher Bell, running a one-off race for Joe Gibbs Racing, would dominate the race and win.

The race was the NASCAR Xfinity Series debut for Dawson Cram.

The layout of New Hampshire Motor Speedway, the venue where the race was held.

== Background ==
New Hampshire Motor Speedway is a 1.058-mile (1.703 km) oval speedway located in Loudon, New Hampshire, which has hosted NASCAR racing annually since the early 1990s, as well as the longest-running motorcycle race in North America, the Loudon Classic. Nicknamed "The Magic Mile", the speedway is often converted into a 1.6-mile (2.6 km) road course, which includes much of the oval.

The track was originally the site of Bryar Motorsports Park before being purchased and redeveloped by Bob Bahre. The track is currently one of eight major NASCAR tracks owned and operated by Speedway Motorsports.

For the second straight race, Michael Annett would have to be subbed in, this time by Josh Berry due to a leg injury Annett suffered.

=== Entry list ===
#	Driver	Team	Make	Sponsor
0	Jeffrey Earnhardt	JD Motorsports	Chevrolet	In Loving Memory of Latane Key
1	Josh Berry	JR Motorsports	Chevrolet	Pilot Flying J Spicy Chicken Sandwich
2	Myatt Snider	Richard Childress Racing	Chevrolet	Crosley Furniture
02	Brett Moffitt	Our Motorsports	Chevrolet	Robert B. Our Co., Acme-Storey Precast Concrete Products
4	Landon Cassill	JD Motorsports	Chevrolet	Voyager
5	Matt Mills	B. J. McLeod Motorsports	Toyota	J. F. Electric
6	Ryan Vargas	JD Motorsports	Chevrolet	JD Motorsports
7	Justin Allgaier	JR Motorsports	Chevrolet	Brandt Professional Agriculture
07	Joe Graf Jr.	SS-Green Light Racing	Chevrolet	Bucked Up Energy
8	Sam Mayer	JR Motorsports	Chevrolet	JR Motorsports
9	Noah Gragson	JR Motorsports	Chevrolet	Bass Pro Shops, TrueTimber Camo, Black Rifle Coffee Company
10	Jeb Burton	Kaulig Racing	Chevrolet	LS Tractors
11	Justin Haley	Kaulig Racing	Chevrolet	LeafFilter Gutter Protection
13	Chad Finchum	MBM Motorsports	Toyota	
15	Colby Howard	JD Motorsports	Chevrolet	Project Hope Foundation
16	A.J. Allmendinger	Kaulig Racing	Chevrolet	HyperIce
17	J. J. Yeley	SS-Green Light Racing with Rick Ware Racing	Ford	Nurtec ODT
18	Daniel Hemric	Joe Gibbs Racing	Toyota	Poppy Bank
19	Brandon Jones	Joe Gibbs Racing	Toyota	Menards, Jeld-Wen Windows & Doors
20	Harrison Burton	Joe Gibbs Racing	Toyota	DEX Imaging
22	Austin Cindric	Team Penske	Ford	Carshop
23	Patrick Emerling	Our Motorsports	Chevrolet	Spirit Snorkeling, Captain Pip's Marina & Hideaway
26	Brandon Gdovic	Sam Hunt Racing	Toyota	SnapMobile.shop
31	Jordan Anderson	Jordan Anderson Racing	Chevrolet	Bommarito Automotive Group
36	Alex Labbé	DGM Racing	Chevrolet	Prolon Controls
39	Ryan Sieg	RSS Racing	Ford	CMR Construction & Roofing
44	Tommy Joe Martins	Martins Motorsports	Chevrolet	AAN Adjusters
47	Kyle Weatherman	Mike Harmon Racing	Chevrolet	Axe Crossbows
48	Jade Buford	Big Machine Racing Team	Chevrolet	Big Machine Vodka Spiked Cooler
51	Jeremy Clements	Jeremy Clements Racing	Chevrolet	First Pacific Funding
52	Spencer Boyd	Jimmy Means Racing	Chevrolet	Freedom Warranty
54	Christopher Bell	Joe Gibbs Racing	Toyota	DeWalt
61	C. J. McLaughlin	Hattori Racing Enterprises	Toyota	Sci Aps
66	David Starr	MBM Motorsports	Toyota	Vodkyte
68	Brandon Brown	Brandonbilt Motorsports	Chevrolet	Jabs Construction, Inc.
74	Bayley Currey*	Mike Harmon Racing	Chevrolet	Crafty One Customs
78	Jesse Little	B. J. McLeod Motorsports	Toyota	B. J. McLeod Motorsports
90	Dexter Bean	DGM Racing	Chevrolet	DGM Racing
92	Josh Williams	DGM Racing	Chevrolet	Sleep Well Sleep Disorder Specialists
98	Riley Herbst	Stewart-Haas Racing	Ford	Monster Energy
99	Mason Massey	B. J. McLeod Motorsports	Toyota	Brunt Workwear "The Tools You Wear."
Official entry list

*Driver would change to Dawson Cram for the race.

== Starting lineup ==
The starting lineup was based on a formula based on the previous race, the 2021 Credit Karma Money 250. As a result, Jeb Burton of Kaulig Racing won the pole.

Pos.	#	Driver	Team	Make
1	10	Jeb Burton	Kaulig Racing	Chevrolet
2	11	Justin Haley	Kaulig Racing	Chevrolet
3	9	Noah Gragson	JR Motorsports	Chevrolet
4	22	Austin Cindric	Team Penske	Ford
5	7	Justin Allgaier	JR Motorsports	Chevrolet
6	16	A.J. Allmendinger	Kaulig Racing	Chevrolet
7	02	Brett Moffitt	Our Motorsports	Chevrolet
8	51	Jeremy Clements	Jeremy Clements Racing	Chevrolet
9	8	Sam Mayer	JR Motorsports	Chevrolet
10	20	Harrison Burton	Joe Gibbs Racing	Toyota
11	39	Ryan Sieg	RSS Racing	Ford
12	98	Riley Herbst	Stewart-Haas Racing	Ford
13	18	Daniel Hemric	Joe Gibbs Racing	Toyota
14	54	Christopher Bell	Joe Gibbs Racing	Toyota
15	36	Alex Labbé	DGM Racing	Chevrolet
16	2	Myatt Snider	Richard Childress Racing	Chevrolet
17	44	Tommy Joe Martins	Martins Motorsports	Chevrolet
18	48	Jade Buford	Big Machine Racing Team	Chevrolet
19	6	Ryan Vargas	JD Motorsports	Chevrolet
20	92	Josh Williams	DGM Racing	Chevrolet
21	1	Josh Berry	JR Motorsports	Chevrolet
22	68	Brandon Brown	Brandonbilt Motorsports	Chevrolet
23	19	Brandon Jones	Joe Gibbs Racing	Toyota
24	23	Patrick Emerling	Our Motorsports	Chevrolet
25	15	Colby Howard	JD Motorsports	Chevrolet
26	0	Jeffrey Earnhardt	JD Motorsports	Chevrolet
27	5	Matt Mills	B. J. McLeod Motorsports	Toyota
28	78	Jesse Little	B. J. McLeod Motorsports	Toyota
29	99	Mason Massey	B. J. McLeod Motorsports	Toyota
30	07	Joe Graf Jr.	SS-Green Light Racing	Chevrolet
31	4	Landon Cassill	JD Motorsports	Chevrolet
32	26	Brandon Gdovic	Sam Hunt Racing	Toyota
33	31	Jordan Anderson	Jordan Anderson Racing	Chevrolet
34	47	Kyle Weatherman	Mike Harmon Racing	Chevrolet
35	74	Dawson Cram	Mike Harmon Racing	Chevrolet
36	17	J. J. Yeley	SS-Green Light Racing with Rick Ware Racing	Ford
37	90	Dexter Bean	DGM Racing	Chevrolet
38	66	David Starr	MBM Motorsports	Toyota
39	61	C. J. McLaughlin	Hattori Racing Enterprises	Toyota
40	52	Spencer Boyd	Jimmy Means Racing	Chevrolet
Failed to qualify
41	13	Chad Finchum	MBM Motorsports	Toyota
Official starting lineup

== Race results ==
Stage 1 Laps: 45

Fin	#	Driver	Team	Make	Pts
1	54	Christopher Bell	Joe Gibbs Racing	Toyota	0
2	16	A.J. Allmendinger	Kaulig Racing	Chevrolet	9
3	20	Harrison Burton	Joe Gibbs Racing	Toyota	8
4	22	Austin Cindric	Team Penske	Ford	7
5	18	Daniel Hemric	Joe Gibbs Racing	Toyota	6
6	7	Justin Allgaier	JR Motorsports	Chevrolet	5
7	11	Justin Haley	Kaulig Racing	Chevrolet	4
8	10	Jeb Burton	Kaulig Racing	Chevrolet	3
9	1	Josh Berry	JR Motorsports	Chevrolet	2
10	51	Jeremy Clements	Jeremy Clements Racing	Chevrolet	1

Stage 2 Laps: 45

Fin	#	Driver	Team	Make	Pts
1	54	Christopher Bell	Joe Gibbs Racing	Toyota	0
2	22	Austin Cindric	Team Penske	Ford	9
3	18	Daniel Hemric	Joe Gibbs Racing	Toyota	8
4	16	A.J. Allmendinger	Kaulig Racing	Chevrolet	7
5	7	Justin Allgaier	JR Motorsports	Chevrolet	6
6	11	Justin Haley	Kaulig Racing	Chevrolet	5
7	1	Josh Berry	JR Motorsports	Chevrolet	4
8	20	Harrison Burton	Joe Gibbs Racing	Toyota	3
9	9	Noah Gragson	JR Motorsports	Chevrolet	2
10	10	Jeb Burton	Kaulig Racing	Chevrolet	1

Stage 3 Laps: 110

Fin	St	#	Driver	Team	Make	Laps	Led	Status	Pts
1	14	54	Christopher Bell	Joe Gibbs Racing	Toyota	200	151	running	0
2	5	7	Justin Allgaier	JR Motorsports	Chevrolet	200	0	running	46
3	13	18	Daniel Hemric	Joe Gibbs Racing	Toyota	200	0	running	48
4	4	22	Austin Cindric	Team Penske	Ford	200	0	running	49
5	10	20	Harrison Burton	Joe Gibbs Racing	Toyota	200	0	running	43
6	2	11	Justin Haley	Kaulig Racing	Chevrolet	200	0	running	40
7	16	2	Myatt Snider	Richard Childress Racing	Chevrolet	200	0	running	30
8	21	1	Josh Berry	JR Motorsports	Chevrolet	200	0	running	35
9	7	02	Brett Moffitt	Our Motorsports	Chevrolet	200	0	running	28
10	12	98	Riley Herbst	Stewart-Haas Racing	Ford	200	0	running	27
11	1	10	Jeb Burton	Kaulig Racing	Chevrolet	200	16	running	30
12	6	16	A.J. Allmendinger	Kaulig Racing	Chevrolet	200	29	running	41
13	11	39	Ryan Sieg	RSS Racing	Ford	200	0	running	24
14	3	9	Noah Gragson	JR Motorsports	Chevrolet	200	0	running	25
15	8	51	Jeremy Clements	Jeremy Clements Racing	Chevrolet	200	0	running	23
16	32	26	Brandon Gdovic	Sam Hunt Racing	Toyota	200	0	running	21
17	22	68	Brandon Brown	Brandonbilt Motorsports	Chevrolet	200	4	running	20
18	18	48	Jade Buford	Big Machine Racing Team	Chevrolet	198	0	running	19
19	34	47	Kyle Weatherman	Mike Harmon Racing	Chevrolet	198	0	running	18
20	38	66	David Starr	MBM Motorsports	Toyota	198	0	running	17
21	17	44	Tommy Joe Martins	Martins Motorsports	Chevrolet	197	0	running	16
22	20	92	Josh Williams	DGM Racing	Chevrolet	197	0	running	15
23	36	17	J. J. Yeley	SS-Green Light Racing with Rick Ware Racing	Ford	197	0	running	14
24	30	07	Joe Graf Jr.	SS-Green Light Racing	Chevrolet	197	0	running	13
25	31	4	Landon Cassill	JD Motorsports	Chevrolet	197	0	running	12
26	26	0	Jeffrey Earnhardt	JD Motorsports	Chevrolet	197	0	running	11
27	37	90	Dexter Bean	DGM Racing	Chevrolet	197	0	running	10
28	28	78	Jesse Little	B. J. McLeod Motorsports	Toyota	197	0	running	9
29	19	6	Ryan Vargas	JD Motorsports	Chevrolet	196	0	running	8
30	25	15	Colby Howard	JD Motorsports	Chevrolet	196	0	running	7
31	24	23	Patrick Emerling	Our Motorsports	Chevrolet	196	0	running	6
32	27	5	Matt Mills	B. J. McLeod Motorsports	Toyota	195	0	running	5
33	40	52	Spencer Boyd	Jimmy Means Racing	Chevrolet	194	0	running	0
34	33	31	Jordan Anderson	Jordan Anderson Racing	Chevrolet	194	0	running	0
35	35	74	Dawson Cram	Mike Harmon Racing	Chevrolet	184	0	running	0
36	15	36	Alex Labbé	DGM Racing	Chevrolet	174	0	running	1
37	39	61	C. J. McLaughlin	Hattori Racing Enterprises	Toyota	164	0	electrical	0
38	23	19	Brandon Jones	Joe Gibbs Racing	Toyota	102	0	running	1
39	9	8	Sam Mayer	JR Motorsports	Chevrolet	28	0	accident	1
40	29	99	Mason Massey	B. J. McLeod Motorsports	Toyota	26	0	accident	1
Failed to qualify
41		13	Chad Finchum	MBM Motorsports	Toyota				
Official race results

Previous race: 2021 Credit Karma Money 250	NASCAR Xfinity Series; 2021 season	Next race: 2021 Skrewball Peanut Butter Whiskey 200 at The Glen
