= 2020 Boyd Gaming 300 =

Race details
- Race 2 of 33 in the 2020 NASCAR Xfinity Series season
- Date: February 22, 2020-February 23, 2020
- Location: Las Vegas Motor Speedway in Las Vegas, Nevada
- Course: Permanent racing facility
- Course length: 1.5 miles (2.41 km)
- Distance: 200 laps, 300 mi (482.8 km)

Pole position
Driver	Myatt Snider	Richard Childress Racing
- Time: N/A

Most laps led
Driver	Chase Briscoe	Stewart-Haas Racing
- Laps: 89

Winner
No. 98	Chase Briscoe	Stewart-Haas Racing

Television in the United States
- Network: FS1/FS2
- Announcers: Adam Alexander, Austin Dillon, and Michael Waltrip

Radio in the United States
- Radio: PRN

The 2020 Boyd Gaming 300 was a NASCAR Xfinity Series race held between February 22, 2020, and February 23, 2020, at Las Vegas Motor Speedway in Las Vegas, NV. It was contested over 200 laps on the 1.5-mile (2.4 km) asphalt intermediate speedway. It was the second race of the 2020 NASCAR Xfinity Series season. Stewart-Haas Racing's Chase Briscoe took home his first victory of the season.

The race began on February 22, but was suspended due to rain after the end of stage 1. It was resumed at 7:50 ET on February 23 after the conclusion of the Cup Series race.

== Report ==
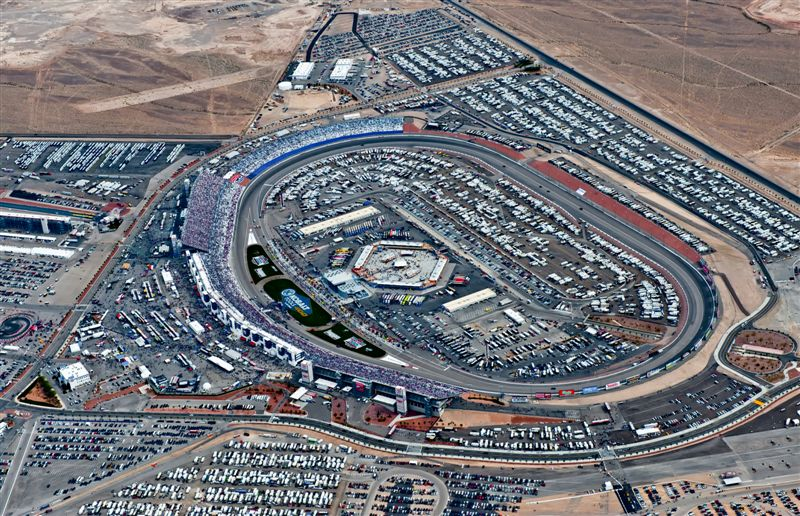
Las Vegas Motor Speedway, the track where the race was held.

=== Background ===
Las Vegas Motor Speedway, located in Clark County, Nevada outside the Las Vegas city limits and about 15 miles northeast of the Las Vegas Strip, is a 1,200-acre (490 ha) complex of multiple tracks for motorsports racing. The complex is owned by Speedway Motorsports, Inc., which is headquartered in Charlotte, North Carolina.

=== Entry list ===
- (R) denotes rookie driver.
- (i) denotes driver who is ineligible for series driver points.

No.	Driver	Team	Manufacturer	Sponsor
0	B. J. McLeod	JD Motorsports	Chevrolet	KDST CPA
1	Michael Annett	JR Motorsports	Chevrolet	American Heart Association/Pilot
02	Brett Moffitt (i)	Our Motorsports	Chevrolet	Robert B. Our Inc.
4	Jesse Little (R)	JD Motorsports	Chevrolet	Series Seating
5	Matt Mills	B. J. McLeod Motorsports	Chevrolet	J.F. Electric
6	David Starr	JD Motorsports	Chevrolet	Texas Elite Logistics/Rakeman Air
7	Justin Allgaier	JR Motorsports	Chevrolet	Brandt
07	Ray Black Jr.	SS-Green Light Racing	Chevrolet	CDA Technical Institute
8	Daniel Hemric	JR Motorsports	Chevrolet	South Point Hotel & Casino
08	Joe Graf Jr. (R)	SS-Green Light Racing	Chevrolet	CORE Development Group
9	Noah Gragson	JR Motorsports	Chevrolet	Bass Pro Shops/Black Rifle Coffee
10	Ross Chastain	Kaulig Racing	Chevrolet	Chevrolet Accessories
11	Justin Haley	Kaulig Racing	Chevrolet	Leaf Filter Gutter Protection
13	Chad Finchum	MBM Motorsports	Toyota	
15	Robby Lyons	JD Motorsports	Chevrolet	Sunwest Construction
18	Riley Herbst (R)	Joe Gibbs Racing	Toyota	Monster Energy
19	Brandon Jones	Joe Gibbs Racing	Toyota	Menards/Jeld-Wen
20	Harrison Burton (R)	Joe Gibbs Racing	Toyota	DEX Imaging
21	Myatt Snider	Richard Childress Racing	Chevrolet	TaxSlayer
22	Austin Cindric	Team Penske	Ford	MoneyLion
39	Ryan Sieg	RSS Racing	Chevrolet	CMR Construction Roofing
44	Tommy Joe Martins	Martins Motorsports	Chevrolet	AAN Adjusters
47	Joe Nemechek (i)	Mike Harmon Racing	Chevrolet	The Journey Home Project
51	Jeremy Clements	Jeremy Clements Racing	Chevrolet	Repairables.com
52	J. J. Yeley	Means Racing	Chevrolet	
61	Timmy Hill (i)	Hattori Racing	Toyota	CrashClaimsR.Us
66	Stephen Leicht	MBM Motorsports	Toyota	
68	Brandon Brown	Brandonbilt Motorsports	Chevrolet	VERO
74	Kyle Weatherman	Mike Harmon Racing	Chevrolet	Findlay Cadillac/Lerner & Rowe Injury Attorneys
78	Vinnie Miller	B. J. McLeod Motorsports	Chevrolet	Koolbox ICE
89	Landon Cassill	Shepherd Racing	Chevrolet	Racing with Jesus/Visone RV
90	Alex Labbé	DGM Racing	Chevrolet	Le Concorde/Rousseau Metal/La Rue
92	Josh Williams	DGM Racing	Chevrolet	Silverton Hotel & Casino
93	Joey Gase	RSS Racing	Chevrolet	Nevada Donor Network
98	Chase Briscoe	Stewart-Haas Racing	Ford	Ford Performance Racing School
99	Mason Massey	B. J. McLeod Motorsports	Toyota	Gerber Collision & Glass
Official entry list

== Practice ==
=== Final Practice ===
Ross Chastain was the fastest in the only practice session with a time of 30.529 seconds and a speed of 176.881 mph (284.662 km/h).

Pos	No.	Driver	Team	Manufacturer	Time	Speed
1	10	Ross Chastain	Kaulig Racing	Chevrolet	30.529	176.881
2	68	Brandon Brown	Brandonbilt Motorsports	Chevrolet	30.557	176.719
3	98	Chase Briscoe	Stewart-Haas Racing	Ford	30.565	176.673
Official final practice results

== Qualifying ==
Qualifying for Saturday was cancelled due to rain and Myatt Snider was awarded the pole by virtue of the final 2019 owner points standings.

=== Starting Lineup ===
Pos	No	Driver	Team	Manufacturer
1	21	Myatt Snider	Richard Childress Racing	Chevrolet
2	98	Chase Briscoe	Stewart-Haas Racing	Ford
3	20	Harrison Burton (R)	Joe Gibbs Racing	Toyota
4	7	Justin Allgaier	JR Motorsports	Chevrolet
5	52	J. J. Yeley	Means Racing	Chevrolet
6	22	Austin Cindric	Team Penske	Ford
7	9	Noah Gragson	JR Motorsports	Chevrolet
8	1	Michael Annett	JR Motorsports	Chevrolet
9	19	Brandon Jones	Joe Gibbs Racing	Toyota
10	8	Daniel Hemric	JR Motorsports	Chevrolet
11	11	Justin Haley	Kaulig Racing	Chevrolet
12	18	Riley Herbst (R)	Joe Gibbs Racing	Toyota
13	02	Brett Moffitt (i)	Our Motorsports	Chevrolet
14	93	Joey Gase	RSS Racing	Chevrolet
15	08	Joe Graf Jr. (R)	SS-Green Light Racing	Chevrolet
16	51	Jeremy Clements	Jeremy Clements Racing	Chevrolet
17	15	Robby Lyons	JD Motorsports	Chevrolet
18	07	Ray Black Jr.	SS-Green Light Racing	Chevrolet
19	68	Brandon Brown	Brandonbilt Motorsports	Chevrolet
20	92	Josh Williams	DGM Racing	Chevrolet
21	6	David Starr	JD Motorsports	Chevrolet
22	4	Jesse Little (R)	JD Motorsports	Chevrolet
23	90	Alex Labbé	DGM Racing	Chevrolet
24	0	B. J. McLeod	JD Motorsports	Chevrolet
25	10	Ross Chastain	Kaulig Racing	Chevrolet
26	5	Matt Mills	B. J. McLeod Motorsports	Chevrolet
27	78	Vinnie Miller	B. J. McLeod Motorsports	Chevrolet
28	99	Mason Massey	B. J. McLeod Motorsports	Toyota
29	61	Timmy Hill (i)	Hattori Racing	Toyota
30	66	Stephen Leicht	MBM Motorsports	Toyota
31	47	Joe Nemechek (i)	Mike Harmon Racing	Chevrolet
32	39	Ryan Sieg	RSS Racing	Chevrolet
33	74	Kyle Weatherman	Mike Harmon Racing	Chevrolet
34	13	Chad Finchum	MBM Motorsports	Toyota
35	44	Tommy Joe Martins	Martins Motorsports	Chevrolet
36	89	Landon Cassill	Shepherd Racing	Chevrolet
Official starting lineup

- Polesitter Myatt Snider started from the rear after going to a backup car.
- Joe Nemechek started from the rear after missing driver intros.

== Race ==
=== Race results ===
==== Stage Results ====
Stage One

Laps: 45

Pos	No	Driver	Team	Manufacturer	Points
1	98	Chase Briscoe	Stewart-Haas Racing	Chevrolet	10
2	10	Ross Chastain	Kaulig Racing	Chevrolet	9
3	22	Austin Cindric	Team Penske	Ford	8
4	19	Brandon Jones	Joe Gibbs Racing	Toyota	7
5	7	Justin Allgaier	JR Motorsports	Chevrolet	6
6	1	Michael Annett	JR Motorsports	Chevrolet	5
7	20	Harrison Burton (R)	Joe Gibbs Racing	Toyota	4
8	9	Noah Gragson	JR Motorsports	Chevrolet	3
9	11	Justin Haley	Kaulig Racing	Chevrolet	2
10	18	Riley Herbst (R)	Joe Gibbs Racing	Toyota	1

Stage Two

Laps: 45

Pos	No	Driver	Team	Manufacturer	Points
1	7	Justin Allgaier	JR Motorsports	Chevrolet	10
2	22	Austin Cindric	Team Penske	Ford	9
3	98	Chase Briscoe	Stewart-Haas Racing	Ford	8
4	1	Michael Annett	JR Motorsports	Chevrolet	7
5	20	Harrison Burton (R)	Joe Gibbs Racing	Toyota	6
6	10	Ross Chastain	Kaulig Racing	Chevrolet	5
7	39	Ryan Sieg	RSS Racing	Chevrolet	4
8	18	Riley Herbst (R)	Joe Gibbs Racing	Toyota	3
9	19	Brandon Jones	Joe Gibbs Racing	Toyota	2
10	21	Myatt Snider	Richard Childress Racing	Chevrolet	1

=== Final Stage Results ===
Laps: 123

Pos	Grid	No	Driver	Team	Manufacturer	Laps	Points	Status
1	2	98	Chase Briscoe	Stewart-Haas Racing	Ford	200	58	Running
2	6	22	Austin Cindric	Team Penske	Ford	200	52	Running
3	32	39	Ryan Sieg	RSS Racing	Chevrolet	200	38	Running
4	7	9	Noah Gragson	JR Motorsports	Chevrolet	200	36	Running
5	3	20	Harrison Burton (R)	Joe Gibbs Racing	Toyota	200	42	Running
6	9	19	Brandon Jones	Joe Gibbs Racing	Toyota	200	40	Running
7	8	1	Michael Annett	JR Motorsports	Chevrolet	200	42	Running
8	4	7	Justin Allgaier	JR Motorsports	Chevrolet	200	45	Running
9	12	18	Riley Herbst (R)	Joe Gibbs Racing	Toyota	200	32	Running
10	25	10	Ross Chastain	Kaulig Racing	Chevrolet	200	41	Running
11	19	68	Brandon Brown	Brandonbilt Motorsports	Chevrolet	200	26	Running
12	11	11	Justin Haley	Kaulig Racing	Chevrolet	199	27	Running
13	20	92	Josh Williams	DGM Racing	Chevrolet	199	24	Running
14	22	4	Jesse Little (R)	JD Motorsports	Chevrolet	199	23	Running
15	13	02	Brett Moffitt (i)	Our Motorsports	Chevrolet	199	0	Running
16	1	21	Myatt Snider	Richard Childress Racing	Chevrolet	199	22	Running
17	18	07	Ray Black Jr.	SS-Green Light Racing	Chevrolet	199	20	Running
18	23	90	Alex Labbé	DGM Racing	Chevrolet	198	19	Running
19	14	93	Joey Gase	RSS Racing	Chevrolet	198	18	Running
20	15	08	Joe Graf Jr. (R)	SS-Green Light Racing	Chevrolet	198	17	Running
21	34	13	Chad Finchum	MBM Motorsports	Toyota	198	16	Running
22	5	52	J. J. Yeley	Means Racing	Chevrolet	197	15	Running
23	17	15	Robby Lyons	JD Motorsports	Chevrolet	197	14	Running
24	21	6	David Starr	JD Motorsports	Chevrolet	196	13	Running
25	26	5	Matt Mills	B. J. McLeod Motorsports	Chevrolet	196	12	Running
26	29	61	Timmy Hill (i)	Hattori Racing	Toyota	195	0	Running
27	31	47	Joe Nemechek (i)	Mike Harmon Racing	Chevrolet	193	0	Running
28	27	78	Vinnie Miller	B. J. McLeod Motorsports	Chevrolet	192	9	Running
29	28	99	Mason Massey	B. J. McLeod Motorsports	Toyota	190	8	Running
30	33	74	Kyle Weatherman	Mike Harmon Racing	Chevrolet	190	7	Running
31	16	51	Jeremy Clements	Jeremy Clements Racing	Chevrolet	178	6	Rear Gear
32	35	44	Tommy Joe Martins	Martins Motorsports	Chevrolet	144	5	Engine
33	24	0	B. J. McLeod	JD Motorsports	Chevrolet	132	4	Ignition
34	30	66	Stephen Leicht	MBM Motorsports	Toyota	101	3	Suspension
35	10	8	Daniel Hemric	JR Motorsports	Chevrolet	34	2	Suspension
36	36	89	Landon Cassill	Shepherd Racing	Chevrolet	31	1	Vibration
Official race results

=== Race statistics ===
- Lead changes: 17 among 7 different drivers
- Cautions/Laps: 5 for 28
- Red flags: 0
- Time of race: 2 hours, 19 minutes, and 44 seconds
- Average speed: 128.817 mph (207.311 km/h)

== Media ==
=== Television ===
The Boyd Gaming 300 was carried by FS1 in the United States on Saturday (Feb. 22), and resumed on FS2 on Sunday (Feb. 23). Adam Alexander, Richard Childress Racing Driver Austin Dillon, and Michael Waltrip called the race from the booth, with Matt Yocum and Jamie Little covering pit road.

FS1/FS2
Booth announcers	Pit reporters
Lap-by-lap: Adam Alexander Color-commentator: Austin Dillon Color-commentator: Michael Waltrip	Matt Yocum Jamie Little

=== Radio ===
The Performance Racing Network (PRN) called the race for radio, which was simulcast on SiriusXM NASCAR Radio.

== Standings after the race ==
Drivers' Championship standings

	Pos	Driver	Points
7	1	Chase Briscoe	92
1	2	Noah Gragson	85 (-7)
	3	Harrison Burton (R)	80 (-12)
3	4	Michael Annett	77 (-15)
1	5	Brandon Jones	76 (-16)
10	6	Austin Cindric	75 (-17)
1	7	Ryan Sieg	73 (-19)
6	8	Justin Haley	73 (-19)
4	9	Justin Allgaier	70 (-22)
5	10	Brandon Brown	61 (-31)
9	11	Ross Chastain	60 (-32)
2	12	Ray Black Jr.	49 (-43)
Official driver's standings

Note: Only the first 12 positions are included for the driver standings.

Previous race: 2020 NASCAR Racing Experience 300	NASCAR Xfinity Series; 2020 season	Next race: 2020 Production Alliance Group 300
