= 2019 Ford EcoBoost 300 =

Race details
- Race 33 of 33 in the 2019 NASCAR Xfinity Series season
- Date: November 16, 2019
- Location: Homestead-Miami Speedway in Homestead, Florida
- Course: Permanent racing facility
- Course length: 1.5 miles (2.4 km)
- Distance: 200 laps, 300 mi (480 km)

Pole position
Driver	Tyler Reddick	Richard Childress Racing
- Time: 32.322

Most laps led
Driver	Tyler Reddick	Richard Childress Racing
- Laps: 84

Winner
No. 2	Tyler Reddick	Richard Childress Racing

Television in the United States
- Network: NBCSN

Radio in the United States
- Radio: MRN

The 2019 Ford EcoBoost 300 is a NASCAR Xfinity Series race held on November 16, 2019, at Homestead-Miami Speedway in Homestead, Florida. Contested over 200 laps on the 1.5 mile (2.4 km) oval, it was the 33rd and final race of the 2019 NASCAR Xfinity Series season.

== Background ==
=== Track ===
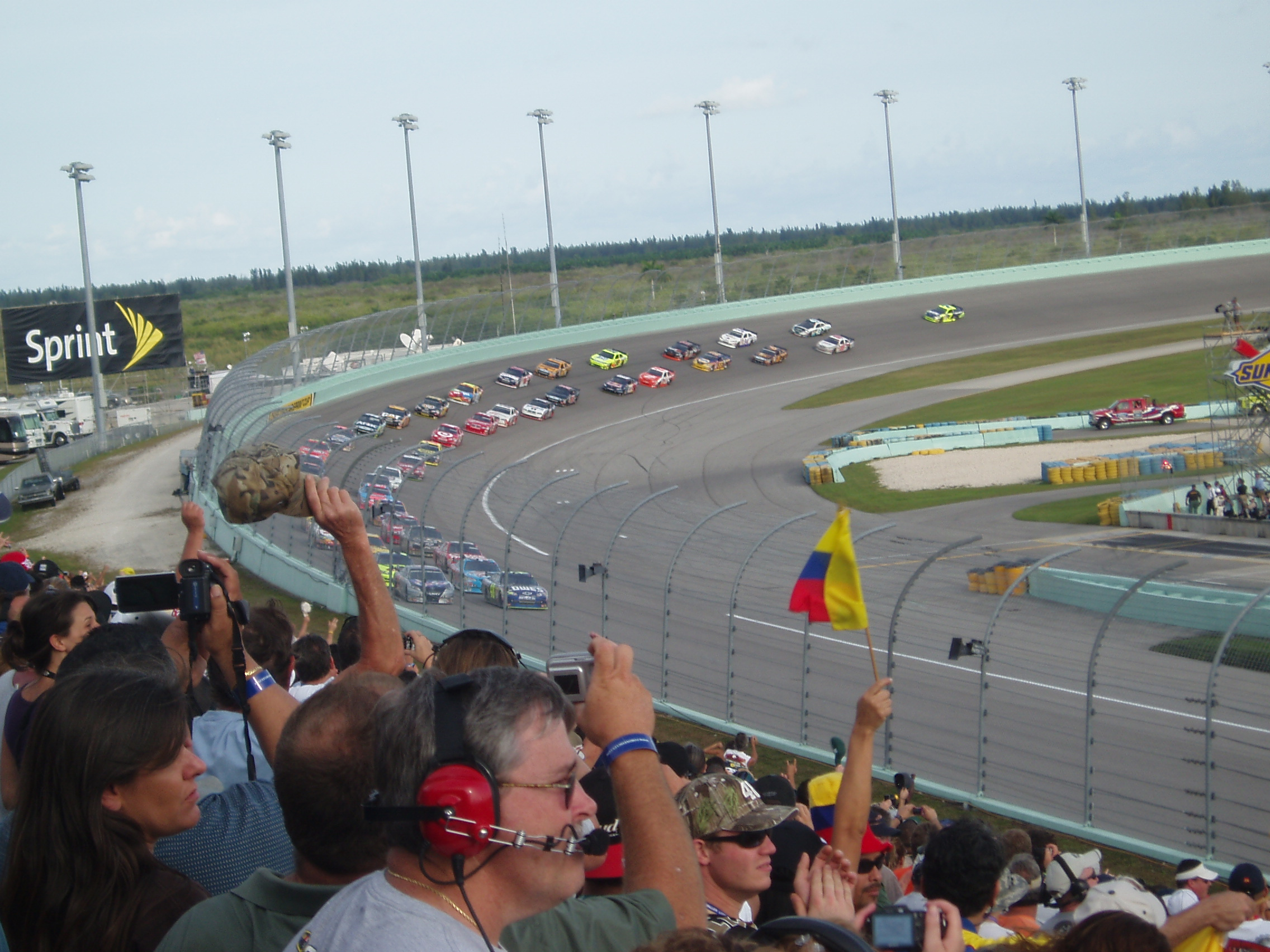
Homestead-Miami Speedway, the track where the race was held.

Homestead-Miami Speedway is a motor racing track located in Homestead, Florida. The track, which has several configurations, has promoted several series of racing, including NASCAR, the Verizon IndyCar Series, the Grand-Am Rolex Sports Car Series and the Championship Cup Series.

From 2002 to 2019, Homestead–Miami Speedway hosted the final race of the season in all three of NASCAR's series: the Cup Series, the Xfinity Series, and the Gander Outdoors Truck Series. Ford Motor Company sponsored all three of the season-ending races, under the names Ford EcoBoost 400, Ford EcoBoost 300, and Ford EcoBoost 200, respectively. The weekend itself was marketed as Ford Championship Weekend. The Xfinity Series held its season-ending races at Homestead from 1995 until 2020, when it was moved to Phoenix Raceway, along with NASCAR's other two series.

== Entry list ==
No.	Driver	Team	Manufacturer
00	Cole Custer	Stewart-Haas Racing with Biagi-DenBeste Racing	Ford
0	Garrett Smithley	JD Motorsports	Chevrolet
01	Stephen Leicht	JD Motorsports	Chevrolet
1	Michael Annett	JR Motorsports	Chevrolet
2	Tyler Reddick	Richard Childress Racing	Chevrolet
4	B. J. McLeod	JD Motorsports	Chevrolet
5	Vinnie Miller	B. J. McLeod Motorsports	Chevrolet
07	Ray Black Jr.	SS-Green Light Racing	Chevrolet
7	Justin Allgaier	JR Motorsports	Chevrolet
08	Gray Gaulding (R)	SS-Green Light Racing	Chevrolet
8	Jeb Burton	JR Motorsports	Chevrolet
9	Noah Gragson (R)	JR Motorsports	Chevrolet
11	Justin Haley (R)	Kaulig Racing	Chevrolet
13	Timmy Hill	MBM Motorsports	Toyota
15	Tyler Matthews	JD Motorsports	Chevrolet
17	Robby Lyons (i)	Rick Ware Racing	Chevrolet
18	Harrison Burton (i)	Joe Gibbs Racing	Toyota
19	Brandon Jones	Joe Gibbs Racing	Toyota
20	Christopher Bell	Joe Gibbs Racing	Toyota
22	Austin Cindric	Team Penske	Ford
23	John Hunter Nemechek (R)	GMS Racing	Chevrolet
26	Colin Garrett	Sam Hunt Racing	Toyota
35	Joey Gase	MBM Motorsports	Toyota
36	Josh Williams	DGM Racing	Chevrolet
38	J. J. Yeley	RSS Racing	Chevrolet
39	Ryan Sieg	RSS Racing	Chevrolet
51	Jeremy Clements	Jeremy Clements Racing	Chevrolet
52	David Starr	Jimmy Means Racing	Chevrolet
61	Chad Finchum	MBM Motorsports	Toyota
66	Bobby Dale Earnhardt	MBM Motorsports	Toyota
68	Brandon Brown	Brandonbilt Motorsports	Chevrolet
74	Joe Nemechek (i)	Mike Harmon Racing	Chevrolet
78	Matt Mills	B. J. McLeod Motorsports	Chevrolet
86	Will Rodgers	Brandonbilt Motorsports	Chevrolet
89	Landon Cassill	Shepherd Racing Ventures	Chevrolet
90	Alex Labbé	DGM Racing	Chevrolet
93	C. J. McLaughlin	RSS Racing	Chevrolet
98	Chase Briscoe (R)	Stewart-Haas Racing with Biagi-DenBeste Racing	Ford
99	Jairo Avila Jr.	B. J. McLeod Motorsports	Chevrolet

== Practice ==
Tyler Reddick was the fastest in the practice session with a time of 32.594 seconds and a speed of 165.675 mph (266.628 km/h).

Pos	No.	Driver	Team	Manufacturer	Time	Speed
1	2	Tyler Reddick	Richard Childress Racing	Chevrolet	32.594	165.675
2	20	Christopher Bell	Joe Gibbs Racing	Toyota	32.692	165.178
3	22	Austin Cindric	Team Penske	Ford	32.764	164.815

== Qualifying ==
Tyler Reddick scored the pole for the race with a time of 32.322 seconds and a speed of 167.069 mph (268.871 km/h).

=== Qualifying results ===
Pos	No	Driver	Team	Manufacturer	Time
1	2	Tyler Reddick	Richard Childress Racing	Chevrolet	32.322
2	00	Cole Custer	Stewart-Haas Racing with Biagi-DenBeste Racing	Ford	32.395
3	22	Austin Cindric	Team Penske	Ford	32.469
4	19	Brandon Jones	Joe Gibbs Racing	Toyota	32.562
5	98	Chase Briscoe (R)	Stewart-Haas Racing with Biagi-DenBeste Racing	Ford	32.602
6	23	John Hunter Nemechek (R)	GMS Racing	Chevrolet	32.636
7	20	Christopher Bell	Joe Gibbs Racing	Toyota	32.724
8	11	Justin Haley (R)	Kaulig Racing	Chevrolet	32.728
9	18	Harrison Burton (i)	Joe Gibbs Racing	Toyota	32.780
10	9	Noah Gragson (R)	JR Motorsports	Chevrolet	32.857
11	51	Jeremy Clements	Jeremy Clements Racing	Chevrolet	32.916
12	4	B. J. McLeod	JD Motorsports	Chevrolet	32.940
13	89	Landon Cassill	Shepherd Racing Ventures	Chevrolet	33.008
14	39	Ryan Sieg	RSS Racing	Chevrolet	33.046
15	26	Colin Garrett	Sam Hunt Racing	Toyota	33.111
16	7	Justin Allgaier	JR Motorsports	Chevrolet	33.143
17	90	Alex Labbé	DGM Racing	Chevrolet	33.211
18	8	Jeb Burton	JR Motorsports	Chevrolet	33.227
19	38	J. J. Yeley	RSS Racing	Chevrolet	33.315
20	1	Michael Annett	JR Motorsports	Chevrolet	33.410
21	01	Stephen Leicht	JD Motorsports	Chevrolet	33.421
22	36	Josh Williams	DGM Racing	Chevrolet	33.478
23	68	Brandon Brown (R)	Brandonbilt Motorsports	Chevrolet	33.490
24	13	Timmy Hill	MBM Motorsports	Toyota	33.556
25	52	David Starr	Jimmy Means Racing	Chevrolet	33.591
26	08	Gray Gaulding (R)	SS-Green Light Racing	Chevrolet	33.597
27	93	C. J. McLaughlin	RSS Racing	Chevrolet	33.617
28	78	Matt Mills	B. J. McLeod Motorsports	Chevrolet	33.687
29	61	Chad Finchum	MBM Motorsports	Toyota	33.704
30	07	Ray Black Jr.	SS-Green Light Racing	Chevrolet	33.719
31	0	Garrett Smithley	JD Motorsports	Chevrolet	33.724
32	86	Will Rodgers	Brandonbilt Motorsports	Chevrolet	34.068
33	17	Robby Lyons (i)	Rick Ware Racing	Chevrolet	34.202
34	15	Tyler Matthews	JD Motorsports	Chevrolet	34.336
35	35	Joey Gase	MBM Motorsports	Toyota	34.402
36	99	Jairo Avila Jr.	B. J. McLeod Motorsports	Chevrolet	34.452
37	5	Vinnie Miller	B. J. McLeod Motorsports	Chevrolet	34.565
38	74	Joe Nemechek (i)	Mike Harmon Racing	Chevrolet	35.334
Did not qualify
39	66	Bobby Dale Earnhardt	MBM Motorsports	Toyota	34.455

. – Playoffs driver

== Race ==
=== Summary ===
Tyler Reddick started on pole, and was challenging by Cole Custer in the opening laps. On lap 32, a caution was thrown for debris being stuck in the wall, causing Reddick and Custer to pit while Christopher Bell and Justin Allgaier stayed out. Custer managed to charge back to the front, only finishing behind teammate Chase Briscoe in Stage 1.

On lap 59, Custer made a pit stop for a loose wheel, causing him to go down one lap. He managed to weave past Austin Cindric and restarted in the final stage on the lead lap.

In the closing laps, Custer caught up to Reddick and took the lead. Reddick slid past Custer with under 20 laps remaining and pulled away, winning the race and the championship.

=== Stage Results ===
Stage One Laps: 45

Pos	No	Driver	Team	Manufacturer	Points
1	98	Chase Briscoe (R)	Stewart-Haas Racing with Biagi-DenBeste Racing	Ford	10
2	00	Cole Custer	Stewart-Haas Racing with Biagi-DenBeste Racing	Ford	0
3	11	Justin Haley (R)	Kaulig Racing	Chevrolet	8
4	2	Tyler Reddick	Richard Childress Racing	Chevrolet	0
5	23	John Hunter Nemechek (R)	GMS Racing	Chevrolet	6
6	19	Brandon Jones	Joe Gibbs Racing	Toyota	5
7	8	Jeb Burton	JR Motorsports	Chevrolet	4
8	51	Jeremy Clements	Jeremy Clements Racing	Chevrolet	3
9	22	Austin Cindric	Team Penske	Ford	2
10	36	Josh Williams	DGM Racing	Chevrolet	1

Stage Two Laps: 45

Pos	No	Driver	Team	Manufacturer	Points
1	22	Austin Cindric	Team Penske	Ford	10
2	20	Christopher Bell	Joe Gibbs Racing	Toyota	0
3	7	Justin Allgaier	JR Motorsports	Chevrolet	0
4	2	Tyler Reddick	Richard Childress Racing	Chevrolet	0
5	98	Chase Briscoe (R)	Stewart-Haas Racing with Biagi-DenBeste Racing	Ford	6
6	9	Noah Gragson (R)	JR Motorsports	Chevrolet	5
7	23	John Hunter Nemechek (R)	GMS Racing	Chevrolet	4
8	1	Michael Annett	JR Motorsports	Chevrolet	3
9	18	Harrison Burton (i)	Joe Gibbs Racing	Toyota	0
10	11	Justin Haley (R)	Kaulig Racing	Chevrolet	1

=== Final Stage Results ===
Stage Three Laps: 110

Pos	Grid	No	Driver	Team	Manufacturer	Laps	Points
1	1	2	Tyler Reddick	Richard Childress Racing	Chevrolet	200	40
2	2	00	Cole Custer	Stewart-Haas Racing with Biagi-DenBeste Racing	Ford	200	35
3	5	98	Chase Briscoe (R)	Stewart-Haas Racing with Biagi-DenBeste Racing	Ford	200	50
4	10	9	Noah Gragson (R)	JR Motorsports	Chevrolet	200	38
5	7	20	Christopher Bell	Joe Gibbs Racing	Toyota	200	32
6	6	23	John Hunter Nemechek (R)	GMS Racing	Chevrolet	200	41
7	3	22	Austin Cindric	Team Penske	Ford	200	42
8	4	19	Brandon Jones	Joe Gibbs Racing	Toyota	200	34
9	18	8	Jeb Burton	JR Motorsports	Chevrolet	199	32
10	9	18	Harrison Burton (i)	Joe Gibbs Racing	Toyota	199	0
11	20	1	Michael Annett	JR Motorsports	Chevrolet	199	29
12	14	39	Ryan Sieg	RSS Racing	Chevrolet	199	24
13	23	68	Brandon Brown (R)	Brandonbilt Motorsports	Chevrolet	199	23
14	16	7	Justin Allgaier	JR Motorsports	Chevrolet	199	25
15	13	89	Landon Cassill	Shepherd Racing Ventures	Chevrolet	199	22
16	11	51	Jeremy Clements	Jeremy Clements Racing	Chevrolet	198	24
17	26	08	Gray Gaulding (R)	SS-Green Light Racing	Chevrolet	198	20
18	17	90	Alex Labbé	DGM Racing	Chevrolet	198	19
19	22	36	Josh Williams	DGM Racing	Chevrolet	198	19
20	12	4	B. J. McLeod	JD Motorsports	Chevrolet	198	17
21	15	26	Colin Garrett	Sam Hunt Racing	Toyota	198	16
22	32	86	Will Rodgers	Brandonbilt Motorsports	Chevrolet	197	15
23	25	52	David Starr	Jimmy Means Racing	Chevrolet	196	14
24	21	01	Stephen Leicht	JD Motorsports	Chevrolet	195	13
25	36	99	Jairo Avila Jr.	B. J. McLeod Motorsports	Chevrolet	195	12
26	37	5	Vinnie Miller	B. J. McLeod Motorsports	Chevrolet	193	11
27	35	35	Joey Gase	MBM Motorsports	Toyota	193	10
28	33	17	Robby Lyons (i)	Rick Ware Racing	Chevrolet	192	0
29	38	74	Joe Nemechek (i)	Mike Harmon Racing	Chevrolet	192	0
30	28	78	Matt Mills	B. J. McLeod Motorsports	Chevrolet	141	7
31	27	93	C. J. McLaughlin	RSS Racing	Chevrolet	131	6
32	31	0	Garrett Smithley	JD Motorsports	Chevrolet	112	5
33	8	11	Justin Haley (R)	Kaulig Racing	Chevrolet	95	13
34	24	13	Timmy Hill	MBM Motorsports	Toyota	57	3
35	29	61	Chad Finchum	MBM Motorsports	Toyota	53	2
36	19	38	J. J. Yeley	RSS Racing	Chevrolet	20	1
37	34	15	Tyler Matthews	JD Motorsports	Chevrolet	14	1
38	30	07	Ray Black Jr.	SS-Green Light Racing	Chevrolet	4	1

. – Driver won the championship

. – Playoffs driver

Previous race: 2019 Desert Diamond Casino West Valley 200	NASCAR Xfinity Series; 2019 season	Next race: 2020 NASCAR Racing Experience 300
