= 2020 Production Alliance Group 300 =

NASCAR Xfinity Series race

Race details
- Race 3 of 33 in the 2020 NASCAR Xfinity Series season
- Track map of the speedway at Auto Club Speedway AKA California Speedway
- Date: February 29, 2020
- Location: Auto Club Speedway in Fontana, California
- Course: Permanent racing facility
- Course length: 2 miles (3.22 km)
- Distance: 150 laps, 300 mi (483 km)

Pole position
Driver	Brandon Jones	Joe Gibbs Racing
- Time: 39.948

Most laps led
Driver	Brandon Jones	Joe Gibbs Racing
- Laps: 73

Winner
No. 20	Harrison Burton	Joe Gibbs Racing

Television in the United States
- Network: FS1
- Announcers: Adam Alexander, Joey Logano, and Chad Knaus

Radio in the United States
- Radio: MRN
- Booth announcers: Dan Hubbard and Steve Post
- Turn announcers: Kyle Rickey and Alex Hayden

The 2020 Production Alliance Group 300 was a NASCAR Xfinity Series race held on February 29, 2020 at Auto Club Speedway in Fontana, California. Contested over 150 laps on the 2-mile (3.2 km) asphalt superspeedway, it was the third race of the 2020 NASCAR Xfinity Series season. Rookie driver Harrison Burton won his first ever race in the NASCAR Xfinity series.

== Report ==
=== Background ===
Auto Club Speedway (previously California Speedway) was a two-mile (3.2 km), low-banked, D-shaped oval superspeedway in Fontana, California which hosted NASCAR racing annually from 1997 to 2023. It was also used for open wheel racing events. The racetrack was located near the former locations of Ontario Motor Speedway and Riverside International Raceway. The track was owned and operated by International Speedway Corporation and was the only track owned by ISC to have its naming rights sold. The speedway was served by the nearby Interstate 10 and Interstate 15 freeways as well as a Metrolink station located behind the backstretch.

=== Entry list ===
- (R) denotes rookie driver.
- (i) denotes driver who is ineligible for series driver points.

No.	Driver	Team	Manufacturer
0	B. J. McLeod	JD Motorsports	Chevrolet
1	Michael Annett	JR Motorsports	Chevrolet
02	Brett Moffitt (i)	Our Motorsports	Chevrolet
4	Jesse Little (R)	JD Motorsports	Chevrolet
5	Matt Mills	B. J. McLeod Motorsports	Chevrolet
6	David Starr	JD Motorsports	Chevrolet
7	Justin Allgaier	JR Motorsports	Chevrolet
07	Ray Black Jr.	SS-Green Light Racing	Chevrolet
8	Daniel Hemric	JR Motorsports	Chevrolet
08	Joe Graf Jr. (R)	SS-Green Light Racing	Chevrolet
9	Noah Gragson	JR Motorsports	Chevrolet
10	Ross Chastain	Kaulig Racing	Chevrolet
11	Justin Haley	Kaulig Racing	Chevrolet
13	Chad Finchum	MBM Motorsports	Toyota
15	Robby Lyons	JD Motorsports	Chevrolet
18	Riley Herbst (R)	Joe Gibbs Racing	Toyota
19	Brandon Jones	Joe Gibbs Racing	Toyota
20	Harrison Burton (R)	Joe Gibbs Racing	Toyota
21	Anthony Alfredo	Richard Childress Racing	Chevrolet
22	Austin Cindric	Team Penske	Ford
39	Ryan Sieg	RSS Racing	Chevrolet
44	Tommy Joe Martins	Martins Motorsports	Chevrolet
47	Bayley Currey (i)	Mike Harmon Racing	Chevrolet
51	Jeremy Clements	Jeremy Clements Racing	Chevrolet
52	J. J. Yeley	Means Racing	Chevrolet
61	Austin Hill (i)	Hattori Racing	Toyota
66	Stephen Leicht	MBM Motorsports	Toyota
68	Brandon Brown	Brandonbilt Motorsports	Chevrolet
74	Kyle Weatherman	Mike Harmon Racing	Chevrolet
78	Vinnie Miller	B. J. McLeod Motorsports	Chevrolet
89	Landon Cassill	Shepherd Racing	Chevrolet
90	Alex Labbé	DGM Racing	Chevrolet
92	Josh Williams	DGM Racing	Chevrolet
93	Myatt Snider	RSS Racing	Chevrolet
98	Chase Briscoe	Stewart-Haas Racing	Ford
99	Josh Bilicki	B. J. McLeod Motorsports	Toyota
Official entry list

== Practice ==
=== First practice ===
Noah Gragson was the fastest in the first practice session with a time of 40.646 seconds and a speed of 177.139 mph (285.078 km/h).

Pos	No.	Driver	Team	Manufacturer	Time	Speed
1	9	Noah Gragson	JR Motorsports	Chevrolet	40.646	177.139
2	22	Austin Cindric	Team Penske	Ford	40.904	176.022
3	8	Daniel Hemric	JR Motorsports	Chevrolet	41.049	175.400
Official first practice results

=== Final practice ===
Harrison Burton was the fastest in the final practice session with a time of 41.267 seconds and a speed of 174.474 mph (280.789 km/h).

Pos	No.	Driver	Team	Manufacturer	Time	Speed
1	20	Harrison Burton	Joe Gibbs Racing	Toyota	41.267	174.474
2	9	Noah Gragson	JR Motorsports	Chevrolet	41.432	173.779
3	22	Austin Cindric	Team Penske	Ford	41.433	173.775
Official final practice results

== Qualifying ==
Brandon Jones scored the pole position after a time of 39.948 seconds and a speed of 180.234 mph (290.059 km/h).

=== Qualifying results ===
Pos	No	Driver	Team	Manufacturer	Time
1	19	Brandon Jones	Joe Gibbs Racing	Toyota	39.948
2	20	Harrison Burton (R)	Joe Gibbs Racing	Toyota	40.079
3	98	Chase Briscoe	Stewart-Haas Racing	Ford	40.137
4	8	Daniel Hemric	JR Motorsports	Chevrolet	40.230
5	18	Riley Herbst (R)	Joe Gibbs Racing	Toyota	40.242
6	10	Ross Chastain	Kaulig Racing	Chevrolet	40.248
7	22	Austin Cindric	Team Penske	Ford	40.314
8	39	Ryan Sieg	RSS Racing	Chevrolet	40.441
9	11	Justin Haley	Kaulig Racing	Chevrolet	40.578
10	7	Justin Allgaier	JR Motorsports	Chevrolet	40.597
11	51	Jeremy Clements	Jeremy Clements Racing	Chevrolet	40.598
12	9	Noah Gragson	JR Motorsports	Chevrolet	40.667
13	21	Anthony Alfredo	Richard Childress Racing	Chevrolet	40.692
14	1	Michael Annett	JR Motorsports	Chevrolet	40.780
15	61	Austin Hill (i)	Hattori Racing	Toyota	40.920
16	4	Jesse Little (R)	JD Motorsports	Chevrolet	41.297
17	90	Alex Labbé	DGM Racing	Chevrolet	41.395
18	47	Bayley Currey (i)	Mike Harmon Racing	Chevrolet	41.405
19	93	Myatt Snider	RSS Racing	Chevrolet	41.451
20	07	Ray Black Jr.	SS-Green Light Racing	Chevrolet	41.521
21	68	Brandon Brown	Brandonbilt Motorsports	Chevrolet	41.636
22	08	Joe Graf Jr. (R)	SS-Green Light Racing	Chevrolet	41.650
23	52	J. J. Yeley	Means Racing	Chevrolet	41.675
24	89	Landon Cassill	Shepherd Racing	Chevrolet	41.711
25	92	Josh Williams	DGM Racing	Chevrolet	41.765
26	0	B. J. McLeod	JD Motorsports	Chevrolet	41.891
27	13	Chad Finchum	MBM Motorsports	Toyota	41.972
28	74	Kyle Weatherman	Mike Harmon Racing	Chevrolet	42.071
29	02	Brett Moffitt (i)	Our Motorsports	Chevrolet	42.086
30	6	David Starr	JD Motorsports	Chevrolet	42.158
31	44	Tommy Joe Martins	Martins Motorsports	Chevrolet	42.200
32	5	Matt Mills	B. J. McLeod Motorsports	Chevrolet	42.294
33	66	Stephen Leicht	MBM Motorsports	Toyota	43.103
34	99	Josh Bilicki	B. J. McLeod Motorsports	Toyota	43.333
35	15	Robby Lyons	JD Motorsports	Chevrolet	43.916
36	78	Vinnie Miller	B. J. McLeod Motorsports	Chevrolet	44.090
Official qualifying results

- Chad Finchum, Bayley Currey, and Josh Bilicki started from the rear due to unapproved adjustments.
- Tommy Joe Martins started from the rear due to an engine change.

== Race ==
=== Race results ===
==== Stage Results ====
Stage One Laps: 35

Pos	No	Driver	Team	Manufacturer	Points
1	19	Brandon Jones	Joe Gibbs Racing	Toyota	10
2	98	Chase Briscoe	Stewart-Haas Racing	Ford	9
3	20	Harrison Burton (R)	Joe Gibbs Racing	Toyota	8
4	10	Ross Chastain	Kaulig Racing	Chevrolet	7
5	8	Daniel Hemric	JR Motorsports	Chevrolet	6
6	18	Riley Herbst (R)	Joe Gibbs Racing	Toyota	5
7	39	Ryan Sieg	RSS Racing	Chevrolet	4
8	22	Austin Cindric	Team Penske	Ford	3
9	9	Noah Gragson	JR Motorsports	Toyota	2
10	1	Michael Annett	JR Motorsports	Chevrolet	1

Stage Two Laps: 35

Pos	No	Driver	Team	Manufacturer	Points
1	19	Brandon Jones	Joe Gibbs Racing	Toyota	10
2	8	Daniel Hemric	JR Motorsports	Chevrolet	9
3	20	Harrison Burton (R)	Joe Gibbs Racing	Toyota	8
4	98	Chase Briscoe	Stewart-Haas Racing	Ford	7
5	22	Austin Cindric	Team Penske	Ford	6
6	18	Riley Herbst (R)	Joe Gibbs Racing	Toyota	5
7	10	Ross Chastain	Kaulig Racing	Chevrolet	4
8	7	Justin Allgaier	JR Motorsports	Chevrolet	3
9	39	Ryan Sieg	RSS Racing	Chevrolet	2
10	1	Michael Annett	JR Motorsports	Chevrolet	1

=== Final Stage Results ===
Laps: 80

Pos	Grid	No	Driver	Team	Manufacturer	Laps	Points	Status
1	2	20	Harrison Burton (R)	Joe Gibbs Racing	Toyota	150	56	Running
2	5	18	Riley Herbst (R)	Joe Gibbs Racing	Toyota	150	45	Running
3	7	22	Austin Cindric	Team Penske	Ford	150	43	Running
4	8	39	Ryan Sieg	RSS Racing	Chevrolet	150	39	Running
5	9	11	Justin Haley	Kaulig Racing	Chevrolet	150	32	Running
6	13	21	Anthony Alfredo	Richard Childress Racing	Chevrolet	150	31	Running
7	4	8	Daniel Hemric	JR Motorsports	Chevrolet	150	45	Running
8	6	10	Ross Chastain	Kaulig Racing	Chevrolet	150	40	Running
9	11	51	Jeremy Clements	Jeremy Clements Racing	Chevrolet	150	28	Running
10	25	92	Josh Williams	DGM Racing	Chevrolet	150	27	Running
11	19	93	Myatt Snider	RSS Racing	Chevrolet	150	26	Running
12	10	7	Justin Allgaier	JR Motorsports	Chevrolet	150	28	Running
13	17	90	Alex Labbé	DGM Racing	Chevrolet	150	24	Running
14	29	02	Brett Moffitt (i)	Our Motorsports	Chevrolet	150	0	Running
15	36	78	Vinnie Miller	B. J. McLeod Motorsports	Chevrolet	150	22	Running
16	15	61	Austin Hill (i)	Hattori Racing	Toyota	149	0	Running
17	14	1	Michael Annett	JR Motorsports	Chevrolet	149	22	Running
18	31	44	Tommy Joe Martins	Martins Motorsports	Chevrolet	149	19	Running
19	3	98	Chase Briscoe	Stewart-Haas Racing	Ford	148	34	Running
20	27	13	Chad Finchum	MBM Motorsports	Toyota	148	17	Running
21	30	6	David Starr	JD Motorsports	Chevrolet	148	16	Running
22	20	07	Ray Black Jr.	SS-Green Light Racing	Chevrolet	148	15	Running
23	35	15	Robby Lyons	JD Motorsports	Chevrolet	147	14	Running
24	26	0	B. J. McLeod	JD Motorsports	Chevrolet	147	13	Running
25	23	52	J. J. Yeley	Means Racing	Chevrolet	147	12	Running
26	12	9	Noah Gragson	JR Motorsports	Chevrolet	147	13	Running
27	32	5	Matt Mills	B. J. McLeod Motorsports	Chevrolet	146	10	Running
28	16	4	Jesse Little (R)	JD Motorsports	Chevrolet	146	9	Running
29	34	99	Josh Bilicki	B. J. McLeod Motorsports	Toyota	146	8	Running
30	1	19	Brandon Jones	Joe Gibbs Racing	Toyota	146	27	Running
31	22	08	Joe Graf Jr. (R)	SS-Green Light Racing	Chevrolet	143	6	Running
32	18	47	Bayley Currey (i)	Mike Harmon Racing	Chevrolet	120	0	Running
33	21	68	Brandon Brown	Brandonbilt Motorsports	Chevrolet	115	4	Engine
34	28	74	Kyle Weatherman	Mike Harmon Racing	Chevrolet	97	3	Engine
35	33	66	Stephen Leicht	MBM Motorsports	Toyota	78	2	Fuel Pump
36	24	89	Landon Cassill	Shepherd Racing	Chevrolet	38	1	Fuel Pressure
Official race results

=== Race statistics ===
- Lead changes: 13 among 8 different drivers
- Cautions/Laps: 8 for 36
- Red flags: 0
- Time of race: 2 hours, 28 minutes, 15 seconds
- Average speed: 121.417 mph (195.402 km/h)

== Media ==
=== Television ===
The Production Alliance 300 was carried by FS1 in the United States. Adam Alexander, Team Penske driver Joey Logano, and Hendrick Motorsports crew chief Chad Knaus called the race from the booth, with Matt Yocum and Regan Smith covering pit road.

FS1
Booth announcers	Pit reporters
Lap-by-lap: Adam Alexander Color-commentator: Joey Logano Color-commentator: Chad Knaus	Matt Yocum Regan Smith

=== Radio ===
The Motor Racing Network (MRN) called the race for radio, which was simulcast on SiriusXM NASCAR Radio. Dan Hubbard and Steve Post anchored the action from the booth. Kyle Rickey called the action from Turns 1 & 2 and Alex Hayden called the race through turns 3 & 4. Dillon Welch and Kim Coon provided reports from pit road.

MRN Radio
Booth announcers	Turn announcers	Pit reporters
Lead announcer: Dan Hubbard Announcer: Steve Post	Turns 1 & 2: Kyle Rickey Turns 3 & 4: Alex Hayden	Dillon Welch Kim Coon

== Standings after the race ==
Drivers' Championship standings

	Pos	Driver	Points
2	1	Harrison Burton (R)	136
1	2	Chase Briscoe	126 (-10)
3	3	Austin Cindric	118 (-18)
3	4	Ryan Sieg	112 (-24)
3	5	Justin Haley	105 (-31)
1	6	Brandon Jones	103 (-33)
4	7	Ross Chastain	100 (-36)
4	8	Michael Annett	99 (-37)
7	9	Noah Gragson	98 (-38)
1	10	Justin Allgaier	98 (-38)
5	11	Riley Herbst (R)	82 (-54)
1	12	Alex Labbé	72 (-64)
Official driver's standings

Note: Only the first 12 positions are included for the driver standings.

Previous race: 2020 Boyd Gaming 300	NASCAR Xfinity Series; 2020 season	Next race: 2020 LS Tractor 200
