= Robby Lyons =

American racing driver

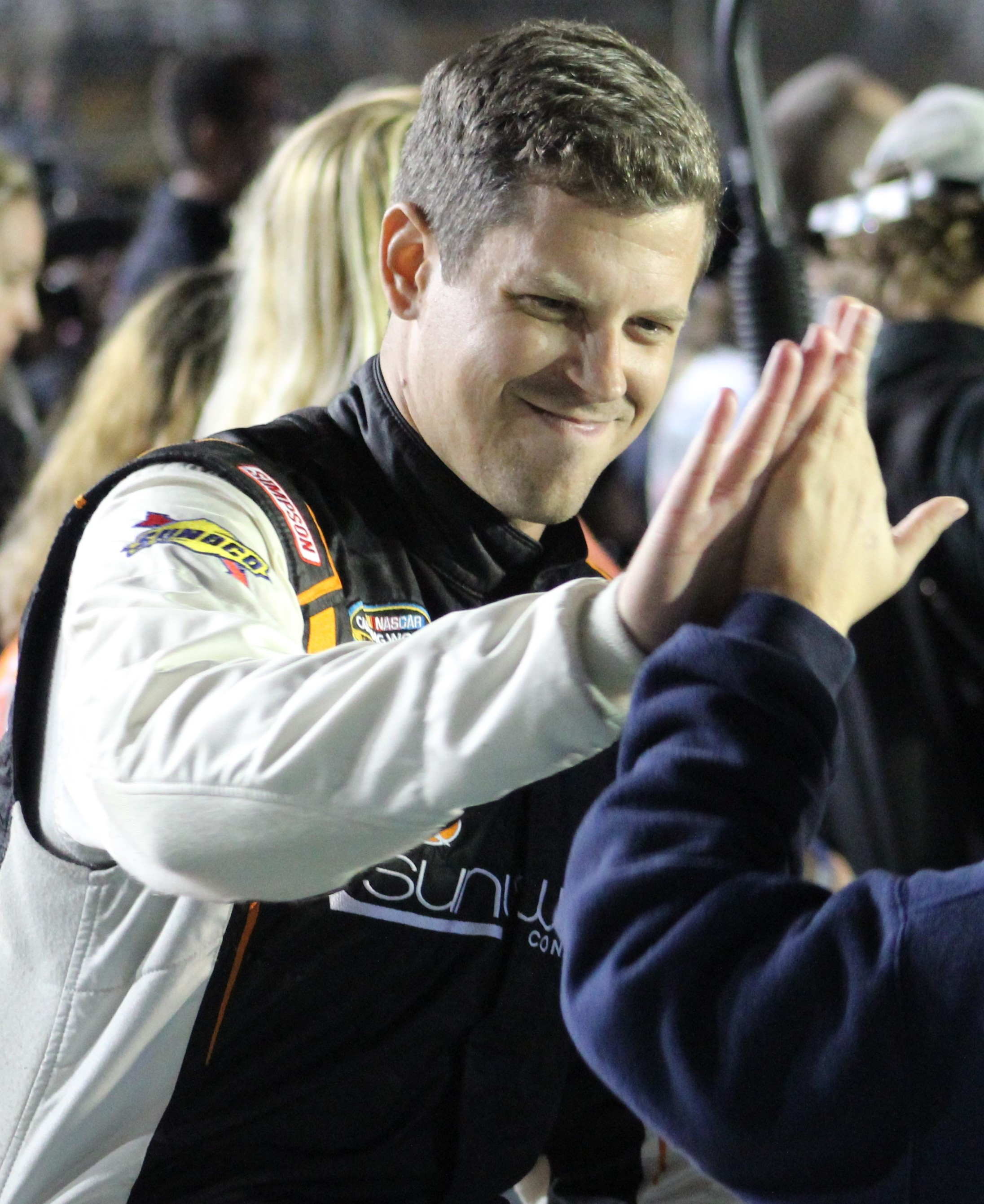
- Lyons at Homestead–Miami Speedway in 2018
- Born: Robert Lyons II; January 22, 1989 (age 37); Clearwater, Florida, U.S.

NASCAR O'Reilly Auto Parts Series career
- 6 races run over 3 years
- 2021 position: 67th
- Best finish: 47th (2020)
- First race: 2019 Ford EcoBoost 300 (Homestead)
- Last race: 2021 Beef. It's What's for Dinner. 300 (Daytona)
Wins	Top tens	Poles
0	0	0

NASCAR FedEx Freight Truck Series career
- 17 races run over 4 years
- 2020 position: 89th
- Best finish: 32nd (2018)
- First race: 2017 Lucas Oil 150 (Phoenix)
- Last race: 2020 Lucas Oil 150 (Phoenix)
Wins	Top tens	Poles
0	0	0
- Statistics up to date as of December 27, 2021.

Robert Lyons II (born January 22, 1989) is an American professional stock car racing driver. He last competed part-time in the ARCA Menards Series, driving the No. 42 Chevrolet SS for Cook Racing Technologies. He has also competed part-time NASCAR Xfinity Series and in the NASCAR Camping World Truck Series in the past.

== Racing career ==
=== Early career ===
Lyons started his racing career at the age of six, racing dirt bikes. Lyons raced dirt bikes for over a decade, winning two Florida championships. After injuring both legs in a crash when he was fifteen, Lyons quit bike racing at eighteen. He then moved to Legends car racing after seeing former motocross racer Ricky Carmichael transition. After Legends cars, Lyons competed in the Pro All-Stars Series in 2014. In December 2014, Lyons tested at Daytona International Speedway in an ARCA Racing Series car that was prepared by both Rick Ware Racing and MacDonald Motorsports. In early 2015, Lyons joined Chad Finley and his team as a development driver to compete in the 2015 CARS Tour; Lyons wound up only running three of the races. Lyons made a return to the CARS Tour in 2017 and also competed in the Short Track Nationals at Bristol Motor Speedway.

=== NASCAR ===
Lyons announced on November 9, 2017 that he would be making his NASCAR debut in the Camping World Truck Series, driving for Premium Motorsports at Phoenix International Raceway. His effort was led by former NASCAR driver Brian Keselowski as crew chief. The pairing came together after Lyons and Premium owner Jay Robinson met at Charlotte Motor Speedway in fall 2017. After accidents eliminated the majority of the field, Lyons finished 12th in his Truck debut. In his debut, Lyons was almost wrecked by teammate Jason Hathaway near the end of the race but survived. During the week after the Phoenix race, Lyons was approved for all of NASCAR's 1.5-mile tracks, leading to a second race with Premium a week later for the Truck season finale at Homestead-Miami Speedway, where he finished 24th.

On January 23, 2018, it was announced that Lyons would drive Premium's No. 15 truck full-time in 2018. However, Lyons was replaced by Reed Sorenson for Dover race due to sponsorship. He was scheduled to race in Texas before being pulled for Sorenson for health issues. Following medical tests in June, Lyons revealed he was suffering from neurological issues affecting his heart rate and blood pressure, forcing him out of competing in the month's races. Later on, after listening to Dale Earnhardt Jr.'s story about concussions, Lyons got treatment after recognizing symptoms and got treatment for concussions. Eventually, Lyons and Premium split and in summer 2018, Lyons purchased his trucks, which debuted at Talladega Superspeedway with the No. 33, owner points coming from Reaume Brothers Racing. The Talladega truck was purchased from Josh Reaume, while Lyons also acquired a couple of old Brad Keselowski Racing chassis.

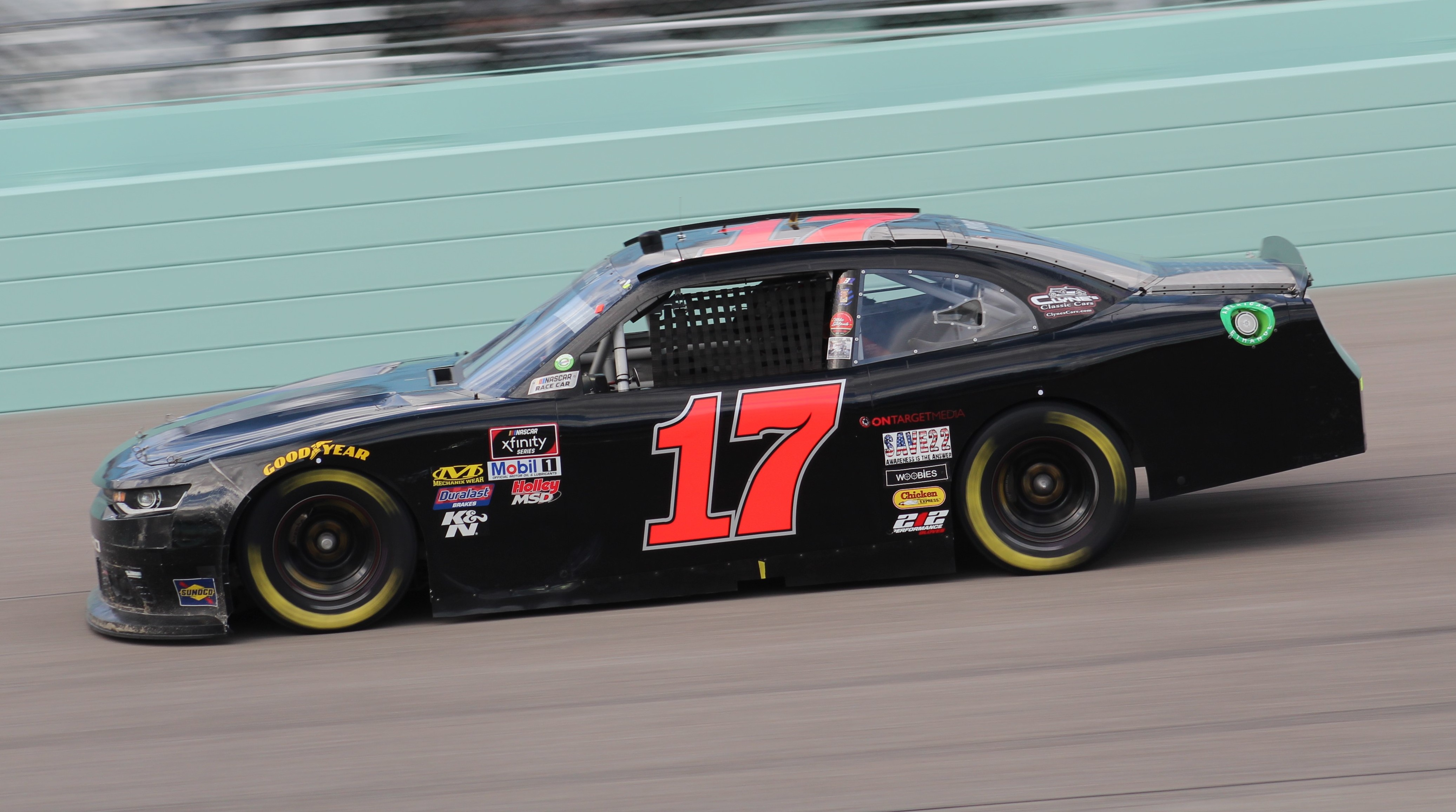
Lyon's No. 17 car at Homestead-Miami Speedway in 2019

Lyons during Xfinity Series practice at Daytona International Speedway in 2020.

In 2019, Lyons joined Chad Finley Racing for a part-time schedule in the No. 42 Silverado, sharing the truck with owner Chad Finley. At the end of the season, he made his NASCAR Xfinity Series debut in the Ford EcoBoost 300 at Homestead–Miami Speedway with Rick Ware Racing.

Lyons joined JD Motorsports for the first three Xfinity races in 2020. He also raced at Talladega. He returned to the Truck Series in June at Pocono Raceway, driving for Diversified Motorsports Enterprises.

In 2021, Lyons returned to the Xfinity Series, joining MBM Motorsports to drive their No. 61 Toyota for the season-opener at Daytona as well as the possibility of additional races later in the year.

== Personal life ==
Lyons grew up in Clearwater, Florida. He soon took after his dad Bob Lyons who was a well known drag racer and became a dirt bike racer until the age of 18. After moving to stock car racing, Lyons became good friends with Xfinity Series driver Garrett Smithley. Lyons is also a user of the online racing simulator iRacing. He graduated from Indian Rocks Christian School.

== Motorsports career results ==
=== NASCAR ===
(key) (Bold – Pole position awarded by qualifying time. Italics – Pole position earned by points standings or practice time. * – Most laps led.)

==== Xfinity Series ====
NASCAR Xfinity Series results
Year	Team	No.	Make	1	2	3	4	5	6	7	8	9	10	11	12	13	14	15	16	17	18	19	20	21	22	23	24	25	26	27	28	29	30	31	32	33	NXSC	Pts	Ref
2019	Rick Ware Racing	17	Chevy	DAY	ATL	LVS	PHO	CAL	TEX	BRI	RCH	TAL	DOV	CLT	POC	MCH	IOW	CHI	DAY	KEN	NHA	IOW	GLN	MOH	BRI	ROA	DAR	IND	LVS	RCH	CLT	DOV	KAN	TEX	PHO	HOM; 28	101st	0^{1}	
2020	JD Motorsports	15	Chevy	DAY; 17	LVS; 23	CAL; 23	PHO	DAR	CLT	BRI	ATL	HOM	HOM	TAL; 19	POC	IND	KEN	KEN	TEX	KAN	ROA	DAY	DOV	DOV	DAY	DAR	RCH	RCH	BRI	LVS	TAL	CLT	KAN	TEX	MAR	PHO	47th	66	
2021	MBM Motorsports	61	Toyota	DAY; 25	DAY	HOM	LVS	PHO	ATL	MAR	TAL	DAR	DOV	COA	CLT	MOH	TEX	NSH	POC	ROA	ATL	NHA	GLN	IND	MCH	DAY	DAR	RCH	BRI	LVS	TAL	CLT	TEX	KAN	MAR	PHO	67th	12	

==== Gander RV & Outdoors Truck Series ====
NASCAR Gander RV & Outdoors Truck Series results
Year	Team	No.	Make	1	2	3	4	5	6	7	8	9	10	11	12	13	14	15	16	17	18	19	20	21	22	23	NGTC	Pts	Ref
2017	Premium Motorsports	49	Chevy	DAY	ATL	MAR	KAN	CLT	DOV	TEX	GTW	IOW	KEN	ELD	POC	MCH	BRI	MSP	CHI	NHA	LVS	TAL	MAR	TEX	PHO; 12	HOM; 24	85th	0^{1}	
2018	Premium Motorsports	15	Chevy	DAY; 13	ATL; 25	LVS; 18	MAR; 24	DOV	KAN; 26	CLT; 23	TEX	IOW	GTW	CHI	KEN; 22	ELD	POC	MCH	BRI	MSP	LVS						32nd	140	
2018	Reaume Brothers Racing	33	Chevy																			TAL; 14	MAR	TEX	PHO	HOM; 27	32nd	140	
2019	Chad Finley Racing	42	Chevy	DAY; 30	ATL	LVS	MAR	TEX	DOV	KAN	CLT	TEX	IOW	GTW	CHI	KEN	POC	ELD	MCH	BRI	MSP	LVS	TAL	MAR	PHO	HOM	92nd	7	
2020	Diversified Motorsports Enterprises	97	Chevy	DAY	LVS	CLT	ATL	HOM	POC; 20	KEN	TEX	KAN; 26	KAN; 21	MCH	DAY	DOV	GTW	DAR	RCH	BRI	LVS	TAL; 26	KAN	TEX	MAR	PHO; 29	89th	0^{1}	

=== ARCA Menards Series ===
(key) (Bold – Pole position awarded by qualifying time. Italics – Pole position earned by points standings or practice time. * – Most laps led. ** – All laps led.)

ARCA Menards Series results
Year	Team	No.	Make	1	2	3	4	5	6	7	8	9	10	11	12	13	14	15	16	17	18	19	20	AMSC	Pts	Ref
2023	Cook Racing Technologies	42	Chevy	DAY; 17	PHO	TAL	KAN	CLT	BLN	ELK	MOH	IOW	POC	MCH	IRP	GLN	ISF	MLW	DSF	KAN	BRI	SLM	TOL	99th	27	

=== CARS Super Late Model Tour ===
(key)

CARS Super Late Model Tour results
Year	Team	No.	Make	1	2	3	4	5	6	7	8	9	10	11	12	13	CSLMTC	Pts	Ref
2015	Chad Finley	2L	Chevy	SNM; 26	ROU; 30	HCY; 29	SNM	TCM	MMS	ROU	CON	MYB	HCY				57th	14	
2017	N/A	2L	Chevy	CON	DOM	DOM	HCY	HCY	BRI; 18	AND	ROU	TCM	ROU	HCY	CON	SBO	N/A	0	

^{*} Season still in progress
^{1} Ineligible for series points
