= Brandon Brown (racing driver) =

American racing driver (born 1993)

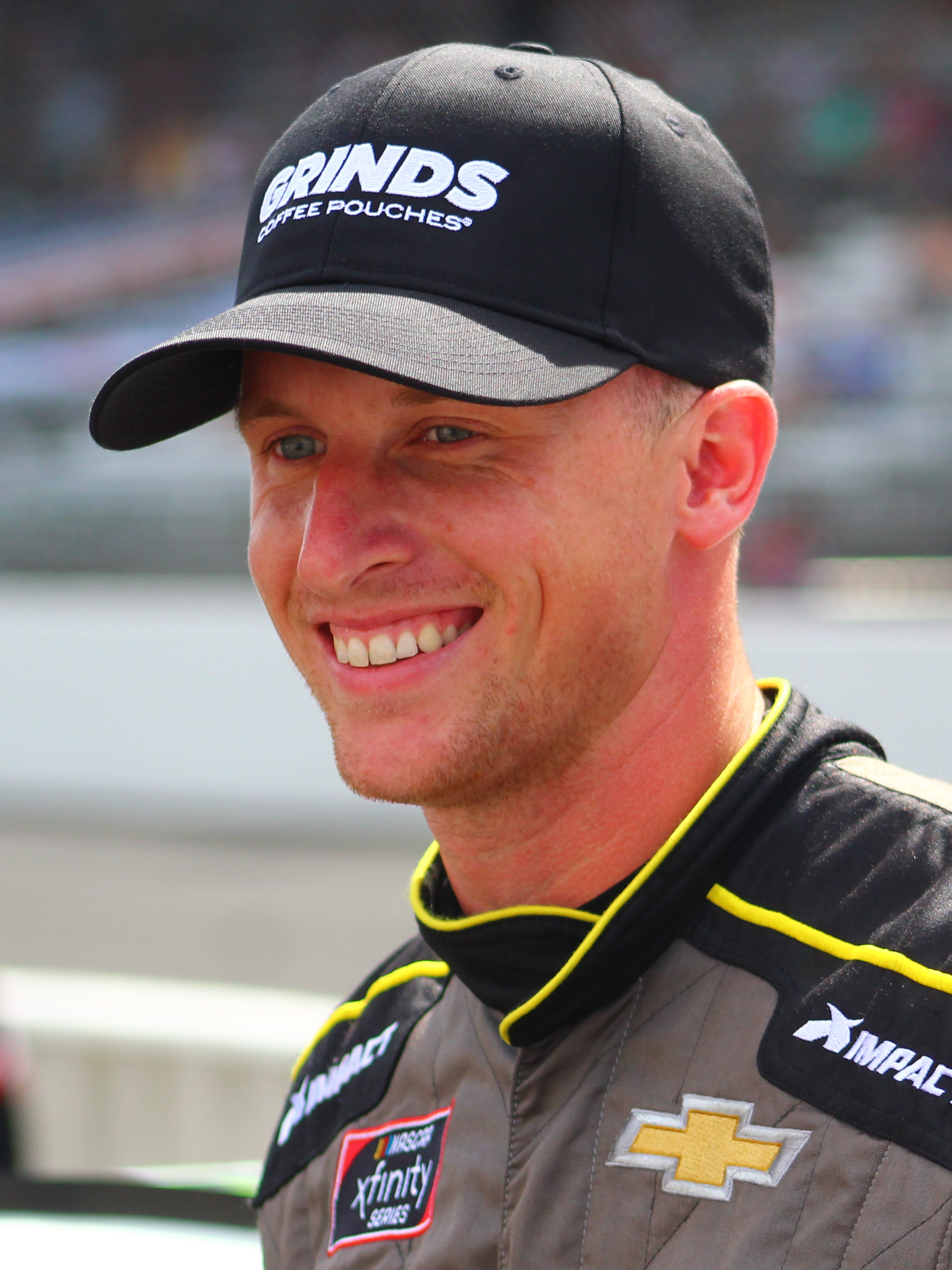
- Brown at Indianapolis Motor Speedway in 2021
- Born: Brandon Lee Brown; September 14, 1993 (age 33); Woodbridge, Virginia, U.S.

NASCAR O'Reilly Auto Parts Series career
- 150 races run over 7 years
- 2022 position: 17th
- Best finish: 11th (2020)
- First race: 2016 Virginia 529 College Savings 250 (Richmond)
- Last race: 2022 NASCAR Xfinity Series Championship Race (Phoenix)
- First win: 2021 Sparks 300 (Talladega)
| Wins | Top tens | Poles |
|---|---|---|
| 1 | 20 | 0 |

NASCAR FedEx Freight Truck Series career
- 22 races run over 4 years
- 2017 position: 97th
- Best finish: 25th (2016)
- First race: 2014 American Ethanol 200 (Iowa)
- Last race: 2017 Alpha Energy Solutions 250 (Martinsville)
| Wins | Top tens | Poles |
|---|---|---|
| 0 | 1 | 0 |
- Statistics up to date as of November 5, 2022.

Brandon Lee Brown (born September 14, 1993) is an American former professional stock car racing driver. He last competed full-time in the NASCAR Xfinity Series, driving for several teams including the No. 68 Chevrolet Camaro for Brandonbilt Motorsports.

Brown inadvertently became associated with politics after winning the 2021 Sparks 300, when NBC Sports reporter Kelli Stavast's misstating of a crowd chant led to "Let's Go Brandon" becoming a political slogan used against former U.S. President Joe Biden.

== Racing career ==
=== Early career ===
Brown first started racing when he was ten, driving go-karts at King George Speedway before moving to dirt track racing, winning the 2006 World Karting Association Mid-South Region Jr. championship. Two years later, he won the Jr. Restricted Light and Heavy Division championships, followed by the VDKA Series and Jr. Restricted Light and Heavy Division championships in 2009. In 2010, Brown began competing in the Whelen All-American Series with family-owned Brandonbilt Motorsports, winning a race and eventually the Virginia Rookie of the Year Award. The next year, he won three races at Old Dominion Speedway.

=== NASCAR ===
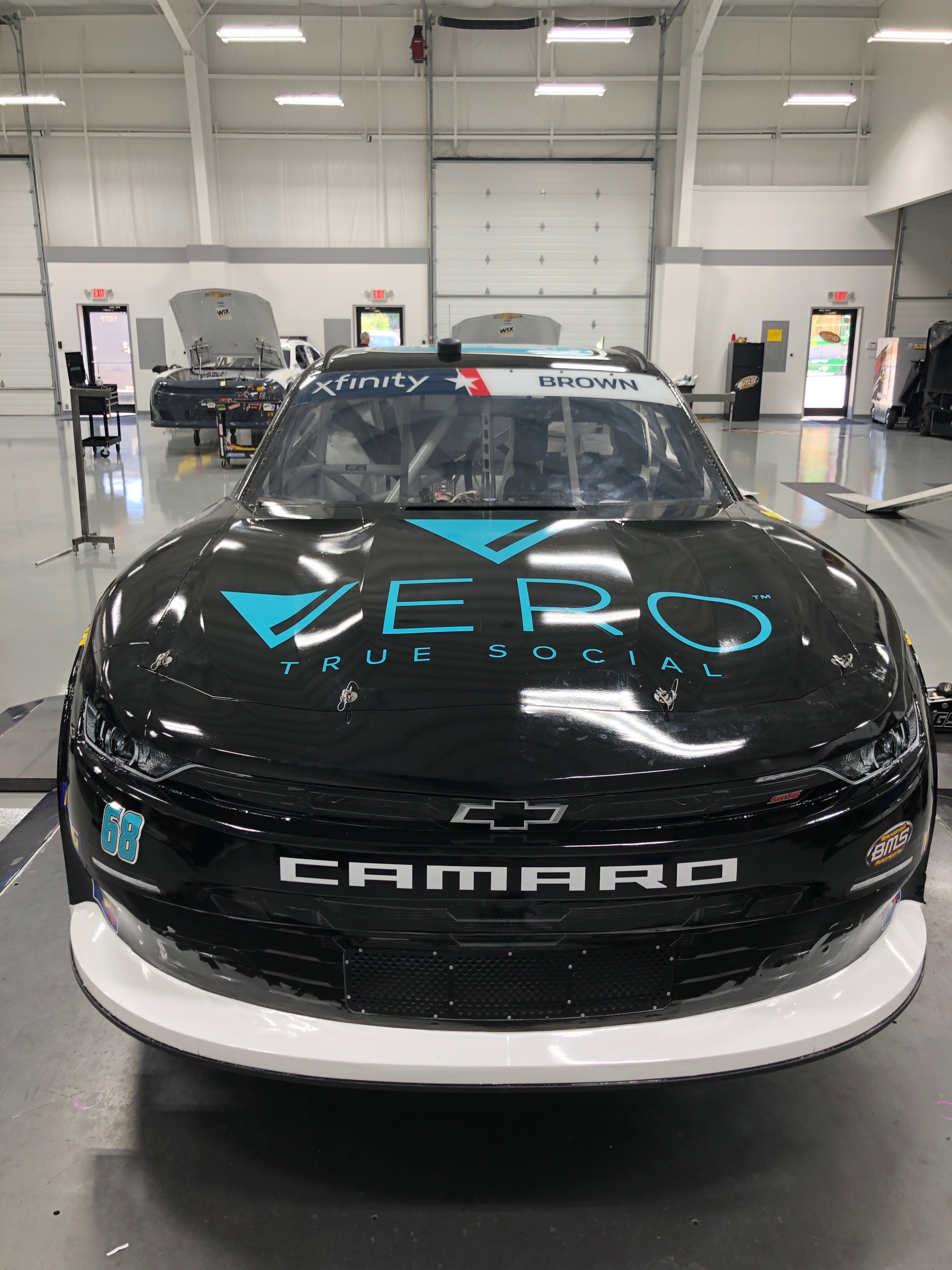
Brown's No. 68 Xfinity car in 2019

In 2014, Brown made his Camping World Truck Series debut at Iowa Speedway, finishing 25th after starting 27th. He made two more starts in the year, with a best finish of 19th at New Hampshire Motor Speedway.

The following year, Brown attempted eight races but failed to qualify for three. After starting the season with a 29th-place finish at Atlanta Motor Speedway, he ended the year with a best finish of 14th at Dover International Speedway.

In the 2016 season opener at Daytona International Speedway, Brown finished a career-best fourth place. Brown made his Xfinity Series debut at his home track of Richmond International Raceway in September 2016. Brown increased his Xfinity Series schedule in 2017, with intentions of running ten races in addition to select Truck races.

After driving a full-time Xfinity Series schedule in 2019 for 2 teams, Brown drove the No. 68 Chevrolet for Brandonbilt Motorsports the following year. He made his first appearance in the NASCAR Xfinity Series playoffs, finishing 12th in the regular-season standings, but was eliminated following the first round.

In 2021, Brown tied his best career finish with a sixth at Daytona, followed by an eighth-place finish at the Daytona Road Course. He improved on his best finish at Phoenix when he finished third after various leaders were forced into the wall on an overtime restart.

At the Sparks 300 at Talladega in October 2021, Brown was in contention throughout the latter part of the race after escaping the first big wreck that took place on lap 88. As the race started late in the day because of the Truck race that was completed just earlier, there was a chance that the race would be called early if another caution had come out as it was starting to get dark. With a push from behind, Brown, who was not in the playoffs, was able to narrowly get ahead of Brandon Jones and Justin Allgaier in time when the final caution of the race came out with 13 to go due to another big crash. The race was ultimately called with five laps to go due to darkness, and Brown would score his first career Xfinity Series win in his 114th start.

=== Sponsorships ===
Coastal Carolina University, Brown’s alma mater, served as a primary sponsor on Brown's truck and Xfinity car during the early part of his career.

When his team was struggling to find sponsorship during the 2021 season, Brown made a Twitter video in June 2021, dressing up as a 'used car salesman' in an attempt to promote his team and find available sponsors for upcoming races. The video paid off as Brandonbilt Motorsports announced they had secured enough sponsorship, including one from American PetroLog, a provider of logistics services for the petrochemical industry, as well as cryptocurrency company TradeTheChain.com, to finish off the rest of the season.

== "Let's Go Brandon" ==
After his first win at Talladega, Brown was being interviewed at the start-finish line by NBC Sports reporter Kelli Stavast, when many in the crowd began to chant "Fuck Joe Biden." Stavast stated, "You can hear the chants from the crowd, 'Let's go, Brandon!'" It is unclear whether she legitimately misheard the chant or whether she intentionally misquoted it.

This gave rise to the political slogan "Let's Go Brandon" as a euphemism against Biden. Brown initially responded to the new political slogan with the lighthearted tweet, "To all the other Brandons out there, You're welcome! Let's go us". However, he was privately ambivalent about the phrase because it overshadowed his Talladega win and threatened to scare off corporate sponsors, who were leery of controversy. His plan originally was to simply ignore the phrase, but as several months passed and it remained in widespread use, he worried that his silence was perceived as a tacit endorsement of the sentiment. Later that month, the Associated Press reported that Brown's Brandonbilt Motorsports team, which was family owned, was struggling to acquire sponsorship since companies were hesitant to support him due to his indirect association with the chant and its political undertones.

In December 2021, he broke his silence on the matter in an interview with The New York Times in which he stated that, though he was a Republican, he wanted "to appeal to everybody" and had "zero desire to be involved in politics". Brown expressed his wishes for the slogan to instead be used in a positive context. He also published an op-ed in Newsweek, in which he took a more mixed stance, stating that he was "not going to endorse anyone", but that he was "not going to hesitate to speak about issues I am passionate about, or the problems we face together as Americans".

On December 30, 2021, Brown announced meme coin Let's Go Brandon Coin (LGBCoin) would become his primary sponsor for the full 2022 season. However, the sponsorship was rejected by NASCAR, who added that it had not been approved at the time of Brown's announcement. Brandonbilt Motorsports and LGBCoin's investors disputed NASCAR's statement, citing communications between the team and NASCAR officials, while LGBCoin manager James Koutoulas threatened legal action. Brown eventually signed a two-year personal endorsement deal with LGBCoin. Koutoalas filed a lawsuit against NASCAR in 2025, though a jury ruled in NASCAR's favor.

Following the 2024 United States presidential election, Brown tweeted, "So I guess after today the phrase dies and y'all can sponsor me again, thanks!!!" He has not raced in NASCAR since 2022.

== Personal life ==
Brown graduated from Coastal Carolina University in 2018 with a degree in communication; he was also a member of the Sigma Phi Epsilon fraternity. The school served as a primary sponsor on Brown's truck and Xfinity car during the early part of his career.

Brown's father and team owner, Jerry, underwent "aggressive" treatment for cancer after being diagnosed during a routine check-up on April 7, 2020. Brown revealed that his father was cancer-free on August 26.

== Motorsports career results ==
=== Racing career summary ===
| Season | Series | Team | Races | Wins | Top 5 | Top 10 | Points | Position |
|---|---|---|---|---|---|---|---|---|
| 2014 | NASCAR Camping World Truck Series | Brandonbilt Motorsports | 3 | 0 | 0 | 0 | 64 | 46th |
| 2015 | NASCAR Camping World Truck Series | Brandonbilt Motorsports | 5 | 0 | 0 | 0 | 93 | 39th |
| 2016 | NASCAR Camping World Truck Series | MAKE Motorsports | 12 | 0 | 1 | 1 | 153 | 25th |
| 2016 | NASCAR Camping World Truck Series | Brandonbilt Motorsports | 1 | 0 | 0 | 0 | 153 | 25th |
| 2016 | NASCAR Xfinity Series | Brandonbilt Motorsports | 3 | 0 | 0 | 0 | 0 | NC† |
| 2017 | NASCAR Camping World Truck Series | Martins Motorsports | 1 | 0 | 0 | 0 | 0 | NC† |
| 2017 | NASCAR Xfinity Series | Brandonbilt Motorsports | 10 | 0 | 0 | 0 | 110 | 36th |
| 2018 | NASCAR Xfinity Series | Brandonbilt Motorsports | 7 | 0 | 0 | 0 | 94 | 42nd |
| 2019 | NASCAR Xfinity Series | Brandonbilt Motorsports | 32 | 0 | 0 | 1 | 574 | 15th |
| 2019 | NASCAR Xfinity Series | RSS Racing | 1 | 0 | 0 | 0 | 574 | 15th |
| 2020 | NASCAR Xfinity Series | Brandonbilt Motorsports | 33 | 0 | 1 | 6 | 2170 | 11th |
| 2021 | NASCAR Xfinity Series | Brandonbilt Motorsports | 33 | 1 | 3 | 9 | 620 | 16th |
| 2022 | NASCAR Xfinity Series | Brandonbilt Motorsports | 23 | 0 | 2 | 4 | 538 | 17th |
| 2022 | NASCAR Xfinity Series | Mike Harmon Racing | 1 | 0 | 0 | 0 | 538 | 17th |
| 2022 | NASCAR Xfinity Series | B. J. McLeod Motorsports | 4 | 0 | 0 | 0 | 538 | 17th |
| 2022 | NASCAR Xfinity Series | Our Motorsports | 1 | 0 | 0 | 0 | 538 | 17th |
| 2022 | NASCAR Xfinity Series | SS-Green Light Racing | 2 | 0 | 0 | 0 | 538 | 17th |

^{†} As Brown was a guest driver, he was ineligible for championship points.

=== NASCAR ===
(key) (Bold – Pole position awarded by qualifying time. Italics – Pole position earned by points standings or practice time. * – Most laps led.)

==== Xfinity Series ====
NASCAR Xfinity Series results
| Year | Team | No. | Make | 1 | 2 | 3 | 4 | 5 | 6 | 7 | 8 | 9 | 10 | 11 | 12 | 13 | 14 | 15 | 16 | 17 | 18 | 19 | 20 | 21 | 22 | 23 | 24 | 25 | 26 | 27 | 28 | 29 | 30 | 31 | 32 | 33 | NXSC | Pts | Ref |
|---|---|---|---|---|---|---|---|---|---|---|---|---|---|---|---|---|---|---|---|---|---|---|---|---|---|---|---|---|---|---|---|---|---|---|---|---|---|---|---|
| 2016 | Brandonbilt Motorsports | 86 | Chevy | DAY | ATL | LVS | PHO | CAL | TEX | BRI | RCH | TAL | DOV | CLT | POC | MCH | IOW | DAY | KEN | NHA | IND | IOW | GLN | MOH | BRI | ROA | DAR | RCH; 29 | CHI | KEN | DOV | CLT | KAN; 25 | TEX | PHO | HOM; 23 | 117th | 0^{1} | |
| 2017 | Brandonbilt Motorsports | 90 | Chevy | DAY | ATL; 23 | LVS | PHO | CAL | TEX | BRI | RCH; 25 | TAL | CLT | DOV; 17 | POC | MCH; 33 | IOW | DAY; 37 | KEN; DNQ | NHA | IND | IOW; 29 | GLN | MOH | BRI; 25 | ROA | DAR; 20 | RCH; 27 | CHI | KEN | DOV; 25 | CLT | KAN | TEX | PHO | HOM | 36th | 110 | |
| 2018 | Brandonbilt Motorsports | 86 | Chevy | DAY; 36 | ATL | LVS | PHO | CAL | TEX | BRI | | | | | | | | | | | | | | | | | | | | | | | | | | HOM; 24 | 42nd | 94 | |
| 2018 | Brandonbilt Motorsports | 90 | Chevy | | | | | | | | RCH; 19 | TAL | DOV; 28 | CLT | POC | MCH | IOW | CHI | DAY | KEN | NHA | IOW | GLN | MOH | BRI | ROA | DAR; 18 | IND | LVS | RCH | ROV | DOV; 22 | KAN | TEX; 18 | PHO | | 42nd | 94 | |
| 2019 | Brandonbilt Motorsports | 86 | Chevy | DAY; 18 | ATL; 13 | LVS; 17 | PHO; 15 | CAL; 15 | TEX; 17 | BRI; 23 | | TAL; 15 | DOV; 13 | | POC; 13 | MCH; 26 | IOW; 31 | CHI; 22 | DAY; 6 | KEN; 17 | NHA; 16 | IOW; 27 | GLN; 18 | | BRI; 12 | ROA; 37 | DAR; 33 | IND; 28 | LVS; 16 | RCH; 34 | | DOV; 11 | KAN; 18 | TEX; 25 | PHO; 20 | | 15th | 574 | |
| 2019 | RSS Racing | 93 | Chevy | | | | | | | | RCH; 20 | | | | | | | | | | | | | | | | | | | | | | | | | | 15th | 574 | |
| 2019 | Brandonbilt Motorsports | 68 | Chevy | | | | | | | | | | | CLT; 20 | | | | | | | | | | MOH; 24 | | | | | | | ROV; 17 | | | | | HOM; 13 | 15th | 574 | |
| 2020 | Brandonbilt Motorsports | 68 | Chevy | DAY; 7 | LVS; 11 | CAL; 33 | PHO; 12 | DAR; 13 | CLT; 8 | BRI; 7 | ATL; 12 | HOM; 14 | HOM; 36 | TAL; 11 | POC; 33 | IRC; 11 | KEN; 27 | KEN; 13 | TEX; 10 | KAN; 11 | ROA; 12 | DRC; 34 | DOV; 14 | DOV; 16 | DAY; 26 | DAR; 17 | RCH; 18 | RCH; 11 | BRI; 12 | LVS; 15 | TAL; 9 | ROV; 26 | KAN; 13 | TEX; 5 | MAR; 18 | PHO; 12 | 11th | 2170 | |
| 2021 | Brandonbilt Motorsports | 68 | Chevy | DAY; 6 | DRC; 8 | HOM; 34 | LVS; 11 | PHO; 3 | ATL; 33 | MAR; 27 | TAL; 7 | DAR; 24 | DOV; 10 | COA; 26 | CLT; 4 | MOH; 6 | TEX; 13 | NSH; 35 | POC; 15 | ROA; 11 | ATL; 31 | NHA; 17 | GLN; 12 | IRC; 34 | MCH; 40 | DAY; 34 | DAR; 28 | RCH; 8 | BRI; 14 | LVS; 22 | TAL; 1 | ROV; 22 | TEX; 33 | KAN; 14 | MAR; 36 | PHO; 20 | 16th | 620 | |
| 2022 | Brandonbilt Motorsports | 68 | Chevy | DAY; 10 | CAL; 11 | LVS; 29 | PHO; 13 | ATL; 18 | COA; 20 | RCH; 8 | MAR; 34 | TAL; 30 | DOV; 18 | DAR; 35 | TEX; 15 | CLT; 17 | PIR; 12 | NSH; 11 | ROA; 34 | ATL; 33 | NHA; 3 | POC; 13 | | MCH; 13 | | DAY; 4 | | | | TEX; 24 | TAL; 33 | | | | | | 17th | 538 | |
| 2022 | Mike Harmon Racing | 47 | Chevy | | | | | | | | | | | | | | | | | | | | IRC; 34 | | | | | | | | | | | | | | 17th | 538 | |
| 2022 | B. J. McLeod Motorsports | 5 | Chevy | | | | | | | | | | | | | | | | | | | | | | GLN; 32 | | | | BRI; 38 | | | | | | | | 17th | 538 | |
| 2022 | B. J. McLeod Motorsports | 78 | Chevy | | | | | | | | | | | | | | | | | | | | | | | | DAR; 29 | | | | | ROV; 20 | LVS | HOM | | | 17th | 538 | |
| 2022 | Our Motorsports | 02 | Chevy | | | | | | | | | | | | | | | | | | | | | | | | | KAN; 17 | | | | | | | | | 17th | 538 | |
| 2022 | SS-Green Light Racing | 08 | Ford | | | | | | | | | | | | | | | | | | | | | | | | | | | | | | | | MAR; 19 | PHO; 37 | 17th | 538 | |

==== Camping World Truck Series ====
NASCAR Camping World Truck Series results
| Year | Team | No. | Make | 1 | 2 | 3 | 4 | 5 | 6 | 7 | 8 | 9 | 10 | 11 | 12 | 13 | 14 | 15 | 16 | 17 | 18 | 19 | 20 | 21 | 22 | 23 | NCWTC | Pts | Ref |
|---|---|---|---|---|---|---|---|---|---|---|---|---|---|---|---|---|---|---|---|---|---|---|---|---|---|---|---|---|---|
| 2014 | Brandonbilt Motorsports | 86 | Chevy | DAY | MAR | KAN | CLT | DOV | TEX | GTW | KEN | IOW; 25 | ELD | POC | MCH | BRI | MSP | CHI | NHA; 19 | LVS | TAL | MAR; 24 | TEX | PHO | HOM | | 46th | 64 | |
| 2015 | Brandonbilt Motorsports | 86 | Chevy | DAY | ATL; 29 | MAR; DNQ | KAN | CLT; DNQ | DOV; 14 | TEX | GTW | IOW | KEN; 25 | ELD | POC | MCH | BRI | MSP | CHI | NHA; 27 | LVS | TAL | MAR; DNQ | TEX | PHO | HOM; 32 | 39th | 93 | |
| 2016 | Brandonbilt Motorsports | 86 | Chevy | DAY; 4 | ATL; 19 | MAR; 14 | KAN; 12 | DOV; 31 | CLT; 26 | TEX | IOW; 24 | | KEN; 20 | ELD; 22 | POC; 24 | BRI; 23 | MCH | MSP | CHI | NHA | LVS | TAL; 25 | MAR | TEX | PHO | HOM | 25th | 153 | |
| 2016 | MAKE Motorsports | 86 | Chevy | | | | | | | | | GTW; 32 | | | | | | | | | | | | | | | 25th | 153 | |
| 2017 | Martins Motorsports | 44 | Chevy | DAY; DNQ | ATL | MAR; 27 | KAN | | | | | | | | | | | | | | | | | | | | 97th | 0^{1} | |
| 2017 | Brandonbilt Motorsports | 86 | Chevy | | | | | CLT; DNQ | DOV | TEX | GTW | IOW | KEN | ELD | POC | MCH | BRI | MSP | CHI | NHA | LVS | TAL | MAR | TEX | PHO | HOM | 97th | 0^{1} | |

^{*} Season still in progress
^{1} Ineligible for series points
