= 2020 NASCAR Racing Experience 300 =

Race details
- Race 1 of 33 in the 2020 NASCAR Xfinity Series season
- Daytona International Speedway
- Date: February 15, 2020
- Location: Daytona International Speedway in Daytona Beach, Florida
- Course: Permanent racing facility
- Course length: 2.5 miles (4 km)
- Distance: 120 laps, 300 mi (480 km)
- Average speed: 136.64 mph

Pole position
| Driver | Myatt Snider | Richard Childress Racing |
- Time: 47.763

Most laps led
| Driver | Jeb Burton | JR Motorsports |
- Laps: 26

Winner
| No. 9 | Noah Gragson | JR Motorsports |

Television in the United States
- Network: FS1
- Announcers: Adam Alexander, Clint Bowyer, and Brad Keselowski

Radio in the United States
- Radio: MRN
- Booth announcers: Dave Moody and Jeff Striegle
- Turn announcers: Mike Bagley, Kyle Rickey, and Steve Post

The 2020 NASCAR Racing Experience 300 was a NASCAR Xfinity Series race held on February 15, 2020. It was contested over 120 laps on the 2.5-mile (4.0 km) asphalt superspeedway. It was the first race of the 2020 NASCAR Xfinity Series season. JR Motorsports driver Noah Gragson collected his first career Xfinity Series win in a finish under caution.

== Report ==
=== Background ===
Daytona International Speedway is one of three superspeedways to hold NASCAR races, the other two being Indianapolis Motor Speedway and Talladega Superspeedway. The standard track at Daytona International Speedway is a four-turn superspeedway that is 2.5 miles (4.0 km) long. The track's turns are banked at 31 degrees, while the front stretch, the location of the finish line, is banked at 18 degrees.

=== Entry list ===
- (R) denotes rookie driver.
- (i) denotes driver who is ineligible for series driver points.

| No. | Driver | Team | Manufacturer | Sponsor | Crew Chief |
|---|---|---|---|---|---|
| 0 | B.J. McLeod | JD Motorsports | Chevrolet | Opav | Wayne Carroll, Jr |
| 1 | Michael Annett | JR Motorsports | Chevrolet | AHA/Pilot Flying J | Travis Mack |
| 02 | Brett Moffitt (i) | Our Motorsports | Chevrolet | Plan B Sales | Joe Williams Jr. |
| 4 | Jesse Little (R) | JD Motorsports | Chevrolet | KSDT/Series Seating | Bryan Berry |
| 5 | Matt Mills | B. J. McLeod Motorsports | Toyota | J F Electric | George Ingram |
| 6 | David Starr | JD Motorsports | Chevrolet | Whataburger | Kase Kallenbach |
| 7 | Justin Allgaier | JR Motorsports | Chevrolet | BRANDT | Jason Burdett |
| 07 | Ray Black Jr. | SS-Green Light Racing | Chevrolet | CDA Tech | Jason Miller |
| 8 | Jeb Burton | JR Motorsports | Chevrolet | LS Tractor | Taylor Moyer |
| 08 | Joe Graf Jr. (R) | SS-Green Light Racing | Chevrolet | CORE Development Group | Patrick Donahue |
| 9 | Noah Gragson | JR Motorsports | Chevrolet | Bass Pro Shops/BRCC | David Elenz |
| 10 | Ross Chastain | Kaulig Racing | Chevrolet | Nutrien Ag Solutions | Bruce Schlicker |
| 11 | Justin Haley | Kaulig Racing | Chevrolet | LeafFilter Gutter Protection | Alex Yontz |
| 13 | Chad Finchum | MBM Motorsports | Toyota | Garrison Homes | Ryan Bell |
| 15 | Robby Lyons | JD Motorsports | Chevrolet | CSM/Carr & Sons Masonry | Mark Setzer |
| 16 | A. J. Allmendinger | Kaulig Racing | Chevrolet | Ellsworth Advisors | Lennie Chandler |
| 18 | Riley Herbst (R) | Joe Gibbs Racing | Toyota | Monster Energy | Dave Rogers |
| 19 | Brandon Jones | Joe Gibbs Racing | Toyota | Interstate Batteries | Jeff Meendering |
| 20 | Harrison Burton (R) | Joe Gibbs Racing | Toyota | Dex Imaging | Ben Beshore |
| 21 | Myatt Snider | Richard Childress Racing | Chevrolet | TaxSlayer | Andy Street |
| 22 | Austin Cindric | Team Penske | Ford | MoneyLion | Brian Wilson |
| 25 | Chris Cockrum | ACG Motorsports | Chevrolet | Advanced Communications Group | Jeff Spraker |
| 26 | Colin Garrett | Sam Hunt Racing | Toyota | The Rosie Network | Brian Keselowski |
| 36 | Alex Labbé | DGM Racing | Chevrolet | Globocam/Rousseau | Nathan Kennedy |
| 38 | Jeff Green | RSS Racing | Chevrolet | C2 Freight Resources | Clifford Turner |
| 39 | Ryan Sieg | RSS Racing | Chevrolet | CMR Roofing | Kevin Starland |
| 44 | Tommy Joe Martins | Martins Motorsports | Chevrolet | AAN Adjusters | Daniel Johnson |
| 47 | Joe Nemechek (i) | Mike Harmon Racing | Chevrolet | Trump-Pence 2020/Patriots PAC of America | Ed Jewett |
| 51 | Jeremy Clements | Jeremy Clements Racing | Chevrolet | Repairables.com | Andrew Abbott |
| 52 | J. J. Yeley (i) | Means Racing | Chevrolet | | Tim Brown |
| 61 | Austin Hill (i) | Hattori Racing | Toyota | AISIN Group | Dan Stillman |
| 66 | Timmy Hill | MBM Motorsports | Toyota | VSI Racing/RoofClaim.com | Sebastion Laforge |
| 68 | Brandon Brown | Brandonbilt Motorsports | Chevrolet | Larry's Lemonade | Doug Randolph |
| 74 | Mike Harmon | Mike Harmon Racing | Chevrolet | | Teddy Brown |
| 78 | Vinnie Miller | B. J. McLeod Motorsports | Toyota | UAP.ORG | Keith Wolfe |
| 90 | Caesar Bacarella | DGM Racing | Chevrolet | Maxim/Alpha Prime Regimen | Mario Gosselin |
| 92 | Josh Williams | DGM Racing | Chevrolet | Sleep Well/Harkin Construction | Adam Brenner |
| 93 | C. J. McLaughlin | RSS Racing | Chevrolet | Sci Aps | Kevyn Rebolledo |
| 98 | Chase Briscoe | Stewart-Haas Racing | Ford | Highpoint.com | Richard Boswell, II |
| 99 | Josh Bilicki | B. J. McLeod Motorsports | Toyota | DITEC Marine/Insurance King | Adam Brooks |
Official entry list

== Practice ==
=== First practice ===
Noah Gragson was the fastest in the first practice session with a time of 47.214 seconds and a speed of 190.621 mph (306.775 km/h).

| Pos | No. | Driver | Team | Manufacturer | Time | Speed |
|---|---|---|---|---|---|---|
| 1 | 9 | Noah Gragson | JR Motorsports | Chevrolet | 47.214 | 190.621 |
| 2 | 10 | Ross Chastain | Kaulig Racing | Chevrolet | 47.225 | 190.577 |
| 3 | 11 | Justin Haley | Kaulig Racing | Chevrolet | 47.226 | 190.573 |
Official first practice results

=== Final practice ===
Caesar Bacarella was the fastest in the final practice session with a time of 48.311 seconds and a speed of 186.293 mph (299.810 km/h).

| Pos | No. | Driver | Team | Manufacturer | Time | Speed |
|---|---|---|---|---|---|---|
| 1 | 90 | Caesar Bacarella | DGM Racing | Chevrolet | 48.311 | 186.293 |
| 2 | 68 | Brandon Brown | Brandonbilt Motorsports | Chevrolet | 48.461 | 185.716 |
| 3 | 39 | Ryan Sieg | RSS Racing | Chevrolet | 48.515 | 185.510 |
Official final practice results

== Qualifying ==
In his first Xfinity Series start, Myatt Snider scored the pole for the race with a time of 47.763 seconds and a speed of 188.430 mph (303.249 km/h). Colin Garrett, Tommy Joe Martins, Ross Chastain, and A. J. Allmendinger did not qualify for the race. Josh Bilicki, J. J. Yeley, and Mike Harmon made the field based on 2019 owner points, while Joe Nemechek made the field as a past champion. After qualifying, it was announced that Chastain would take over for Jeff Green in the No. 38.

=== Qualifying results ===
| Pos | No | Driver | Team | Manufacturer | Time |
|---|---|---|---|---|---|
| 1 | 21 | Myatt Snider | Richard Childress Racing | Chevrolet | 47.763 |
| 2 | 1 | Michael Annett | JR Motorsports | Chevrolet | 47.817 |
| 3 | 11 | Justin Haley | Kaulig Racing | Chevrolet | 47.849 |
| 4 | 8 | Jeb Burton | JR Motorsports | Chevrolet | 47.917 |
| 5 | 08 | Joe Graf Jr. (R) | SS-Green Light Racing | Chevrolet | 47.926 |
| 6 | 19 | Brandon Jones | Joe Gibbs Racing | Toyota | 47.936 |
| 7 | 18 | Riley Herbst (R) | Joe Gibbs Racing | Toyota | 47.981 |
| 8 | 20 | Harrison Burton (R) | Joe Gibbs Racing | Toyota | 47.985 |
| 9 | 39 | Ryan Sieg | RSS Racing | Chevrolet | 48.021 |
| 10 | 98 | Chase Briscoe | Stewart-Haas Racing | Ford | 48.032 |
| 11 | 68 | Brandon Brown | Brandonbilt Motorsports | Chevrolet | 48.070 |
| 12 | 9 | Noah Gragson | JR Motorsports | Chevrolet | 48.079 |
| 13 | 7 | Justin Allgaier | JR Motorsports | Chevrolet | 48.207 |
| 14 | 90 | Caesar Bacarella | DGM Racing | Chevrolet | 48.242 |
| 15 | 22 | Austin Cindric | Team Penske | Ford | 48.437 |
| 16 | 07 | Ray Black Jr. | SS-Green Light Racing | Chevrolet | 48.438 |
| 17 | 92 | Josh Williams | DGM Racing | Chevrolet | 48.446 |
| 18 | 4 | Jesse Little (R) | JD Motorsports | Chevrolet | 48.526 |
| 19 | 36 | Alex Labbé | DGM Racing | Chevrolet | 48.589 |
| 20 | 15 | Robby Lyons | JD Motorsports | Chevrolet | 48.598 |
| 21 | 93 | C. J. McLaughlin | RSS Racing | Chevrolet | 48.599 |
| 22 | 0 | B. J. McLeod | JD Motorsports | Chevrolet | 48.691 |
| 23 | 38 | Jeff Green | RSS Racing | Chevrolet | 48.705 |
| 24 | 02 | Brett Moffitt (i) | Our Motorsports | Chevrolet | 48.715 |
| 25 | 78 | Vinnie Miller | B. J. McLeod Motorsports | Toyota | 48.827 |
| 26 | 66 | Timmy Hill | MBM Motorsports | Toyota | 48.835 |
| 27 | 25 | Chris Cockrum | ACG Motorsports | Chevrolet | 48.837 |
| 28 | 61 | Austin Hill (i) | Hattori Racing | Toyota | 48.887 |
| 29 | 51 | Jeremy Clements | Jeremy Clements Racing | Chevrolet | 48.895 |
| 30 | 5 | Matt Mills | B. J. McLeod Motorsports | Toyota | 48.996 |
| 31 | 6 | David Starr | JD Motorsports | Chevrolet | 49.017 |
| 32 | 99 | Josh Bilicki | B. J. McLeod Motorsports | Toyota | 49.082 |
| 33 | 52 | J. J. Yeley (i) | Means Racing | Chevrolet | 49.202 |
| 34 | 74 | Mike Harmon | Mike Harmon Racing | Chevrolet | 49.377 |
| 35 | 10 | Ross Chastain | Kaulig Racing | Chevrolet | 50.602 (DNQ) |
| 36 | 47 | Joe Nemechek (i) | Mike Harmon Racing | Chevrolet | 49.184 |
| 37 | 26 | Colin Garrett | Sam Hunt Racing | Toyota | 49.027 (DNQ) |
| 38 | 44 | Tommy Joe Martins | Martins Motorsports | Chevrolet | 49.095 (DNQ) |
| 39 | 13 | Chad Finchum | MBM Motorsports | Toyota | 49.116 |
| 40 | 16 | A. J. Allmendinger | Kaulig Racing | Chevrolet | 51.113 (DNQ) |
Official qualifying results

== Race ==
=== Race results ===
==== Stage Results ====
Stage One Laps: 30

| Pos | No | Driver | Team | Manufacturer | Points |
|---|---|---|---|---|---|
| 1 | 8 | Jeb Burton | JR Motorsports | Chevrolet | 10 |
| 2 | 1 | Michael Annett | JR Motorsports | Chevrolet | 9 |
| 3 | 7 | Justin Allgaier | JR Motorsports | Chevrolet | 8 |
| 4 | 9 | Noah Gragson | JR Motorsports | Chevrolet | 7 |
| 5 | 11 | Justin Haley | Kaulig Racing | Chevrolet | 6 |
| 6 | 22 | Austin Cindric | Team Penske | Ford | 5 |
| 7 | 21 | Myatt Snider | Richard Childress Racing | Chevrolet | 4 |
| 8 | 20 | Harrison Burton (R) | Joe Gibbs Racing | Toyota | 3 |
| 9 | 36 | Alex Labbé | DGM Racing | Chevrolet | 2 |
| 10 | 38 | Ross Chastain | RSS Racing | Chevrolet | 1 |

Stage Two Laps: 30

| Pos | No | Driver | Team | Manufacturer | Points |
|---|---|---|---|---|---|
| 1 | 7 | Justin Allgaier | JR Motorsports | Chevrolet | 10 |
| 2 | 11 | Justin Haley | Kaulig Racing | Chevrolet | 9 |
| 3 | 8 | Jeb Burton | JR Motorsports | Chevrolet | 8 |
| 4 | 39 | Ryan Sieg | RSS Racing | Chevrolet | 7 |
| 5 | 22 | Austin Cindric | Team Penske | Ford | 6 |
| 6 | 68 | Brandon Brown | Brandonbilt Motorsports | Chevrolet | 5 |
| 7 | 38 | Ross Chastain | RSS Racing | Chevrolet | 4 |
| 8 | 19 | Brandon Jones | Joe Gibbs Racing | Toyota | 3 |
| 9 | 9 | Noah Gragson | JR Motorsports | Chevrolet | 2 |
| 10 | 98 | Chase Briscoe | Stewart-Haas Racing | Ford | 1 |

=== Final Stage Results ===
Laps: 60

| Pos | Grid | No | Driver | Team | Manufacturer | Laps | Points | Status |
|---|---|---|---|---|---|---|---|---|
| 1 | 12 | 9 | Noah Gragson | JR Motorsports | Chevrolet | 120 | 49 | Running |
| 2 | 8 | 20 | Harrison Burton (R) | Joe Gibbs Racing | Toyota | 120 | 38 | Running |
| 3 | 26 | 66 | Timmy Hill | MBM Motorsports | Toyota | 120 | 0 | Running |
| 4 | 6 | 19 | Brandon Jones | Joe Gibbs Racing | Toyota | 120 | 36 | Running |
| 5 | 10 | 98 | Chase Briscoe | Stewart-Haas Racing | Ford | 120 | 34 | Running |
| 6 | 3 | 11 | Justin Haley | Kaulig Racing | Chevrolet | 120 | 46 | Running |
| 7 | 11 | 68 | Brandon Brown | Brandonbilt Motorsports | Chevrolet | 120 | 35 | Running |
| 8 | 16 | 07 | Ray Black Jr. | SS-Green Light Racing | Chevrolet | 120 | 29 | Running |
| 9 | 9 | 39 | Ryan Sieg | RSS Racing | Chevrolet | 120 | 35 | Running |
| 10 | 19 | 36 | Alex Labbé | DGM Racing | Chevrolet | 120 | 29 | Running |
| 11 | 2 | 1 | Michael Annett | JR Motorsports | Chevrolet | 119 | 35 | Accident |
| 12 | 34 | 52 | J. J. Yeley | Means Racing | Chevrolet | 119 | 25 | Running |
| 13 | 22 | 0 | B. J. McLeod | JD Motorsports | Chevrolet | 119 | 24 | Running |
| 14 | 25 | 78 | Vinnie Miller | B. J. McLeod Motorsports | Toyota | 119 | 23 | Running |
| 15 | 36 | 47 | Joe Nemechek (i) | Mike Harmon Racing | Chevrolet | 119 | 0 | Running |
| 16 | 35 | 74 | Mike Harmon | Mike Harmon Racing | Chevrolet | 119 | 21 | Running |
| 17 | 20 | 15 | Robby Lyons | JD Motorsports | Chevrolet | 119 | 20 | Running |
| 18 | 31 | 6 | David Starr | JD Motorsports | Chevrolet | 119 | 19 | Running |
| 19 | 18 | 4 | Jesse Little (R) | JD Motorsports | Chevrolet | 118 | 18 | Accident |
| 20 | 33 | 13 | Chad Finchum | MBM Motorsports | Toyota | 118 | 17 | Running |
| 21 | 32 | 99 | Josh Bilicki | B. J. McLeod Motorsports | Toyota | 117 | 16 | Running |
| 22 | 23 | 38 | Ross Chastain | RSS Racing | Chevrolet | 115 | 19 | Running |
| 23 | 4 | 8 | Jeb Burton | JR Motorsports | Chevrolet | 114 | 32 | Accident |
| 24 | 24 | 02 | Brett Moffitt (i) | Our Motorsports | Chevrolet | 114 | 0 | Accident |
| 25 | 15 | 22 | Austin Cindric | Team Penske | Ford | 113 | 23 | Accident |
| 26 | 17 | 92 | Josh Williams | DGM Racing | Chevrolet | 113 | 11 | Accident |
| 27 | 21 | 93 | C. J. McLaughlin | RSS Racing | Chevrolet | 113 | 10 | Running |
| 28 | 29 | 51 | Jeremy Clements | Jeremy Clements Racing | Chevrolet | 113 | 9 | Running |
| 29 | 14 | 90 | Caesar Bacarella | DGM Racing | Chevrolet | 112 | 8 | Accident |
| 30 | 13 | 7 | Justin Allgaier | JR Motorsports | Chevrolet | 107 | 25 | Accident |
| 31 | 30 | 5 | Matt Mills | B. J. McLeod Motorsports | Toyota | 101 | 6 | Electrical |
| 32 | 7 | 18 | Riley Herbst (R) | Joe Gibbs Racing | Toyota | 59 | 5 | Accident |
| 33 | 1 | 21 | Myatt Snider | Richard Childress Racing | Chevrolet | 59 | 8 | Accident |
| 34 | 27 | 25 | Chris Cockrum | ACG Motorsports | Chevrolet | 59 | 3 | Accident |
| 35 | 28 | 61 | Austin Hill (i) | Hattori Racing | Toyota | 37 | 0 | Accident |
| 36 | 5 | 08 | Joe Graf Jr. (R) | SS-Green Light Racing | Chevrolet | 37 | 1 | Accident |
Official race results

=== Race statistics ===
- Lead changes: 12 among 8 different drivers
- Cautions/Laps: 7 for 28
- Red flags: 1
- Time of race: 2 hours, 11 minutes, and 44 seconds
- Average speed: 136.64 mph (219.90 km/h)

== Media ==
=== Television ===
The NASCAR Racing Experience 300 was carried by FS1 in the United States. Adam Alexander, Stewart-Haas Racing driver Clint Bowyer, and Team Penske driver Brad Keselowski called the race from the booth, with Regan Smith and Matt Yocum covering pit road.

FS1
| Booth announcers | Pit reporters |
|---|---|
| Lap-by-lap: Adam Alexander Color-commentator: Clint Bowyer Color-commentator: Brad Keselowski | Regan Smith Matt Yocum |

=== Radio ===
The Motor Racing Network (MRN) called the race for radio, which was simulcast on SiriusXM NASCAR Radio. Dave Moody and Jeff Striegle anchored the action from the booth. Mike Bagley called the action from Turns 1 & 2, Kyle Rickey worked the backstretch, and Steve Post called the race through turns 3 & 4. NASCAR Hall of Fame Executive Director Winston Kelley anchored pit road and was joined by Dillon Welch.

MRN Radio
| Booth announcers | Turn announcers | Pit reporters |
|---|---|---|
| Lead announcer: Dave Moody Announcer: Jeff Striegle | Turns 1 & 2: Mike Bagley Backstretch: Kyle Rickey Turns 3 & 4: Steve Post | Winston Kelley Dillon Welch |

== Standings after the race ==
Drivers' Championship standings

| Pos | Driver | Points |
|---|---|---|
| 1 | Noah Gragson | 49 |
| 2 | Justin Haley | 46 (-3) |
| 3 | Harrison Burton (R) | 38 (-11) |
| 4 | Brandon Jones | 36 (-13) |
| 5 | Brandon Brown | 35 (-14) |
| 6 | Ryan Sieg | 35 (-14) |
| 7 | Michael Annett | 35 (-14) |
| 8 | Chase Briscoe | 34 (-15) |
| 9 | Jeb Burton | 32 (-17) |
| 10 | Ray Black Jr. | 29 (-20) |
| 11 | Alex Labbé | 29 (-20) |
| 12 | J. J. Yeley | 25 (-24) |
Official driver's standings

Note: Only the first 12 positions are included for the driver standings.

| Previous race: 2019 Ford EcoBoost 300 | NASCAR Xfinity Series; 2020 season | Next race: 2020 Boyd Gaming 300 |
