= Joe Gibbs Racing in the NASCAR O'Reilly Auto Parts Series =

Since 1997

Joe Gibbs Racing's O'Reilly Auto Parts Series operation began in 1997 with the No. 18 driven by Bobby Labonte. Over time, they have expanded into one of the strongest teams in the series. The team has seen six owners championships, alongside 4 drivers, playing a large role in raising young talent. The 2008 season saw the No. 20 won the owner's championship. The 2009 season with Kyle Busch, 2016 with Daniel Suárez, 2021 with Daniel Hemric, and 2022 with Ty Gibbs, of which three of these also won the Owners' championship. In the 2025 season, the No. 19 won the owner's title. They currently host seats for Taylor Gray, William Sawalich, Brandon Jones and many more.

== Cars ==
=== Car No. 4 history ===
In 2000, JGR purchased Diamond Ridge Motorsports from Gary Bechtel, and picked up the No. 4 team. They switched the car to Pontiacs and gained sponsor Porter-Cable after Lance left. Purvis finished 2nd three times at Milwaukee Mile, Gateway and IRP. He also finished third at Talladega. However, Purvis's new team could not qualify at Charlotte and Darlington. Unfortunately, Purvis was injured at Myrtle Beach and could not race at Watkins Glen. Curtis Markham replaced him for that race. Despite not making three races, Purvis finished a respectable 11th in points, with four top-fives and eleven top-tens.

==== Car No. 4 results ====
Year	Driver	No.	Make	1	2	3	4	5	6	7	8	9	10	11	12	13	14	15	16	17	18	19	20	21	22	23	24	25	26	27	28	29	30	31	32	Owners	Pts
2000	Jeff Purvis	4	Pontiac	DAY; 29	CAR; 43	LVS; 7	ATL; 30	DAR; DNQ	BRI; 14	TEX; 10	NSV; 7	TAL; 3	CAL; 29	RCH; 38	NHA; 41	CLT; DNQ	DOV; 12	SBO; 17	MYB; 42		MLW; 2	NZH; 6	PPR; 13	GTY; 2	IRP; 2	MCH; 12	BRI; 7	DAR; 23	RCH; 31	DOV; 19	CLT; 27	CAR; 38	MEM; 10	PHO; 10	HOM; 11		
2000	Curtis Markham	4	Pontiac																	GLN; 17																	

=== Car No. 11 history ===
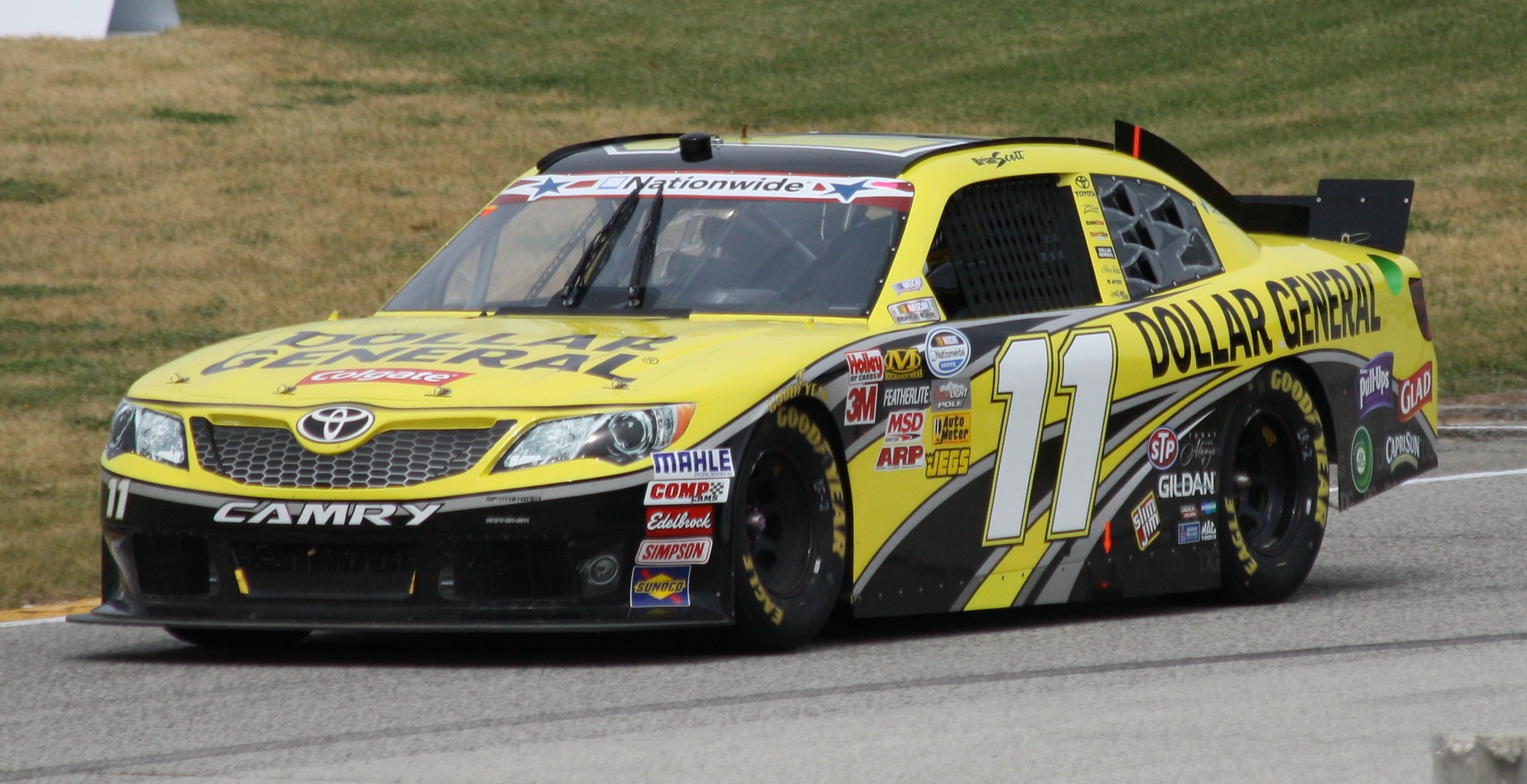
Brian Scott at Road America in 2012.

Brian Scott (2011–2012)

The No. 11 team began racing in 2011. JGR signed 22-year-old Brian Scott (former driver of the No. 11 with Braun Racing) to a two-year contract, with Kevin Kidd announced as the crew chief, and Scott bringing sponsorship from his family-owned Shore Lodge. The new team was constantly hampered by bad luck during races, with 5 DNF's on the season. Scott earned a pole, two top 5s and seven top 10s, finishing 8th in points. For 2012, Dollar General expanded its sponsorship deal with JGR, sponsoring the No. 11 car for the full season. Despite showing speed, the team continued to struggle finishing races (7 DNF's), and had a best finish of 3rd at Dover, with Scott finishing 9th in points.

Elliott Sadler (2013–2014)

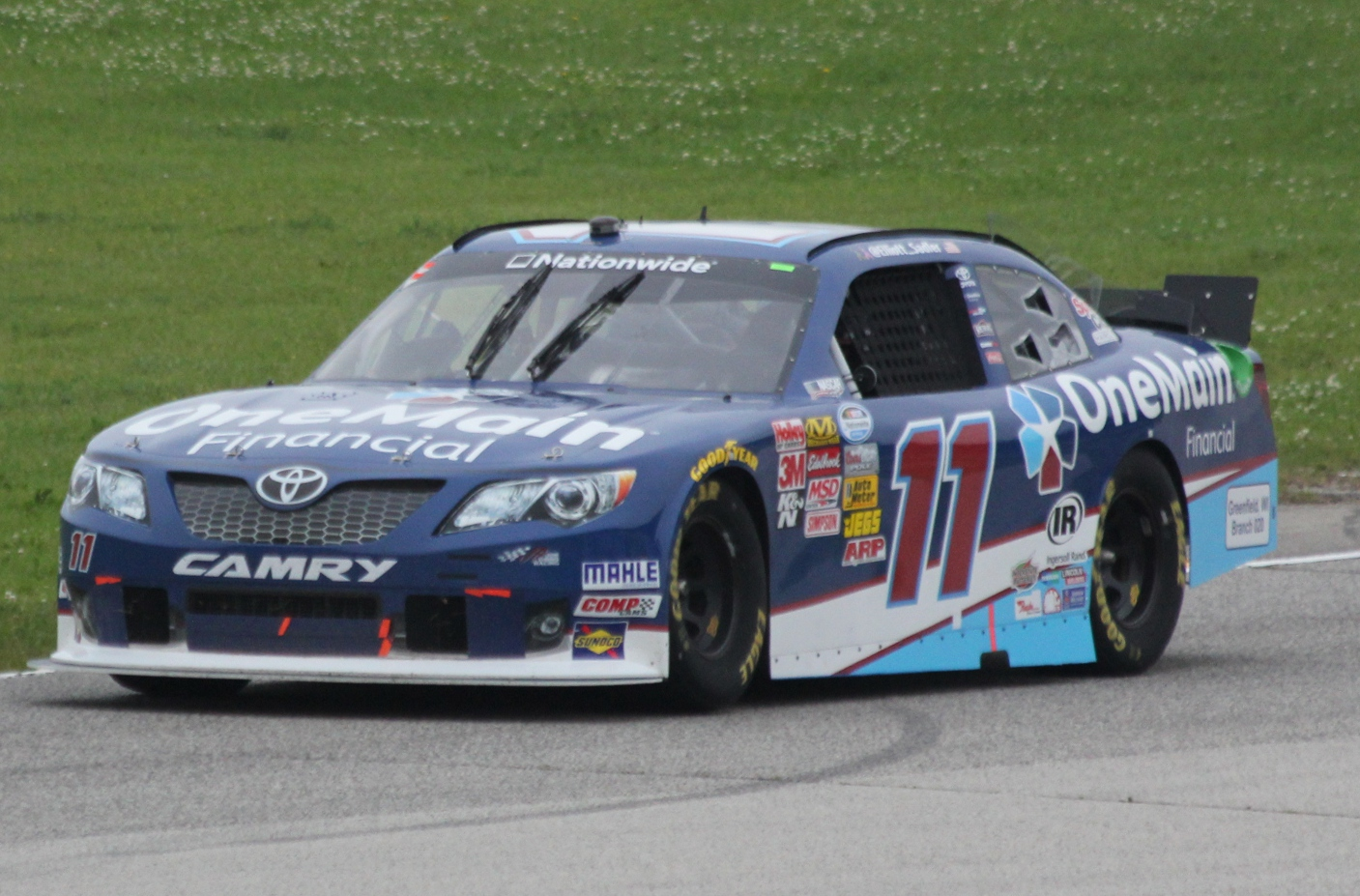
Elliott Sadler at Road America in 2014.

In 2013, Scott was replaced by veteran Elliott Sadler, who finished second in the championship standings in the two prior seasons. Sadler brought sponsorship from OneMain Financial with him from Richard Childress Racing. After winning four races in 2012, Sadler went winless in 2013, though he did score 20 top 10s en route to a fourth-place points finish. Sadler scored his first win for JGR at Talladega in 2014, leading a race high 40 laps. On October 31, 2014, it was announced that Sadler would depart for Roush Fenway Racing's Nationwide program, taking the OneMain sponsorship with him. The team's points and crew were moved to the No. 18 for the 2015 season, and the number was reassigned in 2016 to Kaulig Racing for Blake Koch.

==== Car No. 11 results ====
Year	Driver	No.	Make	1	2	3	4	5	6	7	8	9	10	11	12	13	14	15	16	17	18	19	20	21	22	23	24	25	26	27	28	29	30	31	32	33	34	Owners	Pts
2011	Brian Scott	11	Toyota	DAY; 34	PHO; 9	LVS; 14	BRI; 12	CAL; 13	TEX; 10	TAL; 11	NSH; 22	RCH; 15	DAR; 29	DOV; 30	IOW; 27	CLT; 8	CHI; 17	MCH; 17	ROA; 16	DAY; 12	KEN; 15	NHA; 17	NSH; 17	IRP; 15	IOW; 14	GLN; 14	CGV; 12	BRI; 10	ATL; 12	RCH; 32	CHI; 3	DOV; 11	KAN; 17	CLT; 5	TEX; 12	PHO; 41	HOM; 9	15th	947
2012	Brian Scott	11	Toyota	DAY; 37	PHO; 14	LVS; 34	BRI; 35	CAL; 4	TEX; 37	RCH; 14	TAL; 36	DAR; 7	IOW; 11	CLT; 31	DOV; 3	MCH; 9	ROA; 7	KEN; 30	DAY; 32	NHA; 12	CHI; 11	IND; 14	IOW; 18	GLN; 10	CGV; 24	BRI; 34	ATL; 11	RCH; 28	CHI; 10	KEN; 11	DOV; 7	CLT; 8	KAN; 26	TEX; 22	PHO; 8	HOM; 7		15th	853
2013	Elliott Sadler	11	Toyota	DAY; 15	PHO; 5	LVS; 5	BRI; 36	CAL; 7	TEX; 13	RCH; 6	TAL; 11	DAR; 2	CLT; 13	DOV; 28	IOW; 3	MCH; 8	ROA; 9	KEN; 2	DAY; 3	NHA; 18	CHI; 4*	IND; 13	IOW; 8	GLN; 5	MOH; 6	BRI; 10	ATL; 18	RCH; 8	CHI; 19	KEN; 14	DOV; 5	KAN; 10	CLT; 36	TEX; 7	PHO; 8	HOM; 16		7th	1090
2014	Elliott Sadler	11	Toyota	DAY; 5	PHO; 6	LVS; 13	BRI; 17	CAL; 5	TEX; 10	DAR; 2	RCH; 6	TAL; 1*	IOW; 5	CLT; 12	DOV; 9	MCH; 17	ROA; 9	KEN; 10	DAY; 21	NHA; 6	CHI; 10	IND; 15	IOW; 10	GLN; 7	MOH; 7	BRI; 29	ATL; 10	RCH; 8	CHI; 6	KEN; 13	DOV; 5	KAN; 7	CLT; 9	TEX; 9	PHO; 3	HOM; 9		6th	1154

=== Car No. 18 history ===
Part-time (1997, 1999)

JGR made their debut in the Busch Series in 1997. They fielded the No. 18 Shell Oil Pontiac for Bobby Labonte at Charlotte, where he finished 9th.

In 1999, the No. 18 made a return with sponsorship from MBNA for 1999. Labonte ran only one race before he suffered shoulder injuries in a qualifying crash at Darlington. Later in the year, Jason Leffler, like Stewart an accomplished open wheel racer, attempted five races in the car that year and qualified for four. His best finish was a 20th at Memphis Motorsports Park. Andy Hillenburg additionally ran and finished 3rd at Daytona. J. D. Gibbs would attempt five races in the No. 18, however he failed to qualify for all but one race at Rockingham, in which he finished 41st after crashing out. At Watkins Glen, the 18 team entered as car No. 8N, but failed to qualify.

Jason Leffler (2000)

Leffler ran the car full-time in 2000, winning a pole at Texas Motor Speedway, and posting three top-ten finishes. After that season, he left for the Cup Series with Chip Ganassi Racing, and Jeff Purvis took his place.

Jeff Purvis and Mike McLaughlin (2001)

Purvis started strong and was seventh in points but was released after the GNC Live Well 250 because of sponsorship issues. Mike McLaughlin replaced him, finishing seventh in points that season.

Mike McLaughlin (2002)

McLaughlin returned for 2002, and despite going winless in 2002, he moved up to fourth place in points. However, owner Joe Gibbs wanted his son Coy in a full-time ride, leaving McLaughlin without a ride.

Coy Gibbs (2003)

In his rookie season, The now late Coy Gibbs drove the No. 18 full time in 2003. Gibbs had two Top 10 finishes and finished runner-up to David Stremme for Rookie of the Year.

Part-time (2004)

The team scaled back to a part-time schedule for 2004. In November 2003, JGR signed highly touted USAC Champion J. J. Yeley to a multi-year contract, beginning his stock car career with eight ARCA Menards Series events and 10-12 Busch Series races in the 2004 season. The Home Depot's Vigoro Lawn and Garden Products would sponsor Yeley's efforts, making their BGN debut at Las Vegas in March. In his first race, Yeley qualified a strong seventh, but finished 23rd and two laps down. Yeley would end up running 17 races, garnering four Top 10 finishes and finishing fourth in Rookie of the Year standings behind future Cup drivers Kyle Busch, Clint Bowyer, and Paul Menard. Bobby Labonte ran two races with a best finish of 7th, while Denny Hamlin finished a strong sixth at the fall race at Darlington.

J. J. Yeley (2005–2006)

Yeley ran the car full-time in 2005, finishing in the top-ten twelve times and finishing 11th in points. Yeley continued to run full-time in 2006, finishing 5th in the points standings with three poles, nine Top 5s, 22 Top 10s, and 27 Top 15s. Yeley announced in Daytona that he would be driving in the No. 1 Miccosukee Gaming and Resorts-sponsored Chevrolet for Phoenix Racing in the 2007 NASCAR Busch Series.

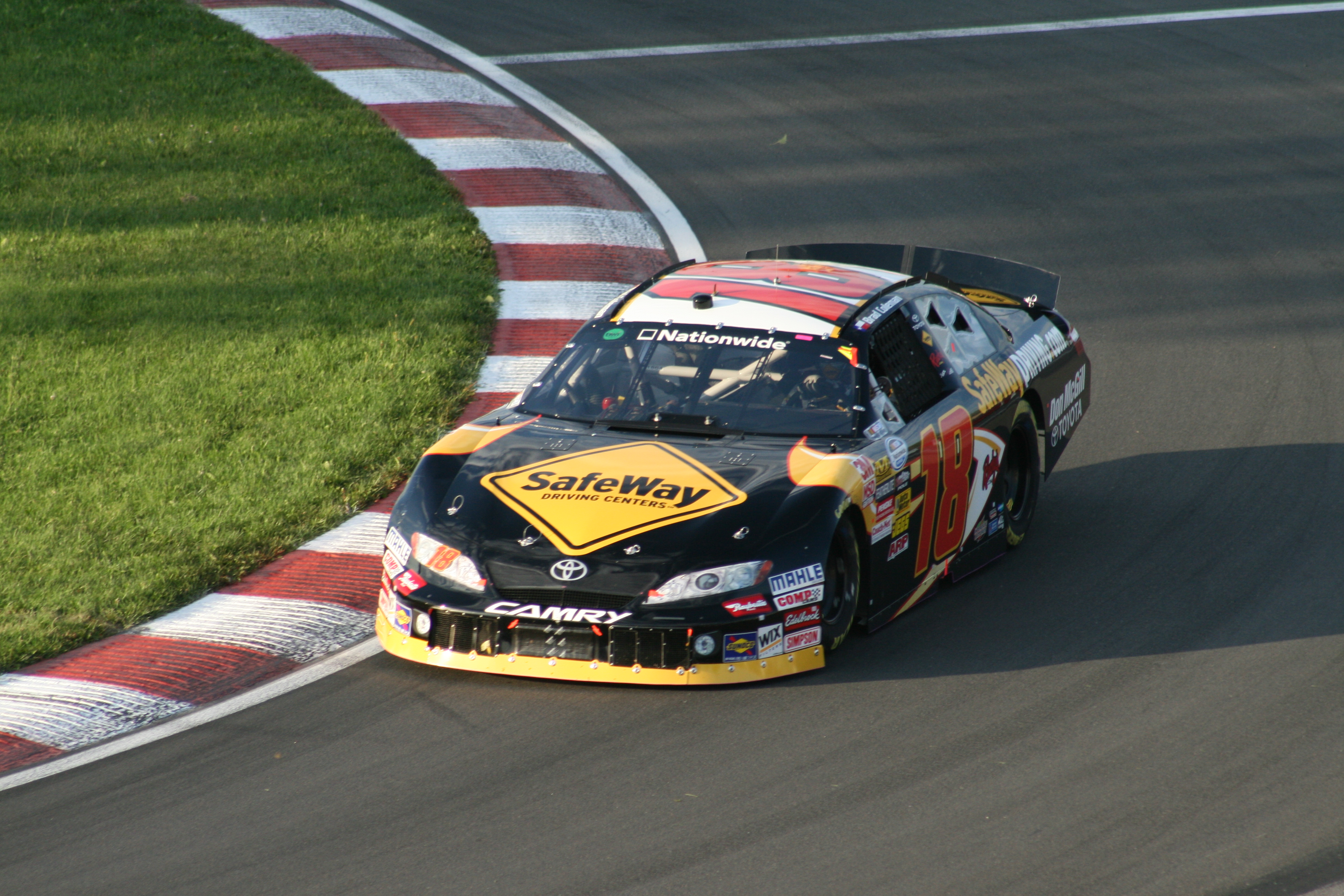
Brad Coleman at Circuit Gilles Villeneuve in 2010.

Multiple drivers (2007)

In January 2007, former Brewco Motorsports development driver and ARCA standout Brad Coleman signed to drive the No. 18 car for 17 of the 35 races, with Carino's Italian Grill sponsoring his efforts. Kevin Conway was signed for eight races beginning at Bristol in March with Z-Line Designs sponsoring, while Tony Stewart and development driver Aric Almirola filled out the schedule with Goody's Powder and Conagra Brands sponsorships. Almirola put the car on the pole at the season opener at Daytona, and had a best finish of 4th at Charlotte. Coleman earned his first career Busch Series pole at Talladega, and had three Top 5s and five Top 10s. Without sponsorship for a full-time ride with JGR, Coleman returned to the renamed Baker Curb Racing following the season and signed a development contract with Hall of Fame Racing.

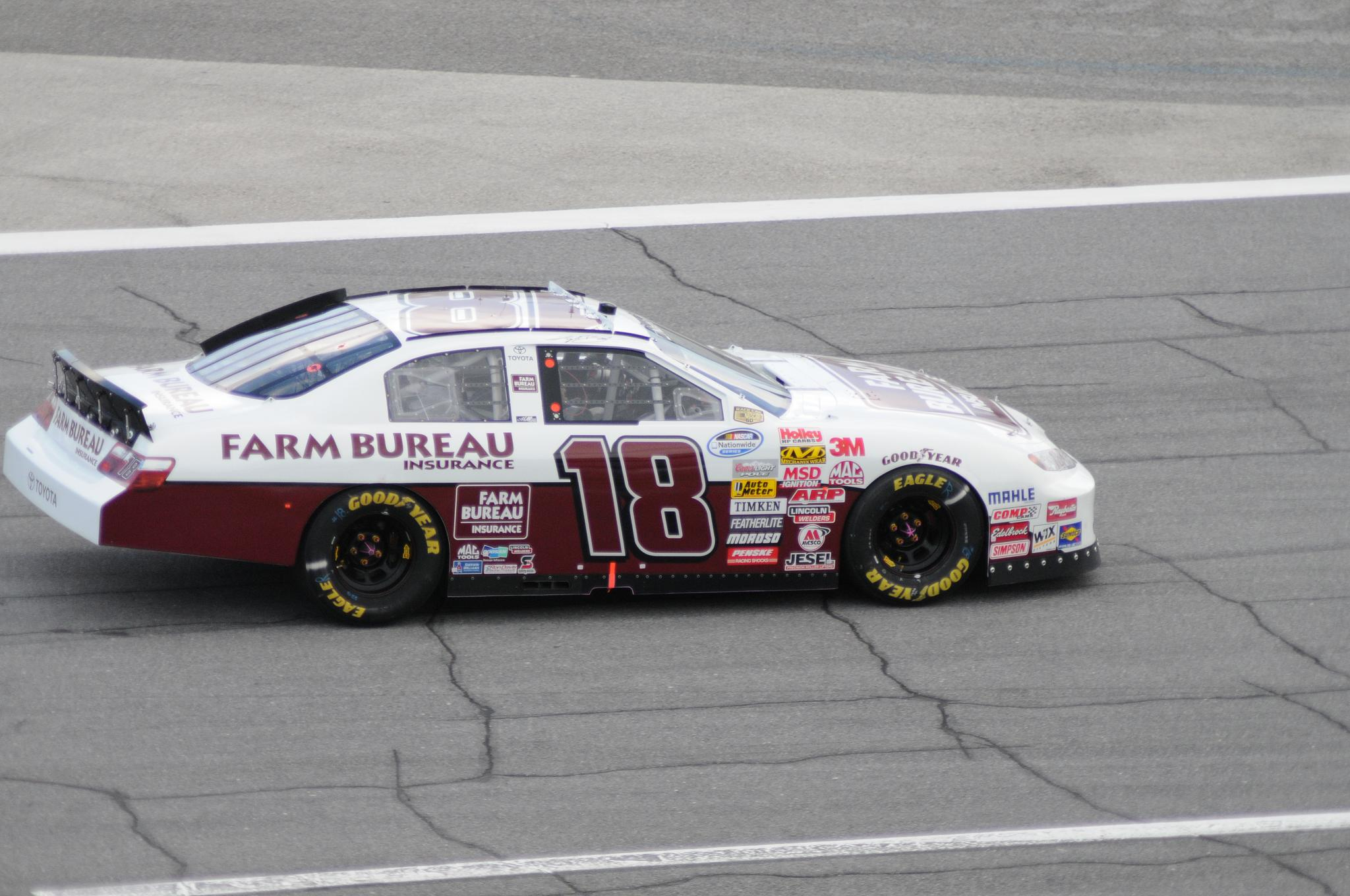
Kyle Busch in 2008.

Part-time (2008)

For 2008, the No. 18 was piloted by the team of Denny Hamlin and Kyle Busch with sponsorship coming from Southern Farm Bureau, Interstate Batteries, and Z-Line Designs. Despite running a partial schedule, Busch won ten races in 2008, including eight in the No. 18, and would finish sixth in points while Hamlin scored a single victory in the No. 18 at Dover. 18-year-old JGR development driver Marc Davis made his one and only national series start for the team in October at Memphis Motorsports Park with DLP HDTV sponsoring.

Kyle Busch (2009)

In 2009, Kyle Busch went full time in the Nationwide Series, driving the No. 18 Z-Line Designs / NOS Toyota. Busch won 9 races and won the 2009 NASCAR Nationwide Series Title.

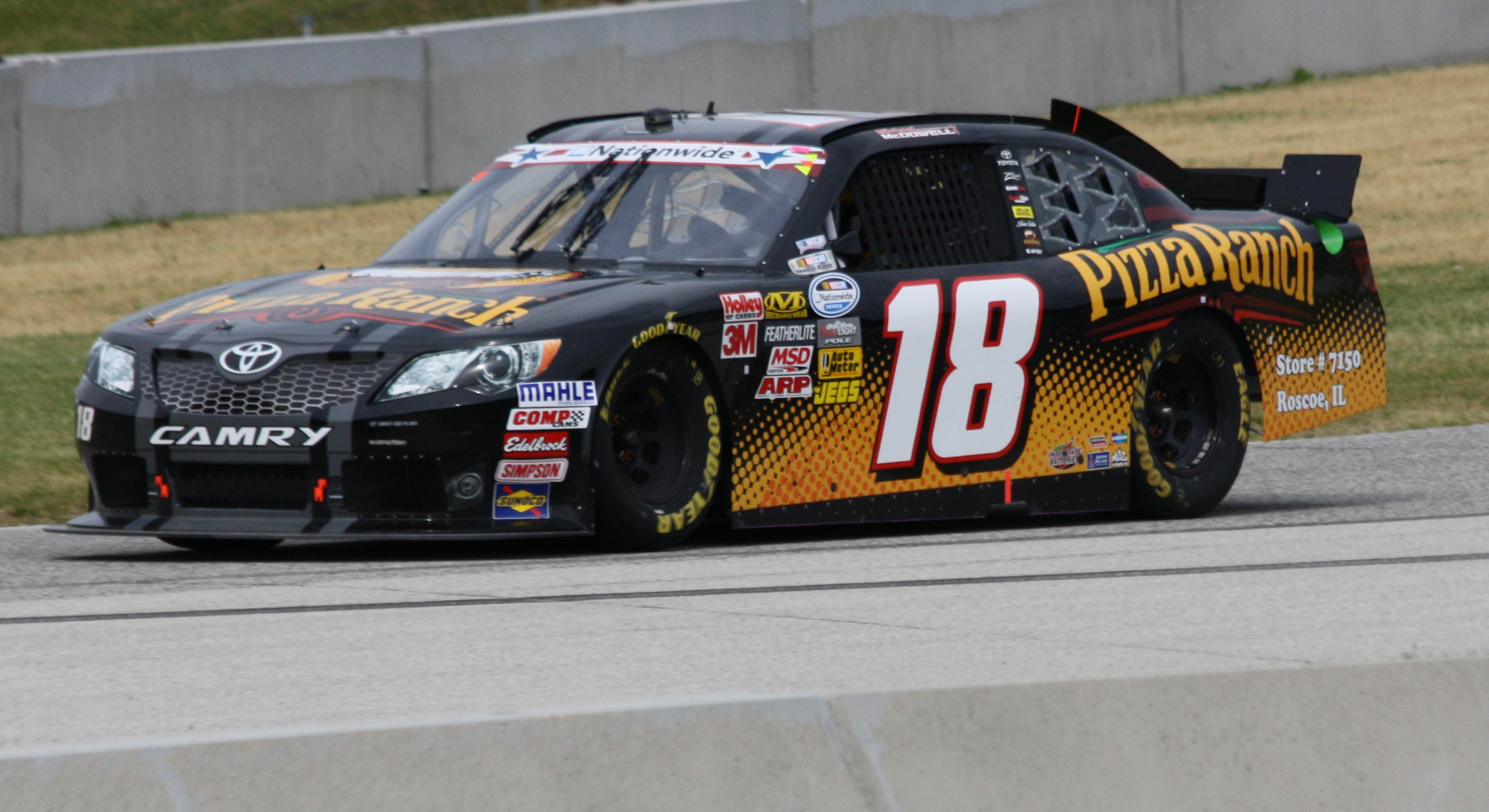
Michael McDowell at Road America in 2012.

Multiple drivers (2010–2013)

In 2010, Kyle Busch ran most of the races that were paired with Sprint Cup Series races, while Brad Coleman returned to run the stand-alone races. For 2011, Busch drove the No. 18 for a majority of the season, splitting the ride with Michael McDowell, who ran both Iowa races, Lucas Oil Raceway, and the road courses Road America and Circuit Gilles Villeneuve with sponsorship from Pizza Ranch. McDowell won the pole at Road America and dominated until late-race contact with another car. Drivers Kelly Bires, Drew Herring, and Joey Logano also took turns in the No. 18. Bires ran at Richmond and Chicago with International Comfort Products, Herring drove at the second Nashville race with Sport Clips, and Logano drove the No. 18 at Chicago, Dover, Kansas, and Phoenix. For 2012, the No. 18 would have a similar lineup, featuring Hamlin, Logano, Herring, McDowell, and Ryan Truex. Logano would take seven victories with the No. 18 team, handing the team the Nationwide Owners' Championship. For 2013, the No. 18 and 20 teams swapped. Matt Kenseth drove the No. 18 for 16 races with sponsorship from Reser's Fine Foods and GameStop. He won the July race at Daytona and the October race at Kansas. The No. 18 car did not run in 2014.

Daniel Suárez (2015)

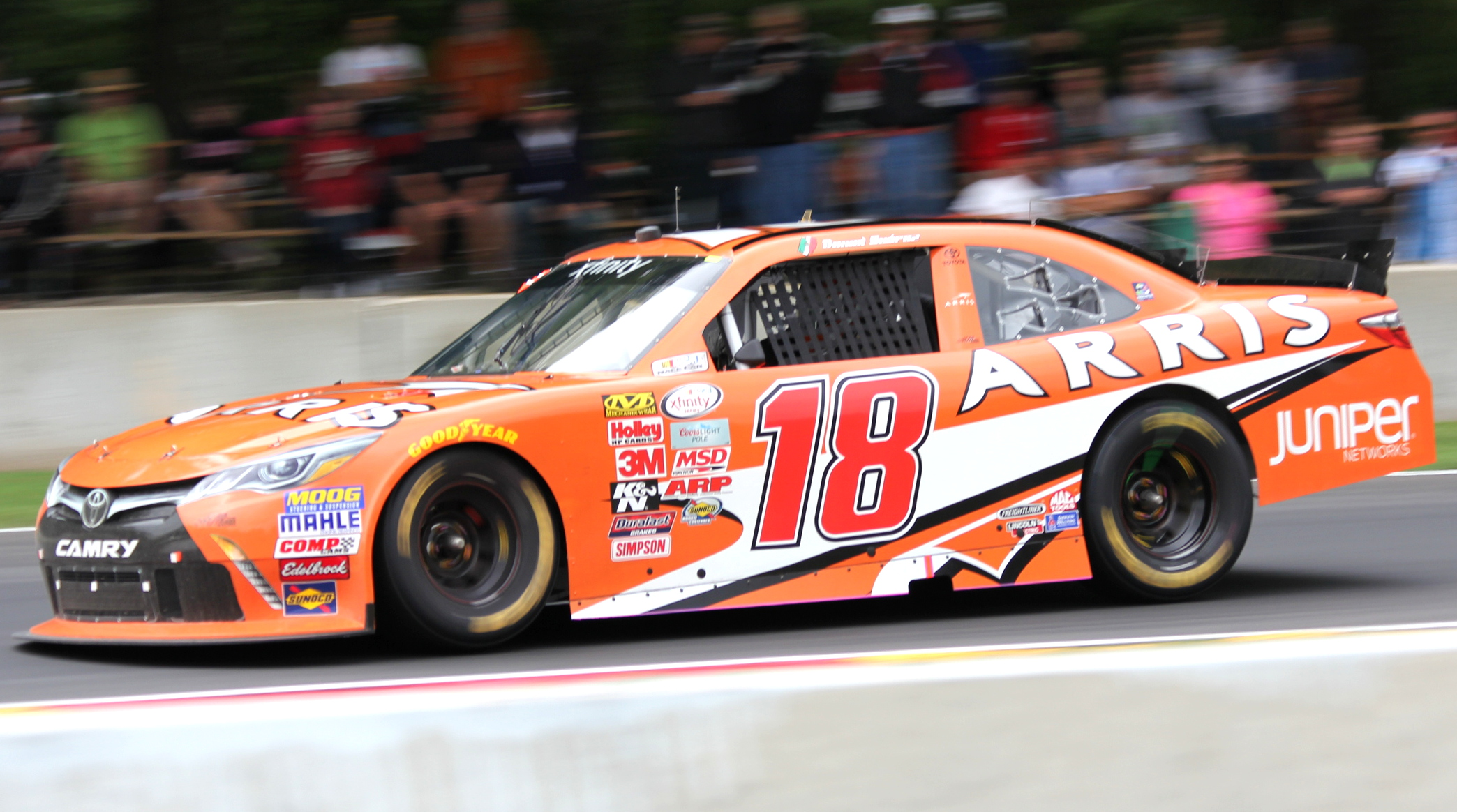
Daniel Suárez at Road America in 2015

On August 19, 2014, JGR announced that Toyota Series and K&N Pro Series East driver Daniel Suárez would drive the No. 18 full-time in 2015 with a sponsorship from Arris, running for Rookie of the Year. Suárez had a strong rookie season, earning eight top fives, 18 top tens, and three poles to finish fifth in points and beat out Bubba Wallace for Rookie of the Year.

Multiple drivers (2016–2019)

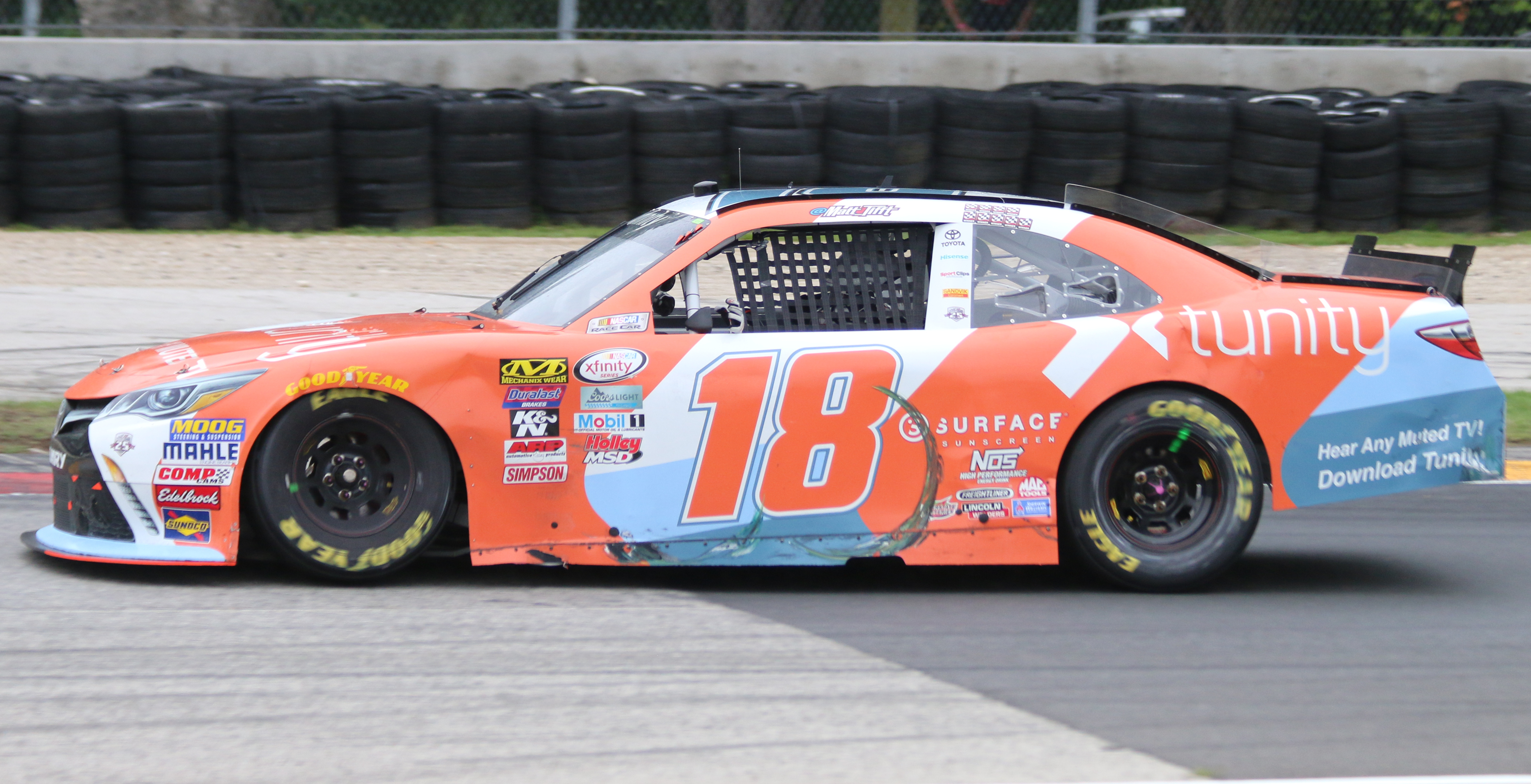
Owen Kelly at Road America in 2016.

The team inherited the No. 54's points and equipment in 2016, fielding multiple drivers, starting with former JGR driver Bobby Labonte at Daytona. Kyle Busch drove a limited schedule, with former sponsor NOS Energy Drink (owned by Monster Beverage) funding both Busch and Labonte's efforts. Matt Tifft was scheduled to drive 13 races for the team, but was replaced for several races as he recovered from a removal of a tumor in his brain. Sam Hornish Jr. replaced Tifft for the June Xfinity race at Iowa, and won the race. David Ragan ran the July Xfinity race at Daytona, and won the pole, and was in contention for the win, but crashed on the final lap of the race. Road course specialist Owen Kelly ran the road course races at Mid-Ohio and Road America, and Dakoda Armstrong ran the July Xfinity race at Iowa. The No. 18 car won 12 races in 2016, ten with Busch, one at Charlotte with Hamlin, and one with Hornish at Iowa.

For 2017, multiple drivers again raced in the No. 18. Daniel Suárez drove 12 races beginning at Daytona in February with sponsorship from Juniper. Kyle Busch drove 10 races with sponsor NOS Energy Drink beginning at Atlanta in March, winning 5 races at Atlanta, Kentucky, Loudon, Watkins Glen, and Bristol. Kyle Busch Motorsports driver Christopher Bell made his Xfinity Series debut with the No. 18 team at Charlotte, finishing 4th. Bell would also drive the car at Road America, Kansas, Texas, and Phoenix. Bell won the race at Kansas after catching and passing teammate Erik Jones for his first career Xfinity Series win in his 5th start. Bell had sponsorship from SiriusXM at Charlotte, Toyotacare at Road America, JBL at Kansas, and Safelite at Texas and Phoenix. ARCA driver Kyle Benjamin drove the No. 18 with sponsorship from Reser's Fine Foods and Sport Clips at both Iowa races and Kentucky in September with a best finish of 2nd at the July Iowa race to teammate Ryan Preece. Regan Smith returned to the Xfinity series in a one-race deal in the No. 18 at Mid-Ohio with sponsorship from Interstate Batteries. Denny Hamlin also drove one race in the No. 18, running a throwback scheme at Darlington with Sport Clips sponsoring, Hamlin won the race. Ryan Preece drove the No. 18 car at Homestead with Safelite as the sponsor and finished 5th in preparation for an expanded ten–race schedule with the team in 2018. Preece shared the car with JGR's cup series drivers Busch, Suárez, Hamlin, and Jones in 2018. Preece would go on to win at Bristol.

In 2019, Busch returned for seven races with Hamlin running the Darlington race. Jeffrey Earnhardt was signed to nine races while the rest of the schedule was filled out by development drivers Harrison Burton and Riley Herbst. On August 7, 2019, Earnhardt announced that he parted ways with sponsor and XCI affiliate iK9, as well as Joe Gibbs Racing. Jack Hawksworth would drive the car at Mid-Ohio.

Riley Herbst (2020)

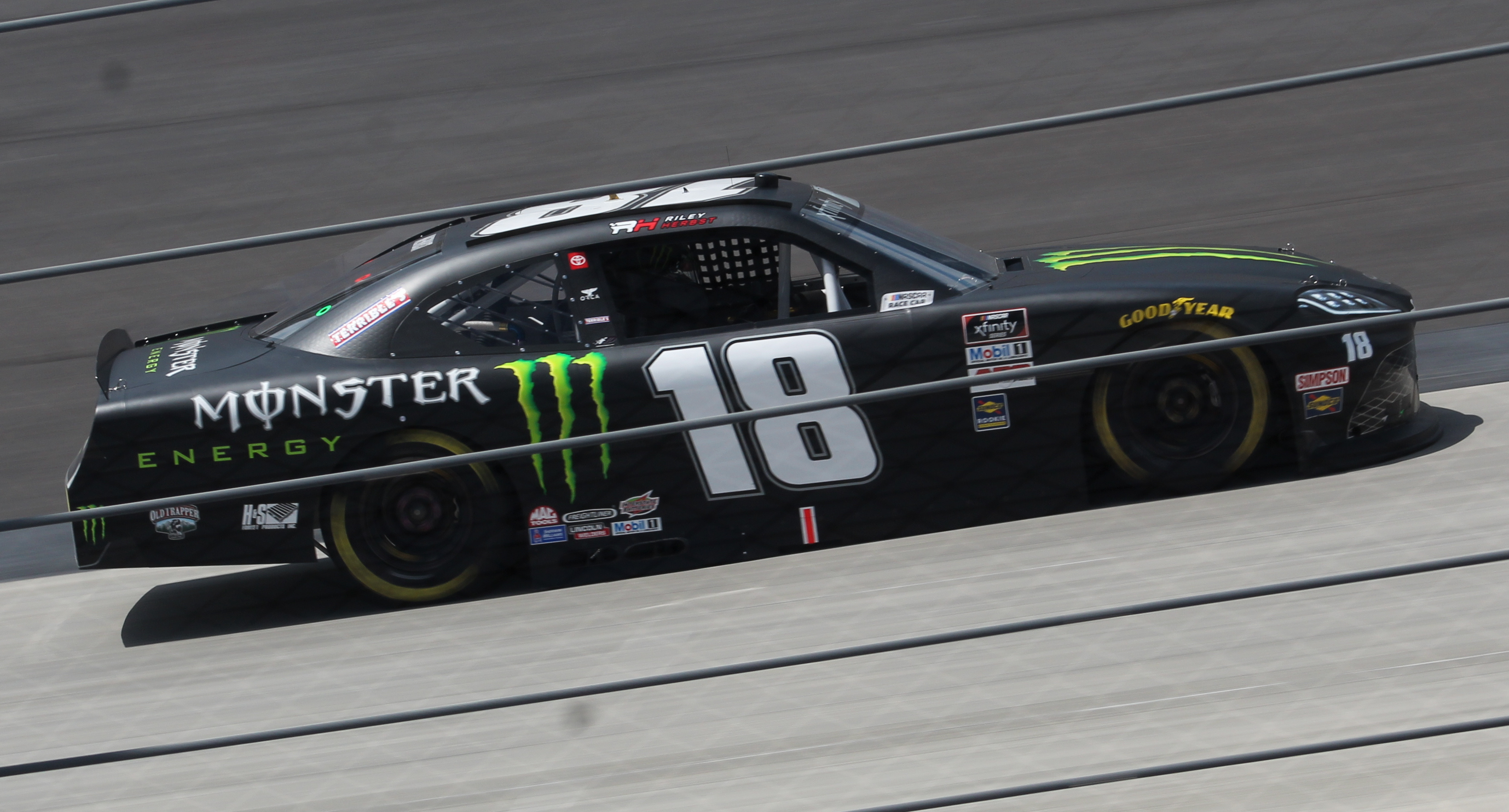
Riley Herbst at Dover International Speedway in 2020

For 2020, Riley Herbst will be driving this car full-time. Dave Rogers will serve as crew chief. He qualified for the playoffs but was eliminated following the first round and ultimately finished 12th in the standings.

Daniel Hemric (2021)

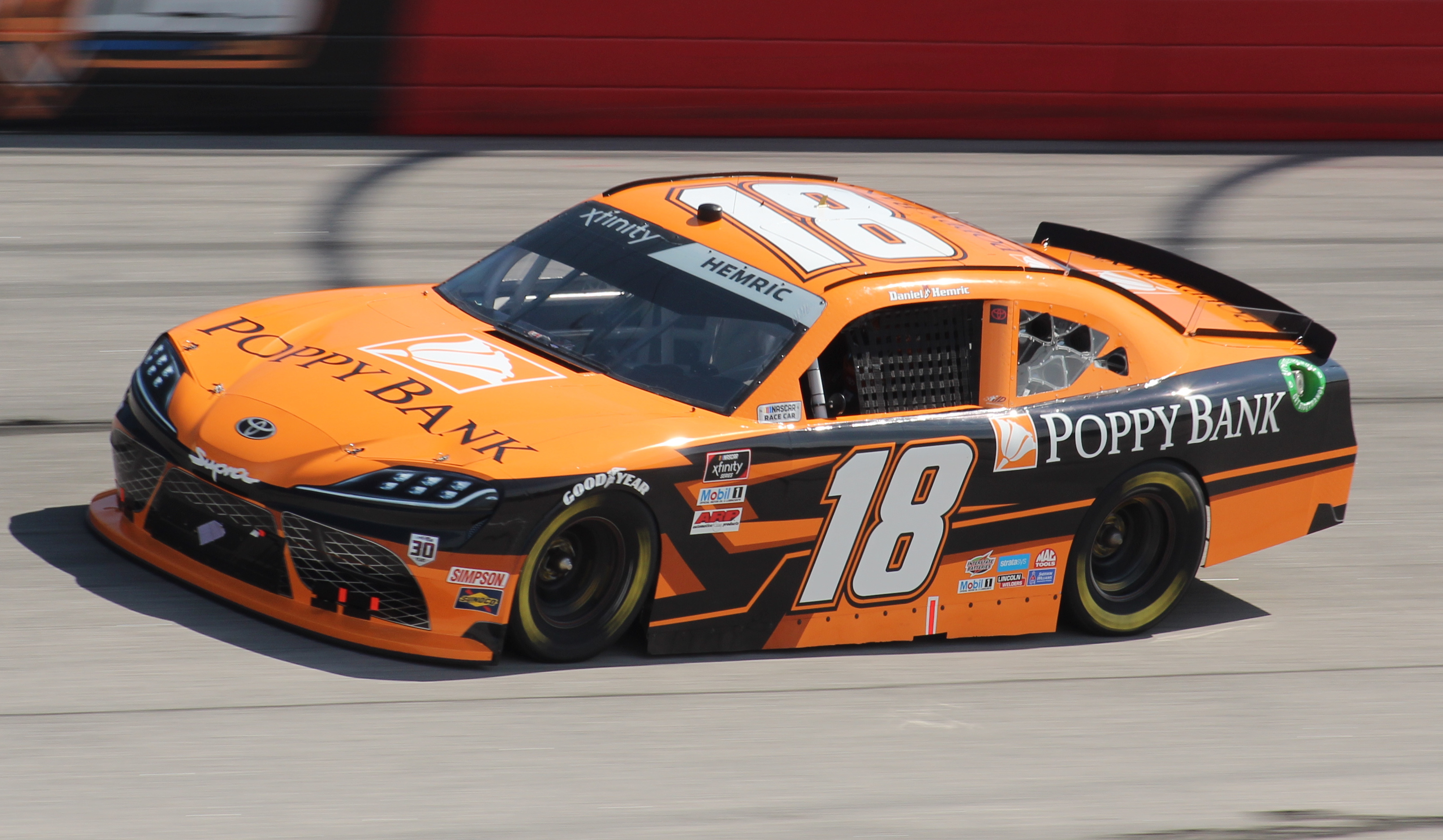
Daniel Hemric at Darlington Raceway in 2021

On November 12, 2020, it was confirmed that Daniel Hemric would replace Riley Herbst for the 2021 season. On September 25, 2021, it was confirmed that Hemric would not be returning to the team after the 2021 season, moving to Kaulig Racing's No. 11 in 2022 as the replacement for Justin Haley's Xfinity seat. Despite being winless during the regular season, Hemric used his consistency to advance to the Championship 4 at Phoenix where he finally won his first career Xfinity race as well as the Championship.

Multiple drivers (2022)

In 2022, JGR downsized to three teams including the No. 18, No. 19, and No. 54. Drivers such as Drew Dollar, Trevor Bayne, Ryan Truex, John Hunter Nemechek, and Sammy Smith drove the No. 18. The team would go winless in 2022.

Sammy Smith (2023)

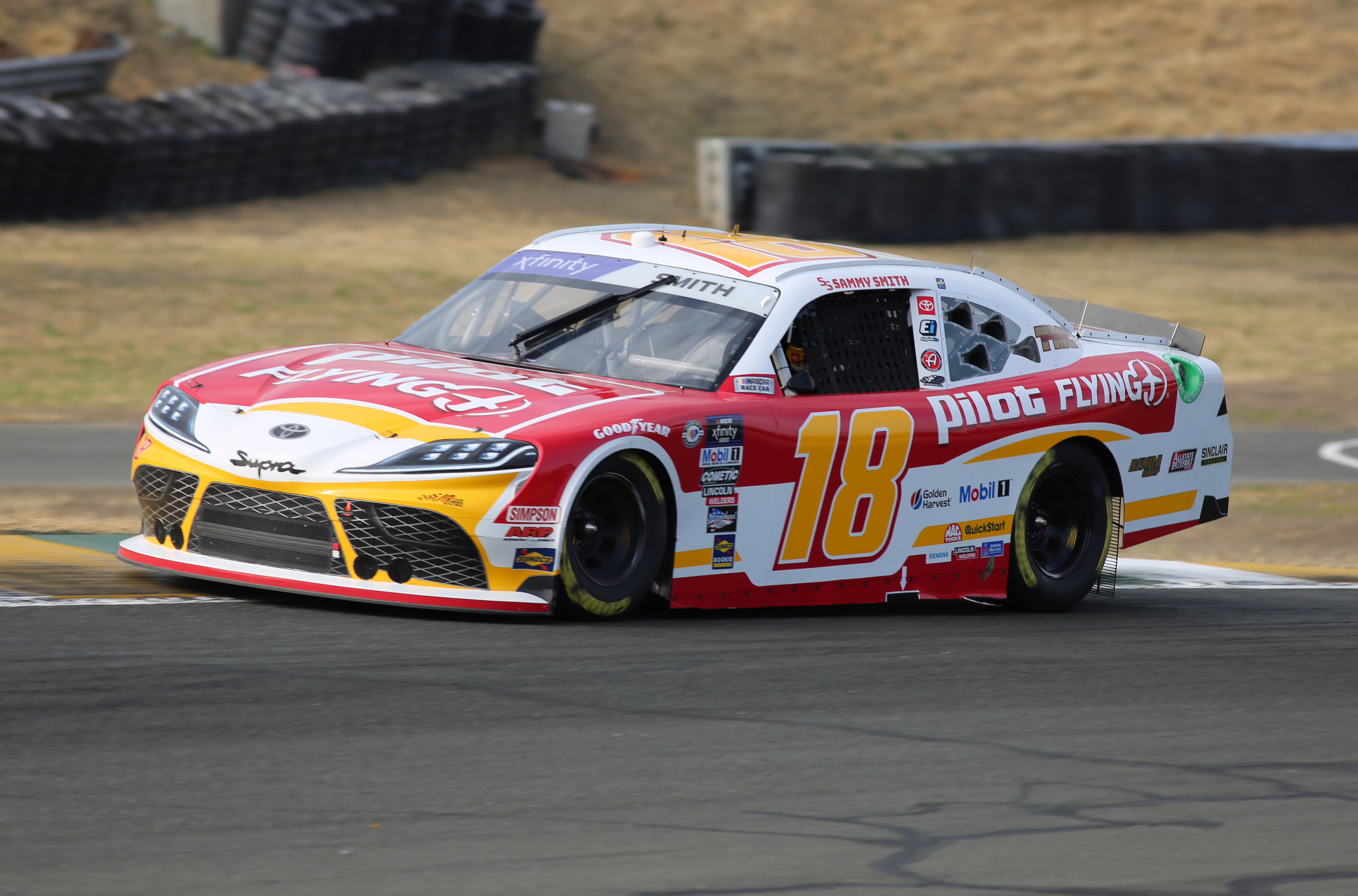
Sammy Smith at Sonoma Raceway in 2023

On December 6, 2022, Joe Gibbs Racing announced that Sammy Smith would drive the No. 18 full-time in 2023 with sponsorship from Pilot Flying J. During the season, Smith scored his first win at Phoenix; at age 18, he became the youngest Xfinity Series winner in series history up to that point. Smith finished 6th in points at seasons end.

Sheldon Creed (2024)

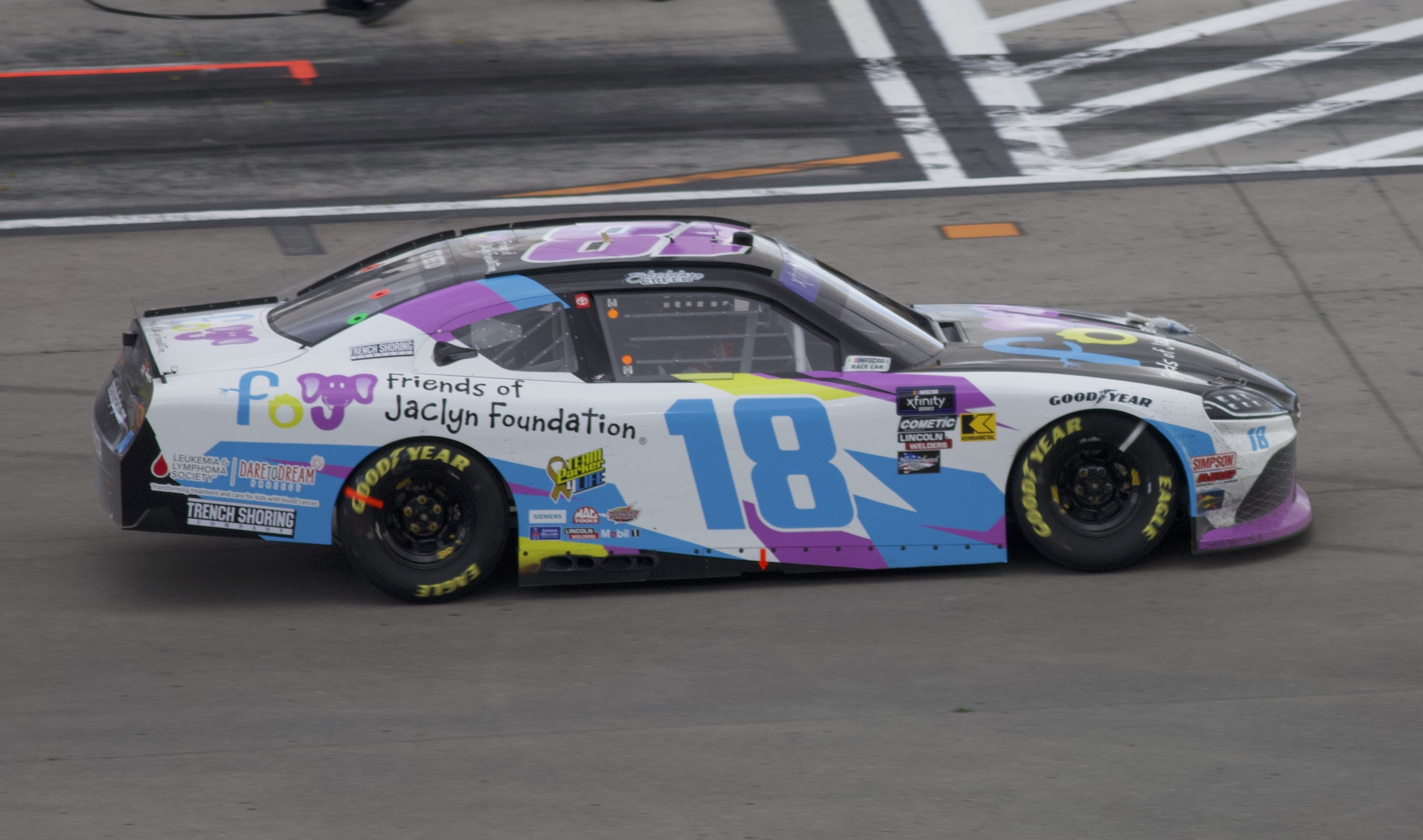
Sheldon Creed's No. 18 car at Las Vegas Motor Speedway in 2024.

On December 13, 2023, it was announced that Sheldon Creed would run the No. 18 full-time for 2024. Creed would garner 16 top-fives and 23 top-tens and finished 6th in points, however he was not able to capture a win despite finishing runner up an astounding six times. Creed would not return to the team for 2025.

William Sawalich (2025–present)

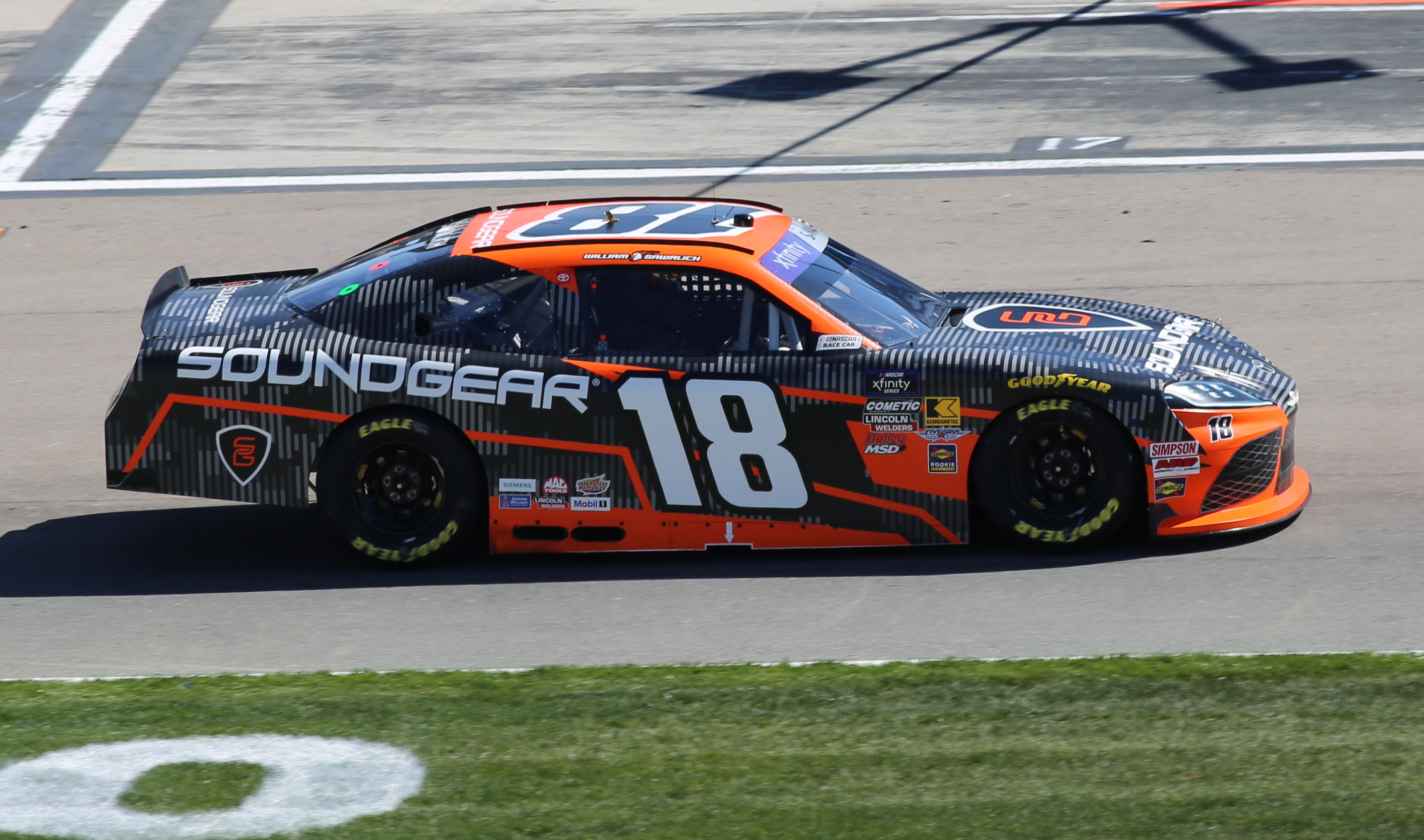
William Sawalich in the No. 18 car at Las Vegas Motor Speedway in 2025

On October 21, 2024, it was announced that 2 time ARCA Menards Series East champion William Sawalich will run full-time for the 2025 season. Sawalich started the season with a 28th-place DNF at Daytona. Throughout the year, he earned top-ten finishes at Atlanta, COTA, Mexico City, Sonoma, Dover, Indianapolis, and Charlotte Roval. Sawalich would earn his second career pole at Nashville. His best finish of the season came at Portland and Gateway, finishing second. During the Talladega fall race, Sawalich was involved in a multi-car wreck during the second stage with Connor Mosack and Dean Thompson, causing him to stay in a nearby hospital overnight. He would later miss the following race at Martinsville Speedway due to concussion-like symptoms, and would be replaced by Justin Bonsignore. It has also been announced that Sawalich would also miss the final race in the NASCAR Xfinity Series season at Phoenix Raceway. He would be replaced once again by Bonsignore.

On January 6, 2026, it was announced that Sawalich would be retained by JGR for the 2026 season. He started the season with a 26th-place DNF at Daytona. He won his first career race at Rockingham.

==== Car No. 18 results ====
Year	Driver	No.	Make	1	2	3	4	5	6	7	8	9	10	11	12	13	14	15	16	17	18	19	20	21	22	23	24	25	26	27	28	29	30	31	32	33	34	35	Owners	Pts	Ref
1997	Bobby Labonte	18	Pontiac	DAY	CAR	RCH	ATL	LVS	DAR	HCY	TEX	BRI	NSV	TAL	NHA	NZH	CLT	DOV	SBO	GLN	MLW	MYB	GTY	IRP	MCH	BRI	DAR	RCH	DOV	CLT; 9	CAL	CAR	HOM								
1999	Andy Hillenburg	18	Pontiac	DAY; 3																																					
1999	J. D. Gibbs	18	Pontiac		CAR; 41		ATL; DNQ			NSV; DNQ	BRI	TAL	CAL	NHA	RCH	NZH; DNQ	CLT	DOV	SBO	GLN	MLW	MYB	PPR	GTY																	
1999	Bobby Labonte	18	Pontiac			LVS; 16		DAR; DNQ	TEX																																
1999	Jason Leffler	18	Pontiac																						IRP; 41	MCH	BRI	DAR	RCH; 22	DOV; DNQ	CLT	CAR; 24	MEM; 20	PHO	HOM						
2000	Jason Leffler	18	Pontiac	DAY; 20	CAR; 19	LVS; 28	ATL; DNQ	DAR; 37	BRI; 25	TEX; 22	NSV; 21	TAL; 28	CAL; 39	RCH; 35	NHA; 24	CLT; 21	DOV; 28	SBO; 32	MYB; 7	GLN; 28	MLW; 15	NZH; 15	PPR; 24	GTY; 15	IRP; 4	MCH; 41	BRI; 36	DAR; 28	RCH; 15	DOV; 10	CLT; 36	CAR; 30	MEM; 16	PHO; 2	HOM; 12						
2001	Jeff Purvis	18	Pontiac	DAY; 28*	CAR; 6	LVS; 17	ATL; 6	DAR; 10	BRI; 24	TEX; 12	NSH; 14	TAL; 24	CAL; 2	RCH; 17	NHA; 19	NZH; 12	CLT; 10	DOV; 14	KEN; 29	MLW; 7																					
2001	Mike McLaughlin	18	Pontiac																		GLN; 17	CHI; 25	GTY; 12	PPR; 14	IRP; 23	MCH; 5	BRI; 16	DAR; 3	RCH; 32	DOV; 31	KAN; 10	CLT; 19	MEM; 10	PHO; 31	CAR; 3	HOM; 12					
2002	Mike McLaughlin	18	Pontiac	DAY; 38	CAR; 5	LVS; 12	DAR; 6	BRI; 2	TEX; 18	NSH; 20		CAL; 6	RCH; 14	NHA; 5	NZH; 9	CLT; 4	DOV; 8	NSH; 33	KEN; 39	MLW; 8	DAY; 7	CHI; 27	GTY; 7	PPR; 7	IRP; 14	MCH; 17	BRI; 4	DAR; 8	RCH; 19	DOV; 2	KAN; 31	CLT; 8	MEM; 16	ATL; 3	CAR; 13	PHO; 19	HOM; 20		4th	4253	
2002	Mike McLaughlin	18	Chevy								TAL; 24																												4th	4253	
2003	Coy Gibbs	18	Pontiac	DAY; 39						TAL; 9											DAY; 17																		14th	3213	
2003	Coy Gibbs	18	Chevy		CAR; 14	LVS; 16	DAR; 14	BRI; 27	TEX; 10		NSH; 30	CAL; 13	RCH; 24	GTY; 36	NZH; 21	CLT; 24	DOV; 25	NSH; 31	KEN; 15	MLW; 24		CHI; 20	NHA; 19	PPR; 17	IRP; 25	MCH; 37	BRI; 22	DAR; 23	RCH; 20	DOV; 18	KAN; 21	CLT; 26	MEM; 25	ATL; 25	PHO; 28	CAR; 33	HOM; 31		14th	3213	
2004	J. J. Yeley	18	Chevy	DAY	CAR	LVS; 23	DAR	BRI	TEX; 42	NSH; 19	TAL	CAL; 23	GTY; 16	RCH; 23	NZH	CLT; DNQ	DOV; 26	NSH; 8	KEN; 11	MLW	DAY	CHI; 9	NHA	PPR	IRP	MCH	BRI; 15		RCH; 15	DOV; 35	KAN; 6			ATL; 10	PHO; 15						
2004	Bobby Labonte	18	Chevy																									CAL; 7				CLT; 14	MEM								
2004	Denny Hamlin	18	Chevy																																	DAR; 8	HOM				
2005	J. J. Yeley	18	Chevy	DAY; 20	CAL; 23	MXC; 42	LVS; 18	ATL; 34	NSH; 38	BRI; 21	TEX; 22	PHO; 10	TAL; 38	DAR; 20	RCH; 24	CLT; 27	DOV; 18	NSH; 8	KEN; 7	MLW; 4	DAY; 42	CHI; 18	NHA; 6	PPR; 5	GTY; 9	IRP; 13	GLN; 10	MCH; 5	BRI; 30	CAL; 43	RCH; 19	DOV; 20	KAN; 10	CLT; 22	MEM; 2	TEX; 25	PHO; 10	HOM; 28	11th	3711	
2006	J. J. Yeley	18	Chevy	DAY; 8	CAL; 7	MXC; 4	LVS; 8	ATL; 5	BRI; 29	TEX; 42	NSH; 4	PHO; 11	TAL; 34	RCH; 31	DAR; 9	CLT; 3	DOV; 9	NSH; 16	KEN; 2	MLW; 3	DAY; 4	CHI; 10	NHA; 8	MAR; 9	GTY; 37	IRP; 3	GLN; 11	MCH; 9	BRI; 12	CAL; 40	RCH; 13	DOV; 9	KAN; 11	CLT; 32	MEM; 10	TEX; 6	PHO; 6	HOM; 5	5th	4487	
2007	Aric Almirola	18	Chevy	DAY; 19				ATL; 27				PHO; 43			DAR; 41	CLT; 14							CHI; 38											CLT; 4				HOM; 18	21st	3475	
2007	Tony Stewart	18	Chevy		CAL; 11																	DAY; 4														TEX; 7*			21st	3475	
2007	Brad Coleman	18	Chevy			MXC; 38	LVS; 35			NSH; 15	TEX; 16		TAL; 9	RCH; 27					KEN; 2	MLW; 4				GTY; 27	IRP; 31	CGV; 8	GLN; 5	MCH; 15	BRI; 17			DOV; 42			MEM; 33		PHO; 16		21st	3475	
2007	Kevin Conway	18	Chevy						BRI; 26								DOV; 30	NSH; 31			NHA; 21									CAL; 20	RCH; 43		KAN; 35						21st	3475	
2008	Kyle Busch	18	Toyota	DAY; 2*	CAL	LVS; 31	ATL	BRI	NSH	TEX; 1*	PHO; 1*	MXC	TAL; 16	RCH					KEN; 30*	MLW	NHA; 3	DAY; 2	CHI; 1*	GTY	IRP; 1*	CGV	GLN		BRI; 7	CAL; 1*		DOV; 1*		CLT; 1*		TEX; 1*		HOM; 2*			
2008	Denny Hamlin	18	Toyota												DAR; DNQ	CLT	DOV; 1*	NSH													RCH; 4		KAN; 1*				PHO; 2				
2008	Joey Logano	18	Toyota																									MCH; 7													
2008	Marc Davis	18	Toyota																																MEM; 23						
2009	Kyle Busch	18	Toyota	DAY; 4	CAL; 1*	LVS; 39	BRI; 6*	TEX; 1*	NSH; 2	PHO; 10	TAL; 10*	RCH; 1*	DAR; 16*	CLT; 3*	DOV; 17*	NSH; 1*	KEN; 2*	MLW; 2*	NHA; 1	DAY; 2	CHI; 2	GTY; 1	IRP; 2	IOW; 2	GLN; 2	MCH; 3	BRI; 28	CGV; 10	ATL; 2	RCH; 3	DOV; 4*	KAN; 2*	CAL; 31*	CLT; 1*	MEM; 2	TEX; 1*	PHO; 9	HOM; 1*	1st	5682	
2010	Kyle Busch	18	Toyota	DAY; 18	CAL; 1	LVS; 16	BRI; 3	NSH; 3	PHO; 1*	TEX; 1*	TAL; 34	RCH; 4	DAR; 2	DOV; 1*	CLT; 1				NHA; 1*	DAY; 7	CHI; 1*		IRP; 1*	IOW; 1*	GLN; 5	MCH; 3	BRI; 1*		ATL; 2*	RCH; 9	DOV; 1*	KAN; 3*	CAL; 1	CLT; 6		TEX; 2*	PHO; 16	HOM; 1*			
2010	Brad Coleman	18	Toyota													NSH; 6	KEN; 13	ROA; 6				GTY; 30						CGV; 12							GTY; 8						
2011	Kyle Busch	18	Toyota	DAY; 7	PHO; 1**	LVS; 30*	BRI; 1*	CAL; 1	TEX; 34	TAL; 1	NSH; 2		DAR; 1*	DOV; 2		CLT; 3		MCH; 3		DAY; 4	KEN; 3	NHA; 1				GLN; 4*		BRI; 1*	ATL; 2	RCH; 1				CLT; 2	TEX; QL^{†}						
2011	Kelly Bires	18	Toyota									RCH; 30					CHI; 8																								
2011	Michael McDowell	18	Toyota												IOW; 7				ROA; 12					IRP; 10	IOW; 9		CGV; 3														
2011	Drew Herring	18	Toyota																				NSH; 7																		
2011	Joey Logano	18	Toyota																												CHI; 19	DOV; 13	KAN; 7			PHO; 4					
2011	Denny Hamlin	18	Toyota																																TEX; 2		HOM; 5				
2012	Denny Hamlin	18	Toyota	DAY; 32	PHO; 9				TEX; 4	RCH; 2		DAR; 2		CLT; 2				KEN; 33				IND; 4					ATL; 12	RCH; 4				CLT; 5		TEX; 5					1st	1274	
2012	Mark Martin	18	Toyota			LVS; 2																																	1st	1274	
2012	Joey Logano	18	Toyota				BRI; 4*	CAL; 1*			TAL; 1				DOV; 1*	MCH; 1			DAY; 5					GLN; 22		BRI; 1			CHI; 9*		DOV; 1*		KAN; 3		PHO; 1*	HOM; 16			1st	1274	
2012	Michael McDowell	18	Toyota										IOW; 3				ROA; 2						IOW; 6		CGV; 6														1st	1274	
2012	Ryan Truex	18	Toyota																	NHA; 10	CHI; 10																		1st	1274	
2012	Drew Herring	18	Toyota																							BRI; 36													1st	1274	
2013	Matt Kenseth	18	Toyota	DAY; 16	PHO; 8	LVS	BRI	CAL	TEX; 6	RCH	TAL	DAR; 5	CLT; 8	DOV; 3	IOW	MCH			DAY; 1	NHA; 9	CHI	IND; 7	IOW	GLN				RCH; 35	CHI; 7			KAN; 1	CLT; 5	TEX; 4	PHO; 6	HOM; 4			22nd	682	
2013	Michael McDowell	18	Toyota														ROA; 34	KEN							MOH; 2														22nd	682	
2013	Drew Herring	18	Toyota																							BRI; 36	ATL												22nd	682	
2013	Joey Coulter	18	Toyota																											KEN; 18	DOV								22nd	682	
2015	Daniel Suárez	18	Toyota	DAY; 39	ATL; 14	LVS; 10	PHO; 11	CAL; 13	TEX; 18	BRI; 2	RCH; 6	TAL; 31	IOW; 18	CLT; 6	DOV; 19	MCH; 20	CHI; 7	DAY; 15	KEN; 4	NHA; 5	IND; 3	IOW; 6	GLN; 15	MOH; 11	BRI; 5	ROA; 24	DAR; 3	RCH; 12	CHI; 6	KEN; 22	DOV; 10	CLT; 4	KAN; 9	TEX; 6	PHO; 4	HOM; 6			9th	1078	
2016	Bobby Labonte	18	Toyota	DAY; 23																																			4th	4016	
2016	Kyle Busch	18	Toyota		ATL; 1*	LVS; 1*	PHO; 1*	CAL; 2*	TEX; 1*	BRI; 2					POC; 4	MCH; 2*			KEN; 1*	NHA; 1*	IND; 1*		GLN; 37		BRI; 24			RCH; 1*	CHI; 13*		DOV; QL^{‡}		KAN; 1*		PHO; 1*				4th	4016	
2016	Matt Tifft	18	Toyota								RCH; 33	TAL; 8	DOV; 8																	KEN; 5		CLT; 8		TEX; 9		HOM; 25			4th	4016	
2016	Denny Hamlin	18	Toyota											CLT; 1*													DAR; 2												4th	4016	
2016	Sam Hornish Jr.	18	Toyota														IOW; 1*																						4th	4016	
2016	David Ragan	18	Toyota															DAY; 21																					4th	4016	
2016	Dakoda Armstrong	18	Toyota																			IOW; 5																	4th	4016	
2016	Owen Kelly	18	Toyota																					MOH; 16		ROA; 17													4th	4016	
2016	Drew Herring	18	Toyota																												DOV; 21								4th	4016	
2017	Daniel Suárez	18	Toyota	DAY; 34			PHO; 39		TEX; 12	BRI; 3	RCH; 21	TAL; 9		DOV; 3	POC; 5			DAY; 39											CHI; 19		DOV; 7	CLT; 8*							3rd	4032	
2017	Kyle Busch	18	Toyota		ATL; 1	LVS; 7		CAL; 3								MCH; 5			KEN; 1	NHA; 1	IND; 12*		GLN; 1*		BRI; 1*			RCH; 2*											3rd	4032	
2017	Christopher Bell	18	Toyota										CLT; 4													ROA; 19							KAN; 1	TEX; 6	PHO; 4				3rd	4032	
2017	Kyle Benjamin	18	Toyota														IOW; 31					IOW; 2								KEN; 12									3rd	4032	
2017	Regan Smith	18	Toyota																					MOH; 28															3rd	4032	
2017	Denny Hamlin	18	Toyota																								DAR; 1												3rd	4032	
2017	Ryan Preece	18	Toyota																																	HOM; 5			3rd	4032	
2018	Daniel Suárez	18	Toyota	DAY; 8														CHI; 4																					9th	2227	
2018	Kyle Benjamin	18	Toyota		ATL; 8																		IOW; 3		MOH; 13														9th	2227	
2018	Kyle Busch	18	Toyota			LVS; 14	PHO; 3							CLT; 8*	POC; 1*	MCH; 6				KEN; 3*					BRI; 36														9th	2227	
2018	Ryan Preece	18	Toyota					CAL; 9	TEX; 5	BRI; 1									DAY; 39		NHA; 3		GLN; 4					IND; 28	LVS; 6	RCH; 18	ROV; 4	DOV; 4	KAN; 21	TEX; 31	PHO; 5	HOM; 6			9th	2227	
2018	Noah Gragson	18	Toyota								RCH; 2	TAL; 4	DOV; 7																										9th	2227	
2018	Riley Herbst	18	Toyota														IOW; 6																						9th	2227	
2018	James Davison	18	Toyota																							ROA; 8													9th	2227	
2018	Denny Hamlin	18	Toyota																								DAR; 4												9th	2227	
2019	Jeffrey Earnhardt	18	Toyota	DAY; 15	ATL; 6							TAL; 26		CLT; 3	POC; 22																								12th	2132	
2019	Kyle Busch	18	Toyota			LVS; 1*	PHO; 1*	CAL; 2*	TEX; 1														GLN; 31		BRI; 29*			IND; 1*											12th	2132	
2019	Harrison Burton	18	Toyota							BRI; 10							IOW; 4				NHA; 29									RCH; 6	CLT; 13	DOV; 38	KAN; 34	TEX; 7		HOM; 10			12th	2132	
2019	Riley Herbst	18	Toyota								RCH; 9		DOV; 15			MCH; 37		CHI; 10	DAY; 18	KEN; 11		IOW; 13							LVS; 9						PHO; 30				12th	2132	
2019	Jack Hawksworth	18	Toyota																					MOH; 15															12th	2132	
2019	Matt DiBenedetto	18	Toyota																							ROA; 27*													12th	2132	
2019	Denny Hamlin	18	Toyota																								DAR; 38												12th	2132	
2020	Riley Herbst	18	Toyota	DAY; 32	LVS; 9	CAL; 2	PHO; 10	DAR; 18	CLT; 12	BRI; 27	ATL; 17	HOM; 10	HOM; 9	TAL; 37	POC; 9	IRC; 33	KEN; 2	KEN; 10	TEX; 36	KAN; 9	ROA; 23	DRC; 7	DOV; 6	DOV; 9	DAY; 4	DAR; 4	RCH; 10	RCH; 34	BRI; 10	LVS; 12	TAL; 35	ROV; 12	KAN; 30	TEX; 32	MAR; 6	PHO; 11			12th	2151	
2021	Daniel Hemric	18	Toyota	DAY; 9	DRC; 3	HOM; 3	LVS; 2*	PHO; 23	ATL; 9	MAR; 3	TAL; 12	DAR; 5	DOV; 9	COA; 29	CLT; 28*	MOH; 12	TEX; 4	NSH; 13	POC; 6	ROA; 2	ATL; 30	NHA; 3	GLN; 22	IRC; 12	MCH; 39	DAY; 5	DAR; 24	RCH; 6	BRI; 10	LVS; 5	TAL; 4	ROV; 3	TEX; 2	KAN; 15	MAR; 3	PHO; 1			5th	4040	
2022	Drew Dollar	18	Toyota	DAY; 36								TAL; 13																											7th	2247	
2022	Trevor Bayne	18	Toyota		CAL; 3		PHO; 4	ATL; 28								CLT; 9		NSH; 2			NHA; 2										TAL; 13		LVS; 5	HOM; 6					7th	2247	
2022	Ryan Truex	18	Toyota			LVS; 30					MAR; 7			DAR; 30	TEX; 6					ATL; 3																			7th	2247	
2022	Bubba Wallace	18	Toyota						COA; 28																IRC; 35														7th	2247	
2022	John Hunter Nemechek	18	Toyota							RCH; 2*			DOV; 37																	TEX; 28									7th	2247	
2022	Connor Mosack	18	Toyota														PIR; 28																						7th	2247	
2022	Sammy Smith	18	Toyota																ROA; 24			POC; 31		MCH; 12	GLN; 3	DAY; 38		KAN; 8	BRI; 14						MAR; 18	PHO; 10			7th	2247	
2022	Christopher Bell	18	Toyota																								DAR; 7												7th	2247	
2022	James Davison	18	Toyota																													CLT; 4							7th	2247	
2023	Sammy Smith	18	Toyota	DAY; 19	CAL; 19	LVS; 17	PHO; 1*	ATL; 17	COA; 4	RCH; 19	MAR; 2	TAL; 33	DOV; 6	DAR; 11	CLT; 10	PIR; 30	SON; 9	NSH; 34	CSC; 6	ATL; 10	NHA; 5	POC; 6	ROA; 31	MCH; 38	IRC; 28	GLN; 18	DAY; 21	DAR; 17	KAN; 35	BRI; 9	TEX; 3	ROV; 11	LVS; 17	HOM; 9	MAR; 3*	PHO; 9			6th	2248	
2024	Sheldon Creed	18	Toyota	DAY; 2	ATL; 4	LVS; 26	PHO; 3	COA; 32	RCH; 35	MAR; 6	TEX; 19	TAL; 6	DOV; 4	DAR; 9	CLT; 36	PIR; 13	SON; 2	IOW; 5	NHA; 2	NSH; 33	CSC; 26	POC; 4	IND; 5	MCH; 2	DAY; 8	DAR; 3	ATL; 25	GLN; 2	BRI; 2	KAN; 5	TAL; 5	ROV; 35	LVS; 9	HOM; 5	MAR; 6	PHO; 7			6th	2264	
2025	William Sawalich	18	Toyota	DAY; 28	ATL; 9	COA; 9	PHO; 13	LVS; 38	HOM; 24	MAR; 27	DAR; 35	BRI; 34	CAR; 25	TAL; 37	TEX; 13	CLT; 15	NSH; 35	MXC; 6	POC; 21	ATL; 36	CSC; 37	SON; 3	DOV; 9	IND; 6	IOW; 11	GLN; 26	DAY; 12	PIR; 2	GTW; 2	BRI; 15	KAN; 11	ROV; 7	LVS; 12	TAL; 30					17th	690	
2025	Justin Bonsignore	18	Toyota																																MAR; 10	PHO; 10			17th	690	
2026	William Sawalich	18	Toyota	DAY; 26	ATL; 23	COA; 7	PHO; 37	LVS; 9	DAR; 17	MAR; 20	ROC; 1	BRI; 7	KAN; 20	TAL; 28	TEX; 15	GLN; 36	DOV; 4	CLT; 4	NSH; 3	POC; 21	COR; 36	SON; 13	CHI; 29	ATL; 4	IND; 5	IOW; 3	DAY; 37	DAR; 30	GTW; 16	BRI; 2	LVS; 8	CLT; 11	PHO; 8	TAL; 29	MAR; 8	HOM; 10			14th	838	

=== Car No. 19 history ===
Part-time (2004–2006)

The No. 19 team was to make its debut at the 2004 Michigan race driven by Bobby Labonte and sponsored by Banquet Foods, however, qualifying was rained out and the team with no owner's points missed the race. The team finally made its first start in 2005 CarQuest Auto Parts 300. Labonte ran seven races that year, with three top-tens. With Labonte moving to Petty Enterprises, JGR development driver Aric Almirola ran the car in seven races in 2006. Tony Stewart also drove the car at select races in 2006, using his Nextel Cup crew when he raced. The No. 19 team was disbanded after the 2006 season.

Daniel Suárez (2016)

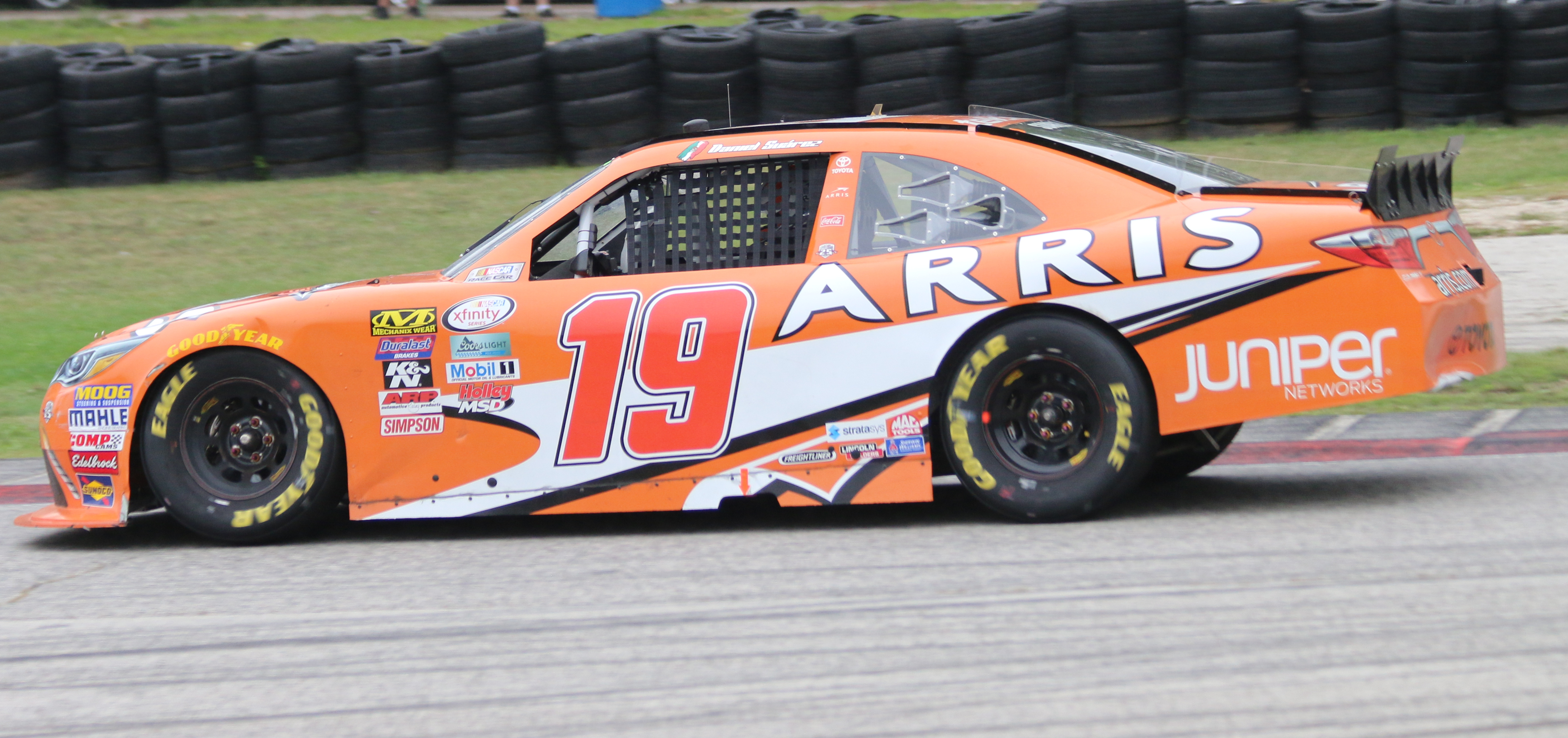
Daniel Suárez won the 2016 Xfinity Series championship.

The No. 19 car was returned for 2016 with Daniel Suárez and sponsor Arris moving from the No. 18 team, maintaining the same sponsor-number combination used by Carl Edwards in the Cup Series. Suárez got his first win at Michigan after a last lap pass to Kyle Busch. Suárez scored three victories and won the 2016 championship, becoming the first foreign-born driver to win a NASCAR National championship.

Matt Tifft (2017)

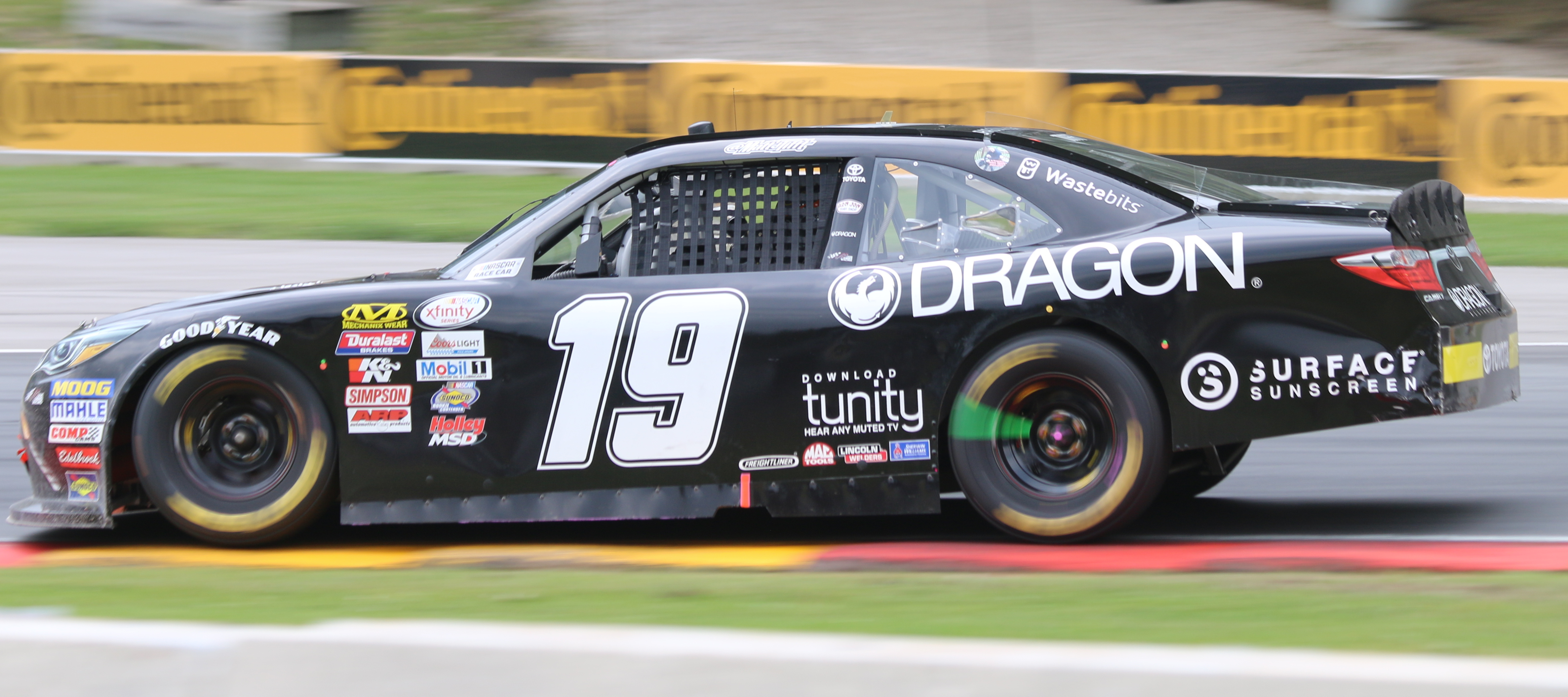
Tifft's No. 19 Xfinity Series car at Road America in 2017

It was announced that in 2017, Matt Tifft would drive full-time in the No. 19, with rookie crew chief Matt Beckham on the box. Tifft struggled to repeat the success of Suárez failing to win any races and finishing 7th in points.

Brandon Jones (2018–2022)

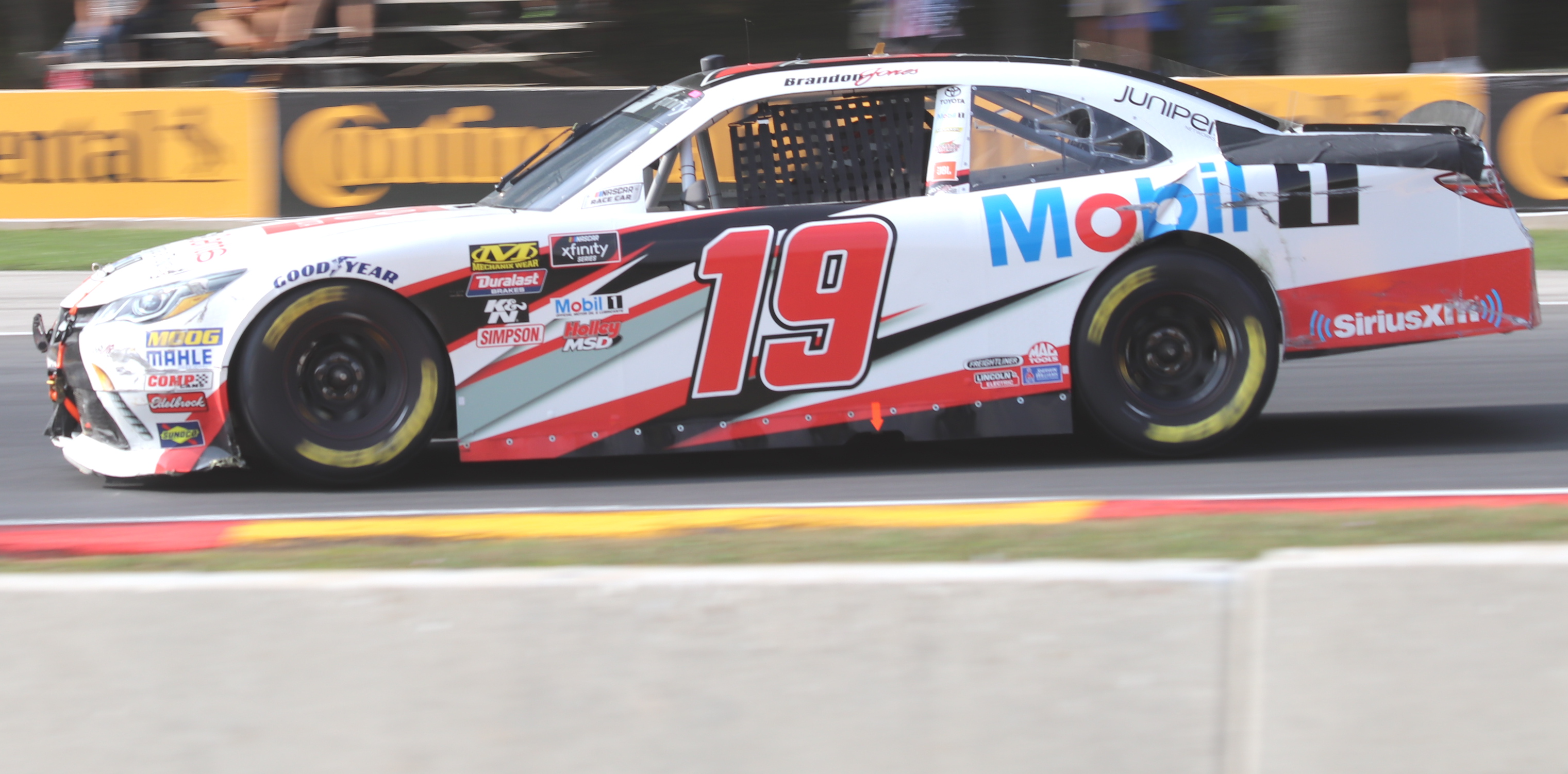
Jones' No. 19 at Road America in 2018

On November 15, 2017, JGR announced that Brandon Jones would replace Tifft in the No. 19 in 2018. Tifft would move to Richard Childress Racing in a driver swap. Chris Gabehart was announced as his crew chief, moving from the No. 20 Xfinity team and replacing Matt Beckham. From 2018 to 2022, Jones score five wins and made the top-10 in the playoffs. On September 14, 2022, Jones announced he would leave JGR at the end of the 2022 season and move to the JR Motorsports No. 9 in 2023.

Multiple drivers (2023–2025)

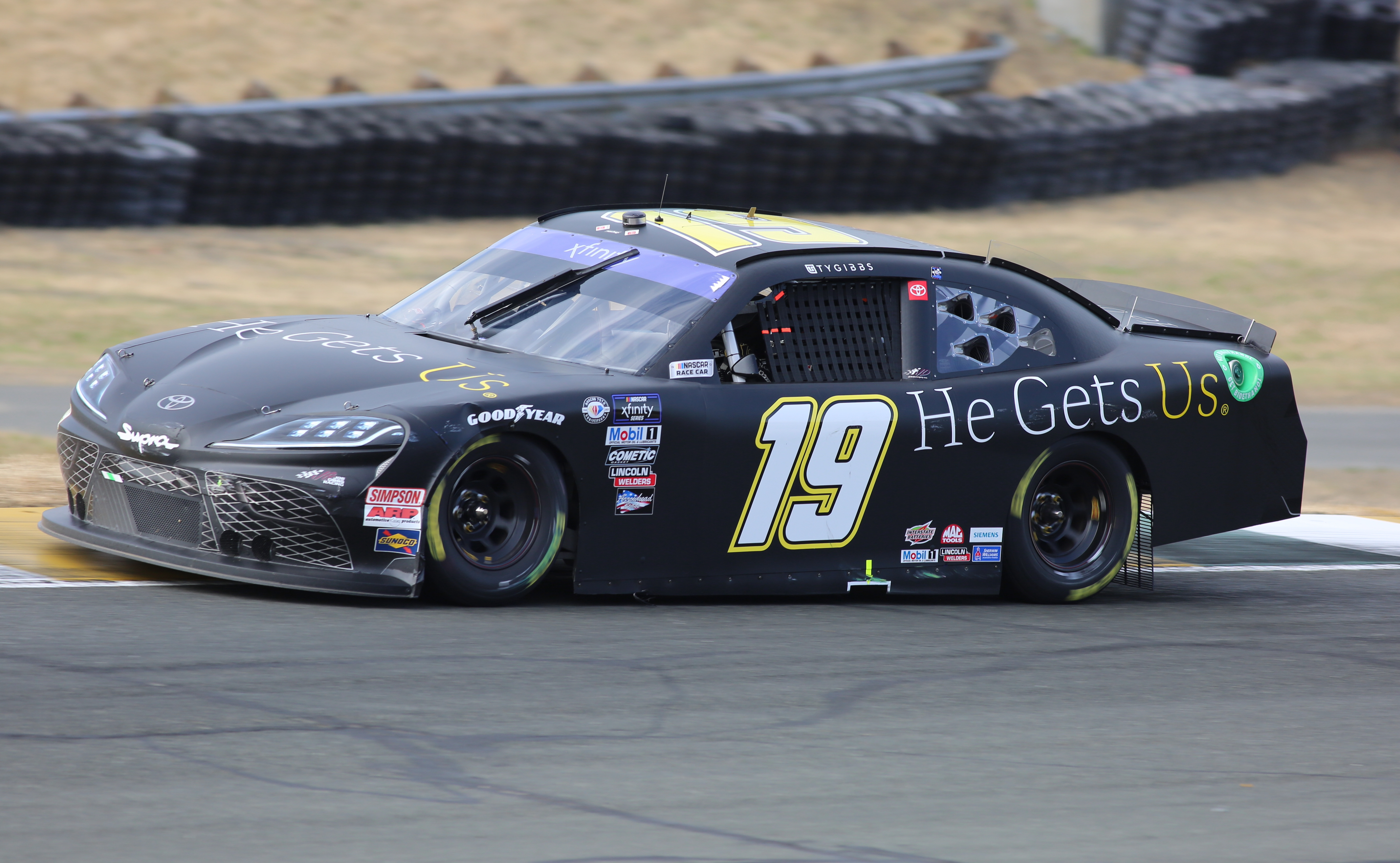
Gibbs's No. 19 at Sonoma in 2023.

On December 8, 2022, Joe Gibbs Racing announced that the No. 19 would run full time with a number of drivers, including Ryan Truex and Joe Graf Jr.. Truex scored his first career win at Dover. Ty Gibbs took the No. 19 to victory lane at Indianapolis. Denny Hamlin won his sole Xfinity race of 2023 at Darlington.

For the 2024 season, the No. 19 was shared between Ryan Truex, Aric Almirola, Ty Gibbs, Taylor Gray, Joe Graf Jr., and William Sawalich. The team placed in the top 10 six times and finished 15th in owners' points.

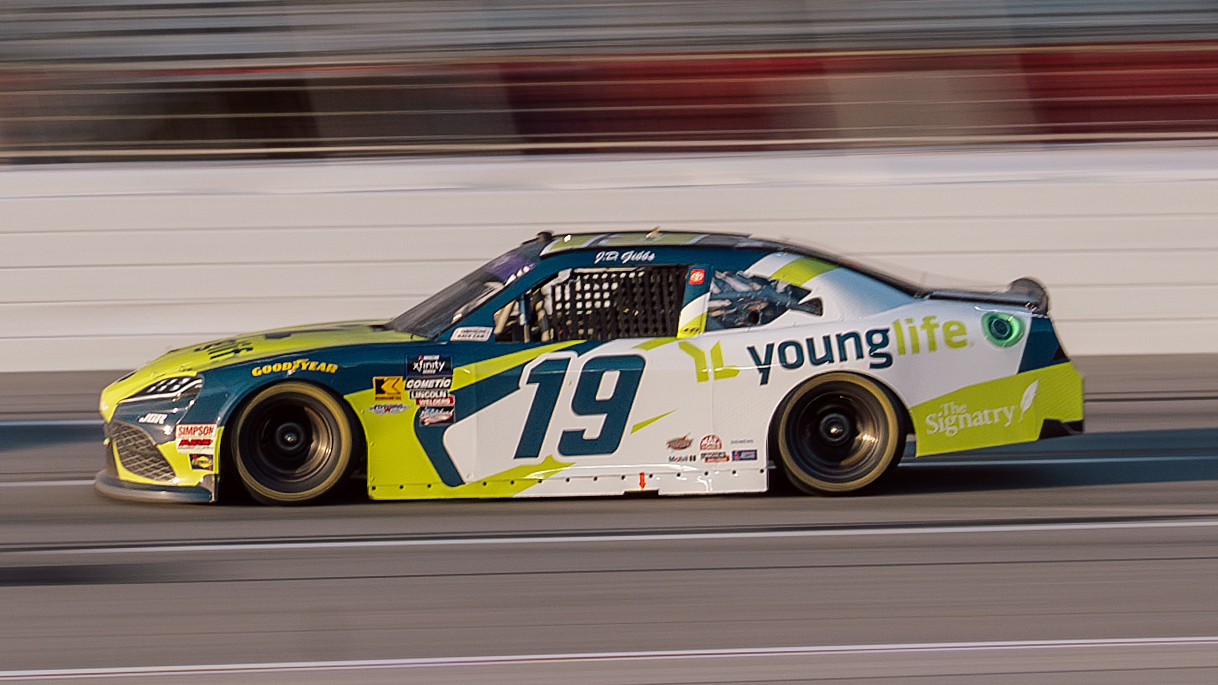
Almirola's No. 19 car at Atlanta Motor Speedway in 2025

In 2025 season, the No. 19 was shared between Justin Bonsignore, Riley Herbst, Christopher Bell, and Chase Briscoe. Almirola returned to the team, with a 9 race schedule. Supercars racer Jack Perkins made his Xfinity Series debut at Portland. During the playoffs, Almirola won at Bristol and Las Vegas. With Almirola finishing second at Phoenix, the No. 19 car ended the season with the owners' championship.

Brent Crews (2026)

On November 24, 2025, it was announced that Brent Crews would drive the No. 19 Toyota for nearly full-time in 2026. Due to his age, he would sit out for four races early in the year before remaining in the car for the rest of the season beginning at Martinsville. On February 4, 2026, it was announced that Gio Ruggiero would make his debut in the NASCAR O'Reilly Auto Parts Series, running the No. 19 in the season-opener at Daytona and Atlanta. Chase Briscoe would drive the No. 19 at Las Vegas. Christopher Bell would drive the No. 19 at Darlington.

==== Car No. 19 results ====
Year	Driver	No.	Make	1	2	3	4	5	6	7	8	9	10	11	12	13	14	15	16	17	18	19	20	21	22	23	24	25	26	27	28	29	30	31	32	33	34	35	Owners	Pts	Ref
2004	Bobby Labonte	19	Chevy	DAY	CAR	LVS	DAR	BRI	TEX	NSH	TAL	CAL	GTY	RCH	NZH	CLT	DOV	NSH	KEN	MLW	DAY	CHI	NHA	PPR	IRP	MCH; DNQ	BRI	CAL	RCH	DOV	KAN	CLT	MEM	ATL	PHO	DAR	HOM		N/A	0	
2005	Bobby Labonte	19	Chevy	DAY	CAL	MXC	LVS	ATL	NSH	BRI	TEX	PHO	TAL	DAR	RCH	CLT; 6	DOV	NSH	KEN	MLW	DAY	CHI; 16	NHA	PPR	GTY	IRP	GLN	MCH; 7	BRI; 10	CAL	RCH; 8	DOV	KAN; 37	CLT	MEM	TEX; 12	PHO; DNQ	HOM	55th	866	
2006	Aric Almirola	19	Chevy	DAY	CAL	MXC	LVS	ATL	BRI	TEX	NSH	PHO	TAL	RCH; 32	DAR	CLT	DOV; 11	NSH	KEN	MLW	DAY	CHI	NHA	MAR	GTY	IRP	GLN	MCH; 27	BRI; 20	CAL	RCH; 18	DOV	KAN; 39	CLT; 15	MEM				48th	1008	
2006	Tony Stewart	19	Chevy																																	TEX; 2	PHO; 13	HOM	48th	1008	
2016	Daniel Suárez	19	Toyota	DAY; 8	ATL; 7	LVS; 2	PHO; 3	CAL; 4	TEX; 16	BRI; 6	RCH; 4	TAL; 7	DOV; 9	CLT; 12	POC; 9	MCH; 1	IOW; 4	DAY; 32	KEN; 3	NHA; 4	IND; 7	IOW; 30	GLN; 4	MOH; 23	BRI; 30	ROA; 4	DAR; 3	RCH; 8	CHI; 4	KEN; 2	DOV; 1	CLT; 3	KAN; 3	TEX; 5	PHO; 5	HOM; 1*			1st	4040	
2017	Matt Tifft	19	Toyota	DAY; 11	ATL; 12	LVS; 34	PHO; 12	CAL; 17	TEX; 9	BRI; 16	RCH; 14	TAL; 6	CLT; 26	DOV; 9	POC; 10	MCH; 26	IOW; 22	DAY; 18	KEN; 14	NHA; 11	IND; 11	IOW; 19	GLN; 13	MOH; 3	BRI; 17	ROA; 3	DAR; 40	RCH; 13	CHI; 6	KEN; 9	DOV; 6	CLT; 9	KAN; 8	TEX; 8	PHO; 11	HOM; 7			14th	824	
2018	Brandon Jones	19	Toyota	DAY; 10	ATL; 17	LVS; 7	PHO; 11	CAL; 13	TEX; 33	BRI; 6*	RCH; 10	TAL; 2	DOV; 10	CLT; 15	POC; 24	MCH; 18	IOW; 5	CHI; 11	DAY; 12	KEN; 36	NHA; 6	IOW; 12	GLN; 7	MOH; 23	BRI; 29	ROA; 9	DAR; 12	IND; 10	LVS; 7	RCH; 8	ROV; 22	DOV; 6	KAN; 36	TEX; 6	PHO; 7	HOM; 8			10th	2186	
2019	Brandon Jones	19	Toyota	DAY; 3	ATL; 4	LVS; 28	PHO; 7	CAL; 7	TEX; 33	BRI; 14	RCH; 33	TAL; 18	DOV; 7	CLT; 10	POC; 38	MCH; 6	IOW; 11	CHI; 4	DAY; 30	KEN; 30	NHA; 9	IOW; 33	GLN; 17	MOH; 10	BRI; 11	ROA; 16	DAR; 7	IND; 6	LVS; 3	RCH; 11	ROV; 16	DOV; 37	KAN; 1	TEX; 4	PHO; 11	HOM; 8			9th	2206	
2020	Brandon Jones	19	Toyota	DAY; 4	LVS; 6	CAL; 30*	PHO; 1	DAR; 20	CLT; 27	BRI; 3	ATL; 8	HOM; 8	HOM; 2	TAL; 16	POC; 36	IRC; 37	KEN; 36	KEN; 30	TEX; 7	KAN; 1	ROA; 14	DRC; 2	DOV; 16	DOV; 4	DAY; 13	DAR; 1	RCH; 14	RCH; 8	BRI; 8	LVS; 11	TAL; 4	ROV; 10	KAN; 9	TEX; 25	MAR; 9	PHO; 3			6th	2273	
2021	Brandon Jones	19	Toyota	DAY; 38	DRC; 4	HOM; 2	LVS; 3	PHO; 33	ATL; 37	MAR; 5	TAL; 37	DAR; 3	DOV; 35	COA; 17	CLT; 8	MOH; 4	TEX; 5	NSH; 6	POC; 7	ROA; 19	ATL; 39	NHA; 38	GLN; 6	IRC; 36	MCH; 2	DAY; 40	DAR; 33	RCH; 20	BRI; 5	LVS; 6	TAL; 2	ROV; 5	TEX; 10	KAN; 11	MAR; 6	PHO; 7			13th	865	
2022	Brandon Jones	19	Toyota	DAY; 17	CAL; 33	LVS; 10	PHO; 2	ATL; 7	COA; 18	RCH; 13	MAR; 1	TAL; 26	DOV; 7	DAR; 7	TEX; 14	CLT; 16	PIR; 11	NSH; 14	ROA; 5	ATL; 11	NHA; 28	POC; 17	IRC; 15	MCH; 4	GLN; 24	DAY; 20	DAR; 14	KAN; 4	BRI; 2	TEX; 27	TAL; 9	ROV; 7	LVS; 9	HOM; 15	MAR; 23	PHO; 11			9th	2220	
2023	Myatt Snider	19	Toyota	DAY; 5												PIR; 6																ROV; 14	LVS; 11		MAR; 15	PHO; 22			10th	2194	
2023	Joe Graf Jr.	19	Toyota		CAL; 11	LVS; 15				RCH; 37											NHA; 29								KAN; 9					HOM; 10					10th	2194	
2023	Ryan Truex	19	Toyota				PHO; 2	ATL; 3			MAR; 12	TAL; 17	DOV; 1*	DAR; 35																									10th	2194	
2023	Ty Gibbs	19	Toyota						COA; 3						CLT; 5		SON; 4	NSH; 37		ATL; 6				MCH; 4	IRC; 1*	GLN; 17*													10th	2194	
2023	Connor Mosack	19	Toyota																CSC; 35			POC; 34	ROA; 29																10th	2194	
2023	Trevor Bayne	19	Toyota																								DAY; 29			BRI; 7	TEX; 33								10th	2194	
2023	Denny Hamlin	19	Toyota																									DAR; 1											10th	2194	
2024	Ryan Truex	19	Toyota	DAY; 21	ATL; 9																																		15th	761	
2024	Aric Almirola	19	Toyota			LVS; 12	PHO; 31																																15th	761	
2024	Ty Gibbs	19	Toyota					COA; 24									SON; 35			NSH; 20	CSC; 2							GLN; 25											15th	761	
2024	Taylor Gray	19	Toyota						RCH; 3	MAR; 13	TEX; 11	TAL; 15	DOV; 34	DAR; 18	CLT; 12							POC; 5		MCH; 8			ATL; 28			KAN; 38	TAL; 32		LVS; 33						15th	761	
2024	Josh Bilicki	19	Toyota													PIR; 12																ROV; 8							15th	761	
2024	Brett Moffitt	19	Toyota															IOW; 18																					15th	761	
2024	Justin Bonsignore	19	Toyota																NHA; 22																				15th	761	
2024	Joe Graf Jr.	19	Toyota																				IND; 17		DAY; 12	DAR; 11			BRI; 19										15th	761	
2024	William Sawalich	19	Toyota																															HOM; 24	MAR; 33	PHO; 13			15th	761	
2025	Justin Bonsignore	19	Toyota	DAY; 25					HOM; 16			BRI; 17	CAR; 38						POC; 38						IOW; 12						KAN; 37								1st	4035	
2025	Aric Almirola	19	Toyota		ATL; 3		PHO; 1	LVS; 2		MAR; 13				TAL; 33			NSH; 6			ATL; 7*			DOV; 2	IND; 35			DAY; 24		GTW; 6	BRI; 1		ROV; 14	LVS; 1*	TAL; 24	MAR; 5*	PHO; 2			1st	4035	
2025	Riley Herbst	19	Toyota			COA; 13									TEX; 3							SON; 5				GLN; 36													1st	4035	
2025	Christopher Bell	19	Toyota								DAR; 25																												1st	4035	
2025	Chase Briscoe	19	Toyota													CLT; 23																							1st	4035	
2025	Ty Gibbs	19	Toyota															MXC; 14																					1st	4035	
2025	Jack Perkins	19	Toyota																		CSC; 32							PIR; 31											1st	4035	
2026	Gio Ruggiero	19	Toyota	DAY; 37	ATL; 24																																		8th	2313	
2026	Brent Crews	19	Toyota			COA; 6	PHO; 18			MAR; 10	ROC; 26	BRI; 3	KAN; 5	TAL; 2	TEX; 4	GLN; 6*	DOV; 22	CLT; 37	NSH; 2	POC; 2	COR; 31	SON; 3	CHI; 4	ATL; 24	IND; 6	IOW; 16	DAY; 35	DAR; 3	GTW; 7	BRI; 3	LVS; 4	CLT; 30	PHO; 20	TAL; 34	MAR; 9	HOM; 3			8th	2313	
2026	Chase Briscoe	19	Toyota					LVS; 2																															8th	2313	
2026	Christopher Bell	19	Toyota						DAR; 3																														8th	2313	

=== Car No. 20 history ===
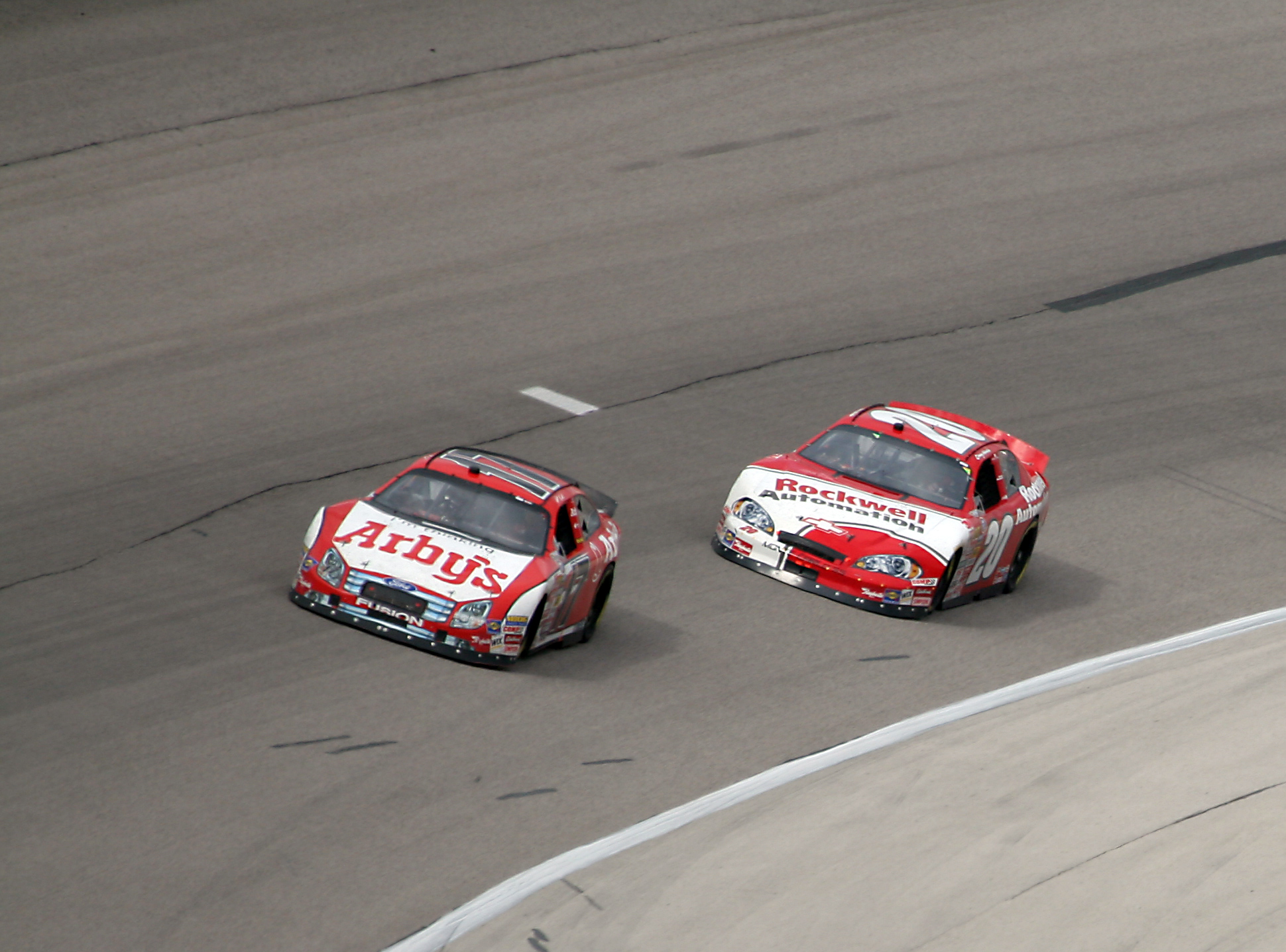
Denny Hamlin's No. 20 Busch car (right) battling Matt Kenseth (left) for position.

Early years (2001–2002)

The team fielded the No. 20 for 2001, and Mike McLaughlin was named the driver. Without a major sponsor, McLaughlin was able to win the Subway 300 and was sixth in points when Gibbs decided to shut down his team due to sponsorship problems. He moved to the No. 18 and finished seventh in points that year. Coy Gibbs ran five races in the No. 20 in 2002, with a sponsorship from Conagra Brands. His best finish was a 14th at Kentucky Speedway.

Mike Bliss (2003–2004)

After he moved to the 18, Gibbs was replaced by Mike Bliss and Rockwell Automation came aboard as a sponsor. Bliss had eight Top 5s and fourteen Top 10s, finishing 10th in points. In 2004, he pulled off a win at Charlotte and had three poles with six Top 5s and fourteen Top 10s to finish fifth in the point standings.

Denny Hamlin (2005–2008)

In 2005, Denny Hamlin came aboard and posted eleven Top 10s and finished fifth points, the third-place finisher in rookie points. He ran the full schedule in the No. 20 in 2006, winning two races and finishing fourth in points.

Hamlin and developmental driver Aric Almirola split duties in the No. 20 in 2007 with sponsorship from Rockwell Automation, with Tony Stewart also piloting the No. 20 at Atlanta. With Hamlin running several non-companion races, Almirola would occasionally qualify the car that Hamlin would later drive. Hamlin took the car to victory lane in four races, including Darlington, Milwaukee, Michigan, and Dover. The win at Milwaukee was controversial, with Almirola putting the car on the pole and starting the race because Hamlin was delayed flying from Sonoma Raceway. Almirola started the car and led the first 43 laps but was still relieved by Hamlin during a caution due to obligations to his sponsorship from Rockwell. Almirola was credited as the winner for starting the race but he did not participate in the victory celebration. He would leave JGR after the season. The No. 20 finished 2nd in the owners points behind RCR's No. 29.

Cup drivers (2008–2012)

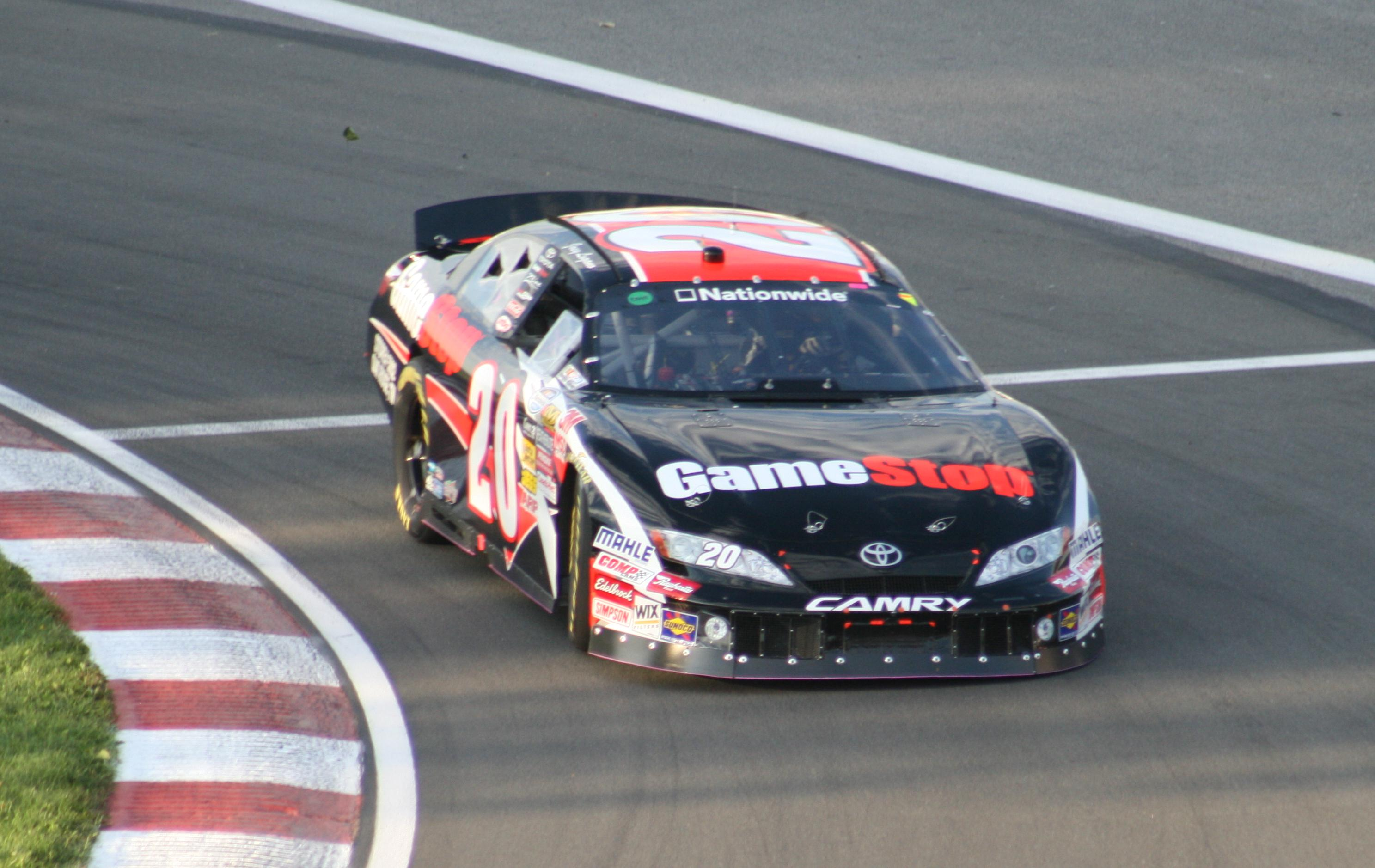
Joey Logano at Circuit Gilles Villeneuve in 2010.

In 2008, the No. 20 was shared by Hamlin, Kyle Busch, and Stewart for nine races before defending NASCAR Camping World East Series champion Joey Logano was named the driver of the No. 20 for the rest of the season's races except for Loudon (which Stewart won in the No. 20), Daytona (which Hamlin won in the No. 20), and Chicago (which Busch won in the No. 18). All four drivers of the No. 20 won races driving it in 2008. For 2009, 20-year-old Brad Coleman returned to JGR for a part-time schedule, sharing the ride with Logano and Hamlin. In 2010, Joey Logano, Denny Hamlin, and Matt DiBenedetto shared the No. 20 car, with Hamlin winning at Darlington and Logano winning at Kentucky and Kansas. For 2011, Logano returned to the No. 20 with sponsorships from GameStop and Sport Clips. Logano ran the first 10 races but picked up last-minute sponsorship from Harvest Investments to run Nashville. Due to a lack of sponsorship, the No. 20 was unable to run a full schedule for the owner's championship. In the 20, Logano grabbed his first superspeedway win at the July Daytona race with help from Kyle Busch. The No. 20 was also driven by Denny Hamlin at Las Vegas, Richmond, and Darlington, with Hamlin winning at Richmond. Drew Herring drove the No. 20 with Sport Clips at both Iowa races, where Herring won the pole for the May race, and Lucas Oil Raceway. Ryan Truex stepped into the No. 20 late in the season for six races, finishing second to Logano at Dover after dominating the race.

The No. 20 team returned in 2012 to run most of the season. Its primary driver lineup consisted of Logano, Hamlin, Truex, and JGR development driver Bubba Wallace. Michael Waltrip Racing driver Clint Bowyer also drove the No. 20 at Daytona when Hamlin was sidelined from the race by back problems.

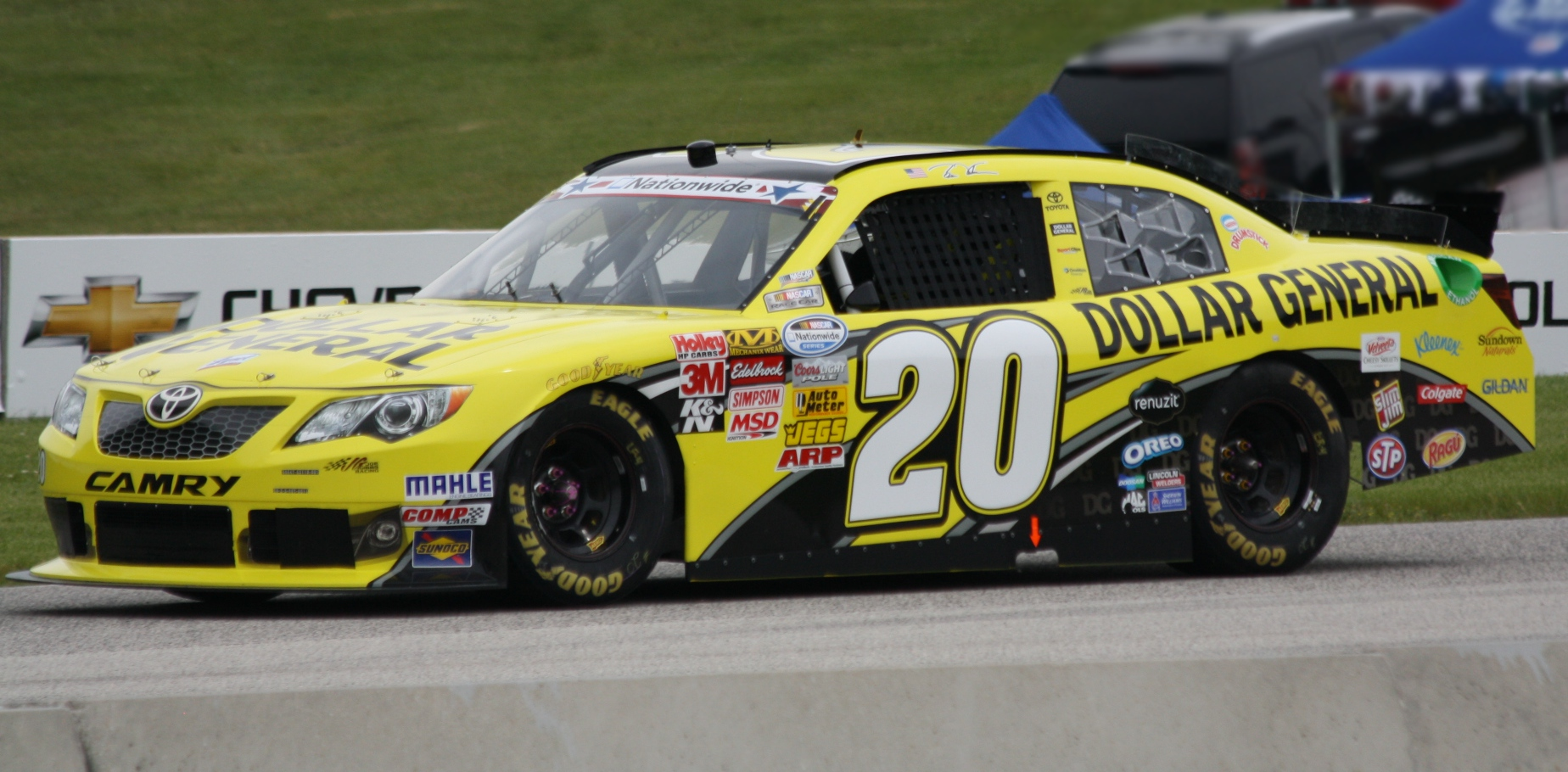
Brian Vickers in 2013.

Brian Vickers (2013)

Starting in the 2013 season, 2003 Busch Series Champion Brian Vickers joined the team driving the No. 20 for the full season with sponsorship from Dollar General, in addition to a partial Sprint Cup Series schedule in Michael Waltrip Racing's 55 car. Dollar General had sponsored Vickers in the past with Braun Racing, and like teammate Elliott Sadler, Vickers was attempting to reclaim his career in the second-tier series. After 30 starts, Vickers was sidelined with a second incidence of blood clots, replaced by Denny Hamlin and Drew Herring in the final three races of the season. Though he went winless, Vickers scored 13 top 5s and 18 top 10s to finish 10th in points. He would leave for a full-time ride at MWR at the end of the year.

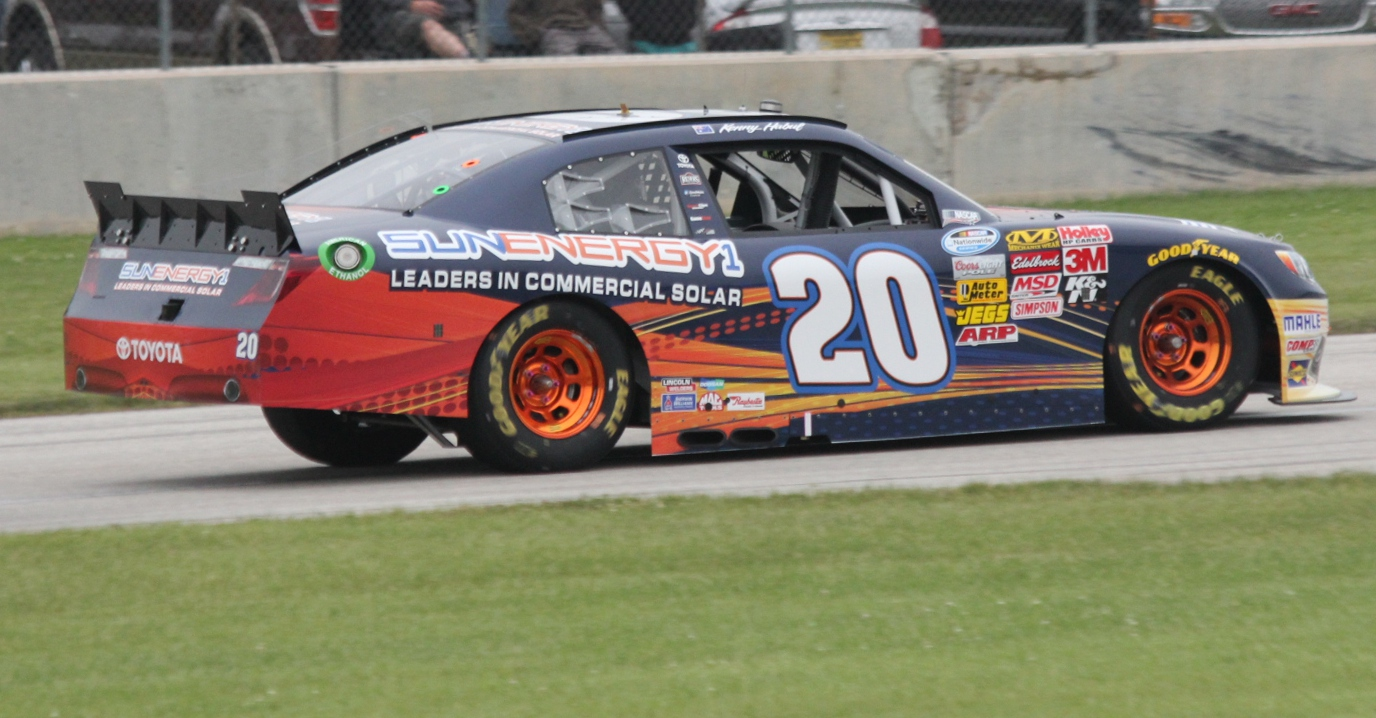
Kenny Habul at Road America in 2014

Multiple drivers (2014)

The No. 20 team continued to run full-time in 2014. Matt Kenseth drove the No. 20 in a total of 18 races, with GameStop sponsoring 10 races and Reser's Fine Foods sponsoring 7 races. Sam Hornish Jr. and Kenseth each ran 1 race and Kenny Habul 2 races with Habul's Sun Energy 1 sponsoring. Bubba Wallace ran at Talladega in the spring with ToyotaCare and Daytona in July with Coca-Cola "Share a Coke". Daniel Suárez made his debut at RIR, finishing 19th. Michael McDowell ran at both Iowa races with Pizza Ranch. Denny Hamlin returned to the No. 20 at Chicagoland in September with Sport Clips, finishing 32nd after a blown engine. Development driver Justin Boston, running the full ARCA schedule, made his debut in the No. 20 at Kentucky later in the month, with sponsor Zloop E-Recycling. Kenseth scored a win in the final race of the season at Homestead–Miami Speedway, and the No. 20 would finish 9th in owners points.

Erik Jones (2015–2017)

Erik Jones was scheduled to run a limited schedule in the No. 20 car in 2015, with Kenny Habul and SunEnergy1 also returning for the three road courses. Jones, whose schedule was expanded due to Kyle Busch's injury, scored his first Xfinity win in his 9th career start at Texas in April, leading a race-high 79 laps. Ross Kenseth, son of Sprint Cup Series champion Matt Kenseth, made his Xfinity Series debut at Chicagoland Speedway on June 20. David Ragan made a single start at Daytona in July with Interstate Batteries sponsorship. Kenny Wallace made his final career start in the No. 20 car at Iowa Speedway in August, with longtime sponsor U.S. Cellular. Wallace started seventh and finished 15th. Matt Tifft made his Xfinity Series debut at Kentucky in September, finishing 10th. Denny Hamlin drove a total of six races in the 20; two with SunEnergy 1 sponsorship, three with Hisense, and running a throwback scheme at Darlington in September with Sport Clips sponsoring. Hamlin scored three wins, all of which were from the pole starting position. Matt Kenseth ran five races with Reser's Fine Foods, scoring four-second-place finishes.

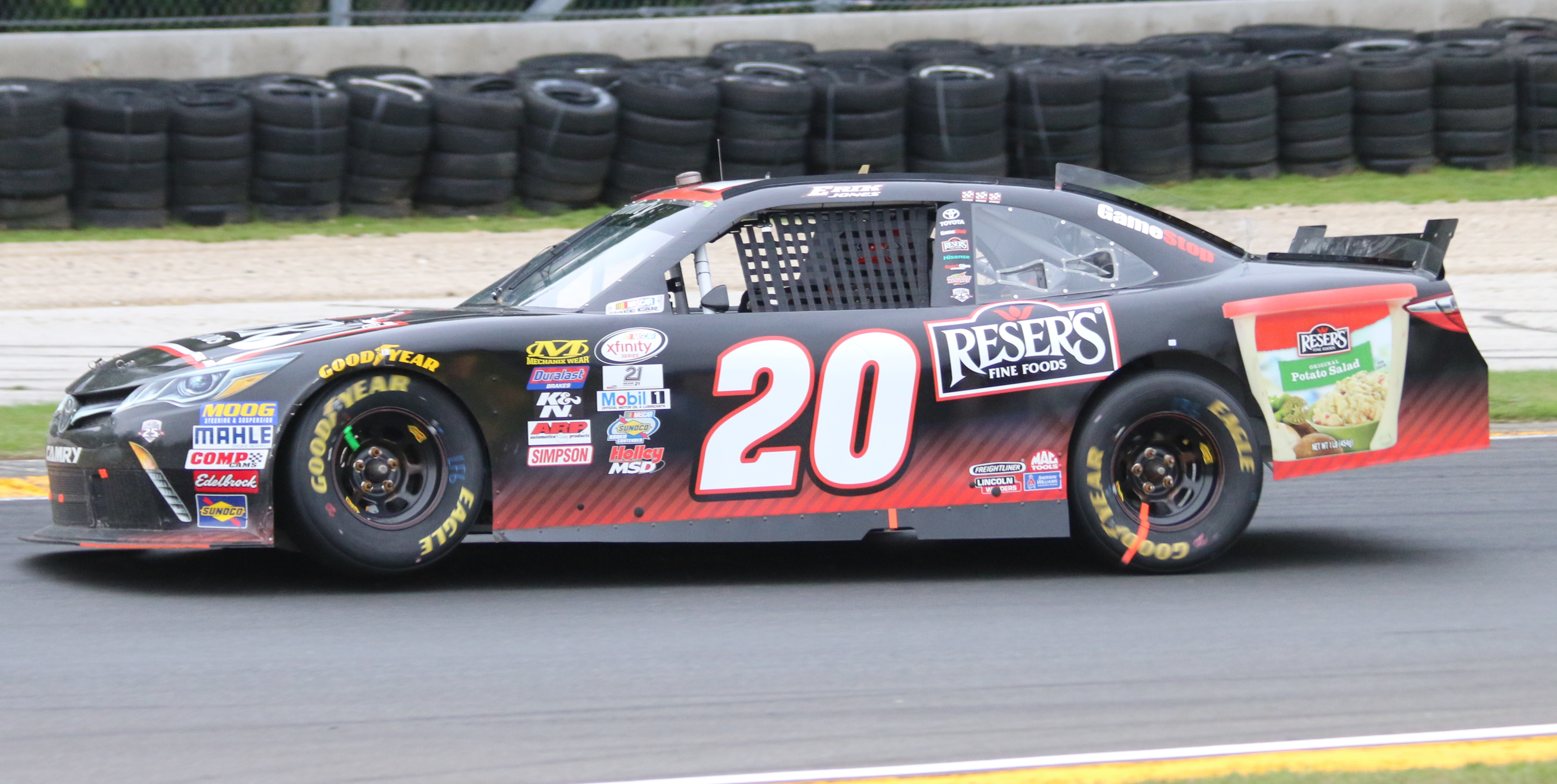
Erik Jones at Road America.

Erik Jones drove the car full-time in 2016, with Gamestop, Reser's, Hisense, Interstate Batteries and Dewalt as the sponsors. Jones won 4 times but finished 4th in points after getting trapped behind the slow car of Cole Whitt on the last restart of the final race at Homestead.

In 2017, the No. 20 was driven by a variety of different drivers. Denny Hamlin, Erik Jones, Kyle Benjamin, Christopher Bell, Daniel Suárez, James Davison and Ryan Preece are among them. Jones drove the car for 18 races starting at Daytona, sweeping the Texas races as well as winning the Bristol spring race. Hamlin drove the car for three races and won at Michigan. Suárez drove the No. 20 for two races at Las Vegas and the Bristol fall race, finishing 3rd and 2nd respectively. Benjamin drove the car for two races at the spring Richmond race and the first Pocono race, winning the pole in the latter. Bell drove the No. 20 for three races starting at the June Iowa race, where Bell won stage one, led the most laps, but finished 16th after being collected in a crash between the lapped cars of Brennan Poole and Ryan Reed while leading. Ryan Preece drove the car at Loudon, the July Iowa race, and the September Kentucky race. Preece finished 2nd to his teammate Kyle Busch at Loudon. In his next race at Iowa, Preece led the most laps and won the race, then finished 4th at Kentucky. James Davison drove the No. 20 at Mid Ohio and Road America, leading the most laps at Road America before getting collected in a wreck.

Christopher Bell (2017–2019)

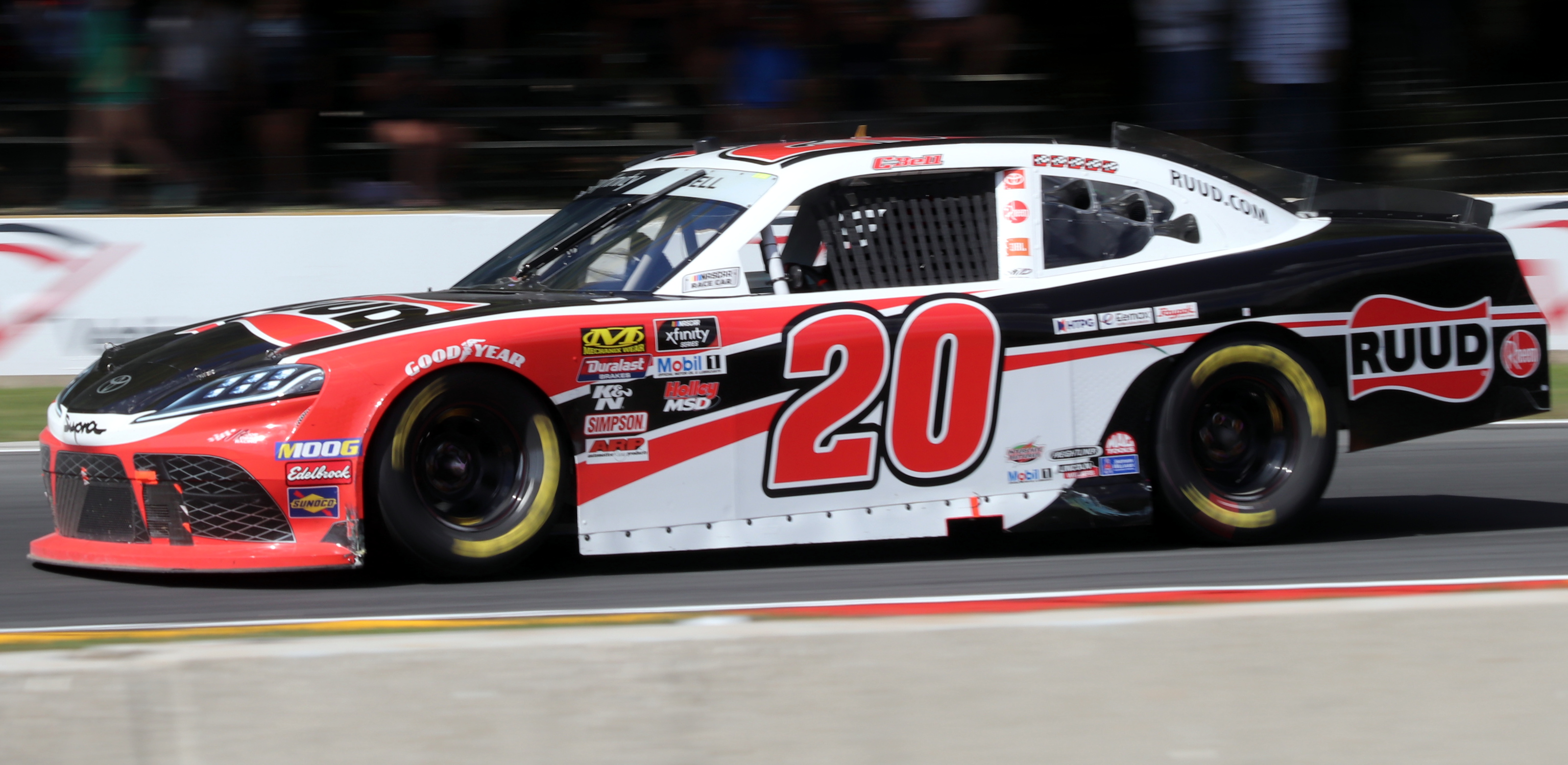
Christopher Bell at Road America in 2019.

For 2018, Christopher Bell drove the No. 20 full-time, competing for Rookie of the Year honors. Jason Ratcliff was his crew chief, moving from the No. 20 cup series team. Bell won seven races in 2018, breaking the record for a rookie in the series previously held by Greg Biffle and Kyle Busch. He made it to the Championship 4 but had a tire go down at Homestead and finished 13th in the race and 4th among the championship contenders. He returned for the full 2019 season.

Harrison Burton (2020–2021)

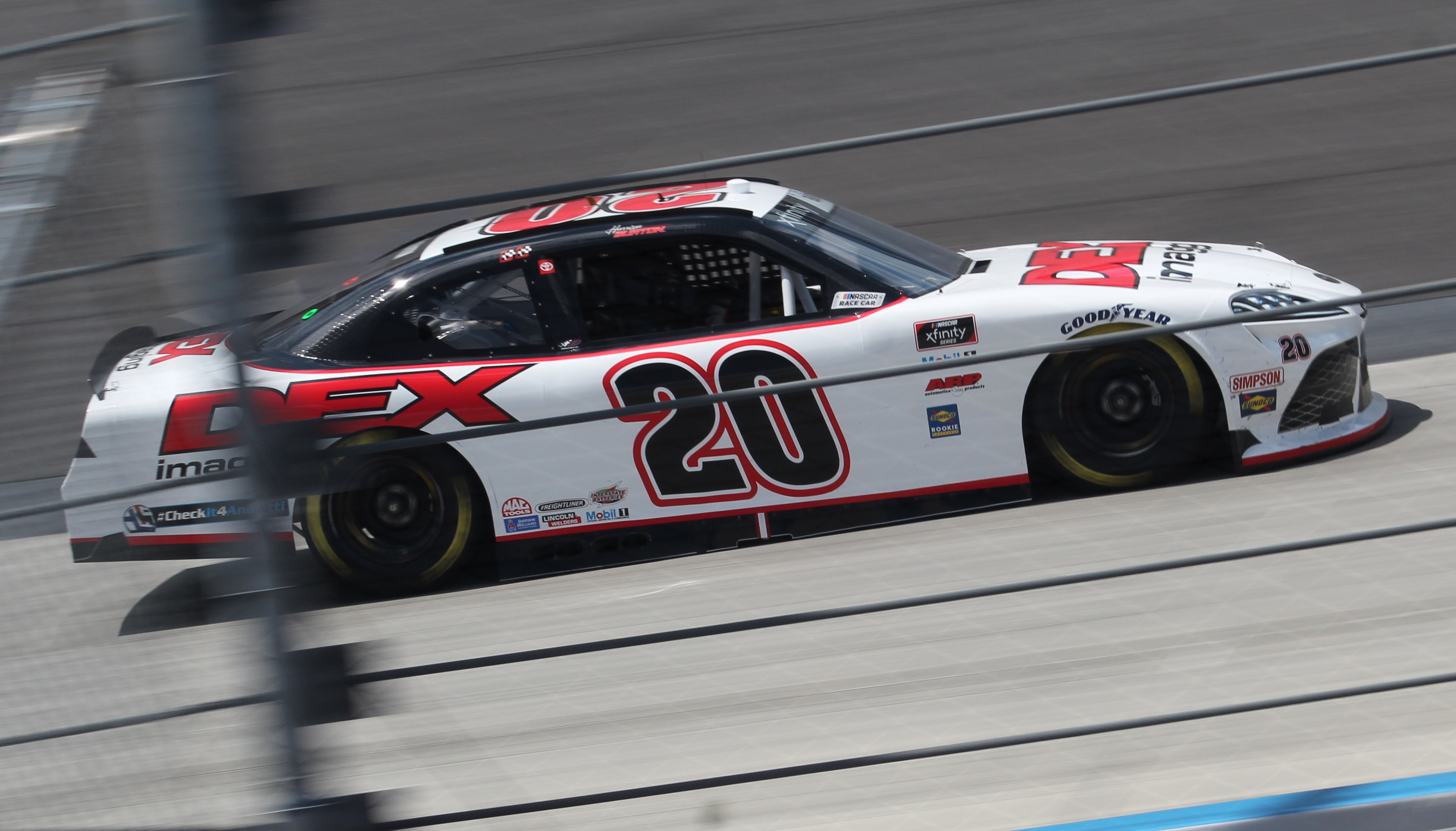
Burton's No. 20 car at Dover International Speedway in 2020

In 2020 and 2021, Harrison Burton drove for Joe Gibbs Racing full-time in their No. 20 Toyota, replacing Christopher Bell, who moved up to the NASCAR Cup Series while also competing for Rookie of the Year honors. Ben Beshore served as crew chief, moving from the No. 18 Xfinity Series team. During the 2020 season, Burton won his first four races at Fontana, Homestead, Texas, and Martinsville and finished eighth in the final standings. On July 15, 2021, it was announced that Burton would leave JGR to drive the Wood Brothers Racing No. 21 in the Cup Series for Wood Brothers in 2022. Despite not winning a race throughout 2021, Burton once again made the playoffs with his consistency and finished 8th in the final standings. Following the end of the 2021 season, JGR shut down the No. 20 team and downsized its Xfinity program to three teams: The Nos. 18, 19, and 54.

John Hunter Nemechek (2023)

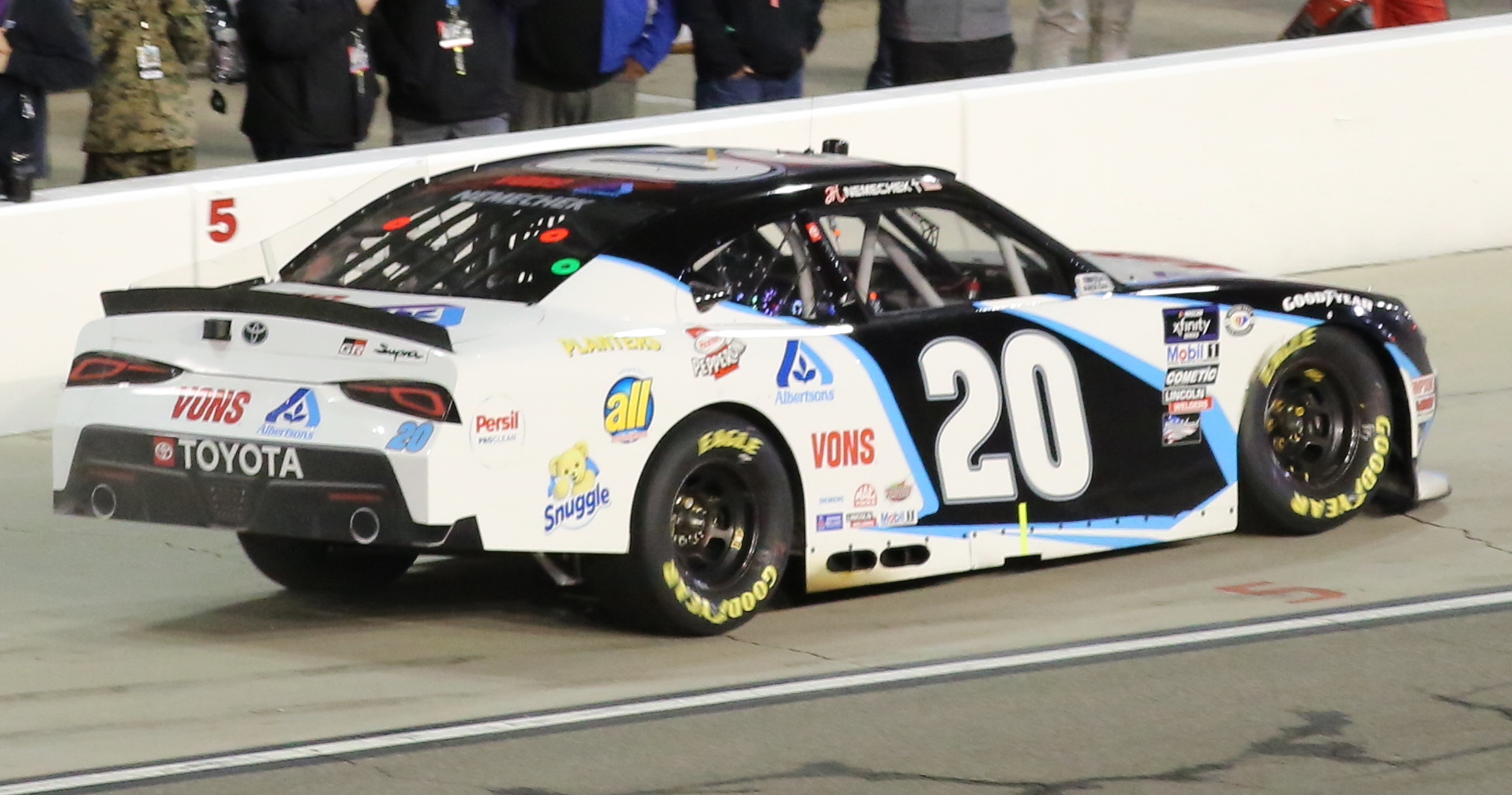
John Hunter Nemechek's race-winning car at Auto Club Speedway in 2023

On December 8, 2022, it was announced that John Hunter Nemechek would pilot the returning No. 20 in the Xfinity Series on a full time basis. Nemecheck began the 2023 season with a second-place finish at Daytona. Throughout the season, he scored wins at Fontana, Martinsville, Atlanta, New Hampshire, Michigan, and Kansas. During the playoffs, Nemechek won at Texas. He finished 28th at Phoenix and fourth in the points standings.

Multiple drivers (2024)

For 2024, Nemechek shared the No. 20 with Almirola, Ryan Truex, Ty Gibbs, and Bell. Nemecheck started the season with a seventh place finish at Daytona. Two weeks later, he scored a win at Las Vegas. Almirola won at Martinsville and took home the bonus US$100,000 for winning the first Dash 4 Cash race of the season. Truex brought the No. 20 to victory lane at Dover. A couple of days before the Charlotte race, Almirola and Bubba Wallace got into a physical altercation during a weekly competition meeting that included both the drivers of JGR and 23XI Racing. The exact reason for the dispute is unknown, but the team viewed Almirola as the instigator, causing the team to indefinitely suspend him and replace him with Ty Gibbs. JGR said it was a team decision. Bell took the No. 20 to victory lane at New Hampshire. Nemechek won again at Nashville a week later. Truex scored his second win of the season at the Daytona summer race. Bell won again at Darlington. During the playoffs, Almirola scored wins at Kansas and Martinsville.

Brandon Jones (2025–present)

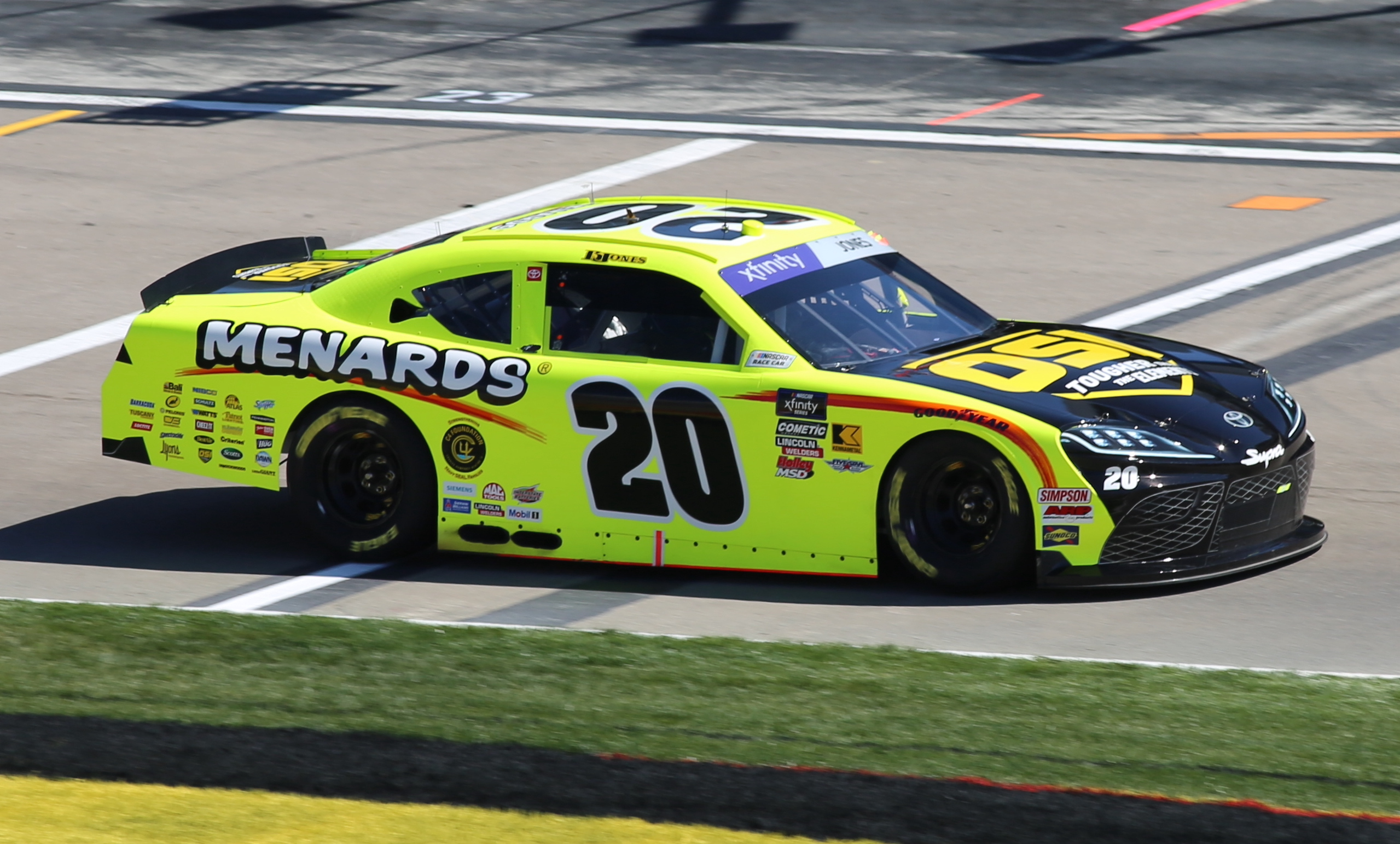
Brandon Jones in the No. 20 car at Las Vegas Motor Speedway in 2025

For the 2025 season, Brandon Jones returned to Joe Gibbs Racing in the No. 20 car, after leaving the team in 2022 to drive for JR Motorsports for two seasons. He started the season with a 37th-place finish at Daytona. At Darlington, Jones snapped a 98-race winless streak with a win by over ten-car lengths. During the playoffs, he won at Kansas.

Jones started the 2026 with a 30th-place finish at Daytona. He scored his first win of the season at Chicagoland. On August 27, he signed a contract extension with JGR. At Las Vegas, Jones was DQ'ed for having four or more lug nuts not safe & secure. Jones won the season finale at Homestead.

==== Car No. 20 results ====
Year	Driver	No.	Make	1	2	3	4	5	6	7	8	9	10	11	12	13	14	15	16	17	18	19	20	21	22	23	24	25	26	27	28	29	30	31	32	33	34	35	Owners	Pts
2001	Mike McLaughlin	20	Pontiac	DAY; 6	CAR; 14	LVS; 9	ATL; 11	DAR; 5	BRI; 13	TEX; 37	NSH; 9	TAL; 1	CAL; 10	RCH; 22	NHA; 10	NZH; 17	CLT; 11	DOV; 21	KEN; 25	MLW; 18	GLN	CHI	GTY	PPR	IRP	MCH	BRI	DAR												
2001	Mark McFarland	20	Pontiac																										RCH; 20	DOV	KAN	CLT	MEM	PHO	CAR	HOM				
2002	Coy Gibbs	20	Pontiac	DAY	CAR	LVS	DAR	BRI	TEX	NSH	TAL; 41	CAL	RCH	NHA	NZH	CLT	DOV	NSH	KEN; 14	MLW	DAY	CHI	GTY	PPR	IRP	MCH	BRI; 27	DAR	RCH	DOV									61st	416
2002	Coy Gibbs	20	Chevy																												KAN; 21	CLT	MEM; 30	ATL	CAR	PHO	HOM		61st	416
2003	Mike Bliss	20	Pontiac	DAY; 33						TAL; 5											DAY; 39																		10th	3932
2003	Mike Bliss	20	Chevy		CAR; 6	LVS; 3	DAR; 32	BRI; 5	TEX; 22		NSH; 4	CAL; 17	RCH; 28	GTY; 12*	NZH; 3	CLT; 5	DOV; 9	NSH; 33	KEN; 31	MLW; 21		CHI; 10	NHA; 33	PPR; 16	IRP; 10	MCH; 16	BRI; 30	DAR; 12	RCH; 27	DOV; 5	KAN; 31	CLT; 3	MEM; 8	ATL; 21	PHO; 20	CAR; 15	HOM; 7		10th	3932
2004	Mike Bliss	20	Chevy	DAY; 30	CAR; 13	LVS; 12	DAR; 10	BRI; 17	TEX; 18	NSH; 8	TAL; 39	CAL; 17	GTY; 17	RCH; 8	NZH; 33	CLT; 16	DOV; 19	NSH; 4	KEN; 3	MLW; 6	DAY; 5	CHI; 33	NHA; 32	PPR; 6	IRP; 7	MCH; 10	BRI; 21	CAL; 16	RCH; 6	DOV; 18	KAN; 19	CLT; 1	MEM; 5	ATL; 27	PHO; 12	DAR; 3	HOM; 27		5th	4115
2005	Denny Hamlin	20	Chevy	DAY; 33	CAL; 18	MXC; 15	LVS; 12	ATL; 16	NSH; 9	BRI; 9	TEX; 14	PHO; 11	TAL; 28	DAR; 7	RCH; 13	CLT; 20	DOV; 24	NSH; 7	KEN; 15	MLW; 6	DAY; 14	CHI; 15	NHA; 3	PPR; 14	GTY; 11	IRP; 6	GLN; 33	MCH; 8	BRI; 13	CAL; 20	RCH; 34	DOV; 6	KAN; 12	CLT; 30	MEM; 7	TEX; 19	PHO; 9	HOM; 37	5th	4143
2006	Denny Hamlin	20	Chevy	DAY; 14	CAL; 10	MXC; 1*	LVS; 6	ATL; 38	BRI; 4	TEX; 10	NSH; 3*	PHO; 39	TAL; 30	RCH; 10	DAR; 1	CLT; 29	DOV; 7	NSH; 4	KEN; 3	MLW; 2	DAY; 30	CHI; 14	NHA; 3	MAR; 3	GTY; 3*	IRP; 8	GLN; 12	MCH; 6	BRI; 22	CAL; 15	RCH; 6	DOV; 40	KAN; 33	CLT; 8	MEM; 6	TEX; 8	PHO; 3	HOM; 4	4th	4667
2007	Denny Hamlin	20	Chevy	DAY; 9	CAL; 8	MXC; 2	LVS; 12				TEX; 2	PHO; 4		RCH; 41	DAR; 1	CLT; 34	DOV; 2			MLW; RL^{†}	NHA; 5		CHI; 7				GLN; 14	MCH; 1		CAL; 3	RCH; 7	DOV; 1	KAN; 6	CLT; 5		TEX; 3	PHO; 28	HOM; 13	2nd	
2007	Tony Stewart	20	Chevy					ATL; 10																															2nd	
2007	Aric Almirola	20	Chevy						BRI; 32	NSH; 19			TAL; 20					NSH; 10	KEN; 6	MLW; 1		DAY; 28			IRP; 6	CGV; 11			BRI; 10										2nd	
2007	Travis Kittleson	20	Chevy																					GTY; 17															2nd	
2007	J. J. Yeley	20	Chevy																																MEM; 11				2nd	
2008	Tony Stewart	20	Toyota	DAY; 1	CAL; 1*	LVS; 27				TEX; 10			TAL; 1*		DAR; 1*						NHA; 1*		CHI; 9					MCH; 3												
2008	Kyle Busch	20	Toyota				ATL; 24*		NSH; 16*			MXC; 1																												
2008	Denny Hamlin	20	Toyota					BRI; 26			PHO; 3			RCH; 1		CLT; 2						DAY; 1																		
2008	Joey Logano	20	Toyota														DOV; 6	NSH; 31	KEN; 1*	MLW; 2				GTY; 2	IRP; 8	CGV; 17	GLN; 7		BRI; 16	CAL; 6	RCH; 7	DOV; 14	KAN; 9	CLT; 14	MEM; 5	TEX; 4	PHO; 10	HOM; 10		
2009	Joey Logano	20	Toyota	DAY; 20	CAL; 3		BRI; 9	TEX; 12	NSH; 1*	PHO; 4	TAL; 3	RCH; 6	DAR; 12	CLT; 5	DOV; 2		KEN; 1		NHA; 2*	DAY; 4	CHI; 1*				GLN; 33				ATL; 6			KAN; 1	CAL; 1	CLT; 14		TEX; 24		HOM; 4		
2009	Denny Hamlin	20	Toyota			LVS; 21																								RCH; 17	DOV; 27						PHO; 12			
2009	Brad Coleman	20	Toyota													NSH; 10		MLW; 24				GTY; 5	IRP; 16	IOW; 13		MCH; 23	BRI; 29	CGV; 28												
2009	Matt DiBenedetto	20	Toyota																																MEM; 14					
2010	Joey Logano	20	Toyota	DAY; 7	CAL; 5*		BRI; 14	NSH; 8*	PHO; 10	TEX; 2	TAL; 2	RCH; 6			CLT; 3		KEN; 1*		NHA; 4	DAY; 2	CHI; 2				GLN; 2	MCH; 6	BRI; 10	CGV; 6	ATL; 6		DOV; 2	KAN; 1	CAL; 5	CLT; 4		TEX; 4	PHO; 3	HOM; 7		
2010	Denny Hamlin	20	Toyota			LVS; 2							DAR; 1*	DOV; 12																RCH; 6										
2010	Matt DiBenedetto	20	Toyota													NSH; 10		ROA; 29				GTY; 29	IRP; 31	IOW; 9											GTY; 24					
2011	Joey Logano	20	Toyota	DAY; 12	PHO; 6		BRI; 5	CAL; 7	TEX; 4	TAL; 2	NSH; 4			DOV; 13		CLT; 11	CHI	MCH; 6	ROA	DAY; 1	KEN; 10	NHA; 29	IRP			GLN; 3	CGV	BRI; 2						CLT; 19	TEX; 8		HOM; 10			
2011	Denny Hamlin	20	Toyota			LVS; 7						RCH; 1*	DAR; 2																											
2011	Drew Herring	20	Toyota												IOW; 12									IRP; 8	IOW; 11															
2011	Ryan Truex	20	Toyota																										ATL; 11	RCH; 4	CHI; 13	DOV; 8	KAN; 10			PHO; 8				
2012	Joey Logano	20	Toyota	DAY; 16	PHO; 8	LVS			TEX; 15	RCH; 18		DAR; 1		CLT; 6								IND; 7										CLT; 1*	KAN	TEX; 10						
2012	Ryan Truex	20	Toyota				BRI; 10	CAL			TAL; 11				DOV; 2									GLN; 15	CGV	BRI	ATL									HOM; 38				
2012	Bubba Wallace	20	Toyota										IOW; 9										IOW; 7					RCH; 10	CHI	KEN	DOV; 12									
2012	Michael McDowell	20	Toyota													MCH; 7	ROA	KEN																						
2012	Clint Bowyer	20	Toyota																DAY; 26	NHA	CHI																			
2012	Brian Vickers	20	Toyota																																PHO; 2					
2013	Brian Vickers	20	Toyota	DAY; 19	PHO; 17	LVS; 3	BRI; 3	CAL; 34	TEX; 9	RCH; 4	TAL; 15	DAR; 3	CLT; 11	DOV; 2	IOW; 29	MCH; 33	ROA; 6	KEN; 4	DAY; 13	NHA; 2	CHI; 5	IND; 4	IOW; 3	GLN; 3	MOH; 5	BRI; 34	ATL; 15	RCH; 7	CHI; 6	KEN; 7	DOV; 4	KAN; 29	CLT; 31							
2013	Denny Hamlin	20	Toyota																															TEX; 2						
2013	Drew Herring	20	Toyota																																PHO; 16	HOM; 15				
2014	Matt Kenseth	20	Toyota	DAY; 14	PHO; 5	LVS; 6	BRI; 5	CAL; 7	TEX; 6	DAR; 3				CLT; 6	DOV; 4			KEN; 36		NHA; 3		IND; 3		GLN; 5			ATL; 11	RCH; 12				KAN; 6	CLT; 3	TEX; 5		HOM; 1			9th	1142
2014	Daniel Suárez	20	Toyota								RCH; 19																												9th	1142
2014	Bubba Wallace	20	Toyota									TAL; 31							DAY; 7																				9th	1142
2014	Michael McDowell	20	Toyota										IOW; 7										IOW; 2																9th	1142
2014	Sam Hornish Jr.	20	Toyota													MCH; 2																							9th	1142
2014	Kenny Habul	20	Toyota														ROA; 14								MOH; 31														9th	1142
2014	Erik Jones	20	Toyota																		CHI; 7					BRI; 8									PHO; 6				9th	1142
2014	Denny Hamlin	20	Toyota																										CHI; 32										9th	1142
2014	Justin Boston	20	Toyota																											KEN; 9	DOV; 12								9th	1142
2015	Erik Jones	20	Toyota	DAY; 18		LVS; 29		CAL; 3	TEX; 1*	BRI; 4		TAL; 30	IOW; 3	CLT; 15					KEN; 2		IND; 34							RCH; 5				CLT; 2		TEX; 4	PHO; 3	HOM; 3			5th	1186
2015	Matt Kenseth	20	Toyota		ATL; 8		PHO; 2								DOV; 2														CHI; 2				KAN; 2*						5th	1186
2015	Denny Hamlin	20	Toyota								RCH; 1*					MCH; 10				NHA; 1*					BRI; 3*		DAR; 1*				DOV; 2								5th	1186
2015	Ross Kenseth	20	Toyota														CHI; 6																						5th	1186
2015	David Ragan	20	Toyota															DAY; 7																					5th	1186
2015	Kenny Wallace	20	Toyota																			IOW; 15																	5th	1186
2015	Kenny Habul	20	Toyota																				GLN; 29	MOH; 28		ROA; 14													5th	1186
2015	Matt Tifft	20	Toyota																											KEN; 10									5th	1186
2016	Erik Jones	20	Toyota	DAY; 31	ATL; 3	LVS; 3	PHO; 2	CAL; 15	TEX; 2	BRI; 1	RCH; 34	TAL; 21	DOV; 1*	CLT; 31	POC; 2	MCH; 4	IOW; 27	DAY; 10	KEN; 4	NHA; 2	IND; 22	IOW; 1*	GLN; 12	MOH; 6	BRI; 33	ROA; 21	DAR; 6	RCH; 2	CHI; 1	KEN; 28*	DOV; 16	CLT; 5	KAN; 15	TEX; 4	PHO; 10	HOM; 9			8th	2220
2017	Erik Jones	20	Toyota	DAY; 32			PHO; 3	CAL; 4	TEX; 1*	BRI; 1		TAL; 5		DOV; 35				DAY; 25	KEN; 3*		IND; 23		GLN; 8				DAR; 4		CHI; 18*		DOV; 20	CLT; 30	KAN; 15*	TEX; 1*	PHO; 3				4th	4001
2017	Denny Hamlin	20	Toyota		ATL; 20								CLT; 5			MCH; 1																							4th	4001
2017	Daniel Suárez	20	Toyota			LVS; 3																			BRI; 2														4th	4001
2017	Kyle Benjamin	20	Toyota								RCH; 32				POC; 16																								4th	4001
2017	Christopher Bell	20	Toyota														IOW; 16											RCH; 6								HOM; 36			4th	4001
2017	Ryan Preece	20	Toyota																	NHA; 2		IOW; 1								KEN; 4									4th	4001
2017	James Davison	20	Toyota																					MOH; 4		ROA; 37													4th	4001
2018	Christopher Bell	20	Toyota	DAY; 39	ATL; 3	LVS; 2	PHO; 4	CAL; 21	TEX; 2	BRI; 29	RCH; 1*	TAL; 12	DOV; 4	CLT; 3	POC; 36	MCH; 11	IOW; 2	CHI; 12	DAY; 3	KEN; 1	NHA; 1*	IOW; 1	GLN; 9	MOH; 11	BRI; 2	ROA; 23	DAR; 34	IND; 7	LVS; 4	RCH; 1	ROV; 5	DOV; 1*	KAN; 37	TEX; 32	PHO; 1*	HOM; 11			4th	4026
2019	Christopher Bell	20	Toyota	DAY; 6	ATL; 1*	LVS; 13	PHO; 30	CAL; 3	TEX; 3*	BRI; 1	RCH; 16	TAL; 3	DOV; 1	CLT; 31	POC; 5	MCH; 13	IOW; 1*	CHI; 38	DAY; 3	KEN; 2	NHA; 1*	IOW; 2*	GLN; 2	MOH; 2	BRI; 14	ROA; 1	DAR; 4	IND; 29	LVS; 2*	RCH; 1*	ROV; 12	DOV; 25	KAN; 12	TEX; 1*	PHO; 16*	HOM; 5			3rd	4032
2020	Harrison Burton	20	Toyota	DAY; 2	LVS; 5	CAL; 1	PHO; 2	DAR; 9	CLT; 9	BRI; 4	ATL; 5	HOM; 1	HOM; 8	TAL; 32	POC; 32	IRC; 25	KEN; 17	KEN; 12	TEX; 4	KAN; 3	ROA; 16	DRC; 8	DOV; 5	DOV; 11	DAY; 5	DAR; 6	RCH; 16	RCH; 4	BRI; 4	LVS; 9	TAL; 23	ROV; 33	KAN; 11	TEX; 1	MAR; 1*	PHO; 6			8th	2248
2021	Harrison Burton	20	Toyota	DAY; 3*	DRC; 6	HOM; 39	LVS; 9	PHO; 12	ATL; 3	MAR; 7	TAL; 10	DAR; 11	DOV; 6	COA; 6	CLT; 3	MOH; 38	TEX; 30	NSH; 3	POC; 37	ROA; 5	ATL; 24	NHA; 5	GLN; 5	IRC; 9	MCH; 5	DAY; 9	DAR; 2	RCH; 9	BRI; 7	LVS; 10	TAL; 25	ROV; 15	TEX; 8	KAN; 34	MAR; 20	PHO; 3			9th	2193
2023	John Hunter Nemechek	20	Toyota	DAY; 2	CAL; 1*	LVS; 6	PHO; 6	ATL; 8	COA; 27	RCH; 2	MAR; 1*	TAL; 32	DOV; 5	DAR; 5*	CLT; 2	PIR; 10	SON; 16	NSH; 6	CSC; 2	ATL; 1	NHA; 1*	POC; 32	ROA; 34	MCH; 1*	IRC; 13	GLN; 6	DAY; 28	DAR; 3*	KAN; 1*	BRI; 3	TEX; 1	ROV; 8	LVS; 2	HOM; 3	MAR; 18	PHO; 28			4th	4009
2024	John Hunter Nemechek	20	Toyota	DAY; 7	ATL; 32	LVS; 1*	PHO; 32	COA; 3									SON; 6	IOW; 27		NSH; 1*	CSC; 25			MCH; 3															2nd	4034
2024	Aric Almirola	20	Toyota						RCH; 2*	MAR; 1*				DAR; 5									IND; 3					GLN; 26		KAN; 1	TAL; 19	ROV; 9	LVS; 13	HOM; 3	MAR; 1*	PHO; 3			2nd	4034
2024	Ryan Truex	20	Toyota								TEX; 7	TAL; 34	DOV; 1			PIR; 27						POC; 19			DAY; 1		ATL; 10		BRI; 5										2nd	4034
2024	Ty Gibbs	20	Toyota												CLT; 9																								2nd	4034
2024	Christopher Bell	20	Toyota																NHA; 1							DAR; 1*													2nd	4034
2025	Brandon Jones	20	Toyota	DAY; 37	ATL; 13	COA; 30	PHO; 3	LVS; 6	HOM; 7	MAR; 22	DAR; 1	BRI; 5	CAR; 12	TAL; 28	TEX; 6	CLT; 19	NSH; 17	MXC; 25	POC; 18	ATL; 14	CSC; 21	SON; 13	DOV; 3	IND; 32	IOW; 23	GLN; 9	DAY; 6	PIR; 18	GTW; 4	BRI; 11	KAN; 1	ROV; 18	LVS; 13	TAL; 26	MAR; 3	PHO; 4			6th	2240
2026	Brandon Jones	20	Toyota	DAY; 30	ATL; 10	COA; 15	PHO; 16	LVS; 13	DAR; 2	MAR; 18	ROC; 2	BRI; 19	KAN; 8*	TAL; 8	TEX; 8	GLN; 5	DOV; 6	CLT; 35	NSH; 5	POC; 8	COR; 12	SON; 36	CHI; 1	ATL; 7	IND; 9	IOW; 14	DAY; 5	DAR; 10	GTW; 15	BRI; 15	LVS; 36	CLT; 6	PHO; 6	TAL; 9	MAR; 4	HOM; 1			9th	2309

=== Car No. 42 history ===
In 1997, JGR fielded the No. 42 Pontiac for J. D. Gibbs at Rockingham, where he failed to qualify.

In 1998, the No. 42 attempted to run 7 races with Gibbs behind the wheel. However, he only managed to qualify for 1 race at Darlington. Jeff Fuller also made one start at Charlotte.

In 1999, the No. 42 was driven by Sterling Marlin, Fuller, and Gibbs.

==== Car No. 42 results ====
Year	Driver	No.	Make	1	2	3	4	5	6	7	8	9	10	11	12	13	14	15	16	17	18	19	20	21	22	23	24	25	26	27	28	29	30	31	32	Owners	Pts
1997	J. D. Gibbs	42	Pontiac	DAY	CAR	RCH	ATL	LVS	DAR	HCY	TEX	BRI	NSV	TAL	NHA	NZH	CLT	DOV	SBO	GLN	MLW	MYB	GTY	IRP	MCH	BRI	DAR	RCH	DOV	CLT	CAL	CAR; DNQ	HOM			N/A	-
1998	J. D. Gibbs	42	Pontiac	DAY	CAR; DNQ	LVS	NSV																									CAR; DNQ	ATL	HOM			
1998	J. D. Gibbs	42	Chevy					DAR; 29	BRI	TEX	HCY	TAL	NHA	NZH	CLT	DOV	RCH; DNQ	PPR	GLN	MLW	MYB	CAL	SBO	IRP	MCH; DNQ	BRI	DAR	RCH; DNQ	DOV		GTY; DNQ						
1998	Jeff Fuller	42	Pontiac																											CLT; 15							
1999	Sterling Marlin	42	Pontiac	DAY	CAR	LVS; 33	ATL	DAR	TEX; DNQ	NSV	BRI	TAL	CAL; DNQ	NHA	RCH	NZH	CLT	DOV	SBO	GLN	MLW	MYB	PPR	GTY	IRP	MCH											
1999	Jeff Fuller	42	Pontiac																								BRI; 20	DAR; 13	RCH	DOV	CLT; 37	CAR					
1999	J. D. Gibbs	42	Pontiac																														MEM; DNQ	PHO	HOM		

=== Car No. 44 history ===
In 1998, JGR purchased the No. 44 Shell Oil-sponsored Pontiac from his Cup Series driver Bobby Labonte, who had been operating the team under his control. The team made its debut under the Gibbs banner at the 1998 NAPA Auto Parts 300 with then-IndyCar driver Tony Stewart driving. Stewart, he qualified 9th but finished 31st after a crash. At the next week at Rockingham Speedway, Stewart qualified on the pole, led 60 laps, and finished 2nd. Stewart ran a total of 22 races that year, with five top-five finishes and winning two pole positions. Labonte ran five races that year in that car in 1998, winning the Diamond Hill Plywood 200.

==== Car No. 44 results ====
Year	Driver	No.	Make	1	2	3	4	5	6	7	8	9	10	11	12	13	14	15	16	17	18	19	20	21	22	23	24	25	26	27	28	29	30	31	Owners	Pts
1998	Tony Stewart	44	Pontiac	DAY; 31	CAR; 2	LVS; 34	NSV; 17		BRI; 26	TEX; 15	HCY; 13	TAL; 28	NHA; 2	NZH		DOV; 3		PPR; 14		MLW; 12	MYB; 35			IRP; 12		BRI; 21	DAR; 16	RCH; 29		CLT; 32	GTY; 5	CAR; 18	ATL; 3	HOM; 39		
1998	Bobby Labonte	44	Pontiac					DAR; 1							CLT; 6		RCH; 42								MCH; 2				DOV; 34							
1998	J. D. Gibbs	44	Chevy																GLN; 31			CAL; 36	SBO; 20													

=== Car No. 54 history ===
Multiple drivers (2013–2015)

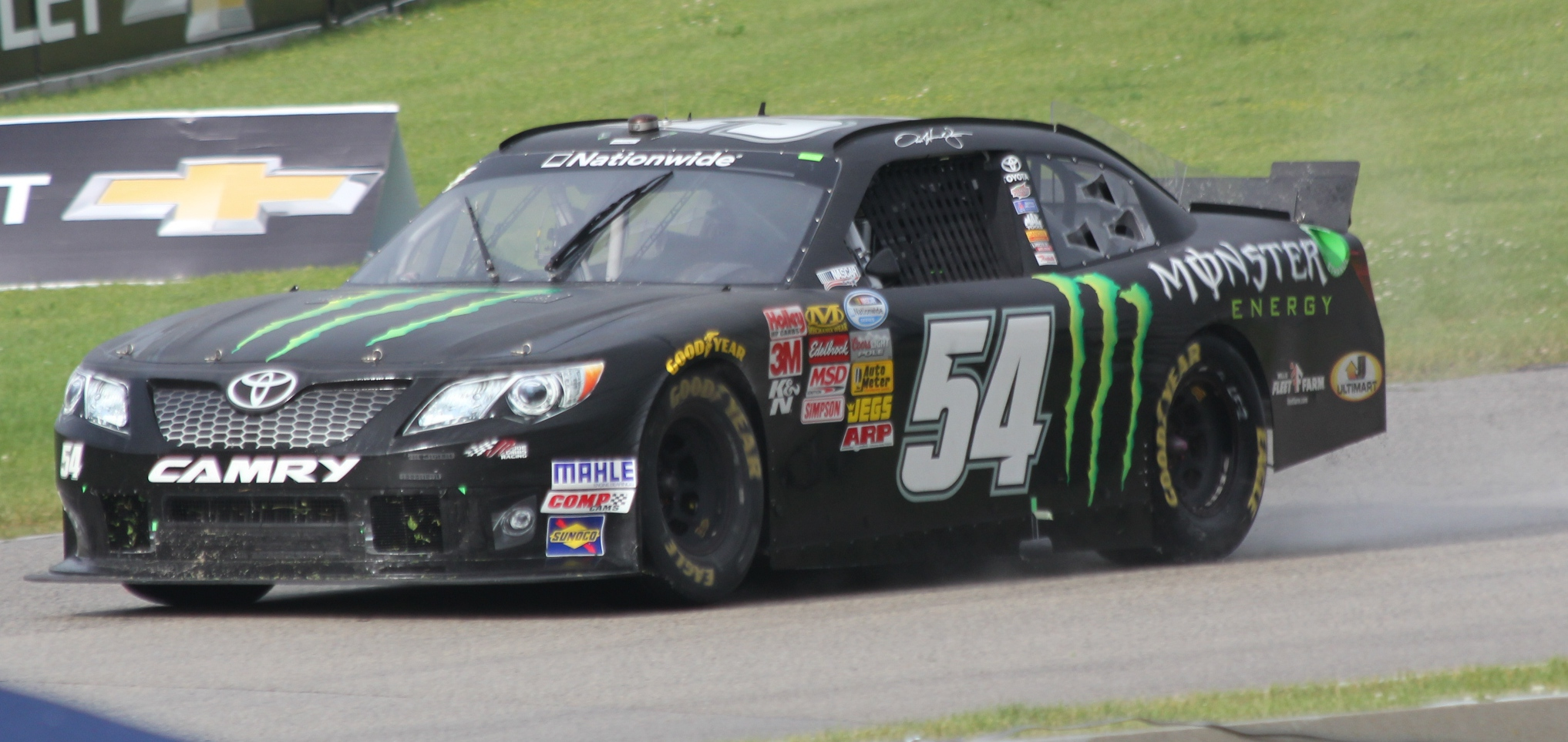
Sam Hornish Jr. at Road America in 2014.

In 2012, Kyle Busch fielded the No. 54. After running the No. 54 for his team in 2012 with only one win (by his brother Kurt), Kyle Busch returned to JGR's strong Nationwide program with the No. 54 as a fourth JGR car, running 26 races and bringing sponsor Monster Energy with him. Parker Kligerman would take over the newly renumbered 77 for KBM. Busch didn't take long to get to victory lane. He won the pole, lead the most laps, and won the race in only the second race of the 2013 season at Phoenix International Raceway. He then scored victories at Bristol (4th race) and at Fontana (5th race). During the 2013 season, he won a total of 12 races. Joey Coulter, Owen Kelly, and Drew Herring also ran in the 54, which finished 2nd in the owner's championship to the Team Penske No. 22 by one point.

For the 2014 season, Kyle Busch ran part-time the No. 54 car, running all Sprint Cup Series companion races except Talladega and Daytona in July. Former IRL champion Sam Hornish Jr., who was not re-signed by Team Penske after scoring a win and finishing 2nd in Nationwide points in 2013, ran 7 races to help compete for the owner's championship. At Iowa in May, Hornish won the Get To Know Newton 250, beating Ryan Blaney's 22 for his third career win. The 54 once again finished 2nd in owners points to the Penske 22.

In 2015, Kyle Busch suffered injuries during the season-opening race at Daytona. He broke his leg after hitting the inside wall that had no SAFER barrier installed. His replacements were announced to be Erik Jones (at least 3 races), Cup series teammate Denny Hamlin (5 races), and road course veteran Boris Said (7 races). Busch returned to the Xfinity Series at Michigan in June and scored his first win of the season. Jones scored a win the following race at Chicagoland, his second of the season.

Part-time (2020)

For the 2020 season Kyle Busch (5 races) and Denny Hamlin (1 race) will race in the No. 54 car (previously used in 2012–15).

Multiple drivers (2021)

On January 27, 2021, it was confirmed that Ty Gibbs, Ty Dillon, Denny Hamlin, Kyle Busch, and Martin Truex Jr. would drive the 54 car in select races for the 2021 season. Ty Gibbs won in his series debut at the Daytona Road Course while Busch won by 11 seconds at COTA. Following Busch's win, Gibbs won again the next week at Charlotte holding off Austin Cindric for the second time. In the series' return to Nashville Superspeedway, Busch made history by winning his 100th race. On July 3, Busch battled back from adversity to win the Henry 180 at Road America.

Ty Gibbs (2021–2022)

Ty Gibbs returned to the No. 54 in 2022 on a full-time basis. He won at Las Vegas, Atlanta, and Richmond. At the Martinsville spring race on April 8, Gibbs finished eighth after Sam Mayer did a bump and run on him on the final lap. After the race, Gibbs attempted to spin Mayer out during the cool-down laps before both drivers engaged in a fistfight on pit road. In addition to this incident, Gibbs was fined US$15,000 for hitting Mayer's car on pit road after the race. Gibbs scored his fourth win at Road America by passing Kyle Larson on the final lap. He claimed his fifth win of the season at Michigan. At Watkins Glen, Gibbs fiercely battled William Byron for the lead throughout most of the race until they both spun off-course during the final restart, resulting in Gibbs finishing 27th. At the Martinsville playoff race, Gibbs dumped Jones to the outside wall on the final overtime lap to win and make the Championship 4. After the race, he compared himself to Jesus in an interview on the SiriusXM NASCAR channel. Gibbs dominated at Phoenix to become the 2022 NASCAR Xfinity Series champion.

Taylor Gray (2025-Present)

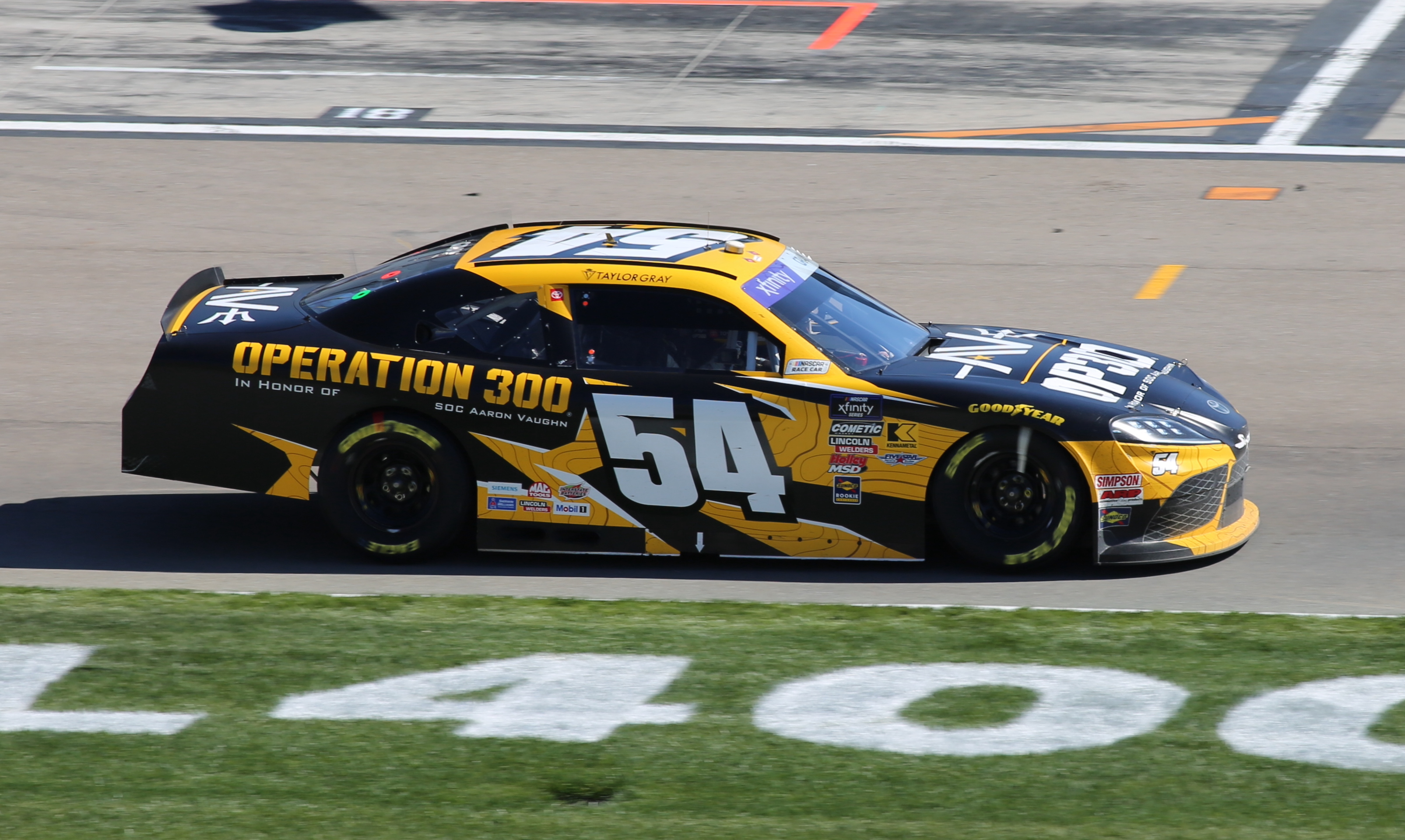
Taylor Gray in the No. 54 car at Las Vegas Motor Speedway in 2025

On October 16, 2024, JGR announced that the No. 54 car will return under the ownership of Ty Gibbs and will be driven by Taylor Gray. Gray started the 2025 season with a fifth-place finish at Daytona. He stayed consistent enough to make the playoffs. Gray was eliminated following the Round of 12, but he later scored his first career win at Martinsville.

On January 6, 2026, JGR announced that Gray will return to the team and run their No. 54 car for a second year. Gray started the 2026 season with a 28th-place DNF at Daytona. He earned a pole at Phoenix. He also scored a win at Kansas.

==== Car No. 54 results ====
Year	Driver	No.	Make	1	2	3	4	5	6	7	8	9	10	11	12	13	14	15	16	17	18	19	20	21	22	23	24	25	26	27	28	29	30	31	32	33	Owners	Pts
2013	Kyle Busch	54	Toyota	DAY; 32	PHO; 1*	LVS; 2	BRI; 1*	CAL; 1*	TEX; 1*	RCH; 3		DAR; 1*	CLT; 1*	DOV; 5*		MCH; 4		KEN; 5*	DAY; 11	NHA; 1*		IND; 1*		GLN; 24		BRI; 1*	ATL; 2	RCH; 4	CHI; 1*		DOV; 8	KAN; 4	CLT; 1	TEX; 26	PHO; 1*	HOM; 3	2nd	1294
2013	Joey Coulter	54	Toyota								TAL; 21										CHI; 14																2nd	1294
2013	Drew Herring	54	Toyota												IOW; 11								IOW; 6							KEN; 6							2nd	1294
2013	Owen Kelly	54	Toyota														ROA; 4								MOH; 23												2nd	1294
2014	Kyle Busch	54	Toyota	DAY; 4*	PHO; 1*	LVS; 2	BRI; 1	CAL; 3	TEX; 2	DAR; 4*	RCH; 3			CLT; 3	DOV; 1*	MCH; 4		KEN; 3	DAY; 17	NHA; 2		IND; 2		GLN; 2		BRI; 2*	ATL; 4	RCH; 1**	CHI; 3*		DOV; 1*	KAN; 1	CLT; 2	TEX; 1*	PHO; 2*	HOM; 2	2nd	1324
2014	Sam Hornish Jr.	54	Toyota									TAL; 5	IOW; 1*				ROA; 12*				CHI; 36		IOW; 4		MOH; 30					KEN; 30							2nd	1324
2015	Kyle Busch	54	Toyota	DAY; 26												MCH; 1			KEN; 3*	NHA; 4	IND; 1*				BRI; 1		DAR; 2	RCH; 2	CHI; 1*		DOV; 3*	CLT; 31*	KAN; 1	TEX; 14	PHO; 1*	HOM; 30	2nd	1191
2015	Erik Jones	54	Toyota		ATL; 13		PHO; 5				RCH; 4				DOV; 9*		CHI; 1*	DAY; 8				IOW; 7								KEN; 8							2nd	1191
2015	Denny Hamlin	54	Toyota			LVS; 4		CAL; 18	TEX; 7	BRI; 31				CLT; 2																							2nd	1191
2015	Boris Said	54	Toyota									TAL; 16	IOW; 26										GLN; 4	MOH; 13		ROA; 6											2nd	1191
2020	Kyle Busch	54	Toyota	DAY	LVS	CAL	PHO; 3*	DAR; 2	CLT; 1*	BRI	ATL	HOM	HOM	TAL	POC	IND	KEN	KEN	TEX; 37	KAN	ROA	DAY	DOV	DOV	DAY		RCH; 3	RCH	BRI	LVS	TAL	CLT	KAN	TEX	MAR	PHO	37th	257
2020	Denny Hamlin	54	Toyota																							DAR; 5											37th	257
2021	Ty Dillon	54	Toyota	DAY; 14		HOM; 37	LVS; 31				TAL; 35																										2nd	4031
2021	Ty Gibbs	54	Toyota		DRC; 1			PHO; 2		MAR; 4		DAR; 18	DOV; 5		CLT; 1	MOH; 3			POC; 2				GLN; 1*	IRC; 19	MCH; 13			RCH; 7*	BRI; 11	LVS; 11		ROV; 21		KAN; 1	MAR; 27		2nd	4031
2021	Kyle Busch	54	Toyota											COA; 1*			TEX; 1*	NSH; 1*		ROA; 1	ATL; 1*																2nd	4031
2021	Denny Hamlin	54	Toyota																								DAR; 12*										2nd	4031
2021	Martin Truex Jr.	54	Toyota						ATL; 2*																												2nd	4031
2021	Christopher Bell	54	Toyota																			NHA; 1*				DAY; 6											2nd	4031
2021	John Hunter Nemechek	54	Toyota																												TAL; 22		TEX; 1*			PHO; 6	2nd	4031
2022	Ty Gibbs	54	Toyota	DAY; 11	CAL; 13	LVS; 1	PHO; 6	ATL; 1	COA; 15	RCH; 1	MAR; 8*	TAL; 35	DOV; 3	DAR; 16	TEX; 12	CLT; 2	PIR; 7*	NSH; 4	ROA; 1	ATL; 35	NHA; 21*	POC; 2	IRC; 8	MCH; 1*	GLN; 27	DAY; 7	DAR; 6	KAN; 3*	BRI; 36	TEX; 3	TAL; 7	ROV; 2	LVS; 4	HOM; 2	MAR; 1*	PHO; 1*	1st	4040
2025	Taylor Gray	54	Toyota	DAY; 5	ATL; 38	COA; 7	PHO; 6	LVS; 19	HOM; 23	MAR; 29	DAR; 33	BRI; 19	CAR; 5	TAL; 11	TEX; 2	CLT; 30	NSH; 25	MEX; 2	POC; 9	ATL; 5	CSC; 34	SON; 7	DOV; 7	IND; 3	IOW; 17	GLN; 18	DAY; 30	PIR; 14	GTW; 17	BRI; 14	KAN; 6	ROV; 13	LVS; 8	TAL; 31	MAR; 1*	PHO; 7	8th	2227
2026	Taylor Gray	54	Toyota	DAY; 28	ATL; 9	COA; 12	PHO; 15	LVS; 37	DAR; 15	MAR; 13	ROC; 7	BRI; 10	KAN; 1	TAL; 29	TEX; 33	GLN; 3	DOV; 32	CLT; 31	NSH; 9	POC; 17	COR; 2*	SON; 29	CHI; 7	ATL; 33	IND; 12	IOW; 7	DAY; 26	DAR; 7	GTW; 4	BRI; 6	LVS; 5	CLT; 9	PHO; 28	TAL; 21	MAR; 10	HOM; 14	13th	884

=== Car No. 81 history ===
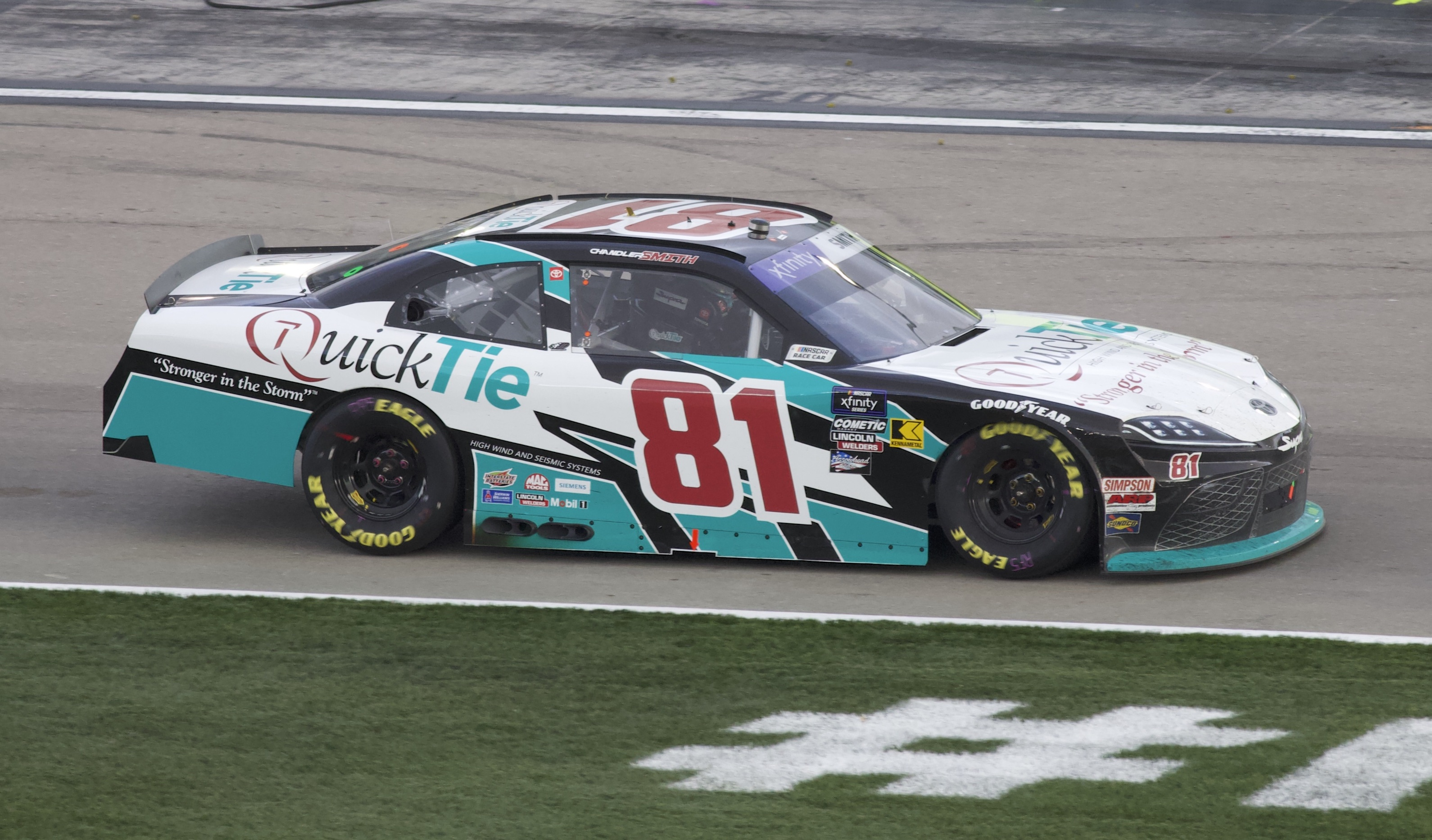
Smith's No. 81 car at Las Vegas Motor Speedway in 2024.

The No. 81 car made its debut in 2021 as the fifth JGR entry at Road America. It was driven by Ty Gibbs while Kyle Busch occupied Gibbs' usual No. 54.

The No. 81 returned full-time in 2024 with Chandler Smith behind the wheel. Smith started the season with a fifth place finish at Daytona. He later scored wins at Phoenix and Richmond. At the end of the season, Smith parted ways with JGR.

==== Car No. 81 results ====
Year	Driver	No.	Make	1	2	3	4	5	6	7	8	9	10	11	12	13	14	15	16	17	18	19	20	21	22	23	24	25	26	27	28	29	30	31	32	33	Owners	Pts
2021	Ty Gibbs	81	Toyota	DAY	DAY	HOM	LVS	PHO	ATL	MAR	TAL	DAR	DOV	COA	CLT	MOH	TEX	NSH	POC	ROA; 33	ATL	NHA	GLN	IND	MCH	DAY	DAR	RCH	BRI	LVS	TAL	CLT	TEX	KAN	MAR	PHO	48th	8
2024	Chandler Smith	81	Toyota	DAY; 5	ATL; 2	LVS; 3	PHO; 1*	COA; 8	RCH; 1	MAR; 3	TEX; 15	TAL; 25	DOV; 7	DAR; 12	CLT; 18	PIR; 35	SON; 8	IOW; 8*	NHA; 15	NSH; 2	CSC; 38	POC; 15	IND; 33	MCH; 27	DAY; 2	DAR; 8	ATL; 4	GLN; 4	BRI; 3	KAN; 3*	TAL; 5	ROV; 5	LVS; 4	HOM; 13	MAR; 3	PHO; 5	5th	2314
