= Colby Howard =

American racing driver

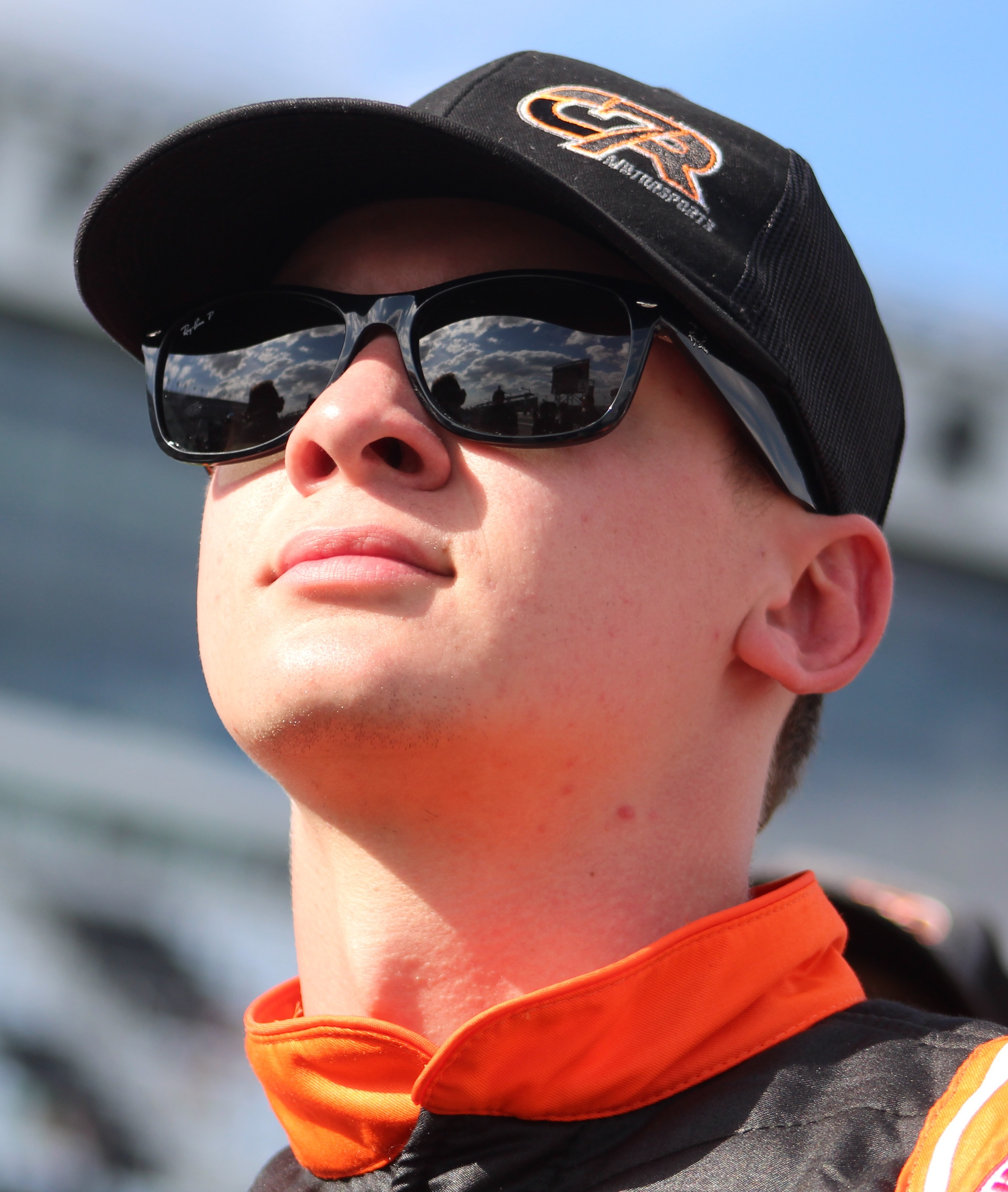
- Howard at Daytona International Speedway in 2023
- Born: Colby A. Howard; October 28, 2001 (age 25); Simpsonville, South Carolina, U.S.

NASCAR O'Reilly Auto Parts Series career
- 43 races run over 2 years
- 2021 position: 32nd
- Best finish: 29th (2020)
- First race: 2020 LS Tractor 200 (Phoenix)
- Last race: 2021 Sport Clips Haircuts VFW 200 (Darlington)
Wins	Top tens	Poles
0	0	0

NASCAR FedEx Freight Truck Series career
- 54 races run over 5 years
- 2024 position: 41st
- Best finish: 17th (2022)
- First race: 2019 Lucas Oil 150 (Phoenix)
- Last race: 2024 Toyota 200 (Gateway)
Wins	Top tens	Poles
0	5	0

ARCA Menards Series career
- 5 races run over 3 years
- Best finish: 49th (2019)
- First race: 2018 Kentuckiana Ford Dealers ARCA 200 (Salem)
- Last race: 2022 Dawn 150 (Mid-Ohio)
Wins	Top tens	Poles
0	4	0

ARCA Menards Series West career
- 1 race run over 1 year
- Best finish: 48th (2022)
- First race: 2022 General Tire 200 (Sonoma)
Wins	Top tens	Poles
0	1	0
- Statistics up to date as of November 8, 2024.

Colby A. Howard (born October 28, 2001) is an American professional stock car racing driver. He last competed part-time in the NASCAR Craftsman Truck Series, driving the No. 1 Toyota Tundra TRD Pro for Tricon Garage.

== Racing career ==
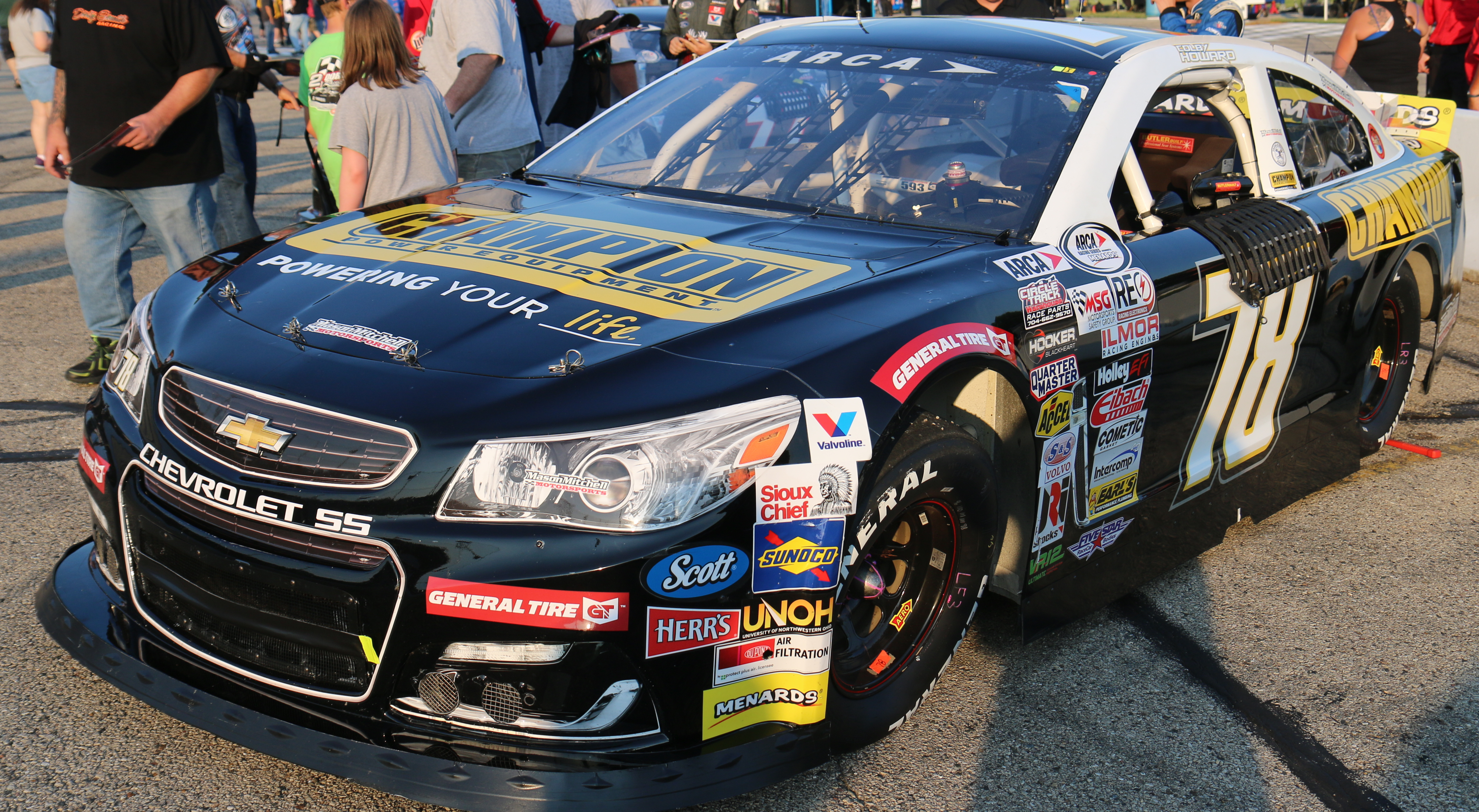
Howard's 2018 ARCA car at Madison

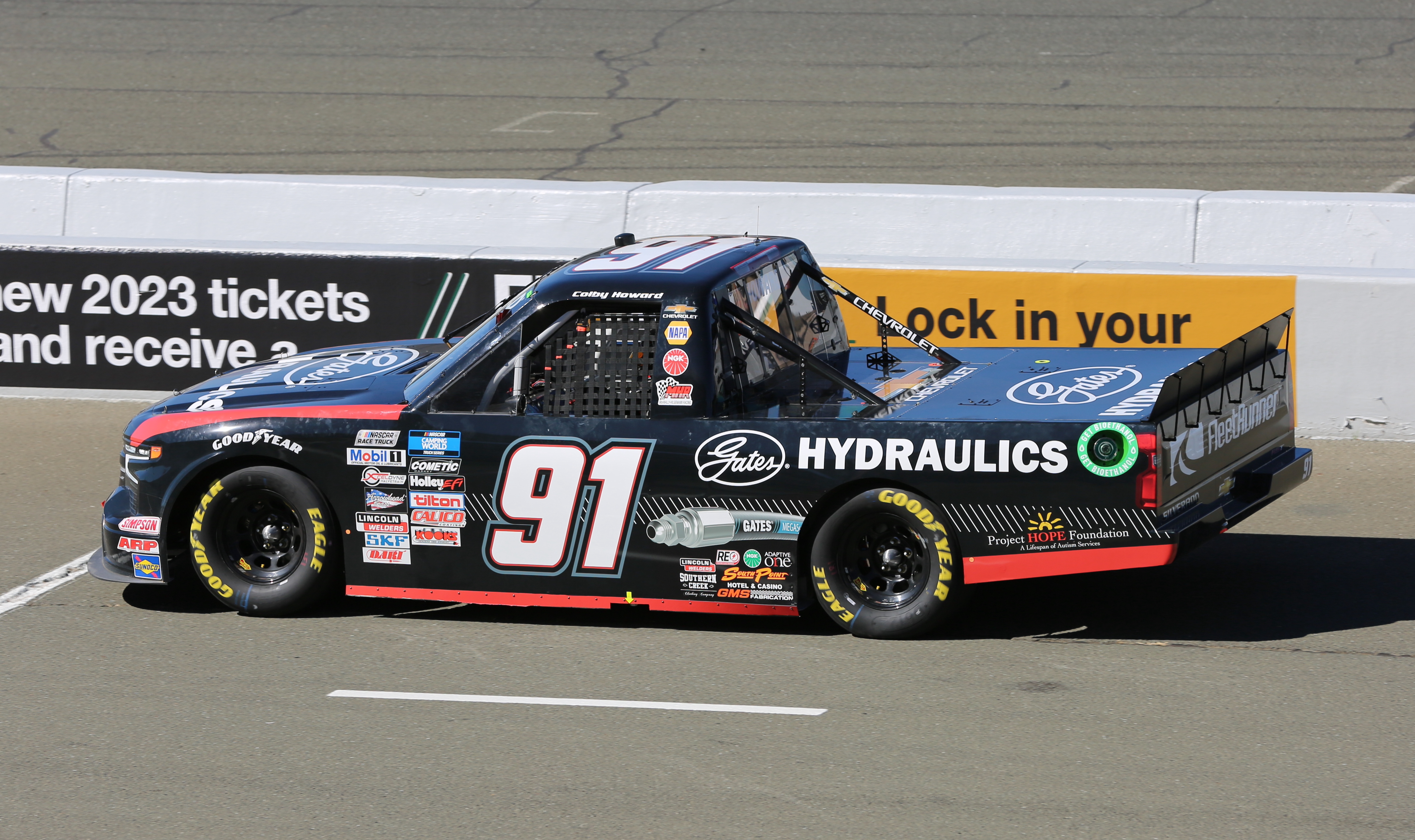
Howard's No. 91 truck at Sonoma Raceway in 2022

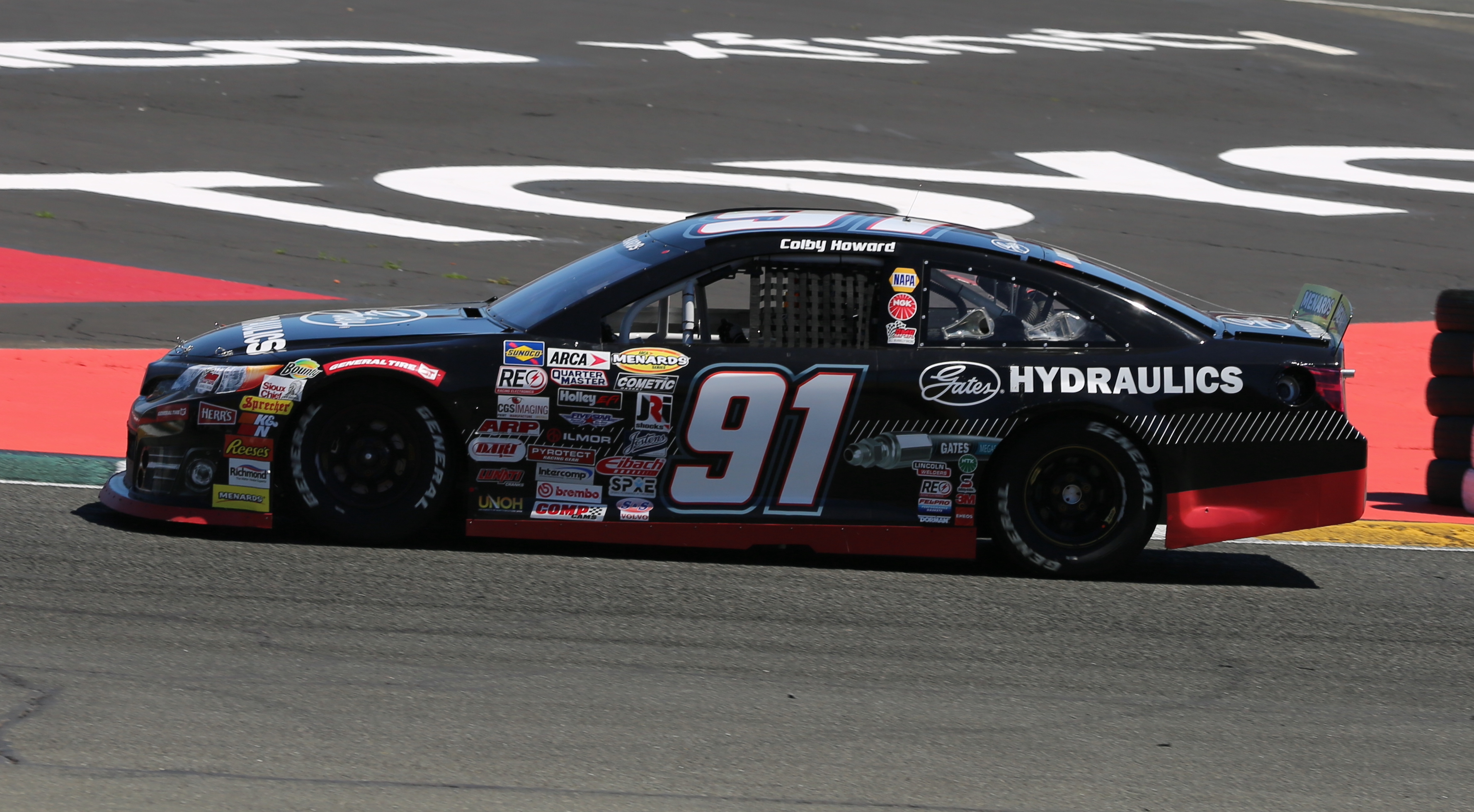
Howard's No. 91 car in the ARCA Menards Series West race at Sonoma Raceway in 2022

Howard started racing at six years old, racing dirt bikes. He raced bikes for six years until a broken leg and collarbone ended his career. After that, Howard raced Bandoleros and late models before moving to full-bodied stock cars.

In November 2019, Howard joined Young's Motorsports for the final two races of the 2019 NASCAR Gander Outdoors Truck Series season starting with the Lucas Oil 150 at ISM Raceway.

On January 9, 2020, it was announced that Howard would join JD Motorsports for twenty races in the 2020 NASCAR Xfinity Series season. When Howard was choosing his team for 2020, he had a few offers to run full-time in the NASCAR Gander RV & Outdoors Truck Series, but chose the part-time Xfinity ride with JDM in an effort to get to the NASCAR Cup Series faster.

For 2021, Howard remained in the No. 15 for JD Motorsports with returning primary sponsorship from the Project Hope Foundation but ran the full season. Also, Wayne Carroll Jr. moved from the No. 6 JDM car to crew chief Howard in the No. 15 in 2021, replacing Mark Setzer, who left the team to be the crew chief for the No. 51 of Jeremy Clements and his team. Setzer crew chiefed Howard in all his starts in 2020 except for Talladega in October 2020, when Carroll was his crew chief instead.

For 2022, Howard left the Xfinity Series to compete full-time for McAnally–Hilgemann Racing in the NASCAR Camping World Truck Series.

On February 7, 2023, it was announced that Howard would drive the No. 9 truck full-time for CR7 Motorsports in the Truck Series in 2023. He drove the same truck part-time in 2021.

Howard scored a career-best fourth-place finish in the 2023 NextEra Energy 250 at Daytona.

== Personal life ==
Howard is a third-generation racing driver; his grandfather earned track championships at Greenville-Pickens Speedway and his father Rodney Howard is a former NASCAR Busch Series driver.

== Motorsports career results ==
=== Stock car career summary ===
Season	Series	Team	Races	Wins	Top 5	Top 10	Points	Position
2016	CARS Late Model Stock Car Tour	Colby Howard	1	0	0	1	57	45th
2017	CARS Late Model Stock Car Tour	Rodney Howard	1	0	0	0	11	66th
2018	CARS Late Model Stock Car Tour	Rodney Howard	1	0	0	0	23	45th
2018	ARCA Racing Series	Mason Mitchell Motorsports	2	0	0	2	375	60th
2019	ARCA Menards Series	Win-Tron Racing	2	0	0	2	360	49th
2019	NASCAR Gander Outdoors Truck Series	Young's Motorsports	2	0	0	0	29	61st
2020	NASCAR Xfinity Series	JD Motorsports	22	0	0	0	267	29th
2021	NASCAR Camping World Truck Series	CR7 Motorsports	3	0	0	0	0	NC†
2021	NASCAR Xfinity Series	JD Motorsports	21	0	0	0	225	32nd
2022	ARCA Menards Series West	Bill McAnally Racing	1	0	1	1	42	48th
2022	ARCA Menards Series	Bill McAnally Racing	1	0	0	0	27	99th
2022	NASCAR Camping World Truck Series	McAnally–Hilgemann Racing	23	0	0	3	422	17th
2023	CARS Late Model Stock Car Tour	CR7 Motorsports	1	0	0	0	14	67th
2023	NASCAR Craftsman Truck Series	CR7 Motorsports	23	0	1	1	340	21st
2024	ASA STARS National Tour	Wilson Motorsports	1	0	0	1	57	45th
2024	NASCAR Craftsman Truck Series	Tricon Garage	3	0	0	1	55	41st
2025	ASA STARS National Tour	Anthony Campi Racing	4	1	2	3	278	17th
2026	IHRA Late Model Sportsman Series	Neil Meredith	1	0	0	1	0	N/A
2026	ASA STARS National Tour	Lyon Racing	2	0	0	1		

^{†} As Howard was a guest driver, he was ineligible for championship points.

=== NASCAR ===
(key) (Bold – Pole position awarded by qualifying time. Italics – Pole position earned by points standings or practice time. * – Most laps led.)

==== Xfinity Series ====
NASCAR Xfinity Series results
Year	Team	No.	Make	1	2	3	4	5	6	7	8	9	10	11	12	13	14	15	16	17	18	19	20	21	22	23	24	25	26	27	28	29	30	31	32	33	NXSC	Pts	Ref
2020	JD Motorsports	15	Chevy	DAY	LVS	CAL	PHO; 34	DAR; 27	CLT; 37	BRI; 19	ATL; 15	HOM; 17	HOM; 17	TAL	POC	IRC	KEN; 32	KEN; 21	TEX; 23	KAN	ROA	DRC	DOV; 30	DOV; 26	DAY; 12	DAR; 19	RCH; 33	RCH; 35	BRI; 21	LVS; 21	TAL; 36	ROV	KAN	TEX; 28	MAR; 25	PHO; 20	29th	267	
2021	JD Motorsports	15	Chevy	DAY; 35	DRC; 23	HOM; 36	LVS; 20	PHO; 16	ATL; 21	MAR; 39	TAL; 19	DAR; 29	DOV; 28	COA; 28	CLT; 30	MOH; 22	TEX; 28	NSH; DNQ	POC; 24	ROA; DNQ	ATL; 20	NHA; 30	GLN; 31	IRC	MCH; 25	DAY; 26	DAR; 27	RCH	BRI	LVS	TAL	ROV	TEX	KAN	MAR	PHO	32nd	225	

==== Craftsman Truck Series ====
NASCAR Craftsman Truck Series results
Year	Team	No.	Make	1	2	3	4	5	6	7	8	9	10	11	12	13	14	15	16	17	18	19	20	21	22	23	NCTC	Pts	Ref
2019	Young's Motorsports	20	Chevy	DAY	ATL	LVS	MAR	TEX	DOV	KAN	CLT	TEX	IOW	GTW	CHI	KEN	POC	ELD	MCH	BRI	MSP	LVS	TAL	MAR	PHO; 21	HOM; 24	61st	29	
2021	CR7 Motorsports	9	Chevy	DAY	DRC	LVS	ATL	BRD	RCH	KAN	DAR	COA	CLT	TEX	NSH	POC	KNX	GLN	GTW	DAR; 13	BRI; 15	LVS	TAL	MAR; 38	PHO		104th	0^{1}	
2022	McAnally–Hilgemann Racing	91	Chevy	DAY; 30	LVS; 34	ATL; 26	COA; 24	MAR; 18	BRD; 12	DAR; 13	KAN; 11	TEX; 34	CLT; 14	GTW; 23	SON; 19	KNX; 16	NSH; 16	MOH; 9	POC; 18	IRP; 32	RCH; 28	KAN; 9	BRI; 24	TAL; 8	HOM; 13	PHO; 15	17th	422	
2023	CR7 Motorsports	9	Chevy	DAY; 4	LVS; 18	ATL; 27	COA; 24	TEX; 20	BRD; 27	MAR; 17	KAN; 35	DAR; 17	NWS; 24	CLT; 20	GTW; 12	NSH; 29	MOH; 36	POC; 15	RCH; 24	IRP; 35	MLW; 17	KAN; 19	BRI; 22	TAL; 23	HOM; 30	PHO; 21	21st	340	
2024	Tricon Garage	1	Toyota	DAY	ATL; 17	LVS	BRI	COA	MAR	TEX	KAN	DAR; 7	NWS	CLT	GTW; 32	NSH	POC	IRP	RCH	MLW	BRI	KAN	TAL	HOM	MAR	PHO	41st	55	

^{*} Season still in progress
^{1} Ineligible for series points

=== ARCA Menards Series ===
(key) (Bold – Pole position awarded by qualifying time. Italics – Pole position earned by points standings or practice time. * – Most laps led.)

ARCA Menards Series results
Year	Team	No.	Make	1	2	3	4	5	6	7	8	9	10	11	12	13	14	15	16	17	18	19	20	AMSC	Pts	Ref
2018	Mason Mitchell Motorsports	78	Chevy	DAY	NSH	SLM; 8	TAL	TOL	CLT	POC	MCH	MAD; 9	GTW	CHI	IOW	ELK	BLN	POC	ISF	DSF	IRP	SLM	KAN	60th	375	
2019	Win-Tron Racing	32	Chevy	DAY	FIF	SLM	TAL	NSH	TOL	CLT	POC	MCH	MAD	GTW	CHI	ELK	IOW; 10	POC	ISF	DSF	SLM; 10	IRP	KAN	49th	360	
2022	Bill McAnally Racing	91	Toyota	DAY	PHO	TAL	KAN	CLT	IOW	BLN	ELK	MOH; 17	POC	IRP	MCH	GLN	ISF	MLW	DSF	KAN	BRI	SLM	TOL	99th	27	

==== ARCA Menards Series West ====
ARCA Menards Series West results
Year	Team	No.	Make	1	2	3	4	5	6	7	8	9	10	11	AMSWC	Pts	Ref
2022	Bill McAnally Racing	91	Toyota	PHO	IRW	KCR	PIR	SON; 2	IRW	EVG	PIR	AAS	LVS	PHO	48th	42	

=== CARS Late Model Stock Car Tour ===
(key) (Bold – Pole position awarded by qualifying time. Italics – Pole position earned by points standings or practice time. * – Most laps led. ** – All laps led.)

CARS Late Model Stock Car Tour results
Year	Team	No.	Make	1	2	3	4	5	6	7	8	9	10	11	12	13	14	15	16	CLMSCTC	Pts	Ref
2016	Colby Howard	16H	Ford	SNM	ROU	HCY	TCM	GRE; 9	ROU	CON	MYB	HCY	SNM							44th	24	
2017	Rodney Howard	16H	Ford	CON; 22	DOM	DOM	HCY	HCY	BRI	AND	ROU	TCM	ROU	HCY	CON	SBO				66th	11	
2018	Rodney Howard	16H	Ford	TCM; DNQ	MYB; 12	ROU	HCY	BRI	ACE	CCS	KPT	HCY	WKS	ROU	SBO					45th	23	
2023	CR7 Motorsports	97A	Chevy	SNM	FLC	HCY; 19	ACE	NWS	LGY	DOM	CRW	HCY	ACE	TCM	WKS	AAS	SBO	TCM	CRW	67th	14	

=== ASA STARS National Tour ===
(key) (Bold – Pole position awarded by qualifying time. Italics – Pole position earned by points standings or practice time. * – Most laps led. ** – All laps led.)

ASA STARS National Tour results
Year	Team	No.	Make	1	2	3	4	5	6	7	8	9	10	11	12	ASNTC	Pts	Ref
2024	Wilson Motorsports	24	Toyota	NSM	FIF; 8	HCY	MAD	MLW	AND	OWO	TOL	WIN	NSV			45th	57	
2025	Anthony Campi Racing	18	Chevy	NSM; 15	FIF; 5	DOM	**HCY**; 1*	NPS; 6	MAD	SLG	AND	OWO	TOL	WIN	NSV	17th	278	
2026	Lyon Racing	44H	Toyota	NSM	FIF	HCY; 11	SLG	MAD	NPS; 9	OWO	TRI	WIN	NSV	NSM		-*	-*	

=== IHRA Late Model Sportsman Series ===
(key) (Bold – Pole position awarded by qualifying time. Italics – Pole position earned by points standings or practice time. * – Most laps led. ** – All laps led.)

IHRA Late Model Sportsman Series
Year	Team	No.	Make	1	2	3	ISCSS	Pts	Ref
2026	Neil Meredith	16H	N/A	DUB	CDL	AND; 10	N/A	0	
