= Dexter Bean =

American racing driver & crew chief (born 1987)

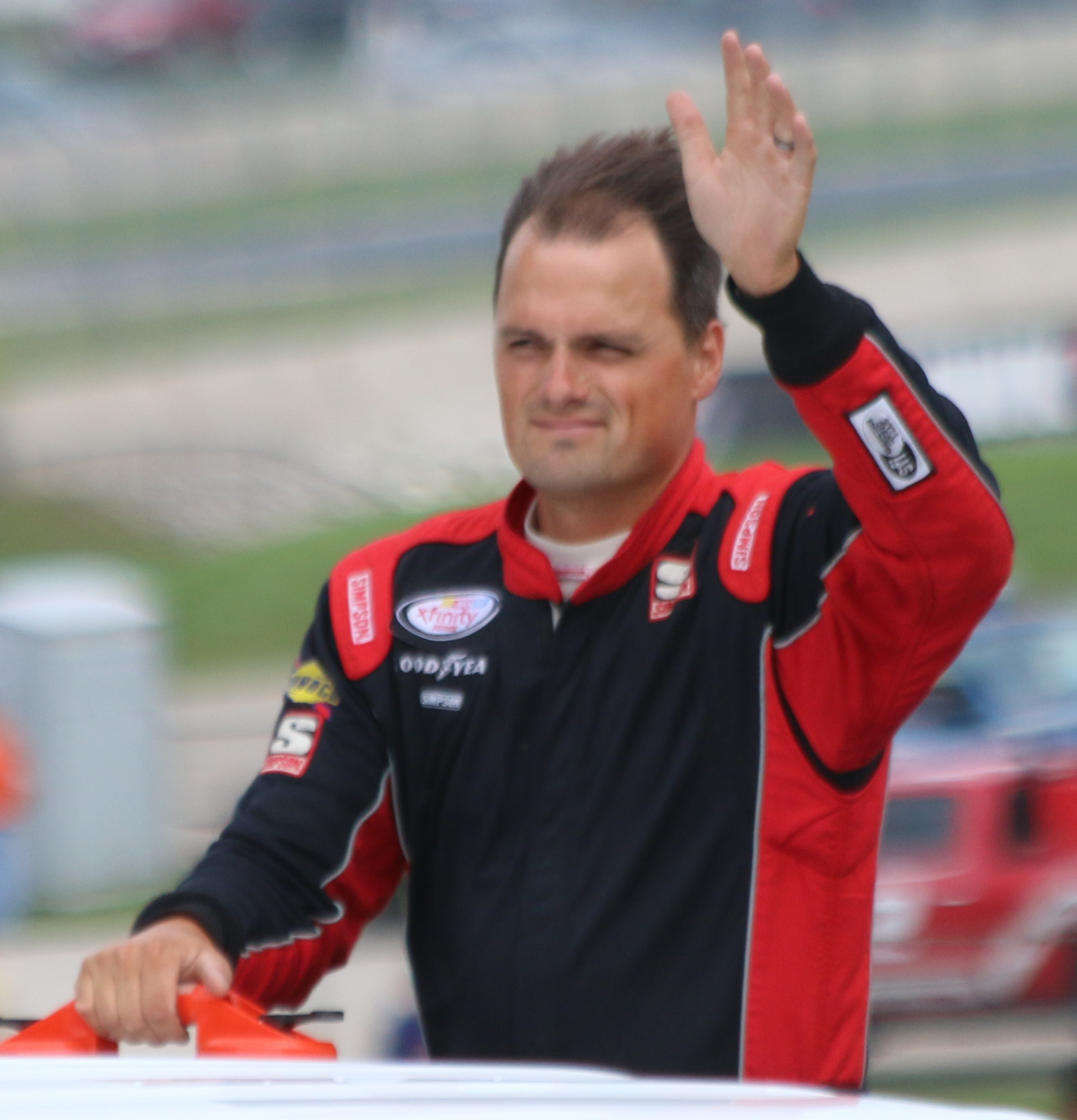
- Bean at Road America in 2017
- Born: Dexter John Bean; January 5, 1987 (age 39); Westby, Wisconsin, U.S.

NASCAR Cup Series career
- 1 race run over 1 year
- 2009 position: 63rd
- Best finish: 63rd (2009)
- First race: 2009 Pocono 500 (Pocono)
Wins	Top tens	Poles
0	0	0

NASCAR O'Reilly Auto Parts Series career
- 32 races run over 10 years
- 2026 position: 60th
- Best finish: 41st (2020)
- First race: 2006 Sam's Town 250 (Memphis)
- Last race: 2026 MillerTech Battery 250 (Pocono)
Wins	Top tens	Poles
0	0	0

NASCAR FedEx Freight Truck Series career
- 4 races run over 2 years
- 2024 position: 88th
- Best finish: 58th (2009)
- First race: 2009 AAA Insurance 200 (Dover)
- Last race: 2024 LiUNA! 175 (Milwaukee)
Wins	Top tens	Poles
0	0	0

ARCA Menards Series career
- 70 races run over 4 years
- Best finish: 3rd (2007)
- First race: 2005 Advance Discount Auto Parts 200 (Daytona)
- Last race: 2008 Hantz Group 200 by Belle Tire & Federated Car Care (Toledo)
Wins	Top tens	Poles
0	23	1
- Statistics up to date as of November 7, 2026.

Dexter John Bean (born January 5, 1987) is an American professional stock car racing driver and crew chief. He last competed part-time in the NASCAR O'Reilly Auto Parts Series, driving the No. 91 Chevrolet Camaro SS for DGM Racing with Jesse Iwuji Motorsports, and also crew chiefs for the team on occasion. He also last competed part-time in the NASCAR Craftsman Truck Series, driving the No. 02 Chevrolet Silverado for Young's Motorsports. He has also previously competed part-time in both the NASCAR Cup Series in 2009. Prior to competing in those series, he ran full-time for three years (as well as part-time in a fourth) in what is now the ARCA Menards Series, where he finished third in the standings in 2007.

== Racing career ==
=== Early career ===
Bean began his racing career at the age of ten in go-karts, and switched to stock cars at the age of sixteen, driving for family-owned BlackJack Racing; the team was named after Bean's father, David, used his winnings from a gambling trip to Las Vegas to start the team. After competing in late model competition at LaCrosse Fairgrounds Speedway, Bean moved to regional touring competition in the Wisconsin Challenge Series and the NASCAR AutoZone Elite Series Midwest Division.

=== 2005–2008: ARCA and Busch Series ===
Bean made his debut in what was then the ARCA Re/Max Series in the season-opener at Daytona in 2005, driving for Andy Hillenburg in his No. 10 Fast Track Racing Enterprises Pontiac. Later in the year, his family would start their own team, BlackJack Racing, and Bean competed for them between 2005 and 2007. Bean posted a best points finish of third at the end of the 2007 season. Bean also tested a NASCAR Craftsman Truck Series truck for Germain Racing in 2007, but never made any starts.

Having run a single NASCAR Busch Series race for Spraker Racing Enterprises in 2006, Bean rejoined Spraker's team for the 2008 ARCA season, driving the No. 37 Glock Chevrolet. However, he dropped to eleventh in points that year.

=== 2009: NASCAR Cup and Truck Series ===
For the 2009 season, Bean moved to the NASCAR Sprint Cup Series with his family-owned team, attempting to run for the series' Rookie of the Year award. After failing to qualify for races at Las Vegas Motor Speedway and Phoenix International Raceway, Bean qualified the No. 51 Dodge for the Pocono 500 at Pocono Raceway, starting 41st and finishing 36th, four laps behind race winner Tony Stewart. Bean failed to qualify for races at New Hampshire Motor Speedway and Chicagoland Speedway later in the year. Bean also ran three Craftsman Truck Series races in 2009, driving trucks for Mario Gosselin in events at Dover International Speedway and The Milwaukee Mile, and for Tagsby Racing at Gateway International Raceway, posting a best finish of 17th at Milwaukee.

=== 2015–present: Second stint in NASCAR ===
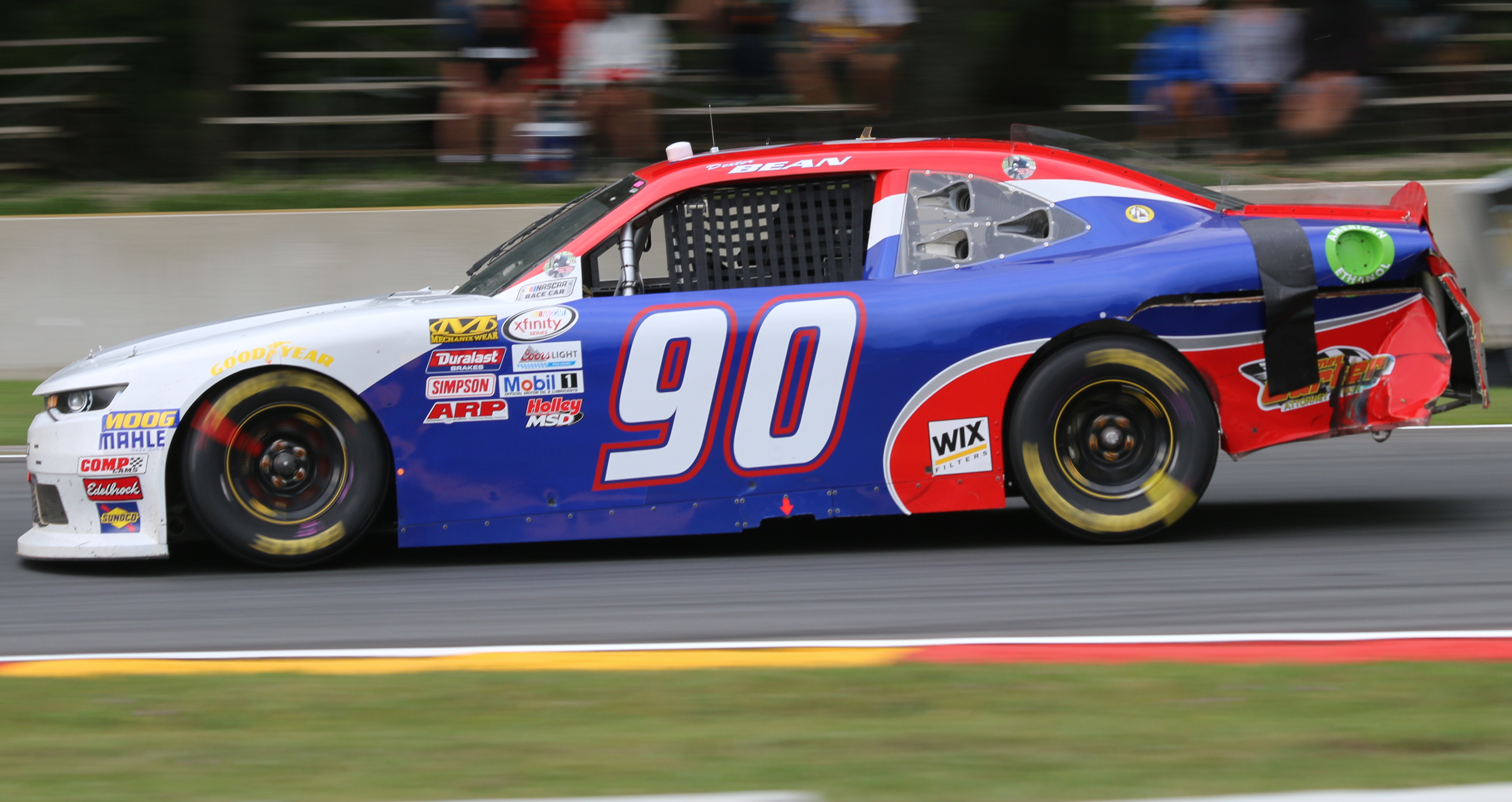
Bean's 2017 Xfinity Series car at Road America, his home track

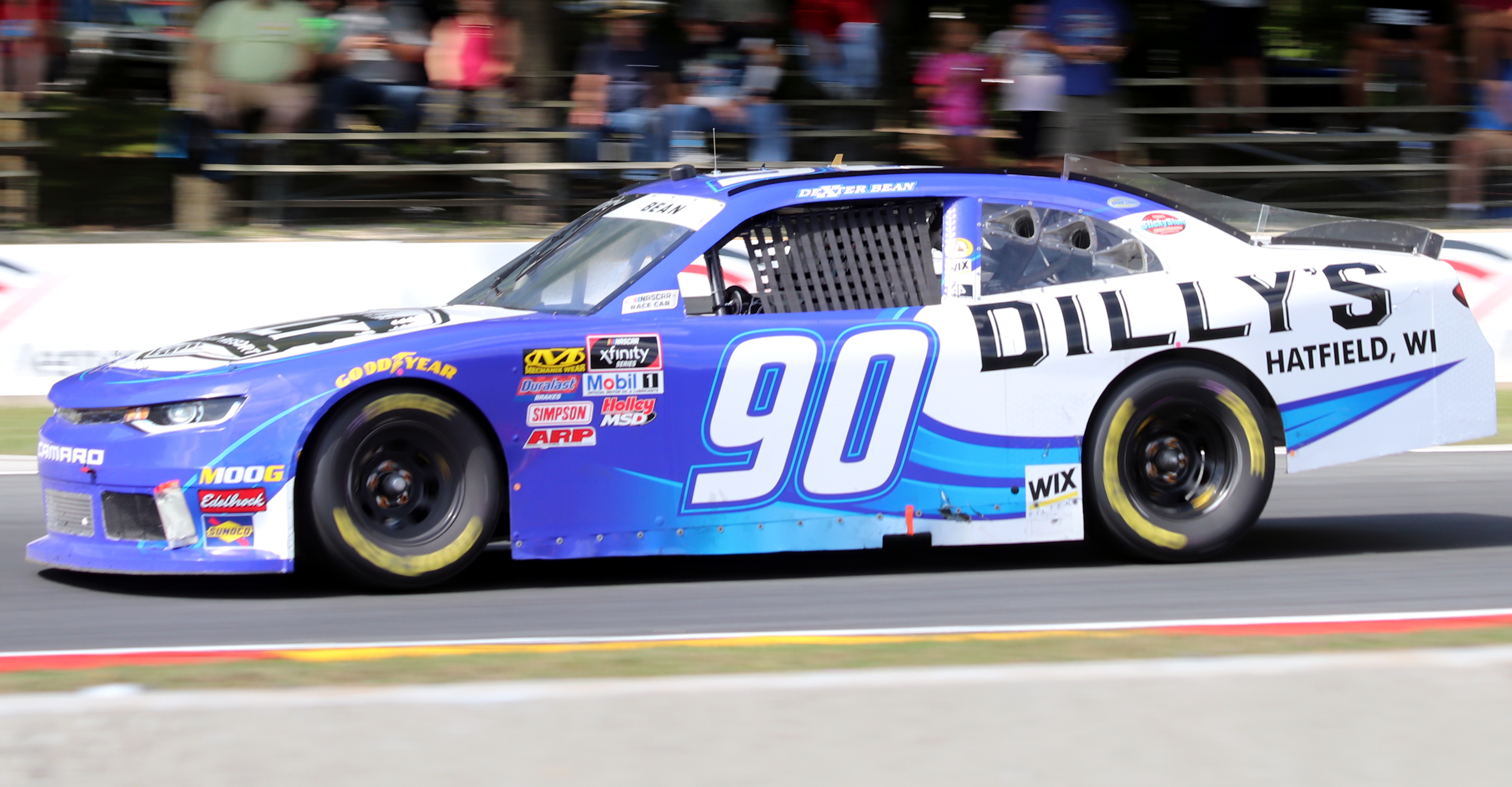
Bean's 2019 Road America car

After being without a ride in any NASCAR series for five years (2010 through 2014), Bean returned to the sport in 2015, driving the No. 92 for Mario Gosselin's team in what became the NASCAR Xfinity Series at the season-opening race at Daytona. Martin Roy was originally supposed to drive that car that weekend, but was injured in a skiing accident over the offseason, so Gosselin called up Bean, the husband of his wife's sister, to drive his second car. Bean had previously driven for Gosselin's team part-time in 2009 in the Truck Series when they fielded an entry, the No. 12 truck, in that series. He made his second attempt of the season at Las Vegas Motor Speedway but failed to qualify. However, Bean was called to replace Joey Gase in the No. 52 Jimmy Means Racing Chevy after Gase suffered food poisoning prior to the race; Gase started the race, and Bean took over during the event.

In 2019, Bean announced his return to Xfinity competition at Road America. driving the DGM Racing No. 90 Chevrolet.

On August 17, 2023, it was revealed that Bean would attempt to qualify for the Truck Series race at Milwaukee, driving a No. 21 truck for his own team, BlackJack Racing, in the team's first attempt in a NASCAR race since 2009 when it fielded a part-time Cup Series entry. Bean also ran the last Truck Series race at Milwaukee (which is in his home state of Wisconsin) in 2009, which was also the last year he ran a Truck Series race.

On August 20, 2024, Young's Motorsports announced that Bean drove the No. 02 Silverado at the Milwaukee Mile.

On June 8, 2026, it was revealed Bean would return to the now NASCAR O'Reilly Auto Parts Series at Pocono Raceway, driving the No. 91 for DGM Racing with Jesse Iwuji Motorsports.

== Personal life ==
Bean was born in Westby, Wisconsin on January 5, 1987. He has type 1 diabetes. Bean is married to Misty McCrary. Together they have three daughters, Marley Mae, born in November 2013, Moxley Drew, born in November 2015, and Maizley James in November 2023. Bean is also the brother-in-law of Mario Gosselin, who he has driven for part-time in both the Truck (2009) and Xfinity Series (since 2015).

== Motorsports career results ==
=== NASCAR ===
(key) (Bold – Pole position awarded by qualifying time. Italics – Pole position earned by points standings or practice time. * – Most laps led.)

==== Sprint Cup Series ====
NASCAR Sprint Cup Series results
Year	Team	No.	Make	1	2	3	4	5	6	7	8	9	10	11	12	13	14	15	16	17	18	19	20	21	22	23	24	25	26	27	28	29	30	31	32	33	34	35	36	NSCC	Pts	Ref
2009	BlackJack Racing	51	Dodge	DAY	CAL	LVS; DNQ	ATL	BRI	MAR	TEX	PHO; DNQ	TAL	RCH	DAR	CLT	DOV	POC; 36	MCH	SON	NHA; DNQ	DAY	CHI; DNQ	IND	POC	GLN	MCH	BRI	ATL	RCH	NHA; DNQ	DOV	KAN	CAL	CLT	MAR	TAL	TEX	PHO	HOM	63rd	55	

==== O'Reilly Auto Parts Series ====
NASCAR O'Reilly Auto Parts Series results
Year	Team	No.	Make	1	2	3	4	5	6	7	8	9	10	11	12	13	14	15	16	17	18	19	20	21	22	23	24	25	26	27	28	29	30	31	32	33	34	35	NOAPSC	Pts	Ref
2006	Jay Robinson Racing	49	Ford	DAY	CAL	MXC	LVS	ATL	BRI	TEX	NSH	PHO	TAL	RCH	DAR	CLT	DOV	NSH	KEN	MLW	DAY	CHI	NHA	MAR	GTW	IRP	GLN	MCH; DNQ	BRI	CAL	RCH	DOV	KAN	CLT					129th	67	
2006	Spraker Racing Enterprises	63	Ford																																MEM; 32	TEX	PHO	HOM	129th	67	
2015	King Autosport	92	Chevy	DAY; 40	ATL	LVS; DNQ	PHO	CAL	TEX	BRI	RCH	TAL	IOW	CLT	DOV	MCH	CHI	DAY; 40	KEN	NHA	IND	IOW	GLN	MOH	BRI	ROA	DAR	RCH	CHI; 39	KEN	DOV; 38	CLT	KAN	TEX	PHO	HOM			71st	19	
2016	King Autosport	92	Chevy	DAY	ATL	LVS	PHO	CAL	TEX	BRI	RCH	TAL	DOV	CLT	POC	MCH	IOW; 36	DAY	KEN; 36	NHA	IND	IOW; DNQ	GLN	MOH	BRI	ROA	DAR; 38	RCH	CHI; 36										54th	36	
2016	King Autosport	90	Chevy																											KEN; 23	DOV	CLT	KAN	TEX	PHO	HOM			54th	36	
2017	King Autosport	90	Chevy	DAY	ATL	LVS	PHO	CAL	TEX	BRI	RCH	TAL	CLT	DOV	POC	MCH	IOW; 33	DAY	KEN	NHA	IND	IOW	GLN	MOH	BRI	ROA; 26	DAR	RCH	CHI										64th	16	
2017	King Autosport	92	Chevy																											KEN; 38	DOV	CLT; DNQ	KAN	TEX	PHO	HOM			64th	16	
2018	DGM Racing	92	Chevy	DAY	ATL	LVS	PHO	CAL	TEX	BRI	RCH	TAL	DOV	CLT	POC	MCH	IOW	CHI	DAY	KEN	NHA	IOW; 36	GLN	MOH	BRI	ROA	DAR	IND	LVS	RCH	ROV	DOV	KAN	TEX	PHO	HOM			81st	1	
2019	DGM Racing	90	Chevy	DAY	ATL	LVS	PHO	CAL	TEX	BRI	RCH	TAL	DOV	CLT	POC	MCH	IOW	CHI	DAY	KEN	NHA	IOW	GLN	MOH	BRI	ROA; 32	DAR	IND	LVS	RCH	ROV	DOV	KAN	TEX					78th	7	
2019	DGM Racing	92	Chevy																																PHO; 35	HOM			78th	7	
2020	DGM Racing	36	Chevy	DAY	LVS	CAL	PHO	DAR	CLT	BRI	ATL	HOM	HOM	TAL	POC; 11	IRC	KEN	KEN	TEX; 33	KAN; 35	ROA	DRC	DOV	DOV	DAY														41st	90	
2020	DGM Racing	90	Chevy																							DAR; 30	RCH; 31	RCH; 30	BRI; 28	LVS; 29	TAL	ROV	KAN; 16	TEX	MAR	PHO			41st	90	
2021	DGM Racing	90	Chevy	DAY	DRC	HOM; 17	LVS; 25	PHO; 29	ATL; 35	MAR	TAL	DAR	DOV	COA	CLT	MOH	TEX	NSH	POC	ROA	ATL	NHA; 27	GLN	IRC	MCH	DAY	DAR	RCH	BRI	LVS	TAL	ROV	TEX	KAN	MAR	PHO			49th	52	
2022	DGM Racing	90	Chevy	DAY	CAL; Wth	LVS	PHO	ATL	COA	RCH	MAR	TAL	DOV	DAR	TEX	CLT	PIR	NSH																					115th	0	
2022	DGM Racing	92	Chevy																ROA; DNQ	ATL	NHA	POC	IRC	MCH	GLN	DAY	DAR	KAN	BRI	TEX	TAL	ROV	LVS	HOM	MAR	PHO			115th	0	
2023	DGM Racing	91	Chevy	DAY	CAL	LVS	PHO	ATL	COA	RCH	MAR	TAL	DOV	DAR	CLT	PIR	SON	NSH	CSC; DNQ	ATL	NHA	POC	ROA	MCH	IRC	GLN	DAY	DAR	KAN	BRI	TEX	ROV	LVS	HOM	MAR	PHO			108th	0	
2024	DGM Racing	92	Chevy	DAY	ATL	LVS	PHO	COA	RCH	MAR; 20	TEX	TAL	DOV	DAR	CLT	PIR	SON	IOW	NHA	NSH	CSC	POC	IND	MCH	DAY	DAR	ATL	GLN	BRI	KAN	TAL	ROV	LVS	HOM	MAR	PHO			65th	17	
2026	DGM Racing with Jesse Iwuji Motorsports	91	Chevy	DAY	ATL	COA	PHO	LVS	DAR	MAR	CAR	BRI	KAN	TAL	TEX	GLN	DOV	CLT	NSH	POC; 30	COR	SON	CHI	ATL	IND	IOW	DAY	DAR	GTW	BRI	LVS	CLT	PHO	TAL	MAR	HOM			60th	7	

==== Craftsman Truck Series ====
NASCAR Craftsman Truck Series results
Year	Team	No.	Make	1	2	3	4	5	6	7	8	9	10	11	12	13	14	15	16	17	18	19	20	21	22	23	24	25	NCTC	Pts	Ref
2009	DGM Racing	12	Chevy	DAY	CAL	ATL	MAR	KAN	CLT	DOV; 27	TEX	MCH	MLW; 17	MEM	KEN	IRP	NSH	BRI	CHI	IOW									58th	282	
2009	Tagsby Racing	73	Chevy																		GTW; 25	NHA	LVS	MAR	TAL	TEX	PHO	HOM	58th	282	
2023	BlackJack Racing	21	Chevy	DAY	LVS	ATL	COA	TEX	BRD	MAR	KAN	DAR	NWS	CLT	GTW	NSH	MOH	POC	RCH	IRP	MLW; DNQ	KAN	BRI	TAL	HOM	PHO			114th	0^{1}	
2024	Young's Motorsports	02	Chevy	DAY	ATL	LVS	BRI	COA	MAR	TEX	KAN	DAR	NWS	CLT	GTW	NSH	POC	IRP	RCH	MLW; 30	BRI	KAN	TAL	HOM	MAR	PHO			88th	0^{1}	

^{*} Season still in progress
^{1} Ineligible for series points

=== ARCA Re/Max Series ===
(key) (Bold – Pole position awarded by qualifying time. Italics – Pole position earned by points standings or practice time. * – Most laps led.)

ARCA Re/Max Series results
Year	Team	No.	Make	1	2	3	4	5	6	7	8	9	10	11	12	13	14	15	16	17	18	19	20	21	22	23	ARMC	Pts	Ref
2005	Fast Track Racing	10	Pontiac	DAY; 25	NSH	SLM	KEN	TOL	LAN	MIL	POC	MCH	KAN	KEN	BLN	POC	GTW	LER	NSH								54th	635	
2005	BlackJack Racing	05	Chevy																	MCH; 9	ISF	TOL	DSF	CHI; 14	SLM		54th	635	
2005	BlackJack Racing	05	Pontiac																							TAL; 10	54th	635	
2006	BlackJack Racing	6	Chevy	DAY; DNQ	NSH; 15	SLM; 33	WIN; 23	KEN; 12	TOL; 24	POC; 36	MCH; 35	KAN; 28	KEN; 38	BLN; 12	POC; 4	GTW; 13	NSH; 35	MCH; 9	ISF; 13	MIL; 35	TOL; 24	DSF; 29	CHI; 4	**SLM**; 11	TAL; 10	IOW; 7	12th	4115	
2007	BlackJack Racing	6	Chevy	DAY; 16	USA; 28	NSH; 9	SLM; 2	KAN; 10	WIN; 8	KEN; 15	TOL; 17	IOW; 11	POC; 2	MCH; 12	BLN; 15	KEN; 20	POC; 7	NSH; 7	ISF; 5	MIL; 8	GTW; 33	DSF; 11	CHI; 7	SLM; 34	TAL; 26	TOL; 34	3rd	4890	
2008	Spraker Racing Enterprises	37	Chevy	DAY; 22	SLM; 22	IOW; 35	KAN; 19	CAR; 11	KEN; 22	TOL; 3	POC; 7	MCH; 9	CAY; 4	KEN; 23	BLN; 16	POC; 33	NSH; 18	ISF; 32	DSF; 4	CHI; 27	SLM; 3	NJE; 14	TAL; 24	TOL; 21			11th	4285	
