= 2023 Clean Harbors 175 =

18th race of the 2023 NASCAR Craftsman Truck Series

Race details
- Race 18 of 23 of the 2023 NASCAR Craftsman Truck Series
- Date: August 27, 2023
- Official name: First Annual Clean Harbors 175
- Location: Milwaukee Mile, West Allis, Wisconsin
- Course: Permanent racing facility
- Course length: 1.015 miles (1.6 km)
- Distance: 175 laps, 175 mi (281 km)
- Scheduled distance: 175 laps, 175 mi (281 km)
- Average speed: 85.683 mph (137.893 km/h)

Pole position
Driver	Grant Enfinger	GMS Racing
- Time: 29.744

Most laps led
Driver	Grant Enfinger	GMS Racing
- Laps: 95

Winner
No. 23	Grant Enfinger	GMS Racing

Television in the United States
- Network: FS1
- Announcers: Adam Alexander, Phil Parsons, and Michael Waltrip

Radio in the United States
- Radio: MRN

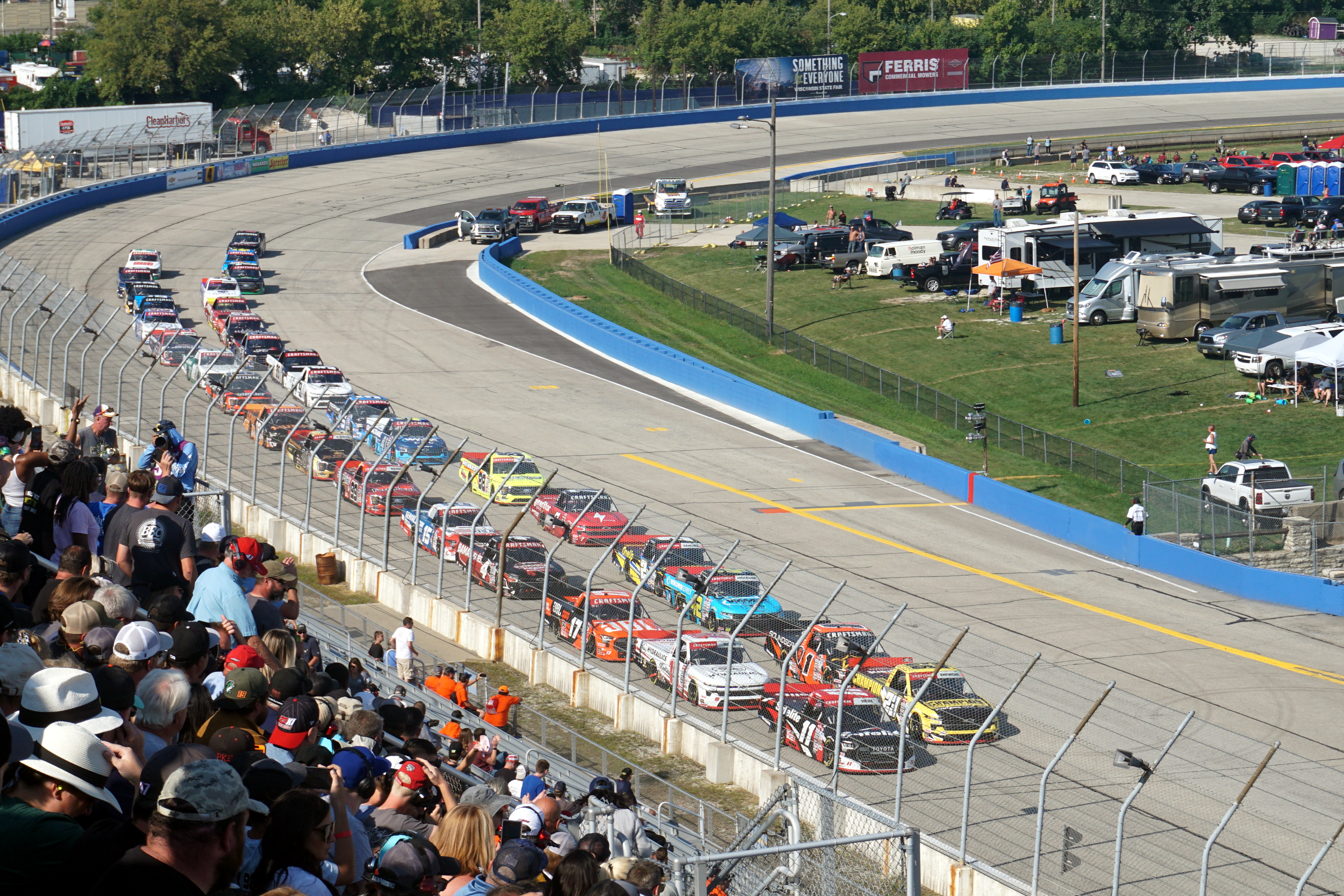
A restart during the 2023 Clean Harbors 175

The 2023 Clean Harbors 175 was the 18th stock car race of the 2023 NASCAR Craftsman Truck Series, the second race of the Round of 10, and the first iteration of the event. The race was held on Sunday, August 27, 2023, in West Allis, Wisconsin at the Milwaukee Mile, a 1 mile (1.6 km) permanent oval shaped racetrack. The race took the scheduled 175 laps to complete. Grant Enfinger, driving for GMS Racing, would hold off Carson Hocevar with under 10 laps to go, and earned his 10th career NASCAR Craftsman Truck Series win, and his second of the season. Enfinger would dominate the majority of the race, winning both stages and leading a race-high 95 laps. He would also earn a spot in the next spot of the playoffs. To fill out the podium, Hocevar, driving for Niece Motorsports, and Christian Eckes, driving for McAnally-Hilgemann Racing, would finish 2nd and 3rd, respectively. This was the first Truck Series to be held at Milwaukee Mile since 2009.

== Background ==
The Milwaukee Mile is a 1.015 mi (1.633 km) oval race track in the central United States, located on the grounds of the Wisconsin State Fair Park in West Allis, Wisconsin, a suburb west of Milwaukee. Its grandstand and bleachers seats approximately 37,000 spectators. Paved 72 years ago in 1954, it was originally a dirt track. In addition to the oval, there is a 1.800 mi (2.897 km) road circuit located on the infield.

As the oldest operating motor speedway in the world, the Milwaukee Mile has hosted at least one auto race every year from 1903 to 2015 (except during U.S. involvement in World War II). The track has held events sanctioned by major bodies, such as the AAA, USAC, NASCAR, CART/Champ Car World Series, and the IndyCar Series. There have also been many races in regional series such as ARTGO.

=== Entry list ===
- (R) denotes rookie driver.
- (i) denotes driver who is ineligible for series driver points.
- (P) denotes playoff driver.
- (OP) denotes owner's playoff truck.

#	Driver	Team	Make
1	William Sawalich	Tricon Garage	Toyota
02	Josh Bilicki (i)	Young's Motorsports	Chevrolet
2	Nick Sanchez (R) (P)	Rev Racing	Chevrolet
4	Chase Purdy	Kyle Busch Motorsports	Chevrolet
5	Dean Thompson	Tricon Garage	Toyota
7	Derek Kraus (i)	Spire Motorsports	Chevrolet
9	Colby Howard	CR7 Motorsports	Chevrolet
11	Corey Heim (P)	Tricon Garage	Toyota
12	Spencer Boyd	Young's Motorsports	Chevrolet
13	Hailie Deegan	ThorSport Racing	Ford
15	Tanner Gray	Tricon Garage	Toyota
16	Tyler Ankrum	Hattori Racing Enterprises	Toyota
17	Taylor Gray (R)	Tricon Garage	Toyota
19	Christian Eckes (P)	McAnally-Hilgemann Racing	Chevrolet
20	Greg Van Alst	Young's Motorsports	Chevrolet
21	Dexter Bean (i)	BlackJack Racing	Chevrolet
22	Josh Reaume	AM Racing	Ford
23	Grant Enfinger (P)	GMS Racing	Chevrolet
24	Rajah Caruth (R)	GMS Racing	Chevrolet
25	Matt DiBenedetto (P)	Rackley WAR	Chevrolet
30	Brad Perez (i)	On Point Motorsports	Toyota
32	Bret Holmes (R)	Bret Holmes Racing	Chevrolet
33	Derek Lemke	Reaume Brothers Racing	Ford
35	Jake Garcia (R)	McAnally-Hilgemann Racing	Chevrolet
38	Zane Smith (P)	Front Row Motorsports	Ford
41	Bayley Currey	Niece Motorsports	Chevrolet
42	Carson Hocevar (P)	Niece Motorsports	Chevrolet
43	Daniel Dye (R)	GMS Racing	Chevrolet
45	Lawless Alan	Niece Motorsports	Chevrolet
51	Matt Mills (OP)	Kyle Busch Motorsports	Chevrolet
52	Stewart Friesen	Halmar Friesen Racing	Toyota
56	Tyler Hill	Hill Motorsports	Toyota
61	Sean Hingorani	Hattori Racing Enterprises	Toyota
66	Conner Jones	ThorSport Racing	Ford
88	Matt Crafton (P)	ThorSport Racing	Ford
98	Ty Majeski (P)	ThorSport Racing	Ford
99	Ben Rhodes (P)	ThorSport Racing	Ford
Official entry list

== Practice ==
The first and only practice session was held on Saturday, August 26, at 1:00 PM CST, and would last for 50 minutes. Ty Majeski, driving for ThorSport Racing, would set the fastest time in the session, with a lap of 30.351, and an average speed of 120.391 mph (193.751 km/h).

Pos.	#	Driver	Team	Make	Time	Speed
1	98	Ty Majeski (P)	ThorSport Racing	Ford	30.351	120.391
2	2	Nick Sanchez (R) (P)	Rev Racing	Chevrolet	30.382	120.269
3	42	Carson Hocevar (P)	Niece Motorsports	Chevrolet	30.392	120.229
Full practice results

== Qualifying ==
Qualifying was held on Sunday, August 27, at 10:30 AM CST. Since Milwaukee Mile is a mile oval, the qualifying system used is a single-car, one-lap system with only one round. In that round, whoever sets the fastest time will win the pole. Grant Enfinger, driving for GMS Racing, would score the pole for the race, with a lap of 29.744, and an average speed of 122.848 mph (197.705 km/h).

Pos.	#	Driver	Team	Make	Time	Speed
1	23	Grant Enfinger (P)	GMS Racing	Chevrolet	29.744	122.848
2	2	Nick Sanchez (R) (P)	Rev Racing	Chevrolet	29.804	122.601
3	42	Carson Hocevar (P)	Niece Motorsports	Chevrolet	29.831	122.490
4	17	Taylor Gray (R)	Tricon Garage	Toyota	29.877	122.301
5	43	Daniel Dye (R)	GMS Racing	Chevrolet	29.901	122.203
6	19	Christian Eckes (P)	McAnally-Hilgemann Racing	Chevrolet	29.908	122.175
7	4	Chase Purdy	Kyle Busch Motorsports	Chevrolet	29.952	121.995
8	11	Corey Heim (P)	Tricon Garage	Toyota	30.045	121.618
9	35	Jake Garcia (R)	McAnally-Hilgemann Racing	Chevrolet	30.058	121.565
10	99	Ben Rhodes (P)	ThorSport Racing	Ford	30.069	121.521
11	15	Tanner Gray	Tricon Garage	Toyota	30.130	121.274
12	1	William Sawalich	Tricon Garage	Toyota	30.130	121.274
13	98	Ty Majeski (P)	ThorSport Racing	Ford	30.193	121.021
14	41	Bayley Currey	Niece Motorsports	Chevrolet	30.193	121.021
15	24	Rajah Caruth (R)	GMS Racing	Chevrolet	30.232	120.865
16	16	Tyler Ankrum	Hattori Racing Enterprises	Toyota	30.248	120.801
17	13	Hailie Deegan	ThorSport Racing	Ford	30.284	120.658
18	38	Zane Smith (P)	Front Row Motorsports	Ford	30.295	120.614
19	5	Dean Thompson	Tricon Garage	Toyota	30.298	120.602
20	45	Lawless Alan	Niece Motorsports	Chevrolet	30.328	120.483
21	52	Stewart Friesen	Halmar Friesen Racing	Toyota	30.347	120.407
22	88	Matt Crafton (P)	ThorSport Racing	Ford	30.387	120.249
23	25	Matt DiBenedetto (P)	Rackley WAR	Chevrolet	30.400	120.197
24	9	Colby Howard	CR7 Motorsports	Chevrolet	30.453	119.988
25	7	Derek Kraus (i)	Spire Motorsports	Chevrolet	30.465	119.941
26	51	Matt Mills (OP)	Kyle Busch Motorsports	Chevrolet	30.503	119.791
27	61	Sean Hingorani	Hattori Racing Enterprises	Toyota	30.540	119.646
28	66	Conner Jones	ThorSport Racing	Ford	30.577	119.502
29	32	Bret Holmes (R)	Bret Holmes Racing	Chevrolet	30.665	119.159
30	12	Spencer Boyd	Young's Motorsports	Chevrolet	30.700	119.023
31	02	Josh Bilicki (i)	Young's Motorsports	Chevrolet	30.901	118.249
Qualified by owner's points
32	56	Tyler Hill	Hill Motorsports	Toyota	30.961	118.019
33	33	Derek Lemke	Reaume Brothers Racing	Ford	31.047	117.693
34	30	Brad Perez (i)	On Point Motorsports	Toyota	31.223	117.029
35	22	Josh Reaume	AM Racing	Ford	31.318	116.674
36	20	Greg Van Alst	Young's Motorsports	Chevrolet	31.434	116.244
Failed to qualify
37	21	Dexter Bean (i)	BlackJack Racing	Chevrolet	30.977	117.958
Official qualifying results
Official starting lineup

== Race results ==
Stage 1 Laps: 55

Pos.	#	Driver	Team	Make	Pts
1	23	Grant Enfinger (P)	GMS Racing	Chevrolet	10
2	2	Nick Sanchez (R) (P)	Rev Racing	Chevrolet	9
3	17	Taylor Gray (R)	Tricon Garage	Toyota	8
4	11	Corey Heim (P)	Tricon Garage	Toyota	7
5	19	Christian Eckes (P)	McAnally-Hilgemann Racing	Chevrolet	6
6	42	Carson Hocevar (P)	Niece Motorsports	Chevrolet	5
7	1	William Sawalich	Tricon Garage	Toyota	4
8	7	Derek Kraus (i)	Spire Motorsports	Chevrolet	0
9	4	Chase Purdy	Kyle Busch Motorsports	Chevrolet	2
10	99	Ben Rhodes (P)	ThorSport Racing	Ford	1

Stage 2 Laps: 55

Pos.	#	Driver	Team	Make	Pts
1	23	Grant Enfinger (P)	GMS Racing	Chevrolet	10
2	11	Corey Heim (P)	Tricon Garage	Toyota	9
3	19	Christian Eckes (P)	McAnally-Hilgemann Racing	Chevrolet	8
4	42	Carson Hocevar (P)	Niece Motorsports	Chevrolet	7
5	1	William Sawalich	Tricon Garage	Toyota	6
6	2	Nick Sanchez (R) (P)	Rev Racing	Chevrolet	5
7	98	Ty Majeski (P)	ThorSport Racing	Ford	4
8	88	Matt Crafton (P)	ThorSport Racing	Ford	3
9	15	Tanner Gray	Tricon Garage	Toyota	2
10	38	Zane Smith (P)	Front Row Motorsports	Chevrolet	1

Stage 3 Laps: 75

Fin	St	#	Driver	Team	Make	Laps	Led	Status	Pts
1	1	23	Grant Enfinger (P)	GMS Racing	Chevrolet	175	95	Running	60
2	3	42	Carson Hocevar (P)	Niece Motorsports	Chevrolet	175	40	Running	47
3	6	19	Christian Eckes (P)	McAnally-Hilgemann Racing	Chevrolet	175	5	Running	48
4	8	11	Corey Heim (P)	Tricon Garage	Toyota	175	35	Running	49
5	22	88	Matt Crafton (P)	ThorSport Racing	Ford	175	0	Running	35
6	7	4	Chase Purdy	Kyle Busch Motorsports	Chevrolet	175	0	Running	33
7	13	98	Ty Majeski (P)	ThorSport Racing	Ford	175	0	Running	34
8	25	7	Derek Kraus (i)	Spire Motorsports	Chevrolet	175	0	Running	0
9	9	35	Jake Garcia (R)	McAnally-Hilgemann Racing	Chevrolet	175	0	Running	28
10	14	41	Bayley Currey	Niece Motorsports	Chevrolet	175	0	Running	27
11	11	15	Tanner Gray	Tricon Garage	Toyota	175	0	Running	28
12	18	38	Zane Smith (P)	Front Row Motorsports	Ford	175	0	Running	26
13	4	17	Taylor Gray (R)	Tricon Garage	Toyota	175	0	Running	32
14	15	24	Rajah Caruth (R)	GMS Racing	Chevrolet	175	0	Running	23
15	19	5	Dean Thompson	Tricon Garage	Toyota	175	0	Running	22
16	10	99	Ben Rhodes (P)	ThorSport Racing	Ford	175	0	Running	22
17	24	9	Colby Howard	CR7 Motorsports	Chevrolet	175	0	Running	20
18	28	66	Conner Jones	ThorSport Racing	Ford	175	0	Running	19
19	29	32	Bret Holmes (R)	Bret Holmes Racing	Chevrolet	175	0	Running	18
20	16	16	Tyler Ankrum	Hattori Racing Enterprises	Toyota	175	0	Running	17
21	20	45	Lawless Alan	Niece Motorsports	Chevrolet	175	0	Running	16
22	17	13	Hailie Deegan	ThorSport Racing	Ford	175	0	Running	15
23	27	61	Sean Hingorani	Hattori Racing Enterprises	Toyota	175	0	Running	14
24	2	2	Nick Sanchez (R) (P)	Rev Racing	Chevrolet	175	0	Running	27
25	26	51	Matt Mills (OP)	Kyle Busch Motorsports	Chevrolet	175	0	Running	12
26	12	1	William Sawalich	Tricon Garage	Toyota	175	0	Running	21
27	23	25	Matt DiBenedetto (P)	Rackley WAR	Chevrolet	173	0	Running	10
28	5	43	Daniel Dye (R)	GMS Racing	Chevrolet	173	0	Running	9
29	32	56	Tyler Hill	Hill Motorsports	Toyota	173	0	Running	8
30	21	52	Stewart Friesen	Halmar Friesen Racing	Toyota	172	0	Running	7
31	33	33	Derek Lemke	Reaume Brothers Racing	Ford	172	0	Running	6
32	30	12	Spencer Boyd	Young's Motorsports	Chevrolet	172	0	Running	5
33	35	22	Josh Reaume	AM Racing	Ford	171	0	Running	4
34	36	20	Greg Van Alst	Young's Motorsports	Chevrolet	63	0	Accident	3
35	34	30	Brad Perez (i)	On Point Motorsports	Toyota	62	0	Accident	0
36	31	02	Josh Bilicki (i)	Young's Motorsports	Chevrolet	9	0	Accident	0
Official race results

== Standings after the race ==
Drivers' Championship standings

	Pos	Driver	Points
	1	Corey Heim	2,126
1	2	Christian Eckes	2,117 (-9)
3	3	Grant Enfinger	2,114 (-12)
	4	Carson Hocevar	2,112 (-14)
3	5	Ty Majeski	2,108 (-18)
1	6	Zane Smith	2,085 (-41)
2	7	Matt Crafton	2,065 (-61)
	8	Nick Sanchez	2,059 (-67)
2	9	Ben Rhodes	2,056 (-70)
	10	Matt DiBenedetto	2,039 (-87)
Official driver's standings

- Note: Only the first 10 positions are included for the driver standings.

Previous race: 2023 TSport 200	NASCAR Craftsman Truck Series; 2023 season	Next race: 2023 Kansas Lottery 200
