= 2020 Sport Clips Haircuts VFW 200 =

Race details
- Race 23 of 33 in the 2020 NASCAR Xfinity Series season
- Date: September 5, 2020
- Location: Darlington Raceway in Darlington, South Carolina
- Course: Permanent racing facility
- Course length: 1.366 miles (2.198 km)
- Distance: 147 laps, 200.802 mi (323.159 km)
- Average speed: 101.643 mph

Pole position
Driver	Justin Haley	Kaulig Racing
- Grid positions set by competition-based formula

Most laps led
Driver	Chase Briscoe	Stewart-Haas Racing
- Laps: 55

Winner
No. 19	Brandon Jones	Joe Gibbs Racing

The 2020 Sport Clips Haircuts VFW 200 was a NASCAR Xfinity Series race held on September 5, 2020. It was contested over 147 laps on the 1.366-mile (2.198 km) egg-shaped oval racetrack. It was the twenty-third race of the 2020 NASCAR Xfinity Series season. Joe Gibbs Racing driver Brandon Jones collected his third win of the season.

== Report ==
=== Background ===
Darlington Raceway is a race track built for NASCAR racing located near Darlington, South Carolina. It is nicknamed "The Lady in Black" and "The Track Too Tough to Tame" by many NASCAR fans and drivers and advertised as "A NASCAR Tradition." It is of a unique, somewhat egg-shaped design, an oval with the ends of very different configurations, a condition which supposedly arose from the proximity of one end of the track to a minnow pond the owner refused to relocate. This situation makes it very challenging for the crews to set up their cars' handling in a way that is effective at both ends.

=== Entry list ===
- (R) denotes rookie driver.
- (i) denotes driver who is ineligible for series driver points.

No.	Driver	Team	Manufacturer
0	Jeffrey Earnhardt	JD Motorsports	Chevrolet
1	Michael Annett	JR Motorsports	Chevrolet
02	Brett Moffitt (i)	Our Motorsports	Chevrolet
4	Jesse Little (R)	JD Motorsports	Chevrolet
5	Vinnie Miller	B. J. McLeod Motorsports	Chevrolet
6	Ryan Vargas	JD Motorsports	Chevrolet
7	Justin Allgaier	JR Motorsports	Chevrolet
07	David Starr	SS-Green Light Racing	Chevrolet
8	Daniel Hemric	JR Motorsports	Chevrolet
08	Joe Graf Jr. (R)	SS-Green Light Racing	Chevrolet
9	Noah Gragson	JR Motorsports	Chevrolet
10	Ross Chastain	Kaulig Racing	Chevrolet
11	Justin Haley	Kaulig Racing	Chevrolet
13	Chad Finchum	MBM Motorsports	Toyota
15	Colby Howard	JD Motorsports	Chevrolet
18	Riley Herbst (R)	Joe Gibbs Racing	Toyota
19	Brandon Jones	Joe Gibbs Racing	Toyota
20	Harrison Burton (R)	Joe Gibbs Racing	Toyota
21	Anthony Alfredo	Richard Childress Racing	Chevrolet
22	Austin Cindric	Team Penske	Ford
36	Alex Labbé	DGM Racing	Chevrolet
39	Ryan Sieg	RSS Racing	Chevrolet
44	Tommy Joe Martins	Martins Motorsports	Chevrolet
47	Kyle Weatherman	Mike Harmon Racing	Chevrolet
51	Jeremy Clements	Jeremy Clements Racing	Chevrolet
52	Kody Vanderwal (R)	Means Racing	Chevrolet
54	Denny Hamlin (i)	Joe Gibbs Racing	Toyota
61	Austin Hill (i)	Hattori Racing	Toyota
66	Stephen Leicht	MBM Motorsports	Toyota
68	Brandon Brown	Brandonbilt Motorsports	Chevrolet
74	Bayley Currey (i)	Mike Harmon Racing	Chevrolet
78	B. J. McLeod	B. J. McLeod Motorsports	Chevrolet
90	Dexter Bean	DGM Racing	Chevrolet
92	Josh Williams	DGM Racing	Chevrolet
93	Myatt Snider (R)	RSS Racing	Chevrolet
98	Chase Briscoe	Stewart-Haas Racing	Ford
99	Matt Mills	B. J. McLeod Motorsports	Chevrolet
Official entry list

== Qualifying ==
Justin Haley was awarded the pole for the race as determined by competition-based formula.

=== Qualifying results ===
Pos	No	Driver	Team	Manufacturer
1	11	Justin Haley	Kaulig Racing	Chevrolet
2	98	Chase Briscoe	Stewart-Haas Racing	Ford
3	20	Harrison Burton (R)	Joe Gibbs Racing	Toyota
4	22	Austin Cindric	Team Penske	Ford
5	10	Ross Chastain	Kaulig Racing	Chevrolet
6	18	Riley Herbst (R)	Joe Gibbs Racing	Toyota
7	1	Michael Annett	JR Motorsports	Chevrolet
8	19	Brandon Jones	Joe Gibbs Racing	Toyota
9	92	Josh Williams	DGM Racing	Chevrolet
10	4	Jesse Little (R)	JD Motorsports	Chevrolet
11	39	Ryan Sieg	RSS Racing	Chevrolet
12	21	Anthony Alfredo	Richard Childress Racing	Chevrolet
13	51	Jeremy Clements	Jeremy Clements Racing	Chevrolet
14	9	Noah Gragson	JR Motorsports	Chevrolet
15	8	Daniel Hemric	Joe Gibbs Racing	Toyota
16	7	Justin Allgaier	JR Motorsports	Chevrolet
17	68	Brandon Brown	Brandonbilt Motorsports	Chevrolet
18	15	Colby Howard	JD Motorsports	Chevrolet
19	44	Tommy Joe Martins	Martins Motorsports	Chevrolet
20	93	Myatt Snider (R)	RSS Racing	Chevrolet
21	02	Brett Moffitt	Our Motorsports	Chevrolet
22	07	David Starr	SS-Green Light Racing	Chevrolet
23	13	Chad Finchum	MBM Motorsports	Toyota
24	36	Alex Labbé	DGM Racing	Chevrolet
25	0	Jeffrey Earnhardt	JD Motorsports	Chevrolet
26	61	Austin Hill (i)	Hattori Racing Enterprises	Toyota
27	78	B. J. McLeod	B. J. McLeod Motorsports	Chevrolet
28	08	Joe Graf Jr. (R)	SS-Green Light Racing	Chevrolet
29	6	Ryan Vargas	JD Motorsports	Chevrolet
30	74	Bayley Currey (i)	Mike Harmon Racing	Chevrolet
31	47	Kyle Weatherman	Mike Harmon Racing	Chevrolet
32	5	Vinnie Miller	B. J. McLeod Motorsports	Chevrolet
33	99	Matt Mills	B. J. McLeod Motorsports	Chevrolet
34	52	Kody Vanderwal (R)	Means Motorsports	Chevrolet
35	90	Dexter Bean	DGM Racing	Chevrolet
36	66	Stephen Leicht	MBM Motorsports	Toyota
37	54	Denny Hamlin (i)	Joe Gibbs Racing	Toyota
Official qualifying results

== Race ==
=== Race results ===
==== Stage Results ====
Stage One Laps: 45

Pos	No	Driver	Team	Manufacturer	Points
1	54	Denny Hamlin (i)	Joe Gibbs Racing	Toyota	0
2	10	Ross Chastain	Kaulig Racing	Chevrolet	9
3	22	Austin Cindric	Team Penske	Ford	8
4	98	Chase Briscoe	Stewart-Haas Racing	Ford	7
5	9	Noah Gragson	JR Motorsports	Chevrolet	6
6	19	Brandon Jones	Joe Gibbs Racing	Toyota	5
7	44	Tommy Joe Martins	Martins Motorsports	Chevrolet	4
8	1	Michael Annett	JR Motorsports	Chevrolet	3
9	39	Ryan Sieg	RSS Racing	Chevrolet	2
10	7	Justin Allgaier	JR Motorsports	Chevrolet	1

Stage Two Laps: 45

Pos	No	Driver	Team	Manufacturer	Points
1	54	Denny Hamlin (i)	Joe Gibbs Racing	Toyota	0
2	19	Brandon Jones	Joe Gibbs Racing	Toyota	9
3	98	Chase Briscoe	Stewart-Haas Racing	Ford	8
4	10	Ross Chastain	Kaulig Racing	Chevrolet	7
5	20	Harrison Burton (R)	Joe Gibbs Racing	Toyota	6
6	39	Ryan Sieg	RSS Racing	Chevrolet	5
7	22	Austin Cindric	Team Penske	Ford	4
8	1	Michael Annett	JR Motorsports	Chevrolet	3
9	51	Jeremy Clements	Jeremy Clements Racing	Chevrolet	2
10	18	Riley Herbst	Stewart-Haas Racing	Ford	1

=== Final Stage Results ===
Laps: 57

Pos	Grid	No	Driver	Team	Manufacturer	Laps	Points	Status
1	8	19	Brandon Jones	Joe Gibbs Racing	Toyota	147	54	Running
2	5	10	Ross Chastain	Kaulig Racing	Chevrolet	147	51	Running
3	11	39	Ryan Sieg	RSS Racing	Chevrolet	147	41	Running
4	6	18	Riley Herbst (R)	Joe Gibbs Racing	Toyota	147	34	Running
5	37	54	Denny Hamlin (i)	Joe Gibbs Racing	Toyota	147	0	Running
6	3	20	Harrison Burton	Joe Gibbs Racing	Toyota	147	37	Running
7	14	9	Noah Gragson	JR Motorsports	Chevrolet	147	36	Running
8	7	1	Michael Annett	JR Motorsports	Chevrolet	147	35	Running
9	26	61	Austin Hill (i)	Hattori Racing Enterprises	Toyota	147	0	Running
10	20	93	Myatt Snider (R)	RSS Racing	Chevrolet	147	27	Running
11	2	98	Chase Briscoe	Stewart-Haas Racing	Ford	147	41	Running
12	4	22	Austin Cindric	Team Penske	Ford	147	37	Running
13	1	11	Justin Haley	Kaulig Racing	Chevrolet	147	24	Running
14	27	78	B. J. McLeod	B. J. McLeod Motorsports	Chevrolet	147	23	Running
15	9	92	Josh Williams	DGM Racing	Chevrolet	147	22	Running
16	24	36	Alex Labbé	DGM Racing	Chevrolet	147	21	Running
17	17	68	Brandon Brown	Brandonbilt Motorsports	Chevrolet	147	20	Running
18	10	4	Jesse Little (R)	JD Motorsports	Chevrolet	147	19	Running
19	18	15	Colby Howard	JD Motorsports	Chevrolet	147	18	Running
20	23	13	Chad Finchum	MBM Motorsports	Toyota	146	17	Running
21	25	0	Jeffrey Earnhardt	JD Motorsports	Chevrolet	146	16	Running
22	33	99	Matt Mills	B. J. McLeod Motorsports	Chevrolet	146	15	Running
23	28	08	Joe Graf Jr.	SS-Green Light Racing	Chevrolet	146	14	Running
24	30	74	Bayley Currey (i)	Mike Harmon Racing	Chevrolet	146	0	Running
25	29	6	Ryan Vargas	JD Motorsports	Chevrolet	146	12	Running
26	19	44	Tommy Joe Martins	Martins Motorsports	Chevrolet	145	15	Running
27	12	21	Anthony Alfredo	Richard Childress Racing	Chevrolet	145	10	Running
28	32	5	Vinnie Miller	B. J. McLeod Motorsports	Chevrolet	145	9	Running
29	34	52	Kody Vanderwal (R)	Means Motorsports	Chevrolet	145	8	Running
30	35	90	Dexter Bean	DGM Racing	Chevrolet	145	7	Running
31	16	7	Justin Allgaier	JR Motorsports	Chevrolet	135	7	Running
32	13	51	Jeremy Clements	Jeremy Clements Racing	Chevrolet	129	7	Running
33	21	02	Brett Moffitt (i)	Our Motorsports	Chevrolet	118	0	Oil Leak
34	22	07	David Starr	SS-Green Light Racing	Chevrolet	108	3	Accident
35	36	66	Stephen Leicht	MBM Motorsports	Toyota	11	2	Suspension
36	31	47	Kyle Weatherman	Mike Harmon Racing	Chevrolet	5	1	Accident
37	15	8	Daniel Hemric	JR Motorsports	Chevrolet	2	1	Accident
Official race results

=== Race statistics ===
- Lead changes: 17 among 6 different drivers
- Cautions/Laps: 7 for 37
- Time of race: 1 hour, 58 minutes, and 32 seconds
- Average speed: 101.643 mph (163.579 km/h)

Previous race: 2020 Wawa 250	NASCAR Xfinity Series; 2020 season	Next race: 2020 Go Bowling 250
