= Joe Graf Jr. =

American racing driver (born 1998)

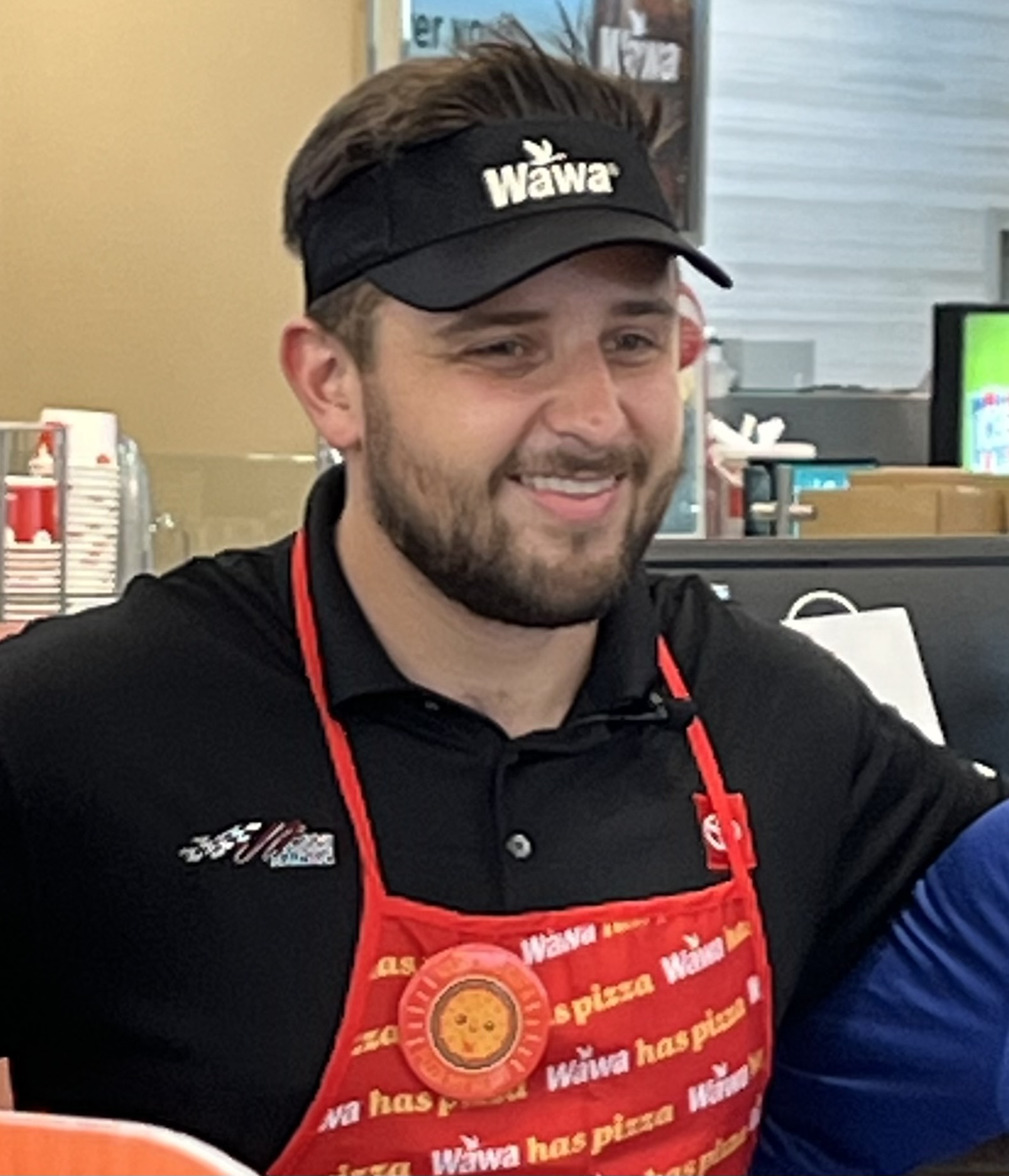
- Graf at a Wawa in 2023
- Born: Joseph A. Graf Jr. July 12, 1998 (age 28); Mahwah, New Jersey, U.S.

NASCAR O'Reilly Auto Parts Series career
- 130 races run over 6 years
- 2024 position: 38th
- Best finish: 22nd (2020)
- First race: 2019 CircuitCity.com 250 (Iowa)
- Last race: 2024 Food City 300 (Bristol)
Wins	Top tens	Poles
0	5	0

ARCA Menards Series career
- 39 races run over 2 years
- Best finish: 5th (2019)
- First race: 2018 Music City 200 (Nashville)
- Last race: 2019 Kansas ARCA 150 (Kansas)
- First win: 2018 Primera Plastics 200 (Berlin)
Wins	Top tens	Poles
1	21	0

ARCA Menards Series East career
- 3 races run over 3 years
- Best finish: 44th (2019)
- First race: 2018 New Smyrna 175 (New Smyrna)
- Last race: 2020 General Tire 125 (Dover)
Wins	Top tens	Poles
0	0	0
- Statistics up to date as of October 23, 2024.

Joseph A. Graf Jr. (born July 12, 1998) is an American professional stock car racing driver. He last competed part-time in the NASCAR Xfinity Series, driving the No. 19 Toyota Supra for Joe Gibbs Racing.

== Racing career ==
At the beginning of his career, Graf drove Bandolero cars at Elko Speedway. He later raced Modifieds at Stafford Speedway.

=== ARCA Menards Series ===
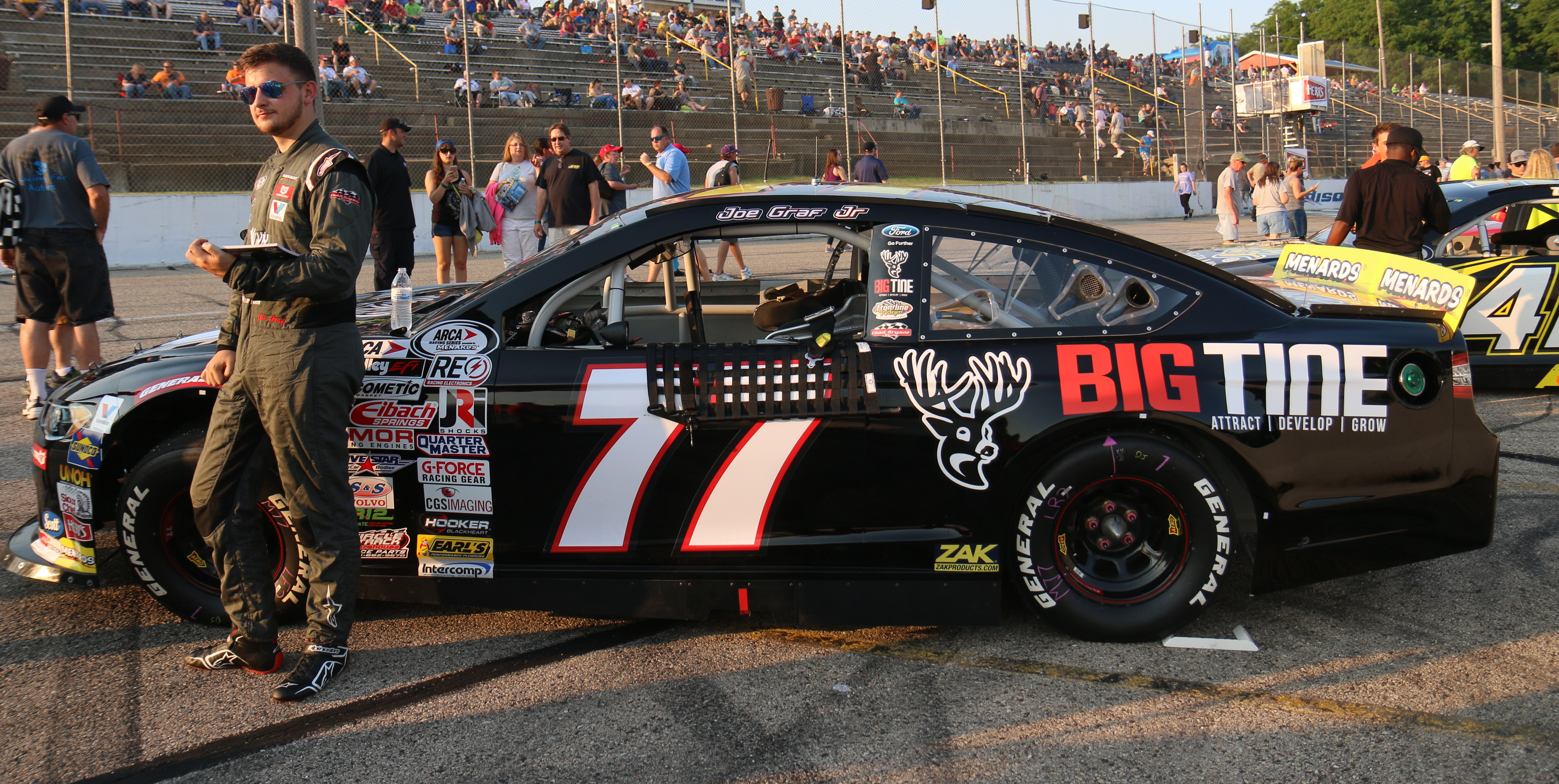
2018 ARCA car

Graf ran the whole season in 2018 save for the season-opening race at Daytona. The deal originally started out as a six-race schedule, but eventually expanded to 19 races. In his third race at Talladega, Graf raced on a foot he had recently broken and finished second to Zane Smith in the closest finish in series history. At Berlin Raceway in August, Graf spun Chandler Smith on the would-be final lap and then, after losing the lead to Zane Smith on the ensuing restart, pushed Smith up the track in turn four on the final lap to claim his first checkered flag in ARCA competition.

In 2023, Graf would test a car for Emerling-Gase Motorsports at Daytona.

=== Xfinity Series ===
In April 2019, Graf joined Richard Childress Racing's driver development program, which enabled him to run five NASCAR Xfinity Series races for the team starting with Michigan International Speedway's LTi Printing 250. He also became a marketing and communications intern for the team. After failing to qualify at Michigan, he made his series debut in Iowa Speedway's CircuitCity.com 250, where he finished 19th. Graf later said that he hopes to use the schedule as a lead-up to a full-time Xfinity schedule in 2020. At Richmond Raceway in September, Graf blew the tire of John Hunter Nemechek when Graf moved Nemechek, a driver competing in the NASCAR playoffs, on the last lap. In retaliation, Nemechek spun Graf's car, in turn, one after the checkered flag.

On January 16, 2020, SS-Green Light Racing announced Graf would race for the team full-time in the Xfinity Series that year, replacing Gray Gaulding in the team's No. 08 car. He finished 22nd in points with a best finish of 13th on three occasions.

Graf moved to the team's No. 07 in 2021. Prior to the start of the season, Graf hired Buffalo Bills player Antonio Williams as an advisor; the two had befriended each other through a mutual acquaintance. At the conclusion of the Martinsville race, a fight broke out on pit road between Graf and Gray Gaulding after Gaulding wrecked Graf on lap 177. He missed the Pit Boss 250 at Circuit of the Americas due to a strained left knee and was replaced by Ross Chastain; Graf had run the weekend's practice but ranked 40th due to the injury affecting his braking ability.

In 2022, Graf would return to SS-Green Light Racing in the No. 07 and the No. 08. After failing to qualify the No. 08 in the Production Alliance Group 300, he replaced Timmy Hill in RSS Racing's No. 38 and finished 15th.

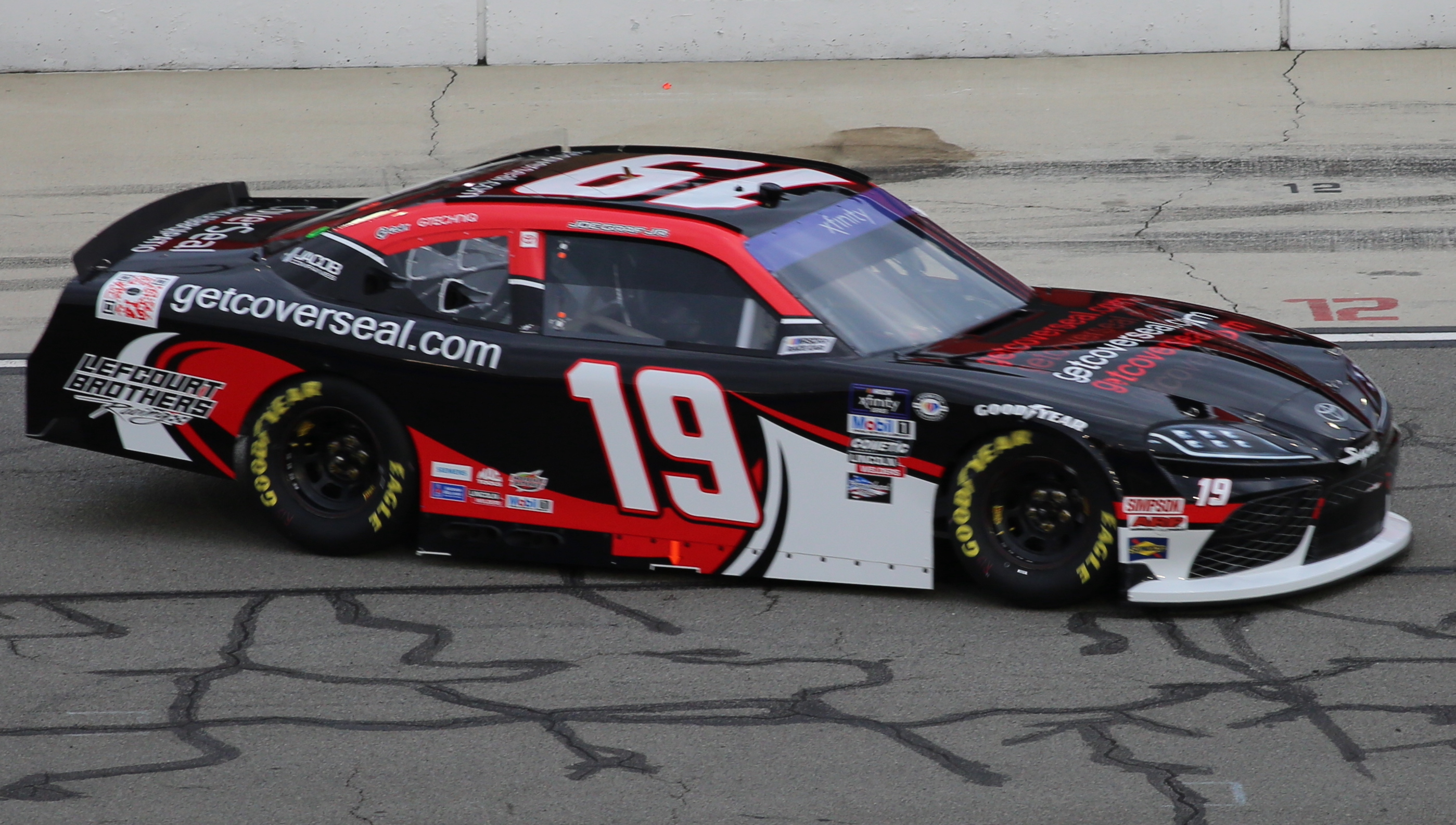
Graf Jr. at Auto Club Speedway in 2023

In 2023, Graf ran a full-time schedule with two different teams: 27 races in the Nos. 28, 38 and No. 39 Ford Mustangs for RSS Racing and six races in the No. 19 Toyota Supra for Joe Gibbs Racing. Graf would finish seventh in the season opener at Daytona in the No. 39. Graf would follow this up with an 11th place finish at Auto Club Speedway and 15th at Las Vegas Motor Speedway in the No. 19. Graf, while driving in the JGR No. 19 later in the season, finished ninth at Kansas and tenth at Homestead-Miami, respectively.

== Personal life ==
Raised in Mahwah, New Jersey, Graf attended Don Bosco Preparatory High School and played high school sports for two years before choosing to focus on his driving.

Graf attends New York University.

He is not related to Klaus Graf who is also a racing driver.

== Motorsports career results ==
=== NASCAR ===
(key) (Bold – Pole position awarded by qualifying time. Italics – Pole position earned by points standings or practice time. * – Most laps led.)

==== Xfinity Series ====
NASCAR Xfinity Series results
Year	Team	No.	Make	1	2	3	4	5	6	7	8	9	10	11	12	13	14	15	16	17	18	19	20	21	22	23	24	25	26	27	28	29	30	31	32	33	NXSC	Pts	Ref
2019	Richard Childress Racing	21	Chevy	DAY	ATL	LVS	PHO	CAL	TEX	BRI	RCH	TAL	DOV	CLT	POC	MCH; DNQ	IOW; 19	CHI	DAY; 23	KEN	NHA	IOW	GLN	MOH						RCH; 14	ROV	DOV	KAN	TEX	PHO	HOM	44th	55	
2019	Kaulig Racing	10	Chevy																						BRI; DNQ	ROA	DAR	IND	LVS								44th	55	
2020	SS-Green Light Racing	08	Chevy	DAY; 36	LVS; 20	CAL; 31	PHO; 31	DAR; 19	CLT; 19	BRI; 13	ATL; 26	HOM; 16	HOM; 13	TAL; 34	POC; 35	IRC; 26	KEN; 13	KEN; 22	TEX; 21	KAN; 28	ROA; 25	DRC; 26	DOV; 18	DOV; 21	DAY; 37	DAR; 23	RCH; 19	RCH; 27	BRI; 27	LVS; 27	TAL; 31	ROV; 15	KAN; 32	TEX; 22	MAR; 21	PHO; 27	22nd	422	
2021	SS-Green Light Racing	07	Chevy	DAY; 11	DRC; 20	HOM; 27	LVS; 18	PHO; 25	ATL; 29	MAR; 38	TAL; 33	DAR; 37	DOV; 29	COA	CLT; DNQ	MOH; 30	TEX; 31		POC; 32	ROA	ATL; 25	NHA; 24	GLN; 30	IRC	MCH; 38	DAY; 35	DAR; 19	RCH; 31	BRI; 17	LVS; 40	TAL; 10		TEX; 26	KAN; 28	MAR; 15		28th	286	
2021	SS-Green Light Racing with Rick Ware Racing	17	Chevy															NSH; 34														ROV; 28				PHO; 35	28th	286	
2022	SS-Green Light Racing	07	Ford	DAY; 29		LVS; 38	PHO; 27	ATL; 23		RCH; 29	MAR; 26	TAL; 8	DOV; 28	DAR; 36	TEX; 23	CLT; 34	PIR; 21	NSH; 37		ATL; 30	NHA; 12	POC	IRC	MCH; 23	GLN	DAY; 37	DAR; 33	KAN	BRI; 23	TEX; 18	TAL; 22	ROV; 27	LVS	HOM; 24	MAR; 27	PHO; 36	27th	284	
2022	SS-Green Light Racing	08	Ford		CAL; DNQ				COA; 34																												27th	284	
2022	RSS Racing	38	Ford		CAL; 15																																27th	284	
2022	B. J. McLeod Motorsports	5	Ford																ROA; 36																		27th	284	
2023	RSS Racing	39	Ford	DAY; 7																																	23rd	395	
2023	Joe Gibbs Racing	19	Toyota		CAL; 11	LVS; 15				RCH; 37											NHA; 29								KAN; 9					HOM; 10			23rd	395	
2023	RSS Racing	38	Ford				PHO; 31	ATL; 25	COA; 31		MAR; 37	TAL; 20	DOV; 22	DAR; 32	CLT; 17	PIR; 23	SON; 31	NSH; 21	CSC; 33	ATL; 21		POC; 17	ROA; 23	MCH; 27	IRC; 35	GLN; 22	DAY; 34	DAR; 26		BRI; 26	TEX; 36	ROV; 31	LVS; 37		MAR; 29		23rd	395	
2023	RSS Racing	28	Ford																																	PHO; 31	23rd	395	
2024	Joe Gibbs Racing	19	Toyota	DAY	ATL	LVS	PHO	COA	RCH	MAR	TEX	TAL	DOV	DAR	CLT	PIR	SON	IOW	NHA	NSH	CSC	POC	IND; 17	MCH	DAY; 12	DAR; 11	ATL	GLN	BRI; 19	KAN	TAL	ROV	LVS	HOM	MAR	PHO	38th	93	

=== ARCA Menards Series ===
(key) (Bold – Pole position awarded by qualifying time. Italics – Pole position earned by points standings or practice time. * – Most laps led.)

ARCA Menards Series results
Year	Team	No.	Make	1	2	3	4	5	6	7	8	9	10	11	12	13	14	15	16	17	18	19	20	AMSC	Pts	Ref
2018	Chad Bryant Racing	77	Ford	DAY	NSH; 16	SLM; 11	TAL; 2	TOL; 3	CLT; 18	POC; 7	MCH; 5	MAD; 12	GTW; 8	CHI; 13	IOW; 5	ELK; 3	POC; 26	ISF; 16	BLN; 1	DSF; 11	SLM; 11	IRP; 13	KAN; 21	8th	4000	
2019	Chad Bryant Racing	77	Ford	DAY; 21	FIF; 11	SLM; 9	TAL; 10	NSH; 6	TOL; 17	CLT; 12	POC; 8		MAD; 9	GTW; 11	CHI; 11	ELK; 7	IOW; 9		ISF; 10	DSF; 11	SLM; 6	IRP; 10	KAN; 9	5th	4610	
2019	Chad Bryant Racing	77	Chevy									MCH; 4						POC; 10						5th	4610	

==== ARCA Menards Series East ====
ARCA Menards Series East results
Year	Team	No.	Make	1	2	3	4	5	6	7	8	9	10	11	12	13	14	AMSEC	Pts	Ref
2018	Calabrese Motorsports	43	Toyota	NSM; 15	BRI	LGY	SBO	SBO	MEM	NJM	THO	NHA	IOW	GLN	GTW	NHA	DOV	51st	29	
2019	Chad Bryant Racing	22	Ford	NSM	BRI	SBO	SBO	MEM	NHA	IOW	GLN	BRI; 16	GTW	NHA	DOV			44th	28	
2020	Visconti Motorsports	74	Ford	NSM	TOL	DOV; 17	TOL	BRI	FIF									47th	27	

=== CARS Late Model Stock Car Tour ===
(key) (Bold – Pole position awarded by qualifying time. Italics – Pole position earned by points standings or practice time. * – Most laps led. ** – All laps led.)

CARS Late Model Stock Car Tour results
Year	Team	No.	Make	1	2	3	4	5	6	7	8	9	10	11	12	CLMSCTC	Pts	Ref
2018	Jamey Caudill	12J	Ford	TCM; DNQ	MYB; 17	ROU	HCY	BRI	ACE	CCS	KPT	HCY	WKS	ROU	SBO	59th	18	

=== CARS Super Late Model Tour ===
(key)

CARS Super Late Model Tour results
Year	Team	No.	Make	1	2	3	4	5	6	7	8	9	10	11	12	13	CSLMTC	Pts	Ref
2017	Jamie Yelton	12G	N/A	CON; 20	DOM	DOM	HCY	HCY	BRI	AND	ROU	TCM	ROU	HCY	CON	SBO	51st	1	
2018	N/A	59	Chevy	MYB	NSH	ROU	HCY	BRI	AND	HCY; DNQ	ROU	SBO					53rd	2	

^{*} Season still in progress
