= 2020 Go Bowling 250 =

Race details
- Race 24 of 33 of the 2020 NASCAR Xfinity Series
- Date: September 11, 2020
- Official name: Go Bowling 250
- Location: Richmond, Virginia, Richmond Raceway
- Course: Permanent racing facility
- Course length: 0.75 miles (1.21 km)
- Distance: 250 laps, 187.5 mi (301.8 km)
- Scheduled distance: 250 laps, 187.5 mi (301.8 km)
- Average speed: 91.476 miles per hour (147.216 km/h)

Pole position
Driver	Ross Chastain	Kaulig Racing
- Grid positions set by competition-based formula

Most laps led
Driver	Justin Allgaier	JR Motorsports
- Laps: 78

Winner
No. 7	Justin Allgaier	JR Motorsports

Radio in the United States
- Radio: Motor Racing Network

The 2020 Go Bowling 250 was the 24th stock car race of the 2020 NASCAR Xfinity Series season, and the 39th iteration of the event. The race was held on Friday, September 11, 2020 in Richmond, Virginia at Richmond Raceway, a 0.75 miles (1.21 km) permanent D-shaped asphalt racetrack. The race took the scheduled 250 laps to complete. At race's end, Justin Allgaier of JR Motorsports would win his 13th NASCAR Xfinity Series race of his career and the 2nd of the season. To fill out the podium, Justin Haley of Kaulig Racing and Kyle Busch of Kyle Busch Motorsports would finish 2nd and 3rd, respectively.

== Background ==
Richmond Raceway is a 3/4-mile (1.2 km), D-shaped, asphalt race track located just outside Richmond, Virginia in Henrico County. It hosts the NASCAR Cup Series and Xfinity Series. Known as "America's premier short track", it formerly hosted an IndyCar Series race and two USAC sprint car races.

=== Entry list ===
#	Driver	Team	Make	Sponsor
0	Jeffrey Earnhardt	JD Motorsports	Chevrolet	NYPD Never Forget
1	Michael Annett	JR Motorsports	Chevrolet	Pilot Flying J
02	Brett Moffitt	Our Motorsports	Chevrolet	Robert B. Our Co.
4	Jesse Little	JD Motorsports	Chevrolet	FDNY Never Forget
5	Matt Mills	B. J. McLeod Motorsports	Chevrolet	J. F. Electric
6	B. J. McLeod	JD Motorsports	Chevrolet	FDNY Never Forget
7	Justin Allgaier	JR Motorsports	Chevrolet	FilterTime
07	Joey Gase	SS-Green Light Racing	Chevrolet	Donate Life Virginia
8	Jeb Burton	JR Motorsports	Chevrolet	State Water Heaters
08	Joe Graf Jr.	SS-Green Light Racing	Chevrolet	Bucked Up Energy
9	Noah Gragson	JR Motorsports	Chevrolet	Bass Pro Shops, Black Rifle Coffee Company
10	Ross Chastain	Kaulig Racing	Chevrolet	Nutrien Ag Solutions
11	Justin Haley	Kaulig Racing	Chevrolet	LeafFilter Gutter Protection
13	Stephen Leicht	MBM Motorsports	Toyota	RoofClaim.com, Jani-King
15	Colby Howard	JD Motorsports	Chevrolet	Project Hope Foundation Never Forget
18	Riley Herbst	Joe Gibbs Racing	Toyota	Monster Energy
19	Brandon Jones	Joe Gibbs Racing	Toyota	Menards, Inspire
20	Harrison Burton	Joe Gibbs Racing	Toyota	DEX Imaging, Morton Buildings
21	Kaz Grala	Richard Childress Racing	Chevrolet	Ruedebusch Development & Construction
22	Austin Cindric	Team Penske	Ford	PPG Industries
36	Alex Labbé	DGM Racing	Chevrolet	La Rue Industrial Snowblowers, Rousseau Metal
39	Ryan Sieg	RSS Racing	Chevrolet	CMR Construction & Roofing
44	Tommy Joe Martins	Martins Motorsports	Chevrolet	AAN Adjusters
47	Kyle Weatherman	Mike Harmon Racing	Chevrolet	Honor and Sacrifice, The Journey Home Project
51	Jeremy Clements	Jeremy Clements Racing	Chevrolet	Repairables.com
52	Kody Vanderwal	Jimmy Means Racing	Chevrolet	Jimmy Means Racing
54	Kyle Busch	Joe Gibbs Racing	Toyota	Starburst Duos
61	Chad Finchum	Hattori Racing Enterprises	Toyota	Hattori Racing Enterprises
66	Timmy Hill	MBM Motorsports	Toyota	CrashClaimsR.Us
68	Brandon Brown	Brandonbilt Motorsports	Chevrolet	Larry's Hard Lemonade
74	Bayley Currey	Mike Harmon Racing	Chevrolet	Team Dietz
78	Mason Massey	B. J. McLeod Motorsports	Toyota	A-Z Companies
90	Dexter Bean	DGM Racing	Chevrolet	Sleep Well Sleep Disorder Specialists, Alpha Prime Regimen
92	Josh Williams	DGM Racing	Chevrolet	Alloy Employer Services, Sleep Well Sleep Disorder Specialists
93	Myatt Snider	RSS Racing	Chevrolet	Superior Essex
98	Chase Briscoe	Stewart-Haas Racing	Ford	Go Bowling
99	Vinnie Miller	B. J. McLeod Motorsports	Chevrolet	Koolbox ICE
Official entry list

== Starting lineup ==
The starting lineup was determined by a metric qualifying system based on the results and fastest lap of the previous race, the 2020 Sport Clips Haircuts VFW 200 and owner's points. As a result, Ross Chastain of Kaulig Racing won the pole.

Pos.	#	Driver	Team	Make
1	10	Ross Chastain	Kaulig Racing	Chevrolet
2	19	Brandon Jones	Joe Gibbs Racing	Toyota
3	20	Harrison Burton	Joe Gibbs Racing	Toyota
4	9	Noah Gragson	JR Motorsports	Chevrolet
5	98	Chase Briscoe	Stewart-Haas Racing	Ford
6	39	Ryan Sieg	RSS Racing	Chevrolet
7	22	Austin Cindric	Team Penske	Ford
8	18	Riley Herbst	Joe Gibbs Racing	Toyota
9	1	Michael Annett	JR Motorsports	Chevrolet
10	11	Justin Haley	Kaulig Racing	Chevrolet
11	93	Myatt Snider	RSS Racing	Chevrolet
12	92	Josh Williams	DGM Racing	Chevrolet
13	68	Brandon Brown	Brandonbilt Motorsports	Chevrolet
14	4	Jesse Little	JD Motorsports	Chevrolet
15	36	Alex Labbé	DGM Racing	Chevrolet
16	7	Justin Allgaier	JR Motorsports	Chevrolet
17	0	Jeffrey Earnhardt	JD Motorsports	Chevrolet
18	15	Colby Howard	JD Motorsports	Chevrolet
19	51	Jeremy Clements	Jeremy Clements Racing	Chevrolet
20	02	Brett Moffitt	Our Motorsports	Chevrolet
21	44	Tommy Joe Martins	Martins Motorsports	Chevrolet
22	5	Matt Mills	B. J. McLeod Motorsports	Chevrolet
23	08	Joe Graf Jr.	SS-Green Light Racing	Chevrolet
24	21	Kaz Grala	Richard Childress Racing	Chevrolet
25	61	Chad Finchum	Hattori Racing Enterprises	Toyota
26	74	Bayley Currey	Mike Harmon Racing	Chevrolet
27	90	Dexter Bean	DGM Racing	Chevrolet
28	8	Jeb Burton	JR Motorsports	Chevrolet
29	54	Kyle Busch	Joe Gibbs Racing	Toyota
30	78	Mason Massey	B. J. McLeod Motorsports	Toyota
31	07	Joey Gase	SS-Green Light Racing	Chevrolet
32	6	B. J. McLeod	JD Motorsports	Chevrolet
33	52	Kody Vanderwal	Jimmy Means Racing	Chevrolet
34	99	Vinnie Miller	B. J. McLeod Motorsports	Chevrolet
35	13	Stephen Leicht	MBM Motorsports	Toyota
36	47	Kyle Weatherman	Mike Harmon Racing	Chevrolet
37	66	Timmy Hill	MBM Motorsports	Toyota
Official starting lineup

== Race results ==
Stage 1 Laps: 75

Fin	#	Driver	Team	Make	Pts
1	22	Austin Cindric	Team Penske	Ford	10
2	98	Chase Briscoe	Stewart-Haas Racing	Ford	9
3	10	Ross Chastain	Kaulig Racing	Chevrolet	8
4	11	Justin Haley	Kaulig Racing	Chevrolet	7
5	7	Justin Allgaier	JR Motorsports	Chevrolet	6
6	1	Michael Annett	JR Motorsports	Chevrolet	5
7	21	Kaz Grala	Richard Childress Racing	Chevrolet	4
8	54	Kyle Busch	Joe Gibbs Racing	Toyota	0
9	02	Brett Moffitt	Our Motorsports	Chevrolet	0
10	51	Jeremy Clements	Jeremy Clements Racing	Chevrolet	1

Stage 2 Laps: 75

Fin	#	Driver	Team	Make	Pts
1	7	Justin Allgaier	JR Motorsports	Chevrolet	10
2	10	Ross Chastain	Kaulig Racing	Chevrolet	9
3	11	Justin Haley	Kaulig Racing	Chevrolet	8
4	54	Kyle Busch	Joe Gibbs Racing	Toyota	0
5	21	Kaz Grala	Richard Childress Racing	Chevrolet	6
6	22	Austin Cindric	Team Penske	Ford	5
7	02	Brett Moffitt	Our Motorsports	Chevrolet	0
8	9	Noah Gragson	JR Motorsports	Chevrolet	3
9	8	Jeb Burton	JR Motorsports	Chevrolet	2
10	1	Michael Annett	JR Motorsports	Chevrolet	1

Stage 3 Laps: 100

Fin	St	#	Driver	Team	Make	Laps	Led	Status	Pts
1	16	7	Justin Allgaier	JR Motorsports	Chevrolet	250	78	running	56
2	10	11	Justin Haley	Kaulig Racing	Chevrolet	250	51	running	50
3	29	54	Kyle Busch	Joe Gibbs Racing	Toyota	250	0	running	0
4	7	22	Austin Cindric	Team Penske	Ford	250	64	running	48
5	1	10	Ross Chastain	Kaulig Racing	Chevrolet	250	39	running	49
6	20	02	Brett Moffitt	Our Motorsports	Chevrolet	250	0	running	0
7	9	1	Michael Annett	JR Motorsports	Chevrolet	250	0	running	36
8	4	9	Noah Gragson	JR Motorsports	Chevrolet	250	0	running	32
9	24	21	Kaz Grala	Richard Childress Racing	Chevrolet	250	0	running	38
10	8	18	Riley Herbst	Joe Gibbs Racing	Toyota	249	0	running	27
11	5	98	Chase Briscoe	Stewart-Haas Racing	Ford	249	7	running	35
12	6	39	Ryan Sieg	RSS Racing	Chevrolet	249	0	running	25
13	22	5	Matt Mills	B. J. McLeod Motorsports	Chevrolet	249	0	running	24
14	2	19	Brandon Jones	Joe Gibbs Racing	Toyota	249	0	running	23
15	21	44	Tommy Joe Martins	Martins Motorsports	Chevrolet	249	0	running	22
16	3	20	Harrison Burton	Joe Gibbs Racing	Toyota	249	11	running	21
17	19	51	Jeremy Clements	Jeremy Clements Racing	Chevrolet	248	0	running	21
18	13	68	Brandon Brown	Brandonbilt Motorsports	Chevrolet	248	0	running	19
19	23	08	Joe Graf Jr.	SS-Green Light Racing	Chevrolet	248	0	running	18
20	31	07	Joey Gase	SS-Green Light Racing	Chevrolet	248	0	running	17
21	26	74	Bayley Currey	Mike Harmon Racing	Chevrolet	248	0	running	0
22	12	92	Josh Williams	DGM Racing	Chevrolet	247	0	running	15
23	15	36	Alex Labbé	DGM Racing	Chevrolet	247	0	running	14
24	17	0	Jeffrey Earnhardt	JD Motorsports	Chevrolet	247	0	running	13
25	14	4	Jesse Little	JD Motorsports	Chevrolet	247	0	running	12
26	36	47	Kyle Weatherman	Mike Harmon Racing	Chevrolet	247	0	running	11
27	30	78	Mason Massey	B. J. McLeod Motorsports	Toyota	246	0	running	10
28	33	52	Kody Vanderwal	Jimmy Means Racing	Chevrolet	246	0	running	9
29	32	6	B. J. McLeod	JD Motorsports	Chevrolet	245	0	running	8
30	34	99	Vinnie Miller	B. J. McLeod Motorsports	Chevrolet	242	0	running	7
31	27	90	Dexter Bean	DGM Racing	Chevrolet	241	0	running	6
32	28	8	Jeb Burton	JR Motorsports	Chevrolet	233	0	running	7
33	18	15	Colby Howard	JD Motorsports	Chevrolet	220	0	running	4
34	35	13	Stephen Leicht	MBM Motorsports	Toyota	88	0	axle	3
35	11	93	Myatt Snider	RSS Racing	Chevrolet	46	0	crash	2
36	37	66	Timmy Hill	MBM Motorsports	Toyota	4	0	vibration	0
37	25	61	Chad Finchum	Hattori Racing Enterprises	Toyota	246	0	disqualified	1
Official race results

Previous race: 2020 Sport Clips Haircuts VFW 200	NASCAR Xfinity Series; 2020 season	Next race: 2020 Virginia is for Racing Lovers 250
