= 2020 Kansas Lottery 300 =

Race details
- Race 30 of 33 in the 2020 NASCAR Xfinity Series season
- Date: October 17, 2020
- Location: Kansas Speedway in Kansas City, Kansas
- Course: Permanent racing facility
- Course length: 1.50 miles (2.41 km)
- Distance: 200 laps, 300.0 mi (482.80 km)
- Average speed: 112.735 mph

Pole position
Driver	Noah Gragson	JR Motorsports
- Grid positions set by competition-based formula

Most laps led
Driver	Chase Briscoe	Stewart-Haas Racing
- Laps: 159

Winner
No. 98	Chase Briscoe	Kaulig Racing

The 2020 Kansas Lottery 300 was a NASCAR Xfinity Series race held on October 17, 2020. It was contested over 200 laps on the 1.50-mile (2.41 km) oval. It was the thirtieth race of the 2020 NASCAR Xfinity Series season, the fourth race of the playoffs, and the first race in the Round of 8. Stewart-Haas Racing driver Chase Briscoe collected his ninth win of the season.

== Report ==
=== Background ===
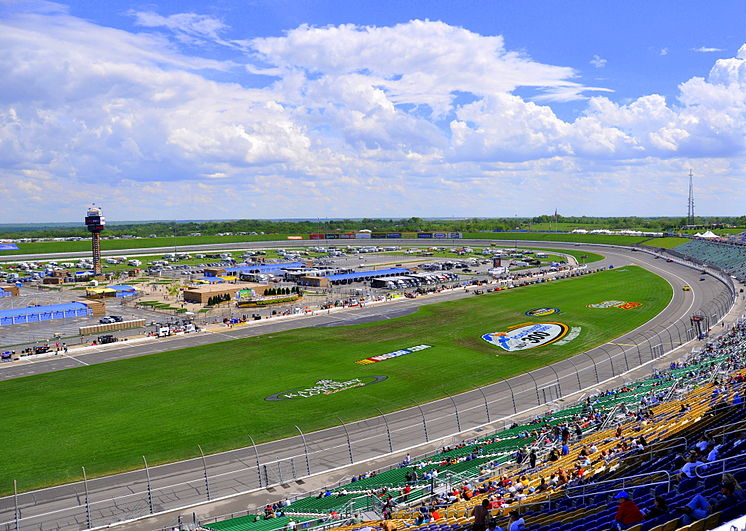
Kansas Speedway, the track where the race was held

Kansas Speedway is a 1.5-mile (2.4 km) tri-oval race track in Kansas City, Kansas. It was built in 2001, and it currently hosts two annual NASCAR race weekends. The IndyCar Series also held races at the venue until 2011. The speedway is owned and operated by the International Speedway Corporation.

=== Entry list ===
- (R) denotes rookie driver.
- (i) denotes driver who is ineligible for series driver points.

No.	Driver	Team	Manufacturer
0	Jeffrey Earnhardt	JD Motorsports	Chevrolet
1	Michael Annett	JR Motorsports	Chevrolet
02	Brett Moffitt (i)	Our Motorsports	Chevrolet
4	B. J. McLeod	JD Motorsports	Chevrolet
5	Matt Mills	B. J. McLeod Motorsports	Toyota
6	Ryan Vargas	JD Motorsports	Chevrolet
7	Justin Allgaier	JR Motorsports	Chevrolet
07	David Starr	SS-Green Light Racing	Chevrolet
8	Daniel Hemric	JR Motorsports	Chevrolet
08	Joe Graf Jr. (R)	SS-Green Light Racing	Chevrolet
9	Noah Gragson	JR Motorsports	Chevrolet
10	Ross Chastain	Kaulig Racing	Chevrolet
11	Justin Haley	Kaulig Racing	Chevrolet
13	Timmy Hill (i)	MBM Motorsports	Toyota
15	Jesse Little (R)	JD Motorsports	Chevrolet
18	Riley Herbst (R)	Joe Gibbs Racing	Toyota
19	Brandon Jones	Joe Gibbs Racing	Toyota
20	Harrison Burton (R)	Joe Gibbs Racing	Toyota
21	Anthony Alfredo	Richard Childress Racing	Chevrolet
22	Austin Cindric	Team Penske	Ford
36	Alex Labbé	DGM Racing	Chevrolet
39	Ryan Sieg	RSS Racing	Chevrolet
44	Tommy Joe Martins	Martins Motorsports	Chevrolet
47	Josh Reaume (i)	Mike Harmon Racing	Chevrolet
51	Jeremy Clements	Jeremy Clements Racing	Chevrolet
52	Kody Vanderwal (R)	Means Racing	Chevrolet
61	Austin Hill (i)	Hattori Racing Enterprises	Toyota
66	Stephen Leicht	MBM Motorsports	Toyota
68	Brandon Brown	Brandonbilt Motorsports	Chevrolet
74	Bayley Currey (i)	Mike Harmon Racing	Chevrolet
78	Vinnie Miller	B. J. McLeod Motorsports	Toyota
90	Dexter Bean	DGM Racing	Chevrolet
92	Josh Williams	DGM Racing	Chevrolet
93	Myatt Snider (R)	RSS Racing	Chevrolet
98	Chase Briscoe	Stewart-Haas Racing	Ford
99	Jesse Iwuji (i)	B. J. McLeod Motorsports	Chevrolet
Official entry list

== Qualifying ==
Noah Gragson was awarded the pole based on competition based formula.

=== Qualifying results ===
Pos	No	Driver	Team	Manufacturer
1	9	Noah Gragson	JR Motorsports	Chevrolet
2	22	Austin Cindric	Team Penske	Ford
3	8	Daniel Hemric	JR Motorsports	Chevrolet
4	10	Ross Chastain	Kaulig Racing	Chevrolet
5	19	Brandon Jones	Joe Gibbs Racing	Toyota
6	98	Chase Briscoe	Stewart-Haas Racing	Ford
7	7	Justin Allgaier	JR Motorsports	Chevrolet
8	39	Ryan Sieg	RSS Racing	Chevrolet
9	11	Justin Haley	Kaulig Racing	Chevrolet
10	36	Alex Labbé	DGM Racing	Chevrolet
11	1	Michael Annett	JR Motorsports	Chevrolet
12	18	Riley Herbst (R)	Joe Gibbs Racing	Toyota
13	51	Jeremy Clements	Jeremy Clements Racing	Chevrolet
14	0	Jeffrey Earnhardt	JD Motorsports	Chevrolet
15	93	Myatt Snider (R)	RSS Racing	Chevrolet
16	68	Brandon Brown	Brandonbilt Motorsports	Chevrolet
17	6	Ryan Vargas	JD Motorsports	Chevrolet
18	20	Harrison Burton	Joe Gibbs Racing	Toyota
19	08	Joe Graf Jr. (R)	SS-Green Light Racing	Chevrolet
20	4	B. J. McLeod	JD Motorsports	Chevrolet
21	07	David Starr	SS-Green Light Racing	Chevrolet
22	44	Tommy Joe Martins	Martins Motorsports	Chevrolet
23	92	Josh Williams	DGM Racing	Chevrolet
24	5	Matt Mills	B. J. McLeod Motorsports	Toyota
25	21	Anthony Alfredo	Richard Childress Racing	Chevrolet
26	52	Kody Vanderwal (R)	Means Motorsports	Chevrolet
27	02	Brett Moffitt (i)	Our Motorsports	Chevrolet
28	78	Vinnie Miller	B. J. McLeod Motorsports	Toyota
29	61	Austin Hill (i)	Hattori Racing Enterprises	Toyota
30	15	Jesse Little (R)	JD Motorsports	Chevrolet
31	13	Timmy Hill (i)	MBM Motorsports	Toyota
32	74	Bayley Currey (i)	Mike Harmon Racing	Chevrolet
33	66	Stephen Leicht	MBM Motorsports	Toyota
34	90	Dexter Bean	DGM Racing	Chevrolet
35	99	Jesse Iwuji	B. J. McLeod Motorsports	Chevrolet
36	47	Josh Reaume (i)	Mike Harmon Racing	Chevrolet
Official qualifying results

== Race ==
=== Race results ===
==== Stage Results ====
Stage One Laps: 45

Pos	No	Driver	Team	Manufacturer	Points
1	98	Chase Briscoe	Stewart-Haas Racing	Ford	10
2	19	Brandon Jones	Joe Gibbs Racing	Toyota	9
3	20	Harrison Burton	Joe Gibbs Racing	Toyota	8
4	21	Anthony Alfredo	Richard Childress Racing	Chevrolet	7
5	10	Ross Chastain	Kaulig Racing	Chevrolet	6
6	18	Riley Herbst (R)	Joe Gibbs Racing	Toyota	5
7	7	Justin Allgaier	JR Motorsports	Chevrolet	4
8	39	Ryan Sieg	RSS Racing	Chevrolet	3
9	68	Brandon Brown	Brandonbilt Motorsports	Chevrolet	2
10	11	Justin Haley	Kaulig Racing	Chevrolet	1

Stage Two Laps: 45

Pos	No	Driver	Team	Manufacturer	Points
1	98	Chase Briscoe	Stewart-Haas Racing	Ford	10
2	19	Brandon Jones	Joe Gibbs Racing	Toyota	9
3	21	Anthony Alfredo	Richard Childress Racing	Chevrolet	8
4	20	Harrison Burton	Joe Gibbs Racing	Toyota	7
5	10	Ross Chastain	Kaulig Racing	Chevrolet	6
6	18	Riley Herbst (R)	Joe Gibbs Racing	Toyota	5
7	7	Justin Allgaier	JR Motorsports	Chevrolet	4
8	39	Ryan Sieg	RSS Racing	Chevrolet	3
9	02	Brett Moffitt (i)	Our Motorsports	Chevrolet	0
10	61	Austin Hill (i)	Hattori Racing Enterprises	Toyota	0

=== Final Stage Results ===
Laps: 110

Pos	Grid	No	Driver	Team	Manufacturer	Laps	Points	Status
1	6	98	Chase Briscoe	Stewart-Haas Racing	Ford	200	60	Running
2	3	8	Daniel Hemric	JR Motorsports	Chevrolet	200	35	Running
3	8	39	Ryan Sieg	RSS Racing	Chevrolet	200	40	Running
4	9	11	Justin Haley	Kaulig Racing	Chevrolet	200	34	Running
5	29	61	Austin Hill (i)	Hattori Racing Enterprises	Toyota	200	0	Running
6	23	92	Josh Williams	DGM Racing	Chevrolet	200	31	Running
7	27	02	Brett Moffitt (i)	Our Motorsports	Chevrolet	200	0	Running
8	11	1	Michael Annett	JR Motorsports	Chevrolet	200	29	Running
9	5	19	Brandon Jones	Joe Gibbs Racing	Toyota	200	46	Running
10	7	7	Justin Allgaier	JR Motorsports	Chevrolet	200	35	Running
11	18	20	Harrison Burton (R)	Joe Gibbs Racing	Toyota	200	41	Running
12	4	10	Ross Chastain	Kaulig Racing	Chevrolet	200	37	Running
13	16	68	Brandon Brown	Brandonbilt Motorsports	Chevrolet	200	26	Running
14	22	44	Tommy Joe Martins	Martins Motorsports	Chevrolet	200	23	Running
15	13	51	Jeremy Clements	Jeremy Clements Racing	Chevrolet	199	22	Running
16	34	90	Dexter Bean	DGM Racing	Chevrolet	198	21	Running
17	20	4	B. J. McLeod	JD Motorsports	Chevrolet	198	20	Running
18	32	74	Bayley Currey (i)	Mike Harmon Racing	Chevrolet	197	0	Running
19	30	15	Jesse Little (R)	JD Motorsports	Chevrolet	197	18	Running
20	14	0	Jeffrey Earnhardt	JD Motorsports	Chevrolet	197	17	Running
21	15	93	Myatt Snider	RSS Racing	Chevrolet	197	16	Running
22	31	13	Timmy Hill (i)	MBM Motorsports	Toyota	197	0	Running
23	10	36	Alex Labbé	DGM Racing	Chevrolet	197	13	Running
24	21	07	David Starr	SS-Green Light Racing	Chevrolet	195	13	Running
25	24	5	Matt Mills	B. J. McLeod Motorsports	Toyota	193	12	Running
26	26	52	Kody Vanderwal (R)	Means Motorsports	Chevrolet	191	11	Running
27	35	99	Jesse Iwuji (i)	B. J. McLeod Motorsports	Chevrolet	190	0	Running
28	2	22	Austin Cindric	Team Penske	Ford	173	9	Running
29	25	21	Anthony Alfredo	Richard Childress Racing	Chevrolet	172	23	Accident
30	12	18	Riley Herbst (R)	Joe Gibbs Racing	Toyota	172	17	Accident
31	28	78	Vinnie Miller	B. J. McLeod Motorsports	Chevrolet	169	6	Running
32	19	08	Joe Graf Jr. (R)	SS-Green Light Racing	Chevrolet	158	5	Rear Gear
33	36	47	Josh Reaume (i)	Mike Harmon Racing	Chevrolet	101	0	Brakes
34	17	6	Ryan Vargas	JD Motorsports	Chevrolet	81	3	Power Steering
35	33	66	Stephen Leicht	MBM Motorsports	Toyota	59	2	Fuel Pump
36	1	9	Noah Gragson	JR Motorsports	Chevrolet	16	1	DVP
Official race results

=== Race statistics ===
- Lead changes: 10 among 6 different drivers
- Cautions/Laps: 10 for 45
- Time of race: 2 hours, 39 minutes, and 40 seconds
- Average speed: 112.735 mph (181.429 km/h)

Previous race: 2020 Drive for the Cure 250	NASCAR Xfinity Series; 2020 season	Next race: 2020 O'Reilly Auto Parts 300
