= 2021 Super Start Batteries 188 =

Race details
- Race 2 of 33 in the 2021 NASCAR Xfinity Series season
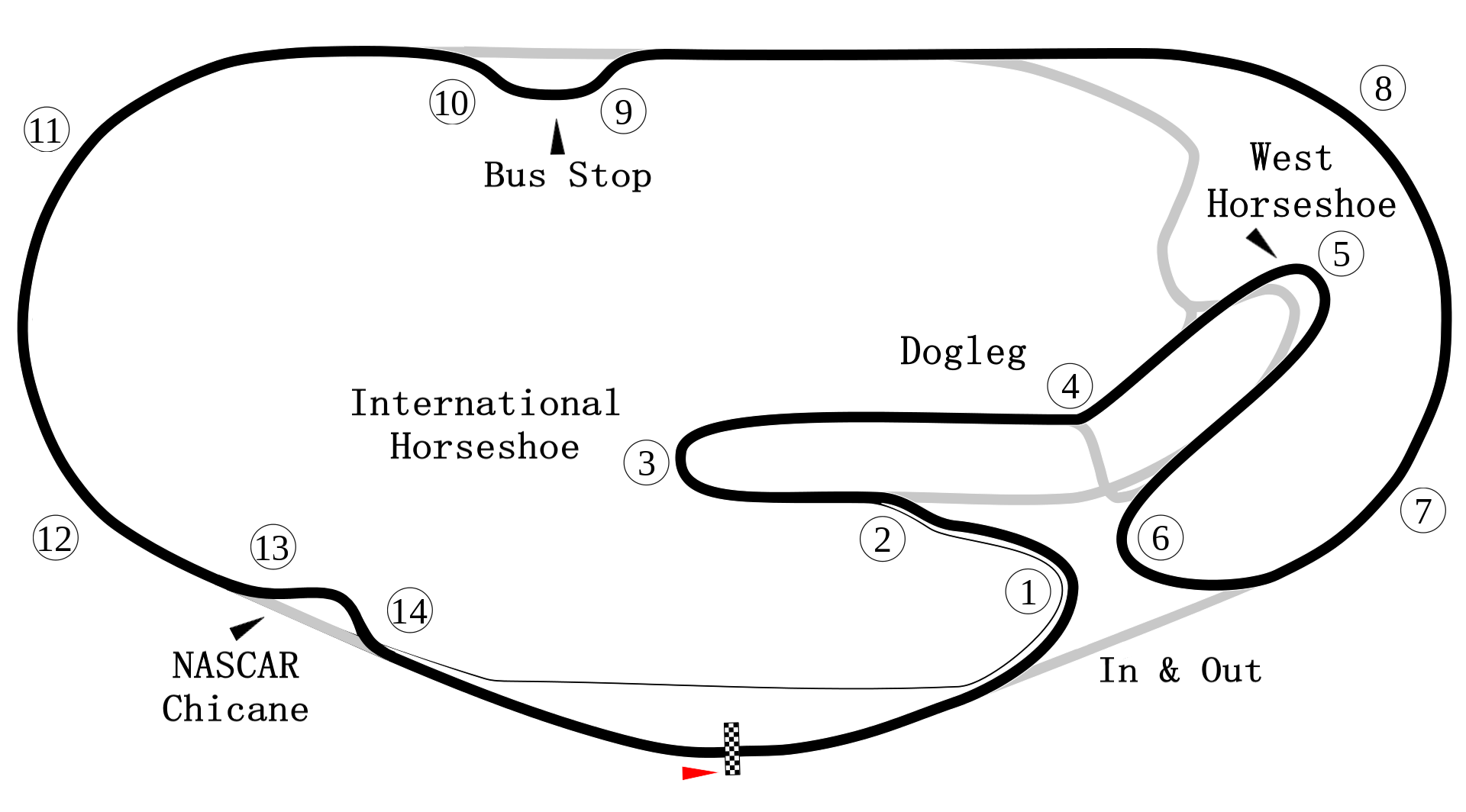
- Daytona International Speedway Road Course
- Date: February 20, 2021
- Location: Daytona International Speedway Road Course in Daytona Beach, Florida
- Course: Permanent racing facility
- Course length: 3.610 miles (5.810 km)
- Distance: 56 laps, 202.160 mi (325.345 km)
- Scheduled distance: 52 laps, 187.720 mi (302.106 km)
- Average speed: 78.213 mph

Pole position
Driver	Brett Moffitt	Our Motorsports
- Grid positions set by competition-based formula

Most laps led
Driver	Austin Cindric	Team Penske
- Laps: 29

Winner
No. 54	Ty Gibbs	Joe Gibbs Racing

Television in the United States
- Network: FS1
- Announcers: Adam Alexander, Drew Blickensderfer, and Joey Logano

The 2021 Super Start Batteries 188 was a NASCAR Xfinity Series race held on February 20, 2021. It was contested over 56 laps—extended from 52 laps due to an overtime finish—on the 3.610-mile (5.810 km) asphalt road course. It was the second race of the 2021 NASCAR Xfinity Series season. Joe Gibbs Racing driver Ty Gibbs, in his first career start, collected his first career Xfinity Series win.

== Background ==
Added as a replacement for the cancelled Production Alliance Group 300 because of California restrictions related to the COVID-19 pandemic, the 2021 race was scheduled for 52 laps on the 3.610-mile (5.810 km) road course, it was the second race of the 2021 NASCAR Xfinity Series season.

== Entry list ==
- (R) denotes rookie driver.
- (i) denotes driver who is ineligible for series driver points.

No.	Driver	Team	Manufacturer
0	Jeffrey Earnhardt	JD Motorsports	Chevrolet
1	Michael Annett	JR Motorsports	Chevrolet
02	Brett Moffitt(I)	Our Motorsports	Chevrolet
2	Myatt Snider	Richard Childress Racing	Chevrolet
4	Landon Cassill	JD Motorsports	Chevrolet
5	Matt Mills	B. J. McLeod Motorsports	Toyota
6	Ryan Vargas (R)	JD Motorsports	Chevrolet
7	Justin Allgaier	JR Motorsports	Chevrolet
07	Joe Graf Jr.	SS-Green Light Racing	Chevrolet
8	Miguel Paludo	JR Motorsports	Chevrolet
9	Noah Gragson	JR Motorsports	Chevrolet
10	Jeb Burton	Kaulig Racing	Chevrolet
11	Justin Haley	Kaulig Racing	Chevrolet
13	David Starr	MBM Motorsports	Toyota
15	Colby Howard	JD Motorsports	Chevrolet
16	A. J. Allmendinger	Kaulig Racing	Chevrolet
17	Cody Ware (I)	SS-Green Light Racing with Rick Ware Racing	Ford
18	Daniel Hemric	Joe Gibbs Racing	Toyota
19	Brandon Jones	Joe Gibbs Racing	Toyota
20	Harrison Burton	Joe Gibbs Racing	Toyota
22	Austin Cindric	Team Penske	Ford
23	Natalie Decker	RSS Racing with Reaume Brothers Racing	Chevrolet
26	Kris Wright (I)	Sam Hunt Racing	Toyota
36	Alex Labbé	DGM Racing	Chevrolet
39	Ryan Sieg	RSS Racing	Chevrolet
44	Tommy Joe Martins	Martins Motorsports	Chevrolet
47	Kyle Weatherman	Mike Harmon Racing	Chevrolet
48	Jade Buford (R)	Big Machine Racing Team	Chevrolet
51	Jeremy Clements	Jeremy Clements Racing	Chevrolet
52	Gray Gaulding	Means Racing	Chevrolet
54	Ty Gibbs	Joe Gibbs Racing	Toyota
61	Stephen Leicht	Hattori Racing Enterprises	Toyota
66	Timmy Hill (I)	MBM Motorsports	Ford
68	Brandon Brown	Brandonbilt Motorsports	Chevrolet
74	Bayley Currey	Mike Harmon Racing	Chevrolet
78	Jesse Little	B. J. McLeod Motorsports	Chevrolet
90	Preston Pardus	DGM Racing	Chevrolet
92	Josh Williams	DGM Racing	Chevrolet
98	Riley Herbst	Stewart-Haas Racing	Ford
99	Andy Lally	B. J. McLeod Motorsports	Chevrolet
Official entry list

== Qualifying ==
Brett Moffitt was awarded the pole for the race as determined by competition-based formula.

=== Starting Lineups ===
Pos	No	Driver	Team	Manufacturer
1	02	Brett Moffitt	Our Motorsports	Chevrolet
2	22	Austin Cindric	Team Penske	Ford
3	10	Jeb Burton	Kaulig Racing	Chevrolet
4	20	Harrison Burton	Joe Gibbs Racing	Toyota
5	18	Daniel Hemric	Joe Gibbs Racing	Toyota
6	16	A. J. Allmendinger	Kaulig Racing	Chevrolet
7	68	Brandon Brown	Brandonbilt Motorsports	Chevrolet
8	2	Myatt Snider	Richard Childress Racing	Chevrolet
9	9	Joe Graf Jr.	SS-Green Light Racing	Chevrolet
10	5	Matt Mills	B. J. McLeod Motorsports	Toyota
11	47	Kyle Weatherman	Mike Harmon Racing	Chevrolet
12	6	Ryan Vargas (R)	JD Motorsports	Chevrolet
13	78	Jesse Little	B. J. McLeod Motorsports	Chevrolet
14	4	Landon Cassill	JD Motorsports	Chevrolet
15	54	Ty Gibbs(R)	Joe Gibbs Racing	Toyota
16	98	Riley Herbst	Stewart-Haas Racing	Ford
17	66	Timmy Hill (I)	MBM Motorsports	Ford
18	51	Jeremy Clements	Jeremy Clements Racing	Chevrolet
19	26	Kris Wright (I)	Sam Hunt Racing	Toyota
20	44	Tommy Joe Martins	Martins Motorsports	Chevrolet
21	23	Natalie Decker	Our Motorsports	Chevrolet
22	92	Josh Williams	DGM Racing	Chevrolet
23	90	Preston Pardus	DGM Racing	Chevrolet
24	99	Andy Lally	B. J. McLeod Motorsports	Chevrolet
25	7	Justin Allgaier	JR Motorsports	Chevrolet
26	9	Noah Gragson	JR Motorsports	Chevrolet
27	39	Ryan Sieg	RSS Racing	Ford
28	48	Jade Buford (R)	Big Machine Racing Team	Chevrolet
29	11	Justin Haley	Kaulig Racing	Chevrolet
30	52	Gray Gaulding	Means Motorsports	Chevrolet
31	74	Bayley Currey	Mike Harmon Racing	Chevrolet
32	15	Colby Howard	JD Motorsports	Chevrolet
33	1	Michael Annett	JR Motorsports	Chevrolet
34	61	Stephen Leicht	Hattori Racing Enterprises	Toyota
35	8	Miguel Paludo	JR Motorsports	Chevrolet
36	36	Alex Labbé	DGM Racing	Chevrolet
37	0	Jeffrey Earnhardt	JD Motorsports	Chevrolet
38	17	Cody Ware (I)	SS-Green Light Racing with Rick Ware Racing	Ford
39	19	Brandon Jones	Joe Gibbs Racing	Toyota
40	13	David Starr	MBM Motorsports	Toyota
Official qualifying results

== Race ==
=== Race results ===
==== Stage Results ====
Stage One Laps: 15

Pos	No	Driver	Team	Manufacturer	Points
1	22	Austin Cindric	Team Penske	Ford	10
2	2	Myatt Snider	Richard Childress Racing	Chevrolet	9
3	98	Riley Herbst	Stewart-Haas Racing	Ford	8
4	51	Jeremy Clements	Jeremy Clements Racing	Chevrolet	7
5	99	Andy Lally	B. J. McLeod Motorsports	Chevrolet	6
6	68	Brandon Brown	Brandonbilt Motorsports	Chevrolet	5
7	20	Harrison Burton	Joe Gibbs Racing	Toyota	4
8	47	Kyle Weatherman	Mike Harmon Racing	Chevrolet	3
9	74	Bayley Currey	Mike Harmon Racing	Chevrolet	2
10	7	Justin Allgaier	JR Motorsports	Chevrolet	1

Stage Two Laps: 30

Pos	No	Driver	Team	Manufacturer	Points
1	54	Ty Gibbs	Joe Gibbs Racing	Toyota	10
2	20	Harrison Burton	Joe Gibbs Racing	Toyota	9
3	18	Daniel Hemric	Joe Gibbs Racing	Toyota	8
4	11	Justin Haley	Kaulig Racing	Chevrolet	7
5	7	Justin Allgaier	JR Motorsports	Chevrolet	6
6	22	Austin Cindric	Team Penske	Ford	5
7	19	Brandon Jones	Joe Gibbs Racing	Toyota	4
8	2	Myatt Snider	Richard Childress Racing	Chevrolet	3
9	90	Preston Pardus	DGM Racing	Chevrolet	2
10	51	Jeremy Clements	Jeremy Clements Racing	Chevrolet	1

=== Final Stage Results ===
Laps: 52

Pos	Grid	No	Driver	Team	Manufacturer	Laps	Points	Status
1	15	54	Ty Gibbs	Joe Gibbs Racing	Toyota	56	50	Running
2	2	22	Austin Cindric	Team Penske	Ford	56	50	Running
3	5	18	Daniel Hemric	Joe Gibbs Racing	Toyota	56	42	Running
4	39	19	Brandon Jones	Joe Gibbs Racing	Toyota	56	37	Running
5	3	10	Jeb Burton	Kaulig Racing	Chevrolet	56	32	Running
6	4	20	Harrison Burton	Joe Gibbs Racing	Toyota	56	44	Running
7	35	8	Miguel Paludo	JR Motorsports	Chevrolet	56	30	Running
8	7	68	Brandon Brown	Brandonbilt Motorsports	Chevrolet	56	34	Running
9	29	11	Justin Haley	Kaulig Racing	Chevrolet	56	35	Running
10	18	51	Jeremy Clements	Jeremy Clements Racing	Chevrolet	56	35	Running
11	1	02	Brett Moffitt (I)	Our Motorsports	Chevrolet	56	0	Running
12	14	4	Landon Cassill	JD Motorsports	Chevrolet	56	25	Running
13	8	2	Myatt Snider	Richard Childress Racing	Chevrolet	56	36	Running
14	13	78	Jesse Little	B. J. McLeod Motorsports	Chevrolet	56	23	Running
15	33	1	Michael Annett	JR Motorsports	Chevrolet	56	22	Running
16	11	47	Kyle Weatherman	Mike Harmon Racing	Chevrolet	56	24	Running
17	22	92	Josh Williams	DGM Racing	Chevrolet	56	20	Running
18	19	26	Kris Wright (I)	Sam Hunt Racing	Toyota	56	0	Running
19	10	5	Matt Mills	B. J. McLeod Motorsports	Toyota	56	18	Running
20	9	07	Joe Graf Jr.	SS-Green Light Racing	Chevrolet	56	17	Running
21	30	52	Gray Gaulding	Means Racing	Chevrolet	56	16	Running
22	36	36	Alex Labbé	DGM Racing	Chevrolet	56	15	Running
23	32	15	Colby Howard	JD Motorsports	Chevrolet	56	14	Running
24	20	44	Tommy Joe Martins	Martins Motorsports	Chevrolet	56	13	Running
25	38	17	Cody Ware	SS-Green Light Racing with Rick Ware Racing	Ford	56	12	Running
26	25	7	Justin Allgaier	JR Motorsports	Chevrolet	56	18	Running
27	27	39	Ryan Sieg	RSS Racing	Chevrolet	56	10	Running
28	26	9	Noah Gragson	JR Motorsports	Chevrolet	56	9	Running
29	34	61	Stephen Leicht	Hattori Racing Enterprises	Toyota	56	8	Running
30	37	0	Jeffrey Earnhardt	JD Motorsports	Chevrolet	56	7	Running
31	24	99	Andy Lally	B. J. McLeod Motorsports	Chevrolet	55	12	Running
32	31	74	Bayley Currey	Mike Harmon Racing	Chevrolet	55	7	Running
33	23	90	Preston Pardus	DGM Racing	Chevrolet	49	6	Transmission
34	17	66	Timmy Hill	MBM Motorsports	Toyota	46	3	Running
35	6	16	A. J. Allmendinger	Kaulig Racing	Chevrolet	43	2	Running
36	28	48	Jade Buford (R)	Big Machine Racing Team	Chevrolet	38	1	Suspension
37	12	6	Ryan Vargas (R)	JD Motorsports	Chevrolet	33	1	Running
38	40	13	David Starr	MBM Motorsports	Toyota	20	1	Transmission
39	16	98	Riley Herbst	Stewart-Haas Racing	Ford	15	9	Accident
40	21	23	Natalie Decker	RSS-Racing with Reaume Brothers Racing	Chevrolet	3	1	Accident
Official race results

=== Race statistics ===
- Lead changes: 11 among 8 different drivers
- Cautions/Laps: 7 for 14
- Time of race: 2 hours, 35 minutes, and 5 seconds
- Average speed: 78.213 mph (125.872 km/h)

Previous race: 2021 Beef. It's What's for Dinner. 300	NASCAR Xfinity Series; 2021 season	Next race: 2021 Contender Boats 250
