= 2020 NASCAR Xfinity Series =

American motorsport season

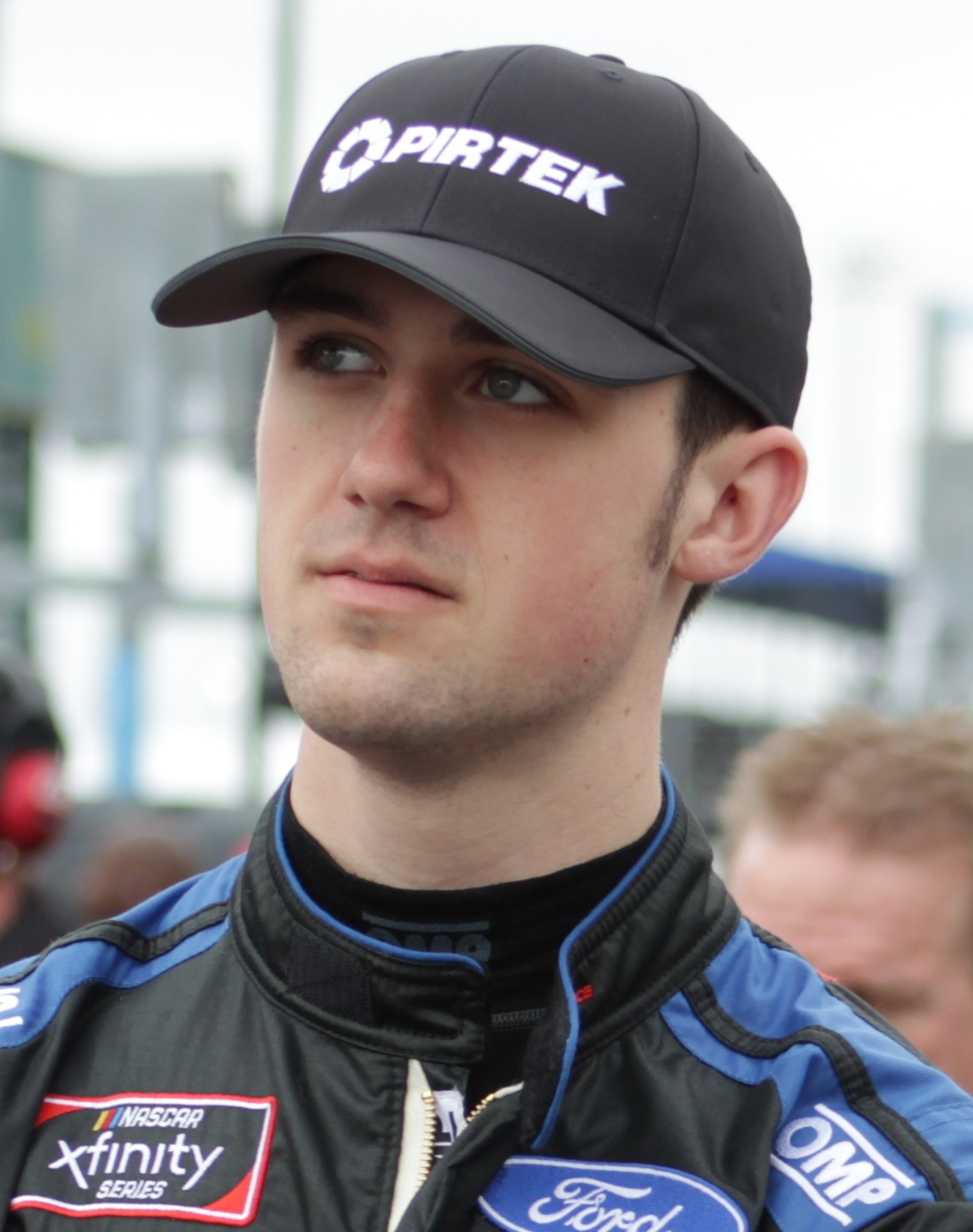
Austin Cindric, the 2020 Xfinity Series champion and regular season champion

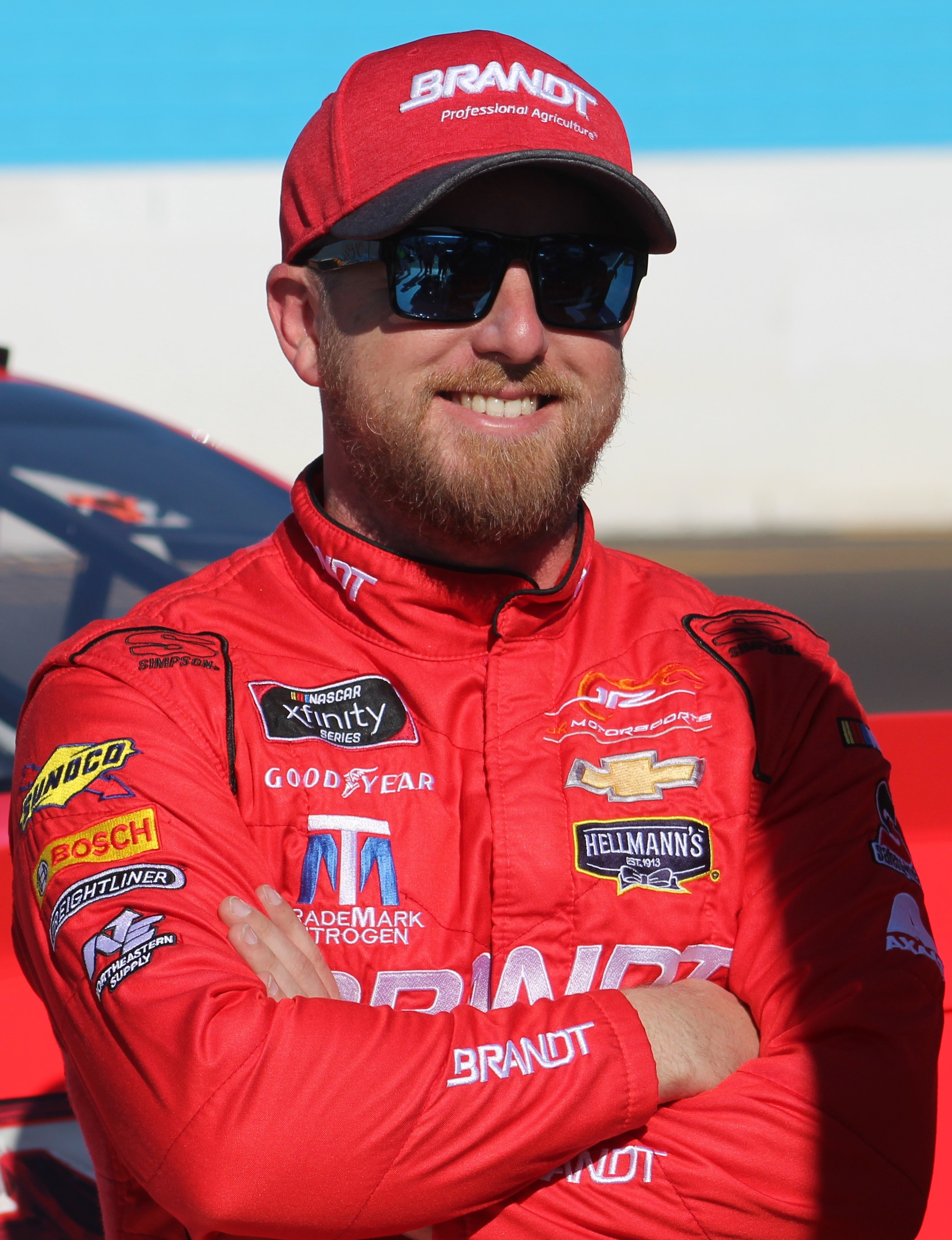
Justin Allgaier finished second behind Cindric in the championship.

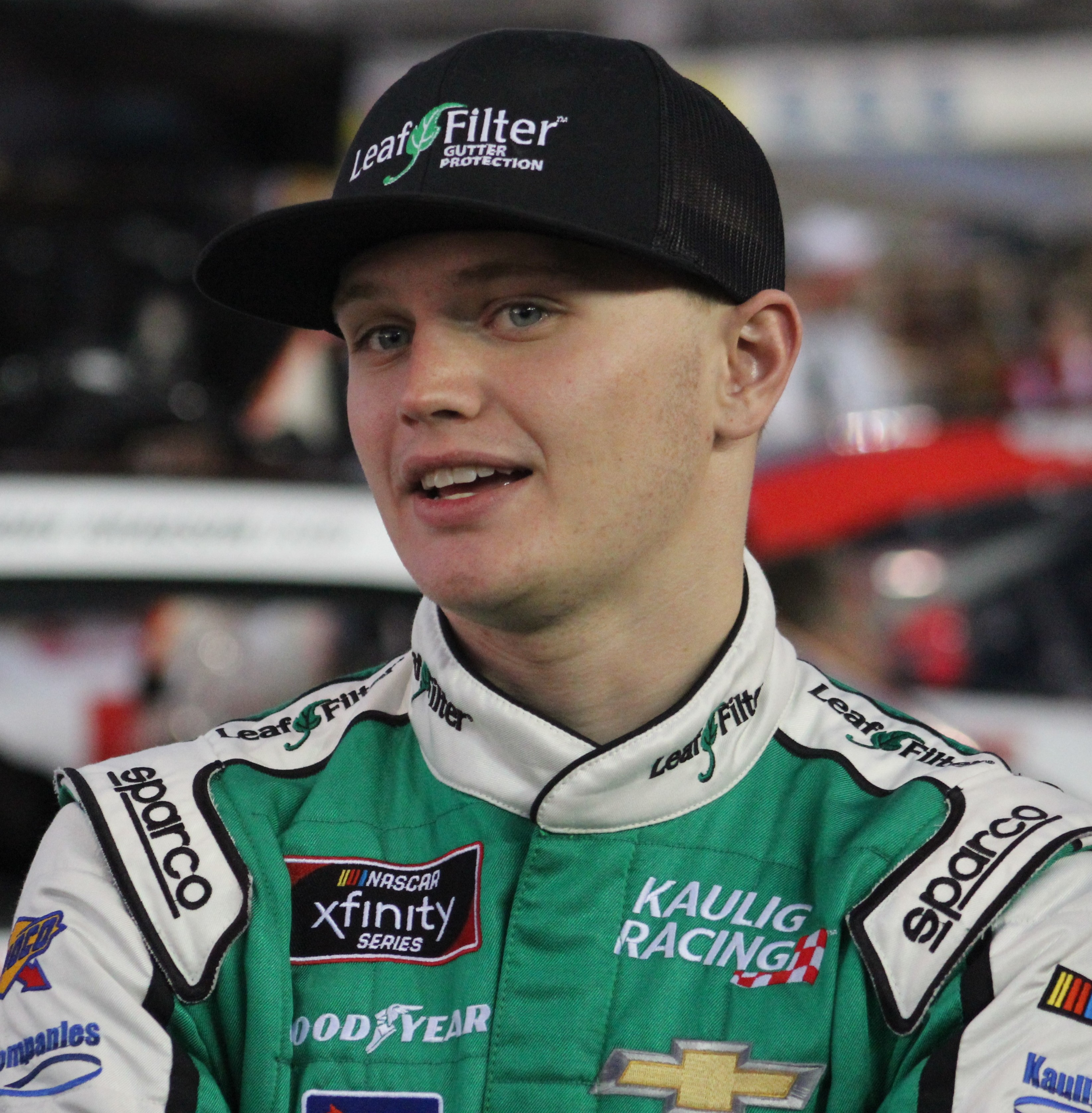
Justin Haley finished third in the championship.

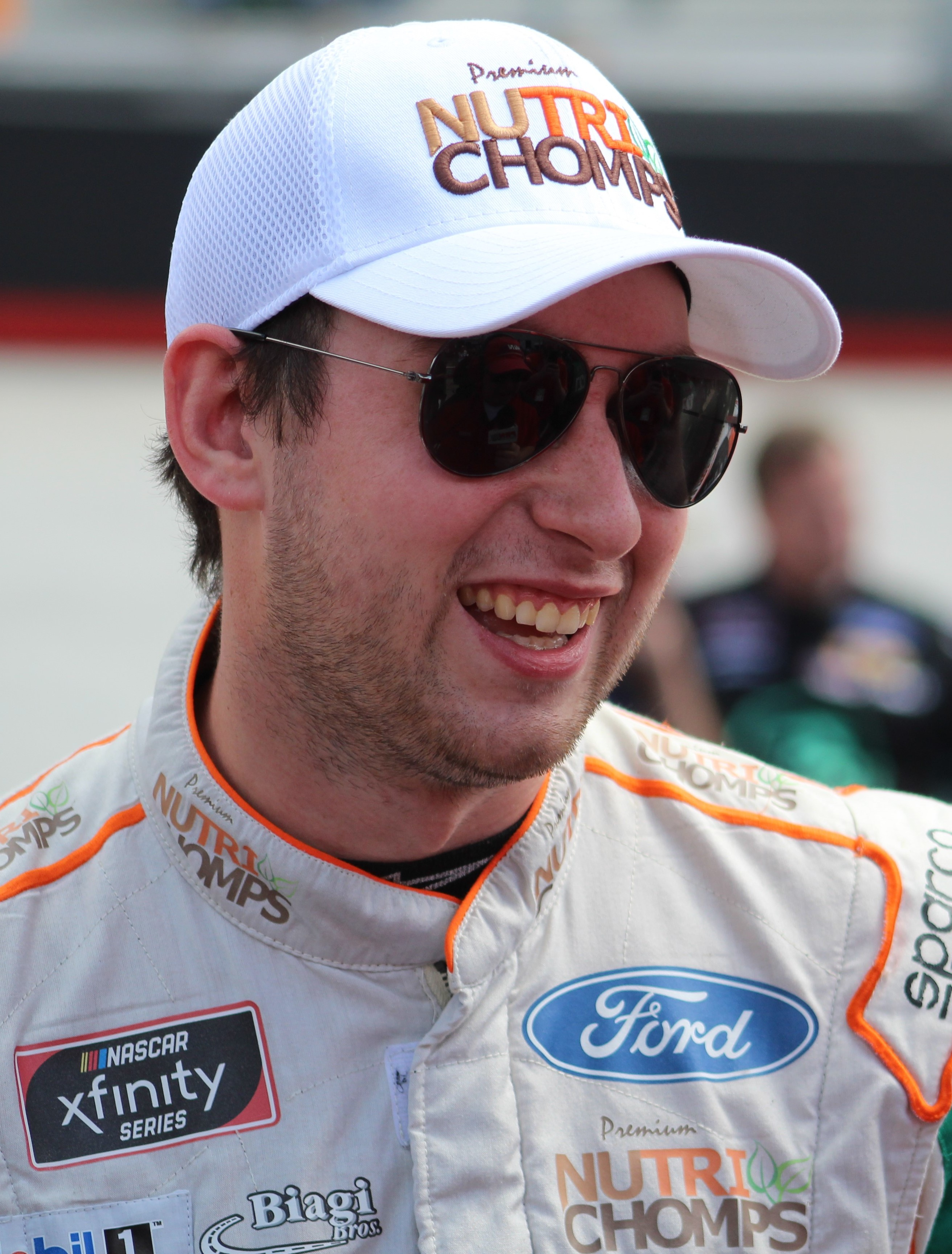
Chase Briscoe finished fourth in the championship.

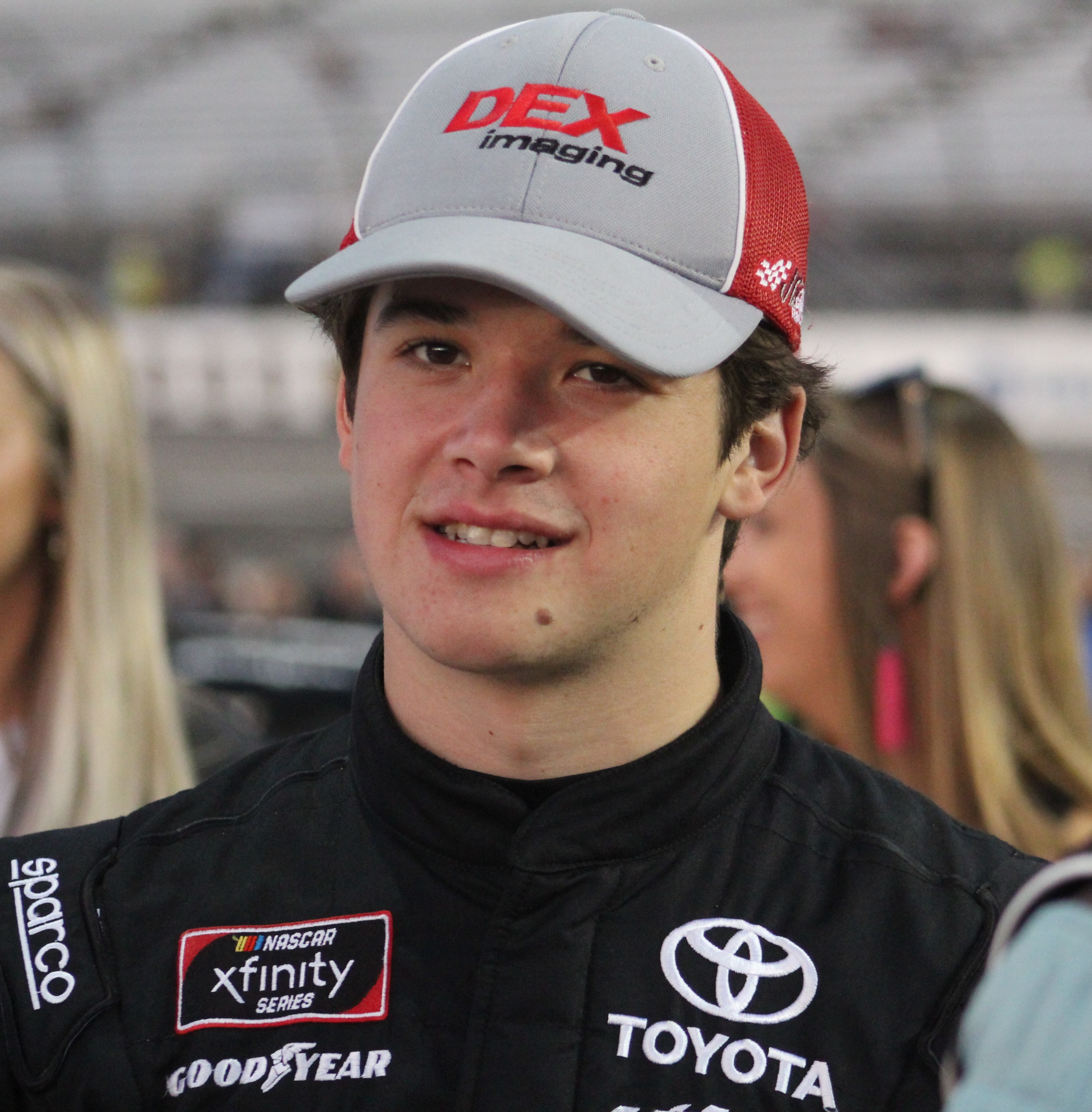
Harrison Burton won the Rookie of the Year title.

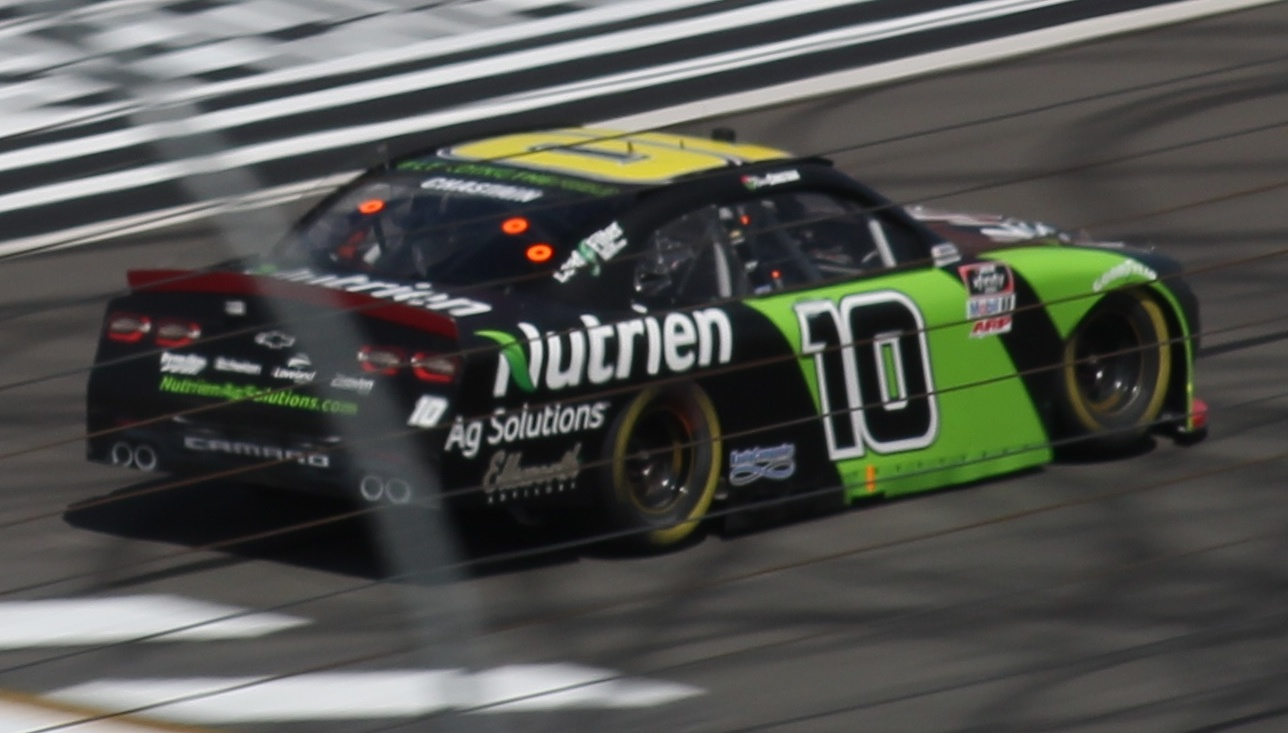
Chevrolet won the Manufacturer's championship with 10 wins and 1190 points.

The 2020 NASCAR Xfinity Series was the 39th season of the NASCAR Xfinity Series, a stock car racing series sanctioned by NASCAR in the United States. The season began at Daytona International Speedway with the NASCAR Racing Experience 300 on February 15. The regular season ended with the Go Bowling 250 at Richmond Raceway on September 11. The NASCAR playoffs ended with the Desert Diamond Casino West Valley 200 at Phoenix Raceway on November 7.

Tyler Reddick won the 2018 and 2019 championship, but did not defend his title as he moved up to the Cup Series in 2020, continuing to drive for Richard Childress Racing.

When the season was put on hold due to the COVID-19 pandemic, drivers from all NASCAR series, including many Xfinity Series drivers, participated in the inaugural eNASCAR iRacing Pro Invitational Series during that time.

Following the 2020 Virginia is for Racing Lovers 250 at Richmond Raceway, Austin Cindric clinched the Regular Season Championship. He went on to become the 2020 Xfinity Series Champion after winning the season-ending race at Phoenix. In addition, Team Penske claimed its sixth Owners' Championship, Chevrolet won the Manufacturer's Championship, and Harrison Burton took the NASCAR Rookie of the Year honors.

== Teams and drivers ==
=== Complete schedule ===
Manufacturer	Team	No.	Race driver	Crew chief
Chevrolet	Brandonbilt Motorsports	68	Brandon Brown	Doug Randolph
Chevrolet	DGM Racing	90	Caesar Bacarella 6	Mario Gosselin 16; Adam Brenner 2 Nathan Kennedy 5 B. J. Tucker 4 Kevin Boykin 1 Tony Furr 1 Ryan London 2 Chuck Efaw II 1 Shannon Rursch 1
Chevrolet	DGM Racing	90	Alex Labbé 12 (Note: Labbe ran the full season for DGM Racing split between the Nos. 36 and 90.)	Mario Gosselin 16; Adam Brenner 2 Nathan Kennedy 5 B. J. Tucker 4 Kevin Boykin 1 Tony Furr 1 Ryan London 2 Chuck Efaw II 1 Shannon Rursch 1
Chevrolet	DGM Racing	90	Dillon Bassett 2	Mario Gosselin 16; Adam Brenner 2 Nathan Kennedy 5 B. J. Tucker 4 Kevin Boykin 1 Tony Furr 1 Ryan London 2 Chuck Efaw II 1 Shannon Rursch 1
Chevrolet	DGM Racing	90	Ronnie Bassett Jr. 3	Mario Gosselin 16; Adam Brenner 2 Nathan Kennedy 5 B. J. Tucker 4 Kevin Boykin 1 Tony Furr 1 Ryan London 2 Chuck Efaw II 1 Shannon Rursch 1
Chevrolet	DGM Racing	90	Dexter Bean 6	Mario Gosselin 16; Adam Brenner 2 Nathan Kennedy 5 B. J. Tucker 4 Kevin Boykin 1 Tony Furr 1 Ryan London 2 Chuck Efaw II 1 Shannon Rursch 1
Chevrolet	DGM Racing	90	Preston Pardus 1	Mario Gosselin 16; Adam Brenner 2 Nathan Kennedy 5 B. J. Tucker 4 Kevin Boykin 1 Tony Furr 1 Ryan London 2 Chuck Efaw II 1 Shannon Rursch 1
Chevrolet	DGM Racing	90	B. J. McLeod 1	Mario Gosselin 16; Adam Brenner 2 Nathan Kennedy 5 B. J. Tucker 4 Kevin Boykin 1 Tony Furr 1 Ryan London 2 Chuck Efaw II 1 Shannon Rursch 1
Chevrolet	DGM Racing	90	Donald Theetge 2	Mario Gosselin 16; Adam Brenner 2 Nathan Kennedy 5 B. J. Tucker 4 Kevin Boykin 1 Tony Furr 1 Ryan London 2 Chuck Efaw II 1 Shannon Rursch 1
Chevrolet	DGM Racing	92	Josh Williams	Adam Brenner 3 Mario Gosselin 1 Shannon Rursch 7 B. J. Tucker 2 Ryan London 13; Nathan Kennedy 1 Danny Gill 1 Tony Furr 1 John Holmes 3 Mike Hillman Sr. 1
Chevrolet	JD Motorsports	0	B. J. McLeod 4	Wayne Carroll Jr.
Chevrolet	JD Motorsports	0	Jeffrey Earnhardt 26	Kase Kallenbach
Chevrolet	JD Motorsports	0	Mike Wallace 3	Mark Setzer
Chevrolet	JD Motorsports	4	Jesse Little (R) 31 (Note: Little ran the full season for JD Motorsports split between the Nos. 4 and 15.)	Bryan Berry 29; Wayne Carroll Jr. 4
Chevrolet	JD Motorsports	4	B. J. McLeod 2	Bryan Berry 29; Wayne Carroll Jr. 4
Chevrolet	JD Motorsports	6	David Starr 4	Kase Kallenbach
Chevrolet	JD Motorsports	6	B. J. McLeod 21	Wayne Carroll Jr. 24; Mark Setzer 2 Bryan Berry 3
Chevrolet	JD Motorsports	6	Jade Buford 1	Wayne Carroll Jr. 24; Mark Setzer 2 Bryan Berry 3
Chevrolet	JD Motorsports	6	Ryan Vargas 7	Wayne Carroll Jr. 24; Mark Setzer 2 Bryan Berry 3
Chevrolet	JD Motorsports	15	Robby Lyons 4	Mark Setzer 28; Kase Kallenbach 3 Wayne Carroll Jr. 1 Bryan Berry 1
Chevrolet	JD Motorsports	15	Colby Howard 22	Mark Setzer 28; Kase Kallenbach 3 Wayne Carroll Jr. 1 Bryan Berry 1
Chevrolet	JD Motorsports	15	Ryan Vargas 2	Mark Setzer 28; Kase Kallenbach 3 Wayne Carroll Jr. 1 Bryan Berry 1
Chevrolet	JD Motorsports	15	Jeffrey Earnhardt 3	Mark Setzer 28; Kase Kallenbach 3 Wayne Carroll Jr. 1 Bryan Berry 1
Chevrolet	JD Motorsports	15	Jesse Little (R) 2	Mark Setzer 28; Kase Kallenbach 3 Wayne Carroll Jr. 1 Bryan Berry 1
Chevrolet	Jeremy Clements Racing	51	Jeremy Clements	Andrew Abbott
Chevrolet	Jimmy Means Racing	52	J. J. Yeley 3	Tim Brown
Chevrolet	Jimmy Means Racing	52	Kody Vanderwal (R) 30	Tim Brown
Chevrolet	JR Motorsports	1	Michael Annett	Travis Mack
Chevrolet	JR Motorsports	7	Justin Allgaier	Jason Burdett
Chevrolet	JR Motorsports	8	Jeb Burton 11	Taylor Moyer
Chevrolet	JR Motorsports	8	Daniel Hemric 21	Taylor Moyer
Chevrolet	JR Motorsports	8	Dale Earnhardt Jr. 1	Taylor Moyer
Chevrolet	JR Motorsports	9	Noah Gragson	Dave Elenz
Chevrolet	Kaulig Racing	10	Ross Chastain	Bruce Schlicker
Chevrolet	Kaulig Racing	11	Justin Haley	Alex Yontz
Chevrolet	Martins Motorsports	44	Tommy Joe Martins	Danny Johnson 16; Kevyn Rebolledo 1 Buddy Sisco 14; Frank Kerr 2
Chevrolet	Mike Harmon Racing	47	Joe Nemechek 8	Ed Jewett 31; Michael Akers 2
Chevrolet	Mike Harmon Racing	47	Bayley Currey (R) 1	Ed Jewett 31; Michael Akers 2
Chevrolet	Mike Harmon Racing	47	Kyle Weatherman 21	Ed Jewett 31; Michael Akers 2
Chevrolet	Mike Harmon Racing	47	Tim Viens 2	Ed Jewett 31; Michael Akers 2
Chevrolet	Mike Harmon Racing	47	Josh Reaume 1	Ed Jewett 31; Michael Akers 2
Chevrolet	Mike Harmon Racing	74	Mike Harmon 4	Teddy Brown 11; Bruce Cook 5 Michael Akers 7 Alan Collins Jr. 4 Bayley Currey 1 Andrew Jones 2 Patrick Drake 3
Chevrolet	Mike Harmon Racing	74	Kyle Weatherman 2	Teddy Brown 11; Bruce Cook 5 Michael Akers 7 Alan Collins Jr. 4 Bayley Currey 1 Andrew Jones 2 Patrick Drake 3
Chevrolet	Mike Harmon Racing	74	Bayley Currey 25	Teddy Brown 11; Bruce Cook 5 Michael Akers 7 Alan Collins Jr. 4 Bayley Currey 1 Andrew Jones 2 Patrick Drake 3
Chevrolet	Mike Harmon Racing	74	Gray Gaulding 1	Teddy Brown 11; Bruce Cook 5 Michael Akers 7 Alan Collins Jr. 4 Bayley Currey 1 Andrew Jones 2 Patrick Drake 3
Chevrolet	Our Motorsports	02	Brett Moffitt 29	Joe Williams Jr.
Chevrolet	Our Motorsports	02	Patrick Emerling 1	Joe Williams Jr.
Chevrolet	Our Motorsports	02	Jairo Avila Jr. 1 (Note: Brett Moffitt was scheduled to run both Homestead-Miami races. However, after Moffitt crashed his only car of the weekend in the first race, the team did not have a backup car and his team cut a deal with B. J. McLeod Motorsports (BJMM) to use one of their backup cars. As part of that deal, Moffitt was replaced by BJMM driver Jairo Avila Jr. in the second race.)	Joe Williams Jr.
Chevrolet	Our Motorsports	02	Andy Lally 2	Joe Williams Jr.
Chevrolet	Richard Childress Racing	21	Myatt Snider (R) 8 (Note: Snider ran the full season split between Richard Childress Racing's No. 21 and RSS Racing's No. 93.)	Andy Street
Chevrolet	Richard Childress Racing	21	Anthony Alfredo 19	Andy Street
Chevrolet	Richard Childress Racing	21	Kaz Grala 5	Andy Street
Chevrolet	Richard Childress Racing	21	Earl Bamber 1	Andy Street
Chevrolet	RSS Racing (Note: No. 93 entries after Pocono were fielded in a collaboration with Reaume Brothers Racing.)	39	Ryan Sieg	Kevin Starland
Chevrolet	RSS Racing	93	C. J. McLaughlin 2	Kevyn Rebolledo 4 Jeff Green 26 (Note: Although Kevyn Rebolledo was listed as the crew chief for the No. 93 on the entry list for the race at Fontana, Adam Alexander stated during the broadcast of qualifying for that race that Jeff Green was the car's crew chief instead.); Kyle Louchart 2 Kevin Johnson 1
Chevrolet	RSS Racing	93	Joey Gase 1 (Note: Entry was fielded in a collaboration with Rick Ware Racing.)	Kevyn Rebolledo 4 Jeff Green 26; Kyle Louchart 2 Kevin Johnson 1
Chevrolet	RSS Racing	93	Myatt Snider (R) 25	Kevyn Rebolledo 4 Jeff Green 26; Kyle Louchart 2 Kevin Johnson 1
Chevrolet	RSS Racing	93	Jeff Green 4	Kevyn Rebolledo 4 Jeff Green 26; Kyle Louchart 2 Kevin Johnson 1
Chevrolet	RSS Racing	93	Josh Reaume 1	Kevyn Rebolledo 4 Jeff Green 26; Kyle Louchart 2 Kevin Johnson 1
Chevrolet	SS-Green Light Racing (Note: No. 07 entries after Darlington 1 (Race 5) were fielded in a collaboration with Rick Ware Racing.)	07	Ray Black Jr. 5	Jason Miller
Chevrolet	SS-Green Light Racing	07	Garrett Smithley 5	Jason Miller
Chevrolet	SS-Green Light Racing	07	Carson Ware 3	Jason Miller
Chevrolet	SS-Green Light Racing	07	J. J. Yeley 1	Jason Miller
Chevrolet	SS-Green Light Racing	07	Gray Gaulding 5	Jason Miller
Chevrolet	SS-Green Light Racing	07	Jade Buford 3	Jason Miller
Chevrolet	SS-Green Light Racing	07	David Starr 8	Jason Miller
Chevrolet	SS-Green Light Racing	07	R. C. Enerson 1	Jason Miller
Chevrolet	SS-Green Light Racing	07	Joey Gase 2	Jason Miller
Chevrolet	SS-Green Light Racing	08	Joe Graf Jr. (R)	Patrick Donahue
Ford	Stewart–Haas Racing	98	Chase Briscoe	Richard Boswell 29; Greg Zipadelli 4
Ford	Team Penske	22	Austin Cindric	Brian Wilson
Toyota	Hattori Racing Enterprises (Note: Shigeaki Hattori is the listed owner of the No. 61 in each race, although the team only fields the car when Austin Hill is the driver. MBM Motorsports fields it in all other races using Hattori's owner points and car number.)	61	Austin Hill 9	Dan Stillman 3 Doug Richert 3 Patrick Magee 14; Ryan Bell 7 Scott Zipadelli 5
Toyota	Hattori Racing Enterprises	61	Timmy Hill 14	Dan Stillman 3 Doug Richert 3 Patrick Magee 14; Ryan Bell 7 Scott Zipadelli 5
Toyota	Hattori Racing Enterprises	61	Stephen Leicht 5	Dan Stillman 3 Doug Richert 3 Patrick Magee 14; Ryan Bell 7 Scott Zipadelli 5
Toyota	Hattori Racing Enterprises	61	Chad Finchum 4	Dan Stillman 3 Doug Richert 3 Patrick Magee 14; Ryan Bell 7 Scott Zipadelli 5
Toyota	Hattori Racing Enterprises	61	J. J. Yeley 1	Clinton Cram
Toyota	Joe Gibbs Racing	18	Riley Herbst (R)	Dave Rogers
Toyota	Joe Gibbs Racing	19	Brandon Jones	Jeff Meendering
Toyota	Joe Gibbs Racing	20	Harrison Burton (R)	Ben Beshore 32; Dustin Zacharyasz 1
Toyota	MBM Motorsports	13	Chad Finchum 21	Ryan Bell 20; Patrick Magee 13
Toyota	MBM Motorsports	13	Timmy Hill 7	Ryan Bell 20; Patrick Magee 13
Toyota	MBM Motorsports	13	Jesse Iwuji 1	Ryan Bell 20; Patrick Magee 13
Toyota	MBM Motorsports	13	Bobby Reuse 1 (Note: Entry was fielded in a collaboration with Jordan Anderson Racing.)	Ryan Bell 20; Patrick Magee 13
Toyota	MBM Motorsports	13	Stephen Leicht 3	Ryan Bell 20; Patrick Magee 13
Toyota	MBM Motorsports	66	Timmy Hill 8	Tim Goulet 20; Patrick Magee 2 Keith Parson 1 Clinton Cram 6 Michael Morawski 2 Ryan Bell 2
Toyota	MBM Motorsports	66	Stephen Leicht 16	Tim Goulet 20; Patrick Magee 2 Keith Parson 1 Clinton Cram 6 Michael Morawski 2 Ryan Bell 2
Toyota	MBM Motorsports	66	John Jackson 2	Tim Goulet 20; Patrick Magee 2 Keith Parson 1 Clinton Cram 6 Michael Morawski 2 Ryan Bell 2
Toyota	MBM Motorsports	66	Chad Finchum 4	Tim Goulet 20; Patrick Magee 2 Keith Parson 1 Clinton Cram 6 Michael Morawski 2 Ryan Bell 2
Toyota	MBM Motorsports	66	Harold Crooms 1	Tim Goulet 20; Patrick Magee 2 Keith Parson 1 Clinton Cram 6 Michael Morawski 2 Ryan Bell 2
Toyota	MBM Motorsports	66	Carl Long 1	Tim Goulet 20; Patrick Magee 2 Keith Parson 1 Clinton Cram 6 Michael Morawski 2 Ryan Bell 2
Toyota	MBM Motorsports	66	Stan Mullis 1	Tim Goulet 20; Patrick Magee 2 Keith Parson 1 Clinton Cram 6 Michael Morawski 2 Ryan Bell 2
Toyota 12 Chevrolet 21	B. J. McLeod Motorsports	5	Matt Mills 31	George Ingram 32; Keith Wolfe 1
Toyota 12 Chevrolet 21	B. J. McLeod Motorsports	5	Vinnie Miller 2	George Ingram 32; Keith Wolfe 1
Toyota 13 Chevrolet 20	B. J. McLeod Motorsports	78	Vinnie Miller 22	Keith Wolfe 24; Adam Brooks 8
Toyota 13 Chevrolet 20	B. J. McLeod Motorsports	78	Scott Heckert 2	Keith Wolfe 24; Adam Brooks 8
Toyota 13 Chevrolet 20	B. J. McLeod Motorsports	78	B. J. McLeod 3	Keith Wolfe 24; Adam Brooks 8
Toyota 13 Chevrolet 20	B. J. McLeod Motorsports	78	Mason Massey 2	Keith Wolfe 24; Adam Brooks 8
Toyota 13 Chevrolet 20	B. J. McLeod Motorsports	78	Stefan Parsons 2	Keith Wolfe 24; Adam Brooks 8
Toyota 13 Chevrolet 20	B. J. McLeod Motorsports	78	Josh Bilicki 1	Keith Wolfe 24; Adam Brooks 8
Toyota 13 Chevrolet 20	B. J. McLeod Motorsports	78	C. J. McLaughlin 1	Keith Wolfe 24; Adam Brooks 8
Toyota 23 Chevrolet 10	B. J. McLeod Motorsports	99	Josh Bilicki 6	Adam Brooks 24; George Ingram 1 Keith Wolfe 7
Toyota 23 Chevrolet 10	B. J. McLeod Motorsports	99	Mason Massey 8	Adam Brooks 24; George Ingram 1 Keith Wolfe 7
Toyota 23 Chevrolet 10	B. J. McLeod Motorsports	99	J. J. Yeley 1	Adam Brooks 24; George Ingram 1 Keith Wolfe 7
Toyota 23 Chevrolet 10	B. J. McLeod Motorsports	99	Stefan Parsons 7	Adam Brooks 24; George Ingram 1 Keith Wolfe 7
Toyota 23 Chevrolet 10	B. J. McLeod Motorsports	99	Jairo Avila Jr. 1	Adam Brooks 24; George Ingram 1 Keith Wolfe 7
Toyota 23 Chevrolet 10	B. J. McLeod Motorsports	99	Joey Gase 1	Adam Brooks 24; George Ingram 1 Keith Wolfe 7
Toyota 23 Chevrolet 10	B. J. McLeod Motorsports	99	Matt Mills 1	Adam Brooks 24; George Ingram 1 Keith Wolfe 7
Toyota 23 Chevrolet 10	B. J. McLeod Motorsports	99	Vinnie Miller 4	Adam Brooks 24; George Ingram 1 Keith Wolfe 7
Toyota 23 Chevrolet 10	B. J. McLeod Motorsports	99	C. J. McLaughlin 1	Adam Brooks 24; George Ingram 1 Keith Wolfe 7
Toyota 23 Chevrolet 10	B. J. McLeod Motorsports	99	Jesse Iwuji 3	Adam Brooks 24; George Ingram 1 Keith Wolfe 7

=== Limited schedule ===
Manufacturer	Team	No.	Race driver	Crew chief	Rounds
Chevrolet	ACG Motorsports	25	Chris Cockrum	Jeff Spraker	1
Chevrolet	DGM Racing	36	Alex Labbé	Nathan Kennedy 5 Mario Gosselin 16; Shannon Rursch 4 Tony Furr 3 Danny Gill 3	21
Chevrolet	DGM Racing	36	Ronnie Bassett Jr.	Nathan Kennedy 5 Mario Gosselin 16; Shannon Rursch 4 Tony Furr 3 Danny Gill 3	2
Chevrolet	DGM Racing	36	Dexter Bean	Nathan Kennedy 5 Mario Gosselin 16; Shannon Rursch 4 Tony Furr 3 Danny Gill 3	3
Chevrolet	DGM Racing	36	Preston Pardus	Nathan Kennedy 5 Mario Gosselin 16; Shannon Rursch 4 Tony Furr 3 Danny Gill 3	3
Chevrolet	DGM Racing	36	Korbin Forrister (Note: Entry was fielded in a collaboration with All Out Motorsports.)	Nathan Kennedy 5 Mario Gosselin 16; Shannon Rursch 4 Tony Furr 3 Danny Gill 3	2
Chevrolet	Kaulig Racing	16	A. J. Allmendinger	Lennie Chandler 1 Justin Cox 9 Chris Rice 2 (Note: At Atlanta, when the team won the race, as well as Road America, Cox was listed on the entry list as crew chief, but as shown on the TV broadcast, Kaulig Team President Chris Rice was the actual crew chief.)	12
Chevrolet	RSS Racing	38	Jeff Green	Clifford Turner	2
Chevrolet	RSS Racing	38	Ross Chastain (Note: Jeff Green qualified the car at Daytona in February, but after Chastain failed to qualify for the race in his own No. 10 car, he replaced Jeff Green in the No. 38.)	Bruce Schlicker (Note: Schlicker, Chastain's crew chief on the No. 10 car, moved over with him to the No. 38 after Chastain's DNQ in the No. 10, replacing Clifford Turner as the No. 38 crew chief.)	1
Chevrolet	Shepherd Racing Ventures	89	Landon Cassill	Philip Morgan	4
Ford	Rick Ware Racing	17	Cody Ware	Mike Hillman Sr.	1
Ford	Rick Ware Racing	17	J. J. Yeley	Ken Evans	1
Ford	Team Penske	12	Brad Keselowski	Matt Swiderski	1
Toyota	Joe Gibbs Racing	54	Kyle Busch	Jacob Canter	5
Toyota	Joe Gibbs Racing	54	Denny Hamlin	Jacob Canter	1
Toyota	Sam Hunt Racing	26	Colin Garrett	Brian Keselowski 1 Bryan Smith 7	6
Toyota	Sam Hunt Racing	26	Brandon Gdovic	Brian Keselowski 1 Bryan Smith 7	2
Toyota	Sam Hunt Racing	26	Mason Diaz	Eddie Troconis	2

=== Changes ===
==== Teams ====
- On September 9, 2019, it was reported that GMS Racing was considering shutting down their No. 23 Xfinity team in 2020 if additional sponsorship couldn't be found, although the team would continue to compete in the Truck Series. This was officially announced on November 21, 2019. The team's assets and owner points would be purchased by the new Our Motorsports No. 02 team.
- On October 28, 2019, ARCA Menards Series East team owner Sam Hunt announced that his Sam Hunt Racing team would move up to the Xfinity Series in 2020, with their East Series driver Colin Garrett also racing for the team in Xfinity. The team initially announced that they would run five races, and any additional races they would run depended on how much sponsorship the team's crowdfunding model would generate.
- On October 30, 2019, it was announced that Our Motorsports, a part-time ARCA Menards Series team which also formerly competed in the NASCAR Whelen Modified Tour, would compete full-time in the Xfinity Series in 2020 after buying cars and equipment from the GMS Racing No. 23 team, which closed down after the 2019 season. The team's No. 02 car would be driven by multiple drivers, including team co-owner Andy Seuss and later GMS Truck Series driver Brett Moffitt.
- On December 8, 2019, MBM Motorsports driver Tommy Joe Martins posted a video to his Twitter saying that he would not be back with the team in 2020 because they would likely be reducing from four full-time cars to two. Team owner Carl Long confirmed this news on December 19, 2019.
- On December 24, 2019, it was announced that Martins Motorsports, owned by driver Tommy Joe Martins and his father Craig, would be re-opening in 2020. They will field a full-time Xfinity Series team in 2020, the No. 44 Chevrolet, with Tommy Joe driving in all races unless other drivers who bring sponsorship are found which would take him out of the driver's seat at any time. Also, unlike when the team last competed, they will have another owner, Rodney Riessen, a longtime friend of the Martins family.
- On January 15, 2020, DGM Racing announced that their No. 36 team would be renumbered to the No. 92 in 2020, which was previously the number for their third part-time team. Josh Williams will continue as the driver of that car for the second year in a row. In a number swap between DGM cars, the old No. 92 car will now have the No. 36, and Alex Labbé will drive it in at least three races, one of which is the season-opener at Daytona. It could even turn into a full-season effort if sponsorship is found.
- On January 19, 2020, Mike Harmon Racing announced that they would be renumbering their second car, the No. 17, to the No. 47 (which is the No. 74, the number of their primary car, backwards) for this season. Harmon took over the No. 17 in large part from Rick Ware Racing partway through the 2019 season.
- On January 21, 2020, RSS Racing revealed that they would only be fielding two cars full-time, the No. 39 and the No. 93, with the No. 38, which was previously for the most part a start and park car, going down to part-time for 2020. The No. 38 will be entered at Daytona and Talladega with Jeff Green, and will only be fielded in other races if sponsorship is found.
- On February 3, 2020, Bob Pockrass reported the following owner points transfers for 2020: GMS Racing No. 23 to the Our Motorsports No. 02, Stewart–Haas Racing with Biagi-DenBeste No. 98 to Jimmy Means Racing No. 52, MBM Motorsports No. 61 to the Hattori Racing Enterprises No. 61, Jimmy Means Racing No. 52 to the Mike Harmon Racing No. 74. Internal owners points transfers consist of the following: Stewart–Haas Racing with Biagi-DenBeste No. 00 to No. 98, DGM Racing No. 92 to No. 36, RSS Racing No. 93 to No. 39, MBM Motorsports No. 35 to No. 66 and No. 66 to No. 13, Brandonbilt Motorsports No. 86 to 68, B. J. McLeod Motorsports No. 99 to No. 78, and JD Motorsports No. 01 to No. 6, No. 0 to No. 4, No. 15 to No. 0, and No. 4 to No. 15.
- On May 23, 2020, Ray Black Jr. announced that he would no longer be driving the No. 07 for SS-Green Light Racing in order to concentrate on helping his family business, the CDA Technical Institute, recover after it experienced financial problems due to the COVID-19 pandemic. After Black's departure, it was announced that Rick Ware Racing had cut a deal with SS-Green Light to field some of their drivers in the No. 07 for the remainder of the season. This began with Garrett Smithley in the car for Charlotte and Carson Ware, Rick's son, making his series debut at Bristol.

==== Drivers ====
- On September 24, 2019, it was announced that Christopher Bell will move up to the NASCAR Cup Series for 2020, driving the No. 95 for Leavine Family Racing and vacating his No. 20 Joe Gibbs Racing Toyota in the Xfinity Series.
- On October 2, 2019, it was confirmed by Richard Childress Racing that Tyler Reddick will be moving up to the Cup Series with them full-time in 2020, replacing Daniel Hemric in the No. 8 Chevrolet.
- On October 15, 2019, it was announced that Ross Chastain will be driving for Kaulig Racing full-time in 2020 in their No. 10 car after running part-time for the team in 2019. In that announcement, the team also confirmed that Justin Haley would be returning to drive the No. 11.
- On October 17, 2019, it was announced that Harrison Burton would be driving for Joe Gibbs Racing full-time in 2020 in their No. 20 Toyota, replacing Christopher Bell while also competing for Rookie of the Year honors. In 2019, Burton drove full-time in the Truck Series driving the No. 18 Toyota Tundra for Kyle Busch Motorsports while also making some limited starts in the Xfinity Series, driving the No. 18 Toyota for Gibbs.
- On October 18, 2019, Kaulig Racing president Chris Rice announced that the team intended on fielding their No. 16 car part-time in 2020, with the tentative plan being for A. J. Allmendinger to return for all the road course races plus the new Martinsville race in October. Rice also stated they will field the car at the restrictor plate races, but they have not yet decided on a driver. On December 30, 2019, Rice confirmed in an interview with Larry McReynolds on Sirius XM NASCAR Radio that Allmendinger would drive the No. 16 at Daytona in February. On January 30, 2020, Kaulig Racing announced that Allmendinger would run for a total of eight races, which were all five road course events and all three restrictor plate races. Allmendinger would later add the spring Bristol race and Atlanta to his schedule as well. After winning the race at Atlanta, the Sunday Homestead race was also added to his schedule so he could run for the Dash 4 Cash.
- On November 5, 2019, it was announced that Riley Herbst will drive the No. 18 Toyota full-time for Joe Gibbs Racing in 2020.
- On November 7, 2019, it was announced that Jesse Little will drive for JD Motorsports full-time in 2020.
- On November 13, 2019, it was announced that Daniel Hemric will return to the Xfinity Series to drive the JR Motorsports No. 8 Chevrolet for 21 races. In addition, Jeb Burton will drive the car for 11 races and team co-owner Dale Earnhardt Jr. will return for one race.
- On November 21, 2019, it was announced that Myatt Snider will run part-time for Richard Childress Racing in 2020, beginning at the season-opening race at Daytona International Speedway.
- On November 22, 2019, it was announced that C. J. McLaughlin will return to RSS Racing for at least 20 races in 2020.
- On December 3, 2019, it was announced that Anthony Alfredo would run a part-time Xfinity schedule for Richard Childress Racing in the same car as Myatt Snider, which was confirmed to be the No. 21 again in 2020. Last year, Alfredo drove for DGR-Crosley part-time in the Truck Series.
- On December 4, 2019, Landon Cassill said that he plans to race full-time in the Shepherd Racing Ventures No. 89 Chevrolet in 2020, should funding be available. He drove that car part-time in 2019 as well as for the last race of the 2018 season.
- On December 6, 2019, Richard Childress Racing publicly stated that they would be interested in hiring Daniel Suárez either to drive the No. 2 Chevrolet or if sponsorship was found, for a third Cup team in 2020. Suárez previously drove for Joe Gibbs Racing from 2015 to 2018 (with the last two years being in the Cup Series) and for Stewart–Haas Racing in 2019.
- On December 8, 2019, Tommy Joe Martins announced via Twitter that he would likely be let go by MBM Motorsports in 2020. He had previously signed with the team in Summer 2019 to return for this year, but that has changed since the team now looks to scale back to two cars. On December 24, it was announced that Martins will drive the No. 44 Chevrolet of the returning Martins Motorsports in 2020.
- On December 19, 2019, Carl Long said that Joey Gase would not be back with his team in 2020 as part of their reduction from four full-time teams to two. The following day, Gase was announced to be moving up to the Cup Series full-time driving for Rick Ware Racing.
- On January 9, 2020, JD Motorsports announced that Colby Howard will be joining the team for the majority of the season starting at Phoenix.
- On January 14, 2020, RSS Racing announced the return of Jeff Green in the No. 38 Chevrolet. He is back after sitting out for the second half of the 2019 season due to having surgery. The team had previously stated before this happened that they wanted to have him back in 2020 if he was medically cleared to race.
- On January 16, 2020, it was announced that Joe Graf Jr. will race full-time in the SS-Green Light Racing No. 08 Chevrolet.
- On January 22, 2020, MBM Motorsports announced that Stephen Leicht would be joining the team to drive the No. 13 in a few races, the first of which will be at Las Vegas. In other races where he is not driving, such as at Daytona, he will be a spotter for one of the team's other cars. In 2019, Leicht ran a full season in the Xfinity Series in the No. 01 for JD Motorsports.
- On January 28, 2020, it was announced that Mason Massey would drive the No. 99 for B. J. McLeod Motorsports in a number of races in the 2020 season, starting at Las Vegas Motor Speedway in February.
- On January 28, 2020, Chris Cockrum announced he would run at least three races in the ACG Motorsports No. 25 Chevrolet.
- On January 30, 2020, Our Motorsports announced that Brett Moffitt would drive the No. 02 Chevrolet for the first four races in the season. Moffitt also ended up driving the fifth race of the season at Darlington on top of the first four races. Patrick Emerling was announced on May 20, 2020, to be making his debut in the series in the No. 02 at Bristol in May.
- On February 7, 2020, JD Motorsports announced that Jeffrey Earnhardt would rejoin the team to drive in twelve races in 2020. He drove the No. 4 car full-time in 2014. For about half of 2019, Earnhardt was without a ride after being released from his part-time rides with Joe Gibbs Racing and XCI Racing.
- On February 11, 2020, Jimmy Means Racing announced that J. J. Yeley will drive the No. 52 Chevrolet in the first three races of the season.
- On February 20, 2020, Joe Gibbs Racing announced that Kyle Busch will drive the No. 54 Toyota at Phoenix, Charlotte, Chicagoland, Loudon and Watkins Glen.
- On March 4, 2020, Tony Stewart announced that he would come out of retirement and race at the Indianapolis road course race on the July 4th weekend. This is his first Xfinity start since 2013 at Daytona, a race that he won. It is also his first race in the series at a track other than Daytona since 2009. However, reporter Jenna Fryer tweeted on June 9, 2020, that Stewart had decided to not enter the race after it was announced that no fans would be allowed to attend it due to COVID-19.
- On April 14, 2020, JD Motorsports announced that Mike Wallace, who drove for them from 2009 through 2013, would reunite with the team to drive the No. 0 car at the Indianapolis road course. This will be his first NASCAR and Xfinity Series start since 2015 following an unofficial retirement. On September 10, NASCAR suspended Wallace indefinitely and ordered him to perform sensitivity training after he made a post on social media that violated the sport's member conduct guidelines.
- On May 18, 2020, David Starr tweeted that he has parted ways with JD Motorsports due to the COVID-19 pandemic affecting sponsorship.
- On July 22, 2020, it was announced that Andy Seuss had left Our Motorsports. He was set to make a number of starts with them in the No. 02 throughout the season, but had yet to make any at the time of his departure from the team. (After some strong runs in the car, Brett Moffitt ended up running additional races in it.) Meanwhile, hours later, it was announced that Andy Lally, would be driving for the team at Road America and the Daytona Road Course.

==== Crew chiefs ====
- Jason Ratcliff moved up to the No. 95 Leavine Family Racing entry in the NASCAR Cup Series in 2020, continuing to work with driver Christopher Bell as he takes over that ride next year, and vacated his position as crew chief of the No. 20 Joe Gibbs Racing car in the Xfinity Series.
- On November 5, 2019, Richard Childress Racing announced that Randall Burnett would be moving up from the No. 2 team to the No. 8 RCR Cup car, continuing to work with driver Tyler Reddick as he takes over that ride next year, meaning he will vacate his position as crew chief of the No. 2 NXS car in 2020.
- On November 7, 2019, Joe Gibbs Racing announced changes to their crew chief lineup for 2020 with No. 18 crew chief Ben Beshore replacing Ratcliff as crew chief of the No. 20 team (where he will work with Harrison Burton), with Dave Rogers replacing Beshore as the No. 18 crew chief (where he will work with Riley Herbst). Rogers was previously the technical director for JGR's Xfinity operations since mid-2017; it is unclear who will replace him in that position in 2020 when he returns to being a crew chief.
- On December 4, 2019, Stewart–Haas Racing announced that Mike Shiplett will move up to the No. 41 team in the NASCAR Cup Series, replacing Billy Scott and continuing to work with driver Cole Custer.
- On December 18, 2019, MBM Motorsports revealed the crew chiefs for their Xfinity Series teams in 2020, with Ryan Bell working with Timmy Hill and Daniel Johnson working with Chad Finchum. However, on January 12, 2019, Martins Motorsports announced that Johnson would be the crew chief of his No. 44 team (and therefore, departing MBM). Both Martins and Johnson were together at MBM at the end of the 2019 season.
- On January 14, 2020, RSS Racing announced that Clifford Turner would be returning to be the crew chief of their No. 38 team after being suspended in June of last year due to violating the Substance Abuse Policy. Although Turner was reinstated in September, he did not return to crew chiefing the car for the remainder of the 2019 season.
- On January 15, 2020, it was announced that Shane Wilson, who crew chiefed Ryan Sieg and his No. 39 team in 2019, leading him to having many good runs and a playoff spot, would not be back with the team because he joined DGR-Crosley to crew chief Tanner Gray and their No. 15 Truck Series team.
- On January 17, 2020, Bruce Schlicker was announced as Ross Chastain's crew chief on the Kaulig Racing No. 10 car. He previously worked as the engineer for Cole Custer and the Stewart Haas Racing with Biagi-DenBeste No. 00 team, which closed down. Prior to that, he was an engineer with Richard Childress Racing. He also has crew chief experience in 2010 with the MSRP Motorsports No. 90 car and part of 2009 with the SK Motorsports No. 07 car as well as interim crew chief for Custer's No. 00 in three races in 2018.
- On January 21, 2020, it was announced that Jeff Green would be the crew chief for RSS Racing's No. 93 team (driven by C. J. McLaughlin, Myatt Snider, Joey Gase, and other drivers to be determined) in the races where he is not driving the team's No. 38 car.
- On January 28, 2020, Richard Childress Racing announced that Andy Street has been promoted to crew chief of the No. 21 Chevrolet.
- On June 13, 2020, following the Hooters 250 at Homestead–Miami Speedway, Stewart–Haas Racing No. 98 crew chief Richard Boswell, car chief Nick Hutchins, and engineer D. J. Vanderley were suspended for four races after a tungsten ballast came loose and fell off the frame rail of the car during the start of the race. SHR executive Greg Zipadelli stepped in as the No. 98's crew chief at the Contender Boats 250.
- On June 26, 2020, Mike Harmon Racing No. 74 crew chief Teddy Brown was suspended indefinitely following his June 8 arrest in Iredell County, North Carolina for habitual misdemeanor assault.

==== Sponsorship restrictions ====
- On December 2, 2019, NASCAR announced that the organization will not allow CBD sponsorships partly due to restrictions from its media rights partners and also because of FIA regulations (cannabinoids, which CBD is part, is a Prohibited Substance in the WADA Code that is used by the FIA; NASCAR is a member of the ASN of the FIA in the United States, the Automobile Competition Committee for the United States).

== Rule changes ==
- NASCAR Cup Series drivers will only be allowed to compete in five races, down from seven in 2019. Similar to 2019, Cup drivers are not allowed to compete in Dash 4 Cash as well as the final eight races of the season (the final race before the playoffs and the NASCAR playoffs). Unlike 2019, the rule now applies to drivers declaring for Cup Series points with three or more years of Cup Series experience, down from five years of experience in 2019.
- The Xfinity Series field will be reduced to 36 cars in 2020, down from 38 in 2019.
- Controlled cautions will be used at Mid-Ohio Sports Car Course, Iowa Speedway, and Road America. This procedure includes restrictions on tire changes and refueling to prevent teams from hiring specialized pit crews for standalone races. The controlled caution procedure will not be in effect for weekends where either series is with the Cup Series. The rules are as follows:

- Each team will consist of eight pit crew members. This includes four to service the car, one fueler, and one driver assistant.
- On oval tracks, teams may add fuel and change two tires per pit stop.
- On road courses, teams may add fuel or change four tires per pit stop.
- Restarts under caution will be in the following order:

1. Cars that did not pit.
2. Cars that pitted one time, followed by two times.
3. Free Pass, Wave Around vehicles, Penalty vehicles.

- Teams involved in incidents are allowed to change four tires at once to avoid damaging the vehicle.
- Penalties are as follows:

- A team must restart on the tail end of the lead lap if they exceed the time limit on pit road or they pit other than the designated lap.
- A team must serve a two-lap penalty if they change all four tires and add fuel on any pit stop, change tires under green (unless approved by NASCAR for damage caused by an incident), or perform a four-tire change on any pit stop (ovals only).

=== Changes due to the coronavirus (COVID-19) pandemic ===
In NASCAR's first races back since the pandemic hit, there would be no practice or qualifying held so that teams would not need to bring additional crew members to the track and would not need to bring backup cars. (Crew members would be in contact with each other when repairing a primary car damaged in practice or qualifying or to prepare a backup car if a team had to utilize it).

In the Xfinity Series and Gander RV & Outdoors Truck Series races that will be held without practice and qualifying, NASCAR announced that the field size temporarily will be expanded to a maximum of 40 vehicles each. The field will be set by a random draw, similar to NASCAR Cup Series.

On July 21, NASCAR announced that the remaining national series events on the 2020 schedule will be held without practice and qualifying.

== Schedule ==
NASCAR announced the 2020 Xfinity Series schedule on April 3, 2019.

Notes:

- The B&L Transport 170 at Mid-Ohio Sports Car Course will move to a May date instead of its August date in 2019. (However, this changed when the race was canceled as part of the COVID-19 schedule changes.)
- The June race at Iowa Speedway will now become a night race instead of a day race that it was in 2019. (However, this changed when the race was cancelled as part of the COVID-19 schedule changes.)
- The O'Reilly Auto Parts 300 at Texas Motor Speedway will now become a day race instead of a night race that it was in 2019.
- The new Martinsville race will be held at night. It will be the first time the series has raced there under the lights.
- The August race at Iowa and Road America was originally supposed to air on CNBC due to the 2020 Summer Olympics on NBC and NBCSN. (However, this changed as part of the COVID-19 schedule changes.)
- The Pennzoil 150 will move to the Indianapolis Motor Speedway road course and will move from NBCSN to NBC.
- The Dash 4 Cash races (listed in **bold**) are at Atlanta, Homestead race 2, Talladega and Pocono.

No.	Race title	Track	Date
1	NASCAR Racing Experience 300	Daytona International Speedway, Daytona Beach, Florida	February 15
2	Boyd Gaming 300	Las Vegas Motor Speedway, Las Vegas, Nevada	February 22–23 (Note: The February Las Vegas race was stopped at Lap 51 on Saturday, due to rain. The race was completed the following day.)
3	Production Alliance Group 300	Auto Club Speedway, Fontana, California	February 29
4	LS Tractor 200	Phoenix Raceway, Avondale, Arizona	March 7
5	Toyota 200 (Note: The additional Darlington race replaced the Chicagoland race, the Chicagoland 300.)	Darlington Raceway, Darlington, South Carolina	May 21
6	Alsco 300	Charlotte Motor Speedway, Concord, North Carolina	May 25
7	Cheddar's 300	Bristol Motor Speedway, Bristol, Tennessee	June 1
8	**EchoPark 250**	Atlanta Motor Speedway, Hampton, Georgia	June 6
9	Hooters 250	Homestead–Miami Speedway, Homestead, Florida	June 13
10	**Contender Boats 250** (Note: The additional Homestead-Miami race replaced the first race at Iowa, the CircuitCity.com 250.)	Homestead–Miami Speedway, Homestead, Florida	June 14
11	**Unhinged 300**	Talladega Superspeedway, Lincoln, Alabama	June 20
12	**Pocono Green 225**	Pocono Raceway, Long Pond, Pennsylvania	June 28
13	Pennzoil 150	Indianapolis Motor Speedway (Road Course), Speedway, Indiana	July 4
14	Shady Rays 200 (Note: The additional Kentucky race replaced New Hampshire race, the ROXOR 200.)	Kentucky Speedway, Sparta, Kentucky	July 9
15	Alsco 300	Kentucky Speedway, Sparta, Kentucky	July 10
16	My Bariatric Solutions 300	Texas Motor Speedway, Fort Worth, Texas	July 18
17	Kansas Lottery 250 (Note: The additional race at Kansas replaced the second race at Iowa, the U.S. Cellular 250.)	Kansas Speedway, Kansas City, Kansas	July 25
18	Henry 180	Road America, Elkhart Lake, Wisconsin	August 8
19	UNOH 188 (Note: The Daytona Road Course replaced the Watkins Glen race, the Zippo 200 at The Glen.)	Daytona International Speedway (Road Course), Daytona Beach, Florida	August 15
20	Drydene 200	Dover International Speedway, Dover, Delaware	August 22
21	Drydene 200	Dover International Speedway, Dover, Delaware	August 23
22	Wawa 250	Daytona International Speedway, Daytona Beach, Florida	August 28
23	Sport Clips Haircuts VFW 200	Darlington Raceway, Darlington, South Carolina	September 5
24	Go Bowling 250	Richmond Raceway, Richmond, Virginia	September 11
25	Virginia is for Racing Lovers 250 (Note: The additional Richmond race replaced the Michigan race, the LTi Printing 250.)	Richmond Raceway, Richmond, Virginia	September 12
26	Food City 300	Bristol Motor Speedway, Bristol, Tennessee	September 18
NASCAR Xfinity Series Playoffs
Round of 12
27	Alsco 300	Las Vegas Motor Speedway, Las Vegas, Nevada	September 26
28	Ag-Pro 300 (Note: The additional Talladega race replaced the Mid-Ohio race, the B&L Transport 170.)	Talladega Superspeedway, Lincoln, Alabama	October 3
29	Drive for the Cure 250 presented by Blue Cross/Blue Shield of North Carolina	Charlotte Motor Speedway (Roval), Concord, North Carolina	October 10
Round of 8
30	Kansas Lottery 300	Kansas Speedway, Kansas City, Kansas	October 17
31	O'Reilly Auto Parts 300	Texas Motor Speedway, Fort Worth, Texas	October 24
32	Draft Top 250	Martinsville Speedway, Martinsville, Virginia	October 31
Championship 4
33	Desert Diamond Casino West Valley 200	Phoenix Raceway, Avondale, Arizona	November 7

=== Schedule changes ===
- The EchoPark 250 at Atlanta will no longer be the second race of the season and moves a month later to become the fifth race of the season, and also the first race after the West Coast swing.
- The order of races in the West Coast swing changes, with the series now going to Auto Club Speedway (Fontana) before Phoenix Raceway instead of the other way around as it had been in the past. Because there will be no race in between Daytona and the West Coast swing, Las Vegas will now be the second race of the season (instead of the third) and the flip-flop of California and Phoenix will be the third and fourth races. (Phoenix had been the fourth race previously and now is still the fourth race after this switch.)
- After being the season-finale for the Xfinity Series since 1995 and all three national series since 2002, Homestead–Miami Speedway lost its place as the last race of the season and will instead have its race in March between Atlanta and Texas on a weekend that had previously been an off weekend which will now be in April the week after Bristol.
- After previously having two races on the schedule, Richmond lost its spring date in favor of a race at Martinsville in October, which marks the series' first trip to the track in 14 years, when it hosted a race for one year in 2006 (in between when the series stopped going to Pikes Peak after 2005 and started going to Montreal in 2007). The race at Martinsville in October will be the second-to-last race of the season and the last race of the Round of 8 in the playoffs. The Gander RV & Outdoors Truck Series will now race on the spring weekend at Richmond instead, while Martinsville will only hold one truck race in the fall.
- After being held sometime in August every year it has been on the schedule, Mid-Ohio moves earlier in the season to become the first race held after Charlotte on Memorial Day weekend, replacing Pocono.
- The Pocono Green 225 at Pocono will be held on the last week of June, replacing Chicagoland. The race will be held on a Sunday afternoon instead of Saturday afternoon as part of the new "doubleheader-weekend" where the Cup Series will run both of their races at the track on the same weekend on consecutive days (on Saturday in addition to the Truck Series and Sunday in addition to the Xfinity Series).
- The Camping World 300 at Chicagoland moves a week earlier than it was in 2019. It now falls on Father's Day weekend, which had previously been an off-weekend for the series, and that off-weekend was moved to July after the race at New Hampshire, as NBC will start their half of the season earlier.
- After having hosted a night race on the Fourth of July weekend since 2002 in the Xfinity Series, Daytona's summer race will now be in August, trading places with Indianapolis but on January 15, 2020, it was announced the race will be contested on the road course instead of the oval.
- The U.S. Cellular 250 at Iowa moves back a week, on the weekend where Watkins Glen had been.
- After Mid-Ohio's race moved back to late May/early June, Road America's race moved into that weekend in August from where it had been previously later in the month.
- The Zippo 200 at The Glen at Watkins Glen moved two weeks later in place of the Food City 300 at Bristol, which will now be a month later and part of the playoffs.
- The Use Your Melon Drive Sober 200 at Dover was knocked out of the playoffs and into the regular season as a result of Bristol being put in. That race at Dover will now be held on August 22 (the weekend where Road America had been).
- Since Labor Day falls later in the year in 2020, the race at Daytona will now be held before Darlington instead of after so Darlington can remain on Labor Day weekend.
- The Go Bowling 250 at Richmond will now be earlier in September and become the last race before the start of the playoffs based on how the schedule works and the Alsco 300 at Las Vegas moves later in the month and into the playoffs.
- The Charlotte Roval race is now later in the fall and in October instead of September.
- After being the second-to-last race of the season for many years, Phoenix Raceway will be the last race of the season after Homestead was bumped back to March. However, because of how the schedule works (only one off-weekend in the playoffs instead of two), it will remain on the same weekend in early November, and the season will end a week earlier than in the past.

=== Schedule changes due to the COVID-19 pandemic ===
- The EchoPark 250 at Atlanta Motor Speedway and the 2020Census.gov 300 at Homestead–Miami Speedway were originally announced on March 12, 2020, due to the coronavirus (COVID-19) pandemic to take place without fans in attendance, but one day later on March 13, 2020, in respect of the NBA 2019–2020 season suspension, NASCAR announced that the two Cup races (including support races) would be postponed.
- On March 16, 2020, NASCAR announced all race events through May 3 were postponed due to the coronavirus (COVID-19) pandemic.
- On April 30, 2020, the sanctioning body announced an updated schedule for the month of May that included Xfinity races at Darlington Raceway and Charlotte Motor Speedway.
- On May 8, 2020, NASCAR announced that Chicagoland Speedway will not host an Xfinity Series race in 2020. A 2nd event at Darlington Raceway will replace the Chicagoland's race. That will be the first time since 2004 that Darlington hosts 2 Xfinity Series events in the same year.
- On May 14, 2020, NASCAR announced that Iowa Speedway will not host an Xfinity Series race in 2020. A second event at Homestead-Miami Speedway will replace the first Iowa race, while a second event at Kansas Speedway (announced on June 2) will replace the second Iowa race. That will be the first time ever that either Homestead or Kansas hosts two Xfinity Series events in the same year.
- On May 27, 2020, it was announced that the rescheduled Bristol race, scheduled for Saturday, May 30, would be rescheduled again to Monday, June 1 as a result of the Cup race at Charlotte originally scheduled for May 27 being delayed by a day due to rain. The reason for moving the Xfinity Bristol race to Monday night was logistics of moving NASCAR's timing and scoring, video replay, and television broadcasting equipment would not be set up and ready in time.
- The Dash 4 Cash races were supposed to be at Texas Motor Speedway, Bristol Motor Speedway, Talladega Superspeedway and Dover International Speedway, but after all the COVID-19 schedule changes, they changed to Atlanta, Homestead, Talladega, and Pocono with Bristol now serving as the qualification race for the Dash 4 Cash. Despite being in the middle of the races that do have it, the Saturday Homestead race will not be a Dash 4 Cash race.
- On July 8, 2020, NASCAR announced the series' schedule in the month of August. This included the move of the Watkins Glen race to the Daytona infield road course as a result of failing to get a waiver of Governor Andrew Cuomo's 14 day quarantine rule for anyone entering the state of New York from states that are COVID-19 hot spots, which includes North Carolina, where NASCAR teams are based. In that announcement, it was also made official that the standalone race at Mid-Ohio race would be cancelled and replaced, and the same would go for the June Michigan race, which had been scheduled in June but when the Cup Series races became a doubleheader, the date clashed with Road America, despite being a standalone race. Later, on August 6, NASCAR announced that an additional race at Talladega would replace the cancelled Mid-Ohio race and will be part of the Xfinity Series playoffs. An additional race at Richmond would replace the cancelled Michigan event. In that announcement, it was also revealed that the Xfinity Series playoff opener has been moved to Las Vegas Motor Speedway.

== Results and standings ==
=== Race results ===
No.	Race	Pole position	Most laps led	Winning driver	Manufacturer	No.	Winning team
1	NASCAR Racing Experience 300	Myatt Snider	Jeb Burton	Noah Gragson	Chevrolet	9	JR Motorsports
2	Boyd Gaming 300	Myatt Snider	Chase Briscoe	Chase Briscoe	Ford	98	Stewart–Haas Racing
3	Production Alliance Group 300	Brandon Jones	Brandon Jones	Harrison Burton	Toyota	20	Joe Gibbs Racing
4	LS Tractor 200	Kyle Busch	Kyle Busch	Brandon Jones	Toyota	19	Joe Gibbs Racing
5	Toyota 200	Noah Gragson	Noah Gragson	Chase Briscoe	Ford	98	Stewart–Haas Racing
6	Alsco 300	Ross Chastain	Kyle Busch	Kyle Busch	Toyota	54	Joe Gibbs Racing
7	Cheddar's 300	Harrison Burton	Justin Allgaier	Noah Gragson	Chevrolet	9	JR Motorsports
8	EchoPark 250	Noah Gragson	Austin Cindric	A. J. Allmendinger	Chevrolet	16	Kaulig Racing
9	Hooters 250	Harrison Burton	Noah Gragson	Harrison Burton	Toyota	20	Joe Gibbs Racing
10	Contender Boats 250	Myatt Snider	Noah Gragson	Chase Briscoe	Ford	98	Stewart–Haas Racing
11	Unhinged 300	Justin Haley	Ross Chastain	Justin Haley	Chevrolet	11	Kaulig Racing
12	Pocono Green 225	Noah Gragson	Ross Chastain	Chase Briscoe	Ford	98	Stewart–Haas Racing
13	Pennzoil 150	Jeb Burton	Chase Briscoe	Chase Briscoe	Ford	98	Stewart–Haas Racing
14	Shady Rays 200	Noah Gragson	Noah Gragson	Austin Cindric	Ford	22	Team Penske
15	Alsco 300	Myatt Snider	Austin Cindric	Austin Cindric	Ford	22	Team Penske
16	My Bariatric Solutions 300	Michael Annett	Justin Allgaier	Austin Cindric	Ford	22	Team Penske
17	Kansas Lottery 250	Michael Annett	Austin Cindric	Brandon Jones	Toyota	19	Joe Gibbs Racing
18	Henry 180	Michael Annett	Austin Cindric	Austin Cindric	Ford	22	Team Penske
19	UNOH 188	Austin Cindric	Chase Briscoe	Austin Cindric	Ford	22	Team Penske
20	Drydene 200 (Saturday)	Austin Cindric	Justin Allgaier	Justin Allgaier	Chevrolet	7	JR Motorsports
21	Drydene 200 (Sunday)	Brett Moffitt	Chase Briscoe	Chase Briscoe	Ford	98	Stewart–Haas Racing
22	Wawa 250	Chase Briscoe	A. J. Allmendinger	Justin Haley	Chevrolet	11	Kaulig Racing
23	Sport Clips Haircuts VFW 200	Justin Haley	Chase Briscoe	Brandon Jones	Toyota	19	Joe Gibbs Racing
24	Go Bowling 250	Ross Chastain	Justin Allgaier	Justin Allgaier	Chevrolet	7	JR Motorsports
25	Virginia is for Racing Lovers 250	Tommy Joe Martins	Justin Allgaier	Justin Allgaier	Chevrolet	7	JR Motorsports
26	Food City 300	Justin Allgaier	Justin Allgaier	Chase Briscoe	Ford	98	Stewart–Haas Racing
NASCAR Xfinity Series Playoffs
Round of 12
27	Alsco 300	Chase Briscoe	Chase Briscoe	Chase Briscoe	Ford	98	Stewart–Haas Racing
28	Ag-Pro 300	Chase Briscoe	Chase Briscoe	Justin Haley	Chevrolet	11	Kaulig Racing
29	Drive for the Cure 250	Noah Gragson	Chase Briscoe	A. J. Allmendinger	Chevrolet	16	Kaulig Racing
Round of 8
30	Kansas Lottery 300	Noah Gragson	Chase Briscoe	Chase Briscoe	Ford	98	Stewart–Haas Racing
31	O'Reilly Auto Parts 300	Chase Briscoe	Noah Gragson	Harrison Burton	Toyota	20	Joe Gibbs Racing
32	Draft Top 250	Austin Cindric	Harrison Burton	Harrison Burton	Toyota	20	Joe Gibbs Racing
Championship 4
33	Desert Diamond Casino West Valley 200	Justin Allgaier	Justin Allgaier	Austin Cindric	Ford	22	Team Penske

=== Drivers' championship ===
(key) Bold – Pole position awarded by time. Italics – Pole position set by final practice results, owner's points, previous race field inversion, random draw or competition-based formula. * – Most laps led. ^{1} – Stage 1 winner. ^{2} – Stage 2 winner^{1–10} – Regular season top 10 finishers.
. – Eliminated after Round of 12 . – Eliminated after Round of 8

Pos	Driver	DAY	LVS	CAL	PHO	DAR	CLT	BRI	ATL	HOM	HOM	TAL	POC	IRC	KEN	KEN	TEX	KAN	ROA	DRC	DOV	DOV	DAY	DAR	RCH	RCH	BRI	LVS	TAL	CLT	KAN	TEX	MAR	PHO	Pts.	Stage	Bonus
1	Austin Cindric	25	2	3	8	4	3	36	16*^{12}	2	10	4	29^{1}	5^{1}	1	1*^{2}	1	2*^{12}	1*	1^{1}	2^{1}	3	8	12	4^{1}	10	3	6	34	6	28	4	10	1^{2}	4040	–	50^{1}
2	Justin Allgaier	30^{2}	8^{2}	12	13^{1}	3	5	18*^{2}	6	32	22	28	6^{2}	7	20	5	3*^{12}	10	30	9	1*^{2}	7	29	31	1*^{2}	1*^{1}	5*^{12}	4	29	23	10	26	2	5*	4032	–	33^{5}
3	Justin Haley	6	12	5	5	10	29	17	3	13	6	1^{1}	23	2	7	3	8	6	11^{1}	38	8	12	1^{1}	13	2	6	16	10	1	35	4	7	12	8	4029	–	23^{6}
4	Chase Briscoe	5	1*^{1}	19	6	1	20	2	9	7	1	18^{2}	1	1*^{2}	4	2	2	14	3	29*^{2}	10	1*^{2}	3	11*	11	16	1	1*^{12}	19*^{12}	18*^{2}	1*^{12}	24	7	9^{1}	4028	–	60^{2}
NASCAR Xfinity Series Playoffs cut-off
Pos	Driver	DAY	LVS	CAL	PHO	DAR	CLT	BRI	ATL	HOM	HOM	TAL	POC	IRC	KEN	KEN	TEX	KAN	ROA	DRC	DOV	DOV	DAY	DAR	RCH	RCH	BRI	LVS	TAL	CLT	KAN	TEX	MAR	PHO	Pts.	Stage	Bonus
5	Noah Gragson	1	4	26	7^{2}	5*^{1}	11	1^{1}	2	3*^{2}	5*^{2}	10	22	3	11*^{12}	7^{1}	30	15	6	3	4	6	31	7	8	5	7	2	3	2	36	2*	3^{1}	2	2306	40	25^{4}
6	Brandon Jones	4	6	**30***^{12}	1	20	27	3	8	8	2	16	36	37	36	30	7	1	14	2	16	4	13	1	14	8	8	11	4	10	9	25^{1}	9	3	2273	46	20^{8}
7	Ross Chastain	22	10	8	9	8	4	28	7	9	3	2*	2*	6	3	4	9	5	7	36	3	2^{1}	6	2	5	3^{2}	2	16	6	5	12	16	5^{2}	7	2270	45	10^{3}
8	Harrison Burton **(R)**	2	5	1	2	9	9	4	5	1	8	32	32	25	17	12	4	3	16	8	5	11	5	6	16	4	4	9	23	33	11	1^{2}	1*	6	2248	40	14^{7}
9	Michael Annett	11	7	17	17	25	7	37	11	6	18	12	5	9	5	8	5	8	10	15	9	8	7	8	7	7	31	7	37	9	8	6	8	4	2202	19	2^{9}
10	Ryan Sieg	9	3	4	11	7	28	16	35	28^{1}	19^{1}	30	12	17	9	35	29	4	9	11	12	14	23	3	12	15	14	5	2	21	3	31	11	31	2187	8	2
11	Brandon Brown	7	11	33	12	13	8	7	12	14	36	11	33	11	27	13	10	11	12	34	14	16	26	17	18	11	12	15	9	26	13	5	18	12	2170	9	–
12	Riley Herbst **(R)**	32	9	2	10	18	12	27	17	10	9	37	9	33	2	10	36	9	23	7	6	9	4	4	10	34	10	12	35	12	30	32	6	11	2152	30	1^{10}
13	Jeremy Clements	28	31	9	36	12	32	8	13	12	27	24	3	13	12	11	11	12	29	6	13	19	20	32	17	17	11	13	20	16	15	27	15	10	666	20	–
14	Alex Labbé	10	18	13	22	17	16	33	27	25	23	9	17	8	24	24	31	21	15	27	19	17	30	16	23	12	13	32	10	4	23	11	27	21	609	27	–
15	Josh Williams	26	13	10	16	16	14	9	28	20	12	33	34	22	26	15	22	20	13	24	24	22	9	15	22	25	19	18	7	34	6	9	19	13	609	3	–
16	Myatt Snider **(R)**	**33**	16	11	14	35	10	5	29	15	7	27	4	16	15	31	34	22	32	10	17	18	19	10	36	31	35	19	26	14	21	29	23	18	561	24	–
17	Daniel Hemric		35	7	30	6	2	6	4		31		28			9		7	35	37		5	24	37				3	5	3	2			25	555	117	–
18	Anthony Alfredo			6		14			10	4	11	6		20	6	6	27				11	13	21	27			6	8	12		29	3			543	80	–
19	Jesse Little **(R)**	19	14	28	21	36	15	26	20	18	15	13	10	18	14	14	14	33	28	18	23	23	10	18	25	33	25	23	25	30	19	15	22	29	527	–	–
20	Tommy Joe Martins	DNQ	32	18	28	26	24	23	22	31	20	15	30	35	33	27	15	18	18	13	21	15	14	26	15	26	24	22	15	27	14	10	16	34	481	4	–
21	B. J. McLeod	13	33	24	20	15	17	11	25	26	34	23	14	29	18	20	20	31		20	34	25	32	14	29	24	34	26		22	17	17	33	14	433	–	–
22	Joe Graf Jr. **(R)**	36	20	31	31	19	19	13	26	16	13	34	35	26	13	22	21	28	25	26	18	21	37	23	19	27	27	27	31	15	32	22	21	27	422	1	–
23	Jeffrey Earnhardt					23	25	15	21	19	16	14	16	38	29	18	12	17	31	32	20	29	33	21	24	14	17	33	32	11	20	18	28	32	417	–	–
24	A. J. Allmendinger	DNQ						10	1		4	7		4					2^{2}	4			15*^{2}						24	1			26		366	48	12
25	Matt Mills	31	25	27	DNQ	34	30	25	30	27	24	38	25	30	30	19	26	26		22	33	30	16	22	13	13	22	30	21	25	25	13	38	35	346	–	–
26	Chad Finchum	20	21	20	24	24	22	24	34	30	21	22	26	27	16	33	24	29	36		29	24	25	20	37	28	20	35	11			34	37		322	–	–
27	Vinnie Miller	14	28	15	27	29	23	12	31	34	29	21	18	32	23	28	25	30	34		28	36	11	28	30	32	33	34	22		31				298	–	–
28	Jeb Burton	23*^{1}										3		31	34		6				7				32	2	9					30	4		275	49	1
29	Colby Howard				34	27	37	19	15	17	17				32	21	23				30	26	12	19	33	35	21	21	36			28	25	20	267	–	–
30	Kody Vanderwal **(R)**				29	32	35	21	37	37	33	31	19	28	25	29	32	27	27	23	31	27	34	29	28	29	29	31	28	20	26	21	29	22	263	–	–
31	Kyle Weatherman		30	34						33	35		15	15	8	36	28	36	21	17	25	35		36	26	20	32	36		37		19	30	17	236	5	–
32	David Starr	18	24	21	26												13	24			27	20		34							24	35		16	162	–	–
33	Kaz Grala																	13	4						9	9				31^{1}					147	28	1
34	Josh Bilicki	21		29										23					17	12									18	13					140	14	–
35	Stephen Leicht		34	35	33	39		34	36	36	38		27	21	35	34	35	37	22	21	22	31		35	34	22	36			24	35				138	–	–
36	Stefan Parsons									22	32		21				18				26	28					23	20					24		119	–	–
37	Mason Massey		29			30	21	30	23			20			28	23									27	21									118	–	–
38	Ryan Vargas												13					25						25					30	17	34	8	34	33	114	–	–
39	Jade Buford													14					19	16										8					105	14	–
40	Ray Black Jr.	8	17	22	25	21																													92	–	–
41	Dexter Bean												11				33	35						30	31	30	28	29			16				90	–	–
42	Andy Lally																		5	5															83	19	–
43	Garrett Smithley						31		24						31	16													8						75	–	–
44	Preston Pardus													10					8	31										32					74	7	–
45	Mike Harmon	16										25											17						17						73	–	–
46	Caesar Bacarella	29								29	30	17											36						13						68	–	–
47	Robby Lyons	17	23	23								19																							66	–	–
48	Colin Garrett	DNQ				37				21	14	35						16																	63	–	–
49	Joey Gase		19																				28		20	23									58	–	–
50	Ronnie Bassett Jr.					31		31	19						19	32																			53	–	–
51	Dale Earnhardt Jr.									5																									43	11	–
52	Dillon Bassett				18		13																												43	–	–
53	Carson Ware							22			28		20																						41	–	–
54	Jeff Green	QL			15		36	35				29	31																						39	–	–
55	Mike Wallace													24					24	25															38	–	–
56	C. J. McLaughlin	27																												29		20		37	36	–	–
57	Brandon Gdovic													12						28															34	–	–
58	Cody Ware																													7					30	–	–
59	Mason Diaz																																20	24	30	–	–
60	Scott Heckert																		33	19															23	1	–
61	R. C. Enerson																		20																18	1	–
62	Earl Bamber																			33															14	10	–
63	Stan Mullis																																	28	9	–	–
64	Patrick Emerling							29																											8	–	–
65	Bobby Reuse																			30															7	–	–
66	Donald Theetge																																31	36	7	–	–
67	Jairo Avila Jr.										37							32																	6	–	–
68	Carl Long																																32		5	–	–
69	Landon Cassill		36	36	35	38			Wth																										5	–	–
70	Chris Cockrum	34																																	3	–	–
71	John Jackson											39											35												3	–	–
72	Harold Crooms																			35															2	–	–
Ineligible for Xfinity Series driver points
Pos	Driver	DAY	LVS	CAL	PHO	DAR	CLT	BRI	ATL	HOM	HOM	TAL	POC	IRC	KEN	KEN	TEX	KAN	ROA	DRC	DOV	DOV	DAY	DAR	RCH	RCH	BRI	LVS	TAL	CLT	KAN	TEX	MAR	PHO	Pts.	Stage	Bonus
	Kyle Busch				**3***	2^{2}	1*^{12}										37								3												
	Gray Gaulding											8											2				18	24		28			35				
	Timmy Hill	3	26		23	22	34	14	33	23	25	26	8	19	21	26	17	19			36	34	22		36	36	15	28	14	19	22	36	17	23			
	Brad Keselowski				4																																
	Brett Moffitt	24	15	14	19	11	6		14	35		5	7	36	10	17	16	34			15	10	27	33	6	18	26	14	27	38	7	14	13	19			
	Austin Hill	35		16			33																	9				17	33	36	5	33					
	Denny Hamlin																							5^{12}													
	J. J. Yeley	12	22	25	DNQ					11																							14	26			
	Bayley Currey			32	DNQ	33	18	20	18	24	26		24	34	22	25	19	23	37	14	35	33		24	21	19	30	25			18	12	36	15			
	Joe Nemechek	15	27		32	28	26	32	32																				16								
	Tim Viens											36											18														
	Jesse Iwuji																		26												27	23		30			
	Korbin Forrister																				32	32															
	Josh Reaume																														33		39				
Pos	Driver	DAY	LVS	CAL	PHO	DAR	CLT	BRI	ATL	HOM	HOM	TAL	POC	IRC	KEN	KEN	TEX	KAN	ROA	DRC	DOV	DOV	DAY	DAR	RCH	RCH	BRI	LVS	TAL	CLT	KAN	TEX	MAR	PHO	Pts.	Stage	Bonus

=== Owners' championship (Top 15) ===
(key) Bold - Pole position awarded by time. Italics - Pole position set by final practice results, owner's points, previous race field inversion, random draw or competition-based formula. * – Most laps led. ^{1} – Stage 1 winner. ^{2} – Stage 2 winner. ^{1-10} – Owners' regular season top 10 finishers.
. – Eliminated after Round of 12 . – Eliminated after Round of 8

Pos.	No.	Car Owner	DAY	LVS	CAL	PHO	DAR	CLT	BRI	ATL	HOM	HOM	TAL	POC	IRC	KEN	KEN	TEX	KAN	ROA	DRC	DOV	DOV	DAY	DAR	RCH	RCH	BRI	LVS	TAL	CLT	KAN	TEX	MAR	PHO	Points	Bonus
1	22	Roger Penske	25	2	3	8	4	3	36	16*^{12}	2	10	4	29^{1}	5^{1}	1	1*^{2}	1	2*^{12}	1*	1^{1}	2^{1}	3	8	12	4^{1}	10	3	6	34	6	28	4	10	1^{2}	4040	50^{1}
2	7	Kelley Earnhardt Miller	30^{2}	8^{2}	12	13^{1}	3	5	18*^{2}	6	32	22	28	6^{2}	7	20	5	3*^{12}	10	30	9	1*^{2}	7	29	31	1*^{2}	1*^{1}	5*^{12}	4	29	23	10	26	2	5*	4032	33^{5}
3	11	Matt Kaulig	6	12	5	5	10	29	17	3	13	6	1^{1}	23	2	7	3	8	6	11^{1}	38	8	12	1^{1}	13	2	6	16	10	1	35	4	7	12	8	4029	23^{6}
4	98	Gene Haas	5	1*^{1}	19	6	1	20	2	9	7	1	18^{2}	1	1*^{2}	4	2	2	14	3	29*^{2}	10	1*^{2}	3	11*	11	16	1	1*^{12}	19*^{12}	18*^{2}	1*^{12}	24	7	9^{1}	4028	60^{2}
NASCAR Xfinity Series Playoffs cut-off
5	9	Rick Hendrick	1	4	26	7^{2}	5*^{1}	11	1^{1}	2	3*^{2}	5*^{2}	10	22	3	11*^{12}	7^{1}	30	15	6	3	4	6	31	7	8	5	7	2	3	2	36	2*	3^{1}	2	2306	25^{4}
6	19	Joe Gibbs	4	6	**30***^{12}	1	20	27	3	8	19	2	16	36	37	36	30	7	1	14	2	16	4	13	1	14	8	8	11	4	10	9	25^{1}	9	3	2273	20^{8}
7	10	Matt Kaulig	DNQ	10	8	9	8	4	28	7	9	3	2*	2*	6	3	4	9	5	7	36	3	2^{1}	6	2	5	3^{2}	2	16	6	5	12	16	5^{2}	7	2270	10^{3}
8	20	Joe Gibbs	2	5	1	2	9	9	4	5	1	8	32	32	25	17	12	4	3	16	8	5	11	5	6	16	4	4	9	23	33	11	1^{2}	1*	6	2248	14^{7}
9	8	Dale Earnhardt Jr.	23*^{1}	35	7	30	6	2	6	4	5	31	3	28	31	34	9	6	7	35	37	7	5	24	37	32	2	9	3	5	3	2	30	4	25	2213	1
10	1	Dale Earnhardt Jr.	11	7	17	17	25	7	37	11	6	18	12	5	9	5	8	5	8	10	15	9	8	7	8	7	7	31	7	37	9	8	6	8	4	2202	2^{9}
11	21	Richard Childress	**33**	16	6	14	14	10	5	10	4	11	6	4	20	6	6	27	13	4	33	11	13	21	27	9	9	6	8	12	31^{1}	29	3	23	18	2185	2^{10}
12	18	Joe Gibbs	32	9	2	10	18	12	27	17	10	9	37	9	33	2	10	36	9	23	7	6	9	4	4	10	34	10	12	35	12	30	32	6	11	2151	–
13	39	Rod Sieg	9	3	4	11	7	28	16	35	28^{1}	19^{1}	30	12	17	9	35	29	4	9	11	12	14	23	3	12	15	14	5	2	21	3	31	11	31	825	2
14	68	Jerry Brown	7	11	33	12	13	8	7	12	14	36	11	33	11	27	13	10	11	12	34	14	16	26	17	18	11	12	15	9	26	13	5	18	12	732	–
15	02	Chris Our	24	15	14	19	11	6	29	14	35	37	5	7	36	10	17	16	34	5	5	15	10	27	33	6	18	26	14	27	38	7	14	13	19	671	–
Pos.	No.	Car Owner	DAY	LVS	CAL	PHO	DAR	CLT	BRI	ATL	HOM	HOM	TAL	POC	IRC	KEN	KEN	TEX	KAN	ROA	DRC	DOV	DOV	DAY	DAR	RCH	RCH	BRI	LVS	TAL	CLT	KAN	TEX	MAR	PHO	Points	Bonus

=== Manufacturers' championship ===
Pos	Manufacturer	Wins	Points
1	Chevrolet	10	1190
2	Ford	15	1165
3	Toyota	8	1103

== See also ==
- 2020 NASCAR Cup Series
- 2020 NASCAR Gander RV & Outdoors Truck Series
- 2020 ARCA Menards Series
- 2020 ARCA Menards Series East
- 2020 ARCA Menards Series West
- 2020 NASCAR Whelen Modified Tour
- 2020 NASCAR Pinty's Series
- 2020 NASCAR Whelen Euro Series
- 2020 eNASCAR iRacing Pro Invitational Series
- 2020 EuroNASCAR Esports Series
