= 2020 Ag-Pro 300 =

Race details
- Race 28 of 33 in the 2020 NASCAR Xfinity Series season
- Date: October 3, 2020
- Location: Talladega Superspeedway in Lincoln, Alabama
- Course: Permanent racing facility
- Course length: 2.66 miles (4.28 km)
- Distance: 113 laps, 300.58 mi (483.74 km)
- Average speed: 140.458 mph

Pole position
Driver	Chase Briscoe	Stewart-Haas Racing
- Grid positions set by competition-based formula

Most laps led
Driver	Chase Briscoe	Stewart-Haas Racing
- Laps: 73

Winner
No. 11	Justin Haley	Kaulig Racing

The 2020 Ag-Pro 300 was a NASCAR Xfinity Series race held on October 3, 2020. It was contested over 113 laps on the 2.66-mile (4.28 km) tri-oval superspeedway. It was the twenty-eighth race of the 2020 NASCAR Xfinity Series season, the second race of the playoffs, and the second race in the Round of 12. Kaulig Racing driver Justin Haley collected his third win of the season.

== Report ==
=== Background ===
Talladega Superspeedway, originally known as Alabama International Motor Superspeedway (AIMS), is a motorsports complex located north of Talladega, Alabama. It is located on the former Anniston Air Force Base in the small city of Lincoln. The track is a tri-oval and was constructed in the 1960s by the International Speedway Corporation, a business controlled by the France family. Talladega is most known for its steep banking and the unique location of the start/finish line that's located just past the exit to pit road. The track currently hosts the NASCAR series such as the NASCAR Cup Series, Xfinity Series and the Camping World Truck Series. Talladega is the longest NASCAR oval with a length of 2.66-mile-long (4.28 km) tri-oval like the Daytona International Speedway, which also is a 2.5-mile-long (4 km) tri-oval.

The race was added to the schedule because of pandemic related cancellations, and spectators were restricted to campers in lots assigned by the speedway. No grandstands were open.

=== Entry list ===
- (R) denotes rookie driver.
- (i) denotes driver who is ineligible for series driver points.

No.	Driver	Team	Manufacturer
0	Jeffrey Earnhardt	JD Motorsports	Chevrolet
1	Michael Annett	JR Motorsports	Chevrolet
02	Brett Moffitt (i)	Our Motorsports	Chevrolet
4	Jesse Little (R)	JD Motorsports	Chevrolet
5	Matt Mills	B. J. McLeod Motorsports	Chevrolet
6	Ryan Vargas	JD Motorsports	Chevrolet
7	Justin Allgaier	JR Motorsports	Chevrolet
07	Garrett Smithley	SS-Green Light Racing	Chevrolet
8	Daniel Hemric	JR Motorsports	Chevrolet
08	Joe Graf Jr. (R)	SS-Green Light Racing	Chevrolet
9	Noah Gragson	JR Motorsports	Chevrolet
10	Ross Chastain	Kaulig Racing	Chevrolet
11	Justin Haley	Kaulig Racing	Chevrolet
13	Chad Finchum	MBM Motorsports	Toyota
15	Colby Howard	JD Motorsports	Chevrolet
16	A. J. Allmendinger	Kaulig Racing	Chevrolet
18	Riley Herbst (R)	Joe Gibbs Racing	Toyota
19	Brandon Jones	Joe Gibbs Racing	Toyota
20	Harrison Burton (R)	Joe Gibbs Racing	Toyota
21	Anthony Alfredo	Richard Childress Racing	Chevrolet
22	Austin Cindric	Team Penske	Ford
36	Alex Labbé	DGM Racing	Chevrolet
39	Ryan Sieg	RSS Racing	Chevrolet
44	Tommy Joe Martins	Martins Motorsports	Chevrolet
47	Joe Nemechek (i)	Mike Harmon Racing	Chevrolet
51	Jeremy Clements	Jeremy Clements Racing	Chevrolet
52	Kody Vanderwal (R)	Means Racing	Chevrolet
61	Austin Hill (i)	Hattori Racing Enterprises	Toyota
66	Timmy Hill (i)	MBM Motorsports	Toyota
68	Brandon Brown	Brandonbilt Motorsports	Chevrolet
74	Mike Harmon	Mike Harmon Racing	Chevrolet
78	Vinnie Miller	B. J. McLeod Motorsports	Chevrolet
90	Caesar Bacarella	DGM Racing	Chevrolet
92	Josh Williams	DGM Racing	Chevrolet
93	Myatt Snider (R)	RSS Racing	Chevrolet
98	Chase Briscoe	Stewart-Haas Racing	Ford
99	Josh Bilicki	B. J. McLeod Motorsports	Toyota
Official entry list

== Qualifying ==
Chase Briscoe was awarded the pole based on competition based formula.

=== Qualifying results ===
Pos	No	Driver	Team	Manufacturer
1	98	Chase Briscoe	Stewart-Haas Racing	Ford
2	9	Noah Gragson	JR Motorsports	Chevrolet
3	22	Austin Cindric	Team Penske	Ford
4	7	Justin Allgaier	JR Motorsports	Chevrolet
5	8	Daniel Hemric	JR Motorsports	Chevrolet
6	21	Anthony Alfredo	Richard Childress Racing	Chevrolet
7	39	Ryan Sieg	RSS Racing	Chevrolet
8	11	Justin Haley	Kaulig Racing	Chevrolet
9	1	Michael Annett	JR Motorsports	Chevrolet
10	19	Brandon Jones	Joe Gibbs Racing	Toyota
11	20	Harrison Burton (R)	Joe Gibbs Racing	Toyota
12	18	Riley Herbst (R)	Joe Gibbs Racing	Toyota
13	10	Ross Chastain	Kaulig Racing	Chevrolet
14	68	Brandon Brown	Brandonbilt Motorsports	Chevrolet
15	02	Brett Moffitt	Our Motorsports	Chevrolet
16	51	Jeremy Clements	Jeremy Clements Racing	Chevrolet
17	92	Josh Williams	DGM Racing	Chevrolet
18	61	Austin Hill (i)	Hattori Racing Enterprises	Toyota
19	93	Myatt Snider (R)	RSS Racing	Chevrolet
20	4	Jesse Little (R)	JD Motorsports	Chevrolet
21	44	Tommy Joe Martins	Martins Motorsports	Chevrolet
22	15	Colby Howard	JD Motorsports	Chevrolet
23	36	Alex Labbé	DGM Racing	Chevrolet
24	0	Jeffrey Earnhardt	JD Motorsports	Chevrolet
25	08	Joe Graf Jr.	SS-Green Light Racing	Chevrolet
26	07	Garrett Smithley	SS-Green Light Racing	Chevrolet
27	5	Matt Mills	B. J. McLeod Motorsports	Chevrolet
28	78	Vinnie Miller	B. J. McLeod Motorsports	Chevrolet
29	6	Ryan Vargas	JD Motorsports	Chevrolet
30	52	Kody Vanderwal (R)	Means Motorsports	Chevrolet
31	74	Mike Harmon	Mike Harmon Racing	Chevrolet
32	13	Chad Finchum	MBM Motorsports	Toyota
33	90	Caesar Bacarella	DGM Racing	Chevrolet
34	47	Joe Nemechek (i)	Mike Harmon Racing	Chevrolet
35	99	Josh Bilicki	B. J. McLeod Motorsports	Chevrolet
36	16	A. J. Allmendinger	Kaulig Racing	Chevrolet
37	66	Timmy Hill	MBM Motorsports	Toyota
Official qualifying results

== Race ==
=== Race results ===
==== Stage Results ====
Stage One Laps: 25

Pos	No	Driver	Team	Manufacturer	Points
1	98	Chase Briscoe	Stewart-Haas Racing	Ford	10
2	22	Austin Cindric	Team Penske	Ford	9
3	19	Brandon Jones	Joe Gibbs Racing	Toyota	8
4	11	Justin Haley	Kaulig Racing	Chevrolet	7
5	21	Anthony Alfredo	Richard Childress Racing	Chevrolet	6
6	18	Riley Herbst (R)	Joe Gibbs Racing	Toyota	5
7	39	Ryan Sieg	RSS Racing	Chevrolet	4
8	20	Harrison Burton	Joe Gibbs Racing	Toyota	3
9	8	Daniel Hemric	JR Motorsports	Chevrolet	2
10	7	Justin Allgaier	JR Motorsports	Chevrolet	1

Stage Two Laps: 25

Pos	No	Driver	Team	Manufacturer	Points
1	98	Chase Briscoe	Stewart-Haas Racing	Ford	10
2	22	Austin Cindric	Team Penske	Ford	9
3	8	Daniel Hemric	JR Motorsports	Chevrolet	8
4	11	Justin Haley	Kaulig Racing	Chevrolet	7
5	7	Justin Allgaier	JR Motorsports	Chevrolet	6
6	20	Harrison Burton	Joe Gibbs Racing	Toyota	5
7	19	Brandon Jones	Joe Gibbs Racing	Toyota	4
8	39	Ryan Sieg	RSS Racing	Chevrolet	3
9	68	Brandon Brown	Brandonbilt Motorsports	Chevrolet	2
10	9	Noah Gragson	JR Motorsports	Chevrolet	1

=== Final Stage Results ===
Laps: 63

Pos	Grid	No	Driver	Team	Manufacturer	Laps	Points	Status
1	8	11	Justin Haley	Kaulig Racing	Chevrolet	113	54	Running
2	7	39	Ryan Sieg	RSS Racing	Chevrolet	113	42	Running
3	2	9	Noah Gragson	JR Motorsports	Chevrolet	113	35	Running
4	10	19	Brandon Jones	Joe Gibbs Racing	Toyota	113	45	Running
5	5	8	Daniel Hemric	Richard Childress Racing	Chevrolet	113	42	Running
6	13	10	Ross Chastain	Kaulig Racing	Chevrolet	113	31	Running
7	17	92	Josh Williams	DGM Racing	Chevrolet	113	30	Running
8	26	07	Garrett Smithley	SS-Green Light Racing	Chevrolet	113	29	Running
9	14	68	Brandon Brown	Brandonbilt Motorsports	Chevrolet	113	30	Running
10	23	36	Alex Labbé	DGM Racing	Chevrolet	113	27	Running
11	32	13	Chad Finchum	MBM Motorsports	Toyota	113	26	Running
12	6	21	Anthony Alfredo	Richard Childress Racing	Chevrolet	113	31	Running
13	33	90	Caesar Bacarella	DGM Racing	Chevrolet	113	24	Running
14	37	66	Timmy Hill (i)	MBM Motorsports	Toyota	113	0	Running
15	21	44	Tommy Joe Martins	Martins Motorsports	Chevrolet	113	22	Running
16	34	47	Joe Nemechek	Mike Harmon Racing	Chevrolet	113	0	Running
17	31	74	Mike Harmon	Mike Harmon Racing	Chevrolet	113	20	Running
18	35	99	Josh Bilicki	B. J. McLeod Motorsports	Chevrolet	113	19	Running
19	1	98	Chase Briscoe	Stewart-Haas Racing	Ford	113	38	Running
20	16	51	Jeremy Clements	Jeremy Clements Racing	Chevrolet	113	17	Running
21	27	5	Matt Mills	B. J. McLeod Motorsports	Chevrolet	113	16	Running
22	28	78	Vinnie Miller	B. J. McLeod Motorsports	Chevrolet	113	15	Running
23	11	20	Harrison Burton (R)	Joe Gibbs Racing	Toyota	113	22	Running
24	36	16	A. J. Allmendinger	Kaulig Racing	Chevrolet	112	13	Accident
25	20	4	Jesse Little (R)	JD Motorsports	Chevrolet	112	12	Accident
26	19	93	Myatt Snider (R)	RSS Racing	Chevrolet	112	11	Accident
27	15	02	Brett Moffitt (i)	Our Motorsports	Chevrolet	112	0	Accident
28	30	52	Kody Vanderwal (R)	Means Motorsports	Chevrolet	100	9	Running
29	4	7	Justin Allgaier	JR Motorsports	Chevrolet	95	15	Engine
30	29	6	Ryan Vargas	JD Motorsports	Chevrolet	92	7	Suspension
31	25	08	Joe Graf Jr.	SS-Green Light Racing	Chevrolet	77	6	Engine
32	24	0	Jeffrey Earnhardt	JD Motorsports	Chevrolet	76	5	Accident
33	18	61	Austin Hill (i)	Hattori Racing Enterprises	Toyota	75	0	Accident
34	3	22	Austin Cindric	Team Penske	Ford	75	21	Accident
35	12	18	Riley Herbst	Joe Gibbs Racing	Toyota	48	7	DVP
36	22	15	Colby Howard	JD Motorsports	Chevrolet	45	1	Accident
DSQ	9	1	Michael Annett	JR Motorsports	Chevrolet	113	1	Disqualified
Official race results

=== Race statistics ===
- Lead changes: 13 among 9 different drivers
- Cautions/Laps: 7 for 25
- Time of race: 2 hours, 8 minutes, and 24 seconds
- Average speed: 140.458 mph (226.045 km/h)
- Fastest lap speed: 195.900
- Fastest lap: 48.882

Previous race: 2020 Alsco 300	NASCAR Xfinity Series; 2020 season	Next race: 2020 Drive for the Cure 250
