= 2020 Alsco 300 (Las Vegas) =

Race details
- Race 27 of 33 in the 2020 NASCAR Xfinity Series season
- Las Vegas Motor Speedway
- Date: September 26, 2020
- Location: Las Vegas Motor Speedway in Las Vegas, Nevada
- Course: Permanent racing facility
- Course length: 1.50 miles (2.41 km)
- Distance: 200 laps, 300.0 mi (482.8 km)
- Average speed: 127.796 mph

Pole position
Driver	Chase Briscoe	Stewart-Haas Racing
- Grid positions set by competition-based formula

Most laps led
Driver	Chase Briscoe	Stewart-Haas Racing
- Laps: 164

Winner
No. 98	Chase Briscoe	Stewart-Haas Racing

The 2020 Alsco 300 was a NASCAR Xfinity Series race held on September 26, 2020. It was contested over 200 laps on the 1.50-mile (2.41 km) tri-oval. It was the twenty-seventh race of the 2020 NASCAR Xfinity Series season, and the first race of the playoffs, as well as the Round of 12. Stewart-Haas Racing driver Chase Briscoe collected his eighth win of the season.

== Report ==
=== Background ===
Las Vegas Motor Speedway, located in Clark County, Nevada outside the Las Vegas city limits and about 15 miles northeast of the Las Vegas Strip, is a 1,200-acre (490 ha) complex of multiple tracks for motorsports racing. The complex is owned by Speedway Motorsports, Inc., which is headquartered in Charlotte, North Carolina.

=== Entry list ===
- (R) denotes rookie driver.
- (i) denotes driver who is ineligible for series driver points.

No.	Driver	Team	Manufacturer
0	Jeffrey Earnhardt	JD Motorsports	Chevrolet
1	Michael Annett	JR Motorsports	Chevrolet
02	Brett Moffitt (i)	Our Motorsports	Chevrolet
4	Jesse Little (R)	JD Motorsports	Chevrolet
5	Matt Mills	B. J. McLeod Motorsports	Chevrolet
6	B. J. McLeod	JD Motorsports	Chevrolet
7	Justin Allgaier	JR Motorsports	Chevrolet
07	Gray Gaulding	SS-Green Light Racing	Chevrolet
8	Daniel Hemric	JR Motorsports	Chevrolet
08	Joe Graf Jr. (R)	SS-Green Light Racing	Chevrolet
9	Noah Gragson	JR Motorsports	Chevrolet
10	Ross Chastain	Kaulig Racing	Chevrolet
11	Justin Haley	Kaulig Racing	Chevrolet
13	Timmy Hill (i)	MBM Motorsports	Toyota
15	Colby Howard	JD Motorsports	Chevrolet
18	Riley Herbst (R)	Joe Gibbs Racing	Toyota
19	Brandon Jones	Joe Gibbs Racing	Toyota
20	Harrison Burton (R)	Joe Gibbs Racing	Toyota
21	Anthony Alfredo	Richard Childress Racing	Chevrolet
22	Austin Cindric	Team Penske	Ford
36	Alex Labbé	DGM Racing	Chevrolet
39	Ryan Sieg	RSS Racing	Chevrolet
44	Tommy Joe Martins	Martins Motorsports	Chevrolet
47	Kyle Weatherman	Mike Harmon Racing	Chevrolet
51	Jeremy Clements	Jeremy Clements Racing	Chevrolet
52	Kody Vanderwal (R)	Means Racing	Chevrolet
61	Austin Hill (i)	Hattori Racing Enterprises	Toyota
66	Chad Finchum	MBM Motorsports	Toyota
68	Brandon Brown	Brandonbilt Motorsports	Chevrolet
74	Bayley Currey (i)	Mike Harmon Racing	Chevrolet
78	Stefan Parsons	B. J. McLeod Motorsports	Toyota
90	Dexter Bean	DGM Racing	Chevrolet
92	Josh Williams	DGM Racing	Chevrolet
93	Myatt Snider (R)	RSS Racing	Chevrolet
98	Chase Briscoe	Stewart-Haas Racing	Ford
99	Vinnie Miller	B. J. McLeod Motorsports	Chevrolet
Official entry list

== Qualifying ==
Chase Briscoe was awarded the pole based on competition based formula.

=== Qualifying results ===
Pos	No	Driver	Team	Manufacturer
1	98	Chase Briscoe	Stewart-Haas Racing	Ford
2	22	Austin Cindric	Team Penske	Ford
3	7	Justin Allgaier	JR Motorsports	Chevrolet
4	10	Ross Chastain	Kaulig Racing	Chevrolet
5	20	Harrison Burton (R)	Joe Gibbs Racing	Toyota
6	9	Noah Gragson	JR Motorsports	Chevrolet
7	19	Brandon Jones	Joe Gibbs Racing	Toyota
8	21	Anthony Alfredo	Richard Childress Racing	Chevrolet
9	18	Riley Herbst (R)	Joe Gibbs Racing	Toyota
10	11	Justin Haley	Kaulig Racing	Chevrolet
11	68	Brandon Brown	Brandonbilt Motorsports	Chevrolet
12	39	Ryan Sieg	RSS Racing	Chevrolet
13	1	Michael Annett	JR Motorsports	Chevrolet
14	8	Daniel Hemric	JR Motorsports	Chevrolet
15	51	Jeremy Clements	Jeremy Clements Racing	Chevrolet
16	36	Alex Labbé	DGM Racing	Chevrolet
17	07	Gray Gaulding	SS-Green Light Racing	Chevrolet
18	92	Josh Williams	DGM Racing	Chevrolet
19	0	Jeffrey Earnhardt	JD Motorsports	Chevrolet
20	02	Brett Moffitt	Our Motorsports	Chevrolet
21	13	Timmy Hill (i)	MBM Motorsports	Toyota
22	44	Tommy Joe Martins	Martins Motorsports	Chevrolet
23	5	Matt Mills	B. J. McLeod Motorsports	Chevrolet
24	4	Jesse Little (R)	JD Motorsports	Chevrolet
25	15	Colby Howard	JD Motorsports	Chevrolet
26	78	Stefan Parsons	B. J. McLeod Motorsports	Toyota
27	08	Joe Graf Jr. (R)	SS-Green Light Racing	Chevrolet
28	6	B. J. McLeod	JD Motorsports	Chevrolet
29	61	Austin Hill (i)	Hattori Racing Enterprises	Toyota
30	90	Dexter Bean	DGM Racing	Chevrolet
31	74	Bayley Currey (i)	Mike Harmon Racing	Chevrolet
32	93	Myatt Snider (R)	RSS Racing	Chevrolet
33	47	Kyle Weatherman	Mike Harmon Racing	Chevrolet
34	52	Kody Vanderwal (R)	Means Motorsports	Chevrolet
35	99	Vinnie Miller	B. J. McLeod Motorsports	Chevrolet
36	66	Chad Finchum	MBM Motorsports	Toyota
Official qualifying results

== Race ==
=== Race results ===
==== Stage Results ====
Stage One Laps: 45

Pos	No	Driver	Team	Manufacturer	Points
1	98	Chase Briscoe	Stewart-Haas Racing	Ford	10
2	10	Ross Chastain	Kaulig Racing	Chevrolet	9
3	39	Ryan Sieg	RSS Racing	Chevrolet	8
4	9	Noah Gragson	JR Motorsports	Chevrolet	7
5	21	Anthony Alfredo	Richard Childress Racing	Chevrolet	6
6	11	Justin Haley	Kaulig Racing	Chevrolet	5
7	22	Austin Cindric	Team Penske	Ford	4
8	8	Daniel Hemric	JR Motorsports	Chevrolet	3
9	19	Brandon Jones	Joe Gibbs Racing	Toyota	2
10	18	Riley Herbst (R)	Joe Gibbs Racing	Toyota	1

Stage Two Laps: 45

Pos	No	Driver	Team	Manufacturer	Points
1	98	Chase Briscoe	Stewart-Haas Racing	Ford	10
2	9	Noah Gragson	JR Motorsports	Chevrolet	9
3	22	Austin Cindric	Team Penske	Ford	8
4	39	Ryan Sieg	RSS Racing	Chevrolet	7
5	21	Anthony Alfredo	Richard Childress Racing	Chevrolet	6
6	19	Brandon Jones	Joe Gibbs Racing	Toyota	5
7	11	Justin Haley	Kaulig Racing	Chevrolet	4
8	8	Daniel Hemric	JR Motorsports	Chevrolet	3
9	7	Justin Allgaier	JR Motorsports	Chevrolet	2
10	18	Riley Herbst (R)	Joe Gibbs Racing	Toyota	1

=== Final Stage Results ===
Laps: 110

Pos	Grid	No	Driver	Team	Manufacturer	Laps	Points	Status
1	1	98	Chase Briscoe	Stewart-Haas Racing	Ford	200	60	Running
2	6	9	Noah Gragson	JR Motorsports	Chevrolet	200	51	Running
3	14	8	Daniel Hemric	JR Motorsports	Chevrolet	200	40	Running
4	3	7	Justin Allgaier	JR Motorsports	Chevrolet	200	35	Running
5	12	39	Ryan Sieg	RSS Racing	Chevrolet	200	47	Running
6	2	22	Austin Cindric	Team Penske	Ford	200	43	Running
7	13	1	Michael Annett	JR Motorsports	Chevrolet	200	30	Running
8	8	21	Anthony Alfredo	Richard Childress Racing	Chevrolet	200	41	Running
9	5	20	Harrison Burton	Joe Gibbs Racing	Toyota	200	28	Running
10	10	11	Justin Haley	Kaulig Racing	Chevrolet	200	36	Running
11	7	19	Brandon Jones	Joe Gibbs Racing	Toyota	200	33	Running
12	9	18	Riley Herbst	Stewart-Haas Racing	Ford	200	27	Running
13	15	51	Jeremy Clements	Jeremy Clements Racing	Chevrolet	200	24	Running
14	20	02	Brett Moffitt (i)	Our Motorsports	Chevrolet	200	0	Running
15	11	68	Brandon Brown	Brandonbilt Motorsports	Chevrolet	200	22	Running
16	4	10	Ross Chastain	Kaulig Racing	Chevrolet	200	30	Running
17	29	61	Austin Hill (i)	Hattori Racing Enterprises	Toyota	199	0	Running
18	18	92	Josh Williams	DGM Racing	Chevrolet	199	19	Running
19	32	93	Myatt Snider (R)	RSS Racing	Chevrolet	199	18	Running
20	26	78	Stefan Parsons	B. J. McLeod Motorsports	Toyota	199	17	Running
21	25	15	Colby Howard	JD Motorsports	Chevrolet	198	16	Running
22	22	44	Tommy Joe Martins	Martins Motorsports	Chevrolet	198	15	Running
23	24	4	Jesse Little (R)	JD Motorsports	Chevrolet	198	14	Running
24	17	07	Gray Gaulding (i)	SS-Green Light Racing	Chevrolet	197	0	Running
25	31	74	Bayley Currey (i)	Mike Harmon Racing	Chevrolet	197	0	Running
26	28	6	B. J. McLeod	JD Motorsports	Chevrolet	197	11	Running
27	27	08	Joe Graf Jr. (R)	SS-Green Light Racing	Chevrolet	196	10	Running
28	21	13	Timmy Hill (i)	MBM Motorsports	Toyota	196	0	Running
29	30	90	Dexter Bean	DGM Racing	Chevrolet	195	8	Running
30	23	5	Matt Mills	B. J. McLeod Motorsports	Chevrolet	194	7	Running
31	34	52	Kody Vanderwal (R)	Means Motorsports	Chevrolet	191	6	Running
32	16	36	Alex Labbé	DGM Racing	Chevrolet	179	5	Electrical
33	19	0	Jeffrey Earnhardt	JD Motorsports	Chevrolet	166	4	Running
34	35	99	Vinnie Miller	B. J. McLeod Motorsports	Chevrolet	51	3	Too Slow
35	36	66	Chad Finchum	MBM Motorsports	Toyota	36	2	Suspension
36	33	47	Kyle Weatherman	Mike Harmon Racing	Chevrolet	7	1	Accident
Official race results

=== Race statistics ===
- Lead changes: 8 among 5 different drivers
- Cautions/Laps: 6 for 28
- Time of race: 2 hours, 20 minutes, and 51 seconds
- Average speed: 127.796 mph (205.668 km/h)

Previous race: 2020 Food City 300	NASCAR Xfinity Series; 2020 season	Next race: 2020 Ag-Pro 300
