= 2020 Virginia is for Racing Lovers 250 =

2020 Virginia Is For Racing Lovers 250
Race details
- Race 25 of 33 in the 2020 NASCAR Xfinity Series season
- Date: September 22, 2020
- Location: Richmond Raceway in Richmond, Virginia
- Course: Permanent racing facility
- Course length: 0.75 miles (1.21 km)
- Distance: 250 laps, 187.50 mi (301.75 km)
- Average speed: 92.39 mph

Pole position
Driver	Tommy Joe Martins	Martins Motorsports
- Grid positions set by competition-based formula

Most laps led
Driver	Justin Allgaier	JR Motorsports
- Laps: 135

Winner
No. 7	Justin Allgaier	JR Motorsports

The 2020 Virginia Is For Racing Lovers 250 was a NASCAR Xfinity Series race held on September 12, 2020. It was contested over 250 laps on the 0.75-mile (1.21 km) tri-oval. It was the twenty-fifth race of the 2020 NASCAR Xfinity Series season. JR Motorsports driver Justin Allgaier collected his third win of the season.

== Report ==
=== Background ===
Richmond Raceway is a 3/4-mile (1.2 km), D-shaped, asphalt race track located just outside Richmond, Virginia in Henrico County. It hosts the NASCAR Cup Series and Xfinity Series. Known as "America's premier short track", it formerly hosted an IndyCar Series race and two USAC sprint car races.

=== Entry list ===
- (R) denotes rookie driver.
- (i) denotes driver who is ineligible for series driver points.

No.	Driver	Team	Manufacturer
0	Jeffrey Earnhardt	JD Motorsports	Chevrolet
1	Michael Annett	JR Motorsports	Chevrolet
02	Brett Moffitt (i)	Our Motorsports	Chevrolet
4	Jesse Little (R)	JD Motorsports	Chevrolet
5	Matt Mills	B. J. McLeod Motorsports	Chevrolet
6	B. J. McLeod	JD Motorsports	Chevrolet
7	Justin Allgaier	JR Motorsports	Chevrolet
07	Joey Gase	SS-Green Light Racing	Chevrolet
8	Jeb Burton	JR Motorsports	Chevrolet
08	Joe Graf Jr. (R)	SS-Green Light Racing	Chevrolet
9	Noah Gragson	JR Motorsports	Chevrolet
10	Ross Chastain	Kaulig Racing	Chevrolet
11	Justin Haley	Kaulig Racing	Chevrolet
13	Stephen Leicht	MBM Motorsports	Toyota
15	Colby Howard	JD Motorsports	Chevrolet
18	Riley Herbst (R)	Joe Gibbs Racing	Toyota
19	Brandon Jones	Joe Gibbs Racing	Toyota
20	Harrison Burton (R)	Joe Gibbs Racing	Toyota
21	Kaz Grala	Richard Childress Racing	Chevrolet
22	Austin Cindric	Team Penske	Ford
36	Alex Labbé	DGM Racing	Chevrolet
39	Ryan Sieg	RSS Racing	Chevrolet
44	Tommy Joe Martins	Martins Motorsports	Chevrolet
47	Kyle Weatherman	Mike Harmon Racing	Chevrolet
51	Jeremy Clements	Jeremy Clements Racing	Chevrolet
52	Kody Vanderwal (R)	Means Racing	Chevrolet
61	Chad Finchum	Hattori Racing	Toyota
66	Timmy Hill (i)	MBM Motorsports	Toyota
68	Brandon Brown	Brandonbilt Motorsports	Chevrolet
74	Bayley Currey (i)	Mike Harmon Racing	Chevrolet
78	Mason Massey	B. J. McLeod Motorsports	Toyota
90	Dexter Bean	DGM Racing	Chevrolet
92	Josh Williams	DGM Racing	Chevrolet
93	Myatt Snider (R)	RSS Racing	Chevrolet
98	Chase Briscoe	Stewart-Haas Racing	Ford
99	Vinnie Miller	B. J. McLeod Motorsports	Chevrolet
Official entry list

== Qualifying ==
Tommy Joe Martins was awarded the pole based on the top 15 finishers from the previous day's race being inverted, minus Kyle Busch, who finished 3rd the previous day but was not entered in this race; Justin Haley and Justin Allgaier would thus start 13th and 14th.

=== Qualifying results ===
Pos	No	Driver	Team	Manufacturer
1	44	Tommy Joe Martins	Martins Motorsports	Chevrolet
2	19	Brandon Jones	Joe Gibbs Racing	Toyota
3	5	Matt Mills	B. J. McLeod Motorsports	Chevrolet
4	39	Ryan Sieg	RSS Racing	Chevrolet
5	98	Chase Briscoe	Stewart-Haas Racing	Ford
6	18	Riley Herbst (R)	Joe Gibbs Racing	Toyota
7	21	Kaz Grala	Richard Childress Racing	Chevrolet
8	9	Noah Gragson	JR Motorsports	Chevrolet
9	1	Michael Annett	JR Motorsports	Chevrolet
10	02	Brett Moffitt (i)	Our Motorsports	Chevrolet
11	10	Ross Chastain	Kaulig Racing	Chevrolet
12	22	Austin Cindric	Team Penske	Ford
13	11	Justin Haley	Kaulig Racing	Chevrolet
14	7	Justin Allgaier	JR Motorsports	Chevrolet
15	20	Harrison Burton (R)	Joe Gibbs Racing	Toyota
16	68	Brandon Brown	Brandonbilt Motorsports	Chevrolet
17	51	Jeremy Clements	Jeremy Clements Racing	Chevrolet
18	07	Joey Gase	SS-Green Light Racing	Chevrolet
19	92	Josh Williams	DGM Racing	Chevrolet
20	36	Alex Labbé	DGM Racing	Chevrolet
21	8	Jeb Burton	JR Motorsports	Chevrolet
22	08	Joe Graf Jr. (R)	SS-Green Light Racing	Chevrolet
23	0	Jeffrey Earnhardt	JD Motorsports	Chevrolet
24	4	Jesse Little (R)	JD Motorsports	Chevrolet
25	74	Bayley Currey (i)	Mike Harmon Racing	Chevrolet
26	6	B. J. McLeod	JD Motorsports	Chevrolet
27	93	Myatt Snider (R)	RSS Racing	Chevrolet
28	78	Mason Massey	B. J. McLeod Motorsports	Toyota
29	15	Colby Howard	JD Motorsports	Chevrolet
30	47	Kyle Weatherman	Mike Harmon Racing	Chevrolet
31	90	Dexter Bean	DGM Racing	Chevrolet
32	52	Kody Vanderwal	Means Motorsports	Chevrolet
33	61	Chad Finchum	Hattori Racing Enterprises	Toyota
34	99	Vinnie Miller	B. J. McLeod Motorsports	Chevrolet
35	13	Stephen Leicht	MBM Motorsports	Toyota
36	66	Timmy Hill (i)	MBM Motorsports	Toyota
Official qualifying results

== Race ==
=== Race results ===
==== Stage results ====
Stage one Laps: 75

Pos	No	Driver	Team	Manufacturer	Points
1	7	Justin Allgaier	JR Motorsports	Chevrolet	10
2	9	Noah Gragson	JR Motorsports	Chevrolet	9
3	11	Justin Haley	Kaulig Racing	Chevrolet	8
4	10	Ross Chastain	Kaulig Racing	Chevrolet	7
5	20	Harrison Burton	Joe Gibbs Racing	Toyota	6
6	1	Michael Annett	JR Motorsports	Chevrolet	5
7	18	Riley Herbst (R)	Joe Gibbs Racing	Toyota	4
8	8	Jeb Burton	JR Motorsports	Chevrolet	3
9	39	Ryan Sieg	RSS Racing	Chevrolet	2
10	21	Kaz Grala	Richard Childress Racing	Chevrolet	1

Stage two Laps: 75

Pos	No	Driver	Team	Manufacturer	Points
1	10	Ross Chastain	Kaulig Racing	Chevrolet	10
2	11	Justin Haley	Kaulig Racing	Chevrolet	9
3	8	Jeb Burton	JR Motorsports	Chevrolet	8
4	98	Chase Briscoe	Stewart-Haas Racing	Ford	7
5	20	Harrison Burton (R)	Joe Gibbs Racing	Toyota	6
6	22	Austin Cindric	Team Penske	Ford	5
7	18	Riley Herbst (R)	Joe Gibbs Racing	Toyota	4
8	7	Justin Allgaier	JR Motorsports	Chevrolet	3
9	9	Noah Gragson	JR Motorsports	Chevrolet	2
10	21	Kaz Grala	Richard Childress Racing	Chevrolet	1

=== Final stage results ===
Laps: 100

Pos	Grid	No	Driver	Team	Manufacturer	Laps	Points	Status
1	14	7	Justin Allgaier	JR Motorsports	Chevrolet	250	53	Running
2	21	8	Jeb Burton	JR Motorsports	Chevrolet	250	46	Running
3	11	10	Ross Chastain	Kaulig Racing	Chevrolet	250	51	Running
4	15	20	Harrison Burton (R)	Joe Gibbs Racing	Toyota	250	45	Running
5	8	9	Noah Gragson	JR Motorsports	Chevrolet	250	43	Running
6	13	11	Justin Haley	Kaulig Racing	Chevrolet	250	48	Running
7	9	1	Michael Annett	JR Motorsports	Chevrolet	250	35	Running
8	2	19	Brandon Jones	Joe Gibbs Racing	Toyota	250	29	Running
9	7	21	Kaz Grala	Richard Childress Racing	Chevrolet	250	30	Running
10	12	22	Austin Cindric	Team Penske	Ford	250	32	Running
11	16	68	Brandon Brown	Brandonbilt Motorsports	Chevrolet	250	26	Running
12	20	36	Alex Labbé	DGM Racing	Chevrolet	250	25	Running
13	3	5	Matt Mills	B. J. McLeod Motorsports	Chevrolet	250	24	Running
14	23	0	Jeffrey Earnhardt	JD Motorsports	Chevrolet	250	23	Running
15	4	39	Ryan Sieg	RSS Racing	Chevrolet	249	24	Running
16	5	98	Chase Briscoe	Stewart-Haas Racing	Ford	249	28	Running
17	17	51	Jeremy Clements	Jeremy Clements Racing	Chevrolet	249	20	Running
18	10	02	Brett Moffitt (i)	Our Motorsports	Chevrolet	249	9	Running
19	25	74	Bayley Currey (i)	Mike Harmon Racing	Chevrolet	249	0	Running
20	30	47	Kyle Weatherman	Mike Harmon Racing	Chevrolet	248	17	Running
21	28	78	Mason Massey	B. J. McLeod Motorsports	Toyota	248	16	Running
22	35	13	Stephen Leicht	MBM Motorsports	Toyota	247	15	Running
23	18	07	Joey Gase	SS-Green Light Racing	Chevrolet	247	14	Running
24	26	6	B. J. McLeod	JD Motorsports	Chevrolet	247	13	Running
25	19	92	Josh Williams	DGM Racing	Chevrolet	247	12	Running
26	1	44	Tommy Joe Martins	Martins Motorsports	Chevrolet	247	11	Running
27	22	08	Joe Graf Jr. (R)	SS-Green Light Racing	Chevrolet	247	10	Running
28	33	61	Chad Finchum	Hattori Racing Enterprises	Toyota	246	9	Running
29	32	52	Kody Vanderwal (R)	Means Motorsports	Chevrolet	246	8	Running
30	31	90	Dexter Bean	DGM Racing	Chevrolet	246	7	Running
31	27	93	Myatt Snider (R)	RSS Racing	Chevrolet	246	6	Running
32	34	99	Vinnie Miller	B. J. McLeod Motorsports	Chevrolet	245	5	Running
33	24	4	Jesse Little (R)	JD Motorsports	Chevrolet	244	4	Running
34	6	18	Riley Herbst (R)	Joe Gibbs Racing	Toyota	227	11	Accident
35	29	15	Colby Howard	JD Motorsports	Chevrolet	140	2	Accident
36	36	66	Timmy Hill (i)	MBM Motorsports	Toyota	56	0	Fuel Pump
Official race results

=== Race statistics ===
- Lead changes: 9 among 6 different drivers
- Cautions/Laps: 5 for 29
- Time of race: 2 hours, 1 minutes, and 46 seconds
- Average speed: 92.39 mph (148.69 km/h)

Previous race: 2020 Go Bowling 250	NASCAR Xfinity Series; 2020 season	Next race: 2020 Food City 300
