= 2020 Food City 300 =

Race details
- Race 26 of 33 in the 2020 NASCAR Xfinity Series season
- Date: September 18, 2020
- Location: Bristol Motor Speedway in Bristol, Tennessee
- Course: Permanent racing facility
- Course length: 0.533 miles (0.86 km)
- Distance: 300 laps, 159.9 mi (257.3 km)
- Average speed: 82.957 mph

Pole position
Driver	Justin Allgaier	JR Motorsports
- Grid positions set by competition-based formula

Most laps led
Driver	Justin Allgaier	JR Motorsports
- Laps: 126

Winner
No. 98	Chase Briscoe	Stewart-Haas Racing

The 2020 Food City 300 was a NASCAR Xfinity Series race held on September 18, 2020. It was contested over 300 laps on the 0.533-mile (0.858 km) short track. It was the twenty-sixth race of the 2020 NASCAR Xfinity Series season. Stewart-Haas Racing driver Chase Briscoe collected his seventh win of the season.

== Report ==
=== Background ===
The layout of Bristol Motor Speedway, the venue where the race was held.

The Bristol Motor Speedway, formerly known as Bristol International Raceway and Bristol Raceway, is a NASCAR short track venue located in Bristol, Tennessee. Constructed in 1960, it held its first NASCAR race on July 30, 1961. Despite its short length, Bristol is among the most popular tracks on the NASCAR schedule because of its distinct features, which include extraordinarily steep banking, an all concrete surface, two pit roads, and stadium-like seating. It has also been named one of the loudest NASCAR tracks.

=== Entry list ===
- (R) denotes rookie driver.
- (i) denotes driver who is ineligible for series driver points.

No.	Driver	Team	Manufacturer
0	Jeffrey Earnhardt	JD Motorsports	Chevrolet
1	Michael Annett	JR Motorsports	Chevrolet
02	Brett Moffitt (i)	Our Motorsports	Chevrolet
4	Jesse Little (R)	JD Motorsports	Chevrolet
5	Matt Mills	B. J. McLeod Motorsports	Chevrolet
6	B. J. McLeod	JD Motorsports	Chevrolet
7	Justin Allgaier	JR Motorsports	Chevrolet
07	Gray Gaulding	SS-Green Light Racing	Chevrolet
8	Jeb Burton	JR Motorsports	Chevrolet
08	Joe Graf Jr. (R)	SS-Green Light Racing	Chevrolet
9	Noah Gragson	JR Motorsports	Chevrolet
10	Ross Chastain	Kaulig Racing	Chevrolet
11	Justin Haley	Kaulig Racing	Chevrolet
13	Timmy Hill (i)	MBM Motorsports	Toyota
15	Colby Howard	JD Motorsports	Chevrolet
18	Riley Herbst (R)	Joe Gibbs Racing	Toyota
19	Brandon Jones	Joe Gibbs Racing	Toyota
20	Harrison Burton (R)	Joe Gibbs Racing	Toyota
21	Anthony Alfredo	Richard Childress Racing	Chevrolet
22	Austin Cindric	Team Penske	Ford
36	Alex Labbé	DGM Racing	Chevrolet
39	Ryan Sieg	RSS Racing	Chevrolet
44	Tommy Joe Martins	Martins Motorsports	Chevrolet
47	Kyle Weatherman	Mike Harmon Racing	Chevrolet
51	Jeremy Clements	Jeremy Clements Racing	Chevrolet
52	Kody Vanderwal (R)	Means Racing	Chevrolet
61	Chad Finchum	Hattori Racing	Toyota
66	Stephen Leicht	MBM Motorsports	Toyota
68	Brandon Brown	Brandonbilt Motorsports	Chevrolet
74	Bayley Currey (i)	Mike Harmon Racing	Chevrolet
78	Stefan Parsons	B. J. McLeod Motorsports	Toyota
90	Dexter Bean	DGM Racing	Chevrolet
92	Josh Williams	DGM Racing	Chevrolet
93	Myatt Snider (R)	RSS Racing	Chevrolet
98	Chase Briscoe	Stewart-Haas Racing	Ford
99	Vinnie Miller	B. J. McLeod Motorsports	Chevrolet
Official entry list

== Qualifying ==
Justin Allgaier was awarded the pole based on competition based formula.

=== Qualifying results ===
Pos	No	Driver	Team	Manufacturer
1	7	Justin Allgaier	JR Motorsports	Chevrolet
2	10	Ross Chastain	Kaulig Racing	Chevrolet
3	9	Noah Gragson	JR Motorsports	Chevrolet
4	22	Austin Cindric	Team Penske	Ford
5	11	Justin Haley	Kaulig Racing	Chevrolet
6	20	Harrison Burton (R)	Joe Gibbs Racing	Toyota
7	8	Jeb Burton	JR Motorsports	Chevrolet
8	19	Brandon Jones	Joe Gibbs Racing	Toyota
9	1	Michael Annett	JR Motorsports	Chevrolet
10	98	Chase Briscoe	Stewart-Haas Racing	Ford
11	39	Ryan Sieg	RSS Racing	Chevrolet
12	68	Brandon Brown	Brandonbilt Motorsports	Chevrolet
13	36	Alex Labbé	DGM Racing	Chevrolet
14	02	Brett Moffitt	Our Motorsports	Chevrolet
15	0	Jeffrey Earnhardt	JD Motorsports	Chevrolet
16	51	Jeremy Clements	Jeremy Clements Racing	Chevrolet
17	5	Matt Mills	B. J. McLeod Motorsports	Chevrolet
18	92	Josh Williams	DGM Racing	Chevrolet
19	21	Anthony Alfredo	Richard Childress Racing	Chevrolet
20	18	Riley Herbst (R)	Joe Gibbs Racing	Toyota
21	6	B. J. McLeod	JD Motorsports	Chevrolet
22	74	Bayley Currey (i)	Mike Harmon Racing	Chevrolet
23	08	Joe Graf Jr. (R)	SS-Green Light Racing	Chevrolet
24	47	Kyle Weatherman	Mike Harmon Racing	Chevrolet
25	4	Jesse Little (R)	JD Motorsports	Chevrolet
26	44	Tommy Joe Martins	Martins Motorsports	Chevrolet
27	61	Chad Finchum	MBM Motorsports	Toyota
28	07	Gray Gaulding	SS-Green Light Racing	Chevrolet
29	93	Myatt Snider	RSS Racing	Chevrolet
30	90	Dexter Bean	DGM Racing	Chevrolet
31	15	Colby Howard	JD Motorsports	Chevrolet
32	78	Stefan Parsons	B. J. McLeod Motorsports	Chevrolet
33	52	Kody Vanderwal (R)	Means Motorsports	Chevrolet
34	13	Timmy Hill (i)	MBM Motorsports	Toyota
35	99	Vinnie Miller	B. J. McLeod Motorsports	Toyota
36	66	Stephen Leicht	MBM Motorsports	Toyota
Official qualifying results

== Race ==
=== Race results ===
==== Stage Results ====
Stage One Laps: 85

Pos	No	Driver	Team	Manufacturer	Points
1	7	Justin Allgaier	JR Motorsports	Chevrolet	10
2	11	Justin Haley	Kaulig Racing	Chevrolet	9
3	98	Chase Briscoe	Stewart-Haas Racing	Ford	8
4	22	Austin Cindric	Team Penske	Ford	7
5	10	Ross Chastain	Kaulig Racing	Chevrolet	6
6	9	Noah Gragson	JR Motorsports	Chevrolet	5
7	19	Brandon Jones	Joe Gibbs Racing	Toyota	4
8	1	Michael Annett	JR Motorsports	Chevrolet	3
9	8	Jeb Burton	JR Motorsports	Chevrolet	2
10	20	Harrison Burton	Joe Gibbs Racing	Toyota	1

Stage Two Laps: 85

Pos	No	Driver	Team	Manufacturer	Points
1	7	Justin Allgaier	JR Motorsports	Chevrolet	10
2	22	Austin Cindric	Team Penske	Ford	9
3	98	Chase Briscoe	Stewart-Haas Racing	Ford	8
4	10	Ross Chastain	Kaulig Racing	Chevrolet	7
5	9	Noah Gragson	JR Motorsports	Chevrolet	6
6	8	Jeb Burton	JR Motorsports	Chevrolet	5
7	20	Harrison Burton	Joe Gibbs Racing	Toyota	4
8	18	Riley Herbst (R)	Stewart-Haas Racing	Toyota	3
9	21	Anthony Alfredo	Richard Childress Racing	Chevrolet	2
10	39	Ryan Sieg	RSS Racing	Chevrolet	1

=== Final Stage Results ===
Laps: 130

Pos	Grid	No	Driver	Team	Manufacturer	Laps	Points	Status
1	10	98	Chase Briscoe	Stewart-Haas Racing	Ford	300	56	Running
2	2	10	Ross Chastain	Kaulig Racing	Chevrolet	300	48	Running
3	4	22	Austin Cindric	Team Penske	Ford	300	50	Running
4	6	20	Harrison Burton (R)	Joe Gibbs Racing	Toyota	300	38	Running
5	1	7	Justin Allgaier	JR Motorsports	Chevrolet	300	52	Running
6	19	21	Anthony Alfredo	Richard Childress Racing	Chevrolet	300	33	Running
7	3	9	Noah Gragson	JR Motorsports	Chevrolet	300	41	Running
8	8	19	Brandon Jones	Joe Gibbs Racing	Toyota	300	33	Running
9	7	8	Jeb Burton	JR Motorsports	Chevrolet	300	35	Running
10	20	18	Riley Herbst (R)	Joe Gibbs Racing	Toyota	300	30	Running
11	16	51	Jeremy Clements	Jeremy Clements Racing	Chevrolet	300	26	Running
12	12	68	Brandon Brown	Brandonbilt Motorsports	Chevrolet	300	25	Running
13	13	36	Alex Labbé	DGM Racing	Chevrolet	300	24	Running
14	11	39	Ryan Sieg	RSS Racing	Chevrolet	299	24	Running
15	34	13	Timmy Hill (i)	MBM Motorsports	Toyota	299	0	Running
16	5	11	Justin Haley	Kaulig Racing	Chevrolet	299	30	Running
17	15	0	Jeffrey Earnhardt	JD Motorsports	Chevrolet	298	20	Running
18	28	07	Gray Gaulding (i)	SS-Green Light Racing	Chevrolet	298	0	Running
19	18	92	Josh Williams	DGM Racing	Chevrolet	298	18	Running
20	27	61	Chad Finchum	Hattori Racing Enterprises	Toyota	297	17	Running
21	31	15	Colby Howard	JD Motorsports	Chevrolet	295	16	Running
22	17	5	Matt Mills	B. J. McLeod Motorsports	Chevrolet	294	15	Running
23	32	78	Stefan Parsons	B. J. McLeod Motorsports	Chevrolet	294	14	Running
24	26	44	Tommy Joe Martins	Martins Motorsports	Chevrolet	293	13	Running
25	25	4	Jesse Little (R)	JD Motorsports	Chevrolet	292	12	Running
26	14	02	Brett Moffitt (i)	Our Motorsports	Chevrolet	292	0	Running
27	23	08	Joe Graf Jr. (R)	SS-Green Light Racing	Chevrolet	292	10	Running
28	30	90	Dexter Bean	DGM Racing	Chevrolet	290	9	Running
29	33	52	Kody Vanderwal (R)	Means Motorsports	Chevrolet	287	8	Running
30	22	74	Bayley Currey (i)	Mike Harmon Racing	Chevrolet	201	0	Accident
31	9	1	Michael Annett	JR Motorsports	Chevrolet	121	9	Accident
32	24	47	Kyle Weatherman	Mike Harmon Racing	Chevrolet	62	5	Suspension
33	35	99	Vinnie Miller	B. J. McLeod Motorsports	Chevrolet	61	4	Accident
34	21	6	B. J. McLeod	JD Motorsports	Chevrolet	61	3	Accident
35	29	93	Myatt Snider	RSS Racing	Chevrolet	31	2	Engine
36	36	66	Stephen Leicht	MBM Motorsports	Toyota	11	1	Clutch
Official race results

=== Race statistics ===
- Lead changes: 10 among 5 different drivers
- Cautions/Laps: 7 for 45
- Time of race: 1 hour, 55 minutes, and 39 seconds
- Average speed: 82.957 mph (133.506 km/h)

Previous race: 2020 Virginia Is For Racing Lovers 250	NASCAR Xfinity Series; 2020 season	Next race: 2020 Alsco 300
